= 1909 Michigan Wolverines football team =

American college football season

1909 Michigan Wolverines football
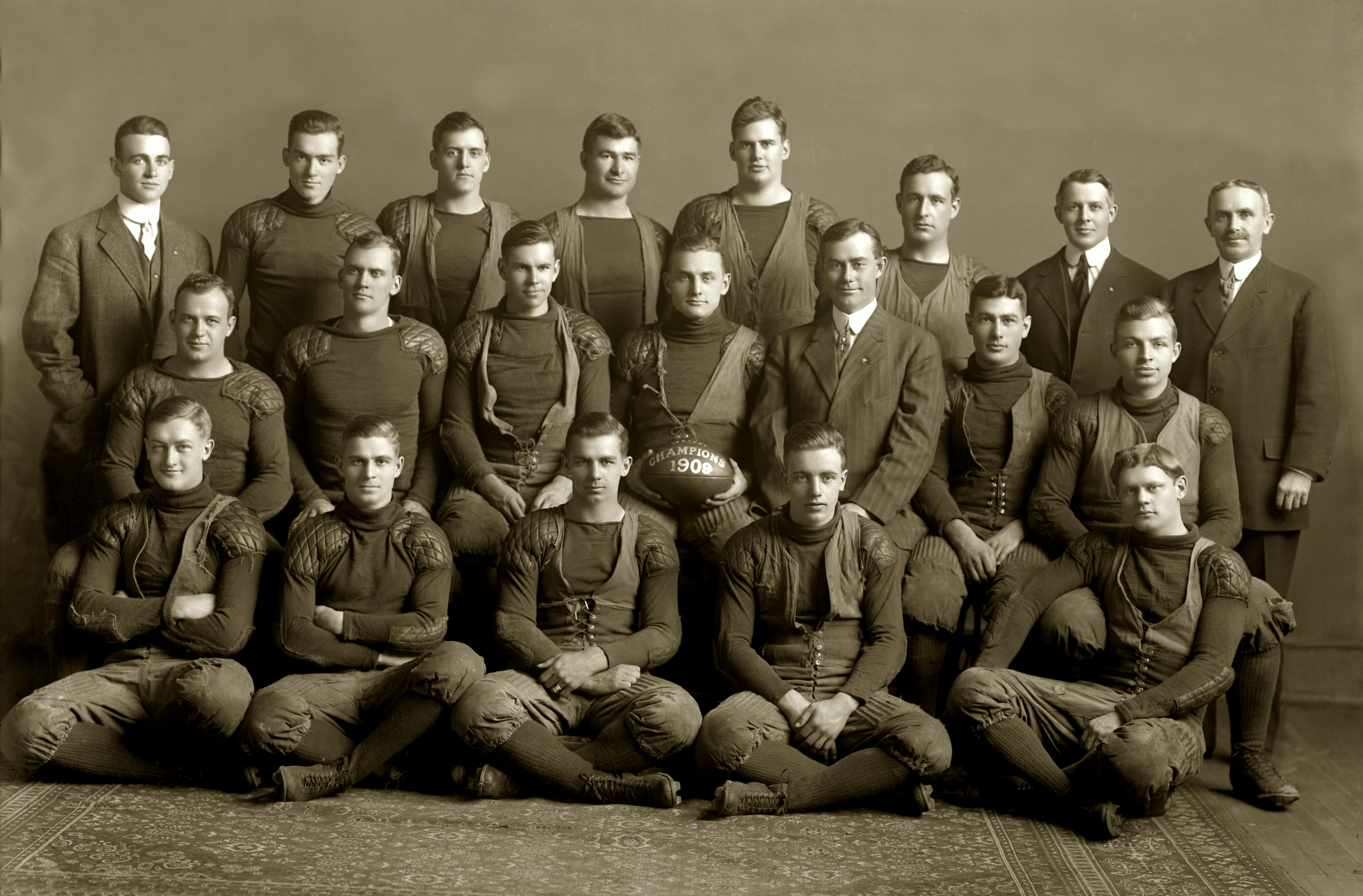
- Conference: Independent
- Record: 6–1
- Head coach: Fielding H. Yost (9th season)
- Captain: Dave Allerdice
- Home stadium: Ferry Field

1909 Midwestern college football independents records
	Conf.			Overall
Team	W	L	T	W		L		T
Iowa State Normal		–		6	–	0	–	0
Notre Dame		–		7	–	0	–	1
Michigan Agricultural		–		8	–	1	–	0
Carthage		–		6	–	1	–	0
Michigan		–		6	–	1	–	0
Western State Normal		–		6	–	1	–	0
Mount Union		–		8	–	2	–	0
Lake Forest		–		5	–	1	–	1
Haskell		–		7	–	2	–	0
Detroit College		–		3	–	1	–	2
Butler		–		5	–	3	–	0
Central Michigan		–		4	–	3	–	0
St. Mary's (OH)		–		4	–	3	–	0
Cincinnati		–		4	–	3	–	1
Doane		–		3	–	2	–	3
Buchtel		–		4	–	4	–	0
Rose Poly		–		4	–	4	–	0
Marquette		–		2	–	2	–	1
North Dakota Agricultural		–		2	–	2	–	1
Wabash		–		3	–	4	–	1
Miami (OH)		–		3	–	4	–	0
Ohio		–		2	–	4	–	2
Saint Louis		–		3	–	5	–	0
Michigan State Normal		–		2	–	4	–	0
Western Illinois		–		1	–	2	–	0
Fairmount		–		2	–	5	–	1
Northern Illinois State		–		2	–	6	–	0
South Dakota State		–		1	–	3	–	0
Heidelberg		–		0	–	7	–	2

The 1909 Michigan Wolverines football team represented the University of Michigan as an independent during the 1909 college football season. The team's head coach was Fielding H. Yost in his ninth year at Michigan. The Wolverines compiled a record of 6–1, outscored opponents 116 to 34, and held six of seven opponents to six points or less.

The team began its season with four consecutive victories, including close calls against Case (3–0) and Marquette (6–5) and dominating performances against Ohio State (33–6) and Syracuse (44–0). The team's sole setback came in the fifth game, losing to Notre Dame (11–3) for the first time in nine games between them. Following the game, a Detroit newspaper described Notre Dame's predominantly Irish-American lineup as a group of "Fighting Irishmen", giving birth to the team's nickname.

The Wolverines then finished the season with impressive road victories over two of the best teams in the country. In Philadelphia, they defeated the 1908 national champion Penn Quakers, 12–6, breaking the Quakers' 23-game winning streak. In Minneapolis, they defeated the previously unbeaten 1909 Western Conference champions from Minnesota, 15–6. The 1909 Minnesota game was the first game played for possession of the Little Brown Jug, the oldest rivalry trophy in college football.

Several players from the 1909 Michigan team received recognition for their performance. Left guard Albert Benbrook was the first Western lineman (and the fifth Western player at any position) to be selected as a first-team All-American by Walter Camp. Both of Michigan's halfbacks, Dave Allerdice and Joe Magidsohn, were chosen by Camp as second-team All-Americans and also received first-team honors on Walter Eckersall's All-Western team in the Chicago Daily Tribune. Allerdice, who was the 1909 team captain, also received first-team All-American honors from The New York Times and syndicated sports columnist Tommy Clark. Magidsohn was the first Jewish athlete to win a varsity "M" at the University of Michigan. Andrew Smith was also named the first-team All-Western center, despite having only moved to the position for the last two games of the season.

== Schedule ==
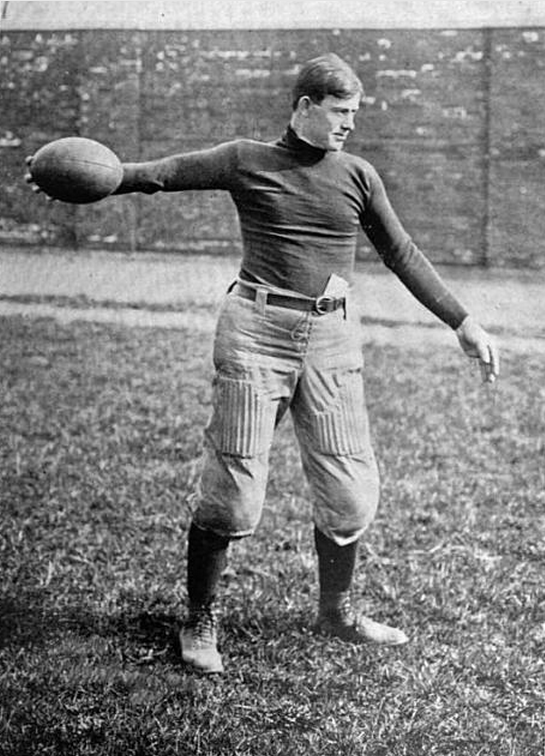
Head coach Fielding H. Yost

Date	Time	Opponent	Site	Result	Attendance	Source
October 9		Case	Ferry Field; Ann Arbor, MI	W 3–0		
October 16		Ohio State	Ferry Field; Ann Arbor, MI (rivalry)	W 33–6		
October 23		at Marquette	Milwaukee, WI	W 6–5		
October 30	2:30 p.m.	Syracuse^{†}	Ferry Field; Ann Arbor, MI	W 44–0	7,500	
November 6	2:15 p.m.	Notre Dame	Ferry Field; Ann Arbor, MI (rivalry)	L 3–11		
November 13	2:07 p.m.	at Penn	Franklin Field; Philadelphia, PA	W 12–6	17,000	
November 20	2:01 p.m.	at Minnesota	Northrop Field; Minneapolis, MN (Little Brown Jug)	W 15–6	22,000	
^{†}Homecoming; All times are in Eastern time

== Season summary ==
=== Preseason ===
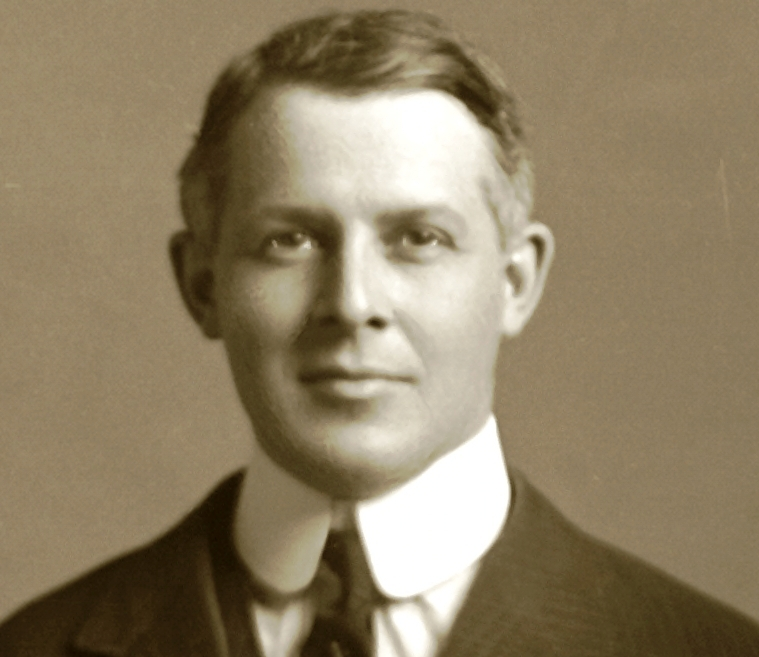
Athletic director Philip Bartelme

In July 1909, Michigan hired Philip Bartelme as the school's second athletic director following the resignation of Charles A. Baird. The change in athletic directors led to speculation that Michigan might be prepared to return to the Western Conference. In September 1909, Barthelme stated his intention to return Michigan to the conference, though he did not think the time was yet right. He told the press, "I always have thought that Michigan's place is in the conference, and moreover, I have thought that when conditions were so we could return, it would be the only thing for us to do. However, I am not so sure that that time has come." He noted that the "training table" was the biggest obstacle to Michigan's rejoining the conference and contended that the training table was "a great factor in getting the men into the condition necessary for hard football" and avoiding serious injuries.

Michigan's fall training camp began on September 20, 1909, at Whitmore Lake. Twelve men reported on the first day of camp, including five veterans who had won varsity letters on the 1908 team: team captain Dave Allerdice, quarterback William Wasmund, guard Albert Benbrook, James K. Watkins, and Roy Ranney. The most significant loss from the 1908 team was All-American center Germany Schulz. By the time training camp ended two weeks later, the team had grown to 22 players, and The Michigan Alumnus reported that it promised to be one of Michigan's best teams in years, with "one of the speediest and most aggressive backfields in the west, if not in the country."

The 1909 season was played under changed rules. The rule changes for 1909 included reducing the value of a field goal (whether by drop kick or place kick) from four points to three points. Michigan's Board in Control of Athletics also re-established a freshman football team in 1909 after the freshman football program had been ceased four years earlier. Michigan head coach Fielding H. Yost said at the time, "It is to the freshmen that we must look for our future Michigan teams and I am glad that it has been decided to allow us to have such a team. Under competent coaching such as they will have the men will learn a lot about the Michigan style of playing and this will be invaluable when they come up for the Varsity team in future years." Prentiss Douglass was hired as the coach of the freshman team, and he led the freshman to a 5–0 record.

=== Case ===
Case at Michigan

Team	1	2	Total
Case	0	0	0
• Michigan	0	3	3

- Date: October 9, 1909
- Location: Ferry Field • Ann Arbor, Michigan
- Referee: Eldridge (Michigan)

Michigan opened its 1909 season at Ferry Field with a 3–0 victory over the team from Cleveland's Case Scientific School. The game was the 13th meeting between the two programs, and Michigan had won all 12 of the prior games by a combined score of 351 to 37.

Michigan played "old-fashioned football" against Case, with the exception of two unsuccessful on-side kicks. Case blocked two of Dave Allerdice's punts, a problem that The Michigan Alumnus attributed to the inability of new men in Michigan's line to protect Allerdice from Case's rushers. The game was tied 0–0 late in the game. Michigan's only points came with a few minutes remaining on a field goal by Allerdice from the 35-yard line. In the Chicago Daily Tribune, Walter Eckersall wrote: "The old reliable, Allerdice, was called into commission, and he delivered the necessary boot to register enough points to win for his team." Despite the disappointing performance of the offense, the defense played a strong game, allowing only three first downs, one on a long forward pass, one on an end run, and one on an on-side kick.

Michigan's narrow margin of victory over Case raised concerns about the team's prospects. The Michigan Alumnus attributed the low score to two factors "the disheartening frequency of the Michigan fumbles" and "the unexpected strength of the Case veterans" (the Case team had nine veterans among its starting eleven). The New York Times blamed Michigan's close call on injuries: "Injuries and lack of training resulted in Michigan having a crippled line-up against the veteran Case eleven." The Detroit Free Press noted that the lack of healthy substitutes forced Michigan to play a conservative game so as to avoid further injuries.

Michigan's lineup against Case was Rogers (left end), Edmunds (left tackle), Benbrook (left guard), Watkins (center), Smith (right guard), Wells (right tackle), Borleske (right end), Wasmund (quarterback), Bertrand and Magidsohn (left halfback), Allerdice (right halfback), and Lawton (fullback). The game was played in 20-minute halves. The referee was Eldridge of Michigan.

=== Ohio State ===
Ohio State at Michigan

Team	1	2	Total
Ohio State	0	6	6
• Michigan	21	12	33

- Date: October 16, 1909
- Location: Ferry Field • Ann Arbor, Michigan
- Referee: Hoagland (Princeton)

In the second week of the 1909 season, Michigan defeated Ohio State, 33 to 6. The game was the 11th meeting in the Michigan–Ohio State football rivalry, with Michigan having won nine of the prior meetings and tied once.

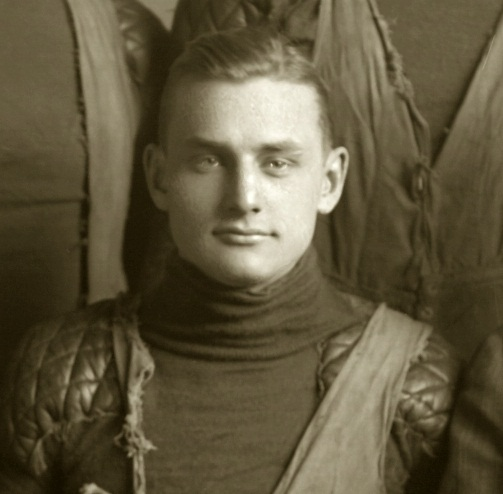
Team captain Dave Allerdice scored 18 points against Ohio State.

Right halfback Dave Allerdice was the scoring leader for Michigan, tallying 18 points on three field goals, four extra points, and a touchdown. He also made good use of the on-side kick for long gains and had two 40-yard runs that set up Michigan touchdowns. Michigan outscored Ohio State, 21 to 0, in the first half. Michigan's touchdowns were scored by fullback George M. Lawton (2), Allerdice, and right tackle Stanfield Wells. Ohio State's only points came on a touchdown late in the second half. Michigan halfback "Doc" Freeney allowed a long punt to roll past him, tried to pick up the ball at the two-yard line, and fumbled. Ohio State's sub-center, Boone, recovered the ball in the endzone.

The Michigan Alumnus praised Allerdice for "a great exhibition of his abilities" on both defense and offense. The same publication also noted that right tackle Stanfield Wells had shown himself as "an all-around player", breaking through the Ohio line to tackle runners for a loss and opening large holes on offense for the Michigan backs. The Detroit Free Press wrote that Allerdice was "in a class by himself." Starting left tackle William Edmunds sustained a dislocated left collarbone against Ohio State and missed the next three games.

Michigan's lineup against Ohio State (starters listed first) was Rogers and Pattengill (left end), Edmunds (left tackle), Benbrook (left guard), Watkins (center), Smith and Conklin (right guard), Wells and Hines (right tackle), Borleske (right end), Wasmund (quarterback), Freeney and Magidsohn (left halfback), Allerdice (right halfback), and Lawton and Clark (fullback). The game was played in 35-minute halves. The referee was Hoagland of Princeton.

=== At Marquette ===
Michigan at Marquette

Team	1	2	Total
• Michigan	6	0	6
Marquette	5	0	5

- Date: October 23, 1909
- Location: Milwaukee
- Referee: Kelly (Princeton)

For the third game of the season, Michigan traveled to Milwaukee, Wisconsin to play a Marquette team coached by the former Wisconsin star, William Juneau. The game was the first between the two schools. Michigan was handicapped in the game by injuries to multiple players. Edmunds, Smith, Pattengill and Freeney all missed the game, and fullback George M. Lawton played despite a midweek injury that left him "more fit for the hospital" than for the job of playing fullback. The Detroit Free Press wrote that "the hoodoo that has tirelessly pursued Yost and Michigan ever since the 1905 Chicago game" had returned. The losses were offset to some extent by the decision of William Casey to rejoin the team in time for the Marquette game. Casey had quit the team after the 1908 season, but was persuaded by pleading from Yost, Allerdice and friends to return to the team. He was the team's starting left tackle in the final five games of the season.

The field was wet and slippery, such that "fast work was impossible." Michigan won the game, 6–5, scoring its only points early in the first half. After driving to Marquette's 30-yard line, Dave Allerdice lined up to kick a field goal, but the field goal attempt was a fake, and Allerdice executed an on-side kick that Michigan recovered at Marquette's five-yard line. After a penalty moved the ball to the one-yard line, Lawton scored the touchdown, and Allerdice kicked the extra point. Ring Lardner, covering the game for the Chicago Daily Tribune, wrote: "As has been the case frequently during the last three seasons, it was Allerdice's good right toe that gave the Wolverines the victory."

Several minutes after Michigan's touchdown, Allerdice lined up to punt from Michigan's 15-yard line. The snap from center went over his head, and Marquette recovered the ball at the two-yard line. Marquette scored on its third attempt, but Marquette's right halfback Munsell missed the extra point, and Michigan led 6–5. In the second half, Michigan played a defensive game, punting the ball at "almost every opportunity." Ring Lardner reported that Michigan's coach "evidently had instructed Allerdice to play a kicking game", and the team "appeared loathe to try its offense." Late in the second half, Michigan narrowly preserved its lead after a field goal attempt by Allerdice was blocked at the Marquette 45-yard line. Marquette's fullback, Schroeder, picked up the ball and ran toward Michigan's goal "with a clear field before him." Lawton ran after Schroder and made a leaping tackle that saved the game for Michigan.

The Michigan Alumnus wrote that Yost had played a conservative game to save his new plays for the big games ahead and to avoid further injuries to his players. Lardner wrote: "That Michigan did not play its game nor show its strength was apparent. Yost brought his team here for the purpose of winning by any kind of score. Straight football was order throughout the Michigan side. Not one solitary forward pass was attempted by the Wolverines, and onside kicks and other modern stunts were as scarce as a Frenchman in a brewery." In contrast, Marquette's coach Juneau "showed his whole hand and it was full of delayed and forward passes of kinds apparently new to Yost's youngsters."

Michigan's lineup against Marquette was Rogers and Ranney (left end), Casey (left tackle), Benbrook (left guard), Watkins (center), Conklin (right guard), Wells (right tackle), Miller (right end), Wasmund (quarterback), Magidsohn (left halfback), Allerdice (right halfback), and Lawton and Clark (fullback). The game was played in halves of 25 and 30 minutes. The referee was Kelly of Princeton.

=== Syracuse ===
Syracuse at Michigan

Team	1	2	Total
Syracuse	0	0	0
• Michigan	17	27	44

- Date: October 30, 1909
- Location: Ferry Field • Ann Arbor, Michigan
- Referee: Fultz (Brown)

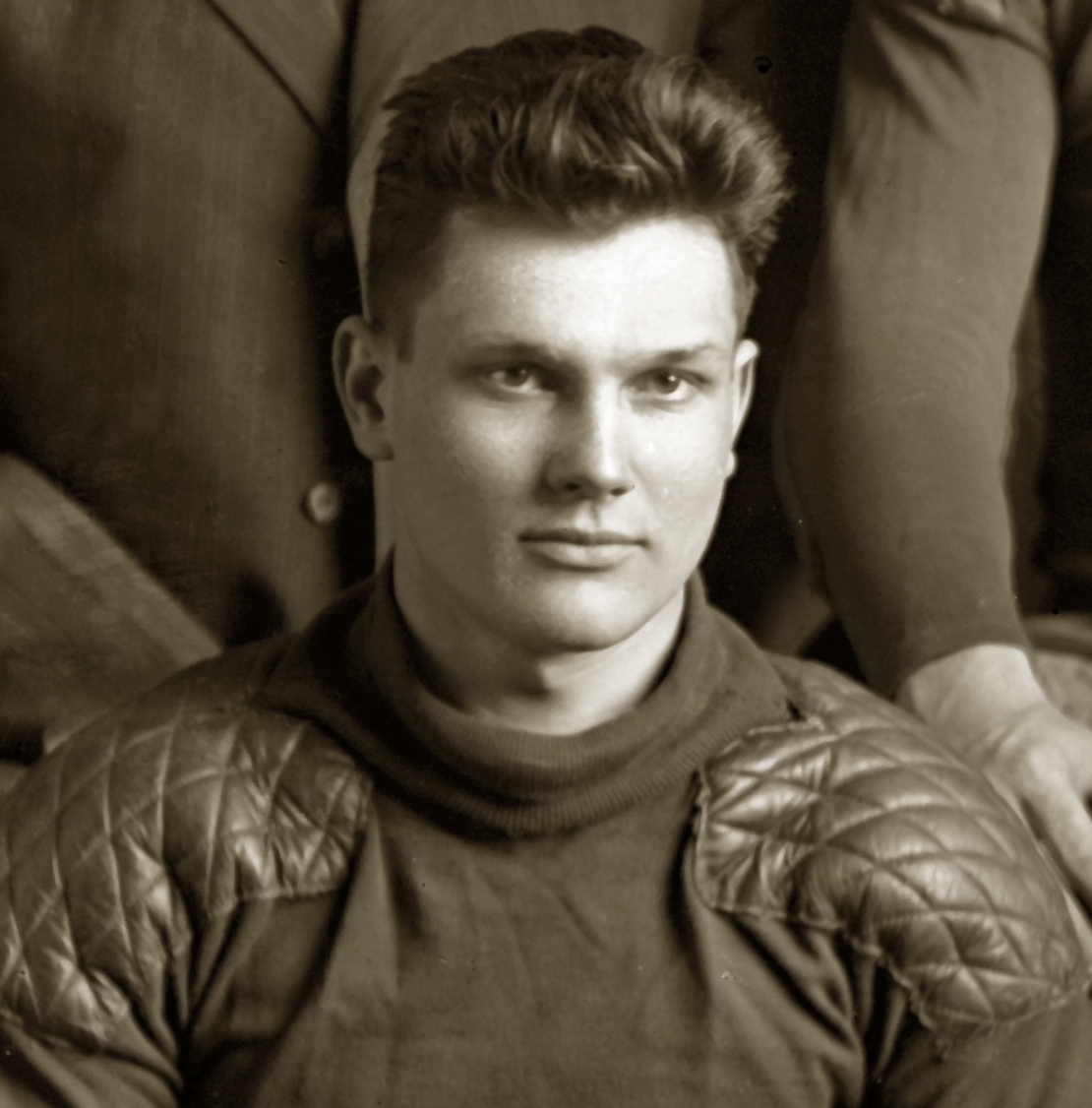
Stanley Borleske scored two touchdowns against Syracuse and broke his collar bone the next week against Notre Dame.

In the fourth week of the 1909 season, Michigan shut out Syracuse, 44 to 0, (Note: There is a discrepancy in contemporaneous reports as to whether Michigan scored 43 or 44 points against Syracuse, the difference being whether Dave Allerdice converted five or six of his extra point attempts. The Chicago Daily Tribune reported on the day after the game that Allerdice had missed two extra point attempts. While accounts differ, the University of Michigan records the final score as 44–0. According to the Bentley Historical Library, the initial report from The Michigan Daily gave the result as 43–0, but the Daily corrected the score several days later to 44–0. Further, the Michigan athletic department's own "Dope Books", the official listing of results and letterwinners, records the score as 44–0.) before a crowd estimated at 7,500 persons at Ferry Field. The game was the second played between the schools, with Syracuse having won the first game in 1908 by a score of 28 to 4.

In the Syracuse game, Dave Allerdice scored 19 points on two touchdowns, six extra points, and a field goal. Allerdice scored the Wolverines' first points on a touchdown run from the four-yard line; Allerdice also kicked the extra point to give Michigan a 6–0 lead. Michigan's second touchdown was scored by James Joy Miller on a run around right end; Allerdice again converted the extra point, and Michigan led, 12–0. Allerdice scored the third touchdown but missed the extra point, and Michigan led, 17–0, at halftime.

Early in the second half, Allerdice's field goal extended the lead to 20–0. Quarterback William Wasmund added to the lead with a 70-yard punt return for a touchdown. Allerdice kicked the extra point, and Michigan led 26–0. Two minutes later, Albert Benbrook recovered a blocked punt and passed the ball to Stanley Borleske who ran 45 yards for a touchdown. Allerdice kicked the extra point, and Michigan led, 32–0. Michigan's next touchdown came on a forward pass from Wasmund to Borleske who ran 40 yards with the ball. Allerdice kicked the extra point, and Michigan led, 38–0. Michigan's final touchdown came when Syracuse fumbled the snap on a punt attempt; Stanfield Wells recovered the ball and returned the ball to the end zone. Michigan won by a final score of 44–0. Three of Michigan's seven touchdowns were the direct result of fumbles by Syracuse.

In the Detroit Free Press, E. A. Batchelor wrote: "Playing real Michigan football for the first time in lo, these many years, the Yost machine today literally ground the Syracuse eleven to bits and distributed the fragments over the surface of Ferry field." The Michigan Alumnus called it "the most spectacular game that has been played on Ferry Field in years", noting that the team "used every style of play that could be imagined and executed forward passes, end runs and line bucks with precision and speed." The Alumnus praised the work of Albert Benbrook and Stanfield Wells in penetrating the line and tackling Syracuse backs for losses. The Alumnus also praised the effort of quarterback William Wasmund:

"For the first time in his three years of playing on the Michigan team Wasmund ran the team in a manner worthy a Michigan quarterback. Never before has he used better judgment in calling for plays or has he run back punts in such a manner . . . The most spectacular play of the day was made by him when, receiving a punt on the Michigan 35-yard line, he ran all the way for a touchdown, dodging Syracuse tacklers who attempted to stop him."

The New York Times opined that Stanley Borleske was "the stellar feature of the day" and praised the improvement in the Michigan team: "The Michigan form, so demoralized a week ago, was splendid. The blocking and tackling, which have been Michigan's weak points this year, were the strong points of her play to-day." The Chicago Daily Tribune praised the work of Albert Benbrook on defense: "The Morgan Park giant tore big holes in the Syracuse line and went down under punts with remarkable speed."

Michigan's lineup against Syracuse (starters listed first) was Ranney and Borleske (left end), Casey (left tackle), Benbrook (left guard), Watkins and Kaynor (center), Smith and Conklin (right guard), Wells (right tackle), Miller (right end), Wasmund (quarterback), Magidsohn, Freeney and Greene (left halfback), Allerdice (right halfback), and Lawton and Clark (fullback). The game was played in 35-minute halves. The referee was Fultz from Brown.

=== Notre Dame ===
Notre Dame at Michigan

Team	1	2	Total
• Notre Dame	5	6	11
Michigan	3	0	3

- Date: November 6, 1909
- Location: Ferry Field • Ann Arbor, Michigan
- Referee: Hoagland (Princeton)

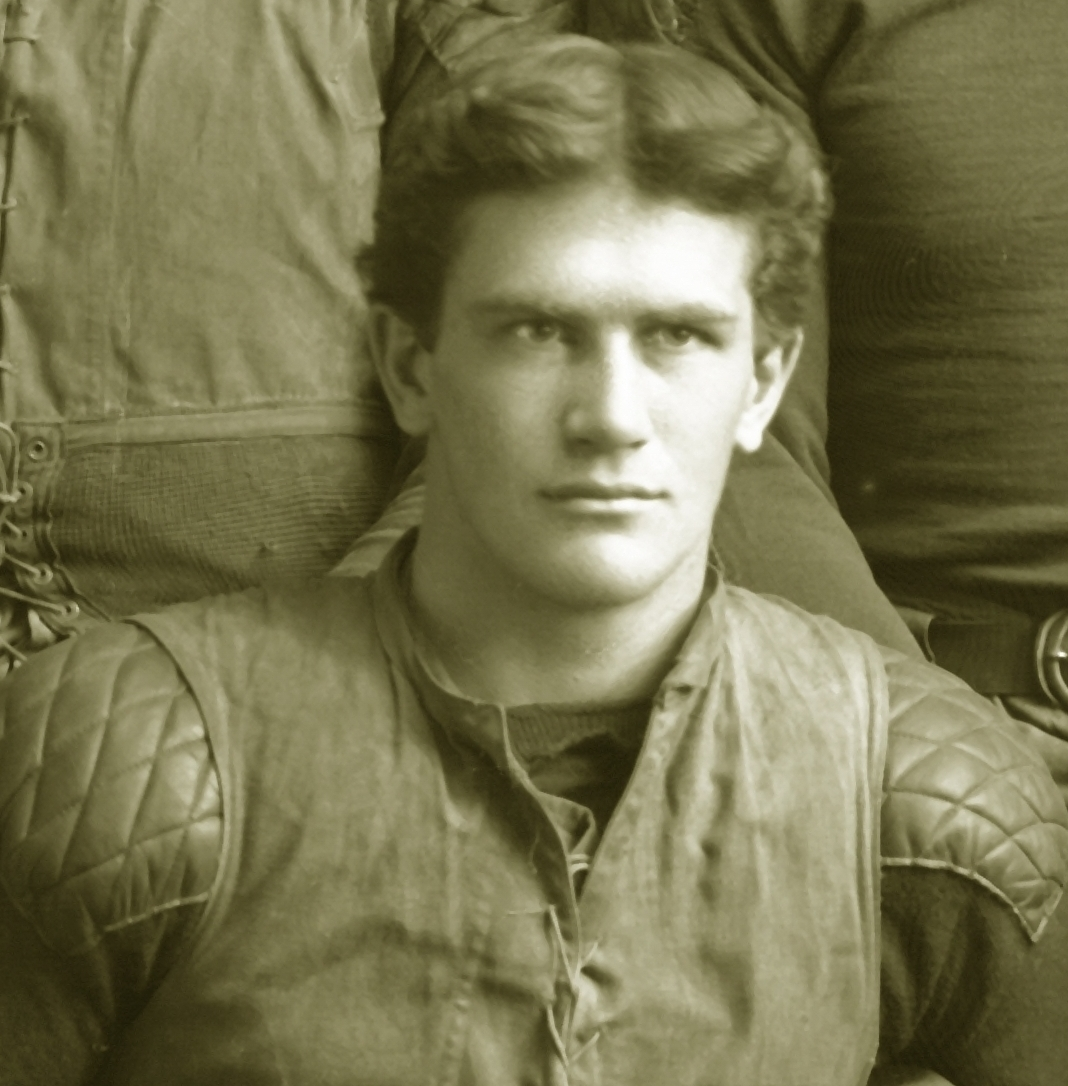
Former Michigan star Frank Longman led his band of "Fighting Irishmen" to victory over his former mentor's team.

On November 6, 1909, Michigan suffered its only defeat of the season, losing 11–3 to a Notre Dame team coached by former Michigan star, Frank Longman. Longman had played on Fielding H. Yost's "Point-a-Minute" teams from 1903 to 1905 and took over as Notre Dame's head coach in 1909. The game was the ninth meeting in the Michigan–Notre Dame football rivalry. Michigan had won the first eight games (five of them by shutouts) by a combined score of 121 to 16.

The game was played at Ferry Field, and promotional "bargain day" prices attracted a large crowd. Walter Camp, the "Father of American Football", attended the game, which was accompanied by "the usual cheers, the usual parade of the student band, the usual singing of 'The Yellow and the Blue' and all the other things that go to make up a game at Ferry field." When the Michigan team ran onto the field at 2:05 p.m., Michigan's quarterback William Wasmund had his head "swathed in bandages."

Notre Dame drove to Michigan's 20-yard line early in the game, but their attempt at field goal was blocked by Albert Benbrook. Shortly thereafter, Dave Allerdice kicked a field goal from the 27-yard line to give Michigan a 3–0 lead. Notre Dame scored on a one-yard run by Vaughan, missed the extra point, and led 5–3 at halftime. Starting left end Stanley Borleske suffered a broken collar bone early in the game and was replaced by James Rogers. Notre Dame's left halfback, Red Miller, was able to make substantial gains around the end after Borleske left the game. Notre Dame's offense was also aided by a "careful precision" passing game. In the Detroit Free Press, E. A. Batchelor praised the work of Miller, opining that no greater exhibition of all-around work had been seen at Ann Arbor "since Willie Heston was in his prime. It was wonderful."

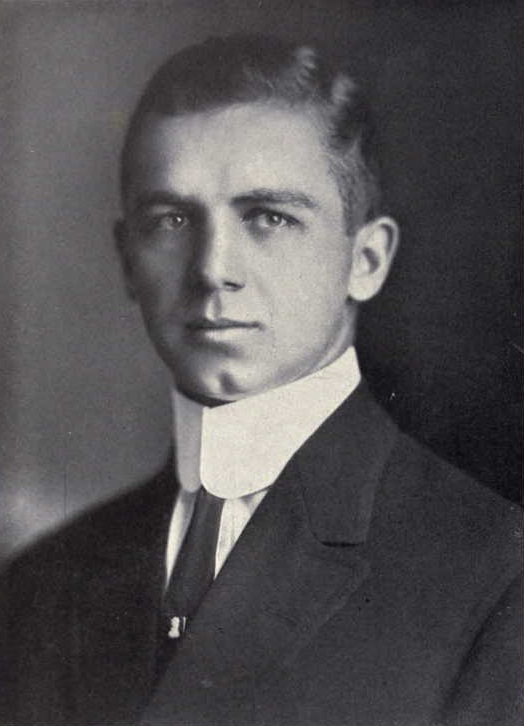
Quarterback Billy Wasmund had his head "swathed in bandages" against Notre Dame.

Michigan lost an excellent scoring opportunity in the second half. The Wolverines recovered a fumble at Notre Dame's 15-yard line and drove the ball to the six-yard line. With one yard to go for a first down, and "to the utter astonishment of nearly everyone present who knew enough about football", Wasmund called on Allerdice to kick a field goal rather than trying for the one remaining yard needed for a first down. The snap from center was poor, and by the time Allerdice kicked the ball, it hit a Notre Dame lineman in the chest and rolled to the 40-yard line where Notre Dame recovered. Wasmund's decision to call for the field goal was widely criticized as a "blunder", "silly", and "an atrocious error of judgment" that cost Michigan the game. On the sidelines, Walter Camp and Fielding Yost "expressed their disapproval in the most decisive terms."

With five minutes remaining in the game, Notre Dame scored a second touchdown after Wasmund allowed an on-side kick to get past him. Notre Dame recovered at Michigan's 14-yard line, and Notre Dame halfback Billy Ryan scored on the next play – a long run around Michigan's right end. Notre Dame kicked the extra point and led 11–3.

The New York Times wrote: "The Notre Dame half backs [Miller and Ryan] showed some of the most brilliant running that was ever seen on Ferry Field." The Chicago Daily Tribune added: "The Michigan team, so brilliant last week, showed not a semblance of the football that was to win again the championship of the west, while Notre Dame was all but impervious to its best attempts, offensive and defensive." In the Detroit Free Press, E. A. Batchelor wrote: "Michigan was outplayed. More than that she was out-lucked, out-fought and out-generaled."

After the loss to Notre Dame in 1909, Michigan did not play another game against Notre Dame for 33 years. The 1909 Michigan–Notre Dame game is most remembered for its role in giving birth to the nickname of the Notre Dame football team. Notre Dame's 1909 football team was made up predominantly of players of Irish descent. E. A. Batchelor, a sportswriter for the Detroit Free Press, submitted a report with the headline: "'Shorty' Longman's Fighting Irishmen Humble the Wolverines to Tune of 11 to 3." Batchelor then opened his report as follows:

"Eleven fighting Irishmen wrecked the Yost machine this afternoon. These sons of Erin, individually and collectively representing the University of Notre Dame, not only beat the Michigan team, but they dashed some of Michigan's fondest hopes and shattered Michigan's fairest dreams."

Notre Dame football historian, John Kryk, later wrote: "With that flowery lead, E.A. Batchelor of the Detroit Free Press popularized a moniker Notre Dame teams would later come to embrace – and aptly summed up the greatest athletic achievement to that point in Notre Dame history." Kryk noted that, according to Notre Dame folklore, Batchelor had overheard a Notre Dame player trying to motivate his teammates at halftime by pleading, "What's the matter with you guys? You're all Irish and you're not fighting worth a lick."

Michigan's lineup against Notre Dame (starters listed first) was Borleseke and Rogers (left end), Casey (left tackle), Benbrook (left guard), Watkins (center), Conklin (right guard), Wells (right tackle), Miller (right end), Wasmund (quarterback), Magidsohn (left halfback), Allerdice (right halfback), and Clark and Lawton (fullback). The game was played in 35-minute halves. The referee was Hoagland from Princeton.

=== At Penn ===
Michigan at Penn

Team	1	2	Total
• Michigan	12	0	12
Penn	6	0	6

- Date: November 13, 1909
- Location: Franklin Field • Philadelphia
- Referee: Langford (Trinity)

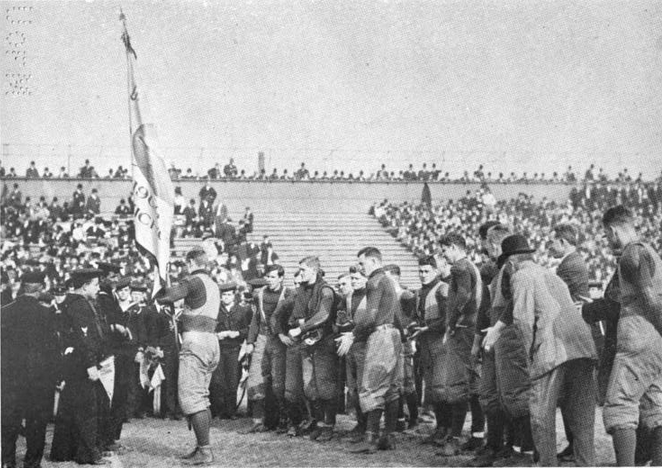
Presentation of banner by crew of the USS Michigan

On November 13, 1909, Michigan played the Penn Quakers in front of 15,000 spectators at Franklin Field in Philadelphia. Since leaving the Big Ten Conference, Michigan had played annual rivalry games against Penn at or near the end of the season. Penn was one of the dominant football programs of the era, winning seven national championships between 1894 and 1912. The 1909 game was the fifth meeting between the schools, and Penn had won the first four games by a combined score of 63 to 10.

Penn, which had won the 1908 national championship and had an ongoing 23-game winning streak, was favored again in 1909. Before the game, Coach Yost refused to predict the outcome but said that "he had confidence in his team to give Pennsylvania the hardest fight since the series started." The Wolverines came away with an upset and won the game by a score of 12 to 6. The game marked the first time a Western team had defeated one of the "Big Four" (Harvard, Yale, Princeton and Penn) which had dominated the sport of college football since the game originated almost 40 years earlier.

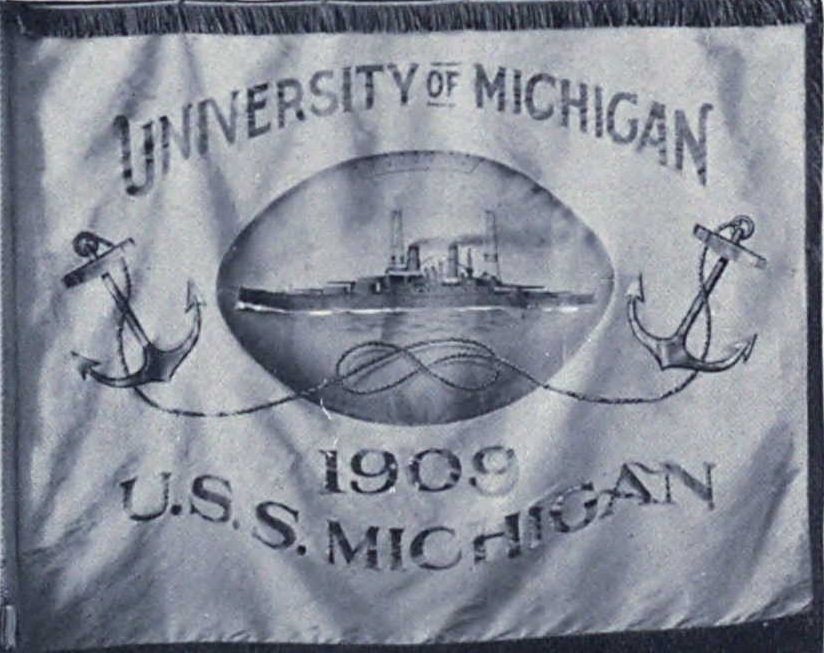
Closeup of banner presented by crew of the USS Michigan

The battleship USS Michigan, which had been delivered two months earlier and represented the state of the art in naval engineering, was anchored at the Philadelphia Naval Shipyard on League Island on the day of the game. Out of loyalty to the team that shared a name with their ship, 250 crewmen from the ship were granted leave to attend the game. Accompanied by the ship's band, the sailors marched onto the field before the game started, "each man carrying a maize and blue pennant, heads up and chest out." The unit's color bearer presented team captain Dave Allerdice with a silken flag (pictured at right) that was hung in Michigan's trophy room. One of the favorite yells repeated by the sailors was:

"Two stack, twin screw, battleship queen,
Michigan, Michigan football team."

In a surprise move, Yost moved Andrew Smith from his usual position at right guard to the center position against Penn. Smith had not played at the position until two days before the team left for Philadelphia, and Yost had Smith practice snapping the ball in the aisle of the Pullman car that took the team east. At every stop on the trip, Yost also had Smith practice his long snaps on the station platforms. Smith ended up playing so well at the position against Penn and Minnesota that he was selected by Walter Eckersall as the first-team center on his All-Western team. Michigan's captain, Allerdice, played the game with his hand in bandages after breaking a small bone in his left hand.

Right halfback Joe Magidsohn scored both of Michigan's touchdowns within the first ten minutes of the start of the game. Allerdice kicked both extra points. The first touchdown was scored less than two minutes into the game and was set up by a trick play. With the ball at the 22-yard line, Michigan lined up to kick a field goal, but the formation was a fake. William Wasmund took the snap from center and ran backward and to his left. Wasmund tossed the ball back to Dave Allerdice who was trailing behind Wasmund. Allerdice began running with the ball, then stopped behind the blocking of the fullback. Allerdice passed to Magidsohn who was running toward the right sideline. Magidsohn caught the ball at the 26-yard line and ran downfield before he was tackled at the five-yard line. Magidsohn scored on a short run two players later, and Allerdice kicked the extra point.

Michigan's second touchdown followed a fumble by Penn quarterback Miller. Michigan drove 80 yards on five plays, with Magidsohn carrying on four of the five plays. On the final play of the drive, with the ball at Penn's 25-yard line, Wasmund took the snap and circled to his right with the other backs, creating the appearance of a mass play to the right side. Wasmund then tossed the ball to Magidsohn at the 35-yard line. With the defense moving in the direction of the apparent mass play, Magidsohn ran left into a clear field with Edmunds and Wells blocking for him. After Michigan took a 12–0 lead, Penn scored a touchdown and extra point with only one minute remaining in the first half.

For Wasmund, the victory over Penn was his final game for Michigan. After being sharply criticized for his role in the loss to Notre Dame one week earlier, the victory provided redemption. E. A. Batchelor wrote:

"Billy Wasmund has been the subject of much criticism this fall. Today was his last chance for Michigan and he rose to the opportunity in a manner that will place his name among those of Michigan's beloved. He had both nerve and judgment today. He knew what to do and when to do it and Yost himself could not have run the team any better."

In the second half, Yost directed his team in a kicking game, and neither team scored. Penn made 10 substitutions during the game, while Michigan made only one – Ranney replacing Conklin at left end. As the game ended, "[t]he few frenzied Michigan rooters rushed on the field and bore Coach Yost on their shoulders to the Wolverines' dressing room." As the Michigan players and fans carried Yost from the field, the band from the USS Michigan played "Michigan, My Michigan."

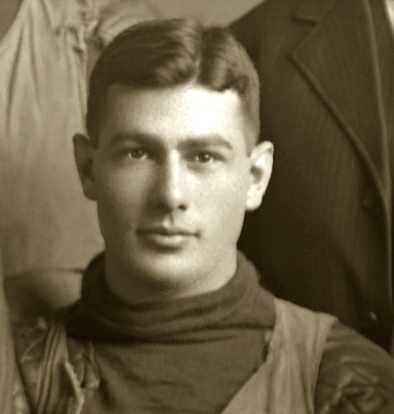
Joe Magidsohn was Michigan's first Jewish football player.

The Chicago Daily Tribune wrote: "Bewildered and dazed by a style of football they never had before encountered the Red and Blue warriors were playthings in the hands of the sturdy westerners in the first ten minutes of the game when the Wolverines tallied all their points." The Tribune singled out Magidsohn for particular attention:

"Michigan's remarkable offense was built about a half back who earned a place in football's hall of fame by his work today. His name is Magidsohn, and it long will be remembered at Penn. Magidsohn was irresistible on the offense, tearing great holes in the Quaker defense and scoring both touchdowns. In addition, he tackled fiercely and spoiled Penn's best efforts at the forward pass."

Joe Magidsohn, who was the first Jewish player to win a varsity "M" at the University of Michigan, later said of the Penn game: "That 1909 Michigan-Penn game is the one I regard as my greatest . . . My All-America teammate, halfback and captain, Dave Allerdice, had a broken left hand so I was obliged to do most of the ball carrying."

The New York Times credited the play of Allerdice, Magidsohn, Wasmund and Benbrook, and wrote: "The Western men were physically superior in weight and in other respects to the Eastern players, and in teamwork they moved with a precision that showed careful preparation and good generalship." A two-page account of the game in the 1910 Michiganensian (the University of Michigan yearbook) boasted that "never in the history of the game has there been a clash that attracted and held the interest of the spectators as did the Michigan-Pennsylvania contest of 1909." The Michiganensian continued: "Football is not a serious thing to many people, but the stand made by Allerdice and his men against Pennsylvania meant something. It meant that Michigan had her fill of the dregs; she was on the climb again."

Michigan's lineup against Penn was Conklin and Ranney (left end), Casey (left tackle), Benbrook (left guard), Smith (center), Edmunds (right guard), Wells (right tackle), Miller (right end), Wasmund (quarterback), Magidsohn (left halfback), Allerdice (right halfback), and Clark (fullback). The game was played in 35-minute halves. The referee was Langford from Trinity.

=== At Minnesota ===
Michigan at Minnesota

Team	1	2	Total
• Michigan	6	9	15
Minnesota	6	0	6

- Date: November 20, 1909
- Location: Northrop Field • Minneapolis
- Referee: Lieut. Beavers (West Point)

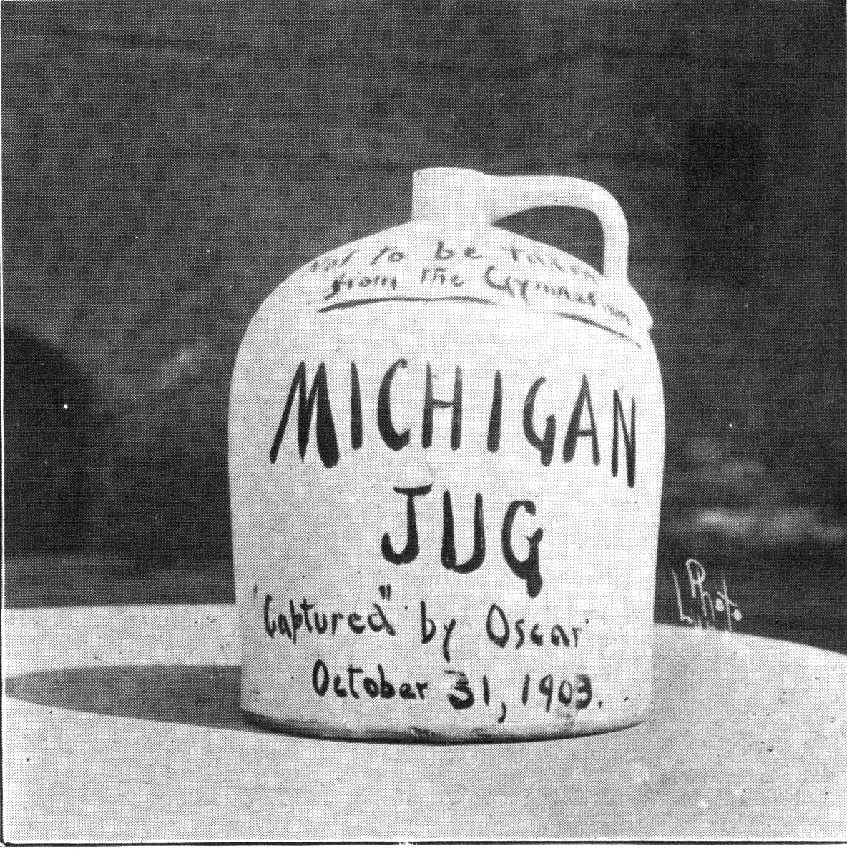
Photograph of the "Michigan Jug" (which was neither little nor brown) from the 1909 Michiganensian

Michigan concluded its 1909 season with a game against Minnesota in Minneapolis. It was the eighth meeting between the two football programs, but the first since a 6–6 tie in 1903 that ended Michigan's 29-game winning streak. The day after the 1903 game, Minnesota's custodian Oscar Munson brought an earthenware jug to L. J. Cooke, head of the Minnesota athletics department, and declared in a thick Scandinavian accent: "Yost left his yug." Accounts differ as to the history of the jug and how Munson came to be in possession of it. Cooke and Munson painted the jug and wrote on it, "Michigan Jug – Captured by Oscar, October 31, 1903" along with the score "Michigan 6, Minnesota 6". Cooke wrote to Yost: "We have your little brown jug; if you want it, you'll have to win it." Michigan accepted the challenge, and the teams finally met three years later on November 20, 1909. The teams continue to play each year for the Little Brown Jug, the oldest rivalry trophy in American college football.

The 1909 Minnesota team came into the game as the Western Conference champions and with an undefeated record, having soundly defeated Iowa (41–0), Iowa State (18–0), Nebraska (14–0), Chicago (20–6), and Wisconsin (34–6). The Golden Gophers were led by 1909's first-team All-American quarterback John McGovern, who was later inducted into the College Football Hall of Fame. On the day before the game, the University of Minnesota's chapel was packed for a mass meeting to celebrate the team's Western Conference championship. The students opened with Minnesota's traditional "Ski-U-Mah" cheer, and a large banner with the words "Western Champions" was raised above the players. University of Minnesota President Cyrus Northrop spoke to the crowd and confidently predicted that the Gophers would realize their fondest dreams the next day by humbling a team coached by Fielding H. Yost.

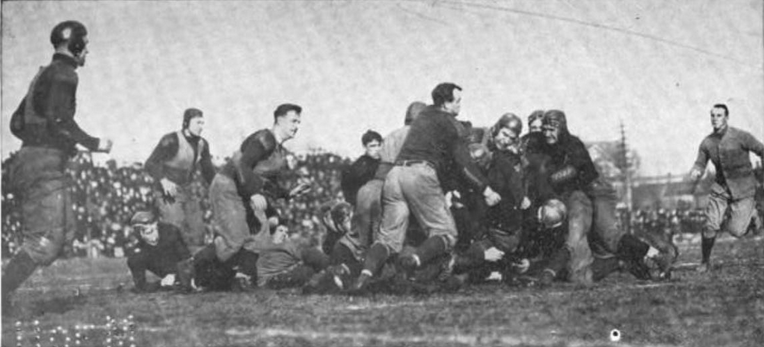
Michigan vs. Minnesota, 1909

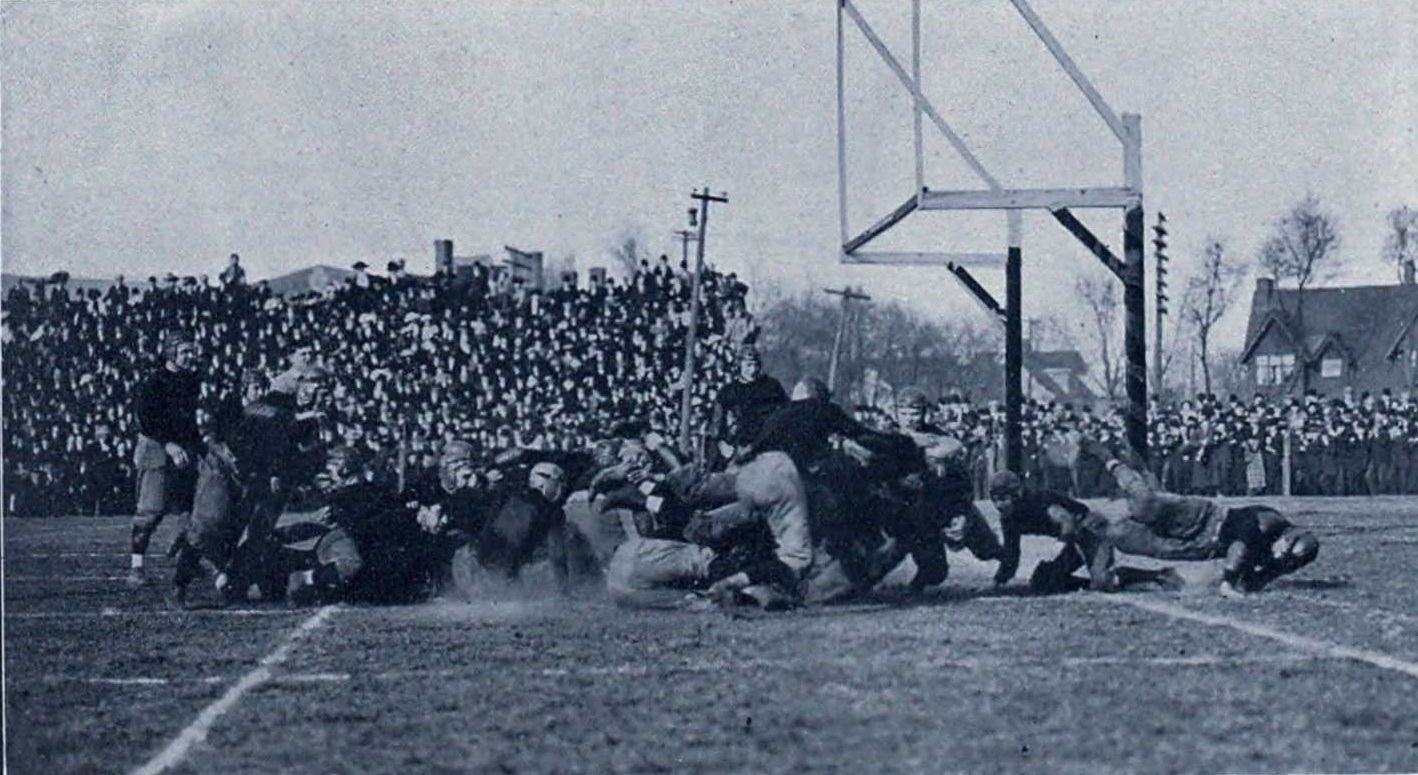
Michigan vs. Minnesota, 1909

Michigan was placed at a further disadvantage because its starting quarterback William Wasmund was not permitted to play. Wasmund was playing his fourth year of college football in 1909, and a Western Conference rule prohibited the use of players who had already played three years. Even though Michigan was no longer a member of the conference, Minnesota remained in the conference, and Wasmund was therefore not permitted to play. James Joy Miller replaced Wasmund at quarterback on offense, but returned to his end position when the team played on defense.

Despite the loss of Wasmund and a rigorous travel schedule that had taken the Wolverines in the preceding days by train from Ann Arbor to Philadelphia, Philadelphia to Ann Arbor, and Ann Arbor to Minneapolis, the Wolverines won the game by a score of 15–6 and, with the win, the right to bring the Little Brown Jug to Ann Arbor. The 1909 game began at 2:01 p.m. and was played in front of 25,000 spectators at Northrop Field. Several inches of snow had to be removed from the field before the game began. As in the Penn game, Joe Magidsohn scored both of Michigan's touchdowns. Dave Allerdice kicked two extra points and a field goal. The teams each scored a touchdown in the first half and went into halftime with the score tied at 6 to 6.

At halftime, Michigan's 24-piece band merged with Minnesota's 80-piece band and marched around the field "playing popular Minnesota and Michigan airs." Walter Eckersall wrote that the halftime show "probably surpasses anything ever seen on a football field." In addition to the marching band show, halftime saw a flurry of betting, with Minnesota fans "demanding even money" and several thousand dollars being wagered on the outcome.

In the second half, Magidsohn put Michigan in the lead when he intercepted a pass and returned it for a touchdown. Eckersall described the game-winning interception: "As the oval was sailing through the air, he judged his distance, leaped perfectly, and grabbed the ball on the dead run. Without a Minnesota man around him, he sprinted thirty-five yards for Michigan's second touchdown." Allerdice kicked the extra point. Later in the second half, Pattengill made a fair catch at the Minnesota 42-yard line, and Michigan exercised its right to a free kick for a field goal. According to Eckersall, "Allerdice elected to place kick and sent the oval straight and true as a bullet over the cross bar between the uprights for Michigan's final score." Michigan's statistical totals for the game were 212 yards on the ground, zero yards on forward passes, 164 yards on kickoff and punt returns, 70 yards lost on penalties, and 12 first downs. Minnesota's quarterback McGovern attempted three field goals, but missed on each. Allerdice also attempted three field goals for Michigan and was successful on one.

The Michigan Alumnus named Magidsohn and Benbrook as Michigan's leading players in the game. With respect to Magidsohn, it wrote:

"Magidsohn as an offensive player proved that he had no equal in the west. It was largely due to his terrific line plunging and his off-tackle runs that Michigan made its score in the first half, the first count of the game, and it was his intercepting Pickering's forward pass in the second half that gave Michigan her second touchdown. On defense, he played remarkably well and frequently threw a Minnesota runner for a loss."

With respect to Benbrook, the Alumnus wrote: "He was all over the field, seemingly at the same time, he brought down runners who thought they were safely clear of opponents, he broke through the opposing line to get a man behind, he tore great gashes in the Gopher defense through which Magidsohn and Allerdice and Freeney and Greene hurled themselves for big gains and he never failed to help push or pull when every bit of help was needed."

The New York Times called it "the hardest fought game seen on a Western gridiron this year." Writing in the Chicago Daily Tribune, Eckersall opined that the Michigan team played "the best football of any Michigan team since 1905" and singled out the "star work" of Benbrook who he called "the best linesman in the west today without exception." On the game as a whole, Eckersall wrote:

"Today's struggle was one of the prettiest that possibly could be imagined. The game abounded in all sorts of football . . . The complicated shift plays of both elevens were executed with marvelous precision and plainly showed the heights of football perfection to which these teams had attained. . . . The game was a thriller and was prolific of the best football played in the west this season. Both teams had an old grudge to settle, and the players battled until every ounce of physical energy was exhausted. Not a play or a trick in the category of either team was overlooked by either field general, and extreme but fair and clean methods were employed to win the contest."

After the game, the Minnesota team presented the Michigan team with the water jug from the 1903 game. Minnesota's coach, Henry L. Williams, said at the time, "We're giving it back with the understanding that we can have it again should we win from you next year." After the game, the two teams also attended a banquet at which "the foes showered verbal bouquets at each other all evening."

Michigan's lineup against Minnesota was Conklin and Ranney (left end), Casey (left tackle), Benbrook (left guard), Smith (center), Edmunds and Watkins (right guard), Wells (right tackle), Pattengill (right end), Miller (quarterback), Magidsohn (left halfback), Allerdice (right halfback), and Freeney and Green (fullback). The game was played in 35-minute halves. The referee was Lieut. Beavers from West Point. The umpire was Hinkey from Yale.

=== Post-season ===
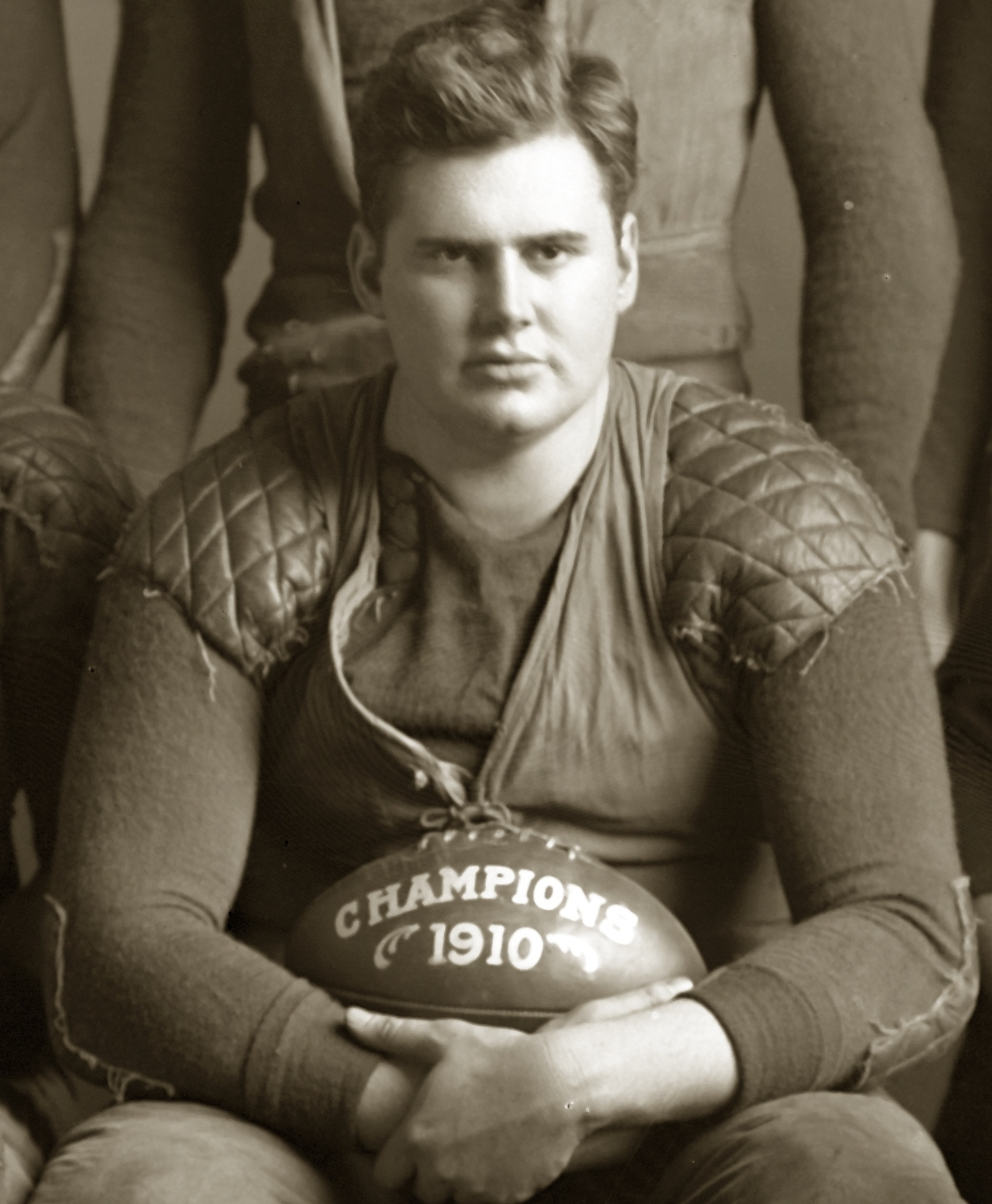
Albert Benbrook was the first Western lineman to be picked as a first-team All-American by Walter Camp.

At the conclusion of the 1909 season, Walter Eckersall praised Yost's efforts in developing the team "to the point where they now are entitled to be ranked with the famous Michigan teams of 1901 to 1905." Yost's contract with Michigan expired at the end of the 1909 season, but on December 1, 1909, he signed a contract to remain the head football coach at Michigan through the 1911 season.

At the end of the season, the choice for "Champions of the West" was a matter for debate. Minnesota had won the Western Conference championship but had been beaten decisively by Michigan. Notre Dame had beaten Michigan, but had played a weak schedule and tied Marquette in the last game of the season. E. A. Batchelor of the Detroit Free Press was unabashed in declaring, "Michigan again is champion of the west." The 1910 Michiganensian also declared the 1909 Michigan team as "Champions of the West." However, in the Chicago Daily Tribune, Eckersall concluded that the honor must be given to Notre Dame:

"Coach Yost's players were not at their best when they met Notre Dame, and if the two teams were to meet next Saturday, Michigan in all probability would be the winner. However, results count, and Notre Dame should be given full credit for its achievement."

Coach Yost noted that Notre Dame's season-ending tie with Marquette would make the critics who picked Notre Dame as western champion "revise their dope", but stated publicly that he did not care who the critics chose:

"Meechigan isn't worrying about the championship. We stand on our record, y' know, and don't care how the critics dope us out. . . . Let them fight it out in the newspapers, y' know. We are satisfied. The games that counted Michigan won."

Yale and Harvard were widely recognized as the top two teams in the country, and some writers opined that Michigan was the third best team in the country after Yale and Harvard. One eastern critic explained his choice of Michigan as the third best team in the country as follows:

"The Wolverines have but one defeat to their discredit. This was at the hands of Notre Dame, a very powerful team which caught Michigan unprepared and off her guard. One week later, Michigan played a very superior game and outplayed the University of Pennsylvania. The Pennsylvania victory was the making of the Michigan eleven. It put new courage and new confidence into Yost's men and when they met Minnesota, the conference champions, they completely outplayed them."

Several Michigan players received national or regional awards. Walter Camp selected Albert Benbrook as a first-team player on his All-American team in Collier's Weekly. He was only the fifth Western player, and the first lineman from a Western team, to receive first-team honors from Camp. Michigan's halfbacks Dave Allerdice and Joe Magidsohn were selected as second-team players on Camp's All-American team. Left tackle William Casey was a third-team selection by Camp. The New York Times and syndicated sports columnist Tommy Clark selected Allerdice as a first-team player on their All-American teams.

In the Chicago Daily Tribune, Walter Eckersall picked an All-Western team that included four Wolverines as first-team players. The Michigan players receiving first-team honors from Eckersall were Benbrook, Allerdice, Magidsohn (who he called "a demon on the offense"), and center Andrew W. Smith. In announcing his selection of Smith, Eckersall wrote: "Smith is by far the best center in this section. Yost experimented with this player until the Pennsylvania game ... Finally, as a last resort the coach tried him at center, where he proved to be one of the finds of the season. He is a hard, aggressive player, who does not know the meaning of the word quit. ... With more experience he should develop into one of the best pivot men the west has ever produced."

Fielding Yost selected an All-Western team for the Detroit Free Press and named six Michigan players to his first team. In addition to the four Wolverines chosen by Eckersall, Yost also chose James Joy Miller at right end and William Casey at left tackle. Yost excluded Notre Dame players from consideration on grounds that "the Longman team has so many men who are ineligible under college rules as accepted by the leading teams, that it is not properly to be classed with the others who observe stricter regulations." He noted that four of Notre Dame's biggest stars (Dolan, Miller, Dimmick and Philbrook) would be ineligible to play for most colleges, and one of them had played nine years of college football. Yost named McGovern of Minnesota as his quarterback "even though he showed nothing" against Michigan and was made to "look like a schoolboy" by Michigan's Joy Miller.

== Players ==
=== Letter winners ===
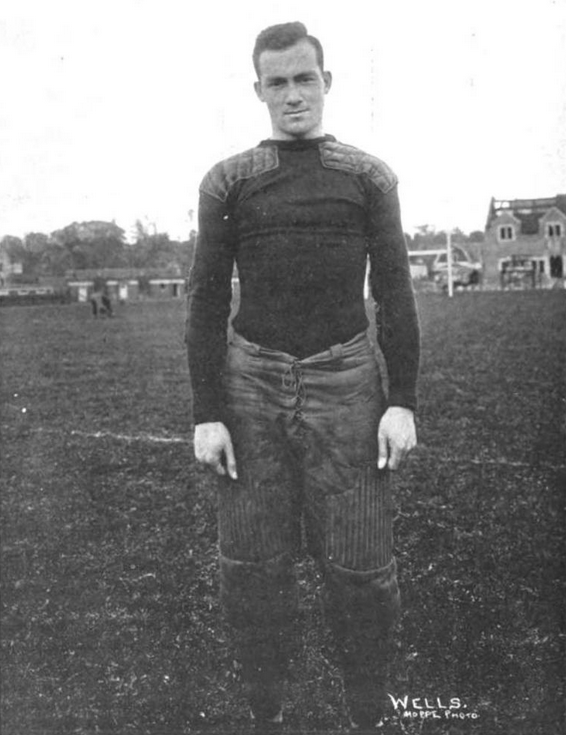
Right tackle Stanfield Wells became an All-American in 1910, photo c. 1911.

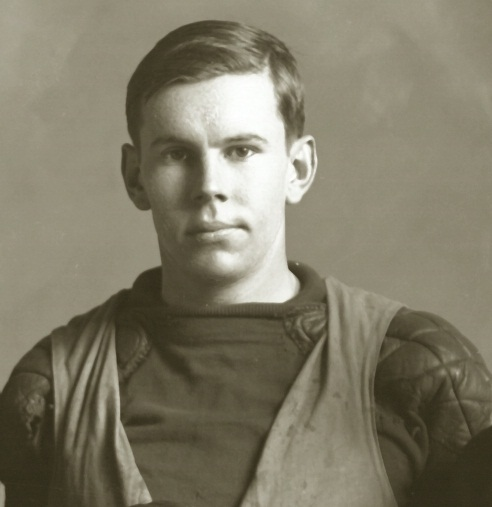
Center James K. Watkins became commissioner of the Detroit Police Department.

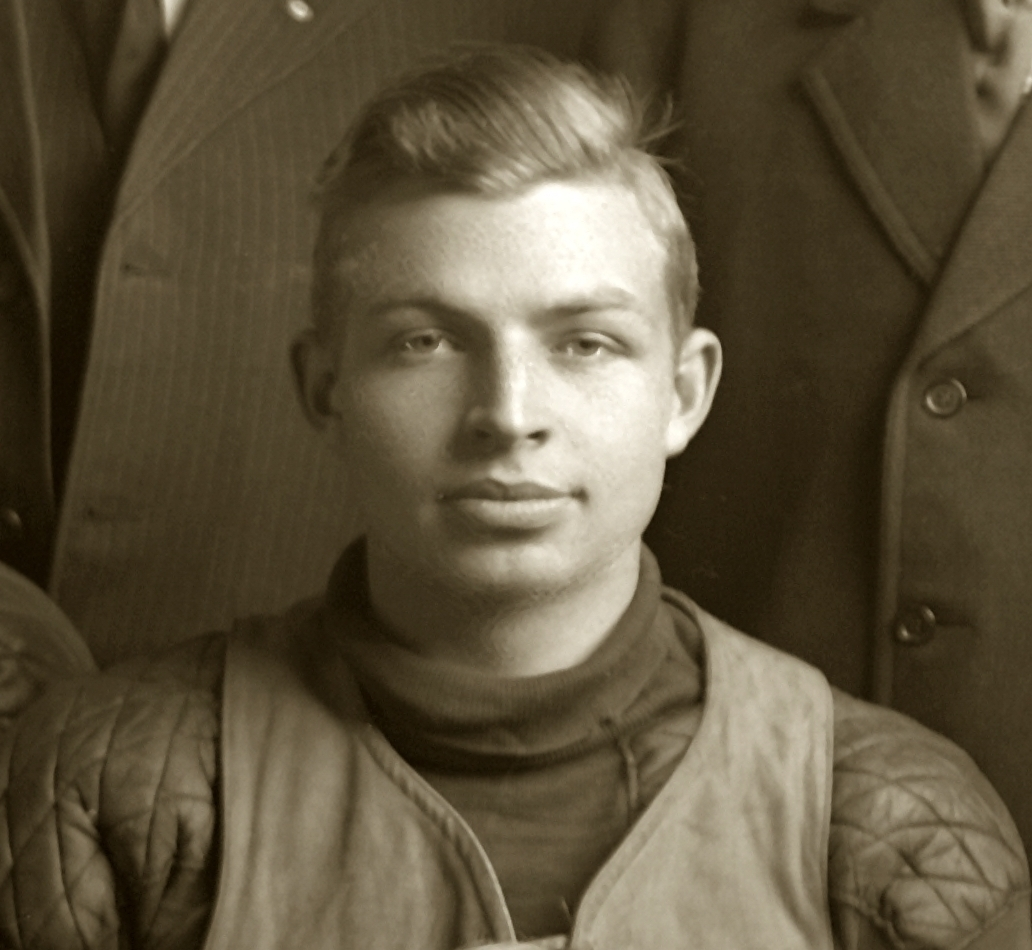
Frederick Conklin became a Rear Admiral in the U.S. Navy and decorated John F. Kennedy for service in World War II.

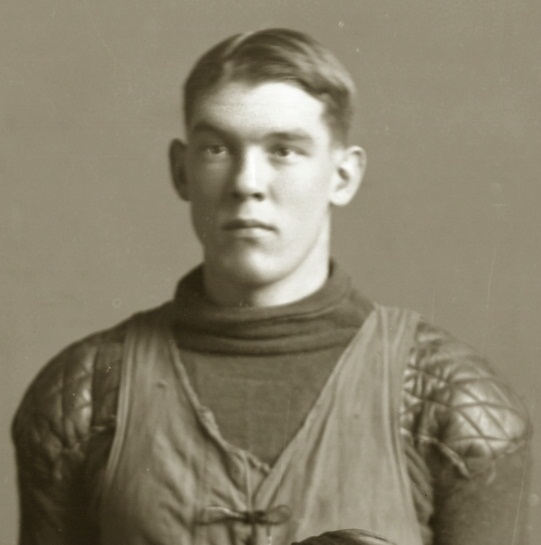
Fullback George M. Lawton became the head football coach at the University of Detroit.

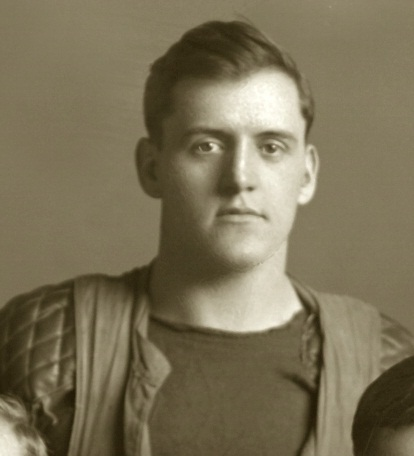
Lineman William P. Edmunds missed three games after dislocating his collarbone against Ohio State.

On November 24, 1909, varsity "M" letters were awarded to 16 players, including every man who played in either the Pennsylvania or Minnesota game. The recipients of varsity letters for 1909 were:

- Dave Allerdice, Indianapolis – started all 7 games at right halfback
- Albert Benbrook, Chicago – started all 7 games at left guard
- William M. Casey, Cedar Falls, Iowa – started last 5 games of the season at left tackle
- Fay G. Clark, San Bernardino, California – started 2 games (Notre Dame and Penn) at fullback; also appeared as a substitute at fullback against Ohio State, Marquette, and Syracuse
- Frederick Conklin, Ann Arbor, Michigan – started 2 games (Penn and Minnesota) at left end and 2 games (Marquette and Notre Dame) at right guard; also appeared as a substitute at right guard against Ohio State and Syracuse
- William P. Edmunds, Youngstown, Ohio – started 2 games (Case and Ohio State) at left tackle and 2 games (Penn and Minnesota) at right guard
- Charles C. "Doc" Freeney, Ida Grove, Iowa – started 1 game (Ohio State) at left halfback and 1 game (Minnesota) at fullback; also appeared as a substitute at left halfback against Syracuse
- Donald W. Green – appeared as a substitute at left halfback against Syracuse and at fullback against Minnesota
- Joe Magidsohn, Elkton, Michigan – started the last 5 games at left halfback; also appeared as a substitute at left halfback in the first 2 games
- James Joy Miller, Detroit – started 4 games (Marquette, Syracuse, Notre Dame, Penn) at right end, 1 game (Minnesota) at quarterback
- Victor R. "Vic" Pattengill, Lansing, Michigan – 1 game (Minnesota) at right end; also appeared as a substitute at left end against Ohio State
- Leroy W. "Roy" Ranney, Greenville, Michigan – started 1 game at left end
- Andrew William Smith, Ann Arbor, Michigan – started 3 games (Case, Ohio State, Syracuse) at right guard, 2 games (Penn and Minnesota) at center
- William Wasmund, Detroit – started the first 6 games of the season at quarterback; ineligible to play against Minnesota
- James K. Watkins, Ann Arbor, Michigan – started the first 5 games of the season at center; also appeared as a substitute at right guard against Minnesota
- Stanfield Wells, Brewster, Michigan – started all 7 games at right tackle

=== Reserves ===
On December 6, 1909, athletic director Philip Barthelme announced that 27 players would receive "R" letters for their participation as reserves on the 1909 varsity football team. They are:

- Harry K. Allwart, Battle Creek, Michigan
- Neil P. Beall, Gallipolis, Ohio
- Arthur E. Bertrand, Muskegon, Michigan – started 1 game (Case) at left halfback
- Stanley Borleske, Spokane, Washington – started 2 games (Case and Ohio State) at right end and 1 game (Notre Dame) at left end; also appeared as a substitute at left end against Syracuse
- Otto Carpell, Saginaw, Michigan
- Wilbur M. Cunningham, Benton Harbor, Michigan
- Lewis E. Daniels, guard, Cambridge, Massachusetts
- Abraham B. Feldman, Eveleth, Minnesota
- Gardner
- William H. Harsha, Portsmouth, Ohio
- Ralph J. Hurlburt, Portland, Oregon
- Allen Jeffery, Albion, Michigan
- Howard S. Kayner, center, Gasport, New York – appeared as a substitute at the center position against Syracuse
- Philip T. Kniskern, Hastings, Michigan
- Sidney S. Lawrence, Coopersville, Michigan
- George M. Lawton, Detroit – started 4 games (Case, Ohio State, Marquette, and Syracuse) at fullback; also appeared as a substitute at fullback against Notre Dame
- John J. McDermott, Hubbardston, Michigan
- Karl H. Middendorf, Akron, Ohio
- Frank Murphy, Harbor Beach, Michigan
- William Kirke Otis, Honeoye Falls, New York
- Edgar M. Parkhurst, Reed City, Michigan
- Prince
- Charles E. Rickerhauser, Los Angeles
- Jamie W. Rogers, Ozark, Michigan – started 3 games (Case, Ohio State and Marquette) at left end; also appeared as a substitute at left end against Notre Dame
- John Byron Rogers, end, Ozark, Michigan
- Rufus G. Siple, Ann Arbor, Michigan
- Theodore A. Weager, Interlaken, New York

=== Scoring leaders ===
Player	Touchdowns	Extra points	Field goals	Points
Dave Allerdice	3	15	7	51
Joe Magidsohn	4	0	0	20
George M. Lawton	3	0	0	15
Stanley Borleske	2	0	0	10
Stanfield Wells	2	0	0	10
James Joy Miller	1	0	0	5
William Wasmund	1	0	0	5
Totals	16	15	7	116

== Awards and honors ==
- Captain: Dave Allerdice
- All-Americans: Albert Benbrook (Walter Camp 1st team), Dave Allerdice (New York Times 1st team; Tommy Clark 1st team; Walter Camp 2nd team); Joe Magidsohn (Walter Camp 2nd team); William Casey (Walter Camp 3rd team)
- All-Western: Albert Benbrook (Eckersall 1st team; Yost 1st team), Andrew Smith (Eckersall 1st team; Yost 1st team), Dave Allerdice (Eckersall 1st team; Yost 1st team), and Joe Magidsohn (Eckersall 1st team; Yost 1st team); William Casey (Yost 1st team); James Joy Miller (Yost 1st team)

== Coaching staff ==
- Head coach: Fielding H. Yost
- Assistant coaches: Roy Beechler, Albert R. Chandler, Prentiss Douglass, Forrest M. Hall, Paul Magoffin, Curtis Redden
- Trainer: Keene Fitzpatrick
- Manager: Harold A. Gallup
