= 1909 Rose Polytechnic football team =

American college football season

1909 Rose Polytechnic football
- Conference: Independent
- Record: 4–4
- Head coach: Heze Clark (2nd season)
- Captain: Standau (right tackle)

1909 Midwestern college football independents records
	Conf.			Overall
Team	W	L	T	W		L		T
Iowa State Normal		–		6	–	0	–	0
Notre Dame		–		7	–	0	–	1
Michigan Agricultural		–		8	–	1	–	0
Carthage		–		6	–	1	–	0
Michigan		–		6	–	1	–	0
Western State Normal		–		6	–	1	–	0
Mount Union		–		8	–	2	–	0
Lake Forest		–		5	–	1	–	1
Haskell		–		7	–	2	–	0
Detroit College		–		3	–	1	–	2
Butler		–		5	–	3	–	0
Central Michigan		–		4	–	3	–	0
St. Mary's (OH)		–		4	–	3	–	0
Cincinnati		–		4	–	3	–	1
Doane		–		3	–	2	–	3
Buchtel		–		4	–	4	–	0
Rose Poly		–		4	–	4	–	0
Marquette		–		2	–	2	–	1
North Dakota Agricultural		–		2	–	2	–	1
Wabash		–		3	–	4	–	1
Miami (OH)		–		3	–	4	–	0
Ohio		–		2	–	4	–	2
Saint Louis		–		3	–	5	–	0
Michigan State Normal		–		2	–	4	–	0
Western Illinois		–		1	–	2	–	0
Fairmount		–		2	–	5	–	1
Northern Illinois State		–		2	–	6	–	0
South Dakota State		–		1	–	3	–	0
Heidelberg		–		0	–	7	–	2

The 1909 Rose Polytechnic football team represented Rose Polytechnic Institute—now known as Rose–Hulman Institute of Technology—as an independent during the 1909 college football season. Led by second-year head coach Heze Clark, Rose Poly compiled a 4–4 record, and played a tough schedule that included Vanderbilt, Notre Dame, Kentucky State College, and Purdue. Against Notre Dame, Rose Poly was crushed 60 to 11, but managed to score the first touchdown against the Fighting Irish in two years.

== Schedule ==
Date	Time	Opponent	Site	Result	Attendance	Source
October 2		Eastern Illinois	Terre Haute, IN	W 75–0		
October 9		Vanderbilt	Dudley Field; Nashville, TN	L 3–28		
October 16		Notre Dame	Cartier Field; Notre Dame, IN	L 11–60		
October 23		DePauw	Terre Haute, IN	W 8–5		
October 28		Kentucky State College	Stoll Field; Lexington, KY	L 0–43		
November 6	3:00 p.m.	Butler	Terre Haute, IN	W 12–6	800	
November 13		Purdue	Stuart Field; West Lafayette, IN	L 3–24		
November 25		Franklin (IN)	Terre Haute, IN	W 58–12		
