= Clayton B. Simmons =

American osteopath (1876–1922)

Biographical details
- Born: October 11, 1876; Oil City, Pennsylvania, U.S.
- Died: July 24, 1922 (aged 45); Excelsior Springs, Missouri, U.S.
- Education: Colgate (1904)

Coaching career (HC unless noted)

Football
- 1908–1909: Iowa State Normal
- 1910–1911: Kirksville Normal

Basketball
- 1909–1910: Iowa State Normal

Head coaching record
- Overall: 14–9 (football); 4–3 (basketball)

Clayton Byron Simmons (October 11, 1876 – July 24, 1922) was an American osteopath and college football and college basketball coach. He served as the head football coach Iowa State Normal School—renamed Iowa State Teachers College in 1909 and now known a s University of Northern Iowa—in Cedar Falls, Iowa from 1908 to 1909 and at the First District Normal School—commonly known then as Kirksville Normal now known as Truman State University—in Kirksville, Missouri from 1910 to 1911, compiling a career college football coaching record of 14–9. Simmons was also the head basketball coach at Iowa State Teachers for one season, in 1909–10, tallying a mark of 4–3.

Simmons was a 1904 graduate of Colgate University. He was also a graduate of the Kansas City School of Medicine and the American School of Osteopathy. Simmons was born in Oil City, Pennsylvania. He died on July 24, 1922, in Excelsior Springs, Missouri.

== Head coaching record ==
=== Football ===
Year	Team	Overall	Conference	Standing	Bowl/playoffs
Iowa State Normal (Independent) (1908–1909)
1908	Iowa State Normal	5–0			
1909	Iowa State Normal	6–0			
Iowa State Normal:		11–0			
Kirksville Normal (Independent) (1910–1911)
1910	Kirksville Normal	3–4			
1911	Kirksville Normal	0–5			
Kirksville Normal:		3–9			
Total:		14–9			
