= 1909 Saint Louis Blue and White football team =

American college football season

1909 Saint Louis Blue and White football
- Conference: Independent
- Record: 3–5
- Head coach: Bill Warner (1st season)
- Home stadium: Kulage's Park, League Park

1909 Midwestern college football independents records
	Conf.			Overall
Team	W	L	T	W		L		T
Iowa State Normal		–		6	–	0	–	0
Notre Dame		–		7	–	0	–	1
Michigan Agricultural		–		8	–	1	–	0
Carthage		–		6	–	1	–	0
Michigan		–		6	–	1	–	0
Western State Normal		–		6	–	1	–	0
Mount Union		–		8	–	2	–	0
Lake Forest		–		5	–	1	–	1
Haskell		–		7	–	2	–	0
Detroit College		–		3	–	1	–	2
Butler		–		5	–	3	–	0
Central Michigan		–		4	–	3	–	0
St. Mary's (OH)		–		4	–	3	–	0
Cincinnati		–		4	–	3	–	1
Doane		–		3	–	2	–	3
Buchtel		–		4	–	4	–	0
Rose Poly		–		4	–	4	–	0
Marquette		–		2	–	2	–	1
North Dakota Agricultural		–		2	–	2	–	1
Wabash		–		3	–	4	–	1
Miami (OH)		–		3	–	4	–	0
Ohio		–		2	–	4	–	2
Saint Louis		–		3	–	5	–	0
Michigan State Normal		–		2	–	4	–	0
Western Illinois		–		1	–	2	–	0
Fairmount		–		2	–	5	–	1
Northern Illinois State		–		2	–	6	–	0
South Dakota State		–		1	–	3	–	0
Heidelberg		–		0	–	7	–	2

The 1909 Saint Louis Blue and White football team was an American football team that represented Saint Louis University as an independent during the 1909 college football season. In its first and only season under head coach Bill Warner, the team compiled a 3–5 record and was outscored by a total of 84 to 74.

== Schedule ==
Date	Time	Opponent	Site	Result	Attendance	Source
October 2	3:30 p.m.	Missouri Mines	Kulage's Park; St. Louis, MO	L 0–3		
October 9	3:00 p.m.	Drury	League Park; St. Louis, MO	L 5–8		
October 16	3:30 p.m.	Cape Girardeau Normal	League Park; St. Louis, MO	W 28–0		
October 23		Wabash	League Park; St. Louis, MO	W 14–0		
October 30	3:00 p.m.	Indiana	League Park; St. Louis, MO	L 0–30	4,000	
November 6		Miami (OH)	League Park; St. Louis, MO	W 22–0		
November 13	3:00 p.m.	Oklahoma	League Park; St. Louis, MO	L 5–11	2,500	
November 25		Carlisle	League Park; St. Louis, MO	L 0–32	12,000	
