= 1909 Iowa State Normals football team =

American college football season

1909 Iowa State Normals football
- Conference: Independent
- Record: 6–0
- Head coach: Clayton B. Simmons (2nd season)

1909 Midwestern college football independents records
	Conf.			Overall
Team	W	L	T	W		L		T
Iowa State Normal		–		6	–	0	–	0
Notre Dame		–		7	–	0	–	1
Michigan Agricultural		–		8	–	1	–	0
Carthage		–		6	–	1	–	0
Michigan		–		6	–	1	–	0
Western State Normal		–		6	–	1	–	0
Mount Union		–		8	–	2	–	0
Lake Forest		–		5	–	1	–	1
Haskell		–		7	–	2	–	0
Detroit College		–		3	–	1	–	2
Butler		–		5	–	3	–	0
Central Michigan		–		4	–	3	–	0
St. Mary's (OH)		–		4	–	3	–	0
Cincinnati		–		4	–	3	–	1
Doane		–		3	–	2	–	3
Buchtel		–		4	–	4	–	0
Rose Poly		–		4	–	4	–	0
Marquette		–		2	–	2	–	1
North Dakota Agricultural		–		2	–	2	–	1
Wabash		–		3	–	4	–	1
Miami (OH)		–		3	–	4	–	0
Ohio		–		2	–	4	–	2
Saint Louis		–		3	–	5	–	0
Michigan State Normal		–		2	–	4	–	0
Western Illinois		–		1	–	2	–	0
Fairmount		–		2	–	5	–	1
Northern Illinois State		–		2	–	6	–	0
South Dakota State		–		1	–	3	–	0
Heidelberg		–		0	–	7	–	2

The 1909 Iowa State Normals football team represented Iowa State Normal School (later renamed University of Northern Iowa) as an independent during the 1909 college football season. In its second and final season under head coach Clayton B. Simmons, the team compiled a 6–0 record, shut out four of six opponents, and outscored all opponents by a total of 131 to 32.

== Schedule ==
Date	Opponent	Site	Result	Source
October 2	Charles City	College grounds; Cedar Falls, IA	W 28–0	
October 9	Lenox	Cedar Falls, IA	W 36–0	
October 16	Leander Clark	Cedar Falls, IA	W 5–0	
October 23	at St. Joseph's (IA)	Dubuque, Iowa	W 32–16	
November 6	Coe	Cedar Falls, IA	W 5–0	
November 13	at Grinnell	Grinnell, Iowa	W 24–6	
