= 1909 Cincinnati football team =

American college football season

1909 Cincinnati football
- Conference: Independent
- Record: 4–3–1
- Head coach: Robert Burch (1st season)
- Captain: Ernest DuBray
- Home stadium: League Park

1909 Midwestern college football independents records
	Conf.			Overall
Team	W	L	T	W		L		T
Iowa State Normal		–		6	–	0	–	0
Notre Dame		–		7	–	0	–	1
Michigan Agricultural		–		8	–	1	–	0
Carthage		–		6	–	1	–	0
Michigan		–		6	–	1	–	0
Western State Normal		–		6	–	1	–	0
Mount Union		–		8	–	2	–	0
Lake Forest		–		5	–	1	–	1
Haskell		–		7	–	2	–	0
Detroit College		–		3	–	1	–	2
Butler		–		5	–	3	–	0
Central Michigan		–		4	–	3	–	0
St. Mary's (OH)		–		4	–	3	–	0
Cincinnati		–		4	–	3	–	1
Doane		–		3	–	2	–	3
Buchtel		–		4	–	4	–	0
Rose Poly		–		4	–	4	–	0
Marquette		–		2	–	2	–	1
North Dakota Agricultural		–		2	–	2	–	1
Wabash		–		3	–	4	–	1
Miami (OH)		–		3	–	4	–	0
Ohio		–		2	–	4	–	2
Saint Louis		–		3	–	5	–	0
Michigan State Normal		–		2	–	4	–	0
Western Illinois		–		1	–	2	–	0
Fairmount		–		2	–	5	–	1
Northern Illinois State		–		2	–	6	–	0
South Dakota State		–		1	–	3	–	0
Heidelberg		–		0	–	7	–	2

The 1909 Cincinnati football team was an American football team that represented the University of Cincinnati as an independent during the 1909 college football season. Led by first-year head coach Robert Burch, Cincinnati compiled a record of 4–3–1. Ernest DuBray was the team captain. The team played home games at League Park in Cincinnati.

== Schedule ==
Date	Time	Opponent	Site	Result	Attendance	Source
October 2		at Hanover	Madison, IN	W 6–2		
October 9	2:15 p.m.	Wittenberg	League Park; Cincinnati, OH	W 22–5		
October 16	2:30 p.m.	Otterbein	League Park; Cincinnati, OH	L 3–15		
October 23	3:00 p.m.	at Transylvania	Transylvania Field; Lexington, KY	T 6–6	150–200	
October 30	2:30 p.m.	Central University	League Park; Cincinnati, OH	L 0–34		
November 6		at Tulane	Tulane Stadium; New Orleans, LA	L 0–6		
November 13		Butler	League Park; Cincinnati, OH	W 22–0		
November 25	10:30 a.m.	Miami (OH)	League Park; Cincinnati, OH (Victory Bell)	W 10–6		
