= 1909 Western State Normal Hilltoppers football team =

American college football season

1909 Western State Normal Hilltoppers football
- Conference: Independent
- Record: 6–1
- Head coach: William H. Spaulding (3rd season)
- Captain: John McGuiness
- Home stadium: Woodward Avenue grounds

1909 Midwestern college football independents records
	Conf.			Overall
Team	W	L	T	W		L		T
Iowa State Normal		–		6	–	0	–	0
Notre Dame		–		7	–	0	–	1
Michigan Agricultural		–		8	–	1	–	0
Carthage		–		6	–	1	–	0
Michigan		–		6	–	1	–	0
Western State Normal		–		6	–	1	–	0
Mount Union		–		8	–	2	–	0
Lake Forest		–		5	–	1	–	1
Haskell		–		7	–	2	–	0
Detroit College		–		3	–	1	–	2
Butler		–		5	–	3	–	0
Central Michigan		–		4	–	3	–	0
St. Mary's (OH)		–		4	–	3	–	0
Cincinnati		–		4	–	3	–	1
Doane		–		3	–	2	–	3
Buchtel		–		4	–	4	–	0
Rose Poly		–		4	–	4	–	0
Marquette		–		2	–	2	–	1
North Dakota Agricultural		–		2	–	2	–	1
Wabash		–		3	–	4	–	1
Miami (OH)		–		3	–	4	–	0
Ohio		–		2	–	4	–	2
Saint Louis		–		3	–	5	–	0
Michigan State Normal		–		2	–	4	–	0
Western Illinois		–		1	–	2	–	0
Fairmount		–		2	–	5	–	1
Northern Illinois State		–		2	–	6	–	0
South Dakota State		–		1	–	3	–	0
Heidelberg		–		0	–	7	–	2

The 1909 Western State Normal Hilltoppers football team was an American football team that represented Western State Normal School (later renamed Western Michigan University) as an independent during the 1909 college football season. In their third season under head coach William H. Spaulding (who later went on to coach at Minnesota and UCLA), the Hilltoppers compiled a 6–1 record. Tackle John McGuiness was the team captain.

The fall of 1909 was the sixth fall term in the school's history. By early October 1909, the school had an enrollment of more than 550 students. Dwight B. Waldo was the school's president.

On November 27, 1909, the school held a dinner in honor of the football team. Coach Spaulding was the toastmaster, and President Waldo spoke about "The Event," referring to the football team's victory over Kalamazoo College. The women of the sewing and cooking departments were in charge of the event, including decorations and planning, preparing, and serving the meal.

== Schedule ==
Date	Time	Opponent	Site	Result	Source
October 2		at Otsego High School	Otsego, MI	W 61–0	
October 9		at Albion	Albion, MI	L 6–10	
October 16		at Battle Creek High School	Battle Creek, MI	W 15–0	
October 23		Dowagiac High School	Woodward Avenue grounds; Kalamazoo, MI	W 47–0	
October 29	3:30 p.m.	Benton Harbor College	Woodward Avenue grounds; Kalamazoo, MI	W 28–3	
November 13	2:15 p.m.	Kalamazoo	Woodward Avenue grounds; Kalamazoo, MI	W 26–5	
November 19		at Central Michigan	Mount Pleasant, MI (rivalry)	W 11–0	
