= 1909 Miami Redskins football team =

American college football season

1909 Miami Redskins football
- Conference: Independent
- Record: 3–4
- Head coach: Harold Iddings (1st season)
- Home stadium: Miami Field

1909 Midwestern college football independents records
	Conf.			Overall
Team	W	L	T	W		L		T
Iowa State Normal		–		6	–	0	–	0
Notre Dame		–		7	–	0	–	1
Michigan Agricultural		–		8	–	1	–	0
Carthage		–		6	–	1	–	0
Michigan		–		6	–	1	–	0
Western State Normal		–		6	–	1	–	0
Mount Union		–		8	–	2	–	0
Lake Forest		–		5	–	1	–	1
Haskell		–		7	–	2	–	0
Detroit College		–		3	–	1	–	2
Butler		–		5	–	3	–	0
Central Michigan		–		4	–	3	–	0
St. Mary's (OH)		–		4	–	3	–	0
Cincinnati		–		4	–	3	–	1
Doane		–		3	–	2	–	3
Buchtel		–		4	–	4	–	0
Rose Poly		–		4	–	4	–	0
Marquette		–		2	–	2	–	1
North Dakota Agricultural		–		2	–	2	–	1
Wabash		–		3	–	4	–	1
Miami (OH)		–		3	–	4	–	0
Ohio		–		2	–	4	–	2
Saint Louis		–		3	–	5	–	0
Michigan State Normal		–		2	–	4	–	0
Western Illinois		–		1	–	2	–	0
Fairmount		–		2	–	5	–	1
Northern Illinois State		–		2	–	6	–	0
South Dakota State		–		1	–	3	–	0
Heidelberg		–		0	–	7	–	2

The 1909 Miami Redskins football team was an American football team that represented Miami University as an independent during the 1909 college football season. In head coach Harold Iddings' first year, the Redskins compiled a 3–4 record and outscored their opponents 96 to 83.

== Schedule ==
Date	Time	Opponent	Site	Result	Source
October 2		Wilmington (OH)	Miami Field; Oxford, OH	W 35–2	
October 9		at Western Reserve	Cleveland, OH	L 0–3	
October 16		Ohio	Miami Field; Miami, OH (rivalry)	W 45–0	
October 23		Marietta	Miami Field; Miami, OH	W 10–0	
November 6		at Saint Louis	League Park; St. Louis, MO	L 0–22	
November 13		at Notre Dame	Cartier Field; Notre Dame, IN	L 0–46	
November 25	10:30 a.m.	at Cincinnati	League Park; Cincinnati, OH (Victory Bell)	L 6–10	
