= 1909 Buchtel football team =

American college football season

1909 Buchtel football
- Conference: Independent
- Record: 4–4
- Head coach: Clarence Weed (1st season)
- Captain: John Thomas
- Home stadium: League Park

1909 Midwestern college football independents records
	Conf.			Overall
Team	W	L	T	W		L		T
Iowa State Normal		–		6	–	0	–	0
Notre Dame		–		7	–	0	–	1
Michigan Agricultural		–		8	–	1	–	0
Carthage		–		6	–	1	–	0
Michigan		–		6	–	1	–	0
Western State Normal		–		6	–	1	–	0
Mount Union		–		8	–	2	–	0
Lake Forest		–		5	–	1	–	1
Haskell		–		7	–	2	–	0
Detroit College		–		3	–	1	–	2
Butler		–		5	–	3	–	0
Central Michigan		–		4	–	3	–	0
St. Mary's (OH)		–		4	–	3	–	0
Cincinnati		–		4	–	3	–	1
Doane		–		3	–	2	–	3
Buchtel		–		4	–	4	–	0
Rose Poly		–		4	–	4	–	0
Marquette		–		2	–	2	–	1
North Dakota Agricultural		–		2	–	2	–	1
Wabash		–		3	–	4	–	1
Miami (OH)		–		3	–	4	–	0
Ohio		–		2	–	4	–	2
Saint Louis		–		3	–	5	–	0
Michigan State Normal		–		2	–	4	–	0
Western Illinois		–		1	–	2	–	0
Fairmount		–		2	–	5	–	1
Northern Illinois State		–		2	–	6	–	0
South Dakota State		–		1	–	3	–	0
Heidelberg		–		0	–	7	–	2

The 1909 Buchtel football team represented Buchtel College in the 1909 college football season. The team was led by first-year head coach Clarence Weed, in his only season. Buchtel was outscored by their opponents by a total of 54–69.

== Schedule ==
Date	Time	Opponent	Site	Result
October 2		Western Reserve	League Park; Akron, OH	L 0–24
October 9		at Mount Union	Alliance, OH	L 0–24
October 16		at Allegheny	Athletic Park; Meadville, PA	W 5–0
October 23	3:15 p.m.	Hiram	League Park; Akron, OH	W 11–0
October 30		Mount Union	League Park; Akron, OH	L 0–11
November 6		at Findlay	Findlay, OH	W 6–0
November 17		at Hiram	Hiram, OH	L 8–10
November 25	10:00 a.m.	Bethany (WV)	League Park; Akron, OH	W 24–0
