= Robert Wood (coach) =

American football coach and politician (1887–1949)

Biographical details
- Born: 1887; Athens, Ohio, U.S.
- Died: April 20, 1949 (aged 61–62); Columbus, Ohio, U.S.

Playing career
- 1906: Ohio

Coaching career (HC unless noted)
- 1909–1910: Ohio
- 1920–1921: Ohio (assistant)

Head coaching record
- Overall: 2–10–3

Robert Simpson Wood (1887 – April 20, 1949) was an American college football coach and mayor of Athens, Ohio. He served as the head football coach at his alma mater, Ohio University, from 1909 to 1910, compiling a record of 2–10–3. He later served as the mayor of Athens from 1930 to 1931.

Wood died on April 20, 1949, at his sister-in-law's home in Columbus, Ohio.

== Head coaching record ==
Year	Team	Overall	Conference	Standing	Bowl/playoffs
Ohio Green and White (Independent) (1909–1910)
1909	Ohio	2–4–2			
1910	Ohio	0–6–1			
Ohio:		2–10–3			
Total:		2–10–3			
