= 1909 Marquette Blue and Gold football team =

American college football season

1909 Marquette Blue and Gold football
- Conference: Independent
- Record: 2–2–1
- Head coach: William Juneau (2nd season)

1909 Midwestern college football independents records
	Conf.			Overall
Team	W	L	T	W		L		T
Iowa State Normal		–		6	–	0	–	0
Notre Dame		–		7	–	0	–	1
Michigan Agricultural		–		8	–	1	–	0
Carthage		–		6	–	1	–	0
Michigan		–		6	–	1	–	0
Western State Normal		–		6	–	1	–	0
Mount Union		–		8	–	2	–	0
Lake Forest		–		5	–	1	–	1
Haskell		–		7	–	2	–	0
Detroit College		–		3	–	1	–	2
Butler		–		5	–	3	–	0
Central Michigan		–		4	–	3	–	0
St. Mary's (OH)		–		4	–	3	–	0
Cincinnati		–		4	–	3	–	1
Doane		–		3	–	2	–	3
Buchtel		–		4	–	4	–	0
Rose Poly		–		4	–	4	–	0
Marquette		–		2	–	2	–	1
North Dakota Agricultural		–		2	–	2	–	1
Wabash		–		3	–	4	–	1
Miami (OH)		–		3	–	4	–	0
Ohio		–		2	–	4	–	2
Saint Louis		–		3	–	5	–	0
Michigan State Normal		–		2	–	4	–	0
Western Illinois		–		1	–	2	–	0
Fairmount		–		2	–	5	–	1
Northern Illinois State		–		2	–	6	–	0
South Dakota State		–		1	–	3	–	0
Heidelberg		–		0	–	7	–	2

The 1909 Marquette Blue and Gold football team was an American football team that represented Marquette University as an independent during the 1909 college football season. Under head coach William Juneau, Marquette compiled a 2–2–1 record and outscored its opponents, 38 to 16. Marquette's most notable contest occurred on November 25 against undefeated Notre Dame, who was hailed as undisputed champion of the west after their defeat of Michigan three weeks prior.

== Schedule ==
Date	Opponent	Site	Result	Source
October 9	Monmouth (IL)	Milwaukee, WI	W 17–0	
October 16	Saint John's (MN)	Milwaukee, WI	W 16–0	
October 23	Michigan	Milwaukee, WI	L 5–6	
November 13	at Michigan Agricultural	College Field; East Lansing, MI	L 0–10	
November 25	Notre Dame	Milwaukee, WI	T 0–0	
