= 1909 Wabash Little Giants football team =

American college football season

1909 Wabash Little Giants football
- Conference: Independent
- Record: 3–4–1
- Head coach: Jesse Harper (1st season)

1909 Midwestern college football independents records
	Conf.			Overall
Team	W	L	T	W		L		T
Iowa State Normal		–		6	–	0	–	0
Notre Dame		–		7	–	0	–	1
Michigan Agricultural		–		8	–	1	–	0
Carthage		–		6	–	1	–	0
Michigan		–		6	–	1	–	0
Western State Normal		–		6	–	1	–	0
Mount Union		–		8	–	2	–	0
Lake Forest		–		5	–	1	–	1
Haskell		–		7	–	2	–	0
Detroit College		–		3	–	1	–	2
Butler		–		5	–	3	–	0
Central Michigan		–		4	–	3	–	0
St. Mary's (OH)		–		4	–	3	–	0
Cincinnati		–		4	–	3	–	1
Doane		–		3	–	2	–	3
Buchtel		–		4	–	4	–	0
Rose Poly		–		4	–	4	–	0
Marquette		–		2	–	2	–	1
North Dakota Agricultural		–		2	–	2	–	1
Wabash		–		3	–	4	–	1
Miami (OH)		–		3	–	4	–	0
Ohio		–		2	–	4	–	2
Saint Louis		–		3	–	5	–	0
Michigan State Normal		–		2	–	4	–	0
Western Illinois		–		1	–	2	–	0
Fairmount		–		2	–	5	–	1
Northern Illinois State		–		2	–	6	–	0
South Dakota State		–		1	–	3	–	0
Heidelberg		–		0	–	7	–	2

The 1909 Wabash Little Giants football team represented Wabash College as an independent during the 1909 college football season. Led by first-year head coach Jesse Harper, the Little Giants compiled a record of 3–4–1 against a schedule that included Michigan Agricultural, Purdue, and Notre Dame.

== Schedule ==
Date	Opponent	Site	Result	Source
October 2	Illinois State Normal	Ingalls Field; Crawfordsville, IN	W 27–0	
October 9	at DePauw	Greencastle, IN	T 0–0	
October 16	at Michigan Agricultural	College Field; East Lansing, MI	L 0–28	
October 23	at Saint Louis	League Park; St. Louis, MO	L 0–14	
October 30	Hanover	Ingalls Field; Crawfordsville, IN	W 48–0	
November 6	at Purdue	Stuart Field; West Lafayette, IN	W 18–17	
November 20	at Notre Dame	Cartier Field; Notre Dame, IN	L 0–38	
November 25	at Butler	Indianapolis, IN	L 0–12	
