= 1909 Michigan Agricultural Aggies football team =

American college football season

1909 Michigan Agricultural Aggies football
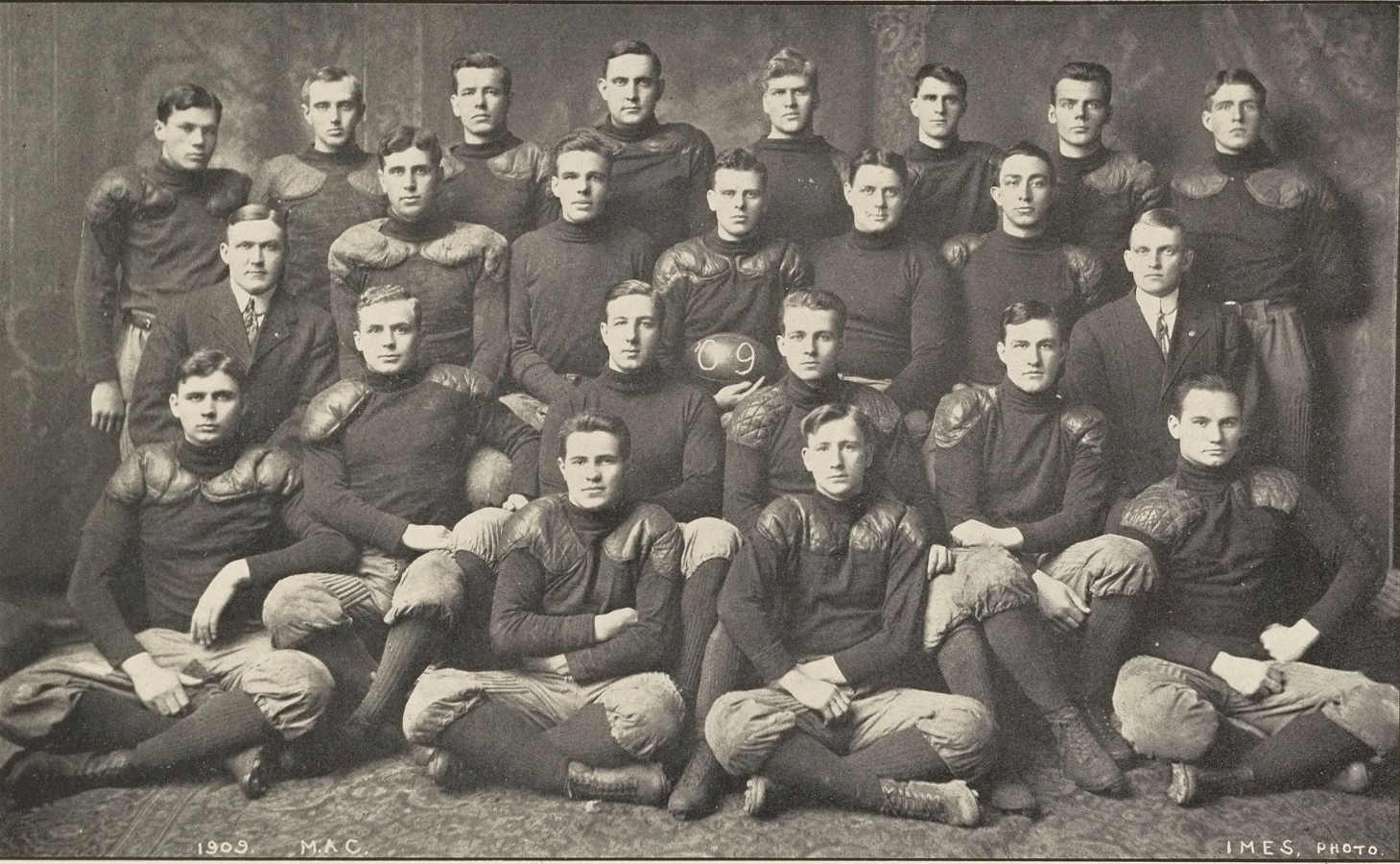
- Conference: Independent
- Record: 8–1
- Head coach: Chester Brewer (7th season)
- Captain: Parnell G. McKenna
- Home stadium: College Field

1909 Midwestern college football independents records
	Conf.			Overall
Team	W	L	T	W		L		T
Iowa State Normal		–		6	–	0	–	0
Notre Dame		–		7	–	0	–	1
Michigan Agricultural		–		8	–	1	–	0
Carthage		–		6	–	1	–	0
Michigan		–		6	–	1	–	0
Western State Normal		–		6	–	1	–	0
Mount Union		–		8	–	2	–	0
Lake Forest		–		5	–	1	–	1
Haskell		–		7	–	2	–	0
Detroit College		–		3	–	1	–	2
Butler		–		5	–	3	–	0
Central Michigan		–		4	–	3	–	0
St. Mary's (OH)		–		4	–	3	–	0
Cincinnati		–		4	–	3	–	1
Doane		–		3	–	2	–	3
Buchtel		–		4	–	4	–	0
Rose Poly		–		4	–	4	–	0
Marquette		–		2	–	2	–	1
North Dakota Agricultural		–		2	–	2	–	1
Wabash		–		3	–	4	–	1
Miami (OH)		–		3	–	4	–	0
Ohio		–		2	–	4	–	2
Saint Louis		–		3	–	5	–	0
Michigan State Normal		–		2	–	4	–	0
Western Illinois		–		1	–	2	–	0
Fairmount		–		2	–	5	–	1
Northern Illinois State		–		2	–	6	–	0
South Dakota State		–		1	–	3	–	0
Heidelberg		–		0	–	7	–	2

The 1909 Michigan Agricultural Aggies football team represented Michigan Agricultural College (MAC) as an independent during the 1909 college football season. In their seventh year under head coach Chester Brewer, the Aggies compiled an 8–1 record, shut out eight opponents, and outscored their opponents by a combined total of 291 to 17.

== Schedule ==
Date	Opponent	Site	Result	Source
October 7	Detroit College	College Field; East Lansing, MI	W 27–0	
October 9	Alma	College Field; East Lansing, MI	W 34–0	
October 16	Wabash	College Field; East Lansing, MI	W 28–0	
October 23	at Notre Dame	Cartier Field; Notre Dame, IN (rivalry)	L 0–17	
October 30	at Culver	Culver, IN	W 29–0	
November 6	DePaul	College Field; East Lansing, MI	W 51–0	
November 10	Marquette	College Field; East Lansing, MI	W 10–0	
November 13	Olivet	College Field; East Lansing, MI	W 20–0	
November 25	at Detroit Athletic Club	Detroit Athletic Club grounds; Detroit, MI, MI	W 34–0	
