= 1909 Haskell Indians football team =

American college football season

1909 Haskell Indians football
- Conference: Independent
- Record: 7–2
- Head coach: John R. Bender (2nd season)

1909 Midwestern college football independents records
	Conf.			Overall
Team	W	L	T	W		L		T
Iowa State Normal		–		6	–	0	–	0
Notre Dame		–		7	–	0	–	1
Michigan Agricultural		–		8	–	1	–	0
Carthage		–		6	–	1	–	0
Michigan		–		6	–	1	–	0
Western State Normal		–		6	–	1	–	0
Mount Union		–		8	–	2	–	0
Lake Forest		–		5	–	1	–	1
Haskell		–		7	–	2	–	0
Detroit College		–		3	–	1	–	2
Butler		–		5	–	3	–	0
Central Michigan		–		4	–	3	–	0
St. Mary's (OH)		–		4	–	3	–	0
Cincinnati		–		4	–	3	–	1
Doane		–		3	–	2	–	3
Buchtel		–		4	–	4	–	0
Rose Poly		–		4	–	4	–	0
Marquette		–		2	–	2	–	1
North Dakota Agricultural		–		2	–	2	–	1
Wabash		–		3	–	4	–	1
Miami (OH)		–		3	–	4	–	0
Ohio		–		2	–	4	–	2
Saint Louis		–		3	–	5	–	0
Michigan State Normal		–		2	–	4	–	0
Western Illinois		–		1	–	2	–	0
Fairmount		–		2	–	5	–	1
Northern Illinois State		–		2	–	6	–	0
South Dakota State		–		1	–	3	–	0
Heidelberg		–		0	–	7	–	2

The 1909 Haskell Indians football team was an American football team that represented the Haskell Indian Institute (now known as Haskell Indian Nations University) as an independent during the 1909 college football season. In its second and final season under head coach John R. Bender, Haskell compiled a 7–2 record and outscored opponents by a total of 142 to 73. Its victories included games against Texas (12–11) and Nebraska (16–5); its losses were to Baylor (0–12) and Texas A&M (0–15).

== Schedule ==
Date	Opponent	Site	Result	Attendance	Source
September 25	Independence A.C.	Lawrence, KS	W 26–0		
October 2	Chilocco	Lawrence, KS	W 50–0		
October 8	at Barnes University	Sportsman's Park; St. Louis, MO	W 17–5		
October 16	vs. Texas	Gaston Park; Dallas, TX	W 12–11		
October 20	at Baylor	Carroll Field; Waco, TX	L 0–12	500	
October 23	at Texas A&M	College Station, TX	L 0–15		
October 30	at Missouri Mines	St. Joseph, MO	W 13–10		
November 13	at Denver	Denver, CO	W 8–5		
November 25	at Nebraska	Nebraska Field; Lincoln, NE	W 16–5		
