= 1909 North Dakota Agricultural Aggies football team =

American college football season

1909 North Dakota Agricultural Aggies football
- Conference: Independent
- Record: 2–2–1
- Head coach: Arthur Rueber (1st season)
- Captain: Bert Haskins

1909 Midwestern college football independents records
	Conf.			Overall
Team	W	L	T	W		L		T
Iowa State Normal		–		6	–	0	–	0
Notre Dame		–		7	–	0	–	1
Michigan Agricultural		–		8	–	1	–	0
Carthage		–		6	–	1	–	0
Michigan		–		6	–	1	–	0
Western State Normal		–		6	–	1	–	0
Mount Union		–		8	–	2	–	0
Lake Forest		–		5	–	1	–	1
Haskell		–		7	–	2	–	0
Detroit College		–		3	–	1	–	2
Butler		–		5	–	3	–	0
Central Michigan		–		4	–	3	–	0
St. Mary's (OH)		–		4	–	3	–	0
Cincinnati		–		4	–	3	–	1
Doane		–		3	–	2	–	3
Buchtel		–		4	–	4	–	0
Rose Poly		–		4	–	4	–	0
Marquette		–		2	–	2	–	1
North Dakota Agricultural		–		2	–	2	–	1
Wabash		–		3	–	4	–	1
Miami (OH)		–		3	–	4	–	0
Ohio		–		2	–	4	–	2
Saint Louis		–		3	–	5	–	0
Michigan State Normal		–		2	–	4	–	0
Western Illinois		–		1	–	2	–	0
Fairmount		–		2	–	5	–	1
Northern Illinois State		–		2	–	6	–	0
South Dakota State		–		1	–	3	–	0
Heidelberg		–		0	–	7	–	2

The 1909 North Dakota Agricultural Aggies football team was an American football team that represented North Dakota Agricultural College (now known as North Dakota State University) as an independent during the 1909 college football season. In their first year under head coach Arthur Rueber, the team compiled a 2–2–1 record.

== Schedule ==
Date	Opponent	Site	Result	Source
October 9	at Valley City State	Valley City, ND	W 12–3	
October 16	Wahpeton	Fargo, ND	L 11–16	
October 22	at South Dakota State	Brookings, SD (rivalry)	W 11–5	
October 30	Fargo	Fargo, ND	L 0–11	
November 6	St. Thomas (MN)	Fargo, ND	T 5–5	
