= 1909 Northern Illinois State Normal football team =

American college football season

1909 Northern Illinois State Normal football
- Conference: Independent
- Record: 2–6
- Head coach: Nelson A. Kellogg (4th season)
- Home stadium: Glidden Field

1909 Midwestern college football independents records
	Conf.			Overall
Team	W	L	T	W		L		T
Iowa State Normal		–		6	–	0	–	0
Notre Dame		–		7	–	0	–	1
Michigan Agricultural		–		8	–	1	–	0
Carthage		–		6	–	1	–	0
Michigan		–		6	–	1	–	0
Western State Normal		–		6	–	1	–	0
Mount Union		–		8	–	2	–	0
Lake Forest		–		5	–	1	–	1
Haskell		–		7	–	2	–	0
Detroit College		–		3	–	1	–	2
Butler		–		5	–	3	–	0
Central Michigan		–		4	–	3	–	0
St. Mary's (OH)		–		4	–	3	–	0
Cincinnati		–		4	–	3	–	1
Doane		–		3	–	2	–	3
Buchtel		–		4	–	4	–	0
Rose Poly		–		4	–	4	–	0
Marquette		–		2	–	2	–	1
North Dakota Agricultural		–		2	–	2	–	1
Wabash		–		3	–	4	–	1
Miami (OH)		–		3	–	4	–	0
Ohio		–		2	–	4	–	2
Saint Louis		–		3	–	5	–	0
Michigan State Normal		–		2	–	4	–	0
Western Illinois		–		1	–	2	–	0
Fairmount		–		2	–	5	–	1
Northern Illinois State		–		2	–	6	–	0
South Dakota State		–		1	–	3	–	0
Heidelberg		–		0	–	7	–	2

The 1909 Northern Illinois State Normal football team represented Northern Illinois State Normal College as an independent in the 1909 college football season. They were led by fourth-year head coach Nelson A. Kellogg and played their home games at Glidden Field, located on the east end of campus. The team finished the season with a 2–6 record.

== Schedule ==
Date	Opponent	Site	Result	Source
September 25	DeKalb All-Stars	Glidden Field; DeKalb, IL	L 0–25	
October 9	Alumni	Glidden Field; DeKalb, IL	L 13–21	
October 16	at Elgin High School	Elgin, IL	L 0–26	
October 23	at East Aurora High School	Aurora, IL	L 5–11	
November 6	at Oregon High School	Oregon, IL	W 6–0	
November 10	Dixon	Glidden Field; DeKalb, IL	W 35–0	
November 13	at German Theological Seminary	Dubuque, IA	L 6–34	
November 20	Sterling High School	Glidden Field; DeKalb, IL	L 11–30	
