= 1909 Ohio Green and White football team =

American college football season

1909 Ohio Green and White football
- Conference: Independent
- Record: 2–4–2
- Head coach: Robert Wood (1st season)

1909 Midwestern college football independents records
	Conf.			Overall
Team	W	L	T	W		L		T
Iowa State Normal		–		6	–	0	–	0
Notre Dame		–		7	–	0	–	1
Michigan Agricultural		–		8	–	1	–	0
Carthage		–		6	–	1	–	0
Michigan		–		6	–	1	–	0
Western State Normal		–		6	–	1	–	0
Mount Union		–		8	–	2	–	0
Lake Forest		–		5	–	1	–	1
Haskell		–		7	–	2	–	0
Detroit College		–		3	–	1	–	2
Butler		–		5	–	3	–	0
Central Michigan		–		4	–	3	–	0
St. Mary's (OH)		–		4	–	3	–	0
Cincinnati		–		4	–	3	–	1
Doane		–		3	–	2	–	3
Buchtel		–		4	–	4	–	0
Rose Poly		–		4	–	4	–	0
Marquette		–		2	–	2	–	1
North Dakota Agricultural		–		2	–	2	–	1
Wabash		–		3	–	4	–	1
Miami (OH)		–		3	–	4	–	0
Ohio		–		2	–	4	–	2
Saint Louis		–		3	–	5	–	0
Michigan State Normal		–		2	–	4	–	0
Western Illinois		–		1	–	2	–	0
Fairmount		–		2	–	5	–	1
Northern Illinois State		–		2	–	6	–	0
South Dakota State		–		1	–	3	–	0
Heidelberg		–		0	–	7	–	2

The 1909 Ohio Green and White football team represented Ohio University as an independent during the 1909 college football season. Led by first-year head coach Robert Wood, the Green and White compiled a record of 2–4–2.

== Schedule ==
Date	Opponent	Site	Result	Source
	West Virginia Wesleyan		L 0–11	
October 9	Otterbein	Athens, OH	L 3–18	
October 16	Miami (OH)	Miami Field; Oxford, OH (rivalry)	L 0–45	
October 23	Ohio Northern	Athens, OH	T 0–0	
October 30	Wilmington (OH)	Athens, OH	W 17–3	
November 6	Muskingum	Athens, OH	W 6–0	
November 13	at Ohio Northern	Ada, Ohio	L 0–29	
November 25	Heidelberg	Athens, OH	T 0–0	
