= 1909 Michigan State Normal Normalites football team =

American college football season

1909 Michigan State Normal Normalites football
- Conference: Independent
- Record: 1–5
- Head coach: Clare Hunter (1st season)
- Captain: Allen F. Sherzer

1909 Midwestern college football independents records
	Conf.			Overall
Team	W	L	T	W		L		T
Iowa State Normal		–		6	–	0	–	0
Notre Dame		–		7	–	0	–	1
Michigan Agricultural		–		8	–	1	–	0
Carthage		–		6	–	1	–	0
Michigan		–		6	–	1	–	0
Western State Normal		–		6	–	1	–	0
Mount Union		–		8	–	2	–	0
Lake Forest		–		5	–	1	–	1
Haskell		–		7	–	2	–	0
Detroit College		–		3	–	1	–	2
Butler		–		5	–	3	–	0
Central Michigan		–		4	–	3	–	0
St. Mary's (OH)		–		4	–	3	–	0
Cincinnati		–		4	–	3	–	1
Doane		–		3	–	2	–	3
Buchtel		–		4	–	4	–	0
Rose Poly		–		4	–	4	–	0
Marquette		–		2	–	2	–	1
North Dakota Agricultural		–		2	–	2	–	1
Wabash		–		3	–	4	–	1
Miami (OH)		–		3	–	4	–	0
Ohio		–		2	–	4	–	2
Saint Louis		–		3	–	5	–	0
Michigan State Normal		–		2	–	4	–	0
Western Illinois		–		1	–	2	–	0
Fairmount		–		2	–	5	–	1
Northern Illinois State		–		2	–	6	–	0
South Dakota State		–		1	–	3	–	0
Heidelberg		–		0	–	7	–	2

The 1909 Michigan State Normal Normalites football team was an American football team that represented Michigan State Normal College (later renamed Eastern Michigan University) as an independent during the 1909 college football season. In their first and only season under head coach Clare Hunter, the Normalites compiled a 1–5 record and were outscored by a total of 56 to 33. Allen F. Sherzer was the team captain.

== Schedule ==
Date	Opponent	Site	Result	Source
October 16	at Alma	Alma, MI	L 0–5	
October 23	Cleary	Ypsilanti, MI	L 0–19	
October 30	Adrian	Ypsilanti, MI	L 2–6	
November 5	Central Michigan	Ypsilanti, MI (rivalry)	W 17–0	
November 13	at Detroit College	Detroit Athletic Club; Detroit, MI	L 8–9	
November 20	at Hillsdale	Hillsdale, MI	L 6–17	
