= Billy Wasmund =

American football player and coach (1887–1911)

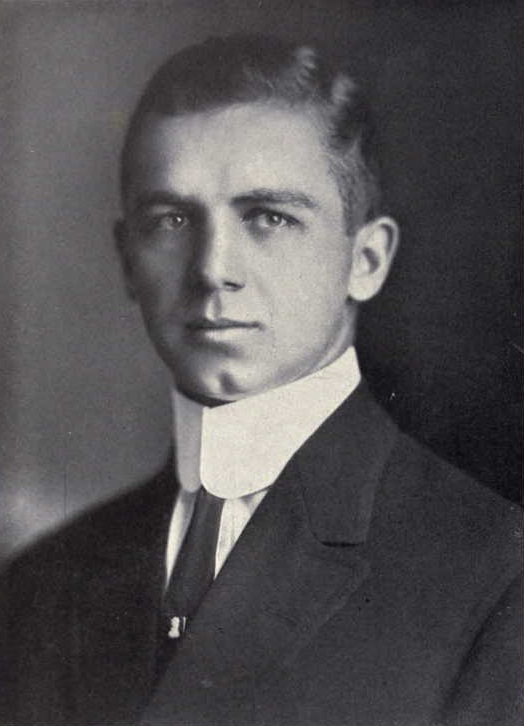

Biographical details
- Born: December 1887; Michigan, U.S.
- Died: October 4, 1911 (aged 23); Austin, Texas, U.S.

Playing career
- 1907–1909: Michigan
- Position: Quarterback

Coaching career (HC unless noted)
- 1910: Texas

Head coaching record
- Overall: 6–2

William Stephen Wasmund (December 1887 – October 4, 1911) was an American football player and coach.

Wasmund was born in December 1887 in Michigan. His father, Lebrecht Wasmund, was a stone contractor born in Germany. Wasmund attended Lafayette College where he played fullback for the school's college football team for two years. Wasmund's play at Lafayette attracted the attention of Fielding H. Yost of the University of Michigan. Wasmund transferred to Michigan where Yost developed him into a quarterback. Wasmund was the Wolverines' starting quarterback for three years, from 1907 to 1909.

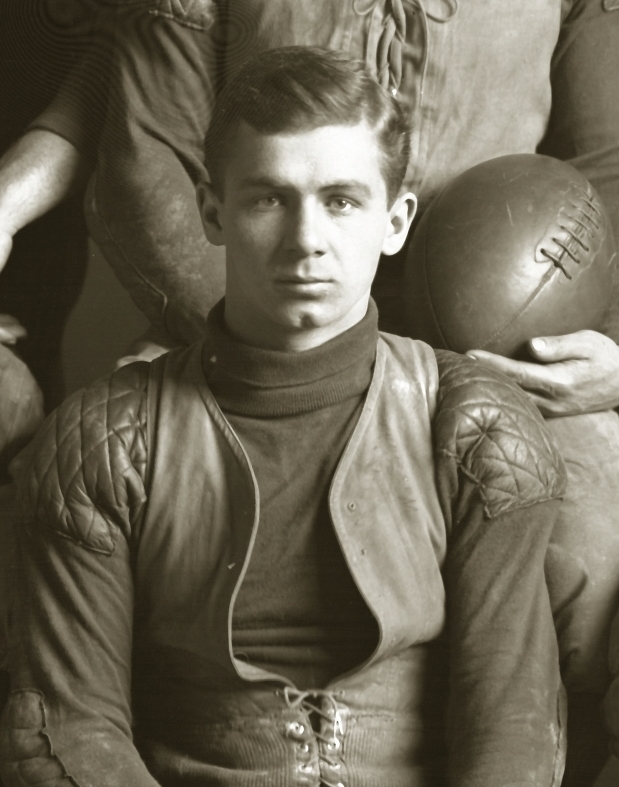
Wasmund at Michigan

In 1910, the University of Texas asked Yost to recommend a coach for the Texas varsity football team, and Wasmund was hired on Yost's recommendation. Wasmund led the Longhorns to a 6–2 record in 1910, and he was rehired to return as head coach in 1911. On October 1, 1911, six days before the opening game of the 1911 season, Wasmund fell from the second-story window of the apartment where he was living near the University of Texas campus. Wasmund was rendered unconscious by the fall and received bruises to his hands, arms and hips, a deep gash on the forehead and deep cuts on both legs. He regained consciousness Sunday afternoon, but died three days after his fall. Wasmund was known to be a somnambulist, and it is thought that he walked through the window while sleep-walking. Death resulted from a rupture of the bladder and peritonitis. Wasmund was 23 years old at the time of his death.

== Head coaching record ==
Year	Team	Overall	Conference	Standing	Bowl/playoffs
Texas Longhorns (Independent) (1910)
1910	Texas	6–2			
Texas:		6–2			
Total:		6–2			
