= Heze Clark =

American football player and coach (1882–1956)

Biographical details
- Born: July 22, 1882; Port Austin, Michigan, U.S.
- Died: August 31, 1956 (aged 74); Indianapolis, Indiana, U.S.

Playing career

Football
- 1904–1906: Indiana
- Position: Halfback

Coaching career (HC unless noted)

Football
- 1908–1911: Rose Polytechnic
- 1923–1927: Rose Polytechnic

Basketball
- 1923–1927: Rose Polytechnic

Administrative career (AD unless noted)
- 1909–1911: Rose Polytechnic
- 1916: Great Lakes Navy
- 1923: Rose Polytechnic

Head coaching record
- Overall: 25–46–2 (football); 24–47 (basketball)

Accomplishments and honors

Awards
- 1906 All-Western

Hezlep W. "Heze" Clark (July 22, 1882 – August 31, 1956) was an American college football player and coach. He served two stints as the head football coach at Rose-Hulman Institute of Technology (then known as Rose Polytechnic Institute), from 1908 to 1911 and later from 1923 to 1927.
