= James K. Watkins =

American attorney and police commissioner (1887–1970)

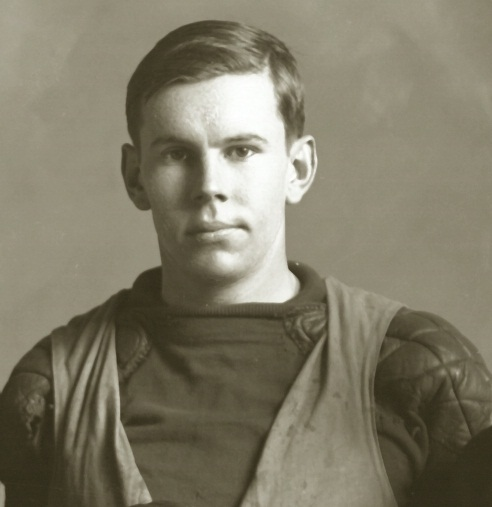
- James K. Watkins, 1907
- Born: May 24, 1887; Michigan
- Died: February 1970 (aged 82); Grosse Pointe, Michigan
- Citizenship: United States
- Education: University of Michigan
- Known for: Attorney, Police Commissioner

James Keir Watkins (May 24, 1887 – February 1970) was an American attorney and police commissioner. He played college football for the University of Michigan from 1905 to 1909. He later became a leading attorney in Detroit and served as commissioner of the Detroit Police Department in the early 1930s. He also organized the Detroit branch of "The Volunteers" in 1936 "to save their country from a perpetuation of the New Deal."

== Early years ==
Watkins was born in 1887. He was the son of the Rev. Amos Watkins of the Trinity Episcopal Church in Bay City, Michigan. He attended Ann Arbor High School and next enrolled at the University of Michigan. He played at the tackle, fullback and center positions for the Michigan Wolverines football team from 1905 to 1909. He won a Rhodes Scholarship to study at the University of Oxford in 1909. Watkins later received a law degree from Detroit College of Law and began practicing law in Detroit. He also regularly returned to Ann Arbor to serve as an assistant coach to the football team under head coach Fielding H. Yost. During World War I, he served in the U.S. Army and attended the first training camp at Fort Sheridan. After the war, he became "one of Detroit's most respected attorneys."

== Detroit Police Commissioner ==
In January 1931, Detroit Mayor Frank Murphy appointed Watkins as the commissioner of police. Watkins had never held public office. He knew nothing about police work, but reportedly brought "character, courage, and good judgment" to the job. The Journal of the American Judicature Society wrote that Watkins developed a police force "unequaled in any other large city." Shortly after his appointment, the federal government took over two established Detroit banks, the Guardian National Bank of Commerce and the First National Bank, and established a new National Bank of Detroit. On the night after the creation of the new bank, Watkins went on the radio "to accuse the government of having 'played into the hand of the Wall Streeters.'" After Watkins radio talk, over 10,000 telegrams were sent to Washington. Watkins tenure as police commissioner was a time of street protests and labor unrest. In November 1931, the Communist candidate for mayor and the Unemployed Councils conducted a large demonstration in downtown Detroit. When police used clubs and tear gas to move the demonstrators away from City Hall, Watkins came under criticism. Watkins again was the subject of press attention after he sent a contingent of Detroit police officers to support the Dearborn police during the March 1932 Ford Hunger March, in which four workers were shot to death. Watkins explained that, upon learning that a riot was taking place, he dispatched his officers to the scene, but noted that the trouble was "pretty much over" by the time the Detroit officers arrived.

== Later years ==
In September 1936, Watkins, by then the former police commissioner, organized a Detroit unit of an organization called The Volunteers "to provide citizens of Michigan with an opportunity to save their country from a perpetuation of the New Deal." Watkins organization received support from Senator Arthur Vandenberg. Watkins explained, "Any one interested in the Landon-Knox movement, no matter what his party affiliations, but who is an American citizen who wants to see the American form of constitutional government continued is invited to join The Volunteers."

Watkins also served as president of the Detroit community fund, a coordinating agency for the city's charities, which raised $2 million per year.

== Bibliography ==
- Fine, Sidney Frank Murphy: The Detroit Years, University of Michigan Press, 1975 ISBN 0472329499
