= Philip Bartelme =

American athletic director (1876–1954)

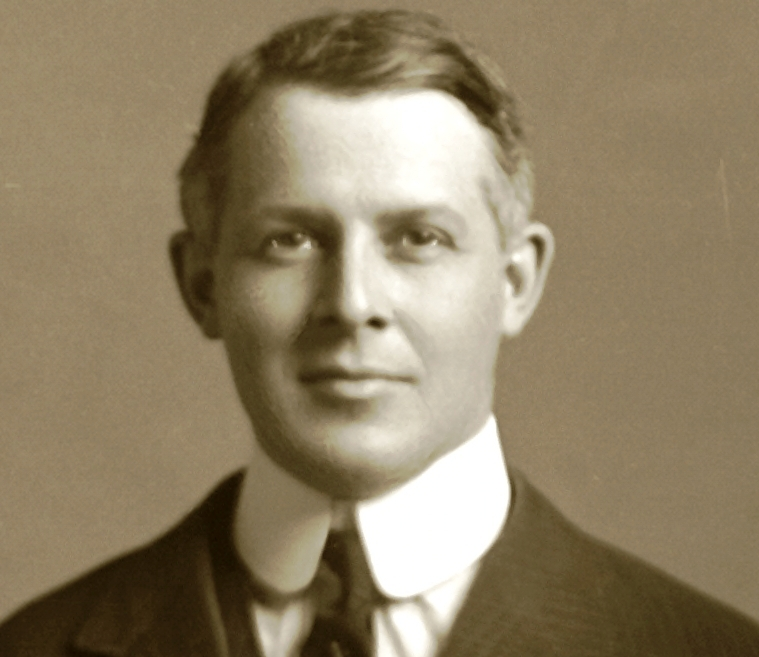
- Bartelme cropped from the 1909 Michigan football team photograph
- Born: August 16, 1876; Chicago, Illinois, U.S.
- Died: May 3, 1954 (aged 77); Carmel, California, U.S.
- Education: University of Michigan
- Occupation: Athletic director
- Known for: Second athletic director at the University of Michigan, 1909-1921

Philip George Bartelme (August 16, 1876 – May 3, 1954), also known as P.G. Bartelme and sometimes spelled "Barthelme", was the second athletic director of the University of Michigan, holding the position from 1909 to 1921. Bartelme is credited with bringing the sports of basketball, hockey, and swimming to varsity status at Michigan and leading Michigan back into the Big Ten Conference after its withdrawal in 1907. The only athletic directors to serve a longer tenure at Michigan are Fielding H. Yost (1921-1940), Fritz Crisler (1941-1968), and Don Canham (1968-1988). After leaving Michigan in 1921, Bartelme spent the rest of his career in the world of professional baseball, serving as the president of the Syracuse Stars (1922-1925), the head of the St. Louis Cardinals' farm system in the 1930s, president of the Sacramento Solons (1936-1944), and a scout for the Brooklyn Dodgers. Bartelme's baseball career was closely tied to that of Branch Rickey, who Bartelme had hired as Michigan's baseball coach in 1910.

== University of Michigan ==
A native of Chicago, Illinois, Bartelme was a student manager for the 1902 Michigan Wolverines football team. On November 1, 1902, Michigan played Wisconsin at Marshall Field in Chicago before a crowd of 23,000. The stadium became so densely packed that one of the temporary grandstands hastily erected to support 400 people collapsed, injuring several. The game was stopped for ten minutes while the order was restored, and Bartelme immediately gave the order that no more tickets should be sold. Thousands were turned away.

Bartelme became Michigan's second athletic director in 1909 following the resignation of Charles A. Baird. He was appointed to the position on March 24, 1909, by the university's Board of Regents at a salary of $2,700 per year. He took over the position on July 1, 1909.

When Bartelme took over as athletic director, Michigan had withdrawn from the Western Conference. One of his accomplishments was Michigan's return to the conference. In September 1909, Barthelme made his views known:

"I always thought that Michigan's place is in the conference, and moreover, I have thought that when conditions were so we could return, it would be the only thing for us to do. However, I am not so sure that that time has come."

He noted that the "training table" was the biggest obstacle to Michigan's rejoining the conference. Bartelme said the training table was "a great factor in getting the men into the condition necessary for hard football" and avoiding serious injuries.

Bartelme is credited with bringing the sports of basketball, hockey, and swimming to varsity status at Michigan He also oversaw the construction of the Athletic Administration Building and hired the university's first full-time director of intramural sports.

In 1921, Bartelme led an investigation to determine whether Vernon Parks, the captain of Michigan's baseball team and leading pitcher in the Big Ten Conference, had played baseball for Portland in the Pacific Coast League under the assumed name, Harold Brooks. Barthelme noted, "This Brooks won 90 percent of his games I am told. I have seen his picture and I am certain he is really Vernon Parks, our star pitcher. If the charges are true, there is no doubt that the University of Michigan will take drastic action." Parks admitted to Bartelme that he had played for Portland and at the same time resigned from the Michigan team.

== Career in baseball ==
=== Relationship with Branch Rickey ===
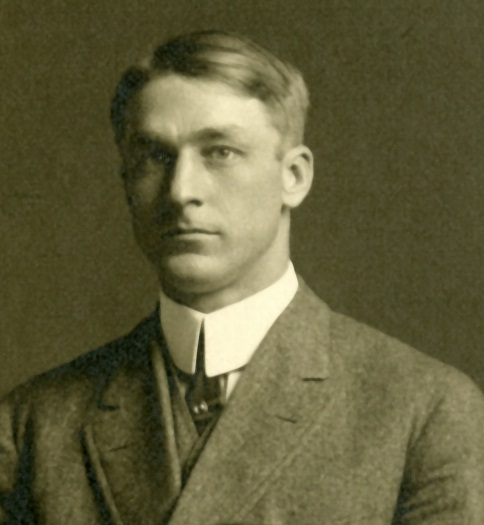
Branch Rickey in 1912

While serving as athletic director, Bartelme was responsible for giving Branch Rickey his start in baseball administration. Michigan's baseball coach quit in 1910, and Rickey, a law student at Michigan then, applied for the job. Rickey asked every alumnus he had ever met to write letters to Bartelme on his behalf. Bartelme recalled, "Day after day those letters came in." Bartelme was reportedly impressed with Rickey's passion for baseball and his idealism about the proper role of athletics on a college campus. Bartelme convinced the law school dean that Rickey could handle his law studies and serve as the school's baseball coach. Bartelme reportedly called Rickey into his office to tell him he had the job if only "to put a stop to those damn letters that come in every day." The hiring also marked the beginning of a lifelong friendship and business relationship between Rickey and Bartelme. Bartelme and Rickey worked together for most of the next 35 years, and in 1944 a California newspaper noted: "He and Rickey have had a close association in baseball ever since Bartelme was head of the athletic department of the University of Michigan where Rickey took to baseball just as a means to build up his failing health."

=== Syracuse Stars ===
In 1922, Bartelme purchased a one-half interest in the Syracuse Stars baseball club of the International League. John Conway Toole, president of the league, said at the time, "Mr. Bartelme was a high-type sportsman and would be a valuable addition to the league." Bartelme joined his friend Branch Rickey as a partner in ownership of the Stars. In late 1923, Bartelme and Rickey proposed moving the Syracuse team to Montreal. However, the Stars remained in Syracuse with Bartelme acting as the club's president from 1922-1925.

Bartelme sold his interest in the Stars in January 1926. At the time of the sale, the Syracuse Herald praised Bartelme for his contributions to Syracuse baseball:

"Bartelme worked hand in hand with the Cardinals club during his three and a half years here and gave Syracuse the best baseball it has ever enjoyed."

Among Bartelme's most profitable moves was his selling of slugger Jim Bottomley to the St. Louis Cardinals for $30,000. The Stars had acquired Bottomley for $1,000, and he quickly became a sensation while playing for the Stars.

=== Brick tile business in Florida ===
Upon selling his interest in the Syracuse Stars, Bartleme went into business with a manufacturing concern in St. Augustine, Florida. Bartelme invested considerable money in a firm constructing hollow brick tile for the building business in Florida. With Florida experiencing a building boom in 1926, Bartelme reported that he felt that his entire time must be devoted to his new business.

=== St. Louis Cardinals ===
In March 1928, Bartelme and Branch Rickey purchased the Dayton baseball franchise in the new Central League, and Bartelme became the club's president. According to Rickey's biography, Bartelme was set back by "business losses in Florida" and was brought to St. Louis by Rickey as an office administrator.

By 1929, press accounts identified Bartelme as assistant to Rickey for minor league relations. Bartelme continued to serve as vice president in charge of the Cardinals' minor league operations during Rickey's time in St. Louis. In December 1935, press accounts refer him as the head of the Cardinals' chain of baseball farm teams.

During Bartelme's tenure, the Cardinals' farm system produced the stars who would form the core of the Gashouse Gang teams of the 1930s, including Pepper Martin, Dizzy Dean, and Joe Medwick—players who were integral parts of the 1934 Cardinals team that won the World Series. The farm system operated by Rickey and Bartelme was so successful that Commissioner of Baseball Kenesaw Mountain Landis twice released over 70 of the Cardinals' minor league players. Nevertheless, Rickey and Bartelme's farm system remained, and similar systems were adopted by every major league team within a few years.

=== Sacramento Solons ===
When the Cardinals purchased the Sacramento Solons of the Pacific Coast League in December 1935, Bartelme was sent to California to take over as the club president. Bartelme was president of the Solons from January 1936 until February 1944, when the Cardinals pulled out of their interest in the Sacramento club. The Oakland Tribune noted that Bartelme was "one of the finest men in baseball and is well-liked in Sacramento." The Tribune's sports editor, Lee Dunbar, referred to Bartelme as "one of my favorite people."

=== Brooklyn Dodgers ===
After the Cardinals sold the Solons, Bartelme was again hired by his old friend, Branch Rickey, who had then taken over as president of the Brooklyn Dodgers. Bartelme remained in Sacramento and became a scout for the Dodgers in California.

== Family and death ==
Bartelme died on May 3, 1954, in Carmel, California, at age 75. He was survived by his wife, Mina Chase Bartelme.
