= List of Miami RedHawks football seasons =

The Miami RedHawks college football team compete as part of the National Collegiate Athletic Association (NCAA) Division I Football Bowl Subdivision, representing the Miami University in the Eastern Division of the Mid-American Conference (MAC). Miami has played their home games at Yager Stadium in Oxford, Ohio since 1983.

Miami has 23 conference championships with 12 postseason bowl game appearances and 7 bowl game victories. The RedHawks have also had 13 undefeated seasons, a longest winning streak of 14 games between 2003 and 2004 and a home winning streak of 14 games between 1973 and 1975, and also between 1980 and 1982.

Football was introduced to the university in 1888. The first win in the history of the program came the following year, a 44–0 shutout over Dayton High School on November 9, 1889. From 1888 to 1910, Miami competed as a football independent, before they joined the Ohio Athletic Conference (OAC) in 1911. From 1911 to 1927, Miami saw some success as they had only three losing seasons and four conference championships. In 1928, Miami left the OAC and became a charter member of the Buckeye Conference. As a member of the Buckeye Conference, Miami won conference championships in 1932, 1933, and 1936. In 1939 the conference dissolved and Miami competed independently again.

By 1948 Miami joined the MAC, where it remains today. Miami won the first MAC title in its inaugural year. Miami leads the MAC with 16 conference titles.

== Seasons ==
National champions †	Conference champions *	Division champions ‡	Bowl game berth ^

Season (Note: Miami did not field teams for the 1890 season.)	Head coach	Conference	Conference finish	Division finish (Note: The MAC introduced divisional play in 1997; the divisional winners advance to the MAC Championship Game to determine the conference champion.)	Wins	Losses	Ties	Bowl result	AP Poll (Note: The Associated Press began conducting a weekly college football poll in 1936.)	Coaches' Poll (Note: The college football coaches' poll has been sponsored by multiple organizations since its creation in 1950. Its current sponsor is USA Today)
1888	(no paid coach)	Independent	–	–	0	0	1		–	–
1889	(no paid coach)	Independent	–	–	4	0	0		–	–
1891	(no paid coach)	Independent	–	–	1	1	0		–	–
1892	(no paid coach)	Independent	–	–	2	2	0		–	–
1893	(no paid coach)	Independent	–	–	3	0	0		–	–
1894	(no paid coach)	Independent	–	–	1	2	0		–	–
1895	C. K. Fauver	Independent	–	–	3	0	0		–	–
1896	Ernest Merrell	Independent	–	–	3	1	0		–	–
1897	Herbert J. McIntire	Independent	–	–	2	4	1		–	–
1898	(no paid coach)	Independent	–	–	0	2	0		–	–
1899	(no paid coach)	Independent	–	–	1	5	0		–	–
1900	Alonzo Edwin Branch	Independent	–	–	0	2	0		–	–
1901	Thomas Hazzard	Independent	–	–	1	3	1		–	–
1902	Peter McPherson	Independent	–	–	5	2	1		–	–
1903	Peter McPherson	Independent	–	–	1	4	0		–	–
1904	Arthur Smith	Independent	–	–	1	5	0		–	–
1905	(no paid coach)	Independent	–	–	4	3	0		–	–
1906	Arthur H. Parmelee	Independent	–	–	1	5	1		–	–
1907	Amos Foster	Independent	–	–	6	1	0		–	–
1908	Amos Foster	Independent	–	–	7	0	0		–	–
1909	Harold Iddings	Independent	–	–	3	4	0		–	–
1910	Harold Iddings	Independent	–	–	2	4	1		–	–
1911	Edwin Sweetland	Ohio Athletic Conference	9th	–	2	4	2		–	–
1912	James C. Donnelly	Ohio Athletic Conference	T-5th	–	3	3	2		–	–
1913	James C. Donnelly	Ohio Athletic Conference	4th	–	6	2	0		–	–
1914	James C. Donnelly	Ohio Athletic Conference	T-3rd	–	5	3	0		–	–
1915	Chester J. Roberts	Ohio Athletic Conference	2nd	–	6	2	0		–	–
1916 *	George Little	Ohio Athletic Conference	1st *	–	7	0	1		–	–
1917 *	George Rider	Ohio Athletic Conference	1st *	–	6	0	2		–	–
1918 * (Note: Miami claims a conference title for 1918, but the OAC lists Wittenburg as the conference campion.)	George Rider	Ohio Athletic Conference	1st * (Note: The OAC lists Miami as finishing 2nd for the 1918 season)	–	5	0	1		–	–
1919	George Little	Ohio Athletic Conference	4th	–	7	1	0		–	–
1920	George Little	Ohio Athletic Conference	8th	–	5	2	1		–	–
1921 *	George Little	Ohio Athletic Conference	1st *	–	8	0	0		–	–
1922	Harry W. Ewing	Ohio Athletic Conference	T-9th	–	4	3	1		–	–
1923	Harry W. Ewing	Ohio Athletic Conference	16th	–	3	4	1		–	–
1924	Chester Pittser	Ohio Athletic Conference	19th	–	2	6	0		–	–
1925	Chester Pittser	Ohio Athletic Conference	T-8th	–	5	3	0		–	–
1926	Chester Pittser	Ohio Athletic Conference	T-8th	–	5	2	1		–	–
1927 *	Chester Pittser	Ohio Athletic Conference	T-1st *	–	8	1	0		–	–
1928	Chester Pittser	Buckeye Conference		–	6	2	0		–	–
1929	Chester Pittser	Buckeye Conference		–	7	2	0		–	–
1930	Chester Pittser	Buckeye Conference		–	4	4	1		–	–
1931	Chester Pittser	Buckeye Conference		–	4	5	0		–	–
1932 *	Frank Wilton	Buckeye Conference	1st *	–	7	1	0		–	–
1933 *	Frank Wilton	Buckeye Conference	T-1st *	–	7	2	0		–	–
1934	Frank Wilton	Buckeye Conference		–	5	4	0		–	–
1935	Frank Wilton	Buckeye Conference		–	5	3	1		–	–
1936' *	Frank Wilton	Buckeye Conference	T-1st *	–	7	1	1		–	–
1937	Frank Wilton	Buckeye Conference		–	4	4	1			–
1938	Frank Wilton	Buckeye Conference		–	6	3	0			–
1939	Frank Wilton	Independent	–	–	1	7	1			–
1940	Frank Wilton	Independent	–	–	0	7	1			–
1941	Frank Wilton	Independent	–	–	2	7	0			–
1942	Stu Holcomb	Independent	–	–	3	6	0			–
1943	Stu Holcomb	Independent	–	–	7	2	1			–
1944	Sid Gillman	Independent	–	–	8	1	0			–
1945	Sid Gillman	Independent	–	–	7	2	0			–
1946	Sid Gillman	Independent	–	–	7	3	0			–
1947 ^	Sid Gillman	Independent	–	–	9	0	1	W Sun ^		–
1948 *	George "Blackie" Blackburn	MAC	1st *	–	7	1	1			–
1949	Woody Hayes	MAC	2nd	–	5	4	0			–
1950 *^	Woody Hayes	MAC	1st *	–	9	1	0	W Salad ^		
1951	Ara Parseghian	MAC	2nd	–	7	3	0			
1952	Ara Parseghian	MAC	2nd	–	8	1	0			
1953	Ara Parseghian	MAC	2nd	–	7	1	1			
1954 *	Ara Parseghian	MAC	1st *	–	8	1	0			
1955 *	Ara Parseghian	MAC	1st *	–	9	0	0			
1956	John Pont	MAC	2nd	–	7	1	1			
1957 *	John Pont	MAC	1st *	–	6	3	0			
1958 *	John Pont	MAC	1st *	–	6	3	0			
1959	John Pont	MAC	3rd	–	5	4	0			
1960	John Pont	MAC	4th	–	5	5	0			
1961	John Pont	MAC	3rd	–	6	4	0			
1962 ^	John Pont	MAC	3rd	–	8	2	1	L Tangerine ^		
1963	Bo Schembechler	MAC	2nd	–	5	3	2			
1964	Bo Schembechler	MAC	T-2nd	–	6	3	1			
1965 *	Bo Schembechler	MAC	T-1st *	–	7	3	0			
1966 *	Bo Schembechler	MAC	T-1st *	–	9	1	0			
1967	Bo Schembechler	MAC	T-3rd	–	6	4	0			
1968	Bo Schembechler	MAC	2nd	–	7	3	0			
1969	Bill Mallory	MAC	T-3rd	–	7	3	0			
1970	Bill Mallory	MAC	T-2nd	–	7	3	0			
1971	Bill Mallory	MAC	T-3rd	–	7	3	0			
1972	Bill Mallory	MAC	T-4th	–	7	3	0			
1973 *^	Bill Mallory	MAC	1st *	–	11	0	0	W Tangerine ^	15	17
1974 *^	Dick Crum	MAC	1st *	–	10	0	1	W Tangerine ^	10	10
1975 *^	Dick Crum	MAC	1st *	–	11	1	0	W Tangerine ^	12	16
1976	Dick Crum	MAC	7th	–	3	8	0			
1977 *	Dick Crum	MAC	1st *	–	10	1	0			
1978	Tom Reed	MAC	3rd	–	8	2	1			
1979	Tom Reed	MAC	7th	–	6	5	0			
1980	Tom Reed	MAC	T-3rd	–	5	6	0			
1981	Tom Reed	MAC	2nd	–	8	2	1			
1982	Tom Reed	MAC	3rd	–	7	4	0			
1983	Tim Rose	MAC	7th	–	4	7	0			
1984	Tim Rose	MAC	T-6th	–	4	7	0			
1985	Tim Rose	MAC	2nd	–	8	2	1			
1986 *^	Tim Rose	MAC	1st *	–	8	4	0	L California ^		
1987	Tim Rose	MAC	T-2nd	–	5	6	0			
1988	Tim Rose	MAC	9th	–	0	10	1			
1989	Tim Rose	MAC	7th	–	2	8	1			
1990	Randy Walker	MAC	5th	–	5	5	1			
1991	Randy Walker	MAC	T-3rd	–	6	4	1			
1992	Randy Walker	MAC	T-3rd	–	6	4	1			
1993	Randy Walker	MAC	9th	–	4	7	0			
1994 (Note: Miami finished the 1994 season with an overall record of 5–5–1, but the NCAA later awarded a forfeit win over Michigan State University for using an ineligible player.)	Randy Walker	MAC	T-3rd	–	6 (5)	4 (5)	1			
1995	Randy Walker	MAC	2nd	–	8	2	1			
1996	Randy Walker	MAC	T-2nd	–	6	5	0			
1997	Randy Walker	MAC		T-2nd (East)	8	3	–			
1998 ‡	Randy Walker	MAC		T-1st (East) ‡	10	1	–			
1999	Terry Hoeppner	MAC		2nd (East)	7	4	–			
2000	Terry Hoeppner	MAC		T-3rd (East)	6	5	–			
2001	Terry Hoeppner	MAC		T-2nd (East)	7	5	–			
2002	Terry Hoeppner	MAC		3rd (East)	7	5	–			
2003 *‡^	Terry Hoeppner	MAC	1st *	1st (East) ‡	13	1	–	W GMAC ^	10	12
2004 ‡^	Terry Hoeppner	MAC	2nd	1st (East) ‡	8	5	–	L Independence ^		
2005 ‡	Shane Montgomery	MAC		T-1st (East) ‡	7	4	–			
2006	Shane Montgomery	MAC		5th (East)	2	10	–			
2007 ‡	Shane Montgomery	MAC		T-1st (East) ‡	6	7	–			
2008	Shane Montgomery	MAC		7th (East)	2	10	–			
2009	Michael Haywood	MAC		7th (East)	1	11	–			
2010 *‡^	Michael Haywood/Lance Guidry (Interim)	MAC	1st *	1st (East) ‡	10	4	–	W GoDaddy.com ^		
2011	Don Treadwell	MAC		T-4th (East)	4	8	–			
2012	Don Treadwell	MAC		T-4th (East)	4	8	–			
2013	Don Treadwell/Mike Bath (Interim)	MAC		7th (East)	0	12	–			
2014	Chuck Martin	MAC		6th (East)	2	10	–			
2015	Chuck Martin	MAC		T-5th (East)	3	9	–			
2016 ‡^	Chuck Martin	MAC		T-1st (East) ‡	6	7	–	L St. Petersburg ^		
2017	Chuck Martin	MAC		2nd (East)	5	7	–			
2018	Chuck Martin	MAC		T-2nd (East)	6	6	–			
2019 *‡^	Chuck Martin	MAC	1st *	1st (East) ‡	8	6	–	L LendingTree ^		
2020	Chuck Martin	MAC		3rd (East)	2	1	–			
2021 ^	Chuck Martin	MAC		2nd (East)	7	6	–	W Frisco Football Classic ^		
2022 ^	Chuck Martin	MAC		T-4th (East)	6	7	–	L Bahamas Bowl ^		
2023 *‡^	Chuck Martin	MAC	1st *	1st (East) ‡	11	2	–	L Cure Bowl ^		
2024 ^	Chuck Martin	MAC	T-1st	–	9	5	–	W Arizona Bowl ^		
2025 ^	Chuck Martin	MAC	T-2nd	–	7	7	–	L Arizona Bowl ^		

== Totals ==
1888–2025 totals through December 28, 2025 (after Arizona Bowl)

	Games	Wins	Losses	Ties	Win percentage
Regular season games	1,255	727	484	44	.596
Conference games	528	329	189	10	.633
Conference Championship games	8	4	4	0	.500
Bowl games	16	9	8	0	.529
All games	1,280	740	496	44	.595

Records above take into account a 1994 retroactively awarded forfeit win over Michigan State. Miami's on-field record is 739-497-44.
