= List of Miami RedHawks head football coaches =

The Miami RedHawks football program is a college football team that represents Miami University in the Mid-American Conference (MAC) in the National Collegiate Athletic Association. The team has had 35 head coaches and 2 interim coaches since it started playing organized football in 1888 and was originally known by the nickname Redskins before changing to RedHawks in 1997. Miami competed independent of conferences at various point in its history, but also held memberships in the Ohio Athletic Conference (1911 − 1927), and Buckeye Conference (1928 − 1938) before joining the MAC in 1947. The RedHawks have played in 1,197 games during their 130 seasons. Nine coaches have led the RedHawks to postseason bowl games: Sid Gillman, Woody Hayes, John Pont, Bill Mallory, Dick Crum, Tim Rose, Terry Hoeppner, Michael Haywood, and Chuck Martin. Fifteen coaches have won conference championships with the RedHawks: three for the OAC, one for the Buckeye, and eleven for the MAC . No Miami coach has led the RedHawks to a national championship. As of the end of the 2019 season, Randy Walker is the all-time leader in games coached (99) and wins (59), while Frank Wilton is the all-time leader years coached (10). C. K. Fauver leads the RedHawks in winning percentage with a perfect 1.000 in his one season at Miami. Among coaches with more than two seasons of tenure, George Little has the highest winning percentage, .875, and Don Treadwell has the lowest winning percentage, with a record of 8–21 (.276) in roughly 2 1/2 seasons.

Of the 35 RedHawks coaches, five have been inducted into the College Football Hall of Fame: Little, Gillman, Hayes, Ara Parseghian, and Bo Schembechler. These men and the number of high-caliber player coaches the school has produced gave rise to its nickname as a "Cradle of Coaches". No coach has received National Coach of the Year honors. On December 3, 2013, Miami hired Martin, who remains the current head coach as of December 2019.

== Key ==
General
#	Number of coaches (Note: A running total of the number of coaches of the RedHawks. Thus, any coach who has two or more separate terms as head coach is counted only once.)
DCs	Conference division championships (Note: Miami did not compete in a conference division until the MAC subdivided in 1997.)
CCs	Conference championships (Note: Miami did not join a conference until 1911.)
†	Elected to the College Football Hall of Fame

Overall
GC	Games coached
OW	Wins
OL	Losses
OT	Ties (Note: Overtime rules in college football were introduced in 1996, making ties impossible in the period since.)
O%	Winning percentage (Note: When computing the win–loss percentage, a tie counts as half a win and half a loss.)

Conference
CW	Wins
CL	Losses
CT	Ties
C%	Winning percentage

Post-season
PW	Wins
PL	Losses
PT	Ties
P%	Winning percentage

== Coaches ==
Statistics correct as of 1/1/2026

#	Name	Term	GC	OW	OL	OT	O%	CW	CL	CT	C%	PW	PL	PT	DCs	CCs	Awards
—	No paid coach	1888-1894*; 1898-99, 1905	32	16	15	1	.516	—	—	—	—	—	—	—	—	—	
1	C. K. Fauver	1895	3	3	0	0	1.000	—	—	—	—	—	—	—	—	—	
2	Ernest Merrell	1896	4	3	1	0	.750	—	—	—	—	—	—	—	—	—	
3	Herbert McIntire	1897	7	2	4	1	.357	—	—	—	—	—	—	—	—	—	
4	Alonzo Branch	1900	2	0	2	0	.000	—	—	—	—	—	—	—	—	—	
5	Thomas Hazzard	1901	5	1	3	1	.300	—	—	—	—	—	—	—	—	—	
6	Peter McPherson	1902-03	13	6	6	1	.500	—	—	—	—	—	—	—	—	—	
7	Arthur Smith	1904	6	1	5	0	.167	—	—	—	—	—	—	—	—	—	
8	Arthur Parmalee	1906	7	1	5	1	.214	—	—	—	—	—	—	—	—	—	
9	Amos Foster	1907-08	14	13	1	0	.929	—	—	—	—	—	—	—	—	—	
10	Harold Iddings	1909-10	14	5	8	1	.393	—	—	—	—	—	—	—	—	—	
11	Edwin Sweetland	1911	8	2	4	2	.375	1	3	1	0.300	—	—	—	—		
12	James Donnelly	1912-14	24	14	8	2	.625	9	5	2	0.625	—	—	—	—		
13	C. J. Roberts	1915	8	6	2	0	.750	5	1	0	0.833				—		
14	George Little^{†}	1916, 1919-21	32	27	3	2	.875	23	3	2	0.857				—	2	
15	George Rider	1917-18	14	11	0	3	.893	9	0	2	0.909				—	1	
16	Harry Ewing	1922-23	16	7	7	2	.500	5	7	1	0.423				—		
17	Chester Pittser	1924-31	68	41	25	2	.618	23	21	1	0.522				—	1	
18	Frank Wilton	1932-41	88	44	39	5	.528	20	13	2	0.600				—	3	
19	Stu Holcomb	1942-43	19	10	8	1	.553	—	—	—	—				—	—	
20	Sid Gillman^{†}	1944-47	38	31	6	1	.829	—	—	—	—	1	0	0	—	—	
21	George Blackburn	1948	9	7	1	1	.833	4	0	0	1.000				—	1	
22	Woody Hayes^{†}	1949-50	19	14	5	0	.737	7	1	0	0.875	1	0	0	—	1	
23	Ara Parseghian^{†}	1951-55	46	39	6	1	.859	19	2	1	0.886				—	2	
24	John Pont	1956-62	67	43	22	2	.657	25	8	2	0.743	0	1	0	—	2	
25	Bo Schembechler^{†}	1963-68	60	40	17	3	.692	27	8	1	0.764				—	2	
26	Bill Mallory	1969-73	51	39	12	0	.765	15	11	0	0.577	1	0	0	—	1	MAC Coach of the Year (1973)
27	Dick Crum	1974-77	45	34	10	1	.767	18	4	0	0.818	2	0	0	—	3	MAC Coach of the Year (1974)
28	Tom Reed	1978-82	55	34	19	2	.636	23	13	1	0.635				—		
29	Tim Rose	1983-89	78	31	44	3	.417	26	28	3	0.482	0	1	0	—	1	
30	Randy Walker	1990-98	99	59	35	5	.621	46	24	3	0.651				1		
31	Terry Hoeppner	1999-04	73	48	25	—	.658	37	11	—	0.771	1	1	—	2	1	MAC Coach of the Year (2003)
32	Shane Montgomery	2005-08	48	17	31	—	.354	12	18	—	0.400				2		
33	Michael Haywood	2009-10	25	10	15	—	.400	8	8	—	0.500				1	1	MAC Coach of the Year (2010)
33 Interim	Lance Guidry	2010	1	1	0	—	—	—	—	—	—	1	0	—	—	—	
34	Don Treadwell	2011-13	29	8	21	—	.276	6	11	—	0.353						
34 Interim	Mike Bath	2013	7	0	7	—	.000	0	7	—	.000						
35	Chuck Martin	2014–present	146	72	74	—	.493	57	34	—	0.626	2	4	—	4	2	
