= 1904 Notre Dame football team =

American college football season

1904 Notre Dame football
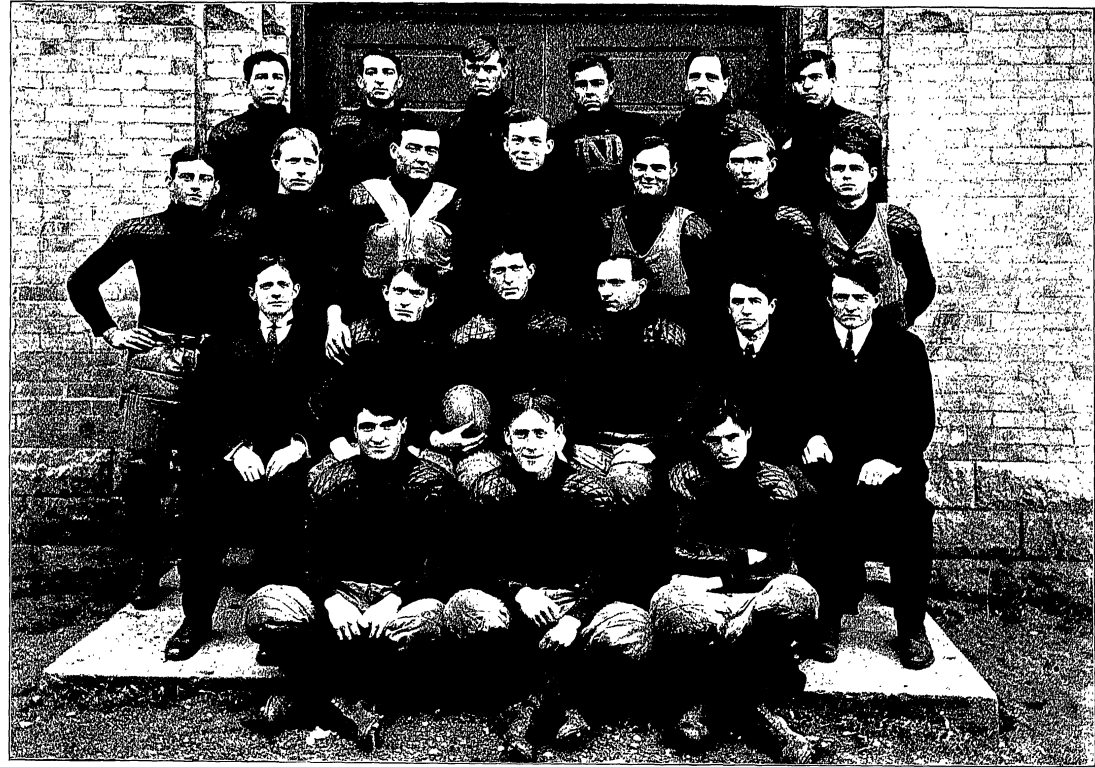
- Conference: Independent
- Record: 5–3 ({{{conf_record}}} Independent)
- Head coach: Louis J. Salmon (1st season)
- Captain: Frank Shaughnessy
- Home stadium: Cartier Field

1904 Midwestern college football independents records
	Conf.			Overall
Team	W	L	T	W		L		T
Saint Louis		–		10	–	0	–	0
Bethany (KS)		–		7	–	0	–	0
Northern Illinois State		–		5	–	0	–	0
Cape Girardeau Normal		–		2	–	0	–	0
Haskell		–		8	–	1	–	0
Cincinnati		–		7	–	1	–	0
Butler		–		6	–	1	–	0
Doane		–		5	–	1	–	0
Kansas		–		8	–	1	–	1
DePauw		–		8	–	2	–	0
Iowa State		–		7	–	2	–	0
Ohio Northern		–		7	–	2	–	1
Michigan State Normal		–		6	–	2	–	0
Wittenberg		–		6	–	2	–	0
Marquette		–		5	–	2	–	0
Nebraska		–		7	–	3	–	0
Detroit College		–		4	–	2	–	0
South Dakota State		–		4	–	2	–	1
Notre Dame		–		5	–	3	–	0
Iowa State Normal		–		5	–	3	–	1
Western Illinois		–		6	–	4	–	0
Heidelberg		–		6	–	4	–	1
Drake		–		5	–	4	–	0
Carthage		–		0	–	0	–	2
North Dakota Agricultural		–		3	–	3	–	0
Wabash		–		4	–	4	–	0
Fairmount		–		4	–	5	–	0
Lake Forest		–		3	–	5	–	1
Ohio Medical		–		2	–	4	–	2
Washington University		–		4	–	7	–	0
Ohio		–		2	–	4	–	1
Missouri		–		3	–	6	–	0
Mount Union		–		2	–	6	–	0
Miami (OH)		–		1	–	5	–	0
Kansas State		–		1	–	6	–	0
American Medical		–		0	–	3	–	0

The 1904 Notre Dame football team was an American football team that represented the University of Notre Dame as an independent during the 1904 college football season. In its first and only season under head coach Louis J. Salmon, the team compiled a 5–3 record and was outscored by opponents by a total of 127 to 94. In three games against major opponents, the team lost to Wisconsin, Kansas, and Purdue by a total of 118 to 5.

The team played its home games at Cartier Field in Notre Dame, Indiana.

== Schedule ==
Date	Opponent	Site	Result	Source
October 1	Wabash	Cartier Field; Notre Dame, IN	W 12–4	
October 8	American Medical	Cartier Field; Notre Dame, IN	W 44–0	
October 15	vs. Wisconsin	Milwaukee, WI	L 0–58	
October 22	at Ohio Medical	Neil Park; Columbus, OH	W 17–5	
October 27	Toledo Athletic Association	Cartier Field; Notre Dame, IN	W 6–0	
November 5	at Kansas	McCook Field; Lawrence, KS	L 5–24	
November 19	DePauw	Cartier Field; Notre Dame, IN	W 10–0	
November 24	at Purdue	Stuart Field; West Lafayette, IN (rivalry)	L 0–36	

== Personnel ==
=== Players ===
- Patrick A. Beacon, left guard
- Robert Bracken, halfback
- Durant Church, halfback
- Richard Coad, sub quarterback
- Richard W. Donovan, right guard
- William A. Draper, fullback
- Michael L. Fansler, end and fullback
- Arthur Funk, right tackle
- David J. Guthrie, halfback
- Thomas F. Healy, left tackle
- Lawrence McNerny, left end
- Daniel L. Murphy, tackle
- Frank Shaughnessy, captain and right end
- Clarence J. Sheehan, center
- Nate H. Silver, quarterback
- Rufus W. Waldorf, halfback
