= 1904 Cincinnati football team =

American college football season

1904 Cincinnati football
- Conference: Independent
- Record: 7–1
- Head coach: Amos Foster (1st season)
- Captain: Alfred McCray
- Home stadium: Burnet Woods, League Park

1904 Midwestern college football independents records
	Conf.			Overall
Team	W	L	T	W		L		T
Saint Louis		–		10	–	0	–	0
Bethany (KS)		–		7	–	0	–	0
Northern Illinois State		–		5	–	0	–	0
Cape Girardeau Normal		–		2	–	0	–	0
Haskell		–		8	–	1	–	0
Cincinnati		–		7	–	1	–	0
Butler		–		6	–	1	–	0
Doane		–		5	–	1	–	0
Kansas		–		8	–	1	–	1
DePauw		–		8	–	2	–	0
Iowa State		–		7	–	2	–	0
Ohio Northern		–		7	–	2	–	1
Michigan State Normal		–		6	–	2	–	0
Wittenberg		–		6	–	2	–	0
Marquette		–		5	–	2	–	0
Nebraska		–		7	–	3	–	0
Detroit College		–		4	–	2	–	0
South Dakota State		–		4	–	2	–	1
Notre Dame		–		5	–	3	–	0
Iowa State Normal		–		5	–	3	–	1
Western Illinois		–		6	–	4	–	0
Heidelberg		–		6	–	4	–	1
Drake		–		5	–	4	–	0
Carthage		–		0	–	0	–	2
North Dakota Agricultural		–		3	–	3	–	0
Wabash		–		4	–	4	–	0
Fairmount		–		4	–	5	–	0
Lake Forest		–		3	–	5	–	1
Ohio Medical		–		2	–	4	–	2
Washington University		–		4	–	7	–	0
Ohio		–		2	–	4	–	1
Missouri		–		3	–	6	–	0
Mount Union		–		2	–	6	–	0
Miami (OH)		–		1	–	5	–	0
Kansas State		–		1	–	6	–	0
American Medical		–		0	–	3	–	0

The 1904 Cincinnati football team was an American football team that represented the University of Cincinnati as an independent during the 1904 college football season. Led by first-year head coach Amos Foster, Cincinnati compiled a record of 7–1. Alfred McCray was the team captain. The team played home games at Burnet Woods and League Park in Cincinnati.

== Schedule ==
Date	Time	Opponent	Site	Result	Attendance	Source
October 1	2:30 p.m.	Georgetown (KY)	Burnet Woods; Cincinnati, OH	W 33–0		
October 8		at Wittenberg	Zimmerman Field; Springield, OH	W 29–4	2,000	
October 15		Miami (OH)	League Park; Cincinnati, OH (Victory Bell)	W 46–0	1,400	
October 22		Kentucky State College	League Park; Cincinnati, OH	W 11–0		
October 29		at Ohio Medical	Neil Park; Columbus, OH	W 11–0		
November 5		Stumps	League Park; Cincinnati, OH	L 0–6		
November 16		Tennessee	League Park; Cincinnati, OH	W 35–0		
November 24	11:10 a.m.	Kenyon	League Park; Cincinnati, OH	W 17–0		
