= Sherman Landers =

American track and field athlete

Sherman G. Landers
- Landers circa 1918 wearing Chicago Athletic Association jersey, with bamboo vaulting pole

Personal information
- Born: March 24, 1898 Oregon, Illinois, U.S.
- Died: May 31, 1994 (aged 96) Springfield Township, Pennsylvania, U.S.
- Education: University of Pennsylvania; Wharton School of Finance (1920)
- Occupation: Advertising Executive
- Height: 178 cm (5 ft 10 in)
- Weight: 64 kg (141 lb)
- Spouses: Marian C. Ludden (June, 1923)
- Children: 2 daughters

Sport
- Sport: Athletics, track, pole vault
- Events: Triple Jump, Pole Vault, Sprint track
- College team: University of Pennsylvania
- Club: Chicago Athletic Association (CAA)
- Coached by: Martin Delaney (Chicago Athletic); Lawson Robertson (U. Penn)

Achievements and titles
- Olympic finals: 1920 Antwerp, triple jump, 5th

Sherman George Landers (March 24, 1898 – May 15, 1994) was an American track and field athlete and world record holder who competed for the University of Pennsylvania and participated in the 1920 Antwerp Olympics where he placed fifth in the triple jump competition. After his athletic career, he had a long and successful career as an advertising executive, making partner with the firm of Gray and Rodgers, where he retired in 1968 after a career of forty-five years.

== Early life ==
Landers was born the youngest of three male siblings in Oregon, Illinois on March 24, 1898 to Ziba Alphonso Landers, and the former Harriett Phoebe Spickerman. From an educated and accomplished family, Sherman's father published the Oregon, Illinois Republican, originally the Ogle County Republican, and later known as the Oregon Republican Reporter. Sherman attended Oregon High School, where he set both world and national records in the triple jump, high hurdles, broad jump, and perhaps his signature event, the pole vault. He became the American pole vault champion in 1916, when he made a 12 foot 8 inch jump, using only a bamboo pole. The record was just four inches short of the world record.

Exhibiting diverse skills in track and field, in 1919-20, Landers captured first place in the AAU National title in the triple jump. In 1916, he captured a second AAU national title in the pole vault.

== University of Pennsylvania ==
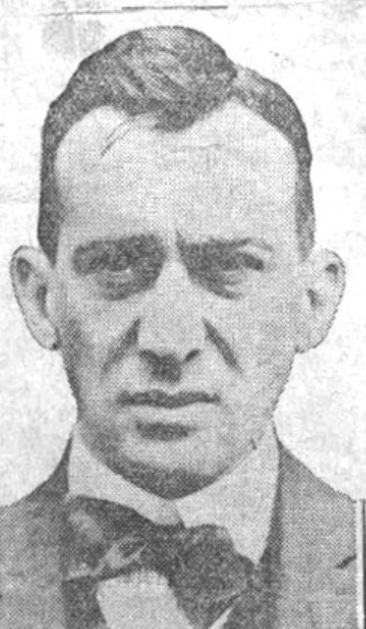
Penn Coach L. Robertson, 1916

He attended the University of Pennsylvania from 1916-1920, where he was coached, trained and managed in track and field by Head Penn Coach Lawson Robertson. While at Penn, he captained one of the highest achieving University of Pennsylvania track teams of the era. On June 7, 1919, Landers ran on the University of Pennsylvania relay team that established a new world record for the 4x110-yard and 4x220-yard events. The 4x220 event was achieved with teammates F.S. Davis, W.C. Haymond, and Elmer Smith, and set a time of 1:27.4. The 4x110-yard record was the first IAAF-approved world record for that distance.

Landers was a versatile athlete, winning the AAU title in the triple jump in 1919-20, and in the pole vault in 1916. In 1920, he was voted to the All American team in track and field. A competent scholar, he graduated Pennsylvania's Whartons School of business with a B.S. in Economics, and began a successful and noteworthy career in advertising. In club competition, he competed for the Chicago Athletic Association, where he was coached by physical director and track coachMartin A. Delaney.

== 1920 Antwerp Olympics ==
At the 1920 Antwerp Olympics, Landers was managed and trained by his college coach Lawson Robertson who served that year as the Olympic men's Head Track and Field Coach. Competing between August 19-21, Landers finished fifth in the triple jump competition with a final jump distance of 14.170 meters. Ville Tulos of Finland won the gold with a jump of 14.505, though it was not close to the Olympic record of 14.92. Folke Jansson of Sweden won the Silver with a jump of 14.480, and Erik Almlof, another member of the Swedish team won the bronze with a jump of 14.270.

== Marriage ==
Landers married Marian Catherine Ludden on June 23, 1923, in Philadelphia, Pennsylvania. They honeymooned in Detroit, Michigan, then returned for a visit near Landers hometown in greater DeKalb, Illinois. They then returned to Philadelphia where they planned to live.

== Honors ==
As a collegiate athlete, Landers was voted to the All American squad in 1920. Landers-Loomis Field at Oregon High School in Oregon, Illinois, is named in part for him and for his Oregon and Olympic teammate Frank Loomis.

== Careers ==
An accomplished student, he lectured for a period at his alma mater, the Wharton's School of Finance. As an advertising executive after college, he first worked for Philadelphia's large Aitken-Kynett Company for an eight-year stretch beginning in 1920. While serving in his four decade career with Gray and Rogers in Philadelphia, he ascended to the role of Senior Partner and became an important innovator in the field of advertising for the automobile industry. After a long career, he retired Gray and Rogers at age 70 around 1968.

Remaining active in the athletics community, Landers was an official for IC4A pole vault competition for 35 years in both national and international events.

== Death ==
Landers died at 96, at the Springfield Rehabilitation Center in Springfield Township, Delaware County, Pennsylvania on May 30, 1994. He was pre-deceased by his wife Marian C. Ludden Landers, and two daughters. Memorial services were held June 6 at Philadelphia's Church of St. Martin-in-the-Fields on St. Martins Lane. A staunch supporter of Penn track, he requested contribution be made in his memory to the University of Pennsylvania Track Team.
