= 1904 Missouri Tigers football team =

American college football season

1904 Missouri Tigers football
- Conference: Independent
- Record: 3–6
- Head coach: John McLean (2nd season)
- Captain: Homer J. Haggard
- Home stadium: Rollins Field

1904 Midwestern college football independents records
	Conf.			Overall
Team	W	L	T	W		L		T
Saint Louis		–		10	–	0	–	0
Bethany (KS)		–		7	–	0	–	0
Northern Illinois State		–		5	–	0	–	0
Cape Girardeau Normal		–		2	–	0	–	0
Haskell		–		8	–	1	–	0
Cincinnati		–		7	–	1	–	0
Butler		–		6	–	1	–	0
Doane		–		5	–	1	–	0
Kansas		–		8	–	1	–	1
DePauw		–		8	–	2	–	0
Iowa State		–		7	–	2	–	0
Ohio Northern		–		7	–	2	–	1
Michigan State Normal		–		6	–	2	–	0
Wittenberg		–		6	–	2	–	0
Marquette		–		5	–	2	–	0
Nebraska		–		7	–	3	–	0
Detroit College		–		4	–	2	–	0
South Dakota State		–		4	–	2	–	1
Notre Dame		–		5	–	3	–	0
Iowa State Normal		–		5	–	3	–	1
Western Illinois		–		6	–	4	–	0
Heidelberg		–		6	–	4	–	1
Drake		–		5	–	4	–	0
Carthage		–		0	–	0	–	2
North Dakota Agricultural		–		3	–	3	–	0
Wabash		–		4	–	4	–	0
Fairmount		–		4	–	5	–	0
Lake Forest		–		3	–	5	–	1
Ohio Medical		–		2	–	4	–	2
Washington University		–		4	–	7	–	0
Ohio		–		2	–	4	–	1
Missouri		–		3	–	6	–	0
Mount Union		–		2	–	6	–	0
Miami (OH)		–		1	–	5	–	0
Kansas State		–		1	–	6	–	0
American Medical		–		0	–	3	–	0

The 1904 Missouri Tigers football team was an American football team that represented the University of Missouri as an independent during the 1904 college football season. The team compiled a 3–6 record and was outscored by its opponents by a combined total of 130 to 50. John McLean was the head coach for the second of three seasons. The team played its home games at Rollins Field in Columbia, Missouri.

== Schedule ==
Date	Time	Opponent	Site	Result	Attendance	Source
October 1		Kirksville Normal	Rollins Field; Columbia, MO	W 6–0		
October 7		Simpson	Rollins Field; Columbia, MO	W 7–0		
October 15		vs. Haskell	Association Park; Kansas City, MO	L 0–39	3,500	
October 22		Kentucky University	Rollins Field; Columbia, MO	W 37–6	1,100	
October 28	2:30 p.m.	vs. Purdue	World's Fair Stadium; St. Louis, MO	L 0–11	3,000	
November 5	2:30 p.m.	at Washington University	World's Fair Stadium; St. Louis, MO	L 0–11		
November 12		Saint Louis	Rollins Field; Columbia, MO	L 0–17		
November 16		Washburn	Rollins Field; Columbia, MO	L 0–18		
November 24		Kansas	Sportsman's Park; Kansas City, MO (rivalry)	L 0–29	10,000	
