= 1904 Washington University football team =

American college football season

1904 Washington University football
- Conference: Independent
- Record: 4–7
- Head coach: L. W. Boynton (2nd season)
- Home stadium: World's Fair Stadium

1904 Midwestern college football independents records
| | Conf. | | | Overall |
| Team | W | L | T | W | | L | | T |
|---|---|---|---|---|---|---|---|---|
| Saint Louis | | – | | 10 | – | 0 | – | 0 |
| Bethany (KS) | | – | | 7 | – | 0 | – | 0 |
| Northern Illinois State | | – | | 5 | – | 0 | – | 0 |
| Cape Girardeau Normal | | – | | 2 | – | 0 | – | 0 |
| Haskell | | – | | 8 | – | 1 | – | 0 |
| Cincinnati | | – | | 7 | – | 1 | – | 0 |
| Butler | | – | | 6 | – | 1 | – | 0 |
| Doane | | – | | 5 | – | 1 | – | 0 |
| Kansas | | – | | 8 | – | 1 | – | 1 |
| DePauw | | – | | 8 | – | 2 | – | 0 |
| Iowa State | | – | | 7 | – | 2 | – | 0 |
| Ohio Northern | | – | | 7 | – | 2 | – | 1 |
| Michigan State Normal | | – | | 6 | – | 2 | – | 0 |
| Wittenberg | | – | | 6 | – | 2 | – | 0 |
| Marquette | | – | | 5 | – | 2 | – | 0 |
| Nebraska | | – | | 7 | – | 3 | – | 0 |
| Detroit College | | – | | 4 | – | 2 | – | 0 |
| South Dakota State | | – | | 4 | – | 2 | – | 1 |
| Notre Dame | | – | | 5 | – | 3 | – | 0 |
| Iowa State Normal | | – | | 5 | – | 3 | – | 1 |
| Western Illinois | | – | | 6 | – | 4 | – | 0 |
| Heidelberg | | – | | 6 | – | 4 | – | 1 |
| Drake | | – | | 5 | – | 4 | – | 0 |
| Carthage | | – | | 0 | – | 0 | – | 2 |
| North Dakota Agricultural | | – | | 3 | – | 3 | – | 0 |
| Wabash | | – | | 4 | – | 4 | – | 0 |
| Fairmount | | – | | 4 | – | 5 | – | 0 |
| Lake Forest | | – | | 3 | – | 5 | – | 1 |
| Ohio Medical | | – | | 2 | – | 4 | – | 2 |
| Washington University | | – | | 4 | – | 7 | – | 0 |
| Ohio | | – | | 2 | – | 4 | – | 1 |
| Missouri | | – | | 3 | – | 6 | – | 0 |
| Mount Union | | – | | 2 | – | 6 | – | 0 |
| Miami (OH) | | – | | 1 | – | 5 | – | 0 |
| Kansas State | | – | | 1 | – | 6 | – | 0 |
| American Medical | | – | | 0 | – | 3 | – | 0 |

The 1904 Washington University football team represented Washington University in St. Louis as an independent during the 1904 college football season. Led by L. W. Boynton in his second and final season as head coach, the team compiled a record of 4–7 and was outscored by its opponents 162 to 85. Washington University played all 11 of its games at home in St. Louis, at the newly-opened World's Fair Stadium—now known as Francis Olympic Field—on the grounds of the Louisiana Purchase Exposition, also known as the St. Louis World's Fair. The stadium also hosted the 1904 Summer Olympics.

== Schedule ==
| Date | Time | Opponent | Site | Result | Source |
|---|---|---|---|---|---|
| September 28 | 2:30 p.m. | Shurtleff | World's Fair Stadium; St. Louis, MO | W 10–0 | |
| October 5 | 2:30 p.m. | Rose Polytechnic | World's Fair Stadium; St. Louis, MO | W 17–5 | |
| October 8 | 2:30 p.m. | Illinois | World's Fair Stadium; St. Louis, MO | L 0–31 | |
| October 15 | 2:30 p.m. | Sewawnee | World's Fair Stadium; St. Louis, MO | L 0–17 | |
| October 19 | 2:30 p.m. | Drury | World's Fair Stadium; St. Louis, MO | W 36–0 | |
| October 22 | 2:30 p.m. | Indiana | World's Fair Stadium; St. Louis, MO | L 6–21 | |
| October 29 | 3:00 p.m. | Texas | World's Fair Stadium; St. Louis, MO | L 0–23 | |
| November 5 | 2:30 p.m. | Missouri | World's Fair Stadium; St. Louis, MO | W 11–0 | |
| November 12 | 3:00 p.m. | Kansas | World's Fair Stadium; St. Louis, MO | L 0–12 | |
| November 19 | 2:30 p.m. | West Virginia | World's Fair Stadium; St. Louis, MO | L 5–6 | |
| November 24 | 3:00 p.m. | Haskell | World's Fair Stadium; St. Louis, MO | L 0–47 | |
