= 1904 Haskell Indians football team =

American college football season

1904 Haskell Indians football
- Conference: Independent
- Record: 8–1
- Head coach: Albert E. Herrnstein (2nd season)

1904 Midwestern college football independents records
	Conf.			Overall
Team	W	L	T	W		L		T
Saint Louis		–		10	–	0	–	0
Bethany (KS)		–		7	–	0	–	0
Northern Illinois State		–		5	–	0	–	0
Cape Girardeau Normal		–		2	–	0	–	0
Haskell		–		8	–	1	–	0
Cincinnati		–		7	–	1	–	0
Butler		–		6	–	1	–	0
Doane		–		5	–	1	–	0
Kansas		–		8	–	1	–	1
DePauw		–		8	–	2	–	0
Iowa State		–		7	–	2	–	0
Ohio Northern		–		7	–	2	–	1
Michigan State Normal		–		6	–	2	–	0
Wittenberg		–		6	–	2	–	0
Marquette		–		5	–	2	–	0
Nebraska		–		7	–	3	–	0
Detroit College		–		4	–	2	–	0
South Dakota State		–		4	–	2	–	1
Notre Dame		–		5	–	3	–	0
Iowa State Normal		–		5	–	3	–	1
Western Illinois		–		6	–	4	–	0
Heidelberg		–		6	–	4	–	1
Drake		–		5	–	4	–	0
Carthage		–		0	–	0	–	2
North Dakota Agricultural		–		3	–	3	–	0
Wabash		–		4	–	4	–	0
Fairmount		–		4	–	5	–	0
Lake Forest		–		3	–	5	–	1
Ohio Medical		–		2	–	4	–	2
Washington University		–		4	–	7	–	0
Ohio		–		2	–	4	–	1
Missouri		–		3	–	6	–	0
Mount Union		–		2	–	6	–	0
Miami (OH)		–		1	–	5	–	0
Kansas State		–		1	–	6	–	0
American Medical		–		0	–	3	–	0

The 1904 Haskell Indians football team represented the Haskell Institute—now known as Haskell Indian Nations University— as an independent during the 1904 college football season. Led by Albert E. Herrnstein in his second and final season as head coach, the Indians compiled a record of 8–1.

== Schedule ==
Date	Time	Opponent	Site	Result	Attendance	Source
September 23		Friends	Lawrence, KS	W 47–0		
October 1		at Ottawa	Ottawa, KS	W 34–0		
October 6		at Kansas	McCook Field; Lawrence, KS	W 17–0	3,000	
October 15		vs. Missouri	Association Park; Kansas City, MO	W 39–0	3,500	
October 21		at Texas	Varsity Athletic Field; Austin, TX	W 4–0		
November 12	2:37 p.m.	vs. Nebraska	Association Park; Kansas City, MO	W 14–6	3,000	
November 19		at Washburn	Topeka, KS	W 14–0		
November 24	3:00 p.m.	at Washington University	World's Fair Stadium; St. Louis, MO	W 47–0		
November 26		vs. Carlisle	World's Fair Stadium; St. Louis, MO	L 4–38	12,000	
