= 1904 Bethany Terrible Swedes football team =

American college football season

1904 Bethany Terrible Swedes football
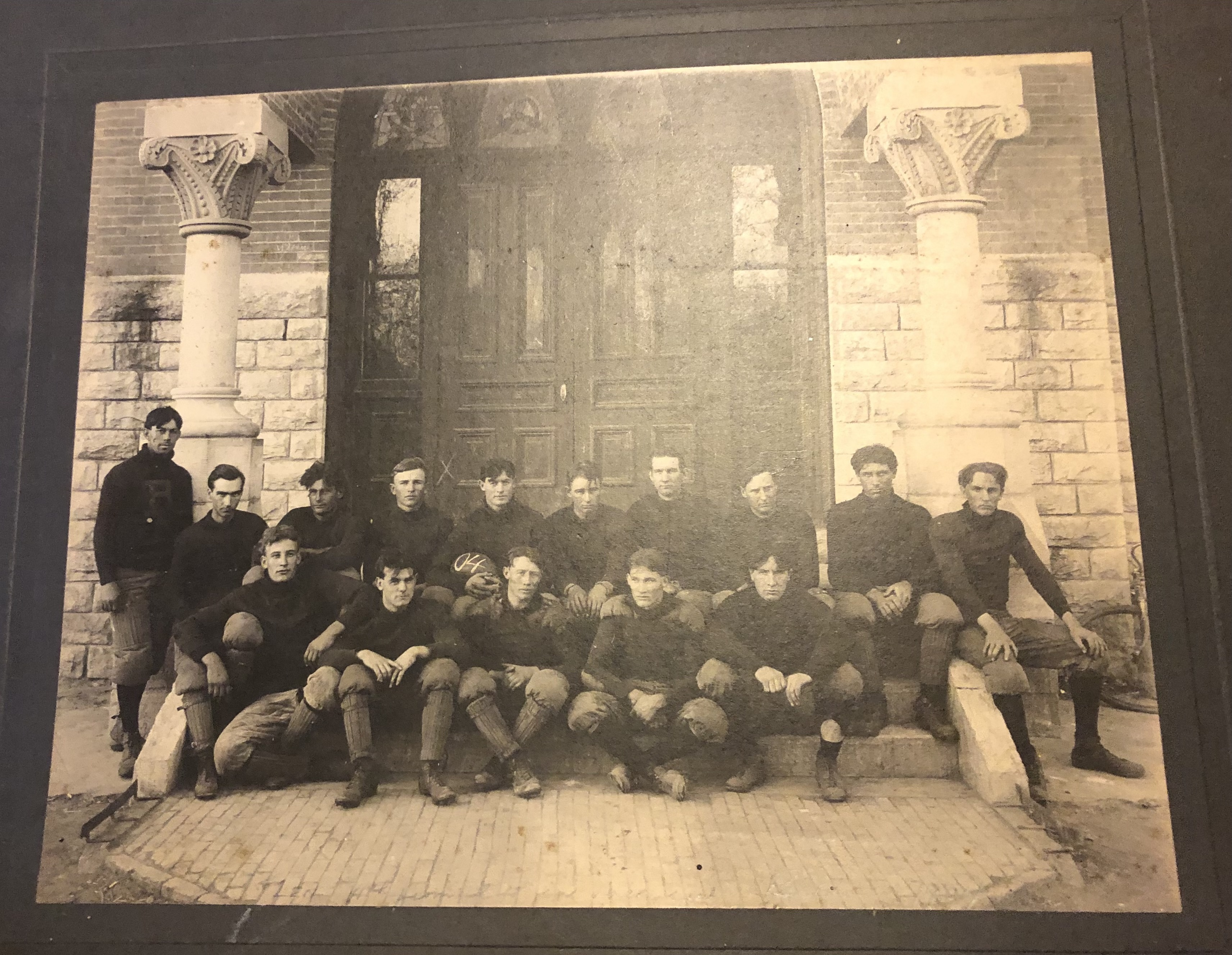
- Conference: Independent
- Record: 7–0
- Head coach: Bennie Owen (3rd season)
- Captain: W. F. Banbury
- Home stadium: Bethany athletic field

1904 Midwestern college football independents records
	Conf.			Overall
Team	W	L	T	W		L		T
Saint Louis		–		10	–	0	–	0
Bethany (KS)		–		7	–	0	–	0
Northern Illinois State		–		5	–	0	–	0
Cape Girardeau Normal		–		2	–	0	–	0
Haskell		–		8	–	1	–	0
Cincinnati		–		7	–	1	–	0
Butler		–		6	–	1	–	0
Doane		–		5	–	1	–	0
Kansas		–		8	–	1	–	1
DePauw		–		8	–	2	–	0
Iowa State		–		7	–	2	–	0
Ohio Northern		–		7	–	2	–	1
Michigan State Normal		–		6	–	2	–	0
Wittenberg		–		6	–	2	–	0
Marquette		–		5	–	2	–	0
Nebraska		–		7	–	3	–	0
Detroit College		–		4	–	2	–	0
South Dakota State		–		4	–	2	–	1
Notre Dame		–		5	–	3	–	0
Iowa State Normal		–		5	–	3	–	1
Western Illinois		–		6	–	4	–	0
Heidelberg		–		6	–	4	–	1
Drake		–		5	–	4	–	0
Carthage		–		0	–	0	–	2
North Dakota Agricultural		–		3	–	3	–	0
Wabash		–		4	–	4	–	0
Fairmount		–		4	–	5	–	0
Lake Forest		–		3	–	5	–	1
Ohio Medical		–		2	–	4	–	2
Washington University		–		4	–	7	–	0
Ohio		–		2	–	4	–	1
Missouri		–		3	–	6	–	0
Mount Union		–		2	–	6	–	0
Miami (OH)		–		1	–	5	–	0
Kansas State		–		1	–	6	–	0
American Medical		–		0	–	3	–	0

The 1904 Bethany Terrible Swedes football team represented Bethany College as an independent during the 1904 college football season. Led by Bennie Owen in his third and final season as head coach, the Terrible Swedes compiled a perfect record of 7–0. Bethany beat Oklahoma, 36–9, in the season finale.

== Schedule ==
Date	Time	Opponent	Site	Result	Attendance	Source
October 1	3:00 p.m.	Chilocco	Lindsborg, KS	W 23–0		
October 14		Cooper	Lindsborg, KS	W 82–6		
October 22	3:30 p.m.	at Fairmount	Wichita, KS	W 17–0		
October 28		at Kansas State	Manhattan, KS	W 28–5		
November 5		Kansas State Normal	Bethany athletic field; Lindsborg, KS	W 16–0		
November 17		Ottawa	Lindsborg, KS	W 71–0		
November 24	3:00 p.m.	vs. Oklahoma	Colcord Park; Oklahoma City, Oklahoma Territory	W 36–9	2,000	
