= Martin Delaney (coach) =

American football and track and field coach, athletic director (1872–1926)

Martin A. Delaney
- Delaney circa 1920s, as Chicago Athletic Association track coach and physical director

Biographical details
- Born: January 10, 1872; Westborough, Massachusetts, U.S.
- Died: June 1, 1926 (aged 54); Chicago, Illinois, U.S.

Coaching career (HC unless noted)

Football
- 1899–1904: Saint Louis

Track and field
- c. 1900: Saint Louis
- 1904–1909: Kansas City Athletic Club
- 1909–1926: Chicago Athletic Association

Administrative career (AD unless noted)
- 1905–1909: Kansas City Athletic Club
- 1909–1926: Chicago Athletic Association

Head coaching record
- Overall: 32–19–4 (college football)

Accomplishments and honors

Championships
- Football; St. Louis Worlds Fair (1904)

Martin Albert Delaney (January 10, 1872 – June 1, 1926) was an American college football and track and field coach. He was best known for serving as a physical director and track and field coach at the Chicago Athletic Association from 1909 to 1925. He served as the first football coach at Saint Louis University from 1899 to 1904, where he led 1904 Saint Louis Blue and White football team to an undefeated season. He served as a physical director and track and basketball coach at the Kansas City Athletic Club from 1905 to 1909. Early in his career, Delaney served as a U.S. general manager for the 1904 St. Louis Olympics. Delaney mentored 1904 St. Louis Olympic bronze medalist and 1906 Olympic track athlete Fay Moulton at the Kansas City Club, and coached Frank Loomis, a 1920 gold medalist in the 400 meter hurdles while he was training at the Chicago Athletic Association. He helped lead Frank K. Foss to a 1920 gold medal in the pole vault with a world record jump of 4.09 meters. Fourteen of the track and field athletes who qualified for the 1920 Olympics at the at the 1920 Outdoor AAU Track and Field Championships in Boston were trained and mentored by Delaney at the Chicago Athletic Association. The 1920 AAU Track and Field Championships served as the U.S. Olympic Trial finals that year.

== Early life ==
Delaney was born January 10, 1872, in Westborough, Massachusetts. Though Delaney's brother, Jerry, was known as a talented runner, Martin was not known to have competed in track and field. Nonetheless, his studies of the sport of track, and particularly pole vaulting led him to develop Olympic champions in both sports.

== Coaching career ==
=== Saint Louis University ===
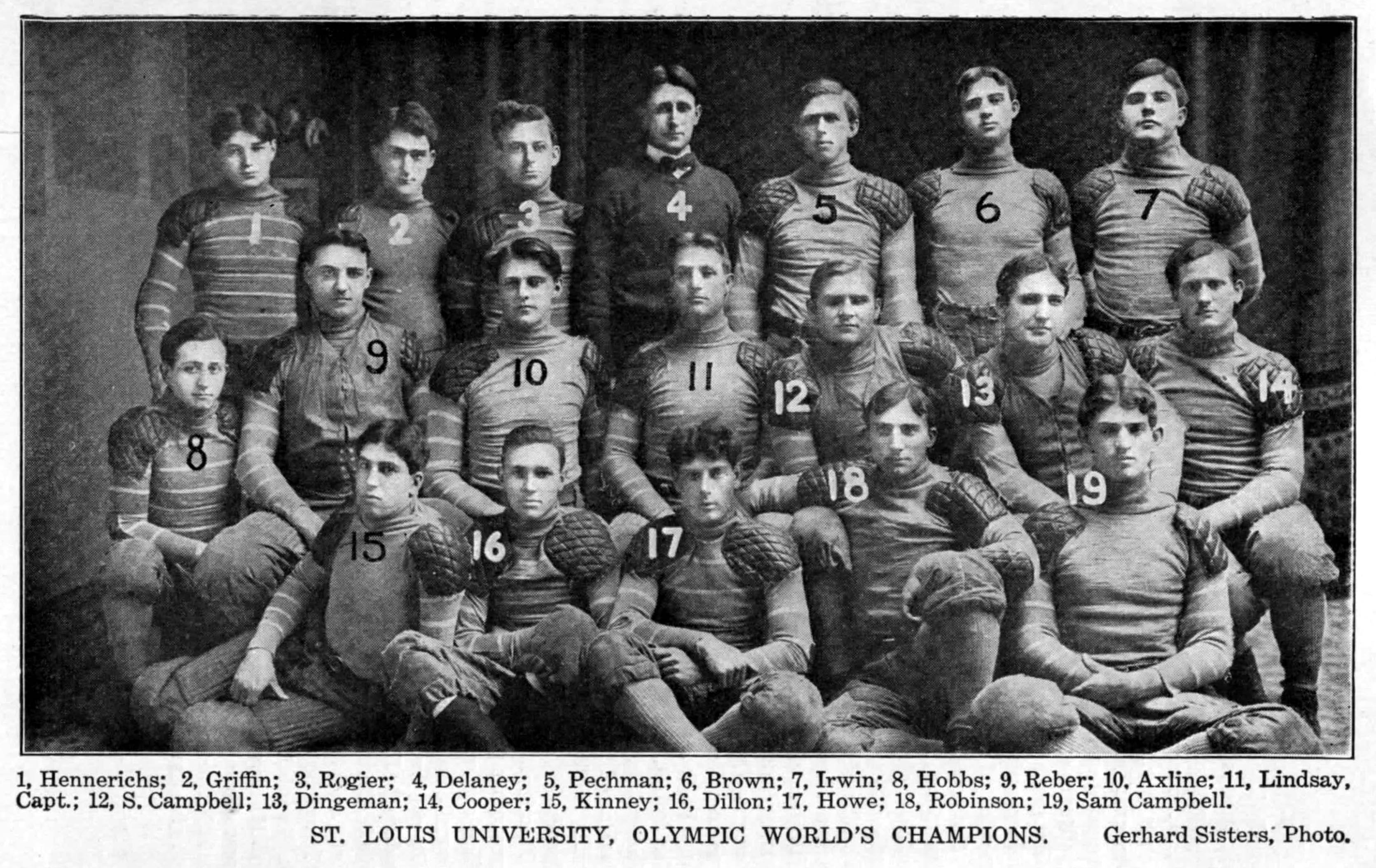
1904 Saint Louis Blue and White football team; Delaney back row, center

Delaney was the first head football coach at Saint Louis University, serving from 1899 to 1904. He also coached track and field at the University. In October and November 1904, Delaney coached the 1904 Saint Louis Blue and White football team to an undefeated season. Several publications deemed the Saint Louis team Olympic World Champions as they won the St. Louis World's Fair Exhibition, also known as the Louisiana Purchase Exhibition championship, which was loosely associated with the 1904 Summer Olympics, as it was held at the same time, used some of the same facilities, and included many of the same spectators.

Other football teams included at the World's Fair Exhibition games attended by St. Louis University included the University of Kentucky, the University of Arkansas, and the University of Missouri. St. Louis beat the Missouri team 17-0, holding them scoreless in a noteworthy victory. As Haskell Institute beat the Missouri team 38-0, a few sports writers believe Haskel Institute may have deserved the Exhibition championship more than St. Louis University, but prior scoring was considered and Haskell Institute had given up six points to two of their opponents. A more significant argument favoring Haskell Institute as a more worthy Olympic or World Fair champion, would be that they had a more demanding football schedule, playing more accomplished and better known teams.

Delaney wrote that his undefeated 1904 football season with St. Louis University could partly be attributed to benefitting from the financial stimulus provided by the Physical Culture Department that sponsored the Louisiana Purchase Exhibition games.

=== Kansas City Athletic Club ===
Delaney left Saint Louis University in 1905 to become the athletic director of the Kansas City Athletic Club in Kansas City, Missouri, where he also coached track and field and basketball. The 1905–06 Kansas City basketball team went undefeated, establishing Delaney's ability to develop a strong, winning team in a short time. Delaney was credited with developing Fay Moulton, a 1903 Yale Law School graduate at the Kansas City Club by 1906. Moulton placed fourth at the 1904 St. Louis Olympics in both the 200 m and 100 m events in addition to his bronze medal performance in the 60 meter event. At the 1906 Incalated Olympic Games in Athens he placed sixth in the 400 m. event.

At the age of 35, Delaney married Jessie O'Rear, 25, most recently of Kansas City, Missouri in June, 1909. Jessie, who died in 1969, was a Kentucky native and had formerly resided in San Antonio and New Braunsfeld, Texas, but resided 30 years in Belleville, Illinois in her late years.

=== Chicago Athletic Association ===
Delaney 1909

In 1909, Delaney resigned from his post at the Kansas City Athletic Club to become the physical director of the Cherry Circle Club in Chicago which was also known as the Chicago Athletic Association.

As coach of the Chicago Athletic Association (CAA) after 1909, his track and field teams won the American Athletic Union Central Outdoor Track and Field Championships for ten successive years, and the indoor title for twelve successive years. In March, 1917, Delaney's C.A.A. teams won the National AAU Indoor Championship in New York, then won the Outdoor Championship in St. Louis the same year. In 1918, his CAA teams won the Junior and Senior National AAU Track and Field Championships at the Naval Training Station at Great Lakes. He did much of his coaching during the first World War at Fort Sheridan and the Great Lakes Naval training Station. In 1920, fourteen of Delaney's athletes qualified for the U.S. Olympic track team, based on their performances at the National AAU Track and Field Championships held in Boston, which doubled as the American 1920 Olympic trials.

In 1920, Delaney became the General Manager of the Chicago Athletic Association, serving through 1925, when he tendered his resignation, and became manager of Chicago's Midway Athletic Club.

==== Outstanding CAA athletes ====
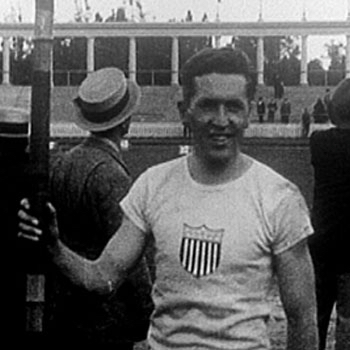
Pole Vaulter Frank K. Foss

While at the Chicago Athletic Association, Delaney coached Frank K. Foss who won a pole vaulting gold medal at the 1920 Olympics and set a world record, clearing 4.09 meters or in English distance, (13’-5 1/8”). At the Chicago Athletic Association, Delaney also coached Earl Eby, a 1915 National titlist in the 880 yard event, a 1920 half mile title winner and an indoor winner of the 600 yard event in national indoor competition. Eby won a silver medal in the 1920 Antwerp Olympics in the 800 meter event.

Another of Delaney's 1920 Olympic athletes who he coached at the Chicago Athletic Club, Sherman Landers, placed fifth in the triple jump competition at the 1920 Olympics with a final jump distance of 14.170 meters.

Delaney also helped train and develop Frank Loomis at the CAA, the 1920 Antwerp Olympic Gold Medalist in the 400 meter hurdles, and his brother Jo who was an alternate for the track team that year. Frank Loomis began training with the Chicago Athletic Association as early as 1910, and certainly was coached by Delaney by 1915.

== Death ==
Delaney died on June 1, 1926, in Chicago. He collapsed on his way to the Midway Athletic Club where he had most recently been employed. He was survived for 43 years by his wife, Jessie O'Rear Delaney who lived to 85. Delaney's mass was held at the St. Phillip of Neri Catholic Church. His death was attributed to heart disease, though he had been injured when a bus carrying several members of his Chicago Athletic Association team overturned causing him internal injuries a few months prior to his death. Delaney was buried at Holy Sepulchre Cemetery, in Alsip, Illinois, where his wife Jessie was buried in February 1969.

== Head coaching record ==
=== College football ===
Year	Team	Overall	Conference	Standing	Bowl/playoffs
Saint Louis Blue and White (Independent) (1899–1904)
1899	Saint Louis	2–4–1			
1900	Saint Louis	5–5			
1901	Saint Louis	10–0			
1902	Saint Louis	2–6–2			
1903	Saint Louis	3–4–1			
1904	Saint Louis	10–0			
Saint Louis:		32–19–4			
Total:		32–19–4			
