= 1904 Northern Illinois State Normal football team =

American college football season

1904 Northern Illinois State Normal football
- Conference: Independent
- Record: 5–0
- Head coach: Dixie Fleager (1st season)
- Captain: Alvin Farr
- Home stadium: Glidden Field

1904 Midwestern college football independents records
	Conf.			Overall
Team	W	L	T	W		L		T
Saint Louis		–		10	–	0	–	0
Bethany (KS)		–		7	–	0	–	0
Northern Illinois State		–		5	–	0	–	0
Cape Girardeau Normal		–		2	–	0	–	0
Haskell		–		8	–	1	–	0
Cincinnati		–		7	–	1	–	0
Butler		–		6	–	1	–	0
Doane		–		5	–	1	–	0
Kansas		–		8	–	1	–	1
DePauw		–		8	–	2	–	0
Iowa State		–		7	–	2	–	0
Ohio Northern		–		7	–	2	–	1
Michigan State Normal		–		6	–	2	–	0
Wittenberg		–		6	–	2	–	0
Marquette		–		5	–	2	–	0
Nebraska		–		7	–	3	–	0
Detroit College		–		4	–	2	–	0
South Dakota State		–		4	–	2	–	1
Notre Dame		–		5	–	3	–	0
Iowa State Normal		–		5	–	3	–	1
Western Illinois		–		6	–	4	–	0
Heidelberg		–		6	–	4	–	1
Drake		–		5	–	4	–	0
Carthage		–		0	–	0	–	2
North Dakota Agricultural		–		3	–	3	–	0
Wabash		–		4	–	4	–	0
Fairmount		–		4	–	5	–	0
Lake Forest		–		3	–	5	–	1
Ohio Medical		–		2	–	4	–	2
Washington University		–		4	–	7	–	0
Ohio		–		2	–	4	–	1
Missouri		–		3	–	6	–	0
Mount Union		–		2	–	6	–	0
Miami (OH)		–		1	–	5	–	0
Kansas State		–		1	–	6	–	0
American Medical		–		0	–	3	–	0

The 1904 Northern Illinois State Normal football team represented Northern Illinois State Normal College as an independent in the 1904 college football season. They were led by first-year head coach Dixie Fleager and played their home games at Glidden Field, located on the east end of campus. The team finished the season with a 5–0 record. Alvin Farr was the team's captain.

== Schedule ==
Date	Opponent	Site	Result	Source
October 8	Sterling Business College	Glidden Field; DeKalb, IL	W 28–0	
October 22	Platteville Normal	Glidden Field; DeKalb, IL	W 11–6	
November 5	Alumni	Glidden Field; DeKalb, IL	W 21–0	
November 12	at Western Illinois	Macomb, IL	W 15–0	
November 24	at Whitewater State	Whitewater, WI	W 12–11	
