= 1904 Drake Bulldogs football team =

American college football season

1904 Drake Bulldogs football
- Conference: Independent
- Record: 5–4
- Head coach: W. J. Monilaw (2nd season)
- Home stadium: Haskins Field

1904 Midwestern college football independents records
	Conf.			Overall
Team	W	L	T	W		L		T
Saint Louis		–		10	–	0	–	0
Bethany (KS)		–		7	–	0	–	0
Northern Illinois State		–		5	–	0	–	0
Cape Girardeau Normal		–		2	–	0	–	0
Haskell		–		8	–	1	–	0
Cincinnati		–		7	–	1	–	0
Butler		–		6	–	1	–	0
Doane		–		5	–	1	–	0
Kansas		–		8	–	1	–	1
DePauw		–		8	–	2	–	0
Iowa State		–		7	–	2	–	0
Ohio Northern		–		7	–	2	–	1
Michigan State Normal		–		6	–	2	–	0
Wittenberg		–		6	–	2	–	0
Marquette		–		5	–	2	–	0
Nebraska		–		7	–	3	–	0
Detroit College		–		4	–	2	–	0
South Dakota State		–		4	–	2	–	1
Notre Dame		–		5	–	3	–	0
Iowa State Normal		–		5	–	3	–	1
Western Illinois		–		6	–	4	–	0
Heidelberg		–		6	–	4	–	1
Drake		–		5	–	4	–	0
Carthage		–		0	–	0	–	2
North Dakota Agricultural		–		3	–	3	–	0
Wabash		–		4	–	4	–	0
Fairmount		–		4	–	5	–	0
Lake Forest		–		3	–	5	–	1
Ohio Medical		–		2	–	4	–	2
Washington University		–		4	–	7	–	0
Ohio		–		2	–	4	–	1
Missouri		–		3	–	6	–	0
Mount Union		–		2	–	6	–	0
Miami (OH)		–		1	–	5	–	0
Kansas State		–		1	–	6	–	0
American Medical		–		0	–	3	–	0

The 1904 Drake Bulldogs football team was an American football team that represented Drake University as an independent during the 1904 college football season. In its second season under head coach W. J. Monilaw, the team compiled a 5–4 record and outscored opponents by a total of 213 to 165.

The team played its home games at Haskins Field. The stadium was dedicated by Governor Albert B. Cummins on October 8, 1904.

== Schedule ==
Date	Opponent	Site	Result	Attendance	Source
October 1	Buena Vista	Des Moines, IA	W 18–0		
October 8	Iowa	Haskins Field; Des Moines, IA	L 0–17		
October 15	Coe	Haskins Field; Des Moines, IA	W 52–0		
October 22	at Wisconsin	Randall Field; Madison, WI	L 0–81		
October 29	Grinnell	Haskins Field; Des Moines, IA	W 67–0		
November 5	Michigan	Haskins Field; Des Moines, IA	L 4–36	3,000	
November 13	at Simpson	Indianola, IA	W 46–5		
November 19	Iowa State Normal	Haskins Field; Des Moines, IA (rivalry)	W 26–6		
November 24	Iowa State	Haskins Field; Des Moines, IA	L 0–19	5,000	
