= 1904 Kansas Jayhawks football team =

American college football season

1904 Kansas Jayhawks football
- Conference: Independent
- Record: 8–1–1
- Head coach: A. R. Kennedy (1st season)
- Captain: Albert Hicks
- Home stadium: McCook Field

1904 Midwestern college football independents records
	Conf.			Overall
Team	W	L	T	W		L		T
Saint Louis		–		10	–	0	–	0
Bethany (KS)		–		7	–	0	–	0
Northern Illinois State		–		5	–	0	–	0
Cape Girardeau Normal		–		2	–	0	–	0
Haskell		–		8	–	1	–	0
Cincinnati		–		7	–	1	–	0
Butler		–		6	–	1	–	0
Doane		–		5	–	1	–	0
Kansas		–		8	–	1	–	1
DePauw		–		8	–	2	–	0
Iowa State		–		7	–	2	–	0
Ohio Northern		–		7	–	2	–	1
Michigan State Normal		–		6	–	2	–	0
Wittenberg		–		6	–	2	–	0
Marquette		–		5	–	2	–	0
Nebraska		–		7	–	3	–	0
Detroit College		–		4	–	2	–	0
South Dakota State		–		4	–	2	–	1
Notre Dame		–		5	–	3	–	0
Iowa State Normal		–		5	–	3	–	1
Western Illinois		–		6	–	4	–	0
Heidelberg		–		6	–	4	–	1
Drake		–		5	–	4	–	0
Carthage		–		0	–	0	–	2
North Dakota Agricultural		–		3	–	3	–	0
Wabash		–		4	–	4	–	0
Fairmount		–		4	–	5	–	0
Lake Forest		–		3	–	5	–	1
Ohio Medical		–		2	–	4	–	2
Washington University		–		4	–	7	–	0
Ohio		–		2	–	4	–	1
Missouri		–		3	–	6	–	0
Mount Union		–		2	–	6	–	0
Miami (OH)		–		1	–	5	–	0
Kansas State		–		1	–	6	–	0
American Medical		–		0	–	3	–	0

The 1904 Kansas Jayhawks football team was an American football team that represented the University of Kansas as an independent during the 1904 college football season. In their first season under head coach A. R. Kennedy, the Jayhawks compiled an 8–1–1 record and outscored opponents by a combined total of 179 to 38. The Jayhawks played home games at McCook Field in Lawrence, Kansas. Albert Hicks was the team captain.

== Schedule ==
Date	Time	Opponent	Site	Result	Attendance	Source
September 24		College of Emporia	McCook Field; Lawrence, KS	W 6–0		
October 1		Kansas State Normal	McCook Field; Lawrence, KS	W 34–0		
October 6		Haskell	McCook Field; Lawrence, KS	L 6–23	3,000	
October 15		Colorado	McCook Field; Lawrence, KS	T 6–6		
October 21		at Oklahoma	Norman, Oklahoma Territory	W 16–0		
October 29		at Washburn	Washburn Field; Topeka, KS	W 5–0	2,000	
November 5		Notre Dame	McCook Field; Lawrence, KS	W 24–5		
November 12	3:00 p.m.	vs. Washington University	World's Fair Stadium; St. Louis, MO	W 12–0		
November 19		at Kansas State	Manhattan, KS (rivalry)	W 41–4		
November 24		vs. Missouri	Sportsman's Park; Kansas City, MO (rivalry)	W 29–0	10,000	
