= 1904 DePauw football team =

American college football season

1904 DePauw football
- Conference: Independent
- Record: 8–2
- Head coach: Thomas L. McFadden (1st season)

1904 Midwestern college football independents records
	Conf.			Overall
Team	W	L	T	W		L		T
Saint Louis		–		10	–	0	–	0
Bethany (KS)		–		7	–	0	–	0
Northern Illinois State		–		5	–	0	–	0
Cape Girardeau Normal		–		2	–	0	–	0
Haskell		–		8	–	1	–	0
Cincinnati		–		7	–	1	–	0
Butler		–		6	–	1	–	0
Doane		–		5	–	1	–	0
Kansas		–		8	–	1	–	1
DePauw		–		8	–	2	–	0
Iowa State		–		7	–	2	–	0
Ohio Northern		–		7	–	2	–	1
Michigan State Normal		–		6	–	2	–	0
Wittenberg		–		6	–	2	–	0
Marquette		–		5	–	2	–	0
Nebraska		–		7	–	3	–	0
Detroit College		–		4	–	2	–	0
South Dakota State		–		4	–	2	–	1
Notre Dame		–		5	–	3	–	0
Iowa State Normal		–		5	–	3	–	1
Western Illinois		–		6	–	4	–	0
Heidelberg		–		6	–	4	–	1
Drake		–		5	–	4	–	0
Carthage		–		0	–	0	–	2
North Dakota Agricultural		–		3	–	3	–	0
Wabash		–		4	–	4	–	0
Fairmount		–		4	–	5	–	0
Lake Forest		–		3	–	5	–	1
Ohio Medical		–		2	–	4	–	2
Washington University		–		4	–	7	–	0
Ohio		–		2	–	4	–	1
Missouri		–		3	–	6	–	0
Mount Union		–		2	–	6	–	0
Miami (OH)		–		1	–	5	–	0
Kansas State		–		1	–	6	–	0
American Medical		–		0	–	3	–	0

The 1904 DePauw football team was an American football team that represented DePauw University as an independent during the 1904 college football season. Led by Thomas L. McFadden in his first and only season as head coach, DePauw compiled a record of 8–2.

== Schedule ==
Date	Opponent	Site	Result
	Rose Polytechnic		W 62–0
	Rose Polytechnic		W 40–0
September 24	DePauw alumni	Greencastle, IN	W 10–0
October 3	Wabash Athletic Association	Greencastle, IN	W 5–0
October 8	Indiana State Normal	Greencastle, IN	W 16–0
October 15	Earlham	Greencastle, IN	W 35–0
October 22	Indiana Medical College	Greencastle, IN	W 14–0
October 29	at Northwestern	Sheppard Field; Evanston, IL	L 0–45
November 5	vs. Lake Forest	Indianapolis, IN	W 30–6
November 19	Notre Dame	Cartier Field; Notre Dame, IN	L 0–10
