= 1904 Ohio Northern football team =

American college football season

1904 Ohio Northern football
- Conference: Independent
- Record: 7–2–1
- Head coach: None

1904 Midwestern college football independents records
	Conf.			Overall
Team	W	L	T	W		L		T
Saint Louis		–		10	–	0	–	0
Bethany (KS)		–		7	–	0	–	0
Northern Illinois State		–		5	–	0	–	0
Cape Girardeau Normal		–		2	–	0	–	0
Haskell		–		8	–	1	–	0
Cincinnati		–		7	–	1	–	0
Butler		–		6	–	1	–	0
Doane		–		5	–	1	–	0
Kansas		–		8	–	1	–	1
DePauw		–		8	–	2	–	0
Iowa State		–		7	–	2	–	0
Ohio Northern		–		7	–	2	–	1
Michigan State Normal		–		6	–	2	–	0
Wittenberg		–		6	–	2	–	0
Marquette		–		5	–	2	–	0
Nebraska		–		7	–	3	–	0
Detroit College		–		4	–	2	–	0
South Dakota State		–		4	–	2	–	1
Notre Dame		–		5	–	3	–	0
Iowa State Normal		–		5	–	3	–	1
Western Illinois		–		6	–	4	–	0
Heidelberg		–		6	–	4	–	1
Drake		–		5	–	4	–	0
Carthage		–		0	–	0	–	2
North Dakota Agricultural		–		3	–	3	–	0
Wabash		–		4	–	4	–	0
Fairmount		–		4	–	5	–	0
Lake Forest		–		3	–	5	–	1
Ohio Medical		–		2	–	4	–	2
Washington University		–		4	–	7	–	0
Ohio		–		2	–	4	–	1
Missouri		–		3	–	6	–	0
Mount Union		–		2	–	6	–	0
Miami (OH)		–		1	–	5	–	0
Kansas State		–		1	–	6	–	0
American Medical		–		0	–	3	–	0

The 1904 Ohio Northern football team was an American football team that represented Ohio Northern University during the 1904 college football season. The team compiled a 7–2–1 record and outscored opponents by a total of 471 to 98. The team averaged nearly 50 points per game but was shut out by Michigan.

== Schedule ==
Date	Opponent	Site	Result	Attendance	Source
	Lima St. Mary's AA		W 117–0		
October 1	Fort Wayne Medical		W 75–0		
October 5	at Michigan	Regents Field; Ann Arbor, MI	L 0–48		
October 8	at Michigan Agricultural	College Field; East Lansing, MI	L 6–28		
October 22	Ohio Wesleyan		W 34–6		
October 29	Western Reserve	Ada, OH	T 5–5		
November 5	Otterbein	Ada, OH	W 42–0		
November 12	at Fort Wayne College of Medicine	Fort Wayne, IN	W 18–0	600	
November 19	Ohio Medical		W 23–11		
November 24	at College of Physicians & Surgeons Chicago	Ada, OH	W 151–0		
