= 1904 Michigan State Normal Normalites football team =

American college football season

1904 Michigan State Normal Normalites football
- Conference: Independent
- Record: 6–2
- Head coach: Daniel H. Lawrence (1st season)
- Captain: Sherman R. Wilson

1904 Midwestern college football independents records
	Conf.			Overall
Team	W	L	T	W		L		T
Saint Louis		–		10	–	0	–	0
Bethany (KS)		–		7	–	0	–	0
Northern Illinois State		–		5	–	0	–	0
Cape Girardeau Normal		–		2	–	0	–	0
Haskell		–		8	–	1	–	0
Cincinnati		–		7	–	1	–	0
Butler		–		6	–	1	–	0
Doane		–		5	–	1	–	0
Kansas		–		8	–	1	–	1
DePauw		–		8	–	2	–	0
Iowa State		–		7	–	2	–	0
Ohio Northern		–		7	–	2	–	1
Michigan State Normal		–		6	–	2	–	0
Wittenberg		–		6	–	2	–	0
Marquette		–		5	–	2	–	0
Nebraska		–		7	–	3	–	0
Detroit College		–		4	–	2	–	0
South Dakota State		–		4	–	2	–	1
Notre Dame		–		5	–	3	–	0
Iowa State Normal		–		5	–	3	–	1
Western Illinois		–		6	–	4	–	0
Heidelberg		–		6	–	4	–	1
Drake		–		5	–	4	–	0
Carthage		–		0	–	0	–	2
North Dakota Agricultural		–		3	–	3	–	0
Wabash		–		4	–	4	–	0
Fairmount		–		4	–	5	–	0
Lake Forest		–		3	–	5	–	1
Ohio Medical		–		2	–	4	–	2
Washington University		–		4	–	7	–	0
Ohio		–		2	–	4	–	1
Missouri		–		3	–	6	–	0
Mount Union		–		2	–	6	–	0
Miami (OH)		–		1	–	5	–	0
Kansas State		–		1	–	6	–	0
American Medical		–		0	–	3	–	0

The 1904 Michigan State Normal Normalites football team represented Michigan State Normal College (later renamed Eastern Michigan University) as an independent during the 1904 college football season. In their first season under head coach Daniel H. Lawrence, the Normalites compiled a record of 6–2. However, they were outscored by a combined total of 159 to 121, as a result of routs at the hands of Albion (68–0) and the University of Michigan freshman team (43–0). Sherman R. Wilson was the team captain.

== Schedule ==
Date	Opponent	Site	Result	Source
October 8	Detroit Business University	Ypsilanti, MI	W 24–5	
October 15	at Albion	Winter-Lau Field; Albion, MI	L 0–68	
October 22	at Michigan School for the Deaf	Flint, MI	W 18–11	
October 29	at Michigan freshmen	Ann Arbor, MI	L 0–43	
November 5	at Adrian	Adrian, MI	W 23–11	
November 12	Michigan School for the Deaf	Ypsilanti, MI	W 16–0	
November 19	Adrian	Ypsilanti, MI	W 28–10	
November 24	Hillsdale	Ypsilanti, MI	W 12–11	
