= 1904 Iowa State Cyclones football team =

American college football season

1904 Iowa State Cyclones football
- Conference: Independent
- Record: 7–2
- Head coach: A. W. Ristine (3rd season)
- Captain: Preston Daniels
- Home stadium: State Field

1904 Midwestern college football independents records
| | Conf. | | | Overall |
| Team | W | L | T | W | | L | | T |
|---|---|---|---|---|---|---|---|---|
| Saint Louis | | – | | 10 | – | 0 | – | 0 |
| Bethany (KS) | | – | | 7 | – | 0 | – | 0 |
| Northern Illinois State | | – | | 5 | – | 0 | – | 0 |
| Cape Girardeau Normal | | – | | 2 | – | 0 | – | 0 |
| Haskell | | – | | 8 | – | 1 | – | 0 |
| Cincinnati | | – | | 7 | – | 1 | – | 0 |
| Butler | | – | | 6 | – | 1 | – | 0 |
| Doane | | – | | 5 | – | 1 | – | 0 |
| Kansas | | – | | 8 | – | 1 | – | 1 |
| DePauw | | – | | 8 | – | 2 | – | 0 |
| Iowa State | | – | | 7 | – | 2 | – | 0 |
| Ohio Northern | | – | | 7 | – | 2 | – | 1 |
| Michigan State Normal | | – | | 6 | – | 2 | – | 0 |
| Wittenberg | | – | | 6 | – | 2 | – | 0 |
| Marquette | | – | | 5 | – | 2 | – | 0 |
| Nebraska | | – | | 7 | – | 3 | – | 0 |
| Detroit College | | – | | 4 | – | 2 | – | 0 |
| South Dakota State | | – | | 4 | – | 2 | – | 1 |
| Notre Dame | | – | | 5 | – | 3 | – | 0 |
| Iowa State Normal | | – | | 5 | – | 3 | – | 1 |
| Western Illinois | | – | | 6 | – | 4 | – | 0 |
| Heidelberg | | – | | 6 | – | 4 | – | 1 |
| Drake | | – | | 5 | – | 4 | – | 0 |
| Carthage | | – | | 0 | – | 0 | – | 2 |
| North Dakota Agricultural | | – | | 3 | – | 3 | – | 0 |
| Wabash | | – | | 4 | – | 4 | – | 0 |
| Fairmount | | – | | 4 | – | 5 | – | 0 |
| Lake Forest | | – | | 3 | – | 5 | – | 1 |
| Ohio Medical | | – | | 2 | – | 4 | – | 2 |
| Washington University | | – | | 4 | – | 7 | – | 0 |
| Ohio | | – | | 2 | – | 4 | – | 1 |
| Missouri | | – | | 3 | – | 6 | – | 0 |
| Mount Union | | – | | 2 | – | 6 | – | 0 |
| Miami (OH) | | – | | 1 | – | 5 | – | 0 |
| Kansas State | | – | | 1 | – | 6 | – | 0 |
| American Medical | | – | | 0 | – | 3 | – | 0 |

The 1904 Iowa State Cyclones football team represented Iowa State College of Agricultural and Mechanic Arts (later renamed Iowa State University) as an independent during the 1904 college football season. In their third season under head coach A. W. Ristine, the Cyclones compiled a 7–2 record, shut out six of nine opponents, and outscored all opponents by a combined total of 248 to 48. Preston Daniels was the team captain.

Between 1892 and 1913, the football team played on a field that later became the site of the university's Parks Library. The field was known as State Field; when the new field opened in 1914, it became known as "New State Field".

== Schedule ==
| Date | Opponent | Site | Result | Attendance | Source |
|---|---|---|---|---|---|
| October 1 | Coe | State Field; Ames, IA | W 22–0 | | |
| October 8 | Iowa State Normal | State Field; Ames, IA | W 17–0 | | |
| October 15 | at Minnesota | Northrop Field; Minneapolis, MN | L 0–32 | | |
| October 22 | Simpson | State Field; Ames, IA | W 87–0 | | |
| October 29 | at Iowa | Iowa Field; Iowa City, IA (rivalry) | L 6-10 | | |
| November 5 | Grinnell | State Field; Ames, IA | W 40–0 | | |
| November 12 | Des Moines | State Field; Ames, IA | W 16–0 | | |
| November 18 | Cornell (IA) | State Field; Ames, IA | W 41–6 | | |
| November 24 | at Drake | Haskins Field; Des Moines, IA | W 19–0 | 5,000 | |
