= 1904 Wabash Little Giants football team =

American college football season

1904 Wabash Little Giants football
- Conference: Independent
- Record: 4–4
- Head coach: Frank Cayou (1st season)

1904 Midwestern college football independents records
	Conf.			Overall
Team	W	L	T	W		L		T
Saint Louis		–		10	–	0	–	0
Bethany (KS)		–		7	–	0	–	0
Northern Illinois State		–		5	–	0	–	0
Cape Girardeau Normal		–		2	–	0	–	0
Haskell		–		8	–	1	–	0
Cincinnati		–		7	–	1	–	0
Butler		–		6	–	1	–	0
Doane		–		5	–	1	–	0
Kansas		–		8	–	1	–	1
DePauw		–		8	–	2	–	0
Iowa State		–		7	–	2	–	0
Ohio Northern		–		7	–	2	–	1
Michigan State Normal		–		6	–	2	–	0
Wittenberg		–		6	–	2	–	0
Marquette		–		5	–	2	–	0
Nebraska		–		7	–	3	–	0
Detroit College		–		4	–	2	–	0
South Dakota State		–		4	–	2	–	1
Notre Dame		–		5	–	3	–	0
Iowa State Normal		–		5	–	3	–	1
Western Illinois		–		6	–	4	–	0
Heidelberg		–		6	–	4	–	1
Drake		–		5	–	4	–	0
Carthage		–		0	–	0	–	2
North Dakota Agricultural		–		3	–	3	–	0
Wabash		–		4	–	4	–	0
Fairmount		–		4	–	5	–	0
Lake Forest		–		3	–	5	–	1
Ohio Medical		–		2	–	4	–	2
Washington University		–		4	–	7	–	0
Ohio		–		2	–	4	–	1
Missouri		–		3	–	6	–	0
Mount Union		–		2	–	6	–	0
Miami (OH)		–		1	–	5	–	0
Kansas State		–		1	–	6	–	0
American Medical		–		0	–	3	–	0

The 1904 Wabash College football team was an American football team that represented Wabash College as an independent during the 1904 college football season. In Frank Cayou's first season as head coach, the team compiled a 4–4 record. This was the year Wabash adopted the Little Giants name.

== Schedule ==
Date	Opponent	Site	Result	Source
September 24	at Earlham	Richmond, IN	W 16–0	
September 28	at Illinois	Illinois Field; Champaign, IL	L 2–23	
October 1	at Notre Dame	Cartier Field; Notre Dame, IN	L 4–12	
October 15	at Purdue	Stuart Field; West Lafayette, IN	L 0–6	
October 29	Earlham	Crawfordsville, IN	W 35–0	
November 5	Indiana	Crawfordsville, IN	L 0–4	
November 12	Indianapolis	Crawfordsville, IN	W 11–0	
November 19	Butler	Crawfordsville, IN	W 51–0	
