= Dixie Fleager =

American football player and coach (1882–1971)

Biographical details
- Born: July 10, 1882; Sheldon, Illinois, U.S.
- Died: October 5, 1971 (aged 89); Seattle, Washington, U.S.

Playing career
- 1900–1903: Northwestern
- Position: Fullback

Coaching career (HC unless noted)
- 1904: Northern Illinois State Normal

Head coaching record
- Overall: 5–0

Harry Anderson "Dixie" Fleager (July 10, 1882 – October 5, 1971) was an American college football player and coach. He was the second head football coach at Northern Illinois State Normal School—now known as Northern Illinois University—in DeKalb, Illinois, serving for one season, in 1904, and compiling a record of 5–0.

== Head coaching record ==
Year	Team	Overall	Conference	Standing	Bowl/playoffs
Northern Illinois State Normal (Independent) (1904)
1904	Northern Illinois State Normal	5–0			
Northern Illinois State Normal:		5–0			
Total:		5–0			
