= A. L. Marshall =

American football coach and quarterback

Playing career
- 1900–1901: Wisconsin
- Position: Quarterback

Coaching career (HC unless noted)
- 1904–1905: North Dakota Agricultural

Head coaching record
- Overall: 4–7–1

Accomplishments and honors

Awards
- All-Western (1901)

Albert L. Marshall was an American football player and coach. He served as the head football coach at the North Dakota Agricultural College–now known as North Dakota State University–from 1904 to 1905, compiling a record of 4–7–1. Marshall played college football at the University of Wisconsin, where he was a quarterback during the 1900 and 1901 seasons.

== Head coaching record ==
Year	Team	Overall	Conference	Standing	Bowl/playoffs
North Dakota Agricultural Aggies (Independent) (1904–1905)
1904	North Dakota Agricultural	3–3			
1905	North Dakota Agricultural	1–4–1			
North Dakota Agricultural:		4–7–1			
Total:		4–7–1			
