= Doc Gamble =

American football coach

Playing career
- 1991–1992: NDSCS–Wahpeton
- 1993–1994: Tennessee–Martin
- Position: Quarterback

Coaching career (HC unless noted)
- 1995: Tennessee–Martin (SA/QB)
- 1996–1999: Withrow HS (OH) (assistant)
- 2000–2001: Mount St. Joseph (assistant)
- 2002: East Carolina (GA/LB)
- 2003–2007: Withrow HS (OH)
- 2008: Fairfield HS (OH)
- 2009–2010: Withrow HS (OH)
- 2011: Cincinnati (OA)
- 2012: Alcorn State (RB/TE/RC)
- 2013–2017: Kent State (WR)
- 2018–2019: Arkansas–Pine Bluff (AHC/QB)
- 2020–2022: Arkansas–Pine Bluff
- 2023–2024: Florida A&M (STC)
- 2025: Trine (Co-STC/RB)

Head coaching record
- Overall: 8–15 (college)

Accomplishments and honors

Championships
- 1 SWAC West Division (2020)

Charles "Doc" Gamble is an American college football coach. He most recently served as the co-special teams coordinator and running backs coach for Trine University, positions he held in 2025. Gamble served as the head football coach at the University of Arkansas at Pine Bluff from 2020 until midway through the 2022 season.

== Coaching career ==
=== High school ===
Gamble had a successful run as a high school coach at both Withrow High School in Cincinnati and Fairfield High School in Fairfield, Ohio. He compiled a 53–19 record, sent 120 of his players onto college football and in 2004 won the Paul Brown Excellence in Coaching Award.

=== Early college jobs ===
Gamble started his coaching career at his alma mater, Tennessee Martin. Gamble was an assistant coach at Mount St. Joseph University. Spent time as a graduate assistant while helping with linebackers at East Carolina. Gamble also was an offensive assistant at Cincinnati. Gamble wore many hats at Alcorn State where he coached running backs and tight ends and was the recruiting coordinator.

=== Kent State ===
Gamble coached the wide receivers at Kent State University for five seasons. He coached Dri Archer and several other all-conference wide receivers at Kent State.

=== Arkansas–Pine Bluff ===
Gamble spent two seasons as associate head coach and quarterbacks coach at the University of Arkansas at Pine Bluff. In 2019, Arkansas–Pine Bluff finished second in the Southwestern Athletic Conference (SWAC) in passing yards. After head coach Cedric Thomas left for Southern Miss, Gamble was promoted to interim head coach. On April 23, 2020, Gamble was named the 21st head football coach in Arkansas–Pine Bluff history. Gamble was relieved of his duties midway through to 2022 season, after a 4-14 stretch.

=== Florida A&M ===
In July 2023, it was announced that Willie Simmons' 2023 staff at Florida A&M had been finalized and it included Gamble as the special teams coordinator.

=== Trine ===
After two years at Florida A&M, it was announced that Gamble would join the staff at Trine University as the co-special teams coordinator and running backs coach for the 2025 season.

== Head coaching record ==
=== College ===
Year	Team	Overall	Conference	Standing	Bowl/playoffs	Coaches^{#}	STATS^{°}
Arkansas–Pine Bluff Golden Lions (Southwestern Athletic Conference) (2020–2022)
2020–21	Arkansas–Pine Bluff	4–1	4–0	1st (West)		25	24
2021	Arkansas–Pine Bluff	2–9	1–7	6th (West)			
2022	Arkansas–Pine Bluff	2–5 (Note: Gamble served as Arkansas–Pine Bluff's head coach for the first seven games of the season before he was fired on October 20. Don Treadwell was appointed interim head coach for the remainder of the season. Arkansas–Pine Bluff finished the year with an overall record of 3–8 and a mark of 1–7 in conference play, placing last out of six teams in the West Division of the Southwestern Athletic Conference.)	0–4	(West)			
Arkansas–Pine Bluff:		8–15	5–11				
Total:		8–15					
