= 1904 Kansas State Aggies football team =

American college football season

1904 Kansas State Aggies football
- Conference: Independent
- Record: 1–6
- Head coach: Reuben F. Booth (1st season)

1904 Midwestern college football independents records
	Conf.			Overall
Team	W	L	T	W		L		T
Saint Louis		–		10	–	0	–	0
Bethany (KS)		–		7	–	0	–	0
Northern Illinois State		–		5	–	0	–	0
Cape Girardeau Normal		–		2	–	0	–	0
Haskell		–		8	–	1	–	0
Cincinnati		–		7	–	1	–	0
Butler		–		6	–	1	–	0
Doane		–		5	–	1	–	0
Kansas		–		8	–	1	–	1
DePauw		–		8	–	2	–	0
Iowa State		–		7	–	2	–	0
Ohio Northern		–		7	–	2	–	1
Michigan State Normal		–		6	–	2	–	0
Wittenberg		–		6	–	2	–	0
Marquette		–		5	–	2	–	0
Nebraska		–		7	–	3	–	0
Detroit College		–		4	–	2	–	0
South Dakota State		–		4	–	2	–	1
Notre Dame		–		5	–	3	–	0
Iowa State Normal		–		5	–	3	–	1
Western Illinois		–		6	–	4	–	0
Heidelberg		–		6	–	4	–	1
Drake		–		5	–	4	–	0
Carthage		–		0	–	0	–	2
North Dakota Agricultural		–		3	–	3	–	0
Wabash		–		4	–	4	–	0
Fairmount		–		4	–	5	–	0
Lake Forest		–		3	–	5	–	1
Ohio Medical		–		2	–	4	–	2
Washington University		–		4	–	7	–	0
Ohio		–		2	–	4	–	1
Missouri		–		3	–	6	–	0
Mount Union		–		2	–	6	–	0
Miami (OH)		–		1	–	5	–	0
Kansas State		–		1	–	6	–	0
American Medical		–		0	–	3	–	0

The 1904 Kansas State Aggies football team represented Kansas State Agricultural College during the 1904 college football season.

== Schedule ==
Date	Opponent	Site	Result	Source
October 8	Fort Riley	Manhattan, KS	W 28–0	
October 22	at Saint Mary (KS)	Leavenworth, KS	L 5–10	
October 28	Bethany (KS)	Manhattan, KS	L 5–28	
October 31	Kansas State Normal West	Manhattan, KS	L 0–17	
November 12	at Washburn	Topeka, KS	L 0–56	
November 18	Kansas	Manhattan, KS (rivalry)	L 4–41	
November 20	at Kansas State Normal	Emporia, KS	L 6–34	
