= 1904 Miami Redskins football team =

American college football season

1904 Miami Redskins football
- Conference: Independent
- Record: 1–5
- Head coach: Arthur Smith (1st season)
- Home stadium: Miami Field

1904 Midwestern college football independents records
	Conf.			Overall
Team	W	L	T	W		L		T
Saint Louis		–		10	–	0	–	0
Bethany (KS)		–		7	–	0	–	0
Northern Illinois State		–		5	–	0	–	0
Cape Girardeau Normal		–		2	–	0	–	0
Haskell		–		8	–	1	–	0
Cincinnati		–		7	–	1	–	0
Butler		–		6	–	1	–	0
Doane		–		5	–	1	–	0
Kansas		–		8	–	1	–	1
DePauw		–		8	–	2	–	0
Iowa State		–		7	–	2	–	0
Ohio Northern		–		7	–	2	–	1
Michigan State Normal		–		6	–	2	–	0
Wittenberg		–		6	–	2	–	0
Marquette		–		5	–	2	–	0
Nebraska		–		7	–	3	–	0
Detroit College		–		4	–	2	–	0
South Dakota State		–		4	–	2	–	1
Notre Dame		–		5	–	3	–	0
Iowa State Normal		–		5	–	3	–	1
Western Illinois		–		6	–	4	–	0
Heidelberg		–		6	–	4	–	1
Drake		–		5	–	4	–	0
Carthage		–		0	–	0	–	2
North Dakota Agricultural		–		3	–	3	–	0
Wabash		–		4	–	4	–	0
Fairmount		–		4	–	5	–	0
Lake Forest		–		3	–	5	–	1
Ohio Medical		–		2	–	4	–	2
Washington University		–		4	–	7	–	0
Ohio		–		2	–	4	–	1
Missouri		–		3	–	6	–	0
Mount Union		–		2	–	6	–	0
Miami (OH)		–		1	–	5	–	0
Kansas State		–		1	–	6	–	0
American Medical		–		0	–	3	–	0

The 1904 Miami Redskins football team was an American football team that represented Miami University during the 1904 college football season. Under new head coach Arthur Smith, Miami compiled a 1–5 record, being outscored 12–283.

== Schedule ==
Date	Opponent	Site	Result	Attendance	Source
October 1	at Ohio State	Ohio Field; Columbus, OH	L 0–80		
October 8	Hamilton Athletic Club	Miami Field; Oxford, OH	W 12–6		
October 15	at Cincinnati	League Park; Cincinnati, OH (Victory Bell)	L 0–46	1,400	
October 22	Butler	Miami Field; Oxford, OH	L 0–32		
October 29	at Indiana Medical College		L 0–51		
November 5	at Wittenberg	Springfield, OH	L 0–68		
