= 1904 Nebraska Cornhuskers football team =

American college football season

1904 Nebraska Cornhuskers football
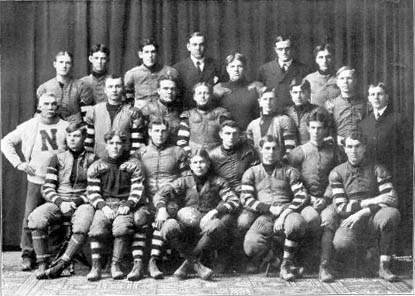

Nebraska state champion
- Conference: Independent
- Record: 7–3
- Head coach: Walter C. Booth (5th season)
- Home stadium: Antelope Field

1904 Midwestern college football independents records
	Conf.			Overall
Team	W	L	T	W		L		T
Saint Louis		–		10	–	0	–	0
Bethany (KS)		–		7	–	0	–	0
Northern Illinois State		–		5	–	0	–	0
Cape Girardeau Normal		–		2	–	0	–	0
Haskell		–		8	–	1	–	0
Cincinnati		–		7	–	1	–	0
Butler		–		6	–	1	–	0
Doane		–		5	–	1	–	0
Kansas		–		8	–	1	–	1
DePauw		–		8	–	2	–	0
Iowa State		–		7	–	2	–	0
Ohio Northern		–		7	–	2	–	1
Michigan State Normal		–		6	–	2	–	0
Wittenberg		–		6	–	2	–	0
Marquette		–		5	–	2	–	0
Nebraska		–		7	–	3	–	0
Detroit College		–		4	–	2	–	0
South Dakota State		–		4	–	2	–	1
Notre Dame		–		5	–	3	–	0
Iowa State Normal		–		5	–	3	–	1
Western Illinois		–		6	–	4	–	0
Heidelberg		–		6	–	4	–	1
Drake		–		5	–	4	–	0
Carthage		–		0	–	0	–	2
North Dakota Agricultural		–		3	–	3	–	0
Wabash		–		4	–	4	–	0
Fairmount		–		4	–	5	–	0
Lake Forest		–		3	–	5	–	1
Ohio Medical		–		2	–	4	–	2
Washington University		–		4	–	7	–	0
Ohio		–		2	–	4	–	1
Missouri		–		3	–	6	–	0
Mount Union		–		2	–	6	–	0
Miami (OH)		–		1	–	5	–	0
Kansas State		–		1	–	6	–	0
American Medical		–		0	–	3	–	0

The 1904 Nebraska Cornhuskers football team represented the University of Nebraska as an independent during the 1904 college football season. Led by fifth-year head coach Walter C. Booth, the Cornhuskers compiled a record of 7–3, excluding two exhibition games. The team played home games at Antelope Field in Lincoln, Nebraska

Nebraska entered 1904 on a 24-game winning streak, a stretch that included undefeated seasons in 1902 and 1903. The Cornhuskers extended the winning streak to 27 games before losing to Colorado on October 8.

== Schedule ==
Date	Time	Opponent	Site	Result	Attendance	Source
September 24		Grand Island	Antelope Field; Lincoln, NE	W 72–0		
September 27		Lincoln High School	Antelope Field; Lincoln, NE	W 17–0 (exhibition)		
October 1		Grinnell	Antelope Field; Lincoln, NE	W 46–0		
October 8		at Colorado	Gamble Field; Boulder, CO (rivalry)	L 0–6		
October 15		at Creighton	Vinton Street Park; Omaha, NE	W 39–0		
October 20		Lincoln Medics	Antelope Field; Lincoln, NE	W 29–0 (exhibition)		
October 22		Knox	Antelope Field; Lincoln, NE	W 34–0		
October 29		at Minnesota	Northrop Field; Minneapolis, MN (rivalry)	L 12–16	12,000	
November 5	3:00 p.m.	Iowa	Antelope Field; Lincoln, NE (rivalry)	W 17–6		
November 12	2:37 p.m.	vs. Haskell	Association Park; Kansas City, MO	L 6–14	3,000	
November 19		Bellevue (Note: Now-defunct Bellevue College, not to be confused with present-day's Bellevue University)	Antelope Field; Lincoln, NE	W 51–0		
November 24		Illinois	Antelope Field; Lincoln, NE	W 16–10		

== Coaching staff ==
Coach	Position	First year	Alma mater
Walter C. Booth	Head coach	1900	Princeton
John Westover	Assistant coach	1904	Nebraska
Jack Best	Trainer	1890	Nebraska

== Roster ==
Barta, Frank G
Barwick, Leonard QB
Bell, Johnny HB
Bender, Johnny HB
Benedict, Maurice QB
Berry E
Borg, Charles C
Burns, Donald RT
Cotton, Charles RT
Craig, Hugh HB
Denslow, Lloyd E
Eager, Earl HB
Fenlon HB
Hunter, Fred RG
Johnson, William E
Knapp QB
Lundin, Alford LT
Marsh, Earl HB
Mason, Cyrus LT
Mason, John FB
McDonald, Gil QB
Mills, Leslie G
Reddick QB
Richardson LT
Robinson E
Ryan E
Scallon LT
Speer RG
Standeven E
Weller, John HB

== Game summaries ==
=== Grand Island ===
Grand Island at Nebraska

Team	1	2	Total
Grand Island			0
• Nebraska			72

- Date: September 24
- Location: Antelope Field, Lincoln, NE

Despite playing its starters only in the second half, Nebraska beat Grand Island 72–0 in the second-largest victory in school history.

=== Lincoln High ===
Lincoln High at Nebraska

Team	1	2	Total
Lincoln High			0
• Nebraska			17

- Date: September 27
- Location: Antelope Field, Lincoln, NE

Nebraska shut out Lincoln High in a pre-season exhibition game.

=== Grinnell ===
Grinnell at Nebraska

Team	1	2	Total
Grinnell			0
• Nebraska			46

- Date: October 1
- Location: Antelope Field, Lincoln, NE

On a rainy, muddy day in Lincoln, Nebraska registered its fifth consecutive shutout victory.

=== At Colorado ===
Nebraska at Colorado

Team	1	2	Total
Nebraska	0	0	0
• Colorado	6	0	6

- Date: October 8
- Location: Gamble Field, Boulder, CO

Colorado became the first team to shut out Nebraska in four years, ending the Cornhuskers' winning streak at 27 games. NU had three opportunities inside of CU's 10-yard line, but failed to score on any of them, and Colorado defeated Nebraska for the first time.

=== At Creighton ===
Nebraska at Creighton

Team	1	2	Total
• Nebraska			39
Creighton			0

- Date: October 15
- Location: Omaha, NE

=== Lincoln Medics ===
Lincoln Medics at Nebraska

Team	1	2	Total
Lincoln Medics			0
• Nebraska			29

- Date: October 20
- Location: Antelope Field, Lincoln, NE

Nebraska defeated the Lincoln Medics 29–0 in an exhibition game that was the only meeting between the schools.

=== Knox ===
Knox at Nebraska

Team	1	2	Total
Knox			0
• Nebraska			34

- Date: October 22
- Location: Antelope Field, Lincoln, NE

Despite just one day off since scrimmaging the Lincoln Medics, NU shut out Knox 34–0.

=== At Minnesota ===
Nebraska at Minnesota

Team	1	2	Total
Nebraska			12
• Minnesota			16

- Date: October 29
- Location: Northrop Field, Minneapolis, MN
- Game attendance: 12,000

After a one-year break, NU's series with Minnesota resumed in Minneapolis. The Gophers scored first, but Nebraska tied the game shortly afterward, the first time a team scored against Minnesota in 12 games. A late Minnesota touchdown gave the Gophers a 16–12 victory.

=== Iowa ===
Iowa at Nebraska

Team	1	2	Total
Iowa			6
• Nebraska			17

- Date: November 5
- Location: Antelope Field, Lincoln, NE

=== Haskell ===
Nebraska vs. Haskell

Team	1	2	Total
Nebraska	3	3	6
• Haskell	14	0	14

- Date: November 12
- Location: Kansas City, MO

Nebraska's only points in an upset loss came after recovering a Haskell fumble in the end zone.

=== Bellevue ===
Bellevue at Nebraska

Team	1	2	Total
Bellevue			0
• Nebraska			51

- Date: November 19
- Location: Antelope Field, Lincoln, NE

=== Illinois ===
Illinois at Nebraska

Team	1	2	Total
Illinois			10
• Nebraska			16

- Date: November 24
- Location: Antelope Field, Lincoln, NE

NU faced Illinois to end the season for the second consecutive year. Illinois took an early lead and never let Nebraska take control of the game, but the Cornhuskers held on to win 16–10.
