= 1904 Saint Louis Blue and White football team =

American college football season

1904 Saint Louis Blue and White football
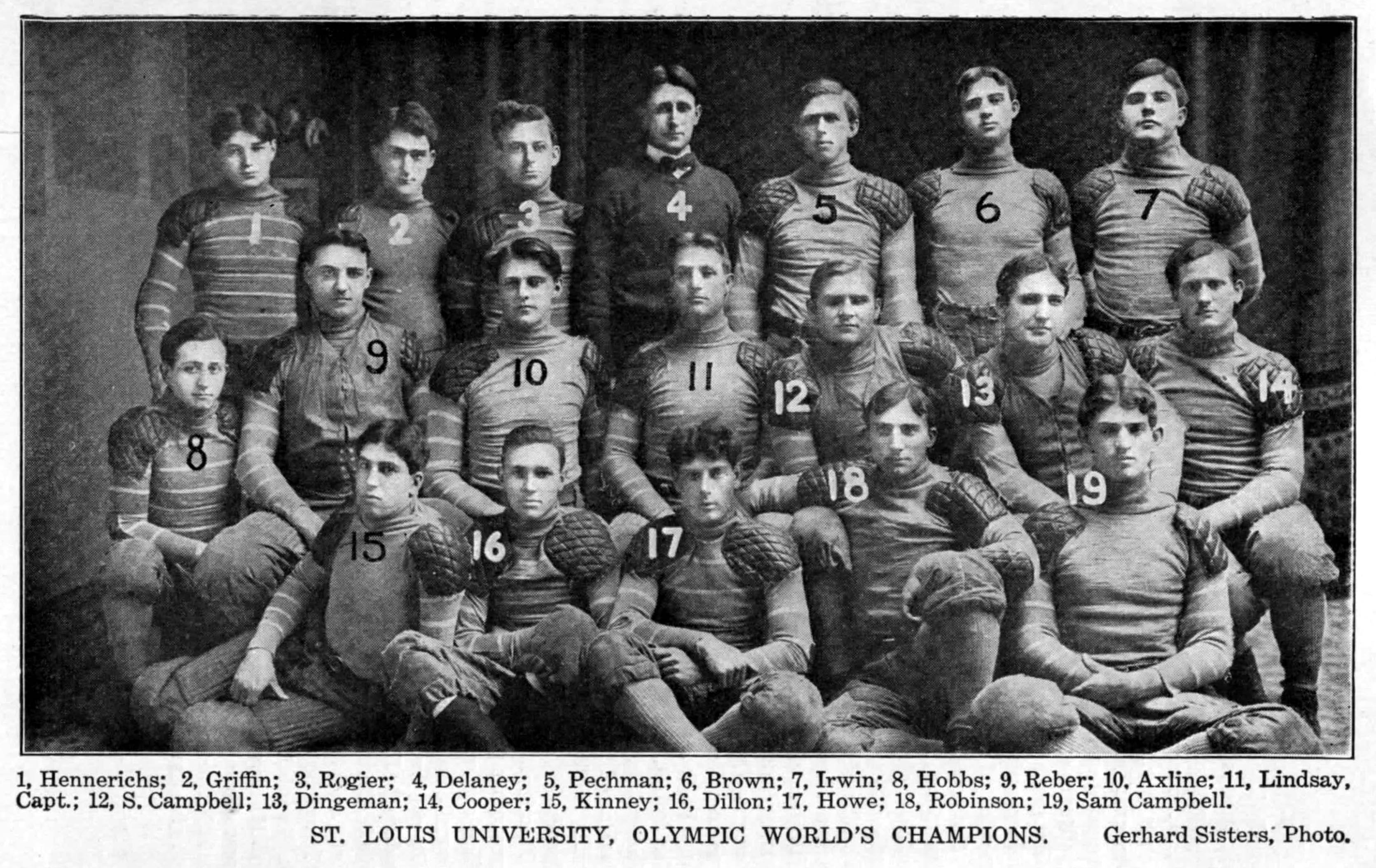
- Conference: Independent
- Record: 10–0
- Head coach: Martin Delaney (6th season)
- Home stadium: Handlan's Park, Sportsman's Park, World's Fair Stadium

1904 Midwestern college football independents records
| | Conf. | | | Overall |
| Team | W | L | T | W | | L | | T |
|---|---|---|---|---|---|---|---|---|
| Saint Louis | | – | | 10 | – | 0 | – | 0 |
| Bethany (KS) | | – | | 7 | – | 0 | – | 0 |
| Northern Illinois State | | – | | 5 | – | 0 | – | 0 |
| Cape Girardeau Normal | | – | | 2 | – | 0 | – | 0 |
| Haskell | | – | | 8 | – | 1 | – | 0 |
| Cincinnati | | – | | 7 | – | 1 | – | 0 |
| Butler | | – | | 6 | – | 1 | – | 0 |
| Doane | | – | | 5 | – | 1 | – | 0 |
| Kansas | | – | | 8 | – | 1 | – | 1 |
| DePauw | | – | | 8 | – | 2 | – | 0 |
| Iowa State | | – | | 7 | – | 2 | – | 0 |
| Ohio Northern | | – | | 7 | – | 2 | – | 1 |
| Michigan State Normal | | – | | 6 | – | 2 | – | 0 |
| Wittenberg | | – | | 6 | – | 2 | – | 0 |
| Marquette | | – | | 5 | – | 2 | – | 0 |
| Nebraska | | – | | 7 | – | 3 | – | 0 |
| Detroit College | | – | | 4 | – | 2 | – | 0 |
| South Dakota State | | – | | 4 | – | 2 | – | 1 |
| Notre Dame | | – | | 5 | – | 3 | – | 0 |
| Iowa State Normal | | – | | 5 | – | 3 | – | 1 |
| Western Illinois | | – | | 6 | – | 4 | – | 0 |
| Heidelberg | | – | | 6 | – | 4 | – | 1 |
| Drake | | – | | 5 | – | 4 | – | 0 |
| Carthage | | – | | 0 | – | 0 | – | 2 |
| North Dakota Agricultural | | – | | 3 | – | 3 | – | 0 |
| Wabash | | – | | 4 | – | 4 | – | 0 |
| Fairmount | | – | | 4 | – | 5 | – | 0 |
| Lake Forest | | – | | 3 | – | 5 | – | 1 |
| Ohio Medical | | – | | 2 | – | 4 | – | 2 |
| Washington University | | – | | 4 | – | 7 | – | 0 |
| Ohio | | – | | 2 | – | 4 | – | 1 |
| Missouri | | – | | 3 | – | 6 | – | 0 |
| Mount Union | | – | | 2 | – | 6 | – | 0 |
| Miami (OH) | | – | | 1 | – | 5 | – | 0 |
| Kansas State | | – | | 1 | – | 6 | – | 0 |
| American Medical | | – | | 0 | – | 3 | – | 0 |

The 1904 Saint Louis Blue and White football team was an American football team that represented Saint Louis University as an independent during the 1904 college football season. In their sixth and final season under head coach Martin Delaney, the Blue and White compiled an 10–0 record and were not scored upon all season. The team played nine of its ten games in its home city of St Louis, at three different venues: one game at Handlan's Park, four at Sportsman's Park, and four at the newly-opened World's Fair Stadium—now known as Francis Olympic Field—on the grounds of the Louisiana Purchase Exposition, also known as the St. Louis World's Fair. The stadium also hosted the 1904 Summer Olympics.

== Schedule ==
| Date | Time | Opponent | Site | Result | Source |
|---|---|---|---|---|---|
| October 1 | | Tarkio | Handlan's Park; St. Louis, MO | W 6–0 | |
| October 8 | 3:30 p.m. | Illinois College | Sportsman's Park; St. Louis, MO | W 26–0 | |
| October 15 | | Warrensburg Teachers | Sportsman's Park; St. Louis, MO | W 12–0 | |
| October 18 | 3:00 p.m. | Kemper | World's Fair Stadium; St. Louis, MO | W 12–0 | |
| October 20 | 2:30 p.m. | Kentucky University | World's Fair Stadium; St. Louis, MO | W 5–0 | |
| October 24 | 2:30 p.m. | St. Louis Central High School | World's Fair Stadium; St. Louis, MO | W 45–0 | |
| October 31 | | Wentworth | World's Fair Stadium; St. Louis, MO | W 58–0 | |
| November 12 | | at Missouri | Rollins Field; Columbia, MO | W 17–0 | |
| November 19 | | Arkansas | Sportsman's Park; St. Louis, MO | W 51–0 | |
| November 24 | | Rush Medical | Sportsman's Park; St. Louis, MO | W 47–0 | |
