= Arthur Smith (American football, early 1900s) =

American football player and coach

Playing career
- 1901–1902: Dartmouth
- Positions: Tackle, fullback, halfback

Coaching career (HC unless noted)
- 1903: Army (assistant)
- 1904: Miami (OH)

Head coaching record
- Overall: 1–5 (.167)

Arthur K. Smith was an American college football player and coach in the early 1900s. He was a 1903 graduate of Dartmouth College where he played football. In 1904, he served as head football coach of Miami University in Oxford, Ohio, compiling a record of 1–5.

== Playing career ==
Smith lettered in football in 1901 and 1902 at Dartmouth under coach Walter McCornack. Smith helped the 1901 Dartmouth eleven to a 9–1 record with the only loss coming to national power Harvard. This team was captained by John O'Connor and outscored its opponents 267 to 46. The 1902 team that included third-team Walter Camp All-American, Allen Farmer at end and future Miami University coach Amos Foster. They finished the season 6–2–1 with losses to Amherst and Harvard.

== Coaching career ==
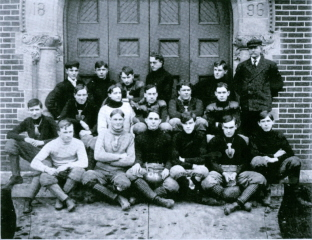
1904 Miami University varsity football team coached by A. K. Smith

Smith was head football coach at Miami University in Oxford, Ohio for the 1904 season and led them to a 1–5 record. After a disappointing 1903 season, the Board of Control of Athletics was looking to hire a coach that could offer "systematic training" of the team to hopefully lead to a more successful season. In the spring, the Board hired Smith who was doing some coaching at West Point in 1903. Before the season, the team elected C. M. Morphy as captain and the team's manager, J. Blickensderfer, had scheduled games versus Ohio State, Wittenberg, Franklin, Earlham College, the Indianapolis Medics, and DePauw. The manager also had scheduled a game with Central University in Danville, Kentucky, but that game was canceled due to financial dispute from the baseball game from the spring. Smith's Miami team was out scored for the season by a combined score 283 to 12. All of the losses were shutouts including and 80–loss to Ohio State and a 68–0 loss to Wittenberg. The only game in which Miami scored was a 12–6 victory over the Hamilton Athletic Club in the second game of the season.

== Head coaching record ==
Year	Team	Overall	Conference	Standing	Bowl/playoffs
Miami Redskins (Independent) (1904)
1904	Miami	1–5			
Miami:		1–5			
Total:		1–5			
