= 2013 Miami RedHawks football team =

American college football season

2013 Miami RedHawks football
- Conference: Mid-American Conference
- East Division
- Record: 0–12 (0–8 MAC)
- Head coach: Don Treadwell (3rd season; first 5 games); Mike Bath (interim; final 7 games)
- Offensive coordinator: John Klacik (2nd season; first 5 games); Mike Bath (interim; final 7 games)
- Offensive scheme: Multiple
- Defensive coordinator: Jay Peterson (2nd season)
- Base defense: 4–3
- Home stadium: Yager Stadium

2013 Mid-American Conference football standings
	Conf.			Overall
Team	W		L	W		L
East Division
Bowling Green x$	7	–	1	10	–	4
Buffalo	6	–	2	8	–	5
Ohio	4	–	4	7	–	6
Akron	4	–	4	5	–	7
Kent State	3	–	5	4	–	8
UMass	1	–	7	1	–	11
Miami (OH)	0	–	8	0	–	12
West Division
Northern Illinois x	8	–	0	12	–	2
Ball State	7	–	1	10	–	3
Toledo	5	–	3	7	–	5
Central Michigan	5	–	3	6	–	6
Eastern Michigan	1	–	7	2	–	10
Western Michigan	1	–	7	1	–	11
Championship: Bowling Green 47, Northern Illinois 27
$ – Conference champion; x – Division champion/co-champions

The 2013 Miami RedHawks football team represented Miami University in the 2013 NCAA Division I FBS football season and finished the season with an 0–12 record. They were led by head coach Don Treadwell for the first five then led by interim head coach Mike Bath of their final seven games. They played their home games at Yager Stadium and competed as a member of the East Division of the Mid-American Conference.

After opening the season 0–5, head coach Don Treadwell was fired and Mike Bath was named interim head coach. Over his tenure as head coach, Treadwell compiled a record of 8–21 since he was hired in 2011.

== Schedule ==
Date	Time	Opponent	Site	TV	Result	Attendance
August 31	7:00 p.m.	at Marshall*	Joan C. Edwards Stadium; Huntington, WV	CBSSN	L 14–52	27,148
September 7	12:00 p.m.	at Kentucky*	Commonwealth Stadium; Lexington, KY	SECRN	L 7–41	54,846
September 21	4:00 p.m.	Cincinnati*	Yager Stadium; Oxford, OH (Victory Bell)	ESPN3	L 0–14	21,586
September 28	12:00 p.m.	at Illinois*	Memorial Stadium; Champaign, IL	BTN	L 14–50	46,890
October 5	1:00 p.m.	Central Michigan	Yager Stadium; Oxford, OH	ESPN3	L 9–21	22,750
October 12	3:00 p.m.	at Massachusetts	Gillette Stadium; Foxborough, MA	ESPN3	L 10–17	21,707
October 19	1:00 p.m.	Akron^{†}	Yager Stadium; Oxford, OH	ESPN3	L 17–24	15,164
October 26	2:00 p.m.	at Ohio	Peden Stadium; Athens, OH (Battle of the Bricks)	ESPN3	L 16–41	21,638
November 5	8:00 p.m.	Bowling Green	Yager Stadium; Oxford, OH	ESPNU	L 3–45	10,598
November 13	8:00 p.m.	at Kent State	Dix Stadium; Kent, OH	ESPNU	L 6–24	8,573
November 19	8:00 p.m.	Buffalo	Yager Stadium; Oxford, OH	ESPNU	L 7–44	9,895
November 29	1:00 p.m.	at Ball State	Scheumann Stadium; Muncie, IN	ESPN3	L 14–55	6,784
*Non-conference game; ^{†}Homecoming; All times are in Eastern time
