= Mike Bath =

American football player and coach (born 1977)

Biographical details
- Born: September 11, 1977 (age 49); Celina, Ohio, U.S.

Playing career
- 1997–2000: Miami (OH)
- Position: Quarterback

Coaching career (HC unless noted)
- 2004–2005: Miami (OH) (GA)
- 2006–2008: Miami (OH) (TE)
- 2009–2010: Ashland (OC/QB/WR)
- 2011: Miami (OH) (WR/TE)
- 2012: Miami (OH) (QB)
- 2013: Miami (OH) (QB/WR)
- 2013: Miami (OH) (interim HC)
- 2014–2017: Wyoming (co-ST/RB/FB)
- 2018: Wyoming (co-ST/FB/TE)
- 2019–2020: Western Michigan (RB)
- 2021: Western Michigan (co-OC/RB)
- 2022–2024: Indiana State (OC/QB)

Head coaching record
- Overall: 0–7

Mike Bath (born September 11, 1977) is an American college football coach and former player. He was most recently the offensive coordinator and quarterbacks coach at Indiana State University, a position he held from 2022 to 2024. He served as interim head football coach at Miami University in Oxford, Ohio for the final seven games of the 2013 season, replacing the fired Don Treadwell. Prior to his promotion, he was in the third year of his second stint as an assistant coach with the program.

== Playing career ==
Bath played football at Miami as a quarterback from 1997 to 2000. He was a three year starter at Miami, and finished his career with 7,010 passing yards and 49 passing touchdowns.

== Coaching career ==
After a two year stint as a high school assistant coach in Celina, OH, he began his college coaching career at his alma mater in 2004, serving as a graduate assistant for two years before being elevated to a full-time position for three more. In between his two coaching stints at Miami, he was the offensive coordinator, quarterbacks, and wide receivers coach at Ashland University in Ashland, Ohio, from 2009 to 2010. Bath was an assistant coach at the University of Wyoming from 2014 to 2018 (During current Buffalo Bills starting quarterback Josh Allen's Wyoming career) and Western Michigan University from 2019 to 2021.

== Head coaching record ==
Year	Team	Overall	Conference	Standing	Bowl/playoffs
Miami RedHawks (Mid-American Conference) (2013)
2013	Miami	0–7 (Note: Don Treadwell served as Miami's head coach for the first five games of the season 2011 season before he was fired. Bath was appointed interim head coach for the remainder of the season. Miami finished the year with an overall record of 0–12 and a mark of 0–8 in conference play.)	0–7	7th (East)	
Miami:		0–7	0–7		
Total:		0–7			
