= Don Treadwell =

American football player and coach (born 1960)

Biographical details
- Born: June 10, 1960 (age 66)

Playing career
- 1978–1981: Miami (OH)
- Position: Wide receiver

Coaching career (HC unless noted)
- 1986–1990: Youngstown State (assistant)
- 1991: Youngstown State (OC)
- 1992–1993: Miami (OH) (RB/WR)
- 1994: Cincinnati (WR)
- 1995–1996: Stanford (RB)
- 1997–1998: Boston College (PGC)
- 1999: NC State (RB)
- 2000–2002: Michigan State (WR)
- 2003: Ball State (OC/WR)
- 2004–2006: Cincinnati (OC)
- 2007–2010: Michigan State (OC)
- 2010: Michigan State (acting HC)
- 2011–2013: Miami (OH)
- 2014: Kent State (RB)
- 2015–2017: Kent State (OC/QB)
- 2018–2019: Michigan State (DB/ST)
- 2020–2022: Arkansas–Pine Bluff (OC/WR)
- 2022: Arkansas–Pine Bluff (interim HC)

Head coaching record
- Overall: 9–24

Don Treadwell (born June 10, 1960) is an American college football coach and former player. He was most recently the interim head coach at University of Arkansas at Pine Bluff, having previously served as the offensive coordinator and wide receivers coach on Doc Gamble's staff. Treadwell served as the head football coach at Miami University in Oxford, Ohio from 2011 to 2013 and as the offensive coordinator at Michigan State University from 2007 to 2010. He also acted as interim head coach after Mark Dantonio suffered a heart attack during the 2010 season. However, Michigan State credits the entire season to Dantonio's record.

== Early life and playing career ==
Treadwell was born on June 10, 1960. He attended Oberlin High School in Oberlin, Ohio, where he played on the football team as a quarterback. He attended college at Miami University, where he played on the football team as a starting wide receiver from 1978 to 1981. He was named to the All-Mid-American Conference first team as a junior. He graduated from Miami with a bachelor's degree in physical education in 1982.

== Assistant coaching career ==
Treadwell began his coaching career at Youngstown State University under head coach Jim Tressel. From 1986 to 1991, he served different stints as offensive coordinator, quarterbacks, wide receivers, and running backs coach. During his time at Youngstown, Treadwell coached alongside defensive coordinator Mark Dantonio, whom he would later work for at Cincinnati and Michigan State. He also held assistant coaching positions at Miami (Ohio), Stanford, Boston College, North Carolina State, a separate stint at Michigan State, and Ball State. He returned to Michigan State University in 2007 to take over as offensive coordinator, and he employed a balanced attack. After head coach Mark Dantonio suffered a heart attack on September 19, 2010, Treadwell filled in during the interim. He led Michigan State to victories over Northern Colorado and 11th-ranked Wisconsin. After the win over the Badgers, Rivals.com named Treadwell the National Coordinator of the Week. On January 22, 2018, Treadwell returned for a third stint at Michigan State University, this time as the defensive backs coach, special teams coordinator, and also as an offensive consultant. On October 8, 2020, it was announced that Treadwell would reunite with Doc Gamble, whom he worked with at Kent State. He is currently the offensive coordinator and wide receivers coach for Gamble at Arkansas-Pine Bluff.

== Head coaching career ==
On December 31, 2010, Miami University hired Treadwell as its head football coach. He was fired on October 6, 2013.

== Head coaching record ==
Year	Team	Overall	Conference	Standing	Bowl/playoffs	Rank^{#}
Miami RedHawks (Mid-American Conference) (2011–2013)
2011	Miami	4–8	3–5	T–4th (East)		
2012	Miami	4–8	3–5	T–4th (East)		
2013	Miami	0–5 (Note: Treadwell was fired after the first five games of the season 2011 season. Mike Bath was appointed interim head coach for the remainder of the season. Miami finished the year with an overall record of 0–12 and a mark of 0–8 in conference play, placing last out of seven teams in the Mid-American Conference's East Division.)	0–1			
Miami:		8–21	6–11			
Arkansas–Pine Bluff Golden Lions (Southwestern Athletic Conference) (2022)
2022	Arkansas–Pine Bluff	1–3 (Note: Doc Gamble served as Arkansas–Pine Bluff's head coach for the first seven games of the season before he was fired on October 20. Treadwell was appointed interim head coach for the remainder of the season. Arkansas–Pine Bluff finished the year with an overall record of 3–8 and a mark of 1–7 in conference play.)	1–3	6th (West)		
Arkansas–Pine Bluff:		1–3	1–3			
Total:		9–24				
