= Herbert J. McIntire =

American football coach

- McIntire, c. 1903

Biographical details
- Born: April 6, 1875; Springfield, Massachusetts, U.S.
- Died: June 28, 1948 (aged 73); Richmond, Virginia, U.S.
- Education: Springfield College (1897)

Playing career
- 1895: Roanoke

Coaching career (HC unless noted)
- 1895: Roanoke
- 1897: Miami (OH)
- 1899: Roanoke
- 1899–1900: DePauw

Head coaching record
- Overall: 9–12–3

Herbert Jerome McIntire (April 6, 1875 – June 28, 1948) was an American college football coach in the late 19th century. He served as the head football coach at Miami University in Oxford, Ohio for one season, in 1897, and at Depauw University in Greencastle, Indiana for to seasons, from 1899 to 1900, compiling a career college football coaching record of 9–12–3.

== Early life ==
McIntire was born in Springfield, Massachusetts to parents of German and Dutch descent. He attended the International Young Men's Christian Association Training School (now known as Springfield College), where he studied physical education as a member of the Class of 1895. He left this college for two years and attend Roanoke College in Salem, Virginia, where he served as a player-coach on the 1895 football squad. He returned to YMCA Training School and graduated in 1897.

== Coaching career ==
In 1897, while an instructor of physical education, McIntire became the third paid coach at Miami University in Oxford, Ohio. In his only year as coach, McIntire posted a record of 2–4–1 with victories over the Nashville Guards and Earlham College. McIntire became the first paid coach to leave Miami with a losing record. After he left, Miami did not hire a football coach for two seasons until Alonzo Edwin Branch was hired for the 1900 season.

After leaving Miami, McIntire went to DePauw University in Greencastle, Indiana, where he was an instructor of physical culture and coached the school's football team. He coached for two seasons from 1899 to 1900, where he had a record of 7–8–2. During the 1899 season McIntire split head coaching duties with Jules H. Ford, having previously been slated as the head coach at Roanoke College. That year, the DePauw team finished 4–5 with a 1–3 record in which McIntire was head coach. In 1900, McIntire became the sole head coach of the and finished with a 6–5–2 record. During the 1900s season, McIntire's DePauw team split the two games with rival Wabash College. Earlier in the season, Wabash coach Anthony Chez was able to gain knowledge of DePauw's plays and strategies by pretending to be a Newspaper reporter. Because McIntire and DePauw thought he was a journalist, Chez was permitted to sit on the bench for one of DePauw's games where he gained insight that later helped Wabash to beat DePauw by a score of 6–0. Several weeks later, DePauw adjusted its strategy and was able to win the second game that season between the two schools by a score of 26–11. The following year McIntire left DePauw and was replaced by the coach that tricked him, Chez.

== Later life ==
In 1901, McIntire left his position at DePauw and joined the faculty at Virginia Polytechnic Institute as an instructor of physical education. The following year he joined the faculty at Washington State University in Pullman, Washington, as the physical director.

McIntire later practiced as an optometrist in Virginia for 35 years. He died on June 28, 1948, at his home in Richmond, Virginia.

== Head coaching record ==
| Year | Team | Overall | Conference | Standing | Bowl/playoffs |
|---|---|---|---|---|---|
Miami Redskins (Independent) (1897)
| 1897 | Miami | 2–4–1 | | | |
| Miami: | | 2–4–1 | | | |
DePauw (Independent) (1899–1900)
| 1899 | DePauw | 1–3 | | | |
| 1900 | DePauw | 6–5–2 | | | |
| DePauw: | | 7–8–2 | | | |
| Total: | | 9–12–3 | | | |
