= Neil Park (Columbus, Ohio) =

Baseball park in Columbus, Ohio

Coordinates: 39°58′22.5″N 82°59′27.7″W

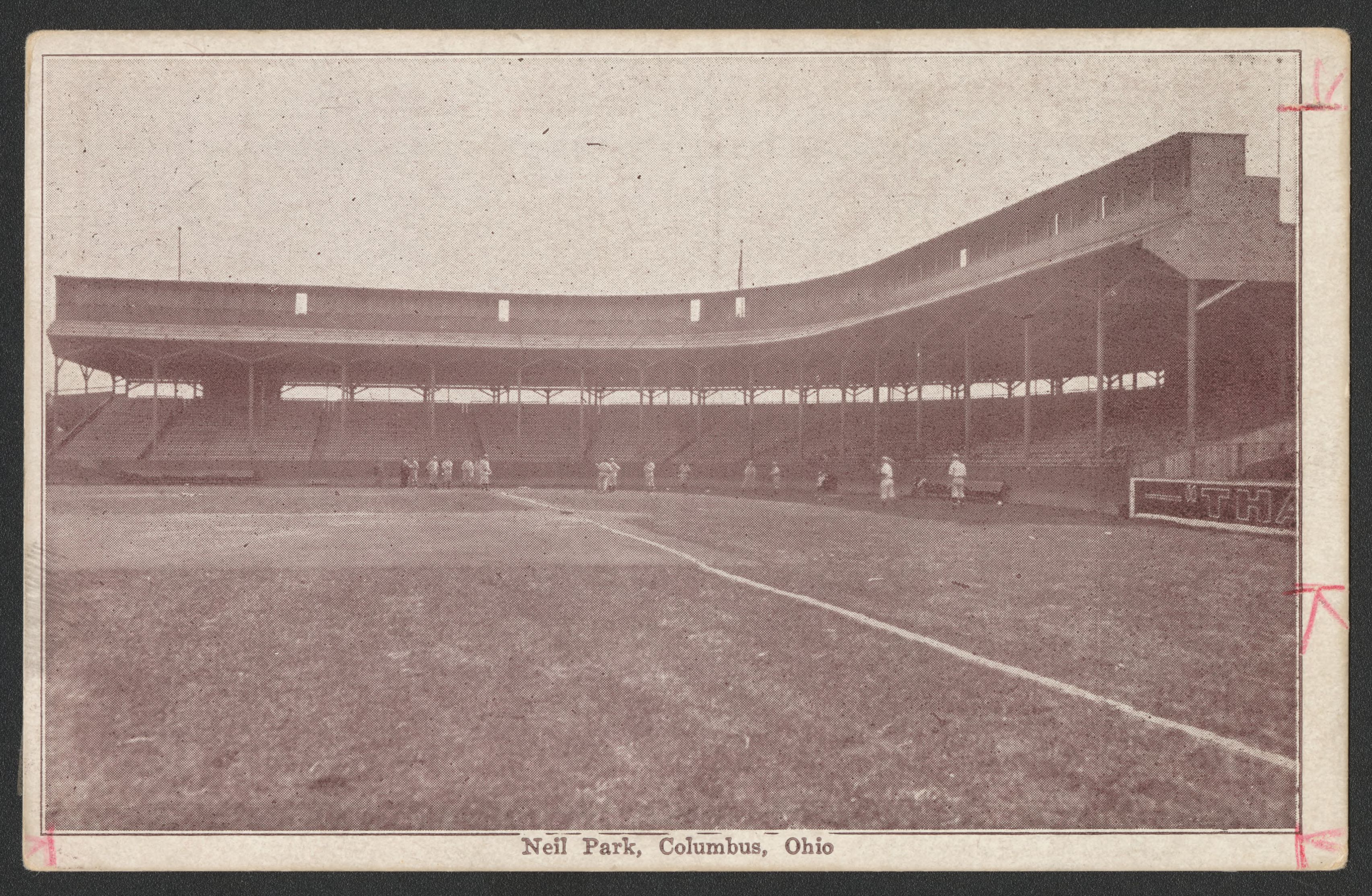
- Interactive map of Neil Park
- Address: Columbus, Ohio; U.S.
- Record attendance: 21,000

Construction
- Opened: April 15th, 1900
- Demolished: December 11th, 1946

Neil Park was a baseball park in Columbus, Ohio.

It was the home field of several Columbus Minor League Baseball teams, notably the Columbus Senators, from 1900 until it was abandoned in mid-season 1932 with the opening of Red Bird stadium and later demolished in 1946.

The park once set a minor league attendance record with 21,000 at a single game.
