= Amos Foster =

American athlete, coach, and lawyer (1880–1952)

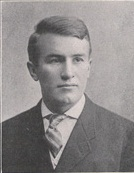
- Foster from 1907 Cornhusker

Biographical details
- Born: March 10, 1880; Keene, New Hampshire, U.S.
- Died: August 7, 1952 (aged 72); Cincinnati, Ohio, U.S.

Playing career

Football
- 1902–1903: Dartmouth

Basketball
- 1900–1903: Dartmouth
- Position: Fullback (football)

Coaching career (HC unless noted)

Football
- 1904–1905: Cincinnati
- 1906: Nebraska
- 1907–1908: Miami (OH)

Basketball
- 1904–1909: Cincinnati

Head coaching record
- Overall: 30–9 (football); 30–10 (basketball)

Accomplishments and honors

Championships
- Basketball; Ohio Collegiate (1908)

Amos Parker Foster (March 10, 1880 – August 7, 1952) was an American college football and college basketball player and coach in the early 1900s. He was a 1904 graduate of Dartmouth College where he lettered in both basketball and football. Foster served as the head football coach at the University of Cincinnati (1904–1905), the University of Nebraska (1906), and Miami University (1907–1908), compiling a career college football coaching record of 30–9. He was also the head basketball coach at Cincinnati for five seasons from 1904 to 1909, tallying a mark of 30–10. After coaching he practiced law in Ohio.

== Early life ==
Foster was born on March 10, 1880, in Keene, New Hampshire. He graduated from Cushing Academy in 1899, where he had played on several athletic teams. He spent the next year doing college preparatory work at Cushing and was a member of the graduate basketball team, which was named All-New England champion after winning in a tournament of 35 top teams.

== Playing career ==
Foster lettered in football in 1902 and 1903 for Dartmouth. He helped the 1903 team coached by Fred Folsom to a 9–1 record including the school's first-ever win over Harvard. Many of the Eastern writers named him to their All-American team for his success his last year at fullback. Foster was also a three-year letter winner for Dartmouth in basketball, lettering in 1901, 1902 and 1903. During the 1902–03 season he served as team captain and led them to a 7–9 record.

== Coaching career ==
Foster started his coaching career while still at Dartmouth, when he took a job as head basketball coach at the Bradford Academy. He held this position for two seasons.

=== Cincinnati ===
Foster was head coach at the University of Cincinnati in both football and basketball. He coached the Cincinnati football team for two seasons 1904 and 1905. In his two years as the Bearcat's head coach, he compiled an overall record of 11–4. Foster's most successful year at Cincinnati was in 1904 where he led the Bearcats to a 7–1 record. This team scored 182 points during the season and only gave up 10. Their seven wins included shutout victories over Kentucky, Tennessee, and traditional rival Miami. Foster added a 4–3 mark in 1905 before taking over the head coaching job at the University of Nebraska for the 1906 season. Foster was also the head coach of the basketball squad at Cincinnati from 1904 to 1909. In his five seasons as Bearcats' head coach he compiled an overall record of 30–10. His most successful season was in 1908 where he led the Bearcats to a 9–0 record and an Ohio Collegiate Championship. Even though Foster left Cincinnati to coach football at other schools, he still coached the Bearcats basketball team.

=== Nebraska ===
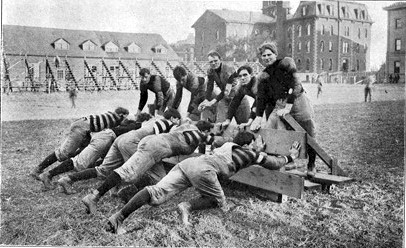
"The Charging Machine" introduced by Foster to develop line-men.

Foster replaced Walter C. Booth as head coach of the Nebraska Cornhuskers football team in 1906. He spent just one season as coach of the Cornhuskers, leading them to a 6–4 record. He was able to beat his former school, Cincinnati, by a score of 41–0.

=== Miami ===
Foster was head football coach at Miami University in Oxford, Ohio, for the 1907 and 1908 seasons. The 1908 team outscored their opponents 113–10 and went 7–0. He left Miami with a record of 13–1. His career winning percentage of .939 is the highest in Miami history ahead of College Football Hall of Fame coaches George Little, Ara Parseghian, Sid Gillman, Woody Hayes, and Bo Schembechler.

== Head coaching record ==
=== Football ===
Year	Team	Overall	Conference	Standing	Bowl/playoffs
Cincinnati (Independent) (1904–1905)
1904	Cincinnati	7–1			
1905	Cincinnati	4–3			
Cincinnati:		11–4			
Nebraska Cornhuskers (Independent) (1906)
1906	Nebraska	6–4			
Nebraska:		6–4			
Miami Redskins (Independent) (1907–1908)
1907	Miami	6–1			
1908	Miami	7–0			
Miami:		13–1			
Total:		30–9			
