= South Dakota State football, 1889–1909 =

American college football seasons

The South Dakota State Jackrabbits football program represents South Dakota State University in American football. This article covers the history of the program in the first two decades. Prior to 1904, the school was known as the South Dakota Agricultural College. In 1904, the school was renamed South Dakota State College of Agriculture and Mechanic Arts. The team played its home games at Brookings, South Dakota.

Significant milestones in the period covered include the following:

- South Dakota Agricultural began competing in intercollegiate football in 1889, eight years after the school was founded. The team played a single game against the University of South Dakota in 1889, ending in a 6–6 tie. It was the first game in the South Dakota–South Dakota State football rivalry. South Dakota State did not win a game in that rivalry until 30 years later in 1919.
- After a seven-year hiatus, the program resumed intercollegiate play in 1897 with a game against the University of Sioux Falls, ending in a 22–0 loss.
- In 1898, South Dakota Agricultural won its first football game, a 62–0 victory over a team from Watertown, South Dakota.
- The 1899 team compiled the program's first winning record of 3–1, including shut out victories over Huron College (55–0) and Madison Normal (23–0) and ending with a 57–0 loss to Mitchell University.
- In 1903, the team commenced its rivalry with North Dakota State, now known for the Dakota Marker trophy. North Dakota State won the inaugural game by an 85–0 score. It remains the worst loss in program history, followed by an 81–0 loss to Minnesota in 1905 and an 86–6 loss to Kansas in 1947.
- In 1908, the team won its first rivalry game with North Dakota State, prevailing by an 11–5 score.

Regular opponents during the first two decades included the Flandreau Indian School, the Yankton College, the Huron University, Madison Normal School (now known as Dakota State University), and Dakota University at Mitchell (now known as Dakota Wesleyan University).

== 1889 ==
1889 South Dakota Agricultural football
- Conference: Independent
- Record: 0–0–1
- Head coach: None

1889 Midwestern college football independents records
	Conf.			Overall
Team	W	L	T	W		L		T
Miami (OH)		–		4	–	0	–	0
Butler		–		2	–	0	–	0
Washington University		–		2	–	0	–	0
Iowa College		–		1	–	0	–	0
Lake Forest		–		1	–	0	–	0
Notre Dame		–		1	–	0	–	0
South Dakota		–		1	–	0	–	1
Minnesota		–		3	–	1	–	0
Purdue		–		2	–	1	–	0
South Dakota Agricultural		–		0	–	0	–	1
Northwestern		–		2	–	2	–	0
Cincinnati		–		1	–	1	–	0
Wabash		–		1	–	1	–	0
Michigan		–		1	–	2	–	0
Indiana		–		0	–	1	–	1
Iowa		–		0	–	1	–	0
Wisconsin		–		0	–	2	–	0

The 1889 South Dakota Agricultural football team represented South Dakota Agricultural College as an independent during the 1889 college football season. In their first season of existence, they played in one game, a 6–6 tie against the University of South Dakota.

=== Schedule ===
Date	Opponent	Site	Result
	South Dakota	(rivalry)	T 6–6

== 1897 ==
1897 South Dakota Agricultural football
- Conference: Independent
- Record: 0–1
- Head coach: None

1897 Midwestern college football independents records
	Conf.			Overall
Team	W	L	T	W		L		T
Butler		–		3	–	0	–	0
Fairmount		–		1	–	0	–	0
Washburn		–		7	–	1	–	0
Cincinnati		–		9	–	1	–	1
Iowa State Normal		–		5	–	1	–	0
Ohio Wesleyan		–		7	–	1	–	1
Indiana		–		6	–	1	–	1
Ohio		–		7	–	2	–	0
Carthage		–		3	–	1	–	0
Iowa Agricultural		–		3	–	1	–	0
Notre Dame		–		4	–	1	–	1
Central Michigan		–		2	–	1	–	0
Baldwin–Wallace		–		2	–	1	–	1
Chicago Dental Infirmary		–		2	–	2	–	1
Lake Forest		–		4	–	5	–	1
Drake		–		2	–	3	–	0
Heidelberg		–		2	–	3	–	0
Detroit College		–		1	–	2	–	0
Indiana Normal		–		1	–	4	–	0
Kansas State		–		1	–	2	–	1
Mount Union		–		2	–	4	–	1
Rush Medical College		–		1	–	4	–	1
DePauw		–		2	–	6	–	0
Wittenberg		–		2	–	6	–	0
Haskell		–		1	–	4	–	0
Indiana State Normal		–		1	–	4	–	0
Ohio State		–		1	–	7	–	1
Lincoln (MO)		–		0	–	1	–	0
South Dakota Agricultural		–		0	–	1	–	0
Washington University		–		0	–	2	–	0
North Dakota Agricultural		–		0	–	3	–	0

The 1897 South Dakota Agricultural football team was an American football team that represented South Dakota Agricultural College as an independent during the 1897 college football season. In their first season since 1889, they played in one game, a 22–0 loss against Sioux Falls.

=== Schedule ===
Date	Opponent	Site	Result
	Sioux Falls		L 0–22

== 1898 ==
1898 South Dakota Agricultural football
- Conference: Independent
- Record: 1–1–1
- Head coach: Bert H. Morrison (1st season)

1898 Midwestern college football independents records
	Conf.			Overall
Team	W	L	T	W		L		T
Washington University		–		6	–	0	–	0
Detroit College		–		5	–	0	–	0
Carthage		–		3	–	0	–	0
Lincoln (MO)		–		1	–	0	–	0
Iowa State Normal		–		4	–	0	–	1
Washburn		–		4	–	0	–	1
Kansas		–		7	–	1	–	0
Cincinnati		–		6	–	1	–	2
Indiana		–		4	–	1	–	2
Nebraska		–		8	–	3	–	0
Drake		–		4	–	2	–	0
Lake Forest		–		2	–	1	–	0
Notre Dame		–		4	–	2	–	0
Western Reserve		–		5	–	3	–	0
Butler		–		2	–	1	–	1
Heidelberg		–		4	–	3	–	0
Michigan Agricultural		–		4	–	3	–	0
Iowa State		–		3	–	2	–	0
Kansas State		–		1	–	1	–	2
Miami (OH)		–		1	–	1	–	0
South Dakota Agricultural		–		1	–	1	–	1
DePauw		–		3	–	4	–	2
Iowa		–		3	–	4	–	2
Ohio State		–		3	–	5	–	0
Baldwin–Wallace		–		2	–	4	–	0
Central Michigan		–		1	–	2	–	0
Indiana State Normal		–		1	–	2	–	0
North Dakota Agricultural		–		1	–	2	–	0
Wabash		–		2	–	5	–	1
Ohio Wesleyan		–		2	–	5	–	0
Ohio		–		1	–	3	–	0
Haskell		–		2	–	7	–	0
Missouri		–		1	–	4	–	1
Wittenberg		–		1	–	5	–	1
Fairmount		–		0	–	1	–	0
College of Emporia		–		0	–	2	–	0

The 1898 South Dakota Agricultural football team was an American football team that represented South Dakota Agricultural College as an independent during the 1898 college football season. In its first season under head coach Bert H. Morrison, the team compiled a 1–1–1 record.

=== Schedule ===
Date	Opponent	Site	Result	Source
	Watertown		W 62–0	
	Yankton		T 0–0	
	Sioux Falls (city)		L 6–11	

== 1899 ==
1899 South Dakota Agricultural football
- Conference: Independent
- Record: 3–1
- Head coach: Bert H. Morrison (2nd season)

1899 Midwestern college football independents records
	Conf.			Overall
Team	W	L	T	W		L		T
Kansas		–		10	–	0	–	0
North Dakota		–		6	–	0	–	0
Detroit College		–		5	–	0	–	0
Lincoln (MO)		–		1	–	0	–	0
Ohio State		–		9	–	0	–	1
Iowa		–		8	–	0	–	1
Washington University		–		5	–	1	–	0
Missouri		–		9	–	2	–	0
Chicago P&S		–		4	–	1	–	0
Mount Union		–		5	–	1	–	1
Indiana		–		6	–	2	–	0
South Dakota Agricultural		–		3	–	1	–	0
Wabash		–		1	–	0	–	1
Cincinnati		–		5	–	2	–	0
Drake		–		5	–	2	–	0
Heidelberg		–		5	–	2	–	0
Buchtel		–		2	–	1	–	0
Doane		–		2	–	1	–	0
Northern Illinois State		–		1	–	0	–	2
Notre Dame		–		6	–	3	–	1
Central Michigan		–		3	–	2	–	0
Fairmount		–		2	–	1	–	2
Carthage		–		3	–	2	–	1
Western Reserve		–		5	–	4	–	0
Wittenberg		–		5	–	4	–	0
Iowa State		–		5	–	4	–	1
College of Emporia		–		1	–	1	–	1
Ohio		–		2	–	2	–	0
Rush Medical		–		3	–	3	–	1
Ohio Wesleyan		–		5	–	5	–	0
Haskell		–		4	–	5	–	0
Lake Forest		–		4	–	6	–	2
Kansas State		–		2	–	3	–	0
Iowa State Normal		–		1	–	3	–	2
Washburn		–		2	–	5	–	2
Butler		–		1	–	3	–	0
Miami (OH)		–		1	–	5	–	0
Nebraska		–		1	–	7	–	1
North Dakota Agricultural		–		0	–	1	–	0
Baldwin–Wallace		–		0	–	4	–	0

The 1899 South Dakota Agricultural football team was an American football team that represented South Dakota Agricultural College as an independent during the 1899 college football season. In its second and final season under head coach Bert H. Morrison, the team compiled a 3–1 record.

=== Schedule ===
Date	Opponent	Site	Result	Source
	Madison Normal		W 12–5	
	Huron		W 55–0	
	Madison Normal		W 23–0	
November 20	at Mitchell	Mitchell, South Dakota	L 0–57	

== 1900 ==
1900 South Dakota Agricultural football
- Conference: Independent
- Record: 3–2
- Head coach: James Hutchinson (1st season)

1900 Midwestern college football independents records
	Conf.			Overall
Team	W	L	T	W		L		T
Central Michigan		–		1	–	0	–	0
Lake Forest		–		1	–	0	–	0
Haskell		–		9	–	1	–	0
North Dakota Agricultural		–		8	–	1	–	1
Ohio State		–		8	–	1	–	1
Nebraska		–		6	–	1	–	1
Beloit		–		7	–	1	–	2
Kirksville Osteopaths		–		7	–	2	–	1
Washburn		–		6	–	2	–	0
Wittenberg		–		5	–	2	–	1
Drake		–		6	–	3	–	0
Doane		–		2	–	1	–	0
Notre Dame		–		6	–	3	–	1
Fairmount		–		5	–	3	–	0
Detroit College		–		3	–	2	–	0
South Dakota Agricultural		–		3	–	2	–	0
Washington University		–		3	–	2	–	1
Carthage		–		4	–	3	–	0
Wabash		–		5	–	4	–	0
Lincoln (MO)		–		2	–	2	–	0
Missouri		–		4	–	4	–	1
Northern Illinois State		–		2	–	2	–	2
Iowa State Normal		–		3	–	4	–	1
Buchtel		–		2	–	3	–	1
Cincinnati		–		3	–	5	–	1
Ohio		–		2	–	4	–	1
Kansas State		–		2	–	4	–	0
Kansas		–		2	–	5	–	2
Ohio Wesleyan		–		2	–	5	–	2
Iowa State		–		2	–	5	–	1
Butler		–		0	–	1	–	3
Heidelberg		–		0	–	2	–	2
Chicago P&S		–		1	–	3	–	0
Mount Union		–		1	–	4	–	1
Miami (OH)		–		0	–	4	–	0

The 1900 South Dakota Agricultural football team was an American football team that represented South Dakota Agricultural College as an independent during the 1900 college football season. In their first and only season under head coach James Hutchinson, they compiled a 3–2 record.

=== Schedule ===
Date	Opponent	Site	Result	Source
November 3	Flandreau Indian School	S.D.A.C. athletic grounds; Brookings, SD	W 23–0	
	Yankton		W 17–0	
	Huron		W 38–0	
	Mitchell		L 5–22	
November 16	South Dakota	Athletic Park; Brookings, SD (rivalry)	L 0–17	

== 1901 ==
1901 South Dakota Agricultural football
- Conference: Independent
- Record: 3–2
- Head coach: None

1901 Midwestern college football independents records
	Conf.			Overall
Team	W	L	T	W		L		T
Saint Louis		–		10	–	0	–	0
North Dakota Agricultural		–		7	–	0	–	0
Marquette		–		4	–	0	–	1
Northern Illinois State		–		6	–	1	–	0
Notre Dame		–		8	–	1	–	1
Ohio Wesleyan		–		8	–	2	–	0
Kirksville Osteopaths		–		10	–	3	–	0
Nebraska		–		6	–	2	–	0
Ohio		–		6	–	1	–	2
Doane		–		3	–	1	–	0
Haskell		–		6	–	2	–	0
Lake Forest		–		10	–	5	–	0
Ohio State		–		5	–	3	–	1
Washington University		–		5	–	3	–	1
Ohio Medical		–		5	–	3	–	1
Iowa State Normal		–		5	–	3	–	2
South Dakota Agricultural		–		3	–	2	–	0
Beloit		–		5	–	3	–	3
Washburn		–		3	–	2	–	3
Carthage		–		1	–	1	–	0
Drake		–		4	–	4	–	0
Detroit College		–		3	–	3	–	0
Mount Union		–		5	–	5	–	1
Wittenberg		–		4	–	4	–	0
Kansas State		–		3	–	4	–	1
Iowa State		–		2	–	6	–	2
Kansas		–		3	–	5	–	2
Wabash		–		4	–	7	–	0
Fairmount		–		3	–	6	–	0
Heidelberg		–		1	–	3	–	1
Miami (OH)		–		1	–	3	–	1
Cincinnati		–		1	–	4	–	1
Case		–		2	–	7	–	0
Missouri		–		1	–	6	–	1
Butler		–		0	–	1	–	0
Chicago Eclectic Medical		–		0	–	3	–	0

The 1901 South Dakota Agricultural football team was an American football team that represented South Dakota Agricultural College as an independent during the 1901 college football season. The team compiled a 3–2 record.

=== Schedule ===
Date	Opponent	Site	Result	Source
October 19	at Huron	Huron, SD	W 38–0	
November 5	Yankton	Athletic park; Brookings, SD	W 17–0	
November 9	Flandreau Indian School	Athletic park; Brookings, SD	W 42–0	
November 21	at South Dakota	Vermillion, SD	L 0–22 (rivalry)	
November	at Mitchell	Mitchell, SD	L 5–22	

== 1902 ==
1902 South Dakota Agricultural football
- Conference: Independent
- Record: 3–2
- Head coach: L. L. Gilkey (1st season)
- Home stadium: Athletic Park

1902 Midwestern college football independents records
	Conf.			Overall
Team	W	L	T	W		L		T
Nebraska		–		9	–	0	–	0
South Dakota		–		9	–	0	–	0
North Dakota Agricultural		–		4	–	0	–	0
Central Michigan		–		4	–	0	–	0
Ohio Medical		–		9	–	1	–	0
Marquette		–		6	–	1	–	1
Knox		–		9	–	2	–	0
Northern Illinois State		–		5	–	1	–	1
Haskell		–		8	–	2	–	1
Notre Dame		–		6	–	2	–	1
Drake		–		5	–	2	–	1
Lincoln (MO)		–		2	–	1	–	0
Mount Union		–		6	–	3	–	0
Iowa State		–		6	–	3	–	1
Carthage		–		2	–	1	–	1
Cincinnati		–		4	–	2	–	2
Missouri		–		5	–	3	–	0
Miami (OH)		–		5	–	3	–	1
Kansas		–		6	–	4	–	0
South Dakota Agricultural		–		3	–	2	–	0
Fairmount		–		4	–	3	–	1
Detroit College		–		3	–	3	–	0
Lake Forest		–		4	–	4	–	1
Lincoln (MO)		–		1	–	1	–	0
Western Illinois		–		2	–	2	–	0
Wittenberg		–		3	–	4	–	2
Washburn		–		3	–	4	–	0
Doane		–		2	–	3	–	0
Heidelberg		–		3	–	5	–	1
Wabash		–		2	–	4	–	2
Buchtel		–		2	–	5	–	0
Washington University		–		2	–	6	–	1
Butler		–		1	–	3	–	0
Kansas State		–		2	–	6	–	0
Michigan State Normal		–		1	–	5	–	1
Iowa State Normal		–		1	–	6	–	1
Ohio		–		0	–	5	–	1

The 1902 South Dakota Agricultural football team was an American football team that represented South Dakota Agricultural College as an independent during the 1902 college football season. The team compiled a 3–2 record.

The team began the season with L. L. Gilkey as its coach, but he was released in late October due to the lack of funds in the Athletic Association. Gilkey then returned to his regular work purchasing chickens for the Huron Produce Co.

The 1902 football season in South Dakota witnessed the death of Harry Jordan, a young man from Sioux Falls, South Dakota, and led to the cancellation of games in that city. At the end of the season, an editorial was published in The Daily Argus-Leader from a correspondent in Britton, South Dakota, proposing a bill "to abolish football within the precincts of South Dakota." The appeal was based on the loss of life and "mutilation" during the prior football season, the loss of study time, and the game's tendency to promote "immorality", including betting, rioting, debauchery, and "the refinement of cruelty, needless senseless cruelty." The author denounced: "That so savage and barbarious a game can meet with the approval of Christian educators and ministers of the gospel in the year of our Lord 1902 is one of the amazing exhibitions of the century."

=== Schedule ===
Date	Opponent	Site	Result	Source
October	Huron		W 17–0	
October 18	Flandreau Indian School	Athletic Park; Brookings, SD	L 5–6	
November 7	South Dakota Mines		W 17–5	
November 8	Flandreau Indian School	College gridiron; Brookings, SD	W 28–0	
November 20	South Dakota	Brookings, SD (rivalry)	L 0–10	

== 1903 ==
1903 South Dakota Agricultural football
- Conference: Independent
- Record: 1–2
- Head coach: None
- Home stadium: Athletic Park

1903 Midwestern college football independents records
	Conf.			Overall
Team	W	L	T	W		L		T
Nebraska		–		11	–	0	–	0
North Dakota		–		7	–	0	–	0
Central Michigan		–		6	–	0	–	0
Notre Dame		–		8	–	0	–	1
Iowa State		–		8	–	1	–	0
Marquette		–		7	–	1	–	0
Lake Forest		–		6	–	1	–	0
North Dakota Agricultural		–		5	–	1	–	0
Haskell		–		7	–	2	–	0
St. Xavier		–		7	–	2	–	0
Fairmount		–		6	–	2	–	0
Wabash		–		9	–	3	–	0
Wittenberg		–		5	–	2	–	1
Doane		–		2	–	1	–	0
Northern Illinois State		–		4	–	2	–	0
American Medical		–		6	–	3	–	0
Kansas		–		6	–	3	–	0
Drake		–		5	–	3	–	0
Kirksville Osteopaths		–		5	–	3	–	0
Iowa State Normal		–		4	–	3	–	1
Ohio Medical		–		5	–	4	–	0
Lincoln (MO)		–		1	–	1	–	0
Michigan State Normal		–		4	–	4	–	0
Washington University		–		4	–	4	–	2
Heidelberg		–		3	–	4	–	2
Kansas State		–		3	–	4	–	1
Detroit College		–		3	–	4	–	0
Shurtleff		–		2	–	4	–	1
Ohio		–		2	–	4	–	0
South Dakota Agricultural		–		1	–	2	–	0
Mount Union		–		2	–	5	–	1
DePauw		–		2	–	6	–	1
Miami (OH)		–		1	–	4	–	0
Missouri		–		1	–	7	–	1
Western Illinois		–		0	–	3	–	1
Cincinnati		–		1	–	8	–	0
Baldwin–Wallace		–		0	–	1	–	0
Buchtel		–		0	–	2	–	0
Butler		–		0	–	3	–	0
Chicago P&S		–		0	–	4	–	0

The 1903 South Dakota Agricultural football team was an American football team that represented South Dakota Agricultural College as an independent during the 1903 college football season. The team compiled a 1–2 record.

=== Schedule ===
Date	Opponent	Site	Result	Source
October 19	at North Dakota Agricultural	Fargo, ND (rivalry)	L 0–85	
November 7	Flandreau Indian School	Athletic Park; Brookings, SD	W 22–0	
November 13	at Huron	Huron, SD	L 0–11	

== 1904 ==
1904 South Dakota State football
- Conference: Independent
- Record: 4–2–1
- Head coach: J. Harrison Werner (1st season)
- Home stadium: Athletic Park

1904 Midwestern college football independents records
	Conf.			Overall
Team	W	L	T	W		L		T
Saint Louis		–		10	–	0	–	0
Bethany (KS)		–		7	–	0	–	0
Northern Illinois State		–		5	–	0	–	0
Cape Girardeau Normal		–		2	–	0	–	0
Haskell		–		8	–	1	–	0
Cincinnati		–		7	–	1	–	0
Butler		–		6	–	1	–	0
Doane		–		5	–	1	–	0
Kansas		–		8	–	1	–	1
DePauw		–		8	–	2	–	0
Iowa State		–		7	–	2	–	0
Ohio Northern		–		7	–	2	–	1
Michigan State Normal		–		6	–	2	–	0
Wittenberg		–		6	–	2	–	0
Marquette		–		5	–	2	–	0
Nebraska		–		7	–	3	–	0
Detroit College		–		4	–	2	–	0
South Dakota State		–		4	–	2	–	1
Notre Dame		–		5	–	3	–	0
Iowa State Normal		–		5	–	3	–	1
Western Illinois		–		6	–	4	–	0
Heidelberg		–		6	–	4	–	1
Drake		–		5	–	4	–	0
Carthage		–		0	–	0	–	2
North Dakota Agricultural		–		3	–	3	–	0
Wabash		–		4	–	4	–	0
Fairmount		–		4	–	5	–	0
Lake Forest		–		3	–	5	–	1
Ohio Medical		–		2	–	4	–	2
Washington University		–		4	–	7	–	0
Ohio		–		2	–	4	–	1
Missouri		–		3	–	6	–	0
Mount Union		–		2	–	6	–	0
Miami (OH)		–		1	–	5	–	0
Kansas State		–		1	–	6	–	0
American Medical		–		0	–	3	–	0

The 1904 South Dakota State football team was an American football team that represented South Dakota State College of Agriculture and Mechanic Arts as an independent during the 1904 college football season. In its first and only year under head coach J. Harrison Werner, the team compiled a 4–2–1 record.

=== Schedule ===
Date	Time	Opponent	Site	Result	Attendance	Source
October 1	3:07 p.m.	Flandreau Indian School	Brookings, SD	W 15–0		
October 8		Madison Normal	Brookings, SD	W 11–5		
October 21	3:00 p.m.	Mitchell	Athletic Park; Brookings, SD	L 5–6		
October 29		vs. Huron	DeSmet, SD	W 15–0		
November 4		at South Dakota	Vermillion, SD (rivalry)	T 6–6		
November 18		Pipestone High School	Athletic Park; Brookings, SD	W 38–0		
November 25	2:30 p.m.	at Mitchell	Athletic Park; Mitchell, SD	L 0–10	1,000	

== 1905 ==
1905 South Dakota State football
- Conference: Independent
- Record: 2–3
- Head coach: William Blaine (1st season)

1905 Midwestern college football independents records
	Conf.			Overall
Team	W	L	T	W		L		T
Lincoln (MO)		–		3	–	0	–	0
Detroit College		–		1	–	0	–	0
Kansas		–		10	–	1	–	0
Central Michigan		–		7	–	1	–	0
Doane		–		5	–	1	–	0
Nebraska		–		9	–	2	–	0
Saint Louis		–		7	–	2	–	0
Butler		–		7	–	2	–	1
Kansas State		–		6	–	2	–	0
Northern Illinois State		–		3	–	1	–	1
Carthage		–		4	–	2	–	0
Western Illinois		–		4	–	2	–	0
Iowa State		–		6	–	3	–	0
Washington University		–		7	–	3	–	2
Wittenberg		–		7	–	4	–	0
Heidelberg		–		6	–	4	–	0
Iowa State Normal		–		5	–	3	–	2
Cincinnati		–		5	–	3	–	0
Miami (OH)		–		4	–	3	–	0
Missouri		–		5	–	4	–	0
Notre Dame		–		5	–	4	–	0
Fairmount		–		5	–	4	–	1
Haskell		–		5	–	4	–	1
Lake Forest		–		6	–	5	–	0
Wabash		–		6	–	5	–	0
Drake		–		4	–	4	–	0
Michigan State Normal		–		4	–	4	–	0
Marquette		–		3	–	4	–	0
South Dakota State		–		2	–	3	–	0
Ohio		–		2	–	5	–	2
DePauw		–		3	–	6	–	0
Mount Union		–		2	–	6	–	0
North Dakota Agricultural		–		1	–	4	–	1
Baldwin–Wallace		–		0	–	1	–	0
Chicago P&S		–		0	–	1	–	0
St. Mary's (OH)		–		0	–	3	–	0

The 1905 South Dakota State football team was an American football team that represented South Dakota State College of Agriculture and Mechanic Arts as an independent during the 1905 college football season. In its first and only year under head coach William Blaine, the team compiled a 2–3 record.

=== Schedule ===
Date	Time	Opponent	Site	Result	Attendance	Source
October 7	2:00 p.m.	Flandreau Indian School	City base ball park; Brookings, SD	W 46–0		
October 21		Madison High School	Athletic Park; Brookings, SD	W 28–0		
October 27	2:30 p.m.	Mitchell	Brookings, SD	L 0–24		
November 11		Minnesota	Northrop Field; Minneapolis, MN	L 0–81	1,000	
November 21		South Dakota	College field; Brookings, SD (rivalry)	L 0–17		

== 1906 ==
1906 South Dakota State football
- Conference: Independent
- Record: 3–1
- Head coach: William Juneau (1st season)
- Home stadium: Ball base park

1906 Midwestern college football independents records
	Conf.			Overall
Team	W	L	T	W		L		T
Saint Louis		–		11	–	0	–	0
North Dakota Agricultural		–		5	–	0	–	0
Butler		–		1	–	0	–	0
Michigan State Normal		–		5	–	0	–	1
Iowa State		–		9	–	1	–	0
Ohio		–		7	–	1	–	0
Notre Dame		–		6	–	1	–	0
St. Mary's (OH)		–		5	–	1	–	0
Fairmount		–		7	–	1	–	2
Wabash		–		5	–	1	–	1
South Dakota State		–		3	–	1	–	0
Kansas		–		7	–	2	–	2
Kansas State		–		5	–	2	–	0
Missouri		–		5	–	2	–	1
Detroit College		–		4	–	2	–	1
Northern Illinois State		–		4	–	2	–	1
Carthage		–		3	–	2	–	0
Lake Forest		–		3	–	2	–	0
Nebraska		–		6	–	4	–	0
Wittenberg		–		5	–	4	–	1
Heidelberg		–		3	–	3	–	1
Washington University		–		2	–	2	–	2
Beloit		–		3	–	4	–	1
Franklin		–		3	–	4	–	0
Doane		–		2	–	3	–	0
Shurtleff		–		2	–	4	–	2
Western State Normal		–		1	–	2	–	0
Mount Union		–		2	–	5	–	1
Drake		–		2	–	5	–	0
Haskell		–		2	–	5	–	0
Marquette		–		1	–	4	–	2
Chicago P&S		–		0	–	1	–	1
Cincinnati		–		0	–	7	–	2
Western Illinois		–		0	–	3	–	0

The 1906 South Dakota State football team was an American football team that represented South Dakota State College of Agriculture and Mechanic Arts as an independent during the 1906 college football season. In its first year under head coach William Juneau, the team compiled a 3–1 record.

=== Schedule ===
Date	Opponent	Site	Result	Attendance	Source
October 13	Huron	Ball base park; Brookings, SD	W 36–4		
November 2	North Dakota	Ball base park; Brookings, SD	W 5–4	500	
November 15	at Dakota Wesleyan	Mitchell, SD	W 11–4		
November 22	at South Dakota	Vermillion, SD (rivalry)	L 0–22		

== 1907 ==
1907 South Dakota State football
- Conference: Independent
- Record: 5–2
- Head coach: William Juneau (2nd season)
- Captain: Charles Coughlin
- Home stadium: Fair grounds

1907 Midwestern college football independents records
	Conf.			Overall
Team	W	L	T	W		L		T
Marquette		–		6	–	0	–	0
North Dakota Agricultural		–		3	–	0	–	0
Lincoln (MO)		–		1	–	0	–	0
Notre Dame		–		6	–	0	–	1
Miami (OH)		–		6	–	1	–	0
Michigan		–		5	–	1	–	0
Mount Union		–		9	–	2	–	0
Fairmount		–		8	–	2	–	0
Iowa State		–		6	–	2	–	0
Lake Forest		–		4	–	1	–	1
South Dakota State		–		5	–	2	–	0
St. Vincent's (IL)		–		5	–	2	–	0
Wabash		–		5	–	2	–	0
Saint Louis		–		7	–	3	–	0
Western State Normal		–		4	–	2	–	1
Kansas State		–		5	–	3	–	0
Michigan State Normal		–		3	–	2	–	0
Wittenberg		–		5	–	4	–	0
Central Michigan		–		3	–	3	–	0
Drake		–		3	–	4	–	1
Ohio		–		3	–	4	–	1
Western Illinois		–		2	–	3	–	0
Franklin		–		3	–	5	–	1
Heidelberg		–		2	–	4	–	1
Butler		–		1	–	3	–	2
Carthage		–		2	–	5	–	0
Haskell		–		2	–	6	–	1
Chicago P&S		–		1	–	3	–	0
Detroit College		–		1	–	3	–	0
Northern Illinois State		–		1	–	4	–	1
Doane		–		1	–	5	–	0
St. Mary's (OH)		–		0	–	4	–	0
Baldwin–Wallace		–		0	–	6	–	0

The 1907 South Dakota State football team was an American football team that represented South Dakota State College of Agriculture and Mechanic Arts as an independent during the 1907 college football season. In its second and final year under head coach William Juneau, the team compiled a 5–2 record.

=== Schedule ===
Date	Opponent	Site	Result	Source
October 12	Huron	Brookings, SD	L 0–4	
October 19	Flandreau Indian School	Fair grounds; Brookings, SD	W 46–0	
October 26	Toland's Business College	Fair grounds; Brookings, SD	W 29–0	
November 1	at North Dakota	Grand Forks, ND	L 6–24	
November 8	Dakota Wesleyan	Fair grounds; Brookings, SD	W 5–0	
November 16	at Yankton	Yankton, SD	W 12–10	
November 22 (?)	Huron		W 8–4	

== 1908 ==
1908 South Dakota State football
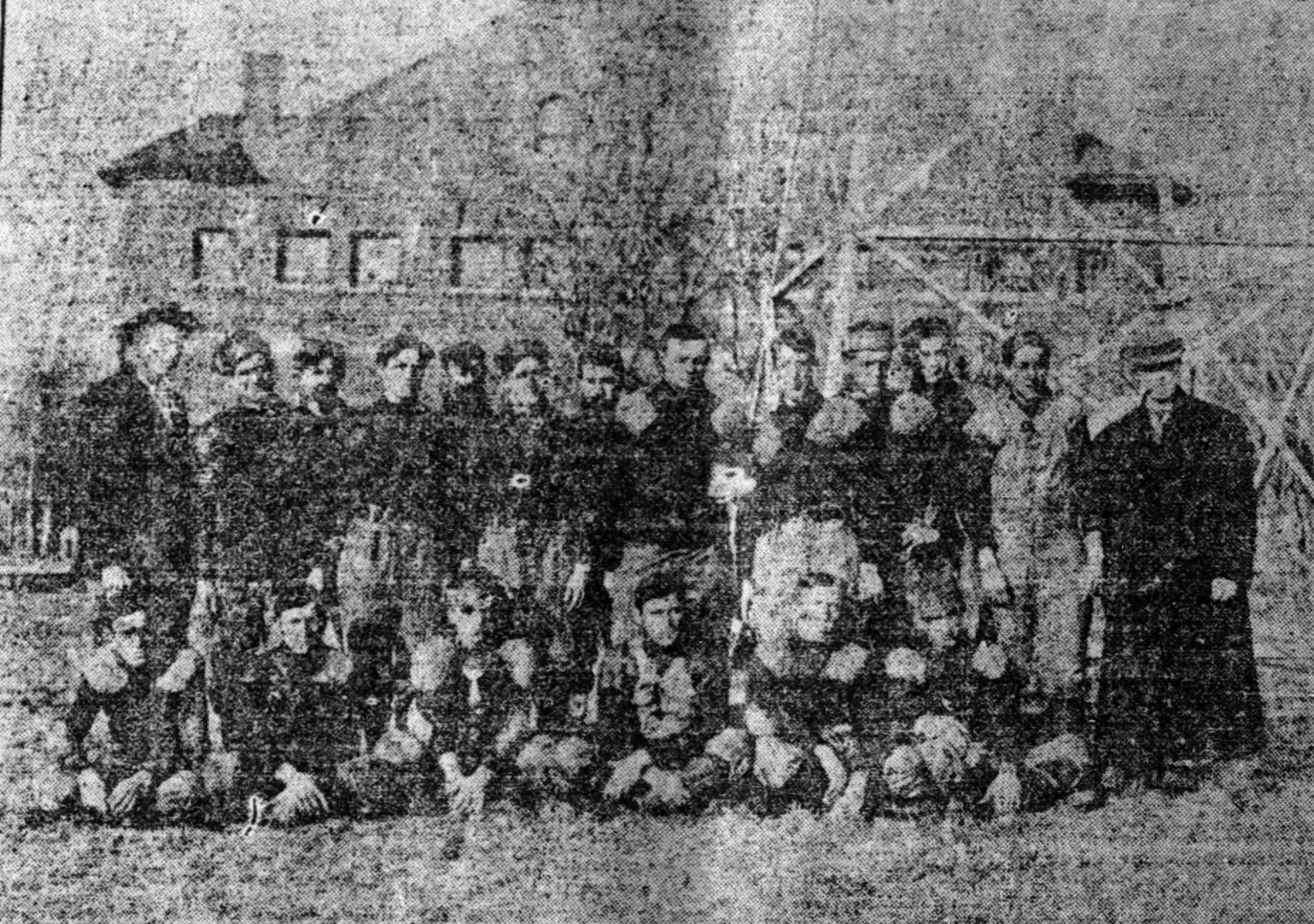
- 1908 South Dakota State football team
- Conference: Independent
- Record: 3–3–1
- Head coach: Jason M. Saunderson (1st season)
- Home stadium: Fair grounds

1908 Midwestern college football independents records
	Conf.			Overall
Team	W	L	T	W		L		T
Kirksville Normal		–		8	–	0	–	0
Miami (OH)		–		7	–	0	–	0
Iowa State Normal		–		5	–	0	–	0
Lincoln (MO)		–		2	–	0	–	0
DePaul		–		7	–	0	–	1
St. Mary's (OH)		–		7	–	0	–	1
Butler		–		5	–	0	–	1
Ohio Northern		–		9	–	1	–	0
Fairmount		–		8	–	1	–	0
Notre Dame		–		8	–	1	–	0
Michigan Agricultural		–		6	–	0	–	2
Lake Forest		–		4	–	1	–	1
Saint Louis		–		6	–	2	–	2
Kansas State		–		6	–	2	–	0
Michigan		–		5	–	2	–	1
Marquette		–		4	–	2	–	1
St. Viator		–		5	–	3	–	0
Central Michigan		–		4	–	3	–	0
Mount Union		–		5	–	4	–	1
Doane		–		4	–	4	–	0
South Dakota State		–		3	–	3	–	1
Buchtel		–		3	–	4	–	0
Western State Normal		–		3	–	4	–	0
Western Illinois		–		2	–	3	–	1
Carthage		–		2	–	3	–	0
Haskell		–		3	–	5	–	1
Wittenberg		–		3	–	5	–	1
Ohio		–		3	–	5	–	0
North Dakota Agricultural		–		2	–	3	–	0
Cincinnati		–		1	–	4	–	1
Wabash		–		2	–	6	–	0
Northern Illinois State		–		1	–	5	–	1
Michigan State Normal		–		1	–	4	–	0
Heidelberg		–		1	–	6	–	0
Franklin		–		0	–	9	–	1
Baldwin–Wallace		–		0	–	2	–	0
Chicago P&S		–		0	–	4	–	0

The 1908 South Dakota State football team was an American football team that represented South Dakota State College of Agriculture and Mechanic Arts as an independent during the 1908 college football season. In its first year under head coach Jason M. Saunderson, the team compiled a 3–3–1 record.

=== Schedule ===
Date	Opponent	Site	Result	Source
October 10	at Northern Normal	College grounds; Brookings, SD	W 16–0	
October 23	at North Dakota Agricultural	Fargo, ND (rivalry)	W 11–5	
October 30	Madison Normal	Fair grounds; Brookings, SD	T 0–0	
November 7	St. Thomas (MN)	Fair grounds; Brookings, SD	W 29–12	
November 13	Yankton	Brookings, SD	L 0–21	
	Dakota Wesleyan		L 0–6	
November 26	at Huron	Huron, SD	L 0–17	

== 1909 ==
1909 South Dakota State football
- Conference: Independent
- Record: 1–3
- Head coach: Jason M. Saunderson (2nd season)
- Home stadium: Fair grounds

1909 Midwestern college football independents records
	Conf.			Overall
Team	W	L	T	W		L		T
Iowa State Normal		–		6	–	0	–	0
Notre Dame		–		7	–	0	–	1
Michigan Agricultural		–		8	–	1	–	0
Carthage		–		6	–	1	–	0
Michigan		–		6	–	1	–	0
Western State Normal		–		6	–	1	–	0
Mount Union		–		8	–	2	–	0
Lake Forest		–		5	–	1	–	1
Haskell		–		7	–	2	–	0
Detroit College		–		3	–	1	–	2
Butler		–		5	–	3	–	0
Central Michigan		–		4	–	3	–	0
St. Mary's (OH)		–		4	–	3	–	0
Cincinnati		–		4	–	3	–	1
Doane		–		3	–	2	–	3
Buchtel		–		4	–	4	–	0
Rose Poly		–		4	–	4	–	0
Marquette		–		2	–	2	–	1
North Dakota Agricultural		–		2	–	2	–	1
Wabash		–		3	–	4	–	1
Miami (OH)		–		3	–	4	–	0
Ohio		–		2	–	4	–	2
Saint Louis		–		3	–	5	–	0
Michigan State Normal		–		2	–	4	–	0
Western Illinois		–		1	–	2	–	0
Fairmount		–		2	–	5	–	1
Northern Illinois State		–		2	–	6	–	0
South Dakota State		–		1	–	3	–	0
Heidelberg		–		0	–	7	–	2

The 1909 South Dakota State football team was an American football team that represented South Dakota State College of Agriculture and Mechanic Arts as an independent during the 1909 college football season. In its second year under head coach Jason M. Saunderson, the team compiled a 1–3 record.

=== Schedule ===
Date	Opponent	Site	Result	Source
October 22	North Dakota Agricultural	Fair grounds; Brookings, SD (rivalry)	L 5–11	
October 29	Dakota Wesleyan	Fair grounds; Brookings, SD	L 0–3	
November 4	at Yankton	Yankton, SD	L 12–14	
November 25	Huron	Fair grounds; Brookings, SD	W 44–0	
