= Indiana State Normal football, 1896–1898 =

American college football seasons

The Indiana State Normal football program's first three seasons of competition were from 1896 to 1898, representing Indiana State Normal School—now known as Indiana State University—as an independent. The school did not field a team in 1899 or 1900, and resumed play in 1901.

== 1896 ==
1896 Indiana State Normal football
- Conference: Independent
- Record: 0–1

1896 Midwestern college football independents records
	Conf.			Overall
Team	W	L	T	W		L		T
Carthage		–		4	–	0	–	0
St. Ignatius College Chicago		–		1	–	0	–	0
Washburn		–		6	–	1	–	1
Iowa Agricultural		–		8	–	2	–	0
Central Michigan		–		3	–	1	–	0
Miami (OH)		–		3	–	1	–	0
Ohio Wesleyan		–		6	–	2	–	0
Detroit College		–		5	–	2	–	0
North Dakota Agricultural		–		3	–	1	–	1
Heidelberg		–		2	–	1	–	0
Ohio		–		4	–	2	–	1
Indiana		–		5	–	3	–	0
Beloit		–		2	–	1	–	3
Butler		–		4	–	3	–	0
Iowa State Normal		–		4	–	3	–	0
Notre Dame		–		4	–	3	–	0
Cincinnati		–		4	–	3	–	1
Wittenberg		–		5	–	4	–	0
Baldwin–Wallace		–		2	–	2	–	0
College of Emporia		–		2	–	3	–	0
Ohio State		–		5	–	5	–	1
Lake Forest		–		3	–	4	–	1
Mount Union		–		3	–	4	–	1
Wabash		–		3	–	4	–	0
Drake		–		2	–	3	–	0
Chicago P&S		–		2	–	4	–	2
Hillsdale		–		2	–	4	–	0
Kansas State		–		0	–	1	–	1
Indiana State Normal		–		0	–	1	–	0
Buchtel		–		0	–	1	–	0
Washington University		–		0	–	2	–	0
Doane		–		0	–	5	–	0
Haskell		–		0	–	5	–	0

The 1896 Indiana State Normal football team represented Indiana State Normal School—now known as Indiana State University—as an independent during the 1896 college football season. This was the inaugural team for the school. Indiana State Normal played one game, versus Terre Haute High School; later Terre Haute William Wiley High. Few to no records remain, though it is known the Sycamores lost to the high schoolers. The coach is unknown and the only player known is Lotus Coffman, future college president.

=== Schedule ===
Date	Opponent	Site	Result
October 10	Terre Haute High School	Parsons Field; Terre Haute, IN	L

== 1897 ==
1897 Indiana State Normal football
- Conference: Independent
- Record: 1–4
- Head coach: R. Clark (1st season)

1897 Midwestern college football independents records
	Conf.			Overall
Team	W	L	T	W		L		T
Butler		–		3	–	0	–	0
Fairmount		–		1	–	0	–	0
Washburn		–		7	–	1	–	0
Cincinnati		–		9	–	1	–	1
Iowa State Normal		–		5	–	1	–	0
Ohio Wesleyan		–		7	–	1	–	1
Indiana		–		6	–	1	–	1
Ohio		–		7	–	2	–	0
Carthage		–		3	–	1	–	0
Iowa Agricultural		–		3	–	1	–	0
Notre Dame		–		4	–	1	–	1
Central Michigan		–		2	–	1	–	0
Baldwin–Wallace		–		2	–	1	–	1
Chicago Dental Infirmary		–		2	–	2	–	1
Lake Forest		–		4	–	5	–	1
Drake		–		2	–	3	–	0
Heidelberg		–		2	–	3	–	0
Detroit College		–		1	–	2	–	0
Indiana Normal		–		1	–	4	–	0
Kansas State		–		1	–	2	–	1
Mount Union		–		2	–	4	–	1
Rush Medical College		–		1	–	4	–	1
DePauw		–		2	–	6	–	0
Wittenberg		–		2	–	6	–	0
Haskell		–		1	–	4	–	0
Indiana State Normal		–		1	–	4	–	0
Ohio State		–		1	–	7	–	1
Lincoln (MO)		–		0	–	1	–	0
South Dakota Agricultural		–		0	–	1	–	0
Washington University		–		0	–	2	–	0
North Dakota Agricultural		–		0	–	3	–	0

The 1897 Indiana State Normal football team represented Indiana State Normal School—now known as Indiana State University—as an independent during the 1897 college football season. The coach was R. Clark; also described as the team manager, the roster consisted of at least 11 lettermen.

=== Schedule ===
Date	Opponent	Site	Result	Source
October 16	Rose Polytechnic freshmen	Terre Haute, IN	L 0–10	
October 23	Terre Haute High School	Terre Haute, IN	L 0–6	
November 6	Terre Haute High School	Terre Haute, IN	L 4–6	
November 13	at Central Academy	Plainfield, IN	L 0–10	
November 25	Greencastle Athletic Association	Terre Haute, IN	W 6–0	

== 1898 ==
1898 Indiana State Normal football
- Conference: Independent
- Record: 1–2
- Head coach: Fred DuBridge (1st season)

1898 Midwestern college football independents records
	Conf.			Overall
Team	W	L	T	W		L		T
Washington University		–		6	–	0	–	0
Detroit College		–		5	–	0	–	0
Carthage		–		3	–	0	–	0
Lincoln (MO)		–		1	–	0	–	0
Iowa State Normal		–		4	–	0	–	1
Washburn		–		4	–	0	–	1
Kansas		–		7	–	1	–	0
Cincinnati		–		6	–	1	–	2
Indiana		–		4	–	1	–	2
Nebraska		–		8	–	3	–	0
Drake		–		4	–	2	–	0
Lake Forest		–		2	–	1	–	0
Notre Dame		–		4	–	2	–	0
Western Reserve		–		5	–	3	–	0
Butler		–		2	–	1	–	1
Heidelberg		–		4	–	3	–	0
Michigan Agricultural		–		4	–	3	–	0
Iowa State		–		3	–	2	–	0
Kansas State		–		1	–	1	–	2
Miami (OH)		–		1	–	1	–	0
South Dakota Agricultural		–		1	–	1	–	1
DePauw		–		3	–	4	–	2
Iowa		–		3	–	4	–	2
Ohio State		–		3	–	5	–	0
Baldwin–Wallace		–		2	–	4	–	0
Central Michigan		–		1	–	2	–	0
Indiana State Normal		–		1	–	2	–	0
North Dakota Agricultural		–		1	–	2	–	0
Wabash		–		2	–	5	–	1
Ohio Wesleyan		–		2	–	5	–	0
Ohio		–		1	–	3	–	0
Haskell		–		2	–	7	–	0
Missouri		–		1	–	4	–	1
Wittenberg		–		1	–	5	–	1
Fairmount		–		0	–	1	–	0
College of Emporia		–		0	–	2	–	0

The 1898 Indiana State Normal football team represented Indiana State Normal School—now known as Indiana State University—as an independent during the 1898 college football season. This was the third team fielded by the school. Led by Fred DuBridge in his first and only season as head coach, Indiana State compiled a record of 1–2. The roster consisted of at least 18 lettermen.

DuBridge, the director of the local YMCA, spend most of his career managing YMCA facilities; his son Lee achieved fame as one of the most preeminent scientists of the 20th century.

=== Schedule ===
Date	Opponent	Site	Result	Source
October 8	at DePauw	Greencastle, IN	L 0–57	
October 29	at Rose Polytechnic	Terre Haute, IN	L 5–6	
	Sullivan High School	Terre Haute, IN	W 22–0	
