= 1898 Indiana Hoosiers football team =

American college football season

1898 Indiana Hoosiers football
- Conference: Independent
- Record: 4–1–2
- Head coach: James H. Horne (1st season)
- Captain: William Youtsler
- Home stadium: Jordan Field

1898 Midwestern college football independents records
	Conf.			Overall
Team	W	L	T	W		L		T
Washington University		–		6	–	0	–	0
Detroit College		–		5	–	0	–	0
Carthage		–		3	–	0	–	0
Lincoln (MO)		–		1	–	0	–	0
Iowa State Normal		–		4	–	0	–	1
Washburn		–		4	–	0	–	1
Kansas		–		7	–	1	–	0
Cincinnati		–		6	–	1	–	2
Indiana		–		4	–	1	–	2
Nebraska		–		8	–	3	–	0
Drake		–		4	–	2	–	0
Lake Forest		–		2	–	1	–	0
Notre Dame		–		4	–	2	–	0
Western Reserve		–		5	–	3	–	0
Butler		–		2	–	1	–	1
Heidelberg		–		4	–	3	–	0
Michigan Agricultural		–		4	–	3	–	0
Iowa State		–		3	–	2	–	0
Kansas State		–		1	–	1	–	2
Miami (OH)		–		1	–	1	–	0
South Dakota Agricultural		–		1	–	1	–	1
DePauw		–		3	–	4	–	2
Iowa		–		3	–	4	–	2
Ohio State		–		3	–	5	–	0
Baldwin–Wallace		–		2	–	4	–	0
Central Michigan		–		1	–	2	–	0
Indiana State Normal		–		1	–	2	–	0
North Dakota Agricultural		–		1	–	2	–	0
Wabash		–		2	–	5	–	1
Ohio Wesleyan		–		2	–	5	–	0
Ohio		–		1	–	3	–	0
Haskell		–		2	–	7	–	0
Missouri		–		1	–	4	–	1
Wittenberg		–		1	–	5	–	1
Fairmount		–		0	–	1	–	0
College of Emporia		–		0	–	2	–	0

The 1898 Indiana Hoosiers football team was an American football team that represented Indiana University Bloomington during the 1898 college football season. In their first season under head coach James H. Horne, the Hoosiers compiled a 4–1–2 record.

== Schedule ==
Date	Opponent	Site	Result	Attendance	Source
October 8	Rose Polytechnic	Jordan Field; Bloomington, IN	W 11–0		
October 22	Emmerich Manual High School	Jordan Field; Bloomington, IN	W 27–0		
October 29	Cincinnati	Jordan Field; Bloomington, IN	T 0–0	325	
November 5	at Notre Dame	Brownson Hall field; Notre Dame, IN	W 11–5		
November 7	at DePauw	McKeen Field; Greencastle, IN	W 32–0		
November 12	at Purdue	Stuart Field; West Lafayette, IN (rivalry)	L 0–14		
November 24	at Cincinnati	Union Ball Park; Cincinnati, OH	T 11–11		

== Personnel ==
=== Roster ===
Name	Position	Year
Pike	Right Guard	
Sparks	Left Guard	
Lee F. Hunt	Right Half	
William D. Youstler (C)	Left Half	
Clouser	Right Half	
John Clark Hubbard	Right Tackle	
McGorney	Left End	
Niezer	Left Tackle	
Hurley	Center	
Hubble	Right Tackle, Right Half	
Frank Aydelotte	Right End, Left Half	
Dodge	Right End	
John A. Foster	Quarterback	Freshman
Hawley	Full Back	

=== Staffing ===
James Howard Horne, Head coach
