= 1898 DePauw football team =

American college football season

1898 DePauw football
- Conference: Independent
- Record: 3–4–2
- Head coach: Samuel Ruick (1st season)

1898 Midwestern college football independents records
	Conf.			Overall
Team	W	L	T	W		L		T
Washington University		–		6	–	0	–	0
Detroit College		–		5	–	0	–	0
Carthage		–		3	–	0	–	0
Lincoln (MO)		–		1	–	0	–	0
Iowa State Normal		–		4	–	0	–	1
Washburn		–		4	–	0	–	1
Kansas		–		7	–	1	–	0
Cincinnati		–		6	–	1	–	2
Indiana		–		4	–	1	–	2
Nebraska		–		8	–	3	–	0
Drake		–		4	–	2	–	0
Lake Forest		–		2	–	1	–	0
Notre Dame		–		4	–	2	–	0
Western Reserve		–		5	–	3	–	0
Butler		–		2	–	1	–	1
Heidelberg		–		4	–	3	–	0
Michigan Agricultural		–		4	–	3	–	0
Iowa State		–		3	–	2	–	0
Kansas State		–		1	–	1	–	2
Miami (OH)		–		1	–	1	–	0
South Dakota Agricultural		–		1	–	1	–	1
DePauw		–		3	–	4	–	2
Iowa		–		3	–	4	–	2
Ohio State		–		3	–	5	–	0
Baldwin–Wallace		–		2	–	4	–	0
Central Michigan		–		1	–	2	–	0
Indiana State Normal		–		1	–	2	–	0
North Dakota Agricultural		–		1	–	2	–	0
Wabash		–		2	–	5	–	1
Ohio Wesleyan		–		2	–	5	–	0
Ohio		–		1	–	3	–	0
Haskell		–		2	–	7	–	0
Missouri		–		1	–	4	–	1
Wittenberg		–		1	–	5	–	1
Fairmount		–		0	–	1	–	0
College of Emporia		–		0	–	2	–	0

The 1898 DePauw football team was an American football team that represented DePauw University as an independent during the 1898 college football season. Led by Samuel Ruick in his first and only season as head coach, DePauw compiled a 3–4–2 record. The team shut out three opponents, but was outscored 97 to 91, and suffered four shutouts against them by college opponents.

== Schedule ==
Date	Opponent	Site	Result	Source
October 1	Indianapolis Training School	Greencastle, IN	W 13–0	
October 8	Indiana State Normal	Greencastle, IN	W 57–0	
October 15	Illinois	Illinois Field; Champaign, IL	L 0–16	
October 22	Rose Polytechnic	Greencastle, IN	W 16–0	
October 28	Notre Dame	Brownson Hall field; Notre Dame, IN	L 0–32	
October 29	Culver Military Academy	Culver, IN	T 5–5	
November 7	Indiana	Greencastle, IN	L 0–32	
November 14	Butler	Greencastle, IN	T 0–0	
November 24	Rose Polytechnic	Terre Haute, IL	L 0–22	
