= 1898 Cincinnati football team =

American college football season

1898 Cincinnati football
- Conference: Independent
- Record: 6–1–2
- Head coach: Frank Cavanaugh (1st season)
- Captain: Albert Morrill
- Home stadium: League Park

1898 Midwestern college football independents records
	Conf.			Overall
Team	W	L	T	W		L		T
Washington University		–		6	–	0	–	0
Detroit College		–		5	–	0	–	0
Carthage		–		3	–	0	–	0
Lincoln (MO)		–		1	–	0	–	0
Iowa State Normal		–		4	–	0	–	1
Washburn		–		4	–	0	–	1
Kansas		–		7	–	1	–	0
Cincinnati		–		6	–	1	–	2
Indiana		–		4	–	1	–	2
Nebraska		–		8	–	3	–	0
Drake		–		4	–	2	–	0
Lake Forest		–		2	–	1	–	0
Notre Dame		–		4	–	2	–	0
Western Reserve		–		5	–	3	–	0
Butler		–		2	–	1	–	1
Heidelberg		–		4	–	3	–	0
Michigan Agricultural		–		4	–	3	–	0
Iowa State		–		3	–	2	–	0
Kansas State		–		1	–	1	–	2
Miami (OH)		–		1	–	1	–	0
South Dakota Agricultural		–		1	–	1	–	1
DePauw		–		3	–	4	–	2
Iowa		–		3	–	4	–	2
Ohio State		–		3	–	5	–	0
Baldwin–Wallace		–		2	–	4	–	0
Central Michigan		–		1	–	2	–	0
Indiana State Normal		–		1	–	2	–	0
North Dakota Agricultural		–		1	–	2	–	0
Wabash		–		2	–	5	–	1
Ohio Wesleyan		–		2	–	5	–	0
Ohio		–		1	–	3	–	0
Haskell		–		2	–	7	–	0
Missouri		–		1	–	4	–	1
Wittenberg		–		1	–	5	–	1
Fairmount		–		0	–	1	–	0
College of Emporia		–		0	–	2	–	0

The 1898 Cincinnati football team was an American football team that represented the University of Cincinnati as an independent during the 1898 college football season. Led by Frank Cavanaugh in his first and only season as head coach, Cincinnati compiled a record of 6–1–2 record. Albert Morrill was the team captain. The team played home games at League Park in Cincinnati.

== Schedule ==
Date	Time	Opponent	Site	Result	Attendance	Source
October 1	2:00 p.m.	at Ohio	Athens, OH	W 12–0	600–1,000	
October 8		at Miami (OH)	Oxford, OH (Victory Bell)	W 22–0		
October 15		at Vanderbilt	Dudley Field; Nashville, TN	W 12–0		
October 22	2:30 pm.	Oberlin	League Park; Cincinnati, OH	L 0–5		
October 29		at Indiana	Jordan Field; Bloomington, IN	T 0–0	325	
November 5		Alumni	League Park; Cincinnati, OH	W 12–0	200	
November 12		Ohio Wesleyan	League Park; Cincinnati, OH	W 57–0		
November 24		Indiana	League Park; Cincinnati, OH	T 11–11		
November 26		Dartmouth	League Park; Cincinnati, OH	W 17–12	1,500	
