= 1898 Iowa State Cyclones football team =

American college football season

1898 Iowa State Cyclones football
- Conference: Independent
- Record: 3–2
- Head coach: Pop Warner (4th season)
- Captain: Simon Tarr

1898 Midwestern college football independents records
	Conf.			Overall
Team	W	L	T	W		L		T
Washington University		–		6	–	0	–	0
Detroit College		–		5	–	0	–	0
Carthage		–		3	–	0	–	0
Lincoln (MO)		–		1	–	0	–	0
Iowa State Normal		–		4	–	0	–	1
Washburn		–		4	–	0	–	1
Kansas		–		7	–	1	–	0
Cincinnati		–		6	–	1	–	2
Indiana		–		4	–	1	–	2
Nebraska		–		8	–	3	–	0
Drake		–		4	–	2	–	0
Lake Forest		–		2	–	1	–	0
Notre Dame		–		4	–	2	–	0
Western Reserve		–		5	–	3	–	0
Butler		–		2	–	1	–	1
Heidelberg		–		4	–	3	–	0
Michigan Agricultural		–		4	–	3	–	0
Iowa State		–		3	–	2	–	0
Kansas State		–		1	–	1	–	2
Miami (OH)		–		1	–	1	–	0
South Dakota Agricultural		–		1	–	1	–	1
DePauw		–		3	–	4	–	2
Iowa		–		3	–	4	–	2
Ohio State		–		3	–	5	–	0
Baldwin–Wallace		–		2	–	4	–	0
Central Michigan		–		1	–	2	–	0
Indiana State Normal		–		1	–	2	–	0
North Dakota Agricultural		–		1	–	2	–	0
Wabash		–		2	–	5	–	1
Ohio Wesleyan		–		2	–	5	–	0
Ohio		–		1	–	3	–	0
Haskell		–		2	–	7	–	0
Missouri		–		1	–	4	–	1
Wittenberg		–		1	–	5	–	1
Fairmount		–		0	–	1	–	0
College of Emporia		–		0	–	2	–	0

The 1898 Iowa State Cyclones football team represented Iowa State College of Agricultural and Mechanic Arts (later renamed Iowa State University) as an independent during the 1898 college football season. In their fourth year under head coach Pop Warner, the Cyclones compiled a 3–2 record and were outscored by opponents by a combined total of 50 to 49. Simon Tarr was the team captain.

Between 1892 and 1913, the football team played on a field that later became the site of the university's Parks Library.

== Schedule ==
Date	Opponent	Site	Result	Source
October 1	Rush Medical	Ames, IA	W 10–0	
October 8	at Nebraska	Antelope Field; Lincoln, NE (rivalry)	L 10–23	
October 15	at Kansas	McCook Field; Lawrence, KS	L 6–11	
October 22	at Minnesota	Minneapolis, MN	W 6–0	
October 29	at Drake	Des Moines, IA	W 17–16	
