= 1898 Nebraska Bugeaters football team =

American college football season

1898 Nebraska Bugeaters football
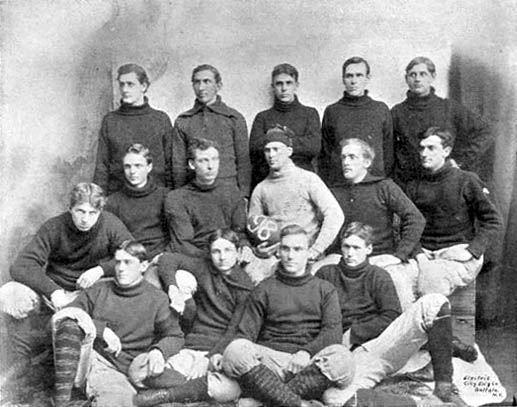
- Conference: Independent
- Record: 8–3
- Head coach: Fielding H. Yost (1st season)
- Home stadium: Antelope Field

1898 Midwestern college football independents records
	Conf.			Overall
Team	W	L	T	W		L		T
Washington University		–		6	–	0	–	0
Detroit College		–		5	–	0	–	0
Carthage		–		3	–	0	–	0
Lincoln (MO)		–		1	–	0	–	0
Iowa State Normal		–		4	–	0	–	1
Washburn		–		4	–	0	–	1
Kansas		–		7	–	1	–	0
Cincinnati		–		6	–	1	–	2
Indiana		–		4	–	1	–	2
Nebraska		–		8	–	3	–	0
Drake		–		4	–	2	–	0
Lake Forest		–		2	–	1	–	0
Notre Dame		–		4	–	2	–	0
Western Reserve		–		5	–	3	–	0
Butler		–		2	–	1	–	1
Heidelberg		–		4	–	3	–	0
Michigan Agricultural		–		4	–	3	–	0
Iowa State		–		3	–	2	–	0
Kansas State		–		1	–	1	–	2
Miami (OH)		–		1	–	1	–	0
South Dakota Agricultural		–		1	–	1	–	1
DePauw		–		3	–	4	–	2
Iowa		–		3	–	4	–	2
Ohio State		–		3	–	5	–	0
Baldwin–Wallace		–		2	–	4	–	0
Central Michigan		–		1	–	2	–	0
Indiana State Normal		–		1	–	2	–	0
North Dakota Agricultural		–		1	–	2	–	0
Wabash		–		2	–	5	–	1
Ohio Wesleyan		–		2	–	5	–	0
Ohio		–		1	–	3	–	0
Haskell		–		2	–	7	–	0
Missouri		–		1	–	4	–	1
Wittenberg		–		1	–	5	–	1
Fairmount		–		0	–	1	–	0
College of Emporia		–		0	–	2	–	0

The 1898 Nebraska Bugeaters football team represented the University of Nebraska in the 1898 college football season. The team was coached by first-year head coach Fielding H. Yost and played their home games at Antelope Field in Lincoln, Nebraska. After six seasons in the Western Interstate University Football Association, Nebraska began competing as an independent in 1898.

After the departure of Eddie N. Robinson following the 1897 season, Nebraska hired another future College Football Hall of Fame coach in Yost. Yost stayed at NU for just one year before moving on to Kansas, Stanford, and Michigan, where he won six national championships.

Nebraska played 11 games in 1898, the most in the program's nine-year history, including three instances with only one day off in between games.

== Schedule ==
Date	Time	Opponent	Site	Result
October 1	4:02 p.m.	Hastings	Antelope Field; Lincoln, NE	W 76–0
October 8	3:30 p.m.	Iowa State	Antelope Field; Lincoln, NE (rivalry)	W 23–10
October 15		Tarkio	Antelope Field; Lincoln, NE	W 24–0
October 22		vs. William Jewell	Kansas City, MO	W 38–0
October 24		at Missouri	Rollins Field; Columbia, MO (rivalry)	W 47–6
October 29		Grinnell	Antelope Field; Lincoln, NE	Canceled
November 5		at Kansas	Central Park; Lawrence, KS (rivalry)	W 18–6
November 7		at Kansas City Medics	Kansas City, MO	L 0–24
November 12	3:00 p.m.	Drake	Antelope Field; Lincoln, NE	L 5–6
November 17		at Colorado	Boulder, CO (rivalry)	W 23–10
November 19		at Denver AC	Denver, CO	W 11–10
November 24	3:45 p.m.	vs. Iowa	Union Park; Council Bluffs, IA (rivalry)	L 5–6

== Coaching staff ==
Coach	Position	First year	Alma mater
Fielding H. Yost	Head coach	1898	Lafayette
Jack Best	Trainer	1890	Nebraska
A. A. Bischof	Manager	1898	Nebraska
J. T. Hastie	Assistant manager	1898	Nebraska

== Roster ==
Benedict, Raymond HB
Brew, Fred E
Cowgill, Howard QB
Dasenbrock, John G
Drain, Ralph QB
Elliott, Ray QB
Erwin, C.W. FB
Follmer, Harry E
Garrett, Harry FB
Gilbert, Marvin LT
Hansen, Albert LG
Kingsbury, Raymond RT
Liebman, Morris HB
Melford, William C
Montgomery, R D
Pillsbury, Melville LT
Reasoner, Ira T
Stringer, Lewis E
Turner, Edmund RG
Williams, Charles Erwin HB

Starters

Position	Player
Quarterback	Howard Cowgill & Ralph Drain
Left halfback	Raymond Benedict
Right halfback	Harry Follmer
Fullback	C.W. Erwin
Left end	Fred Brew
Left tackle	Raymond Kingsbury
Left guard	Albert Hansen
Center	William Melford
Right guard	Edmund Turner
Right tackle	Melville Pillsbury
Right end	Lewis Stringer

== Game summaries ==
=== Hastings ===
Hastings at Nebraska

Team	1	2	Total
Hastings			0
• Nebraska			76

- Date: October 1
- Location: Antelope Field, Lincoln, NE

Nebraska hosted nearby Hastings College to open the season. The Bugeaters dominated the undermatched Broncos, setting new program records for points scored and margin of victory in a 76–0 shutout win.

=== Iowa State ===
Iowa State at Nebraska

Team	1	2	Total
Iowa State	0	10	10
• Nebraska	12	11	23

- Date: October 8
- Location: Antelope Field, Lincoln, NE

Nebraska jumped out to a halftime lead and held on in the second half to extend its winning streak to seven games.

=== Tarkio ===
Tarkio at Nebraska

Team	1	2	Total
Tarkio	0	0	0
• Nebraska	18	6	24

- Date: October 15
- Location: Antelope Field, Lincoln, NE

Nebraska jumped out to a quick 12–0 lead and shut down Tarkio's offense to win 24–0.

=== William Jewell ===
Nebraska vs. William Jewell

Team	1	2	Total
• Nebraska			38
William Jewell			0

- Date: October 22
- Location: Kansas City, MO

Nebraska overpowered William Jewell in Kansas City en route to a 38–0 shutout victory, NU's seventh shutout in its previous nine games. This was the only game ever played between Nebraska and William Jewell.

=== At Missouri ===
Nebraska at Missouri

Team	1	2	Total
• Nebraska			47
Missouri			6

- Date: October 24
- Location: Columbia, MO

Just two days after defeating William Jewell, Nebraska faced Missouri in Columbia. The Tigers jumped out to a 6–0 lead, but Nebraska answered with 47 unanswered points to earn a dominant win over Missouri for the second consecutive season.

=== Grinnell ===
Grinnell at Nebraska

Team	1	2	Total
Grinnell			N/A
Nebraska			N/A

- Date: October 29
- Location: Antelope Field, Lincoln, NE

Grinnell forced the game's cancellation, claiming Nebraska did not follow requirements in selecting game officials.

=== At Kansas ===
Nebraska at Kansas

Team	1	2	Total
• Nebraska	12	6	18
Kansas	0	6	6

- Date: November 5
- Location: Central Park, Lawrence, KS

Kansas lost a key (though unnamed) player to injury early in the game, and was unable to keep up with Nebraska. This was Nebraska's 11th consecutive victory.

=== At Kansas City Medics ===
Nebraska at KC Medics

Team	1	2	Total
Nebraska			0
• Kansas City Medics			24

- Date: November 7
- Location: Kansas City, MO

Nebraska faced the Kansas City Medics just two days after defeating Kansas. The Medics ended Nebraska's winning streak with a resounding 24–0 victory.

=== Drake ===
Drake at Nebraska

Team	1	2	Total
• Drake	6	0	6
Nebraska	5	0	5

- Date: November 12
- Location: Antelope Field, Lincoln, NE

Several key Nebraska players reportedly sat out with injuries following a dense stretch of games in the weeks prior. Drake took advantage of the undermanned Bugeaters, winning 6–5 in the first-ever meeting of these teams.

=== Colorado ===
Nebraska at Colorado

Team	1	2	Total
• Nebraska	10	13	23
Colorado	10	0	10

- Date: November 17
- Location: Boulder, CO

Nebraska made its first trip to Boulder in 1898, the first game in what would later become an annual rivalry. The Silver and Gold, as Colorado was known at the time, could not keep pace with the Bugeaters in the second half.

=== At Denver AC ===
Nebraska at Denver AC

Team	1	2	Total
• Nebraska	6	5	11
Denver AC	5	5	10

- Date: November 19
- Location: Denver, CO

A newspaper account of the time stated this game was "the most even and hardy contested fight that has been waged on the Denver gridiron". Nebraska again played with only one day off since its previous game. The Bugeaters took advantage of Denver kicking woes, staving off a late Denver drive into NU territory to win by a single point. This was the final meeting between Denver AC and Nebraska.

=== At Iowa ===
Nebraska at Iowa

Team	1	2	Total
Nebraska	5	0	5
• Iowa	0	6	6

- Date: November 24
- Location: Union Park, Council Bluffs, IA

Nebraska jumped out front with an early touchdown, and led 5–0 at halftime. A late Iowa touchdown and successful point after gave the Hawkeyes a 6–5 lead, at which point the game was called on account of darkness; frequent disputes had lengthened the game and prevented its completion.
