= 1898 Washington University football team =

American college football season

1898 Washington University football

Missouri champion
- Conference: Independent
- Record: 6–0
- Head coach: Edwin W. Lee (1st season)
- Captain: Bland
- Home stadium: Athletic Park

1898 Midwestern college football independents records
| | Conf. | | | Overall |
| Team | W | L | T | W | | L | | T |
|---|---|---|---|---|---|---|---|---|
| Washington University | | – | | 6 | – | 0 | – | 0 |
| Detroit College | | – | | 5 | – | 0 | – | 0 |
| Carthage | | – | | 3 | – | 0 | – | 0 |
| Lincoln (MO) | | – | | 1 | – | 0 | – | 0 |
| Iowa State Normal | | – | | 4 | – | 0 | – | 1 |
| Washburn | | – | | 4 | – | 0 | – | 1 |
| Kansas | | – | | 7 | – | 1 | – | 0 |
| Cincinnati | | – | | 6 | – | 1 | – | 2 |
| Indiana | | – | | 4 | – | 1 | – | 2 |
| Nebraska | | – | | 8 | – | 3 | – | 0 |
| Drake | | – | | 4 | – | 2 | – | 0 |
| Lake Forest | | – | | 2 | – | 1 | – | 0 |
| Notre Dame | | – | | 4 | – | 2 | – | 0 |
| Western Reserve | | – | | 5 | – | 3 | – | 0 |
| Butler | | – | | 2 | – | 1 | – | 1 |
| Heidelberg | | – | | 4 | – | 3 | – | 0 |
| Michigan Agricultural | | – | | 4 | – | 3 | – | 0 |
| Iowa State | | – | | 3 | – | 2 | – | 0 |
| Kansas State | | – | | 1 | – | 1 | – | 2 |
| Miami (OH) | | – | | 1 | – | 1 | – | 0 |
| South Dakota Agricultural | | – | | 1 | – | 1 | – | 1 |
| DePauw | | – | | 3 | – | 4 | – | 2 |
| Iowa | | – | | 3 | – | 4 | – | 2 |
| Ohio State | | – | | 3 | – | 5 | – | 0 |
| Baldwin–Wallace | | – | | 2 | – | 4 | – | 0 |
| Central Michigan | | – | | 1 | – | 2 | – | 0 |
| Indiana State Normal | | – | | 1 | – | 2 | – | 0 |
| North Dakota Agricultural | | – | | 1 | – | 2 | – | 0 |
| Wabash | | – | | 2 | – | 5 | – | 1 |
| Ohio Wesleyan | | – | | 2 | – | 5 | – | 0 |
| Ohio | | – | | 1 | – | 3 | – | 0 |
| Haskell | | – | | 2 | – | 7 | – | 0 |
| Missouri | | – | | 1 | – | 4 | – | 1 |
| Wittenberg | | – | | 1 | – | 5 | – | 1 |
| Fairmount | | – | | 0 | – | 1 | – | 0 |
| College of Emporia | | – | | 0 | – | 2 | – | 0 |

The 1898 Washington University football team represented Washington University in St. Louis as an independent during the 1898 college football season. Led by first-year head coach Edwin W. Lee, Washington University compiled a record of 6–0.

== Schedule ==
| Date | Time | Opponent | Site | Result | Attendance | Source |
|---|---|---|---|---|---|---|
| October 15 | 3:30 p.m. | Smith Academy | Pastime gridiron at DeHodiamont; St. Louis, MO | W 21–11 | 300 | |
| October 22 | 3:00 p.m. | Shurtleff | Athletic Park; St. Louis, MO | W 5–0 | | |
| October 29 | 3:15 p.m. | Missouri | Sportsman's Park; St. Louis, MO | W 18–12 | 1,000 | |
| November 5 | | Missouri Mines | Athletic Park; St. Louis, MO | W 35–0 | | |
| November 19 | . | All-St. Louis Team | Athletic Park; St. Louis, MO | W 29–0 | | |
| November 24 | 2:30 p.m. | Christian Brothers (MO) | Athletic Park; St. Louis, MO | W 35–0 | 1,500 | |
