= 1898 Ohio State Buckeyes football team =

American college football season

1898 Ohio State Buckeyes football
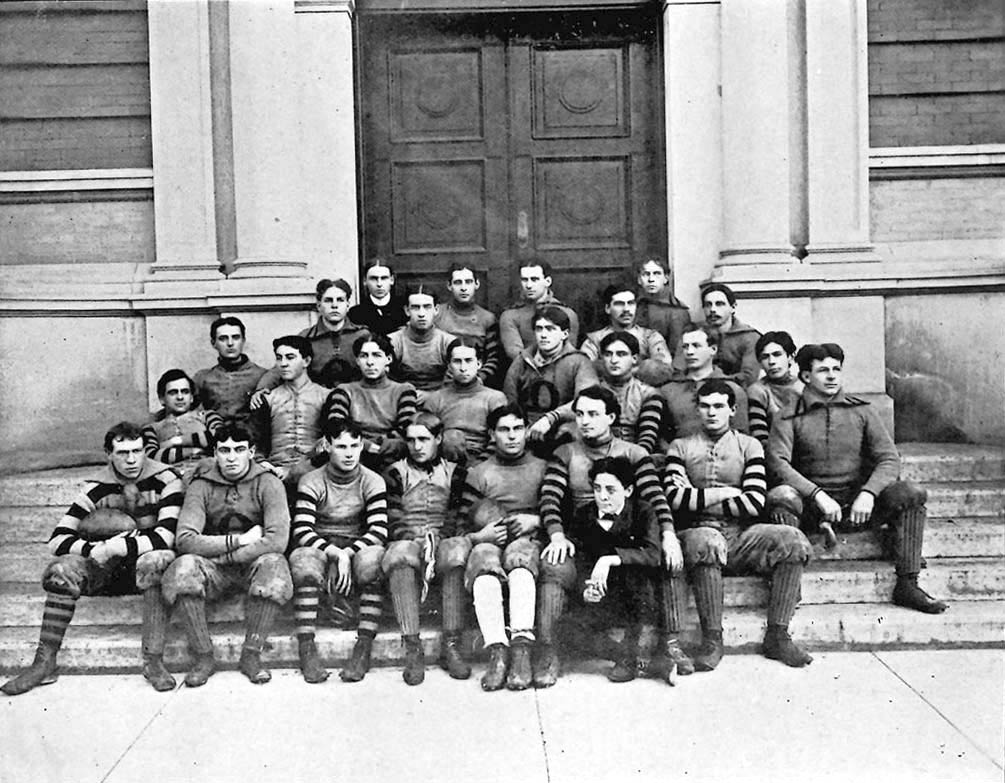
- Conference: Independent
- Record: 3–5
- Head coach: Jack Ryder (5th season)
- Home stadium: Ohio Field

1898 Midwestern college football independents records
	Conf.			Overall
Team	W	L	T	W		L		T
Washington University		–		6	–	0	–	0
Detroit College		–		5	–	0	–	0
Carthage		–		3	–	0	–	0
Lincoln (MO)		–		1	–	0	–	0
Iowa State Normal		–		4	–	0	–	1
Washburn		–		4	–	0	–	1
Kansas		–		7	–	1	–	0
Cincinnati		–		6	–	1	–	2
Indiana		–		4	–	1	–	2
Nebraska		–		8	–	3	–	0
Drake		–		4	–	2	–	0
Lake Forest		–		2	–	1	–	0
Notre Dame		–		4	–	2	–	0
Western Reserve		–		5	–	3	–	0
Butler		–		2	–	1	–	1
Heidelberg		–		4	–	3	–	0
Michigan Agricultural		–		4	–	3	–	0
Iowa State		–		3	–	2	–	0
Kansas State		–		1	–	1	–	2
Miami (OH)		–		1	–	1	–	0
South Dakota Agricultural		–		1	–	1	–	1
DePauw		–		3	–	4	–	2
Iowa		–		3	–	4	–	2
Ohio State		–		3	–	5	–	0
Baldwin–Wallace		–		2	–	4	–	0
Central Michigan		–		1	–	2	–	0
Indiana State Normal		–		1	–	2	–	0
North Dakota Agricultural		–		1	–	2	–	0
Wabash		–		2	–	5	–	1
Ohio Wesleyan		–		2	–	5	–	0
Ohio		–		1	–	3	–	0
Haskell		–		2	–	7	–	0
Missouri		–		1	–	4	–	1
Wittenberg		–		1	–	5	–	1
Fairmount		–		0	–	1	–	0
College of Emporia		–		0	–	2	–	0

The 1898 Ohio State Buckeyes football team represented the Ohio State University as an independent during the 1898 college football season. Led by Jack Ryder in his fifth and final season as head coach, the Buckeyes compiled a record of 3–5.

== Schedule ==
Date	Time	Opponent	Site	Result	Source
October 1		Heidelberg	Ohio Field; Columbus, OH	W 17–0	
October 8		Marietta	Ohio Field; Columbus, OH	L 0–10	
October 15		Denison	Ohio Field; Columbus, OH	W 34–0	
October 22		Marietta	Ohio Field; Columbus, OH	L 0–10	
November 5	3:00 p.m.	at Western Reserve	Adelbert Field; Cleveland, OH	L 0–49	
November 12		Case	Ohio Field; Columbus, OH	L 5–23	
November 19		Kenyon	Ohio Field; Columbus, OH	L 0–29	
November 24		Ohio Wesleyan	Ohio Field; Columbus, OH	W 24–0	
