= 1898 Missouri Tigers football team =

American college football season

1898 Missouri Tigers football
- Conference: Independent
- Record: 1–4–1
- Head coach: Dave Fultz (1st season)
- Captain: Thomas P. Howard
- Home stadium: Rollins Field

1898 Midwestern college football independents records
	Conf.			Overall
Team	W	L	T	W		L		T
Washington University		–		6	–	0	–	0
Detroit College		–		5	–	0	–	0
Carthage		–		3	–	0	–	0
Lincoln (MO)		–		1	–	0	–	0
Iowa State Normal		–		4	–	0	–	1
Washburn		–		4	–	0	–	1
Kansas		–		7	–	1	–	0
Cincinnati		–		6	–	1	–	2
Indiana		–		4	–	1	–	2
Nebraska		–		8	–	3	–	0
Drake		–		4	–	2	–	0
Lake Forest		–		2	–	1	–	0
Notre Dame		–		4	–	2	–	0
Western Reserve		–		5	–	3	–	0
Butler		–		2	–	1	–	1
Heidelberg		–		4	–	3	–	0
Michigan Agricultural		–		4	–	3	–	0
Iowa State		–		3	–	2	–	0
Kansas State		–		1	–	1	–	2
Miami (OH)		–		1	–	1	–	0
South Dakota Agricultural		–		1	–	1	–	1
DePauw		–		3	–	4	–	2
Iowa		–		3	–	4	–	2
Ohio State		–		3	–	5	–	0
Baldwin–Wallace		–		2	–	4	–	0
Central Michigan		–		1	–	2	–	0
Indiana State Normal		–		1	–	2	–	0
North Dakota Agricultural		–		1	–	2	–	0
Wabash		–		2	–	5	–	1
Ohio Wesleyan		–		2	–	5	–	0
Ohio		–		1	–	3	–	0
Haskell		–		2	–	7	–	0
Missouri		–		1	–	4	–	1
Wittenberg		–		1	–	5	–	1
Fairmount		–		0	–	1	–	0
College of Emporia		–		0	–	2	–	0

The 1898 Missouri Tigers football team was an American football team that represented the University of Missouri as an independent during the 1898 college football season. The team compiled a 1–4–1 record and was outscored by its opponents by a combined total of 98 to 33. Dave Fultz was the head coach for the first of two seasons. The team played its home games at Rollins Field in Columbia, Missouri.

== Schedule ==
Date	Time	Opponent	Site	Result	Attendance	Source
October 3		Wentworth Military	Rollins Field; Columbia, MO	T 0–0		
October 8		at Kansas City Medics	Kansas City, MO	L 0–16		
October 17		at Kansas City Medics	Kansas City, MO	W 15–5		
October 24		Nebraska	Rollins Field; Columbia, MO (rivalry)	L 6–47		
October 29	3:15 p.m.	at Washington University	Sportsman's Park; St. Louis, MO	L 12–18	1,000	
November 24	2:00 p.m.	vs. Kansas	Exposition Park; Kansas City, MO (rivlary)	L 0–12	2,000	
