= 1898 Haskell Indians football team =

American college football season

1898 Haskell Indians football
- Conference: Independent
- Record: 2–7
- Head coach: Sal Walker (1st season)

1898 Midwestern college football independents records
	Conf.			Overall
Team	W	L	T	W		L		T
Washington University		–		6	–	0	–	0
Detroit College		–		5	–	0	–	0
Carthage		–		3	–	0	–	0
Lincoln (MO)		–		1	–	0	–	0
Iowa State Normal		–		4	–	0	–	1
Washburn		–		4	–	0	–	1
Kansas		–		7	–	1	–	0
Cincinnati		–		6	–	1	–	2
Indiana		–		4	–	1	–	2
Nebraska		–		8	–	3	–	0
Drake		–		4	–	2	–	0
Lake Forest		–		2	–	1	–	0
Notre Dame		–		4	–	2	–	0
Western Reserve		–		5	–	3	–	0
Butler		–		2	–	1	–	1
Heidelberg		–		4	–	3	–	0
Michigan Agricultural		–		4	–	3	–	0
Iowa State		–		3	–	2	–	0
Kansas State		–		1	–	1	–	2
Miami (OH)		–		1	–	1	–	0
South Dakota Agricultural		–		1	–	1	–	1
DePauw		–		3	–	4	–	2
Iowa		–		3	–	4	–	2
Ohio State		–		3	–	5	–	0
Baldwin–Wallace		–		2	–	4	–	0
Central Michigan		–		1	–	2	–	0
Indiana State Normal		–		1	–	2	–	0
North Dakota Agricultural		–		1	–	2	–	0
Wabash		–		2	–	5	–	1
Ohio Wesleyan		–		2	–	5	–	0
Ohio		–		1	–	3	–	0
Haskell		–		2	–	7	–	0
Missouri		–		1	–	4	–	1
Wittenberg		–		1	–	5	–	1
Fairmount		–		0	–	1	–	0
College of Emporia		–		0	–	2	–	0

The 1898 Haskell Indians football team was an American football team that represented the Haskell Indian Institute (now known as Haskell Indian Nations University) as an independent during the 1898 college football season. The team compiled a 2–7 record and failed to score a point in six of its nine games. Sal Walker was the coach. The team played no home games.

== Schedule ==
Date	Time	Opponent	Site	Result	Source
September 24		at Kansas	McCook Field; Lawrence, KS	L 0–18	
October 1		at St. Mary's (KS)	St. Marys, KS	W 5–0	
October 12		at Kansas	McCook Field; Lawrence, KS	L 6–12	
October 18	2:30 p.m.	vs. Purdue	Newby Oval; Indianapolis, IN	L 0–5	
October 20		at Athletic Club of Indianapolis	Newby Oval; Indianapolis, IN	L 0–12	
October 22		at Purdue	Stuart Field; West Lafayette, IN	L 0–16	
October 31		at Kansas City Medics	Kansas City, MO	L 0–46	
November 5		at Denver Athletic Club	Denver, CO	W 12–5	
November 24		at Ensworth Medics	St. Joseph, MO	L 0–6 (forfeit)	
