= 1898 Iowa Hawkeyes football team =

American college football season

1898 Iowa Hawkeyes football
- Conference: Independent
- Record: 3–4–2
- Head coach: Alden Knipe (1st season)
- Captain: Samuel Hobbs
- Home stadium: Iowa Field

1898 Midwestern college football independents records
	Conf.			Overall
Team	W	L	T	W		L		T
Washington University		–		6	–	0	–	0
Detroit College		–		5	–	0	–	0
Carthage		–		3	–	0	–	0
Lincoln (MO)		–		1	–	0	–	0
Iowa State Normal		–		4	–	0	–	1
Washburn		–		4	–	0	–	1
Kansas		–		7	–	1	–	0
Cincinnati		–		6	–	1	–	2
Indiana		–		4	–	1	–	2
Nebraska		–		8	–	3	–	0
Drake		–		4	–	2	–	0
Lake Forest		–		2	–	1	–	0
Notre Dame		–		4	–	2	–	0
Western Reserve		–		5	–	3	–	0
Butler		–		2	–	1	–	1
Heidelberg		–		4	–	3	–	0
Michigan Agricultural		–		4	–	3	–	0
Iowa State		–		3	–	2	–	0
Kansas State		–		1	–	1	–	2
Miami (OH)		–		1	–	1	–	0
South Dakota Agricultural		–		1	–	1	–	1
DePauw		–		3	–	4	–	2
Iowa		–		3	–	4	–	2
Ohio State		–		3	–	5	–	0
Baldwin–Wallace		–		2	–	4	–	0
Central Michigan		–		1	–	2	–	0
Indiana State Normal		–		1	–	2	–	0
North Dakota Agricultural		–		1	–	2	–	0
Wabash		–		2	–	5	–	1
Ohio Wesleyan		–		2	–	5	–	0
Ohio		–		1	–	3	–	0
Haskell		–		2	–	7	–	0
Missouri		–		1	–	4	–	1
Wittenberg		–		1	–	5	–	1
Fairmount		–		0	–	1	–	0
College of Emporia		–		0	–	2	–	0

The 1898 Iowa Hawkeyes football team was an American football team that represented the State University of Iowa ("S.U.I."), now commonly known as the University of Iowa, as an independent during the 1898 college football season. In their first year under head coach Alden Knipe, the Hawkeyes compiled a 3–4–2 record. Iowa became an independent for the 1898 and 1899 seasons after the dissolution of the Western Interstate University Football Association (WIUFA).

Fullback Samuel Hobbs was the team captain. The team played its home games at Iowa Field in Iowa City, Iowa.

== Schedule ==
Date	Time	Opponent	Site	Result
October 1		Knox (IL)	Iowa Field; Iowa City, IA	T 0–0
October 8		at Chicago	Marshall Field; Chicago, IL	L 0–38
October 15		Drake	Iowa Field; Iowa City, IA	L 5–18
October 22		Upper Iowa	Iowa Field; Iowa City, IA	W 23–5
October 29		Rush Medical	Iowa Field; Iowa City, IA	L 11–15
November 5		Iowa State Normal	Iowa Field; Iowa City, IA	L 5–11
November 12		at Grinnell	Grinnell, IA	T 5–5
November 17		Simpson	Iowa Field; Iowa City, IA	W 12–0
November 24	3:45 p.m	vs. Nebraska	Union Park; Council Bluffs, IA (rivalry)	W 6–5

== Players ==
- Mark Baker
- Ausman Blackmore
- James Brockway
- Emmett Burrier
- William Coast
- Oren Deems
- George Egan
- Samuel Hobbs
- Frank Meggers
- Ray Morton
- Lawrence Pence
- Shrader
- Joseph Warner
- Fred Williams
- Samuel Williams
