= 1898 Western Reserve football team =

American college football season

1898 Western Reserve football
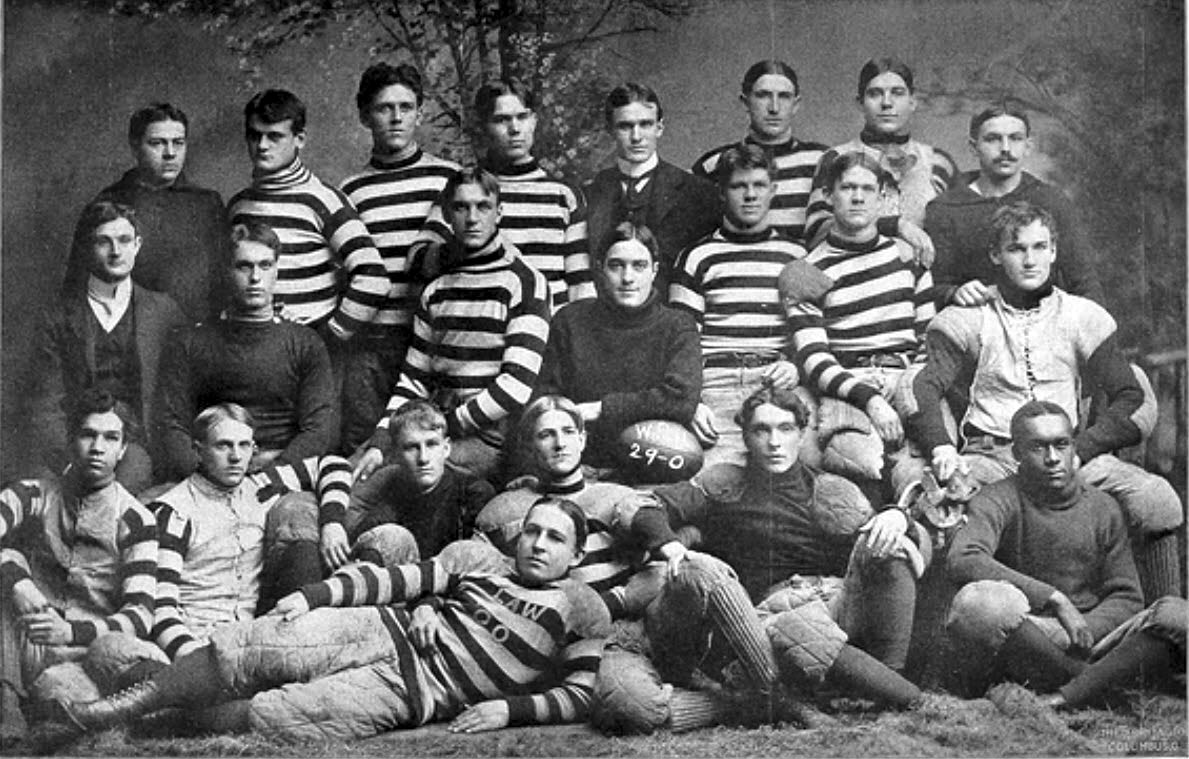
- Conference: Independent
- Record: 5–3
- Head coach: David C. MacAndrew (1st season)
- Captain: Roland T. Meacham
- Home stadium: Adelbert Field

1898 Midwestern college football independents records
	Conf.			Overall
Team	W	L	T	W		L		T
Washington University		–		6	–	0	–	0
Detroit College		–		5	–	0	–	0
Carthage		–		3	–	0	–	0
Lincoln (MO)		–		1	–	0	–	0
Iowa State Normal		–		4	–	0	–	1
Washburn		–		4	–	0	–	1
Kansas		–		7	–	1	–	0
Cincinnati		–		6	–	1	–	2
Indiana		–		4	–	1	–	2
Nebraska		–		8	–	3	–	0
Drake		–		4	–	2	–	0
Lake Forest		–		2	–	1	–	0
Notre Dame		–		4	–	2	–	0
Western Reserve		–		5	–	3	–	0
Butler		–		2	–	1	–	1
Heidelberg		–		4	–	3	–	0
Michigan Agricultural		–		4	–	3	–	0
Iowa State		–		3	–	2	–	0
Kansas State		–		1	–	1	–	2
Miami (OH)		–		1	–	1	–	0
South Dakota Agricultural		–		1	–	1	–	1
DePauw		–		3	–	4	–	2
Iowa		–		3	–	4	–	2
Ohio State		–		3	–	5	–	0
Baldwin–Wallace		–		2	–	4	–	0
Central Michigan		–		1	–	2	–	0
Indiana State Normal		–		1	–	2	–	0
North Dakota Agricultural		–		1	–	2	–	0
Wabash		–		2	–	5	–	1
Ohio Wesleyan		–		2	–	5	–	0
Ohio		–		1	–	3	–	0
Haskell		–		2	–	7	–	0
Missouri		–		1	–	4	–	1
Wittenberg		–		1	–	5	–	1
Fairmount		–		0	–	1	–	0
College of Emporia		–		0	–	2	–	0

The 1898 Western Reserve football team represented Western Reserve University—known as Case Western Reserve University—in the American city of Cleveland, Ohio, during the 1898 college football season. Led by David C. MacAndrew in his first season as head coach, Western Reserve compiled a record of 5–3 and outscored opponents by a total of 130 to 43. Roland T. Meacham was the team captain.

== Schedule ==
Date	Time	Opponent	Site	Result	Attendance	Source
October 8	3:15 p.m.	Baldwin–Wallace	Adelbert Field; Cleveland, OH	W 6–0		
October 15		at Michigan	Regents Field; Ann Arbor, MI	L 0–18		
October 22		Ohio Wesleyan	Adelbert Field; Cleveland, OH	W 29–0		
October 29	3:00 p.m.	Ohio State	Adelbert Field; Cleveland, OH	W 49–0		
November 5		Oberlin	Adelbert Field; Cleveland, OH	L 0–11		
November 12	3:45 p.m	Washington & Jefferson	Adelbert Field; Cleveland, OH	L 6–8	1,200	
November 19	2:30 p.m.	at Kenyon	Gambier, OH	W 6–5		
November 24	11:45 a.m.	at Case	League Park; Cleveland, OH	W 29–0	6,000	
