= 1898 Lincoln Tigers football team =

American college football season

1898 Lincoln Tigers football
- Conference: Independent
- Record: 1–0 (2 played)
- Head coach: G. F. Smith (1st season)
- Captain: Oscar Spencer
- Home stadium: Cottage Place Park

1898 Midwestern college football independents records
	Conf.			Overall
Team	W	L	T	W		L		T
Washington University		–		6	–	0	–	0
Detroit College		–		5	–	0	–	0
Carthage		–		3	–	0	–	0
Lincoln (MO)		–		1	–	0	–	0
Iowa State Normal		–		4	–	0	–	1
Washburn		–		4	–	0	–	1
Kansas		–		7	–	1	–	0
Cincinnati		–		6	–	1	–	2
Indiana		–		4	–	1	–	2
Nebraska		–		8	–	3	–	0
Drake		–		4	–	2	–	0
Lake Forest		–		2	–	1	–	0
Notre Dame		–		4	–	2	–	0
Western Reserve		–		5	–	3	–	0
Butler		–		2	–	1	–	1
Heidelberg		–		4	–	3	–	0
Michigan Agricultural		–		4	–	3	–	0
Iowa State		–		3	–	2	–	0
Kansas State		–		1	–	1	–	2
Miami (OH)		–		1	–	1	–	0
South Dakota Agricultural		–		1	–	1	–	1
DePauw		–		3	–	4	–	2
Iowa		–		3	–	4	–	2
Ohio State		–		3	–	5	–	0
Baldwin–Wallace		–		2	–	4	–	0
Central Michigan		–		1	–	2	–	0
Indiana State Normal		–		1	–	2	–	0
North Dakota Agricultural		–		1	–	2	–	0
Wabash		–		2	–	5	–	1
Ohio Wesleyan		–		2	–	5	–	0
Ohio		–		1	–	3	–	0
Haskell		–		2	–	7	–	0
Missouri		–		1	–	4	–	1
Wittenberg		–		1	–	5	–	1
Fairmount		–		0	–	1	–	0
College of Emporia		–		0	–	2	–	0

The 1898 Lincoln Tigers football team represented Lincoln Institute—now known as Lincoln University—in Jefferson City, Missouri as an independent during the 1898 college football season. This was one of the first years that Lincoln fielded a football team. The Tigers of Lincoln played two games during the season, against Garrison High School, and George R. Smith College. Lincoln's rivalry with George R. Smith lasted until 1925, when the latter college burned down. The first coach of Lincoln's team was professor G. F. Smith, while the first captain was Oscar Spencer.

== Schedule ==
Date	Time	Opponent	Site	Result	Source
November 5		at Garrison High School	Booneville, MO		
December 3	3:00 p.m.	George R. Smith	Cottage Place Park; Jefferson City, MO	W 10–0	

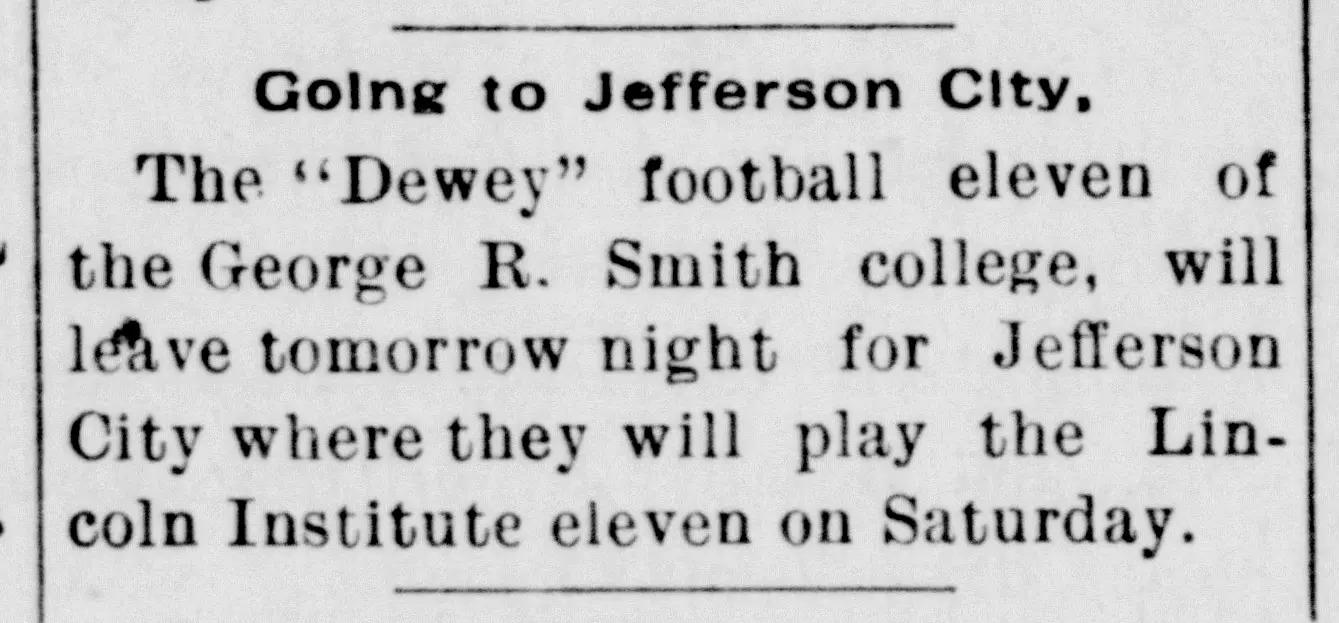
Lincoln's 1898 football game vs. George R. Smith, one of the first in Lincoln history
