= 1898 Drake Bulldogs football team =

American college football season

1898 Drake Bulldogs football
- Conference: Independent
- Record: 4–2
- Head coach: A. B. Potter (2nd season)

1898 Midwestern college football independents records
	Conf.			Overall
Team	W	L	T	W		L		T
Washington University		–		6	–	0	–	0
Detroit College		–		5	–	0	–	0
Carthage		–		3	–	0	–	0
Lincoln (MO)		–		1	–	0	–	0
Iowa State Normal		–		4	–	0	–	1
Washburn		–		4	–	0	–	1
Kansas		–		7	–	1	–	0
Cincinnati		–		6	–	1	–	2
Indiana		–		4	–	1	–	2
Nebraska		–		8	–	3	–	0
Drake		–		4	–	2	–	0
Lake Forest		–		2	–	1	–	0
Notre Dame		–		4	–	2	–	0
Western Reserve		–		5	–	3	–	0
Butler		–		2	–	1	–	1
Heidelberg		–		4	–	3	–	0
Michigan Agricultural		–		4	–	3	–	0
Iowa State		–		3	–	2	–	0
Kansas State		–		1	–	1	–	2
Miami (OH)		–		1	–	1	–	0
South Dakota Agricultural		–		1	–	1	–	1
DePauw		–		3	–	4	–	2
Iowa		–		3	–	4	–	2
Ohio State		–		3	–	5	–	0
Baldwin–Wallace		–		2	–	4	–	0
Central Michigan		–		1	–	2	–	0
Indiana State Normal		–		1	–	2	–	0
North Dakota Agricultural		–		1	–	2	–	0
Wabash		–		2	–	5	–	1
Ohio Wesleyan		–		2	–	5	–	0
Ohio		–		1	–	3	–	0
Haskell		–		2	–	7	–	0
Missouri		–		1	–	4	–	1
Wittenberg		–		1	–	5	–	1
Fairmount		–		0	–	1	–	0
College of Emporia		–		0	–	2	–	0

The 1898 Drake Bulldogs football team was an American football team that represented Drake University as an independent during the 1898 college football season. In its second season under head coach A. B. Potter, the team compiled a 4–2 record and outscored opponents by a total of 102 to 55. It was Drake's first winning season. In the final game of the season, the team defeated Nebraska.

== Schedule ==
Date	Opponent	Site	Result	Source
September 24	at Grinnell	Grinnell, IA	L 10–12	
October 8	at Monmouth (IL)	Monmouth, IL	W 34–0	
October 15	at Iowa	Iowa Field; Iowa City, IA	W 18–5	
October 29	Iowa State	Des Moines, IA	L 16–17	
November 5	at Grinnell	Grinnell, IA	W 18–16	
November 12	at Nebraska	Antelope Field; Lincoln, NE	W 6–5	
