= 1898 Fairmount Wheatshockers football team =

American college football season

1898 Fairmount Wheatshockers football
- Conference: Independent
- Record: 0–1
- Head coach: None
- Home stadium: Fairmount gridiron

1898 Midwestern college football independents records
	Conf.			Overall
Team	W	L	T	W		L		T
Washington University		–		6	–	0	–	0
Detroit College		–		5	–	0	–	0
Carthage		–		3	–	0	–	0
Lincoln (MO)		–		1	–	0	–	0
Iowa State Normal		–		4	–	0	–	1
Washburn		–		4	–	0	–	1
Kansas		–		7	–	1	–	0
Cincinnati		–		6	–	1	–	2
Indiana		–		4	–	1	–	2
Nebraska		–		8	–	3	–	0
Drake		–		4	–	2	–	0
Lake Forest		–		2	–	1	–	0
Notre Dame		–		4	–	2	–	0
Western Reserve		–		5	–	3	–	0
Butler		–		2	–	1	–	1
Heidelberg		–		4	–	3	–	0
Michigan Agricultural		–		4	–	3	–	0
Iowa State		–		3	–	2	–	0
Kansas State		–		1	–	1	–	2
Miami (OH)		–		1	–	1	–	0
South Dakota Agricultural		–		1	–	1	–	1
DePauw		–		3	–	4	–	2
Iowa		–		3	–	4	–	2
Ohio State		–		3	–	5	–	0
Baldwin–Wallace		–		2	–	4	–	0
Central Michigan		–		1	–	2	–	0
Indiana State Normal		–		1	–	2	–	0
North Dakota Agricultural		–		1	–	2	–	0
Wabash		–		2	–	5	–	1
Ohio Wesleyan		–		2	–	5	–	0
Ohio		–		1	–	3	–	0
Haskell		–		2	–	7	–	0
Missouri		–		1	–	4	–	1
Wittenberg		–		1	–	5	–	1
Fairmount		–		0	–	1	–	0
College of Emporia		–		0	–	2	–	0

The 1898 Fairmount Wheatshockers football team was an American football team that represented Fairmount College (now known as Wichita State University) as an independent during the 1898 college football season. They played in one game, a 5–0 loss against Friends.

== Schedule ==
Date	Opponent	Site	Result	Source
November 19	Friends	Fairmount gridiron; Wichita, KS	L 0–5	
