= 1898 Kansas Jayhawks football team =

American college football season

1898 Kansas Jayhawks football
- Conference: Independent
- Record: 7–1
- Head coach: Wylie G. Woodruff (2nd season)
- Captain: Arthur Mosse
- Home stadium: McCook Field

1898 Midwestern college football independents records
	Conf.			Overall
Team	W	L	T	W		L		T
Washington University		–		6	–	0	–	0
Detroit College		–		5	–	0	–	0
Carthage		–		3	–	0	–	0
Lincoln (MO)		–		1	–	0	–	0
Iowa State Normal		–		4	–	0	–	1
Washburn		–		4	–	0	–	1
Kansas		–		7	–	1	–	0
Cincinnati		–		6	–	1	–	2
Indiana		–		4	–	1	–	2
Nebraska		–		8	–	3	–	0
Drake		–		4	–	2	–	0
Lake Forest		–		2	–	1	–	0
Notre Dame		–		4	–	2	–	0
Western Reserve		–		5	–	3	–	0
Butler		–		2	–	1	–	1
Heidelberg		–		4	–	3	–	0
Michigan Agricultural		–		4	–	3	–	0
Iowa State		–		3	–	2	–	0
Kansas State		–		1	–	1	–	2
Miami (OH)		–		1	–	1	–	0
South Dakota Agricultural		–		1	–	1	–	1
DePauw		–		3	–	4	–	2
Iowa		–		3	–	4	–	2
Ohio State		–		3	–	5	–	0
Baldwin–Wallace		–		2	–	4	–	0
Central Michigan		–		1	–	2	–	0
Indiana State Normal		–		1	–	2	–	0
North Dakota Agricultural		–		1	–	2	–	0
Wabash		–		2	–	5	–	1
Ohio Wesleyan		–		2	–	5	–	0
Ohio		–		1	–	3	–	0
Haskell		–		2	–	7	–	0
Missouri		–		1	–	4	–	1
Wittenberg		–		1	–	5	–	1
Fairmount		–		0	–	1	–	0
College of Emporia		–		0	–	2	–	0

The 1898 Kansas Jayhawks football team represented the University of Kansas as an independent during the 1898 college football season. In their second and final season under head coach Wylie G. Woodruff, the Jayhawks compiled a 7–1 record, shut out six of eight opponents, and outscored all opponents by a combined total of 129 to 24. The Jayhawks played home games at McCook Field in Lawrence, Kansas. Arthur Mosse was the team captain.

== Schedule ==
Date	Time	Opponent	Site	Result	Attendance	Source
September 24		Haskell	McCook Field; Lawrence, KS	W 15–0		
October 5	10:00 a.m.	at Kansas City Medics	Exposition Park; Kansas City, MO	W 6–0	1,500	
October 15		Iowa State	McCook Field; Lawrence, KS	W 11–6		
October 22		at Warrensburg Normal	Warrensburg, MO	W 33–0		
October 29	3:30 p.m.	at Ensworth Medical	Athletic Park; St. Joseph, MO	W 40–0		
November 5		Nebraska	McCook Field; Lawrence, KS (rivalry)	L 6–18		
November 12		Kansas City Medics	McCook Field; Lawrence, KS	W 6–0		
November 24	2:00 p.m.	vs. Missouri	Exposition Park; Kansas City, MO (rivalry)	W 12–0	2,000	
