= 1898 Iowa State Normals football team =

American college football season

1898 Iowa State Normals football
- Conference: Independent
- Record: 4–0–1
- Head coach: Kalita E. Leighton (3rd season)

1898 Midwestern college football independents records
	Conf.			Overall
Team	W	L	T	W		L		T
Washington University		–		6	–	0	–	0
Detroit College		–		5	–	0	–	0
Carthage		–		3	–	0	–	0
Lincoln (MO)		–		1	–	0	–	0
Iowa State Normal		–		4	–	0	–	1
Washburn		–		4	–	0	–	1
Kansas		–		7	–	1	–	0
Cincinnati		–		6	–	1	–	2
Indiana		–		4	–	1	–	2
Nebraska		–		8	–	3	–	0
Drake		–		4	–	2	–	0
Lake Forest		–		2	–	1	–	0
Notre Dame		–		4	–	2	–	0
Western Reserve		–		5	–	3	–	0
Butler		–		2	–	1	–	1
Heidelberg		–		4	–	3	–	0
Michigan Agricultural		–		4	–	3	–	0
Iowa State		–		3	–	2	–	0
Kansas State		–		1	–	1	–	2
Miami (OH)		–		1	–	1	–	0
South Dakota Agricultural		–		1	–	1	–	1
DePauw		–		3	–	4	–	2
Iowa		–		3	–	4	–	2
Ohio State		–		3	–	5	–	0
Baldwin–Wallace		–		2	–	4	–	0
Central Michigan		–		1	–	2	–	0
Indiana State Normal		–		1	–	2	–	0
North Dakota Agricultural		–		1	–	2	–	0
Wabash		–		2	–	5	–	1
Ohio Wesleyan		–		2	–	5	–	0
Ohio		–		1	–	3	–	0
Haskell		–		2	–	7	–	0
Missouri		–		1	–	4	–	1
Wittenberg		–		1	–	5	–	1
Fairmount		–		0	–	1	–	0
College of Emporia		–		0	–	2	–	0

The 1898 Iowa State Normals football team represented Iowa State Normal School (later renamed University of Northern Iowa) as an independent during the 1898 college football season. In its first and only season under head coach Kalita E. Leighton, the team compiled a 4–0–1 record, including an 11–5 victory over the Iowa Hawkeyes, and outscored all opponents by a total of 92 to 5.

== Schedule ==
Date	Opponent	Site	Result	Source
October 1	East Waterloo HS	Cedar Rapids, IA	W 23–0	
October 15	Cornell (IA)	Cedar Rapids, IA	W 40–0	
October 22	Coe	Cedar Rapids, IA	W 18–0	
October 29	Upper Iowa	Cedar Falls, IA	T 0–0	
November 5	at Iowa	Iowa Field; Iowa City, IA	W 11–5	
