= 1898 Notre Dame football team =

American college football season

1898 Notre Dame football
- Conference: Independent
- Record: 4–2
- Head coach: Frank E. Hering (3rd season)
- Captain: Jack Mullen
- Home stadium: Brownson Hall field

1898 Midwestern college football independents records
	Conf.			Overall
Team	W	L	T	W		L		T
Washington University		–		6	–	0	–	0
Detroit College		–		5	–	0	–	0
Carthage		–		3	–	0	–	0
Lincoln (MO)		–		1	–	0	–	0
Iowa State Normal		–		4	–	0	–	1
Washburn		–		4	–	0	–	1
Kansas		–		7	–	1	–	0
Cincinnati		–		6	–	1	–	2
Indiana		–		4	–	1	–	2
Nebraska		–		8	–	3	–	0
Drake		–		4	–	2	–	0
Lake Forest		–		2	–	1	–	0
Notre Dame		–		4	–	2	–	0
Western Reserve		–		5	–	3	–	0
Butler		–		2	–	1	–	1
Heidelberg		–		4	–	3	–	0
Michigan Agricultural		–		4	–	3	–	0
Iowa State		–		3	–	2	–	0
Kansas State		–		1	–	1	–	2
Miami (OH)		–		1	–	1	–	0
South Dakota Agricultural		–		1	–	1	–	1
DePauw		–		3	–	4	–	2
Iowa		–		3	–	4	–	2
Ohio State		–		3	–	5	–	0
Baldwin–Wallace		–		2	–	4	–	0
Central Michigan		–		1	–	2	–	0
Indiana State Normal		–		1	–	2	–	0
North Dakota Agricultural		–		1	–	2	–	0
Wabash		–		2	–	5	–	1
Ohio Wesleyan		–		2	–	5	–	0
Ohio		–		1	–	3	–	0
Haskell		–		2	–	7	–	0
Missouri		–		1	–	4	–	1
Wittenberg		–		1	–	5	–	1
Fairmount		–		0	–	1	–	0
College of Emporia		–		0	–	2	–	0

The 1898 Notre Dame football team was an American football team that represented the University of Notre Dame in the 1898 college football season. In its third season with Frank E. Hering as coach, the team compiled a 4–2 record, shut out four opponents, and outscored all opponents by a combined total of 155 to 34.

== Schedule ==
Date	Opponent	Site	Result	Source
October 8	at Illinois	Illinois Field; Champaign, IL	W 5–0	
October 15	Michigan Agricultural	Brownson Hall field; Notre Dame, IN (rivalry)	W 53–0	
October 22	at Michigan	Regents Field; Ann Arbor, MI (rivalry)	L 0–23	
October 28	DePauw	Brownson Hall field; Notre Dame, IN	W 32–0	
November 5	Indiana	Brownson Hall field; Notre Dame, IN	L 5–11	
November 19	at Albion	Albion, MI	W 60–0	
