= Billy P. Williamson =

American football coach

Coaching career (HC unless noted)
- 1898: Kansas State

Head coaching record
- Overall: 1–1–2

William P. Williamson was an American college football coach. He served as the third head football coach at Kansas State Agricultural College, now Kansas State University. He held the position for one season in 1898, compiling a record of 1–1–2.

== Head coaching record ==
Year	Team	Overall	Conference	Standing	Bowl/playoffs
Kansas State Aggies (Independent) (1898)
1898	Kansas State	1–1–2			
Kansas State:		1–1–2			
Total:		1–1–2			
