= David C. MacAndrew =

American football player and coach (1874–1937)

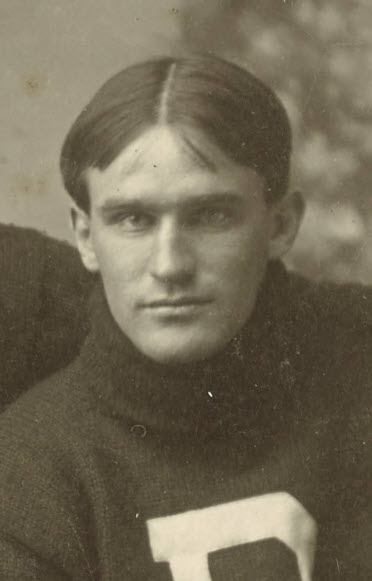

Biographical details
- Born: May 30, 1874; Brooklyn, New York, U.S.
- Died: August 15, 1937 (aged 63); Braintree, Massachusetts, U.S.

Playing career

Football
- 1894–1897: Dartmouth
- 1898: Newton Athletic Association

Baseball
- 1895–1898: Dartmouth
- Position: End (football)

Coaching career (HC unless noted)

Football
- 1898: Bowdoin
- 1898–1899: Western Reserve
- 1915–1916: Saint Mary's

Head coaching record
- Overall: 19–18–1

David Carr MacAndrew (May 30, 1874 – August 15, 1937) was an American football player and coach. He served as the head football coach at Bowdoin College in 1898, Western Reserve University—now known as Case Western Reserve University—from 1898 to 1899, and Saint Mary's College of California from 1915 to 1916, compiling a career college football coaching record of 19–18–1.

== Early life and playing career ==
MacAndrew was born in Brooklyn, New York, and moved to Braintree, Massachusetts, when he was a year old. MacAndrew attended the Thayer Academy in Braintree. For his undergraduate career, he attended Dartmouth College, graduating in 1898. He was a member of Theta Delta Chi fraternity.

As a collegiate athlete, he played football at Dartmouth as an end. MacAndrew was a four-year letter winner, playing from 1894 to 1897. MacAndrew was a member of the Dartmouth baseball team. He also played for the Newton Athletic Association against Yale in 1898.

== Coaching career ==
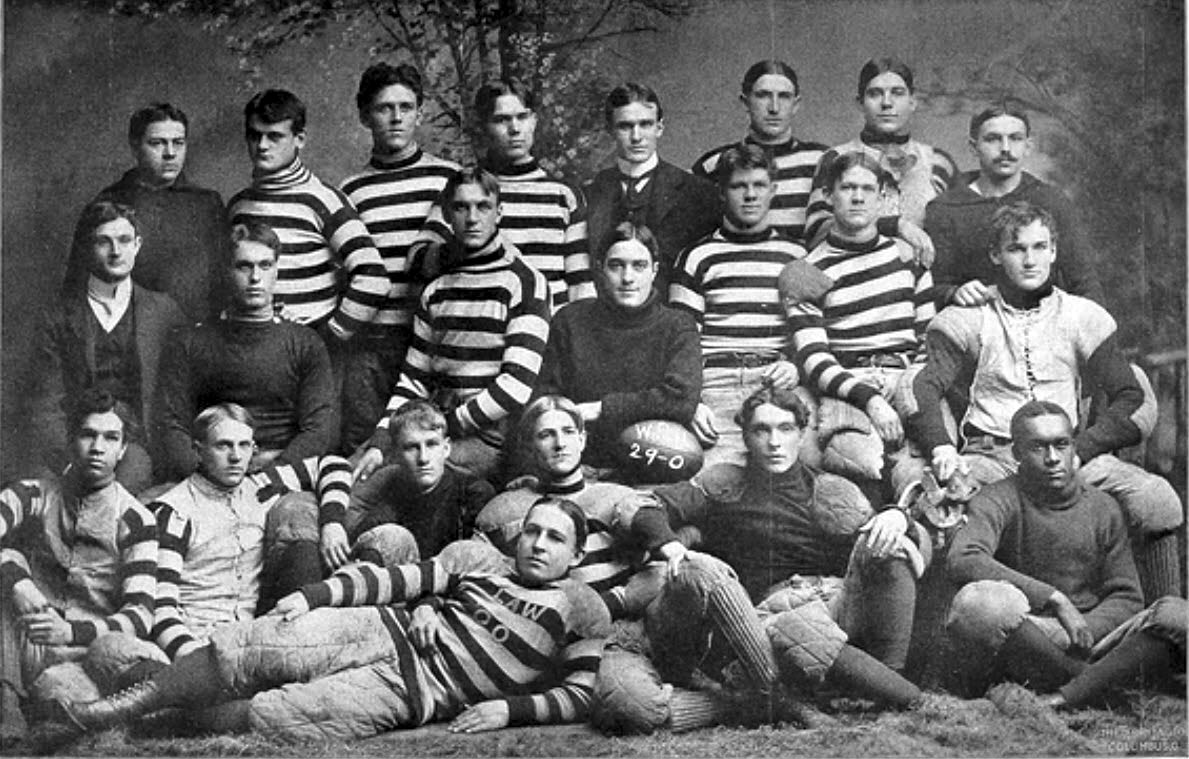
Coach MacAndrew, top row, fourth from the right, with his 1898 Western Reserve football team

MacAndrew began his coaching career in 1898 for Bowdoin, coaching one game before departing prior to game against Harvard. During the same season, he moved to Cleveland to coach Western Reserve, where he remained for two seasons.

MacAndrew coached for several years at high schools in Toledo, Ohio, and in Alameda, Oakland, and Berkeley in California. In 1915, he returned to college football, coaching at Saint Mary's College of California for two seasons.

== Later life and death ==
MacAndrew later worked as a safety engineer for the Cities Service Refining Company in East Braintree, Massachusetts. He died on August 15, 1937, at his home in Braintree.

== Head coaching record ==
Year	Team	Overall	Conference	Standing	Bowl/playoffs
Bowdoin (Independent) (1898)
1898	Bowdoin	1–0			
Western Reserve (Independent) (1898–1899)
1898	Western Reserve	5–3			
1899	Western Reserve	5–4			
Western Reserve:		10–7			
Saint Mary's (Independent) (1915–1916)
1915	Saint Mary's	3–7			
1916	Saint Mary's	5–4–1			
Saint Mary's:		8–11–1			
Total:		19–18–1			
