= William Blaine =

American football player and coach (d. 1905)

Biographical details
- Died: 1905

Playing career
- 1896: Kansas

Coaching career (HC unless noted)
- 1905: South Dakota State

Head coaching record
- Overall: 2–3

William M. Blaine (died 1905) was an American college football player and coach. He served as the head football coach at South Dakota State University in 1905, compiling a record of 2–3. Blaine played college football at the University of Kansas, lettering in 1896. Blaine died just one week after the football season ended in 1905.

== Head coaching record ==
| Year | Team | Overall | Conference | Standing | Bowl/playoffs |
|---|---|---|---|---|---|
South Dakota State (Independent) (1905)
| 1905 | South Dakota State | 2–3 | | | |
| South Dakota State: | | 2–3 | | | |
| Total: | | 2–3 | | | |
