= Frank Cavanaugh (American football) =

American football player and coach (1876–1933)

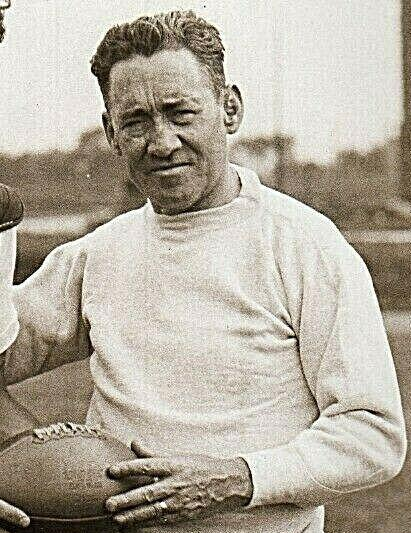
- Cavanaugh in 1931

Biographical details
- Born: April 28, 1876; Worcester, Massachusetts, U.S.
- Died: August 29, 1933 (aged 57); Marshfield, Massachusetts, U.S.

Playing career
- 1896–1897: Dartmouth
- Position: End

Coaching career (HC unless noted)
- 1898: Cincinnati
- 1898–1902: Denver Athletic Club
- 1903–1905: Holy Cross
- 1907–1910: Worcester Academy
- 1911–1916: Dartmouth
- 1919–1926: Boston College
- 1927–1932: Fordham

Head coaching record
- Overall: 146–47–17 (college)
- College Football Hall of Fame; Inducted in 1954 (profile)

Francis William Cavanaugh (April 28, 1876 – August 29, 1933) was an American college football player and coach. He served as the head football coach at University of Cincinnati in 1898, the College of the Holy Cross from 1903 to 1905, Dartmouth College from 1911 to 1916, Boston College from 1919 to 1926, and Fordham University from 1927 to 1932, compiling a career college football coaching record of 146–47–17. Cavanaugh played football at Dartmouth as an end from 1896 to 1897. Nicknamed "Cav" and "The Iron Major," he was inducted into the College Football Hall of Fame as a coach in 1954.

== Early life and playing career ==
Born in Worcester, Massachusetts, Cavanaugh played college football as an end at Dartmouth College from 1896 to 1897, under coach William Wurtenburg.

== Coaching career and military service ==
Cavanaugh served as the head football coach at the University of Cincinnati in 1898, followed with a stint coaching at the Denver Athletic Club from 1898 to 1903. He then returned to his native Worcester to coach at the College of the Holy Cross from 1903 to 1905, followed by high school coaching at Worcester Academy from 1907 to 1910.

Cavanaugh left Worcester to return to college football at his alma mater, Dartmouth from 1911 to 1916. There, he coached Lawrence Whitney, who also attended Worcester Academy when Cavanaugh coached there. Cavanaugh left Dartmouth in 1917 to return to Holy Cross. However, before the football season began, Cavanaugh entered the United States Army to serve during World War I. He rose to the rank of major and was seriously wounded during the Meuse–Argonne offensive on October 23, 1918. Shellfire broke his cheek, nose, and skull, all of which contributed to later blindness.

In 1919, Cavanaugh published a book entitled Inside Football.

Cavanaugh's final two coaching stints were at Boston College from 1919 to 1926 and Fordham University from 1927 to 1932. At Fordham, he implemented the T formation on offense.

== Death and honors ==
At the time of his death in 1933, Cavanaugh was bankrupt. He was survived by his widow, Florence Ayres, and their seven children.

On October 25, 1943, a biographical film about Cavanaugh's life was released by RKO Pictures titled The Iron Major, based on his wife's recollections. The actor Pat O'Brien portrayed Cavanaugh in the main role. In 1954, Cavanaugh was posthumously inducted into the College Football Hall of Fame as a coach.

== Head coaching record ==
=== College ===
| Year | Team | Overall | Conference | Standing | Bowl/playoffs |
|---|---|---|---|---|---|
Cincinnati (Independent) (1898)
| 1898 | Cincinnati | 6–1–2 | | | |
| Cincinnati: | | 5–1–3 | | | |
Holy Cross (Independent) (1903–1905)
| 1903 | Holy Cross | 8–2 | | | |
| 1904 | Holy Cross | 2–5–2 | | | |
| 1905 | Holy Cross | 6–3 | | | |
| Holy Cross: | | 16–10–2 | | | |
Dartmouth (Independent) (1911–1916)
| 1911 | Dartmouth | 8–2 | | | |
| 1912 | Dartmouth | 7–2 | | | |
| 1913 | Dartmouth | 7–1 | | | |
| 1914 | Dartmouth | 8–1 | | | |
| 1915 | Dartmouth | 7–1–1 | | | |
| 1916 | Dartmouth | 5–2–2 | | | |
| Dartmouth: | | 42–9–3 | | | |
Boston College Eagles (Independent) (1919–1926)
| 1919 | Boston College | 5–3 | | | |
| 1920 | Boston College | 8–0 | | | |
| 1921 | Boston College | 4–3–1 | | | |
| 1922 | Boston College | 6–2–1 | | | |
| 1923 | Boston College | 7–1–1 | | | |
| 1924 | Boston College | 6–3 | | | |
| 1925 | Boston College | 6–2 | | | |
| 1926 | Boston College | 6–0–2 | | | |
| Boston College: | | 48–14–5 | | | |
Fordham Maroon/Rams (Independent) (1927–1932)
| 1927 | Fordham | 3–5 | | | |
| 1928 | Fordham | 4–5 | | | |
| 1929 | Fordham | 7–0–2 | | | |
| 1930 | Fordham | 8–1 | | | |
| 1931 | Fordham | 6–1–2 | | | |
| 1932 | Fordham | 6–2 | | | |
| Fordham: | | 34–14–4 | | | |
| Total: | | 146–47–17 | | | |
