= Kalita E. Leighton =

American judge

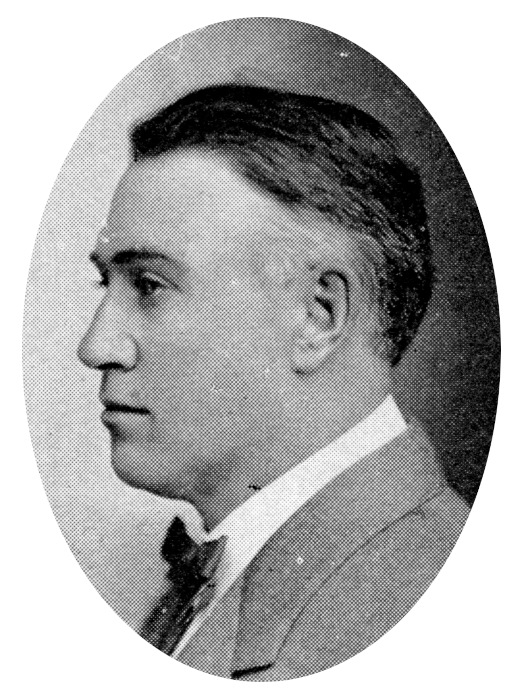

Biographical details
- Born: September 13, 1871; Putnam County, Missouri, U.S.
- Died: January 10, 1928 (aged 56); Minot, North Dakota, U.S.
- Education: Iowa (JD 1896)

Playing career
- 1894–1896: Iowa
- Position: Guard

Coaching career (HC unless noted)
- 1898: Iowa State Teachers

Head coaching record
- Overall: 4–0–1

Kalita Elton Leighton (September 13, 1871 – January 10, 1928) was an American attorney, a judge, and college football player and coach.

== College football career ==
Leighton played college football at the University of Iowa, where he was a law student, from 1894 to 1896. He served as the team captain of the 1895 Iowa Hawkeyes football team.

In 1898, Leighton served as the head football coach at the University of Northern Iowa – then known as Iowa State Normal School - compiling a record of 4–0–1.

== Legal career ==
In 1911, Leighton was appointed to as a judge of the Eighth Judicial District by the Governor of North Dakota, John Burke, and in 1920, he was appointed as Assistant Attorney General of North Dakota.

== Head coaching record ==
Year	Team	Overall	Conference	Standing	Bowl/playoffs
Iowa State Normal (Independent) (1898)
1898	Iowa State Normal	4–0–1			
Iowa State Normal:		4–0–1			
Total:		4–0–1			
