= South Dakota–South Dakota State football rivalry =

Collegiate football rivalry

- South Dakota Coyotes South Dakota State Jackrabbits
- First meeting: 1889; South Dakota 6, South Dakota State 6
- Latest meeting: October 31, 2026; South Dakota State 31, South Dakota 21
- Next meeting: 2027

Statistics
- Total meetings: 119
- All-time series: South Dakota State leads, 59–53–7
- Largest victory: South Dakota, 73–6 (1912)
- Longest win streak: South Dakota State, 10 (2001–2018)
- Current win streak: South Dakota State, 1 (2026–present)

Locations of South Dakota and South Dakota State

The South Dakota–South Dakota State football rivalry (also the South Dakota Showdown Series or the Interstate Series) between the South Dakota Coyotes and the South Dakota State Jackrabbits is a yearly rivalry match-up in football between the two largest public universities in the state of South Dakota: the University of South Dakota in Vermillion and South Dakota State University in Brookings.

== History ==
South Dakota and South Dakota State are both members of the Missouri Valley Football Conference in the FCS. The football series began in 1889 and has been played a total of 119 times as of 2025. Previously, both schools were long-time members of the Division II North Central Conference where the rivalry game played almost yearly. With the upgrade of both programs to Division I FCS (SDSU in 2004 and USD in 2008), the rivalry halted between 2003 until 2012. The series has returned to being a yearly game with both teams playing each other as part of MVFC play. It is also the oldest rivalry in college football, between two public universities, in the same state, that have a game named "University of _ vs. _ State University."

== Stadiums ==
The majority of the series' games have been played in either team's home stadiums in Vermillion (South Dakota) or Brookings (South Dakota State). Three games (1919, 1920, and 1933) played on a neutral field in Sioux Falls. Since the 1979 season, the Coyotes have hosted their games at the DakotaDome (9,100 seats); previously, they played at Darwin Inman Memorial Stadium. The Jackrabbits played home games at Coughlin–Alumni Stadium from 1962 until the 2015 season. South Dakota State's football team has played in its new stadium Dana J. Dykhouse Stadium (19,340 seats) since 2016.

== Game results ==
The numbers represent what national ranking each team was at the time of the game.

| South Dakota victories | South Dakota State victories | Tie games |

| No. | Date | Location | Winner | Score |
|---|---|---|---|---|
| 1 | 1889 | Sioux Falls, SD | Tie | 6–6 |
| 2 | November 16, 1900 | Brookings, SD | South Dakota | 17–0 |
| 3 | November 21, 1901 | Vermillion, SD | South Dakota | 22–0 |
| 4 | November 20, 1902 | Brookings, SD | South Dakota | 10–0 |
| 5 | November 4, 1904 | Vermillion, SD | Tie | 6–6 |
| 6 | November 21, 1905 | Brookings, SD | South Dakota | 17–0 |
| 7 | November 22, 1906 | Vermillion, SD | South Dakota | 22–0 |
| 8 | November 7, 1910 | Vermillion, SD | South Dakota | 33–0 |
| 9 | October 14, 1911 | Brookings, SD | South Dakota | 15–6 |
| 10 | October 26, 1912 | Vermillion, SD | South Dakota | 73–6 |
| 11 | October 3, 1914 | Brookings, SD | South Dakota | 12–0 |
| 12 | November 6, 1915 | Brookings, SD | South Dakota | 7–0 |
| 13 | November 22, 1919 | Sioux Falls, SD | South Dakota State | 13–6 |
| 14 | November 13, 1920 | Sioux Falls, SD | South Dakota | 7–3 |
| 15 | November 12, 1921 | Vermillion, SD | South Dakota State | 9–0 |
| 16 | October 28, 1922 | Brookings, SD | Tie | 7–7 |
| 17 | October 27, 1923 | Vermillion, SD | South Dakota State | 7–0 |
| 18 | November 1, 1924 | Brookings, SD | South Dakota State | 10–3 |
| 19 | October 31, 1925 | Vermillion, SD | South Dakota State | 7–0 |
| 20 | October 30, 1926 | Brookings, SD | Tie | 0–0 |
| 21 | October 29, 1927 | Vermillion, SD | South Dakota | 16–12 |
| 22 | October 27, 1928 | Brookings, SD | South Dakota State | 13–0 |
| 23 | October 26, 1929 | Vermillion, SD | South Dakota State | 6–0 |
| 24 | October 25, 1930 | Brookings, SD | South Dakota State | 13–6 |
| 25 | October 31, 1931 | Vermillion, SD | South Dakota | 10–0 |
| 26 | October 22, 1932 | Brookings, SD | Tie | 0–0 |
| 27 | October 28, 1933 | Vermillion, SD | South Dakota State | 14–0 |
| 28 | November 18, 1933 | Sioux Falls, SD | South Dakota | 6–0 |
| 29 | October 27, 1934 | Brookings, SD | South Dakota State | 19–0 |
| 30 | October 26, 1935 | Vermillion, SD | South Dakota | 7–2 |
| 31 | October 31, 1936 | Brookings, SD | South Dakota | 6–0 |
| 32 | October 30, 1937 | Vermillion, SD | South Dakota | 12–2 |
| 33 | October 29, 1938 | Brookings, SD | South Dakota | 7–0 |
| 34 | October 28, 1939 | Vermillion, SD | South Dakota | 21–7 |
| 35 | October 26, 1940 | Brookings, SD | South Dakota | 26–0 |
| 36 | October 25, 1941 | Vermillion, SD | South Dakota | 40–0 |
| 37 | October 24, 1942 | Brookings, SD | South Dakota | 7–0 |
| 38 | October 26, 1946 | Vermillion, SD | South Dakota State | 20–0 |
| 39 | October 25, 1947 | Brookings, SD | South Dakota | 26–7 |
| 40 | October 30, 1948 | Vermillion, SD | South Dakota | 33–0 |
| 41 | October 29, 1949 | Brookings, SD | South Dakota State | 27–25 |
| 42 | October 28, 1950 | Vermillion, SD | South Dakota State | 54–28 |
| 43 | October 27, 1951 | Brookings, SD | South Dakota | 26–6 |
| 44 | October 25, 1952 | Vermillion, SD | Tie | 21–21 |
| 45 | October 31, 1953 | Brookings, SD | South Dakota State | 25–0 |
| 46 | October 30, 1954 | Vermillion, SD | South Dakota State | 20–19 |
| 47 | October 29, 1955 | Brookings, SD | South Dakota State | 27–7 |
| 48 | October 20, 1956 | Vermillion, SD | South Dakota | 19–14 |
| 49 | October 19, 1957 | Brookings, SD | South Dakota State | 21–13 |
| 50 | October 18, 1958 | Vermillion, SD | South Dakota | 28–7 |
| 51 | October 17, 1959 | Brookings, SD | South Dakota State | 12–7 |
| 52 | October 15, 1960 | Vermillion, SD | South Dakota State | 28–7 |
| 53 | October 21, 1961 | Brookings, SD | South Dakota State | 34–6 |
| 54 | October 20, 1962 | Vermillion, SD | South Dakota State | 24–0 |
| 55 | October 19, 1963 | Brookings, SD | South Dakota State | 61–0 |
| 56 | October 17, 1964 | Vermillion, SD | South Dakota | 10–7 |
| 57 | October 16, 1965 | Brookings, SD | South Dakota State | 30–14 |
| 58 | October 22, 1966 | Vermillion, SD | South Dakota State | 22–18 |
| 59 | October 21, 1967 | Brookings, SD | South Dakota State | 42–14 |
| 60 | October 19, 1968 | Vermillion, SD | South Dakota | 55–32 |

| No. | Date | Location | Winner | Score |
|---|---|---|---|---|
| 61 | October 18, 1969 | Brookings, SD | South Dakota State | 20–14 |
| 62 | October 17, 1970 | Vermillion, SD | South Dakota | 26–0 |
| 63 | October 16, 1971 | Brookings, SD | South Dakota | 37–18 |
| 64 | October 21, 1972 | Vermillion, SD | South Dakota | 42–27 |
| 65 | October 20, 1973 | Brookings, SD | South Dakota | 36–10 |
| 66 | October 19, 1974 | Vermillion, SD | South Dakota | 20–6 |
| 67 | October 18, 1975 | Brookings, SD | South Dakota State | 24–22 |
| 68 | October 23, 1976 | Vermillion, SD | Tie | 17–17 |
| 69 | October 22, 1977 | Brookings, SD | South Dakota | 15–10 |
| 70 | October 14, 1978 | Brookings, SD | South Dakota | 24–7 |
| 71 | October 6, 1979 | Brookings, SD | South Dakota State | 26–21 |
| 72 | November 10, 1979 | Vermillion, SD | South Dakota State | 33–28 |
| 73 | September 27, 1980 | Brookings, SD | South Dakota State | 21–13 |
| 74 | November 8, 1980 | Vermillion, SD | South Dakota | 16–7 |
| 75 | September 19, 1981 | Brookings, SD | South Dakota State | 21–20 |
| 76 | November 7, 1981 | Vermillion, SD | South Dakota | 28–16 |
| 77 | September 11, 1982 | Brookings, SD | South Dakota State | 20–7 |
| 78 | October 30, 1982 | Vermillion, SD | South Dakota | 31–6 |
| 79 | October 29, 1983 | Brookings, SD | South Dakota | 48–23 |
| 80 | October 27, 1984 | Vermillion, SD | South Dakota | 45–42 |
| 81 | September 14, 1985 | Vermillion, SD | South Dakota | 33–18 |
| 82 | October 19, 1985 | Brookings, SD | South Dakota State | 24–12 |
| 83 | September 13, 1986 | Brookings, SD | South Dakota | 26–14 |
| 84 | October 18, 1986 | Vermillion, SD | South Dakota | 51–39 |
| 85 | September 26, 1987 | Brookings, SD | South Dakota | 30–21 |
| 86 | September 24, 1988 | Vermillion, SD | South Dakota | 22–21 |
| 87 | September 9, 1989 | Vermillion, SD | South Dakota State | 14–7 |
| 88 | October 7, 1989 | Brookings, SD | South Dakota | 35–13 |
| 89 | September 8, 1990 | Brookings, SD | South Dakota State | 24–3 |
| 90 | October 6, 1990 | Vermillion, SD | South Dakota State | 16–14 |
| 91 | September 14, 1991 | Vermillion, SD | South Dakota State | 19–7 |
| 92 | October 12, 1991 | Brookings, SD | South Dakota State | 21–18 |
| 93 | September 12, 1992 | Brookings, SD | South Dakota State | 13–0 |
| 94 | October 10, 1992 | Vermillion, SD | South Dakota State | 31–21 |
| 95 | October 23, 1993 | Vermillion, SD | South Dakota | 29–7 |
| 96 | October 22, 1994 | Brookings, SD | South Dakota State | 26–10 |
| 97 | October 7, 1995 | Vermillion, SD | South Dakota State | 31–3 |
| 98 | October 12, 1996 | Brookings, SD | South Dakota State | 28–17 |
| 99 | October 4, 1997 | Vermillion, SD | South Dakota | 21–3 |
| 100 | October 3, 1998 | Brookings, SD | South Dakota State | 24–10 |
| 101 | November 6, 1999 | Vermillion, SD | South Dakota State | 43–30 |
| 102 | November 4, 2000 | Brookings, SD | South Dakota | 41–28 |
| 103 | October 27, 2001 | Vermillion, SD | South Dakota State | 20–3 |
| 104 | November 2, 2002 | Brookings, SD | South Dakota State | 27–20 |
| 105 | October 25, 2003 | Vermillion, SD | South Dakota State | 22–11 |
| 106 | November 17, 2012 | Brookings, SD | #21 South Dakota State | 31–8 |
| 107 | November 16, 2013 | Vermillion, SD | #19 South Dakota State | 27–12 |
| 108 | November 22, 2014 | Brookings, SD | #16 South Dakota State | 37–14 |
| 109 | November 14, 2015 | Vermillion, SD | #5 South Dakota State | 30–23 |
| 110 | November 16, 2016 | Brookings, SD | #11 South Dakota State | 28–21 |
| 111 | November 18, 2017 | Vermillion, SD | #6 South Dakota State | 31–28 |
| 112 | November 17, 2018 | Brookings, SD | #5 South Dakota State | 49–27 |
| 113 | November 23, 2019 | Vermillion, SD | South Dakota | 24–21 |
| 114 | November 13, 2021 | Vermillion, SD | #19 South Dakota | 23–20 |
| 115 | October 8, 2022 | Brookings, SD | #2 South Dakota State | 28–3 |
| 116 | October 28, 2023 | Vermillion, SD | #1 South Dakota State | 37–3 |
| 117 | October 26, 2024 | Brookings, SD | #3 South Dakota State | 20–17^{OT} |
| 118 | November 8, 2025 | Vermillion, SD | #22 South Dakota | 24–17 |
| 119 | October 31, 2026 | Brookings, SD | #5 South Dakota State | 31–21 |
Series: South Dakota State leads 59–53–7

== See also ==
- List of NCAA college football rivalry games
- List of most-played college football series in NCAA Division I
