= Fred DuBridge =

American football coach (1872–1959)

Biographical details
- Born: September 28, 1872; Aurora, Kansas, U.S.
- Died: January 29, 1959 (aged 86); San Jose, California, U.S.
- Education: Western Secretarial Industrial and Training School (1896)

Coaching career (HC unless noted)
- 1898: Indiana State Normal
- 1904–1905: Cornell (IA)

Head coaching record
- Overall: 6–14–1

Frederick Alvin DuBridge (September 28, 1872 – January 29, 1959) was an American college football coach. He served as the head coach at Indiana State Normal School in 1898 and at Cornell College in Mount Vernon, Iowa from 1904 to 1905.

DuBridge was the father of California Institute of Technology president Lee Alvin DuBridge.
