= 1898 Michigan Agricultural Aggies football team =

American college football season

1898 Michigan Agricultural Aggies football
- Conference: Michigan Intercollegiate Athletic Association
- Record: 4–3 (4–1 MIAA)
- Head coach: Henry Keep (2nd season)
- Captain: John H. Vanderstolpe

1898 Michigan Intercollegiate Athletic Association football standings
	Conf.					Overall
Team	W		L		T	W		L		T
Kalamazoo $	5	–	0	–	0	7	–	0	–	0
Hillsdale	2	–	0	–	0	4	–	1	–	0
Michigan Agricultural	4	–	1	–	0	4	–	3	–	0
Michigan State Normal	0	–	3	–	0	1	–	5	–	2
Olivet	0	–	3	–	0	0	–	5	–	0
Albion	0	–	4	–	0	1	–	6	–	0
$ – Conference champion

The 1898 Michigan Agricultural Aggies football team represented Michigan Agricultural College (MAC) as a member of the Michigan Intercollegiate Athletic Association (MIAA) the 1898 college football season. In their second year under coach Henry Keep, the Aggies compiled an overall record of 4–3 and outscored their opponents 142 to 127. Coach Keep was an engineering student who had transferred from the University of Michigan.

The 1898 season also featured the first installment of the Michigan–Michigan State football rivalry; Michigan won the game on a Wednesday at Ann Arbor, Michigan, by 39 to 0 score. Three days after losing to Michigan, the Aggies also lost the second installment of the Michigan State–Notre Dame football rivalry; Notre Dame won the game at South Bend, Indiana, by 53 to 0 score.

== Schedule ==
Date	Time	Opponent	Site	Result	Attendance	Source
October 8		at Michigan State Normal	Ypsilanti, MI	W 11–6		
October 12		at Michigan*	Regents Field; Ann Arbor, MI (rivalry)	L 0–39		
October 15		at Notre Dame*	Brownson Hall field; Notre Dame, IN (rivalry)	L 0–53		
October 22		Albion	East Lansing, MI	W 62–6		
October 29		at Olivet	Olivet, MI	W 45–0		
November 19		Michigan State Normal	East Lansing, MI	W 24–6		
November 24	2:30 p.m.	at Kalamazoo	Kalamazoo, MI	L 0–17	1,000	
*Non-conference game

== Game summaries ==
=== Michigan ===
The 1898 season marked the first game played in the intrastate rivalry between Michigan and Michigan State. The teams met in Ann Arbor on October 12, 1898, and Michigan won, 39 to 0. The Detroit Free Press wrote that the game was "essentially a practice game," as Michigan played 25 different players during the game. Charles Widman scored two touchdowns and was "the strongest ground-gainer" for Michigan. In the second half, Keena also kicked a field goal from a place-kick, "the first time a Michigan eleven has ever scored in that fashion." The game was played in 20-minute halves. The referee was J. C. Knight.

After the 1898 shutout, Michigan sent its freshman team against Michigan Agricultural for the next three years. The two rivals have played each other more than 100 times since the inaugural meeting in 1898.
