= List of Detroit Titans head football coaches =

The Detroit Titans football program was a college football team that represents University of Detroit Mercy as an "independent" program and also in the Missouri Valley Conference, a part of the NCAA University Division. The team has had 18 head coaches since its first recorded football game in 1891. The final coach was John Idzik who first took the position for the 1962 season and ended his duties at the end of the final season in 1964.

== Key ==
Key to symbols in coaches list
General		Overall		Conference		Postseason (Note: Although the first Rose Bowl Game was played in 1902, it has been continuously played since the 1916 game, and is recognized as the oldest bowl game by the NCAA. "—" indicates any season prior to 1916 when postseason games were not played.)	
No.	Order of coaches (Note: A running total of the number of head coaches, with coaches who served separate tenures being counted only once. Interim head coaches are represented with "Int" and are not counted in the running total. "—" indicates the team played but either without a coach or no coach is on record. "X" indicates an interim year without play.)	GC	Games coached	CW	Conference wins	PW	Postseason wins
DC	Division championships	OW	Overall wins	CL	Conference losses	PL	Postseason losses
CC	Conference championships	OL	Overall losses	CT	Conference ties	PT	Postseason ties
NC	National championships	OT	Overall ties (Note: Overtime rules in college football were introduced in 1996, making ties impossible in the period since.)	C%	Conference winning percentage		
†	Elected to the College Football Hall of Fame	O%	Overall winning percentage (Note: When computing the win–loss percentage, a tie counts as half a win and half a loss.)				

== Coaches ==
Statistics correct as of the end of the 1964 college football season, the last season of intercollegiate play (not counting club football).

No.	Name	Term	GC	OW	OL	OT	O%	CW	CL	CT	C%	PW	PL	CCs	NCs	Awards
0	Unknown	1891	1	1	0	0	1.000	—	—	—		—	—	—	—	
1	William S. Robinson	1896–1899	20	13	5	2	.700	—	—	—		—	—	—	—	
2	John C. Mackey	1900–1901	12	6	6	0	.500	—	—	—		—	—	—	—	
3	Edward J. Ryan	1902, 1906	13	7	5	1	.577	—	—	—		—	—	—	—	
4	W. Alfred Debo	1903–1904	12	6	6	0	.500	—	—	—		—	—	—	—	
5	George A. Kelly	1907–1910	14	7	5	2	.571	—	—	—		—	—	—	—	
6	Royal R. Campbell	1911–1912	15	8	6	1	.567	—	—	—		—	—	—	—	
7	George M. Lawton	1913–1914	15	6	6	3	.500	—	—	—		—	—	—	—	
8	Harry Costello	1915–1916	13	4	7	2	.385	—	—	—		—	—	—	—	
9	James F. Duffy	1917–1924	56	43	12	1	.777	—	—	—		—	—	—	—	
10	Germany Schulz^{†}	1923	9	4	3	2	.556	—	—	—		—	—	—	—	
11	Gus Dorais^{†}	1925–1942	168	113	48	7	.693	—	—	—		—	—	—	1	
12	Chuck Baer	1945–1950	57	35	21	1	.623	—	—	—		—	—	1	—	
13	Dutch Clark^{†}	1951–1953	30	13	17	0	.433	—	—	—		—	—	1	—	
14	Wally Fromhart	1954–1958	46	19	25	2	.435	—	—	—		—	—	1	—	
15	Jim Miller	1959–1961	28	18	10	0	.643	—	—	—		—	—	—	—	
16	John Idzik	1962–1964	28	6	21	1	.232	—	—	—		—	—	—	—	
