= John Idzik =

American football player and coach (1928–2013)

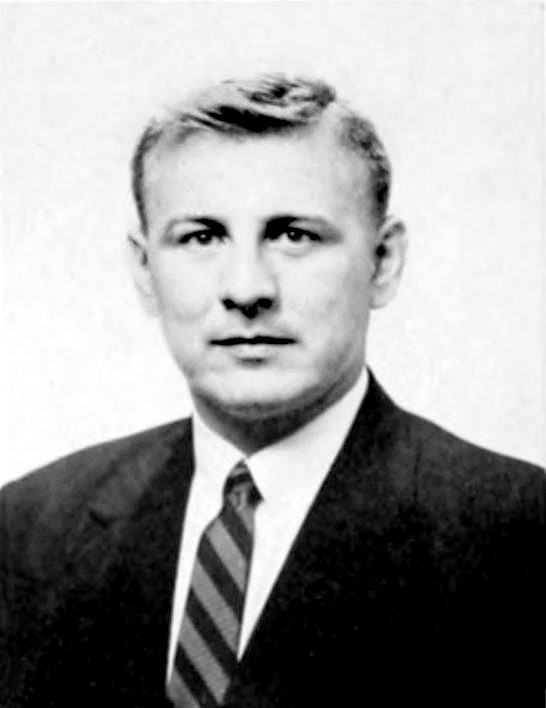
- Idzik as Maryland assistant in 1957

Biographical details
- Born: June 25, 1928; Philadelphia, Pennsylvania, U.S.
- Died: December 7, 2013 (aged 85); Chadds Ford, Pennsylvania, U.S.

Playing career
- 1947–1950: Maryland
- Position: Back

Coaching career (HC unless noted)
- 1954: Tennessee (asst. freshman)
- 1955: Ottawa Rough Riders (backs)
- 1956–1958: Maryland (line)
- 1959–1961: Detroit (backs)
- 1962–1964: Detroit
- 1965: Tulane (OC)
- 1966–1969: Miami Dolphins (backs)
- 1970–1972: Baltimore Colts (off. backs)
- 1973–1976: Philadelphia Eagles (OC)
- 1977–1979: New York Jets (OC)
- 1980–1981: Baltimore Colts (off. backs)

Head coaching record
- Overall: 6–21–1

John Joseph Idzik Sr. (June 25, 1928 – December 7, 2013) was an American football player and coach. He was the head coach of the University of Detroit football team until the school discontinued its program in 1964. He held assistant coaching positions at the University of Tennessee, University of Maryland, Tulane University, in the National Football League (NFL) with the Miami Dolphins, Baltimore Colts, Philadelphia Eagles, New York Jets, and in the Canadian Football League (CFL) with the Ottawa Rough Riders. Idzik played college football at the University of Maryland.

== Early life and college ==
Idzik, a native of Bridesburg in Philadelphia, Pennsylvania, attended Northeast Catholic High School, where the Philadelphia Daily News described him as "one of this city's top high school football players". After the 1945 season, he was selected as a first team All-Scholastic back by the Philadelphia Bulletin which honored the best high school players in the five-county area in and around Philadelphia. He was also voted to the Coaches All-Catholic League team in 1944 (2nd team) and 1945 (1st team). Idzik was also the catcher for North Catholic's City Championship baseball team of 1945. After graduating high school in 1946, he enrolled at the University of Maryland in 1947. Idzik played on the football team and was a four-year letterman as a back from 1947 to 1950. Idzik was also invited to play for the South squad in the third annual Mahi Shrine North-South College All-Star Football Classic, a charity game held on Christmas night at Orange Bowl Stadium in Miami. The 1951 yearbook, The Terrapin, described Idzik as a "backfield bulwark who was demon on defense—Could have starred on offense but was defensive necessity. Saved more touchdowns than most backs scored" He also played varsity baseball for the University of Maryland. He was a member of the Phi Delta Theta fraternity. Idzik graduated from Maryland in 1951 and went on to serve in the United States Marine Corps from 1951 to 1953.

== Coaching career ==
In 1954, the University of Tennessee hired Idzik as an assistant football coach for its freshman team. Having played college football under Jim Tatum, Idzik was the split-T expert on the Tennessee staff. He resigned in February 1955 to take a job with the Ottawa Rough Riders in the Canadian Football League.

At Ottawa, he served as the backfield and top assistant coach under head coach Chan Caldwell. The two personalities clashed however, which resulted in Idzik's dismissal midseason in October. The disagreements, over play-calling and which players to dress, began after the first preseason game in early August and resulted in three meetings between the parties and the club management, the last of which was called at the request of the team's players. Idzik accepted payment of a year's salary of $7,000 upon his termination.

In January 1956, Idzik was hired as the line coach at his alma mater, to work under Tommy Mont, who had been promoted to head coach after Jim Tatum's departure. He served in that capacity for three seasons.

=== Detroit ===
After Maryland, Idzik moved on to take an assistant coaching position at the University of Detroit. He worked as backfield coach under Jim Miller for three seasons, until promoted to head coach in 1962. He replaced Miller who had resigned to take over at Boston College. As head coach, Detroit failed to achieve a winning season and Idzik amassed a record of 6–21–1.

At the time of his hiring, Detroit indicated that it might discontinue its football program if its gate receipts did not improve. After the 1964 season, the university terminated its sponsorship of the sport. Idzik sued the school for $15,000 in a breach of contract suit. Half of the requested amount consisted was for "services rendered" and the other half for damages. In July 1965, Idzik and the University of Detroit came to an agreement under which he was awarded $1,400.

He was then hired as the chief offensive coach at Tulane University. Idzik was considered a candidate for the Tulane head coach post after Tommy O'Boyle resigned, but the job ultimately went to Jim Pittman.

=== NFL assistant coach ===
Idzik then moved on to the National Football League, where he joined the staff of the Miami Dolphins as its backfield coach. He convinced the staff to select halfback Jim Kiick in the 1969 NFL/AFL draft. In contrast to some of the other staff members earlier assessments, Idzik said, "He's not slow. He has got good speed and power and balance and a good head on his shoulders." In 1967, Idzik was a frontrunner for the vacant head coaching job at his alma mater, which went instead to fellow alumnus Bob Ward.

In 1970, he was hired by the Baltimore Colts as its offensive backfield coach. He was on the staff that guided Baltimore to win Super Bowl V after the 1970 season. On December 20, 1972, Colts general manager Joe Thomas, who wanted "a new approach, a new look," dismissed the entire coaching staff including Idzik and interim head coach John Sandusky.

Idzik and Sandusky were subsequently hired as assistants by the Philadelphia Eagles in January 1973. After the Eagles posted a 4–10 record in 1976, Idzik resigned as offensive coordinator, as did defensive coordinator John Mazur.

The New York Jets hired both Idzik and Mazur in February 1977. With the Jets, he was responsible for the development of quarterbacks Richard Todd and Matt Robinson. As part of the New York staff, Idzik coached as the offensive coordinator in the 1978 Senior Bowl. In 1978, Idzik expressed an interest in the vacant head coaching position with the New York Giants, but he did not receive the job.

Idzik resigned from the Jets after the 1979 season. The Associated Press reported that he did not get along with head coach Walt Michaels, and that he favored embattled quarterback Richard Todd over back-up Matt Robinson. He returned to the Baltimore Colts for the 1980 season. In 1982, Frank Kush took over as head coach and dismissed the entire staff.

After his coaching career, he and his wife lived in Chadds Ford, Pennsylvania. In 1990, he intended to return from retirement to become head coach of the Rome franchise of the new International League of American Football, but the league folded before its first season.

== Personal life ==
His son, John Idzik, Jr., has held front office positions in the NFL with the Tampa Bay Buccaneers, Arizona Cardinals and Seattle Seahawks, and also was the general manager of the New York Jets.

John Idzik served in the United States Marine Corps from 1951 to 1953.

Idzik died at his home in Chadds Ford Township, Delaware County, Pennsylvania on December 7, 2013.

== Head coaching record ==
Year	Team	Overall	Conference	Standing	Bowl/playoffs
Detroit Titans (NCAA University Division independent) (1962–1964)
1962	Detroit	1–8			
1963	Detroit	2–6–1			
1964	Detroit	3–7			
Detroit:		6–21–1			
Total:		6–21–1			
