= 1909 Olivet Crimson football team =

American college football season

1909 Olivet Crimson football

MIAA champion
- Conference: Michigan Intercollegiate Athletic Association
- Record: 4–2–1 (4–0 MIAA)
- Head coach: Henry Hall (2nd season)

The 1909 Olivet Crimson football team represented Olivet College during the 1909 college football season.

== Schedule ==
Date	Opponent	Site	Result
October 9	at Notre Dame*	Cartier Field; South Bend, IN	L 0–58
October 16	at Detroit College*		T 0–0
October 23	Kalamazoo	Olivet, MI	W 20–0
October 30	Alma	Olivet, MI	W 30–0
November 6	Hillsdale	Olivet, MI	W 40–0
	Albion	Olivet, MI	W 27–6
November 13	at Michigan Agricultural	College Field; East Lansing, MI	L 0–20
*Non-conference game
