= 1896 Drake Bulldogs football team =

American college football season

1896 Drake Bulldogs football
- Conference: Independent
- Record: 2–3
- Head coach: Fred Rogers (1st season)

1896 Midwestern college football independents records
	Conf.			Overall
Team	W	L	T	W		L		T
Carthage		–		4	–	0	–	0
St. Ignatius College Chicago		–		1	–	0	–	0
Washburn		–		6	–	1	–	1
Iowa Agricultural		–		8	–	2	–	0
Central Michigan		–		3	–	1	–	0
Miami (OH)		–		3	–	1	–	0
Ohio Wesleyan		–		6	–	2	–	0
Detroit College		–		5	–	2	–	0
North Dakota Agricultural		–		3	–	1	–	1
Heidelberg		–		2	–	1	–	0
Ohio		–		4	–	2	–	1
Indiana		–		5	–	3	–	0
Beloit		–		2	–	1	–	3
Butler		–		4	–	3	–	0
Iowa State Normal		–		4	–	3	–	0
Notre Dame		–		4	–	3	–	0
Cincinnati		–		4	–	3	–	1
Wittenberg		–		5	–	4	–	0
Baldwin–Wallace		–		2	–	2	–	0
College of Emporia		–		2	–	3	–	0
Ohio State		–		5	–	5	–	1
Lake Forest		–		3	–	4	–	1
Mount Union		–		3	–	4	–	1
Wabash		–		3	–	4	–	0
Drake		–		2	–	3	–	0
Chicago P&S		–		2	–	4	–	2
Hillsdale		–		2	–	4	–	0
Kansas State		–		0	–	1	–	1
Indiana State Normal		–		0	–	1	–	0
Buchtel		–		0	–	1	–	0
Washington University		–		0	–	2	–	0
Doane		–		0	–	5	–	0
Haskell		–		0	–	5	–	0

The 1896 Drake Bulldogs football team represented Drake University during the 1896 college football season. In its first and only season under head coach Fred Rogers, the team compiled a 2–3 record and was outscored by a total of 98 to 28.

== Schedule ==
Date	Opponent	Site	Result	Source
October 3	at Iowa	Iowa Field; Iowa City, IA	L 0–32	
October 10	at Monmouth (IL)	Monmouth, IL	W 16–10	
October 11	at Monmouth (IL)	Monmouth, IL	W 12–2	
October 24	Grinnell	Des Moines, IA	L 0–48	
November 7	at Knox	Galesburg, IL	L 0–6	
