= 1896 Beloit football team =

American college football season

1896 Beloit football
- Conference: Independent
- Record: 2–2–2
- Head coach: Charles M. Hollister (1st season)
- Captain: Hinckly (fullback)

1896 Midwestern college football independents records
	Conf.			Overall
Team	W	L	T	W		L		T
Carthage		–		4	–	0	–	0
St. Ignatius College Chicago		–		1	–	0	–	0
Washburn		–		6	–	1	–	1
Iowa Agricultural		–		8	–	2	–	0
Central Michigan		–		3	–	1	–	0
Miami (OH)		–		3	–	1	–	0
Ohio Wesleyan		–		6	–	2	–	0
Detroit College		–		5	–	2	–	0
North Dakota Agricultural		–		3	–	1	–	1
Heidelberg		–		2	–	1	–	0
Ohio		–		4	–	2	–	1
Indiana		–		5	–	3	–	0
Beloit		–		2	–	1	–	3
Butler		–		4	–	3	–	0
Iowa State Normal		–		4	–	3	–	0
Notre Dame		–		4	–	3	–	0
Cincinnati		–		4	–	3	–	1
Wittenberg		–		5	–	4	–	0
Baldwin–Wallace		–		2	–	2	–	0
College of Emporia		–		2	–	3	–	0
Ohio State		–		5	–	5	–	1
Lake Forest		–		3	–	4	–	1
Mount Union		–		3	–	4	–	1
Wabash		–		3	–	4	–	0
Drake		–		2	–	3	–	0
Chicago P&S		–		2	–	4	–	2
Hillsdale		–		2	–	4	–	0
Kansas State		–		0	–	1	–	1
Indiana State Normal		–		0	–	1	–	0
Buchtel		–		0	–	1	–	0
Washington University		–		0	–	2	–	0
Doane		–		0	–	5	–	0
Haskell		–		0	–	5	–	0

The 1896 Beloit football team was an American football team that represented Beloit College in the 1896 college football season. Under first-year head coach Charles M. Hollister, Beloit compiled a 2–1–3 record and outscored their opponents 86 or 92 to 24.

== Schedule ==
Date	Opponent	Site	Result	Source
September 26	Whitewater	Beloit, WI	W 32–0	
October 3	Armour Institute	Beloit, WI	W 44–0	
October 10	at Northwestern	Northwestern Athletic Field; Evanston, IL	T 6–6	
October 17	Chicago Physicians and Surgeons	Beloit, WI	T 4–4	
October 31	Wisconsin	Beloit, WI	L 0–6 or 6–6	
November 26	at Notre Dame	Brownson Hall field; Notre Dame, IN	L 0–8	
