= Duncan M. Martin =

American educator and college football coach (1854–1934)

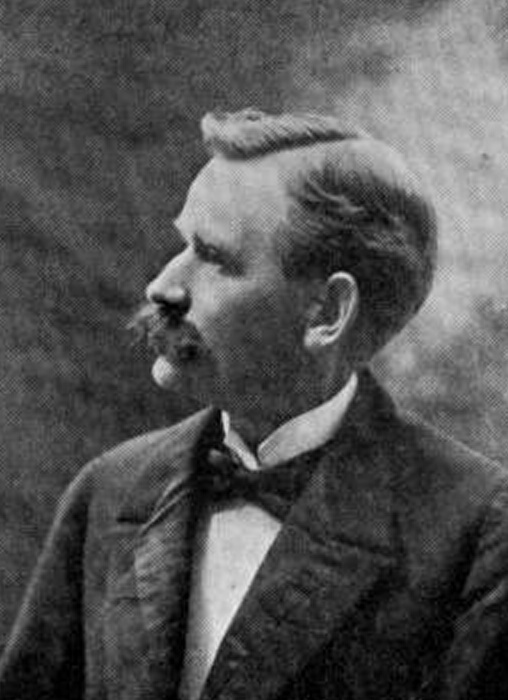

Biographical details
- Born: May 14, 1854; Byron, New York, U.S.
- Died: October 19, 1934 (aged 80); Pasadena, California, U.S.

Coaching career (HC unless noted)
- 1896: Hillsdale
- 1898: Hillsdale

Head coaching record
- Overall: 6–5

Duncan McLaren Martin (May 14, 854 – October 19, 1934) was an American educator and college football coach. He served as the head football at Hillsdale College in Hillsdale, Michigan, in 1896 and again in 1898, compiling a record of 6–5. Martin was also a professor of mathematics at Hillsdale for 11 years before leaving the school in 1903 to manage an irrigation project on the Colorado River in Arizona and California. Before coming to Hillsdale, he was the principal of the public schools in Prescott, Arizona. He later resided in Pasadena, California, where he died, at his home, on October 19, 1934.

== Head coaching record ==
Year	Team	Overall	Conference	Standing	Bowl/playoffs
Hillsdale Dales (Independent) (1896)
1896	Hillsdale	2–4			
Hillsdale Dales (Michigan Intercollegiate Athletic Association) (1898)
1898	Hillsdale	4–1	2–0	2nd	
Hillsdale:		6–5	2–0		
Total:		6–5			
