= 1896 Cincinnati football team =

American college football season

1896 Cincinnati football
- Conference: Independent
- Record: 4–3–1
- Head coach: William Ayres Reynolds (1st season)
- Captain: Lyman Eaton
- Home stadium: League Park

1896 Midwestern college football independents records
	Conf.			Overall
Team	W	L	T	W		L		T
Carthage		–		4	–	0	–	0
St. Ignatius College Chicago		–		1	–	0	–	0
Washburn		–		6	–	1	–	1
Iowa Agricultural		–		8	–	2	–	0
Central Michigan		–		3	–	1	–	0
Miami (OH)		–		3	–	1	–	0
Ohio Wesleyan		–		6	–	2	–	0
Detroit College		–		5	–	2	–	0
North Dakota Agricultural		–		3	–	1	–	1
Heidelberg		–		2	–	1	–	0
Ohio		–		4	–	2	–	1
Indiana		–		5	–	3	–	0
Beloit		–		2	–	1	–	3
Butler		–		4	–	3	–	0
Iowa State Normal		–		4	–	3	–	0
Notre Dame		–		4	–	3	–	0
Cincinnati		–		4	–	3	–	1
Wittenberg		–		5	–	4	–	0
Baldwin–Wallace		–		2	–	2	–	0
College of Emporia		–		2	–	3	–	0
Ohio State		–		5	–	5	–	1
Lake Forest		–		3	–	4	–	1
Mount Union		–		3	–	4	–	1
Wabash		–		3	–	4	–	0
Drake		–		2	–	3	–	0
Chicago P&S		–		2	–	4	–	2
Hillsdale		–		2	–	4	–	0
Kansas State		–		0	–	1	–	1
Indiana State Normal		–		0	–	1	–	0
Buchtel		–		0	–	1	–	0
Washington University		–		0	–	2	–	0
Doane		–		0	–	5	–	0
Haskell		–		0	–	5	–	0

The 1896 Cincinnati football team was an American football team that represented the University of Cincinnati as an independent during the 1896 college football season. Led by William Ayres Reynolds in his first and only season as head coach, Cincinnati compiled a 4–3–1 record. The team played home games at League Park in Cincinnati.

== Schedule ==
Date	Opponent	Site	Result	Attendance	Source
October 2	Miami (OH)	League Park; Cincinnati, OH (rivalry)	L 4–6		
October 10	Ohio State	League Park; Cincinnati, OH	W 8–6	2,000	
October 17	Ohio	Cincinnati, OH	W 52–0		
October 24	Ohio Wesleyan	League Park; Cincinnati, OH	W 6–0		
October 31	at Indiana	Athletic Field; Bloomington, IN	L 0–16		
November 4	at Wittenberg	Springfield, OH	W 6–0		
November 14	Carlisle	League Park; Cincinnati, OH	L 0–28	5,000	
November 26	Centre	League Park; Cincinnati, OH	T 12–12	6,000	
