= 1896 Ohio Green and White football team =

American college football season

1896 Ohio Green and White football
- Conference: Independent
- Record: 4–2–1
- Head coach: Frank Remsburg (1st season)

1896 Midwestern college football independents records
	Conf.			Overall
Team	W	L	T	W		L		T
Carthage		–		4	–	0	–	0
St. Ignatius College Chicago		–		1	–	0	–	0
Washburn		–		6	–	1	–	1
Iowa Agricultural		–		8	–	2	–	0
Central Michigan		–		3	–	1	–	0
Miami (OH)		–		3	–	1	–	0
Ohio Wesleyan		–		6	–	2	–	0
Detroit College		–		5	–	2	–	0
North Dakota Agricultural		–		3	–	1	–	1
Heidelberg		–		2	–	1	–	0
Ohio		–		4	–	2	–	1
Indiana		–		5	–	3	–	0
Beloit		–		2	–	1	–	3
Butler		–		4	–	3	–	0
Iowa State Normal		–		4	–	3	–	0
Notre Dame		–		4	–	3	–	0
Cincinnati		–		4	–	3	–	1
Wittenberg		–		5	–	4	–	0
Baldwin–Wallace		–		2	–	2	–	0
College of Emporia		–		2	–	3	–	0
Ohio State		–		5	–	5	–	1
Lake Forest		–		3	–	4	–	1
Mount Union		–		3	–	4	–	1
Wabash		–		3	–	4	–	0
Drake		–		2	–	3	–	0
Chicago P&S		–		2	–	4	–	2
Hillsdale		–		2	–	4	–	0
Kansas State		–		0	–	1	–	1
Indiana State Normal		–		0	–	1	–	0
Buchtel		–		0	–	1	–	0
Washington University		–		0	–	2	–	0
Doane		–		0	–	5	–	0
Haskell		–		0	–	5	–	0

The 1896 Ohio Green and White football team was an American football team that represented Ohio University as an independent during the 1896 college football season. In its third season of intercollegiate football, Ohio compiled a 4–2–1 record and was outscored by a total of 100 to 70. Frank Rembsburg was the team's head coach; it was Rembsurg's first and only season in the position.

== Schedule ==
Date	Opponent	Site	Result	Source
October 16	at Chillicothe Young Men's Club	East End Amusement Park; Chillicothe, OH	W 12–6	
October 17	at Cincinnati	Union Ball Park; Cincinnati, OH	L 0–52	
	Parker High School		T 0–0	
	Portsmouth		W 18–0	
November 6	Denison	Athens, OH	W 16–12	
November 14	Marietta	Athens, OH	L 6–22	
November 26	at Chillicothe Young Men's Club	Chillicothe, OH	W 22–8	
