= Walter Griffiths (American football) =

American football coach

Playing career
- 1893–1895: Kansas
- Position: Guard

Coaching career (HC unless noted)
- 1896: Washburn

Head coaching record
- Overall: 6–1–1

Walter Griffiths was an American college football player and coach. He was the second head football coach at Washburn University in Topeka, Kansas, serving for one season, in 1896, compiling a record of 6–1–1. Griffiths played football at the University of Kansas as a guard from 1893 to 1895. He graduated from Kansas with the class of 1896 and entered the University of Kansas School of Law.

== Head coaching record ==
Year	Team	Overall	Conference	Standing	Bowl/playoffs
Washburn Ichabods (Independent) (1896)
1896	Washburn	6–1–1			
Washburn:		6–1–1			
Total:		6–1–1			
