= 1896 Chicago Physicians and Surgeons football team =

American collegiate football team

1896 Chicago Physicians and Surgeons football
- Conference: Independent
- Record: 2–4–2

1896 Midwestern college football independents records
	Conf.			Overall
Team	W	L	T	W		L		T
Carthage		–		4	–	0	–	0
St. Ignatius College Chicago		–		1	–	0	–	0
Washburn		–		6	–	1	–	1
Iowa Agricultural		–		8	–	2	–	0
Central Michigan		–		3	–	1	–	0
Miami (OH)		–		3	–	1	–	0
Ohio Wesleyan		–		6	–	2	–	0
Detroit College		–		5	–	2	–	0
North Dakota Agricultural		–		3	–	1	–	1
Heidelberg		–		2	–	1	–	0
Ohio		–		4	–	2	–	1
Indiana		–		5	–	3	–	0
Beloit		–		2	–	1	–	3
Butler		–		4	–	3	–	0
Iowa State Normal		–		4	–	3	–	0
Notre Dame		–		4	–	3	–	0
Cincinnati		–		4	–	3	–	1
Wittenberg		–		5	–	4	–	0
Baldwin–Wallace		–		2	–	2	–	0
College of Emporia		–		2	–	3	–	0
Ohio State		–		5	–	5	–	1
Lake Forest		–		3	–	4	–	1
Mount Union		–		3	–	4	–	1
Wabash		–		3	–	4	–	0
Drake		–		2	–	3	–	0
Chicago P&S		–		2	–	4	–	2
Hillsdale		–		2	–	4	–	0
Kansas State		–		0	–	1	–	1
Indiana State Normal		–		0	–	1	–	0
Buchtel		–		0	–	1	–	0
Washington University		–		0	–	2	–	0
Doane		–		0	–	5	–	0
Haskell		–		0	–	5	–	0

The 1896 Chicago Physicians and Surgeons football team was an American football team that represented the College of Physicians and Surgeons of Chicago in the 1896 college football season. The doctors compiled a 2–4–2 record, and were outscored by their opponents 184 to 56. In a game proclaimed to be the "Western medical school football championship", Chicago P&S forfeited the contest in the 2nd half, because of their refusal to play after a disputed Rush Medical touchdown.

== Schedule ==
Date	Time	Opponent	Site	Result	Attendance	Source
October 8		at Notre Dame	Brownson Hall field; Notre Dame, IN	W 4–0		
October 15		at Michigan	Regents Field; Ann Arbor, MI	L 0–28		
October 17		at Beloit	Beloit, WI	T 4–4		
October 23		Chicago Theology Seminary	Cook County Hospital grounds; Chicago, IL	T 8–8		
October 30		at Northwestern	Evanston, IL	L 6–16		
November 7		Northwestern Dental College	Gaelic athletic grounds; Chicago, IL	W 34–0	300	
November 14	3:20 p.m.	Rush Medical College	Gaelic athletic grounds; Chicago, IL (Western medical college championship)	L 0–106 (forfeit)	1,400	
November 21		Chicago Athletic Association	Athletic Field; Chicago, IL	L 0–12		
