= 1896 Iowa Agricultural Cyclones football team =

American college football season

1896 Iowa Agricultural Cyclones football
- Conference: Independent
- Record: 8–2
- Head coach: Pop Warner (2nd season)
- Captain: James W. Wilson

1896 Midwestern college football independents records
	Conf.			Overall
Team	W	L	T	W		L		T
Carthage		–		4	–	0	–	0
St. Ignatius College Chicago		–		1	–	0	–	0
Washburn		–		6	–	1	–	1
Iowa Agricultural		–		8	–	2	–	0
Central Michigan		–		3	–	1	–	0
Miami (OH)		–		3	–	1	–	0
Ohio Wesleyan		–		6	–	2	–	0
Detroit College		–		5	–	2	–	0
North Dakota Agricultural		–		3	–	1	–	1
Heidelberg		–		2	–	1	–	0
Ohio		–		4	–	2	–	1
Indiana		–		5	–	3	–	0
Beloit		–		2	–	1	–	3
Butler		–		4	–	3	–	0
Iowa State Normal		–		4	–	3	–	0
Notre Dame		–		4	–	3	–	0
Cincinnati		–		4	–	3	–	1
Wittenberg		–		5	–	4	–	0
Baldwin–Wallace		–		2	–	2	–	0
College of Emporia		–		2	–	3	–	0
Ohio State		–		5	–	5	–	1
Lake Forest		–		3	–	4	–	1
Mount Union		–		3	–	4	–	1
Wabash		–		3	–	4	–	0
Drake		–		2	–	3	–	0
Chicago P&S		–		2	–	4	–	2
Hillsdale		–		2	–	4	–	0
Kansas State		–		0	–	1	–	1
Indiana State Normal		–		0	–	1	–	0
Buchtel		–		0	–	1	–	0
Washington University		–		0	–	2	–	0
Doane		–		0	–	5	–	0
Haskell		–		0	–	5	–	0

The 1896 Iowa Agricultural Cyclones football team represented Iowa Agricultural College (later renamed Iowa State University) as an independent during the 1896 college football season. Under head coach Pop Warner, the Cyclones compiled an 8–2 record, shut out seven of ten opponents, and outscored all opponents by a combined total of 303 to 46. James W. Wilson was the team captain.

Between 1892 and 1913, the football team played on a field that later became the site of the university's Parks Library.

== Schedule ==
Date	Opponent	Site	Result
September 4	Iowa Falls, IA	Ames, IA	W 46–0
September 5	Cornell (IA)	Ames, IA	W 50–0
October 2	at Missouri	Rollins Field; Columbia, MO (rivalry)	W 12–0
October 17	at Des Moines YMCA	Des Moines, IA	W 24–16
October 24	at Minnesota	Minneapolis, MN	L 6–18
October 30	Simpson	Ames, IA	W 44-0
November 7	Grinnell	Ames, IA	W 40–0
November 19	at Nebraska	"M" Street Park; Lincoln, NE (rivalry)	L 4–12
November 21	at Des Moines YMCA	Des Moines, IA	W 15–0
November 28	at Eldora	Eldora, IA	W 62–0

== Roster ==
1896 Iowa State Cyclones football
- Frank W. Bouska - Guard (5' 10", 163)
- Philip Damon (5' 7½", 134)
- W. S. "Hank" Dodd - Tackle (5' 9½", 175)
- Frank C. French - Quarterback (5' 6", 150)
- H. O. Fritzel - Guard/quarterback (5' 7", 145)
- Clarence Griffith - End (5' 7", 140)
- M. J. Hammer - Guard (6' 2", 190)
- John Howell - Tackle (5' 10¾", 162)
- F. F. Parker - Back (5' 10½", 160)
- William Parsons - Halfback (5' 10", 165)
- Stephen Rice (5' 8½", 156)
- S. W. Tarr - Guard (5' 11½", 175)
- M. Van Campen - Center (6' 2", 210)
- R. G. Weaver (5' 8½", 140)
- W. W. Wentch - End (5' 9", 135)
- Ben Wilson - Halfback (6' 0", 171)
- James W. Wilson - Fullback (6' 0", 171)
