= 1896 Haskell Indians football team =

American college football season

1896 Haskell Indians football
- Conference: Independent
- Record: 0–5
- Head coach: Arthur Huddleston (pre-season only)

1896 Midwestern college football independents records
	Conf.			Overall
Team	W	L	T	W		L		T
Carthage		–		4	–	0	–	0
St. Ignatius College Chicago		–		1	–	0	–	0
Washburn		–		6	–	1	–	1
Iowa Agricultural		–		8	–	2	–	0
Central Michigan		–		3	–	1	–	0
Miami (OH)		–		3	–	1	–	0
Ohio Wesleyan		–		6	–	2	–	0
Detroit College		–		5	–	2	–	0
North Dakota Agricultural		–		3	–	1	–	1
Heidelberg		–		2	–	1	–	0
Ohio		–		4	–	2	–	1
Indiana		–		5	–	3	–	0
Beloit		–		2	–	1	–	3
Butler		–		4	–	3	–	0
Iowa State Normal		–		4	–	3	–	0
Notre Dame		–		4	–	3	–	0
Cincinnati		–		4	–	3	–	1
Wittenberg		–		5	–	4	–	0
Baldwin–Wallace		–		2	–	2	–	0
College of Emporia		–		2	–	3	–	0
Ohio State		–		5	–	5	–	1
Lake Forest		–		3	–	4	–	1
Mount Union		–		3	–	4	–	1
Wabash		–		3	–	4	–	0
Drake		–		2	–	3	–	0
Chicago P&S		–		2	–	4	–	2
Hillsdale		–		2	–	4	–	0
Kansas State		–		0	–	1	–	1
Indiana State Normal		–		0	–	1	–	0
Buchtel		–		0	–	1	–	0
Washington University		–		0	–	2	–	0
Doane		–		0	–	5	–	0
Haskell		–		0	–	5	–	0

The 1896 Haskell Indians football team was an American football team that represented the Haskell Indian Institute (now known as Haskell Indian Nations University) as an independent during the 1896 college football season. The team compiled a 0–4 record. No record has been found identifying a coach for the team during the regular season, but they were coached during the preseason by former Kansas player Arthur Huddleston.

== Schedule ==
Date	Time	Opponent	Site	Result	Source
September 27		Kansas	Haskell grounds; Lawrence, KS	L 0–32	
October 17	3:00 p.m.	at Kansas second team	McCook Field; Lawrence, KS	L 6–14	
October 30		at Washburn	Athletic Park; Topeka, KS	L 6–8	
November 14		at St. Joseph Tigers	South Sixth Street Park; St. Joseph, MO	L 0–4	
November 26		at College of Emporia	Soden's Field; Emporia, KS	L 6–32	
