= Hillsdale Dales football, 1891–1899 =

American college football seasons

The Hillsdale Dales football teams (later known as the Hillsdale Chargers) represented Hillsdale College in American football during the program's first decade from 1891 to 1899.

Hillsdale and Eastern Michigan University are tied as the fourth oldest college football programs in Michigan, having both commenced play in 1891. Only the University of Michigan, Albion College, and Olivet College have programs that began play prior to 1891. (Kalamazoo College commenced play one year later in 1892.)

== 1891 ==
1891 Hillsdale Dales football
- Conference: Independent
- Record: 0–1
- Head coach: None

The 1891 Hillsdale Dales football team represented Hillsdale College during the 1891 college football season. In their first season fielding an intercollegiate football team, the Hillsdale eleven compiled a 0–1 record, losing its only game of the season, to Albion, by a 34–4 score.

=== Schedule ===
Date	Opponent	Site	Result	Source
November 7	Albion		L 4–34	

== 1892 ==
1892 Hillsdale Dales football
- Conference: Independent
- Record: 3–2–1
- Head coach: None

The 1892 Hillsdale Dales football team represented Hillsdale College as a member of the Michigan Intercollegiate Athletic Association (MIAA) during the 1892 college football season. The team compiled a 3–2–1 record, though two of the victories are omitted from the school's year-by-year results. In addition, the outcome of a November 24 game against Notre Dame is disputed with some sources listing it as a 12–10 victory by Hillsdale.

=== Schedule ===
Date	Time	Opponent	Site	Result	Attendance	Source
		Albion	Hillsdale, MI	L 0–16		
October 8		Albion	Hillsdale, MI	L 6–38		
October 24		at Howe Hall College	Lima, IN	W 36–0		
November 7		at Olivet	Charlotte, MI	W 14–12		
November 24	2:45 p.m.	at Notre Dame	Brownson Hall field; Notre Dame, IN	T 8–8	1,200	
		Homer Village	Hillsdale, MI	W 22–0		

== 1893 ==
1893 Hillsdale Dales football
- Conference: Independent
- Record: 4–1
- Head coach: None

The 1893 Hillsdale Dales football team represented Hillsdale College as a member of the Michigan Intercollegiate Athletic Association (MIAA) during the 1893 college football season. The team compiled a 4–1 record with its only loss being against Notre Dame at South Bend, Indiana.

=== Schedule ===
Date	Time	Opponent	Site	Result	Source
October 16		at Albion	Albion, MI	W 18–0	
October 21		at Fort Wayne YMCA	Lakeside grounds; Fort Wayne, IN	W 34–4	
October 28		Michigan State Normal	Hillsdale, MI	W 28–0	
November 18	3:30 p.m.	Albion	Hillsdale, MI	W 18–0	
November 30		at Notre Dame	Brownson Hall field; Notre Dame, IN	L 10–22 or 12–22	

== 1894 ==
1894 Hillsdale Dales football
- Conference: Michigan Intercollegiate Athletic Association
- Record: 3–3 (1–2 MIAA)
- Head coach: James L. Morrison (1st season)

1894 Michigan Intercollegiate Athletic Association football standings
	Conf.					Overall
Team	W		L		T	W		L		T
Albion $	3	–	0	–	0	5	–	1	–	1
Hillsdale	1	–	2	–	0	3	–	3	–	0
Olivet	1	–	2	–	0	1	–	3	–	0
Michigan State Normal	0	–	1	–	0	5	–	2	–	0
$ – Conference champion

The 1894 Hillsdale Dales football team represented Hillsdale College as a member of the Michigan Intercollegiate Athletic Association (MIAA) during the 1894 college football season. In their first and only season under head coach James L. Morrison, Hillsdale compiled an overall record of 3–3.

=== Schedule ===
Date	Opponent	Site	Result	Attendance	Source
October 13	at Notre Dame*	Brownson Hall field; Notre Dame, IN	L 6–14		
October 22	Olivet	Hillsdale, MI	W 34–6		
October 29	at Albion	Fair grounds; Albion, MI	L 0–18		
	Albion		L 16–30		
November 24	at Kalamazoo*	Lake View Park; Kalamazoo, MI	W 66–0	200	
November 29	Adrian*	Hillsdale, MI	W 28–4		
*Non-conference game

== 1895 ==
1895 Hillsdale Dales football
- Conference: Independent
- Record: 1–0–1
- Head coach: None

1895 Midwestern college football independents records
	Conf.			Overall
Team	W	L	T	W		L		T
Miami (OH)		–		3	–	0	–	0
Carthage		–		2	–	0	–	0
Washington University		–		2	–	0	–	0
Michigan		–		8	–	1	–	0
Chicago		–		10	–	3	–	0
Wittenberg		–		5	–	2	–	0
Minnesota		–		7	–	3	–	0
Wisconsin		–		5	–	2	–	1
Wabash		–		6	–	3	–	0
Baldwin–Wallace		–		3	–	1	–	0
Notre Dame		–		3	–	1	–	0
Illinois		–		4	–	2	–	1
Buchtel		–		3	–	2	–	0
College of Emporia		–		3	–	2	–	0
Doane		–		3	–	2	–	0
Chicago P&S		–		3	–	2	–	1
Purdue		–		4	–	3	–	0
Indiana		–		4	–	3	–	1
Northwestern		–		6	–	5	–	0
Butler		–		2	–	2	–	0
Cincinnati		–		3	–	3	–	0
Kalamazoo		–		1	–	1	–	0
Michigan State Normal		–		3	–	3	–	0
North Dakota Agricultural		–		1	–	1	–	0
North Dakota		–		1	–	1	–	0
Ohio State		–		4	–	4	–	2
Iowa Agricultural		–		3	–	4	–	0
Ohio		–		2	–	3	–	0
Rush-Lake Forest		–		4	–	6	–	0
Ohio Wesleyan		–		2	–	4	–	1
Haskell		–		1	–	2	–	0
Iowa State Normal		–		1	–	2	–	0
Lake Forest		–		1	–	2	–	0
Northwestern Law		–		1	–	2	–	0
Drake		–		1	–	4	–	0

The 1895 Hillsdale Dales football team represented Hillsdale College as a member of the Michigan Intercollegiate Athletic Association (MIAA) during the 1895 college football season. In their fifth season fielding an intercollegiate football team, the Hillsdale eleven compiled a 1–0–1 record. The team did not form until November, when Robinson, the team's manager, arranged two games with Adrian, one of which was to take place on Thanksgiving.

=== Schedule ===
Date	Opponent	Site	Result	Source
	Adrian		T 12–12	
	Adrian		W 4–0	

== 1896 ==
1896 Hillsdale Dales football
- Conference: Independent
- Record: 2–4
- Head coach: Duncan M. Martin (1st season)
- Captain: Kitchen

1896 Midwestern college football independents records
	Conf.			Overall
Team	W	L	T	W		L		T
Carthage		–		4	–	0	–	0
St. Ignatius College Chicago		–		1	–	0	–	0
Washburn		–		6	–	1	–	1
Iowa Agricultural		–		8	–	2	–	0
Central Michigan		–		3	–	1	–	0
Miami (OH)		–		3	–	1	–	0
Ohio Wesleyan		–		6	–	2	–	0
Detroit College		–		5	–	2	–	0
North Dakota Agricultural		–		3	–	1	–	1
Heidelberg		–		2	–	1	–	0
Ohio		–		4	–	2	–	1
Indiana		–		5	–	3	–	0
Beloit		–		2	–	1	–	3
Butler		–		4	–	3	–	0
Iowa State Normal		–		4	–	3	–	0
Notre Dame		–		4	–	3	–	0
Cincinnati		–		4	–	3	–	1
Wittenberg		–		5	–	4	–	0
Baldwin–Wallace		–		2	–	2	–	0
College of Emporia		–		2	–	3	–	0
Ohio State		–		5	–	5	–	1
Lake Forest		–		3	–	4	–	1
Mount Union		–		3	–	4	–	1
Wabash		–		3	–	4	–	0
Drake		–		2	–	3	–	0
Chicago P&S		–		2	–	4	–	2
Hillsdale		–		2	–	4	–	0
Kansas State		–		0	–	1	–	1
Indiana State Normal		–		0	–	1	–	0
Buchtel		–		0	–	1	–	0
Washington University		–		0	–	2	–	0
Doane		–		0	–	5	–	0
Haskell		–		0	–	5	–	0

The 1896 Hillsdale Dales football team represented Hillsdale College as a member of the Michigan Intercollegiate Athletic Association (MIAA) during the 1896 college football season. In their first season under head coach Duncan M. Martin, the Hillsdale eleven compiled a record of 2–4. Kitchen was the team captain.

=== Schedule ===
Date	Time	Opponent	Site	Result	Source
September 27		at Michigan State Normal	Ypsilanti, MI	L 0–18	
October 12	3:30 p.m.	Purdue second team	Hillsdale, MI	L 0–8	
		Adrian		W 42–0 or 46–0	
October 24		at Albion	Albion, MI	L 0–20	
November 21		at Coldwater	Coldwater, MI	W 10–0	
November 26		at Howe Military Academy	Lima, IN	L 0–30	

== 1897 ==
1897 Hillsdale Dales football
- Conference: Michigan Intercollegiate Athletic Association
- Record: 1–1–1 (0–1–1 MIAA)
- Head coach: Ignatius M. Duffy (1st season)

The 1897 Hillsdale Dales football team represented Hillsdale College as a member of the Michigan Intercollegiate Athletic Association (MIAA) during the 1897 college football season. In their first and only season under head coach Ignatius M. Duffy, the Hillsdale eleven compiled a 1–1–1 record (0–0–1 in conference games).

=== Schedule ===
Date	Opponent	Site	Result	Source
October 23	Albion	Hillsdale, MI	T 0–0	
	Albion		L 2–5	
	Coldwater Athletic Club*		W 26–0	
*Non-conference game

== 1898 ==
1898 Hillsdale Dales football
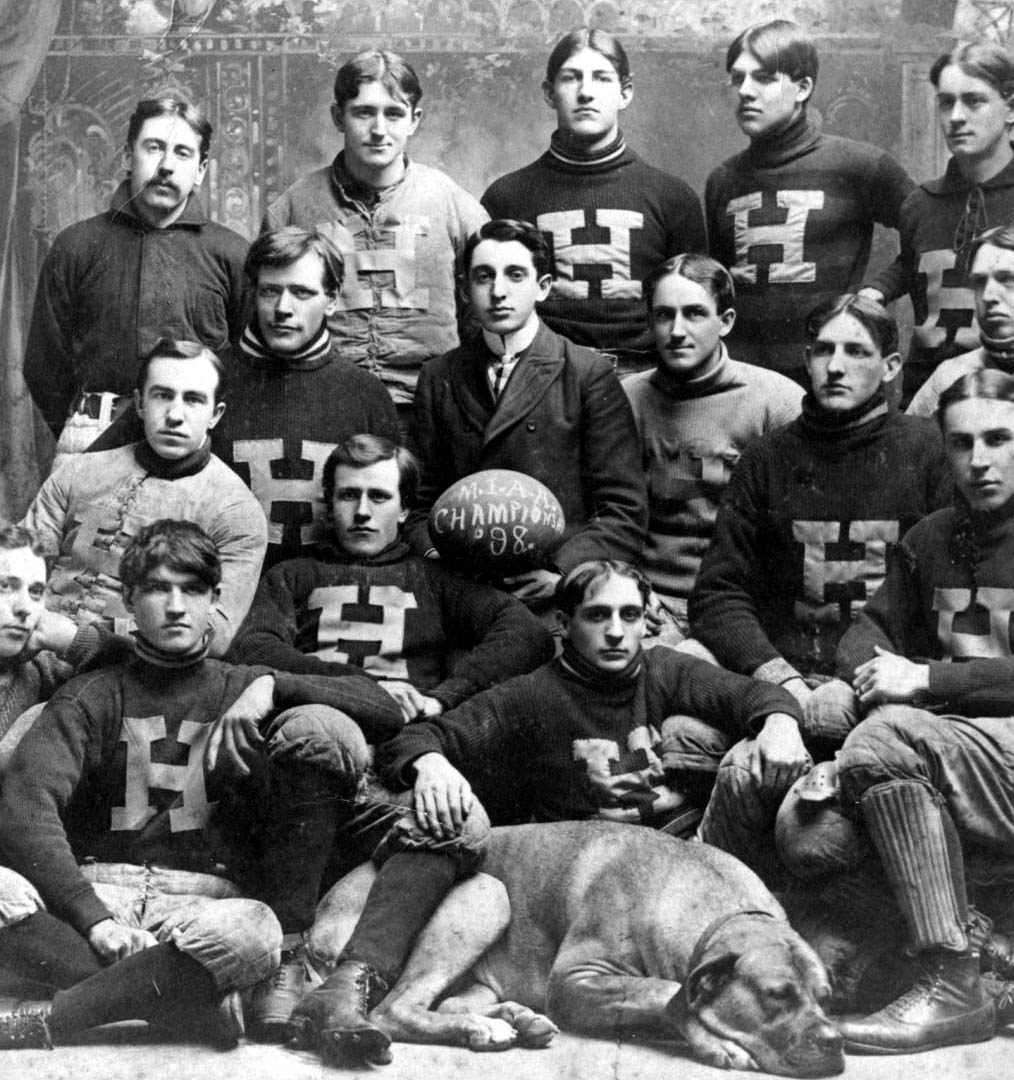
- Conference: Michigan Intercollegiate Athletic Association
- Record: 4–1 (2–0 MIAA)
- Head coach: Duncan M. Martin (2nd season)

1898 Michigan Intercollegiate Athletic Association football standings
	Conf.					Overall
Team	W		L		T	W		L		T
Kalamazoo $	5	–	0	–	0	7	–	0	–	0
Hillsdale	2	–	0	–	0	4	–	1	–	0
Michigan Agricultural	4	–	1	–	0	4	–	3	–	0
Michigan State Normal	0	–	3	–	0	1	–	5	–	2
Olivet	0	–	3	–	0	0	–	5	–	0
Albion	0	–	4	–	0	1	–	6	–	0
$ – Conference champion

The 1898 Hillsdale Dales football team represented Hillsdale College as a member of the Michigan Intercollegiate Athletic Association (MIAA) during the 1898 college football season. In their second, non-consecutive season under head coach Duncan M. Martin, the Hillsdale eleven compiled a 4–1 record (2–0 in conference games)'

=== Schedule ===
Date	Opponent	Site	Result	Source
	Albion		W 34–2	
	Adrian*		W 47–0	
November 24	Michigan State Normal	Hillsdale, MI	W 21–0	
	Charlotte City*		L 0–8	
	White Pigeon*		W 12–2	
*Non-conference game

== 1899 ==
1899 Hillsdale Dales football
- Conference: Michigan Intercollegiate Athletic Association
- Record: 4–4 (3–2 MIAA)
- Head coach: None
- Home stadium: Martin Field

The 1899 Hillsdale Dales football team represented Hillsdale College as a member of the Michigan Intercollegiate Athletic Association (MIAA) during the 1899 college football season. In their ninth season fielding an intercollegiate football team, the Hillsdale eleven compiled an overall record of 4–4 with a mark of 3–2 in conference play.

=== Schedule ===
Date	Opponent	Site	Result	Source
September 30	at Michigan*	Regents Field; Ann Arbor, MI	L 0–11	
October 9	Coldwater High School*	Martin Field; Hillsdale, MI	W 35–0	
October 18	Kalamazoo		L 0–21	
October 23	at Albion	Albion, MI	W 6–5	
November 4	at Michigan Agricultural	East Lansing, MI	Cancelled	
November 13	Adrian	Martin Field; Hillsdale, MI	W 11–0	
November 18	at Olivet	Olivet, MI	L 0–6	
November 24	Albion	Martin Field; Hillsdale, MI	W 11–5	
November 30	at Howe School*	Lima, IN	L 0–12	
*Non-conference game
