= Doug Nott =

American football player (1911–1991)

Profile
- Position: Halfback

Personal information
- Born: June 14, 1911; Pontiac, Michigan, U.S.
- Died: May 25, 1991 (aged 79); Walled Lake, Michigan, U.S.
- Listed height: 5 ft 11 in (1.80 m)
- Listed weight: 195 lb (88 kg)

Career information
- High school: Ann Arbor (MI)
- College: Detroit

Career history
- Boston Redskins (1935); Detroit Lions (1935)

Awards and highlights
- NFL champion (1935); Second-team All-American (1933)
- Stats at Pro Football Reference

Douglas N. Nott (June 14, 1911 – May 25, 1991) was an American football player. He played college football for the University of Detroit from 1932 to 1934 and professional football for the Detroit Lions and Boston Redskins in 1935. He led the 1933 Detroit Titans football team to a 7–1 record and also led country with 1,092 passing yards in 1933.

== Early year ==
Nott was born in Pontiac, Michigan, in 1911. He attended Ann Arbor High School where he played football as a blocking back. In addition to football, Nott also won varsity letters in basketball, baseball and swimming at Ann Arbor High.

== Football career ==
Nott enrolled at the University of Detroit in 1931 and played as a halfback for head coach Gus Dorais' Detroit Titans football teams from 1932 to 1934. In 1933, he completed 51 of 115 passes for 1,092 yards, an average of 136-1/2 yards per game. His 1,092 passing yards led the NCAA major college players, and according to at least one account, established a new national record.

In January 1935, the University of Detroit announced that Nott had been barred from classes because he had missed too many classes and would not be permitted to graduate with his classmates in June 1935.

In February 1935, Nott signed a contract to play professional football for the Detroit Lions. He appeared in five games for the Lions during the 1935 NFL season, rushing for 98 yards on 49 carries and completing 9 of 34 passes for 169 yards. In early November 1935, the Lions traded Nott to the Boston Redskins in exchange for another rookie, Bill Shepherd. He appeared in four games for the Redskins, rushing for three yards and passing for 35 yards.

== Later life ==
Nott later worked in the labor relations department of the Ford Motor Company. He was inducted into the University of Detroit Titans Hall of Fame in 1980. He died in 1991 at his home in Walled Lake, Michigan, at age 79.

== See also ==
- List of NCAA major college football yearly passing leaders
