= Ira Pratt =

American football coach and music professor

Biographical details
- Born: c. 1883; Iowa, U.S.

Coaching career (HC unless noted)
- 1896: Kansas State

Head coaching record
- Overall: 0–1–1

Ira Pratt (c. 1883 – ?) was an American college football coach and music professor. He served as the first head football coach for at Kansas State Agricultural College, now Kansas State University. He held the position for one season in 1896, compiling a record of 0–1–1. Pratt was also a professor of music at Kansas State, and later served as head of the department of music at the school and then dean of the school of music at Washburn University.

== Head coaching record ==
Year	Team	Overall	Conference	Standing	Bowl/playoffs
Kansas State Aggies (Independent) (1896)
1896	Kansas State	0–1–1			
Kansas State:		0–1–1			
Total:		0–1–1			
