= Fred Rogers (American football) =

Former American football coach

Coaching career (HC unless noted)
- 1896: Drake

Head coaching record
- Overall: 2–3

Fred Rogers was an American football coach. He was the third head football coach at Drake University in Des Moines, Iowa, serving for the 1896 season and compiling a record of 2–3.

== Head coaching record ==
Year	Team	Overall	Conference	Standing	Bowl/playoffs
Drake Bulldogs (Independent) (1896)
1896	Drake	2–3			
Drake:		2–3			
Total:		2–3			
