= 1909 Notre Dame Fighting Irish football team =

American college football season

1909 Notre Dame Fighting Irish football
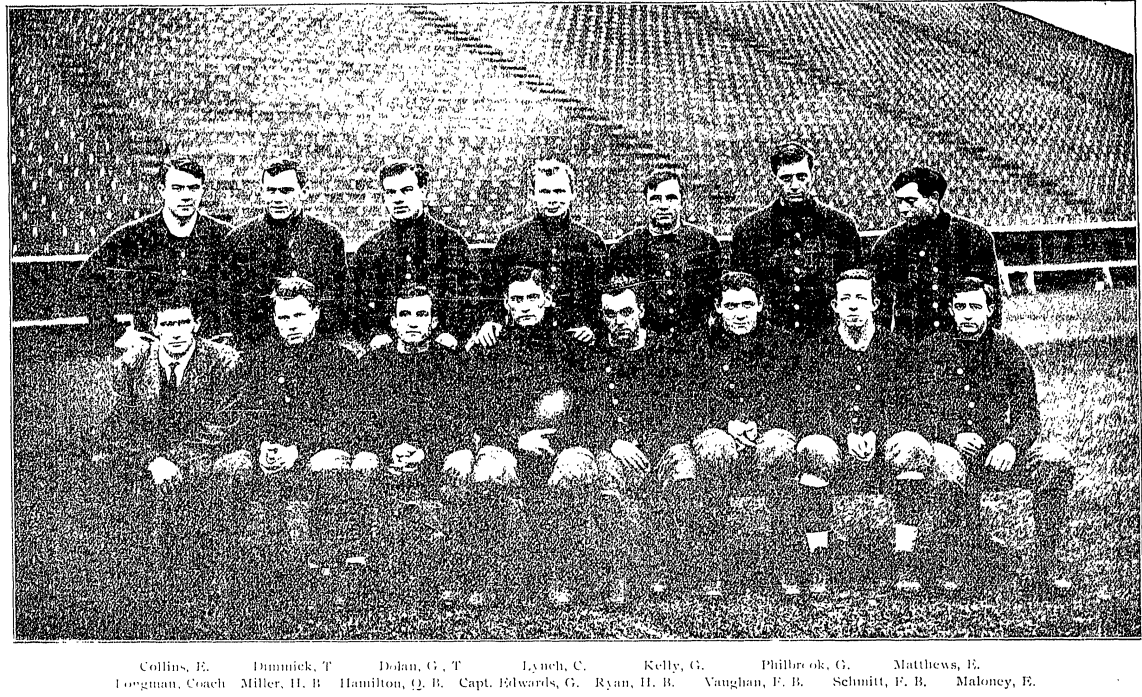
- Conference: Independent
- Record: 7–0–1
- Head coach: Frank Longman (1st season)
- Captain: Howard Edwards
- Home stadium: Cartier Field

1909 Midwestern college football independents records
	Conf.			Overall
Team	W	L	T	W		L		T
Iowa State Normal		–		6	–	0	–	0
Notre Dame		–		7	–	0	–	1
Michigan Agricultural		–		8	–	1	–	0
Carthage		–		6	–	1	–	0
Michigan		–		6	–	1	–	0
Western State Normal		–		6	–	1	–	0
Mount Union		–		8	–	2	–	0
Lake Forest		–		5	–	1	–	1
Haskell		–		7	–	2	–	0
Detroit College		–		3	–	1	–	2
Butler		–		5	–	3	–	0
Central Michigan		–		4	–	3	–	0
St. Mary's (OH)		–		4	–	3	–	0
Cincinnati		–		4	–	3	–	1
Doane		–		3	–	2	–	3
Buchtel		–		4	–	4	–	0
Rose Poly		–		4	–	4	–	0
Marquette		–		2	–	2	–	1
North Dakota Agricultural		–		2	–	2	–	1
Wabash		–		3	–	4	–	1
Miami (OH)		–		3	–	4	–	0
Ohio		–		2	–	4	–	2
Saint Louis		–		3	–	5	–	0
Michigan State Normal		–		2	–	4	–	0
Western Illinois		–		1	–	2	–	0
Fairmount		–		2	–	5	–	1
Northern Illinois State		–		2	–	6	–	0
South Dakota State		–		1	–	3	–	0
Heidelberg		–		0	–	7	–	2

The 1909 Notre Dame Fighting Irish football team was an American football team that represented the University of Notre Dame as an independent during the 1909 college football season. In their first year under head coach Frank Longman, the team compiled a 7–0–1 record, shut out six of eight opponents, and outscored all opponents by a total of 236 to 14. They defeated Michigan Agricultural (now known as Michigan State), Michigan, and Pittsburgh, and played Marquette to a scoreless tie. In the Michigan game, former Michigan fullback Longman coached the Irish to a victory over his former head coach Fielding H. Yost.

The team played its home games at Cartier Field in Notre Dame, Indiana

== Schedule ==
Date	Time	Opponent	Site	Result	Attendance	Source
October 9		Olivet	Cartier Field; Notre Dame, IN	W 58–0		
October 16		Rose Polytechnic	Cartier Field; Notre Dame, IN	W 60–11		
October 23		Michigan Agricultural	Cartier Field; Notre Dame, IN (rivalry)	W 17–0		
October 30		at Pittsburgh	Forbes Field; Pittsburgh, PA (rivalry)	W 6–0	6,000	
November 6	2:15 p.m.	at Michigan	Ferry Field; Ann Arbor, MI (rivalry)	W 11–3		
November 13		Miami (OH)	Cartier Field; Notre Dame, IN	W 46–0		
November 20		Wabash	Cartier Field; Notre Dame, IN	W 38–0		
November 25		at Marquette	Milwaukee, WI	T 0–0		

== Personnel ==
=== Players ===
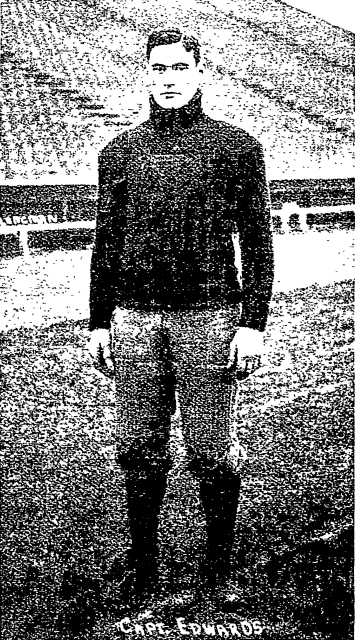
Howard Edwards

- Joe Colins, end
- Ralph Dimmick
- Sam Dolan, guard
- Pete Dwyer, halfback
- Howard Edwards, captain and guard
- Don Hamilton, quarterback
- Albert "Red" Kelley
- Edward "Copper" Lynch, center
- James Maloney
- Lee Matthews
- Harry Miller, halfback
- George Philbrook
- Billy Ryan, halfback
- William Schmitt, fullback/utility man
- Robert E. Vaughan, fullback

=== Coaching staff ===
- Head coach: Frank Longman
- Assistant coach and manager: Curtis
