= 1896 Ohio State Buckeyes football team =

American college football season

1896 Ohio State Buckeyes football
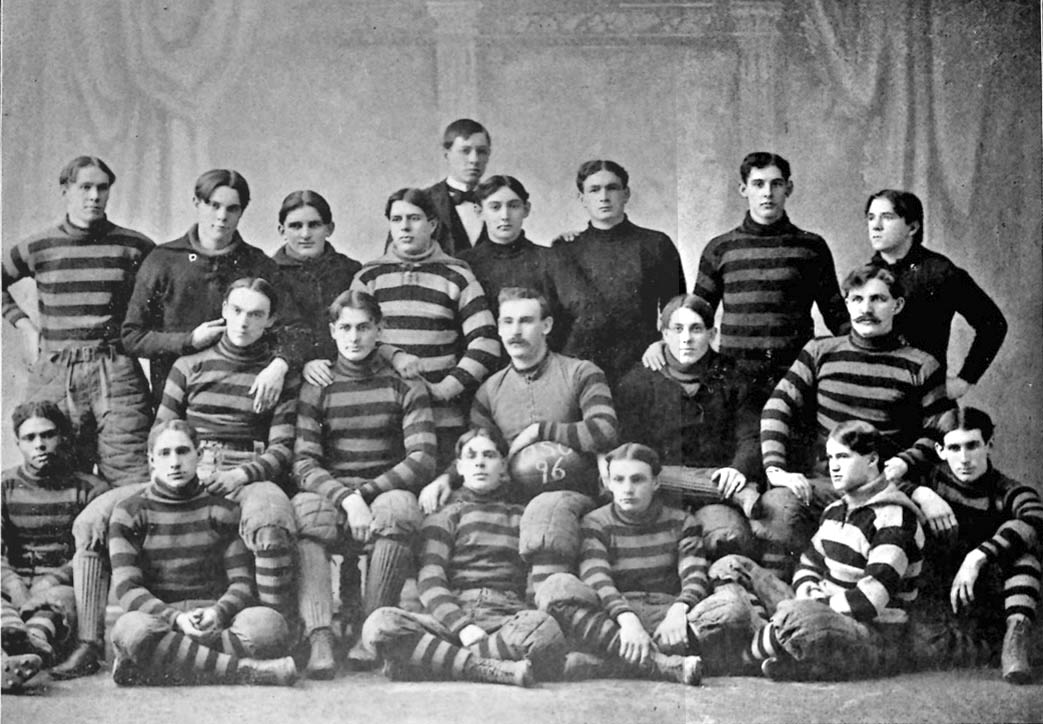
- Conference: Independent
- Record: 5–5–1
- Head coach: Charles A. Hickey (1st season)
- Home stadium: Recreation Park

1896 Midwestern college football independents records
	Conf.			Overall
Team	W	L	T	W		L		T
Carthage		–		4	–	0	–	0
St. Ignatius College Chicago		–		1	–	0	–	0
Washburn		–		6	–	1	–	1
Iowa Agricultural		–		8	–	2	–	0
Central Michigan		–		3	–	1	–	0
Miami (OH)		–		3	–	1	–	0
Ohio Wesleyan		–		6	–	2	–	0
Detroit College		–		5	–	2	–	0
North Dakota Agricultural		–		3	–	1	–	1
Heidelberg		–		2	–	1	–	0
Ohio		–		4	–	2	–	1
Indiana		–		5	–	3	–	0
Beloit		–		2	–	1	–	3
Missouri		–		7	–	5	–	0
Butler		–		4	–	3	–	0
Iowa State Normal		–		4	–	3	–	0
Notre Dame		–		4	–	3	–	0
Cincinnati		–		4	–	3	–	1
Wittenberg		–		5	–	4	–	0
Baldwin–Wallace		–		2	–	2	–	0
College of Emporia		–		2	–	3	–	0
Ohio State		–		5	–	5	–	1
Lake Forest		–		3	–	4	–	1
Mount Union		–		3	–	4	–	1
Wabash		–		3	–	4	–	0
Drake		–		2	–	3	–	0
Chicago P&S		–		2	–	4	–	2
Hillsdale		–		2	–	4	–	0
Kansas State		–		0	–	1	–	1
Indiana State Normal		–		0	–	1	–	0
Buchtel		–		0	–	1	–	0
Washington University		–		0	–	2	–	0
Doane		–		0	–	5	–	0
Haskell		–		0	–	5	–	0

The 1896 Ohio State Buckeyes football team represented Ohio State University as an independent during the 1896 college football season. Led by Charles A. Hickey in his first and only year as head coach, Ohio State compiled a record of 5–5–1.

== Schedule ==
Date	Opponent	Site	Result	Attendance	Source
October 3	Ohio Medical	Recreation Park; Columbus, OH	W 24–0		
October 10	at Cincinnati	League Park; Cincinnati, OH	L 6–8	2,000	
October 17	vs. Otterbein	Canton, OH	W 12–0	800	
October 23	at Oberlin	Oberlin, OH	L 0–16		
October 30	Case	Recreation Park; Columbus, OH	W 30–10		
November 5	Ohio Wesleyan	Recreation Park; Columbus, OH	L 4–10		
November 7	Columbus Barracks	Recreation Park; Columbus, OH	W 10–2		
November 11	Ohio Medical	Recreation Park; Columbus, OH	T 0–0		
November 14	Wittenberg	Recreation Park; Columbus, OH	L 6–24		
November 21	Ohio Medical	Recreation Park; Columbus, OH	W 12–0		
November 26	Kenyon	Recreation Park; Columbus, OH	L 18–34		
