= 1896 Notre Dame football team =

American college football season

1896 Notre Dame football
- Conference: Independent
- Record: 4–3
- Head coach: Frank E. Hering (1st season)
- Captain: Frank E. Hering
- Home stadium: Brownson Hall field

1896 Midwestern college football independents records
	Conf.			Overall
Team	W	L	T	W		L		T
Carthage		–		4	–	0	–	0
St. Ignatius College Chicago		–		1	–	0	–	0
Washburn		–		6	–	1	–	1
Iowa Agricultural		–		8	–	2	–	0
Central Michigan		–		3	–	1	–	0
Miami (OH)		–		3	–	1	–	0
Ohio Wesleyan		–		6	–	2	–	0
Detroit College		–		5	–	2	–	0
North Dakota Agricultural		–		3	–	1	–	1
Heidelberg		–		2	–	1	–	0
Ohio		–		4	–	2	–	1
Indiana		–		5	–	3	–	0
Beloit		–		2	–	1	–	3
Missouri		–		7	–	5	–	0
Butler		–		4	–	3	–	0
Iowa State Normal		–		4	–	3	–	0
Notre Dame		–		4	–	3	–	0
Cincinnati		–		4	–	3	–	1
Wittenberg		–		5	–	4	–	0
Baldwin–Wallace		–		2	–	2	–	0
College of Emporia		–		2	–	3	–	0
Ohio State		–		5	–	5	–	1
Lake Forest		–		3	–	4	–	1
Mount Union		–		3	–	4	–	1
Wabash		–		3	–	4	–	0
Drake		–		2	–	3	–	0
Chicago P&S		–		2	–	4	–	2
Hillsdale		–		2	–	4	–	0
Kansas State		–		0	–	1	–	1
Indiana State Normal		–		0	–	1	–	0
Buchtel		–		0	–	1	–	0
Washington University		–		0	–	2	–	0
Doane		–		0	–	5	–	0
Haskell		–		0	–	5	–	0

The 1896 Notre Dame football team was an American football team that represented the University of Notre Dame in the 1896 college football season. Frank E. Hering was the team's captain and coach. The team compiled a 4–3 record, shut out four opponents, and outscored its opponents by a combined total of 160 to 50.

== Schedule ==
Date	Opponent	Site	Result	Source
October 8	Chicago Physicians and Surgeons	Brownson Hall field; Notre Dame, IN	L 0–4	
October 14	Chicago	Brownson Hall field; Notre Dame, IN	L 0–18	
October 27	South Bend Commercial-Athletic Club	Brownson Hall field; Notre Dame, IN	W 46–0	
October 31	Albion	Brownson Hall field; Notre Dame, IN	W 24–0	
November 14	Purdue	Brownson Hall field; Notre Dame, IN (rivalry)	L 22–28	
November 20	Highland Views	Brownson Hall field; Notre Dame, IN	W 82–0	
November 26	Beloit	Brownson Hall field; Notre Dame, IN	W 8–0	
