= 1896 Highland Views football team =

American college football season

1896 Highland Views football
- Conference: Independent
- Record: 1–1

The 1896 Highland Views football team was an American football team that represented the Highland Views club of South Bend, Indiana in the 1896 college football season. The Green and White (the club's colors) had held claim to being the Northern Indiana and Southern Michigan football champions, as they had not lost or been scored against in the past three years. This claim was dashed when the club team lost to Notre Dame, 82 to 0.

== Schedule ==
Date	Opponent	Site	Result	Source
October 25	Chicago First Regiment	South Bend, IN	W 34–0	
November 20	Notre Dame	Brownson Hall field; Notre Dame, IN	L 0–82	
