= Detroit College Tigers football, 1896–1909 =

American college football seasons

The Detroit College Tigers football teams (later known as the Detroit Titans) represented Detroit College (renamed the University of Detroit in 1911) in American football. The team played its home games at various locations in Detroit, including the grounds of the Detroit Athletic Club.

Highlights of the school's first 13 years of intercollegiate football include the following:

- The team played its first game on October 15, 1896, defeating the Detroit School for Boys by a 20–0 score.
- The team played its first intercollegiate game on November 26, 1896 against St. Ignatius College Chicago, losing by a 20–0 score. Detroit did not play another intercollegiate game until November 29, 1900. In a rematch with St. Ignatius, the Detroit team won by an 11–0 score.
- The 1899 team compiled a 5–1–1 and outscored opponents by a total of 101 to 15. The first four games were played against local high schools, and the last game was played against the college's alumni.
- In 1901, the team played its first game against Michigan Agricultural College (now Michigan State University).
- On October 10, 1903, the team played its first game against the Michigan State Normal School (now Eastern Michigan University) from Ypsilanti. The Detroiters won by a 6–0 score.
- In November 1905, after only one game had been played, the college president, Rev. Kellinger, declared that football was "too rough" and too expensive. The team was then disbanded. In October 1906, the college faculty voted to allow students to resume competition in intercollegiate football.
- In 1909, the school played its first season exclusively against other college teams. Prior to 1909, the school's opponents had consisted largely of local high schools, clubs, alumni, and other institutions.

== 1896 ==
1896 Detroit College Tigers football
- Conference: Independent
- Record: 5–2
- Head coach: William S. Robinson (1st season)

1896 Midwestern college football independents records
| | Conf. | | | Overall |
| Team | W | L | T | W | | L | | T |
|---|---|---|---|---|---|---|---|---|
| Carthage | | – | | 4 | – | 0 | – | 0 |
| St. Ignatius College Chicago | | – | | 1 | – | 0 | – | 0 |
| Washburn | | – | | 6 | – | 1 | – | 1 |
| Iowa Agricultural | | – | | 8 | – | 2 | – | 0 |
| Central Michigan | | – | | 3 | – | 1 | – | 0 |
| Miami (OH) | | – | | 3 | – | 1 | – | 0 |
| Ohio Wesleyan | | – | | 6 | – | 2 | – | 0 |
| Detroit College | | – | | 5 | – | 2 | – | 0 |
| North Dakota Agricultural | | – | | 3 | – | 1 | – | 1 |
| Heidelberg | | – | | 2 | – | 1 | – | 0 |
| Ohio | | – | | 4 | – | 2 | – | 1 |
| Indiana | | – | | 5 | – | 3 | – | 0 |
| Beloit | | – | | 2 | – | 1 | – | 3 |
| Butler | | – | | 4 | – | 3 | – | 0 |
| Iowa State Normal | | – | | 4 | – | 3 | – | 0 |
| Notre Dame | | – | | 4 | – | 3 | – | 0 |
| Cincinnati | | – | | 4 | – | 3 | – | 1 |
| Wittenberg | | – | | 5 | – | 4 | – | 0 |
| Baldwin–Wallace | | – | | 2 | – | 2 | – | 0 |
| College of Emporia | | – | | 2 | – | 3 | – | 0 |
| Ohio State | | – | | 5 | – | 5 | – | 1 |
| Lake Forest | | – | | 3 | – | 4 | – | 1 |
| Mount Union | | – | | 3 | – | 4 | – | 1 |
| Wabash | | – | | 3 | – | 4 | – | 0 |
| Drake | | – | | 2 | – | 3 | – | 0 |
| Chicago P&S | | – | | 2 | – | 4 | – | 2 |
| Hillsdale | | – | | 2 | – | 4 | – | 0 |
| Kansas State | | – | | 0 | – | 1 | – | 1 |
| Indiana State Normal | | – | | 0 | – | 1 | – | 0 |
| Buchtel | | – | | 0 | – | 1 | – | 0 |
| Washington University | | – | | 0 | – | 2 | – | 0 |
| Doane | | – | | 0 | – | 5 | – | 0 |
| Haskell | | – | | 0 | – | 5 | – | 0 |

The 1896 Detroit College Tigers football team represented Detroit College (renamed the University of Detroit in 1911) during the 1896 college football season. Detroit outscored opponents by a combined total of 66 to 40 and finished with a 5–2 record in their first year of intercollegiate football. The team's head coach was William S. Robinson.

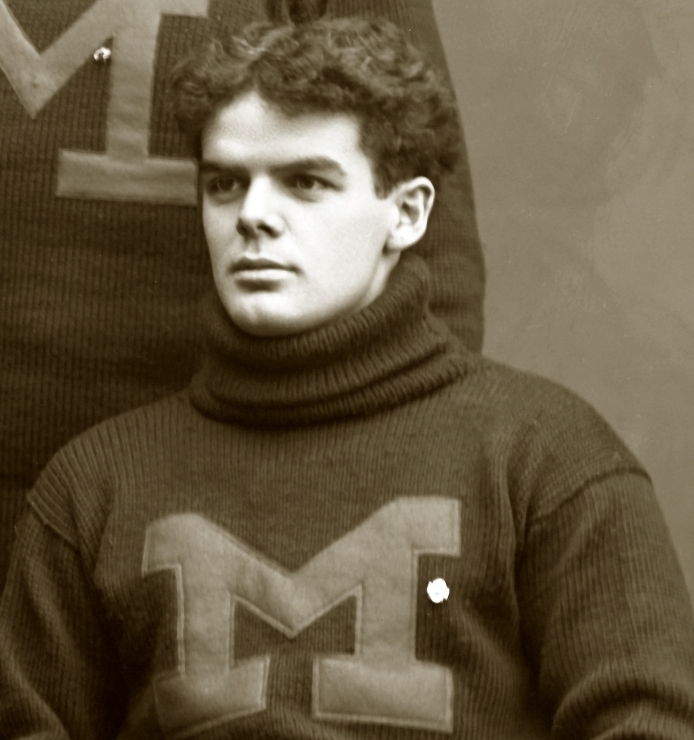
Fullback Leo J. Keena

In the only intercollegiate football game of the season, Detroit was shut out by St. Ignatius College by a 20 to 0 score on Thanksgiving Day.

Leo J. Keena played at the fullback position for the 1896 Detroit team, and later played for Michigan from 1897 to 1899. Ernest O'Brien was the captain of the 1896 team.

=== Schedule ===
| Date | Opponent | Site | Result | Attendance | Source |
|---|---|---|---|---|---|
| October 15 | Detroit School for Boys | Detroit Athletic Club grounds; Detroit, MI | W 20–0 | | |
| October 22 | Hubbard Cadets | Michigan Athletic Association grounds; Detroit, MI | W 24–0 | | |
| October 29 | Kappa Gamma Psi of Detroit High School | Michigan Athletic Association grounds; Detroit, MI | L 0–16 | | |
| | Detroit alumni | | W 30–0 | | |
| November 12 | Union Athletic Club | Michigan Athletic Association grounds; Detroit, MI | W 32–0 | | |
| November 19 | Hubbard Cadets | Detroit, MI | W | | |
| November 26 | St. Ignatius College Chicago | Michigan Athletic Association grounds; Detroit, MI | L 0–20 | 800 | |

=== Players ===
The team included the following players:

- Francis T. Atkinson, quarterback
- Ernest A. O'Brien, halfback
- W. Alfred Debo, halfback
- Leo J. Keena, fullback
- William Van Dyke, center
- James I. Atkinson, guard
- Maurice W. Chawke, guard
- C. O'Reilly "Riley" Riley Atkinson, tackle
- Robert E. Lee, tackle
- John J. Walsh, tackle
- Alfred B. Moran, end
- Dohaney, end
- Frederick V. Burnham, end
- Otto F. Lang, end

== 1897 ==
1897 Detroit College Tigers football
- Conference: Independent
- Record: 1–2
- Head coach: William S. Robinson (2nd season)

1897 Midwestern college football independents records
| | Conf. | | | Overall |
| Team | W | L | T | W | | L | | T |
|---|---|---|---|---|---|---|---|---|
| Butler | | – | | 3 | – | 0 | – | 0 |
| Fairmount | | – | | 1 | – | 0 | – | 0 |
| Washburn | | – | | 7 | – | 1 | – | 0 |
| Cincinnati | | – | | 9 | – | 1 | – | 1 |
| Iowa State Normal | | – | | 5 | – | 1 | – | 0 |
| Ohio Wesleyan | | – | | 7 | – | 1 | – | 1 |
| Indiana | | – | | 6 | – | 1 | – | 1 |
| Ohio | | – | | 7 | – | 2 | – | 0 |
| Carthage | | – | | 3 | – | 1 | – | 0 |
| Iowa Agricultural | | – | | 3 | – | 1 | – | 0 |
| Notre Dame | | – | | 4 | – | 1 | – | 1 |
| Central Michigan | | – | | 2 | – | 1 | – | 0 |
| Baldwin–Wallace | | – | | 2 | – | 1 | – | 1 |
| Chicago Dental Infirmary | | – | | 2 | – | 2 | – | 1 |
| Lake Forest | | – | | 4 | – | 5 | – | 1 |
| Drake | | – | | 2 | – | 3 | – | 0 |
| Heidelberg | | – | | 2 | – | 3 | – | 0 |
| Detroit College | | – | | 1 | – | 2 | – | 0 |
| Indiana Normal | | – | | 1 | – | 4 | – | 0 |
| Kansas State | | – | | 1 | – | 2 | – | 1 |
| Mount Union | | – | | 2 | – | 4 | – | 1 |
| Rush Medical College | | – | | 1 | – | 4 | – | 1 |
| DePauw | | – | | 2 | – | 6 | – | 0 |
| Wittenberg | | – | | 2 | – | 6 | – | 0 |
| Haskell | | – | | 1 | – | 4 | – | 0 |
| Indiana State Normal | | – | | 1 | – | 4 | – | 0 |
| Ohio State | | – | | 1 | – | 7 | – | 1 |
| Lincoln (MO) | | – | | 0 | – | 1 | – | 0 |
| South Dakota Agricultural | | – | | 0 | – | 1 | – | 0 |
| Washington University | | – | | 0 | – | 2 | – | 0 |
| North Dakota Agricultural | | – | | 0 | – | 3 | – | 0 |

The 1897 Detroit College Tigers football team was an American football team that represented Detroit College (renamed the University of Detroit in 1911) as an independent during the 1897 college football season. In its second season under head coach William S. Robinson, the team compiled a 1–2 record and was outscored by opponents by a combined total of 36 to 28. The team played one game against the Michigan Military Academy (a 26–24 loss) and two games against Detroit High School (one win and one loss). The result of the loss was disputed because the high school game had two players who were not students.

=== Schedule ===
| Date | Opponent | Site | Result | Source |
|---|---|---|---|---|
| October 16 | YMCA | Michigan Athletic Association grounds; Detroit, MI | ? | |
| October 28 | at Michigan Military Academy | Orchard Lake, MI | L 24–26 | |
| November 4 | Detroit High School | Detroit Athletic Club; Detroit, MI | L 0–10 | |
| November 18 | Detroit High School | YMCA grounds; Detroit, MI | W 4–0 | |

== 1898 ==
1898 Detroit College Tigers football
- Conference: Independent
- Record: 5–0
- Head coach: William S. Robinson (3rd season)

1898 Midwestern college football independents records
| | Conf. | | | Overall |
| Team | W | L | T | W | | L | | T |
|---|---|---|---|---|---|---|---|---|
| Washington University | | – | | 6 | – | 0 | – | 0 |
| Detroit College | | – | | 5 | – | 0 | – | 0 |
| Carthage | | – | | 3 | – | 0 | – | 0 |
| Lincoln (MO) | | – | | 1 | – | 0 | – | 0 |
| Iowa State Normal | | – | | 4 | – | 0 | – | 1 |
| Washburn | | – | | 4 | – | 0 | – | 1 |
| Kansas | | – | | 7 | – | 1 | – | 0 |
| Cincinnati | | – | | 6 | – | 1 | – | 2 |
| Indiana | | – | | 4 | – | 1 | – | 2 |
| Nebraska | | – | | 8 | – | 3 | – | 0 |
| Drake | | – | | 4 | – | 2 | – | 0 |
| Lake Forest | | – | | 2 | – | 1 | – | 0 |
| Notre Dame | | – | | 4 | – | 2 | – | 0 |
| Western Reserve | | – | | 5 | – | 3 | – | 0 |
| Butler | | – | | 2 | – | 1 | – | 1 |
| Heidelberg | | – | | 4 | – | 3 | – | 0 |
| Michigan Agricultural | | – | | 4 | – | 3 | – | 0 |
| Iowa State | | – | | 3 | – | 2 | – | 0 |
| Kansas State | | – | | 1 | – | 1 | – | 2 |
| Miami (OH) | | – | | 1 | – | 1 | – | 0 |
| South Dakota Agricultural | | – | | 1 | – | 1 | – | 1 |
| DePauw | | – | | 3 | – | 4 | – | 2 |
| Iowa | | – | | 3 | – | 4 | – | 2 |
| Ohio State | | – | | 3 | – | 5 | – | 0 |
| Baldwin–Wallace | | – | | 2 | – | 4 | – | 0 |
| Central Michigan | | – | | 1 | – | 2 | – | 0 |
| Indiana State Normal | | – | | 1 | – | 2 | – | 0 |
| North Dakota Agricultural | | – | | 1 | – | 2 | – | 0 |
| Wabash | | – | | 2 | – | 5 | – | 1 |
| Ohio Wesleyan | | – | | 2 | – | 5 | – | 0 |
| Ohio | | – | | 1 | – | 3 | – | 0 |
| Haskell | | – | | 2 | – | 7 | – | 0 |
| Missouri | | – | | 1 | – | 4 | – | 1 |
| Wittenberg | | – | | 1 | – | 5 | – | 1 |
| Fairmount | | – | | 0 | – | 1 | – | 0 |
| College of Emporia | | – | | 0 | – | 2 | – | 0 |

The 1898 Detroit College Tigers football team was an American football team that represented Detroit College (renamed the University of Detroit in 1911) as an independent during the 1898 college football season. In its third season under head coach William S. Robinson, the team compiled a 5–0 record and outscored its opponents by a combined total of 91 to 12. The team played games against Detroit School for Boys, Irvings, Detroit Alumni, Michigan Military Academy and Mount Clemens High School.

=== Schedule ===
| Date | Opponent | Site | Result | Source |
|---|---|---|---|---|
| | Detroit School for Boys | Detroit, MI | W 31–0 | |
| | Irvings | | W 5–0 | |
| | Detroit alumni | Detroit, MI | W 22–0 | |
| November 17 | at Michigan Military Academy | Orchard Lake, MI | W 21–6 | |
| November 24 | at Mount Clemens High School | Mount Clemens, MI | W 12–6 | |

== 1899 ==
1899 Detroit College Tigers football
- Conference: Independent
- Record: 5–1–1
- Head coach: William S. Robinson (4th season)

1899 Midwestern college football independents records
| | Conf. | | | Overall |
| Team | W | L | T | W | | L | | T |
|---|---|---|---|---|---|---|---|---|
| Kansas | | – | | 10 | – | 0 | – | 0 |
| North Dakota | | – | | 6 | – | 0 | – | 0 |
| Detroit College | | – | | 5 | – | 0 | – | 0 |
| Lincoln (MO) | | – | | 1 | – | 0 | – | 0 |
| Ohio State | | – | | 9 | – | 0 | – | 1 |
| Iowa | | – | | 8 | – | 0 | – | 1 |
| Washington University | | – | | 5 | – | 1 | – | 0 |
| Missouri | | – | | 9 | – | 2 | – | 0 |
| Chicago P&S | | – | | 4 | – | 1 | – | 0 |
| Mount Union | | – | | 5 | – | 1 | – | 1 |
| Indiana | | – | | 6 | – | 2 | – | 0 |
| South Dakota Agricultural | | – | | 3 | – | 1 | – | 0 |
| Wabash | | – | | 1 | – | 0 | – | 1 |
| Cincinnati | | – | | 5 | – | 2 | – | 0 |
| Drake | | – | | 5 | – | 2 | – | 0 |
| Heidelberg | | – | | 5 | – | 2 | – | 0 |
| Buchtel | | – | | 2 | – | 1 | – | 0 |
| Doane | | – | | 2 | – | 1 | – | 0 |
| Northern Illinois State | | – | | 1 | – | 0 | – | 2 |
| Notre Dame | | – | | 6 | – | 3 | – | 1 |
| Central Michigan | | – | | 3 | – | 2 | – | 0 |
| Fairmount | | – | | 2 | – | 1 | – | 2 |
| Carthage | | – | | 3 | – | 2 | – | 1 |
| Western Reserve | | – | | 5 | – | 4 | – | 0 |
| Wittenberg | | – | | 5 | – | 4 | – | 0 |
| Iowa State | | – | | 5 | – | 4 | – | 1 |
| College of Emporia | | – | | 1 | – | 1 | – | 1 |
| Ohio | | – | | 2 | – | 2 | – | 0 |
| Rush Medical | | – | | 3 | – | 3 | – | 1 |
| Ohio Wesleyan | | – | | 5 | – | 5 | – | 0 |
| Haskell | | – | | 4 | – | 5 | – | 0 |
| Lake Forest | | – | | 4 | – | 6 | – | 2 |
| Kansas State | | – | | 2 | – | 3 | – | 0 |
| Iowa State Normal | | – | | 1 | – | 3 | – | 2 |
| Washburn | | – | | 2 | – | 5 | – | 2 |
| Butler | | – | | 1 | – | 3 | – | 0 |
| Miami (OH) | | – | | 1 | – | 5 | – | 0 |
| Nebraska | | – | | 1 | – | 7 | – | 1 |
| North Dakota Agricultural | | – | | 0 | – | 1 | – | 0 |
| Baldwin–Wallace | | – | | 0 | – | 4 | – | 0 |

The 1899 Detroit College Tigers football team was an American football team that represented Detroit College (renamed the University of Detroit in 1911) as an independent during the 1899 college football season. In its fourth season under head coach William S. Robinson, the team compiled a 5–1–1 record and outscored its opponents by a combined total of 101 to 15. The team's sole loss came against the Detroit Athletic Club reserves. Its victories were against Detroit School for Boys, Detroit Central High School, Detroit Monroe High School, Gutchess Business College and the Detroit Alumni.

=== Schedule ===
| Date | Opponent | Site | Result | Source |
|---|---|---|---|---|
| | Central High School | Detroit, MI | T 5–5 | |
| October 5 | Detroit School for Boys | Detroit Athletic Club grounds; Detroit, MI | W 12–0 | |
| | Central High School | Detroit, MI | W 11–0 | |
| November 2 | Monroe High School | Monroe, MI | W 17–0 | |
| November 9 | Detroit Athletic Club reserves | Detroit Athletic Club grounds; Detroit | L 0–10 | |
| | Gutchess Business College | | W 50–0 | |
| November 30 | Detroit alumni | Bennett Park; Detroit, MI | W 6–0 | |

== 1900 ==
1900 Detroit College Tigers football
- Conference: Independent
- Record: 3–2
- Head coach: John C. Mackey (1st season)

1900 Midwestern college football independents records
| | Conf. | | | Overall |
| Team | W | L | T | W | | L | | T |
|---|---|---|---|---|---|---|---|---|
| Central Michigan | | – | | 1 | – | 0 | – | 0 |
| Lake Forest | | – | | 1 | – | 0 | – | 0 |
| Haskell | | – | | 9 | – | 1 | – | 0 |
| North Dakota Agricultural | | – | | 8 | – | 1 | – | 1 |
| Ohio State | | – | | 8 | – | 1 | – | 1 |
| Nebraska | | – | | 6 | – | 1 | – | 1 |
| Beloit | | – | | 7 | – | 1 | – | 2 |
| Kirksville Osteopaths | | – | | 7 | – | 2 | – | 1 |
| Washburn | | – | | 6 | – | 2 | – | 0 |
| Wittenberg | | – | | 5 | – | 2 | – | 1 |
| Drake | | – | | 6 | – | 3 | – | 0 |
| Doane | | – | | 2 | – | 1 | – | 0 |
| Notre Dame | | – | | 6 | – | 3 | – | 1 |
| Fairmount | | – | | 5 | – | 3 | – | 0 |
| Detroit College | | – | | 3 | – | 2 | – | 0 |
| South Dakota Agricultural | | – | | 3 | – | 2 | – | 0 |
| Washington University | | – | | 3 | – | 2 | – | 1 |
| Carthage | | – | | 4 | – | 3 | – | 0 |
| Wabash | | – | | 5 | – | 4 | – | 0 |
| Lincoln (MO) | | – | | 2 | – | 2 | – | 0 |
| Missouri | | – | | 4 | – | 4 | – | 1 |
| Northern Illinois State | | – | | 2 | – | 2 | – | 2 |
| Iowa State Normal | | – | | 3 | – | 4 | – | 1 |
| Buchtel | | – | | 2 | – | 3 | – | 1 |
| Cincinnati | | – | | 3 | – | 5 | – | 1 |
| Ohio | | – | | 2 | – | 4 | – | 1 |
| Kansas State | | – | | 2 | – | 4 | – | 0 |
| Kansas | | – | | 2 | – | 5 | – | 2 |
| Ohio Wesleyan | | – | | 2 | – | 5 | – | 2 |
| Iowa State | | – | | 2 | – | 5 | – | 1 |
| Butler | | – | | 0 | – | 1 | – | 3 |
| Heidelberg | | – | | 0 | – | 2 | – | 2 |
| Chicago P&S | | – | | 1 | – | 3 | – | 0 |
| Mount Union | | – | | 1 | – | 4 | – | 1 |
| Miami (OH) | | – | | 0 | – | 4 | – | 0 |

The 1900 Detroit College Tigers football team was an American football team that represented Detroit College (renamed the University of Detroit in 1911) as an independent during the 1900 college football season. In its first season under head coach John C. Mackey, the team compiled a 3–2 record and outscored its opponents by a total of 71 to 23. Five of the team's opponents were high schools. The only intercollegiate game was an 11–0 victory over Loyola University Chicago.

=== Schedule ===
| Date | Opponent | Site | Result | Source |
|---|---|---|---|---|
| | Detroit University School | Detroit, MI | W 23–0 | |
| | Wyandotte High School | | W 17–0 | |
| October 27 | Ann Arbor High School | Detroit Athletic Club grounds; Detroit, MI | L 0–11 | |
| November 3 | Central High School | Detroit Athletic Club grounds; Detroit, MI | L 5–6 | |
| November 29 | St. Ignatius College Chicago | Marshall Field; Chicago, IL | W 11–0 | |

== 1901 ==
1901 Detroit College Tigers football
- Conference: Independent
- Record: 3–3
- Head coach: John C. Mackey (2nd season)

1901 Midwestern college football independents records
| | Conf. | | | Overall |
| Team | W | L | T | W | | L | | T |
|---|---|---|---|---|---|---|---|---|
| Saint Louis | | – | | 10 | – | 0 | – | 0 |
| North Dakota Agricultural | | – | | 7 | – | 0 | – | 0 |
| Marquette | | – | | 4 | – | 0 | – | 1 |
| Northern Illinois State | | – | | 6 | – | 1 | – | 0 |
| Notre Dame | | – | | 8 | – | 1 | – | 1 |
| Ohio Wesleyan | | – | | 8 | – | 2 | – | 0 |
| Kirksville Osteopaths | | – | | 10 | – | 3 | – | 0 |
| Nebraska | | – | | 6 | – | 2 | – | 0 |
| Ohio | | – | | 6 | – | 1 | – | 2 |
| Doane | | – | | 3 | – | 1 | – | 0 |
| Haskell | | – | | 6 | – | 2 | – | 0 |
| Lake Forest | | – | | 10 | – | 5 | – | 0 |
| Ohio State | | – | | 5 | – | 3 | – | 1 |
| Washington University | | – | | 5 | – | 3 | – | 1 |
| Ohio Medical | | – | | 5 | – | 3 | – | 1 |
| Iowa State Normal | | – | | 5 | – | 3 | – | 2 |
| South Dakota Agricultural | | – | | 3 | – | 2 | – | 0 |
| Beloit | | – | | 5 | – | 3 | – | 3 |
| Washburn | | – | | 3 | – | 2 | – | 3 |
| Carthage | | – | | 1 | – | 1 | – | 0 |
| Drake | | – | | 4 | – | 4 | – | 0 |
| Detroit College | | – | | 3 | – | 3 | – | 0 |
| Mount Union | | – | | 5 | – | 5 | – | 1 |
| Wittenberg | | – | | 4 | – | 4 | – | 0 |
| Kansas State | | – | | 3 | – | 4 | – | 1 |
| Iowa State | | – | | 2 | – | 6 | – | 2 |
| Kansas | | – | | 3 | – | 5 | – | 2 |
| Wabash | | – | | 4 | – | 7 | – | 0 |
| Fairmount | | – | | 3 | – | 6 | – | 0 |
| Heidelberg | | – | | 1 | – | 3 | – | 1 |
| Miami (OH) | | – | | 1 | – | 3 | – | 1 |
| Cincinnati | | – | | 1 | – | 4 | – | 1 |
| Case | | – | | 2 | – | 7 | – | 0 |
| Missouri | | – | | 1 | – | 6 | – | 1 |
| Butler | | – | | 0 | – | 1 | – | 0 |
| Chicago Eclectic Medical | | – | | 0 | – | 3 | – | 0 |

The 1901 Detroit College Tigers football team was an American football team that represented Detroit College (renamed the University of Detroit in 1911) as an independent during the 1901 college football season. In its second season under head coach John C. Mackey, the team compiled a 3–3 record and outscored its opponents by a combined total of 66 to 58. Four of the team's opponents were high schools, and a fifth game was played against alumni. The only intercollegiate game was an 11–0 victory over Detroit Business University.

=== Schedule ===
| Date | Time | Opponent | Site | Result | Attendance | Source |
|---|---|---|---|---|---|---|
| October 5 | | Detroit University School | Detroit, MI | L 11–12 | | |
| October 18 | | Mount Clemens High School | Mount Clemens, MI | L 11–24 | | |
| October 24 | | Western High School | Bennett Park; Detroit, MI | W 12–5 | | |
| November 20 | 4:00 p.m. | Detroit Business University | Bennett Park; Detroit, MI | W 11–0 | 350 | |
| | | Central High School | Detroit, MI | L 5–6 | | |
| November 28 | | Detroit College alumni | Bennett Park; Detroit | W 16–11 | | |

== 1902 ==
1902 Detroit College Tigers football
- Conference: Independent
- Record: 3–3
- Head coach: Edward J. Ryan (1st season)

1902 Midwestern college football independents records
| | Conf. | | | Overall |
| Team | W | L | T | W | | L | | T |
|---|---|---|---|---|---|---|---|---|
| Nebraska | | – | | 9 | – | 0 | – | 0 |
| South Dakota | | – | | 9 | – | 0 | – | 0 |
| North Dakota Agricultural | | – | | 4 | – | 0 | – | 0 |
| Central Michigan | | – | | 4 | – | 0 | – | 0 |
| Ohio Medical | | – | | 9 | – | 1 | – | 0 |
| Marquette | | – | | 6 | – | 1 | – | 1 |
| Knox | | – | | 9 | – | 2 | – | 0 |
| Northern Illinois State | | – | | 5 | – | 1 | – | 1 |
| Haskell | | – | | 8 | – | 2 | – | 1 |
| Notre Dame | | – | | 6 | – | 2 | – | 1 |
| Drake | | – | | 5 | – | 2 | – | 1 |
| Lincoln (MO) | | – | | 2 | – | 1 | – | 0 |
| Mount Union | | – | | 6 | – | 3 | – | 0 |
| Iowa State | | – | | 6 | – | 3 | – | 1 |
| Carthage | | – | | 2 | – | 1 | – | 1 |
| Cincinnati | | – | | 4 | – | 2 | – | 2 |
| Missouri | | – | | 5 | – | 3 | – | 0 |
| Miami (OH) | | – | | 5 | – | 3 | – | 1 |
| Kansas | | – | | 6 | – | 4 | – | 0 |
| South Dakota Agricultural | | – | | 3 | – | 2 | – | 0 |
| Fairmount | | – | | 4 | – | 3 | – | 1 |
| Detroit College | | – | | 3 | – | 3 | – | 0 |
| Lake Forest | | – | | 4 | – | 4 | – | 1 |
| Lincoln (MO) | | – | | 1 | – | 1 | – | 0 |
| Western Illinois | | – | | 2 | – | 2 | – | 0 |
| Wittenberg | | – | | 3 | – | 4 | – | 2 |
| Washburn | | – | | 3 | – | 4 | – | 0 |
| Doane | | – | | 2 | – | 3 | – | 0 |
| Heidelberg | | – | | 3 | – | 5 | – | 1 |
| Wabash | | – | | 2 | – | 4 | – | 2 |
| Buchtel | | – | | 2 | – | 5 | – | 0 |
| Washington University | | – | | 2 | – | 6 | – | 1 |
| Butler | | – | | 1 | – | 3 | – | 0 |
| Kansas State | | – | | 2 | – | 6 | – | 0 |
| Michigan State Normal | | – | | 1 | – | 5 | – | 1 |
| Iowa State Normal | | – | | 1 | – | 6 | – | 1 |
| Ohio | | – | | 0 | – | 5 | – | 1 |

The 1902 Detroit College Tigers football team was an American football team that represented Detroit College (renamed the University of Detroit in 1911) as an independent during the 1902 college football season. In its first season under head coachEdward J. Ryan, the team compiled a 3–3 record and were outscored its opponents by a combined total of 33 to 32. The team opened the season with an 11-0 loss to Michigan Agricultural.

=== Schedule ===
| Date | Opponent | Site | Result | Source |
|---|---|---|---|---|
| October 4 | Michigan Agricultural | College Field; East Lansing, MI | L 0–11 | |
| October 18 | Walkerville | | W 11–0 | |
| November 1 | Y.M.C. of Saint Vincent's Church | Bennett Park; Detroit, MI | L 0–5 | |
| November 5 | Central High School | Detroit Athletic Club grounds; Detroit, MI | W 11–0 | |
| November 15 | Detroit University School | Detroit, MI | L 5–17 | |
| November 27 | Seldens | Detroit Athletic Club grounds; Detroit, MI | W 5–0 | |

== 1903 ==
1903 Detroit College Tigers football
- Conference: Independent
- Record: 3–4
- Head coach: W. Alfred Debo (1st season)

1903 Midwestern college football independents records
| | Conf. | | | Overall |
| Team | W | L | T | W | | L | | T |
|---|---|---|---|---|---|---|---|---|
| Nebraska | | – | | 11 | – | 0 | – | 0 |
| North Dakota | | – | | 7 | – | 0 | – | 0 |
| Central Michigan | | – | | 6 | – | 0 | – | 0 |
| Notre Dame | | – | | 8 | – | 0 | – | 1 |
| Iowa State | | – | | 8 | – | 1 | – | 0 |
| Marquette | | – | | 7 | – | 1 | – | 0 |
| Lake Forest | | – | | 6 | – | 1 | – | 0 |
| North Dakota Agricultural | | – | | 5 | – | 1 | – | 0 |
| Haskell | | – | | 7 | – | 2 | – | 0 |
| St. Xavier | | – | | 7 | – | 2 | – | 0 |
| Fairmount | | – | | 6 | – | 2 | – | 0 |
| Wabash | | – | | 9 | – | 3 | – | 0 |
| Wittenberg | | – | | 5 | – | 2 | – | 1 |
| Doane | | – | | 2 | – | 1 | – | 0 |
| Northern Illinois State | | – | | 4 | – | 2 | – | 0 |
| American Medical | | – | | 6 | – | 3 | – | 0 |
| Kansas | | – | | 6 | – | 3 | – | 0 |
| Drake | | – | | 5 | – | 3 | – | 0 |
| Kirksville Osteopaths | | – | | 5 | – | 3 | – | 0 |
| Iowa State Normal | | – | | 4 | – | 3 | – | 1 |
| Ohio Medical | | – | | 5 | – | 4 | – | 0 |
| Lincoln (MO) | | – | | 1 | – | 1 | – | 0 |
| Michigan State Normal | | – | | 4 | – | 4 | – | 0 |
| Washington University | | – | | 4 | – | 4 | – | 2 |
| Heidelberg | | – | | 3 | – | 4 | – | 2 |
| Kansas State | | – | | 3 | – | 4 | – | 1 |
| Detroit College | | – | | 3 | – | 4 | – | 0 |
| Shurtleff | | – | | 2 | – | 4 | – | 1 |
| Ohio | | – | | 2 | – | 4 | – | 0 |
| South Dakota Agricultural | | – | | 1 | – | 2 | – | 0 |
| Mount Union | | – | | 2 | – | 5 | – | 1 |
| DePauw | | – | | 2 | – | 6 | – | 1 |
| Miami (OH) | | – | | 1 | – | 4 | – | 0 |
| Missouri | | – | | 1 | – | 7 | – | 1 |
| Western Illinois | | – | | 0 | – | 3 | – | 1 |
| Cincinnati | | – | | 1 | – | 8 | – | 0 |
| Baldwin–Wallace | | – | | 0 | – | 1 | – | 0 |
| Buchtel | | – | | 0 | – | 2 | – | 0 |
| Butler | | – | | 0 | – | 3 | – | 0 |
| Chicago P&S | | – | | 0 | – | 4 | – | 0 |

The 1903 Detroit College Tigers football team was an American football team that represented Detroit College (renamed the University of Detroit in 1911) as an independent during the 1903 college football season. In its first season under head coach W. Alfred Debo, the team compiled a 3–4 record and were outscored its opponents by a combined total of 71 to 23. The team lost to the Michigan freshman team by a 45–0 score.

=== Schedule ===
| Date | Opponent | Site | Result | Source |
|---|---|---|---|---|
| October 3 | Detroit Athletic Club | Detroit, MI | L 0–15 | |
| October 10 | Michigan State Normal | Detroit Athletic Club field; Detroit, MI | W 6–0 | |
| October 17 | Michigan freshmen | Detroit Athletic Club grounds; Detroit, MI | L 0–45 | |
| October 29 | Polish Seminary | Detroit Athletic Club grounds; Detroit, MI | W 5–0 | |
| November 5 | Eastern High School | Detroit Athletic Club field; Detroit, MI | L 5–6 | |
| November 12 | at Michigan State Normal | Ypsilanti, MI | L 0–5 | |
| November 26 | Central High School | Detroit Athletic Club grounds; Detroit, MI | W 12–0 | |

== 1904 ==
1904 Detroit College Tigers football
- Conference: Independent
- Record: 4–2
- Head coach: Alfred W. Debo (2nd season)

1904 Midwestern college football independents records
| | Conf. | | | Overall |
| Team | W | L | T | W | | L | | T |
|---|---|---|---|---|---|---|---|---|
| Saint Louis | | – | | 10 | – | 0 | – | 0 |
| Bethany (KS) | | – | | 7 | – | 0 | – | 0 |
| Northern Illinois State | | – | | 5 | – | 0 | – | 0 |
| Cape Girardeau Normal | | – | | 2 | – | 0 | – | 0 |
| Haskell | | – | | 8 | – | 1 | – | 0 |
| Cincinnati | | – | | 7 | – | 1 | – | 0 |
| Butler | | – | | 6 | – | 1 | – | 0 |
| Doane | | – | | 5 | – | 1 | – | 0 |
| Kansas | | – | | 8 | – | 1 | – | 1 |
| DePauw | | – | | 8 | – | 2 | – | 0 |
| Iowa State | | – | | 7 | – | 2 | – | 0 |
| Ohio Northern | | – | | 7 | – | 2 | – | 1 |
| Michigan State Normal | | – | | 6 | – | 2 | – | 0 |
| Wittenberg | | – | | 6 | – | 2 | – | 0 |
| Marquette | | – | | 5 | – | 2 | – | 0 |
| Nebraska | | – | | 7 | – | 3 | – | 0 |
| Detroit College | | – | | 4 | – | 2 | – | 0 |
| South Dakota State | | – | | 4 | – | 2 | – | 1 |
| Notre Dame | | – | | 5 | – | 3 | – | 0 |
| Iowa State Normal | | – | | 5 | – | 3 | – | 1 |
| Western Illinois | | – | | 6 | – | 4 | – | 0 |
| Heidelberg | | – | | 6 | – | 4 | – | 1 |
| Drake | | – | | 5 | – | 4 | – | 0 |
| Carthage | | – | | 0 | – | 0 | – | 2 |
| North Dakota Agricultural | | – | | 3 | – | 3 | – | 0 |
| Wabash | | – | | 4 | – | 4 | – | 0 |
| Fairmount | | – | | 4 | – | 5 | – | 0 |
| Lake Forest | | – | | 3 | – | 5 | – | 1 |
| Ohio Medical | | – | | 2 | – | 4 | – | 2 |
| Washington University | | – | | 4 | – | 7 | – | 0 |
| Ohio | | – | | 2 | – | 4 | – | 1 |
| Missouri | | – | | 3 | – | 6 | – | 0 |
| Mount Union | | – | | 2 | – | 6 | – | 0 |
| Miami (OH) | | – | | 1 | – | 5 | – | 0 |
| Kansas State | | – | | 1 | – | 6 | – | 0 |
| American Medical | | – | | 0 | – | 3 | – | 0 |

The 1904 Detroit College Tigers football team was an American football team that represented Detroit College (renamed the University of Detroit in 1911) as an independent during the 1904 college football season. In its second season under head coach Alfred W. Debo, the team compiled a 4–2 record and outscored its opponents by a combined total of 76 to 28.

=== Schedule ===
| Date | Opponent | Site | Result | Source |
|---|---|---|---|---|
| October 8 | at Wyandotte | Wyandotte, MI | W 12–11 | |
| October 13 | at Delray High School | Solvay grounds; Detroit, MI | W 6–0 | |
| October 22 | Detroit College of Medicine | Bennett Park; Detroit, MI | W 44–0 | |
| October 29 | Metropolitan Business College | Bennett Park; Detroit, MI | L 4–11 | |
| November 3 | at Mount Clemens High School | Mount Clemens, MI | W 10–0 | |
| November 24 | Eastern High School | Bennett Park; Detroit, MI | L 0–6 | |

== 1905 ==
1905 Detroit College Tigers football
- Conference: Independent
- Record: 1–0
- Head coach: Jerry Girardin (1st season)

1905 Midwestern college football independents records
| | Conf. | | | Overall |
| Team | W | L | T | W | | L | | T |
|---|---|---|---|---|---|---|---|---|
| Lincoln (MO) | | – | | 3 | – | 0 | – | 0 |
| Detroit College | | – | | 1 | – | 0 | – | 0 |
| Kansas | | – | | 10 | – | 1 | – | 0 |
| Central Michigan | | – | | 7 | – | 1 | – | 0 |
| Doane | | – | | 5 | – | 1 | – | 0 |
| Nebraska | | – | | 9 | – | 2 | – | 0 |
| Saint Louis | | – | | 7 | – | 2 | – | 0 |
| Butler | | – | | 7 | – | 2 | – | 1 |
| Kansas State | | – | | 6 | – | 2 | – | 0 |
| Northern Illinois State | | – | | 3 | – | 1 | – | 1 |
| Carthage | | – | | 4 | – | 2 | – | 0 |
| Western Illinois | | – | | 4 | – | 2 | – | 0 |
| Iowa State | | – | | 6 | – | 3 | – | 0 |
| Washington University | | – | | 7 | – | 3 | – | 2 |
| Wittenberg | | – | | 7 | – | 4 | – | 0 |
| Heidelberg | | – | | 6 | – | 4 | – | 0 |
| Iowa State Normal | | – | | 5 | – | 3 | – | 2 |
| Cincinnati | | – | | 5 | – | 3 | – | 0 |
| Miami (OH) | | – | | 4 | – | 3 | – | 0 |
| Missouri | | – | | 5 | – | 4 | – | 0 |
| Notre Dame | | – | | 5 | – | 4 | – | 0 |
| Fairmount | | – | | 5 | – | 4 | – | 1 |
| Haskell | | – | | 5 | – | 4 | – | 1 |
| Lake Forest | | – | | 6 | – | 5 | – | 0 |
| Wabash | | – | | 6 | – | 5 | – | 0 |
| Drake | | – | | 4 | – | 4 | – | 0 |
| Michigan State Normal | | – | | 4 | – | 4 | – | 0 |
| Marquette | | – | | 3 | – | 4 | – | 0 |
| South Dakota State | | – | | 2 | – | 3 | – | 0 |
| Ohio | | – | | 2 | – | 5 | – | 2 |
| DePauw | | – | | 3 | – | 6 | – | 0 |
| Mount Union | | – | | 2 | – | 6 | – | 0 |
| North Dakota Agricultural | | – | | 1 | – | 4 | – | 1 |
| Baldwin–Wallace | | – | | 0 | – | 1 | – | 0 |
| Chicago P&S | | – | | 0 | – | 1 | – | 0 |
| St. Mary's (OH) | | – | | 0 | – | 3 | – | 0 |

The 1905 Detroit College Tigers football team was an American football team that represented Detroit College (renamed the University of Detroit in 1911) as an independent during the 1905 college football season. Jerry Girardin was hired in mid-October as the team's head coach. The team initially had a schedule with six opponents. However, on November 9, the college's president, Rev. Kellinger, refused to allow the football team to play the Detroit University School and declared that football "as it is played today is altogether too rough" and that the game was also too expensive. In response, coach Girardin said he would never coach a team of the college again. The team was then disbanded.

=== Schedule ===
| Date | Opponent | Site | Result | Source |
|---|---|---|---|---|
| November 2 | at Monroe High School | Monroe, MI | W 26–0 | |
| November 4 | Detroit College of Law | Clark Park; Detroit, MI | ? | |
| November 11 | at Detroit Athletic Club | Detroit Athletic Club grounds; Detroit, MI | Cancelled | |
| November 16 | at Jackson High School | Jackson, MI | Cancelled | |
| November 23 | at Michigan State Normal | Ypsilanti, MI | Cancelled | |
| November 30 | Eastern High School | Detroit, MI | Cancelled | |

== 1906 ==
1906 Detroit College Tigers football
- Conference: Independent
- Record: 4–2–1
- Head coach: Edward J. Ryan (2nd season)

1906 Midwestern college football independents records
| | Conf. | | | Overall |
| Team | W | L | T | W | | L | | T |
|---|---|---|---|---|---|---|---|---|
| Saint Louis | | – | | 11 | – | 0 | – | 0 |
| North Dakota Agricultural | | – | | 5 | – | 0 | – | 0 |
| Butler | | – | | 1 | – | 0 | – | 0 |
| Michigan State Normal | | – | | 5 | – | 0 | – | 1 |
| Iowa State | | – | | 9 | – | 1 | – | 0 |
| Ohio | | – | | 7 | – | 1 | – | 0 |
| Notre Dame | | – | | 6 | – | 1 | – | 0 |
| St. Mary's (OH) | | – | | 5 | – | 1 | – | 0 |
| Fairmount | | – | | 7 | – | 1 | – | 2 |
| Wabash | | – | | 5 | – | 1 | – | 1 |
| South Dakota State | | – | | 3 | – | 1 | – | 0 |
| Kansas | | – | | 7 | – | 2 | – | 2 |
| Kansas State | | – | | 5 | – | 2 | – | 0 |
| Missouri | | – | | 5 | – | 2 | – | 1 |
| Detroit College | | – | | 4 | – | 2 | – | 1 |
| Northern Illinois State | | – | | 4 | – | 2 | – | 1 |
| Carthage | | – | | 3 | – | 2 | – | 0 |
| Lake Forest | | – | | 3 | – | 2 | – | 0 |
| Nebraska | | – | | 6 | – | 4 | – | 0 |
| Wittenberg | | – | | 5 | – | 4 | – | 1 |
| Heidelberg | | – | | 3 | – | 3 | – | 1 |
| Washington University | | – | | 2 | – | 2 | – | 2 |
| Beloit | | – | | 3 | – | 4 | – | 1 |
| Franklin | | – | | 3 | – | 4 | – | 0 |
| Doane | | – | | 2 | – | 3 | – | 0 |
| Shurtleff | | – | | 2 | – | 4 | – | 2 |
| Western State Normal | | – | | 1 | – | 2 | – | 0 |
| Mount Union | | – | | 2 | – | 5 | – | 1 |
| Drake | | – | | 2 | – | 5 | – | 0 |
| Haskell | | – | | 2 | – | 5 | – | 0 |
| Marquette | | – | | 1 | – | 4 | – | 2 |
| Chicago P&S | | – | | 0 | – | 1 | – | 1 |
| Cincinnati | | – | | 0 | – | 7 | – | 2 |
| Western Illinois | | – | | 0 | – | 3 | – | 0 |

The 1906 Detroit College Tigers football team was an American football team that represented Detroit College (renamed the University of Detroit in 1911) as an independent during the 1906 college football season. In its second season under head coach Edward J. Ryan, the team compiled a 4–2–1 record and outscored its opponents by a combined total of 52 to 21.

The football team had disbanded during the 1905 season. In early October 1906, the college faculty decided upon further consideration to allow students to participate in sports, on the condition that the athletic association bear all expense.

=== Schedule ===
| Date | Opponent | Site | Result | Source |
|---|---|---|---|---|
| October 11 | at Mount Clemens High School | Crocker Field; Mount Clemens, MI | W 5–0 | |
| October 25 | at Michigan State Normal | Ypsilanti, MI | L 0–6 | |
| November 3 | Ypsilanti High School | Detroit Athletic Club field; Detroit, MI | W 28–0 | |
| November 8 | at Adrian | Adrian, MI | T 0–0 | |
| November 15 | Eastern High School | Detroit Athletic Club field; Detroit, MI | W 2–0 | |
| November 24 | at Delray High School | Solvay grounds; Detroit, MI | W 17–11 | |
| November 29 | Hudson High School | Bennett Park; Detroit, MI | L 0–4 | |

== 1907 ==
1907 Detroit College Tigers football
- Conference: Independent
- Record: 1–3
- Head coach: George A. Kelly (1st season)

1907 Midwestern college football independents records
| | Conf. | | | Overall |
| Team | W | L | T | W | | L | | T |
|---|---|---|---|---|---|---|---|---|
| Marquette | | – | | 6 | – | 0 | – | 0 |
| North Dakota Agricultural | | – | | 3 | – | 0 | – | 0 |
| Lincoln (MO) | | – | | 1 | – | 0 | – | 0 |
| Notre Dame | | – | | 6 | – | 0 | – | 1 |
| Miami (OH) | | – | | 6 | – | 1 | – | 0 |
| Michigan | | – | | 5 | – | 1 | – | 0 |
| Mount Union | | – | | 9 | – | 2 | – | 0 |
| Fairmount | | – | | 8 | – | 2 | – | 0 |
| Iowa State | | – | | 6 | – | 2 | – | 0 |
| Lake Forest | | – | | 4 | – | 1 | – | 1 |
| South Dakota State | | – | | 5 | – | 2 | – | 0 |
| St. Vincent's (IL) | | – | | 5 | – | 2 | – | 0 |
| Wabash | | – | | 5 | – | 2 | – | 0 |
| Saint Louis | | – | | 7 | – | 3 | – | 0 |
| Western State Normal | | – | | 4 | – | 2 | – | 1 |
| Kansas State | | – | | 5 | – | 3 | – | 0 |
| Michigan State Normal | | – | | 3 | – | 2 | – | 0 |
| Wittenberg | | – | | 5 | – | 4 | – | 0 |
| Central Michigan | | – | | 3 | – | 3 | – | 0 |
| Drake | | – | | 3 | – | 4 | – | 1 |
| Ohio | | – | | 3 | – | 4 | – | 1 |
| Western Illinois | | – | | 2 | – | 3 | – | 0 |
| Franklin | | – | | 3 | – | 5 | – | 1 |
| Heidelberg | | – | | 2 | – | 4 | – | 1 |
| Butler | | – | | 1 | – | 3 | – | 2 |
| Carthage | | – | | 2 | – | 5 | – | 0 |
| Haskell | | – | | 2 | – | 6 | – | 1 |
| Chicago P&S | | – | | 1 | – | 3 | – | 0 |
| Detroit College | | – | | 1 | – | 3 | – | 0 |
| Northern Illinois State | | – | | 1 | – | 4 | – | 1 |
| Doane | | – | | 1 | – | 5 | – | 0 |
| St. Mary's (OH) | | – | | 0 | – | 4 | – | 0 |
| Baldwin–Wallace | | – | | 0 | – | 6 | – | 0 |

The 1907 Detroit College Tigers football team was an American football team that represented Detroit College (renamed the University of Detroit in 1911) as an independent during the 1907 college football season. In its first season under head coach George A. Kelly, the team compiled a 1–3 record and was outscored by its opponents by a combined total of 59 to 6.

=== Schedule ===
| Date | Opponent | Site | Result | Source |
|---|---|---|---|---|
| October 3 | at Michigan Agricultural | East Lansing, MI | L 0–17 | |
| October 17 | at Adrian | Adrian, MI | W 6–5 | |
| October 26 | Michigan State Normal | Detroit Athletic Club grounds; Detroit, MI | L 0–7 | |
| November 9 | Detroit Athletic Club | Detroit, MI | L 0–30 | |

== 1908 ==
No team

== 1909 ==
1909 Detroit College Tigers football
- Conference: Independent
- Record: 3–1–2
- Head coach: George A. Kelly (2nd season)

1909 Midwestern college football independents records
| | Conf. | | | Overall |
| Team | W | L | T | W | | L | | T |
|---|---|---|---|---|---|---|---|---|
| Iowa State Normal | | – | | 6 | – | 0 | – | 0 |
| Notre Dame | | – | | 7 | – | 0 | – | 1 |
| Michigan Agricultural | | – | | 8 | – | 1 | – | 0 |
| Carthage | | – | | 6 | – | 1 | – | 0 |
| Michigan | | – | | 6 | – | 1 | – | 0 |
| Western State Normal | | – | | 6 | – | 1 | – | 0 |
| Mount Union | | – | | 8 | – | 2 | – | 0 |
| Lake Forest | | – | | 5 | – | 1 | – | 1 |
| Haskell | | – | | 7 | – | 2 | – | 0 |
| Detroit College | | – | | 3 | – | 1 | – | 2 |
| Butler | | – | | 5 | – | 3 | – | 0 |
| Central Michigan | | – | | 4 | – | 3 | – | 0 |
| St. Mary's (OH) | | – | | 4 | – | 3 | – | 0 |
| Cincinnati | | – | | 4 | – | 3 | – | 1 |
| Doane | | – | | 3 | – | 2 | – | 3 |
| Buchtel | | – | | 4 | – | 4 | – | 0 |
| Rose Poly | | – | | 4 | – | 4 | – | 0 |
| Marquette | | – | | 2 | – | 2 | – | 1 |
| North Dakota Agricultural | | – | | 2 | – | 2 | – | 1 |
| Wabash | | – | | 3 | – | 4 | – | 1 |
| Miami (OH) | | – | | 3 | – | 4 | – | 0 |
| Ohio | | – | | 2 | – | 4 | – | 2 |
| Saint Louis | | – | | 3 | – | 5 | – | 0 |
| Michigan State Normal | | – | | 2 | – | 4 | – | 0 |
| Western Illinois | | – | | 1 | – | 2 | – | 0 |
| Fairmount | | – | | 2 | – | 5 | – | 1 |
| Northern Illinois State | | – | | 2 | – | 6 | – | 0 |
| South Dakota State | | – | | 1 | – | 3 | – | 0 |
| Heidelberg | | – | | 0 | – | 7 | – | 2 |

The 1909 Detroit College Tigers football team was an American football team that represented Detroit College (later renamed the University of Detroit) as an independent during the 1909 college football season. In its second season under head coach George A. Kelly, the team compiled a 3–1–2 record and shut out four opponents, but was outscored by its opponents by a combined total of 35 to 17. The team opened the season with a 27–0 loss to Michigan Agricultural (later renamed Michigan State University).

=== Schedule ===
| Date | Opponent | Site | Result | Source |
|---|---|---|---|---|
| October 7 | at Michigan Agricultural | East Lansing, MI | L 0–27 | |
| October 16 | Olivet | Detroit Athletic Club; Detroit, MI | T 0–0 | |
| October 21 | at Adrian | Adrian, MI | W 5–0 | |
| October 29 | Hillsdale | Detroit Athletic Club; Detroit, MI | W 3–0 | |
| November 4 | at Findlay | Findlay, OH | T 0–0 | |
| November 13 | Michigan State Normal | Detroit Athletic Club; Detroit, MI | W 9–8 | |
