= 1896 Washburn Ichabods football team =

American college football season

1896 Washburn Ichabods football
- Conference: Independent
- Record: 6–1–1
- Head coach: Walter Griffiths (1st season)
- Home stadium: Washburn grounds, Athletic Park

1896 Midwestern college football independents records
	Conf.			Overall
Team	W	L	T	W		L		T
Carthage		–		4	–	0	–	0
St. Ignatius College Chicago		–		1	–	0	–	0
Washburn		–		6	–	1	–	1
Iowa Agricultural		–		8	–	2	–	0
Central Michigan		–		3	–	1	–	0
Miami (OH)		–		3	–	1	–	0
Ohio Wesleyan		–		6	–	2	–	0
Detroit College		–		5	–	2	–	0
North Dakota Agricultural		–		3	–	1	–	1
Heidelberg		–		2	–	1	–	0
Ohio		–		4	–	2	–	1
Indiana		–		5	–	3	–	0
Beloit		–		2	–	1	–	3
Butler		–		4	–	3	–	0
Iowa State Normal		–		4	–	3	–	0
Notre Dame		–		4	–	3	–	0
Cincinnati		–		4	–	3	–	1
Wittenberg		–		5	–	4	–	0
Baldwin–Wallace		–		2	–	2	–	0
College of Emporia		–		2	–	3	–	0
Ohio State		–		5	–	5	–	1
Lake Forest		–		3	–	4	–	1
Mount Union		–		3	–	4	–	1
Wabash		–		3	–	4	–	0
Drake		–		2	–	3	–	0
Chicago P&S		–		2	–	4	–	2
Hillsdale		–		2	–	4	–	0
Kansas State		–		0	–	1	–	1
Indiana State Normal		–		0	–	1	–	0
Buchtel		–		0	–	1	–	0
Washington University		–		0	–	2	–	0
Doane		–		0	–	5	–	0
Haskell		–		0	–	5	–	0

The 1896 Washburn Ichabods football team represented Washburn College—now known as Washburn University—as an independent during the 1896 college football season. In their first and only season under head coach Walter Griffiths, the Ichabods compiled a record of 6–1–1.

== Schedule ==
Date	Opponent	Site	Result	Attendance	Source
September 28	Fort Riley	Washburn grounds; Topeka, KS	T 4–4		
October 10	Topeka Independents	Athletic Park; Topeka, KS	W 28–0		
October 20	at College of Emporia	Emporia, KS	No contest		
October 24	at Midland	Atchison, KS	W 32–9		
October 30	Haskell	Athletic Park; Topeka, KS	W 8–6		
November 7	at St. Mary's (KS)	Leavenworth, KS	L 0–40		
November 14	Midland	Topeka, KS	W 30–0		
November 21	Kansas City Medics	Topeka, KS	W 10–0		
November 26	Topeka Independents	Athletic Park; Topeka, KS	W 14–0	200	
