= Jack Simmons (American football) =

American football player (1924–1978)

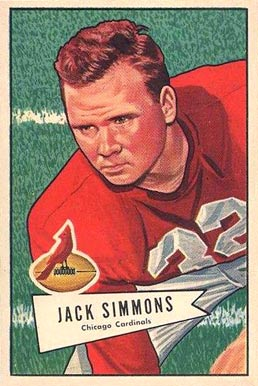
- Simmons on a 1952 Bowman football card

No. 73, 53, 32, 50
- Positions: Center, guard, tackle

Personal information
- Born: October 8, 1924; Grosse Pointe, Michigan, U.S.
- Died: September 17, 1978 (aged 53); Royal Oak, Michigan, U.S.
- Listed height: 6 ft 4 in (1.93 m)
- Listed weight: 236 lb (107 kg)

Career information
- High school: St. Ambrose (Detroit, Michigan)
- College: Maryland; Detroit Mercy (1945-1947)
- NFL draft: 1946: 22nd round, 207th overall pick

Career history
- Baltimore Colts (1948); Detroit Lions (1949–1950); Chicago Cardinals (1951–1956)

Awards and highlights
- Pro Bowl (1956)

Career NFL/AAFC statistics
- Games played: 106
- Games started: 91
- Fumble recoveries: 5
- Stats at Pro Football Reference

John Charles Simmons (October 8, 1924 – September 17, 1978) was an American professional football player who was an offensive lineman in the All-America Football Conference (AAFC) and National Football League (NFL). He played college football for the Maryland Terrapins and Detroit Titans. Simmons spent one year in the AAFC with the Baltimore Colts and eight seasons in the NFL for the Detroit Lions and Chicago Cardinals.
