= 1896 Indiana Hoosiers football team =

American college football season

1896 Indiana Hoosiers football
- Conference: Independent
- Record: 5–3
- Head coach: Madison G. Gonterman (1st season)
- Captain: Emmett O. King
- Home stadium: Athletic Field

1896 Midwestern college football independents records
	Conf.			Overall
Team	W	L	T	W		L		T
Carthage		–		4	–	0	–	0
St. Ignatius College Chicago		–		1	–	0	–	0
Washburn		–		6	–	1	–	1
Iowa Agricultural		–		8	–	2	–	0
Central Michigan		–		3	–	1	–	0
Miami (OH)		–		3	–	1	–	0
Ohio Wesleyan		–		6	–	2	–	0
Detroit College		–		5	–	2	–	0
North Dakota Agricultural		–		3	–	1	–	1
Heidelberg		–		2	–	1	–	0
Ohio		–		4	–	2	–	1
Indiana		–		5	–	3	–	0
Beloit		–		2	–	1	–	3
Butler		–		4	–	3	–	0
Iowa State Normal		–		4	–	3	–	0
Notre Dame		–		4	–	3	–	0
Cincinnati		–		4	–	3	–	1
Wittenberg		–		5	–	4	–	0
Baldwin–Wallace		–		2	–	2	–	0
College of Emporia		–		2	–	3	–	0
Ohio State		–		5	–	5	–	1
Lake Forest		–		3	–	4	–	1
Mount Union		–		3	–	4	–	1
Wabash		–		3	–	4	–	0
Drake		–		2	–	3	–	0
Chicago P&S		–		2	–	4	–	2
Hillsdale		–		2	–	4	–	0
Kansas State		–		0	–	1	–	1
Indiana State Normal		–		0	–	1	–	0
Buchtel		–		0	–	1	–	0
Washington University		–		0	–	2	–	0
Doane		–		0	–	5	–	0
Haskell		–		0	–	5	–	0

The 1896 Indiana Hoosiers football team was an American football team that represented Indiana University Bloomington as an independent during the 1896 college football season. In their first season under head coach Madison G. Gonterman, the Hoosiers compiled a record of 5–3.

== Schedule ==
Date	Time	Opponent	Site	Result	Source
October 3		DePauw	McKeen Athletic Park; Greencastle, IN	L 4–22	
October 10		Noblesville Athletic Club (IN)	Athletic Field; Bloomington, IN	L 6–8	
October 17		Knightstown Athletic Club (IN)	Athletic Field; Bloomington, IN	W 50–0	
October 24	3:00 p.m.	at Butler	Base-ball Park (on East Ohio Street); Indianapolis, IN	W 22–6	
October 31		Cincinnati	Athletic Field; Bloomington, IN	W 16–0	
November 7		Wabash	Athletic Field; Bloomington, IN	W 38–0	
November 14		at Louisville Athletic Club (KY)	League Baseball Park; Louisville, KY	L 14–24	
November 21		DePauw	Athletic Field; Bloomington, IN	W 12–0	

== Personnel ==
=== Roster ===
Name	Personnel	Year
Edgar Allen Binford	Quarterback	
Frank Wayne Ray	Center	
Carl Elbert Endicott	Left Tackle	
Treadway		
Hamilton		
Gillespie		
Sparks	Left Guard	
William D. Youtsler	Left Halfback	
Lee F. Hunt	Right Halfback	
Polk	Right End	
Emmett O. King (C)	Right Guard	
Dodge	Left Tackle	
Daniel Walter Sheek	Left End	
Beardsley	Right Tackle	
Patton		
Scott	Fullback	

=== Staffing ===
- Madison G. Gonterman, coach
- Henry Thew Stephenson, manager
