= Edward J. Ryan =

American football player and coach

Playing career
- 1893–1894: Michigan
- Position: End

Coaching career (HC unless noted)
- 1902: Detroit College
- 1906: Detroit College
- 1908: Ouachita Baptist

Head coaching record
- Overall: 9–10–1 (college)

Edward James Ryan was an American football player and coach. He served as the head football coach at Detroit College—now known as the University of Detroit Mercy for the 1902 and 1906 seasons, compiling a record of 7–5–1. Ryan also coached at Ouachita Baptist University during the 1908 season and for Central High School in Detroit.

Ryan played college football at the University of Michigan and for many seasons with the Detroit Athletic Club.

== Head coaching record ==
=== College ===
| Year | Team | Overall | Conference | Standing | Bowl/playoffs |
|---|---|---|---|---|---|
Detroit College Tigers (Independent) (1902)
| 1902 | Detroit College | 3–3 | | | |
Detroit College Tigers (Independent) (1906)
| 1906 | Detroit College | 4–2–1 | | | |
| Detroit College: | | 7–5–1 | | | |
Ouachita Baptist Tigers (Independent) (1908)
| 1908 | Ouachita Baptist | 2–5 | | | |
| Ouachita Baptist: | | 2–5 | | | |
| Total: | | 9–10–1 | | | |
