= William S. Robinson =

American football coach

Coaching career (HC unless noted)
- 1896–1899: Detroit College

Head coaching record
- Overall: 16–4

William S. Robinson was an American football coach. He served as the head football coach at Detroit College—now known as the University of Detroit Mercy—for four seasons, from 1896 to 1899, compiling a record of 16–4.

== Head coaching record ==
Year	Team	Overall	Conference	Standing	Bowl/playoffs
Detroit College Tigers (Independent) (1896–1899)
1896	Detroit College	5–2			
1897	Detroit College	1–2			
1898	Detroit College	5–0			
1899	Detroit College	5–0			
Detroit College:		16–4			
Total:		16–4			
