= Detroit Titans football =

University of Detroit team, 1896 to 1964

- First season: 1896; 130 years ago
- Last season: 1964; 62 years ago
- Location: Detroit, Michigan, U.S.
- Stadium: University of Detroit Stadium (capacity: 20,000)
- Colors: Red, white, and blue
- All-time record: 308–204–24 (.597)

National championships
- Claimed: 1 (1928)

The Detroit Titans were the college football team which represented the University of Detroit (now University of Detroit Mercy) from 1896 to 1964. The team posted an undefeated season in 1928, staking a claim to a national title. The program was terminated in 1964 for financial reasons.

== History ==
Under head coach Gus Dorais in 1928, the Titans won all nine of their games. Several years later Parke H. Davis, considered to be a "major selector" by the NCAA, named the 1928 team to a share of the national championship.

From 1922 on, the Titans played their home games at University of Detroit Stadium (also known as U of D Stadium, Titan Stadium, and Dinan Field) near McNichols Road (Six Mile Road) and Fairfield Street on the university's McNichols campus.

The football program had incurred large losses since 1951, and was discontinued after the 1964 season. At the time of the sport's termination, university president Rev. Laurence V. Britt stated that the institution "does not currently have and does not foresee any prospects of its having the substantial funds" required to continue the program.

== Conference affiliations ==
Detroit was both independent and affiliated with the Missouri Valley Conference.

- Unknown (1896–)
- Independent (−1947)
- Missouri Valley Conference (1948–1956)
- Independent (1957–1964)

== Championships ==
=== National championships ===
Detroit won its only national championship in 1928, with Parke H. Davis selecting both Detroit and Georgia Tech. The school claims this championship.

Year	Selectors	Coach	Record
1928	Parke H. Davis	Gus Dorais	9–0

== Head coaches ==
Head Coach	Years	Seasons	Record	Pct.
William S. Robinson	1896–1899	4	13–5–1	.700
John C. Mackey	1900–1901	2	6–6–0	.500
Edward J. Ryan	1902, 1906	2	7–5–1	.577
Alfred W. Debo	1903–1904	2	6–6–0	.500
George A. Kelly	1907, 1909–1910	3	7–5–2	.571
Royal R. Campbell	1911–1912	2	8–6–1	.567
George M. Lawton	1913–1914	2	6–6–3	.500
Harry Costello	1915–1916	2	4–7–2	.385
James F. Duffy	1917, 1919–1922, 1924	6	43–12–1	.777
Germany Schulz	1923	1	4–3–2	.556
Gus Dorais	1925–1942	18	113–48–7	.693
Chuck Baer	1945–1950	6	35–21–1	.623
Dutch Clark	1951–1953	3	13–17–0	.433
Wally Fromhart	1954–1958	5	19–25–2	.435
Jim Miller	1959–1961	3	18–10–0	.643
John Idzik	1962–1964	3	6–21–1	.232

== Notable personnel ==
Name	Position	Years	Notes
Grady Alderman	Lineman	1950s	Played in NFL, 1960–1974
Sig Andrusking	Guard	1930s	Played in NFL in 1937
Vince Banonis	Center	1939–1941	Inducted into College Football Hall of Fame
Dan Boisture	End	1947–1948	Head coach at Eastern Michigan, 1967–1973
Lloyd Brazil	Halfback	1927–1929	All-American; inducted into Michigan Sports Hall of Fame
Walt Cassidy	End	1920s	Played in NFL, 1924
Walt Clago	End		Played in NFL, 1921–1922
Bill Dando	Halfback	1956–1968	Head coach at Buffalo, 1977–1979
Andy Farkas	Fullback	1930s	Played for Washington Redskins, 1938–1944
Norm Harvey	Tackle	1920s	Played in NFL, 1925–1929
Harvey Long	Lineman	1920s	Played in NFL, 1929–1930
Elmer Madarik	Halfback	1940s	Played for Detroit Lions 1945–1948
Ted Marchibroda	Quarterback	1950s	Played and coached in the NFL for over 40 years, 1953–1998
John P. Metras	Center	1930s	Inducted into Canadian Football Hall of Fame as a coach
Doug Nott	Halfback	1930s	Played for Detroit Lions in 1935
Bill O'Neill	Halfback	1930s	Played for Detroit Lions in 1935 and Cleveland Rams in 1937
Lee Riley	Defensive back	1950s	Played in NFL and AFL, 1955–1962
Sod Ryan	Tackle	1920s	Played in NFL from 1929 to 1930
Jim Shorter	Defensive back	1960s	Played in NFL, 1948–1956
Jack Simmons	Lineman	1940s	Played in NFL, 1962–1969
Steve Stonebreaker	Linebacker	1960s	Played in NFL, 1962–1968
Tillie Voss	End	1920s	Played in NFL, 1921–1929
