= George A. Kelly =

American football player and coach (1883–1969)

Biographical details
- Born: April 16, 1883; Detroit, Michigan, U.S.
- Died: April 1969 (aged 85–86); Michigan, U.S.

Playing career
- c. 1900s: Detroit
- Positions: End, quarterback

Coaching career (HC unless noted)
- 1907–1910: Detroit College

Head coaching record
- Overall: 7–6–2

George A. Kelly (April 16, 1883 – April 1969) was an American college football player and coach. He was an alumnus of the University of Detroit and Kentucky State University. He later practiced law in Detroit in a partnership with Alex J. Groesbeck.

== Coaching career ==
Kelly was the head football at the University of Detroit Mercy . He held that position for three seasons, from 1907 until 1910. His coaching record at Detroit was 7–5–2.

== Head coaching record ==
Year	Team	Overall	Conference	Standing	Bowl/playoffs
Detroit College Tigers (Independent) (1907–1910)
1907	Detroit College	1–3			
1908	No team				
1909	Detroit College	3–1–2			
1910	Detroit College	3–2			
Detroit College:		7–6–2			
Total:		7–6–2			
