= John C. Mackey =

American football coach

Coaching career (HC unless noted)
- 1900–1901: Detroit College

Head coaching record
- Overall: 6–5

John C. Mackey was an American football coach. He served as the head football coach at Detroit College—now known as the University of Detroit Mercy—for two seasons, from 1900 to 1901, compiling a record of 6–5.

== Head coaching record ==
Year	Team	Overall	Conference	Standing	Bowl/playoffs
Detroit College Tigers (Independent) (1900–1901)
1900	Detroit College	3–2			
1901	Detroit College	3–3			
Detroit College:		6–5			
Total:		6–5			
