= W. Alfred Debo =

American football player, coach, lawyer, and politician (1877–1960)

Biographical details
- Born: November 15, 1877; Wyandotte, Michigan, U.S.
- Died: March 7, 1960 (aged 82)

Playing career
- 1896: Detroit College
- Position: Halfback

Coaching career (HC unless noted)
- 1903–1904: Detroit College

Head coaching record
- Overall: 7–6

W. Alfred Debo (November 15, 1877 – March 7, 1960) was an American college football player and coach, lawyer, and politician. Born in Wyandotte, Michigan, in 1877, he played at the halfback position on the first football team for Detroit College (now known as the University of Detroit Mercy) in 1896. After college, he studied law at the Detroit College of Law, graduating there in 1903. He was also the school's head football coach for the 1903 and 1904 seasons, compiling a 7–6 record. He later served as the chief investigator for the Internal Revenue Service income tax division in Detroit for eight years. He later served as the Democratic Party state chairman, Michigan Parole Board commissioner, and member of the Detroit Board of Assessors. He died in 1960 at age 82.

== Head coaching record ==
=== College ===
Year	Team	Overall	Conference	Standing	Bowl/playoffs
Detroit College Tigers (Independent) (1903–1904)
1903	Detroit College	3–4			
1904	Detroit College	4–2			
Detroit College:		7–6			
Total:		7–6			
