= Jim Miller (American football coach) =

American football player and coach (1920–2006)

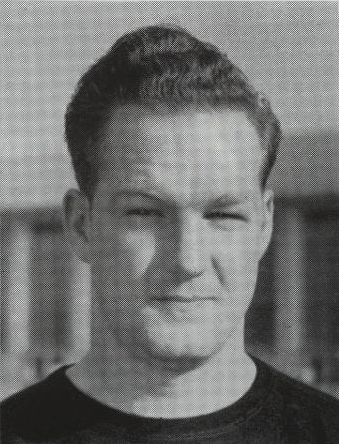

Biographical details
- Born: February 1, 1920; Massillon, Ohio, U.S.
- Died: October 16, 2006 (aged 86); Palm Harbor, Florida, U.S.

Playing career
- 1939–1941: Purdue
- Position: Guard

Coaching career (HC unless noted)
- 1949–1950: Niagara
- 1951: Buffalo (assistant)
- 1954–1958: Purdue (line)
- 1959–1961: Detroit
- 1962–1967: Boston College

Head coaching record
- Overall: 60–44

James Howard Miller (February 1, 1920 – October 16, 2006) was an American football player and coach. A native of Massilon, Ohio, he served as at the head football coach at Niagara University from 1949 to 1950, at the University of Detroit from 1959 to 1961, and at Boston College from 1962 to 1967. Before going to Detroit, he worked for five years as an assistant coach at Purdue University, where he had played as a guard. After an 8–2 season at Boston College in 1962, Miller signed a new three-year contract with a substantial pay hike. On December 7, 1967, after a 4–6 record, he resigned as Eagles head coach.

== Early life and playing career ==
Miller played high school football at Massillon Washington High School under Paul Brown.

== Head coaching record ==
Year	Team	Overall	Conference	Standing	Bowl/playoffs
Niagara Purple Eagles (Western New York Little Three Conference) (1949–1950)
1949	Niagara	2–7	0–2	3rd	
Niagara Purple Eagles (Independent) (1950)
1950	Niagara	6–3			
Niagara:		8–10			
Detroit Titans (Independent) (1959–1961)
1959	Detroit	6–4			
1960	Detroit	7–2			
1961	Detroit	5–4			
Detroit:		18–10			
Boston College Eagles (NCAA University Division independent) (1962–1967)
1962	Boston College	8–2			
1963	Boston College	6–3			
1964	Boston College	6–3			
1965	Boston College	6–4			
1966	Boston College	4–6			
1967	Boston College	4–6			
Boston College:		34–24			
Total:		60–44			
