= 1897 Western Conference football season =

American college football season

- Sport: Football
- Number of teams: 7
- Champion: Wisconsin

Football seasons
- ← 1896 1898 →

1897 Western Conference football standings
| | Conf. | | | | | Overall |
| Team | W | | L | | T | W | | L | | T |
|---|---|---|---|---|---|---|---|---|---|---|
| Wisconsin $ | 3 | – | 0 | – | 0 | 9 | – | 1 | – | 0 |
| Chicago | 3 | – | 1 | – | 0 | 11 | – | 1 | – | 0 |
| Michigan | 2 | – | 1 | – | 0 | 6 | – | 1 | – | 1 |
| Illinois | 1 | – | 1 | – | 0 | 6 | – | 2 | – | 0 |
| Purdue | 1 | – | 2 | – | 0 | 5 | – | 3 | – | 1 |
| Northwestern | 0 | – | 2 | – | 0 | 5 | – | 3 | – | 0 |
| Minnesota | 0 | – | 3 | – | 0 | 4 | – | 4 | – | 0 |
$ – Conference champion

The 1897 Western Conference football season was the second season of college football played by the member schools of the Western Conference (later known as the Big Ten Conference) and was a part of the 1897 college football season.

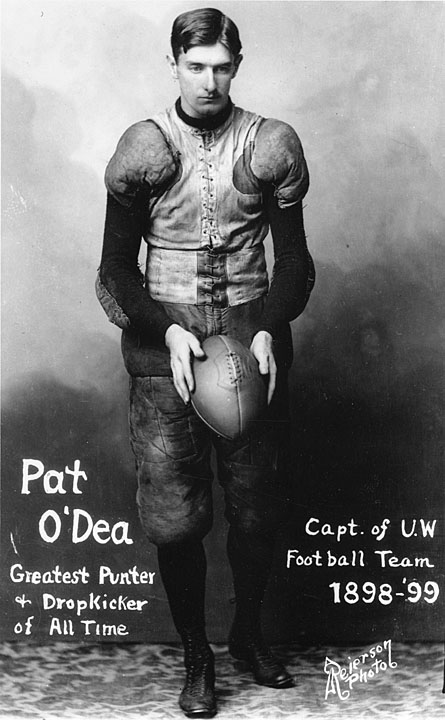
Pat O'Dea of Wisconsin

Wisconsin, coached by Philip King, won its second consecutive conference championship with a record of 9–1 (3–0 against conference opponents). The Badgers' sole loss was against a team of Wisconsin alumni. The Badgers shut out eight opponents and outscored all opponents, 210 to 14. On defense, the team led the conference, allowing an average of 1.4 points per game. Pat O'Dea, an Australian who played fullback and excelled as a kicker, starred for the Badgers.

Chicago, coached by Amos Alonzo Stagg, finished in second place with an 11–1 record. On offense, Chicago led the conference with an average of 26.9 points per game. The most important game of the Western Conference season was played between Chicago and Wisconsin on November 13, 1897, at Marshall Field in Chicago. Wisconsin won the game, 23-8.

Three Western Conference players from the 1897 season were later inducted into the College Football Hall of Fame: O'Dea of Wisconsin; fullback Clarence Herschberger of Chicago; and end Neil Snow of Michigan.

== Season overview ==
=== Results and team statistics ===
| Conf. Rank | Team | Head coach | Overall record | Conf. record | PPG | PAG |
|---|---|---|---|---|---|---|
| 1 | Wisconsin | Philip King | 9–1 | 3–0 | 21.0 | 1.4 |
| 2 | Chicago | Amos A. Stagg | 11–1 | 3–1 | 26.9 | 5.7 |
| 3 | Michigan | Gustave Ferbert | 6–1–1 | 2–1 | 21.0 | 3.9 |
| 4 | Illinois | George Huff | 6–2 | 1–1 | 23.8 | 5.6 |
| 5 | Purdue | William W. Church | 5–3–1 | 1–2 | 11.8 | 12.0 |
| 6 | Northwestern | Jesse Van Doozer | 5–3 | 0–2 | 8.6 | 6.9 |
| 7 | Minnesota | Alexander Jerrems | 4–4 | 0-3 | 14.0 | 9.6 |

Key

PPG = Average of points scored per game
PAG = Average of points allowed per game

=== Regular season ===
Only 10 conference games were played during the 1897 season as follows:

- October 23, 1897: Chicago defeated Northwestern, 21-6, at Chicago
- October 23, 1897: Illinois defeated Purdue, 34-4, at Champaign, Illinois
- October 30, 1897: Chicago defeated Illinois, 18-12, at Champaign, Illinois
- October 30, 1897: Wisconsin defeated Minnesota, 39-0, at Minneapolis.
- November 6, 1897: Michigan defeated Purdue, 34-4, at Ann Arbor, Michigan
- November 13, 1897: Michigan defeated Minnesota, 14-0, at Detroit
- November 13, 1897: Wisconsin defeated Chicago, 23-8, at the Chicago Coliseum
- November 25, 1897: Purdue defeated Minnesota, 6-0, at West Lafayette, Indiana
- November 25, 1897: Chicago defeated Michigan, 21-12, at Chicago
- November 25, 1897: Wisconsin defeated Northwestern, 22-0, at Evanston, Illinois.

Notable non-conference games during the 1897 season included the following:

- October 16, 1897: Michigan defeated Ohio State, 34–0, at Ann Arbor (the first Michigan–Ohio State football rivalry game)
- October 16, 1897: Northwestern lost to Iowa, 12–6, at Evanston, Illinois
- October 23, 1897: Minnesota lost to Iowa Agricultural, 12–10, at Ames, Iowa
- October 30, 1897, Purdue defeated Indiana, 20–6, at West Lafayette, Indiana
- November 6, 1897: Chicago defeated Notre Dame, 34–5, at Chicago
- November 13, 1897: Purdue defeated Missouri, 30–12, at West Lafayette
- November 20, 1897: Illinois lost to Carlisle, 23–6, at Chicago

=== Bowl games ===
No bowl games were played during the 1897 season.

== Awards and honors ==
=== All-Western players ===
An All-Western team was selected by The Northwestern, consisting of the following players:

- Neil Snow, end, Michigan
- James M. Sheldon, end, Chicago
- Arthur Hale Curtis, tackle, Wisconsin
- Jonathan E. Webb, tackle, Chicago
- Richard France, guard, Michigan
- C. Rogers, guard, Wisconsin
- Roy Chamberlain, center, Wisconsin
- Walter S. Kennedy, quarterback, Chicago
- Ralph C. Hamill, halfback, Chicago
- John McLean, halfback, Michigan
- Pat O'Dea, fullback, Wisconsin (NW)

=== All-Americans ===
No Western Conference players were selected for the 1897 College Football All-America Team.
