= 1897 Michigan Wolverines football team =

American college football season

1897 Michigan Wolverines football
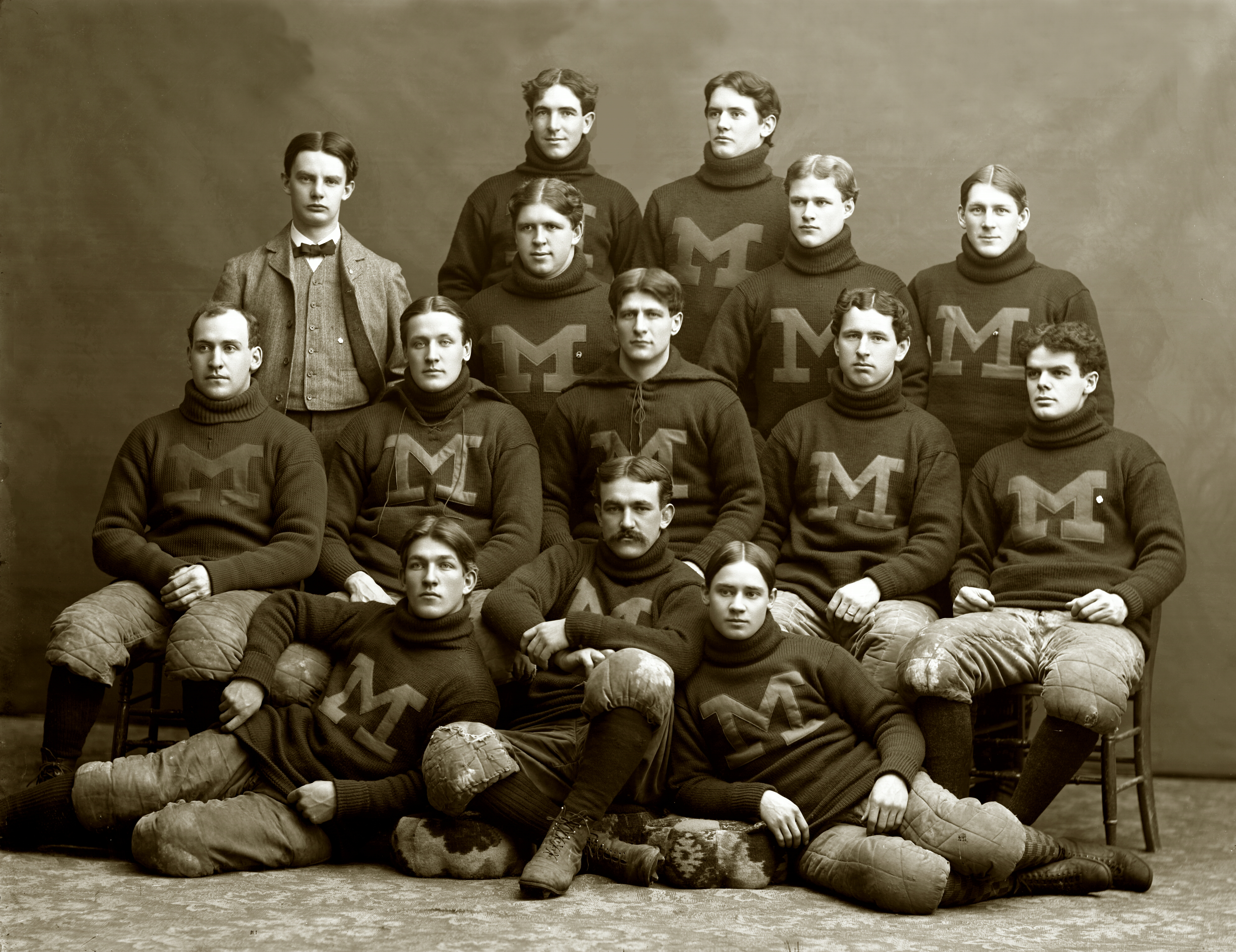
- Conference: Western Conference
- Record: 6–1–1 (2–1 Western)
- Head coach: Gustave Ferbert (1st season)
- Captain: James R. Hogg
- Home stadium: Regents Field

1897 Western Conference football standings
	Conf.					Overall
Team	W		L		T	W		L		T
Wisconsin $	3	–	0	–	0	9	–	1	–	0
Chicago	3	–	1	–	0	11	–	1	–	0
Michigan	2	–	1	–	0	6	–	1	–	1
Illinois	1	–	1	–	0	6	–	2	–	0
Purdue	1	–	2	–	0	5	–	3	–	1
Northwestern	0	–	2	–	0	5	–	3	–	0
Minnesota	0	–	3	–	0	4	–	4	–	0
$ – Conference champion

The 1897 Michigan Wolverines football team was an American football team that represented the University of Michigan in the 1897 Western Conference football season. In its first season under head coach Gustave Ferbert, the team compiled a 6–1–1 record (2–1 against conference opponents), finished third in the Western Conference, and outscored opponents by a total of 166 to 31.

The team suffered its first setback with a scoreless tie against Ohio Wesleyan in the second game of the season. The season also featured the first game between Michigan and Ohio State, with Michigan winning the game by a score of 34 to 0. Michigan won its first two Western Conference games against Purdue (34–4) and Minnesota (14–0), but lost the final game of the season to Amos Alonzo Stagg's Chicago Maroons by a score of 21 to 12.

The team captain was halfback James R. Hogg. Hogg also led the team in scoring with 56 points on six touchdowns (four points each) and 16 goals from touchdown (two points each).

== Schedule ==
Date	Opponent	Site	Result	Attendance
October 2	Michigan State Normal*	Regents Field; Ann Arbor, MI	W 24–0	1,200
October 9	Ohio Wesleyan*	Regents Field; Ann Arbor, MI	T 0–0	
October 16	Ohio State*	Regents Field; Ann Arbor, MI (rivalry)	W 34–0	
October 23	Oberlin*	Regents Field; Ann Arbor, MI	W 16–6	
October 30	Michigan alumni (exhibition)*^{†}	Regents Field; Ann Arbor, MI	L 0–15	
November 6	Purdue	Regents Field; Ann Arbor, MI	W 34–4	
November 13	vs. Minnesota	Detroit Athletic Club Field; Detroit, MI (rivalry)	W 14–0	4,000
November 20	Wittenberg*	Regents Field; Ann Arbor, MI	W 32–0	
November 25	at Chicago	Chicago Coliseum; Chicago, IL (rivalry)	L 12–21	12,000
*Non-conference game; ^{†}Homecoming

== Season summary ==
=== Pre-season ===
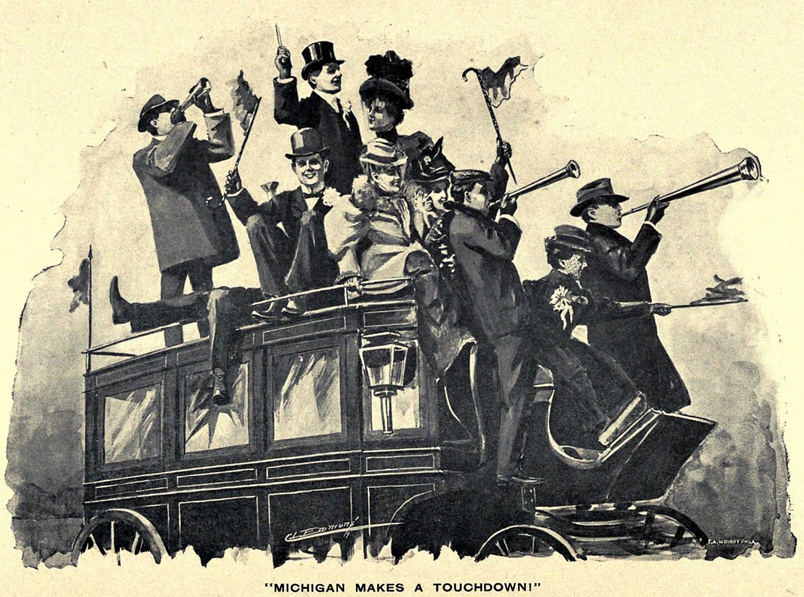
"Michigan Makes A Touchdown"

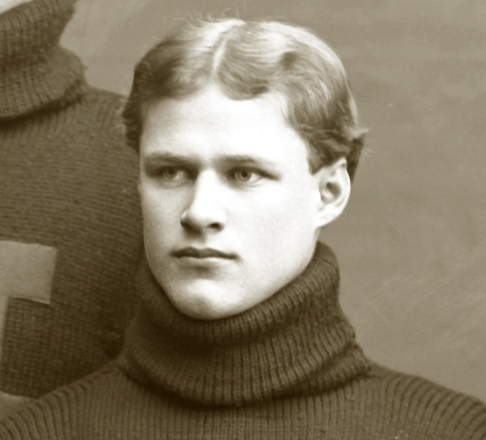
Halfback Hazen Pingree was the son of Michigan Governor Hazen S. Pingree.

After losing the final game of the 1896 season due to the kicking of the University of Chicago's Clarence Herschberger, the Michigan football team began practice early in 1897, gathering in late August. The team announced that, as a direct result of the 1896 loss to Chicago, a "radical change" was being made in the method of play. Michigan promised to produce an improved kicking game, with more hard work being dedicated to kicking than any other part the game.

The expectations for the 1897 team were low. Michigan had lost most of the players from the 1895 championship team. One eastern newspaper described the talent level in Ann Arbor as follows: "The University of Michigan football team of '97, as compared with Michigan teams of tho past few years, is decidedly weak and uncertain. It is not as good by any means as the eleven of last fall. It is not in the same class with the champion eleven of '95. What it lacks is first, weight, second, experience, and third, 'ginger.' There are other lacks as well, but those three are most noticeable."

Adding to the difficulties, Michigan's team captain, J.B. Wombacher, contracted typhoid fever and was unable to report to the university in September. Wombacher had played every game at center for Michigan in 1896. Shortly before his illness, The World of New York had published a football preview feature in which Wombacher had been touted as the key to Michigan's success: "The man who will captain the Unlversity of Michigan eleven is a big, strapping fellow, who was forced into the game by his classmates because of his size and ability to get over the ground. His name is John B. Wombacher, and he hails from Peoria, Ill. He plays centre rush and is something terrific." Wombacher was unable to play in 1897, remaining at his parents' home in Peoria to recuperate from the illness. Halfback, James R. Hogg, was elected to replace Wombacher as the 1897 team captain.

Another key Michigan player was injured before the season began. In late September 1897, Michigan end, Clayton Teetzel, fell during a practice session and "bit off half of his tongue," and was compelled "to live on milk for a week."

=== Game 1: Michigan State Normal ===
Michigan State Normal at Michigan

Team	1	2	Total
Michigan State Normal	0	0	0
• Michigan	6	18	24

- Date: October 2
- Location: Regents Field, Ann Arbor, MI
- Game attendance: 1,200

On October 2, 1897, Michigan defeated Michigan State Normal (later renamed Eastern Michigan University) by a 24–0 score before 1,200 spectators at Regents Field in Ann Arbor. Michigan scored four touchdowns (four points each) and four goals from touchdown (two points each). Left tackle Charles Juttner scored the first touchdown on a five-yard run after five minutes of play in the first half, and right halfback James Hogg kicked the goal for a 6–0 lead at halftime. Three touchdowns followed in the second half, two by Hogg and one by left halfback James R. Henry. Hogg kicked all four goals from touchdown. The game was played in 15-minute halves.

=== Game 2: Ohio Wesleyan ===
Ohio Wesleyan at Michigan

Team	1	2	Total
Ohio Wesleyan	0	0	0
Michigan	0	0	0

- Date: October 9
- Location: Regents Field, Ann Arbor, MI

On October 9, 1897, Michigan and Ohio Wesleyan played to a scoreless tie at Regents Field in Ann Arbor. Michigan played many substitutes in the game. Ohio Wesleyan was led by head coach Fielding H. Yost, who also started the game at right tackle and later moved to left halfback. The U. of M. Daily accused Yost of employing "several 'ringers'" on his squad. The newspaper also criticized the rough tactics, including "hair pulling, choking and bruising," of Yost's squad and noted: "The visitors made good an assertion made the night before to the effect that they would do anything to win, and continually played off-side, slugged and made foul tackles, while incompetent officials stood around in the role of spectators." Yost led his 1897 team to a 7–1–1 record, including a victory over Ohio State.

=== Game 3: Ohio State ===
Ohio State at Michigan

Team	1	2	Total
Ohio State	0	0	0
• Michigan	34	0	34

- Date: October 16
- Location: Regents Field, Ann Arbor, MI

On October 16, 1897, Michigan defeated Ohio State by a 34–0 score at Regents Field in Ann Arbor. The game was the first between the schools and marked the beginning of the Michigan–Ohio State football rivalry.

Michigan scored six touchdowns, all in the first half, including three by G. D. Stuart (including a 26-yard run) and one each by Frederic Hannan (10-yard run), James Hogg, and Hazen Pingree Jr. Hogg kicked five goals from touchdown. Left guard William Caley with opening "holes of the biggest kind" and with making blocks to enable the backs to make long runs. In the second half, Michigan played "for the most part a kicking game," forcing Ohio State to move the length of the field to score. According to one account, the play in the second half "assumed the form of a practice game," as players were substituted and kicking and defense were the feature for the rest of the game. The game was played in halves of 20 and 15 minutes.

Michigan's starting lineup for the first game against Ohio State was Clayton Teetzel (left end), Herbert Lehr (left tackle), Muir Snow (left guard), Fred Savage (center), William Caley (right guard), Charles Juttner (right tackle), John W. F. Bennett (right end), William Wilson Talcott (quarterback), G. D. Stuart (left halfback), James Hogg (right halfback), and Frederic Hannan (fullback). Michigan substitutes appearing in the game were Norwood Ayers (left end), William Baker (right tackle), Hazen Pingree Jr. (left halfback), and John McLean (left halfback).

=== Game 4: Oberlin ===
Oberlin at Michigan

Team	1	2	Total
Oberlin	6	0	6
• Michigan	0	16	16

- Date: October 23
- Location: Regents Field, Ann Arbor, MI

On October 23, 1897, Michigan won by a 16–6 score over the football team from Oberlin College. The game was played in halves of 25 and 20 minutes at Regents Field in Ann Arbor. Oberlin scored first off a blocked punt. Less than a minute into the game, a poor snap from Cunningham to Hannan was fumbled, and by the time Hannan recovered, his punt went into the line and was blocked. The ball bounced into the hands of Beatty of Oberlin who ran to a touchdown through a clear field. The first half ended with Oberlin leading, 6–0.

Left guard William Caley starred in the second half for Michigan, scoring three touchdowns, and Hogg kicked two goals from touchdown. The last touchdown was scored in darkness. The U. of M. Daily described Caley's effort: "Caley outdid all his best prior efforts. He was a tower of strength. Not only did he completely out-play his opponent, but he permitted no gains to be made through him, and on the guard back plays made openings of all sizes and bucked for sure gains."

Oberlin had been favored, and when the game ended in a Michigan victory, a great celebration ensued. "The demonstration at the end of the game is without parallel on Regents' Field. The yelling was deafening, and hats went up in the air by the hundreds. Every Michigan player was raised into the air upon the shoulders of howling students and cheered till exhaustion called a halt. A procession was quickly formed and headed by the band, the team was carried to the campus." Michigan was the only team to defeat the 1897 Oberlin team, which shut out both Purdue (22–0) and Ohio State (44–0).

One newspaper account credited the win to the famous "Michigan brace": "[T]he famous 'Michigan brace' took place a series of brilliant runs being made in the last fifteen minutes of play netting 16 points."

=== Game 5: Michigan alumni ===
Michigan alumni at Michigan

Team	1	2	Total
• Michigan alumni	6	9	15
Michigan	0	0	0

- Date: October 30
- Location: Regents Field, Ann Arbor, MI

On October 30, 1897, Michigan lost by a 15–0 score to a Michigan alumni team at Regents Field in Ann Arbor. Thad Farnham and William C. Malley scored touchdowns for the alumni, and John A. Bloomingston kicked a field goal from the 40-yard line and a goal for touchdown. The game was played in 15-minute halves. John Duffy was the referee, and Horace Prettyman was the umpire. Approximately 400 alumni attended the game, marching from the old chapel to Regents Field.

The alumni team was made up of Farnham (left end), Malley (left tackle), Archie Stevenson (left guard), Edwin Denby (center), Frederick W. Henninger (right guard), Allen Steckle (right tackle), Loomis Hutchinson and George Greenleaf (right end), James Baird (quarterback), Gustave Ferbert and George Jewett (left halfback), Horace Dyer and Raynor Freund (right halfback), and Bloomingston (fullback).

=== Game 6: Purdue ===
Purdue at Michigan

Team	1	2	Total
Purdue	4	0	4
• Michigan	12	22	34

- Date: November 6
- Location: Regents Field, Ann Arbor, MI

On November 6, 1897, Michigan defeated Purdue by a 34–4 score at Regents Field in Ann Arbor. Right halfback James Hogg scored Michigan's first touchdown and also kicked the goal from touchdown; Michigan led, 6–0, at the 14:23 mark. Purdue scored next on a run by A. F. Alward, and Michigan's lead was cut to 6–4. A short time later, Frederic Hannan was pushed over the goal line for a touchdown, and Hogg again kicked the goal to extend Michigan's lead to 12–4 at halftime. In the second half, Hogg ran for his second touchdown after four minutes and 10 seconds had been played. The goal was kicked, and Michigan led, 18–4. Hannan scored next, and with the kick for goal, Michigan's lead was extended to 24–4. Pingree scored Michigan's fifth touchdown, and Hogg kicked the goal, extending the lead further to 30–4. Felver scored Michigan's sixth and final touchdown, but the goal was not made. With one minute remaining in the game, the game was called due to darkness.

After the game, Professor Thomas Trueblood conducted a well-attended and enjoyable performance of various character roles from Julius Caesar.

=== Game 7: Minnesota ===
Minnesota vs. Michigan

Team	1	2	Total
Minnesota	0	0	0
• Michigan	8	6	14

- Date: November 13
- Location: Regents Field, Ann Arbor, MI

On November 13, 1897, Michigan defeated Minnesota by a 14–0 score. The game was played in 35-minute halves before almost 4,000 spectators at the Detroit Athletic Club's field in Detroit. The crowd included 1,200 Michigan students who arrived on special trains from Ann Arbor. It was Michigan's third consecutive victory over Minnesota.

The game began at 2:42 p.m. and lasted for two hours and 18 minutes. It remained scoreless for the first 27 minutes. At that point, Michigan's left guard William Caley ran one yard for a touchdown, but James Hogg missed the kick for goal; Michigan led, 4–0. Hogg scored Michigan's second touchdown on a two-yard run but again missed the kick for goal; Michigan led, 8–0, at halftime. In the second half, neither team scored for 33 minutes, though Clayton Teetzel had a 65-yard touchdown run that was negated by holding penalty against Minnesota. Then, with approximately two minutes remaining, Leo J. Keena scored a touchdown on a four-yard run, and Hogg kicked the goal to extend Michigan's lead to 14–0.

Minnesota's fullback and punter, Loomis, suffered a broken ankle early in the first half. The game was largely a kicking contest, with each team punting the ball back and forth. One newspaper account reported that, due to the frequency of the punts, the ball was "in the air nearly half the time." After the game, the Minnesota players opined that Michigan was "not in the same class" with Wisconsin, which had defeated Minnesota the previous week by a score of 39–0.

After the game, there was a parade down Woodward Avenue to the Russell House. The Detroit Free Press described the celebration: "Canes were flourished; hats were thrown in air ...; pretty girls waved ribbons and flags of dual color, yellow and blue; trumpets sounded, bugles blew; horns screeched; horses neighed and pawed the ground, wondering, no doubt, what all this bother was about. Beneath the shouts and cries, like a deep bass accompaniment to the wonderful composition of sounds ran the low muttering of the multitude and the tramping of many feet. Michigan had won the contest and the jubilant feelings of her followers were but finding an outlet in the rhythmical yells, the lightsome sounding of tins and brasses, the short, hoarse cheers from the tired and husky throats that had already shouted all too long."

=== Game 8: Wittenberg ===
Wittenberg at Michigan

Team	1	2	Total
Wittenberg	0	0	0
• Michigan	16	16	32

- Date: November 20
- Location: Regents Field, Ann Arbor, MI

On November 20, 1897, Michigan played the team from Wittenberg College in Springfield, Ohio, prevailing by a 32–0 score at Regents Field in Ann Arbor. None of Michigan's regular players appeared in the game, as the coaches did not want to risk injuries before the Chicago game set to be played five days later. The reserves scored four touchdowns in the first half, but made no kicks for goal, and led 16–0 at halftime. In the second half, they scored on two field goals, one touchdown, and a goal from touchdown. Thomas Marks scored two of the touchdowns, and Joseph Thomas, Charles Juttner, Don Pagelson, and Carl Kennedy scored one each. Burt Hodgman kicked the field goals. The game was played in 15-minute halves. Former Michigan star Frederick W. Henninger attended the game and planned to stay the week to assist in coaching for the Chicago game. The game attracted the smallest crowd of the year.

=== Game 9: Chicago ===
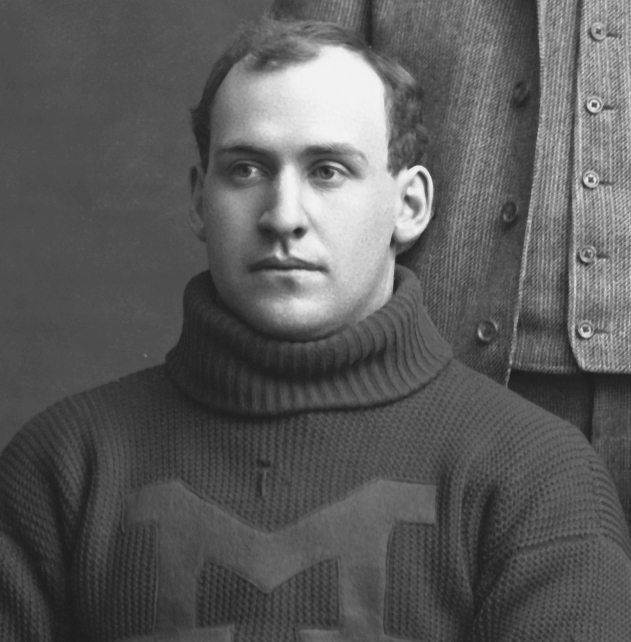
Tackle William Baker returned a fumble 55 yards for a touchdown on Thanksgiving 1897.

Michigan closed the 1897 season with its traditional Thanksgiving Day game in Chicago against the Chicago Maroons. The game was played in front of a crowd of 12,000 spectators at the Chicago Coliseum. Chicago scored first on a 35-yard run by Gardner. Chicago's fullback, Clarence Herschberger, kicked the goal after touchdown to give the Maroons a 6 to 0 lead. Herschberger next added a drop kick field goal from the 17-yard line to increase Chicago's lead to 11 to 0 at the end of the first half. In the second half, Clayton Teetzel, playing at left end, scored a touchdown for Michigan on a 15-yard run through Chicago's left tackle and end. Teetzel added the goal after touchdown to make the score 11 to 6. Herschberger added two more field goals to increase Chicago's lead to 21 to 6. Michigan's scored a second touchdown when Michigan's fullback, Frederick Hannan, kicked the ball for Michigan from its own 25-yard line. The ball touched a Chicago player, and Michigan tackle, William F. Baker, grabbed the ball and ran 55 yards for a touchdown. Teetzel kicked the goal from touchdown resulting in a final score of 21 to 12. Although Michigan scored two touchdowns to Chicago's one touchdown, field goals were worth five points in 1897, and Herschberger's three field goals were worth 15 points.

== Personnel ==
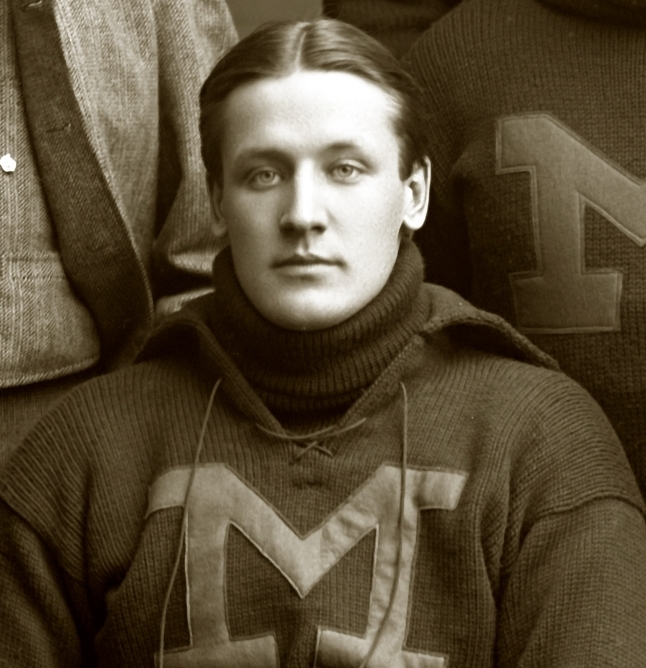
End John Bennett from Jackson, Michigan

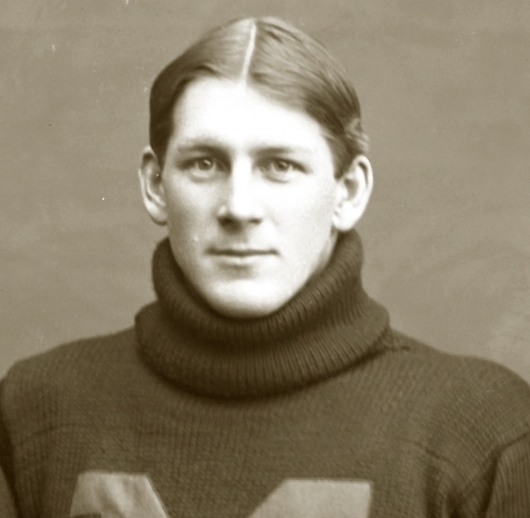
End Clayton Teetzel from Chicago

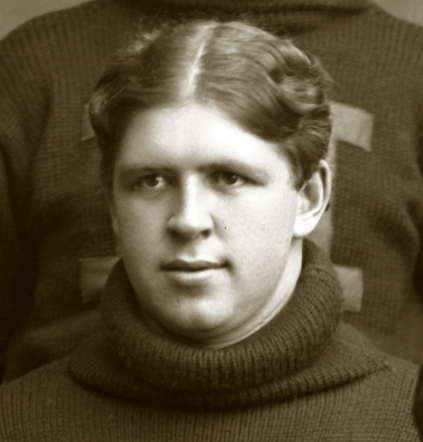
Tackle R.S. Lockwood from Kankakee, Illinois

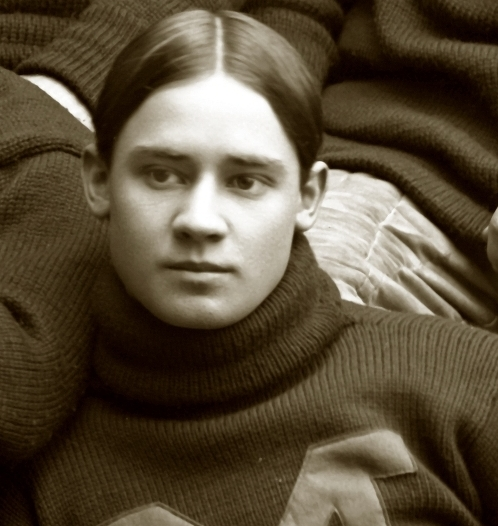
Quarterback Howard Felver from Batavia, Illinois

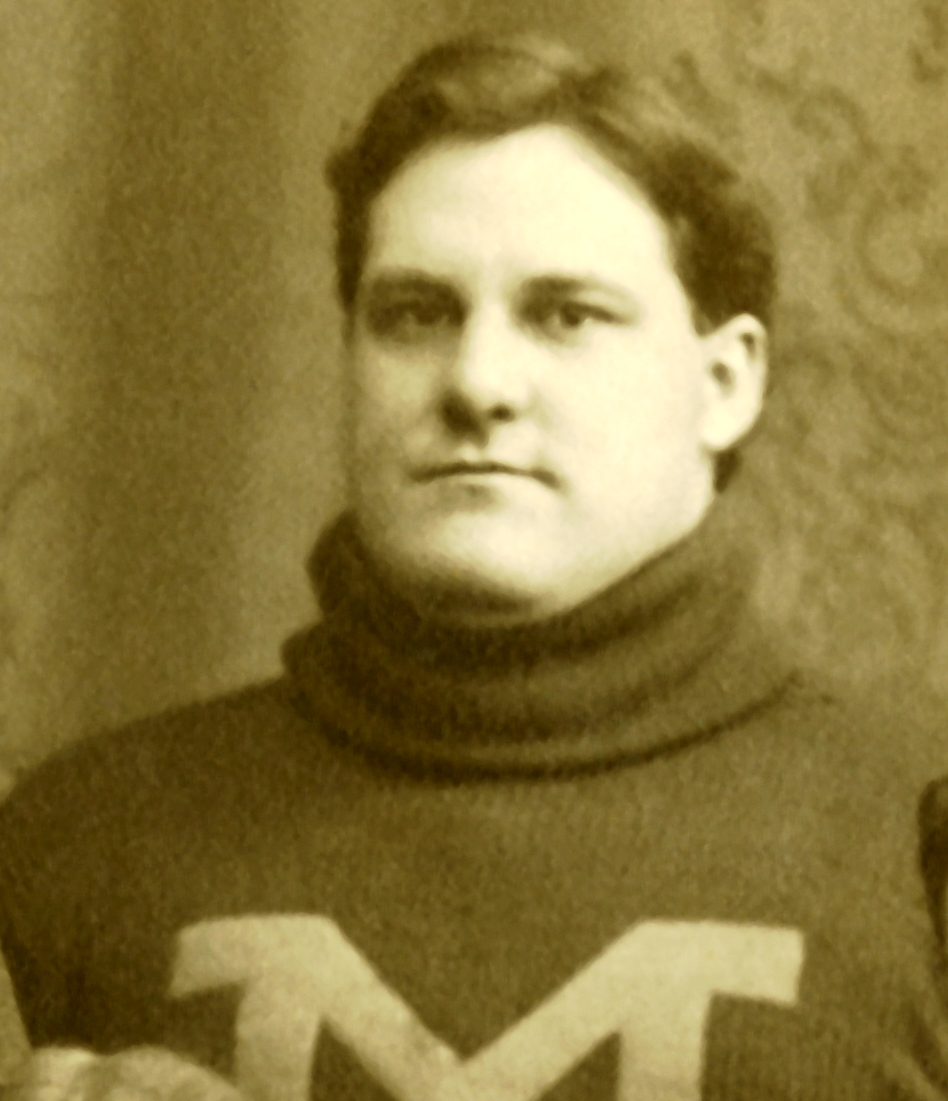
All-American center William Cunningham from Grove City, Pennsylvania

=== Letter winners ===
- Norwood B. Ayers, Colorado Springs, Colorado - end
- William P. Baker, Woodville, Ohio - tackle
- Clifford A. Barabee, Negaunee, Michigan - halfback
- John W. F. Bennett, Jackson, Michigan - end
- William Caley, Boulder, Colorado (Univ. of Colorado) - guard
- William Cunningham, Grove City, Pennsylvania - center
- John E. Egan, Excello, Ohio = guard
- Howard Felver, Batavia, Illinois - quarterback
- Frederic C. Hannan, Chicago, Illinois - fullback
- James R. Hogg, Knoxville, Tennessee (St. Albans Military Academy) - halfback
- Charles F. Juttner, Powers, Michigan - tackle
- Leo J. Keena - fullback
- Herbert E. Lehr, Marine, Illinois - guard
- R.S. Lockwood, Kankakee, Illinois (Shattuck Military Academy) - tackle
- Hazen S. Pingree Jr., Detroit, Michigan - halfback
- J. De Forest Richards - quarterback
- Muir B. Snow, Detroit, Michigan - guard
- Allen Steckle, Freeport, Michigan - tackle
- George D. "Honey" Stuart - halfback
- Clayton Teetzel, Chicago, Illinois - end

=== Reserves ===
- Allen - guard
- Anderson - tackle
- James Chivis Armstrong - quarterback
- Walter G. Bain - halfback
- Arthur Ganschow - end
- Edwin H. Gordon - halfback
- James R. Henry - halfback
- Burt B. Hodgman - fullback
- W.D. Kasper - captain and quarterback of the reserve squad
- Carl Sears Kennedy - fullback
- Thomas R. Marks - tackle
- John F. McLean - halfback
- Moore - guard
- Don F. Pagelson - halfback
- James Blakely Pell - end
- Ard E. Richardson - end
- Fred N. Savage - center
- James Shirley Symons - tackle
- William Wilson Talcott, Chicago, Illinois (reserve) - quarterback
- Joseph Thomas - halfback
- Walter E. Welz - guard
- Alanson Weeks - fullback

=== Coaching staff ===
- Coach: Gustave Ferbert
- Trainer: Tom Cox
- Assistant coaches: James Baird, John R. Duffy, Ignatius M. Duffy, Thaddeus S. Farnham, Raynor S. Freund, Frederick W. Henninger, William C. Malley, Giovanni R. Villa, Archibald Stevenson
- Managers: Ward W. Hughes, Henry T. Heald
