= 1897 Wisconsin Badgers football team =

American college football season

1897 Wisconsin Badgers football

Western Conference champion
- Conference: Western Conference
- Record: 9–1 (3–0 Western)
- Head coach: Philip King (2nd season)
- Captain: Jerry Riordan
- Home stadium: Randall Field

1897 Western Conference football standings
	Conf.					Overall
Team	W		L		T	W		L		T
Wisconsin $	3	–	0	–	0	9	–	1	–	0
Chicago	3	–	1	–	0	11	–	1	–	0
Michigan	2	–	1	–	0	6	–	1	–	1
Illinois	1	–	1	–	0	6	–	2	–	0
Purdue	1	–	2	–	0	5	–	3	–	1
Northwestern	0	–	2	–	0	5	–	3	–	0
Minnesota	0	–	3	–	0	4	–	4	–	0
$ – Conference champion

The 1897 Wisconsin Badgers football team was an American football team that represented the University of Wisconsin as a member of the Western Conference during the 1897 Western Conference football season. In their second year under head coach Philip King, the Badgers compiled a 9–1 record (3–0 in conference games), won the Western Conference championship for the second consecutive season, shut out eight of ten opponents, and outscored all opponents by a total of 210 to 14.

The team's captain was Jerry Riordan. The team played its home games at Randall Field in Madison, Wisconsin.

== Schedule ==
Date	Opponent	Site	Result	Source
October 2	Lake Forest*	Randall Field; Madison, WI	W 30–0	
October 6	Madison High School*	Randall Field; Madison, WI	W 8–0	
October 9	Rush Medical*	Randall Field; Madison, WI	W 28–0	
October 13	Platteville Normal*	Randall Field; Madison, WI	W 28–0	
October 23	Madison High School*	Randall Field; Madison, WI	W 29–0	
October 30	at Minnesota	Athletic Park; Minneapolis, MN (rivalry)	W 24–0	
November 6	Beloit*	Randall Field; Madison, WI	W 11–0	
November 13	at Chicago	Marshall Field; Chicago, IL	W 23–8	
November 20	Wisconsin Alumni*	Randall Field; Madison, WI	L 0–6	
November 25	at Northwestern	Sheppard Field; Evanston, IL	W 22–0	
*Non-conference game
