= 1900 Michigan State Normal Normalites football team =

American college football season

1900 Michigan State Normal Normalites football
- Conference: Michigan Intercollegiate Athletic Association
- Record: 0–4 (0–1 MIAA)
- Head coach: Clayton Teetzel (1st season)
- Captain: Austin F. Jones

The 1900 Michigan State Normal Normalites football team represented Michigan State Normal College (later renamed Eastern Michigan University) during the 1900 college football season. The team compiled a record of 0–4, failed to score a point, and was outscored by a combined total of 81 to 0. Austin F. Jones was the team captain.

In early September 1900, Clayton Teetzel was hired as Michigan State Normal's director of athletics and football coach. Teetzel was 24 years old at the time of his hiring; he had played football for the University of Michigan from 1897 to 1899 before graduating with a law degree in 1900.

By October 2, 1900, the enrollment at Michigan State Normal had reached 750 students. Another 200 or 300 students were expected by the end of the week. The school's prominence in the ranks of teaching school's was advanced by the Journal of Pedagogy's 1900 move of its headquarters from Syracuse, New York, to Ypsilanti.

== Schedule ==
Date	Opponent	Site	Result	Source
October 20	Michigan Military Academy*	Ypsilanti, MI	L 0–17	
October 27	Michigan reserves*	Ypsilanti, MI	L 0–41	
November 3	Detroit Athletic Club reserves*	Ypsilanti, MI	L 0–11	
November 10	at Kalamazoo	Kalamazoo, MI	L 0–12	
*Non-conference game
