= Clayton Teetzel =

American sportsman and athletic coach (1876–1948)

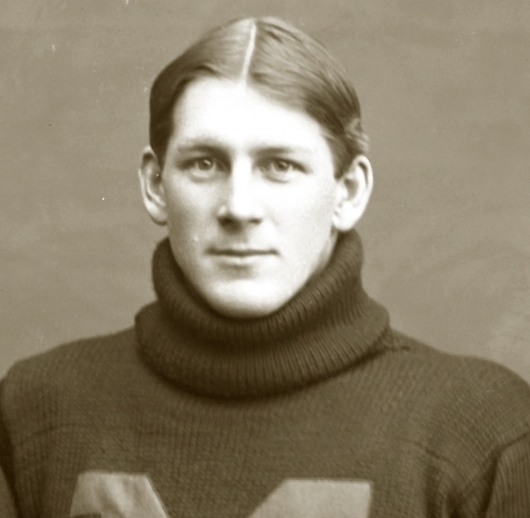

Biographical details
- Born: August 27, 1876; Jackson, Michigan, U.S.
- Died: July 29, 1948 (aged 71); South Haven, Michigan, U.S.

Playing career

Football
- 1897–1899: Michigan
- Positions: Halfback, end

Coaching career (HC unless noted)

Football
- 1900–1902: Michigan State Normal
- 1903–1904: Benton Harbor HS (MI)
- 1909–1915: Utah Agricultural

Basketball
- 1901–1903: Michigan State Normal
- 1906–1908: BYU
- 1908–1914: Utah Agricultural

Head coaching record
- Overall: 30–32–3 (college football)

Clayton Tryon Teetzel (August 27, 1876 – July 29, 1948) was an American sportsman and athletic coach. He played American football and competed in track for the University of Michigan from 1897 to 1899 and later coached football, basketball and track at Michigan State Normal College (now Eastern Michigan University), Benton Harbor High School, Brigham Young University, and Utah State University.

== Early years ==
Teetzel was born in Michigan in 1876. His father, William H. Teetzel, was a native of Canada who worked as a traveling salesman. His mother, Carrie Teetzel, was a native of Michigan. At the time of the 1880 United States census, Teetzel was living with his parents and older brother, William H. Teetzel, in Indianapolis, Indiana. The family later moved to Chicago where the father worked as a salesman. Teetzel became a track star at Englewood High School in 1894. In 1895, Teetzel transferred to the Michigan Military Academy in Orchard Lake, Michigan, but returned to Englewood High School for his senior year in 1896. During his high school career, he won Illinois state high school championships in the 440-yard dash and 880-yard run, and finished in the top three in the 220-yard dash and the mile run. Teetzel also played football for Englewood. After leading Englewood to a 28–6 victory over rival Lake View, a Chicago newspaper wrote

The playing of Teetzel was the feature of the game. The Lake View men seemed unable to stop him when he had the ball and hit their line for repeated gains. At one time he broke through the line of the opposing team and carried the ball 100 yards for a touchdown and made many runs of from thirty to forty yards.

The Englewood school newspaper lauded his contributions as follows

Clayton Teetzel, at Right half back, deserves considerable more space than we can allot to him. He is as good a player as Englewood High School has ever turned out, and is capable of playing on almost any college team in the country. A swift runner, dodger and exceedingly difficult to tackle, he hits the line with almost irresistible force. All the praise and flattery that he gets fails to make him conceited, which amount to a virtue in his case. He probably has carried the oval more yards than any other high school player in the country this year.

== University of Michigan ==
After graduating from high school, Teetzel enrolled at the University of Michigan where he played football and also ran for the track team. Teetzel played end for the 1897 Michigan Wolverines football team that compiled a record of 6–1–1 and outscored its opponents by a combined score of 168 to 31. In the Wolverines' season-ending loss to Chicago in 1897, Teetzel scored Michigan's first touchdown on a long run through left tackle (and kicked the goal after touchdown) and was cited as one of two Michigan players who had outplayed his adversary

Teetzel did splendid work and if anything had a little better of the argument with Hamill. Outside of Teetzel and Quarterback Howard Felver, however, the Chicago players outplayed their opponents.

Teetzel also played at the end position for the undefeated 1898 Michigan Wolverines football team that won the university's first Western Conference championship. In 1899, Teetzel moved to the halfback position for the Wolverines team that compiled an 8–2 record and outscored opponents 176 to 43.

Teetzel graduated from the University of Michigan Law School with an LL.B. degree in 1900.

== Michigan State Normal College ==
Teetzel served as the football coach at Michigan State Normal College, now Eastern Michigan University, from 1900 through 1902, compiling a 6–14–1 record. He was the first person to coach at MSNC for longer than one year.

== Benton Harbor High School ==
He served as the football coach at Benton Harbor High School from 1903 to 1904. In 2002, a book titled "The Way We Played the Game: A True Story of One Team and the Dawning of American Football," was published. The book told the story of Benton Harbor High School's 1903 football team and American football in its nascent form. Coach Teetzel is depicted in the book as a disciplined strategist who teaches his players a "thinking man's game." Shortly after Teetzel left Benton Harbor in 1905 to take a position with Brigham Young University, a Benton Harbor newspaper paid tribute to Teetzel's contributions and reported on an accident suffered by Teetzel

Coach Teetzel, the man who made the Benton Harbor football team famous the past two years and gave Benton Harbor a reputation that she could have secured in no other way met with the most serious accident of his life. While doing some fancy stunts in the gymnasium in the Brighasn Young University at Provo, Utah, on March 6, he fell and broke his leg four inches above the ankle. Teetzel is now instructor in athletics at the Brigham Young university.

== BYU ==
In early 1905, Teetzel, a non-Mormon, was hired to supervise the extracurricular sports program at Brigham Young University (BYU). Shortly afterwards, the university began offering its first physical education classes, with "free-arm movements and dumb-bell drills" for men and, for female students, "fancy marching" and "wand drills." In April 1905, Teetzel led Brigham Young's track team in its first dual meet in six years against the University of Utah. It was reported in the local press that Teetzel, "one of the greatest sprinters that ever left Michigan," had taught the Brigham Young men his stride.

During the fall of 1905, Teetzel was granted a leave to return to Michigan to coach the Benton Harbor football team. (BYU did not have a football team until the 1920s.) After coaching Benton Harbor to an undefeated season, he returned to Provo where BYU's athletes were reportedly pleased to have him back.

Teetzel met with his greatest success at Brigham Young as the coach of the university's basketball team. He coached the BYU basketball team to an 11–1 record in the 1905–06 season and followed with records of 7–3 and 4–2 in the 1906–07 and 1907–08 seasons.

After Teetzel announced his resignation, Teetzel was honored at a dinner at which the athletic association presented him with a gold stop watch and the faculty presented him with "an autograph album of Provo views."

== Utah State ==
In May 1908, Teetzel was hired as coach at Utah State Agricultural College, at Logan, Utah, replacing Coach Fred M. Walker. Teetzel's duties at Utah State included coaching the basketball, baseball, football, track, wrestling, swimming and boxing teams. Teetzel recruited athletes from California and elsewhere and developed one of the top track teams in the far west, while also training dozens of men in boxing and wrestling. In his first season as the school's basketball coach, the team compiled a record of 1–11. After three more losing seasons, Teetzel turned the program around. The Utah State basketball team compiled a record of 10–4 in the 1913–14 season under Teetzel. As coach of the Utah State football team, Teetzel compiled the following record:

- 1909: 2–2–1
- 1910: 5–2 (including victories over Idaho St., Montana, and Montana St.)
- 1911: 5–0 (outscoring opponents 164 to 0)
- 1912: 4–2–1
- 1913: 3–3
- 1914: 2–5 (being outscored 56 to 208)
- 1915: 3–4

After seven years as the head of the athletic department at Utah State, Teetzel announced in early 1916 that he was taking an extended vacation trip to California and would return to Logan the latter part of the year. He resigned his coaching responsibilities, leading to reports that he would be replacing Ralph Glaze at the University of Southern California. Teetzel denied the rumors and told the press that he was "through with the coaching game" and wished to go into business. He had received his law degree from Michigan in 1900, passed the Utah bar examination, and indicated he would prefer to practice law. Newspapers in Utah reported at the time: "When Teelzel leaves the college, he leaves with the good will of every student, faculty member and friend of the college. ... Teetzel is well liked all over the state for his true sportsmanship and the way in which be has treated all with whom he has come in contact."

== Family and later years ==
At the time of the 1910 United States census, Teetzel was living in Logan, Utah with his wife, Jessie, and their three children, Henry (age 7), Phillip (age 3), and Carolyn (age 2). In September 1918, Teetzel was living in Chicago, Illinois and working as an advertising solicitor for the Chicago Tribune. At the time of the 1930 United States census, Teetzel was living in Chicago with his wife, Jessie B. Teetzel, and their son, Henry G. Teetzel. His occupation was listed as a solicitor for advertising copy.

In his later years, Teetzel spent his summers in South Haven, Michigan. He died in South Haven in July 1948 at age 71.

== Head coaching record ==
=== College football ===
Year	Team	Overall	Conference	Standing	Bowl/playoffs
Michigan State Normal Normalites (Michigan Intercollegiate Athletic Association) (1900–1902)
1900	Michigan State Normal	2–4	0–1		
1901	Michigan State Normal	3–5	0–3		
1902	Michigan State Normal	1–5–1	0–2		
Michigan State Normal:		6–14–1	0–6		
Utah Agricultural Aggies (Independent) (1909–1913)
1909	Utah Agricultural	2–2–1			
1910	Utah Agricultural	5–2			
1911	Utah Agricultural	5–0			
1912	Utah Agricultural	4–2–1			
1913	Utah Agricultural	3–3			
Utah Agricultural Aggies (Rocky Mountain Conference) (1914–1915)
1914	Utah Agricultural	2–5	1–2	6th	
1915	Utah Agricultural	3–4	0–3	8th	
Utah Agricultural:		24–18–2	0–6		
Total:		30–32–3			
