= 1897 Illinois Fighting Illini football team =

American college football season

1897 Illinois Fighting Illini football
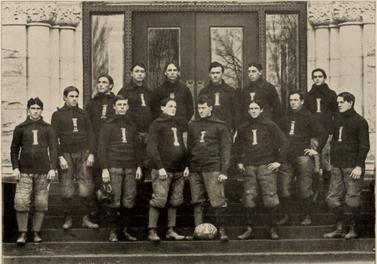
- Conference: Western Conference
- Record: 6–2 (1–1 Western)
- Head coach: George Huff (3rd season)
- Captain: Don Sweney
- Home stadium: Illinois Field

1897 Western Conference football standings
	Conf.					Overall
Team	W		L		T	W		L		T
Wisconsin $	3	–	0	–	0	9	–	1	–	0
Chicago	3	–	1	–	0	11	–	1	–	0
Michigan	2	–	1	–	0	6	–	1	–	1
Illinois	1	–	1	–	0	6	–	2	–	0
Purdue	1	–	2	–	0	5	–	3	–	1
Northwestern	0	–	2	–	0	5	–	3	–	0
Minnesota	0	–	3	–	0	4	–	4	–	0
$ – Conference champion

The 1897 Illinois Fighting Illini football team was an American football team that represented the University of Illinois during the 1897 Western Conference football season. In their third season under head coach George Huff, the Illini compiled a 6–2 record and finished in fourth place in the Western Conference. Tackle Don Sweney was the team captain.

== Schedule ==
Date	Time	Opponent	Site	Result	Attendance	Source
October 2		Eureka*	Illinois Field; Champaign, IL	W 26–0		
October 9		Chicago Physicians and Surgeons*	Illinois Field; Champaign, IL	W 6–0		
October 16		Lake Forest*	Illinois Field; Champaign, IL	W 36–0		
October 23		Purdue	Illinois Field; Champaign, IL (rivalry)	W 34–4		
October 30		Chicago	Illinois Field; Champaign, IL	L 12–18		
November 12		Knox*	Illinois Field; Champaign, IL	W 64–0		
November 20	8:00 p.m.	vs. Carlisle*	Coliseum; Chicago, IL	L 6–23	10,000–12,000	
November 25		at Eureka*	Eureka Field; Eureka, IL	W 6–0		
*Non-conference game

== Roster ==
Official Roster
Beadle, Thomas B. LE; Coffeen, Harry C. RE; Enochs, Claude D. RHB; Fischer, Leon E. LG; Forbes, Stuart F. FB; Johnston, Arthur R. LHB; McLane, E.C. C; Merker, Henry F. RG; Shuler, Hugh M. QB; Sweney, Don LT (captain); Von Oven, Frederick W. RT; Wilmarth, Geo H. QB/E	Substitutes: Adsit, Bertram W. E; Atwood, James R. HB; Branch, James M. T/E/HB; Clinton, Edgar M. HB; Eggleston, J.L. HB; Francis, Frank D. HB; Frazier, E.A. RG; Hall, Arthur R. HB; Jack, R.D. E/T; Jordan, Geo T. HB; King, Wesley E. C/G; Lippincott, C.A. RT; Logan, Harry R. HB; McCormick, Roscoe C. LG; Schacht, Frederick W. RE/LHB; Webb, Otto HB
