= Chicago–Michigan football rivalry =

Sports rivalry

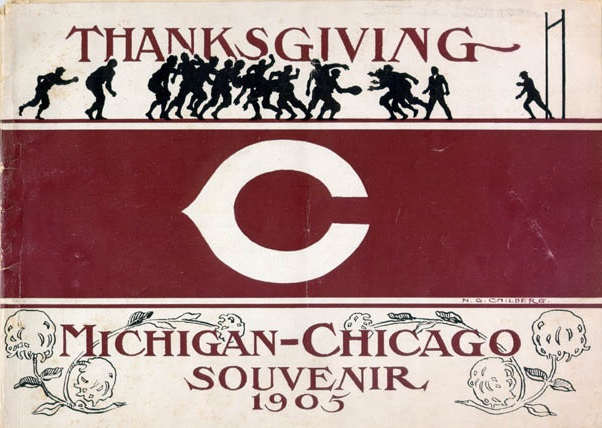
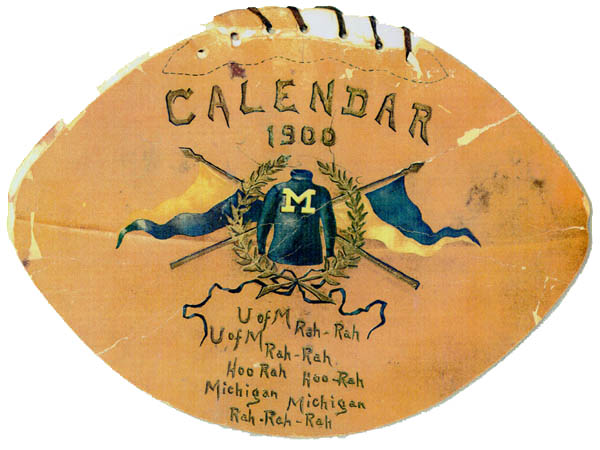
- Chicago Maroons Michigan Wolverines
- First meeting: November 12, 1892; Michigan, 18–10
- Latest meeting: October 21, 1939; Michigan, 85–0
- Next meeting: Series defunct since 1939

Statistics
- Total meetings: 26
- All-time series: Michigan leads, 19–7
- Largest victory: Michigan, 85–0 (1939)
- Longest win streak: Michigan, 6 (1920–1933)
- Current win streak: Michigan, 3 (1937–1939)

Locations of Chicago and Michigan

The Chicago–Michigan football rivalry was an American college football rivalry game played by the Wolverines of the University of Michigan and Maroons of the University of Chicago. From 1892 to 1905, it was the most important game of the season for the two schools, which were the first major football powers in what was then considered the western United States. The rivalry ended after the 1939 season when the University of Chicago dropped out of the Big Ten Conference. The roots of the rivalry date back to 1879 when Michigan played its first intercollegiate football game in Chicago and to a series of matches played between Michigan and the "Chicago University Club" between 1888 and 1891.

== Background ==
=== 1879: First football game in Chicago ===
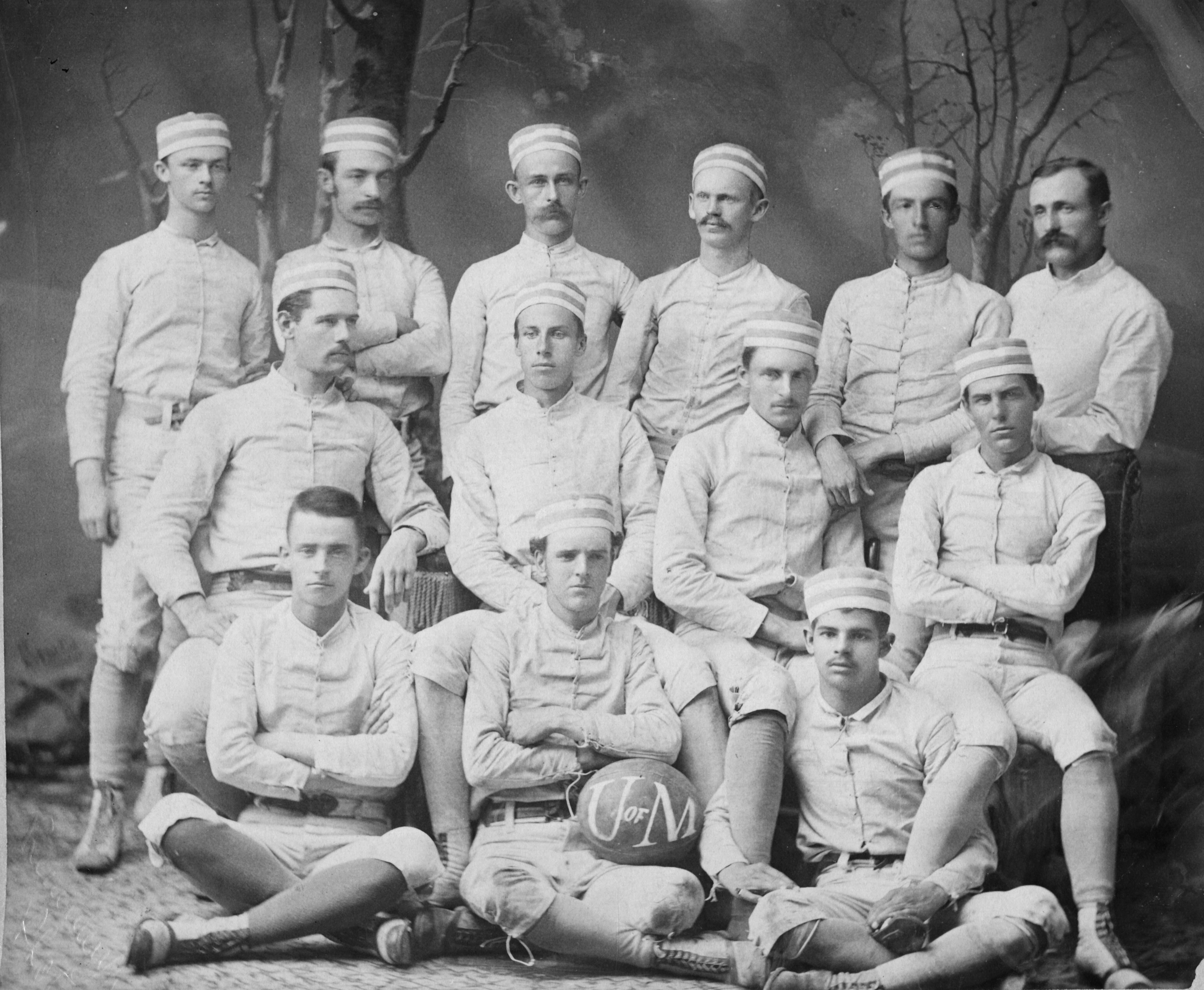
Michigan's 1879 team played the school's first intercollegiate game in Chicago.

The University of Chicago was founded in 1890, but the roots of the Chicago–Michigan football rivalry pre-date that university's founding. The University of Michigan was founded in 1817 and began its football program in the 1870s. Michigan's first intercollegiate game was played in Chicago on May 30, 1879. That first game, a 1–0 victory over the "Purple Stockings" from Racine College, was played at the Union Base-Ball Grounds in Lakefront Park (now part of Grant Park). The Chicago Daily Tribune called it "the first rugby-football game to be played west of the Alleghenies."

=== 1887: Thanksgiving Day game in Chicago ===
The Michigan football team next returned to Chicago in November 1887. On the way to Chicago, the Michigan team stopped in Indiana where they participated in the first match ever played by a Notre Dame football team. Michigan had planned on a Thanksgiving Day game against Northwestern, but the game could not be arranged. Instead, a match against the Harvard school team was played on a wet and muddy field at the grounds of the Wanderer Cricket Club (referred to in some reports as Wanderers' park) at 37th Street and Indiana Avenue. The game was called with Michigan leading 26 to 0.

=== 1888: Chicago University Club 26, Michigan 4 ===
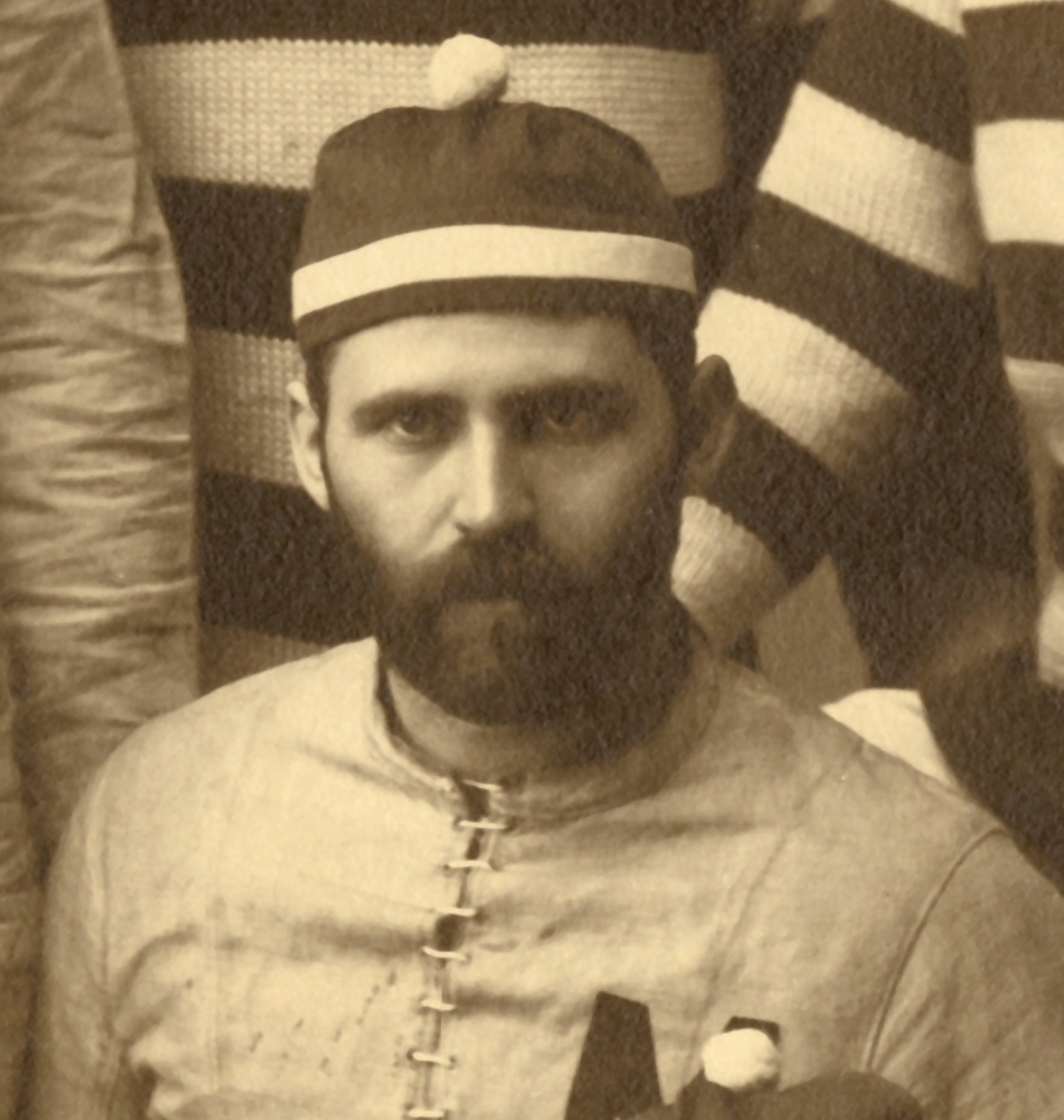
Michigan's Horace Greely Prettyman was ejected for "slugging" in the 1888 and 1889 games at Chicago.

In 1888, Michigan returned to Chicago for a Thanksgiving Day game against the Chicago University Club. The Chicago University Club team was a "picked team" selected from the best athletes in the West, many of whom had played college football for Yale, Princeton, Harvard, or Columbia. The New York Times wrote that "the preparatory schools and the universities had been drained for the best talent in sight." Michigan lost by a 26 to 4 score in a game played at the Chicago Baseball Park and attended by 3,000 persons. The New York Times and Outing magazine both called it "undoubtedly the greatest football event that ever took place in the West."

Football was new to Chicago in 1888, and the Chicago Daily Tribune therefore published a lengthy summary of the game's rules, jargon, and methods on the day before the game. The Tribune described prize-fighting as "a mild sport" in comparison to football: "In a football game a player who gets possession of the ball may be attacked by anywhere from one to eleven men. . . . Slugging is not allowed, but 'tackling' is. A tackle, as described below, is a delightful and exciting point of play. . . . The man who is tackled, if game, will endeavor to hold the ball while the members of both teams will try to form a mountain on top of him."

The game attracted many representatives of Chicago's high society. The Chicago Daily Tribune wrote: "The finest turnouts of the city with the leaders of Chicago beauty decked in furs and favorite college colors swept into the grounds. Four-in-hands, tally-hos, tandem drags, English carts, mail phaetons, carriages and all sorts of fashionable vehicles were in the stream. Their occupants did not know much about football and did not entirely approve of the rough and gory sport, but came out in force to applaud for 'our boys.'" A bugle on a tally-ho belonging to Chicago quarterback Harry Hamlin announced the arrival of the Chicago team at the playing field.

Early in the contest, Michigan's starting center Horace Greely Prettyman was ejected for "slugging" Chicago's center, Peters. The New York Times wrote: "Prettyman lost his temper and struck Peters in the mouth twice with his fist." The Times called Prettyman "the backbone of the Michigan rush line" and noted that the team was disheartened after his ejection. The Chicago Daily Tribune emphasized the physical nature of the battle: "Not a man on either team had escaped blood. Noses were bleeding profusely, every man's lips were cut and swollen faces were plastered with mud, and lame joints and twitching backs were many." The game drew extensive press coverage, and The Chronicle from Ann Arbor opined with respect to the game of football that "the fever may now be said to be upon us."

=== 1889: Chicago University Club 20, Michigan 0 ===
Michigan returned to Chicago on Thanksgiving Day in 1889 and lost for the second consecutive year against the Chicago University Club, this time by a score of 20 to 0. The game was played in "a swirling snow storm" on "as treacherous a field as ever athletes worked upon." For the second consecutive year, Michigan's Prettyman was ejected from the game, this time for slugging Chicago's quarterback, Gamble Rogers.

=== 1891: Chicago University Club 20, Michigan 0 ===
Michigan returned to Chicago on November 14, 1891, for its third game in four years against the Chicago University Club. The Chicago University Club was again a "picked team" made up of former stars from Harvard, Yale, Princeton, and other schools. The Chicago team included W.J. Crawford, who led the undefeated national champion 1884 Yale team and was "the most famous halfback of his time, "Snake" Ames, who had set the college scoring record with 730 points and was later inducted into the College Football Hall of Fame, Ben "Sport" Donnelly, the second professional player in football history, and William C. Malley, who had played for Michigan in his student years.

The game was played at the South Side Baseball Grounds in Chicago. Although University of Michigan records reflect the score as a 10–0 loss for the Wolverines, contemporaneous press accounts report the score as 20 to 0. The Detroit Free Press reported: "After a hard fight, during which neither side scored until the second innings, the Chicago University team won the great foot ball match against the University of Michigan by 20 points to nothing. It was a gallant battle, the Michigan men contesting every inch gained by their opponents."

With a growing fan-base in Chicago, Michigan played a second game in that city at the end of the 1891 season. That game, a 10–0 loss to Cornell, was also played at the South Side Baseball Grounds. The New York Times called it "one of the prettiest foot-ball games ever played in the West" and described the wintry conditions of the game: "The field was covered with a six-inch blanket of snow, the air was icy, and frosted feet and hands were among the thousands of spectators ... Three minutes after the game began the ball was covered with ice, but the dazzling white ground soon began to look as though a herd of elephants had been tramping on it."

== The rivalry at its peak: 1892 to 1905 ==
=== 1892: Michigan 18, Chicago 10 ===
In the fall of 1892, the University of Chicago fielded its first football team with Amos Alonzo Stagg serving as both head coach and starting right halfback. On November 13, 1892, the Maroons and Wolverines played their first game, on a wet and muddy field in front of a crowd estimated at between 700 and 1,500 spectators at Olympic Park in Toledo, Ohio. Michigan won by a score of 18 to 10. Right halfback George Jewett, the first African-American to play football for a Big Ten school, was the star for Michigan. Game accounts are imprecise, but Jewett was responsible for two Michigan touchdowns (one on a toss to Frank Decke) and possibly a third and also kicked for goals after touchdown.

In January 1893, Ralph Stone (1868–1956), who later served as a Regent of the University of Michigan, expressed hope that a rivalry with Chicago might help overcome the "woeful" lack of loyalty to alma mater. He wrote:

"The apparent lack of patriotism among our alumni is largely due to the fact that while in college there was little or no incentive to college spirit, so-called, growing out of contests with other colleges. Michigan has always been without a near-at-hand rival. Therefore, her alumni were born, brought up, and graduated into the world without much of an opportunity to yell, fight and bet upon her college base-ball team, foot-ball team, or crew. Perhaps the University of Chicago, under the leadership of Stagg, may alter matters in this respect in the near future. . . . The athletic competition which is now awakening will rouse a more active display of their latent enthusiasm, and it will do it without sacrificing the real and more serious purpose of the University. While we deplore the excessive attention now paid at times to athletics, we cannot deny that athletic prestige does much to help a university in more substantial ways."

=== 1893: Chicago and Michigan each win a game ===
In 1893, Michigan and Chicago played twice. Stagg's Chicago Maroons won the first meeting on October 21, 1893, by a 10 to 6 score at the University of Chicago Athletic Grounds. Each team scored a touchdown and goal after touchdown to tie the score at 6–6 at halftime. Chicago scored a touchdown in the second half, but missed the goal from touchdown. As time was running out, Michigan moved the ball to the edge of the chalk line when the referee called time.

Michigan returned to Chicago for a rematch on Thanksgiving Day. The Thanksgiving game was played at the University of Chicago's new Ellis Avenue grounds with a crowd of 3,500 in attendance, and Michigan won by a 28 to 10 score. Michigan took a 24–0 lead at halftime, and Chicago played better in the second half as snow blanketed the field, making it difficult for the "fat, chunky, little fellows" from Michigan to keep their footing. The Chicago Daily Tribune wrote: "The Ann Arbor men are mainly short and fat, weighing an average of 185 pounds, and their attack is like the rush of a battering ram. Several of the local men on the contrary are lightweights and their line looked feeble before the grim lads from Ann Arbor."

=== 1894: Michigan 6, Chicago 4 ===
On November 29, 1894, the two teams again met on Thanksgiving Day, this time at Marshall Field in Chicago. Two hours before kickoff a "driving sleet storm" hit the city, and when the players lined up "the grounds were better fitted for skating rink purposes rather than a gridiron." Despite the weather, a large crowd turned out to watch the game. According to a newspaper account, "the grand stand and outfield were packed with yelling collegians, and the boxes and carriage rooms were well filled with society people." An account published in the Detroit Free Press described the atmosphere surrounding the game:

"Notwithstanding the threatening weather, fully 6,000 of Chicago's best and fairest witnessed the hardest fought battle ever seen in Chicago. . . . The east and south sides of the field were lined with tally-hos, landaus, etc. Everyone wore the colors of one of the colleges. The yellow and blue of Michigan was as prominently displayed as was the maroon of Chicago. Everyone was out to yell for his respective team and from the noise it seemed as if pandemonium had been turned loose."

Some accounts indicate that Michigan had been expected to "bury the Chicagos under a big score," while others indicated that "the betting was even on the two teams." Chicago scored the game's first touchdown on an end run by Nichols less than ten minutes into the game. However, Chicago missed the try for goal after touchdown. The first half ended with the score 4 to 0 in favor of Chicago. Michigan's Gustave Ferbert scored a touchdown late in the second half, and John A. Bloomingston kicked the goal after touchdown. Michigan won by a final score of 6 to 4.

One newspaper account of the game stated that Chicago had outplayed Michigan for 67 minutes, "but in three minutes victory was wrested from Capt. Stagg's men and perched on the yellow and blue banner of the college from across the lake." A controversy arose after the game as Michigan supporters charged that "Stagg had secured [Michigan]'s signals and made use of the knowledge, hoping to win by any means, however questionable." In another account, the Detroit Free Press complained of biased officiating by the umpire, Phil Allen, who was a cousin of Chicago's captain. The large attendance solidified Chicago's status as Michigan's "natural rival," and The Michigan Alumnus reported that "all parties hope to make this game the leading athletic event of the west, but above all to have the contest manly and free from criticism."

=== 1895: Michigan 12, Chicago 0 ===
In 1895, Michigan and Chicago again ended their football seasons with a Thanksgiving Day game, this one played in front of more than 6,000 spectators at Marshall Field in Chicago. Due to inclement weather, the field had to be "carefully scraped and sawdust scattered over the thin layer of ice" before the game began. Michigan's first scoring drive came in the first half when the right halfback, John Hollister, took the ball on Chicago's 45-yard line and ran around the right end for a 35-yard gain, a play the press called "a prettily-executed criss cross." Later in the drive, Michigan's star Frederick W. Henninger fumbled the ball which rolled beyond the goal line where it was recovered by J. De Forest Richards for a Michigan touchdown. The running of Michigan's fullback John A. Bloomingston, a Chicago native, was reportedly the high point of the game. A Chicago newspaper described one run by Bloomingston as follows:

"Chicago could not gain, and Neel was forced to punt again. Bloomingston received the ball, and, dodging the tacklers, who sought to bring him to the ground, ran back the entire length of the kick. It was a splendid performance, and no small part of the applause the hero received came from Chicago throats."

The final score was 12–0. Michigan's dominance over Stagg's team led one Chicago newspaper to write the following:

"The Michigan team is the finest set of football players Ann Arbor has ever sent out and completely out-classes any team in the West. ... The Michigan play both individually and in team work was magnificent. Even the worried Chicago substitutes and coaches on the side line could not refrain from an occasional word of admiration at the perfect defense of the visitors. The very appearance of the team was enough to bring applause from the most prejudiced Chicago supporter. ... [T]he local team appeared like school-boys before them. It seemed almost wonderful that these giants could be kept from sweeping down the field and scoring as they willed."

Following the game The World of New York wrote that the Michigan players had "clinched their claim to the Western championship."

=== 1896: Indoor football ===
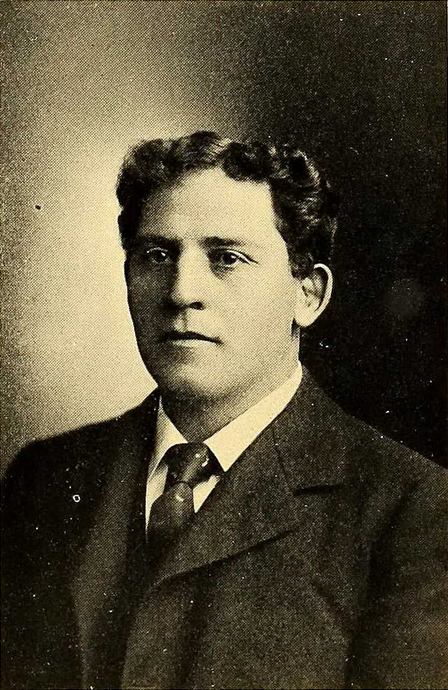
Amos Alonzo Stagg in 1899

In 1896, Michigan and Chicago met on Thanksgiving Day with the Western Conference championship on the line. Stagg's Chicago Maroons won the game, 7–6, in what was described as "one of the most desperately contested games ever played in Chicago." The game featured "few trick plays," as both teams relied on "straight, hard football." Hazen Pingree Jr. (whose father, Hazen S. Pingree, had been elected Governor of Michigan three weeks earlier) was the star of the game for Michigan. Chicago's scoring came on a blocked punt resulting in a safety and a drop kick (worth five points under the rules at the time) by Clarence Herschberger from the 45–yard line.

The most unusual feature of the 1896 Michigan-Chicago game was that it was played indoors at the Chicago Coliseum and was "the first collegiate game of football played under a roof." Adding to the novelty, as daylight turned to darkness, the field inside the Coliseum was lit with electric lighting. According to a newspaper account, the field grew dark in the second half, and play was halted for ten minutes to discuss whether play should continue. Play was resumed, and the lights were finally turned on after Michigan scored a touchdown.

The crowd was stated in varying press accounts to be either 15,000, or 20,000. Noting that the game was played in the same building "in which five months ago W. J. Bryan was nominated for the presidency," the press proclaimed the experiment in indoor football to be a success:

"One thing at least was settled by the game, and that is, that indoor football is literally and figuratively speaking a howling success. The men had no trouble in catching punts, and football was played on its merits, without the handicaps of a wet field or a strong wind. Toward the end of the second half it got very dark, and the spectators were treated to a novelty in the shape of football by electric light."

Another newspaper described the novelty of indoor football as follows:

"Indoor football is an innovation, but it promises to become a permanency for late games. While the other fields about Chicago were sloppy and the players were floundering about in the seas of mud, the athletes in the Coliseum played on dry surface and secure from the elements. A two-inch layer of tan bark was placed over the hard earth, and there was no inconvenience from dust. None of the punts touched the beams overhead and spectators and players were captivated with the comfortable conditions under which the game was played. Darkness came on at 4:00 and the players were scarcely distinguishable for a time, but electric lights soon rendered each play distinct."

=== 1897: Chicago 21, Michigan 12 ===
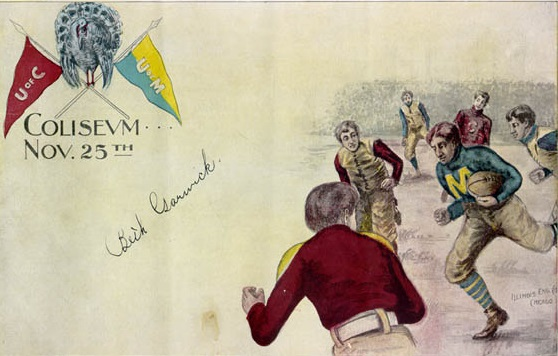
1897 souvenir program

In 1897, the teams closed their season for the fifth straight year with a Thanksgiving Day game in Chicago. The game was played in front of a crowd of 12,000 spectators at the Chicago Coliseum. Chicago scored first on a 35-yard run by Gardner. Chicago's fullback, Clarence Herschberger, kicked the goal after touchdown to give the Maroons a 6 to 0 lead. Herschberger next added a drop kick field goal from the 17-yard line to increase Chicago's lead to 11 to 0 at the end of the first half. In the second half, Clayton Teetzel, playing at left end, scored a touchdown for Michigan on a 15-yard run through Chicago's left tackle and end. Teetzel added the goal after touchdown to make the score 11 to 6. Herschberger added two more field goals to increase Chicago's lead to 22 to 6. Michigan's scored a second touchdown when Michigan's fullback, Frederick Hannan, kicked the ball for Michigan from its own 25-yard line. The ball touched a Chicago player, and Michigan tackle, William F. Baker, grabbed the ball and ran 55 yards for a touchdown. Teetzel kicked the goal from touchdown resulting in a final score of 21 to 12. Although Michigan scored two touchdowns to Chicago's one touchdown, field goals were worth five points in 1897, and Herschberger's three field goals were worth 15 points.

=== 1898: Birth of "The Victors" ===
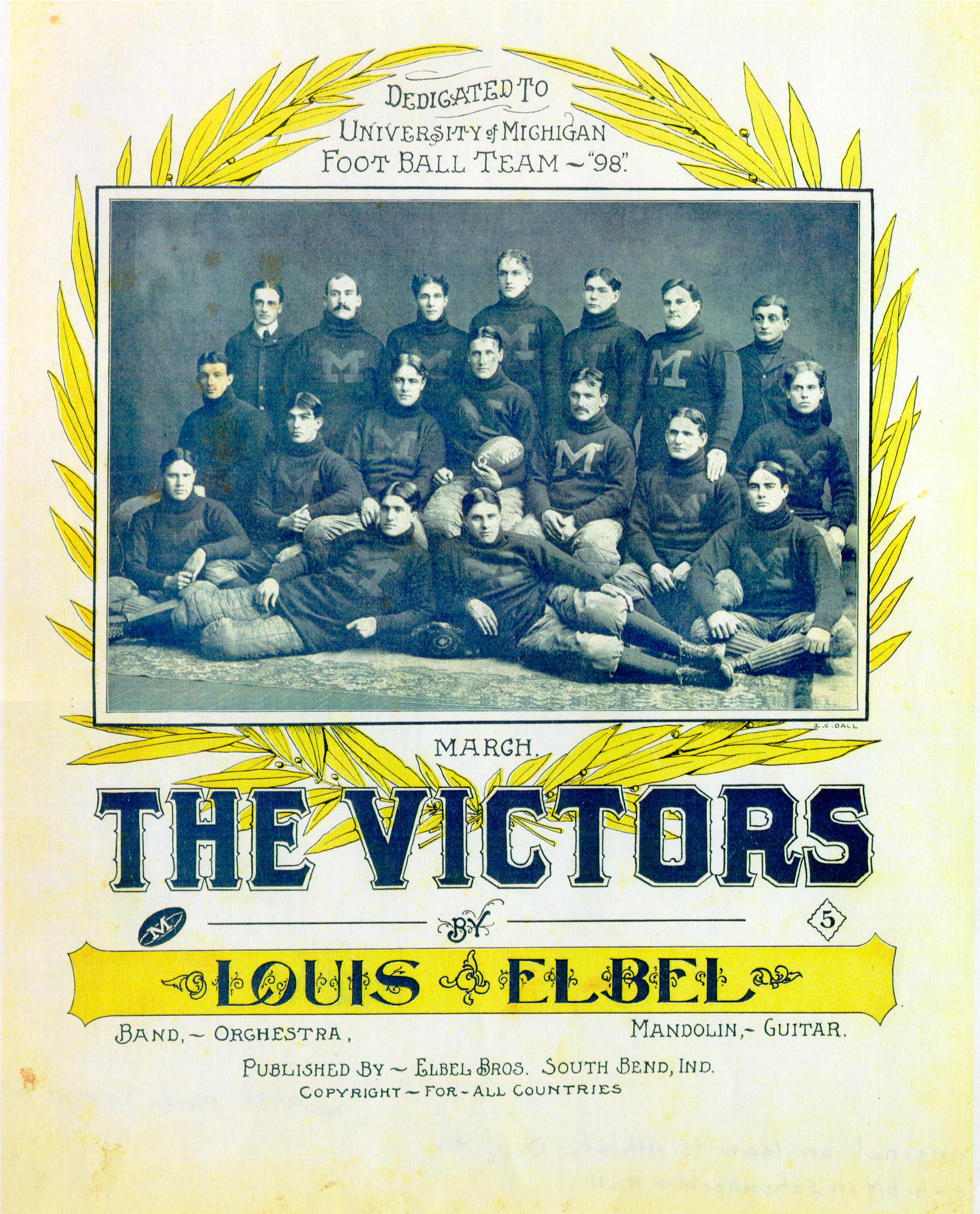
Louis Elbel composed Michigan's fight song "The Victors" (original sheet music pictured) as a tribute to Michigan's 1898 victory over Chicago.

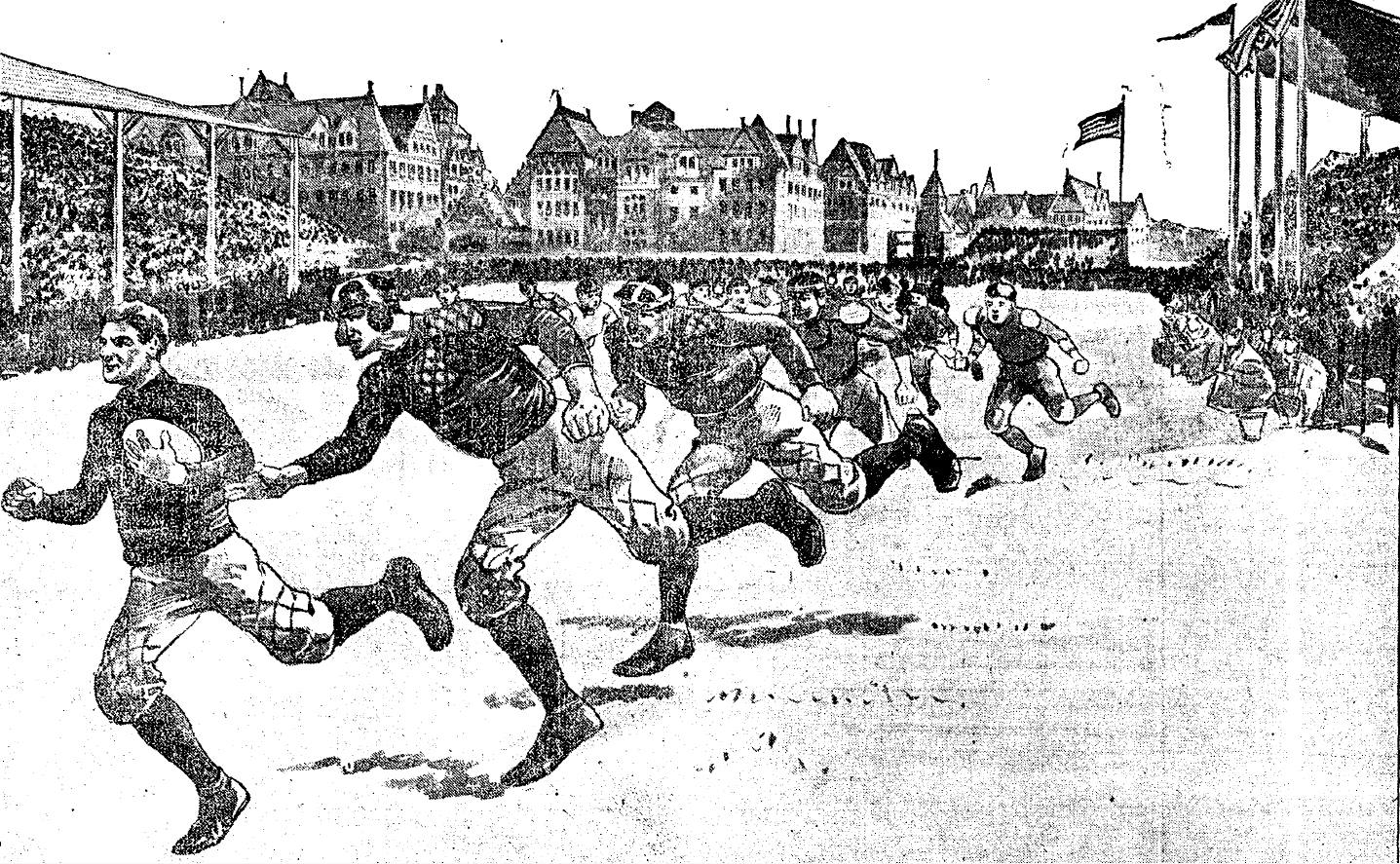
Illustration of Widman's run

The 1898 Michigan-Chicago game proved to be one of the most significant in the history of the rivalry. Michigan concluded its undefeated season on Thanksgiving Day with a 12–11 victory over the Maroons at Marshall Field. The game was played for the championship of the Western Conference. In order to accommodate the crowd of Michigan fans traveling to Chicago for the game, the Michigan Central Railroad arranged for two special trains to run from Ann Arbor to Chicago at a round trip price of five dollars. The special excursion tickets allowed fans to spend the weekend in Chicago and return on Monday.

A crowd of 12,000 spectators attended the game. The New York Times wrote: "The day and the grounds were ideal for football. The thermometer was lingering around the freezing mark, but the sky was cloudless, and the northwest wind was too light to interfere with the placing of punts." The Chicago team was favored and was reported to be "the heaviest that ever represented a college, the average weight of the men being over 190 pounds."

Michigan's first score came after 25 minutes of play on a run by Charles Widman from the five-yard line. Widman was shoved over the goal line for a touchdown, and Neil Snow kicked the extra point to give Michigan a 6 to 0 lead. Later in the half, Chicago drove the ball to Michigan's 30-yard-line, and the Maroons' All-American Clarence Herschberger kicked a field goal from placement to cut Michigan's lead to 6 to 5. (Field goals were counted as five points.)

Early in the second half, Michigan scored its second touchdown and converted the extra point to take a 12–5 lead. Widman ran 65 yards for the touchdown on a "delayed pass" on the most exciting play of the game. The Chicago Daily Tribune described Widman's run:

"Widman scurried out of the back of the mass of players with the ball under his arm and down the field with nothing in sight ahead of him except the goal posts. All the fast men of the Chicago team went in fast pursuit. It was a beautiful race down the field. Three Chicago men were close behind. But the blue-legged runner gained almost imperceptibly at times, and then barely held his own. He could run as fast as his pursuers, and with his start was safe. If one or two of those Chicago players had made a dive for him perhaps he might have been stopped. One of them did try up near the goal, but missed him, tripping him slightly, but he rolled over the line. Michigan had another touchdown and the game, and the Western championship in its pocket."

Widman described the run after the game as follows:

"The play was a revolving wedge on Chicago's left tackle. Their end and tackle had been drawn in by our men, and when the ball was given to me on a delayed pass I had a clear field, except for Chicago's backs. I ran as fast as I could diagonally across the field, realizing that I was hotly pursued. At last I was tackled on what I afterwards learned was about the six-yard line. I was slightly dazed by the fall, but saw a goal post ahead of me and managed to crawl over the line. I did not know I had made a touchdown, however, until Captain Bennett told me."

Snow added his second extra point kick to give Michigan a 12–5 lead. Chicago responded with a touchdown run by its left guard, Burnett, and the extra point reduced Michigan's lead to a single point. Michigan forced Chicago to punt on its final possession, and the Wolverines became champions of the Western Conference for the first time in the school's history.

One newspaper noted: "Michigan, with the exception of one or two double passes, relied almost altogether on straight football, line bucking and runs around the end. Chicago, on the contrary, used trick plays throughout but the team work was of a high order, as shown by both teams." After the game, Michigan's team captain, J.W.F. Bennett, told reporters: "Widman's sensational run was the feature of the game, but every player deserves the victory. We must thank Keene Fitzpatrick for our splendid condition." Chicago coach Amos Alonzo Stagg said: "It was perhaps the finest game of football ever played in the West. It certainly was spectacular and full of features."

During the 1898 game, 1,000 students gathered at the Athens Theater in Ann Arbor where they listened to a play-by-play account of the game as it was transmitted by telegraph from Chicago. Michigan gains were met with cheering. When Widman's touchdown run was announced, "It seemed as if the whole assembly was thrown into the air by a volcanic eruption. Men threw their hats and coats at one another and hugged and danced in the aisles for fully ten minutes." After the game, the crowd marched through the streets to President James B. Angell's home. President Angell greeted the crowd with a broad smile and said, "I congratulate you on the success of the Michigan team in Chicago this afternoon. It is a great victory, and we owe much to the men who have won the laurels of our victory from the brow of our sister institution of learning. It has been said that I am opposed to the game, but I wish to say that I, too, used to play in college. In those days, however, we played the Herschberger game, and used to kick the ball instead of the man. It is a great termination of the fall campaign, and we are greatly indebted to those who have so actively participated in it."

In Chicago, more than 1,000 Michigan fans paraded in a line through the University of Chicago campus behind the Michigan band singing Michigan songs and cheers. The parade ended at the Hotel Del Prado, where several Michigan players and alumni delivered speeches. On the Monday evening following the victory in Chicago, the team was welcomed back to Ann Arbor with a "rousing celebration." More than 2,000 students gathered around a huge bonfire, singing and cheering "until nearly midnight." It was reported that the Michigan students turned out with more enthusiasm than had been shown in Ann Arbor since the 1895 football team returned from a game against Harvard.

After watching Michigan's 12–11 victory over Chicago in 1898, Louis Elbel, who was at the time a student in the University of Michigan School of Music, was inspired to write "The Victors," which was later adopted as Michigan's fight song. He reportedly began composing the song at his sister's house in the Englewood section of Chicago and continued the effort on the return train ride from Chicago to Ann Arbor. Elbel's lyric, "Champions of the West," refers to Michigan's having won the Western Conference championship for the first time in the school's history. Elbel later recalled:

"We were crazed with joy. We paraded in the dark. We yelled and followed our U-M Band, singing to the tune of 'Hot Time in the Old Town.' It struck me quite suddenly that such an epic should be dignified by something more elevating, for this was not ordinary victory. My spirits were so uplifted that I was clear off the earth, and that is when 'The Victors' was inspired. I put in a lot of 'hails' and I knew the fellows would get them in with the proper emphasis. Through them, the title suggested itself, and I dedicated it to the Michigan team of 1898."

=== 1900: Chicago 15, Michigan 6 ===
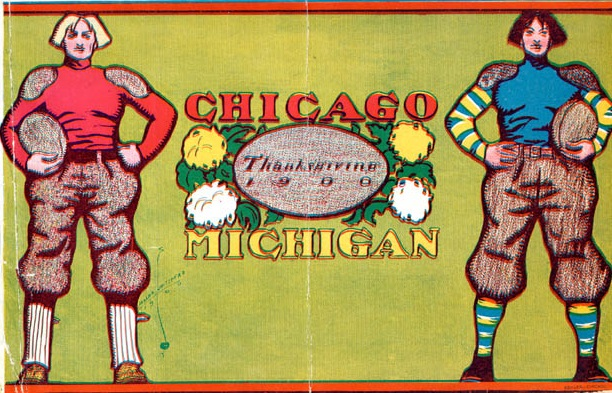
1900 game program

After a one-year break in the rivalry, Michigan and Chicago played their traditional Thanksgiving Day game at Stagg Field in Chicago on November 29, 1900. Michigan scored first, recovering a fumble well into Chicago's territory and scoring on a run by tackle Hugh White. Chicago fullback Ernest Perkins responded with three touchdowns, and the Maroons won by a score of 15 to 6.

With Michigan leading 6 to 5 at the half, the most unusual moment of the 1900 game came during the intermission when 30 candidates for Chicago's "Three-Quarter" club gathered on the field to sacrifice a yearling rooster named Iphigenia. A Michigan player tried unsuccessfully to rescue the rooster. The rooster was killed, and its blood was spread on the field as the candidates danced. Chicago scored two touchdowns after the ceremony, and the Chicago Daily Tribune speculated that "the chicken's ghost was playing with the maroons."

=== 1901: Michigan 22, Chicago 0 ===
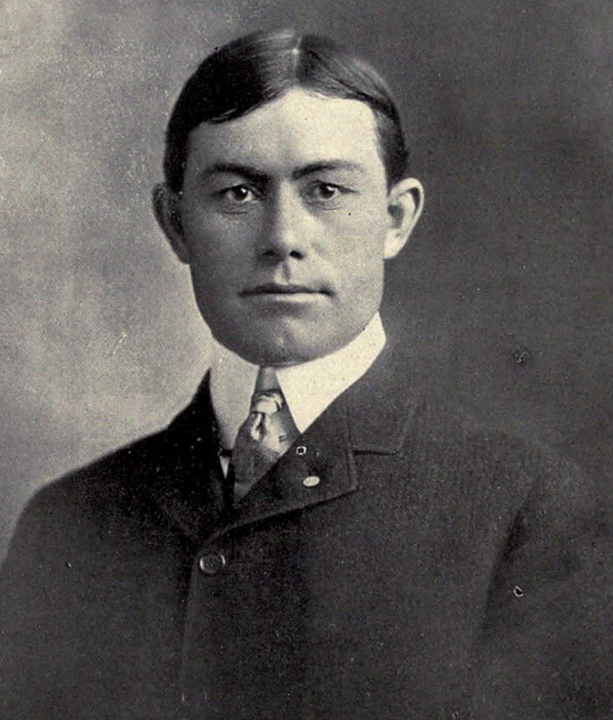
Fielding H. Yost compiled a 22–0 record in his first two years as Michigan's coach.

In 1901, Fielding H. Yost took over as Michigan's head coach. The Wolverines finished the season undefeated with an 11–0 record, outscored their opponents by the unprecedented total of 550 to 0, and became known as the first of Yost's famed "Point-a-Minute" teams. Stagg's Chicago Maroons were able to slow, but not stop, Michigan's point-a-minute offense. Michigan won by a 22 to 0 score as the game was played for the first time on Michigan's home field in Ann Arbor. Yost noted, "I knew long before I came to Michigan of the great rivalry existing between this University and the University of Chicago. It was my desire to win this game above all others." The game was played at Regents Field in front of one of the largest crowds that ever attended a game up to that time in Ann Arbor. Michigan left tackle Hugh White scored two touchdowns, and fullback Neil Snow and right tackle Bruce Shorts each scored one touchdown. Michigan's defense held the Chicago offense to two first downs, and Chicago only once had possession of the ball in Michigan territory. Despite the win, Coach Yost was disappointed with the low point total accumulated by his team and publicly stated that "we would have scored many more points on Chicago if the field had been dry." Yost described the impact of the weather on his team as follows: "Much to our disappointment the game was played on a muddy field in a snowstorm, and the work of our backs was seriously handicapped. The Chicago team was not to the same extent handicapped by reason of the fact that it did not rely upon speed to advance the ball. ... End-running was impossible, and we were compelled to make our gains by line-bucking which is a slow process ..."

=== 1902: Michigan 21, Chicago 0 ===
In 1902, Yost's second "Point-a-Minute" team finished the season undefeated with an 11–0 record and outscored their opponents by a combined score of 644 to 12. In the second meeting between the two legendary coaches, Stagg and Yost, Michigan won, 21–0 in front of a crowd of 14,000 at Chicago's Marshall Field. The game began at 2:15 p.m. Before the game started, the Michigan fans in attendance released toy red balloons marked "Chicago" into the "somewhat murky and frosty atmosphere." One Michigan fan, described as "a long-haired collegian wearing a yellow and blue streamer, told a reporter, "That is the way we will toss Chicago up in the air."

Everett Sweeley gave Michigan a 5–0 lead with a field goal from a difficult angle at the 25-yard line. Later in the first half, Heston took the ball on a delayed pass and ran 71 yards for a touchdown. Michigan led 10–0 at halftime. In the second half, Sweeley extended Michigan's lead to 15–0 with a field goal from the 17-yard line. With approximately 10 minutes remaining in the game, left tackle William Palmer ran for a touchdown, and Sweeley converted the goal from touchdown to give Michigan its final total of 21 points. Despite the successive defeats, Stagg was credited with developing a "magnificent defense to hold Yost's 'hurry up' offense to 21 points in 70 minutes of play."

=== 1903: Michigan 28, Chicago 0 ===
The 1903 Chicago-Michigan game was another of the most historic games in the series. Yost's third "Point-a-Minute" team compiled an 11–0-1 record and outscored opponents 565 to 6. In the third meeting between Yost and Stagg, Yost won again by a 28 to 0 score. The New York Times reported that the game was attended by a record-setting crowd: "All records for attendance were broken, fully 20,000 enthusiastic spectators braving a heavy snowfall to see the game." Another account placed the attendance at 15,000. The Michigan Alumnus noted that Michigan men regarded Chicago as "their dearest rival," and the Thanksgiving Day game at Marshall Field marked the culmination of the season.

A blizzard threatened cancellation of the game, but the snow stopped suddenly and the wind died down in the early afternoon. The game was commenced at 2:00 pm after seven or eight inches of snow were cleared from the field.

Stagg's 1903 team featured three future College Football Hall of Fame inductees: Walter Eckersall at quarterback, Hugo Bezdek at right halfback, and Tiny Maxwell at right tackle. All-American Frederick A. Speik also played at left end for the 1903 Maroons. The two teams were expected to be evenly matched, but the game, played on a snowy and slippery field, proved to be one-sided. Chicago was handicapped by the illness of Coach Stagg who directed the game from a closed carriage where he lay "bundled up in blankets."

Michigan scored on every drive in the first half, save one, and Chicago made only one first down in the first half. Eckersall's defensive play was praised in accounts of the game, though, on one play, Willie Heston eluded Eckersall "by a well-timed hurdle" for a 20-yard gain. Heston scored two touchdowns, but Tom Hammond was the leading scorer with 13 points on two field goals (five points each) and three point after touchdown kicks. The game was played in halves of 35 and 20 minutes, with the second half being cut short to avoid playing after darkness had fallen.

Walter Camp attended the game, watching from the sidelines. Camp offered the following comments:

"The helping of the men on the Michigan team was high-grade football. Their work at helping the man with the ball was as good as that displayed in any game I have seen this season. This is the first western game I have witnessed this year. I was particularly impressed with the work of Heston as a halfback."

The Chicago Daily Tribune opened its game coverage, "The premature blizzard which descended on Chicago yesterday made it anything but an ideal football day, but that driving snow storm was gentleness itself compared to what was in store for Chicago's two football elevens." The Detroit Free Press called it "the most severe drubbing ever administered to the Maroons in the history of football of that institution." Noted sports writer Joe S. Jackson wrote: "Chicago was not beaten – it was run over, buffeted about, almost made the sport of its opponents at times . . ."

The Michigan team was the guest of the Studebaker Theatre the evening after the game.

At a post-season dinner, Fielding Yost said that he regarded Michigan's play in the Chicago game to be "the best he had ever seen by a Michigan team during his three years here." Michigan's captain, Curtis Redden, opined that the spectators saw "the finest exhibition of speed and team work ever seen in the West."

=== 1904: Michigan 22, Chicago 12 ===
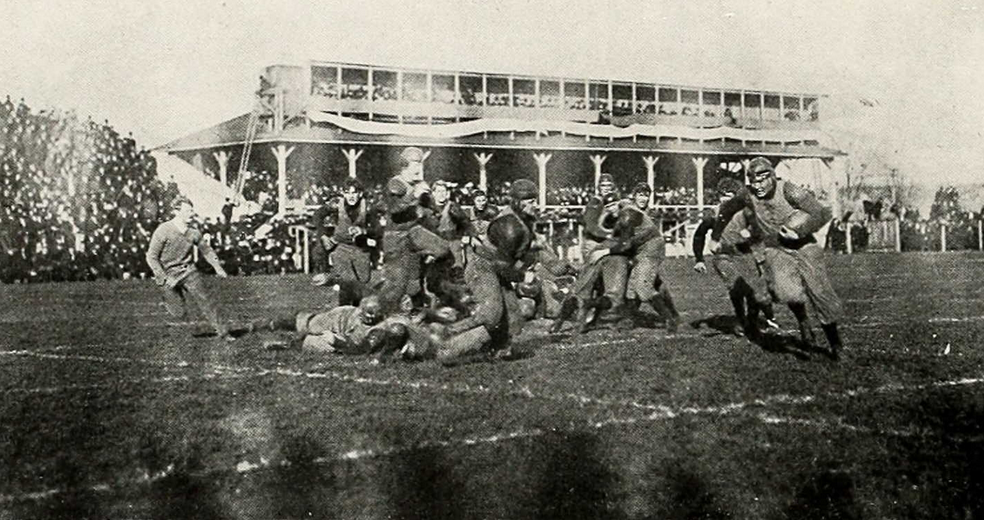
Image of the 1904 game

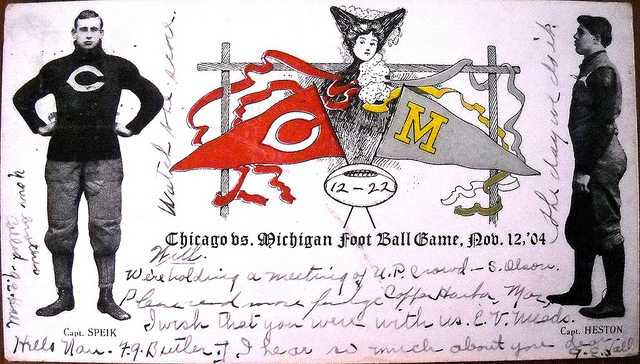
Souvenir postcard from the 1904 game

In 1904, Yost led his fourth "Point-a-Minute" team to a perfect 10–0 record, outscoring opponents 567 to 22. Michigan concluded its undefeated season with a 22–12 win over Chicago on November 12. The game, played in 35-minute halves, featured several College Football Hall of Fame inductees, including Walter Eckersall and Hugo Bezdek for Chicago and Willie Heston and Germany Schulz for Michigan. Heston, Eckersall and Bezdek each scored single touchdowns, but the lead scorer was Michigan's Tom Hammond with 17 points on three touchdowns and two extra points. Video excerpts from this game are available to view at the Library of Congress.

=== 1905: Chicago 2, Michigan 0 ===
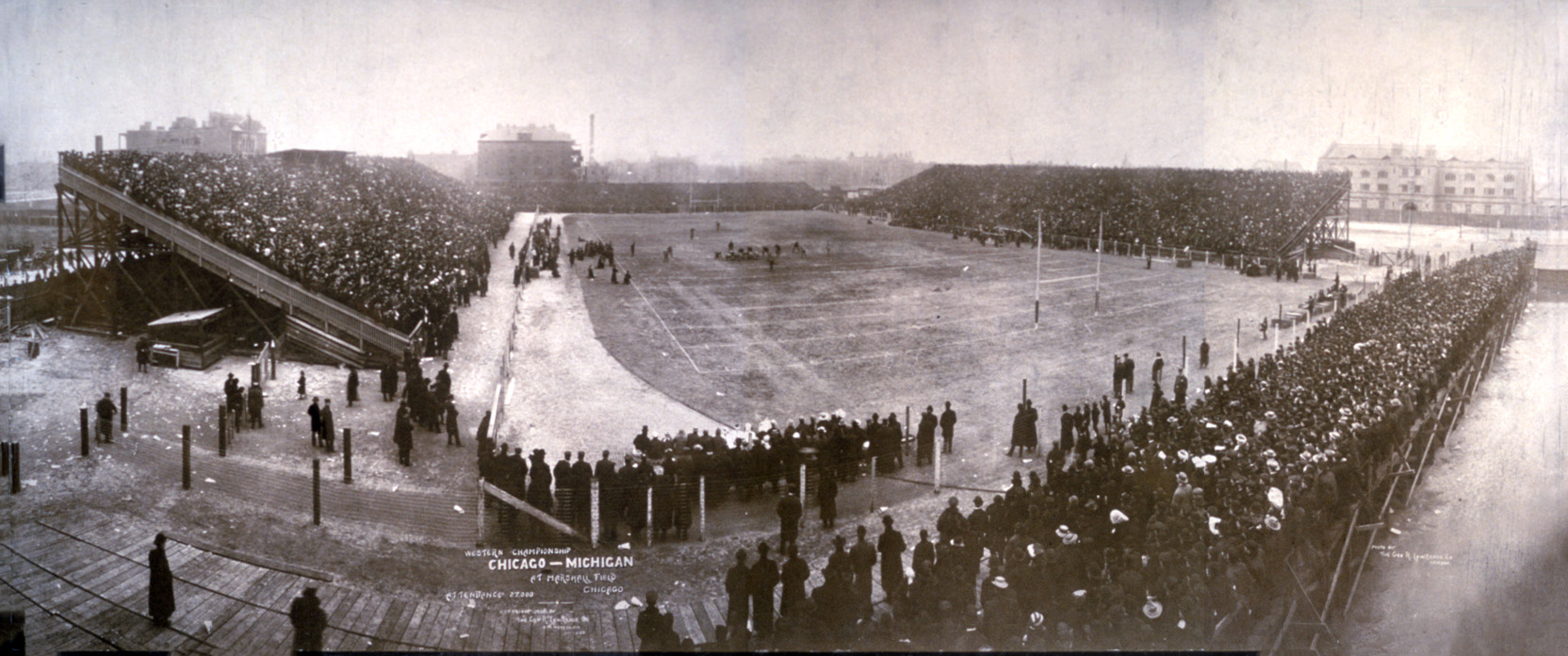
1905 College Football Western Championship match between Michigan and Chicago

Chicago won the 1905 meeting of the rivals by a score of 2 to 0. The game, dubbed "The First Greatest Game of the Century," broke Michigan's 56-game unbeaten streak and marked the end of the "Point-a-Minute" years. The 1905 Michigan team had outscored opponents 495 to 0 in its first 12 games. The game was lost in the final ten minutes of play when Denny Clark was tackled for a safety as he attempted to return a punt from behind the goal line. Newspapers described Clark's play as "the wretched blunder" and a "lapse of brain work." Clark transferred to M.I.T. the following year and was haunted by the play for the rest of his life. In 1932, he shot himself, leaving a suicide note that reportedly expressed hope that his "final play" would atone for his error at Marshall Field in 1905.

After the 1905 game, the teams did not meet again until 1918.

== The rivalry renewed: 1918 to 1920 ==
=== 1918: Michigan 13, Chicago 0 ===
After a 12-year hiatus resulting from Michigan's withdrawal from the Western Conference, the rivalry resumed on November 9, 1918, at Stagg Field in Chicago. The Michigan team was reported to be determined to avenge the 1905 team's 2–0 loss to the Maroons. The game was played as negotiations were underway to end World War I, and the Chicago Daily Tribune wrote: "While the nations of the world are hoping for an armistice, the resumption of hostilities between forces guided by Gens. Yost and Stagg brought joy to thousands of football fans, and the opening battle attracted approximately 7,000 of them." Michigan won the 1918 game by a 13–0 score.

=== 1919: Chicago 13, Michigan 0 ===
The rivalry returned again to Stagg Field in November 1919. Noting that the 1918 game had matched Student Army Training Corps (S.A.T.C.) squads, the Chicago Daily Tribune billed the 1919 game as "the first renewal of [the] traditional gridiron rivalry" between the two universities. Every seat at Stagg Field was sold out as 25,000 spectators crammed into the stadium. Chicago won the 1919 game by a 13 to 0 score. After the game, Michigan coach Yost congratulated his old rival Stagg and said: "Your team played perfect football, making no mistakes, and the score represents the relative merits of the two teams."

=== 1920: Michigan 14, Chicago 0 ===
On November 13, 1920, Michigan and Chicago played at Ferry Field in Ann Arbor, with Michigan winning by a 14 to 0 score. A crowd of 32,000 was present, "jamming every inch of space." Halfback Eddie Usher scored both of Michigan's touchdowns. The punting of Frank Steketee was another feature of the game. One of his long punts was mishandled by Chicago's Fritz Crisler, who would later become Michigan's head coach. A "freak hop" caused the ball to bounce off Crisler, who was Chicago's quarterback in the game, and Michigan linemen piled on the ball at Chicago's nine-yard line. Crisler also made a "leaping interception" to prevent a Michigan touchdown on an earlier drive. In his first game at the quarterback position, the Chicago Daily Tribune credited Crisler with running the team well.

== Later years: 1927 to 1939 ==
=== 1927: Michigan 14, Chicago 0 ===
After a six-year hiatus, Michigan and Chicago resumed their rivalry in 1927. Although the game was only the fourth meeting between the old rivals since 1905, the Chicago Daily Tribune wrote that past matches between Stagg's Maroons and Yost's Wolverines "have been high points in football history," and noted that the renewal of "the ancient rivalry" meant "everything" to the "old-timers" in Ann Arbor and Chicago. The game was played at Stagg Field in Chicago, before a record-breaking crowd of 60,000 spectators, and ended in a 14–0 victory for Michigan. New bleachers were built at the east end of Stagg Field to accommodate interest in the game, which drew many distinguished spectators. The Chicago Daily Tribune wrote: "Probably no game in Chicago has drawn a more distinguished crowd."

=== 1930: Michigan 16, Chicago 0 ===
After another two-year hiatus in 1928 and 1929, Michigan and Chicago renewed their rivalry in the final game of the 1930 season at Michigan Stadium. Stagg remained as the head coach at Chicago, and Harry Kipke was in his second year as Michigan's head coach. Michigan won the game by a score of 16 to 0. Michigan's fullback Roy Hudson scored two touchdowns in the game, and Stanley Hozer added an extra point and a field goal. In the third quarter, the Michigan captain, James Simrall, threw a touchdown pass to Hudson from mid-field.

=== 1931: Michigan 13, Chicago 7 ===
By 1931, Amos Alonzo Stagg was 69 years old and had been the head coach at Chicago since 1892. In October 1931, the Maroons lost to the Wolverines by a 13–7 score in Ann Arbor, but the Chicago Daily Tribune wrote that Stagg "can go back to the Midway feeling right proud of his boys." Having been an underdog by a much larger margin, the Tribune called it a "moral victory" that Chicago scored a touchdown, something the team had failed to do in four meetings with Michigan since 1920.

=== 1932: Michigan 12, Chicago 0 ===
Michigan played its final home game of the 1932 season against the University of Chicago. Michigan won, 12–0. The game was played in the snow and with a cold wind blowing at Michigan Stadium. Michigan's first touchdown came in the second quarter on a 70-yard punt return down the middle of the field by Harry Newman. The second touchdown was also scored by Newman, this time in the last minute of the game on a 28-yard run off a fake pass play. The game was the last by Chicago head coach Amos Alonzo Stagg against Michigan. In a pre-game ceremony, members of the 1905 Michigan Wolverines football team presented Stagg with a silver pitcher and ten silver glasses.

=== 1933: Michigan 28, Chicago 0 ===
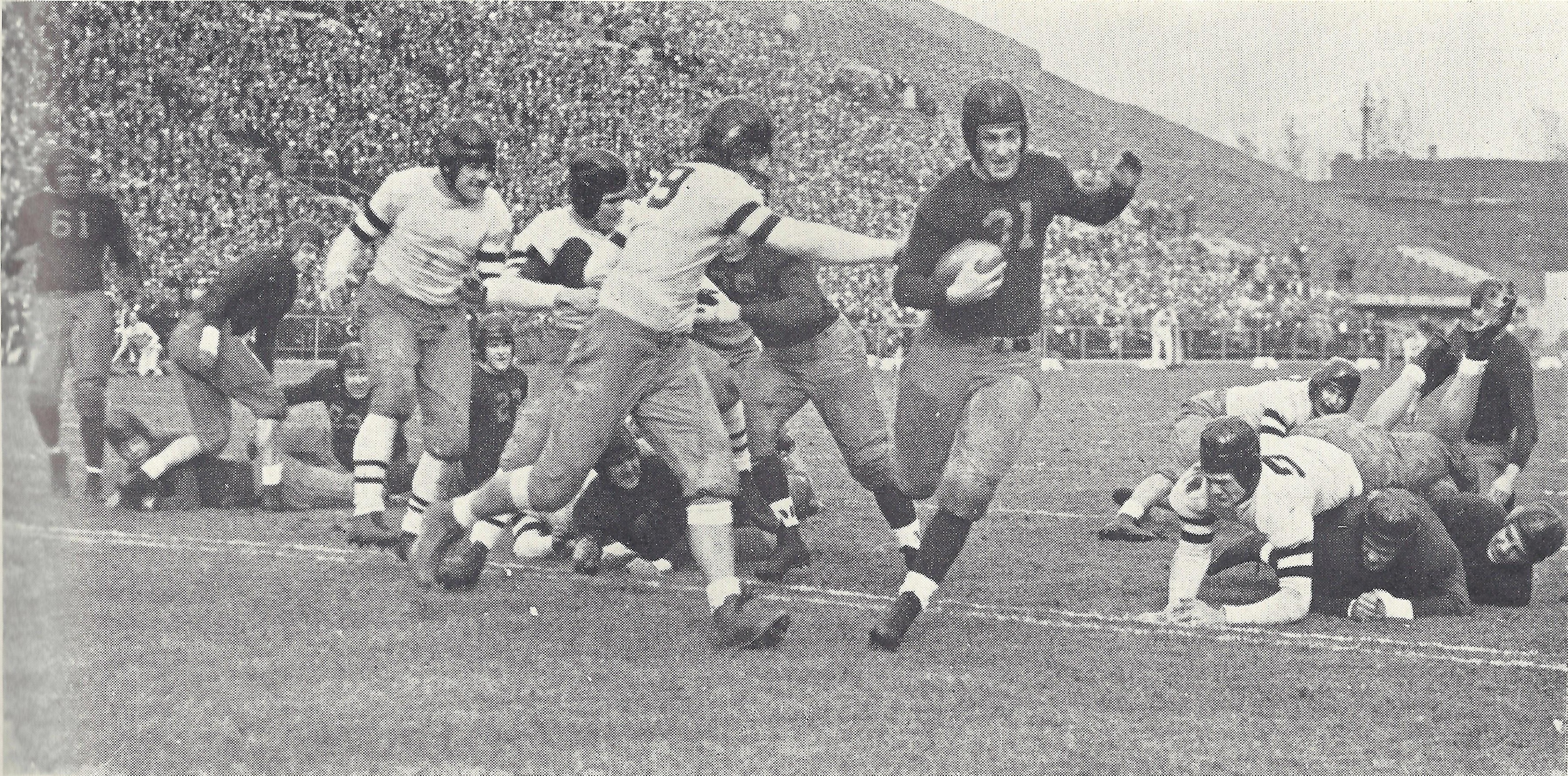
Herman Everhardus runs for a touchdown against Chicago in 1933.

Michigan and Chicago played in Chicago on October 28, 1933. The game attracted many Michigan fans, drawn by the lure of the 1933 World's Fair (called the Century of Progress) being held in Chicago. Michigan's backup center, Gerald Ford, expressed a desire to attend the fair while in Chicago. Days before the Chicago trip, the future U.S. president wrote to a friend joking that he may not have time to see Sally Rand, a famous fan dancer performing at the fair. After returning from Chicago, Ford wrote to the same friend: "Had a swell time in Chicago and didn't see Sally Rand either. Saw all of the fair in 25 minutes, at least all I wanted to see."

Chicago's 1933 football team was led by a new head coach, Clark Shaughnessy, and by Jay Berwanger, who won the first Heisman Trophy two years later. Although the 1933 Maroons were reputed to be "the best Chicago team in years," Michigan won, 28–0, the largest margin of victory recorded up to that time by Michigan against a Chicago team. On defense, Michigan allowed Chicago to cross the 50-yard line only twice, and one of those instances resulted from a Michigan fumble at its own 39-yard line.

=== 1934: Chicago 27, Michigan 0 ===
During the 1934 season, the Chicago Maroons were revived with by the play of their star halfback, Jay Berwanger. Michigan, on the other hand, experienced the worst season in its history, failing to win a single game in the Big Ten and scoring only 21 points in the entire season. The two teams met at Stagg Field in Chicago on October 13, 1934, and the Maroons routed the Wolverines 27 to 0 before a crowd of 25,000 spectators. The game marked the largest margin of victory for the Maroons in the long history of the Chicago–Michigan football rivalry. Berwanger scored two touchdowns, including a 43-yard scoring run. The Chicago Daily Tribune called the game a "sweet victory" for the "long oppressed" Maroons who had been "starved and bullied these many moons by unsympathetic neighbors in the Big Ten."

=== 1937: Michigan 13, Chicago 12 ===
After a two-year hiatus in 1935 and 1936, the Chicago–Michigan series was renewed in 1937. On November 6, 1937, Chicago lost to Michigan by a 13–12 score in Ann Arbor. The game began as a one-sided contest in favor of Chicago. With four minutes remaining in the final quarter, Chicago led by a score of 12 to 0, and it "indeed looked like a big night on the Midway in Chicago just as soon as their special train could carry the Maroons back there." Late in the game, a poor punt gave Michigan the ball at Chicago's 41-yard line. On the next play, the Michigan halfback ran 41 yards for a touchdown, and an extra point brought Michigan back to within five points. On Chicago's ensuing drive, Davenport fumbled, and Smick of Michigan recovered the ball at Chicago's 21-yard line. Ritchie scored again this time from the six-yard line. Ritchie's second touchdown gave the Wolverines a 13–12 lead that held in the final seconds.

=== 1938: Michigan 45, Chicago 7 ===
In 1938, the Michigan football team experienced a renaissance under it new head coach Fritz Crisler. It was the most points scored by a Michigan team since 1926. Chicago's lone touchdown came on a long pass from Lew Hamity to Big Ten sprint champion John Davenport who caught the ball in stride at Michigan's 45-yard line and ran the remaining distance for the score. Michigan sophomore Tom Harmon ran 54 yards for a touchdown on the third play of the third quarter.

=== 1939: Michigan 85, Chicago 0 ===
By 1939, Chicago's glory days in football were in its past. On October 21, 1939, the Maroons lost to the Wolverines by a score of 85 to 0. With the first string playing only 20 minutes, Michigan registered 461 yards of net offense, scored 55 points in the first half, and intercepted three Chicago passes. Tom Harmon scored three touchdowns, including a 56-yard run for his first score of the game.

== Game results ==
Chicago victories	Michigan victories

No.	Date	Location	Winner	Score
1	November 12, 1892	Toledo, OH	Michigan	18–10
2	October 21, 1893	Chicago, IL	Chicago	10–6
3	November 30, 1893	Chicago, IL	Michigan	28–10
4	November 29, 1894	Chicago, IL	Michigan	6–4
5	November 28, 1895	Chicago, IL	Michigan	12–0
6	November 26, 1896	Chicago, IL	Chicago	7–6
7	November 25, 1897	Chicago, IL	Chicago	21–12
8	November 24, 1898	Chicago, IL	Michigan	12–11
9	November 29, 1900	Chicago, IL	Chicago	15–6
10	November 16, 1901	Ann Arbor, MI	Michigan	22–0
11	November 15, 1902	Chicago, IL	Michigan	21–0
12	November 26, 1903	Chicago, IL	Michigan	28–0
13	November 12, 1904	Ann Arbor, MI	Michigan	22–12
14	November 30, 1905	Chicago, IL	Chicago	2–0

No.	Date	Location	Winner	Score
15	November 9, 1918	Chicago, IL	Michigan	13–0
16	November 8, 1919	Chicago, IL	Chicago	13–0
17	November 13, 1920	Ann Arbor, MI	Michigan	14–0
18	November 5, 1927	Chicago, IL	Michigan	14–0
19	November 22, 1930	Ann Arbor, MI	Michigan	16–0
20	October 10, 1931	Ann Arbor, MI	Michigan	13–7
21	November 12, 1932	Ann Arbor, MI	Michigan	12–0
22	October 28, 1933	Chicago, IL	Michigan	28–0
23	October 13, 1934	Chicago, IL	Chicago	27–0
24	November 6, 1937	Ann Arbor, MI	Michigan	13–12
25	October 8, 1938	Ann Arbor, MI	Michigan	45–7
26	October 21, 1939	Chicago, IL	No. 6 Michigan	85–0
Series: Michigan leads 19–7

== See also ==
- List of NCAA college football rivalry games
