= 1897 Chicago Maroons football team =

American college football season

1897 Chicago Maroons football
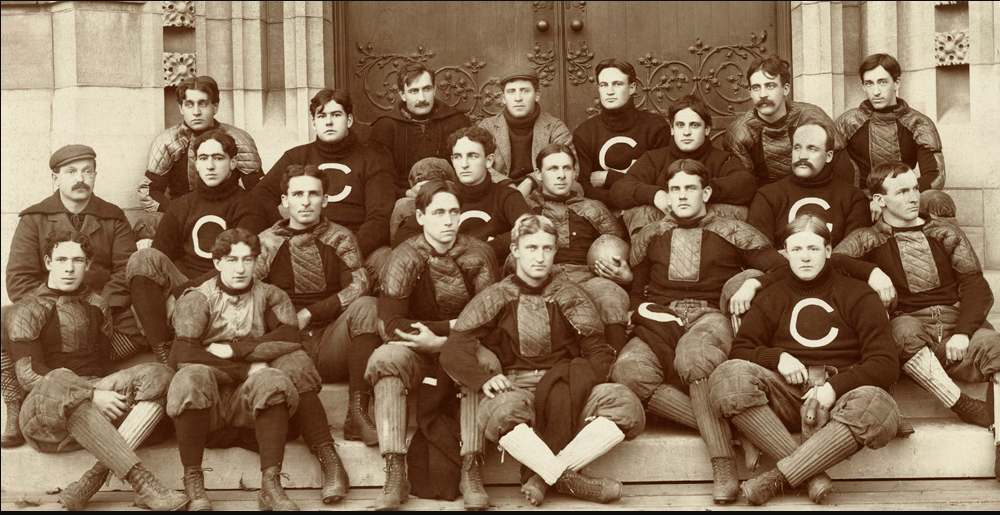
- Conference: Western Conference
- Record: 12–1 (3–1 Western)
- Head coach: Amos Alonzo Stagg (6th season)
- Captain: Clarence Herschberger
- Home stadium: Marshall Field

1897 Western Conference football standings
	Conf.					Overall
Team	W		L		T	W		L		T
Wisconsin $	3	–	0	–	0	9	–	1	–	0
Chicago	3	–	1	–	0	11	–	1	–	0
Michigan	2	–	1	–	0	6	–	1	–	1
Illinois	1	–	1	–	0	6	–	2	–	0
Purdue	1	–	2	–	0	5	–	3	–	1
Northwestern	0	–	2	–	0	5	–	3	–	0
Minnesota	0	–	3	–	0	4	–	4	–	0
$ – Conference champion

The 1897 Chicago Maroons football team was an American football team that represented the University of Chicago during the 1897 Western Conference football season. In their sixth season under head coach Amos Alonzo Stagg, the Maroons compiled a 12–1 record, finished in second place in the Western Conference with a 3–1 record against conference opponents, and outscored their opponents by a combined total of 353 to 68.

== Schedule ==
Date	Opponent	Site	Result	Attendance	Source
September 18	Hyde Park High School*	Marshall Field; Chicago, IL	W 14–0		
September 25	Englewood High School*	Marshall Field; Chicago, IL	W 21–0		
September 25	Hyde Park High School*	Marshall Field; Chicago, IL	W 11–0		
October 2	Monmouth (IL)*	Marshall Field; Chicago, IL	W 41–4		
October 9	Lake Forest*	Marshall Field; Chicago, IL	W 71–0		
October 13	Armour*	Marshall Field; Chicago, IL	W 24–0		
October 16	Beloit*	Marshall Field; Chicago, IL	W 39–6		
October 19	Morgan Park Academy*	Marshall Field; Chicago, IL	W 30–0		
October 23	Northwestern	Marshall Field; Chicago, IL	W 21–6	7,000	
October 30	at Illinois	Illinois Field; Champaign, IL	W 18–12		
November 6	Notre Dame*	Marshall Field; Chicago, IL	W 34–5		
November 13	Wisconsin	Marshall Field; Chicago, IL	L 8–23	7,000	
November 25	Michigan	Chicago Coliseum; Chicago, IL (rivalry)	W 21–12	10,000	
*Non-conference game

== Roster ==
Player	Position
Clarence Bert Herschberger (captain)	right halfback
Austin Craig Bowdish	right guard
Walter James Cavanagh	center
Maurice Gordon Clarke	quarterback
William Thaw Gardner	fullback
George Henry Garrey	left end
Ralph C. Hamill	right end
Walter Scott Kennedy	left halfback
Theron Ware Mortimer	left tackle
Kellogg Speed	left guard
Jonathan Edward Webb	right tackle
Norman Kendall Anderson	substitute
Harvey Fox	substitute
Theodore Hiram Patterson	substitute

- Head coach: Amos Alonzo Stagg (6th year at Chicago)
