= 1897 Northwestern Purple football team =

American college football season

1897 Northwestern Purple football
- Conference: Western Conference
- Record: 5–3 (0–2 Western)
- Head coach: Jesse Van Doozer (1st season)
- Captain: Joe Hunter
- Home stadium: Sheppard Field

1897 Western Conference football standings
	Conf.					Overall
Team	W		L		T	W		L		T
Wisconsin $	3	–	0	–	0	9	–	1	–	0
Chicago	3	–	1	–	0	11	–	1	–	0
Michigan	2	–	1	–	0	6	–	1	–	1
Illinois	1	–	1	–	0	6	–	2	–	0
Purdue	1	–	2	–	0	5	–	3	–	1
Northwestern	0	–	2	–	0	5	–	3	–	0
Minnesota	0	–	3	–	0	4	–	4	–	0
$ – Conference champion

The 1897 Northwestern Purple team represented Northwestern University during the 1897 Western Conference football season. In their first and only year under head coach Jesse Van Doozer, the Purple compiled a 5–3 record (0–2 against Western Conference opponents) and finished in sixth place in the Western Conference.

== Schedule ==
Date	Time	Opponent	Site	Result	Attendance	Source
September 29		Evanston High School*	Sheppard Field; Evanston, IL	W 6–0		
October 9	3:45 p.m.	at Beloit*	Keep Athletic Field; Beloit, WI	W 6–0	1,000	
October 16		Iowa*	Sheppard Field; Evanston, IL	L 6–12		
October 23		at Chicago	Marshall Field; Chicago, IL	L 6–21	7,000	
October 30		Chicago Physicians and Surgeons*	Sheppard Field; Evanston, IL	W 6–0		
November 6		Rush Medical*	Sheppard Field; Evanston, IL	W 14–0		
November 13		Northwestern alumni*	Sheppard Field; Evanston, IL	W 25–0		
November 25		Wisconsin	Sheppard Field; Evanston, IL	L 0–22		
*Non-conference game
