= 1897 Purdue Boilermakers football team =

American college football season

1897 Purdue Boilermakers football
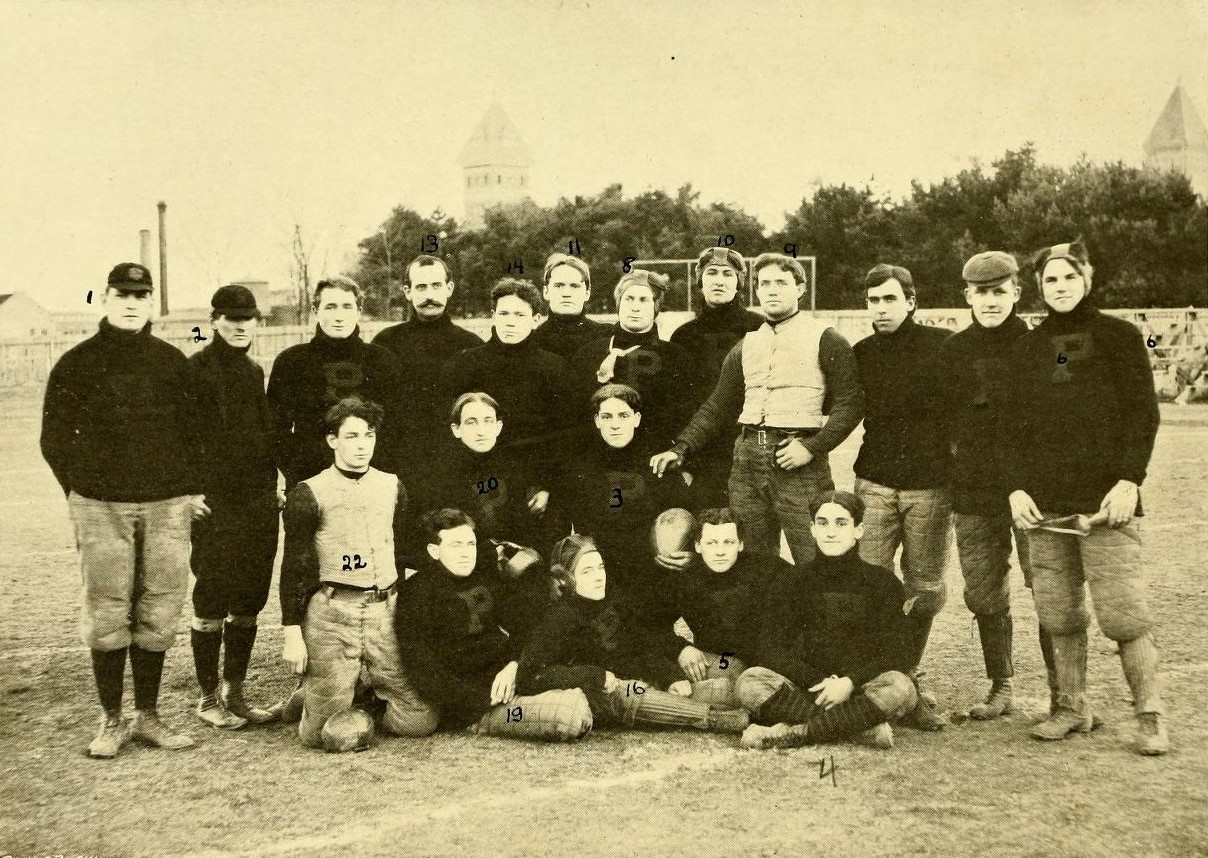
- Conference: Western Conference
- Record: 5–3–1 (1–2 Western)
- Head coach: William W. Church (1st season)
- Captain: William S. Moore
- Home stadium: Stuart Field

1897 Western Conference football standings
	Conf.					Overall
Team	W		L		T	W		L		T
Wisconsin $	3	–	0	–	0	9	–	1	–	0
Chicago	3	–	1	–	0	11	–	1	–	0
Michigan	2	–	1	–	0	6	–	1	–	1
Illinois	1	–	1	–	0	6	–	2	–	0
Purdue	1	–	2	–	0	5	–	3	–	1
Northwestern	0	–	2	–	0	5	–	3	–	0
Minnesota	0	–	3	–	0	4	–	4	–	0
$ – Conference champion

The 1897 Purdue Boilermakers football team was an American football team that represented Purdue University during the 1897 Western Conference football season. The Boilermakers compiled a 5–3–1 record but were outscored by their opponents by a total of 108 to 106 in their first season under head coach William W. Church. William S. Moore was the team captain.

== Schedule ==
Date	Opponent	Site	Result	Attendance	Source
October 2	Illinois State Normal*	Stuart Field; West Lafayette, IN	W 28–0		
October 9	Oberlin*	Stuart Field; West Lafayette, IN	L 6–22		
October 16	at DePauw*	Greencastle, IN	W 8–0		
October 23	at Illinois	Illinois Field; Champaign, IL (rivalry)	L 4–34		
October 30	Indiana*	Stuart Field; West Lafayette, IN (rivalry)	W 20–6		
November 6	at Michigan	Regents Field; Ann Arbor, MI	L 4–34		
November 13	Missouri*	Stuart Field; West Lafayette, IN	W 30–12		
November 20	Purdue alumni	Stuart Field; West Lafayette, IN	T 0–0	500	
November 25	Minnesota	Stuart Field; West Lafayette, IN	W 6–0		
*Non-conference game

== Players ==
- A. F. Alward - right tackle
- R. A. Bond, '00 - left tackle
- C. F. Breen, '98 - center
- C. E. Doan, '98 - fullback
- J. W. Esterline - fullback
- L. W. Goben, '98 - right halfback
- Herman Hall, '98 - right end
- Fred Herbold, '99 - left guard
- L. F. Johnson, '99 - left end
- W. S. Moore, '98 - captain and left halfback
- C. S. Sample, '99 - left tackle
- R. L. Sears, '98 - quarterback
- L. B. Webb, '98 - right tackle

== Coaching staff ==
- Head coach - William W. Church
- Manager - J. N. Moore, '98
