= 1897 Minnesota Golden Gophers football team =

American college football season

1897 Minnesota Golden Gophers football
- Conference: Western Conference
- Record: 4–4 (0–3 Western)
- Head coach: Alexander Jerrems (2nd season)
- Captain: Jack Harrison

1897 Western Conference football standings
	Conf.					Overall
Team	W		L		T	W		L		T
Wisconsin $	3	–	0	–	0	9	–	1	–	0
Chicago	3	–	1	–	0	11	–	1	–	0
Michigan	2	–	1	–	0	6	–	1	–	1
Illinois	1	–	1	–	0	6	–	2	–	0
Purdue	1	–	2	–	0	5	–	3	–	1
Northwestern	0	–	2	–	0	5	–	3	–	0
Minnesota	0	–	3	–	0	4	–	4	–	0
$ – Conference champion

The 1897 Minnesota Golden Gophers football team represented the University of Minnesota in the 1897 Western Conference football season. The 1897 season was the second and final season under head coach Alexander Jerrems. The season started out well, but the team lost its last four games including all three of its conference games. The Ariel reported that there was a general opinion that the team's difficulties were the result of poor management. Jerrems was not asked to return and changes were made to the rules governing athletics at the university—managers would no longer be chosen by the students.

== Schedule ==
Date	Opponent	Site	Result	Attendance	Source
September 25	South High School*	Minneapolis, MN	W 22–0		
October 2	at Macalester*	St. Paul, MN	W 26–0		
October 9	Carleton*	Minneapolis, MN	W 48–6		
October 16	Grinnell*	Minneapolis, MN	W 6–0		
October 23	at Iowa Agricultural*	State Field; Ames, IA	L 10–12		
October 30	Wisconsin	Minneapolis, MN (rivalry)	L 0–39		
November 13	vs. Michigan	Detroit Athletic Club Field; Detroit, MI (rivalry)	L 0–14	4,000	
November 25	at Purdue	Stuart Field; West Lafayette, IN	L 0–6		
*Non-conference game

== Roster ==
- Ends, Jack Harrison (captain and left end), C.R. Shipley (right end)
- Tackles, George A.E. Finlayson (left tackle), Claude Nicoulin (right tackle)
- Guard, A.M. Smith (left guard), A.K. Ingalls (right guard)
- Center, J.C. Winkjer
- Quarterback, George E. Cole
- Halfbacks, G.W. Evans (left half), S.W. Bagley (right half)
- Fullback, Harry C. Loomis
- Trainer, Edward "Dad" Moulton
- Coach, Alexander Jerrems.
