= William W. Church =

American football player and coach (1874–1966)

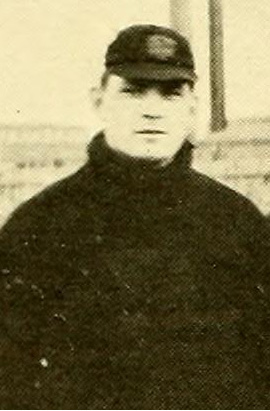
- Church cropped from 1897 Purdue team photo

Biographical details
- Born: December 17, 1874; Chicago, Illinois, U.S.
- Died: March 28, 1966 (aged 91); Oklahoma City, Oklahoma, U.S.
- Education: Princeton University (1897)

Playing career
- 1896: Princeton
- 1898: Duquesne Country and Athletic Club
- 1900: Homestead Library & Athletic Club
- Position: Tackle

Coaching career (HC unless noted)
- 1897: Purdue
- 1899, 1901: Georgetown

Head coaching record
- Overall: 13–8–4

Accomplishments and honors

Awards
- Consensus All-American (1896)

William Wells Church (December 17, 1874 – March 28, 1966) was an American football player and coach. A native of Chicago, he played college football at Princeton University, where he was selected as an All-American at tackle in 1896. He served as the head football coach at Purdue University for one season, in 1897, and at Georgetown University for two seasons, in 1899 and 1901, compiling a career college football record of 5–3–1. Church participated in early professional football: He played tackle for the Duquesne Country and Athletic Club in 1898 and the Homestead Library & Athletic Club in 1900, also coaching the latter team. He married Mary Myrtle Brock in 1902.

He later resided in Oklahoma City, Oklahoma, where he died in 1966.

== Head coaching record ==
Year	Team	Overall	Conference	Standing	Bowl/playoffs
Purdue Boilermakers (Western Conference) (1897)
1897	Purdue	5–3–1	1–2	5th	
Purdue:		5–3–1	1–2		
Georgetown Blue and Gray (Independent) (1899)
1899	Georgetown	5–2–1			
Georgetown Blue and Gray (Independent) (1901)
1901	Georgetown	3–3–2			
Georgetown:		8–5–3			
Total:		13–8–4			
