= Jerry Riordan =

American football player and coach (1873–1936)

Biographical details
- Born: February 17, 1873; Trenton, Wisconsin, U.S.
- Died: January 20, 1936 (aged 63); St. Paul, Minnesota, U.S.

Playing career
- 1895–1897: Wisconsin
- 1900: Wisconsin
- Position: Guard

Coaching career (HC unless noted)
- 1899: Wisconsin (line)
- 1901: Marquette
- 1903: Marquette

Head coaching record
- Overall: 11–1–1

Jeremiah P. Riordan (February 17, 1873 – January 20, 1936) was an American college football player and coach.

Riordan was born in Trenton, Wisconsin and attended school in West Bend. Riordan was the third head football at Marquette University and he held that position for two seasons, in 1901 and 1903.

Riordan died suddenly of an "attack of heart disease" at St. Paul, Minnesota in 1936. He was buried at Madison, Wisconsin.

== Head coaching record ==
Year	Team	Overall	Conference	Standing	Bowl/playoffs
Marquette Blue and Gold (Independent) (1901)
1901	Marquette	4–0–1			
Marquette Blue and Gold (Independent) (1903)
1903	Marquette	7–1			
Marquette:		11–1–1			
Total:		11–1–1			
