= Alexander Jerrems =

American football player and coach (1874–1948)

Biographical details
- Born: August 3, 1874; Sydney, Australia
- Died: September 21, 1948 (aged 74); Los Angeles, California, U.S.

Playing career

Football
- 1893–1895: Yale

Baseball
- 1896: Yale
- Positions: Fullback, halfback (football)

Coaching career (HC unless noted)

Football
- 1896–1897: Minnesota
- 1898: Christian Brothers College HS (MO)

Head coaching record
- Overall: 12–6 (college)

Alexander Nicoll Jerrems (August 3, 1874 – September 21, 1948) was an American football player and coach. He played college football for the Yale Bulldogs football teams from 1893 to 1895 and coached the Minnesota Golden Gophers football teams from 1896 to 1897.

== Early years ==
Jerrems was born in Sydney, Australia. While still an infant, he moved with his parents to London, England. After three years in London, the family moved to Philadelphia, and after two years there, settled in Chicago. He attended preparatory school education at The Hill School in Pottstown, Pennsylvania, and while there played football. His father, William George Jerrems, was the president of Nicoll the Tailor, Inc. (The "Nicoll the Tailor" chain operated nationwide from San Francisco to New York.) His mother was Mary (Nicoll) Jerrems.

== Yale ==
From 1893 to 1896, Jerrems attended the Sheffield Scientific School at Yale University. He played college football for the Yale Bulldogs football teams from 1893 to 1895. He played on his class team in 1893 and also served as a substitute for the varsity team. In 1894, he played halfback for the varsity, and in his final year, he was the starting fullback for the undefeated 1895 Yale team that compiled a 13–0–2 record. On November 23, 1895, he helped lead Yale to a 20–10 victory over Princeton before a crowd of 30,000 at the Polo Grounds in New York City. Jerrems handled the punting duties, blocked a kick, and scored a touchdown in the game. He also played college baseball at Yale as a center fielder.

== Minnesota ==
In April 1896, Jerrems received an offer to coach the Minnesota Golden Gophers football team. After several weeks of negotiating a salary, Jerrems was engaged in May 1896, at age 21, and with a salary reported to be $1,200. He served as the head football coach at the University of Minnesota for the 1896 and 1897 Golden Gophers seasons, leading the team to a 12–6 overall record including 1–5 in Big Ten Conference play. On October 31, 1896, Jerrems also played at the fullback position for the Ex-Collegians team that played against his Minnesota squad. He was the only Minnesota football coach in the 1890s to coach for more than one season.

== Later years ==
In 1898, Jerrems served as a football coach at Christian Brothers College High School in St. Louis.

In 1900, he married Mary Emlen Bell. They had three children: Marabel, born in 1901, Alexander Nicoll, Jr., born in 1903, and Hellen Virginia, born in 1905. All three children were raised in Chicago.

He worked for a time with his family's "Nicoll The Tailor" business in Chicago. He was secretary and director of the business in 1912.

== Head coaching record ==
=== College ===
Year	Team	Overall	Conference	Standing	Bowl/playoffs
Minnesota Golden Gophers (Western Conference) (1896–1897)
1896	Minnesota	8–2	1–2	5th	
1897	Minnesota	4–4	0–3	7th	
Minnesota:		12–6	1–5		
Total:		12–6			
