= Clarence Herschberger =

American football player and coach (1876–1936)

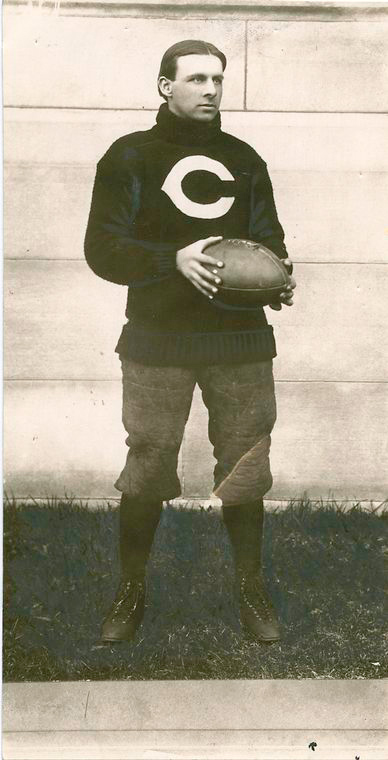

Biographical details
- Born: July 24, 1876; Peoria, Illinois, U.S.
- Died: December 14, 1936 (aged 60); Chicago, Illinois, U.S.

Playing career
- 1894–1898: Chicago
- Positions: Fullback, placekicker

Coaching career (HC unless noted)
- 1899: Chicago (assistant)
- 1902–1904: Lake Forest

Head coaching record
- Overall: 13–10–2

Accomplishments and honors

Awards
- Consensus All-American (1898)
- College Football Hall of Fame; Inducted in 1970 (profile)

Clarence Bertram "Herschie" Herschberger (July 24, 1876 – December 14, 1936) was an American football player and coach. He played college football as a fullback, punter and placekicker at University of Chicago from 1896 to 1898. He became the first western player to be selected as a first-team All-American, in 1898. Herschberger served as the head football coach at Lake Forest College from 1902 to 1904, compiling a record of 13–10–2. He was inducted into the College Football Hall of Fame as a player in 1970.

== Athlete at Chicago ==
A native of Peoria, Illinois, Herschberger enrolled at the University of Chicago in 1894 where he became an honor student and graduated with Phi Beta Kappa honors. He also earned a total of 13 varsity letters in track, football and baseball. He played for Amos Alonzo Stagg's football teams from 1894 to 1898 and was one of the first of the great football stars developed by Stagg. He was captain of the 1897 Chicago team. Although he weighed only 158 pounds, Herschberger played fullback and was the kicker for Stagg's Maroons. He was known for making key plays in big games. In 1896, Herschberger picked up a fumbled ball in a game against the Michigan Wolverines and ran it back for a touchdown to secure Chicago's victory by a score of 7–6. In 1898, the Chicago football team played the Penn Quakers and lost 23–11, bringing national attention to Herschberger and Stagg's football team. Bob Sensenderfer of the Philadelphia Bulletin writes "I saw Herschberger play in that game. He sure could kick but it didn't do much good, for his ends couldn't get down to cover them and Penn's Johnny Gardiner got 'em back pretty well every time." Famed football man Walter Camp saw the game and wrote, "Against Penn this year, Herschberger exhibited the best all-around kicking of the season; punting, place-kicking and drop-kicking with accuracy and facility." After the 1898 season, Camp chose Herschberger as the first-team fullback for his 1898 College Football All-America Team—the first player from a western school to be so honored.

In the years when Herschberger played, Stagg emphasized the kicking game. Stagg's goal was to move the ball inside the opponents' 40-yard line. Stagg then turned to Herschberger who established a record for field goals, which were then worth five points—the same as a touchdown. Herschberger was also considered an excellent punter, making him a key asset in Stagg's strategy of maximizing field position. The Maroons had a record of 35–8 during Herschberger's time with the team.

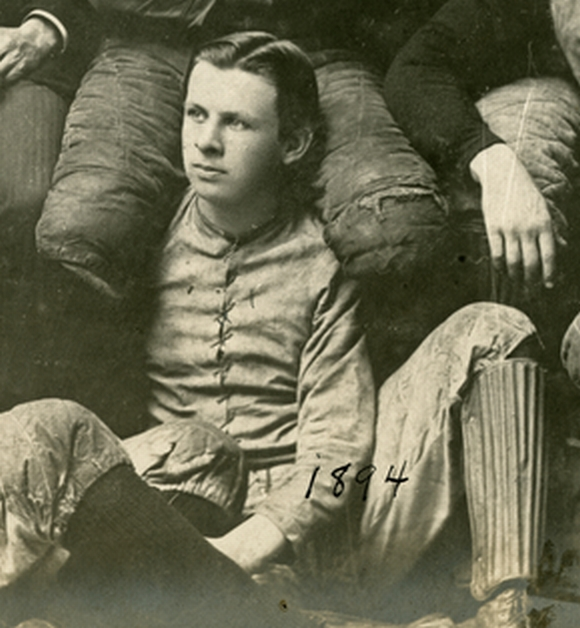
Clarence Bert Herschberger, University of Chicago Men's Football Team, 1894

Herschberger has also been credited with a number of innovations in the sport. He was believed to be the first player to kick spiral punts, and Stagg credited him as being the first to use the Statue of Liberty play. He has also been credited as the first player to do an onside kick and most likely the first player to ever receive an x-ray for an injury.

There are accounts that Herschberger challenged Chicago's quarterback Walter S. Kennedy to an eating contest before a football game with the Wisconsin Badgers. After eating 13 eggs on the morning of the game, Herschberger was unable to play due to gastritis. Chicago lost the game 23–8, leading Stagg to say, "We weren't beaten by 11 Badgers. We were beaten by 13 eggs."

He was inducted into the College Football Hall of Fame in 1970.

== Later years ==
After graduating from the University of Chicago, Herschberger worked as a football coach at Chicago, Lake Forest Academy, and Lake Forest College in Lake Forest, Illinois. From 1907 to 1921, he lived in New York where he was associated with financier Frank Vanderlip. He later returned to Chicago where he worked in the real estate business.

In December 1936, Herschberger was found dead in the gas-filled basement of his home on W. 64th Street in Chicago His body was found by his 19-year-old daughter, Ruth. Herschberger had attached a rubber hose to a laundry gas burner and had inhaled illuminating gas. His death at age 60 was a suicide arising from his despondency over ill health. His widow attributed the act to a nervous breakdown. Herschberger retired from the real estate business after suffering a nervous breakdown four years before he died, and had suffered from heart disease.

Herschberger was survived by his wife, Grace Herschberger, two daughters (Ruth and Harriet) and two sons (Clarence Jr., and John).

== Head coaching record ==
Year	Team	Overall	Conference	Standing	Bowl/playoffs
Lake Forest Foresters (Independent) (1902–1904)
1902	Lake Forest	4–4–1			
1903	Lake Forest	6–1			
1904	Lake Forest	3–5–1			
Lake Forest:		13–10–2			
Total:		13–10–2			
