= 1911 Michigan Agricultural Aggies football team =

American college football season

1911 Michigan Agricultural Aggies football
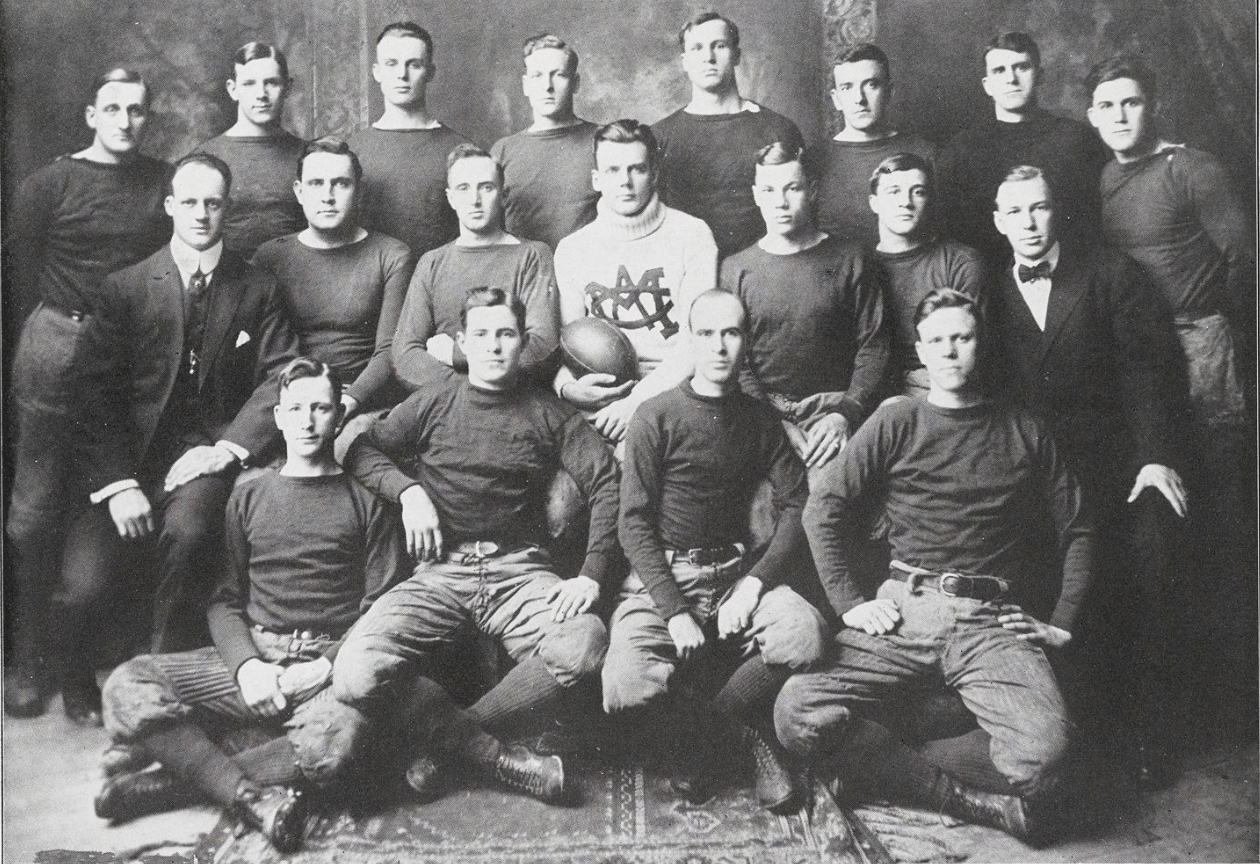
- Conference: Independent
- Record: 5–1
- Head coach: John Macklin (1st season)
- Captain: Fred A. Stone
- Home stadium: College Field

1911 Midwestern college football independents records
| | Conf. | | | Overall |
| Team | W | L | T | W | | L | | T |
|---|---|---|---|---|---|---|---|---|
| Marquette | | – | | 7 | – | 0 | – | 2 |
| Notre Dame | | – | | 6 | – | 0 | – | 2 |
| Fairmount | | – | | 7 | – | 1 | – | 0 |
| South Dakota | | – | | 7 | – | 1 | – | 0 |
| Michigan Agricultural | | – | | 5 | – | 1 | – | 0 |
| Northern Illinois State | | – | | 8 | – | 2 | – | 1 |
| Saint Louis | | – | | 6 | – | 1 | – | 1 |
| Lake Forest | | – | | 5 | – | 1 | – | 1 |
| Mount Union | | – | | 7 | – | 2 | – | 0 |
| Michigan | | – | | 5 | – | 1 | – | 2 |
| North Dakota Agricultural | | – | | 3 | – | 1 | – | 0 |
| St. Viator | | – | | 4 | – | 2 | – | 0 |
| Haskell | | – | | 4 | – | 2 | – | 3 |
| Iowa State Teachers | | – | | 3 | – | 2 | – | 1 |
| Ohio Northern | | – | | 5 | – | 4 | – | 0 |
| Detroit | | – | | 4 | – | 4 | – | 0 |
| Central Michigan | | – | | 3 | – | 3 | – | 0 |
| South Dakota State | | – | | 4 | – | 4 | – | 0 |
| St. Mary's (OH) | | – | | 3 | – | 3 | – | 1 |
| Wabash | | – | | 3 | – | 3 | – | 1 |
| Buchtel | | – | | 3 | – | 4 | – | 1 |
| Butler | | – | | 3 | – | 4 | – | 1 |
| Carthage | | – | | 3 | – | 4 | – | 1 |
| Doane | | – | | 3 | – | 4 | – | 0 |
| Michigan State Normal | | – | | 3 | – | 4 | – | 0 |
| Heidelberg | | – | | 2 | – | 3 | – | 1 |
| Western State Normal | | – | | 2 | – | 3 | – | 0 |
| Loyola (IL) | | – | | 2 | – | 5 | – | 0 |

The 1911 Michigan Agricultural Aggies football team represented Michigan Agricultural College (MAC) as an independent during the 1911 college football season. In their first year under head coach John Macklin, the Aggies compiled a 5–1 record and outscored their opponents 93 to 30.

== Schedule ==
| Date | Opponent | Site | Result |
|---|---|---|---|
| October 7 | Alma | College Field; East Lansing, MI | W 12–0 |
| October 14 | Michigan | College Field; East Lansing, MI (rivalry) | L 3–15 |
| October 28 | Olivet | College Field; East Lansing, MI | W 29–3 |
| November 4 | at DePauw | Greencastle, IN | W 6–0 |
| November 11 | Mount Union | College Field; East Lansing, MI | W 26–6 |
| November 30 | Wabash | College Field; East Lansing, MI | W 17–6 |

== Game summaries ==
=== Michigan ===
Michigan at Michigan Agricultural

| Team | 1 | 2 | 3 | 4 | Total |
|---|---|---|---|---|---|
| • Michigan | 0 | 0 | 3 | 12 | 15 |
| Michigan Agricultural | 0 | 0 | 3 | 0 | 3 |

- Date: October 14, 1911
- Location: College Field
  East Lansing, MI
- Game start: 2:30 p.m.
- Game attendance: 5,000
- Referee: Lt. Horatio B. Hackett (Army)

On October 14, 1911, the Aggies lost to Michigan by a 15 to 3 score in front of 5,000 spectators at College Field in East Lansing, Michigan. It was the sixth game in the Michigan - Michigan State football rivalry, and Michigan had a record of 4-0-1 in the five prior meetings, outscoring the Aggies by a combined total of 210 to 0. The 1911 game was the first loss by M.A.C. on their home field.

Michigan threatened to score in the first quarter, but one drive was stopped when the Aggies' intercepted a pass at their own 10-yard line. On the next drive, Michigan took the ball to the Aggies' 15-yard line, but a field goal attempt by Frederick L. Conklin was unsuccessful. In the second quarter, another Michigan drive took the ball to the M.A.C. three-yard line, but Michigan was unable to score, and the Aggies took over on downs. Walter Eckersall was the umpire and also covered the game for the Chicago Daily Tribune. Eckersall wrote: "That Michigan met a Tartar in a team which held Yost's eleven to a 0 to 0 score in the first two periods and was the first to register a score . . . cannot be questioned. Time after time the Wolverines carried the ball inside the local's fifteen yard line only to be checked by a slow defense."

In the third quarter, the Aggies took the lead when their left halfback Hill kicked a field goal from the 35-yard line. Shortly thereafter, a 30-yard gain by Otto Carpell helped set the stage for a field goal by Conklin from the 20-yard line. In the fourth quarter, Michigan scored two touchdowns. The first came on a 63-yard drive that included a 30-yard gain on a pass from fullback George C. Thomson to Stanfield Wells. Wells finished the drive with a five-yard touchdown run, and Frederick L. Conklin kicked the extra point. After the touchdown, Thomson returned M.A.C.'s kickoff 55 yards to the Aggies' 48-yard line. Thomson then gained 35 yards on a running play for Michigan's second touchdown. Conklin kicked the extra point. Thomson also handled punting for Michigan, and one of his punts went 70 yards. The game was played in ten-minute quarters.
