= 1911 Notre Dame Fighting Irish football team =

American college football season

1911 Notre Dame Fighting Irish football
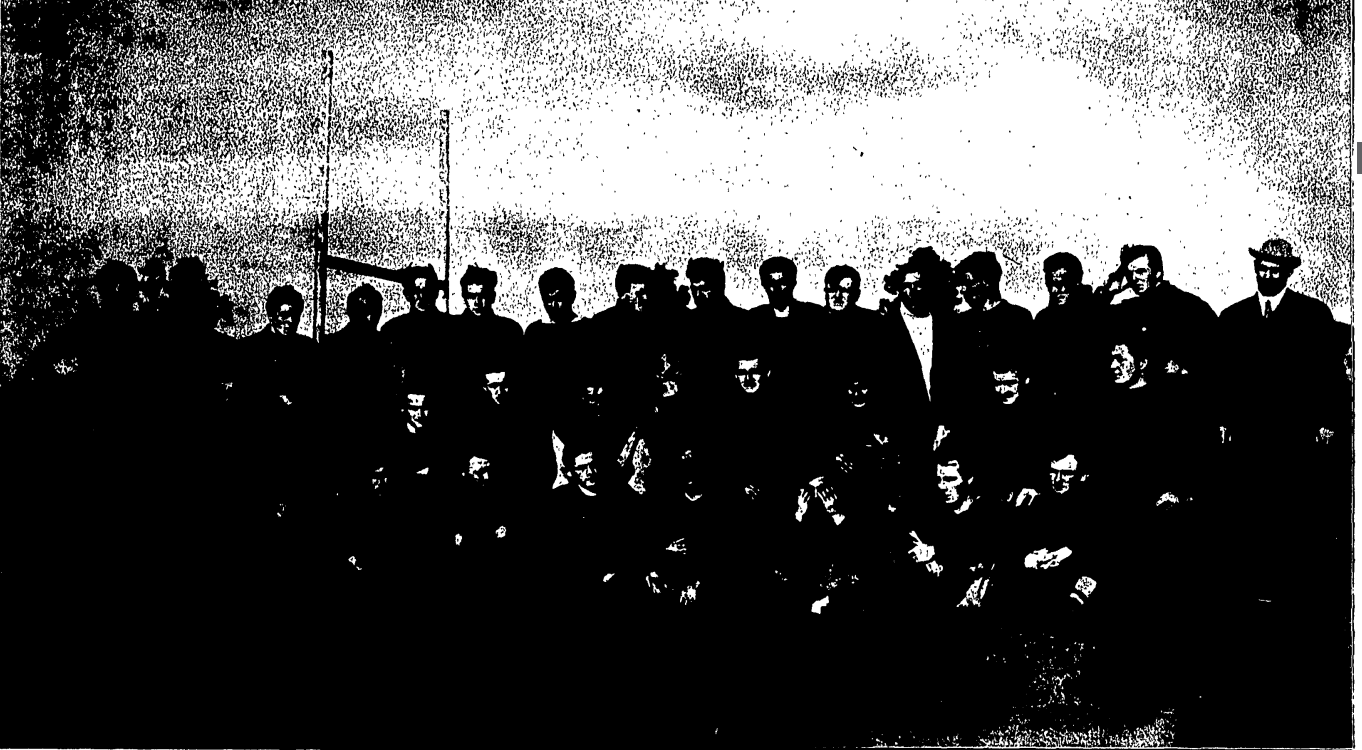
- Conference: Independent
- Record: 6–0–2
- Head coach: John L. Marks (1st season)
- Captain: Luke Kelly
- Home stadium: Cartier Field

1911 Midwestern college football independents records
	Conf.			Overall
Team	W	L	T	W		L		T
Marquette		–		7	–	0	–	2
Notre Dame		–		6	–	0	–	2
Fairmount		–		7	–	1	–	0
South Dakota		–		7	–	1	–	0
Michigan Agricultural		–		5	–	1	–	0
Northern Illinois State		–		8	–	2	–	1
Saint Louis		–		6	–	1	–	1
Lake Forest		–		5	–	1	–	1
Mount Union		–		7	–	2	–	0
Michigan		–		5	–	1	–	2
North Dakota Agricultural		–		3	–	1	–	0
St. Viator		–		4	–	2	–	0
Haskell		–		4	–	2	–	3
Iowa State Teachers		–		3	–	2	–	1
Ohio Northern		–		5	–	4	–	0
Detroit		–		4	–	4	–	0
Central Michigan		–		3	–	3	–	0
South Dakota State		–		4	–	4	–	0
St. Mary's (OH)		–		3	–	3	–	1
Wabash		–		3	–	3	–	1
Buchtel		–		3	–	4	–	1
Butler		–		3	–	4	–	1
Carthage		–		3	–	4	–	1
Doane		–		3	–	4	–	0
Michigan State Normal		–		3	–	4	–	0
Heidelberg		–		2	–	3	–	1
Western State Normal		–		2	–	3	–	0
Loyola (IL)		–		2	–	5	–	0

The 1911 Notre Dame Fighting Irish football team was an American football team that represented the University of Notre Dame as an independent during the 1911 college football season. In their first year under head coach John L. Marks, the Irish compiled a 6–0–2 record, shut out six of eight opponents, and outscored all opponents by a total of 222 to 9. They played scoreless tie games against Pittsburgh and Marquette. The only points allowed by Notre Dame were a touchdown by Ohio Northern in the season opener and a field goal by Wabash.

Key players included quarterback Gus Dorais, end Knute Rockne, fullback Ray Eichenlaub, halfback Alfred Bergman, and tackles George Philbrook and Luke Kelly. Kelly was also the team captain.

The team played its home games at Cartier Field in Notre Dame, Indiana.

== Schedule ==
Date	Opponent	Site	Result	Attendance	Source
October 7	Ohio Northern	Cartier Field; Notre Dame, IN	W 32–6		
October 14	St. Viator	Cartier Field; Notre Dame, IN	W 43–0		
October 21	Butler	Cartier Field; Notre Dame, IN	W 27–0		
October 28	Loyola (IL)	Cartier Field; Notre Dame, IN	W 80–0		
November 4	at Pittsburgh	Forbes Field; Pittsburgh, PA (rivalry)	T 0–0	10,000	
November 11	St. Bonaventure	Cartier Field; Notre Dame, IN	W 34–0		
November 20	at Wabash	Crawfordsville, IN	W 6–3		
November 30	at Marquette	Milwaukee, WI	T 0–0		

== Personnel ==
=== Players ===
- A. "Heinie" Berger, halfback
- Alfred Bergman, halfback
- Charles Crowley, end
- Gus Dorais, quarterback
- Ray Eichenlaub, fullback
- Albert Feeney, center
- E. J. Harvat, guard
- K. Jones, fullback
- Bill Kelleher, halfback
- Luke Kelley, captain and tackle
- Torgus Oaas, guard
- George Philbrook, tackle
- Joseph Pliska, halfback
- Knute Rockne, end

=== Coaching staff ===
- Head coach - John L. Marks
- Assistant coach - Don Hamilton
- Manager - John Murphy
- Assistant manager - William Cotter
- Trainer - Bert Maris
