= 1911 Michigan Wolverines football team =

American college football season

1911 Michigan Wolverines football
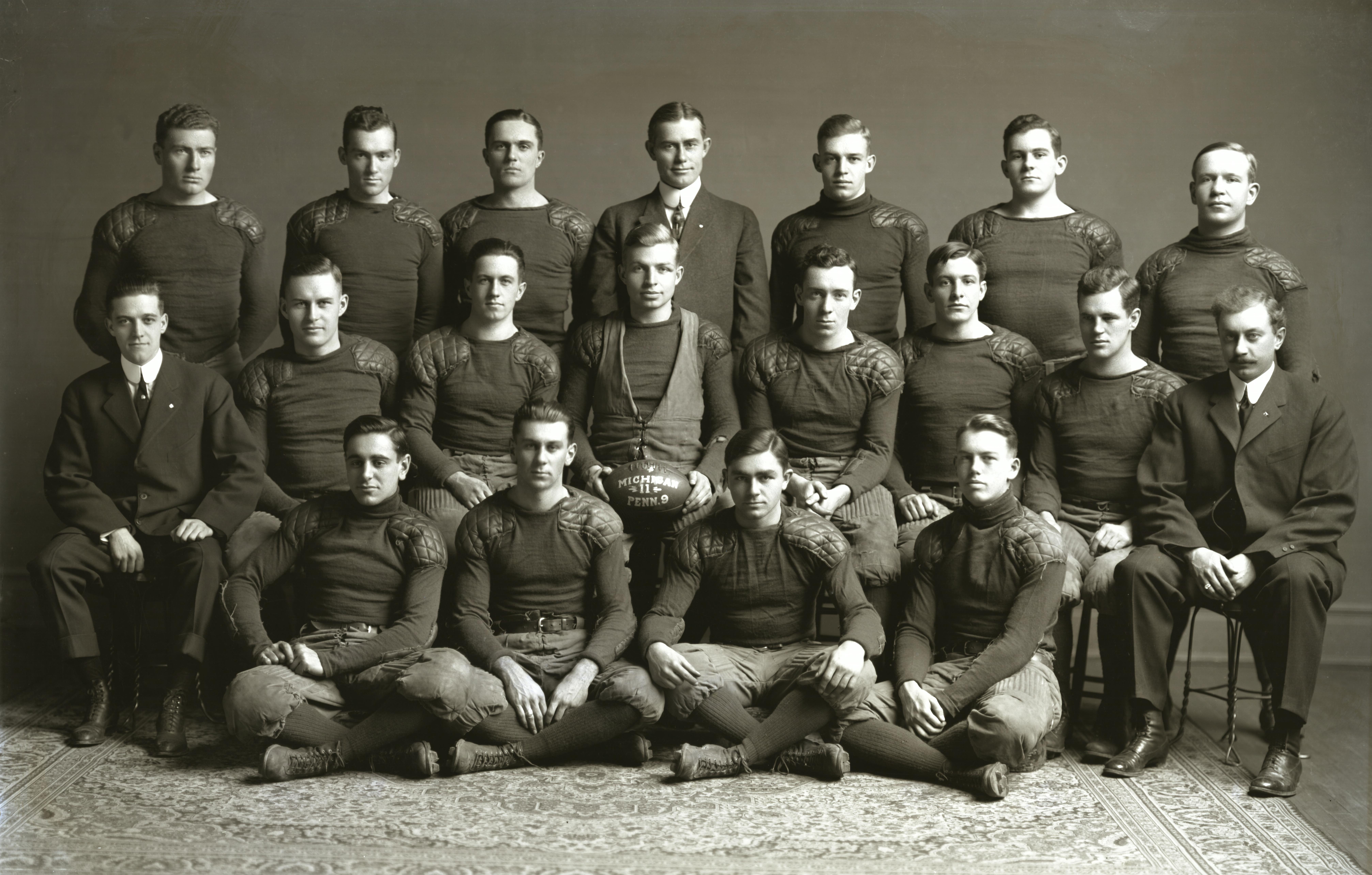
- Conference: Independent
- Record: 5–1–2
- Head coach: Fielding H. Yost (11th season)
- Captain: Frederick L. Conklin
- Home stadium: Ferry Field

Uniform
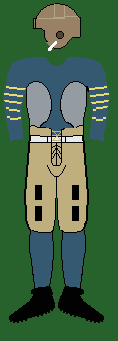

1911 Midwestern college football independents records
	Conf.			Overall
Team	W	L	T	W		L		T
Marquette		–		7	–	0	–	2
Notre Dame		–		6	–	0	–	2
Fairmount		–		7	–	1	–	0
South Dakota		–		7	–	1	–	0
Michigan Agricultural		–		5	–	1	–	0
Northern Illinois State		–		8	–	2	–	1
Saint Louis		–		6	–	1	–	1
Lake Forest		–		5	–	1	–	1
Mount Union		–		7	–	2	–	0
Michigan		–		5	–	1	–	2
North Dakota Agricultural		–		3	–	1	–	0
St. Viator		–		4	–	2	–	0
Haskell		–		4	–	2	–	3
Iowa State Teachers		–		3	–	2	–	1
Ohio Northern		–		5	–	4	–	0
Detroit		–		4	–	4	–	0
Central Michigan		–		3	–	3	–	0
South Dakota State		–		4	–	4	–	0
St. Mary's (OH)		–		3	–	3	–	1
Wabash		–		3	–	3	–	1
Buchtel		–		3	–	4	–	1
Butler		–		3	–	4	–	1
Carthage		–		3	–	4	–	1
Doane		–		3	–	4	–	0
Michigan State Normal		–		3	–	4	–	0
Heidelberg		–		2	–	3	–	1
Western State Normal		–		2	–	3	–	0
Loyola (IL)		–		2	–	5	–	0

The 1911 Michigan Wolverines football team represented the University of Michigan as an independent during the 1911 college football season. The team's head coach was Fielding H. Yost in his 11th season at Michigan. The Wolverines compiled a record of 5–1–2 and outscored their opponents 90 to 38.

After beginning the season with four consecutive wins, the team was stricken with multiple injuries and won only one of its final four games, an 11–9 victory over Penn in the annual rivalry game with the Quakers. The team's sole loss was to Cornell in a game in which halfback Jimmy Craig, quarterback Shorty McMillan, and lineman Miller Pontius were all sidelined with injuries. As the injuries mounted, the Detroit Free Press quipped in late November 1911 that Michigan could claim the world championship of injuries, having had more injuries in 1911 than ever before in the program's history.

Only one Michigan player received All-American honors in 1911. Stanfield Wells, who played three games at right end and three at right halfback, was selected as a first-team All-American by The New York Globe and Henry L. Williams. Two other players on the 1911 team, Pontius and Craig, received All-American honors in 1912 or 1913.

Four Michigan players were recognized as first-team All-Western players. They were Wells, team captain Frederick L. Conklin, fullback and punter George "Bottles" Thomson, and Craig. Thomson was also the team's high scorer with seven touchdowns in seven games for a total of 35 points.

== Schedule ==
Date	Opponent	Site	Result	Attendance
October 7	Case	Ferry Field; Ann Arbor, MI	W 24–0	3,500
October 14	at Michigan Agricultural	College Field; East Lansing, MI (rivalry)	W 15–3	
October 21	Ohio State	Ferry Field; Ann Arbor, MI (rivalry)	W 19–0	5,000
October 28	Vanderbilt	Ferry Field; Ann Arbor, MI	W 9–8	
November 4	Syracuse	Ferry Field; Ann Arbor, MI	T 6–6	
November 11	at Cornell	Percy Field; Ithaca, NY	L 0–6	
November 18	Penn	Ferry Field; Ann Arbor, MI	W 11–9	17,000
November 25	at Nebraska	Nebraska Field; Lincoln, NE	T 6–6	

== Season summary ==
=== Preseason ===
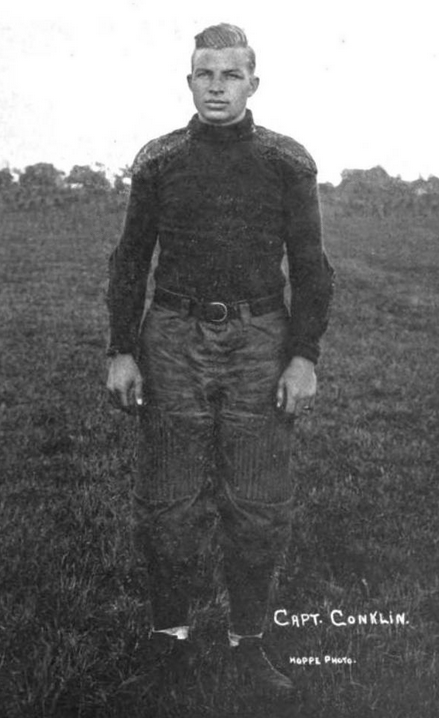
Team captain Frederick L. Conklin

The 1911 team featured several players who had been starters on the undefeated 1910 Michigan Wolverines football team, including team captain Frederick L. Conklin, Thomas A. Bogle, Jr., Stanfield Wells, Shorty McMillan, and George C. Thomson. The team also included a promising group of sophomores who had played on the freshman team in 1910, including Jimmy Craig, Miller Pontius, and George C. Paterson. However, with games against Ohio State, Vanderbilt, Cornell, Penn, and Nebraska, the team faced "one of the hardest schedules ever arranged for the Wolverines."

The team conducted its preliminary training camp at Whitmore Lake, Michigan, beginning on August 19, 1911. Letters were sent inviting 23 prospects to Whitmore Lake. Pre-season training resumed at Whitmore Lake on September 19 and continued through September 29.

Before the season began, several press reports noted that, with five veteran players returning from the 1910 championship team, head coach Fielding H. Yost was optimistic. The Michigan Alumnus wrote:

"The famous Yost smile is broader this season than ever before. The famous 'Hurry Up,' in all his years of coaching experience, has never been so optimistic over Michigan's chances for a victorious season as he is this year -- at least, not since 1905."

Much of the pre-season had been spent focusing on the development of a quarterback to replace Shorty McMillan, who had announced in late July that he intended to give up college and accept a position in his father's business. However, Coach Yost ultimately persuaded McMillan to return to Michigan, and he joined the team on October 10, 1911—shortly after the first game of the season. The team also lost the services of Arthur Cornwell, who had been selected by Yost as the All-Western center in 1910, due to academic ineligibility.

=== Case ===
Week 1: Case at Michigan

Team	1	2	3	4	Total
Case	0	0	0	0	0
• Michigan	6	6	0	12	24

- Date: October 7, 1911
- Location: Ferry Field
  Ann Arbor, MI
- Game attendance: 3,448
- Referee: Ralph Hoagland (Princeton)

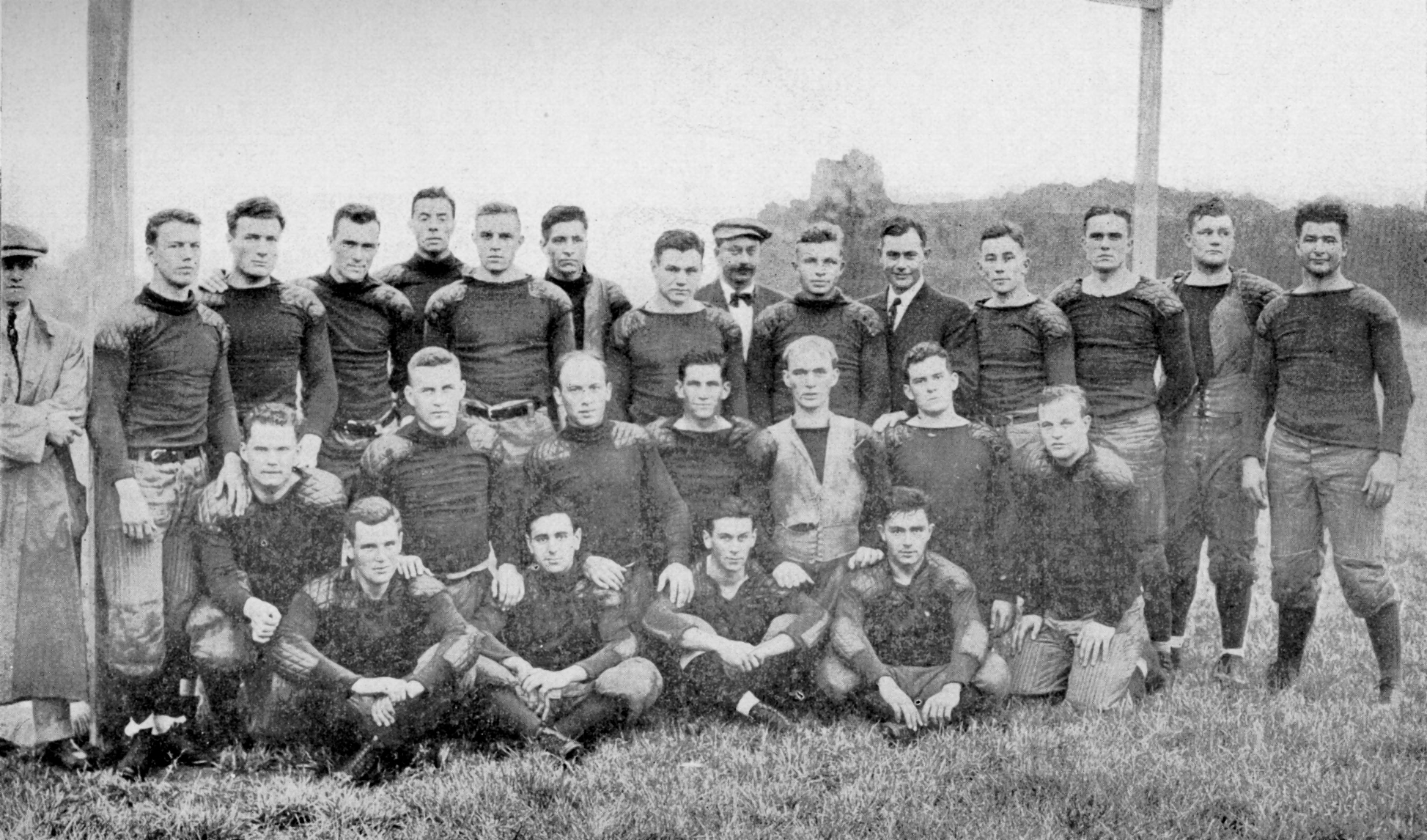
Team portrait taken by A. S. Lyndon, September 1911

On October 7, 1911, Michigan opened its season at Ferry Field with a 24–0 victory over the team from Cleveland's Case Scientific School. The game was the 15th meeting between the two programs, and Michigan had won 13 of the 14 prior games. The teams had played to a tie in 1910.

Michigan scored four touchdowns (valued at five points under 1911 rules) and kicked four extra points in the game. Fullback George C. "Bottles" Thomson scored all four touchdowns for Michigan, including two touchdowns in the fourth quarter on runs of three and 25 yards. Team captain and left tackle Frederick L. Conklin kicked all four extra points. On defense, Michigan held Case to one first down. Sophomore Jimmy Craig appeared in his first game and started at the quarterback position. The Detroit Free Press called a 20-yard punt return by Craig "the prettiest play of the game" and opined that Craig "showed real ability at the art of dodging and straight-arming eluding no less than five would-be tacklers before anyone could down him." No serious injuries were sustained in the Case game, and the Free Press noted that the team was showing "remarkable early season speed."

The game was played in 10-minute quarters. Michigan's lineup against Case (starters listed first) was Garrels (left end), Conklin (left tackle), Bogle (left guard), Paterson (center), Allmendinger and Quinn (right guard), Pontius (right tackle), Wells (right end), Craig and Picard (quarterback), Torbet and Herrington (left halfback), Huebel, Wenner and Roblee (right halfback), and Thomson (fullback).

=== At Michigan Agricultural ===
Week 2: Michigan at Michigan Agricultural

Team	1	2	3	4	Total
• Michigan	0	0	3	12	15
Michigan Agricultural	0	0	3	0	3

- Date: October 14, 1911
- Location: College Field
  East Lansing, MI
- Game start: 2:30 p.m.
- Game attendance: 5,000
- Referee: Horatio B. Hackett

In the second week of the season, Michigan defeated Michigan Agricultural College by a 15–3 score in front of 5,000 spectators at College Field in East Lansing, Michigan. It was the sixth game in the Michigan - Michigan State football rivalry, and Michigan had a record of 4-0-1 in the five prior meetings, outscoring the Aggies by a combined total of 210 to 0. The 1911 game was the first loss by M.A.C. on their home field.

Michigan threatened to score in the first quarter, but one drive was stopped when the Aggies' intercepted a pass at their own 10-yard line. On the next drive, Michigan took the ball to the Aggies' 15-yard line, but a field goal attempt by Frederick L. Conklin was unsuccessful. In the second quarter, another Michigan drive took the ball to the M.A.C. three-yard line, but Michigan was unable to score, and the Aggies took over on downs. Walter Eckersall was the umpire and also covered the game for the Chicago Daily Tribune. Eckersall wrote: "That Michigan met a Tartar in a team which held Yost's eleven to a 0 to 0 score in the first two periods and was the first to register a score . . . cannot be questioned. Time after time the Wolverines carried the ball inside the local's fifteen yard line only to be checked by a slow defense."

In the third quarter, the Aggies took the lead when their left halfback Hill kicked a field goal from the 35-yard line. Shortly thereafter, a 30-yard gain by Otto Carpell helped set the stage for a field goal by Conklin from the 20-yard line. In the fourth quarter, Michigan scored two touchdowns. The first came on a 63-yard drive that included a 30-yard gain on a pass from fullback George C. Thomson to Stanfield Wells. Wells finished the drive with a five-yard touchdown run, and Frederick L. Conklin kicked the extra point. After the touchdown, Thomson returned M.A.C.'s kickoff 55 yards to the Aggies' 48-yard line. Thomson then gained 35 yards on a running play for Michigan's second touchdown. Conklin kicked the extra point. Thomson also handled punting for Michigan, and one of his punts went 70 yards.

After the game, Walter Eckersall concluded: "Michigan has a team which is going to be mighty hard to beat as soon as Yost perfects the team play. The Michigan mentor has the weight, speed, and cleverness for the development of another strong team."

The game was played in ten-minute quarters. Michigan's lineup against the Aggies was Garrels (left end), Conklin (left tackle), Bogle (left guard), Paterson (center), Allmendinger and Quinn (right guard), Pontius (right tackle), Wells (right end), Craig and McMillan (quarterback), Torbet, Herrington and Craig (left halfback), Carpell (right halfback), and Thomson (fullback). Walter Eckersall was the umpire.

=== Ohio State ===
Week 3: Ohio State at Michigan

Team	1	2	3	4	Total
Ohio State	0	0	0	0	0
• Michigan	0	5	9	5	19

- Date: October 21, 1911
- Location: Ferry Field
  Ann Arbor, MI
- Game start: 2:45 p.m.
- Game attendance: 5,000
- Referee: Mike Thompson

In the third week of the 1911 season, Michigan defeated Ohio State by a 19–0 score at Ferry Field. The game was the 13th meeting in the Michigan–Ohio State football rivalry, with Michigan having won 10 of the prior meetings and tied twice.

After a scoreless first quarter, Stanfield Wells scored a touchdown from the six-yard line early in the second quarter. The extra point attempt by Frederick L. Conklin was unsuccessful. As the game wore on, Michigan's conditioning was in evidence. The Detroit Free Press wrote: "The pace that the Wolverines set was too fast for the men from Ohio and Coach Vaughn was forced to send in a substitute back field." Early in the third quarter, Thomas A. Bogle, Jr. kicked a field goal from the 36-yard line. Later in the third quarter, Michigan blocked a punt by Ohio State's Wright from behind his goal line. Conklin recovered the ball for a touchdown and also kicked the extra point. Michigan led 14–0 at the end of the third quarter. Fullback George C. Thomson scored Michigan's final touchdown on a one-yard run in the fourth quarter. Conklin's kick for extra point was unsuccessful. The game ended with Michigan in possession of the ball at Ohio State's six-inch line.

After the game, the Detroit Free Press called Bogle, Wells and Conklin the "brightest stars of the day," though it noted that Conklin was "not up to snuff on kicking goals or at least was not today." The Free Press also praised the work of Thomson: "Thomson seems to have the habit of taking a big share of the limelight and he lived up to his reputation today. He was not punting far but his kicks were hard to handle and the way he hit the line and bumped off tackle for big gains was a feature."

With three impressive victories to open the season, the Free Press opined that the 1911 team had few weaknesses and called the backfield the "speediest Yost ever has had."

The game was played in 15-minute quarters. Michigan's lineup against Ohio State (starters listed first) was Conklin (left end), Bogle and Roblee (left tackle), Quinn and Bogle (left guard), Paterson (center), Allmendinger and Garrels (right guard), Pontius (right tackle), Wells (right end), McMillan and Picard (quarterback), Craig (left halfback), Carpell and Huebel (right halfback), and Thomson (fullback).

=== Vanderbilt ===
Week 4: Vanderbilt at Michigan

Team	1	2	3	4	Total
Vanderbilt	0	0	3	5	8
• Michigan	0	0	3	6	9

- Date: October 28, 1911
- Location: Ferry Field • Ann Arbor, MI
- Referee: Bradley Walker (Virginia)

On October 28, 1911, Michigan defeated Vanderbilt at Ferry Field by a score of 9 to 8. The game matched Michigan head coach Fielding H. Yost against his former player and brother-in-law, Dan McGugin. Because of the relationship between Yost and McGugin, the two teams played nine times between 1905 and 1923, with Michigan winning eight games and tying one.

Before the game, Coach Yost reminded reporters that Vanderbilt's 1911 team included the same veteran line that had held Yale scoreless in 1910. Yost predicted a hard game.

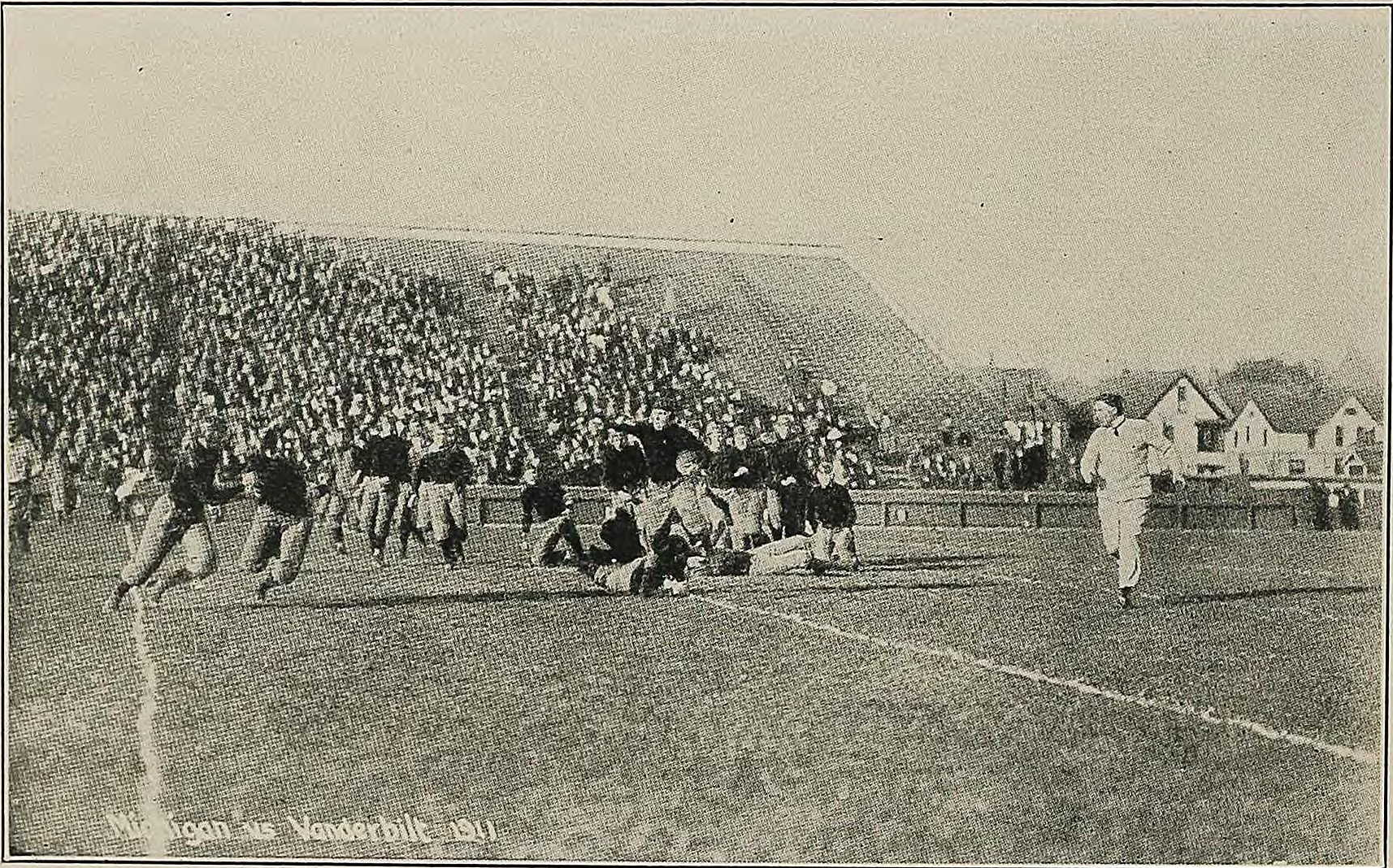
Vandy's Lew Hardage circling left end.

Thomas A. Bogle, Jr. of Michigan attempted two field goals in the first half, but both kicks were blocked. After a scoreless first half, each team kicked a field goal in the third quarter. Vanderbilt kicked its field goal after Shorty McMillan fumbled a punt, and Vanderbilt recovered the ball at Michigan's 27-yard line. Later in the quarter, McMillan carried the ball 33 yards to the Vanderbilt 10-yard line on a quarterback run. Frederick L. Conklin then place-kicked a field goal from the 19-yard line. In the fourth quarter, Stanfield Wells ran five yards for a touchdown, and Conklin kicked the extra point to give Michigan a 9–3 lead. Vanderbilt responded with its own touchdown, but the extra point failed due to a high kickout.

In the Detroit Free Press, E. A. Batchelor wrote: "Vanderbilt's failure to execute properly one of the simplest plays in the football catalogue was all that saved Michigan from the humiliation of a tie score with Dan McGugin's peppery Dixie lads this afternoon." Batchelor opined that, with the exception of halfback Jimmy Craig and center "Bubbles" Paterson, the Wolverines "played their worst game of the season." He described a 75-yard run by Craig in the fourth quarter as "the most spectacular play of the day."

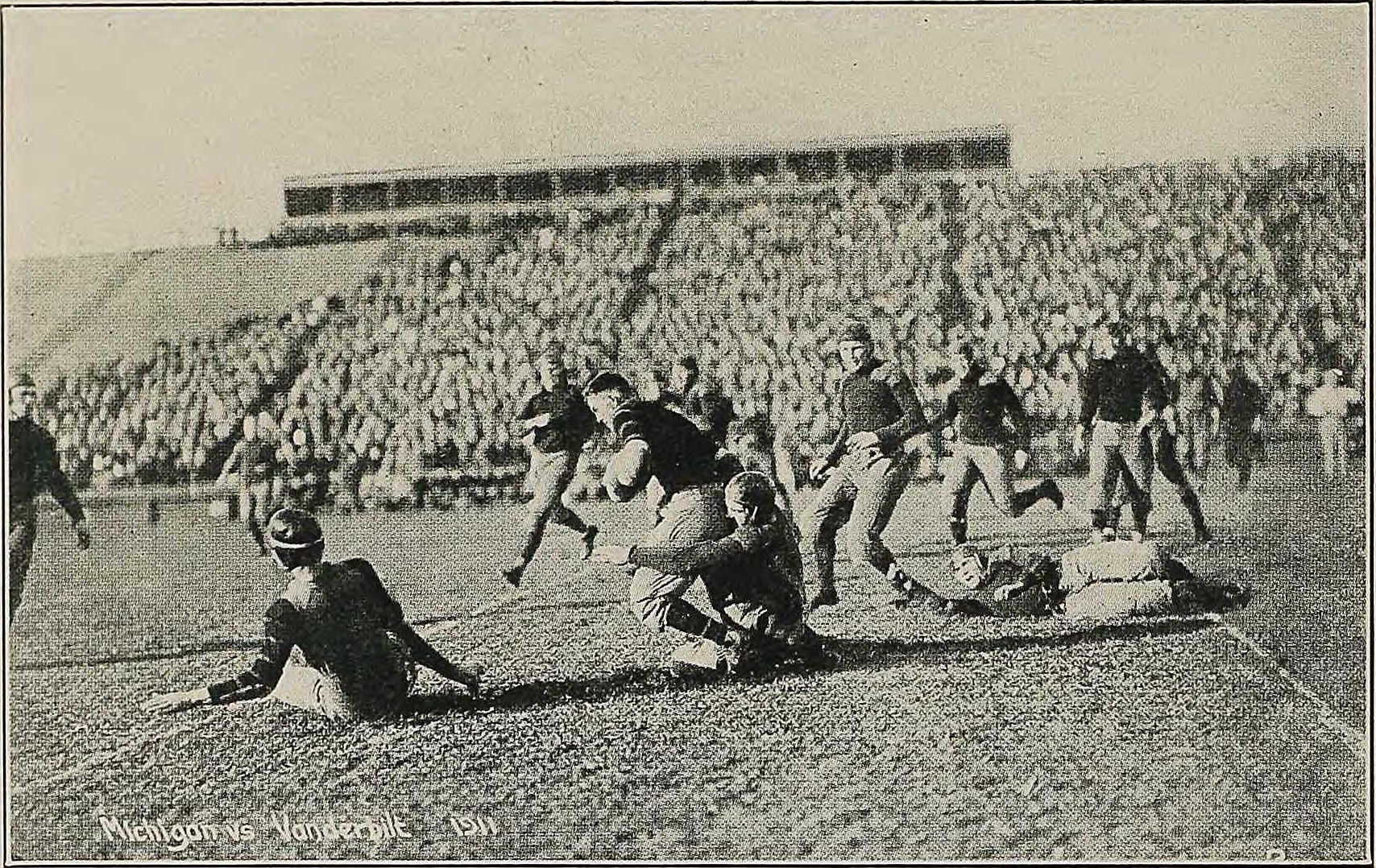
Vandy's Ray Morrison running against Michigan.

Walter Eckersall served as the umpire and covered the game for the Chicago Daily Tribune. Eckersall wrote that Michigan's offense suffered from "an air of overconfidence," its tackling was poor, and the team was completely fooled on forward passes. He opined that the game was a reversal for Michigan, which would need "vast improvement" to defeat Penn and Cornell.

Zach Curlin made Vanderbilt's field goal and Ray Morrison made its touchdown, following it with the failure to kick goal.

The game was played in 15-minute quarters. Michigan's lineup against Vanderbilt was Conklin (left end), Bogle (left tackle), Quinn (left guard), Paterson (center), Garrels (right guard), Pontius (right tackle), Wells (right end), McMillan (quarterback), Craig (left halfback), Carpell (right halfback), and Thomson (fullback). Walter Eckersall was the umpire, and Willie Heston was the head linesman.

=== Syracuse ===
Week 5: Syracuse at Michigan

Team	1	2	3	4	Total
Syracuse	0	0	0	6	6
Michigan	6	0	0	0	6

- Date: November 4, 1911
- Location: Ferry Field • Ann Arbor, MI
- Referee: Lt. Horatio B. Hackett (Army)

In the fifth week of the 1911 season, Michigan played Syracuse to a 6–6 tie at Ferry Field. The game was the fourth played between the schools, with Michigan having won two and Syracuse having won one.

Coming off an unconvincing victory over Vanderbilt, Coach Yost announced major changes in Michigan's lineup. He moved Stanfield Wells from end to halfback, Frederick L. Conklin from end to tackle, and Miller Pontius from tackle to end. He also placed newcomer Howard Kayner in the lineup as the starting left guard. Adding to the disruption, quarterback Shorty McMillan was unable to play against Syracuse after dislocating a knee during a practice scrimmage. Four other players were injured in the week before the Syracuse game—Jimmy Craig with a turned ankle, Clement Quinn with a wrenched shoulder, Allen Garrels with a sprained hand, and Frank Picard with a strained shoulder. With the injuries and the wholesale shift in the lineup, the Detroit Free Press called the week leading up to the Syracuse game "without doubt the most eventful one in the football history of Michigan."

Adding to the mix that led to the unexpected setback against Syracuse, Coach Yost did not attend the game, opting instead to watch the Carlisle-Penn game in preparation for the November 18 game against Penn. Assistant coach Curtis Redden was left in charge of the team for the Syracuse game.

Michigan scored a touchdown in the first quarter against Syracuse on a "line buck" by George C. Thomson, and Thomas A. Bogle, Jr. kicked the extra point. Michigan's 6-0 lead held into the fourth quarter. According to a newspaper account of the game, "Time and again for three periods Michigan ripped Syracuse's line almost to pieces and twice had the ball inches from the Syracuse goal." In the final quarter, Fogg threw a pass to Probst who caught the ball at the Syracuse 45-yard line and ran more than 50 yards before being tackled by Frank Picard and Stanfield Wells at Michigan's two-yard line. Fogg ran for the touchdown, and Day tied the game with a successful extra point kick. In his account of the game, E. A. Batchelor wrote that the Wolverinews played "miserably" and credited fullback Thomson with saving Michigan from defeat with his "splendid" running and kicking.

The game was played in 15-minute quarters. Michigan's lineup against Syracuse (starters listed first) was Garrels and M. Smith (left end), Conklin (left tackle), Kayner (left guard), Paterson (center), Quinn (right guard), Bogle (right tackle), Pontius and Allmendinger (right end), Craig and Picard (quarterback), Torbet (left halfback), Wells and Carpell (right halfback), and Thomson (fullback). John Macklin of Michigan Agricultural College served as the head linesman.

=== At Cornell ===
Week 6: Michigan at Cornell

Team	1	2	3	4	Total
Michigan	0	0	0	0	0
• Cornell	0	0	6	0	6

- Date: November 11, 1911
- Location: Percy Field
  Ithaca, NY
- Game attendance: 10,000
- Referee: Dave Fultz (Brown)

In the sixth week of the 1911, Michigan suffered its only defeat, losing by a 6–0 score against Cornell at Ithaca, New York. The game was the ninth meeting between Michigan and Cornell and the first since the 1894 season.

In the days leading up to the Cornell game, the team was stricken with more injuries to key players. Jimmy Craig, Shorty McMillan, and Miller Pontius were all unable to play. With both quarterbacks injured, Yost was forced to play Frank Picard at the position. E. A. Batchelor wrote that it was a "crippled" Michigan team that traveled to Ithaca. In the days leading up to the game, the Detroit Free Press noted that the usually communicative Yost was quiet with an "air of mystery" surrounding his latest maneuvers.

Michigan held Cornell to one first down in the game, but Cornell scored a touchdown in the third quarter after its captain, Munk, blocked a punt by George Thomson from behind Michigan's goal line. Fritz recovered the ball in the end zone for Cornell, and Butler kicked the extra point.

The game was played in 15-minute quarters. Michigan's lineup against Cornell was Conklin (left end), Quinn (left tackle), Kayner (left guard), Paterson (center), Garrels (right guard), Bogle (right tackle), Pontius and Torbet (right end), Picard (quarterback), Carpell (left halfback), Wells (right halfback), and Thomson (fullback).

=== Penn ===
Week 7: Penn at Michigan

Team	1	2	3	4	Total
Penn	0	0	6	3	9
• Michigan	0	5	0	6	11

- Date: November 18, 1911
- Location: Ferry Field • Ann Arbor, MI
- Referee: Joseph Pendleton (Bowdoin)

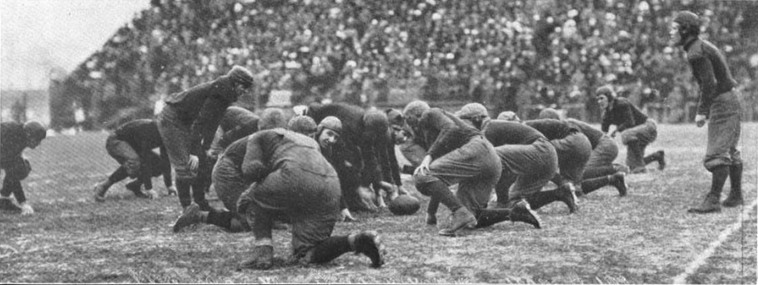
"Waiting for the Signal, Pennsylvania Game"

In the final home game of the 1911 season, Michigan defeated Penn, 11–9, in an icy blizzard before a crowd of 17,000 persons at Ferry Field. Since leaving the Big Ten Conference, Michigan had played annual rivalry games against Penn at or near the end of the season. Penn was one of the dominant football programs of the era, winning seven national championships between 1894 and 1912. The 1911 game was the seventh meeting between the schools. Penn had won the first four games, but Michigan won in 1909 and tied in 1910.

Fullback George C. Thomson did not play against Penn due to the death of his brother. Miller Pontius also missed the game due to a torn muscle. However, Shorty McMillan returned to the lineup at quarterback, and Jimmy Craig returned at halfback. The 1912 Michiganensian described the mood on campus leading up to the game:

"Over Ferry Field hung a cloud of gloom, about the campus lurked a suspicion of inevitable defeat, enthusiasm was missing, but everywhere was a tense grim feeling of fight, of determination, and of never give up spirit. Despite the seemingly hopeless odds, the old Michigan spirit was there, was in every practice under the electric lights, in every sharp cry of the quarterback, in every weary run to the gym, and was a factor more potent than ever before."

The New York Times credited the win to the "craftiness of Coach Yost and the speed of 'Jimmy' Craig." Stanfield Wells scored a touchdown in the second quarter, and Frederick L. Conklin missed the extra point. Penn took the lead in the third quarter on a 50-yard touchdown run by Captain Mercer and an extra point by Minds. In the fourth quarter, Penn extended its lead to 9–5 on a drop-kicked field goal by Marshall from the 25-yard line. Michigan scored the winning touchdown in the fourth quarter on a double pass to Craig who ran 23 yards for the score. Conklin kicked the extra point, and Michigan led, 11–9. The New York Times described the play that resulted in the winning touchdown as a "trick play" in which the Michigan blockers started to the right with Penn's defense following. The ball was the tossed to Craig far to the left side of the field. The Times called Craig Michigan's "offensive and defensive hero" in a "clean, snappy, spectacular, thrilling" game.

Walter Eckersall was the field judge and covered the game for the Chicago Daily Tribune. He also called Craig the hero of the game and wrote that Michigan gave "a remarkable exhibition," played "hard and aggressive football" and "executed cleverly and faultlessly" an intricate formation. He called it "a decided triumph for western football" and "a great game, the sort that makes football history."

The game was played in 15-minute quarters. Michigan's lineup against Penn (starters listed first) was Conklin (left end), Quinn (left tackle), Kayner (left guard), Paterson (center), Garrels (right guard), Bogle (right tackle), Torbet and Carpell (right end), McMillan (quarterback), Craig (left halfback), Wells and Huebel (right halfback), and Meek (fullback). Walter Eckersall was the field judge.

=== At Nebraska ===
Week 8: Michigan at Nebraska

Team	1	2	3	4	Total
Michigan	0	0	6	0	6
Nebraska	0	0	6	0	6

- Date: November 25, 1911
- Location: Nebraska Field
  Lincoln, NE
- Referee: Theodore M. Stuart (Michigan)

Michigan concluded its 1911 season with a 6–6 tie against Nebraska. The game was the second meeting between the two programs. Michigan won the first game, 31-0, in 1905. Nebraska won the Missouri Valley Conference championship the week before the Michigan game, and it came into the game with a 5-1-1 record, having outscored opponents 275 to 27.

The week before the Nebraska game saw continuing changes in Michigan's lineup. Although George C. Thomson returned to the lineup after attending his brother's funeral, Stanfield Wells and Miller Pontius were unable to play in the Nebraska game. Yost was forced to start a backup, Herschel Smith, at the right halfback position. Five days before the Nebraska game, the Detroit Free Press quipped that Michigan could claim the world championship of injuries, having had more injuries in 1911 than ever before in the program's history.

After a scoreless first half, each team scored a touchdown in the third quarter. Frederick L. Conklin blocked a Nebraska punt, recovered the ball, and ran 30 yards for a touchdown. The Chicago Daily Tribune wrote: "Conklin broke through, blocked it, turned like lightning and sped without interference across the goal line for Michigan's first touchdown." Conklin also converted the extra point kick after his touchdown. Nebraska responded on the next drive with two long end runs that took the ball to Michigan's eight-yard line. From there, Nebraska halfback Purdy ran for the touchdown.

The New York Times called the game "the hardest contest ever witnessed on Nebraska Field." The 1912 Michiganensian opined that a mistake had been made in scheduling another game after the annual rivalry match with Penn: "Then came the anti-climax, the Nebraska game. Frankly this game, the scheduling of it, the playing of it, was a mistake from the first. Every football season has but one legitimate finish, the big game. The team is practiced for it, the men are trained for it. To have another contest follow, inevitably means a slump, not only in form, but in condition."

Michigan's lineup against Nebraska was Conklin (left end), Quinn (left tackle), Kayner (left guard), Paterson (center), Garrels and Allmendinger (right guard), Bogle (right tackle), Herrington and Carpell (right end), McMillan (quarterback), Craig (left halfback), Herschel Smith (right halfback), and Thomson (fullback).

=== Post-season ===
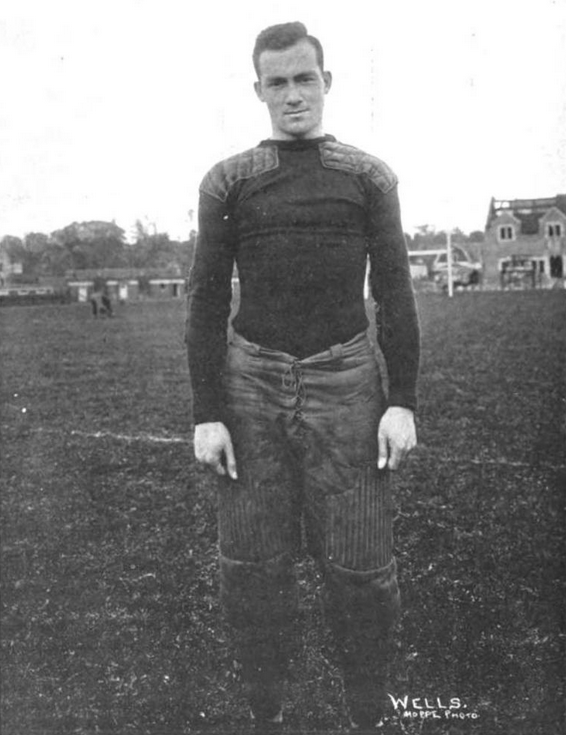
All-American Stanfield Wells

The 1912 Michiganensian summarized the 1911 football season as follows:

"It was rather a checkered season, the football year of 1911, marred by defeat, spoiled by tie games, dismal in spots, brilliant in others, and darkened by an unceasing list of injuries and misfortunes. . . . It is a hard season to compute as to its success, and yet a thorough summing up must show it as a success, a fight against odds, and a glorious culmination."

At the end of the season, Stanfield Wells was selected as a first-team All-American both by The New York Globe and Dr. Henry L. Williams, longtime coach at the University of Minnesota. Wells was selected as a third-team player on Walter Camp's All-American team for Collier's Weekly. Three Michigan players, Wells, Frederick L. Conklin, and Jimmy Craig, were selected for Outing magazine's Roll of Football Honor.

Several Michigan players received All-Western honors as follows:

- In Collier's Weekly, E. C. Patterson selected Wells and George C. Thomson as first-team All-Western players. He also selected Conklin and Craig as second-team All-Western players.
- In the Chicago Daily Tribune, Walter Eckersall picked three Michigan players as first-team All-Western players. They were Wells at right end, Conklin at left tackle, and Thomson at fullback. Eckersall also named Conklin as the captain of his All-Western team. He also selected Miller Pontius, Shorty McMillan and Jimmy Craig as second-team players.
- Chicago sportswriter G. W. Axelson picked Conklin, Wells and Craig as first-team players on his All-Western team.
- The Detroit News selected Conklin and Wells as first-team All-Western players.

Fielding H. Yost's contract as Michigan's head coach expired at the end of the 1911 season, leading to concerns over whether he would return. On December 16, 1911, it was announced that Yost had agreed to a two-year contract to remain at Michigan for the 1912 and 1913 seasons.

== Players ==
=== Varsity letter winners ===
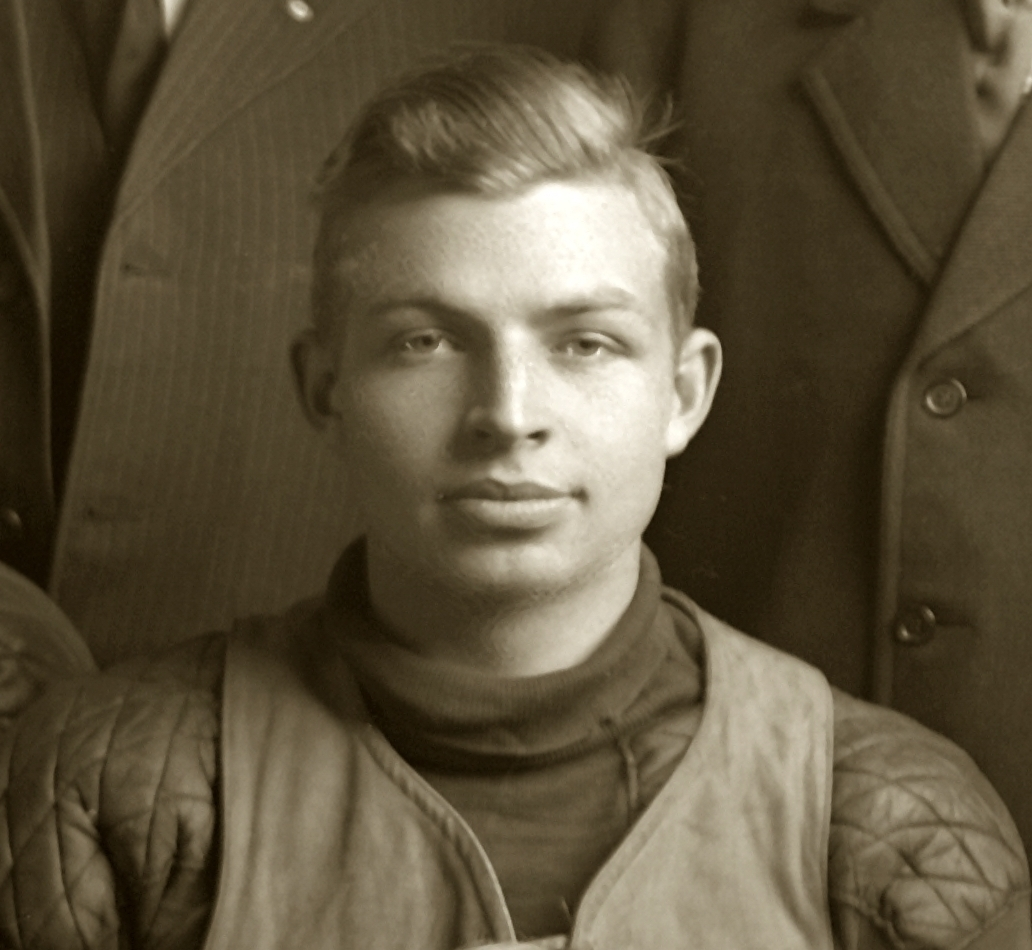
Team captain Frederick L. Conklin

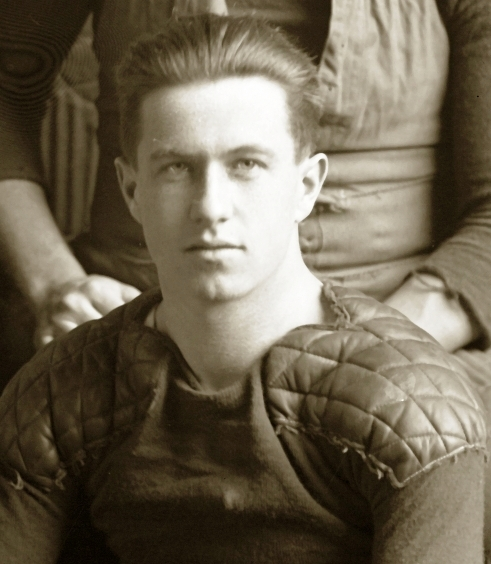
Quarterback Shorty McMillan

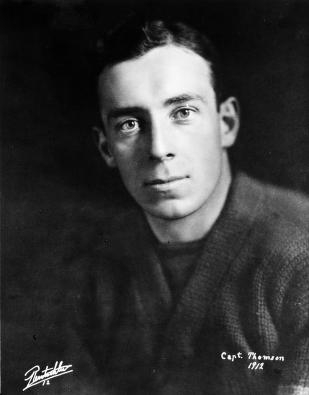
Fullback and leading scorer George C. Thomson

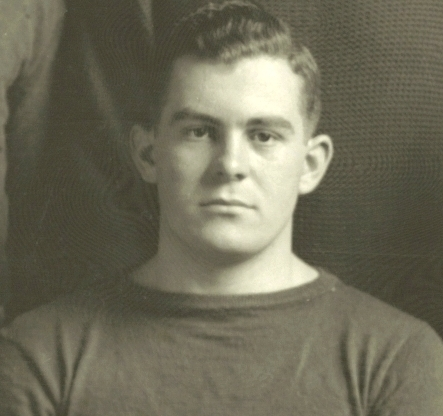
Center George C. Paterson

The following 16 players received varsity "M" letters for their participation on the 1911 football team:

- Thomas A. Bogle, Jr. – started 4 games at right tackle (Syracuse, Cornell, Penn and Nebraska), 2 games at left guard (Case and M.A.C.), and 1 game at left tackle (Ohio State and Vanderbilt)
- Otto Carpell – started 3 games at right halfback (M.A.C., Ohio State and Vanderbilt), 1 game at right end (Penn), 1 game at left halfback (Cornell); also appeared as a substitute in the Syracuse game at right halfback and in the Nebraska game at right end
- Frederick L. Conklin – started 6 games at left end (Ohio State, Vanderbilt, Syracuse, Cornell, Penn and Nebraska), 2 games at left tackle (Case, M.A.C.)
- Jimmy Craig – started 4 games at left halfback (Ohio State, Vanderbilt, Penn and Nebraska), 3 games at quarterback (Case, M.A.C. and Syracuse)
- Allan E. Garrels – started 4 games at right guard (Ohio State, Cornell, Penn and Nebraska), 3 games at left end (Case, M.A.C., Syracuse)
- Herbert Huebel – started 1 game at right halfback (Case); also appeared as a substitute at right halfback against Ohio State and Penn
- Howard S. Kayner, Gasport, N.Y. – started 4 games at left guard (Syracuse, Cornell, Penn and Nebraska)
- Neil "Shorty" McMillan – started 4 games at quarterback (Ohio State, Vanderbilt, Penn and Nebraska); also appeared as a substitute at quarterback against M.A.C.
- Richard C. Meek – started 1 game at fullback (Penn)
- George C. Paterson – started all 8 games at center
- Frank A. Picard – started 1 game at quarterback (Cornell); also appeared as a substitute quarterback against Case, Ohio State and Syracuse
- Miller Pontius – started 4 games at right tackle (Case, M.A.C., Ohio State and Vanderbilt), 2 games at right end (Syracuse and Cornell)
- Clement P. Quinn, – started 3 games at left tackle (Cornell, Penn and Nebraska), 2 games at left guard (Ohio State and Vanderbilt), 1 game at right guard (Syracuse); also appeared as a substitute at right guard against Case and M.A.C.
- George "Bottles" Thomson - started 7 games at fullback (missed the Penn game)
- Roy Torbet – started 3 games at left halfback (Case, M.A.C. and Syracuse) and 1 game at right end (Penn); also appeared as a substitute right end at Cornell
- Stanfield Wells – started 4 games at right end (Case, M.A.C., Ohio State and Vanderbilt), 3 games at right halfback (Syracuse, Cornell and Penn)

=== Reserves ===
The following players were awarded "R" letters as members of the Reserves on the 1911 football team:

- Ernest Allmendinger – started 3 games at right guard (Case, M.A.C. and Ohio State)
- Louis Bleich
- Hiram Beach Carpenter
- Raymond D. Cooper
- Donald G. Dennison
- Gates
- William C. Hanlon
- Grover C. Herrington – started 1 game at right end (Nebraska); also appeared as a substitute left halfback against Case and M.A.C.
- William Kennedy
- Glenn R. Madison
- George N. Maurer
- Frank M. McHale
- James A. McLaughlin
- William Kirke Otis – center
- Reuben Peterson – tackle
- Cyril Quinn
- William F. Quinn
- Lawrence H. Roblee - appeared as a substitute right halfback against Case and as a substitute left tackle against Ohio State
- Samuel S. Scott
- Robert Shaw
- Allen F. Sherzer
- Herschel C. Smith – started 1 game (Nebraska) at right halfback
- Henry L. Wenner – appeared as a substitute right halfback against Case
- David L. Wiggins
- Charles E. Wyman – end
- Edgar P. Wyman

=== Scoring leaders ===
Player	Touchdowns	Extra points	Field goals	Points
George C. Thomson	7	0	0	35
Frederick L. Conklin	2	10	2	26
Stanfield Wells	4	0	0	20
Jimmy Craig	1	0	0	5
Thomas A. Bogle, Jr.	0	1	1	4
Totals	14	11	3	90

== Awards and honors ==
- Captain: Frederick L. Conklin
- All-Americans: Stanfield Wells (Walter Camp, 3rd team; New York Globe, 1st team; Henry L. Williams, 1st team)
- All-Western: Stanfield Wells (Eckersall, Patterson, Axelson, and The Detroit News), Frederick L. Conklin (Eckersall, Axelson, and The Detroit News), George C. Thomson (Eckersall and Patterson), Jimmy Craig (Axelson).

== Coaching staff ==
- Head coach: Fielding H. Yost
- Assistant coaches: Curtis Redden, Andrew W. Smith
- Trainer: Alvin Kraenzlein
- Manager: William J. Learmonth
- Director of Outdoor Athletics: Philip Bartelme
