= 1911 Wabash Little Giants football team =

American college football season

1911 Wabash Little Giants football
- Conference: Independent
- Record: 3–3–1
- Head coach: Jesse Harper (3rd season)

1911 Midwestern college football independents records
	Conf.			Overall
Team	W	L	T	W		L		T
Marquette		–		7	–	0	–	2
Notre Dame		–		6	–	0	–	2
Fairmount		–		7	–	1	–	0
South Dakota		–		7	–	1	–	0
Michigan Agricultural		–		5	–	1	–	0
Northern Illinois State		–		8	–	2	–	1
Saint Louis		–		6	–	1	–	1
Lake Forest		–		5	–	1	–	1
Mount Union		–		7	–	2	–	0
Michigan		–		5	–	1	–	2
North Dakota Agricultural		–		3	–	1	–	0
St. Viator		–		4	–	2	–	0
Haskell		–		4	–	2	–	3
Iowa State Teachers		–		3	–	2	–	1
Ohio Northern		–		5	–	4	–	0
Detroit		–		4	–	4	–	0
Central Michigan		–		3	–	3	–	0
South Dakota State		–		4	–	4	–	0
St. Mary's (OH)		–		3	–	3	–	1
Wabash		–		3	–	3	–	1
Buchtel		–		3	–	4	–	1
Butler		–		3	–	4	–	1
Carthage		–		3	–	4	–	1
Doane		–		3	–	4	–	0
Michigan State Normal		–		3	–	4	–	0
Heidelberg		–		2	–	3	–	1
Western State Normal		–		2	–	3	–	0
Loyola (IL)		–		2	–	5	–	0

The 1911 Wabash Little Giants football team represented Wabash College as an independent during the 1911 college football season. Led by third-year head coach Jesse Harper, the Little Giants compiled a record of 3–3–1, and outscored their opponents 50 to 43.

== Schedule ==
Date	Opponent	Site	Result	Source
October 7	Purdue	Stuart Field; West Lafayette, IN	W 3–0	
October 13	DePauw	Crawfordsville, IN	T 0–0	
October 21	Marquette	Milwaukee, WI	L 9–11	
November 4	Earlham	Crawfordsville, IN	W 12–3	
November 11	Rose Polytechnic	Terre Haute, IN	W 17–6	
November 20	Notre Dame	Crawfordsville, IN	L 3–6	
November 30	Michigan Agricultural	College Field; East Lansing, MI	L 6–17	
