= 1911 Buchtel football team =

American college football season

1911 Buchtel football
- Conference: Independent
- Record: 3–4–1
- Head coach: Frank Haggerty (2nd season)
- Captain: Charles Costigan
- Home stadium: League Park

1911 Midwestern college football independents records
	Conf.			Overall
Team	W	L	T	W		L		T
Marquette		–		7	–	0	–	2
Notre Dame		–		6	–	0	–	2
Fairmount		–		7	–	1	–	0
South Dakota		–		7	–	1	–	0
Michigan Agricultural		–		5	–	1	–	0
Northern Illinois State		–		8	–	2	–	1
Saint Louis		–		6	–	1	–	1
Lake Forest		–		5	–	1	–	1
Mount Union		–		7	–	2	–	0
Michigan		–		5	–	1	–	2
North Dakota Agricultural		–		3	–	1	–	0
St. Viator		–		4	–	2	–	0
Haskell		–		4	–	2	–	3
Iowa State Teachers		–		3	–	2	–	1
Ohio Northern		–		5	–	4	–	0
Detroit		–		4	–	4	–	0
Central Michigan		–		3	–	3	–	0
South Dakota State		–		4	–	4	–	0
St. Mary's (OH)		–		3	–	3	–	1
Wabash		–		3	–	3	–	1
Buchtel		–		3	–	4	–	1
Butler		–		3	–	4	–	1
Carthage		–		3	–	4	–	1
Doane		–		3	–	4	–	0
Michigan State Normal		–		3	–	4	–	0
Heidelberg		–		2	–	3	–	1
Western State Normal		–		2	–	3	–	0
Loyola (IL)		–		2	–	5	–	0

The 1911 Buchtel football team represented Buchtel College in the 1911 college football season. The team was led by head coach Frank Haggerty, in his second season. Buchtel outscored their opponents by a total of 80–24.

== Schedule ==
Date	Time	Opponent	Site	Result
September 30	2:30 p.m.	Muskingum	League Park; Akron, OH	W 48–2
October 7	2:45 p.m.	Mount Union	League Park; Akron, OH	L 0–9
October 21		Hiram	League Park; Akron, OH	L 0–3
October 28		Marietta	League Park; Akron, OH	L 0–5
November 4		Ohio Northern	League Park; Akron, OH	W 26–0
November 11		Western Reserve	League Park; Akron, OH	T 0–0
November 18		Case	League Park; Akron, OH	L 0–5
November 30		Allegheny	League Park; Akron, OH	W 6–0
