= 1911 Marquette Blue and Gold football team =

American college football season

1911 Marquette Blue and Gold football
- Conference: Independent
- Record: 7–0–2
- Head coach: William Juneau (4th season)

1911 Midwestern college football independents records
	Conf.			Overall
Team	W	L	T	W		L		T
Marquette		–		7	–	0	–	2
Notre Dame		–		6	–	0	–	2
Fairmount		–		7	–	1	–	0
South Dakota		–		7	–	1	–	0
Michigan Agricultural		–		5	–	1	–	0
Northern Illinois State		–		8	–	2	–	1
Saint Louis		–		6	–	1	–	1
Lake Forest		–		5	–	1	–	1
Mount Union		–		7	–	2	–	0
Michigan		–		5	–	1	–	2
North Dakota Agricultural		–		3	–	1	–	0
St. Viator		–		4	–	2	–	0
Haskell		–		4	–	2	–	3
Iowa State Teachers		–		3	–	2	–	1
Ohio Northern		–		5	–	4	–	0
Detroit		–		4	–	4	–	0
Central Michigan		–		3	–	3	–	0
South Dakota State		–		4	–	4	–	0
St. Mary's (OH)		–		3	–	3	–	1
Wabash		–		3	–	3	–	1
Buchtel		–		3	–	4	–	1
Butler		–		3	–	4	–	1
Carthage		–		3	–	4	–	1
Doane		–		3	–	4	–	0
Michigan State Normal		–		3	–	4	–	0
Heidelberg		–		2	–	3	–	1
Western State Normal		–		2	–	3	–	0
Loyola (IL)		–		2	–	5	–	0

The 1911 Marquette Blue and Gold football team was an American football team that represented Marquette University as an independent during the 1911 college football season. In its fourth and final season under head coach William Juneau, the team compiled a 7–0–2 record.

== Schedule ==
Date	Opponent	Site	Result	Source
October 7	at Carroll (WI)	Waukesha, WI	W 11–5	
October 14	William & Vashti	Milwaukee, WI	W 31–0	
October 21	Wabash	Milwaukee, WI	W 11–9	
October 28	at DePaul	Chicago, IL	W 18–0	
November 4	Villanova	Milwaukee, WI	T 0–0	
November 11	South Dakota State	Milwaukee, WI	W 16–0	
November 18	Creighton	Milwaukee, WI	W 44–17	
November 25	Loyola (IL)	Milwaukee, WI	W 37–0	
November 30	Notre Dame	Milwaukee, WI	T 0–0	
