= 1911 Central Michigan Normalites football team =

American college football season

1911 Central Michigan Normalites football
- Conference: Independent
- Record: 3–3
- Head coach: Harry Helmer (3rd season)

1911 Midwestern college football independents records
| | Conf. | | | Overall |
| Team | W | L | T | W | | L | | T |
|---|---|---|---|---|---|---|---|---|
| Marquette | | – | | 7 | – | 0 | – | 2 |
| Notre Dame | | – | | 6 | – | 0 | – | 2 |
| Fairmount | | – | | 7 | – | 1 | – | 0 |
| South Dakota | | – | | 7 | – | 1 | – | 0 |
| Michigan Agricultural | | – | | 5 | – | 1 | – | 0 |
| Northern Illinois State | | – | | 8 | – | 2 | – | 1 |
| Saint Louis | | – | | 6 | – | 1 | – | 1 |
| Lake Forest | | – | | 5 | – | 1 | – | 1 |
| Mount Union | | – | | 7 | – | 2 | – | 0 |
| Michigan | | – | | 5 | – | 1 | – | 2 |
| North Dakota Agricultural | | – | | 3 | – | 1 | – | 0 |
| St. Viator | | – | | 4 | – | 2 | – | 0 |
| Haskell | | – | | 4 | – | 2 | – | 3 |
| Iowa State Teachers | | – | | 3 | – | 2 | – | 1 |
| Ohio Northern | | – | | 5 | – | 4 | – | 0 |
| Detroit | | – | | 4 | – | 4 | – | 0 |
| Central Michigan | | – | | 3 | – | 3 | – | 0 |
| South Dakota State | | – | | 4 | – | 4 | – | 0 |
| St. Mary's (OH) | | – | | 3 | – | 3 | – | 1 |
| Wabash | | – | | 3 | – | 3 | – | 1 |
| Buchtel | | – | | 3 | – | 4 | – | 1 |
| Butler | | – | | 3 | – | 4 | – | 1 |
| Carthage | | – | | 3 | – | 4 | – | 1 |
| Doane | | – | | 3 | – | 4 | – | 0 |
| Michigan State Normal | | – | | 3 | – | 4 | – | 0 |
| Heidelberg | | – | | 2 | – | 3 | – | 1 |
| Western State Normal | | – | | 2 | – | 3 | – | 0 |
| Loyola (IL) | | – | | 2 | – | 5 | – | 0 |

The 1911 Central Michigan Normalites football team represented Central Michigan Normal School, later renamed Central Michigan University, as an independent during the 1911 college football season. In their third season under head coach Harry Helmer, the Central Michigan football team compiled a 3–3 record and were outscored by their opponents by a combined total of 29 to 26. The team won its first three games, all against high school teams, and lost its final three games against the Michigan School for the Deaf (6–0), Ferris State (11–0), and the Michigan Agricultural freshman team (6–0).

== Schedule ==
| Date | Opponent | Site | Result | Source |
|---|---|---|---|---|
| | West Branch High School | | W 17–6 | |
| | Michigan School for the Deaf | | L 0–6 | |
| October 21 | at Michigan Agricultural freshmen | East Lansing, MI | L 0–21 | |
| October 28 | at Ithaca High School | Ithaca, MI | W 3–0 | |
| November 4 | Mount Pleasant High School | | W 6–0 | |
