= 1911 Ohio Northern football team =

American college football season

1911 Ohio Northern football
- Conference: Independent
- Record: 5–4
- Head coach: Marion J. Bradshaw (1st season)

1911 Midwestern college football independents records
	Conf.			Overall
Team	W	L	T	W		L		T
Marquette		–		7	–	0	–	2
Notre Dame		–		6	–	0	–	2
Fairmount		–		7	–	1	–	0
South Dakota		–		7	–	1	–	0
Michigan Agricultural		–		5	–	1	–	0
Northern Illinois State		–		8	–	2	–	1
Saint Louis		–		6	–	1	–	1
Lake Forest		–		5	–	1	–	1
Mount Union		–		7	–	2	–	0
Michigan		–		5	–	1	–	2
North Dakota Agricultural		–		3	–	1	–	0
St. Viator		–		4	–	2	–	0
Haskell		–		4	–	2	–	3
Iowa State Teachers		–		3	–	2	–	1
Ohio Northern		–		5	–	4	–	0
Detroit		–		4	–	4	–	0
Central Michigan		–		3	–	3	–	0
South Dakota State		–		4	–	4	–	0
St. Mary's (OH)		–		3	–	3	–	1
Wabash		–		3	–	3	–	1
Buchtel		–		3	–	4	–	1
Butler		–		3	–	4	–	1
Carthage		–		3	–	4	–	1
Doane		–		3	–	4	–	0
Michigan State Normal		–		3	–	4	–	0
Heidelberg		–		2	–	3	–	1
Western State Normal		–		2	–	3	–	0
Loyola (IL)		–		2	–	5	–	0

The 1911 Ohio Northern football team represented Ohio Northern University during the 1911 college football season.

== Schedule ==
Date	Opponent	Site	Result	Source
October 7	at Notre Dame	Cartier Field; Notre Dame, IN	L 6–32	
October 14	at Pittsburgh	Franklin Field; Pittsburgh, PA	L 0–22	
	Central Mennonite	Ada, OH	W 38–3	
October 21	at Heidelberg	Tiffin, OH	W 14–0	
	Muskingum	Ada, OH	W 103–0	
November 4	at Buchtel	League Park; Akron, OH	L 0–26	
	Wittenberg		W 10–0	
	Antioch	Ada, OH	W 10–5	
November 30	at Mount Union	Alliance, OH	L 0–19	
