= Thomas A. Bogle Jr. =

American football player and coach (1890–1955)

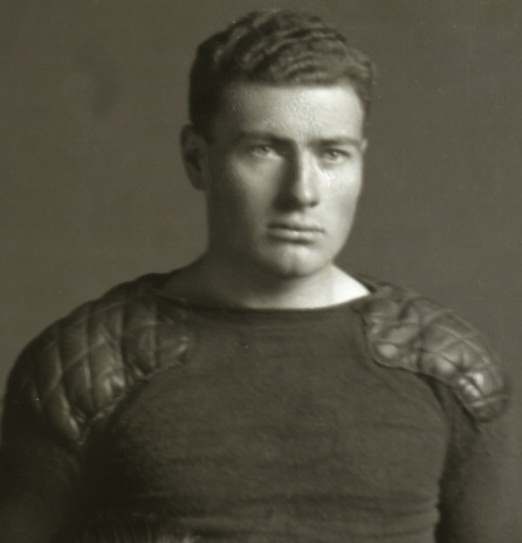
- Bogle from 1911 Michigan football team portrait

Biographical details
- Born: March 7, 1890; Ann Arbor, Michigan, U.S.
- Died: September 21, 1955 (aged 65); Detroit, Michigan, U.S.

Playing career
- 1910–1911: Michigan
- Positions: Center, guard, tackle

Coaching career (HC unless noted)
- 1913–1914: DePauw

Head coaching record
- Overall: 9–7–1

Thomas Ashford Bogle Jr. (March 7, 1890 – September 21, 1955) was an American college football player and coach. He played as a lineman for the University of Michigan from 1910 to 1911 and served as the head football coach at DePauw University from 1913 to 1914.

== Early years ==
Bogle was born in Ann Arbor, Michigan in 1890. His father, Thomas A. Bogle Sr., was a law professor at the University of Michigan.

== University of Michigan ==
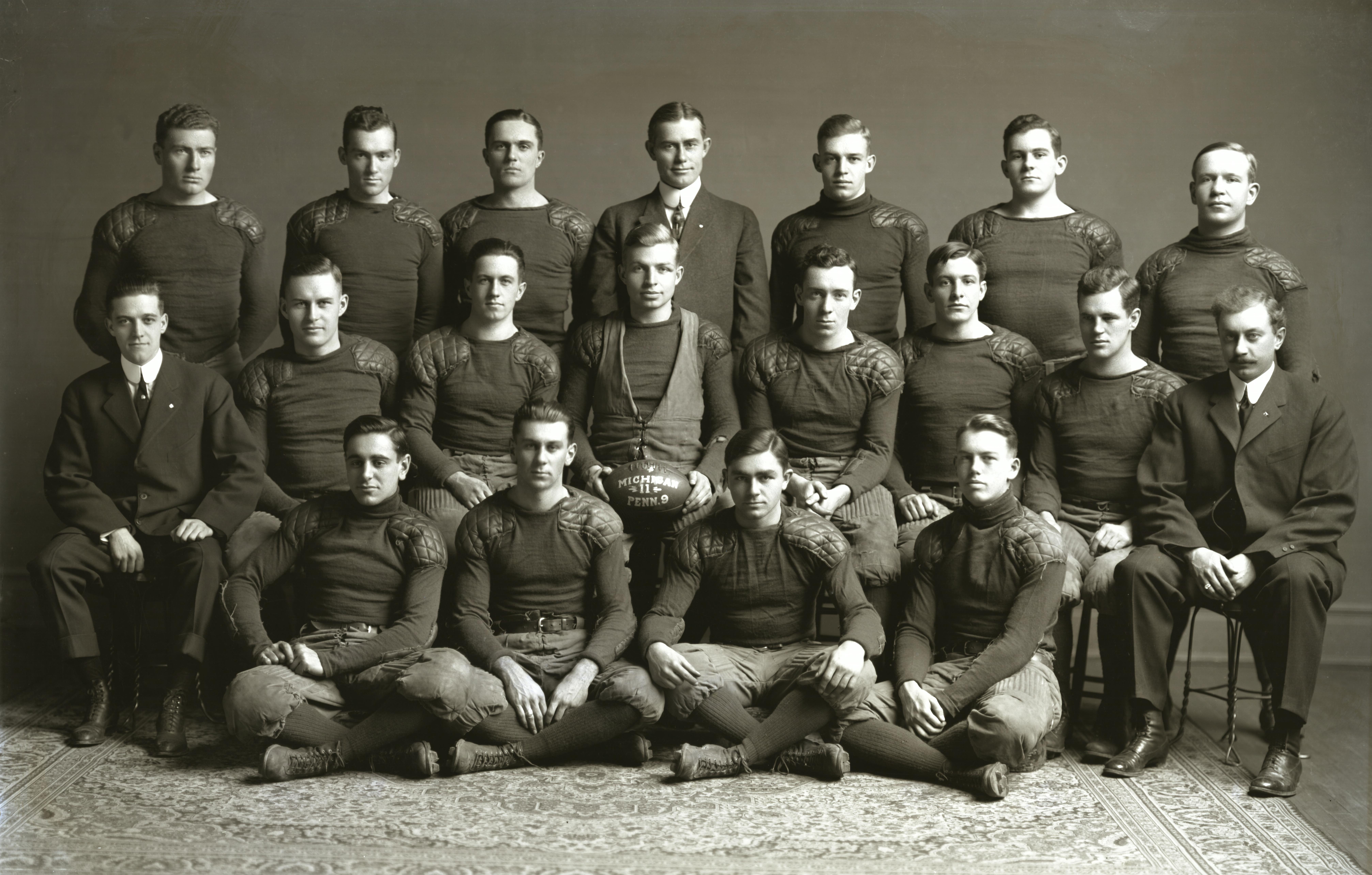
1911 Michigan Wolverines football team

He attended the University of Michigan, graduating from the Literary Department in 1912. While attending Michigan, Bogle played as a lineman for Fielding H. Yost's Michigan Wolverines football team from 1910 to 1911. He also competed for Michigan's track team, receiving varsity letters in track in his sophomore, junior, and senior years.

== DePauw ==
Bogle was hired as the head football coach at DePauw University in Greencastle, Indiana in August 1913. In two years as the head coach at DePauw, he compiled a record of 9–7–1. In 1913, he led DePauw to a 5–2–1 record and the championship of the Indiana Secondary Schools. In the 1914 season opener, Bogle scheduled a game against his mentor, Fielding Yost. In the days before the game, an Indiana newspaper wrote:

"Coach Bogle of DePauw, learned the gridiron game from Hurry Up Yost. Bogle will have a chance to show how much of the game he knows when his team is pitted against the eleven of his former mentor at Ann Arbor Wednesday. Bogle was a lineman at the Wolverine institution."

DePauw lost to Michigan by a score of 58 to 0.

== Later years ==
At the time of the 1920 and 1930 United States Censuses, Bogle was living in Ann Arbor working as a school teacher.
