= 1911 Michigan State Normal Normalites football team =

American college football season

1911 Michigan State Normal Normalites football
- Conference: Independent
- Record: 3–4
- Head coach: Dwight Wilson (1st season)
- Captain: Guy A. Durgan

1911 Midwestern college football independents records
	Conf.			Overall
Team	W	L	T	W		L		T
Marquette		–		7	–	0	–	2
Notre Dame		–		6	–	0	–	2
Fairmount		–		7	–	1	–	0
South Dakota		–		7	–	1	–	0
Michigan Agricultural		–		5	–	1	–	0
Northern Illinois State		–		8	–	2	–	1
Saint Louis		–		6	–	1	–	1
Lake Forest		–		5	–	1	–	1
Mount Union		–		7	–	2	–	0
Michigan		–		5	–	1	–	2
North Dakota Agricultural		–		3	–	1	–	0
St. Viator		–		4	–	2	–	0
Haskell		–		4	–	2	–	3
Iowa State Teachers		–		3	–	2	–	1
Ohio Northern		–		5	–	4	–	0
Detroit		–		4	–	4	–	0
Central Michigan		–		3	–	3	–	0
South Dakota State		–		4	–	4	–	0
St. Mary's (OH)		–		3	–	3	–	1
Wabash		–		3	–	3	–	1
Buchtel		–		3	–	4	–	1
Butler		–		3	–	4	–	1
Carthage		–		3	–	4	–	1
Doane		–		3	–	4	–	0
Michigan State Normal		–		3	–	4	–	0
Heidelberg		–		2	–	3	–	1
Western State Normal		–		2	–	3	–	0
Loyola (IL)		–		2	–	5	–	0

The 1911 Michigan State Normal Normalites football team was an American football team that represented Michigan State Normal College (later renamed Eastern Michigan University) as an independent during the 1911 college football season. In their first and only season under head coach Dwight Wilson, the Normalites compiled a 3–4 record and were outscored by a total of 71 to 43. Guy A. Durgan was the team captain.

== Schedule ==
Date	Opponent	Site	Result	Attendance	Source
October 14	at Detroit University School	Detroit, MI	W 17–0		
October 21	Adrian	Ypsilanti, MI	L 0–9		
October 28	Alumni	Ypsilanti, MI	W 6–0		
November 4	Battle Creek Normal	Ypsilanti, MI	W 17–0		
November 9	Detroit	Ypsilanti, MI	L 0–6	1,500	
November 25	at Hillsdale	Hillsdale, MI	L 6–28		
November 30	at Culver Military Academy	Culver, IN	L 0–28		
