= 1911 Northern Illinois State Normal football team =

American college football season

1911 Northern Illinois State Normal football
- Conference: Independent
- Record: 8–1–2
- Head coach: William Wirtz (2nd season)
- Captain: James Sawyer
- Home stadium: Glidden Field

1911 Midwestern college football independents records
	Conf.			Overall
Team	W	L	T	W		L		T
Marquette		–		7	–	0	–	2
Notre Dame		–		6	–	0	–	2
Fairmount		–		7	–	1	–	0
South Dakota		–		7	–	1	–	0
Michigan Agricultural		–		5	–	1	–	0
Northern Illinois State		–		8	–	2	–	1
Saint Louis		–		6	–	1	–	1
Lake Forest		–		5	–	1	–	1
Mount Union		–		7	–	2	–	0
Michigan		–		5	–	1	–	2
North Dakota Agricultural		–		3	–	1	–	0
St. Viator		–		4	–	2	–	0
Haskell		–		4	–	2	–	3
Iowa State Teachers		–		3	–	2	–	1
Ohio Northern		–		5	–	4	–	0
Detroit		–		4	–	4	–	0
Central Michigan		–		3	–	3	–	0
South Dakota State		–		4	–	4	–	0
St. Mary's (OH)		–		3	–	3	–	1
Wabash		–		3	–	3	–	1
Buchtel		–		3	–	4	–	1
Butler		–		3	–	4	–	1
Carthage		–		3	–	4	–	1
Doane		–		3	–	4	–	0
Michigan State Normal		–		3	–	4	–	0
Heidelberg		–		2	–	3	–	1
Western State Normal		–		2	–	3	–	0
Loyola (IL)		–		2	–	5	–	0

The 1911 Northern Illinois State Normal football team represented Northern Illinois State Normal College as an independent in the 1911 college football season. They were led by second-year head coach William Wirtz and played their home games at Glidden Field, located on the east end of campus. The team finished the season with a 8–1–2 record. James Sawyer was the team's captain.

== Schedule ==
Date	Opponent	Site	Result	Source
September 16	DeKalb All-Stars	Glidden Field; DeKalb, IL	T 5–5	
September 23	at Sycamore High School	Sycamore, IL	W 57–0	
September 30	at Beloit	Beloit, WI	L 0–42	
October 7	Rochelle High School	Rochelle, IL	W 33–0	
October 14	Alumni	Glidden Field; DeKalb, IL	W 16–10	
October 21	at Dixon	Dixon, IL	W 21–7	
October 28	Dixon	Glidden Field; DeKalb, IL	W 15–10	
November 4	at West Aurora High School	Aurora, IL	T 0–0	
November 11	at Elgin High School	Elgin, IL	W 6–5	
November 18	East Aurora High School	Glidden Field; DeKalb, IL	W 10–0	
November 25	Elgin Academy	Glidden Field; DeKalb, IL	W 35–5	
