= 1911 Detroit Tigers football team =

American college football season

1911 Detroit Tigers football
- Conference: Independent
- Record: 4–4
- Head coach: Royal R. Campbell (1st season)

1911 Midwestern college football independents records
	Conf.			Overall
Team	W	L	T	W		L		T
Marquette		–		7	–	0	–	2
Notre Dame		–		6	–	0	–	2
Fairmount		–		7	–	1	–	0
South Dakota		–		7	–	1	–	0
Michigan Agricultural		–		5	–	1	–	0
Northern Illinois State		–		8	–	2	–	1
Saint Louis		–		6	–	1	–	1
Lake Forest		–		5	–	1	–	1
Mount Union		–		7	–	2	–	0
Michigan		–		5	–	1	–	2
North Dakota Agricultural		–		3	–	1	–	0
St. Viator		–		4	–	2	–	0
Haskell		–		4	–	2	–	3
Iowa State Teachers		–		3	–	2	–	1
Ohio Northern		–		5	–	4	–	0
Detroit		–		4	–	4	–	0
Central Michigan		–		3	–	3	–	0
South Dakota State		–		4	–	4	–	0
St. Mary's (OH)		–		3	–	3	–	1
Wabash		–		3	–	3	–	1
Buchtel		–		3	–	4	–	1
Butler		–		3	–	4	–	1
Carthage		–		3	–	4	–	1
Doane		–		3	–	4	–	0
Michigan State Normal		–		3	–	4	–	0
Heidelberg		–		2	–	3	–	1
Western State Normal		–		2	–	3	–	0
Loyola (IL)		–		2	–	5	–	0

The 1911 Detroit Tigers football team was an American football team that represented the University of Detroit in the 1911 college football season. In its first season under head coach Royal R. Campbell, the team compiled a 4–4 record and was outscored by its opponents by a combined total of 53 to 41.

In January 1911, the school changed its name from "Detroit College" to the "University of Detroit".

== Schedule ==
Date	Opponent	Site	Result	Source
September 28	Assumption (ON)		W 8–0	
	Grand Rapids Central High School		W 5–0	
October 14	Olivet	D. A. C. Field; Detroit, MI	L 0–6	
October 21	Kalamazoo	D. A. C. Field; Detroit, MI	L 6–8	
October 28	Hillsdale	Detroit, MI	L 5–6	
November 4	at Alma	Alma, MI	L 0–28	
November 9	at Michigan State Normal	Ypsilanti, MI	W 6–0	
November 30	at Loyola (IL)	Chicago, IL	W 11–5	
