= 1911 St. Viator football team =

American college football season

1911 St. Viator football
- Conference: Independent
- Record: 5–2
- Head coach: Albert G. Quille (1st season)
- Captains: Cleary (left halfback); Bergen (fullback)

1911 Midwestern college football independents records
	Conf.			Overall
Team	W	L	T	W		L		T
Marquette		–		7	–	0	–	2
Notre Dame		–		6	–	0	–	2
Fairmount		–		7	–	1	–	0
South Dakota		–		7	–	1	–	0
Michigan Agricultural		–		5	–	1	–	0
Northern Illinois State		–		8	–	2	–	1
Saint Louis		–		6	–	1	–	1
Lake Forest		–		5	–	1	–	1
Mount Union		–		7	–	2	–	0
Michigan		–		5	–	1	–	2
North Dakota Agricultural		–		3	–	1	–	0
St. Viator		–		4	–	2	–	0
Haskell		–		4	–	2	–	3
Iowa State Teachers		–		3	–	2	–	1
Ohio Northern		–		5	–	4	–	0
Detroit		–		4	–	4	–	0
Central Michigan		–		3	–	3	–	0
South Dakota State		–		4	–	4	–	0
St. Mary's (OH)		–		3	–	3	–	1
Wabash		–		3	–	3	–	1
Buchtel		–		3	–	4	–	1
Butler		–		3	–	4	–	1
Carthage		–		3	–	4	–	1
Doane		–		3	–	4	–	0
Michigan State Normal		–		3	–	4	–	0
Heidelberg		–		2	–	3	–	1
Western State Normal		–		2	–	3	–	0
Loyola (IL)		–		2	–	5	–	0

The 1911 St. Viator football team represented St. Viator College during the 1911 college football season. The team compiled a 4–2 record, but were outscored 71 to 47 by their opponents.

== Schedule ==
Date	Opponent	Site	Result	Source
September 30	at Grand Prairie Seminary (IL)	Onarga, IL	W 22–0	
October 14	at Notre Dame	Cartier Field; Notre Dame, IN	L 0–43	
October 21	Chicago All-Stars	Bergin Field; Bourbonnais, IL	W 8–0	
October 28	at Morgan Park Military Academy	Chicago, IL	L 0–28	
November 11	Loyola (IL)	Bergin Field; Bourbonnais, IL	W 6–0	
November 30	at DePaul	Chicago, IL	W 11–0	
