= 1911 Butler Christians football team =

American college football season

1911 Butler Christians football
- Conference: Independent
- Record: 3–4–1
- Head coach: Dave Allerdice (1st season)
- Captain: G. Cullen Thomas
- Home stadium: Washington Park

1911 Midwestern college football independents records
	Conf.			Overall
Team	W	L	T	W		L		T
Marquette		–		7	–	0	–	2
Notre Dame		–		6	–	0	–	2
Fairmount		–		7	–	1	–	0
South Dakota		–		7	–	1	–	0
Michigan Agricultural		–		5	–	1	–	0
Northern Illinois State		–		8	–	2	–	1
Saint Louis		–		6	–	1	–	1
Lake Forest		–		5	–	1	–	1
Mount Union		–		7	–	2	–	0
Michigan		–		5	–	1	–	2
North Dakota Agricultural		–		3	–	1	–	0
St. Viator		–		4	–	2	–	0
Haskell		–		4	–	2	–	3
Iowa State Teachers		–		3	–	2	–	1
Ohio Northern		–		5	–	4	–	0
Detroit		–		4	–	4	–	0
Central Michigan		–		3	–	3	–	0
South Dakota State		–		4	–	4	–	0
St. Mary's (OH)		–		3	–	3	–	1
Wabash		–		3	–	3	–	1
Buchtel		–		3	–	4	–	1
Butler		–		3	–	4	–	1
Carthage		–		3	–	4	–	1
Doane		–		3	–	4	–	0
Michigan State Normal		–		3	–	4	–	0
Heidelberg		–		2	–	3	–	1
Western State Normal		–		2	–	3	–	0
Loyola (IL)		–		2	–	5	–	0

The 1911 Butler Christians football team represented Butler University as an independent during the 1911 college football season. Butler compiled a record of 3–4–1. Dave Allerdice began the season at the team's head coach, but left Butler after the team's first game in early October to become the head football coach at University of Texas at Austin, succeeding Billy Wasmund, who died as a result of a fall. Walter Gipe coached Butler for the remainder of the season. Butler credits the entire season to Allerdice.

== Schedule ==
Date	Time	Opponent	Site	Result	Source
October 7	2:50 p.m.	Franklin (IN)	Washington Park; Indianapolis, IN	W 19–0	
October 14	2:30 p.m.	Transylvania	Washington Park; Indianapolis, IN	T 0–0	
October 21		at Notre Dame	Cartier Field; Notre Dame, IN	L 0–27	
October 28		Moores Hill	Washington Park; Indianapolis, IN	W 45–0	
November 4		at Cincinnati	Carson Field; Cincinnati, OH	L 11–23	
November 11		at Earlham	Reid Field; Richmond, IN	L 6–39	
November 18		DePauw	Washington Park; Indianapolis, IN	W 3–0	
November 30		Rose Polytechnic	Washington Park; Indianapolis, IN	L 6–10	
All times are in Eastern time
