= 1911 South Dakota Coyotes football team =

American college football season

1911 South Dakota Coyotes football
- Conference: Independent
- Record: 7–1
- Head coach: James Henderson (1st season)
- Captain: Clifford Coffey
- Home stadium: University field

1911 Midwestern college football independents records
	Conf.			Overall
Team	W	L	T	W		L		T
Marquette		–		7	–	0	–	2
Notre Dame		–		6	–	0	–	2
Fairmount		–		7	–	1	–	0
South Dakota		–		7	–	1	–	0
Michigan Agricultural		–		5	–	1	–	0
Northern Illinois State		–		8	–	2	–	1
Saint Louis		–		6	–	1	–	1
Lake Forest		–		5	–	1	–	1
Mount Union		–		7	–	2	–	0
Michigan		–		5	–	1	–	2
North Dakota Agricultural		–		3	–	1	–	0
St. Viator		–		4	–	2	–	0
Haskell		–		4	–	2	–	3
Iowa State Teachers		–		3	–	2	–	1
Ohio Northern		–		5	–	4	–	0
Detroit		–		4	–	4	–	0
Central Michigan		–		3	–	3	–	0
South Dakota State		–		4	–	4	–	0
St. Mary's (OH)		–		3	–	3	–	1
Wabash		–		3	–	3	–	1
Buchtel		–		3	–	4	–	1
Butler		–		3	–	4	–	1
Carthage		–		3	–	4	–	1
Doane		–		3	–	4	–	0
Michigan State Normal		–		3	–	4	–	0
Heidelberg		–		2	–	3	–	1
Western State Normal		–		2	–	3	–	0
Loyola (IL)		–		2	–	5	–	0

The 1911 South Dakota Coyotes football team was an American football team that represented the University of South Dakota as an independent during the 1911 college football season. In its first season under head coach James Henderson, the Coyotes compiled a 7–1 record. The team's captain was Clifford Coffey.

== Schedule ==
Date	Time	Opponent	Site	Result	Attendance	Source
September 29		Yankton	Vermillion, SD	W 35–0		
October 7	3:00 p.m.	at Minnesota	Northrop Field; Minneapolis, MN	L 0–5	3,500	
October 14		at South Dakota State	Brookings, SD (rivalry)	W 15–6		
October 21		Bellevue College	Vermillion, SD	W 45–0		
October 28		at Denver	Denver, CO	W 10–0		
November 4		at Creighton	Omaha, NE	W 31–3		
November 13		Dakota Wesleyan	University field; Vermillion, SD	W 3–0		
November 30		at Morningside	Sioux City, IA	W 22–0		
