= 1911 South Dakota State football team =

American college football season

1911 South Dakota State football
- Conference: Independent
- Record: 4–4
- Head coach: Fred Johnson (1st season)
- Captain: Clayton Pence

1911 Midwestern college football independents records
	Conf.			Overall
Team	W	L	T	W		L		T
Marquette		–		7	–	0	–	2
Notre Dame		–		6	–	0	–	2
Fairmount		–		7	–	1	–	0
South Dakota		–		7	–	1	–	0
Michigan Agricultural		–		5	–	1	–	0
Northern Illinois State		–		8	–	2	–	1
Saint Louis		–		6	–	1	–	1
Lake Forest		–		5	–	1	–	1
Mount Union		–		7	–	2	–	0
Michigan		–		5	–	1	–	2
North Dakota Agricultural		–		3	–	1	–	0
St. Viator		–		4	–	2	–	0
Haskell		–		4	–	2	–	3
Iowa State Teachers		–		3	–	2	–	1
Ohio Northern		–		5	–	4	–	0
Detroit		–		4	–	4	–	0
Central Michigan		–		3	–	3	–	0
South Dakota State		–		4	–	4	–	0
St. Mary's (OH)		–		3	–	3	–	1
Wabash		–		3	–	3	–	1
Buchtel		–		3	–	4	–	1
Butler		–		3	–	4	–	1
Carthage		–		3	–	4	–	1
Doane		–		3	–	4	–	0
Michigan State Normal		–		3	–	4	–	0
Heidelberg		–		2	–	3	–	1
Western State Normal		–		2	–	3	–	0
Loyola (IL)		–		2	–	5	–	0

The 1911 South Dakota State football team was an American football team that represented South Dakota State College of Agriculture and Mechanic Arts—now known as South Dakota State University—as an independent during the 1911 college football season. In its first and only season under head coach Fred Johnson, the team compiled a 4–4 record and was outscored by opponents by a total of 89 to 60. Halfback Clayton Pence was elected team captain at the conclusion of the previous season.

== Schedule ==
Date	Time	Opponent	Site	Result	Source
October 7	3:10 p.m.	Northern Normal	Brookings, SD	W 12–0	
October 14		South Dakota	Brookings, SD (rivalry)	L 6–15	
October 23	3:00 p.m.	at Huron	Huron, SD	W 11–0	
October 28		North Dakota Agricultural	Brookings, SD (rivalry)	W 14–3	
November 3		South Dakota Mines	Brookings, SD	W 17–3	
November 11		at Marquette	Milwaukee, WI	L 0–16	
November 20		at Yankton	Yankton, SD	L 0–30	
November 30	3:10 p.m.	Dakota Wesleyan	Mitchell, SD	L 0–22	
