= 1911 Saint Louis Billikens football team =

American college football season

1911 Saint Louis Billikens football
- Conference: Independent
- Record: 7–1–2
- Head coach: John R. Bender (2nd season)
- Captain: Earl H. Painter
- Home stadium: University campus

1911 Midwestern college football independents records
	Conf.			Overall
Team	W	L	T	W		L		T
Marquette		–		7	–	0	–	2
Notre Dame		–		6	–	0	–	2
Fairmount		–		7	–	1	–	0
South Dakota		–		7	–	1	–	0
Michigan Agricultural		–		5	–	1	–	0
Northern Illinois State		–		8	–	2	–	1
Saint Louis		–		6	–	1	–	1
Lake Forest		–		5	–	1	–	1
Mount Union		–		7	–	2	–	0
Michigan		–		5	–	1	–	2
North Dakota Agricultural		–		3	–	1	–	0
St. Viator		–		4	–	2	–	0
Haskell		–		4	–	2	–	3
Iowa State Teachers		–		3	–	2	–	1
Ohio Northern		–		5	–	4	–	0
Detroit		–		4	–	4	–	0
Central Michigan		–		3	–	3	–	0
South Dakota State		–		4	–	4	–	0
St. Mary's (OH)		–		3	–	3	–	1
Wabash		–		3	–	3	–	1
Buchtel		–		3	–	4	–	1
Butler		–		3	–	4	–	1
Carthage		–		3	–	4	–	1
Doane		–		3	–	4	–	0
Michigan State Normal		–		3	–	4	–	0
Heidelberg		–		2	–	3	–	1
Western State Normal		–		2	–	3	–	0
Loyola (IL)		–		2	–	5	–	0

The 1911 Saint Louis Billikens football team was an American football team that represented Saint Louis University as an independent during the 1911 college football season. In their second and final season under head coach John R. Bender, the Billikens compiled a 7–1–2 record.

== Schedule ==
Date	Time	Opponent	Site	Result	Attendance	Source
September 23	11:30 a.m.	Shurtleff	University campus; St. Louis, MO	W 11–0		
September 30		Cape Girardeau Normal	University campus; St. Louis, MO	W 21–3	1,000	
October 7	3:00 p.m.	Drury	University campus; St. Louis, MO	W 12–0	600	
October 14		at Illinois	Illinois Field; Champaign, IL	L 0–9		
October 21	3:00 p.m.	DePauw	University campus; St. Louis, MO	T 0–0		
October 28		Missouri Mines	University campus; St. Louis, MO	W 24–6	2,000	
November 4	3:00 p.m.	Haskell	University campus; St. Louis, MO	W 16–0	1,600	
November 18	2:30 p.m.	Missouri	University campus; St. Louis, MO	W 5–0	7,500	
November 25		Springfield Normal	University campus; St. Louis, MO	W 28–0	200	
November 30	2:30 p.m.	Syracuse	University campus; St. Louis, MO	T 6–6	10,000	
