= 1911 Fairmount Wheatshockers football team =

American college football season

1911 Fairmount Wheatshockers football
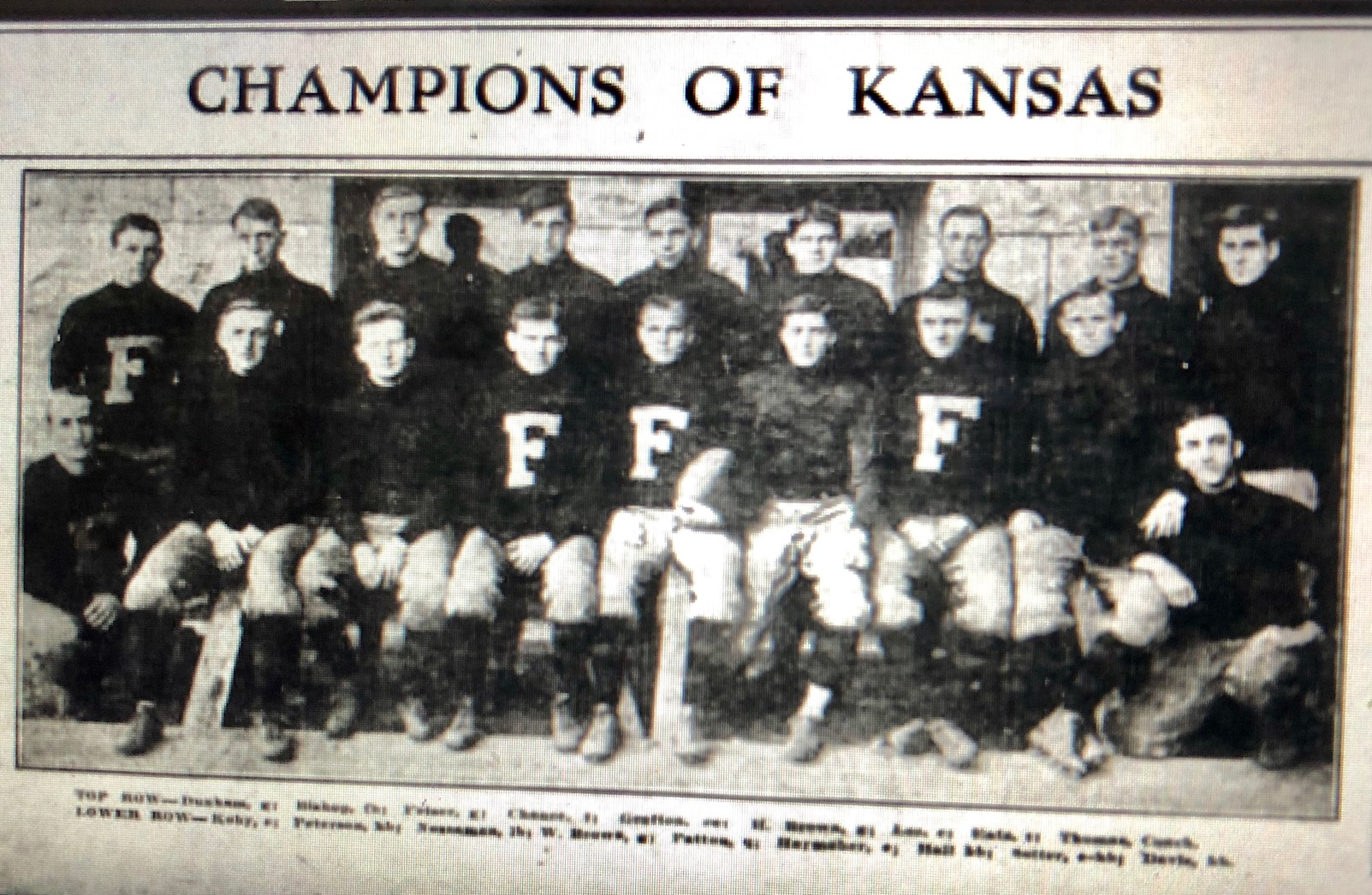

Kansas state champion
- Conference: Independent
- Record: 7–1
- Head coach: Roy K. Thomas (3rd season)

1911 Midwestern college football independents records
| | Conf. | | | Overall |
| Team | W | L | T | W | | L | | T |
|---|---|---|---|---|---|---|---|---|
| Marquette | | – | | 7 | – | 0 | – | 2 |
| Notre Dame | | – | | 6 | – | 0 | – | 2 |
| Fairmount | | – | | 7 | – | 1 | – | 0 |
| South Dakota | | – | | 7 | – | 1 | – | 0 |
| Michigan Agricultural | | – | | 5 | – | 1 | – | 0 |
| Northern Illinois State | | – | | 8 | – | 2 | – | 1 |
| Saint Louis | | – | | 6 | – | 1 | – | 1 |
| Lake Forest | | – | | 5 | – | 1 | – | 1 |
| Mount Union | | – | | 7 | – | 2 | – | 0 |
| Michigan | | – | | 5 | – | 1 | – | 2 |
| North Dakota Agricultural | | – | | 3 | – | 1 | – | 0 |
| St. Viator | | – | | 4 | – | 2 | – | 0 |
| Haskell | | – | | 4 | – | 2 | – | 3 |
| Iowa State Teachers | | – | | 3 | – | 2 | – | 1 |
| Ohio Northern | | – | | 5 | – | 4 | – | 0 |
| Detroit | | – | | 4 | – | 4 | – | 0 |
| Central Michigan | | – | | 3 | – | 3 | – | 0 |
| South Dakota State | | – | | 4 | – | 4 | – | 0 |
| St. Mary's (OH) | | – | | 3 | – | 3 | – | 1 |
| Wabash | | – | | 3 | – | 3 | – | 1 |
| Buchtel | | – | | 3 | – | 4 | – | 1 |
| Butler | | – | | 3 | – | 4 | – | 1 |
| Carthage | | – | | 3 | – | 4 | – | 1 |
| Doane | | – | | 3 | – | 4 | – | 0 |
| Michigan State Normal | | – | | 3 | – | 4 | – | 0 |
| Heidelberg | | – | | 2 | – | 3 | – | 1 |
| Western State Normal | | – | | 2 | – | 3 | – | 0 |
| Loyola (IL) | | – | | 2 | – | 5 | – | 0 |

The 1911 Fairmount Wheatshockers football team was an American football team that represented Fairmount College (now known as Wichita State University) as an independent during the 1911 college football season. In its third and final season under head coach Roy K. Thomas, the team compiled a 7–1 record. The team was recognized as the Kansas state champion for 1911.

== Schedule ==
| Date | Opponent | Site | Result | Source |
|---|---|---|---|---|
| September 30 | Cooper | Wichita, KS | W 23–5 | |
| October 14 | Washburn | Association Park; Wichita, KS | W 22–0 | |
| October 21 | Kansas State Normal | Wichita, KS | W 9–5 | |
| October 28 | at Kansas State | Ahearn Field; Manhattan, KS | L 5–9 | |
| November 3 | at College of Emporia | Emporia, KS | W 24–17 | |
| November 10 | Baker | Wichita, KS | W 6–5 | |
| November 18 | Southwestern (KS) | Wichita, KS | W 17–0 | |
| November 30 | Ottawa (KS) | Wichita, KS | W 3–0 | |
