= Roy K. Thomas =

American sports coach (1887–1977)

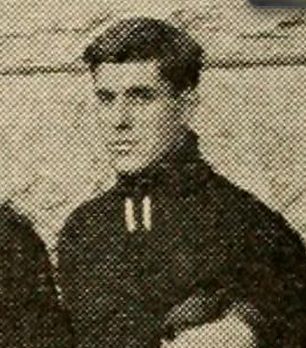
- Thomas pictured at Fairmount, c. 1911

Biographical details
- Born: June 16, 1887; Lime Lake, Leelanau County, Michigan, U.S.
- Died: May 23, 1977 (aged 89); Northport, Michigan, U.S.
- Education: Olivet College (B.A., 1909)

Playing career

Football
- 1905–1908: Olivet

Basketball
- 1905–1908: Olivet
- Position: Halfback (football)

Coaching career (HC unless noted)

Football
- 1909–1911: Fairmount
- 1913: Ohio Wesleyan

Basketball
- 1909–1912: Fairmount

Baseball
- 1909–1912: Fairmount

Head coaching record
- Overall: 17–15–2

Accomplishments and honors

Awards
- Olivet College Athletic Hall of Fame (1972)

Roy Kehl Thomas (June 16, 1887 – May 23, 1977) was an American college football, college basketball, and college baseball coach. He was the seventh head football coach at Fairmount College—now known as Wichita State University—serving for three seasons, from 1909 to 1911, and compiling a record of 15–8–2. Thomas coached the football team at Ohio Wesleyan University in 1913.

Thomas was born on June 16, 1887, at Lime Lake in Leelanau County, Michigan. He attended Olivet College—now known as University of Olivet—in Olivet, Michigan, where he captained the football and basketball teams, and was a record-setting distance runner. Thomas earned Bachelor of Arts and Legum Doctor degree from Olivet and did post-graduate work at the University of Chicago Law School. Thomas was hired as the physical director at Fairmount in 1909, succeeding Willis Bates. In 1913, he was named football, basketball, and baseball coach at Ohio Wesleyan, succeeding M. B. Banks.

Thomas later practiced law and was a trust officer for City National Bank in Chicago. He died on May 23, 1977, at Leelanau Memorial Hospital in Northport, Michigan, following a long illness.

== Head coaching record ==
=== Football ===
Year	Team	Overall	Conference	Standing	Bowl/playoffs
Fairmount Wheatshockers (Independent) (1909–1911)
1909	Fairmount	2–5–1			
1910	Fairmount	6–2–1			
1911	Fairmount	7–1			
Fairmount:		15–8–2			
Ohio Wesleyan (Ohio Athletic Conference) (1913)
1913	Ohio Wesleyan	2–7	1–6	11th	
Ohio Wesleyan:		2–7	1–6		
Total:		17–15–2			
