= 1911 Western State Normal Hilltoppers football team =

American college football season

1911 Western State Normal Hilltoppers football
- Conference: Independent
- Record: 2–3
- Head coach: William H. Spaulding (5th season)
- Captain: Glenn Mayer
- Home stadium: Woodward Avenue grounds

1911 Midwestern college football independents records
	Conf.			Overall
Team	W	L	T	W		L		T
Marquette		–		7	–	0	–	2
Notre Dame		–		6	–	0	–	2
Fairmount		–		7	–	1	–	0
South Dakota		–		7	–	1	–	0
Michigan Agricultural		–		5	–	1	–	0
Northern Illinois State		–		8	–	2	–	1
Saint Louis		–		6	–	1	–	1
Lake Forest		–		5	–	1	–	1
Mount Union		–		7	–	2	–	0
Michigan		–		5	–	1	–	2
North Dakota Agricultural		–		3	–	1	–	0
St. Viator		–		4	–	2	–	0
Haskell		–		4	–	2	–	3
Iowa State Teachers		–		3	–	2	–	1
Ohio Northern		–		5	–	4	–	0
Detroit		–		4	–	4	–	0
Central Michigan		–		3	–	3	–	0
South Dakota State		–		4	–	4	–	0
St. Mary's (OH)		–		3	–	3	–	1
Wabash		–		3	–	3	–	1
Buchtel		–		3	–	4	–	1
Butler		–		3	–	4	–	1
Carthage		–		3	–	4	–	1
Doane		–		3	–	4	–	0
Michigan State Normal		–		3	–	4	–	0
Heidelberg		–		2	–	3	–	1
Western State Normal		–		2	–	3	–	0
Loyola (IL)		–		2	–	5	–	0

The 1911 Western State Normal Hilltoppers football team represented Western State Normal School (later renamed Western Michigan University) as an independent during the 1911 college football season. In their fifth season under head coach William H. Spaulding, the Hilltoppers compiled a 2–3 record and outscored their opponents, 110 to 59. Fullback Glenn Mayer was the team captain.

== Schedule ==
Date	Time	Opponent	Site	Result	Source
October 14		at Hillsdale	Hillsdale, MI	L 6–14	
October 20		Albion	Woodward Avenue grounds; Kalamazoo, MI	L 5–12	
October 28		at Culver Military Academy	Culver, IN	L 3–27	
November 4		at Hope	Holland, MI	W 34–0	
November 11	2:30 p.m.	Battle Creek Training School	Woodward Avenue grounds; Kalamazoo, MI	W 62–6	
