= 1911 Haskell Indians football team =

American college football season

1911 Haskell Indians football
- Conference: Independent
- Record: 4–2–3
- Head coach: A. R. Kennedy (1st season)
- Captain: Willie Williams
- Home stadium: Haskell Field

1911 Midwestern college football independents records
	Conf.			Overall
Team	W	L	T	W		L		T
Marquette		–		7	–	0	–	2
Notre Dame		–		6	–	0	–	2
Fairmount		–		7	–	1	–	0
South Dakota		–		7	–	1	–	0
Michigan Agricultural		–		5	–	1	–	0
Northern Illinois State		–		8	–	2	–	1
Saint Louis		–		6	–	1	–	1
Lake Forest		–		5	–	1	–	1
Mount Union		–		7	–	2	–	0
Michigan		–		5	–	1	–	2
North Dakota Agricultural		–		3	–	1	–	0
St. Viator		–		4	–	2	–	0
Haskell		–		4	–	2	–	3
Iowa State Teachers		–		3	–	2	–	1
Ohio Northern		–		5	–	4	–	0
Detroit		–		4	–	4	–	0
Central Michigan		–		3	–	3	–	0
South Dakota State		–		4	–	4	–	0
St. Mary's (OH)		–		3	–	3	–	1
Wabash		–		3	–	3	–	1
Buchtel		–		3	–	4	–	1
Butler		–		3	–	4	–	1
Carthage		–		3	–	4	–	1
Doane		–		3	–	4	–	0
Michigan State Normal		–		3	–	4	–	0
Heidelberg		–		2	–	3	–	1
Western State Normal		–		2	–	3	–	0
Loyola (IL)		–		2	–	5	–	0

The 1911 Haskell Indians football team was an American football team that represented the Haskell Indian Institute (now known as Haskell Indian Nations University) as an independent during the 1911 college football season. In its first season under head coach A. R. Kennedy, Haskell compiled a 4–2–3 record. The team played its four home games at Haskell Field in Lawrence, Kansas. Left tackle Willie Williams was the team captain.

== Schedule ==
Date	Time	Opponent	Site	Result	Attendance	Source
October 14		at Campbell (KS)	Holton, KS	W 3–0		
October 21		at Washburn	Washburn grounds; Topeka, KS	L 3–28		
October 27		William Jewell	Haskell Field; Lawrence, KS	T 6–6		
November 4	3:00 p.m.	at Saint Louis	University campus; St. Louis, MO	L 0–16	1,600	
November 13		at Ottawa	Ottawa, KS	T 0–0		
November 17		at Tarkio	Tarkio, MO	W 18–3		
November 25		Tigers	Haskell Field; Lawrence, KS	W 9–3		
November 30		vs. Missouri Mines	Joplin, MO	T 0–0		
December 8		Ottawa	Haskell Field; Lawrence, KS	W 50–6		
