= Alfred Bergman =

American baseball player (1889–1961)

- Second baseman
- Born: September 27, 1889; Peru, Indiana, U.S.
- Died: June 20, 1961 (aged 71); Fort Wayne, Indiana, U.S.
- Batted: Right Threw: Right

MLB debut
- August 29, 1916, for the Cleveland Indians

Last MLB appearance
- September 12, 1916, for the Cleveland Indians

MLB statistics
- Batting average: .214
- Hits: 3
- Runs: 2
- Stats at Baseball Reference

Teams
- Cleveland Indians (1916)

Alfred Henry "Big Dutch" Bergman (September 27, 1889 – June 20, 1961) was an American second baseman who played for the Cleveland Indians of Major League Baseball (MLB). He was also known for being a multi-sport college athlete at the University of Notre Dame.

== Early life and education ==
"Big Dutch" Bergman was born on September 27, 1889, in Peru, Indiana, and went on to attend the University of Notre Dame. His brother Arthur, known as "Little Dutch" also attended Notre Dame, and went on to become head coach of the Washington Redskins. His youngest brother Joe Bergman (Dutch the III) was a decorated athlete at Notre Dame and played baseball, track and football.

Bergman is the only athlete in the history of athletics at the University of Notre Dame to earn a total of eleven varsity letters, and he was also the only athlete to earn four letters twice in a single year. He played football, baseball, basketball and was a team captain on the track team. As the kickoff returner for the football team in 1911, Bergman set a presently unbreakable record with a 105-yard return against Loyola; at the time the fields were 110 yards long. Three years later, Bergman became the starting quarterback for Jesse Harper's 1914 team, which finished the season with six wins and two losses. During the 1914 season, Bergman was named All-American quarterback.

== Professional baseball career ==
After graduation, Bergman played baseball for the Peru Greys, owned by his father. He then played professional baseball for one season with the Cleveland Indians. He signed with the Indians in late August, and made his Major League Baseball debut on August 29, 1916, and played second base for the team for eight games. A month later, he returned to his home in Indiana, two weeks after playing his final game on September 12. In eight games, Bergman had three hits in 14 at-bats, as well as a triple.

== War service ==
In 1917, Bergman enrolled in officers' training camp and was commissioned as a captain for World War I. In August 1917, he received a contract offer to finish out the season with the Brooklyn Dodgers, but declined the offer since he was about to report to Fort Benjamin Harrison for training.

Bergman left the service in 1919 and became a plant manager at the American Stationery company in Peru, Indiana.

== Personal life and death ==
In 1918, Bergman married Elizabeth Horn. They had two sons. He died in Fort Wayne, Indiana, on June 20, 1961.
