= 1911 North Dakota Agricultural Aggies football team =

American college football season

1911 North Dakota Agricultural Aggies football
- Conference: Independent
- Record: 3–1
- Head coach: Arthur Rueber (3rd season)
- Captain: Cliff Schroeder
- Home stadium: Dacotah Field

1911 Midwestern college football independents records
	Conf.			Overall
Team	W	L	T	W		L		T
Marquette		–		7	–	0	–	2
Notre Dame		–		6	–	0	–	2
Fairmount		–		7	–	1	–	0
South Dakota		–		7	–	1	–	0
Michigan Agricultural		–		5	–	1	–	0
Northern Illinois State		–		8	–	2	–	1
Saint Louis		–		6	–	1	–	1
Lake Forest		–		5	–	1	–	1
Mount Union		–		7	–	2	–	0
Michigan		–		5	–	1	–	2
North Dakota Agricultural		–		3	–	1	–	0
St. Viator		–		4	–	2	–	0
Haskell		–		4	–	2	–	3
Iowa State Teachers		–		3	–	2	–	1
Ohio Northern		–		5	–	4	–	0
Detroit		–		4	–	4	–	0
Central Michigan		–		3	–	3	–	0
South Dakota State		–		4	–	4	–	0
St. Mary's (OH)		–		3	–	3	–	1
Wabash		–		3	–	3	–	1
Buchtel		–		3	–	4	–	1
Butler		–		3	–	4	–	1
Carthage		–		3	–	4	–	1
Doane		–		3	–	4	–	0
Michigan State Normal		–		3	–	4	–	0
Heidelberg		–		2	–	3	–	1
Western State Normal		–		2	–	3	–	0
Loyola (IL)		–		2	–	5	–	0

The 1911 North Dakota Agricultural Aggies football team was an American football team that represented North Dakota Agricultural College (now known as North Dakota State University) as an independent during the 1911 college football season. In their third year under head coach Arthur Rueber, the team compiled a 3–1 record.

== Schedule ==
Date	Opponent	Site	Result	Source
October 14	at Wahpeton	Wahpeton, ND	W 32–0	
October 21	Northern Normal	rivalry; Fargo, ND	W 59–0	
October 28	at South Dakota State	Brookings, SD (rivalry)	L 3–14	
November 4	Fargo	Dacotah Field; Fargo, ND	W 5–0	
