= Otto Carpell =

American college football player (b. 1889)

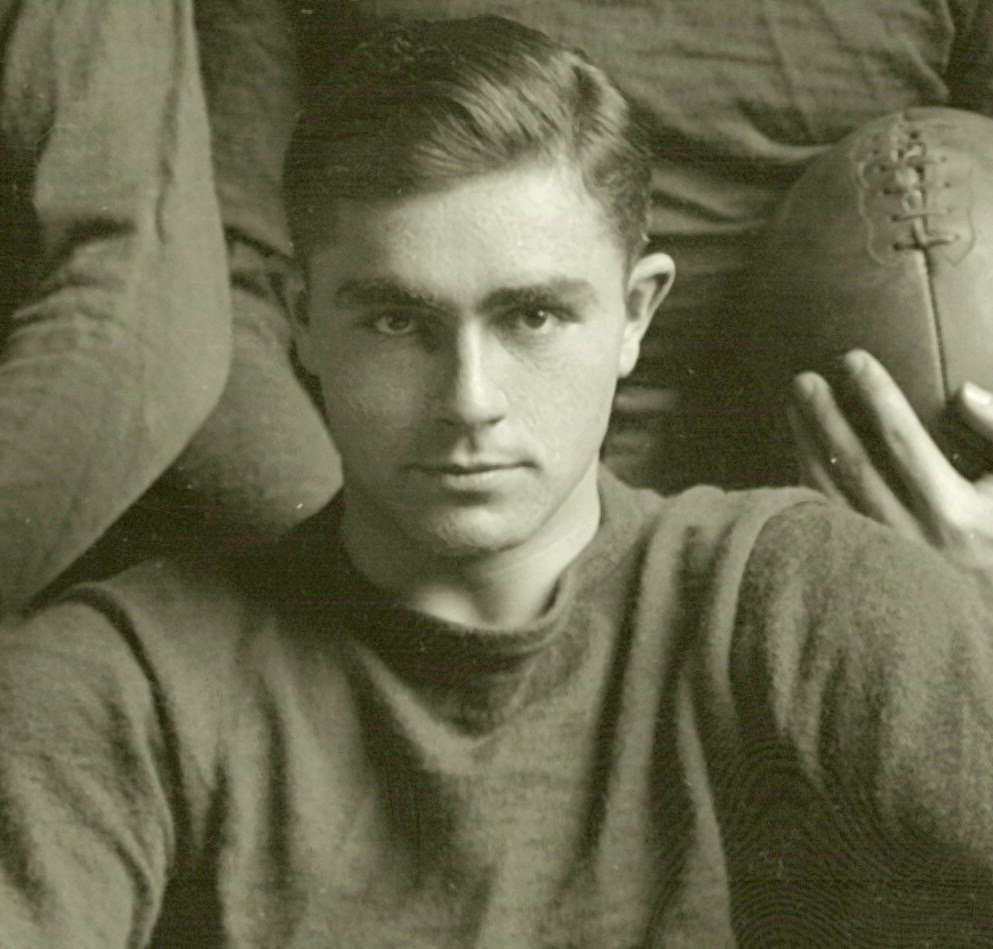
- Carpell cropped from 1912 Michigan team photograph

Biographical details
- Born: November 12, 1889; Saginaw, Michigan, U.S.
- Died: October 11, 1918 (aged 28); West Point, Mississippi, U.S.

Playing career
- 1909–1912: Michigan
- Position: Halfback

Coaching career (HC unless noted)
- 1913: Olivet
- 1914: Albion

Head coaching record
- Overall: 5–9

Accomplishments and honors

Championships
- 1 MIAA (1913)

Otto Christ Carpell (November 12, 1889 – October 11, 1918) was an American college football player for the University of Michigan. He played halfback for the Michigan Wolverines football team from 1909 to 1912. He became an aviation combat pilot during World War I and was one of four Michigan football players to be killed in the war.

Carpell was born in Saginaw, Michigan in 1889, the son of Maximillian A. and Elizabeth (Heydrich) Carpell.

Carpell enrolled at the University of Michigan and played for the Michigan Wolverines football team from 1909 to 1912 under head coach Fielding H. Yost.

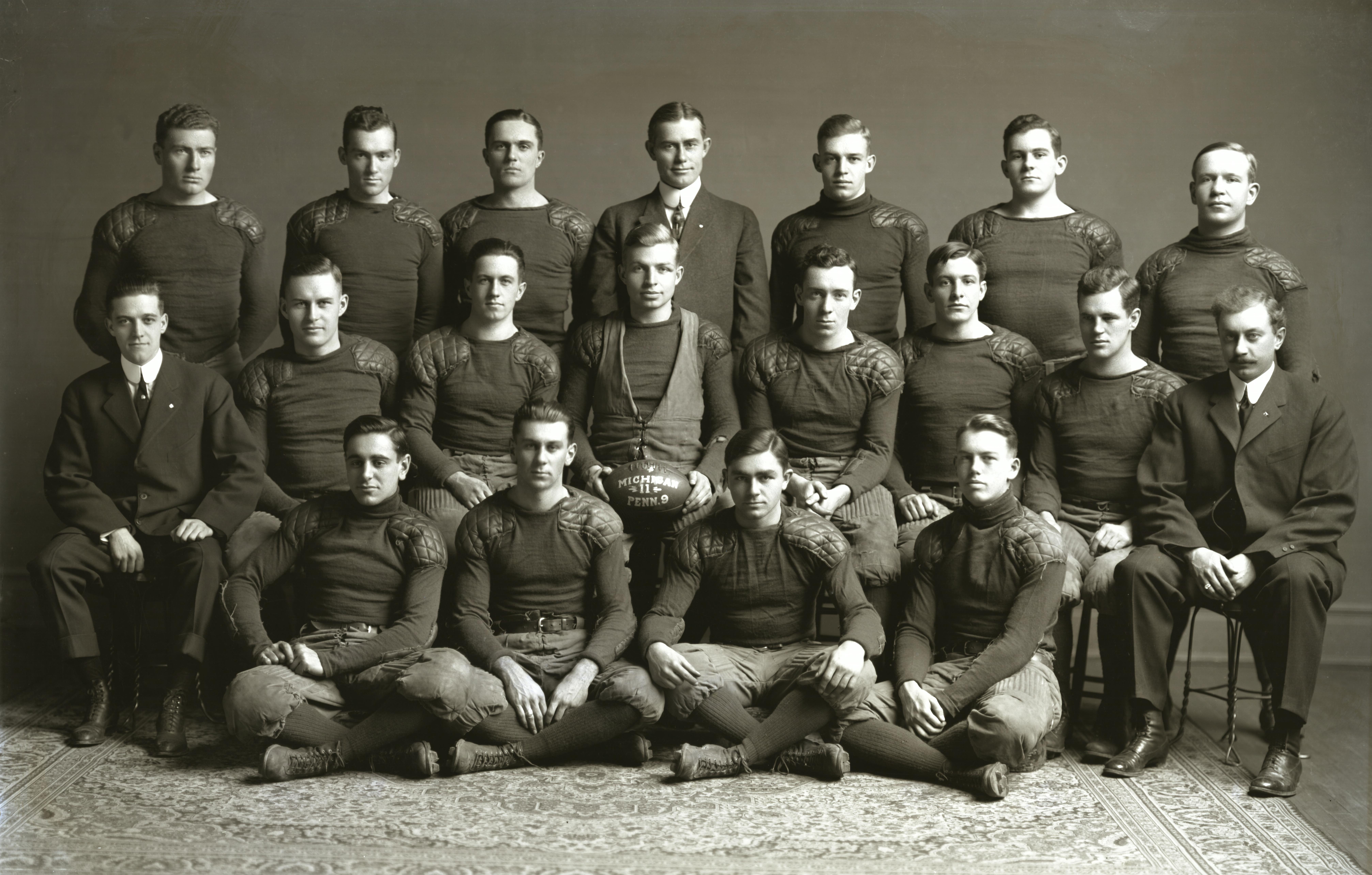
1911 Michigan Wolverines football team

After graduating from Michigan, Carpell went into the real estate brokerage business in Detroit with an office in the Penobscot Building. He served as the head football coach at Olivet College in Olivet, Michigan in 1913 and Albion College in Albion, Michigan in 1914.

Following the United States entry into World War I, Carpell was inducted into the United States Army on December 1, 1917. He was assigned to the Pilot Aviation Section and transferred to Berkeley, California, and then Dallas, Texas for training. Carpell attained the rank of second lieutenant, Aviation Section, Signal Corps, US Army, and received his commission as aviation combat pilot following his graduation from the School of Military Aeronautics at Columbus, Ohio. On January 1, 1918, he announced his engagement to Beatrice Merriam of Detroit. In October 1918, he died of a cause variously reported as heart failure or pneumonia following an outbreak of Spanish influenza while serving at Payne Field in West Point, Mississippi. In November 1921, a bronze memorial tablet was unveiled at Michigan's football stadium to honor Carpell and three other Michigan football players who died while serving in World War I. The others included Curtis Redden and Efton James.

== Head coaching record ==
| Year | Team | Overall | Conference | Standing | Bowl/playoffs |
|---|---|---|---|---|---|
Olivet Crimson (Michigan Intercollegiate Athletic Association) (1913)
| 1913 | Olivet | 4–3 | 3–1 | 1st | |
| Olivet: | | 4–3 | 3–1 | | |
Albion Methodists (Michigan Intercollegiate Athletic Association) (1914)
| 1914 | Albion | 1–6 | 1–4 | 4th | |
| Albion: | | 5–9 | 1–4 | | |
| Total: | | 5–9 | | | |
National championship Conference title Conference division title or championship game berth
