= H. Beach Carpenter =

Hiram Beach Carpenter (April 19, 1892 – September 27, 1955) was an American lawyer and sugar executive who was president of the American Sugar Refining Company. He also served as mayor of Scarsdale, New York.

== Early life ==
Carpenter was born in Rockford, Illinois on April 19, 1892 to Murray M. and Martha (Beach) Carpenter. He attended the University of Michigan, where he was a member of the Michigan Wolverines football team and editor of The Michigan Daily. He received his bachelor's degree in 1915 and graduated from Columbia Law School in 1917. He served in the United States Navy during World War I. After the war, he worked in the office of the legislative counsel of the United States Senate.

== American Sugar Refining Company ==
In 1920, Carpenter joined the legal department of American Sugar Refining Company. In 1929, he was appointed general counsel, succeeding Joseph F. Abbott, who became president. He was given the title of vice president in 1941 and elected to the board of directors in 1948. He was named president in 1953, but Abbott remained the company's chief executive. He was promoted to vice chairman the following year, a position he held until his death on September 27, 1955.

== Mayor of Scarsdale ==
In 1942, Carpenter was appointed to the Scarsdale board of trustees to fill a vacancy. He was mayor of Scarsdale from 1945 to 1947 and oversaw the village's adoption of a pay-as-you-go tax plan.

Political offices
Preceded by John K. Starkweather	Mayor of Scarsdale, New York; 1945–1947	Succeeded by Samuel E. Darby Jr.
Business positions
Preceded by Joseph F. Abbott	President of American Sugar Refining Company; 1953–1954	Succeeded by William F. Oliver
