= 1911 Loyola University Chicago football team =

American college football season

1911 Loyola University Chicago football
- Conference: Independent
- Record: 2–5
- Head coach: Robert E. Harmon (1st season)
- Captains: Daniels-Brundage (quarterback); Doyle (fullback)

1911 Midwestern college football independents records
	Conf.			Overall
Team	W	L	T	W		L		T
Marquette		–		7	–	0	–	2
Notre Dame		–		6	–	0	–	2
Fairmount		–		7	–	1	–	0
South Dakota		–		7	–	1	–	0
Michigan Agricultural		–		5	–	1	–	0
Northern Illinois State		–		8	–	2	–	1
Saint Louis		–		6	–	1	–	1
Lake Forest		–		5	–	1	–	1
Mount Union		–		7	–	2	–	0
Michigan		–		5	–	1	–	2
North Dakota Agricultural		–		3	–	1	–	0
St. Viator		–		4	–	2	–	0
Haskell		–		4	–	2	–	3
Iowa State Teachers		–		3	–	2	–	1
Ohio Northern		–		5	–	4	–	0
Detroit		–		4	–	4	–	0
Central Michigan		–		3	–	3	–	0
South Dakota State		–		4	–	4	–	0
St. Mary's (OH)		–		3	–	3	–	1
Wabash		–		3	–	3	–	1
Buchtel		–		3	–	4	–	1
Butler		–		3	–	4	–	1
Carthage		–		3	–	4	–	1
Doane		–		3	–	4	–	0
Michigan State Normal		–		3	–	4	–	0
Heidelberg		–		2	–	3	–	1
Western State Normal		–		2	–	3	–	0
Loyola (IL)		–		2	–	5	–	0

The 1911 Loyola University Chicago football team represented Loyola University of Chicago as an independent during the 1911 college football season. Led by Robert E. Harmon in his first and only season as head coach, Loyola compiled a record of 2–5.

== Schedule ==
Date	Opponent	Site	Result	Source
October 21	Chicago Veterinary College	West End Park; Chicago, IL	W 17–0	
October 28	Notre Dame	Cartier Field; South Bend, IN	L 0–80	
November 4	DePaul	De Paul field; Chicago, IL	L 3–5	
November 11	St. Viator	Bergin Field; Kankakee, IL	L 0–6	
November 18	Dixon College	West End park	W 16–11	
November 24	Marquette	Milwaukee, WI	L 0–37	
November 30	Detroit	Lawndale park; Chicago, IL	L 5–11	

== Third team schedule ==
Date	Opponent	Site	Result	Source
October 21	Lady of Lourdes	Loyola campus; Chicago, IL	W 21–0	
