= George C. Thomson =

American football player, lawyer, and banker (1888–1975)

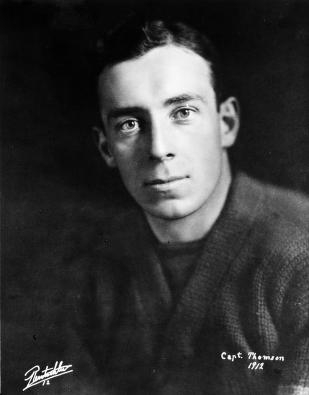

Profile
- Positions: Fullback, Punter

Personal information
- Born: April 9, 1888; Tustin, Michigan, U.S.
- Died: August 7, 1975 (aged 87); Grand Rapids, Michigan, U.S.

Career information
- College: University of Michigan

Awards and highlights
- First-team All-Western fullback, 1911; Captain, 1912 Michigan Wolverines football team

George Campbell "Bottles" Thomson (April 9, 1888 – August 7, 1975) was an American football player, lawyer and banker. He played fullback and also handled punting for the University of Michigan from 1910 to 1912. He was Michigan's leading scorer for two consecutive years, totaling 35 points for the 1911 Michigan Wolverines football team and 49 points for the 1912 team. He was also selected as a first-team All-Western fullback in 1911 and as the captain of the 1912 team. After receiving a law degree from Michigan, Thomson practiced law in Grand Rapids, Michigan. He later became affiliated with the Michigan Trust Company and served as the company's president from 1933 to 1956. Following a merger with Old Kent Bank, Thomson served as chairman of the board of the new company from 1956 to 1960.

== Early life ==
Thomson was born in April 1888 in Tustin, Osceola County, Michigan. His father, Archibald J. Thomson was a doctor educated at the University of Michigan. Thomson was raised in Cadillac, Michigan, where his father established a medical practice. He attended grade school in Cadillac and high school in Saginaw, Michigan. He played high school football at Saginaw High School.

== Michigan ==
He enrolled at the University of Michigan in 1909 as a special student. While at Michigan, he played football on the freshman team in 1909. He then became a starter at the fullback position for Fielding H. Yost's Michigan football teams in 1910, 1911 and 1912.

In November 1910, the University of Minnesota challenged Thomson's eligibility to play against the Golden Gophers in the final game of the season. The dean of Michigan's literary department was deputized to investigate. The investigation concluded that Thomson's entrance credits were "equivalent to the requirements of the literary department, though not corresponding to the precise subjects enumerated in the university calendar."

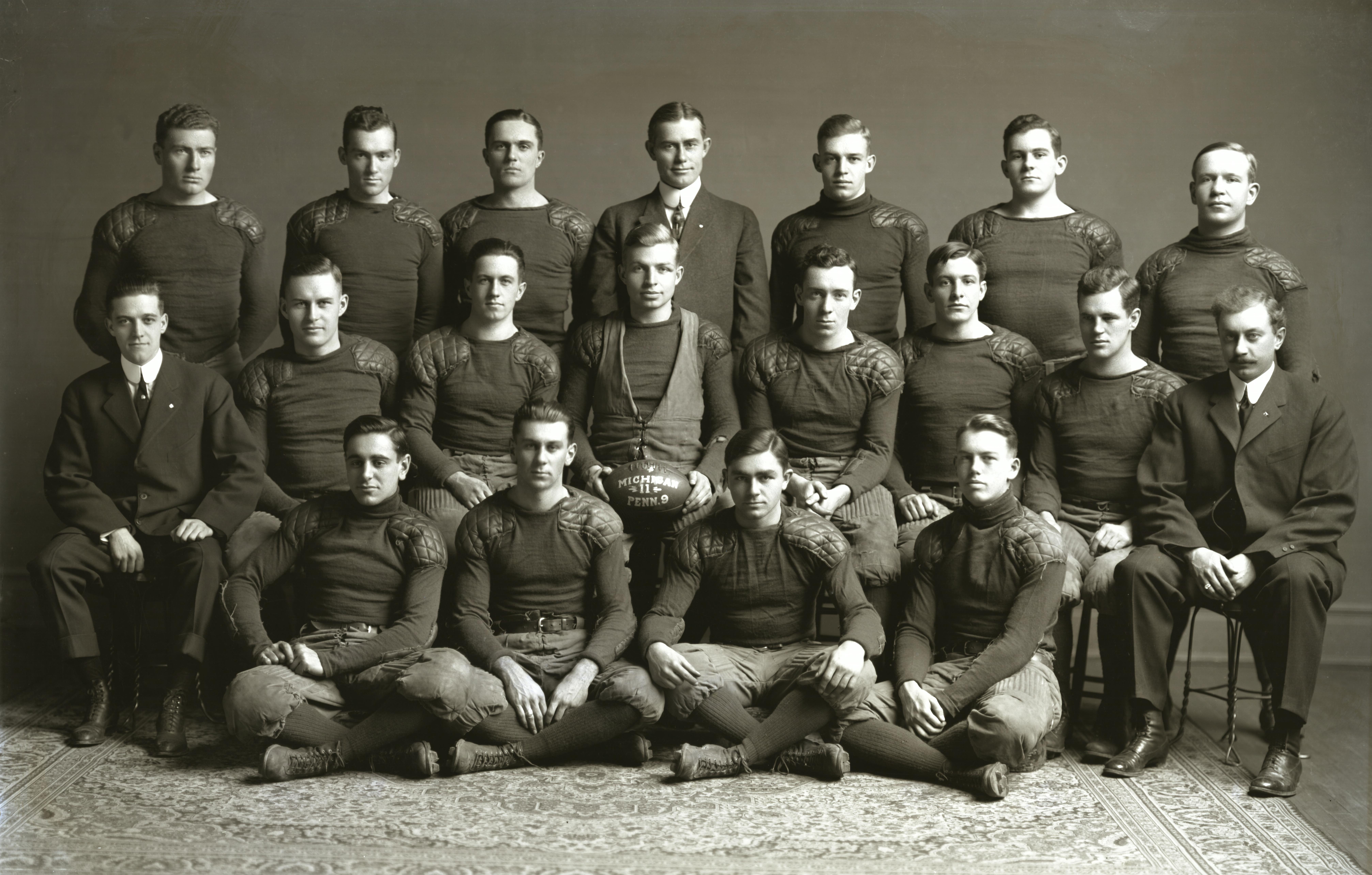
1911 Michigan Wolverines football team

As a junior, Thomson was the high scorer on the 1911 Michigan Wolverines football team with seven touchdowns in seven games for a total of 35 points. Thomson started seven of eight games in 1911. His brother died two days before the Penn game, and Thomson returned home to Cadillac, Michigan to be with his family. When it was announced the Thomson would not play against Penn, The New York Times reported: "The announcement caused heavy gloom to spread through university circles, as it was said that Thompson's [sic] absence would remove the pivot of Michigan's offensive and defensive strength."

At the end of the 1911 season, Thomson was selected as the first-team All-Western fullback both by Walter Eckersall in the Chicago Daily Tribune and by E. C. Patterson in Collier's Weekly.

At the end of November 1911, the varsity letter winners from Michigan's 1911 team unanimously elected Thomson as the captain of the 1912 Michigan Wolverines football team. Under Thomson's captaincy, the 1912 team compiled a 5–2 record. He was the team's leading scorer for the second consecutive season with 49 points on eight touchdowns and one extra point kick. In his final game for Michigan, Thomson led the Wolverines to a 20–7 win against Cornell, only the second victory in ten games against Cornell. Michigan's head coach Fielding H. Yost praised Thomson's performance against Cornell and called it Thomson's best effort. Yost also named Thomson to his 1912 All-Western team.

Thomson was a member of the Alpha Delta Phi fraternity at Michigan. He graduated from Michigan with a bachelor of law degree in 1913.

== Later life ==
Thomson was admitted to the bar in 1913 and joined the firm of Butterfield & Keeney in Grand Rapids, Michigan. He remained with that firm through September 1916.

In January 1915, Thomson married Dorothy Cummer Diggins in a ceremony in Cadillac, Michigan. After the wedding, they resided in Grand Rapids, Michigan. They had two daughters, Dorothy Anne (born c. 1917) and Evelyn (born c. 1918).

In September 1916, Thomson opened his own law practice with an office in the Michigan Trust building in Grand Rapids. At the time of the 1920 United States census, Thomson was employed as a general practice lawyer and living in Grand Rapids, Michigan, with his wife Dorothy and their two daughters. He also had two servants and a nurse living with him.

In 1927, Thomson was elected as vice president and director of the Michigan Trust Company, the oldest trust company in Michigan. At the time of the 1930 United States census, Thomson was employed as the vice president of a bank and was still living in Grand Rapids with his wife Dorothy and their two daughters. He also had a cook and a maid living with him, and his house was valued at $50,000.

From 1933 to 1956, Thomson was the president of Michigan Trust Company. Thomson also served on the board of directors of Antrim Iron Co. In 1956, Michigan Trust Company merged with Old Kent Bank and became the Old Kent Bank & Trust Co. Thomson served as the chairman of the board of the new company until his retirement at the end of 1960.

Thomson died in August 1975 in Grand Rapids.
