= 1897 St. Viateur football team =

American college football season

1897 St. Viateur football
- Conference: Independent
- Record: 3–1
- Captain: Walsh (fullback)

1897 Midwestern college football independents records
	Conf.			Overall
Team	W	L	T	W		L		T
Butler		–		3	–	0	–	0
Fairmount		–		1	–	0	–	0
Washburn		–		7	–	1	–	0
Cincinnati		–		9	–	1	–	1
Iowa State Normal		–		5	–	1	–	0
Ohio Wesleyan		–		7	–	1	–	1
Indiana		–		6	–	1	–	1
Ohio		–		7	–	2	–	0
Carthage		–		3	–	1	–	0
Iowa Agricultural		–		3	–	1	–	0
Notre Dame		–		4	–	1	–	1
Central Michigan		–		2	–	1	–	0
Baldwin–Wallace		–		2	–	1	–	1
Chicago Dental Infirmary		–		2	–	2	–	1
Lake Forest		–		4	–	5	–	1
Drake		–		2	–	3	–	0
Heidelberg		–		2	–	3	–	0
Detroit College		–		1	–	2	–	0
Indiana Normal		–		1	–	4	–	0
Kansas State		–		1	–	2	–	1
Mount Union		–		2	–	4	–	1
Rush Medical College		–		1	–	4	–	1
DePauw		–		2	–	6	–	0
Wittenberg		–		2	–	6	–	0
Haskell		–		1	–	4	–	0
Indiana State Normal		–		1	–	4	–	0
Ohio State		–		1	–	7	–	1
Lincoln (MO)		–		0	–	1	–	0
South Dakota Agricultural		–		0	–	1	–	0
Washington University		–		0	–	2	–	0
North Dakota Agricultural		–		0	–	3	–	0

The 1897 St. Viateur football team was an American football team that represented St. Viateur College in the 1897 college football season. The team compiled a 3–1 record and outscored their opponents by a total of 68 to 64.

== Schedule ==
Date	Opponent	Site	Result	Source
October 29	at Kankakee Athletic Club	Kankakee, IL	W 8–4	
November 7	Young Men's Lyceum	Bourbonnais, IL	W 36–0	
November 14	Garfield Athletic Club	Bourbonnais, IL	W 24–0	
November 20	at Notre Dame	Brownson Hall field; Notre Dame, IN	L 0–60	

== Roster ==
- Brennock, left end
- Kearney, left tackle
- Legris, left guard
- Armstrong, center
- Hawkins, right guard
- Deford, right tackle
- Paterson, right end
- Moore, left halfback
- Daniher, right halfback
- Quill, quarterback
- Walsh (captain), fullback

== Game summary ==
St. Viateur vs Notre Dame

Team	1	2	Total
St. Viateur	0	0	0
• Notre Dame	60	{{{H2}}}	60

- Date: November 20, 1897
- Location: Cartier Field, Notre Dame, Indiana
- Elapsed time: 55 minutes (30 and 25 minute halves)
- Referee: Reed

A game summary in the Daily Inter Ocean stated the contest was dull, uninteresting, and featureless. The article exclaimed, "at no stage of the game was Notre Dame's goal line in danger." One positive point mentioned by the newspaper was for St. Viateur's exemplary tackling.
