= List of Kansas State Wildcats football seasons =

The Kansas State Wildcats football team represents Kansas State University, in Manhattan Kansas. The team competes in the Big 12 Conference at the NCAA Football Bowl Subdivision level. This is a list of their annual results.

== Seasons ==
Year	Coach	Overall	Conference	Standing	Bowl/playoffs	Coaches^{#}	AP^{°}
Ira Pratt (Independent) (1896)
1896	Ira Pratt	0–1–1					
A.W. Ehrsam (Independent) (1897)
1897	A.W. Ehrsam	1–2–1					
Billy P. Williamson (Independent) (1898)
1898	Billy P. Williamson	1–1–2					
Albert Hansen (Independent) (1899)
1899	Albert Hansen	2–3					
Fay Moulton (Independent) (1900)
1900	Fay Moulton	2–4					
Wade Moore (Independent) (1901)
1901	Wade Moore	3–4–1					
Cyrus E. Dietz (Independent) (1902)
1902	Cyrus E. Dietz	2–6					
G.O. Dietz (Independent) (1903)
1903	G.O. Dietz	3–4–1					
Reuben F. Booth (Independent) (1904)
1904	Reuben F. Booth	1–6					
Mike Ahearn (Independent) (1905–1908)
1905	Mike Ahearn	6–2					
1906	Mike Ahearn	5–2					
1907	Mike Ahearn	5–3					
1908	Mike Ahearn	6–2					
Mike Ahearn (Kansas College Athletic Conference) (1909–1910)
1909	Mike Ahearn	7–2					
1910	Mike Ahearn	10–1					
Mike Ahearn:		39–12 (.765)					
Guy Lowman (Kansas College Athletic Conference) (1911–1912)
1911	Guy Lowman	5–4–1					
1912	Guy Lowman	8–2					
Guy Lowman (Missouri Valley Conference) (1913–1914)
1913	Guy Lowman	3–4–1	0–2	6th			
1914	Guy Lowman	1–5–1	0–3	7th			
Guy Lowman:		17–15–3 (.529)	0–5 (.000)				
John R. Bender (Missouri Valley Conference) (1915)
1915	John R. Bender	3–4–1	0–2–1	7th			
Zora Clevenger (Missouri Valley Conference) (1916–1919)
1916	Zora Clevenger	6–1–1	1–1–1	4th			
1917	Zora Clevenger	6–2	3–2	4th			
1918	Zora Clevenger	4–1	1–1	(Note: Due to events related to World War I and the 1918 flu pandemic, the Missouri Valley Intercollegiate Athletic Association did not schedule any official conference games, recorded no standings, and awarded no title for 1918.)			
1919	Zora Clevenger	3–5–1	0–3–1	6th			
Zora Clevenger:		19–9–2 (.667)	5–7–2 (.429)				
Charlie Bachman (Missouri Valley Conference) (1920–1927)
1920	Charlie Bachman	3–3–3	0–3–1	8th			
1921	Charlie Bachman	5–3	4–2	T–2nd			
1922	Charlie Bachman	5–1–2	3–1–2	3rd			
1923	Charlie Bachman	4–2–2	2–2–2	T–5th			
1924	Charlie Bachman	3–4–1	1–4–1	8th			
1925	Charlie Bachman	5–2–1	3–2–1	T–3rd			
1926	Charlie Bachman	5–3	2–2	6th			
1927	Charlie Bachman	3–5	2–4	8th			
Charlie Bachman:		33–23–9 (.577)	17–20–7 (.466)				
Bo McMillin (Big Six Conference) (1928–1933)
1928	Bo McMillin	3–5	0–5	6th			
1929	Bo McMillin	3–5	3–2	3rd			
1930	Bo McMillin	5–3	3–2	3rd			
1931	Bo McMillin	8–2	3–2	3rd			
1932	Bo McMillin	4–4	2–3	4th			
1933	Bo McMillin	6–2–1	4–1	2nd			
Bo McMillin:		29–21–1 (.578)	15–15 (.500)				
Pappy Waldorf (Big Six Conference) (1934)
1934	Pappy Waldorf	7–2–1	5–0	1st			
Wesley Fry (Big Six Conference) (1935–1939)
1935	Wesley Fry	2–4–3	1–2–2	4th			
1936	Wesley Fry	4–3–2	2–1–2	3rd			
1937	Wesley Fry	4–5	1–4	T–5th			
1938	Wesley Fry	4–4–1	1–3–1	5th			
1939	Wesley Fry	4–5	1–4	T–4th			
Wesley Fry:		18–21–6 (.467)	6–14–5 (.340)				
Hobbs Adams (Big Six Conference) (1940–1941)
1940	Hobbs Adams	2–7	1–4	5th			
1941	Hobbs Adams	2–5–2	1–3–1	5th			
Hobbs Adams 1.0:		4–12–2 (.278)	2–7–1 (.250)				
Ward Haylett (Big Six Conference) (1942–1944)
1942	Ward Haylett	3–8	2–3	4th			
1943	Ward Haylett	1–7	0–5	6th			
1944	Ward Haylett	2–5–2	1–4	T–5th			
Ward Haylett:		6–20–2 (.250)	3–12 (.200)				
Lud Fiser (Big Six Conference) (1945)
1945	Lud Fiser	1–7	0–5	6th			
Hobbs Adams (Big Six Conference) (1946)
1946	Hobbs Adams	0–9	0–5	6th			
Hobbs Adams (Total):		4–21–2 (.185)	2–12–1 (.167)				
Sam Francis (Big Six Conference) (1947)
1947	Sam Francis	0–10	0–5	6th			
Ralph Graham (Big Seven Conference) (1948–1950)
1948	Ralph Graham	1–9	0–6	7th			
1949	Ralph Graham	2–8	1–5	7th			
1950	Ralph Graham	1–9–1	0–6	7th			
Ralph Graham:		4–26–1 (.145)	1–17 (.056)				
Bill Meek (Big Seven Conference) (1951–1954)
1951	Bill Meek	0–9–0	0–6–0	7th			
1952	Bill Meek	1–9-1	0–6	7th			
1953	Bill Meek	6–3–1	4–2	T–2nd			
1954	Bill Meek	7–3	3–3	5th			
Bill Meek:		14–24–1 (.372)	7–17–1 (.292)				
Bus Mertes (Big Seven Conference) (1955–1959)
1955	Bus Mertes	4–6	3–3	T–3rd			
1956	Bus Mertes	3–7	2–4	T–5th			
1957	Bus Mertes	3–6–1	2–4	T–5th			
1958	Bus Mertes	3–7	2–4	5th			
1959	Bus Mertes	2–8	1–5	7th			
Bus Mertes:		15–34–1 (.310)	10–20 (.333)				
Doug Weaver (Big Eight Conference) (1960–1966)
1960	Doug Weaver	1–9	0–7	8th			
1961	Doug Weaver	2–8	0–7	8th			
1962	Doug Weaver	0–10	0–7	8th			
1963	Doug Weaver	2–7	1–5	7th			
1964	Doug Weaver	3–7	3–4	T–5th			
1965	Doug Weaver	0–10	0–7	8th			
1966	Doug Weaver	0–9–1	0–6–1	T–7th			
Doug Weaver:		8–60–1 (.123)	4–43–1 (.094)				
Vince Gibson (Big Eight Conference) (1967–1974)
1967	Vince Gibson	1–9	0–7	8th			
1968	Vince Gibson	4–6	2–5	T–6th			
1969	Vince Gibson	5–5	3–4	T–5th			
1970	Vince Gibson	6–5	5–2	T–2nd			
1971	Vince Gibson	5–6	2–5	T–5th			
1972	Vince Gibson	3–8	1–6	8th			
1973	Vince Gibson	5–6	2–5	T–6th			
1974	Vince Gibson	4–7	1–6	T–7th			
Vince Gibson:		33–52 (.388)	16–40 (.286)				
Ellis Rainsberger (Big Eight Conference) (1975–1977)
1975	Ellis Rainsberger	3–8	0–7	8th			
1976	Ellis Rainsberger	1–10	0–7	8th			
1977	Ellis Rainsberger	2–9	0–7	8th			
Ellis Rainsberger:		6–27 (.182)	0–21 (.000)				
Jim Dickey (Big Eight Conference) (1978–1985)
1978	Jim Dickey	4–7	3–4	T–5th			
1979	Jim Dickey	3–8	1–6	8th			
1980	Jim Dickey	4–7	2–5	6th			
1981	Jim Dickey	2–9	1–6	8th			
1982	Jim Dickey	6–5–1	3–3–1	4th	L Independence		
1983	Jim Dickey	3–8	1–6	8th			
1984	Jim Dickey	3–7–1	2–4–1	T–5th			
1985	Jim Dickey (Note: Eighth-year head coach Jim Dickey was forced to resign after opening the season with two consecutive losses including one to an NCAA Division I-AA team. Assistant athletic director Lee Moon took over as interim coach for the rest of the season.)	1–10	1–6	T–7th			
Jim Dickey:		26–61–2 (.303)	13–41–2 (.250)				
Stan Parrish (Big Eight Conference) (1986–1988)
1986	Stan Parrish	2–9	1–6	7th			
1987	Stan Parrish	0–10–1	0–6–1	T–7th			
1988	Stan Parrish	0–11	0–7	8th			
Stan Parrish:		2–30–1 (.076)	1–19–1 (.071)				
Bill Snyder (Big Eight Conference) (1989–1995)
1989	Bill Snyder	1–10	0–7	8th			
1990	Bill Snyder	5–6	2–5	T–6th			
1991	Bill Snyder	7–4	4–3	4th			
1992	Bill Snyder	5–6	2–5	T–6th			
1993	Bill Snyder	9–2–1	4–2–1	3rd	W Copper	18	20
1994	Bill Snyder	9–3	5–2	3rd	L Aloha	16	19
1995	Bill Snyder	10–2	5–2	T–2nd	W Holiday	6	7
Bill Snyder (Big 12 Conference) (1996–2005)
1996	Bill Snyder	9–3	6–2	3rd (North)	L Cotton	17	17
1997	Bill Snyder	11–1	7–1	2nd (North)	W Fiesta^{†}	7	8
1998	Bill Snyder	11–2	8–0	1st (North)	L Alamo	9	10
1999	Bill Snyder	11–1	7–1	T–1st (North)	W Holiday	6	6
2000	Bill Snyder	11–3	6–2	T–1st (North)	W Cotton	8	9
2001	Bill Snyder	6–6	3–5	T–4th (North)	L Insight.com		
2002	Bill Snyder	11–2	6–2	2nd (North)	W Holiday	6	7
2003	Bill Snyder	11–4	6–2	1st (North)	L Fiesta^{†}	13	14
2004	Bill Snyder	4–7	2–6	T–5th (North)			
2005	Bill Snyder	5–6	2–6	6th (North)			
Bill Snyder 1.0:		136–68–1 (.666)	75–53–1 (.585)				
Ron Prince (Big 12 Conference) (2006–2008)
2006	Ron Prince	7–6	4–4	T–2nd (North)	L Texas		
2007	Ron Prince	5–7	3–5	4th (North)			
2008	Ron Prince	5–7	2–6	T–4th (North)			
Ron Prince:		17–20 (.459)	9–15 (.375)				
Bill Snyder (Big 12 Conference) (2009–2018)
2009	Bill Snyder	6–6	4–4	T–2nd (North)			
2010	Bill Snyder	7–6	3–5	T–3rd (North)	L Pinstripe		
2011	Bill Snyder	10–3	7–2	2nd	L Cotton	16	15
2012	Bill Snyder	11–2	8–1	T–1st	L Fiesta^{†}	11	12
2013	Bill Snyder	8–5	5–4	5th	W Buffalo Wild Wings		
2014	Bill Snyder	9–4	7–2	3rd	L Alamo	18	18
2015	Bill Snyder	6–7	3–6	8th	L Liberty		
2016	Bill Snyder	9–4	6–3	4th	W Texas		
2017	Bill Snyder	8–5	5–4	T–4th	W Cactus		
2018	Bill Snyder	5–7	3–6	T–7th			
Bill Snyder 2.0:		79–49 (.617)	51–37 (.580)				
Bill Snyder (total):		215–117–1 (.647)	126–90–1 (.583)				
Chris Klieman (Big 12 Conference) (2019–2025)
2019	Chris Klieman	8–5	5–4	T–3rd	L Liberty		
2020	Chris Klieman	4–6	4–5	7th			
2021	Chris Klieman	8–5	4–5	T–5th	W Texas		
2022	Chris Klieman	10–4	7–2	1st	L Sugar^{†}	14	14
2023	Chris Klieman	9–4	6–3	T–4th	W Pop-Tart	19	18
2024	Chris Klieman	9–4	5–4	T–8th	W Rate		
2025	Chris Klieman	6–6	5–4	T–7th			
Chris Klieman (total):		54–34 (.614)	36–27 (.571)				
Collin Klein (Big 12 Conference) (2026–present)
2026	Collin Klein	4–5	1-5				
Collin Klein (total):		4–5 (.444)	1–5 (.167)				
Total:		589–686–41 (.463)					
National championship Conference title Conference division title or championship game berth
^{†}Indicates Bowl Coalition, Bowl Alliance, BCS, or CFP / New Years' Six bowl.; ^{#}Rankings from final Coaches Poll.
