= List of Kansas State Wildcats head football coaches =

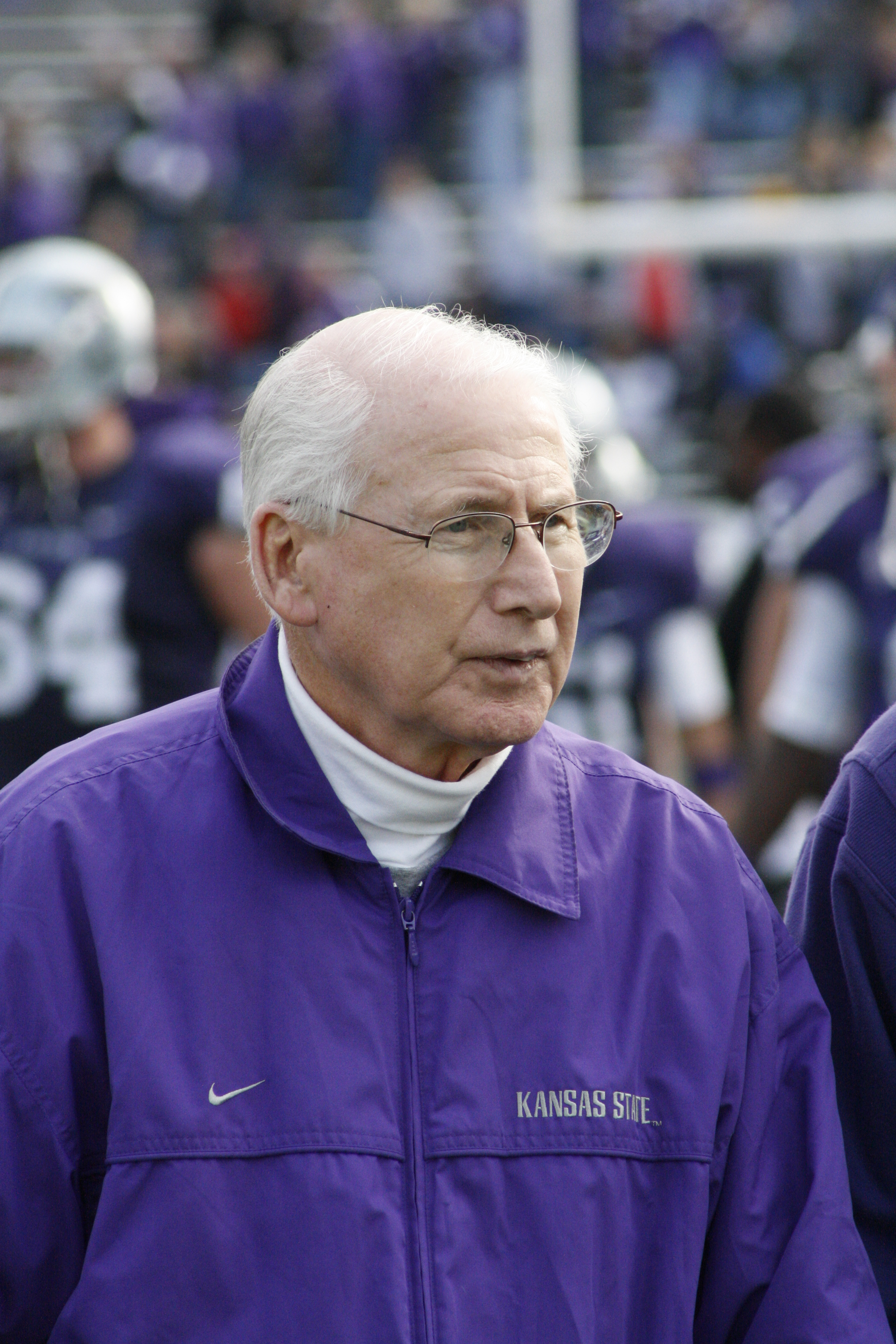
Bill Snyder, winningest head coach at Kansas State

The Kansas State Wildcats football program is a college football team that represents Kansas State University in the Big 12 Conference in the National Collegiate Athletic Association. The team has had 33 head coaches and one interim head coach since its first official football game in 1896. The current coach is Collin Klein, who was hired prior to the 2026 season.

The university adopted the nickname "Wildcats" in 1915 after being previously known as the "Aggies." Head coach Zora Clevenger changed the team's nickname to the "Farmers" from 1916 to 1919, but it was changed back to "Wildcats" permanently in 1920 by coach Charlie Bachman.

Kansas State joined the Missouri Valley Intercollegiate Athletic Association in 1913. The school split away from the MVIAA with five others to create the Big Six Conference in 1928. Through the years that conference added two teams and eventually became the Big Eight Conference. The Wildcats became a charter member of the Big 12 in 1996 when the Big Eight disbanded.

Four coaches have led Kansas State to postseason bowl games: Jim Dickey, Bill Snyder, Ron Prince and Chris Klieman. Five coaches have won conference championships with the Wildcats: Mike Ahearn (1909, 1910); Guy Lowman (1912); Pappy Waldorf (1934); Snyder (2003, 2012) and Klieman (2023).

Bill Snyder is the all-time leader in seasons coached at KSU with 27, more than triple the next highest. Snyder is also the leader in games coached (333, almost four times the next highest) and total wins (215, more than five times the next highest). Mike Ahearn has the highest overall winning percentage of any Wildcat coach, at .755 over his six seasons. Sam Francis is the worst coach in program history in terms of winning percentage, as he lost every one of the ten games he coached during his only season at Kansas State. Among coaches who served more than one season, Stan Parrish has the lowest winning percentage (.076) after completing three seasons with a record of 2–30–1. Bill Snyder, Charles Bachman and Pappy Waldorf have been inducted into the College Football Hall of Fame as coaches. Coaches Clevenger, Bo McMillin and Francis were inducted in the College Football Hall of Fame as players. Snyder is the only coach to have won major post-season national coach of the year honors while at Kansas State.

== Key ==
Key to symbols in coaches list
General		Overall		Conference		Postseason (Note: Although the first Rose Bowl Game was played in 1902, it has been continuously played since the 1916 game, and is recognized as the oldest bowl game by the NCAA. "—" indicates any season prior to 1916 when postseason games were not played.)	
No.	Order of coaches (Note: A running total of the number of head coaches, with coaches who served separate tenures being counted only once. Interim head coaches are represented with "Int" and are not counted in the running total. "—" indicates the team played but either without a coach or no coach is on record. "X" indicates an interim year without play.)	GC	Games coached	CW	Conference wins	PW	Postseason wins
DC	Division championships	OW	Overall wins	CL	Conference losses	PL	Postseason losses
CC	Conference championships	OL	Overall losses	CT	Conference ties	PT	Postseason ties
NC	National championships	OT	Overall ties (Note: Overtime rules in college football were introduced in 1996, making ties impossible in the period since.)	C%	Conference winning percentage		
†	Elected to the College Football Hall of Fame	O%	Overall winning percentage (Note: When computing the win–loss percentage, a tie counts as half a win and half a loss.)				

== Coaches ==
Statistics correct as of 2025 NCAA Division I FBS football season.

No.	Name	Term	GC	OW	OL	OT	O%	CW	CL	CT	C%	PW	PL	CCs	National Awards
1	Ira Pratt	1896	2	0	1	1	.250	—	—	—	—	—	—	—	—
2	A. W. Ehrsam	1897	4	1	2	1	.375	—	—	—	—	—	—	—	—
3	Billy P. Williamson	1898	4	1	1	2	.500	—	—	—	—	—	—	—	—
4	Albert Hansen	1899	5	2	3	0	.400	—	—	—	—	—	—	—	—
5	Fay Moulton	1900	6	2	4	0	.333	—	—	—	—	—	—	—	—
6	Wade Moore	1901	8	3	4	1	.438	—	—	—	—	—	—	—	—
7	Cyrus E. Dietz	1902	8	2	6	0	.250	—	—	—	—	—	—	—	—
8	G. O. Dietz	1903	8	3	4	1	.438	—	—	—	—	—	—	—	—
9	Reuben F. Booth	1904	7	1	6	0	.143	—	—	—	—	—	—	—	—
10	Mike Ahearn	1905–1910	51	39	12	0	.765	—	—	—	—	—	—	2 (Note: Kansas State was a member of the Kansas Intercollegiate Athletic Association prior to joining in the MVIAA in 1913.)	—
11	Guy Lowman	1911–1914	35	17	15	3	.529	0	5	0	.000	—	—	1	—
12	John R. Bender	1915	8	3	4	1	.438	0	2	1	.167	—	—	—	—
13	Zora Clevenger^{†}	1916–1919	30	19	9	2	.667	3	6	2	.364	—	—	—	—
14	Charlie Bachman^{†}	1920–1927	65	33	23	9	.577	17	21	6	.455	—	—	—	—
15	Bo McMillin^{†}	1928–1933	51	29	21	1	.578	15	15	0	.500	—	—	—	—
16	Pappy Waldorf^{†}	1934	10	7	2	1	.750	5	0	0	1.000	—	—	1	—
17	Wesley Fry	1935–1939	45	18	21	6	.467	6	14	5	.340	—	—	—	—
18	Hobbs Adams	1940–41, 1946	27	4	21	2	.185	2	12	1	.167	—	—	—	—
19	Ward Haylett	1942–1944	28	6	20	2	.250	3	12	0	.200	—	—	—	—
20	Lud Fiser	1945	8	1	7	0	.125	0	5	0	.000	—	—	—	—
21	Sam Francis^{†}	1947	10	0	10	0	.000	0	5	0	.000	—	—	—	—
22	Ralph Graham	1948–1950	31	4	26	1	.145	1	17	0	.056	—	—	—	—
23	Bill Meek	1951–1954	39	14	24	1	.372	7	17	0	.304	—	—	—	—
24	Bus Mertes	1955–1959	49	15	34	1	.310	10	20	0	.333	—	—	—	—
25	Doug Weaver	1960–1966	69	8	60	1	.123	4	43	1	.094	—	—	—	—
26	Vince Gibson	1967–1974	85	33	52	0	.388	16	40	0	.286	—	—	—	—
27	Ellis Rainsberger	1975–1977	33	6	27	0	.182	0	21	0	.000	—	—	—	—
28	Jim Dickey	1978–1985 (Note: Jim Dickey resigned at the beginning of the 1985 season, going 0–2. Lee Moon replaced him and finished the season 1–8 (1–6 in conference).)	80	24	54	2	.313	12	35	2	.265	0	1	—	—
Int	Lee Moon	1985	9	1	8	0	.111	1	6	0	.143	—	—	—	—
29	Stan Parrish	1986–1988	33	2	30	1	.076	1	19	1	.071	—	—	—	—
30	Bill Snyder^{†}	1989–2005, 2009–2018	333	215	117	1	.647	126	90	1	.583	9	10	2	AP Coach of the Year (1998); Bear Bryant Award (1998); Bobby Dodd COY (1998, 2012); Walter Camp COY (1998); Woody Hayes Trophy (2011); Sporting News COY (2011)
31	Ron Prince	2006–2008	37	17	20	—	.459	9	15	—	.375	0	1	—	—
32	Chris Klieman	2019–2025	88	54	34	—	.614	36	27	—	.571	3	2	1	—
33	Collin Klein	2025–present	0	0	0	0	N/A	0	0	0	N/A	0	0	0	—

== See also ==
- List of Kansas State University people
