= Fielding H. Yost =

American football player, coach, and administrator (1871–1946)

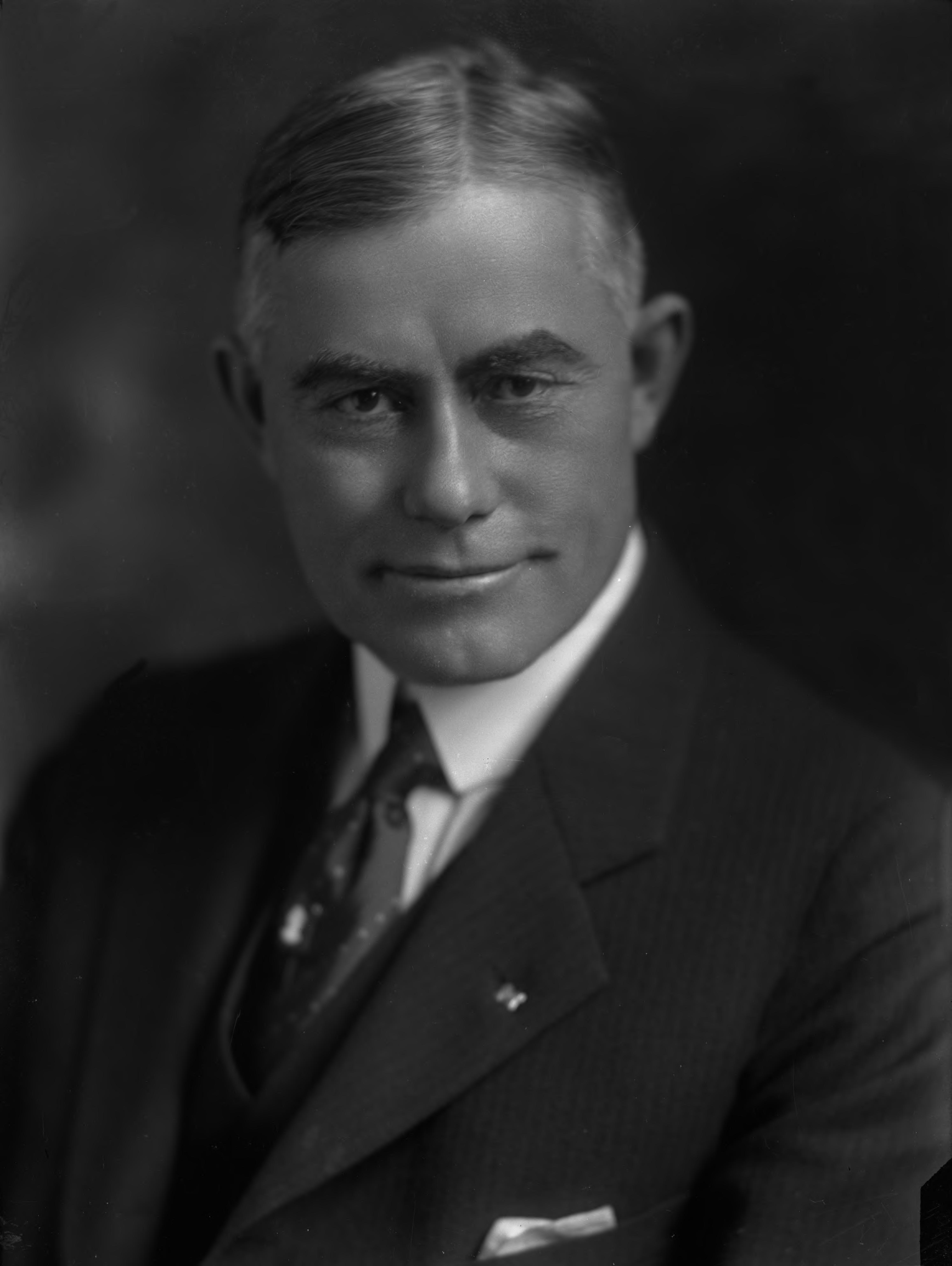
- Yost in 1918

Biographical details
- Born: April 30, 1871; Fairview, West Virginia, U.S.
- Died: August 20, 1946 (aged 75); Ann Arbor, Michigan, U.S.

Playing career
- 1894–1896: West Virginia
- 1896: Lafayette
- Position: Tackle

Coaching career (HC unless noted)
- 1897: Ohio Wesleyan
- 1898: Nebraska
- 1899: Kansas
- 1900: Stanford
- 1900: San Jose Normal
- 1901–1923: Michigan
- 1925–1926: Michigan

Administrative career (AD unless noted)
- 1921–1940: Michigan

Head coaching record
- Overall: 198–35–12
- Bowls: 1–0

Accomplishments and honors

Championships
- 6 national (1901–1904, 1918, 1923); 10 Western / Big Ten (1901–1904, 1906, 1918, 1922–1923, 1925–1926)
- College Football Hall of Fame; Inducted in 1951 (profile)

Fielding Harris Yost (/joʊst/; April 30, 1871 – August 20, 1946) was an American college football player, coach and athletics administrator. He served as the head football coach at Ohio Wesleyan University, the University of Nebraska, the University of Kansas, Stanford University, San Jose State University, and the University of Michigan, compiling a coaching career record of 198–35–12. During his 25 seasons as the head football coach at Ann Arbor, Yost's Michigan Wolverines won six national championships, captured ten Big Ten Conference titles, and amassed a record of 165–29–10.

From 1901 to 1905, his "Point-a-Minute" squads had a record of 55–1–1, outscoring their opponents by a margin of 2,821–42. The 1901 team beat Stanford, 49–0, in the 1902 Rose Bowl, the first college football bowl game. Under Yost, Michigan won four straight national championships from 1901 to 1904 and two more in 1918 and 1923.

In 1921, Yost became Michigan's athletic director and served in that capacity until 1940. He was inducted into the College Football Hall of Fame as a coach in 1951. Yost was also a successful businessman, lawyer, and author; but he is best known as a leading figure in pioneering the development of college football into a national phenomenon.

== Early life ==
Yost was born in Fairview, West Virginia, in April 1871. Yost's family had settled in West Virginia, in 1825. He was the oldest of four children of Parmenus (sometimes Permenus) Wesley Yost and Elzena Jane (Ammons) Yost, both of West Virginia. His father was a farmer and a Confederate veteran. His family had been in Fairview since 1825 when his second great grandfather, David Yost, settled there and took up a grant of over 2,000 acres.

Yost was educated in the local schools and became a deputy marshal in Fairview as a teenager. At seventeen, he earned a public-school teaching certificate.

== College ==
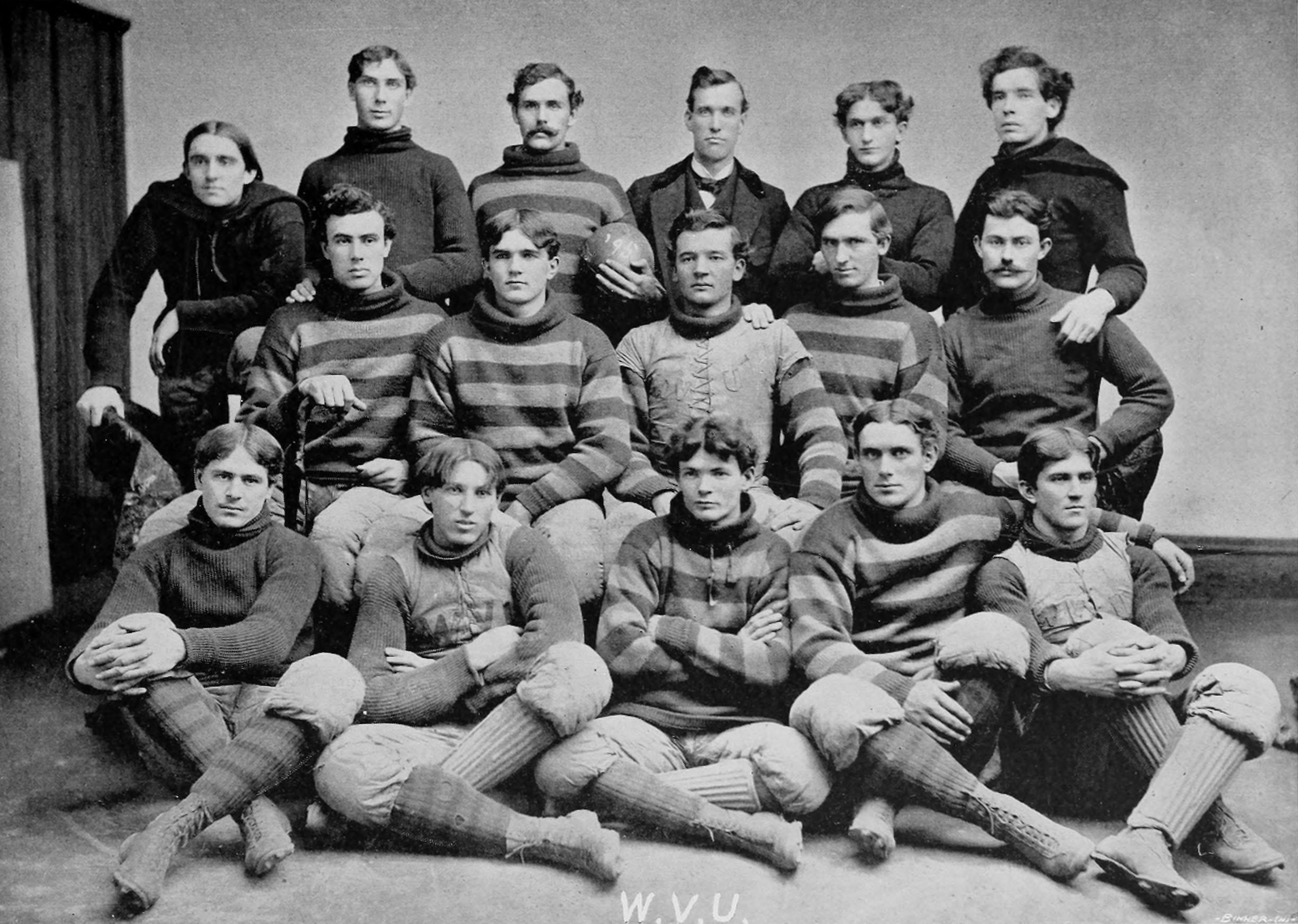
1895 West Virginia Mountaineers football team, with Yost seated the furthest-right in the middle row

Yost began his college education at Fairmont Normal School in Fairmont, West Virginia. He then taught school at Patterson Creek, West Virginia, during the 1889–90 school year.

He next enrolled at the Ohio Normal School (now known as Ohio Northern University). Yost played for the Ohio Normal baseball team. After three years at Ohio Normal, he returned to West Virginia to work in the oil fields.

In 1895, Yost enrolled at West Virginia University where he studied law, earning an LL.B. He also played football for the West Virginia Mountaineers football team. A 6-foot, 200 pounder, Yost was a standout at tackle at West Virginia into the 1896 season.

=== Joining Lafayette ===
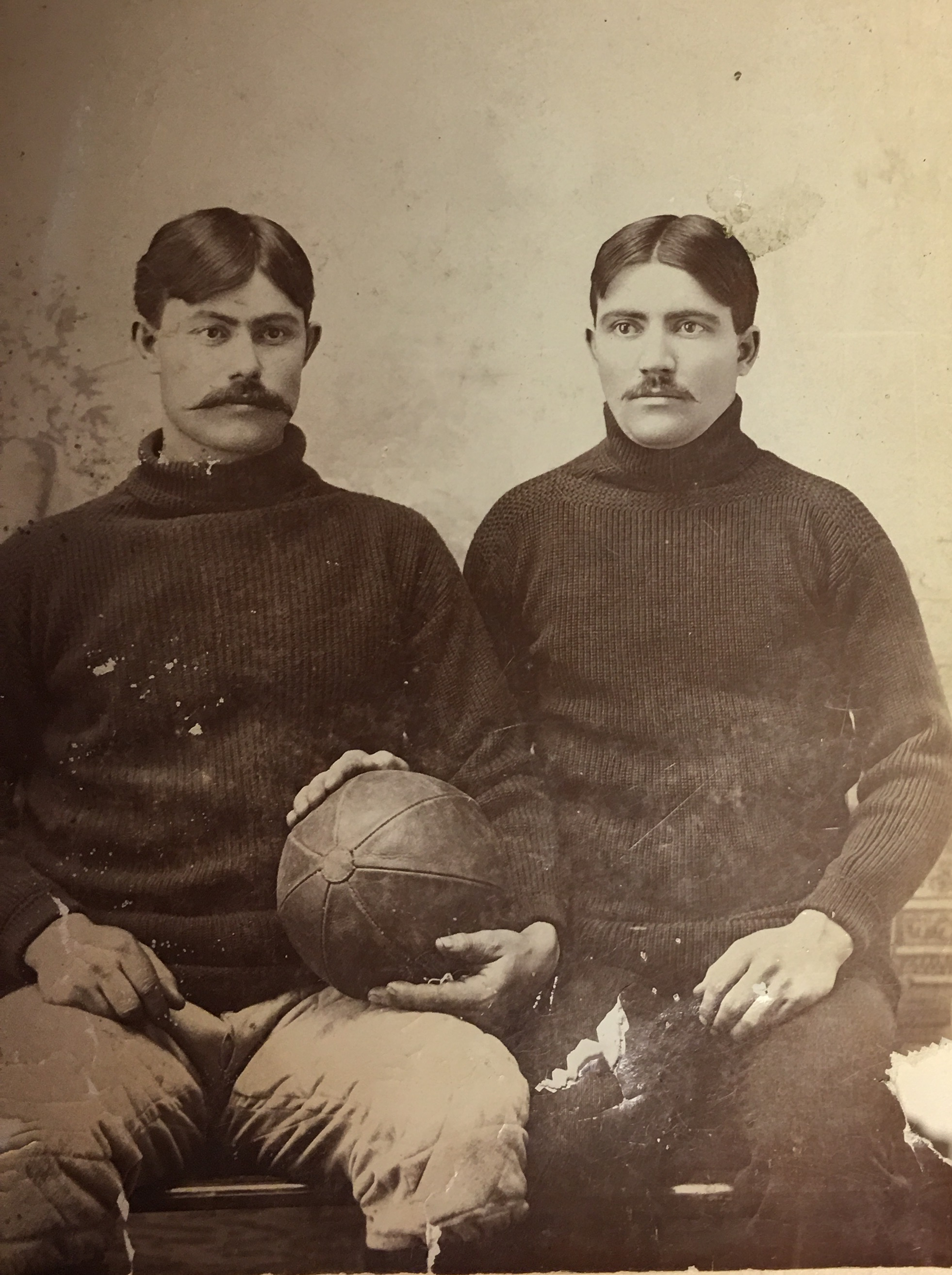
Yost (left) with a teammate c 1895 or 1896

In October 1896, after his team lost three home games to Lafayette, played on three different fields over the course of three days, he transferred in mid-season to join Coach Parke H. Davis's national championship team at Lafayette. Just a week after playing against Davis in West Virginia, Yost was playing for Davis in Lafayette's historic 6–4 win over the Penn Quakers.

The fortuitous timing of his appearance on the Lafayette roster did not go unnoticed by Penn officials. They called it "the Yost affair." The Philadelphia Ledger quoted Yost as saying that he came to Lafayette only to play football. The fact that he appeared in a Lafayette uniform only once, in the Penn game, and that he returned to West Virginia within two weeks of the contest did not help appearances. He assured all concerned that he would return to Lafayette for at least three years of study.

== Coaching career ==
=== Ohio Wesleyan ===
Yost began his coaching career at age 26 as head coach of the 1897 Ohio Wesleyan football team. Yost's team compiled a 7–1–1 record, shut out six of its nine opponents (including a 6–0 victory over Ohio State and a scoreless tie with Michigan), and outscored all opponents by a total of 144 to 32. Yost played at left tackle against Michigan, leading to a protest that Ohio Wesleyan had assured Michigan that Yost, a paid coach and non-student, would not play and had engaged in trickery by introducing another individual as Yost. One week later, Michigan announced that it would no longer schedule games against Ohio Wesleyan.

=== Nebraska ===
In 1898, Yost was hired to coach the Nebraska football team with compensation of $1,000 for 10 weeks of service. The 1898 Nebraska team compiled an 8–3 record, including victories over Iowa State (23–10), Missouri (47–6), Kansas (18–6), and Colorado (23–10), and losses to Drake (6–5) and Iowa (6–5).

=== Kansas ===
In June 1899, the University of Kansas Athletic Association offered Yost $350, and an additional $150 conditionally, to coach the school's football team. After spending the summer in Colorado, Yost arrived in Lawrence, Kansas, on September 4, 1899. During the 1899 season, the Kansas football team "lived separate from the rest of the students and ate specially selected and prepared food . . . with Coach Yost as their only mentor". The team compiled an undefeated 10–0 record, outscoring opponents 280–37. The season included victories over the Haskell Indians (12–0 and 18–0), Nebraska (36–20), and Missouri (34–6). During the 1899–1900 academic year, Kansas had Yost as its football coach and James Naismith as its basketball coach. Naismith also served as an assistant football coach during the 1899 season.

=== Stanford ===
In May 1900, Yost was hired as the football coach at Stanford University, and, after traveling home to West Virginia, he arrived in Palo Alto, California, on August 21, 1900. Yost led the 1900 Stanford team to a 7–2–1, outscoring opponents 154–20.

=== Michigan ===
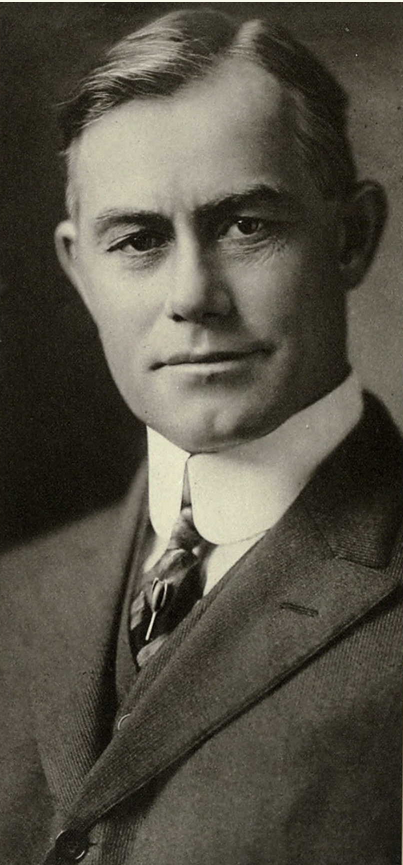
Yost from the 1915 Michiganensian

After first applying at Illinois, Yost was hired in 1901 by Charles A. Baird as the head football coach for the Michigan Wolverines football team.

Yost coached at Michigan from 1901 through 1923, and again in 1925 and 1926. He was highly successful at Michigan, winning 165 games, losing only 29, and tying 10 for a winning percentage of .833. Under Yost, Michigan won four straight national championships from 1901 to 1904 and two more in 1918 and 1923.

==== Point-a-minute ====
Yost's first Michigan team in 1901 outscored its opposition by a margin of 550–0 en route to a perfect season and victory in the inaugural Rose Bowl on January 1, 1902, over Stanford, the team Yost had coached the year before. From 1901 to 1904, Michigan did not lose a game, and was tied only once in a legendary game with the Minnesota Golden Gophers that led to the establishment of the Little Brown Jug trophy. Yost's teams used the short punt formation. He also developed a play called "Old 83" resembling an option.

Before Michigan finally lost a game to Amos Alonzo Stagg's Chicago Maroons squad at the end of the 1905 season, they had gone 56 straight games without a defeat, the second longest such streak in college football history. During their first five seasons under Yost, Michigan outscored its opponents 2,821–42, earning the Michigan team the nickname "Point-a-Minute." The team featured running back Willie Heston, who Yost called the greatest player he ever saw. (Note: Yost's all-time All-America backfield was Heston, Walter Eckersall, Jim Thorpe, and Elmer Oliphant.)

In 1904, Germany Schulz stood up from the center position and created the position of linebacker. Yost was horrified at first, but came to see the wisdom in Schulz's innovation.

==== Independent ====
In 1906, Michigan president James Burrill Angell called for a series of conference meetings to further regulate football, leading to new rules such as limiting football teams to no more than five games and players to three years of eligibility. One of the new rules would require the football coach to be a full-time employee of the university, leading to Yost's opposition to the changes. Ultimately Yost won out and convinced Michigan's board to support him over Angell and against the conference. In April 1907, Michigan was voted out of the conference for refusing to adhere to the new league rules.

In 1908, Michigan lost to Penn 29–0, the worst defeat suffered by a Michigan team during the Yost era. Yost said of Schulz's performance: "He gave the greatest one-man exhibition of courage I ever saw on a football field."

In 1909, Michigan suffered its first loss to Notre Dame. In 1910, Michigan was led by All-Americans Albert Benbrook and Stanfield Wells and played its only undefeated season of the independent years, compiling a 3–0–3 record.

In 1916, John Maulbetsch led Michigan to one of its finest records. The Wolverines won seven straight games.

==== Return to Western Conference ====
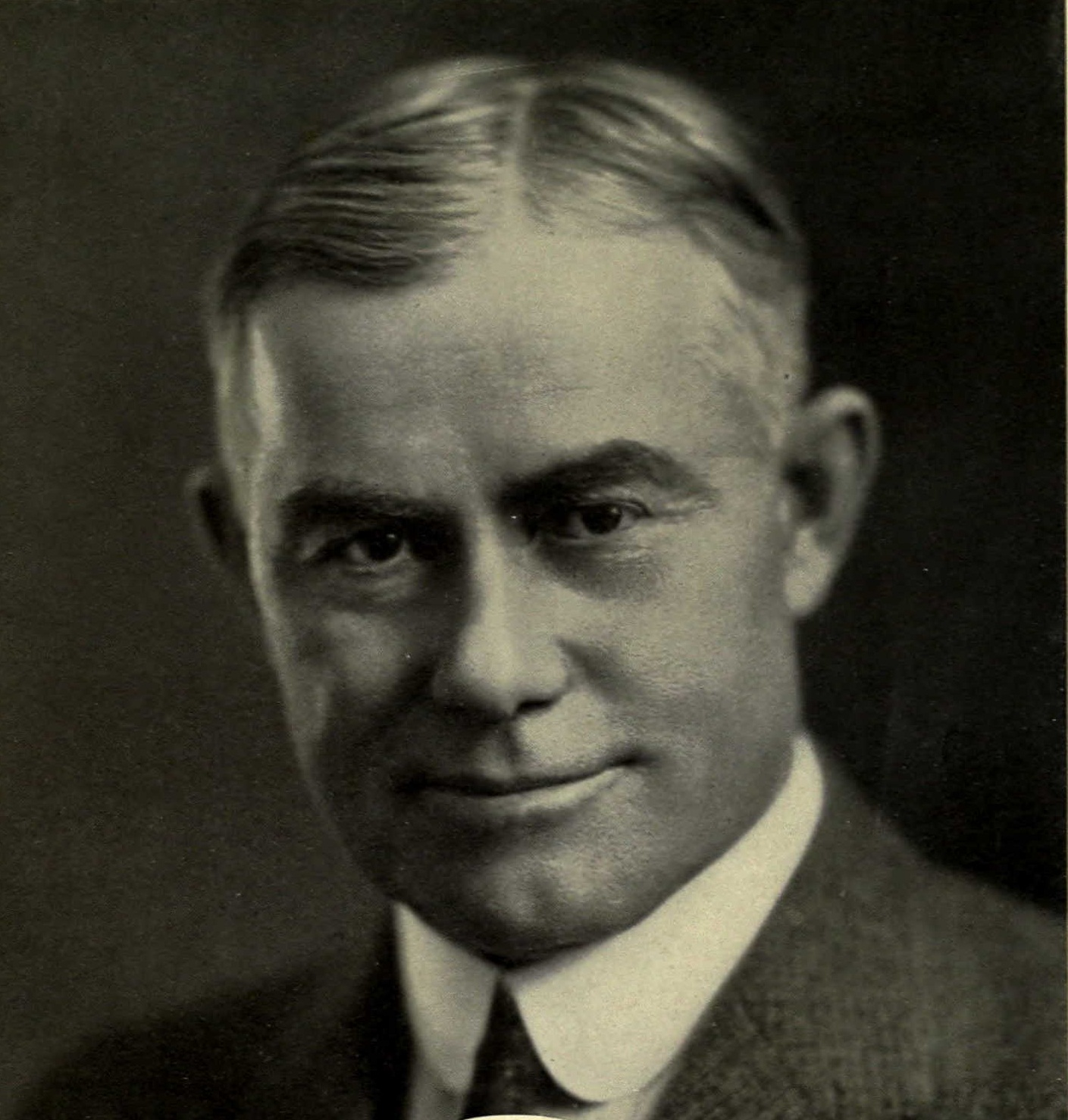
Yost from the 1928 Michiganensian

Led by fullback Frank Steketee, the 1918 team went undefeated in the war-shortened season. The 1922 and 1923 teams went undefeated, led by punter Harry Kipke. The only blemish was a tie with Yost protege and brother-in-law Dan McGugin's Vanderbilt. (Note: Yost was best man at McGugin's wedding.)

At the end of the season, Yost called the 1925 Michigan team "the greatest football team I ever coached" and "the greatest football team I ever saw in action". The team featured quarterback Benny Friedman and left end Bennie Oosterbaan, sometimes referred to as "The Benny-to-Bennie Show".

In tribute to the school where Yost began his coaching career, he arranged for Michigan to play its first game at Ferry Field (September 30, 1905) and its first game at Michigan Stadium (October 1, 1927) against Ohio Wesleyan.

== Athletic director ==
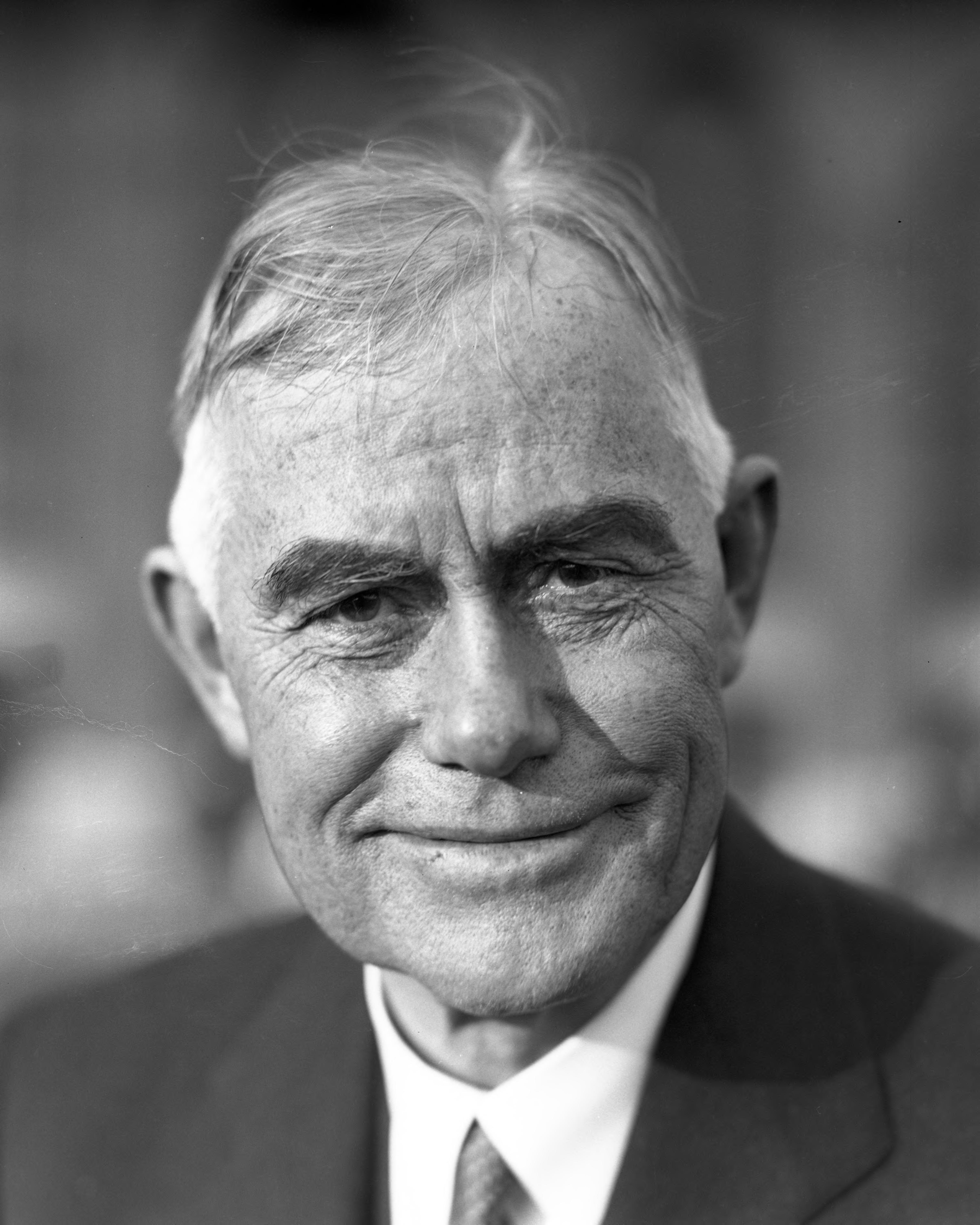
Yost c. 1938

After retiring from coaching, Yost remained at Michigan as the school's athletic director, a position he held until 1940, then held the title of athletic director emeritus. Under his leadership, Michigan Stadium, Yost Fieldhouse (now Yost Ice Arena), and the university's golf course were constructed.

== Later years and death ==
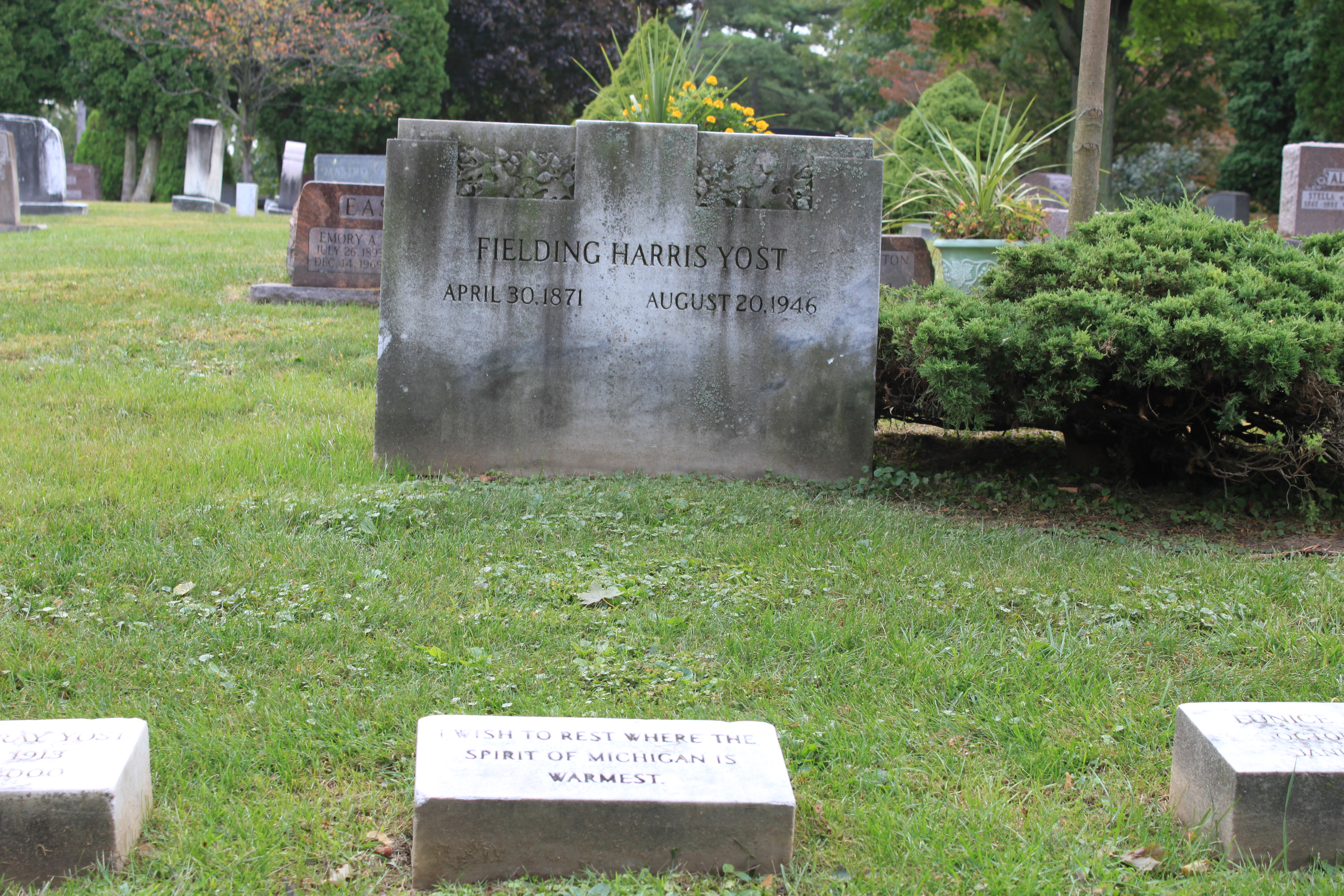
Yost's grave

Yost was in poor health for several years before his death and was hospitalized at the Battle Creek Sanitarium in May 1946. He reportedly suffered from a stroke, but was released after two weeks and returned to his home in Ann Arbor, Michigan. In August 1946, Yost died of a gall bladder attack at his home. He was survived by his wife, whom he had married in 1906, a son, Fielding H. Yost, Jr., two brothers, Ellis and Nicholas, and a sister, Mrs. Charles Barry. Yost was buried at Ann Arbor's Forest Hill Cemetery near the University of Michigan campus.

== Personal ==
A native of West Virginia, Yost's unusual pronunciation of the school's name, "MEE-she-gan," copied by long-time Michigan football broadcaster Bob Ufer, is affectionately carried on by many Michigan football fans and often referenced by ESPN sportscaster Chris Fowler.

A devout Christian, he was among the first coaches to allow Jewish players on his teams, including Joe Magidsohn and Benny Friedman. However, Murray Sperber's book Shake Down the Thunder places principal responsibility for the Big Ten blackballing and boycotting of Notre Dame on Yost. It also claims this was motivated by anti-Catholic and anti-immigrant prejudice common in the early 20th century, though John Kyrk's book Natural Enemies points out that there was a bitter feud between Yost and Knute Rockne, head coach of the Notre Dame football team.

== Legacy ==
Yost had a profound impact on the Michigan athletics department. "No other man has ever given as much heart, soul, brains, and tongue to the game he loved—football" said Grantland Rice. A longtime football coach and athletic director, his career was marked with achievement. Yost was among the inaugural class of inductees to the College Football Hall of Fame in 1951. Tommy Hughitt was heavily inspired by Yost's system and used it to great success, later adapting it to the professional game with the Youngstown Patricians and Buffalo All-Americans.

The Yost Ice Arena, the home venue of the Michigan Wolverines men's ice hockey, was named in his honor. In 2021, a committee commissioned by the University of Michigan president recommended that the school remove Yost's name from its ice hockey arena, citing a history of racial issues involving the former football coach and athletic director University of Michigan conducted an in-depth review of his career and concluded in 2021 that Yost had a "profoundly deep and negative impact on people of color" through active discrimination and upholding a segregated athletic environment. [1] (https://www.michiganpublic.org/sports/2021-05-26/fielding-yosts-racist-call-against-a-black-um-football-player-in-1934-and-the-fallout-in-2021), [2] (https://www.facebook.com/Local4/posts/report-former-u-m-football-coach-and-athletic-director-fielding-h-yost-had-profo/10159967935971002/), [3] (https://record.umich.edu/articles/committee-recommends-yost-name-for-removal-feedback-sought/).

=== Innovation ===
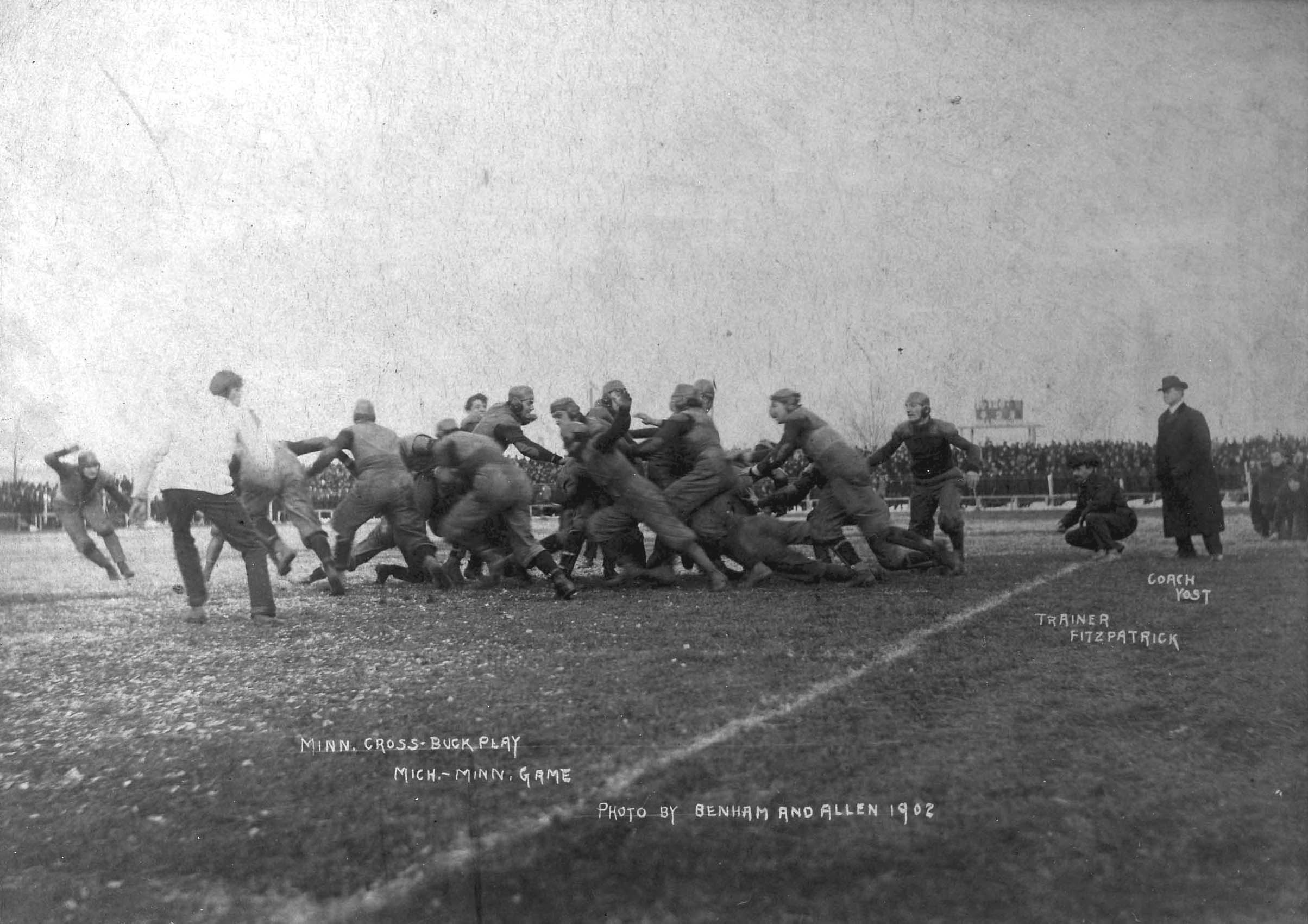
Yost (on the sideline at right) coaching Michigan against Minnesota in 1902

Yost invented the position of linebacker with center Germany Schulz; co-created the first ever bowl game, the 1902 Rose Bowl, with then legendary UM athletic director Charles Baird; invented the fieldhouse concept that bears his name; and supervised the building of the first on-campus building dedicated to intramural sports.

==== Hurry up ====
Yost was also known for a series of admonitions to his players beginning with the words, "Hurry up," for example, "Hurry up and be the first man down the field on a punt or kick-off." This inclination earned him the nickname, "Hurry up" Yost. He was also an innovator of the hurry up offense.

==== Professional coach ====
Yost initiated the concept of coaching as an actual profession near the turn of the century when he was paid as much as a UM professor. The professionalization of coaches that started with Yost and later, Walter Camp at Yale University, symbolized how serious college football was becoming, and Yost symbolized this more so than any of his peers. It was he who first articulated the now accepted premise about student-athletes in the sport that: "Football builds character."

=== Coaching tree ===
No fewer than 77 men who either played for Yost, or coached under him as an assistant, went on to become head coaches in college football; two, Benny Friedman and Tommy Hughitt, helmed teams in the National Football League (NFL). In addition Dan A. Killian, who was the head coach for the LSU Tigers (1904–1906), reportedly played quarterback on the Michigan football team under Yost, but if he did, he apparently did not qualify for a letter and is not listed below. Yost's coaching tree includes:

1. Dave Allerdice: played for Michigan (1907–1909), assistant for Michigan (1910), head coach for Butler (1911), Texas (1911–1915)
2. Ernest Allmendinger: played for Michigan (1911–1913), head coach for South Dakota School of Mines (1914)
3. George Babcock: played for Michigan (1923–1925), head coach for Akron (1926) and Cincinnati (1927–1930).
4. Ted Bank: played for Michigan (1919–1921), head coach for Idaho (1935–1940).
5. Roy Beechler: played for Michigan (1904), head coach for Mount Union (1905).
6. Jack Blott: played for Michigan (1922–1923), assistant for Michigan (1924–1933), head coach for Wesleyan Cardinals (1934–1940).
7. Thomas A. Bogle, Jr.: played for Michigan (1910–1911), head coach for DePauw (1913–1914).
8. Stanley Borleske: played for Michigan (1908–1910), head coach for North Dakota Agricultural (1919–1921, 1923–1924, 1928), Fresno State (1929–1932).
9. Alan Bovard: played for Michigan (1926–1929), head coach for Michigan Tech (1947–1956).
10. Franklin Cappon: played for Michigan (1920–1922), assistant for Michigan (1925, 1928–1937), head coach for Luther (IA) (1923–1924) and Kansas (1926–1927).
11. Otto Carpell: played for Michigan (1909–1912), head coach for Albion (1913)
12. Abe Cohn: played for Michigan (1917–1918, 1920); head coach for Whitworth (1922–1923).
13. William C. "King" Cole: played for Michigan (1902), assistant for Michigan (1904), head coach for Marietta (1903), Virginia (1905–1906), Nebraska (1907–1910).
14. James B. Craig: played for Michigan (1911–1913), head coach for Arkansas (1919).
15. Wilbur M. Cunningham: played for Michigan (1907–1910), head coach for Transylvania (1912).
16. Joe Curtis: played for Michigan (1903–1906), head coach for Tulane (1907–1908), Colorado Mines (1909).
17. James DePree: played for Michigan (1903–1904), head coach for Tennessee (1905–1906)
18. Prentiss Douglass: played for Michigan (1907–1908), assistant for Michigan (1909–1910), head coach for Kentucky (1911).
19. David L. Dunlap: played for Michigan (1901–1903, 1905), head coach for Kenyon (1906), North Dakota (1908–1911), Allegheny (1912).
20. William P. Edmunds: played for Michigan (1908–1910), head coach for West Virginia (1912), Washington University (1913–1916), Vermont (1919).
21. Benny Friedman: played for Michigan (1925–1926), head coach for New York Giants (1930) and Brooklyn Dodgers (1932) of the NFL, head coach for CCNY and Brandeis (1951–1959).
22. Joe Gembis: played for Michigan (1926–1929), head coach for Wayne State (MI) (1932–1945).
23. Herb Graver: played for Michigan (1901–1903), head coach for Marietta (1904).
24. George W. Gregory: played for Michigan (1901–1903), head coach for Kenyon (1905).
25. Thomas S. Hammond: played for Michigan (1903–1905), head coach for Ole Miss (1906).
26. Albert Hansen: played for Yost at Nebraska (1898), head coach for Kansas State (1899).
27. Albert E. Herrnstein: played for Michigan (1899–1902), head coach for Haskell Institute (1903–1904), Purdue (1905), Ohio State (1906–1909).
28. Willie Heston: played for San Jose Normal under Yost in 1900 and for Michigan (1901–1904), head coach for Drake (1905), North Carolina A&M (1906)
29. Herbert Huebel: played for Yost (1911–1912), head coach for Rose Polytechnic (1913–1914).
30. Tommy Hughitt: played for Michigan (1912–1914), head coach for Maine (1915–1916) and Buffalo All-Americans/Bison of the NFL (1920–1924).
31. Emory J. Hyde: played for Michigan in 1901, head coach for TCU (1905–1907).
32. Roy W. Johnson: played for Michigan (1919), head coach for New Mexico (1920–1930).
33. Paul Jones: played for Michigan (1901–1903), head coach for Western Reserve (1904–1905).
34. Harry Kipke: played for Michigan (1920–1923), assistant for Michigan (1924–1927), head coach for Michigan State (1928), Michigan (1929–1937).
35. James C. Knight: played for Michigan (1901), head coach for Washington (1902–1904)
36. Jesse R. Langley: played for Michigan (1904–1907), head coach for TCU (1908–1909)
37. Belford Lawson Jr.: played for Michigan (1921–1923) head coach for Jackson College (1925–1926, 1928)
38. George M. Lawton: played for Michigan (1908–1910) head coach for Detroit (1913–1914).
39. George Little, assistant for Michigan (1922–1923), head coach for Michigan (1924), Wisconsin (1925–1926).
40. Frank Longman: played for Michigan (1903–1905), head coach for Arkansas (1906–1907), Wooster (1908), Notre Dame (1909–1910)
41. Jay Mack Love: played for Michigan (1904–1905), head coach for Southwestern (KS) (1906–1907)
42. Joe Maddock, played for Michigan (1902–1903), head coach for Utah (1904–1909), Oregon (1924).
43. Paul Magoffin: played for Michigan (1904–1907), assistant for Michigan (1909), head coach for North Dakota Agricultural (1908), George Washington (1910).
44. John Maulbetsch: played for Michigan (1914–1916), head coach for Phillips (1917–1920), Oklahoma A&M (1921–1928), Marshall (1929–1930).
45. Thomas L. McFadden: played for Yost at Stanford (1900), head coach for Pacific (1901–1902), Oregon Agricultural (1903), DePauw (1904).
46. Dan McGugin: played for Michigan (1901–1902), assistant for Michigan (1903), head coach for Vanderbilt (1904–1917, 1919–1934).
47. William Melford: played for Nebraska (1898), head coach for Washburn (1899)
48. Bo Molenda: played for Michigan (1925–1926), head coach for Menlo College (1950–1969); also an assistant coach in professional football for the New York Giants 1936–1941 (interim head coach for the 1939 NFL Championship Game); Green Bay Packers (1947–1948); Chicago Hornets (1949)
49. Wade Moore: played for Yost at Kansas (1899), head coach for Kansas State (1901).
50. Fay Moulton: played for Yost at Kansas (1899), head coach for Kansas State (1900)
51. Fred Norcross: played for Michigan (1903–1905), head coach at Oregon Agricultural (1906–1908).
52. Bennie Oosterbaan: played for Michigan (1925–1927), assistant for Michigan (1928–1947), head coach for Michigan (1948–1958).
53. Bennie Owen: played for Yost at Kansas (1899), assistant for Michigan (1901), head coach for Bethany (KS) (1902–1904), Oklahoma (1905–1926).
54. Andrew G. Reid: played for Michigan (1901), head coach for Monmouth (IL) (1907–1909)
55. Curtis Redden: played for Michigan, head coach for Transylvania.
56. Walter Rheinschild: played for Michigan (1904–1907), head coach for Washington State (1908), St. Vincent (CA) (1909), Throop (1913), Occidental (1916–1917).
57. George Rich: played for Michigan (1926–1928), head coach Denison (1931–1934)
58. Thomas J. Riley: played for Michigan (1908), head coach for Maine (1911–1913), Amherst (1914–1916)
59. Tod Rockwell: played for Michigan (1923–1924), head coach for North Dakota (1926–1927), Louisiana Tech (1928–1929)
60. Frederick Schule: played for Michigan (1903), head coach for Montana (1905–1906).
61. Henry Schulte: played for Michigan (1903–1905), head coach for Eastern Michigan (1906–1908), Cape Girardeau (1909–1913), Missouri (1914–1917), Nebraska (1919–1920)
62. Germany Schulz: played for Michigan (1904–1905, 1907–1908), assistant for Michigan (1913–1915), head coach for Detroit (1922–1923).
63. Bruce Shorts: played for Michigan (1900–1901), head coach for Nevada (1904), Oregon (1905).
64. Andrew W. Smith: played for Michigan (1909), assistant coach under Yost (1911–1912), head coach at Throop College of Technology, now California Institute of Technology (1914–c. 1917)
65. Theodore M. Stuart: played for Michigan (1904–1905), head coach for Colorado School of Mines (1910–1911).
66. Everett Sweeley: played for Michigan (1899–1902), head coach for Morningside (1903), Washington State (1904–1905)
67. William I. Traeger: played for Yost at Stanford (1900), head coach for Pomona (1902) and Occidental (1903)
68. Joseph Truskowski: played for Michigan (1926–1929), head coach for Olivet (1931)
69. Leigh C. Turner: assistant for Michigan (1905), head coach for Purdue (1907)
70. Irwin Uteritz: played for Michigan (1921–1923), head coach for Washington University (1949–1952).
71. George F. Veenker: assistant for Michigan (1926–1929), head coach for Iowa State (1931–1936).
72. Billy Wasmund: played for Michigan (1907–1909), head coach for Texas (1910–1911)
73. Boss Weeks: played for Michigan (1900–1902), head coach for Kansas (1903), Beloit (1904)
74. Hugh White: played for Michigan (1898–1901), head coach for Washington University (1902)
75. Tad Wieman: played for Michigan (1915–1917, 1920), assistant for Michigan (1921–1926), head coach for Michigan (1927–1928), Princeton (1938–1942).
76. Ebin Wilson: played for Michigan (1899–1901), head coach for Wabash (1902–1903), Alma (1904–1905).
77. Hugh E. Wilson: played for Michigan (1918–1921), head coach for Louisiana Tech (1926–1927)

== Head coaching record ==
Year	Team	Overall	Conference	Standing	Bowl/playoffs
Ohio Wesleyan (Independent) (1897)
1897	Ohio Wesleyan	7–1–1			
Ohio Wesleyan:		7–1–1			
Nebraska Bugeaters (Independent) (1898)
1898	Nebraska	8–3 (Note: The NCAA football record book credits Yost with a 7–4 record coaching Nebraska in the 1898 season, incorrectly noting a 24–0 loss to William Jewell. Nebraska's records show a 38–0 victory over William Jewell on October 22, 1898, in Kansas City, Missouri, and credit Yost with an 8–3 record for the season; see 1898 Nebraska Bugeaters football team. Additionally, the NCAA does not officially credit Yost for serving as interim head coach in 1900 at State Normal School (now San Jose State University), whereas San Jose State records and numerous other sources credit Yost with a 12–0 victory over Chico State and a 1–0 record at the school. The NCAA, thus, lists Yost with a record of 196–36–12, two fewer wins and one more loss than indicated in the table above.)			
Nebraska:		8–3			
Kansas Jayhawks (Independent) (1899)
1899	Kansas	10–0			
Kansas:		10–0			
Stanford (Independent) (1900)
1900	Stanford	7–2–1			
Stanford:		7–2–1			
San Jose Normal (Independent) (1900)
1900	San Jose Normal	1–0			
San Jose Normal:		1–0			
Michigan Wolverines (Western Conference) (1901–1906)
1901	Michigan	11–0	4–0	T–1st	W Rose
1902	Michigan	11–0	5–0	T–1st	
1903	Michigan	11–0–1	3–0–1	1st	
1904	Michigan	10–0	2–0	T–1st	
1905	Michigan	12–1	2–1	T–2nd	
1906	Michigan	4–1	1–0	T–1st	
Michigan Wolverines (Independent) (1907–1916)
1907	Michigan	5–1			
1908	Michigan	5–2–1			
1909	Michigan	6–1			
1910	Michigan	3–0–3			
1911	Michigan	5–1–2			
1912	Michigan	5–2			
1913	Michigan	6–1			
1914	Michigan	6–3			
1915	Michigan	4–3–1			
1916	Michigan	7–2			
Michigan Wolverines (Big Ten Conference) (1917–1923)
1917	Michigan	8–2	0–1	T–8th	
1918	Michigan	5–0	2–0	T–1st	
1919	Michigan	3–4	1–4	T–7th	
1920	Michigan	5–2	2–2	6th	
1921	Michigan	5–1–1	2–1–1	5th	
1922	Michigan	6–0–1	4–0	T–1st	
1923	Michigan	8–0	4–0	T–1st	
Michigan Wolverines (Big Ten Conference) (1925–1926)
1925	Michigan	7–1	5–1	1st	
1926	Michigan	7–1	5–0	T–1st	
Michigan:		165–29–10	42–10–2		
Total:		198–35–12			
National championship Conference title Conference division title or championship game berth

== See also ==
- List of college football head coaches with non-consecutive tenure
- University of Michigan Athletic Hall of Honor

== Bibliography ==
- Behee, John Richard (1971). Fielding Yost's Legacy.
- Brandstatter, Jim (2005). Tales From Michigan Stadium. Vol. 2. Sports Publishing LLC. ISBN 9781582618883.
- Chengelis, Angelique (2012). 100 Things Michigan Fans Should Know and Do Before They Die. Triumph Books. ISBN 9781623680701 – via Google Books.
- Falls, Joe (1996). A Legacy of Champions: The Story of the Men Who Built University of Michigan Football. CTC Productions & Sports. ISBN 9780965467100.
- Gruver, Edward (2002). Nitschke. Lanham:Taylor Trade Publishing. ISBN 1-58979-127-4.
- Kryk, John (2015), Stagg vs. Yost: The Birth of Cutthroat Football. Rowman & Littlefield Publishers. ISBN 978-1442248267
- Onofrio, Jan (1999). West Virginia Biographical Dictionary. Somerset Publishers, Inc.
- Pope, Edwin (1955). Football's Greatest Coaches – via archive.org.
- Wheeler, Robert W. (2012). Jim Thorpe: World's Greatest Athlete. University of Oklahoma Press. ISBN 9780806187327 – via Google Books.
