= 1897 Notre Dame football team =

American college football season

1897 Notre Dame football
- Conference: Independent
- Record: 4–1–1
- Head coach: Frank E. Hering (2nd season)
- Captain: Jack Mullen
- Home stadium: Brownson Hall field

1897 Midwestern college football independents records
	Conf.			Overall
Team	W	L	T	W		L		T
Butler		–		3	–	0	–	0
Fairmount		–		1	–	0	–	0
Washburn		–		7	–	1	–	0
Cincinnati		–		9	–	1	–	1
Iowa State Normal		–		5	–	1	–	0
Ohio Wesleyan		–		7	–	1	–	1
Indiana		–		6	–	1	–	1
Ohio		–		7	–	2	–	0
Carthage		–		3	–	1	–	0
Iowa Agricultural		–		3	–	1	–	0
Notre Dame		–		4	–	1	–	1
Central Michigan		–		2	–	1	–	0
Baldwin–Wallace		–		2	–	1	–	1
Chicago Dental Infirmary		–		2	–	2	–	1
Lake Forest		–		4	–	5	–	1
Drake		–		2	–	3	–	0
Heidelberg		–		2	–	3	–	0
Detroit College		–		1	–	2	–	0
Indiana Normal		–		1	–	4	–	0
Kansas State		–		1	–	2	–	1
Mount Union		–		2	–	4	–	1
Rush Medical College		–		1	–	4	–	1
DePauw		–		2	–	6	–	0
Wittenberg		–		2	–	6	–	0
Haskell		–		1	–	4	–	0
Indiana State Normal		–		1	–	4	–	0
Ohio State		–		1	–	7	–	1
Lincoln (MO)		–		0	–	1	–	0
South Dakota Agricultural		–		0	–	1	–	0
Washington University		–		0	–	2	–	0
North Dakota Agricultural		–		0	–	3	–	0

The 1897 Notre Dame football team was an American football team that represented the University of Notre Dame in the 1897 college football season. In its second season with Frank E. Hering as coach, the team compiled a 4–1–1 record, shut out four opponents, and outscored all opponents by a combined total of 165 to 40.

== Schedule ==
Date	Opponent	Site	Result	Attendance	Source
October 13	Rush Medical	Brownson Hall field; Notre Dame, IN	T 0–0		
October 23	DePauw	Brownson Hall field; Notre Dame, IN	W 4–0		
October 28	Chicago Dental Infirmary	Brownson Hall field; Notre Dame, IN	W 62–0		
November 6	at Chicago	Marshall Field; Chicago, IL	L 5–34	800	
November 20	St. Viator	Brownson Hall field; Notre Dame, IN	W 60–0		
November 25	Michigan Agricultural	Brownson Hall field; Notre Dame, IN (rivalry)	W 34–6		
