= Ehrsam =

Ehrsam is a German surname. The name is derived from a Middle High German word meaning "having honor and esteem". Notable people with the surname include:

- A. W. Ehrsam (1876–1941), American football coach
- Fred Ehrsam (born 1988), American businessman
