= 1897 Fairmount Wheatshockers football team =

American college football season

1897 Fairmount Wheatshockers football
- Conference: Independent
- Record: 1–0
- Head coach: T. H. Morrison
- Captain: Dowd

1897 Midwestern college football independents records
	Conf.			Overall
Team	W	L	T	W		L		T
Butler		–		3	–	0	–	0
Fairmount		–		1	–	0	–	0
Washburn		–		7	–	1	–	0
Cincinnati		–		9	–	1	–	1
Iowa State Normal		–		5	–	1	–	0
Ohio Wesleyan		–		7	–	1	–	1
Indiana		–		6	–	1	–	1
Ohio		–		7	–	2	–	0
Carthage		–		3	–	1	–	0
Iowa Agricultural		–		3	–	1	–	0
Notre Dame		–		4	–	1	–	1
Central Michigan		–		2	–	1	–	0
Baldwin–Wallace		–		2	–	1	–	1
Chicago Dental Infirmary		–		2	–	2	–	1
Lake Forest		–		4	–	5	–	1
Drake		–		2	–	3	–	0
Heidelberg		–		2	–	3	–	0
Detroit College		–		1	–	2	–	0
Indiana Normal		–		1	–	4	–	0
Kansas State		–		1	–	2	–	1
Mount Union		–		2	–	4	–	1
Rush Medical College		–		1	–	4	–	1
DePauw		–		2	–	6	–	0
Wittenberg		–		2	–	6	–	0
Haskell		–		1	–	4	–	0
Indiana State Normal		–		1	–	4	–	0
Ohio State		–		1	–	7	–	1
Lincoln (MO)		–		0	–	1	–	0
South Dakota Agricultural		–		0	–	1	–	0
Washington University		–		0	–	2	–	0
North Dakota Agricultural		–		0	–	3	–	0

The 1897 Fairmount Wheatshockers football team was an American football team that represented Fairmount College (now known as Wichita State University) as an independent during the 1897 college football season. They played in one game, a 12 to 4 win over Wichita High School. Their coach was T. H. Morrison.

They played their one game at Wichita High School, now known as Wichita East, on Garfield Gridiron. It was played in front of "over 1,000". The first half was 35 minutes long and the second was 25 minutes. Their team captain was Dowd and their quarterback was Frank Hunter. The opening kickoff was sent to the Fairmount 35 and was returned 10 yards by Gohegan. The high school later forced a fumble which was followed by "a beautiful run" by Sheldon which gained 60 yards. The high school was unable to score on their drive as they were continually forced backwards and eventually committed a safety. That made the score 2 to 0 Fairmount. About 13 minutes later Fairmount scored their first touchdown, which with a missed conversion was worth 4 points. The teams would then exchange possessions until the half ended. The second half started at 4:01 p.m. and started with a Fairmount kickoff. On the drive Wichita was able to score their first and only touchdown. With a few minutes remaining, Fairmount scored another touchdown to end the game, 12 to 4.

== Schedule ==
Date	Time	Opponent	Site	Result	Attendance	Source
November 20	3:00 p.m.	at Wichita High School	Garfield Gridiron; Wichita, KS	W 12–4	over 1,000	

== Roster ==
Most available sources do not include players' full names and in some cases, they do not include their positions either. What verifiable information is available for Fairmount's roster is listed below.

1897 Fairmount Wheatshockers roster
Quarterbacks: Frank Hunter; Halfbacks: Izey RH; Sheldon LH	Fullbacks: Gohegan; Ends: Feas RE; Andrews LE; Tyrell Elberson ?; Robinson ?	Guards: Dowd RG (Captain); Orville Franz LG; Tackles: Kimball RT; Fleming LT; Centers: Kinzie	Head coach: T. H. Morrison; Rookies in italics
