= 1897 Ohio Wesleyan football team =

American college football season

1897 Ohio Wesleyan football
- Conference: Independent
- Record: 7–1–1
- Head coach: Fielding H. Yost (1st season)
- Captain: William Ehnes

1897 Midwestern college football independents records
| | Conf. | | | Overall |
| Team | W | L | T | W | | L | | T |
|---|---|---|---|---|---|---|---|---|
| Butler | | – | | 3 | – | 0 | – | 0 |
| Fairmount | | – | | 1 | – | 0 | – | 0 |
| Washburn | | – | | 7 | – | 1 | – | 0 |
| Cincinnati | | – | | 9 | – | 1 | – | 1 |
| Iowa State Normal | | – | | 5 | – | 1 | – | 0 |
| Ohio Wesleyan | | – | | 7 | – | 1 | – | 1 |
| Indiana | | – | | 6 | – | 1 | – | 1 |
| Ohio | | – | | 7 | – | 2 | – | 0 |
| Carthage | | – | | 3 | – | 1 | – | 0 |
| Iowa Agricultural | | – | | 3 | – | 1 | – | 0 |
| Notre Dame | | – | | 4 | – | 1 | – | 1 |
| Central Michigan | | – | | 2 | – | 1 | – | 0 |
| Baldwin–Wallace | | – | | 2 | – | 1 | – | 1 |
| Chicago Dental Infirmary | | – | | 2 | – | 2 | – | 1 |
| Lake Forest | | – | | 4 | – | 5 | – | 1 |
| Drake | | – | | 2 | – | 3 | – | 0 |
| Heidelberg | | – | | 2 | – | 3 | – | 0 |
| Detroit College | | – | | 1 | – | 2 | – | 0 |
| Indiana Normal | | – | | 1 | – | 4 | – | 0 |
| Kansas State | | – | | 1 | – | 2 | – | 1 |
| Mount Union | | – | | 2 | – | 4 | – | 1 |
| Rush Medical College | | – | | 1 | – | 4 | – | 1 |
| DePauw | | – | | 2 | – | 6 | – | 0 |
| Wittenberg | | – | | 2 | – | 6 | – | 0 |
| Haskell | | – | | 1 | – | 4 | – | 0 |
| Indiana State Normal | | – | | 1 | – | 4 | – | 0 |
| Ohio State | | – | | 1 | – | 7 | – | 1 |
| Lincoln (MO) | | – | | 0 | – | 1 | – | 0 |
| South Dakota Agricultural | | – | | 0 | – | 1 | – | 0 |
| Washington University | | – | | 0 | – | 2 | – | 0 |
| North Dakota Agricultural | | – | | 0 | – | 3 | – | 0 |

The 1897 Ohio Wesleyan football team represented Ohio Wesleyan University as an independent during the 1897 college football season. The team compiled a record of 7–1–1, played Michigan to a scoreless tie, defeated Ohio State by a 6–0 score, shut out six of nine opponents, and outscored all opponents by a combined score of 144 to 32. Fielding H. Yost was the team's football coach and also played for the team at the tackle position. The 1897 season was Yost's first as an intercollegiate football coach. Yost remained at Ohio Wesleyan only one year and later served as the football coach at Nebraska (1898), Kansas (1899), and Stanford (1900), before beginning a lengthy career as the head football coach at Michigan.

== Schedule ==
| Date | Opponent | Site | Result |
|---|---|---|---|
| September 25 | Ohio Medical | Delaware, OH | W 10–0 |
| October 2 | Columbus Barracks | Delaware, OH | W 33–0 |
| October 9 | at Michigan | Regents Field; Ann Arbor, MI | T 0–0 |
| October 16 | Oberlin | Oberlin, OH | L 5–14 |
| October 23 | Marietta | Delaware, OH | W 6–0 |
| October 30 | Western Reserve | Cleveland, OH | W 10–6 |
| November 6 | Wittenberg | Delaware, OH | W 46–0 |
| November 20 | Columbus Mutes | Delaware, OH | W 28–12 |
| November 25 | Ohio State | Recreation Park; Columbus, OH | W 6–0 |

== Game summaries ==
=== Michigan ===
On October 9, 1897, Ohio Wesleyan played Michigan to a scoreless tie in a game played in Ann Arbor, Michigan. The game was played in 15-minute halves. In addition to serving as coach, 26-year-old Fielding H. Yost was also the starting left tackle for Ohio Wesleyan. After the game, Michigan protested Ohio Wesleyan's decision to allow Yost, a paid coach and a non-student, to play in the game. Michigan asserted that Ohio Wesleyan had provided assurance that Yost would not play and introduced another individual as Yost. Michigan also charged that the Ohio Wesleyan team had engaged in "slugging and foul playing." One week after the game, Michigan announced that it would no longer schedule games against Ohio Wesleyan.

=== Oberlin ===
On October 16, 1897, Ohio Wesleyan sustained its only defeat of the season, losing to the team from Oberlin College in a game played in Oberlin, Ohio. Oberlin's coach was Samuel Huston Thompson.

=== Western Reserve ===
On October 30, 1897, Ohio Wesleyan defeated the team from Western Reserve University by a 10 to 6 score in a game played at Cleveland, Ohio. The key plays for Ohio Wesleyan were a blocked kick and two fumbles by Western Reserve.

=== Ohio State ===
On November 25, 1897, Ohio Wesleyan defeated the Ohio State football team by a 6-0 score in Columbus, Ohio. Breyfogle scored a touchdown for Ohio Wesleyan on a 70-yard run.
