= 1897 Chicago Dental Infirmary football team =

American college football season

1897 Chicago Dental Infirmary football
- Conference: Independent
- Record: 2–2–1
- Captains: S. Midgely (right halfback); Miller
- Home stadium: Chicago Dental grounds, Rockwood street and Ogden avenue

1897 Midwestern college football independents records
	Conf.			Overall
Team	W	L	T	W		L		T
Butler		–		3	–	0	–	0
Fairmount		–		1	–	0	–	0
Washburn		–		7	–	1	–	0
Cincinnati		–		9	–	1	–	1
Iowa State Normal		–		5	–	1	–	0
Ohio Wesleyan		–		7	–	1	–	1
Indiana		–		6	–	1	–	1
Ohio		–		7	–	2	–	0
Carthage		–		3	–	1	–	0
Iowa Agricultural		–		3	–	1	–	0
Notre Dame		–		4	–	1	–	1
Central Michigan		–		2	–	1	–	0
Baldwin–Wallace		–		2	–	1	–	1
Chicago Dental Infirmary		–		2	–	2	–	1
Lake Forest		–		4	–	5	–	1
Drake		–		2	–	3	–	0
Heidelberg		–		2	–	3	–	0
Detroit College		–		1	–	2	–	0
Indiana Normal		–		1	–	4	–	0
Kansas State		–		1	–	2	–	1
Mount Union		–		2	–	4	–	1
Rush Medical College		–		1	–	4	–	1
DePauw		–		2	–	6	–	0
Wittenberg		–		2	–	6	–	0
Haskell		–		1	–	4	–	0
Indiana State Normal		–		1	–	4	–	0
Ohio State		–		1	–	7	–	1
Lincoln (MO)		–		0	–	1	–	0
South Dakota Agricultural		–		0	–	1	–	0
Washington University		–		0	–	2	–	0
North Dakota Agricultural		–		0	–	3	–	0

The 1897 Chicago Dental Infirmary football team was an American football team that represented the Chicago Dental Infirmary in the 1897 college football season. The Dents, as they were occasionally known, compiled a 2–2–1, and were outscored by their opponents 97 to 48, with a majority of the lost points coming at the hands of Notre Dame, who shut them out 62–0. In a game for the unofficial title of "Western Dental college champion", Chicago Dental lost 0–14 to Northwestern University Dental department.

== Schedule ==
Date	Opponent	Site	Result	Source
October 16	Thistle Athletic club		unknown	
October 27	Bennett Medical college	Chicago Dental grounds; Chicago, IL	W 24–5	
October 28	Notre Dame	Brownson Hall field; Notre Dame, IN	L 0–62	
October 30	Lincoln Cycling club	Chicago Dental grounds; Chicago, IL	W 12–4	
November 13	Lewis Institute	Oak Park; Chicago, IL	T 12–12	
November	Northwestern Dental college	Bankers' Athletic field; Chicago, IL (Championship of Western Dental colleges)	L 0–14	
