= 1897 Rush Medical football team =

American college football season

1897 Rush Medical football
- Conference: Independent
- Record: 1–4–2
- Captain: Tresse (left end)

1897 Midwestern college football independents records
	Conf.			Overall
Team	W	L	T	W		L		T
Butler		–		3	–	0	–	0
Fairmount		–		1	–	0	–	0
Washburn		–		7	–	1	–	0
Cincinnati		–		9	–	1	–	1
Iowa State Normal		–		5	–	1	–	0
Ohio Wesleyan		–		7	–	1	–	1
Indiana		–		6	–	1	–	1
Ohio		–		7	–	2	–	0
Carthage		–		3	–	1	–	0
Iowa Agricultural		–		3	–	1	–	0
Notre Dame		–		4	–	1	–	1
Central Michigan		–		2	–	1	–	0
Baldwin–Wallace		–		2	–	1	–	1
Chicago Dental Infirmary		–		2	–	2	–	1
Lake Forest		–		4	–	5	–	1
Drake		–		2	–	3	–	0
Heidelberg		–		2	–	3	–	0
Detroit College		–		1	–	2	–	0
Indiana Normal		–		1	–	4	–	0
Kansas State		–		1	–	2	–	1
Mount Union		–		2	–	4	–	1
Rush Medical College		–		1	–	4	–	1
DePauw		–		2	–	6	–	0
Wittenberg		–		2	–	6	–	0
Haskell		–		1	–	4	–	0
Indiana State Normal		–		1	–	4	–	0
Ohio State		–		1	–	7	–	1
Lincoln (MO)		–		0	–	1	–	0
South Dakota Agricultural		–		0	–	1	–	0
Washington University		–		0	–	2	–	0
North Dakota Agricultural		–		0	–	3	–	0

The 1897 Rush Medical football team was an American football team that represented Rush Medical College in the 1897 college football season. The medics compiled a 1–4–2 record, and were outscored by their opponents 62 to 14.

== Schedule ==
Date	Time	Opponent	Site	Result	Attendance	Source
October 9		at Wisconsin	Camp Randall; Madison, WI	L 0–28		
October 13		at Notre Dame	Brownson Hall field; Notre Dame, IN	T 0–0		
October 16		at St. Charles Athletic Club	St. Charles, IL	W 4–0		
October 23		Bankers' Athletic Club		cancelled		
October 30		First Regiment	Marshall Field; Chicago, IL	L 10–12		
November 6		at Northwestern	Sheppard Field; Evanston, IL	L 0–14		
November 13	10:00 a.m.	Chicago Physicians and Surgeons	Gaelic Athletic grounds; Chicago, IL	L 0–8	1,500	
November 25		at St. Charles Athletic Club	Elgin, IL	T 0–0		
