= 1897 Iowa Agricultural Cyclones football team =

American college football season

1897 Iowa Agricultural Cyclones football
- Conference: Independent
- Record: 3–1
- Head coach: Pop Warner (3rd season)
- Captain: None

1897 Midwestern college football independents records
	Conf.			Overall
Team	W	L	T	W		L		T
Butler		–		3	–	0	–	0
Fairmount		–		1	–	0	–	0
Washburn		–		7	–	1	–	0
Cincinnati		–		9	–	1	–	1
Iowa State Normal		–		5	–	1	–	0
Ohio Wesleyan		–		7	–	1	–	1
Indiana		–		6	–	1	–	1
Ohio		–		7	–	2	–	0
Carthage		–		3	–	1	–	0
Iowa Agricultural		–		3	–	1	–	0
Notre Dame		–		4	–	1	–	1
Central Michigan		–		2	–	1	–	0
Baldwin–Wallace		–		2	–	1	–	1
Chicago Dental Infirmary		–		2	–	2	–	1
Lake Forest		–		4	–	5	–	1
Drake		–		2	–	3	–	0
Heidelberg		–		2	–	3	–	0
Detroit College		–		1	–	2	–	0
Indiana Normal		–		1	–	4	–	0
Kansas State		–		1	–	2	–	1
Mount Union		–		2	–	4	–	1
Rush Medical College		–		1	–	4	–	1
DePauw		–		2	–	6	–	0
Wittenberg		–		2	–	6	–	0
Haskell		–		1	–	4	–	0
Indiana State Normal		–		1	–	4	–	0
Ohio State		–		1	–	7	–	1
Lincoln (MO)		–		0	–	1	–	0
South Dakota Agricultural		–		0	–	1	–	0
Washington University		–		0	–	2	–	0
North Dakota Agricultural		–		0	–	3	–	0

The 1897 Iowa Agricultural Cyclones football team represented Iowa Agricultural College (later renamed Iowa State University) as an independent during the 1897 college football season. Under head coach Pop Warner, the Cyclones compiled a 3–1 record and outscored their opponents by a combined total of 40 to 22. There was no team captain for the 1897 season.

Between 1892 and 1913, the football team played on a field that later became the site of the university's Parks Library.

== Schedule ==
Date	Opponent	Site	Result
October 8	Nebraska	State Field; Ames, IA (rivalry)	W 10–0
October 23	at Minnesota	Minneapolis, MN	W 12–10
October 30	at Grinnell	Grinnell, IA	L 6–12
November 5	at Iowa	Iowa Field; Iowa City, IA (rivalry)	W 12–0
