= 1897 Haskell Indians football team =

American college football season

1897 Haskell Indians football
- Conference: Independent
- Record: 1–4
- Head coach: Unknown

1897 Midwestern college football independents records
	Conf.			Overall
Team	W	L	T	W		L		T
Butler		–		3	–	0	–	0
Fairmount		–		1	–	0	–	0
Washburn		–		7	–	1	–	0
Cincinnati		–		9	–	1	–	1
Iowa State Normal		–		5	–	1	–	0
Ohio Wesleyan		–		7	–	1	–	1
Indiana		–		6	–	1	–	1
Ohio		–		7	–	2	–	0
Carthage		–		3	–	1	–	0
Iowa Agricultural		–		3	–	1	–	0
Notre Dame		–		4	–	1	–	1
Central Michigan		–		2	–	1	–	0
Baldwin–Wallace		–		2	–	1	–	1
Chicago Dental Infirmary		–		2	–	2	–	1
Lake Forest		–		4	–	5	–	1
Drake		–		2	–	3	–	0
Heidelberg		–		2	–	3	–	0
Detroit College		–		1	–	2	–	0
Indiana Normal		–		1	–	4	–	0
Kansas State		–		1	–	2	–	1
Mount Union		–		2	–	4	–	1
Rush Medical College		–		1	–	4	–	1
DePauw		–		2	–	6	–	0
Wittenberg		–		2	–	6	–	0
Haskell		–		1	–	4	–	0
Indiana State Normal		–		1	–	4	–	0
Ohio State		–		1	–	7	–	1
Lincoln (MO)		–		0	–	1	–	0
South Dakota Agricultural		–		0	–	1	–	0
Washington University		–		0	–	2	–	0
North Dakota Agricultural		–		0	–	3	–	0

The 1897 Haskell Indians football team was an American football team that represented the Haskell Indian Institute (now known as Haskell Indian Nations University) as an independent during the 1897 college football season. The team compiled a 1–4 record and failed to register any points in its four losses. The team's sole victory was over Midland College of Atchison, Kansas. The 1895 season was the school's third competing in football. No record has been found identifying a coach for the team, though Kansas coach Wylie G. Woodruff led some practices and Frank Sweet was identified as the manager. The team played no home games.

== Schedule ==
Date	Opponent	Site	Result	Source
September 29	at Washburn	Athletic Park; Topeka, KS	L 0–6	
October 2	at Kansas	McCook Field; Lawrence, KS	L 0–40	
October 23	at Midland	Atchison, KS	W 22–0	
October 27	at Kansas City Medics	Exposition Park; Kansas City, MO	L 0–42	
November 25	at Washburn	Athletic Park; Topeka, KS	L 0–8	
