= T. H. Morrison =

American football coach

Biographical details
- Born: October 13, 1869; Olivet, Michigan, U.S.
- Died: February 18, 1912 (aged 42); Wichita, Kansas, U.S.

Playing career
- c. 1894: Northwestern

Coaching career (HC unless noted)
- 1897: Fairmount

Head coaching record
- Overall: 1–0

Theodore Harland Morrison (October 15, 1869 – February 18, 1912) was an American librarian and college football player and coach. He was the first head football coach at Fairmount College—now known as Wichita State University—in Wichita, Kansas, serving for one season, in 1897, and compiling a record of 1–0.

Morrison was born on October 15, 1869, in Olivet, Michigan. In 1892, he graduated from Marietta College in Marietta, Ohio. Morrison then did graduate study at Northwestern University, where he played football before earning a Bachelor of Laws degree in 1895. Morrison served as the assistant librarian at Fairmount College from its founding in 1895 until 1903 and librarian from then until his death. He died on February 18, 1912, at his home in Wichita. His death was thought to have been caused by a brain abscess, stemming from a bout of scarlet fever he had suffered a child, which rendered him partially deaf. Morrison was the son of Nathan Morrison, the first president of Fairmount College.

== Head coaching record ==
Year	Team	Overall	Conference	Standing	Bowl/playoffs
Fairmount Wheatshockers (Independent) (1897)
1897	Fairmount	1–0			
Fairmount:		1–0			
Total:		1–0			
