= 1897 Ohio Green and White football team =

American college football season

1897 Ohio Green and White football
- Conference: Independent
- Record: 7–2
- Head coach: Warwick Ford (1st season)

1897 Midwestern college football independents records
	Conf.			Overall
Team	W	L	T	W		L		T
Butler		–		3	–	0	–	0
Fairmount		–		1	–	0	–	0
Washburn		–		7	–	1	–	0
Cincinnati		–		9	–	1	–	1
Iowa State Normal		–		5	–	1	–	0
Ohio Wesleyan		–		7	–	1	–	1
Indiana		–		6	–	1	–	1
Ohio		–		7	–	2	–	0
Carthage		–		3	–	1	–	0
Iowa Agricultural		–		3	–	1	–	0
Notre Dame		–		4	–	1	–	1
Central Michigan		–		2	–	1	–	0
Baldwin–Wallace		–		2	–	1	–	1
Chicago Dental Infirmary		–		2	–	2	–	1
Lake Forest		–		4	–	5	–	1
Drake		–		2	–	3	–	0
Heidelberg		–		2	–	3	–	0
Detroit College		–		1	–	2	–	0
Indiana Normal		–		1	–	4	–	0
Kansas State		–		1	–	2	–	1
Mount Union		–		2	–	4	–	1
Rush Medical College		–		1	–	4	–	1
DePauw		–		2	–	6	–	0
Wittenberg		–		2	–	6	–	0
Haskell		–		1	–	4	–	0
Indiana State Normal		–		1	–	4	–	0
Ohio State		–		1	–	7	–	1
Lincoln (MO)		–		0	–	1	–	0
South Dakota Agricultural		–		0	–	1	–	0
Washington University		–		0	–	2	–	0
North Dakota Agricultural		–		0	–	3	–	0

The 1897 Ohio Green and White football team was an American football team that represented Ohio University as an independent during the 1897 college football season. In its fourth season of intercollegiate football, Ohio compiled a 7–2 record and outscored opponents by a total of 150 to 26. Warwick Ford was the team's head coach; it was Ford's first and only season in the position. The team lost its first two games, but concluded the season by winning its seven remaining games, including shutouts against Muskingum (32-0), Denison (28-0), Otterbein (24-0), and West Virginia (12-0).

== Schedule ==
Date	Time	Opponent	Site	Result	Source
September 25	3:00 p.m.	vs. Cincinnati	East End park; Chillicothe, OH	L 0–12	
October 9		Marietta	Athens, OH	L 0–4	
October 16		Muskingum		W 32–0	
		Denison	Athens, OH	W 28–0	
		Ohio Medical		W 12–0	
		Otterbein		W 24–0	
		Marietta		W 6–4	
November 5		West Virginia	Athens, OH	W 12–0	
		D&D Institute		W 36–6	
