= 1897 Drake Bulldogs football team =

American college football season

1897 Drake Bulldogs football
- Conference: Independent
- Record: 2–3
- Head coach: A. B. Potter (1st season)

1897 Midwestern college football independents records
| | Conf. | | | Overall |
| Team | W | L | T | W | | L | | T |
|---|---|---|---|---|---|---|---|---|
| Butler | | – | | 3 | – | 0 | – | 0 |
| Fairmount | | – | | 1 | – | 0 | – | 0 |
| Washburn | | – | | 7 | – | 1 | – | 0 |
| Cincinnati | | – | | 9 | – | 1 | – | 1 |
| Iowa State Normal | | – | | 5 | – | 1 | – | 0 |
| Ohio Wesleyan | | – | | 7 | – | 1 | – | 1 |
| Indiana | | – | | 6 | – | 1 | – | 1 |
| Ohio | | – | | 7 | – | 2 | – | 0 |
| Carthage | | – | | 3 | – | 1 | – | 0 |
| Iowa Agricultural | | – | | 3 | – | 1 | – | 0 |
| Notre Dame | | – | | 4 | – | 1 | – | 1 |
| Central Michigan | | – | | 2 | – | 1 | – | 0 |
| Baldwin–Wallace | | – | | 2 | – | 1 | – | 1 |
| Chicago Dental Infirmary | | – | | 2 | – | 2 | – | 1 |
| Lake Forest | | – | | 4 | – | 5 | – | 1 |
| Drake | | – | | 2 | – | 3 | – | 0 |
| Heidelberg | | – | | 2 | – | 3 | – | 0 |
| Detroit College | | – | | 1 | – | 2 | – | 0 |
| Indiana Normal | | – | | 1 | – | 4 | – | 0 |
| Kansas State | | – | | 1 | – | 2 | – | 1 |
| Mount Union | | – | | 2 | – | 4 | – | 1 |
| Rush Medical College | | – | | 1 | – | 4 | – | 1 |
| DePauw | | – | | 2 | – | 6 | – | 0 |
| Wittenberg | | – | | 2 | – | 6 | – | 0 |
| Haskell | | – | | 1 | – | 4 | – | 0 |
| Indiana State Normal | | – | | 1 | – | 4 | – | 0 |
| Ohio State | | – | | 1 | – | 7 | – | 1 |
| Lincoln (MO) | | – | | 0 | – | 1 | – | 0 |
| South Dakota Agricultural | | – | | 0 | – | 1 | – | 0 |
| Washington University | | – | | 0 | – | 2 | – | 0 |
| North Dakota Agricultural | | – | | 0 | – | 3 | – | 0 |

The 1897 Drake Bulldogs football team was an American football team that represented Drake University as an independent during the 1897 college football season. In its first season under head coach A. B. Potter, the team compiled a 2–3 record and outscored opponents by a total of 66 to 34.

== Schedule ==
| Date | Opponent | Site | Result |
|---|---|---|---|
| October 2 | Penn (IA) | Des Moines, IA | W 16–4 |
| October 16 | at Panora Athletic Club | Panora, IA | L 0–16 |
| October 30 | at Knoxville | | W 18–0 |
| November 13 | Iowa | Des Moines, IA | L 0–16 |
| November 20 | Grinnell | Des Moines, IA | L 0–30 |
