= 1897 DePauw football team =

American college football season

1897 DePauw football
- Conference: Independent
- Record: 2–6
- Head coach: Arthur Hamrick (2nd season)
- Captain: Roller (left guard)

1897 Midwestern college football independents records
	Conf.			Overall
Team	W	L	T	W		L		T
Butler		–		3	–	0	–	0
Fairmount		–		1	–	0	–	0
Washburn		–		7	–	1	–	0
Cincinnati		–		9	–	1	–	1
Iowa State Normal		–		5	–	1	–	0
Ohio Wesleyan		–		7	–	1	–	1
Indiana		–		6	–	1	–	1
Ohio		–		7	–	2	–	0
Carthage		–		3	–	1	–	0
Iowa Agricultural		–		3	–	1	–	0
Notre Dame		–		4	–	1	–	1
Central Michigan		–		2	–	1	–	0
Baldwin–Wallace		–		2	–	1	–	1
Chicago Dental Infirmary		–		2	–	2	–	1
Lake Forest		–		4	–	5	–	1
Drake		–		2	–	3	–	0
Heidelberg		–		2	–	3	–	0
Detroit College		–		1	–	2	–	0
Indiana Normal		–		1	–	4	–	0
Kansas State		–		1	–	2	–	1
Mount Union		–		2	–	4	–	1
Rush Medical College		–		1	–	4	–	1
DePauw		–		2	–	6	–	0
Wittenberg		–		2	–	6	–	0
Haskell		–		1	–	4	–	0
Indiana State Normal		–		1	–	4	–	0
Ohio State		–		1	–	7	–	1
Lincoln (MO)		–		0	–	1	–	0
South Dakota Agricultural		–		0	–	1	–	0
Washington University		–		0	–	2	–	0
North Dakota Agricultural		–		0	–	3	–	0

The 1897 DePauw football team was an American football team that represented DePauw University as an independent during the 1897 college football season. In its second season with Arthur Hamrick as coach, the team compiled a 2–6 record, and were outscored by their opponents 70 to 23. DePauw was shut out six times and did not score a single point against a collegiate football team in six contests. In a games against Plainfield Central Academy, a disagreement over a touchdown in the first half led to a forfeit win for DePauw.

== Schedule ==
Date	Opponent	Site	Result	Attendance	Source
October 9	Indianapolis Training School	Greencastle, IN	W 22–0		
October 16	Purdue	Greencastle, IN	L 0–8		
October 23	at Notre Dame	Notre Dame, IN	L 0–4		
October 30	Rose Polytechnic	Greencastle, IN	L 0–16		
November 8	at Indiana	Bloomington, IN	L 0–18		
November 20	Plainfield Central Academy	Greencastle, IN	W 1–0 (forfeit, score was 12–0)		
November	Rose Polytechnic		L 0–8		
November 25	Indiana	Bloomington, IN	L 0–14	500	
