= 1897 Cincinnati football team =

American college football season

1897 Cincinnati football
- Conference: Independent
- Record: 9–1–1
- Head coach: Tom Fennell (1st season)
- Captain: William Bass
- Home stadium: League Park

1897 Midwestern college football independents records
| | Conf. | | | Overall |
| Team | W | L | T | W | | L | | T |
|---|---|---|---|---|---|---|---|---|
| Butler | | – | | 3 | – | 0 | – | 0 |
| Fairmount | | – | | 1 | – | 0 | – | 0 |
| Washburn | | – | | 7 | – | 1 | – | 0 |
| Cincinnati | | – | | 9 | – | 1 | – | 1 |
| Iowa State Normal | | – | | 5 | – | 1 | – | 0 |
| Ohio Wesleyan | | – | | 7 | – | 1 | – | 1 |
| Indiana | | – | | 6 | – | 1 | – | 1 |
| Ohio | | – | | 7 | – | 2 | – | 0 |
| Carthage | | – | | 3 | – | 1 | – | 0 |
| Iowa Agricultural | | – | | 3 | – | 1 | – | 0 |
| Notre Dame | | – | | 4 | – | 1 | – | 1 |
| Central Michigan | | – | | 2 | – | 1 | – | 0 |
| Baldwin–Wallace | | – | | 2 | – | 1 | – | 1 |
| Chicago Dental Infirmary | | – | | 2 | – | 2 | – | 1 |
| Lake Forest | | – | | 4 | – | 5 | – | 1 |
| Drake | | – | | 2 | – | 3 | – | 0 |
| Heidelberg | | – | | 2 | – | 3 | – | 0 |
| Detroit College | | – | | 1 | – | 2 | – | 0 |
| Indiana Normal | | – | | 1 | – | 4 | – | 0 |
| Kansas State | | – | | 1 | – | 2 | – | 1 |
| Mount Union | | – | | 2 | – | 4 | – | 1 |
| Rush Medical College | | – | | 1 | – | 4 | – | 1 |
| DePauw | | – | | 2 | – | 6 | – | 0 |
| Wittenberg | | – | | 2 | – | 6 | – | 0 |
| Haskell | | – | | 1 | – | 4 | – | 0 |
| Indiana State Normal | | – | | 1 | – | 4 | – | 0 |
| Ohio State | | – | | 1 | – | 7 | – | 1 |
| Lincoln (MO) | | – | | 0 | – | 1 | – | 0 |
| South Dakota Agricultural | | – | | 0 | – | 1 | – | 0 |
| Washington University | | – | | 0 | – | 2 | – | 0 |
| North Dakota Agricultural | | – | | 0 | – | 3 | – | 0 |

The 1897 Cincinnati football team was an American football team that represented the University of Cincinnati as an independent during the 1897 college football season. Led by Tom Fennell in his first and only season as head coach, Cincinnati compiled a record of 9–1–1. William Bass was the team captain. The team played home games at League Park in Cincinnati.

Following their regular season schedule, which they completed with a record of 7–1–1, losing only to the Carlisle Indians, Cincinnati played two postseason games in New Orleans. The team was invited to New Orleans by the Southern Athletic Club to play a football game on New Year's Day. Cincinnati easily defeated the Athletic Club team, and at the victory party following the win, students from nearby Louisiana State University (LSU) invited the Cincinnati players to come to their school to play another game. The Cincinnati–LSU game, which took place a few days later and pre-dated the first Rose Bowl Game by five years, resulted in a 28–0 (exact score varies by source) Cincinnati win. This game could be considered, the school's athletic department contemplates, as the first bowl game in Cincinnati football history.

== Schedule ==
| Date | Time | Opponent | Site | Result | Attendance | Source |
|---|---|---|---|---|---|---|
| September 25 | 3:00 p.m. | vs. Ohio | East End park; Chillicothe, OH | W 12–0 | | |
| October 2 | 4:00 p.m. | at Centennial Guards | Military Plaza, Centennial grounds; Nashville, TN | T 6–6 | 2,500 | |
| October 9 | 2:30 p.m. | at Miami (OH) | Miami athletic grounds; Oxford, OH (Victory Bell) | W 6–0 | | |
| October 16 | 3:00 p.m. | at Centre | Danville, KY | W 4–0 | 300 | |
| October 23 | | Ohio National Guard / 17th Infantry | League Park; Cincinnati, OH | W 20–0 | | |
| October 30 | | Miami (OH) | League Park; Cincinnati, OH | W 10–6 | | |
| November 6 | | Centre | League Park; Cincinnati, OH | W 10–0 | | |
| November 13 | 3:00 p.m. | Ohio State | League Park; Cincinnati, OH | W 34–0 | | |
| November 25 | 2:30 p.m. | Carlisle | League Park; Cincinnati, OH | L 0–10 | 4,500 | |
| January 1, 1898 | 1:00 p.m. | at Southern Athletic Club | Athletic park gridiron; New Orleans, LA | W 16–0 | | |
| January 3, 1898 | 3:34 p.m. | at LSU | State Field; Baton Rouge, LA | W 28–0 | | |
