= 1897 Indiana Hoosiers football team =

American college football season

1897 Indiana Hoosiers football
- Conference: Independent
- Record: 6–1–1
- Head coach: Madison G. Gonterman (2nd season)
- Captain: Emmett O. King
- Home stadium: Athletic Field

1897 Midwestern college football independents records
	Conf.			Overall
Team	W	L	T	W		L		T
Butler		–		3	–	0	–	0
Fairmount		–		1	–	0	–	0
Washburn		–		7	–	1	–	0
Cincinnati		–		9	–	1	–	1
Iowa State Normal		–		5	–	1	–	0
Ohio Wesleyan		–		7	–	1	–	1
Indiana		–		6	–	1	–	1
Ohio		–		7	–	2	–	0
Carthage		–		3	–	1	–	0
Iowa Agricultural		–		3	–	1	–	0
Notre Dame		–		4	–	1	–	1
Central Michigan		–		2	–	1	–	0
Baldwin–Wallace		–		2	–	1	–	1
Chicago Dental Infirmary		–		2	–	2	–	1
Lake Forest		–		4	–	5	–	1
Drake		–		2	–	3	–	0
Heidelberg		–		2	–	3	–	0
Detroit College		–		1	–	2	–	0
Indiana Normal		–		1	–	4	–	0
Kansas State		–		1	–	2	–	1
Mount Union		–		2	–	4	–	1
Rush Medical College		–		1	–	4	–	1
DePauw		–		2	–	6	–	0
Wittenberg		–		2	–	6	–	0
Haskell		–		1	–	4	–	0
Indiana State Normal		–		1	–	4	–	0
Ohio State		–		1	–	7	–	1
Lincoln (MO)		–		0	–	1	–	0
South Dakota Agricultural		–		0	–	1	–	0
Washington University		–		0	–	2	–	0
North Dakota Agricultural		–		0	–	3	–	0

The 1897 Indiana Hoosiers football team was an American football team that represented Indiana University during the 1897 college football season. In their second season under head coach Madison G. Gonterman, the Hoosiers compiled a 6–1–1 record and outscored their opponents 150 to 32.

== Schedule ==
Date	Opponent	Site	Result	Attendance	Source
October 2	Rose Polytechnic	Athletic Field; Bloomington, IN	T 6–6		
October 16	at Rose Polytechnic	Terre Haute, IN	W 12–0		
October 16	Bedford Community College (IN)	Athletic Field; Bloomington, IN	W 40–0		
October 23	Emmerich Manual High School	Athletic Field; Bloomington, IN	W 30–0		
October 30	at Purdue	Stuart Field; West Lafayette, IN (rivalry)	L 6–20		
November 8	DePauw	Athletic Field; Bloomington, IN	W 18–0		
November 13	Miami (OH)	Athletic Field; Bloomington, IN	W 22–6		
November 25	DePauw	McKeen Field; Greencastle, IN	W 14–0	1,000	

== Personnel ==
=== Roster ===
Name	Position	Year
Stinchfield		
Jones		
Frank Wayne Ray		
Edgar Allen Binford		
John Clark Hubbard		
Young		
Emmett O. King (C)		
Pike		
William David Youtsler		
Roy Dee Keehn		
Gillespie		
C. Ray		
Lee F. Hunt		
Leopold		
Hinchman		
Daniel Walter Sheek		
Thistlewaite		
Hamilton		
Huddle		

=== Staffing ===
Madison G. Gonterman, Coach
