= A. B. Potter =

American football player and coach (1872–1961)

Biographical details
- Born: January 8, 1872; Pella, Iowa, U.S.
- Died: January 26, 1961 (aged 89); Oklahoma City, Oklahoma, U.S.

Playing career
- 1895–1896: Northwestern

Coaching career (HC unless noted)
- 1897–1899: Drake

Head coaching record
- Overall: 11–7

Albert Byron Potter Sr. (January 8, 1872 – January 26, 1961) was American football coach. He was the fourth head football coach at Drake University Des Moines, Iowa, serving for three seasons, from 1897 to 1899, and compiling a record of 11–7.

Potter attended Northwestern University, where he was a dental student. He later worked as a dentist based in Oklahoma City, Oklahoma, where he died in 1961.

== Head coaching record ==
Year	Team	Overall	Conference	Standing	Bowl/playoffs
Drake Bulldogs (Independent) (1897–1899)
1897	Drake	2–3			
1898	Drake	4–2			
1899	Drake	5–2			
Drake:		11–7			
Total:		11–7			
