= 1897 Kansas State Aggies football team =

American college football season

1897 Kansas State Aggies football
- Conference: Independent
- Record: 1–2–1
- Head coach: A. W. Ehrsam (1st season)

1897 Midwestern college football independents records
	Conf.			Overall
Team	W	L	T	W		L		T
Butler		–		3	–	0	–	0
Fairmount		–		1	–	0	–	0
Washburn		–		7	–	1	–	0
Cincinnati		–		9	–	1	–	1
Iowa State Normal		–		5	–	1	–	0
Ohio Wesleyan		–		7	–	1	–	1
Indiana		–		6	–	1	–	1
Ohio		–		7	–	2	–	0
Carthage		–		3	–	1	–	0
Iowa Agricultural		–		3	–	1	–	0
Notre Dame		–		4	–	1	–	1
Central Michigan		–		2	–	1	–	0
Baldwin–Wallace		–		2	–	1	–	1
Chicago Dental Infirmary		–		2	–	2	–	1
Lake Forest		–		4	–	5	–	1
Drake		–		2	–	3	–	0
Heidelberg		–		2	–	3	–	0
Detroit College		–		1	–	2	–	0
Indiana Normal		–		1	–	4	–	0
Kansas State		–		1	–	2	–	1
Mount Union		–		2	–	4	–	1
Rush Medical College		–		1	–	4	–	1
DePauw		–		2	–	6	–	0
Wittenberg		–		2	–	6	–	0
Haskell		–		1	–	4	–	0
Indiana State Normal		–		1	–	4	–	0
Ohio State		–		1	–	7	–	1
Lincoln (MO)		–		0	–	1	–	0
South Dakota Agricultural		–		0	–	1	–	0
Washington University		–		0	–	2	–	0
North Dakota Agricultural		–		0	–	3	–	0

The 1897 Kansas State Aggies football team represented Kansas State Agricultural College—now known as Kansas State University—as an independent during the 1897 college football season. Led by A. W. Ehrsam in his first and only season as head coach, the Aggies compiled a record of 1–2–1.

== Schedule ==
Date	Opponent	Site	Result
November 1	Chapman High School	Manhattan, KS	W 4–0
November 8	Washburn	Manhattan, KS	L 0–4
November 13	Chapman High School	Chapman, KS	T 0–0
November 13	Washburn	Topeka, KS	L 0–36
