= 1897 Ohio State Buckeyes football team =

American college football season

1897 Ohio State Buckeyes football
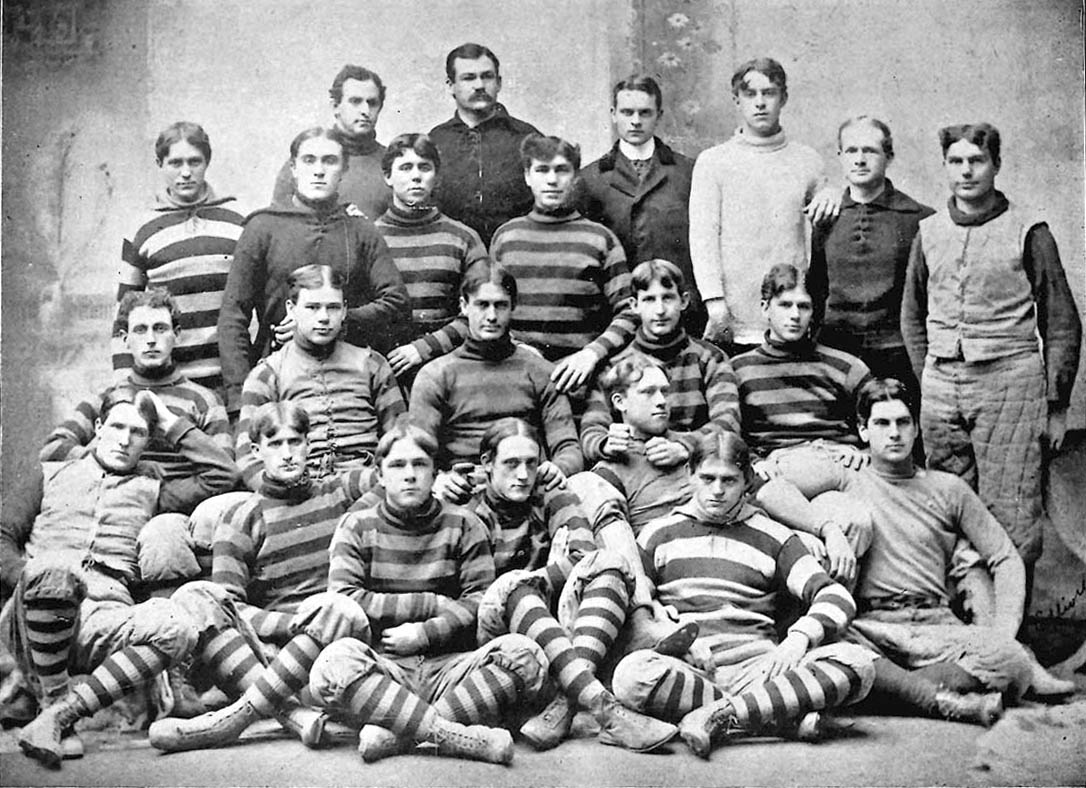
- Conference: Independent
- Record: 1–7–1
- Head coach: David Farragut Edwards (1st season)
- Home stadium: Recreation Park

1897 Midwestern college football independents records
	Conf.			Overall
Team	W	L	T	W		L		T
Butler		–		3	–	0	–	0
Fairmount		–		1	–	0	–	0
Washburn		–		7	–	1	–	0
Cincinnati		–		9	–	1	–	1
Iowa State Normal		–		5	–	1	–	0
Ohio Wesleyan		–		7	–	1	–	1
Indiana		–		6	–	1	–	1
Ohio		–		7	–	2	–	0
Carthage		–		3	–	1	–	0
Iowa Agricultural		–		3	–	1	–	0
Notre Dame		–		4	–	1	–	1
Central Michigan		–		2	–	1	–	0
Baldwin–Wallace		–		2	–	1	–	1
Chicago Dental Infirmary		–		2	–	2	–	1
Missouri		–		5	–	6	–	0
Lake Forest		–		4	–	5	–	1
Drake		–		2	–	3	–	0
Heidelberg		–		2	–	3	–	0
Detroit College		–		1	–	2	–	0
Indiana Normal		–		1	–	4	–	0
Kansas State		–		1	–	2	–	1
Mount Union		–		2	–	4	–	1
Rush Medical College		–		1	–	4	–	1
DePauw		–		2	–	6	–	0
Wittenberg		–		2	–	6	–	0
Haskell		–		1	–	4	–	0
Indiana State Normal		–		1	–	4	–	0
Ohio State		–		1	–	7	–	1
Lincoln (MO)		–		0	–	1	–	0
South Dakota Agricultural		–		0	–	1	–	0
Washington University		–		0	–	2	–	0
North Dakota Agricultural		–		0	–	3	–	0

The 1897 Ohio State Buckeyes football team represented Ohio State University in the 1897 college football season.

== Schedule ==
Date	Time	Opponent	Site	Result	Source
October 6		Ohio Medical	Recreation Park; Columbus, OH	W 6–0	
October 9		Case	Recreation Park; Columbus, OH	L 0–14	
October 16		at Michigan	Regents Field; Ann Arbor, MI (rivalry)	L 0–34	
October 23		Otterbein	Recreation Park; Columbus, OH	T 12–12	
October 26		Columbus Barracks	Recreation Park; Columbus, OH	L 0–6	
October 30		Oberlin	Recreation Park; Columbus, OH	L 0–44	
November 6		vs. West Virginia	Parkersburg, WV	L 0–28	
November 13	3:00 p.m.	at Cincinnati	League Park; Cincinnati, OH	L 0–34	
November 25		Ohio Wesleyan	Recreation Park; Columbus, OH	L 0–6	
