= Wichita State Shockers football =

Former college football team in Kansas, USA

- First season: 1897
- Last season: 1986
- Stadium: Cessna Stadium (capacity: 31,500)
- Location: Wichita, Kansas
- Conference: Independent (1895–1923, 1927, 1940–1945, 1986); KCAC (1924–1926); CIAC (1928–1939); MVC (1945–1985)
- All-time record: 375–402–47 (.484)
- Bowl record: 0–3 (.000)

Conference championships
- KCAC: 1908, 1911 CIAC: 1931, 1932, 1933, 1935, 1937, 1938, 1939 MVC: 1954, 1955, 1960, 1961, 1963
- Colors: Black and yellow

The Wichita State Shockers football team was the college football program of Wichita State University in Wichita, Kansas. The Shockers fielded a team from 1897 to 1986. They played their home games at Cessna Stadium and were members of the Missouri Valley Conference until the program was discontinued. The team was known as Fairmount Wheatshockers from its first season in 1897 to 1925, and the Wichita Shockers from 1926 through 1963.

== History ==
=== First game ===
The first official football game played by Wichita State was in 1897, when they were known as Fairmount, under the coaching of T. H. Morrison. Fairmount defeated Wichita High School, now known as Wichita East, by a score of 12–4 in the only game played that year.

=== 1905 night game ===
In the 1905 season, the Coleman Company set up temporary gas-powered lighting for a night game against Cooper College (now called the Sterling Warriors). It was the first night football game played west of the Mississippi River. Fairmount won the game 24–0.

=== 1905 "experimental" game ===
On December 25, 1905, Fairmount played a game against the Washburn Ichabods using a set of experimental rules. The game was officiated by then Washburn head coach John H. Outland.

The experiment was considered a failure. Outland commented, "It seems to me that the distance required in three downs would almost eliminate touchdowns, except through fakes or flukes." The Los Angeles Times reported that there was much kicking and that the game was considered much safer than regular play, but that the new rule was not "conducive to the sport."

In his history of the sport of football, David M. Nelson concluded that "the first forward passes were thrown at the end of the 1905 season in a game between Fairmount and Washburn colleges in Kansas." According to Nelson, Washburn completed three passes, and Fairmount completed two.

=== Plane crash ===
On October 2, 1970, a plane crashed that was carrying about half of the football team on their way to play a game against Utah State University. 31 people were killed. The game was canceled, and the Utah State football team held a memorial service at the stadium where the game was to have been played.

=== Breaking the color barrier in college football coaching ===
When Willie Jeffries became Wichita State's head coach in 1979, he became the first African-American head coach of a Division I-A football program. Former T. C. Williams High School football coach Herman Boone, who was portrayed by Denzel Washington in the film Remember the Titans, compared Jeffries's hiring to that of Jackie Robinson signing with the Brooklyn Dodgers.

=== Program discontinued ===
On December 2, 1986, Wichita State President Warren Armstrong announced that the university would no longer sponsor football due to the financial strain the program placed on the university. On May 16, 2009, the Wichita State University alumni association held an all football players reunion at Cessna Stadium.

=== Potential program revivals ===
In 1992, a study was done on Cessna Stadium to comply with I-A football standards. It was shown that $24 million in improvements were needed.

In 1997, the cost was cited at $11 million to restart the football program and three other women's sports.

In 1998, an advisory committee at Wichita State recommended reinstating the football program at Wichita State after a 15-month study for $70,000.

In 2006, Wichita Mayor Carlos Mayans proposed to use public funds to restart the football program at Wichita State. He would subsequently drop the plan weeks later.

In 2012, an attempt was made to begin a club-level football team at Wichita State with hopes of eventually reviving the football program, though no official endorsement was given by the university.

Wichita State's 2017 move to the American Athletic Conference leaves it as the only full member of the conference which does not play football. However, the American has 14 football-playing schools, with Army and Navy as associate members for football only.

== Conference championships ==
Wichita State won fourteen conference titles.

Conference	Years
Kansas Collegiate Athletic Conference	1908, 1911
Central Intercollegiate Athletic Conference	1931, 1932, 1933, 1935, 1937, 1938, 1939
Missouri Valley Conference	1954, 1955, 1960, 1961, 1963
Total	14 Conference Championships

== Record versus Missouri Valley Conference ==
The records below only includes games while a member of the conference and does not include games against teams listed below considered non-conference games.

Opponent	Home	Away	Overall
Tulsa	7–10–1	4–18	11–28–1
Drake	10–4	3–2	12–6
North Texas State	4–3–1	1–8	5–11–1
West Texas State	4–4	3–3	7–7
Cincinnati	2–3–1	1–5–1	3–8–2
New Mexico State	1–3–1	2–5	3–8–1
Louisville	1–4	1–5	2–9
Oklahoma State	2–3	1–3	3–6
Detroit	2–3	1–2	3–5
Houston	2–3	1–1	3–4
Southern Illinois	4–0	0–1	5–1
Indiana State	1–1	0–2–1	1–3–1
Illinois State	2–0	1–1	3–1
Saint Louis	1–0	2–0–1	3–0–1
Memphis State	0–0	0–3	0–3
Bradley	3–0	0–0	3–0
Total	45–42–4	21–59–3	66–101–7

== Record against Kansas schools ==
Opponent	Home	Away	Overall
Kansas	1–1	1–4	2–6
Kansas State	1–5–1	3–12–1	4–17–2
Total	2–6–1	4–16–1	6–22–2

== Bowl games ==
The Shockers played in three bowl games and had an 0–3 record.

Season	Coach	Bowl	Opponent	Result
1947	Ralph Graham	Raisin Bowl	Pacific	L 14–26
1948	Jim Trimble	Camellia Bowl	Hardin–Simmons	L 12–49
1961	Hank Foldberg	Sun Bowl	Villanova	L 9–17

== Notable players ==
- QB Sam Adkins
- RB Ted Dean
- DL Mark Duckens
- C/LB Len Dugan
- DL Rick Dvorak
- DL Earl Edwards
- DB Miller Farr
- DL Jumpy Geathers
- DT/G Bob Hoskins
- K Bob Humphreys
- RB Bret Ingalls
- RB Randy Jackson
- TE Anthony Jones
- DE Jimmie Jones
- P/TE Terry Joyce
- LB Marv Kellum
- DL/T Roland Lakes
- FL/WR Bob Long
- RB Doug McEnulty
- QB Prince McJunkins
- QB Tom Owen
- QB Henry Schichtle
- LB Nelson Toburen
- DT Ted Vincent
- OL/LB Jim Waskiewicz
- OL Patrick Cain
- WR John Vinroe

=== Pro Football Hall of Fame ===
- Bill Parcells, Linebackers coach (1961–63), Hall of Famer as a coach

=== College Football Hall of Fame ===
- Jim Bausch, Halfback, 1927

=== All-Americans ===
- Lynn Duncan, DT- 1969 (AP-3rd Team)

== NCAA Records ==
- Longest field goal (tied) – Joe Williams 67 yards vs Southern Illinois October 21, 1978

== In popular culture ==
A fictional version of the program is shown in the Apple TV+ show Ted Lasso. The show depicts the Shockers winning a national championship at the NCAA Division II level under the titular character.

== See also ==
- Ackerman Island; some games were played between Fairmount College and Friends University in the 1920s at Ackerman Island in downtown Wichita.
