= Reuben F. Booth =

American athlete and coach (1878–1953)

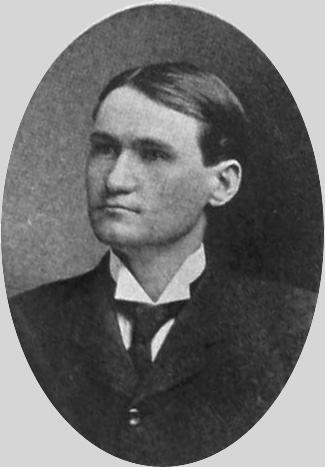
- Booth pictured in The Bell Clapper 1905, Kansas State yearbook

Biographical details
- Born: June 17, 1878
- Died: March 15, 1953 (aged 74); Olathe, Kansas, U.S.

Playing career

Football
- 1901–1902: Northwestern

Baseball
- 1899–1902: Northwestern
- Position: Third baseman (baseball)

Coaching career (HC unless noted)

Football
- 1904: Kansas State

Head coaching record
- Overall: 1–6

Reuben Fletcher Booth (June 7, 1878 – March 15, 1953) was an American college football and college baseball player and coach. He served as the ninth head football coach at Kansas State Agricultural College, now Kansas State University, holding the position for one season in 1904 and compiling a record of 1–6.

Booth attended high school in Evanston, Illinois, and graduated from Northwestern University in 1903 with a degree in mathematics. He played third base for Northwestern's baseball team, and lettered for the football team at Northwestern in 1901 and 1902.

After graduation, Booth moved to Kansas State in Manhattan, Kansas, to work as an assistant in the mathematics department. He coached the football team during the 1904 season. Booth also reportedly coached the Kansas State baseball team in 1905.

In 1906–07, Booth attended graduate school at the University of Chicago, and was at Purdue University the following year. He later settled permanently in Olathe, Kansas.

== Head coaching record ==
Year	Team	Overall	Conference	Standing	Bowl/playoffs
Kansas State Aggies (Independent) (1904)
1904	Kansas State	1–6			
Kansas State:		1–6			
Total:		1–6			
