= Wade Moore =

American athlete and coach (1876–1956)

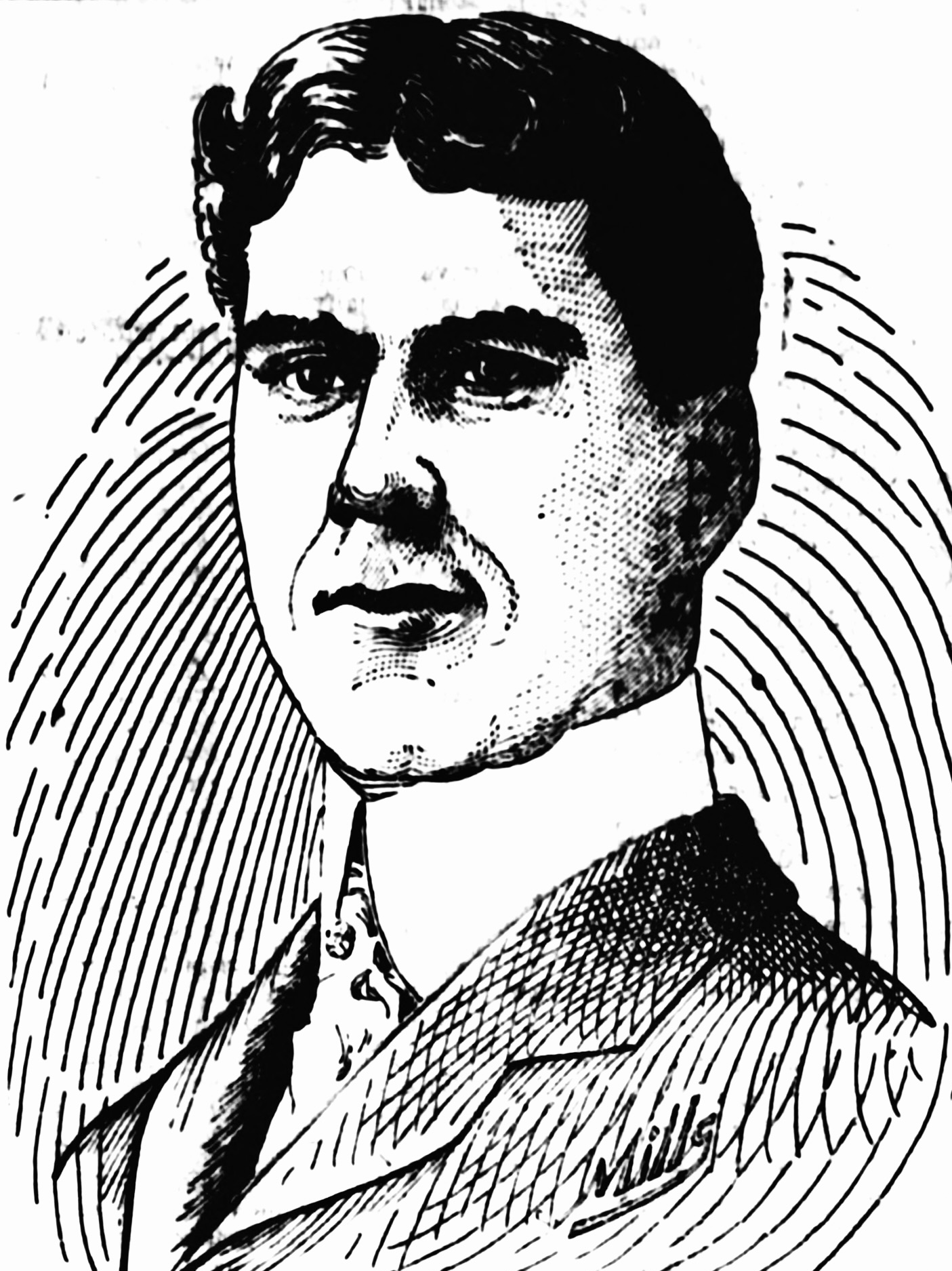

Biographical details
- Born: June 14, 1876; Franklin County, Kansas, U.S.
- Died: June 14, 1956 (aged 80); Anadarko, Oklahoma, U.S.

Playing career

Football
- 1899: Kansas

Baseball
- 1898–1899: Kansas
- 1902: Paris Homeseekers
- 1903–1904: San Antonio Bronchos
- 1904: Houston Lambs
- 1904: Beaumont Millionaires
- 1905: Houston Buffaloes
- 1906: Galveston Sand Crabs
- 1907: Houston Buffaloes
- Position: Catcher (baseball)

Coaching career (HC unless noted)

Football
- 1901: Kansas State

Baseball
- 1902: Paris Homeseekers
- 1903: San Antonio Bronchos
- 1905: Houston Buffaloes
- 1906: Galveston Sand Crabs
- 1907: Houston Buffaloes

Head coaching record
- Overall: 3–4–1 (college football)

Wade Hampton Moore (June 14, 1876 – June 14, 1956) was an American football and baseball player and coach.

== Biography ==
Moore was a graduate of the University of Kansas, lettering for the baseball team in 1898 and 1899, and the football team in 1899. Following his college playing career, Moore became the sixth head football coach for the Kansas State Wildcats in Manhattan, Kansas. He held that position for one season, in 1901, and his overall coaching record at Kansas State was 3 wins, 4 losses, and 1 tie. Moore also played in some of his team's games in 1901, kicking two field goals in a win over Bethany College.

After coaching football at Kansas State, Moore turned to playing and coaching minor league baseball From 1902 to 1907 he served as catcher and manager for a series of teams in Texas—in Paris, San Antonio, Houston and Galveston. In 1903, Moore served as player-manager-owner for the San Antonio Bronchos (also known as "Moore's Mustangs"), and led the team to the league championship. After the season ended, Moore sold the team and moved to the Houston Buffaloes. Moore then led the Buffaloes to a league championship in 1905. He was so popular in Houston that the team became known as "Wade's Wanderers" or "Moore's Marvel's".

Moore subsequently moved to Anadarko, Oklahoma, where he operated a movie theater and a company that manufactured baseball bats.

== Head coaching record ==
=== College football ===
Year	Team	Overall	Conference	Standing	Bowl/playoffs
Kansas State Aggies (Independent) (1901)
1901	Kansas State	3–4–1			
Kansas State:		3–4–1			
Total:		3–4–1			
