= Albert Hansen =

American football player, coach, and politician (1871–1943)

Biographical details
- Born: December 13, 1871; Dodge County, Nebraska, U.S.
- Died: 1943 (aged 71–72); Harlan, Iowa, U.S.

Playing career
- 1896–1898: Nebraska
- 1899: Kansas State
- Position: Guard

Coaching career (HC unless noted)
- 1899: Kansas State

Head coaching record
- Overall: 2–3

Albert Hansen (December 13, 1871 – 1943) was an American college football player, coach, and politician. He served as the fourth head football coach at Kansas State Agricultural College, now Kansas State University, holding the position for one season in 1899 and compiling a record of 2–3. Hansen was later elected to the Iowa House of Representatives.

== Early life and football career ==
Hansen was born in Dodge County, Nebraska, in 1871. In 1899, he graduated from the University of Nebraska, where he also lettered for three seasons playing left guard on the football team. After graduation, Hansen was hired as the fourth head football coach at Kansas State University in Manhattan, Kansas. He held that position for the 1899 season, posting a record of 2–3. Hansen also played with the Kansas State team in most of its games.

== Political and business career ==
Hansen left coaching after one season and moved to Harlan, Iowa, where he purchased the Harlan American newspaper. In 1912, Hansen was elected to the Iowa House of Representatives to represent Shelby County, Iowa. He served in the House from 1913 to 1915 as a Democrat.

== Head coaching record ==
Year	Team	Overall	Conference	Standing	Bowl/playoffs
Kansas State Aggies (Independent) (1899)
1899	Kansas State	2–3			
Kansas State:		2–3			
Total:		2–3			
