= A. W. Ehrsam =

American football coach

Biographical details
- Born: March 18, 1876; Dickinson County, Kansas, U.S.
- Died: December 27, 1941 (aged 65)

Coaching career (HC unless noted)
- 1897: Kansas State

Head coaching record
- Overall: 1–2–1

Arnold Winkelried "Jub" Ehrsam (March 18, 1876 – December 27, 1941) was an American college football coach. He served as the second head football coach for the Kansas State Agricultural College, now Kansas State University. He held the position for one season in 1897, compiling a record of 1–2–1. Although listed as the second coach for the school, he was reportedly the first to be paid for the position.

Ehrsam was a native of Dickinson County, Kansas. His father was the founder of the J. B. Ehrsam & Sons Manufacturing Company, which manufactured and sold machinery for mills, and where Arnold was employed.

== Head coaching record ==
Year	Team	Overall	Conference	Standing	Bowl/playoffs
Kansas State Aggies (Independent) (1897)
1897	Kansas State	1–2–1			
Kansas State:		1–2–1			
Total:		1–2–1			
