= 1897 Lincoln Tigers football team =

American college football season

1897 Lincoln Tigers football
- Conference: Midwestern Black Schools and HBCU's
- Record: 0–1 (0–0 or 0–1 Midwestern Black Schools and HBCU's)

1897 Midwestern Black Schools and HBCU football standings
	Conf.					Overall
Team	W		L		T	W		L		T
Lincoln High School (KC) $	1	–	0	–	0	1	–	0	–	0
Western University	0	–	1	–	0	0	–	1	–	0
Lincoln (MO)	0	–	0	–	0	0	–	1	–	0
$ – Conference champion

The 1897 Lincoln Tigers football team represented Lincoln Institute—now known as Lincoln University—in Jefferson City, Missouri and competed with other midwestern HBCU's during the 1897 college football season. This was the second season that Lincoln fielded a football team. The Tigers of Lincoln played the Excelsior football team of Columbia. Information regarding this season is sparse.

== Schedule ==
Date	Opponent	Site	Result	Source
November 16	Excelsior football team of Columbia		L 0–24	
