= 1929 Kansas Jayhawks football team =

American college football season

1929 Kansas Jayhawks football
- Conference: Big Six Conference
- Record: 4–4 (2–3 Big 6)
- Head coach: Bill Hargiss (2nd season)
- Captain: Steward Lyman
- Home stadium: Memorial Stadium

1929 Big Six Conference football standings
| | Conf. | | | | | Overall |
| Team | W | | L | | T | W | | L | | T |
|---|---|---|---|---|---|---|---|---|---|---|
| No. 7 Nebraska $ | 3 | – | 0 | – | 2 | 4 | – | 1 | – | 3 |
| Missouri | 3 | – | 1 | – | 1 | 5 | – | 2 | – | 1 |
| Kansas State | 3 | – | 2 | – | 0 | 3 | – | 5 | – | 0 |
| Oklahoma | 2 | – | 2 | – | 1 | 3 | – | 3 | – | 2 |
| Kansas | 2 | – | 3 | – | 0 | 4 | – | 4 | – | 0 |
| Iowa State | 0 | – | 5 | – | 0 | 1 | – | 7 | – | 0 |
$ – Conference champion; Rankings from Dickinson System

The 1929 Kansas Jayhawks football team represented the University of Kansas in the Big Six Conference during the 1929 college football season. In their second season under head coach Bill Hargiss, the Jayhawks compiled a 4–4 record (2–3 against conference opponents), finished in fifth place in the conference, and outscored opponents by a combined total of 97 to 50. They played their home games at Memorial Stadium in Lawrence, Kansas. Steward Lyman was the team captain.

== Schedule ==
| Date | Opponent | Site | Result | Attendance | Source |
|---|---|---|---|---|---|
| October 5 | at Illinois* | Memorial Stadium; Champaign, IL | L 0–25 | | |
| October 12 | Kansas State Normal* | Memorial Stadium; Lawrence, KS | W 38–0 | | |
| October 19 | Kansas State | Memorial Stadium; Lawrence, KS (rivalry) | L 0–6 | | |
| October 26 | at Iowa State | State Field; Ames, IA | W 33–0 | | |
| November 2 | at Nebraska | Memorial Stadium; Lincoln, NE (rivalry) | L 6–12 | | |
| November 9 | at Oklahoma | Memorial Stadium; Norman, OK | W 7–0 | | |
| November 16 | Washington University* | Memorial Stadium; Lawrence, KS | W 13–0 | 3,000 | |
| November 23 | Missouri^{†} | Memorial Stadium; Lawrence, KS (rivalry) | L 0–7 | | |
*Non-conference game; ^{†}Homecoming
