= 1929 Iowa State Cyclones football team =

American college football season

1929 Iowa State Cyclones football
- Conference: Big Six Conference
- Record: 1–7 (0–5 Big 6)
- Head coach: C. Noel Workman (4th season)
- Captains: Harry Johnson; Ed Schlenker
- Home stadium: State Field

1929 Big Six Conference football standings
	Conf.					Overall
Team	W		L		T	W		L		T
No. 7 Nebraska $	3	–	0	–	2	4	–	1	–	3
Missouri	3	–	1	–	1	5	–	2	–	1
Kansas State	3	–	2	–	0	3	–	5	–	0
Oklahoma	2	–	2	–	1	3	–	3	–	2
Kansas	2	–	3	–	0	4	–	4	–	0
Iowa State	0	–	5	–	0	1	–	7	–	0
$ – Conference champion; Rankings from Dickinson System

The 1929 Iowa State Cyclones football team represented Iowa State College of Agricultural and Mechanic Arts (later renamed Iowa State University) in the Big Six Conference during the 1929 college football season. In their fourth season under head coach C. Noel Workman, the Cyclones compiled a 1–7 record (0–5 against conference opponents), finished in last place in the conference, and were outscored by opponents by a combined total of 135 to 54. They played their home games at State Field in Ames, Iowa.

Harry Johnson and Ed Schlenker were the team captains. Maynard Spear was selected as a first-team all-conference player.

== Schedule ==
Date	Time	Opponent	Site	Result	Attendance	Source
October 5	2:30 pm	Grinnell*	State Field; Ames, IA	W 27–7	3,493	
October 12	2:30 pm	Missouri	State Field; Ames, IA (rivalry)	L 0–19	4,011	
October 18	8:00 pm	at Marquette*	Marquette Stadium; Milwaukee, WI	L 6–14	19,000	
October 26	2:00 pm	Kansas^{†}	State Field; Ames, IA	L 0–33	5,277	
November 2	2:30 pm	at Oklahoma	Oklahoma Memorial Stadium; Norman, OK	L 7–21	3,239	
November 9	2:00 pm	at Kansas State	Memorial Stadium; Manhattan, KS (rivalry)	L 2–3	3,998	
November 16	2:00 pm	Drake*	State Field; Ames, IA	L 0–7	9,950	
November 28	2:00 pm	at Nebraska	Memorial Stadium; Lincoln, NE (rivalry)	L 12–31	11,149	
*Non-conference game; ^{†}Homecoming; All times are in Central time
