= 1929 Pittsburgh Panthers football team =

American college football season

1929 Pittsburgh Panthers football
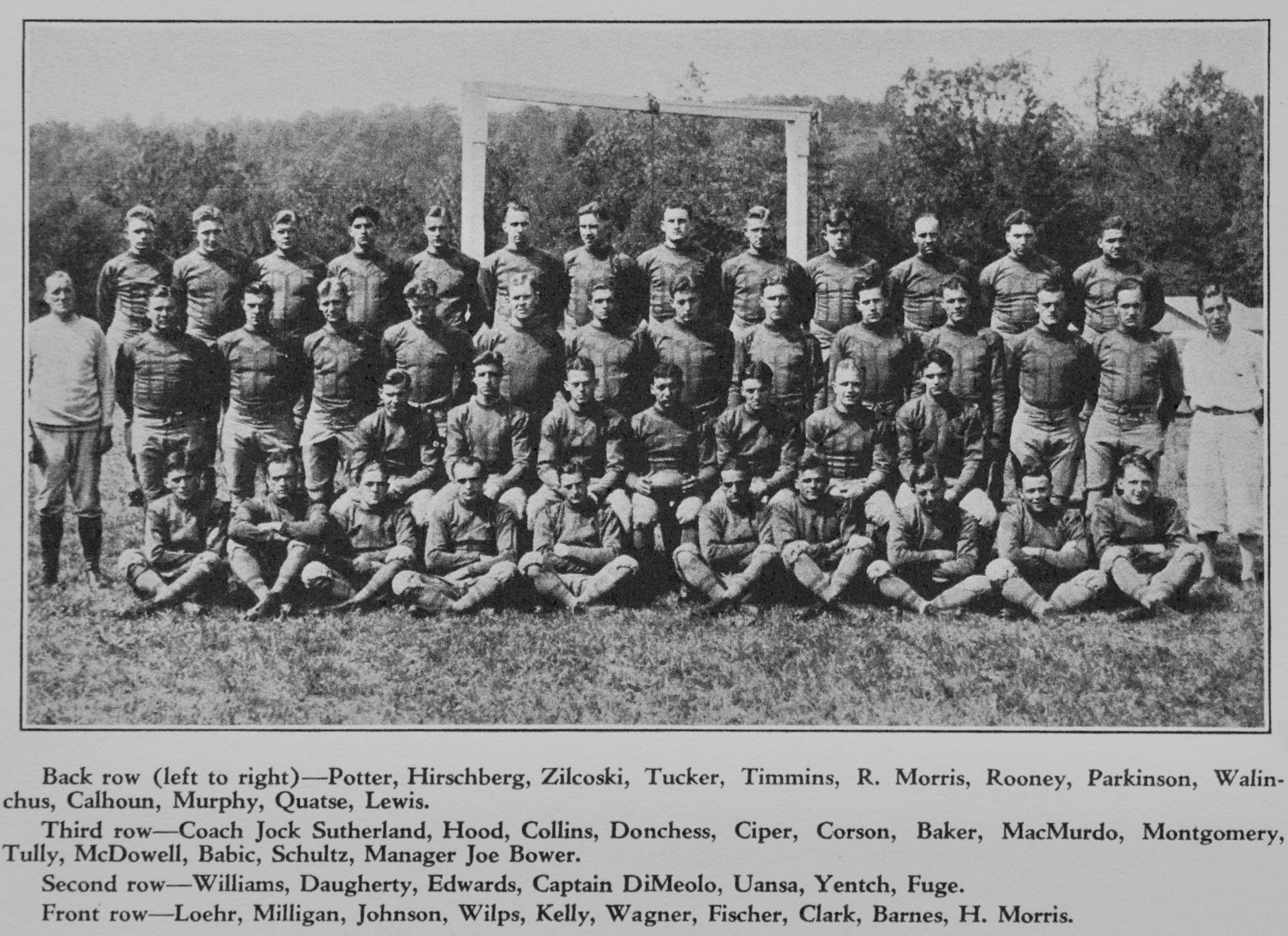

National champion (Davis) Eastern champion

Rose Bowl, L 14–47 vs USC
- Conference: Independent
- Record: 9–1
- Head coach: Jock Sutherland (6th season)
- Offensive scheme: Single-wing
- Captain: Luby DiMeolo
- Home stadium: Pitt Stadium

1929 Eastern college football independents records
	Conf.			Overall
Team	W	L	T	W		L		T
No. 3 Pittsburgh		–		9	–	1	–	0
Colgate		–		8	–	1	–	0
Fordham		–		7	–	0	–	2
Bucknell		–		8	–	2	–	0
No. 11 Penn		–		7	–	2	–	0
Boston College		–		7	–	2	–	1
Villanova		–		7	–	2	–	1
Cornell		–		6	–	2	–	0
Tufts		–		5	–	1	–	2
Harvard		–		5	–	2	–	1
Yale		–		5	–	2	–	1
NYU		–		7	–	3	–	0
Franklin & Marshall		–		6	–	3	–	0
Penn State		–		6	–	3	–	0
Syracuse		–		6	–	3	–	0
Washington & Jefferson		–		5	–	2	–	2
Drexel		–		6	–	3	–	1
Temple		–		6	–	3	–	1
Carnegie Tech		–		5	–	3	–	1
Army		–		6	–	4	–	1
Providence		–		3	–	3	–	2
Brown		–		5	–	5	–	0
Columbia		–		4	–	5	–	0
CCNY		–		2	–	4	–	2
Princeton		–		2	–	4	–	1
Boston University		–		3	–	6	–	0
Vermont		–		2	–	7	–	0
Rankings from Dickinson System

The 1929 Pittsburgh Panthers football team, coached by Jock Sutherland, represented the University of Pittsburgh in the 1929 college football season. The Panthers finished the regular season undefeated and were considered the champions of the East, and by some, a national championship team. The Panthers concluded the season by traveling by train to California, losing to USC in the Rose Bowl. According to a 1967 Sports Illustrated article, football pioneer Parke H. Davis, whose “outstanding nationwide team” selections for 1869 to 1933 (all made in 1933) are recognized as "major" in the official NCAA football records book, named Pitt that season's national champion. The article contained a "list of college football's mythical champions as selected by every recognized authority [sic] since 1924," which has served as the basis of the university's historical national championship claims, with Davis being the only selector of Pitt in 1929. The team is also recognized as a co-national champion in 1929 by College Football Data Warehouse, along with Notre Dame, the pick of nine major selectors.

== Schedule ==
Date	Opponent	Site	Result	Attendance	Source
September 28	Waynesburg	Pitt Stadium; Pittsburgh, PA	W 53–0	9,000	
October 5	at Duke	Duke Stadium; Durham, NC	W 52–7	20,000	
October 12	West Virginia	Pitt Stadium; Pittsburgh, PA (rivalry)	W 27–7	27,000–30,000	
October 19	at Nebraska	Memorial Stadium; Lincoln, NE	W 12–7	35,000	
October 26	at Allegheny	Municipal Stadium; Erie, PA	W 40–0	8,000	
November 2	Ohio State^{†}	Pitt Stadium; Pittsburgh, PA	W 18–2	51,000	
November 9	Washington & Jefferson	Pitt Stadium; Pittsburgh, PA	W 21–0	30,000	
November 16	Carnegie Tech	Pitt Stadium; Pittsburgh, PA	W 34–13	54,000	
November 28	Penn State	Pitt Stadium; Pittsburgh, PA (rivalry)	W 20–7	25,755–30,000	
January 1, 1930	vs. USC	Rose Bowl; Pasadena, CA (Rose Bowl)	L 14–47	71,000	
^{†}Homecoming

== Preseason ==
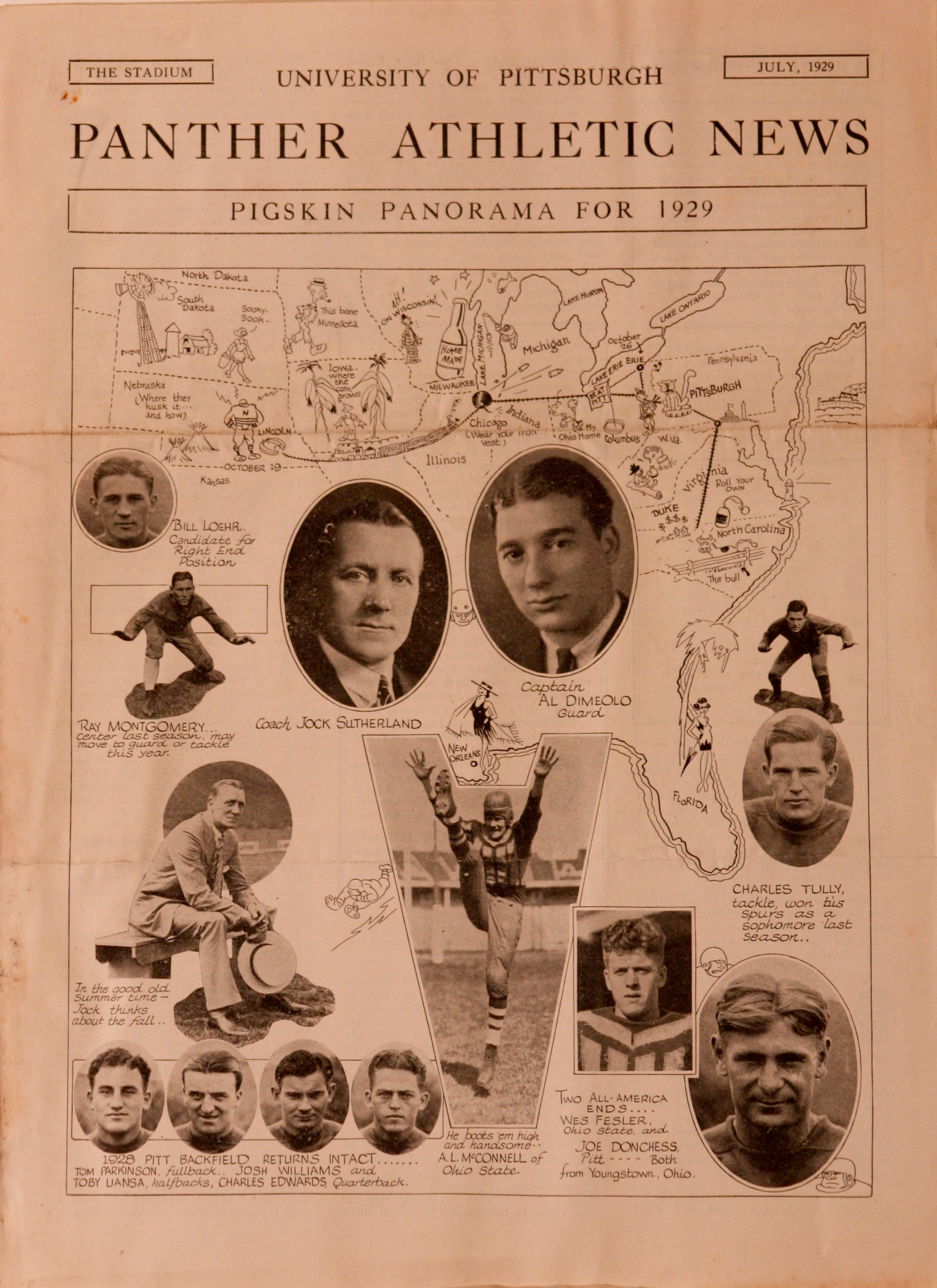
1929 Season Ticket Brochure

After five years as coach of the Panthers, Coach Sutherland's record was 32–9–5. The Athletic Council approved raising the player stipend from $500 to $650 a year, plus tuition and books, so he could continue to recruit top-notch talent.

Pitt and Carnegie Tech shared the use of Pitt Stadium from the 1929 season through the 1943 season. For $18.00 one could purchase a season ticket for all nine games scheduled at the stadium.

James Hagan, former Pitt halfback, was appointed Assistant Director of Athletics and assumed his duties on February 4, 1929.

Dr. H. A. R. Shanor replaced team doctor Oliver Kendrick who resigned his position to set up practice in Duquesne.

Joseph Bower, a senior in the School of Business Administration, was chosen student manager of the 1929 football team.

The outlook for the 1929 season was promising since only three starters (Alex Fox, Albert Guarino and Mike Getto) and four substitutes (James Scanlon, Ted Helsing, Ed Sherako and Philip Goldberg) had graduated. Coach Sutherland welcomed 75 aspirants to spring practice on March 21 and trained the squad for six weeks. The Pittsburgh Press noted: "Coach Sutherland is well satisfied with the results of the spring workouts and believes his squad will be strong offensively during the autumn campaign. Reserve strength, barring scholastic difficulties, should be plentiful."

Coach Sutherland invited 41 lads to the preseason drills at Camp Hamilton. A hospital and dispensary were now available on site. The camp lasted two and a half weeks with two practice sessions daily. Coach Sutherland worked the team hard because as noted by David Finoli: "He truly believed in the famous quote that his mentor Pop Warner muttered so many times: 'You play the way you practice'." The Panthers returned to Pittsburgh a week prior to the home opener with Waynesburg College "in as fine condition and with as brilliant prospects as any Pitt team has ever boasted." The Panthers roster was strong as the Pittsburgh Press noted: "Apparently, there are no such things as varsity and second teams out where the Golden Panthers are sharpening their claws for nine weeks of feasting, or fasting. There are just two evenly-matched elevens, with not much to choose between them."

A tarp was purchased to cover the stadium gridiron and insure the playing surface would be in great condition regardless of the weather.

== Coaching staff ==
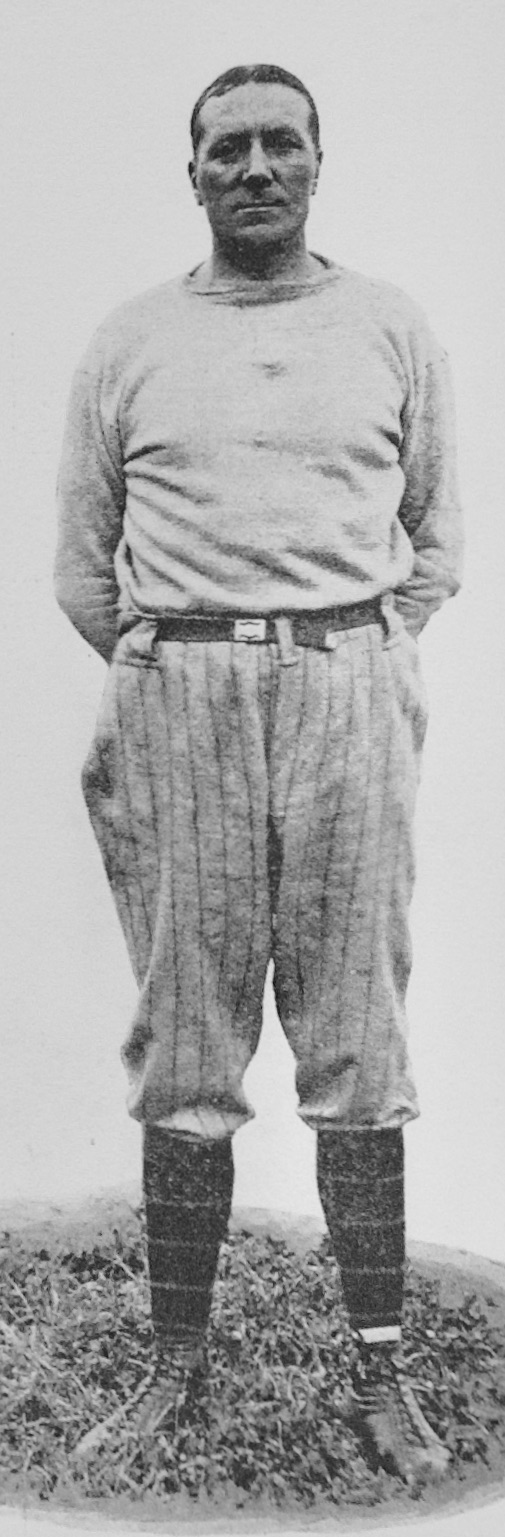
Coach Sutherland

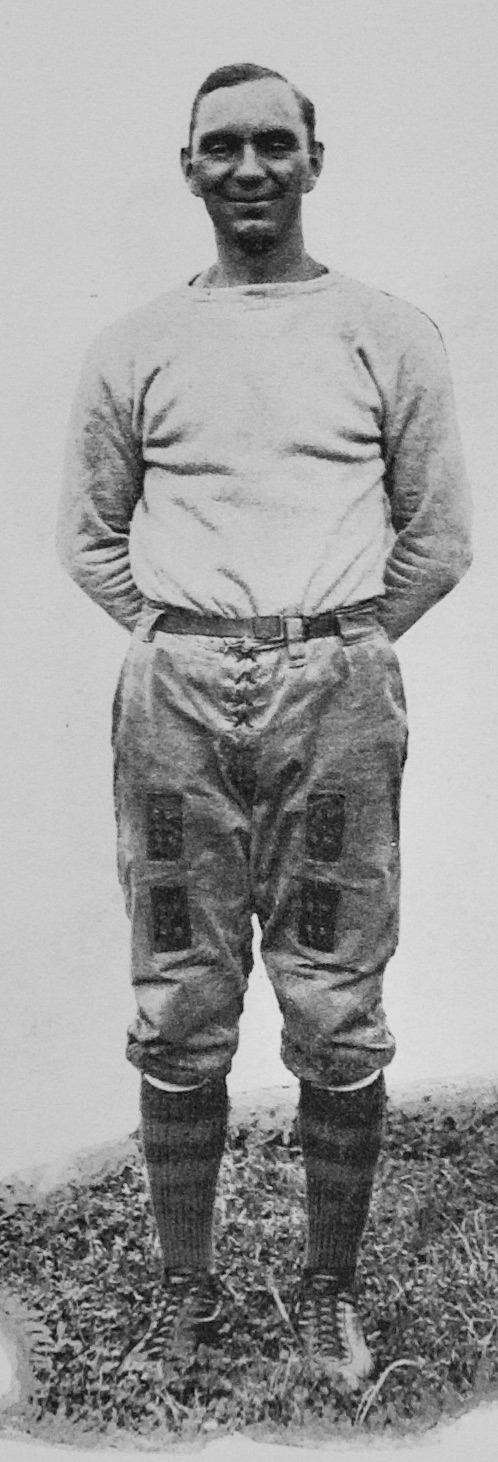
Charley Bowser

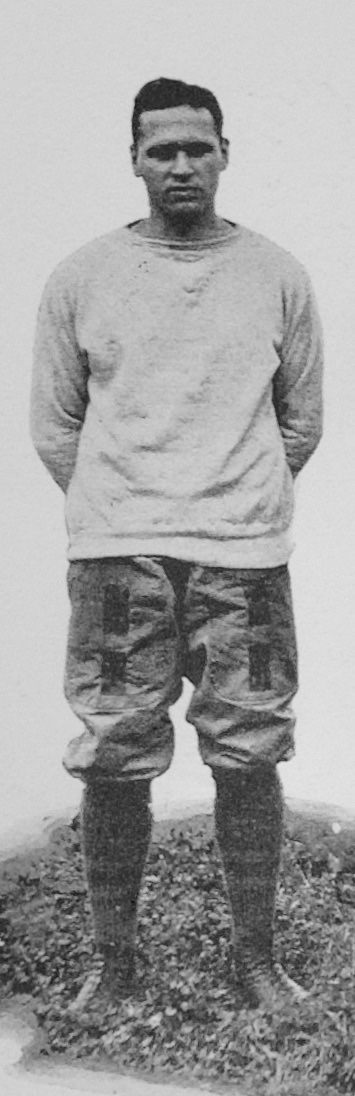
Paul Templeton

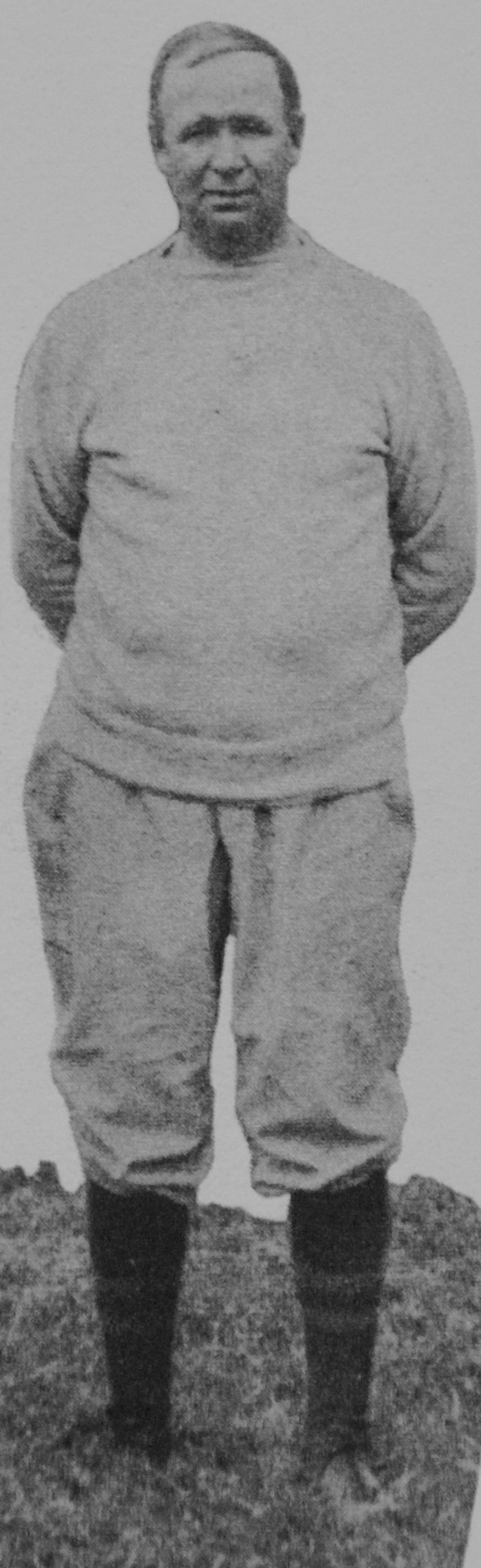
Alex Stevenson

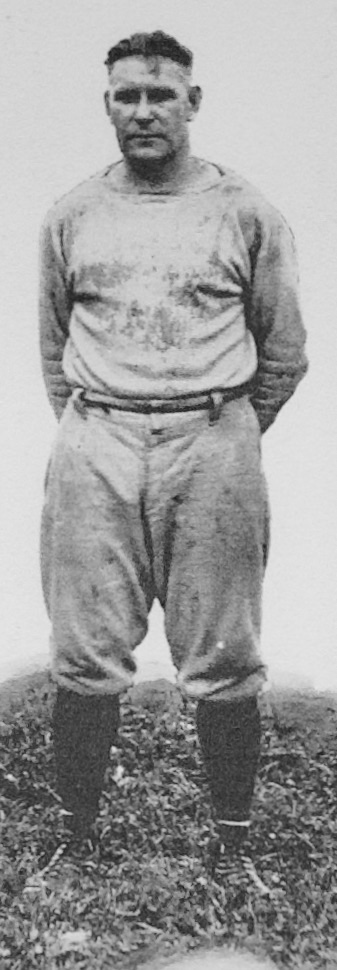
Roscoe Gougler

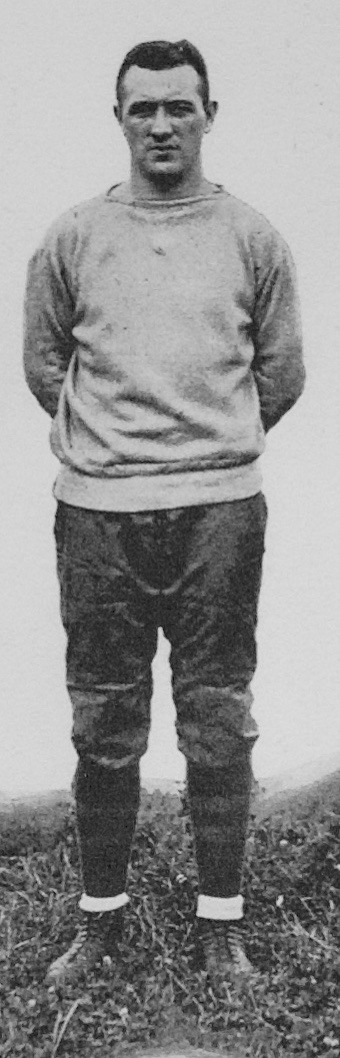
Zoner Wissinger

1929 Pittsburgh Panthers football staff
Coaching staff: John B. "Jock" Sutherland – Head coach; Charley Bowser – Assistant coach; Paul Templeton – part-time assistant coach; Alexander Stevenson – Assistant coach - scout; Roscoe “Skip” Gougler – Freshman coach; Zoner Wissinger– freshmen coach	Support staff: Joseph Bower– student football manager; Dr. H. A. R. Shanor – team physician; George Moore – team trainer; Percy S. Browne – custodian of equipment; W. D. Harrison - director of athletics; James Hagan – assistant director of athletics

== Roster ==
1929 Pittsburgh Panthers football roster
Player	Position	Games	Weight	Class	School	Prep School	Hometown
Albert DiMeolo*	guard	10	176	1930	Dental School	Bellefonte Academy	Coraopolis, Pa.
Joe Donchess*	end	10	166	1930	Medical School	Wyoming Seminary	Youngstown, O.
Charles Tully*	tackle	10	181	1931	Business Adm.	Warwood H. S.	Wheeling, W. Va.
Ray Montgomery*	guard	9	181	1930	Business Adm.	Warwood H. S.	Wheeling, W. Va.
Ralph Daugherty*	center	9	174	1932		Bellefonte Academy	Freeport, Pa
James MacMurdo*	tackle	9	189	1932		Ellwood City H. S.	Ellwood City, Pa.
William Loehr	end	9	156	1931		Turtle Creek H. S.	Turtle Creek, Pa.
Paul Collins*	end	10	178	1932	Business Adm.	Trinity Prep	Sioux City, Ia.
Charles Edwards*	quarterback	9	172	1930	Bachelor of Science, College	Wyoming Seminary	Moundsville, W. Va.
Octavius Uansa*	halfback	9	168	1930	College	McKees Rocks H. S.	McKees Rocks, Pa.
Harold “Josh” Williams*	halfback	7	166	1931	Education	Mars H. S.	Mars, Pa.
Tom Parkinson*	halfback	7	196	1930	Dental School	California H. S.	California, Pa.
Edward Baker*	quarterback	9	166	1931	Dental School	Nanticoke H. S.	Nanticoke, Pa.
James Rooney*	halfback	9	167	1930	Dental School	Bellefonte Academy	Pittsburgh, Pa.
William Walinchus*	halfback	9	169	1931	Dental School	Mahanoy City H. S.	Mahanoy City, Pa.
Franklin Hood	halfback	5	195	1931		Bellefonte Academy	Monaca, Pa.
Joe Tommins	end	4	169	1932	Education	Farrell H. S.	Farrell, Pa.
Jesse Quatse*	tackle	9	195	1933	Dental School	Greensburg H. S.	Rillton, Pa.
Walter Milligan	guard	7	168	1933	Education	Kiski School	McKees Rocks, Pa.
Markley Barnes	center	6	172	1929	Business Adm.	Broaddus Academy	Wellsburg, W. Va.
Hart Morris*	guard	9	175	1932	Bachelor of Science, College	Bellaire H. S.	Bellaire, Ohio
Vladimar Babic	tackle	9	177	1932	Bachelor of Arts, College	Duquesne H. S.	Duquesne, Pa.
Harry Wagner	quarterback	8	158	1931	Business Adm.	Schenley H. S.	Pittsburgh, Pa.
James Clark*	fullback	8	162	1932		Kiski School	Greensburg, Pa.
Edward Hirschberg*	end	8	173	1932	Bachelor of Arts, College	McKeesport H. S.	East McKeesport, Pa.
Ernest Lewis	guard	4	184	1931	Dental School	Steelton H. S.	Steelton, Pa.
R. Felix Wilps	halfback	4	158	1930	Civil Engineering	Norwin H. S.	Irwin, Pa.
Arthur L. Corson	tackle	2	189	1930	Business Adm.	Wyoming Seminary	New Albany, Pa.
Al Ciper	tackle	4	180	1931		Glenwillard H. S.	Glenwillard, Pa.
Daniel Fuge	guard	1	174	1931			Pittsburgh, Pa.
Robert Morris	center	4	179	1932	Bachelor of Arts, College	Bellaire H. S.	Bellaire, Ohio
Edward Schultz	halfback	4	160	1931	Bachelor of Arts, College	St. Thomas Prep.	West Pittston, Pa.
Leo Murphy	halfback	6	178	1932		South H. S.	Youngstown, Ohio
Frank Fisher	guard	1	185	1931	Dental School	Allegheny H. S.	Pittsburgh, Pa.
Jack Kelly	halfback	1	153	1932	Dental School	Latrobe H. S.	Latrobe, Pa.
Fred Johnson	halfback	1	149	1932			Sioux City, Iowa
Herman Yentch	guard	1	175	1932	Business Adm.	Perkiomen Prep	Harrisburg, Pa.
Walter Potter	fullback	1	169	1932			Somerville, N.J.
T. H. McDowell	quarterback	1	164	1932			Wilkinsburg, Pa.
Richard Calhoun	guard	0	181	1931			Pittsburgh, Pa.
Walter Zilcoski	guard	0	179	1933	Dental School		Johnsonburg, Pa.
Joseph Bower*	manager			1931	Business Adm.	St.Joseph's H. S.	Oil City, Pa.
* Letterman

== Game summaries ==
=== Waynesburg ===
Week 1: Waynesburg at Pitt

Team	1	2	3	4	Total
Waynesburg	0	0	0	0	0
• Pitt	7	7	6	6	26

- Date: September 28, 1929
- Location: Pitt Stadium
  Pittsburgh, PA
- Game start: 2:00 p.m.
- Referee: D. W. Very (Penn State)

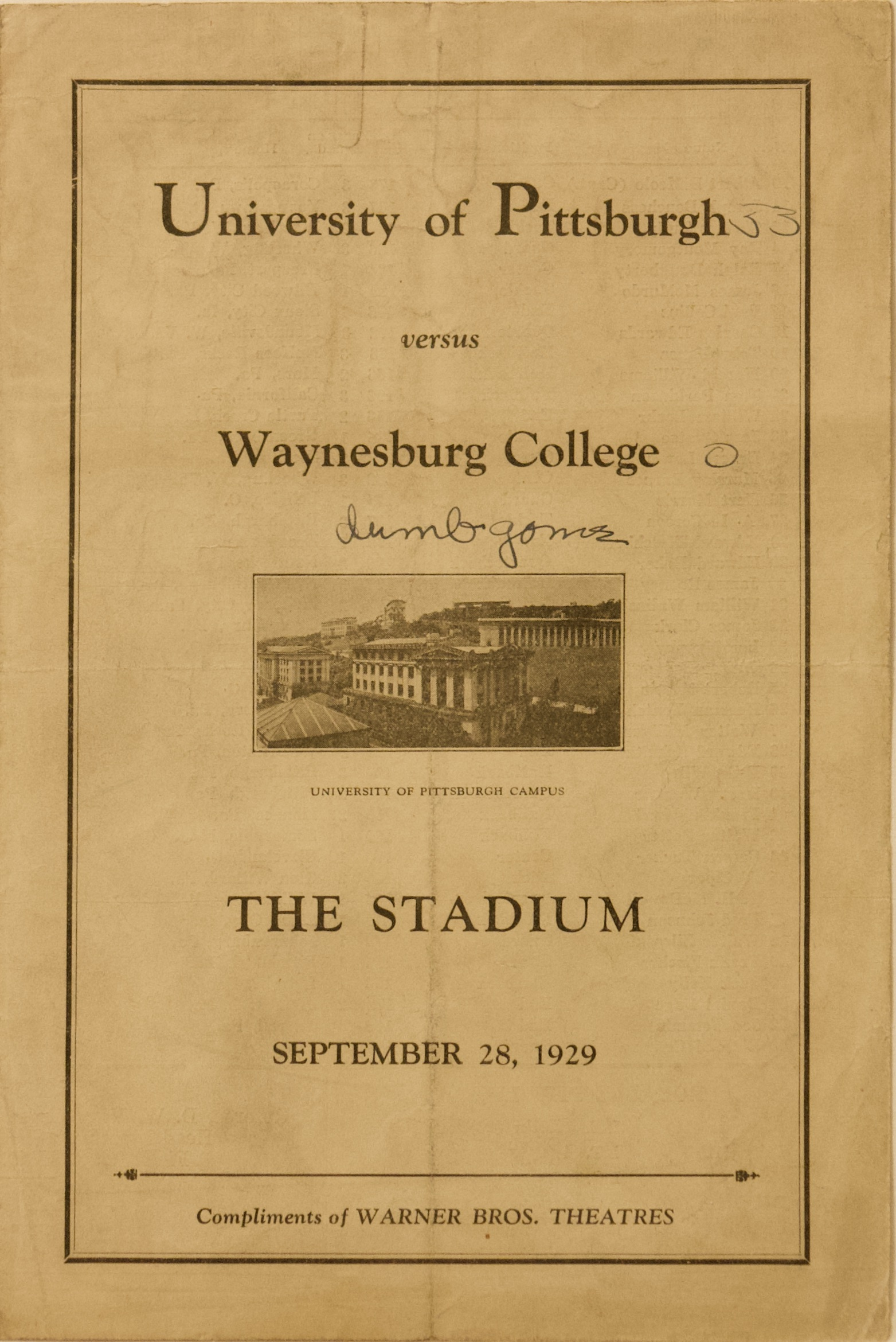
Program for September 28, 1929 Pitt vs. Waynesburg game

The Panthers home opener was against Waynesburg College. The Panthers and the Yellow Jackets had not played in nineteen years. Pitt lost to the Yellow Jackets 14 to 5 in 1897, but the Panthers gained revenge in 1904 by the lopsided score of 83 to 0 and then with a 42 to 0 victory in 1910. Second-year coach Frank N. Wolf was looking to improve the Yellow Jackets record of 0-6 in 1928. The Jackets beat St. Vincent 19 to 6 to open their season.

The Panthers wore new uniforms for the home opener - blue and gold sateen jerseys with tan trousers and blue helmets with gold cross-pieces. The field was protected by the cover purchased over the summer so a dry field was assured.

Harry Keck of the Sun-Telegraph reported: "Under a warm sun and with only about 9,000 fans looking on, another powerful University of Pittsburgh football eleven made its bow at the Stadium Saturday afternoon, showing promise of great things in the games to come by the manner in which, with first, second and third-string men in action, it romped over the squad of Waynesburg College for eight touchdowns and an impressive 53–0 victory."

The Panther offense established superiority early with two touchdowns in the opening period. Tom Parkinson and Josh Williams scored the touchdowns. The Panthers added three more touchdowns in the second stanza. William Walinchus and Parkinson scored on running plays. The third tally came on a pass from Parkinson to Joe Donchess, which Donchess caught while lying flat on the ground in the end zone. The halftime score read Pitt 33 to Waynesburg 0. The three touchdowns in the second half were scored by Parkinson, Walinchus and third-team halfback Fred Johnson. The extra points were done by committee as Parkinson and James Rooney each converted twice and Edward Baker once. Coach Sutherland substituted often and thirty-five Panthers saw action. Waynesburg finished the season with a 5–4 record.

The Pitt starting lineup for the game against Waynesburg was Joe Donchess (left end), Charles Tully (left tackle), Ray Montgomery (left guard), Ralph Daugherty (center), Albert DiMeolo (right guard), James MacMurdo (right tackle), William Loehr (right end), Charles Edwards (quarterback), Toby Uansa (left halfback), Josh Williams (right halfback) and Tom Parkinson (fullback). Substitutes appearing in the game for Pitt were Edward Baker, James Rooney, William Walinchus, Frank Hood, Joe Tommins, Jesse Quatse, Walter Milligan, Markley Barnes, Hart Morris, Vladimir Babic, Paul Collins, Al Ciper, Daniel Fuge, Robert Morris, Frank Fisher, Arthur Corson, Edward Schultz, Harry Wagner, Jack Kelly, Felix Wilps, Fred Johnson, James Clark and Walter Potter.

=== At Duke ===
Week 2: Pitt at Duke

Team	1	2	3	4	Total
• Pitt	19	7	20	6	52
Duke	0	0	0	7	7

- Date: October 5, 1929
- Location: Duke Stadium
  Durham, NC
- Game start: 2:00 p.m.
- Game attendance: 20,000
- Referee: C. W. Streit, Jr. (Washington & Lee)

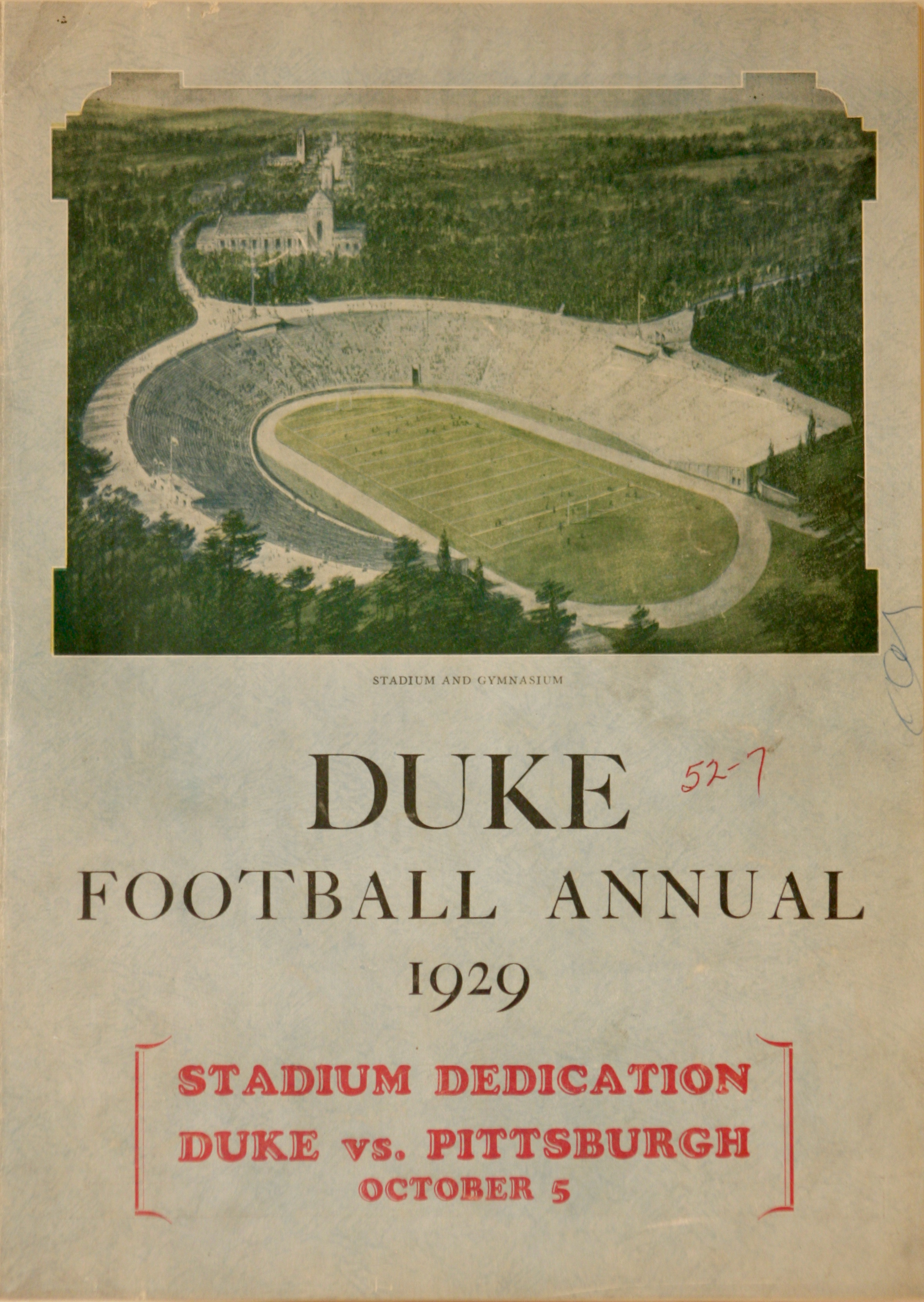
Program for October 5, 1929 Duke vs. Pitt game

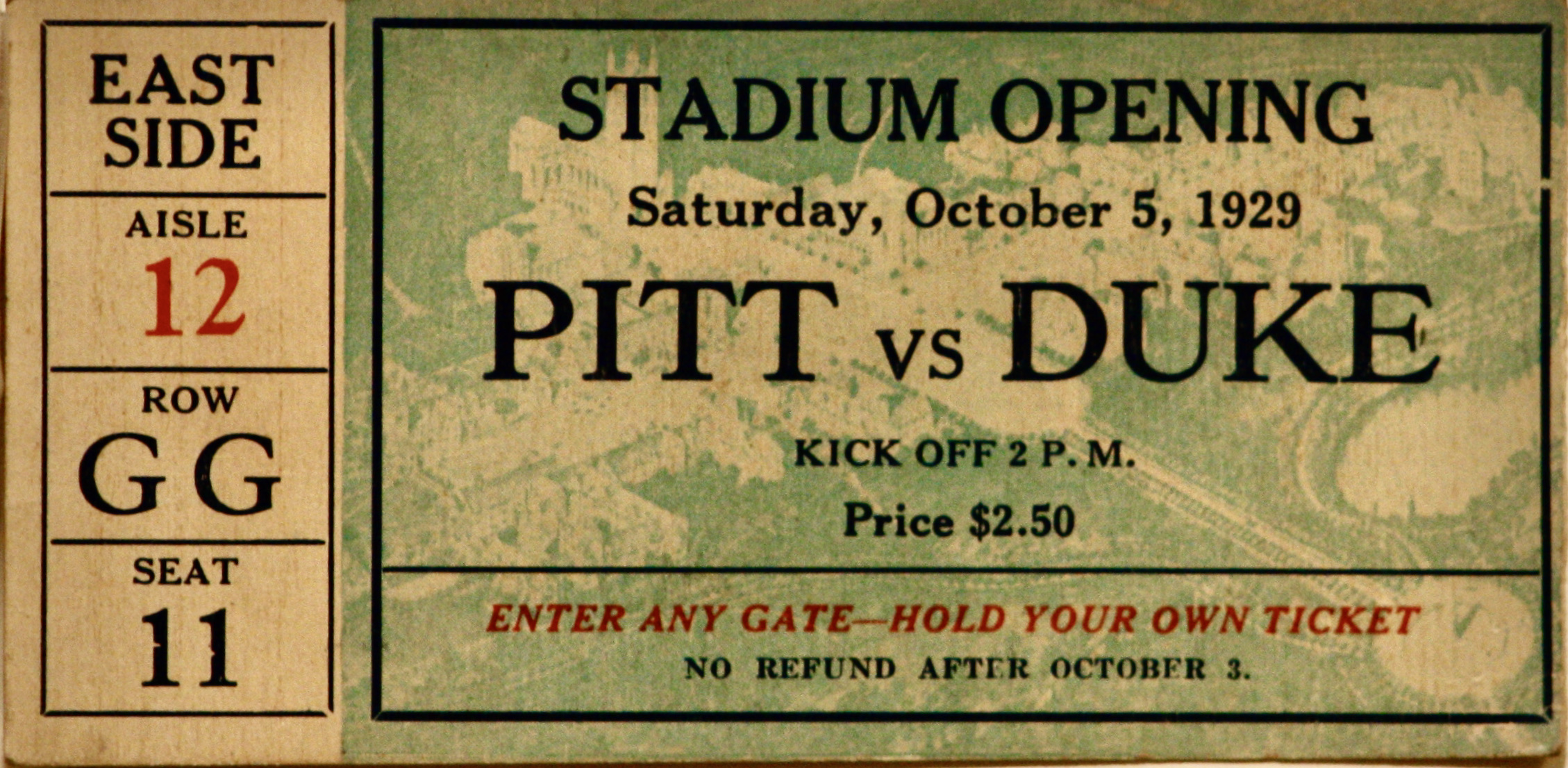
Ticket for October 5, 1929 Duke v. Pitt game

The first road trip of the season took the Panthers to Durham, NC to both battle the Duke Blue Devil eleven and take part in the dedication of their new 35,000 seat stadium. This was Pitt's first trip to the "deep-south" for a football game. The train departed Pittsburgh Wednesday night and arrived in Washington D.C., on Thursday morning. David Finoli noted: "While in the nation's capital, the team got the chance to meet President Herbert Hoover and have their picture taken with him as they visited the White House. They would have the honor of being the first college football team to visit the White House in Hoover's tenure." Sightseeing and a luncheon were followed by practice on the Georgetown Field. Thursday night the squad was back on the train and arrived in Durham Friday morning. Friday's practice was held at the University of North Carolina stadium in Chapel Hill. For the dedication game, the team wore a special hot weather uniform of blue silk with gold trim across the shoulders, and blue helmets with gold crosspieces. The 70-piece Pitt marching band made the trip and took part in the festivities.

Duke coach James DeHart, Pitt's first four-sport letterman, "is conceded to have one of the best teams ever developed in the South, and with football interest of the whole section focused on the big intersectional game at Durham, the Blue Devils will be primed for the Panthers." Coach DeHart was pessimistic when he spoke to The Pittsburgh Press: "We cannot hope to win. I only hope that Jock won't run it up too high on me." Henry Kistler, Duke captain and star tackle, was injured in the previous game against Mercer and was out of the lineup.

The Pittsburgh Press noted: 'At Chapel Hill, where hostility to Duke runs high, the North Carolina boys were unanimous in declaring that the Panthers would triumph. They hoped it would be an overwhelming setback for the Durham lads, they said."

The Panthers were healthy, but Coach Sutherland made two changes to the starting lineup - Edward Baker replaced Charles Edwards at quarterback and Paul Collins replaced William Loehr at end.

The News and Observer reported: "Pitt's powerful Panthers performing perfectly more often than not, showed 20,000 football fans and stadium connoisseurs a great grid machine here today as they rolled up a 52 to 7 score against Duke's Blue Devil in the dedication game of this university's new stadium."

The Duke defense could not stop Pitt's running attack. The Panthers received the opening kick-off and Toby Uansa raced from his 7-yard line to the Duke 45-yard line before he was downed. Six plays later Harold Williams sprinted the last 7 yards for the touchdown. The Pitt defense forced a punt and got possession on their 42-yard line. After gaining a first down, Williams scampered 40 yards around end for his second score of the game. Duke went to the air and advanced the ball to the Pitt 20-yard line, but lost the ball on downs. On second down Uansa dashed 78 yards for the third tally of the first quarter and Tom Parkinson converted the point after Pitt led 19 to 0. Early in the second quarter the Blue Devils advanced to the Pitt 24-yard line, but again lost the ball on downs. On first down Uansa took the handoff and rambled 76 yards for his second touchdown of the game. Parkinson converted the point after and Pitt led 26 to 0. Sutherland removed the starting lineup for the remainder of the game. James Rooney scored twice in the third quarter on runs of 58 and 45 yards and William Walinchus added a touchdown scamper of 47 yards. The Panthers also earned a safety in the period to bring the score to 46 to 0. Edward Schultz scored the final Pitt touchdown on a pass play from Frank Hood in the last quarter. Duke scored in the last minutes on a 53-yard pass play from Sam Buie to Robert Beaver. Buie kicked the point after and the final score read - Pitt 52 to Duke 7. Duke finished the season with a 4–6 record.

The Pitt starting lineup for the game against Duke was Joe Donchess (left end), Charles Tully (left tackle), Ray Montgomery (left guard), Ralph Daugherty (center), Albert DiMeolo (right guard), James MacMurdo (right tackle), Paul Collins (right end), Edward Baker (quarterback), Toby Uansa (left halfback), Josh Williams (right halfback) and Tom Parkinson (fullback). Substitutes appearing in the game for Pitt were Charles Edwards, James Rooney, Edward Hirschberg, Vladimir Babic, Jesse Quatse, James Clark, Hart Morris, Markley Barnes, Walter Milligan, William Loehr, William Walinchus, Arthur Corson, Joe Tommins, Harry Wagner, Al Ciper, Felix Wilps, Herman Yentch, Edward Schultz, Frank Hood, Robert Morris and Ernest Lewis.

=== West Virginia ===
Week 3: West Virginia at Pitt

Team	1	2	3	4	Total
West Virginia	0	0	7	0	7
• Pitt	7	7	13	0	27

- Date: October 12, 1929
- Location: Pitt Stadium
  Pittsburgh, PA
- Game start: 2:00 p.m.
- Game attendance: 30,000
- Game weather: warm
- Referee: John P. Egan (Duquesne)

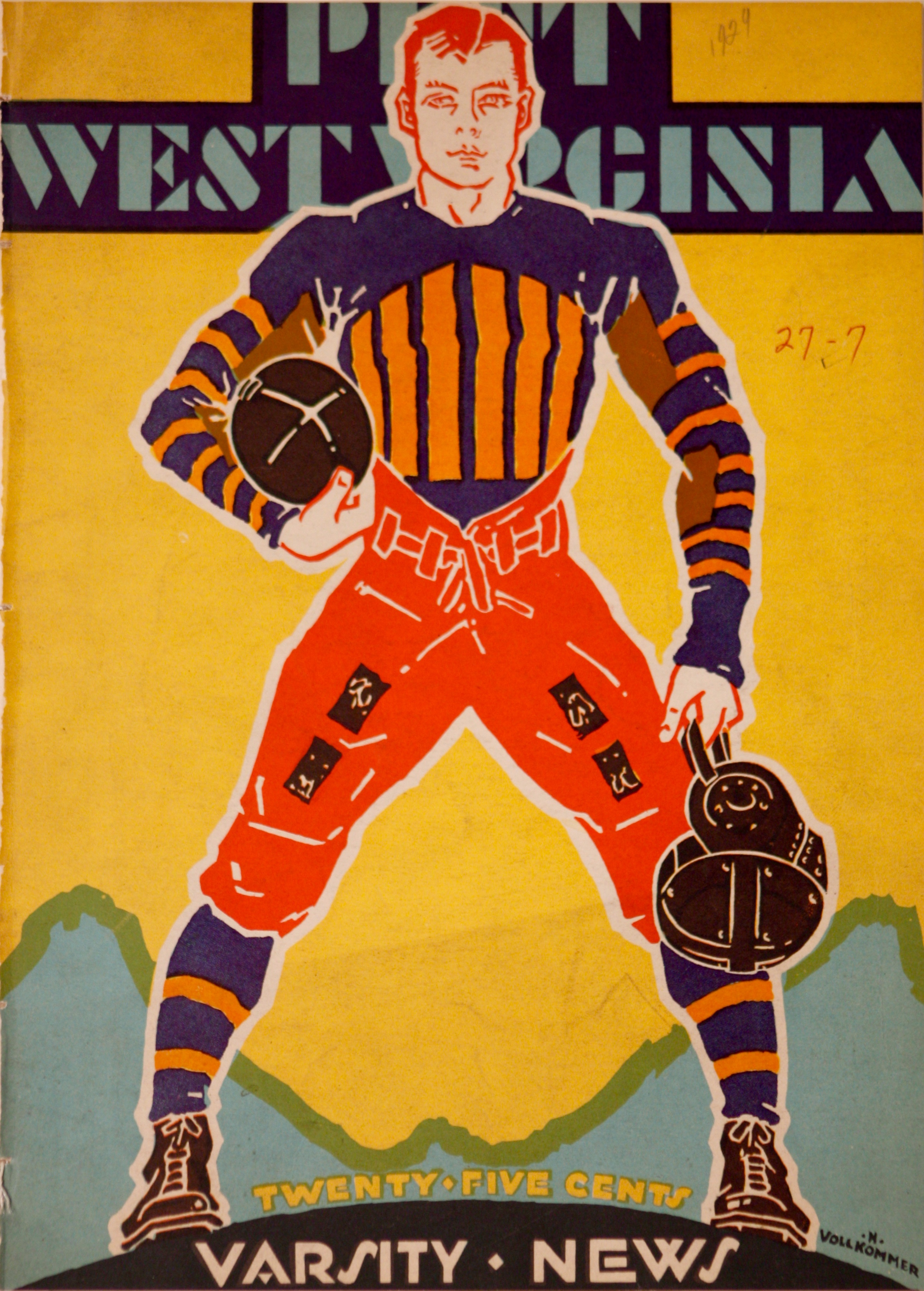
Program for the October 12, 1929 Pitt vs. West Virginia game

The 25th game against the Mountaineers of West Virginia was the first "feature" game of the season at the stadium. Fifth year coach Ira Rodgers' eleven was 1–1–1 after winning their opener against West Virginia Wesleyan 16–0, losing to Davis & Elkins 13–6 and then tying Duquesne 7–7. The Panthers lost to the Mounties last year but still lead the series 15–8–1.

The Pittsburgh Press reported: "The Panther players are determined...Their defeat last year rankled as few beatings have. They frankly want revenge and a team in that frame of mind is dangerous." The Panthers were healthy and Coach Sutherland started the same eleven that beat Duke.

The Panthers gained their revenge for the 9–6 loss in 1928 by beating the Mountaineers 27 to 7. The Panthers would go on to win 19 of the next 20 games played in the series.

On Pitt's third possession, Josh Williams culminated a fifty-nine yard drive with a 17 yard scamper through tackle for a touchdown. Parkinson added the point after and Pitt led 7 to 0 at the end of the first quarter. The second period saw the Panther offense advance the ball to the West Virginia 4-yard line before losing the ball on downs. The Mountaineers punted out of trouble. The Panthers lost possession on a fumble. Pitt's Paul Collins then intercepted an Eddie Stumpp pass to regain possession for Pitt on their 49-yard line. Three running plays advanced the ball to the Mountaineer 17-yard line. On fourth down Eddie Baker's pass was caught by Toby Uansa on the 2 and he fell over the goal line for the touchdown. Uansa added the point and Pitt led 14 to 0 at halftime.

Pitt received the second half kickoff and drove 72 yards for their third touchdown with Uansa going around left end for the last 13 yards for the score. Parkinson missed the placement and Pitt led 20 to 0. The Mountaineers answered with a 43-yard touchdown pass from Stumpp to Bill Behnke. Glenn converted the point after and the score read 20 to 7. After an exchange of possessions Uansa fumbled and West Virginia recovered on their 45-yard line. On third down Uansa intercepted Stumpp's pass and raced 60 yards for the final score of the contest. Parkinson added the point after and Pitt led 27 to 7. The final quarter was a punting duel with many substitutes playing for both sides.

The Mountaineers finished the season with a 4–3–3 record.

The Pitt starting lineup for the West Virginia game was Joe Donchess (left end), Charles Tully (left tackle), Ray Montgomery (left guard), Ralph Daugherty (center), Albert DiMeolo (right guard), James MacMurdo (right tackle), Paul Collins (right end), Edward Baker (quarterback), Toby Uansa (left halfback), Josh Williams (right halfback) and Tom Parkinson (fullback). Substitutes appearing in the game for Pitt were William Walinchus, James Clark, James Rooney, Charles Edwards, William Loehr, Hart Morris, Walter Milligan, Vladimar Babic, Jesse Quatse, Edward Hirschberg, Markley Barnes, Frank Hood, Harry Wagner, Robert Morris, Joe Tommins, Edward Schultz, Ernest Lewis, Al Ciper and Leo Murphy.

=== At Nebraska ===
Week 4: Pitt at Nebraska

Team	1	2	3	4	Total
• Pitt	0	12	0	0	12
Nebraska	0	0	0	7	7

- Date: October 19, 1929
- Location: Memorial Stadium
  Lincoln, NE
- Game start: 2:00 p.m.
- Game attendance: 35,000
- Game weather: soggy field
- Referee: Leslie Edmonds (Ottawa)

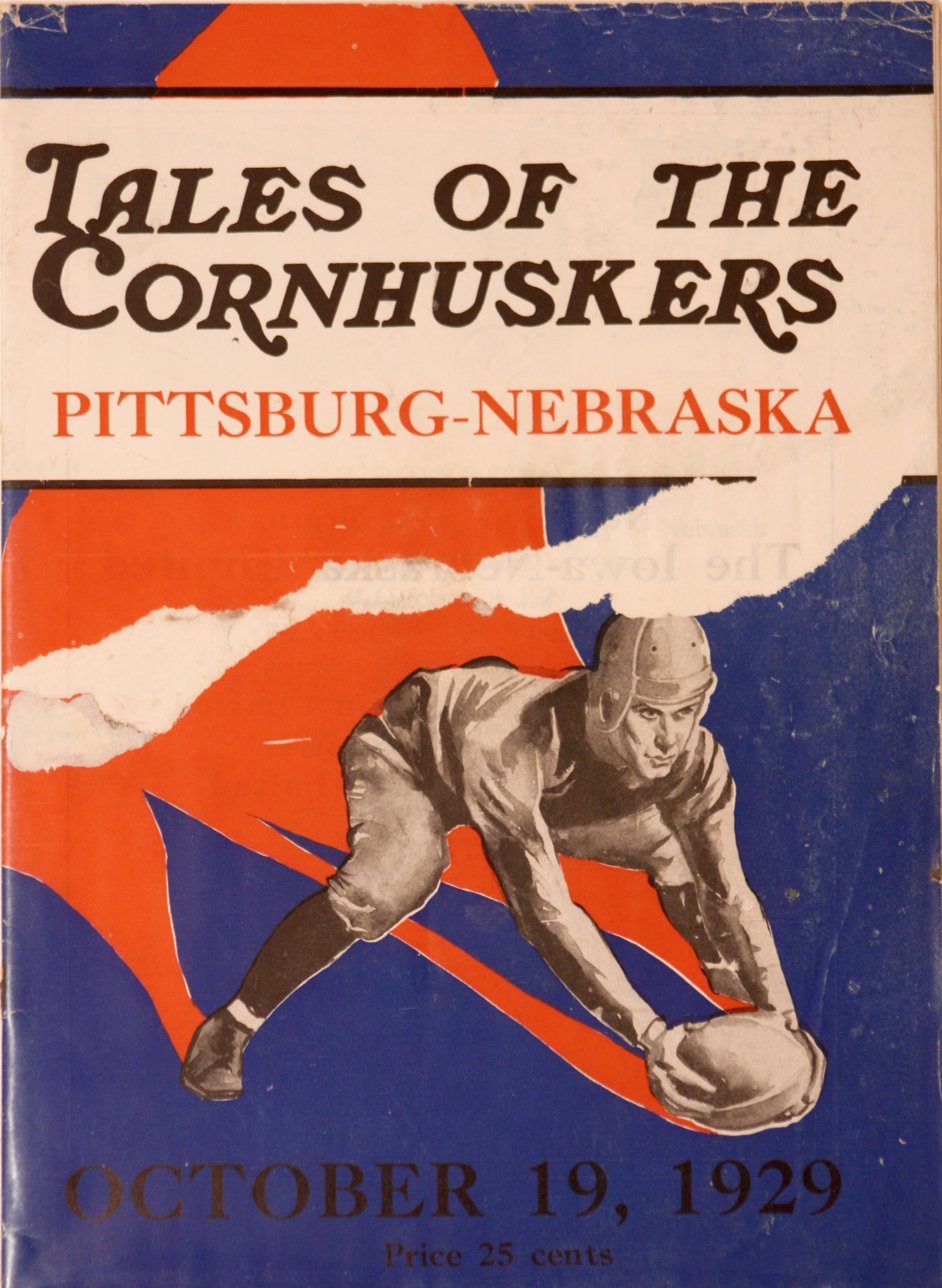
Program for October 19, 1929 Nebraska vs. Pitt game

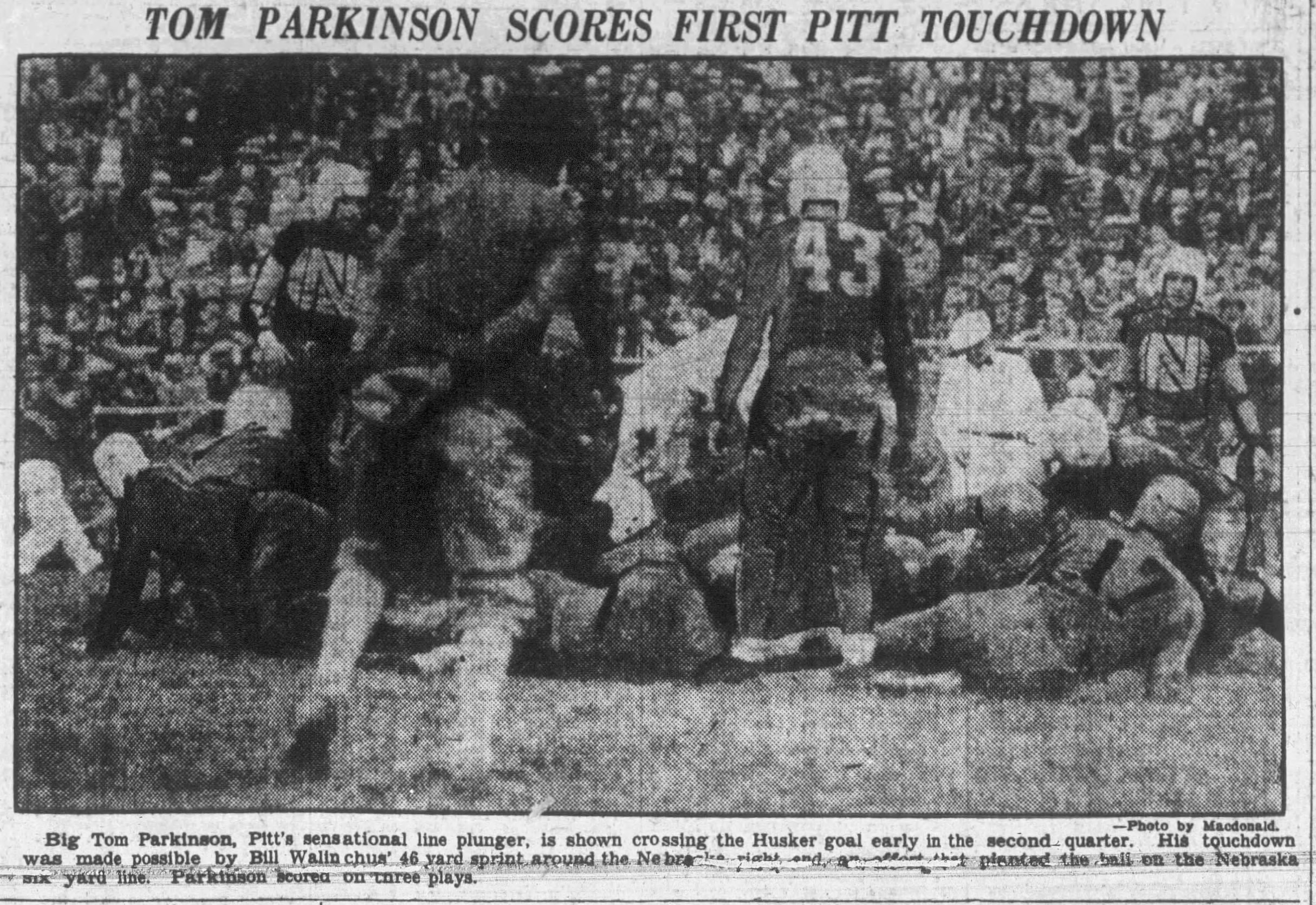
Tom Parkinson scores first touchdown for Pitt

The trainload of Panthers, for their second road game, headed west to battle the Cornhuskers of Nebraska. This was the fourth meeting between the two schools, with the series record 1–1–1. Similar to the 1928 trip, the Panthers left Wednesday evening and arrived in Chicago on Thursday morning. The team practiced on Stagg Field at the University of Chicago. They reboarded the train in the evening and arrived in Omaha on Friday morning. The Ak-Sar-Ben fairgrounds in Omaha was the site of their final scrimmage. Saturday morning the team rode the final 60 miles to Lincoln. The Panthers were healthy and Coach Sutherland started the same lineup he used against West Virginia.

Dana X. Bible replaced Ernest Bearg as Nebraska coach. He had the Huskers 1–0–1 on the season. Nebraska opened at home with a scoreless tie against SMU. They then traveled to Syracuse and beat the Orange 13 to 6. The Huskers lineup boasted an All-American tackle – Ray Richards, and five more members of the 1929 All-Big 6 Conference team. Richards and fullback Clair Sloan were named to the first team and end Steve Hokuf, guard George Koster, halfback George Farley, and tackle Marion Broadstone were named to the second team. David Finoli pointed out that "with home-field advantage and the fact that they had revenge on their minds themselves as they had not beaten Pitt in the past two campaigns, Nebraska certainly had all the intangibles on their side." Notre Dame coach Knute Rockne disagreed, writing in his weekly column: "Pittsburgh has possibly one of the best teams in the East this year, if not in the country, and they will carry too many guns for Coach Bible's men. Nebraska showed nice improvement last week at Syracuse, but they are not ready yet for a team of the caliber that 'Jock' Sutherland will send on to the field this Saturday afternoon."

The Panthers prevailed with a 12 to 7 victory. The first quarter was scoreless, but the Panther offense scored twice in the second stanza to take a 12 to 0 lead into halftime. Halfback William Walinchus caught a short pass from Edward Baker and raced 60 yards to the Nebraska 6-yard line. Tom Parkinson plunged into the end zone on third down for the first touchdown. The second touchdown came on Pitt's next possession and was aided by a 15 yard penalty which took the ball from the Husker 24-yard line to the 9-yard line. Parkinson shoved it across on fourth down and Pitt was done scoring for the day. Parkinson missed both placements. After a scoreless third quarter, the home team blocked a Parkinson punt and recovered the ball on the Pitt 25-yard line. On third down Clair Sloan hit Cliff Morgan with a touchdown pass. Sloan added the point after and the final score read: Pitt 12, Nebraska 7.

Coach Bible told The Lincoln Star: "When the season started I expressed the hope that in the event we lost a game the defeat would be sustained at the hands of a good football team. I do not hesitate to admit that we lost today to that sort of team." The Cornhuskers finished the season with a 4–1–3 record and won the Big Six Conference title.

The Pitt starting lineup for the game against Nebraska was Joe Donchess (left end), Charles Tully (left tackle), Ray Montgomery (left guard), Ralph Daugherty (center), Albert DiMeolo (right guard), James MacMurdo (right tackle), Paul Collins (right end), Edward Baker (quarterback), Toby Uansa (left halfback), Josh Williams (right halfback) and Tom Parkinson (fullback). Substitutes appearing in the game for Pitt were William Walinchus, Vladimar Babic, William Loehr, Charles Edwards, Hart Morris, James Rooney, Frank Hood and Harry Wagner.

=== At Allegheny ===
Week 5: Pitt at Allegheny

Team	1	2	3	4	Total
• Pitt	14	13	13	0	40
Allegheny	0	0	0	0	0

- Date: October 26, 1929
- Location: Municipal Stadium
  Erie, PA
- Game start: 2:00 p.m.
- Game attendance: 8,000
- Game weather: clear
- Referee: C. K. Rebele (Penn State)

On October 26, while Carnegie Tech was hosting Notre Dame at Pitt Stadium, the Pitt Panthers and Allegheny Methodists met for the final time on the gridiron at Municipal Stadium in Erie, Pa. This was the third and final road game for the Panthers. In addition to the game, the Erie – Allegheny Alumni Association and the Erie branch of the University of Pittsburgh arranged a fun-filled day for both fans and students.

Pitt led the all-time series 7–2. Allegheny won two straight games from Western University Pittsburgh back in 1901 and 1902, but the Panthers won the last six and outscored the Methodists 262 to 14.

First year coach Harry Crum's Methodists were 0–2–1 on the season. They tied Geneva (13–13) in their home-field opener, and then lost to Westminster (7–6) before traveling to Dartmouth and losing (53–0).

Coach Sutherland started the second string to keep the regulars healthy for the final four game stretch of Ohio State, Wash. & Jeff., Carnegie Tech and Penn State. The Campus (student newspaper of Allegheny College) reported that three of their starters did not play and six other regulars were injured and missed playing time, so it turned into a game of opportunity for substitutes. The Panthers were too strong and beat the Methodists 40 to 0. James Rooney led the way with three rushing touchdowns and four extra point conversions. William Walinchus, James Clark and Leo Murphy each added a touchdown. Allegheny threatened in the first quarter as they advanced to the Pitt 10-yard line. Walter Milligan intercepted a pass to thwart the drive. The Methodists drove to the Pitt 7-yard line in the waning moments of the game but the Pitt defense held on downs. Allegheny finished the season with a 2-4-2 record.

The Pitt starting lineup for the game against Allegheny was William Loehr (left end), Jesse Quatse (left tackle), Walter Milligan (left guard), Markley Barnes (center), Hart Morris (right guard), Vladimar Babic (right tackle), Paul Collins (right end), Charles Edwards (quarterback), James Rooney (left halfback), William Walinchus (right halfback) and James Clark (fullback). Substitutes appearing in the game for Pitt were Ernest Lewis, Edward Hirschberg, Leo Murphy, Felix Wilps, Al Ciper, Tom Parkinson, Joe Donchess, Charles Tully, Albert DiMeolo and Toby Uansa.

While the country was reeling from the stock market frenzy, the sports topic highlighted this week in history was the Carnegie Foundation report on college athletics. David Finoli noted: "The unique thing about the report was the lack of specifics or the facts that at several universities like Pitt, there were no investigators reported on campus. Regardless of the inadequacies, it brought to light the issues of paying athletes in college football and began a national debate on the ethics of the policy, a policy that would be uncovered at the University of Pittsburgh toward the end of the next decade and would eventually lead to the downfall of their powerful national championship program."

=== Ohio State ===
Week 6: Ohio State at Pitt

Team	1	2	3	4	Total
Ohio State	0	2	0	0	2
• Pitt	8	3	0	7	18

- Date: November 2, 1929
- Location: Pitt Stadium
  Pittsburgh, PA
- Game start: 2:00 p.m.
- Game attendance: 51,000
- Game weather: rain
- Referee: D. W. Very (Penn State)

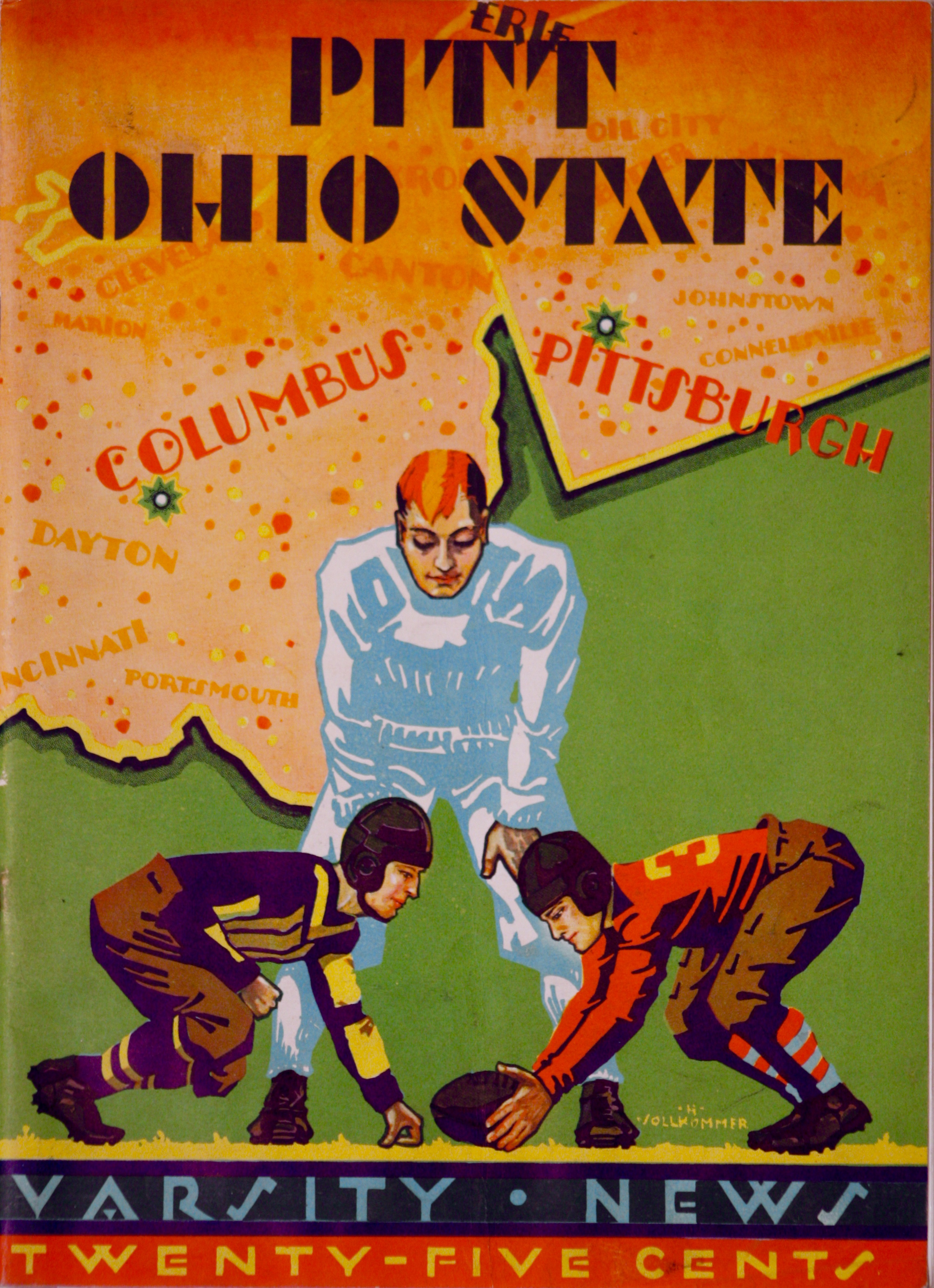
Program for November 2, 1929 Pitt vs. Ohio State game

On November 2 Pitt faced its first opponent from the Western Conference (Big Ten), as the undefeated Ohio State Buckeyes visited Pitt Stadium for the Homecoming Game. First-year coach Sam Willaman's Buckeyes were 3–0–1 on the season. The Buckeye line was anchored by All-American end Wesley Fesler, who would later coach the Panthers for the 1946 season, and All-Big 10 guard Sam T. Selby, while All-Big 10 quarterback Alan M. Holman was the star of the backfield.

The Panthers kept their winning streak intact with an 18 to 2 victory. Ohio State received the opening kick-off, but the Pitt defense forced a punt and gained possession on their 30-yard line. On second down Toby Uansa ran around left end 68 yards for the first touchdown. Tom Parkinson missed the point after and Pitt led 6 to 0. Late in the quarter the Buckeye halfback Arden McConnell mishandled a snap from center and had to fall on the ball in the end zone for a safety. Pitt led 8 to 0 at the break. Pitt fumbled into the end zone in the second stanza and Uansa covered it for a safety and two points for Ohio State. James Rooney converted a 22-yard field goal on Pitt's next possession and Pitt led 11–2 at halftime. The third period was scoreless as the State defense stopped Parkinson inches short of the goal line after the Panthers had recovered a fumble on the State 2-yard line. Pitt had possession on the Buckeye 25-yard line at the end of the third quarter. On the first play after the break, Rooney faked a punt and threw a pass to Uansa on the 13-yard line. He carried it into the end zone for Pitt's last touchdown of the game. Rooney converted the point after. Ohio State finished the season with a 4–3–1 record.

Coach Sutherland praised the Buckeyes: "No Pitt team ever got more breaks than mine did today. Ohio was never favored by fortune. The real feature to my mind was the splendid sportsmanship exhibited by the players of both teams. So far as I was able to see, it was one of the cleanest games I have ever witnessed, despite the fact that both teams were fighting hard. The score does not indicate a thing. We are not 16 points better than Ohio State."

The Pittsburgh Press noted: "Ohio State may have lost the football game, but so far as regular visitors to the stadium are concerned, their band won the world's championship yesterday. The Buckeye musicians are without a doubt the finest college band ever to have appeared in Pittsburgh. The visit of this superb 110-piece organization to Pittsburgh will not be forgotten soon."

The Pitt starting lineup for the game against Ohio State was Joe Donchess (left end), Charles Tully (left tackle), Ray Montgomery (left guard), Ralph Daugherty (center), Albert DiMeolo (right guard), James MacMurdo (right tackle), Paul Collins (right end), Edward baker (quarterback), Toby Uansa (left halfback), Josh Williams (right halfback) and Tom Parkinson (fullback). Substitutes appearing in the game for Pittsburgh were James Rooney, William Loehr, Jesse Quatse, Charles Edwards, Leo Murphy, Hart Morris, James Clark, Vladimar Babic, Harry Wagner and Edward Hirschberg.

=== Washington & Jefferson ===
Week 7: Washington & Jefferson at Pitt

Team	1	2	3	4	Total
Washington & Jefferson	0	0	0	0	0
• Pitt	7	0	7	7	21

- Date: November 9, 1929
- Location: Pitt Stadium
  Pittsburgh, PA
- Game start: 2:00 p.m.
- Game attendance: 30,000
- Game weather: perfect
- Referee: William G. Crowell (Swarthmore)

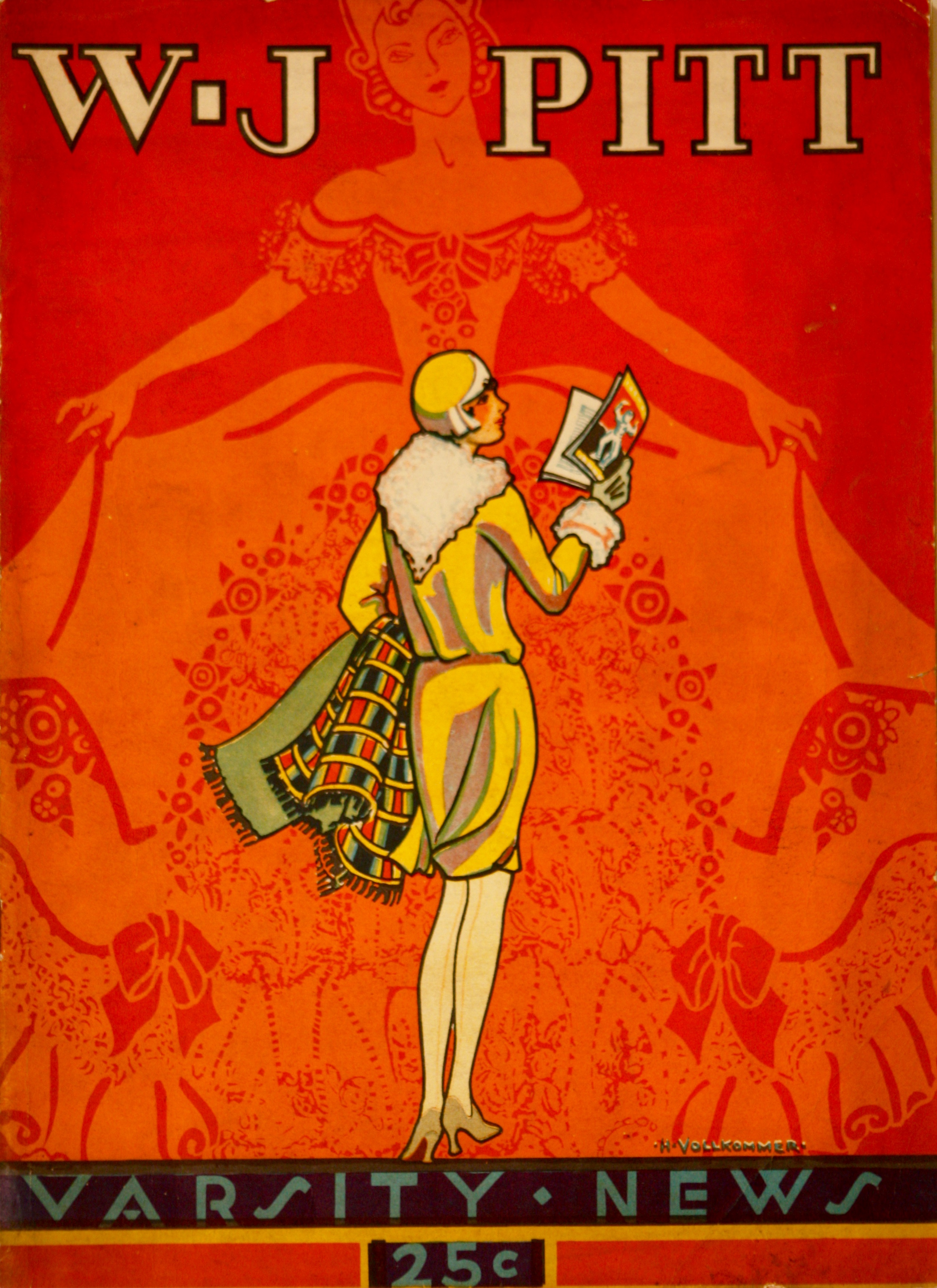
Program for November 9, 1929 Pitt vs. W. & J. game

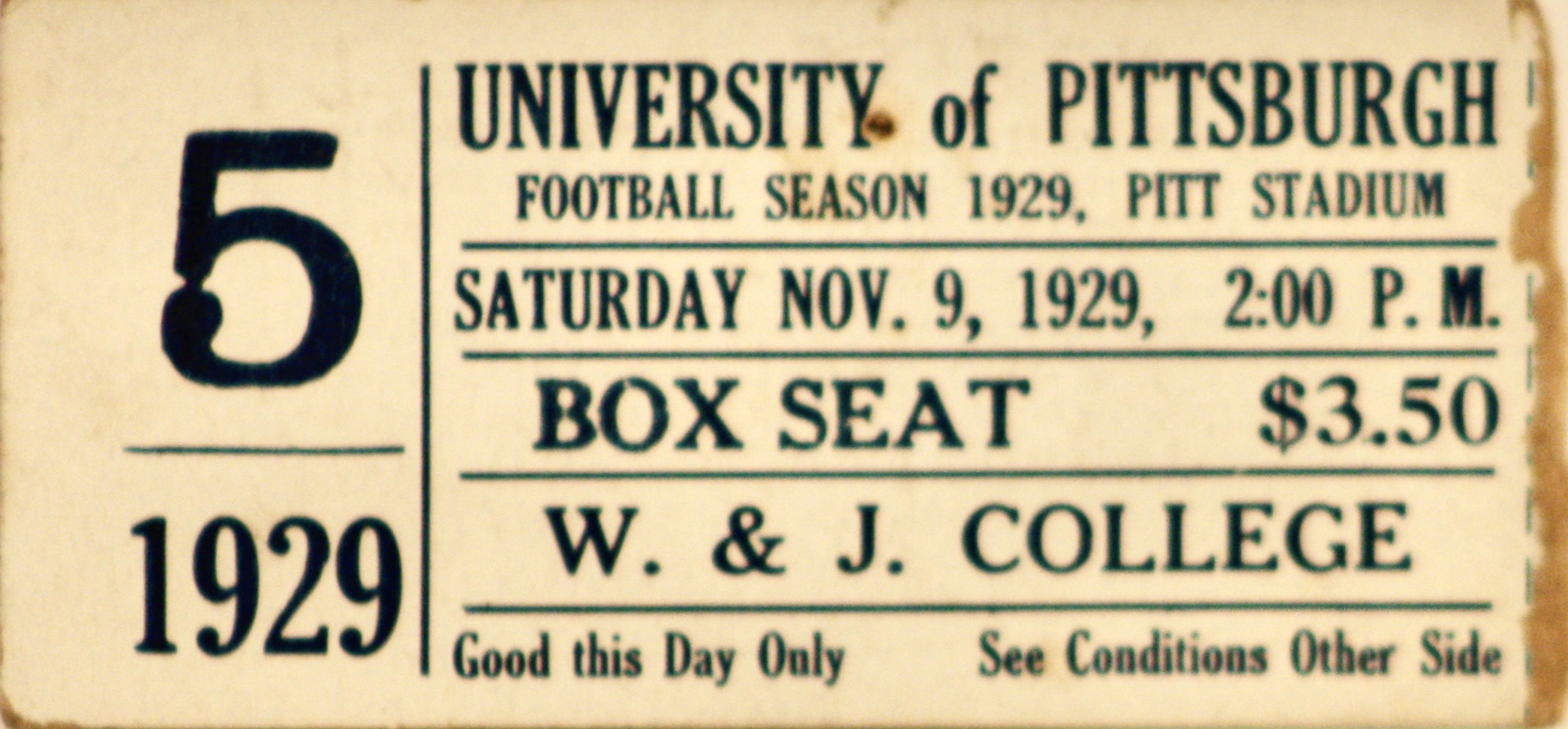
Ticket Stub for November 9, 1929 Pitt vs. W. & J. game

On November 9, 1929, the Pitt Panthers, holding a slim 14–13–2 margin in the all-time series, welcomed their fiercest rival to this point in their football history, the Presidents of Washington & Jefferson, to Pitt Stadium for their annual tussle. The Presidents led by dual coaches, Ray A. Ride and Bill Amos, were undefeated with a 4–0–2 record. Their only blemishes were scoreless ties with Temple and Carnegie Tech. The Presidents had outscored their opponents 124–6. Star tackle Forrest Douds was a three-time All-American, who would become the first coach of the football Pirates (Steelers) in 1933.

Coach Sutherland warned against overconfidence: "Newspapers all over the country have greatly overrated the Panther club and have left a more or less cocksuredness air among the players, the attitude that victory is an established fact. Such an attitude may not work out so well in the remaining three games."

The Panthers obeyed their coach and shut out the Presidents 21 to 0 to keep their quest for a national title on track. The teams traded fumbles early in the opening period. On the Panthers opening possession, Tom Parkinson fumbled on the W. & J. 48-yard line. Two plays later W. & J. halfback Don Lewis fumbled and Charles Tully recovered for the Panthers on their 31-yard line. The Panthers advanced the ball to the Presidents 13-yard line and lost the ball on downs. On W. & J.'s second down Lewis fumbled again and Tully recovered on the Presidents 24-yard line. Toby Uansa gained 5 yards and Parkinson followed with a run to the 1-foot line. Parkinson fumbled on first down, but recovered on the 4-yard line. On third down he plunged into the end zone for the touchdown. Parkinson added the point after and Pitt led 7 to 0. The rest of the half was scoreless as both defenses stiffened. Pitt's third possession of the second half started on their 39-yard line. On third down a 38 yard pass play from James Rooney to Eddie Baker took the ball to the W. & J. 23-yard line. Uansa carried the ball the final 12 yards for the touchdown. Parkinson added the placement for a 14 to 0 Pitt lead at the end of the third stanza. Early in the last period, Pitt gained possession on their 24-yard line. "Uansa got around left end, was apparently stopped on the Pitt 38, but was not in the grasp of a tackler, so he got up and ran to the W. & J. 20." Coach Sutherland then replaced the entire backfield. William Walinchus scored the final touchdown of the contest from two yards out and Charles Edwards added the point after to make it 21 to 0.

The Presidents finished the season with a 5–2–2 record and would not meet the Panthers on the gridiron again until the 1933 season.

The Pitt starting lineup for the game against Washington & Jefferson was Joe Donchess (left end), Charles Tully (left tackle), Ray Montgomery (left guard), Ralph Daugherty (center), Albert DiMeolo (right guard), James MacMurdo (right tackle), Paul Collins (right end), Edward Baker (quarterback), Toby Uansa (left halfback), Josh Williams (right halfback) and Tom Parkinson (fullback). Substitutes appearing in the game for Pitt were James Rooney, William Loehr, Jesse Quatse, Hart Morris, Leo Murphy, William Walinchus, James Clark, Charles Edwards, Walter Milligan, Vladimar Babic, Markley Barnes, Frank Hood, Joe Tommins, Harry Wagner, Edward Schultz, Felix Wilps and Robert Morris.

=== Carnegie Tech ===
Week 8: Carnegie Tech at Pitt

Team	1	2	3	4	Total
Carnegie Tech	0	0	0	13	13
• Pitt	21	6	0	7	34

- Date: November 16, 1929
- Location: Pitt Stadium
  Pittsburgh, PA
- Game start: 2:00 p.m.
- Game attendance: 54,000
- Game weather: sunny
- Referee: Edward Thorpe (De LaSalle)

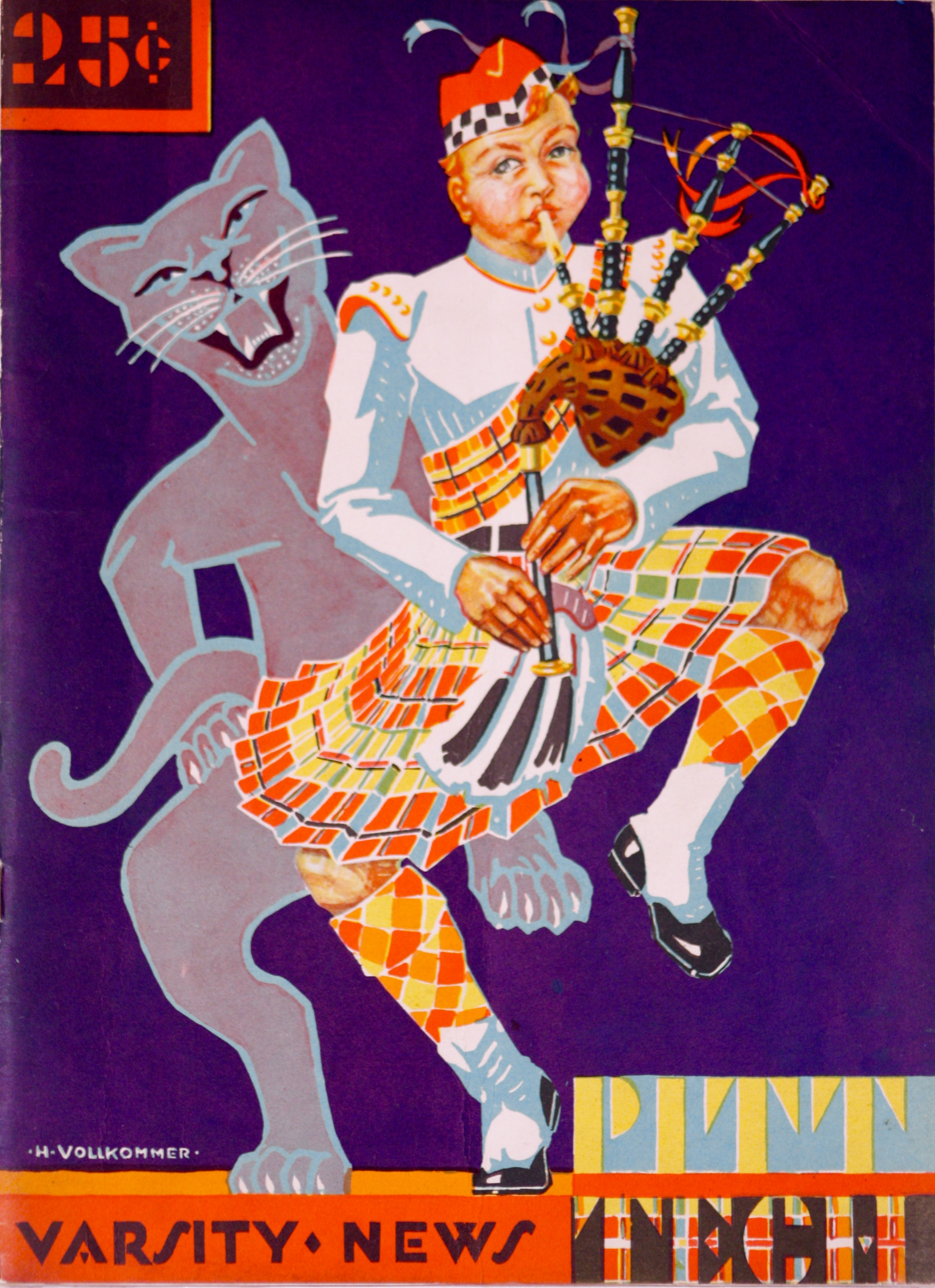
Program for November 16, 1929 Pitt vs. Carnegie Tech game

On November 16, 54,000 spectators flocked to Pitt Stadium for the sixteenth edition of the "City Game". Pitt led the overall series with Carnegie Tech 11–4, but the Tartans had won four of the past six, including the previous year's 6 to 0 battle in the mud. Eighth-year coach Walter Steffen had his team 4–1–1 on the season. The only missteps were a 7–0 loss to Notre Dame and a scoreless tie with Washington & Jefferson. Coach Steffen told the Post-Gazette: "Carnegie Tech is going up against a powerful team, one of the most powerful in the country, but we're going to be in there giving our best. The game should be a good one, and may the best team win."

Coach Sutherland was worried: "Carnegie Tech has a greatly under-rated team. Two weeks of rest have done Tech a lot of good. The Tartans will be 50 per cent stronger today than they were against Notre Dame three weeks ago. I expect the hardest game, by far, of the year."

The Panthers shocked the Tartans and the crowd by scoring 21 points in the opening quarter. Toby Uansa rambled 58 yards on the second play from scrimmage for a touchdown. Tom Parkinson booted the point after for an early 7 to 0 Pitt lead. The Panther defense forced a punt. The center snap went over the punter Harry McCurdy's head. He retrieved the ball, but his punt attempt was blocked by Albert DiMeolo. The ball went through the end zone for a safety and Pitt led 9 to 0. The Panthers then advanced the ball to the Tartan 24-yard line, but lost possession on downs. Uansa intercepted Howard Eyth's pass on the Pitt 25-yard line. The Pitt ground game advanced the ball to the Tech 41-yard line. Uansa broke free through left tackle and scored his second touchdown of the period. Parkinson missed the placement and Pitt led 15 to 0. Joe Donchess intercepted Eyth's pass on the Tech 16-yard line. The Panthers lost the ball on downs at the 12. Tech fullback John Karcis fumbled on second down. William Walinchus caught the fumble in the air and raced 14 yards into the end zone for the Panthers third touchdown in the first fifteen minutes. James Rooney was wide on the placement and Pitt led 21 to 0 at the break. Walinchus scored his second touchdown after a sustained drive in the second stanza. Pitt led 27 to 0 at halftime. The Panther offense spent the third quarter in Tech territory, but could not add to their lead. Early in the final quarter Tech got on the scoreboard with a touchdown on a short drive aided by a poor center snap by Pitt in punt formation. Thayer Flanagan caught a short pass for the score. The placement was blocked. Pitt then sustained another long drive with James Clark plunging over center for the score. Edward Baker added the point after and Pitt led 34 to 6. Tech added a late score on an 80-yard touchdown pass play from McCurdy to John Kerr. John Dreshar added the point after to close the scoring for the game. Pitt 34 to Tech 13.

Carnegie Tech finished the season with a 5–3–1 record.

The Pitt starting lineup for the game against Carnegie Tech was Joe Donchess (left end), Charles Tully (left tackle), Ray Montgomery (left guard), Ralph Daugherty (center), Albert DiMeolo(right guard), James MacMurdo (right tackle), Paul Collins (right end), Edward baker (quarterback), Toby Uansa (left halfback), William Walinchus (right halfback) and Tom Parkinson (fullback). Substitutes appearing in the game for Pitt were James Rooney, James Clark, Leo Murphy, Jesse Quatse, Ed Hirschberg, Hart Morris, Vladimar Babic, Walter Milligan, William Loehr, Charles Edwards and Harry Wagner.

=== Penn State ===
Week 9: Penn State at Pitt

Team	1	2	3	4	Total
Penn State	0	7	0	0	7
• Pitt	6	0	7	7	20

- Date: November 28, 1929
- Location: Pitt Stadium
  Pittsburgh, PA
- Game start: 2:00 p.m.
- Game attendance: 30,000
- Game weather: cold
- Referee: Edward Thorpe (De LaSalle)

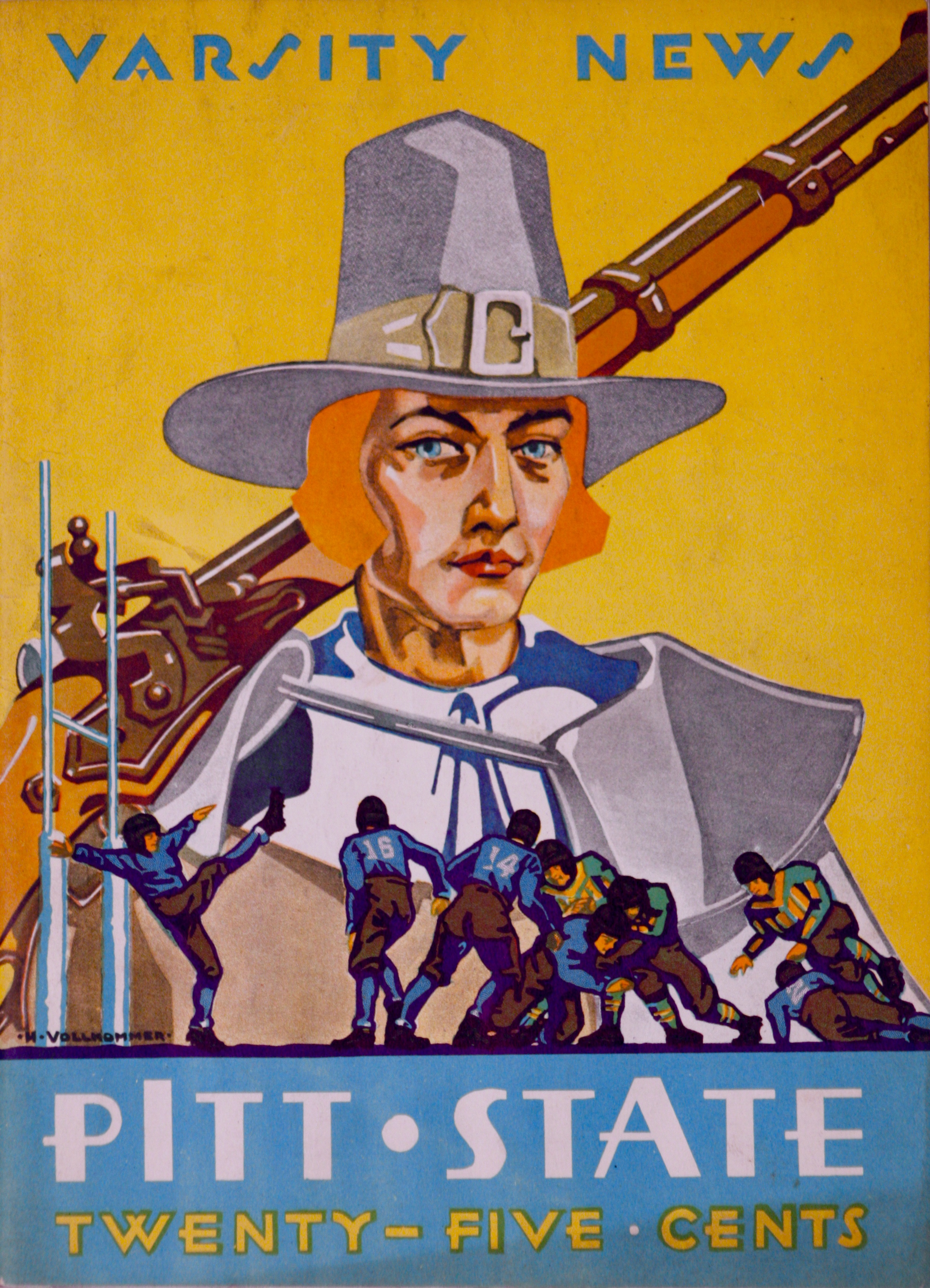
Program for November 28, 1929 Pitt vs. Penn State game

The annual Thanksgiving Day battle with Penn State would determine Pitt's football fate in their drive for a national title and Rose Bowl invitation. Hugo Bezdek was in his twelfth and final year as coach of the Lions. The Nittanies had a 6–2 record, having lost to NYU (7–0) and Bucknell (27–6). The Panthers led the all-time series 17–12–2. Penn State had not beaten Pitt since 1919.

The Pittsburgh Sun-Telegraph noted: "Exactly 20 November games in all have been played by the Panthers under their present mentor, and of these they have won 16, tied 3 and lost one. The lone defeat was administered by the Presidents (W. & J.) in 1924."

Ten Panthers made their last appearance at the stadium in a Pitt uniform on Thanksgiving Day: Tom Parkinson, Toby Uansa, Joe Donchess, Ray Montgomery, Albert DiMeolo, Charles Edwards, Al Corson, Markley Barnes, James Rooney and Felix Wilps. Coach Sutherland made two changes to the lineup. Halfback Josh Williams' injured knee did not respond to treatment, so he was replaced by William Walinchus and Ed Hirschberg replaced Paul Collins at end.

The Pitt Panthers completed their undefeated regular season by beating the Nittany Lions 20 to 7. The Penn State defense was geared to stop Toby Uansa, so Tom Parkinson rushed for 182 yards and scored all 20 points for the Panthers. Pitt scored first after a 65 yard sustained drive with Parkinson plunging over from the one. His point after attempt was wide. Pitt led 6 to 0 at the end of the first quarter. Late in the second period the Penn State offense started a drive from their 47-yard line. After reaching the Pitt 26-yard line, the Panthers called time out to regroup, but nonetheless State quarterback Cooper French threw a touchdown pass to end Skip Stahley tying the game. Yutz Diedrich booted the point after. The ball hit the upright and bounced over the cross-bar. Pitt trailed for the first time all season. Halftime score: Penn State 7 to Pitt 6. Mid-third quarter, the Panther offense started on their 16-yard line and went 84 yards on 16 plays for the touchdown. Parkinson carried the ball on 11 plays, including the last 3 yards for the touchdown. His point after was successful and Pitt led 13 to 7 at the end of the third period. The Panther offense regained possession on their 47-yard line early in the fourth stanza, and minutes later Parkinson scored his final touchdown of the day and added the placement.

The Pitt starting lineup for the game against Penn State was Joe Donchess (left end), Charles Tully (left tackle), Ray Montgomery (left guard), Ralph Daugherty (center), Albert DiMeolo (right guard), James MacMurdo (right tackle), Ed Hirschberg (right end), Edward Baker (quarterback), Toby Uansa (left halfback), William Walinchus (right halfback) and Tom Parkinson (fullback). Substitutes appearing in the game for Pitt were Paul Collins and Jesse Quatse.

Penn State finished the season with a 6–3 record. Hugo Bezdek, with an over-all 12-year record of 65–30–11, had a 1–9–2 record versus the Panthers. He was replaced by his assistant Bob Higgins.

Pitt was invited to play a post-season benefit game for the Christmas Fund against Fordham or Colgate in New York City. The University Athletic Council turned down the offer in hopes that an invitation to the Rose Bowl would be forthcoming after the Penn State game.

On December 4, the San Francisco Junior Chamber of Commerce invited the Panthers to play the undefeated St. Mary's Gaels at Kezar Stadium on December 21. The Tournament of Roses committee chose USC for the Rose Bowl host team, so St. Mary's extended the offer to Pitt with the enticements of more money and cooler weather. The Panther Athletic Council declined the offer because the team would miss more than a week of classes.

=== vs USC (Rose Bowl) ===
Week 10: Pitt at USC

Team	1	2	3	4	Total
Pitt	0	0	7	7	14
• USC	13	13	14	7	47

- Date: January 1, 1930
- Location: Rose Bowl
  Pasadena, CA
- Game start: 2:15 p.m.
- Game attendance: 71,000
- Game weather: warm
- Referee: William D. Crowell (Swarthmore)

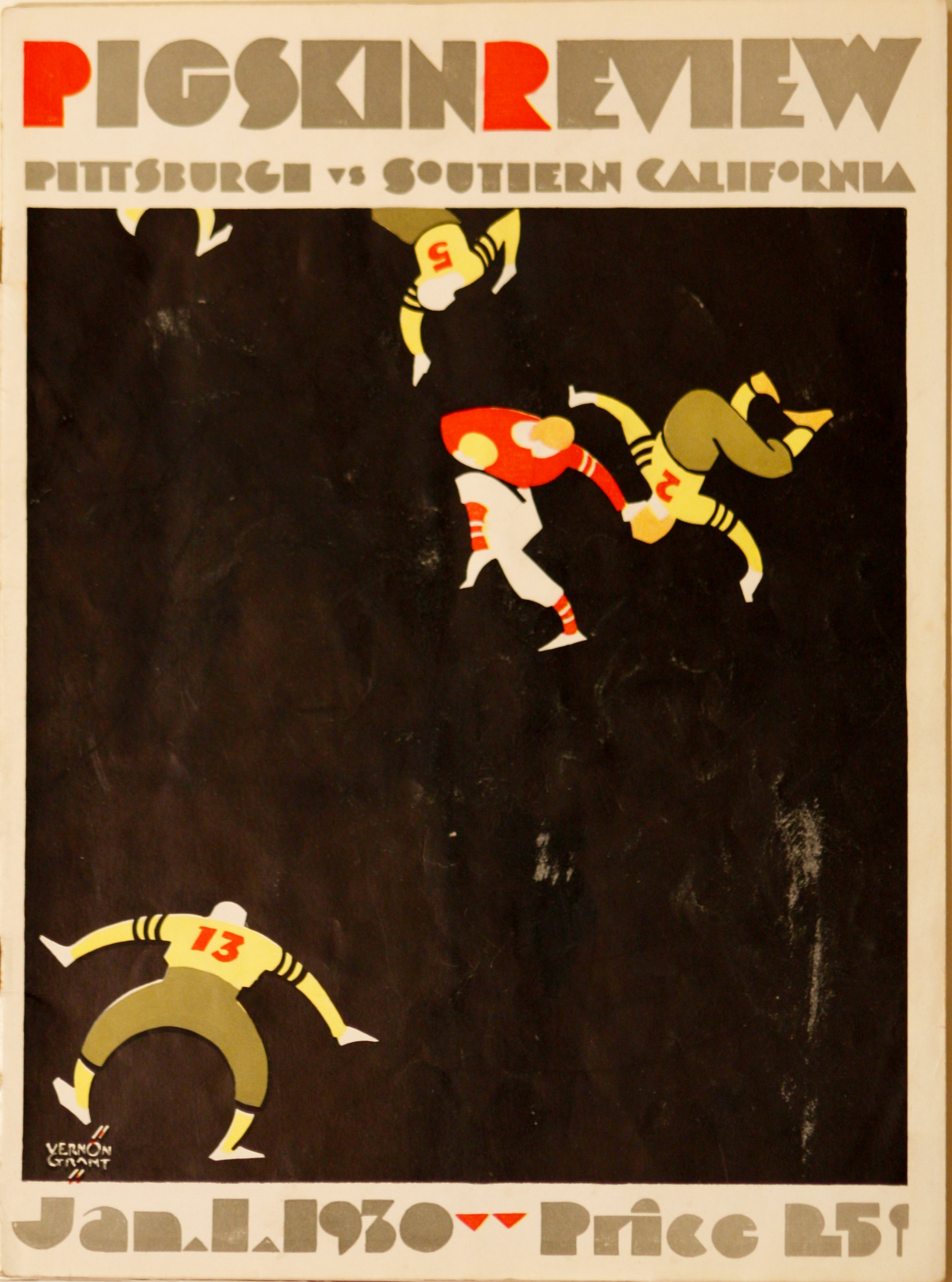
The Official 1930 Rose Bowl program

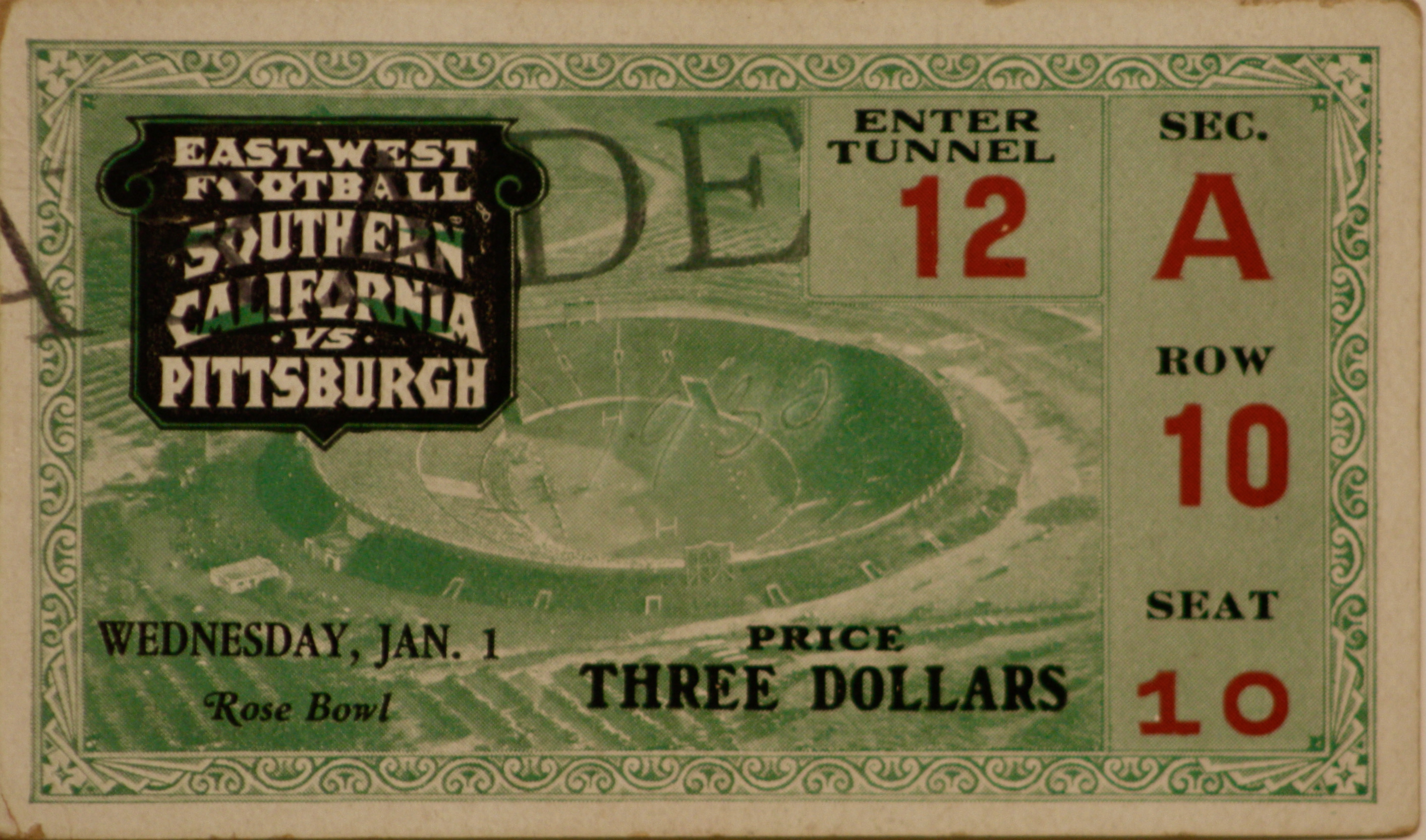
Ticket Stub for 1930 Rose Bowl game

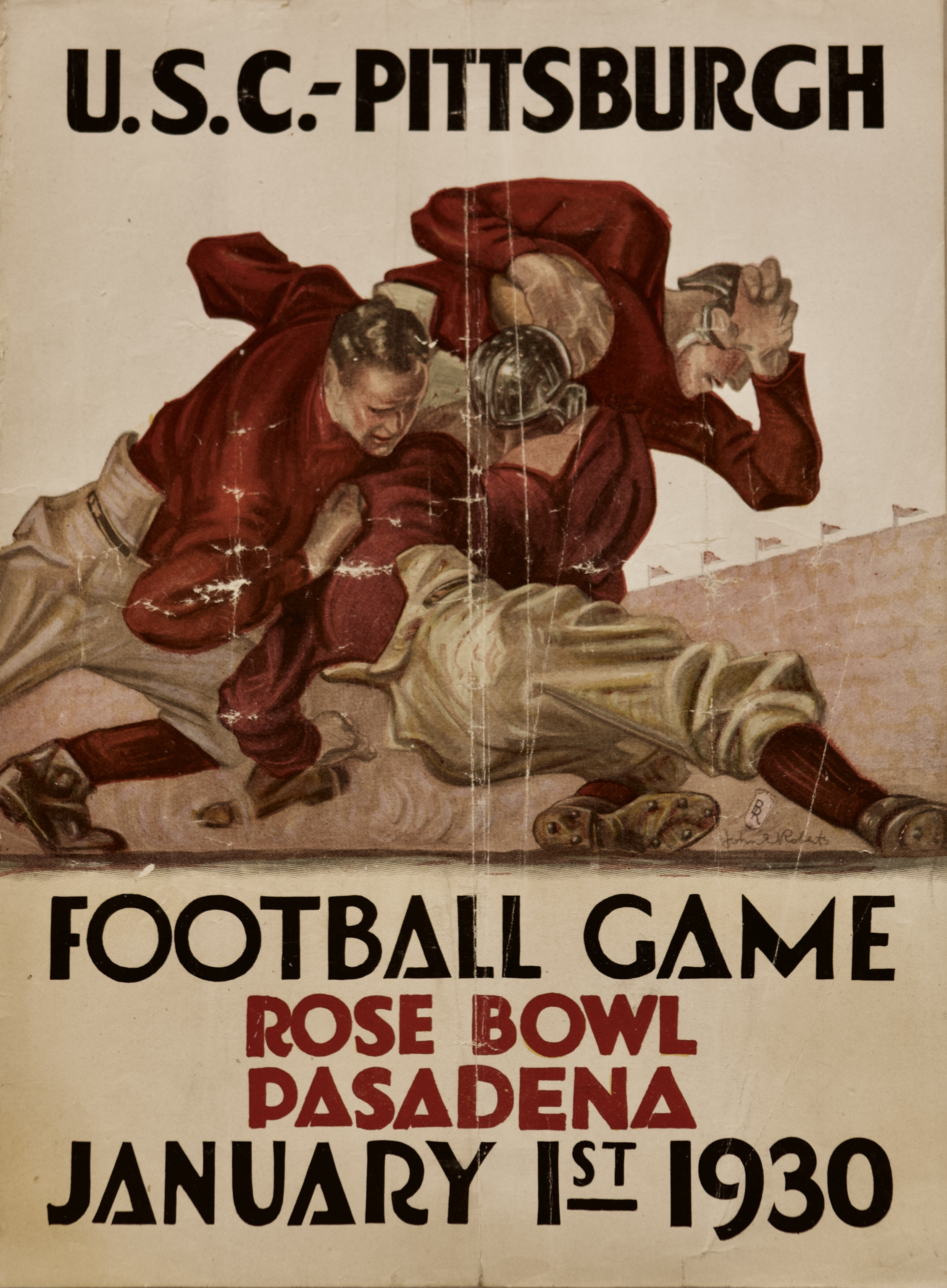
"Outlaw" 1930 Rose Bowl program

On December 6, "Dr. H. E. Friesell, dean of the Pitt school of dentistry, and chairman of the Panther athletic schedule committee, was officially notified by long-distance telephone yesterday afternoon that Pitt had been selected by Southern California to represent the East in the Tournament of Roses battle." The Panthers accepted and Ralph Davis of The Pittsburgh Press wrote: "A defeat by the Trojans would be a humiliating blow to the Panther prestige. (Howard) Jones' boys by no stretch of the imagination, can be figured as a championship eleven. They have been beaten twice."

Hours before the Panther entourage boarded the train headed west, C. L. Woolridge, chairman of the athletic council, announced that Jock Sutherland would be retained as coach of the Panthers for the next five years. Woolridge stated: "The council had renewed the contract with Dr. Sutherland not only because it considers him one of the foremost coaches of the country, but also because it has a deep appreciation of his widespread influences in teaching good sportsmanship and clean living."

The second Rose Bowl trip under Jock Sutherland's leadership took a southwestern route so the team could become better accustomed to the heat of southern California. The Panther train departed Christmas night for St. Louis, where the team was unable to practice the following morning on the muddy Washington University field. Dallas, Texas was the next stop, with a practice session under ideal weather conditions on the field of Southern Methodist University. On December 28 the train arrived in El Paso, Texas where the team had a short workout on the high school field before boarding the train for Tucson, Arizona and a day of rest at the Santa Rita Hotel. The Pittsburgh Panthers arrived in Pasadena on the evening of December 30 and stayed at the Hotel Huntington. "The squad will do no sight-seeing going to the coast, nor will it see the celebrations before the game. Sutherland will give the boys no opportunity to have their minds distracted from football."

The USC Trojans led by fifth year coach Howard Jones came into the game with a 9–2 record. Their two losses were at home against the California Bears (15–7) and at Chicago against Notre Dame (13–12). End Francis Tappaan was named first-team All-America by the United Press, the Newspaper Enterprise Association, the North American Newspaper Alliance and the All-American Board of Football. Captain and guard Nate Barragar was named second team All-America by the International News Service, the Central Press Association and Davis Walsh. Quarterback Russ Saunders garnered third team accolades from the Newspaper Enterprise Association and the North American Newspaper Alliance.

The Pasadena Post reported: 'With a wealth of reserve material and perfect mental attitude in the minds of players Coach Howard Jones felt confident that his charges would weather the test against the undefeated champions of the east."

Jock Sutherland told the San Francisco Examiner: "My men are apparently in good condition - no colds, no injuries – and they will be ready for a real fight. Just say the weather will have no effect whatever on the outcome."

The Pasadena Star-News New Year's Number noted: "The University of Southern California scored the most overwhelming victory in the history of the Tournament of Roses East-West football game, at the Rose Bowl the afternoon of January 1, 1930, when it defeated the University of Pittsburgh, 47 to 14."

Pitt received the opening kick-off. On the first play from scrimmage Toby Uansa sprinted around left end for a 68 yard gain to the USC 14-yard line where they lost the ball on downs. The Trojan offense controlled the rest of the first half, scoring four touchdowns and two extra points to lead 26 to 0 at halftime. Trojan quarterback Russ Saunders threw a 55-yard touchdown pass to halfback Harry Edelson to open the scoring. Gaius Shaver was good on the point after. Saunders then connected on a 25 yard scoring pass to halfback Ernest Pinckert. Shaver missed the placement. End of first period: USC 13 to Pitt 0. Then the Trojans recovered a Pitt fumble on the Panther 18. Marshall Duffield replaced Saunders at quarterback and scored on a three yard end run. The placement bounced off the upright. The Trojans ended the first half with a 1 yard touchdown plunge by Duffield and the conversion by John Baker. Halftime score: USC 26 to Pitt 0. Saunders returned to his quarterback position to start the third period and raced 15 yards for a touchdown. Shaver tacked on the point to make the score 33 to 0. The Panthers proceeded to sustain a drive and Uansa threw a 28 yard touchdown pass to William Walinchus to put the Panthers on the board. Tom Parkinson was good on the placement. The Panther defense could not stop the Trojans, as Saunders threw a 38 yard scoring toss to Edelson. Baker added the point to make the score USC 40 to Pitt 7. Pitt back Charles Edwards intercepted a Duffield pass and ran back to the USC 36-yard line. Josh Williams connected with end Paul Collins on a 36 yard touchdown pass. Parkinson added the point to make it USC 40 to Pitt 14. Duffield answered with a 62 yard scoring pass to Thomas Wilcox and drop-kicked the point after to finalize the game's scoring.

Statistically, the Panthers out gained the Trojans on the ground, but USC was dominant through the air. Southern Cal gained 454 total yards to 285 for the Panthers. USC completed 8 of 16 passes for 287 yards. Pitt completed 4 of 19 passes for 87 yards. USC gained 167 yards rushing to 199 for the Panthers. USC earned 14 first downs and Pitt 10.

Coach Sutherland praised the Trojans to The Los Angeles Times: "U.S.C. has come ahead, we have gone back since Thanksgiving Day. The Trojans played beautiful football, we fell down. I have seen few teams function better than U.S.C. did against us. My team's defense against Howard Jones's passing attack simply went to pieces."

The Pitt starting lineup for the game against USC was Joe Donchess (left end), Charles Tully (left tackle), Ray Montgomery (left guard), Ralph Daugherty (center), Albert DiMeolo (right guard), James MacMurdo (right tackle), Paul Collins (right end), Edward Baker (quarterback), Toby Uansa (left halfback), William Walinchus (right halfback) and Tom Parkinson (fullback). Substitutes appearing in the game for Pitt were Jesse Quatse, Hart Morris, Ed Hirschberg, James Clark, Charles Edwards, Josh Williams, Vladimar Babic, Leo Murphy, William Loehr, Walter Milligan, James Rooney, Markley Barnes, Ernest Lewis and Harry Wagner.

The Panthers spent January 2 and 3 sightseeing in southern California, and then boarded the train for the trip home. The itinerary included stops at the Grand Canyon, where they met Charles Lindbergh, and the Indian ruins near Santa Fe, New Mexico. The Santa Fe visit was scratched so the University could save $1,200, and the players could get back for classes. The Panthers arrived back in Pittsburgh on January 8. They were greeted by a crowd of 3,500, which included students, fans, the Pitt band and Chancellor John G. Bowman.

== Scoring summary ==
1929 Pittsburgh Panthers scoring summary
Player	Touchdowns	Extra points	Field goals	Safety	Points
Toby Uansa	11	1	0	0	67
Tom Parkinson	8	13	0	0	61
William Walinchus	8	0	0	0	48
James Rooney	5	7	1	0	40
Harold “Josh” Williams	4	0	0	0	24
James Clark	2	0	0	0	12
Joe Donchess	1	0	0	0	6
Leo Murphy	1	0	0	0	6
Edward Schultz	1	0	0	0	6
Fred Johnson	1	0	0	0	6
Paul Collins	1	0	0	0	6
Edward Baker	0	2	0	0	2
Charles Edwards	0	1	0	0	1
team	0	0	0	3	6
Totals	43	24	1	3	291

== Postseason ==
On January 29 at the annual football banquet, coach Sutherland named Edward Baker captain for the 1930 season, and W. D. Harrison, director of athletics, awarded letters to the following players: Albert DiMeolo, Edward Baker, Joe Donchess, Charles Tully, Ray Montgomery, Ralph Daugherty, James MacMurdo, Paul Collins, Charles Edwards, Toby Uansa, Harold Williams, Tom Parkinson, Jesse Quatse, Markley Barnes, Hart Morris, Edward Hirschberg, James Rooney, William Walinchus, James Clark and Manager Joe Bower.

On February 1 the Veteran Athletes of Philadelphia awarded the Panthers the Joseph H. Jolley Trophy emblematic of the Eastern football champions.

The Panther department of athletics named Walter A. Kearney student manager of the 1930 varsity football team. Mr. Kearney was a dental student and had been an assistant manager the past three seasons.

Author David Finoli in his book When Pitt Ruled The Gridiron wrote this assessment of the Pitt 1929 season after the bowl loss: "Any argument that Pittsburgh was a better team than Notre Dame much less Southern Cal became a moot point after this annihilation, the worst defeat by any school in Rose Bowl history to that point. Luckily, in the historical context, the experts of the day did not consider bowl games anything more than an exhibition (sic), so Parke H. Davis did not consider the embarrassing effort when naming the Panthers 1929 national champions."

== All-Americans ==
- **Joe Donchess**, end (College Football Hall of Fame inductee) (1st team Associated Press, based on a nationwide opinion poll of 215 experts, including "newspaper sports editors and writers, Associated Press staff observers, officials and coaches in every section of the country."; 1st team United Press, "named by the United Press with the assistance and advice of more than 200 coaches, officials and experts from every part of the country"; 1st team Collier's Weekly as selected by Grantland Rice; 1st team Newspaper Enterprise Association selected as follows: "In the selection of these All-America players, the opinions of more than 100 coaches and football writers have been confidentially consulted."; 1st team International News Service (later merged with UP to form UPI), based on "popular vote among sport writers and coaches, representing every major section of the country"; voters included Damon Runyon, Ford C. Frick, Tom Thorp, Dick Hylund, John Heisman, and Bill Corum; 1st team North American Newspaper Alliance, selected by four noted coaches, Dan McGugin, Howard Jones, Bob Zuppke, and Bill Roper; 1st team New York Sun; 1st team New York Post; 1st team All-America Board of Football, consisting of Knute Rockne, "Pop" Warner, Tad Jones and W.A. Alexander; 1st team Davis Walsh for the International News Service; 1st team Lawrence Perry:"Lawrence Perry selected his 1929 All-America football team after traveling many thousands of miles and watching most of the country's leading teams in play or practice"; Washington Times)
- **Ray Montgomery**, guard (2nd team AP; 1st team United Press; 1st team Collier's Weekly; 1st team Newspaper Enterprise Association; 1st team International News Service; 2nd team North American Newspaper Alliance; 2nd team New York Sun; 1st team All-America Board of Football; 1st team Davis Walsh)
- Luby DiMeolo, guard (3rd team International News Service [t]; 2nd team New York Post)
- Octavius "Toby" Uansa, halfback (1st team AP-1; 3rd team United Press; 2nd team Newspaper Enterprise Association; 2nd team International News Service; 3rd team North American Newspaper Alliance; 1st team Central Press Association, "selected by the readers of hundreds of client newspapers of the Central Press Association"; Washington Times)
- Thomas "Pug" Parkinson, fullback (2nd team AP; 2nd team United Press; 1st team International News Service; 2nd team North American Newspaper Alliance; 1st team New York Sun; 2nd team New York Post; 2nd team Davis Walsh [hb]; 1st team Lawrence Perry; Washington Times)
- **Bold** – Consensus All-American
