= 1929 Missouri Tigers football team =

American college football season

1929 Missouri Tigers football
- Conference: Big Six Conference
- Record: 5–2–1 (3–1–1 Big 6)
- Head coach: Gwinn Henry (7th season)
- Captain: John D. Waldorf
- Home stadium: Memorial Stadium

1929 Big Six Conference football standings
	Conf.					Overall
Team	W		L		T	W		L		T
No. 7 Nebraska $	3	–	0	–	2	4	–	1	–	3
Missouri	3	–	1	–	1	5	–	2	–	1
Kansas State	3	–	2	–	0	3	–	5	–	0
Oklahoma	2	–	2	–	1	3	–	3	–	2
Kansas	2	–	3	–	0	4	–	4	–	0
Iowa State	0	–	5	–	0	1	–	7	–	0
$ – Conference champion; Rankings from Dickinson System

The 1929 Missouri Tigers football team was an American football team that represented the University of Missouri in the Big Six Conference (Big 6) during the 1929 college football season. The team compiled a 5–2–1 record (3–1–1 against Big 6 opponents), finished in second place in the Big 6, and outscored opponents by a total of 78 to 28. Gwinn Henry was the head coach for the seventh of nine seasons. The team played its home games at Memorial Stadium in Columbia, Missouri.

The team's leading scorer was Russell Dills with 26 points.

== Schedule ==
Date	Time	Opponent	Site	Result	Attendance	Source
October 12		at Iowa State	State Field; Ames, IA (rivalry)	W 19–0	4,011	
October 19		Drake*	Memorial Stadium; Columbia, MO	W 20–0	12,000	
October 26		Nebraska	Memorial Stadium; Columbia, MO (rivalry)	T 7–7	22,000	
November 2		Kansas State	Memorial Stadium; Columbia, MO	L 6–7		
November 9	2:00 p.m.	at Washington University*	Francis Field; St. Louis, MO	W 6–0	9,000	
November 16		at NYU*	Yankee Stadium; Bronx, NY	L 0–14	40,000	
November 23		at Kansas	Memorial Stadium; Lawrence, KS (rivalry)	W 7–0		
November 28		Oklahoma	Memorial Stadium; Columbia, MO (rivalry)	W 13–0		
*Non-conference game; All times are in Central time
