= 1929 Nebraska Cornhuskers football team =

American college football season

1929 Nebraska Cornhuskers football
- Program for 1929 homecoming game

Big 6 champion
- Conference: Big Six Conference
- Record: 4–1–3 (3–0–2 Big 6)
- Head coach: Dana X. Bible (1st season)
- Captain: George M. Farley
- Home stadium: Memorial Stadium

1929 Big Six Conference football standings
	Conf.					Overall
Team	W		L		T	W		L		T
No. 7 Nebraska $	3	–	0	–	2	4	–	1	–	3
Missouri	3	–	1	–	1	5	–	2	–	1
Kansas State	3	–	2	–	0	3	–	5	–	0
Oklahoma	2	–	2	–	1	3	–	3	–	2
Kansas	2	–	3	–	0	4	–	4	–	0
Iowa State	0	–	5	–	0	1	–	7	–	0
$ – Conference champion; Rankings from Dickinson System

The 1929 Nebraska Cornhuskers football team was an American football team that represented the University of Nebraska as a member of the Big Six Conference during the 1929 college football season. In its first season under head coach Dana X. Bible, the team compiled a 4–1–3 record (3–0–2 against conference opponents), won the Big Six championship, and outscored opponents by a total of 93 to 62. The team played its home games at Memorial Stadium in Lincoln, Nebraska.

== Before the season ==
New Nebraska head coach Bible arrived after having served eleven years as head football coach at Texas A&M University and winning six Southwest Conference titles along the way. The 1929 Cornhusker squad was fresh off winning the 1928 conference title in the first season of the Big 6, but had to quickly learn the new system brought in by Bible with a tough set of games scheduled to open the season.

== Schedule ==
Date	Time	Opponent	Site	Result	Attendance	Source
October 5	2:00 p.m.	SMU*	Memorial Stadium; Lincoln, NE	T 0–0		
October 12	1:30 p.m.	at Syracuse*	Archbold Stadium; Syracuse, NY	W 13–6	20,000	
October 19	2:00 p.m.	Pittsburgh*	Memorial Stadium; Lincoln, NE	L 7–12	35,000	
October 26	2:00 p.m.	at Missouri	Memorial Stadium; Columbia, MO (rivalry)	T 7–7	22,000	
November 2	2:00 p.m.	Kansas^{†}	Memorial Stadium; Lincoln, NE (rivalry)	W 12–6		
November 16	2:00 p.m.	Oklahoma	Memorial Stadium; Lincoln, NE (rivalry)	T 13–13		
November 23	2:00 p.m.	at Kansas State	Memorial Stadium; Manhattan, KS (rivalry)	W 10–6		
November 28	2:00 p.m.	Iowa State	Memorial Stadium; Lincoln, NE (rivalry)	W 31–12	11,149	
*Non-conference game; ^{†}Homecoming; All times are in Central time

== Roster ==
Adam, JerryG; Bauer, Harvey #12 C Broadstone, Marion #54 T Burgeson, Gaylord #15 G Bushee, Charles #25 E Byrnes, Charles E Eno, Gordon #58 T Farley, George #21 HB; Fisher, Morris #16 E Frahm, Harold #26 HB; Gilbert, James #52 G Greenberg, Elmer #46 G Hokuf, Stephen #30 E Hubka, Elmer #31 G Hunt, Bob E Jeffries, Ralph #30 G Jenkins, Rollin T Justice, Charles #48 G Koster, George #36 G Kroger, Roscoe #49 T Lehmkuhl, Walter #37 T Lewandowski, Adolph #18 E Long, Andrew #32 HB; Maasdam, Felber #24 C	Marquis, Bernard #39 HB; Marrow, Wallace #29 QB; McBride, Clark #13 HB; Milne, James #40 E Morgan, Clifford #17 E Morrison, Paul #41 C Nelson, Clarence #20 HB; Packer, Berne #10 FB; Paul, Marvin #43 HB; Peaker, Harold #27 QB; Perry, Art #42 HB; Petersen, Ardean #44 T Prucka, Frank #14 E Ray, George #53 T Rhea, Hugh #50 C Richards, Raymond #34 T Rowley, Claude HB; Scherzinger, Victor #22 FB; Sloan, Clair #35 FB; Still, Joe #51 E Urban, Willard #33 E Witte, Willard #19 QB; Young, Robert #11 HB

== Coaching staff ==
Name	Title	First year in this position	Years at Nebraska	Alma mater
Dana X. Bible	Head Coach	1929	1929–1936	Carson-Newman
Bill Day	Centers Coach	1928	1921–1925, 1928–1931	Nebraska
Ed Weir		1929	1926, 1929–1937, 1943	Nebraska
Charlie T. Black	Backfield Coach	1926	1926–1930	
Bunny Oakes	Line Coach	1926	1926–1930	
R. G. Lehman		1928	1928–1931	

== Game summaries ==
=== SMU ===
SMU at Nebraska

Team	1	2	3	4	Total
SMU	0	0	0	0	0
Nebraska	0	0	0	0	0

- Date: October 5
- Location: Memorial Stadium • Lincoln, Nebraska

The 1929 season started with a tall challenge for the Nebraska squad, as they were still installing the new style of play brought in by coach Bible, and faced the reigning Southwest Conference champion Southern Methodist team as their first test. Many injuries were suffered on the field, including the loss of one Cornhusker player for the year, but the two championship teams were well-matched and ultimately fought to a scoreless draw in their first ever meeting.

=== Syracuse ===
Nebraska at Syracuse

Team	1	2	Total
• Nebraska			13
Syracuse			6

- Date: October 12
- Location: Archbold Stadium • Syracuse, New York

Without much time to recover from the battle against SMU, Nebraska traveled to meet Syracuse for the season's first eastern game. Syracuse was favored to win and seemed to have the edge due to the number of hobbled Cornhusker players, and by the end of the first half those predictions seemed to be coming true as the squads left the field with the Orangemen holding a 6–0 lead. In the second half, however, Nebraska's adjustments were able to successfully shut down further Syracuse scoring, and the Cornhuskers found a way to score 13 of their own to secure the upset win, making this the third straight Nebraska win over Syracuse and moving the Cornhuskers ahead in the series to 4–3.

=== Pittsburgh ===
Pittsburgh at Nebraska

Team	1	2	3	4	Total
• Pittsburgh	0	12	0	0	12
Nebraska	0	0	0	7	7

- Date: October 19
- Location: Memorial Stadium • Lincoln, Nebraska
- Game attendance: 35,000

Coming off the upset win over Syracuse, Nebraska entered the second eastern game of the season when Pitt came calling in Lincoln. The contest started slowly as both teams struggled to come up with points, but the Panthers found a way to get in a couple of touchdowns before the half, though both kicks after failed. After that, Pittsburgh was done scoring as the Cornhuskers successfully bottled the Panthers up for the rest of the game. Nebraska was only able to manage a single fourth-quarter touchdown and so failed to take the game, but did hold the Pittsburgh squad to the lowest total points it would score in any game of 1929. The edge in the series went to Pittsburgh, 2–1–1.

=== Missouri ===
Nebraska at Missouri

Team	1	2	3	4	Total
Nebraska	0	0	0	7	7
Missouri	7	0	0	0	7

- Date: October 26
- Location: Memorial Stadium • Columbia, Missouri
- Game attendance: 22,000

Missouri was seeking revenge for the humiliating 0–24 loss in front of a Nebraska homecoming crowd last year, where the Husker-Tiger Bell was taken from their possession after only a few hours and held by the Cornhuskers since then. This time, the game was in Columbia, and it was the Missouri homecoming crowd that the battle would be held in front of. Missouri made the first strike early before both teams settled down into a grind. The Cornhuskers were frustrated at every turn, unable to move the ball, while Missouri repeatedly gashed Nebraska for gains before sputtering out. Finally, with about four minutes left, Nebraska managed to get into the end zone and evened up the score. A last Tiger push for the win fell short, and Missouri was denied the revenge win and possession of the bell. Nebraska remained firmly in control of the series, 15–6–2.

=== Kansas ===
Kansas at Nebraska

Team	1	2	Total
Kansas			6
• Nebraska			12

- Date: November 2
- Location: Memorial Stadium • Lincoln, Nebraska

Kansas had a strong offense, but Nebraska's defense proved up to the challenge. The Jayhawks tried many approaches but were time and again turned away without points, including one series where the Kansas squad started 1st and goal from the Cornhusker 5-yard line and went away empty-handed. Nebraska's win streak over the Jayhawks was now at five games as Kansas slipped to 9–25–2 against the Cornhuskers in the 36 consecutive series games dating back to 1892.

=== Oklahoma ===
Oklahoma at Nebraska

Team	1	2	Total
Oklahoma			13
Nebraska			13

- Date: November 16
- Location: Memorial Stadium • Lincoln, Nebraska

The Cornhuskers were weakened by injuries following the Kansas victory, including the loss of a key backfield runner for the season. The Sooners pulled out first and made Nebraska fight back for the rest of the game. Late in the contest, Nebraska scored the tying touchdown and had an opportunity to take the win with the kick after, but the ball was booted too low and the game's scoring would hold at the 13–13 tie until time expired. This was the first and only time that the Cornhuskers would wind up with three tied games in a single season, and Nebraska retained a 6–1–2 edge over Oklahoma.

=== Kansas State ===
Nebraska at Kansas State

Team	1	2	Total
• Nebraska			10
Kansas State			6

- Date: November 23
- Location: Memorial Stadium • Manhattan, Kansas

Kansas State had a shot at a league title if they could come out in front of Nebraska, and the Aggies came with a strong aerial attack that dazzled the spectators. It was all the Cornhuskers could do to keep up and fight back to try to hold Kansas State off the scoreboard. The Cornhuskers pulled out the win with two safeties, the four points resulting thus deciding the game, which denied the title sought by the Aggies while keeping Nebraska unbeaten on conference play so far for the year. Kansas State once again was held winless against the Cornhuskers, having never come closer than one tied game in their fourteen tries.

=== Iowa State ===
Iowa State at Nebraska

Team	1	2	Total
Iowa State			12
• Nebraska			31

- Date: November 28
- Location: Memorial Stadium • Lincoln, Nebraska
- Game attendance: 11,149

The freezing weather did not slow Nebraska down for the final game of the year, though the start was sluggish enough to keep the event somewhat in doubt until the second half. By the end of the game, the Cornhuskers were rolling and leading by enough that coach Bible played everyone on the roster before the final gun. Iowa State was sent back to Ames in disappointment and lagging in the series 4–19–1.

== After the season ==
Coach Bible, in his first season, installed his new system amidst a challenging schedule, and nonetheless led the Cornhuskers to repeat as Big 6 champions in the conference's second year. The program's overall record now stood at 224–75–23 (.731), while Nebraska's league record slipped slightly to 57–8–7 (.840). The Dickinson System's final national rankings for 1929 placed Nebraska at #7.
