= 1929 Kansas State Wildcats football team =

American college football season

1929 Kansas State Wildcats football
- Conference: Big Six Conference
- Record: 3–5 (3–2 Big 6)
- Head coach: Bo McMillin (2nd season)
- Home stadium: Memorial Stadium

1929 Big Six Conference football standings
	Conf.					Overall
Team	W		L		T	W		L		T
No. 7 Nebraska $	3	–	0	–	2	4	–	1	–	3
Missouri	3	–	1	–	1	5	–	2	–	1
Kansas State	3	–	2	–	0	3	–	5	–	0
Oklahoma	2	–	2	–	1	3	–	3	–	2
Kansas	2	–	3	–	0	4	–	4	–	0
Iowa State	0	–	5	–	0	1	–	7	–	0
$ – Conference champion; Rankings from Dickinson System

The 1929 Kansas State Wildcats football team represented Kansas State University in the 1929 college football season.

== Schedule ==
Date	Opponent	Site	Result	Attendance	Source
October 5	at Purdue*	Ross–Ade Stadium; West Lafayette, IN	L 14–26	9,000	
October 12	vs. Texas A&M*	Fair Park Stadium; Dallas, TX	L 0–19	10,000	
October 19	at Kansas	Memorial Stadium; Lawrence, KS (rivalry)	W 6–0	10,000	
October 26	Oklahoma^{†}	Memorial Stadium; Manhattan, KS	L 13–14	12,000	
November 2	at Missouri	Memorial Stadium; Columbia, MO	W 7–6		
November 9	Iowa State	Memorial Stadium; Manhattan, KS (rivalry)	W 3–2	4,000	
November 23	Nebraska	Memorial Stadium; Manhattan, KS (rivalry)	L 6–10	12,000	
November 28	at Marquette*	Marquette Stadium; Milwaukee, WI	L 6–25		
*Non-conference game; ^{†}Homecoming
