= 1929 Oklahoma Sooners football team =

American college football season

1929 Oklahoma Sooners football
- Conference: Big Six Conference
- Record: 3–3–2 (2–2–1 Big 6)
- Head coach: Adrian Lindsey (3rd season)
- Captain: Frank Crider
- Home stadium: Memorial Stadium

1929 Big Six Conference football standings
	Conf.					Overall
Team	W		L		T	W		L		T
No. 7 Nebraska $	3	–	0	–	2	4	–	1	–	3
Missouri	3	–	1	–	1	5	–	2	–	1
Kansas State	3	–	2	–	0	3	–	5	–	0
Oklahoma	2	–	2	–	1	3	–	3	–	2
Kansas	2	–	3	–	0	4	–	4	–	0
Iowa State	0	–	5	–	0	1	–	7	–	0
$ – Conference champion; Rankings from Dickinson System

The 1929 Oklahoma Sooners football team represented the University of Oklahoma in the 1929 college football season. In their third year under head coach Adrian Lindsey, the Sooners compiled a 3–3–2 record (2–2–1 against conference opponents), finished in fourth place in the Big Six Conference, and matched their opponents in scoring with a combined total of 81 to 81.

No Sooners received All-America honors in 1929, though back Frank Crider received all-conference honors.

== Schedule ==
Date	Opponent	Site	Result	Source
October 12	at Creighton*	Owen Field; Norman, OK	W 26–0	
October 19	vs. Texas*	Fair Park Stadium; Dallas, TX (rivalry)	L 0–21	
October 26	Kansas State	Memorial Stadium; Norman, OK	W 14–13	
November 2	Iowa State	Memorial Stadium; Norman, OK	W 21–7	
November 9	Kansas	Memorial Stadium; Norman, OK	L 0–7	
November 16	at Nebraska	Memorial Stadium; Lincoln, NE (rivalry)	T 13–13	
November 23	Oklahoma A&M*	Memorial Stadium; Norman, OK (Bedlam)	T 7–7	
November 28	at Missouri	Memorial Stadium; Columbia, MO (rivalry)	L 0–13	
*Non-conference game
