= 1899 Nebraska Bugeaters football team =

American college football season

1899 Nebraska Bugeaters football
- Conference: Independent
- Record: 1–7–1
- Head coach: Alonzo Edwin Branch (1st season)
- Home stadium: Antelope Field

1899 Midwestern college football independents records
	Conf.			Overall
Team	W	L	T	W		L		T
Kansas		–		10	–	0	–	0
North Dakota		–		6	–	0	–	0
Detroit College		–		5	–	0	–	0
Lincoln (MO)		–		1	–	0	–	0
Ohio State		–		9	–	0	–	1
Iowa		–		8	–	0	–	1
Washington University		–		5	–	1	–	0
Missouri		–		9	–	2	–	0
Chicago P&S		–		4	–	1	–	0
Mount Union		–		5	–	1	–	1
Indiana		–		6	–	2	–	0
South Dakota Agricultural		–		3	–	1	–	0
Wabash		–		1	–	0	–	1
Cincinnati		–		5	–	2	–	0
Drake		–		5	–	2	–	0
Heidelberg		–		5	–	2	–	0
Buchtel		–		2	–	1	–	0
Doane		–		2	–	1	–	0
Northern Illinois State		–		1	–	0	–	2
Notre Dame		–		6	–	3	–	1
Central Michigan		–		3	–	2	–	0
Fairmount		–		2	–	1	–	2
Carthage		–		3	–	2	–	1
Western Reserve		–		5	–	4	–	0
Wittenberg		–		5	–	4	–	0
Iowa State		–		5	–	4	–	1
College of Emporia		–		1	–	1	–	1
Ohio		–		2	–	2	–	0
Ohio Wesleyan		–		5	–	5	–	0
Haskell		–		4	–	5	–	0
Lake Forest		–		4	–	6	–	2
Rush Medical		–		3	–	4	–	0
Kansas State		–		2	–	3	–	0
Iowa State Normal		–		1	–	3	–	2
Washburn		–		2	–	5	–	2
Butler		–		1	–	3	–	0
Miami (OH)		–		1	–	5	–	0
Nebraska		–		1	–	7	–	1
North Dakota Agricultural		–		0	–	1	–	0
Baldwin–Wallace		–		0	–	4	–	0

The 1899 Nebraska Bugeaters football team represented the University of Nebraska in the 1899 college football season. The team was coached by first-year head coach Alonzo Edwin Branch and played their home games at Antelope Field in Lincoln, Nebraska. They competed as an independent.

Following the departure of Fielding H. Yost following the 1898 season, Nebraska hired Branch, a recent graduate of Williams College with little football coaching experience. In his only season as head coach, Branch led Nebraska to its first losing season, and only sub-.500 record in its first 38 years of football.

This was NU's final season before officially becoming the "Cornhuskers" in 1900.

== Schedule ==
Date	Time	Opponent	Site	Result	Source
September 30		at Lincoln High School	Lincoln, NE	W 6–0 (exhibition)	
October 6		at Iowa State	State Field; Ames, IA (rivalry)	L 0–33	
October 14		Kansas City Medics	Antelope Field; Lincoln, NE	T 6–6	
October 21		Missouri	Antelope Field; Lincoln, NE (rivalry)	L 0–11	
October 28		at Kansas City Medics	Exposition Park; Kansas City, MO	L 0–24	
November 4	3:00 p.m.	vs. Iowa	Ames Avenue Park; Omaha, NE (rivalry)	L 0–30	
November 11		at Drake	Des Moines, IA	W 12–6	
November 18		Kansas	Antelope Field; Lincoln, NE (rivalry)	L 20–36	
November 24		at South Dakota	Vermillion, SD	L 5–6	
November 30	3:30 p.m.	vs. Grinnell	Ames Avenue Park; Omaha, NE	L 0–12	

== Coaching staff ==
Coach	Position	First year	Alma mater
Alonzo Edwin Branch	Head coach	1899	Williams
Jack Best	Trainer	1890	Nebraska
Austin John Collett	Manager	1899	Nebraska

== Roster ==
Bell, Johnny HB
Benedict, Raymond HB
Brew, Fred T
Carver, Fred FB
Cortelyou, Spencer E
Crandall, Harry QB
Dasenbrock, John G
Drain, Ralph QB
Gordon, Anthony FB
Hunter, Fred HB
Kingsbury, Raymond FB
Koehler, John C
Pearse, Arthur RT
Ploughead RG
Reasoner, Ira T
Ringer, John LG
Tukey, Harry QB
Tyson C
Wallace LT
Westover, John LT
Williams, Charles Erwin HB

== Game summaries ==
=== At Lincoln High ===
Nebraska at Lincoln High

Team	1	2	Total
• Nebraska			6
Lincoln High			0

- Date: September 30
- Location: Lincoln, NE

Nebraska met the Lincoln High School football team in a pre-season exhibition game for the second time. It is unclear whether the score was the result of a tightly contested game, or an act of sportsmanship by the university team against high schoolers.

=== At Iowa State ===
Nebraska at Iowa State

Team	1	2	Total
Nebraska	0	0	0
• Iowa State	28	5	33

- Date: October 6
- Location: State Field, Ames, IA

Nebraska suffered its worst-ever defeat to open the 1899 season, trailing 28–0 at halftime and losing 33–0. Iowa State had begun preparation for the football season prior to that start of the school year, a practice not commonplace at the time.

=== Kansas City Medics ===
Kansas City Medics at Nebraska

Team	1	2	Total
Kansas City Medics	0	6	6
Nebraska	0	6	6

- Date: October 14
- Location: Antelope Field, Lincoln, NE

After allowing 33 points to Iowa State the week prior, Nebraska's defense held the Kansas City Medics off the scoreboard in a scoreless first half. A second-half touchdown from each team culminated in a 6–6 tie.

=== Missouri ===
Missouri at Nebraska

Team	1	2	Total
• Missouri			11
Nebraska			0

- Date: October 21
- Location: Antelope Field, Lincoln, NE

Despite a valiant defensive performance, Nebraska's offensive woes continued in an 11–0 loss, the second of five times NU was shut out in 1899.

=== At Kansas City Medics ===
Nebraska at Kansas City Medics

Team	1	2	Total
Nebraska	0	0	0
• KC Medics	12	12	24

- Date: October 28
- Location: Kansas City, MO

After playing to a 6–6 tie weeks earlier, Nebraska could not keep pace with the Kansas City Medics in their second meeting.

=== Iowa ===
Iowa vs. Nebraska

Team	1	2	Total
• Iowa			30
Nebraska			0

- Date: November 4
- Location: Omaha, NE

Nebraska was shut out for the third consecutive week by Iowa in Omaha.

=== At Drake ===
Nebraska at Drake

Team	1	2	Total
• Nebraska	6	6	12
Drake	0	6	6

- Date: November 11
- Location: Des Moines, IA

Nebraska defeated Drake 12–6 in what would be the first and only college football head coaching win for Branch (after a brief stint at Miami (OH), he ended his career with a record of 1–11–1).

=== Kansas ===
Kansas at Nebraska

Team	1	2	Total
• Kansas	24	12	36
Nebraska	5	15	20

- Date: November 18
- Location: Antelope Field, Lincoln, NE

Despite a strong second-half performance against Kansas in Lincoln, Nebraska was unable to overcome a 24–5 deficit. The team's performance was so poor that rumors began to spread suggesting team captain and starting halfback Charles Williams may quit the team.

=== At South Dakota ===
Nebraska at South Dakota

Team	1	2	Total
Nebraska	5	0	5
• South Dakota	0	6	6

- Date: November 24
- Location: Vermillion, SD

Nebraska led 5–0 in its first-ever game against South Dakota, but were unable to capitalize on scoring opportunities in the first half. A second-half touchdown gave South Dakota a 6–5 victory. Team captain Charles Williams left the NU program following the game.

=== Grinnell ===
Grinnell vs. Nebraska

Team	1	2	Total
• Grinnell			12
Nebraska			0

- Date: November 30
- Location: Omaha, NE

Grinnell became the fifth team to shut out Nebraska in 1899, defeating the Bugeaters 12–0 on a muddy, wet afternoon in Omaha.
