= 1899 Ohio State Buckeyes football team =

American college football season

1899 Ohio State Buckeyes football
- Conference: Independent
- Record: 9–0–1
- Head coach: John B. Eckstorm (1st season)
- Home stadium: Ohio Field

1899 Midwestern college football independents records
	Conf.			Overall
Team	W	L	T	W		L		T
Kansas		–		10	–	0	–	0
North Dakota		–		6	–	0	–	0
Detroit College		–		5	–	0	–	0
Lincoln (MO)		–		1	–	0	–	0
Ohio State		–		9	–	0	–	1
Iowa		–		8	–	0	–	1
Washington University		–		5	–	1	–	0
Missouri		–		9	–	2	–	0
Chicago P&S		–		4	–	1	–	0
Mount Union		–		5	–	1	–	1
Indiana		–		6	–	2	–	0
South Dakota Agricultural		–		3	–	1	–	0
Wabash		–		1	–	0	–	1
Cincinnati		–		5	–	2	–	0
Drake		–		5	–	2	–	0
Heidelberg		–		5	–	2	–	0
Buchtel		–		2	–	1	–	0
Doane		–		2	–	1	–	0
Northern Illinois State		–		1	–	0	–	2
Notre Dame		–		6	–	3	–	1
Central Michigan		–		3	–	2	–	0
Fairmount		–		2	–	1	–	2
Carthage		–		3	–	2	–	1
Western Reserve		–		5	–	4	–	0
Wittenberg		–		5	–	4	–	0
Iowa State		–		5	–	4	–	1
College of Emporia		–		1	–	1	–	1
Ohio		–		2	–	2	–	0
Ohio Wesleyan		–		5	–	5	–	0
Haskell		–		4	–	5	–	0
Lake Forest		–		4	–	6	–	2
Rush Medical		–		3	–	4	–	0
Kansas State		–		2	–	3	–	0
Iowa State Normal		–		1	–	3	–	2
Washburn		–		2	–	5	–	2
Butler		–		1	–	3	–	0
Miami (OH)		–		1	–	5	–	0
Nebraska		–		1	–	7	–	1
North Dakota Agricultural		–		0	–	1	–	0
Baldwin–Wallace		–		0	–	4	–	0

The 1899 Ohio State Buckeyes football team represented Ohio State University in the 1899 college football season. They played all their home games at Ohio Field and were coached by John B. Eckstorm. They were the first Buckeyes football team to go undefeated, finishing 9–0–1.

== Schedule ==
Date	Opponent	Site	Result	Attendance	Source
September 30	Otterbein	Ohio Field; Columbus, OH	W 30–0		
October 7	Wittenberg	Ohio Field; Columbus, OH	W 29–0		
October 14	at Case	League Park; Cleveland, OH	T 5–5		
October 21	Ohio	Ohio Field; Columbus, OH	W 41–0		
October 28	at Oberlin	Oberlin, OH	W 6–0		
November 4	Western Reserve	Ohio Field; Columbus, OH	W 6–0		
November 11	Marietta	Ohio Field; Columbus, OH	W 17–0		
November 18	Ohio Medical	Ohio Field; Columbus, OH	W 12–0	4,000	
November 25	at Muskingum	New Concord, OH	W 34–0		
November 30	Kenyon	Ohio Field; Columbus, OH	W 5–0		
