= 1899 Rush Medical football team =

American college football season

1899 Rush Medical College football
- Conference: Independent
- Record: 3–4

1899 Midwestern college football independents records
	Conf.			Overall
Team	W	L	T	W		L		T
Kansas		–		10	–	0	–	0
North Dakota		–		6	–	0	–	0
Detroit College		–		5	–	0	–	0
Lincoln (MO)		–		1	–	0	–	0
Ohio State		–		9	–	0	–	1
Iowa		–		8	–	0	–	1
Washington University		–		5	–	1	–	0
Missouri		–		9	–	2	–	0
Chicago P&S		–		4	–	1	–	0
Mount Union		–		5	–	1	–	1
Indiana		–		6	–	2	–	0
South Dakota Agricultural		–		3	–	1	–	0
Wabash		–		1	–	0	–	1
Cincinnati		–		5	–	2	–	0
Drake		–		5	–	2	–	0
Heidelberg		–		5	–	2	–	0
Buchtel		–		2	–	1	–	0
Doane		–		2	–	1	–	0
Northern Illinois State		–		1	–	0	–	2
Notre Dame		–		6	–	3	–	1
Central Michigan		–		3	–	2	–	0
Fairmount		–		2	–	1	–	2
Carthage		–		3	–	2	–	1
Western Reserve		–		5	–	4	–	0
Wittenberg		–		5	–	4	–	0
Iowa State		–		5	–	4	–	1
College of Emporia		–		1	–	1	–	1
Ohio		–		2	–	2	–	0
Rush Medical		–		3	–	3	–	1
Ohio Wesleyan		–		5	–	5	–	0
Haskell		–		4	–	5	–	0
Lake Forest		–		4	–	6	–	2
Kansas State		–		2	–	3	–	0
Iowa State Normal		–		1	–	3	–	2
Washburn		–		2	–	5	–	2
Butler		–		1	–	3	–	0
Miami (OH)		–		1	–	5	–	0
Nebraska		–		1	–	7	–	1
North Dakota Agricultural		–		0	–	1	–	0
Baldwin–Wallace		–		0	–	4	–	0

The 1899 Rush Medical football team was an American football team that represented Rush Medical College in the 1899 college football season. The Medics compiled a 3–4 record, against a plethora of major college football opponents, including Northwestern, Notre Dame, a 9–2 Wisconsin team, and an 8–0–1 Iowa eleven, all on the road.

== Schedule ==
Date	Opponent	Site	Result	Source
October 7	at Northwestern	Sheppard Field; Evanston, IL	W 6–0	
October 21	at Iowa	Iowa Field; Iowa City, IA	L 0–17	
October 28	at Wisconsin	Randall Field; Madison, WI	L 0–10	
November 4	at Notre Dame	Cartier Field; Notre Dame, IN	L 0–17	
November 11	at Saint Charles Athletic Club	St. Charles, IL	L 0–6	
November 18	Lake Forest	Gaelic Association Grounds; Chicago, IL	W 38–0	
November 30	at Illinois Wesleyan	Bloomington, IL	W 6–5	
