= 1899 Washington University football team =

American college football season

1899 Washington University football
- Conference: Independent
- Record: 5–1
- Head coach: Arthur N. Sager (1st season)
- Home stadium: Pastime Park, Handlan's Park, Athletic Park

1899 Midwestern college football independents records
	Conf.			Overall
Team	W	L	T	W		L		T
Kansas		–		10	–	0	–	0
North Dakota		–		6	–	0	–	0
Detroit College		–		5	–	0	–	0
Lincoln (MO)		–		1	–	0	–	0
Ohio State		–		9	–	0	–	1
Iowa		–		8	–	0	–	1
Washington University		–		5	–	1	–	0
Missouri		–		9	–	2	–	0
Chicago P&S		–		4	–	1	–	0
Mount Union		–		5	–	1	–	1
Indiana		–		6	–	2	–	0
South Dakota Agricultural		–		3	–	1	–	0
Wabash		–		1	–	0	–	1
Cincinnati		–		5	–	2	–	0
Drake		–		5	–	2	–	0
Heidelberg		–		5	–	2	–	0
Buchtel		–		2	–	1	–	0
Doane		–		2	–	1	–	0
Northern Illinois State		–		1	–	0	–	2
Notre Dame		–		6	–	3	–	1
Central Michigan		–		3	–	2	–	0
Fairmount		–		2	–	1	–	2
Carthage		–		3	–	2	–	1
Western Reserve		–		5	–	4	–	0
Wittenberg		–		5	–	4	–	0
Iowa State		–		5	–	4	–	1
College of Emporia		–		1	–	1	–	1
Ohio		–		2	–	2	–	0
Rush Medical		–		3	–	3	–	1
Ohio Wesleyan		–		5	–	5	–	0
Haskell		–		4	–	5	–	0
Lake Forest		–		4	–	6	–	2
Kansas State		–		2	–	3	–	0
Iowa State Normal		–		1	–	3	–	2
Washburn		–		2	–	5	–	2
Butler		–		1	–	3	–	0
Miami (OH)		–		1	–	5	–	0
Nebraska		–		1	–	7	–	1
North Dakota Agricultural		–		0	–	1	–	0
Baldwin–Wallace		–		0	–	4	–	0

The 1899 Washington University football team represented Washington University in St. Louis as an independent during the 1899 college football season. Led by Arthur N. Sager in his first and only season as head coach, Washington University compiled a record of 5–1.

== Schedule ==
Date	Time	Opponent	Site	Result	Attendance	Source
October 7		Smith Academy	Pastime Park; St. Louis, MO	W 22–0		
October 28		West Ends	Handlan's Park; St. Louis, MO	W 26–0 or 31–0		
November 4		Knox	Handlan's Park; St. Louis, MO	W 6–5		
November 11		Illinois Wesleyan	Handlan's Park; St. Louis, MO	W 6–0	500	
November 18	2:30 p.m.	Missouri	Athletic Park; St. Louis, MO	L 11–33		
November 30		Christian Brothers (MO)	Athletic Park; St. Louis, MO	W 11–10	3,000	
