= 1899 Iowa State Cyclones football team =

American college football season

1899 Iowa State Cyclones football
- Conference: Independent
- Record: 5-4-1
- Head coach: Pop Warner (5th season) & Joe Meyers (1st season)
- Captain: C. J. Griffith

1899 Midwestern college football independents records
	Conf.			Overall
Team	W	L	T	W		L		T
Kansas		–		10	–	0	–	0
North Dakota		–		6	–	0	–	0
Detroit College		–		5	–	0	–	0
Lincoln (MO)		–		1	–	0	–	0
Ohio State		–		9	–	0	–	1
Iowa		–		8	–	0	–	1
Washington University		–		5	–	1	–	0
Missouri		–		9	–	2	–	0
Chicago P&S		–		4	–	1	–	0
Mount Union		–		5	–	1	–	1
Indiana		–		6	–	2	–	0
South Dakota Agricultural		–		3	–	1	–	0
Wabash		–		1	–	0	–	1
Cincinnati		–		5	–	2	–	0
Drake		–		5	–	2	–	0
Heidelberg		–		5	–	2	–	0
Buchtel		–		2	–	1	–	0
Doane		–		2	–	1	–	0
Northern Illinois State		–		1	–	0	–	2
Notre Dame		–		6	–	3	–	1
Central Michigan		–		3	–	2	–	0
Fairmount		–		2	–	1	–	2
Carthage		–		3	–	2	–	1
Western Reserve		–		5	–	4	–	0
Wittenberg		–		5	–	4	–	0
Iowa State		–		5	–	4	–	1
College of Emporia		–		1	–	1	–	1
Ohio		–		2	–	2	–	0
Ohio Wesleyan		–		5	–	5	–	0
Haskell		–		4	–	5	–	0
Lake Forest		–		4	–	6	–	2
Rush Medical		–		3	–	4	–	0
Kansas State		–		2	–	3	–	0
Iowa State Normal		–		1	–	3	–	2
Washburn		–		2	–	5	–	2
Butler		–		1	–	3	–	0
Miami (OH)		–		1	–	5	–	0
Nebraska		–		1	–	7	–	1
North Dakota Agricultural		–		0	–	1	–	0
Baldwin–Wallace		–		0	–	4	–	0

The 1899 Iowa State Cyclones football team represented Iowa State College of Agricultural and Mechanic Arts (later renamed Iowa State University) as an independent during the 1899 college football season. Under head coaches Pop Warner and Joe Meyers, the Cyclones compiled a 5–4–1 record, and outscored all opponents by a combined total of 118 to 38. The team won the first four games by a combined score of 107 to 0, then failed to score a point in the final five games. C. J. Griffith was the team captain.

Between 1892 and 1913, the football team played on a field that later became the site of the university's Parks Library.

== Schedule ==
Date	Opponent	Site	Result	Source
September 16	at Panora	Panora, IA	W 23–0	
September 30	at Cornell (IA)	Mount Vernon, IA	W 32–0	
October 6	Nebraska	State Field; Ames, IA (rivalry)	W 33–0	
October 11	at Simpson	Indianola, IA	W 18–0	
October 14	vs. South Dakota	Riverside Park; Sioux City, IA	W 11–6	
October 21	at Minnesota	Northrop Field; Minneapolis, MN	L 0–6	
October 27	at Iowa	Iowa Field; Iowa City, IA (rivalry)	L 0–5	
November 3	vs. Grinnell	Drake Athleic Field; Des Moines, IA	L 0–15	
November 10	at Iowa State Normal	Cedar Falls, IA	T 0–0	
November 18	Grinnell	State Field; Ames, IA	L 0–6	
