= 1899 Lincoln Tigers football team =

American college football season

1899 Lincoln Tigers football
- Conference: Independent
- Record: 3–0
- Home stadium: Cottage Place Park

1899 Midwestern college football independents records
	Conf.			Overall
Team	W	L	T	W		L		T
Kansas		–		10	–	0	–	0
North Dakota		–		6	–	0	–	0
Detroit College		–		5	–	0	–	0
Lincoln (MO)		–		1	–	0	–	0
Ohio State		–		9	–	0	–	1
Iowa		–		8	–	0	–	1
Washington University		–		5	–	1	–	0
Missouri		–		9	–	2	–	0
Chicago P&S		–		4	–	1	–	0
Mount Union		–		5	–	1	–	1
Indiana		–		6	–	2	–	0
South Dakota Agricultural		–		3	–	1	–	0
Wabash		–		1	–	0	–	1
Cincinnati		–		5	–	2	–	0
Drake		–		5	–	2	–	0
Heidelberg		–		5	–	2	–	0
Buchtel		–		2	–	1	–	0
Doane		–		2	–	1	–	0
Northern Illinois State		–		1	–	0	–	2
Notre Dame		–		6	–	3	–	1
Central Michigan		–		3	–	2	–	0
Fairmount		–		2	–	1	–	2
Carthage		–		3	–	2	–	1
Western Reserve		–		5	–	4	–	0
Wittenberg		–		5	–	4	–	0
Iowa State		–		5	–	4	–	1
College of Emporia		–		1	–	1	–	1
Ohio		–		2	–	2	–	0
Rush Medical		–		3	–	3	–	1
Ohio Wesleyan		–		5	–	5	–	0
Haskell		–		4	–	5	–	0
Lake Forest		–		4	–	6	–	2
Kansas State		–		2	–	3	–	0
Iowa State Normal		–		1	–	3	–	2
Washburn		–		2	–	5	–	2
Butler		–		1	–	3	–	0
Miami (OH)		–		1	–	5	–	0
Nebraska		–		1	–	7	–	1
North Dakota Agricultural		–		0	–	1	–	0
Baldwin–Wallace		–		0	–	4	–	0

The 1899 Lincoln Tigers football team represented Lincoln Institute—now known as Lincoln University—in Jefferson City, Missouri as an independent during the 1899 college football season. The Lincoln football team finished the season with a record of 3–0, and a 42 to 10 point differential. After defeating George R. Smith College, 15–10. The Sedalia Democrat first erroneously reported the outcome of the game on December 1 as a 16–15 win for George R. Smith. The players and coach of Lincoln, as well as the game referee, all signed a written statement agreeing that Lincoln won by a score of 15–10. The Sedalia Evening Sentinel, printed afterwards, corrected the mistaken score.

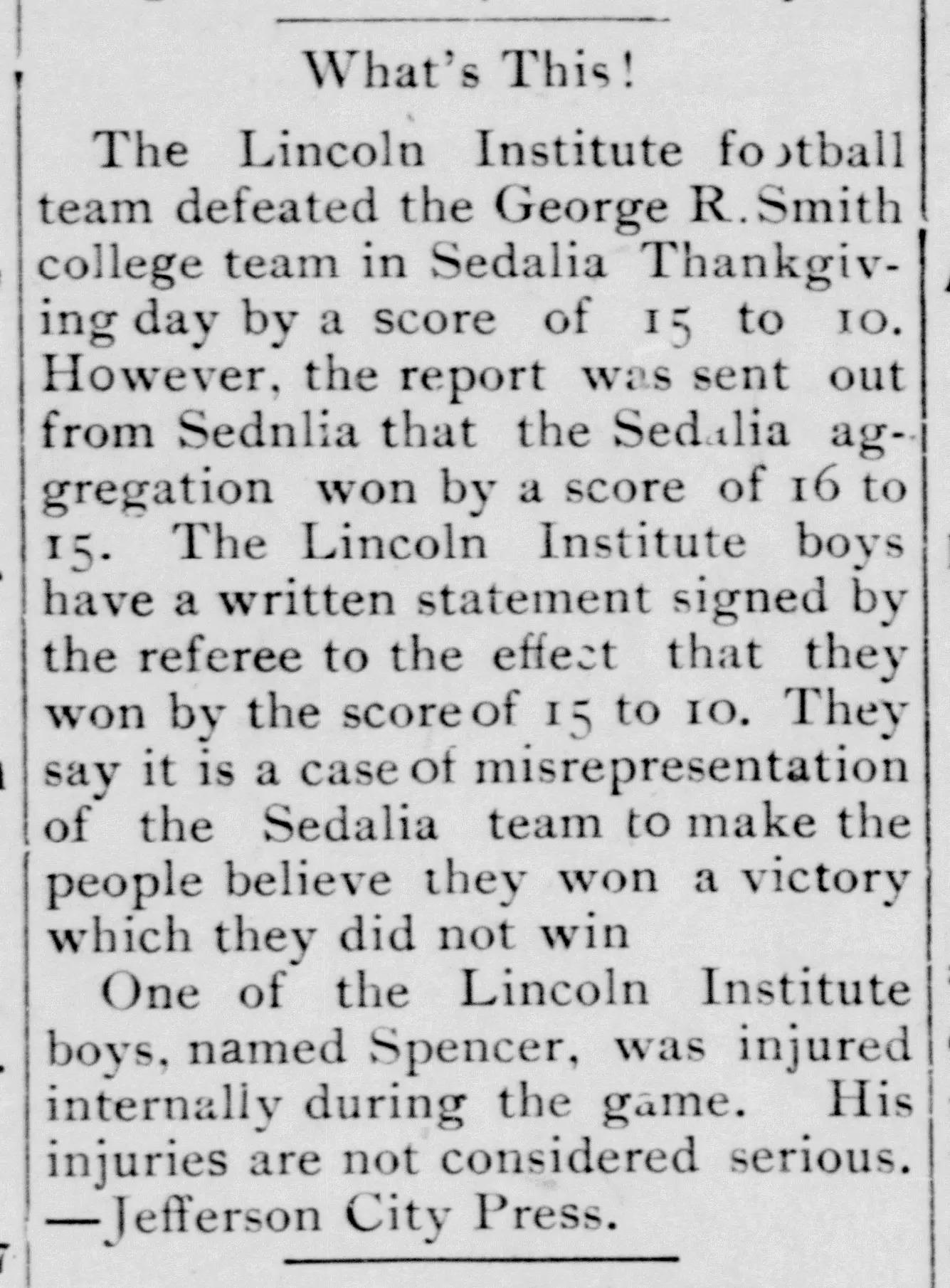

== Schedule ==
Date	Opponent	Site	Result	Source
October 21	Sumner High School	Cottage Place Park; Jefferson City, MO	W 17–0	
November 13	Columbia Negro School	Jefferson City, MO	W 10–0	
November 23	at George R. Smith	Sedalia, MO	W 15–10	
