= 1899 Lake Forest Foresters football team =

American college football season

1899 Lake Forest Foresters football
- Conference: Independent
- Record: 4–6–2
- Head coach: David H. Jackson (1st season)

1899 Midwestern college football independents records
	Conf.			Overall
Team	W	L	T	W		L		T
Kansas		–		10	–	0	–	0
North Dakota		–		6	–	0	–	0
Detroit College		–		5	–	0	–	0
Lincoln (MO)		–		1	–	0	–	0
Ohio State		–		9	–	0	–	1
Iowa		–		8	–	0	–	1
Washington University		–		5	–	1	–	0
Missouri		–		9	–	2	–	0
Chicago P&S		–		4	–	1	–	0
Mount Union		–		5	–	1	–	1
Indiana		–		6	–	2	–	0
South Dakota Agricultural		–		3	–	1	–	0
Wabash		–		1	–	0	–	1
Cincinnati		–		5	–	2	–	0
Drake		–		5	–	2	–	0
Heidelberg		–		5	–	2	–	0
Buchtel		–		2	–	1	–	0
Doane		–		2	–	1	–	0
Northern Illinois State		–		1	–	0	–	2
Notre Dame		–		6	–	3	–	1
Central Michigan		–		3	–	2	–	0
Fairmount		–		2	–	1	–	2
Carthage		–		3	–	2	–	1
Western Reserve		–		5	–	4	–	0
Wittenberg		–		5	–	4	–	0
Iowa State		–		5	–	4	–	1
College of Emporia		–		1	–	1	–	1
Ohio		–		2	–	2	–	0
Rush Medical		–		3	–	3	–	1
Ohio Wesleyan		–		5	–	5	–	0
Haskell		–		4	–	5	–	0
Lake Forest		–		4	–	6	–	2
Kansas State		–		2	–	3	–	0
Iowa State Normal		–		1	–	3	–	2
Washburn		–		2	–	5	–	2
Butler		–		1	–	3	–	0
Miami (OH)		–		1	–	5	–	0
Nebraska		–		1	–	7	–	1
North Dakota Agricultural		–		0	–	1	–	0
Baldwin–Wallace		–		0	–	4	–	0

The 1899 Lake Forest football team was an American football team that represented the Lake Forest University in the 1899 college football season.

== Schedule ==
Date	Time	Opponent	Site	Result	Source
September 23		Lake View High School	Lake Forest, IL	W 11–5	
September 30		at Wisconsin	Randall Field; Madison, WI	L 0–45	
October 7		Lake Forest Alumni	Lake Forest, Il	T 0–0	
October 14		Notre Dame	Cartier Field; Notre Dame, IN	L 0–38	
October 21		South Side Academy	Lake Forest, IL	W 11–5	
October 25	3:00 p.m.	at Northwestern	Sheppard Field; Evanston, IL	L 0–16	
November 1		Waukegan High School	Lake Forest, IL	W 17–0	
November 4		at Beloit	Beloit, WI	L 0–28	
November 11		at Kalamazoo	Kalamazoo, MI	L 6–21	
November 18		at Rush Medical	Gaelic Athletic grounds; Chicago, IL	L 0–38	
November 25		Bennett Medical	Lake Forest, IL	T 0–0	
November 30		at Pontiac High School	Pontiac, IL	W 21–6	
