= 1899 Iowa Hawkeyes football team =

American college football season

1899 Iowa Hawkeyes football
- Conference: Independent
- Record: 8–0–1
- Head coach: Alden Knipe (2nd season)
- Captain: Moray Eby
- Home stadium: Iowa Field

1899 Midwestern college football independents records
	Conf.			Overall
Team	W	L	T	W		L		T
Kansas		–		10	–	0	–	0
North Dakota		–		6	–	0	–	0
Detroit College		–		5	–	0	–	0
Lincoln (MO)		–		1	–	0	–	0
Ohio State		–		9	–	0	–	1
Iowa		–		8	–	0	–	1
Washington University		–		5	–	1	–	0
Missouri		–		9	–	2	–	0
Chicago P&S		–		4	–	1	–	0
Mount Union		–		5	–	1	–	1
Indiana		–		6	–	2	–	0
South Dakota Agricultural		–		3	–	1	–	0
Wabash		–		1	–	0	–	1
Cincinnati		–		5	–	2	–	0
Drake		–		5	–	2	–	0
Heidelberg		–		5	–	2	–	0
Buchtel		–		2	–	1	–	0
Doane		–		2	–	1	–	0
Northern Illinois State		–		1	–	0	–	2
Notre Dame		–		6	–	3	–	1
Central Michigan		–		3	–	2	–	0
Fairmount		–		2	–	1	–	2
Carthage		–		3	–	2	–	1
Western Reserve		–		5	–	4	–	0
Wittenberg		–		5	–	4	–	0
Iowa State		–		5	–	4	–	1
College of Emporia		–		1	–	1	–	1
Ohio		–		2	–	2	–	0
Rush Medical		–		3	–	3	–	1
Ohio Wesleyan		–		5	–	5	–	0
Haskell		–		4	–	5	–	0
Lake Forest		–		4	–	6	–	2
Kansas State		–		2	–	3	–	0
Iowa State Normal		–		1	–	3	–	2
Washburn		–		2	–	5	–	2
Butler		–		1	–	3	–	0
Miami (OH)		–		1	–	5	–	0
Nebraska		–		1	–	7	–	1
North Dakota Agricultural		–		0	–	1	–	0
Baldwin–Wallace		–		0	–	4	–	0

The 1899 Iowa Hawkeyes football team was an American football team that represented the State University of Iowa ("S.U.I."), now commonly known as the University of Iowa, as an independent during the 1899 college football season. In their second year under head coach Alden Knipe, the Hawkeyes compiled an 8–0–1 record, shut out eight of nine opponents, and outscored all opponents by a total of 221 to 5. The Hawkeyes concluded their season with a 58–0 victory over Illinois, the worst defeat suffered by an Illinois football team up to that time. Other highlights included a 5–5 tie with Chicago and a 30–0 victory over Nebraska. The 1899 defense still holds Iowa single-season records for fewest points allowed (five), fewest touchdowns allowed (one), and fewest points allowed per game (0.6).

Against Illinois, fullback John G. Griffith returned a punt 85 yards as Iowa won, 58–0, to cap its undefeated season. After the game, referee R. T. Hoagland of Princeton said, "The dodging run of Griffith down the field for a touchdown was the best piece of individual playing that I ever saw. The men (of the 1899 Hawkeyes) are all stars; they make the best team I ever saw."

Quarterback Clyde Williams was later inducted into the Iowa Letterwinners Club Hall of Fame. Tackle Moray Eby was the team captain.

The team played its home games at Iowa Field in Iowa City, Iowa.

== Schedule ==
Date	Time	Opponent	Site	Result	Attendance	Source
September 23		Iowa State Normal	Iowa Field; Iowa City, IA	W 22–0		
October 7		at Chicago	Marshall Field; Chicago, IL	T 5–5		
October 14		Penn (IA)	Iowa Field; Iowa City, IA	W 35–0		
October 21		Rush Medical	Iowa Field; Iowa City, IA	W 17–0		
October 28		Iowa State	Iowa Field; Iowa City, IA (rivalry)	W 5–0		
November 4	3:00 p.m.	vs. Nebraska	Ames Avenue Park; Omaha, NE (rivalry)	W 30–0		
November 11		Grinnell	Iowa Field; Iowa City, IA	W 16–0		
November 18		Knox (IL)	Iowa Field; Iowa City, IA	W 33–0		
November 30		vs. Illinois	Rock Island baseball park; Rock Island, IL	W 58–0	4,000–10,000	

== Players ==
- Mark Baker, center
- James Brockway, guard
- Emmett Burrier, guard
- Moray Eby, tackle and captain
- Billy Edson, halfback
- John G. Griffith, fullback
- Lloyd Howell, tackle
- Frank Meggers, fullback
- Ray Morton, halfback
- Joseph Warner, tackle
- Bert Watters, end
- Clyde Williams, quarterback
- Fred A. Williams, end
