= 1899 Western Reserve football team =

American college football season

1899 Western Reserve football
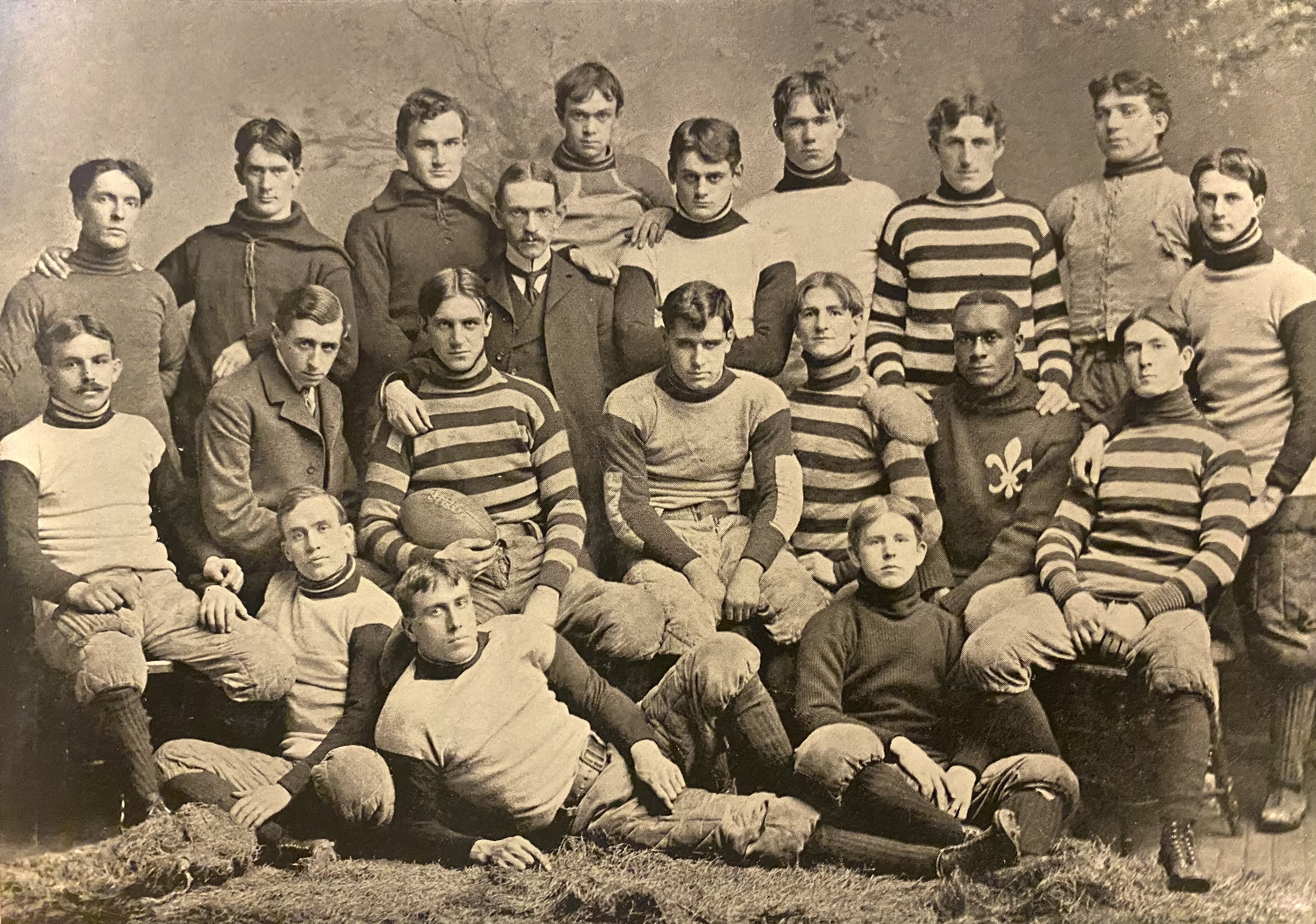
- Conference: Independent
- Record: 5–4
- Head coach: David C. MacAndrew (2nd season)
- Captain: Bill Laub

1899 Midwestern college football independents records
	Conf.			Overall
Team	W	L	T	W		L		T
Kansas		–		10	–	0	–	0
North Dakota		–		6	–	0	–	0
Detroit College		–		5	–	0	–	0
Lincoln (MO)		–		1	–	0	–	0
Ohio State		–		9	–	0	–	1
Iowa		–		8	–	0	–	1
Washington University		–		5	–	1	–	0
Missouri		–		9	–	2	–	0
Chicago P&S		–		4	–	1	–	0
Mount Union		–		5	–	1	–	1
Indiana		–		6	–	2	–	0
South Dakota Agricultural		–		3	–	1	–	0
Wabash		–		1	–	0	–	1
Cincinnati		–		5	–	2	–	0
Drake		–		5	–	2	–	0
Heidelberg		–		5	–	2	–	0
Buchtel		–		2	–	1	–	0
Doane		–		2	–	1	–	0
Northern Illinois State		–		1	–	0	–	2
Notre Dame		–		6	–	3	–	1
Central Michigan		–		3	–	2	–	0
Fairmount		–		2	–	1	–	2
Carthage		–		3	–	2	–	1
Western Reserve		–		5	–	4	–	0
Wittenberg		–		5	–	4	–	0
Iowa State		–		5	–	4	–	1
College of Emporia		–		1	–	1	–	1
Ohio		–		2	–	2	–	0
Rush Medical		–		3	–	3	–	1
Ohio Wesleyan		–		5	–	5	–	0
Haskell		–		4	–	5	–	0
Lake Forest		–		4	–	6	–	2
Kansas State		–		2	–	3	–	0
Iowa State Normal		–		1	–	3	–	2
Washburn		–		2	–	5	–	2
Butler		–		1	–	3	–	0
Miami (OH)		–		1	–	5	–	0
Nebraska		–		1	–	7	–	1
North Dakota Agricultural		–		0	–	1	–	0
Baldwin–Wallace		–		0	–	4	–	0

The 1899 Western Reserve football team represented Western Reserve University—known as Case Western Reserve University—in the American city of Cleveland, Ohio, during the 1899 college football season. Led by David C. MacAndrew in his second and final season as head coach, Western Reserve compiled a record of 5–4 and outscore opponents by a total of 71 to 44. The team captain was Bill Laub.

== Schedule ==
Date	Opponent	Site	Result	Source
October 7	Baldwin–Wallace	Cleveland, OH	W 17–0	
October 14	at Michigan	Regents Field; Ann Arbor, MI	L 0–17	
October 21	Kenyon	Cleveland, OH	W 6–5	
October 28	at Washington & Jefferson	College Park; Washington, PA	L 0–6	
November 4	at Ohio State	Ohio Field; Columbus, OH	L 0–6	
November 11	at Oberlin	Oberlin, OH	W 6–0	
November 18	Buffalo	Cleveland, OH	L 0–5	
November 25	Ohio Wesleyan	Cleveland, OH	W 26–0	
November 30	Case	League Park; Cleveland, OH	W 16–5	

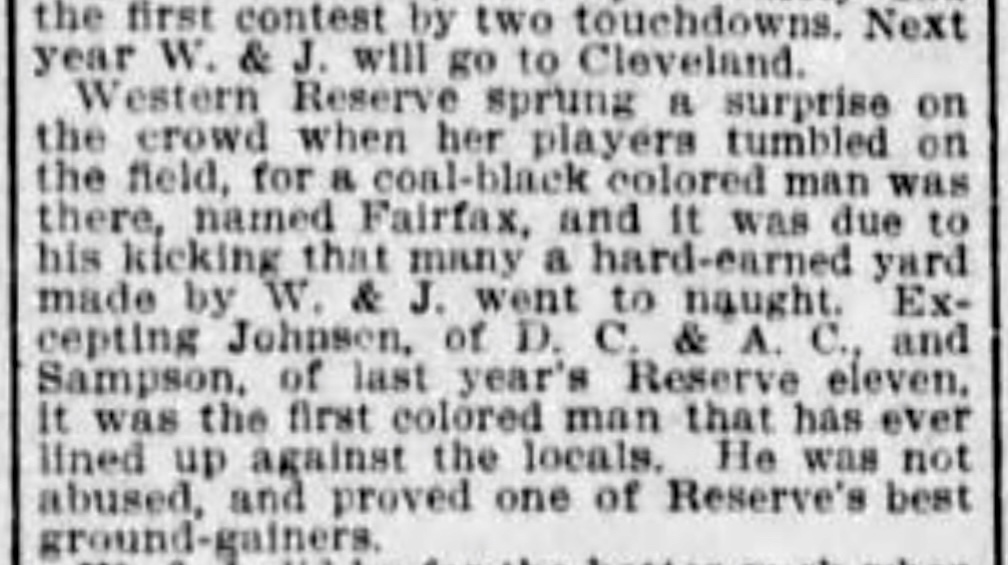
Dan Fairfax was the second Black football player to play for Case Western Reserve University and the first to ever play in front of Washington & Jefferson's home crowd in Washington, PA.
