= 1899 Indiana Hoosiers football team =

American college football season

1899 Indiana Hoosiers football
- Conference: Independent
- Record: 6–2
- Head coach: James H. Horne (2nd season)
- Captain: John Hubbard
- Home stadium: Jordan Field

1899 Midwestern college football independents records
	Conf.			Overall
Team	W	L	T	W		L		T
Kansas		–		10	–	0	–	0
North Dakota		–		6	–	0	–	0
Detroit College		–		5	–	0	–	0
Lincoln (MO)		–		1	–	0	–	0
Ohio State		–		9	–	0	–	1
Iowa		–		8	–	0	–	1
Washington University		–		5	–	1	–	0
Missouri		–		9	–	2	–	0
Chicago P&S		–		4	–	1	–	0
Mount Union		–		5	–	1	–	1
Indiana		–		6	–	2	–	0
South Dakota Agricultural		–		3	–	1	–	0
Wabash		–		1	–	0	–	1
Cincinnati		–		5	–	2	–	0
Drake		–		5	–	2	–	0
Heidelberg		–		5	–	2	–	0
Buchtel		–		2	–	1	–	0
Doane		–		2	–	1	–	0
Northern Illinois State		–		1	–	0	–	2
Notre Dame		–		6	–	3	–	1
Central Michigan		–		3	–	2	–	0
Fairmount		–		2	–	1	–	2
Carthage		–		3	–	2	–	1
Western Reserve		–		5	–	4	–	0
Wittenberg		–		5	–	4	–	0
Iowa State		–		5	–	4	–	1
College of Emporia		–		1	–	1	–	1
Ohio		–		2	–	2	–	0
Ohio Wesleyan		–		5	–	5	–	0
Haskell		–		4	–	5	–	0
Lake Forest		–		4	–	6	–	2
Rush Medical		–		3	–	4	–	0
Kansas State		–		2	–	3	–	0
Iowa State Normal		–		1	–	3	–	2
Washburn		–		2	–	5	–	2
Butler		–		1	–	3	–	0
Miami (OH)		–		1	–	5	–	0
Nebraska		–		1	–	7	–	1
North Dakota Agricultural		–		0	–	1	–	0
Baldwin–Wallace		–		0	–	4	–	0

The 1899 Indiana Hoosiers football team was an American football team that represented Indiana University Bloomington during the 1899 college football season. In their second season under head coach James H. Horne, the Hoosiers compiled a 6–2 record and outscored their opponents by a combined total of 133 to 33. 1899 was the first year Indiana beat Purdue football, establishing a state rivalry.

== Schedule ==
Date	Opponent	Site	Result	Attendance	Source
October 7	Rose Polytechnic	Jordan Field; Bloomington, IN	W 16–0		
October 14	at Illinois	Illinois Field; Champaign, IL (rivalry)	W 5–0		
October 23	at Notre Dame	Cartier Field; Notre Dame, IN	L 0–17		
October 28	at Vanderbilt	Dudley Field; Nashville, TN	W 20–0		
November 4	Cincinnati	Jordan Field; Bloomington, IN	W 35–0		
November 13	Depauw	Jordan Field; Bloomington, IN	W 34–0		
November 18	at Northwestern	Sheppard Field; Evanston, IL	L 6–11	1,000	
November 30	at Purdue	Stuart Field; West Lafayette, IN (rivalry)	W 17–5		

== Personnel ==
=== Roster ===
Name	Position	Year
Andrews		
Highly		
Pike		
D. O. McGovney		
W. P. Ray		
Harry R. Davidson		
Hurley		
John Clark Hubbard (C)		
Johnson		
Max Hawley		
Frank R. Aydelotte		
John A. Foster		Sophomore
Niezer		
George Teter		
E. J. Smith		
Barbour		

=== Staffing ===
- James H. Horne, coach
- K. L Brooks, coach
- Henry. Thew Stephenson, manager
