= 1899 Kansas Jayhawks football team =

American college football season

1899 Kansas Jayhawks football
- Conference: Independent
- Record: 10–0
- Head coach: Fielding H. Yost (1st season)
- Captain: Hubert Avery
- Home stadium: McCook Field

1899 Midwestern college football independents records
	Conf.			Overall
Team	W	L	T	W		L		T
Kansas		–		10	–	0	–	0
North Dakota		–		6	–	0	–	0
Detroit College		–		5	–	0	–	0
Lincoln (MO)		–		1	–	0	–	0
Ohio State		–		9	–	0	–	1
Iowa		–		8	–	0	–	1
Washington University		–		5	–	1	–	0
Missouri		–		9	–	2	–	0
Chicago P&S		–		4	–	1	–	0
Mount Union		–		5	–	1	–	1
Indiana		–		6	–	2	–	0
South Dakota Agricultural		–		3	–	1	–	0
Wabash		–		1	–	0	–	1
Cincinnati		–		5	–	2	–	0
Drake		–		5	–	2	–	0
Heidelberg		–		5	–	2	–	0
Buchtel		–		2	–	1	–	0
Doane		–		2	–	1	–	0
Northern Illinois State		–		1	–	0	–	2
Notre Dame		–		6	–	3	–	1
Central Michigan		–		3	–	2	–	0
Fairmount		–		2	–	1	–	2
Carthage		–		3	–	2	–	1
Western Reserve		–		5	–	4	–	0
Wittenberg		–		5	–	4	–	0
Iowa State		–		5	–	4	–	1
College of Emporia		–		1	–	1	–	1
Ohio		–		2	–	2	–	0
Ohio Wesleyan		–		5	–	5	–	0
Haskell		–		4	–	5	–	0
Lake Forest		–		4	–	6	–	2
Rush Medical		–		3	–	4	–	0
Kansas State		–		2	–	3	–	0
Iowa State Normal		–		1	–	3	–	2
Washburn		–		2	–	5	–	2
Butler		–		1	–	3	–	0
Miami (OH)		–		1	–	5	–	0
Nebraska		–		1	–	7	–	1
North Dakota Agricultural		–		0	–	1	–	0
Baldwin–Wallace		–		0	–	4	–	0

The 1899 Kansas Jayhawks football team represented the University of Kansas in the 1899 college football season. In their first and only season under head coach Fielding H. Yost, the Jayhawks compiled an undefeated 10–0 record, shut out six of their ten opponents, scored 280 points (28.0 points per games) and allowed only 37 points (3.7 points per game). The season included victories over Haskell (12–0 and 18–0), Drake (29–5), Nebraska (36–20), and Missouri (34–6).

Bennie Owen, who later coached at Oklahoma for 22 years, was the team's quarterback, and Hubert Avery was the team captain. Owen and coach Yost were both subsequently inducted into the College Football Hall of Fame.

== Schedule ==
Date	Time	Opponent	Site	Result	Attendance	Source
September 30		Haskell	McCook Field; Lawrence, KS	W 12–0	500	
October 7		Washburn	McCook Field; Lawrence, KS	W 35–0	400	
October 14		Ottawa (KS)	McCook Field; Lawrence, KS	W 29–6		
October 21		Drake	McCook Field; Lawrence, KS	W 29–5	800	
October 28		Haskell	Lawrence, KS	W 18–0		
November 4		at Ottawa (KS)	Ottawa, KS	W 29–0		
November 11	2:30 p.m.	at Kansas State Normal	Mit-way Park; Emporia, KS	W 35–0		
November 18		at Nebraska	Lincoln, NE (rivalry)	W 36–20		
November 25		Washburn	McCook Field; Lawrence, KS	W 23–0		
November 30		vs. Missouri	Exposition Park; Kansas City, MO (Border War)	W 34–6	8,000	

== Season summary ==
=== Preseason ===
On February 17, 1899, Hubert C. Avery, captain of the 1899 Kansas football team, was married to Nellie Criss.

In June 1899, the University of Kansas Athletic Association offered Nebraska football coach Fielding H. Yost $350 and an additional $150 conditionally to coach the school's football team. He accepted the offer on June 7, 1899. After spending the summer in Colorado, Yost arrived in Lawrence, Kansas, on September 4, 1899, and football practice began the following day.

On September 19, 1899, the Lawrence Daily Journal reported on a practice football game in which 37-year-old Dr. James Naismith (the coach of the Kansas basketball team and inventor of the sport) played against the 13-man varsity squad. The Journal reported that the varsity squad played with "snap and vigor" and credited Yost's coaching: "Coach Yost is giving his men instructions as to how to play to prevent gains when the other side has the ball, and though the Kansas line this year will be a light one, compared with what it has been in previous years, the boys are being coached so that they will be able to hold a much heavier lot of men."

On September 21, 1899, the Journal reported in further detail on Yost's training sessions, noting that the afternoon's practice began with a focus on punting and catching the ball. The Journal also reported on the arrival of Moore, a newly enrolled and "remarkably quick and steady" halfback and noted that the team as a whole was "developing into a remarkably fast lot of players."

One of the changes instituted by Yost was described in a press account as follows: "The Kansas boys have lived separate from the rest of the students and ate specially selected and prepared food for the last two months [October and November], with Coach Yost as their only mentor." Yost also reportedly developed 25 "trick plays" that he practiced with his Kansas players, "but never had occasion to use one of them."

=== Game 1: Haskell ===
On September 30, Kansas opened its season with a 12–0 victory over the Haskell Indians before a crowd of 500 spectators at McCook Field in Lawrence. All 12 points were scored in the second half, and the Lawrence Daily Journal reported that the score was the result of "the wonderful hard work of Moore." The playing field was "hard, rough and dusty", and the Journal called it one of the "roughest games ever played at Lawrence," noting that a number of Haskell players were "seriously hurt" and that two "were in violent convulsions for a short time after their injuries." Questions were raised after the Haskell game as to the amateur status of all of the Kansas players.

=== Game 2: Washburn ===
On October 7, 1899, Kansas defeated the team from Washburn University by a 35–0 score in Lawrence. Tucker ran for two touchdowns for Kansas. The Lawrence Daily Journal reported that the Washburn team was "as weak as ever" and credited the performance of Tucker, Avery, Wilcox, Nofsinger, and Moore. The Journal also noted that, during the game, "dust arose in clouds as the players moved back and forth across the field, and it was impossible to tell who had carried the ball until after the dust had been blown aside."

=== Game 3: Ottawa (KS) ===
On October 14, 1899, Kansas played the team from Ottawa University, a team that was "regarded as one of the strongest in the state." Kansas won the game by a 29–6 score in Lawrence. According to a press account, the "feature of the game was Captain Avery's long run for a touchdown in the second half." The Lawrence Daily Journal reported that the game was "almost too one-sided to be interesting" and noted that Ottawa's only points were scored near the end of the game after a controversial call in which the officials ruled that Moore had fumbled, despite the fact that "the Kansas men had called down."

=== Game 4: Drake ===
On October 21, 1899, Kansas faced Drake, a team which had been undefeated since the 1897 season. The game was expected to be Kansas' toughest contest with the possible exception of Missouri, and the Kansas players were reportedly training under coach Yost with a focus on "perfecting signal week this week, team plays, and new strategems with all of which they expect to surprise their most ardent champions." Kansas won the game by a 29–5 score before a crowd of 800 spectators in Lawrence. The Kansas City Journal reported that Tucker was the star player and that Kansas "never played better ball than she did to-day." The Lawrence Daily Journal reported that the game was played "under a broiling sun" and "on a dusty field" and that Tucker was "easily the star" for Kansas.

=== Game 5: Haskell ===
On October 28, 1899, Kansas defeated Haskell for the second time during the 1899 season, this time by an 18–0 score in Lawrence. In the second half, a Haskell player was ejected from the game for slugging Moore of Kansas. Haskell disputed the ejection and when the umpire refused to reconsider, the entire Haskell team followed the ejected player off the field, and the umpire declared the game forfeited. Several long runs by Moulton were highlights of the game, including a 30-yard touchdown run on "a 'fake' play."

=== Game 6: Ottawa ===
On November 4, 1899, Kansas won its second game of the season against Ottawa, this one by a 29–0 score in Ottawa, Kansas. The Lawrence Daily Journal reported: "There was not much interest in the game."

=== Game 7: Kansas State Normal ===
On November 11, 1899, Kansas defeated Kansas State Normal by a 35–0 score at Emporia, Kansas. Kansas touchdowns were scored by Garvin, Moore, and Tucker. The Emporia team was "completely outclassed, as they have no coach and little practice."

=== Game 8: Nebraska ===
On November 18, 1899, Kansas faced Nebraska, the team that Fielding Yost had coached in 1898. Kansas won the game by a 36–20 score in Lincoln, Nebraska. Kansas scored six touchdowns, and Nebraska was held to four field goals (all by Benedict) and a safety. The Lawrence Daily Journal wrote that Kansas won the game "with ease", led by an "impregnable line" and with Moore, Tucker and Avery advancing the ball "with unfailing regularity and certain precision."

After the game, approximately 100 Kansas supporters marched through the streets back in Lawrence, a parade that included a duel between the University band and the Salvation Army band, with both units performing renditions of "A Hot Time". The Kansas supporters later "built a little bon fire out by the park."

=== Game 9: Washburn ===
On November 25, 1899, Kansas defeated Washburn for the second time of the season, this time by a 23–0 score in Lawrence. Kansas used substitutes in place of some of its starters to avoid incurring injuries prior to the Thanksgiving Day game against Missouri.

=== Game 10: Missouri ===
On Thanksgiving Day, November 30, 1899, Kansas concluded its season with a 34–6 victory over Missouri. The game drew a crowd of 8,000 spectators to Exposition Park in Kansas City.

The game was placed in jeopardy earlier in the month due to a dispute as to where the game would be played. Kansas signed a contract with the newly opened Convention Hall in Kansas City, Missouri (where William Jennings Bryan would accept his parties Presidential nomination the following June), for the game to be played there. In order to play the game indoors at Convention Hall, the playing field would have to have been reduced by approximately 50%. Missouri's coach White objected to playing the game indoors, noting that the low ceiling would not allow "good kicking", the sidelines would be formed by the building's walls and create a hazard to the players, and the crowd noise "would prevent signals being heard." For these reasons, Missouri insisted that the game be played outdoors on "regulation grounds" under the rules of the Western Intercollegiate Football Association, "or not at all." Ultimately, Kansas was released from its contract with the Convention Hall, and the game was played outdoors at the professional baseball park in Kansas City.

=== Post-season ===
On December 1, 1899, the Lawrence Daily World opined that coach Yost should be retained for another year and noted: "Trainer Yost has won golden opinions on every side and he deserves them all. He has a happy faculty of getting along with the players in such a way that they like him and he gets the best out of them. . . . Such good men are not loose long."

On December 4, 1899, coach Yost published an All-Western football team and selected seven of his own Kansas players for the unit: Smith at guard; Wilcox and Tucker at tackle; Algie at end; Owen at quarterback; Moore at halfback; and Avery at fullback.

In May 1900, Yost was hired by Stanford University in 1900, and the fortunes of the Kansas football team declined. The 1900 Kansas team compiled a 2–5–2 record.

== Players ==
The following players were the starters for Kansas through the fifth game of the season and in the Nebraska and Missouri games.

- John Algie – started 1 game at fullback, 1 game at left end
- Hubert Avery, 173 pounds – started 4 games at left halfback, 3 games at fullback
- Wyn Gavin, 170 pounds - started 6 games at left end
- William Hess, 175 pounds – started 5 games at center
- Isabel, 150 pounds – started 1 game at right end
- Rollo Krebs – started 2 games at left tackle
- Lucas, 165 pounds – started 2 games at fullback
- C. Meehan, 198 pounds - started 2 games at center
- Wade Moore, 184 pounds – started 7 games at right halfback
- Fay Moulton – started 1 game at left halfback (silver medalist in 100 meters in 1906 Olympics)
- Rolla Nofsinger, 186 pounds – started 6 games at right end
- Bennie Owen, 150 pounds – started 1 game at fullback, 5 games at quarterback (College Football Hall of Fame)
- Parks, 170 pounds – started 1 game at left guard
- Lonsdale Silver, 156 pounds – started 1 game at quarterback
- Thomas Smith, 195 pounds – started 7 games at right guard
- George Tucker, 185 pounds – started 5 games at left tackle, 2 games at left halfback
- Charles Wilcox, 186 pounds – started 7 games at right tackle
- David Woodward, 190 pounds – started 6 games at left guard

== Coaches ==
- Fielding H. Yost, head coach
- James Naismith, coach of the second eleven
