= 1899 North Dakota Agricultural Aggies football team =

American college football season

1899 North Dakota Agricultural Aggies football
- Conference: Independent
- Record: 0–1
- Head coach: Henry Luke Bolley (6th season)
- Captain: James McGuigan

1899 Midwestern college football independents records
	Conf.			Overall
Team	W	L	T	W		L		T
Kansas		–		10	–	0	–	0
North Dakota		–		6	–	0	–	0
Detroit College		–		5	–	0	–	0
Lincoln (MO)		–		1	–	0	–	0
Ohio State		–		9	–	0	–	1
Iowa		–		8	–	0	–	1
Washington University		–		5	–	1	–	0
Missouri		–		9	–	2	–	0
Chicago P&S		–		4	–	1	–	0
Mount Union		–		5	–	1	–	1
Indiana		–		6	–	2	–	0
South Dakota Agricultural		–		3	–	1	–	0
Wabash		–		1	–	0	–	1
Cincinnati		–		5	–	2	–	0
Drake		–		5	–	2	–	0
Heidelberg		–		5	–	2	–	0
Buchtel		–		2	–	1	–	0
Doane		–		2	–	1	–	0
Northern Illinois State		–		1	–	0	–	2
Notre Dame		–		6	–	3	–	1
Central Michigan		–		3	–	2	–	0
Fairmount		–		2	–	1	–	2
Carthage		–		3	–	2	–	1
Western Reserve		–		5	–	4	–	0
Wittenberg		–		5	–	4	–	0
Iowa State		–		5	–	4	–	1
College of Emporia		–		1	–	1	–	1
Ohio		–		2	–	2	–	0
Ohio Wesleyan		–		5	–	5	–	0
Haskell		–		4	–	5	–	0
Lake Forest		–		4	–	6	–	2
Rush Medical		–		3	–	4	–	0
Kansas State		–		2	–	3	–	0
Iowa State Normal		–		1	–	3	–	2
Washburn		–		2	–	5	–	2
Butler		–		1	–	3	–	0
Miami (OH)		–		1	–	5	–	0
Nebraska		–		1	–	7	–	1
North Dakota Agricultural		–		0	–	1	–	0
Baldwin–Wallace		–		0	–	4	–	0

The 1899 North Dakota Agricultural Aggies football team was an American football team that represented North Dakota Agricultural College (now known as North Dakota State University) as an independent during the 1899 college football season. They only played one game, and lost, to North Dakota.

== Schedule ==
Date	Opponent	Site	Result	Source
November 11	at North Dakota	U.A.A. Park; Grand Forks, ND (rivalry)	L 0–46	
