= 1899 North Dakota Flickertails football team =

American college football season

1899 North Dakota Flickertails football
- Conference: Independent
- Record: 6–0
- Head coach: Harry C. Loomis (1st season)
- Captain: Lynn J. Frazier

1899 Midwestern college football independents records
	Conf.			Overall
Team	W	L	T	W		L		T
Kansas		–		10	–	0	–	0
North Dakota		–		6	–	0	–	0
Detroit College		–		5	–	0	–	0
Lincoln (MO)		–		1	–	0	–	0
Ohio State		–		9	–	0	–	1
Iowa		–		8	–	0	–	1
Washington University		–		5	–	1	–	0
Missouri		–		9	–	2	–	0
Chicago P&S		–		4	–	1	–	0
Mount Union		–		5	–	1	–	1
Indiana		–		6	–	2	–	0
South Dakota Agricultural		–		3	–	1	–	0
Wabash		–		1	–	0	–	1
Cincinnati		–		5	–	2	–	0
Drake		–		5	–	2	–	0
Heidelberg		–		5	–	2	–	0
Buchtel		–		2	–	1	–	0
Doane		–		2	–	1	–	0
Northern Illinois State		–		1	–	0	–	2
Notre Dame		–		6	–	3	–	1
Central Michigan		–		3	–	2	–	0
Fairmount		–		2	–	1	–	2
Carthage		–		3	–	2	–	1
Western Reserve		–		5	–	4	–	0
Wittenberg		–		5	–	4	–	0
Iowa State		–		5	–	4	–	1
College of Emporia		–		1	–	1	–	1
Ohio		–		2	–	2	–	0
Rush Medical		–		3	–	3	–	1
Ohio Wesleyan		–		5	–	5	–	0
Haskell		–		4	–	5	–	0
Lake Forest		–		4	–	6	–	2
Kansas State		–		2	–	3	–	0
Iowa State Normal		–		1	–	3	–	2
Washburn		–		2	–	5	–	2
Butler		–		1	–	3	–	0
Miami (OH)		–		1	–	5	–	0
Nebraska		–		1	–	7	–	1
North Dakota Agricultural		–		0	–	1	–	0
Baldwin–Wallace		–		0	–	4	–	0

The 1899 North Dakota Flickertails football team was an American football team that represented University of North Dakota during the 1899 college football season. The team compiled a 6–0 record and outscored opponents by a total of 179 to 5.

The team was led by first-year head coach Harry C. "Babe" Loomis. Loomis was the school's first paid football coach, receiving $200 for the season.

The team captain was Lynn Frazier who later served as Governor of North Dakota from 1917 to 1921. Another player William Nuessle became chief justice of the North Dakota Supreme Court. A third, William Lemke, served as Attorney General of North Dakota from 1921 to 1922.

== Schedule ==
Date	Opponent	Site	Result
October 22	Moorhead Normal	Grand Forks, ND	W 57–0
October 30	Henley Athletic Association	Grand Forks, ND	W 18–0
November 3	Macalester College	Grand Forks, ND	W 6–5
November 11	North Dakota Agricultural	Grand Forks, ND (rivalry)	W 46–0
November 30	Dakota Wesleyan	Grand Forks, ND	W 41–0
December 1	at Litchfield High	Litchfield, MN	W 11–0
