= 1899 Haskell Indians football team =

American college football season

1899 Haskell Indians football
- Conference: Independent
- Record: 4–5
- Head coach: Shorty Hamill & Wylie G. Woodruff (1st season)

1899 Midwestern college football independents records
	Conf.			Overall
Team	W	L	T	W		L		T
Kansas		–		10	–	0	–	0
North Dakota		–		6	–	0	–	0
Detroit College		–		5	–	0	–	0
Lincoln (MO)		–		1	–	0	–	0
Ohio State		–		9	–	0	–	1
Iowa		–		8	–	0	–	1
Washington University		–		5	–	1	–	0
Missouri		–		9	–	2	–	0
Chicago P&S		–		4	–	1	–	0
Mount Union		–		5	–	1	–	1
Indiana		–		6	–	2	–	0
South Dakota Agricultural		–		3	–	1	–	0
Wabash		–		1	–	0	–	1
Cincinnati		–		5	–	2	–	0
Drake		–		5	–	2	–	0
Heidelberg		–		5	–	2	–	0
Buchtel		–		2	–	1	–	0
Doane		–		2	–	1	–	0
Northern Illinois State		–		1	–	0	–	2
Notre Dame		–		6	–	3	–	1
Central Michigan		–		3	–	2	–	0
Fairmount		–		2	–	1	–	2
Carthage		–		3	–	2	–	1
Western Reserve		–		5	–	4	–	0
Wittenberg		–		5	–	4	–	0
Iowa State		–		5	–	4	–	1
College of Emporia		–		1	–	1	–	1
Ohio		–		2	–	2	–	0
Ohio Wesleyan		–		5	–	5	–	0
Haskell		–		4	–	5	–	0
Lake Forest		–		4	–	6	–	2
Rush Medical		–		3	–	4	–	0
Kansas State		–		2	–	3	–	0
Iowa State Normal		–		1	–	3	–	2
Washburn		–		2	–	5	–	2
Butler		–		1	–	3	–	0
Miami (OH)		–		1	–	5	–	0
Nebraska		–		1	–	7	–	1
North Dakota Agricultural		–		0	–	1	–	0
Baldwin–Wallace		–		0	–	4	–	0

The 1899 Haskell Indians football team was an American football team that represented the Haskell Indian Institute (now known as Haskell Indian Nations University) as an independent during the 1899 college football season. The team compiled a 4–5 record. Shorty Hamill and Wylie G. Woodruff coached the team.

== Schedule ==
Date	Opponent	Site	Result	Source
September 23	Ottawa	Lawrence, KS	W 5–0	
September 30	at Kansas	McCook Field; Lawrence, KS	L 0–12	
October 7	at Tarkio	Tarkio, MO	W 22–0	
October 14	at Missouri	Rollins Field; Columbia, MO	L 0–17	
October 28	Kansas	Driving Park; Lawrence, KS	L 0–18	
October 30	at Ottawa	Ottawa, KS	W 5–0	
November 6	at Warrensburg Normal	Warrensburg, MO	L 5–17	
November 11	at Denver Athletic Club	Denver, CO	L 0–12	
November 30	at Washburn	Topeka, KS	W 12–0	
