= Alonzo Edwin Branch =

American football coach (1874–1925)

Biographical details
- Born: April 30, 1874; Boston, Massachusetts, U.S.
- Died: December 15, 1925 (aged 51); Flushing, New York, U.S.
- Education: Harvard University

Playing career
- 1897–1898: Williams
- Position: Halfback

Coaching career (HC unless noted)
- 1899: Nebraska
- 1900: Miami (OH)

Head coaching record
- Overall: 1–11–1

Alonzo Edwin Branch (April 30, 1874 – December 15, 1925), also known as A. Edwin Branch, was an American college football coach. He served as the head coach at the University of Nebraska in 1899 and at Miami University in Oxford, Ohio in 1900, compiling a career college football record of 1–11–1.

In 1899, Branch led the Nebraska to an exhibition win against Lincoln High School and one victory over Drake. Nebraska had their first losing season under Branch and after the season, he was replaced by Walter C. Booth. Branch's winning percentage of .167 is the lowest of any head coach in the history of the Nebraska Cornhuskers football program.

== Head coaching record ==
Year	Team	Overall	Conference	Standing	Bowl/playoffs
Nebraska Bugeaters (Independent) (1899)
1899	Nebraska	1–7–1			
Nebraska:		1–7–1			
Miami Redskins (Independent) (1900)
1900	Miami	0–4			
Miami:		0–4			
Total:		1–11–1			
