= 1899 Fairmount Wheatshockers football team =

American college football season

1899 Fairmount Wheatshockers football
- Conference: Independent
- Record: 2–1–2
- Head coach: Harry Hess (1st season)
- Home stadium: Fairmount gridiron

1899 Midwestern college football independents records
	Conf.			Overall
Team	W	L	T	W		L		T
Kansas		–		10	–	0	–	0
North Dakota		–		6	–	0	–	0
Detroit College		–		5	–	0	–	0
Lincoln (MO)		–		1	–	0	–	0
Ohio State		–		9	–	0	–	1
Iowa		–		8	–	0	–	1
Washington University		–		5	–	1	–	0
Missouri		–		9	–	2	–	0
Chicago P&S		–		4	–	1	–	0
Mount Union		–		5	–	1	–	1
Indiana		–		6	–	2	–	0
South Dakota Agricultural		–		3	–	1	–	0
Wabash		–		1	–	0	–	1
Cincinnati		–		5	–	2	–	0
Drake		–		5	–	2	–	0
Heidelberg		–		5	–	2	–	0
Buchtel		–		2	–	1	–	0
Doane		–		2	–	1	–	0
Northern Illinois State		–		1	–	0	–	2
Notre Dame		–		6	–	3	–	1
Central Michigan		–		3	–	2	–	0
Fairmount		–		2	–	1	–	2
Carthage		–		3	–	2	–	1
Western Reserve		–		5	–	4	–	0
Wittenberg		–		5	–	4	–	0
Iowa State		–		5	–	4	–	1
College of Emporia		–		1	–	1	–	1
Ohio		–		2	–	2	–	0
Rush Medical		–		3	–	3	–	1
Ohio Wesleyan		–		5	–	5	–	0
Haskell		–		4	–	5	–	0
Lake Forest		–		4	–	6	–	2
Kansas State		–		2	–	3	–	0
Iowa State Normal		–		1	–	3	–	2
Washburn		–		2	–	5	–	2
Butler		–		1	–	3	–	0
Miami (OH)		–		1	–	5	–	0
Nebraska		–		1	–	7	–	1
North Dakota Agricultural		–		0	–	1	–	0
Baldwin–Wallace		–		0	–	4	–	0

The 1899 Fairmount Wheatshockers football team represented Fairmount College—now known as Wichita State University—as an independent during the 1899 college football season. Under first year head coach Harry Hess, the Wheatshockers compiled a record of 2–1–2.

The team initially elected T. H. Morrison, the assistant librarian at Fairmount, as coach and Professor Clark as team manager. Hess was later appointed as the regular coach for team.

== Schedule ==
Date	Time	Opponent	Site	Result	Source
October 9	3:00 p.m.	Sumner County High School	Fairmount gridiron; Wichita, KS	L 0–11	
November 4	2:35 p.m.	at Newton High School	Newton, KS	T 0–0	
November 24		Wichita High School	Wichita, KS	W 7–0	
November 27	3:45 p.m.	at Sumner County High School	Wellington, KS	T 0–0	
November 30	3:45 p.m.	at Newton High School	Newton High School grounds; Newton, KS	W 6–0	
