= 1899 Chicago Physicians and Surgeons football team =

American college football season

1899 Chicago Physicians and Surgeons football
- Conference: Independent
- Record: 3–1–1

1899 Midwestern college football independents records
	Conf.			Overall
Team	W	L	T	W		L		T
Kansas		–		10	–	0	–	0
North Dakota		–		6	–	0	–	0
Detroit College		–		5	–	0	–	0
Lincoln (MO)		–		1	–	0	–	0
Ohio State		–		9	–	0	–	1
Iowa		–		8	–	0	–	1
Washington University		–		5	–	1	–	0
Missouri		–		9	–	2	–	0
Chicago P&S		–		4	–	1	–	0
Mount Union		–		5	–	1	–	1
Indiana		–		6	–	2	–	0
South Dakota Agricultural		–		3	–	1	–	0
Wabash		–		1	–	0	–	1
Cincinnati		–		5	–	2	–	0
Drake		–		5	–	2	–	0
Heidelberg		–		5	–	2	–	0
Buchtel		–		2	–	1	–	0
Doane		–		2	–	1	–	0
Northern Illinois State		–		1	–	0	–	2
Notre Dame		–		6	–	3	–	1
Central Michigan		–		3	–	2	–	0
Fairmount		–		2	–	1	–	2
Carthage		–		3	–	2	–	1
Western Reserve		–		5	–	4	–	0
Wittenberg		–		5	–	4	–	0
Iowa State		–		5	–	4	–	1
College of Emporia		–		1	–	1	–	1
Ohio		–		2	–	2	–	0
Rush Medical		–		3	–	3	–	1
Ohio Wesleyan		–		5	–	5	–	0
Haskell		–		4	–	5	–	0
Lake Forest		–		4	–	6	–	2
Kansas State		–		2	–	3	–	0
Iowa State Normal		–		1	–	3	–	2
Washburn		–		2	–	5	–	2
Butler		–		1	–	3	–	0
Miami (OH)		–		1	–	5	–	0
Nebraska		–		1	–	7	–	1
North Dakota Agricultural		–		0	–	1	–	0
Baldwin–Wallace		–		0	–	4	–	0

The 1899 Chicago Physicians and Surgeons football team was an American football team that represented the College of Physicians and Surgeons of Chicago in the 1899 college football season. The Surgeons compiled a 3–1–1 record, and outscored their opponents 72 to 12. This would be the last winning season in the college's history, as they would amass an abysmal 1–24 record over the next eight seasons until their disbandment in 1908.

== Schedule ==
Date	Opponent	Site	Result	Source
September 30	at Chicago	Marshall Field; Chicago, IL	L 0–12	
October 28	at St. Charles Athletic Club	St. Charles, IL	T 0–0	
November 1	at Lake Forest Academy	Lake Forest, IL	W 38–0	
November 16	Chicago Dental	Chicago, IL	W 29–0	
November 30	at Notre Dame	South Bend, IN	W 5–0	

College Football Data Warehouse lists an additional 46–0 win against Washington College of Maryland; news reports indicate that the College of Physicians and Surgeons of Baltimore beat Washington College 46–0 on November 18.
