= Miami Redskins football, 1888–1899 =

American college football seasons

The Miami Redskins football (now known as Miami RedHawks football) teams from 1888 to 1899 represented Miami University in American football. These were the earliest years of intercollegiate football at the school. Highlights include the following:

- On December 8, 1888, Miami played its first intercollegiate football game against Cincinnati, ending in a scoreless tie. The 1888 game between Cincinnati and Miami was the first in what later became the Victory Bell series that has been contested more than 110 games and is one of the oldest rivalries in college football. It was also the first college football game played in the State of Ohio.
- On November 9, 1889, Miami won its first game, defeating Dayton High School by a 44–0 score. On December 14, 1889, the team also defeated Cincinnati, 34–0, for its first victory in the Victory Bell rivalry. The 1889 team also compiled the first undefeated record in school history with four wins and no losses.
- On November 26, 1891, the team lost to Ohio Wesleyan by a 104–0 score. It was the most one-sided defeat in Miami school history.
- In 1893 and 1895, the team compiled perfect 3–0 records. These were the second and third undefeated seasons in school history.

The team did not have a paid coach from 1888 to 1894. C. K. Fauver became the first head coach in 1895. He was succeeded by Ernest Merrill in 1896, Herbert J. McIntire in 1897, and George Greenleaf in 1899.

The team's most common opponents during this period were the University of Cincinnati (11 games), Earlham College (seven games), and Centre College (three games).

== 1888 ==
1888 Miami Redskins football
- Conference: Independent
- Record: 0–0–1
- Head coach: None
- Home stadium: Old Main lawn

1888 Midwestern college football independents records
	Conf.			Overall
Team	W	L	T	W		L		T
Cincinnati		–		1	–	0	–	1
Notre Dame		–		1	–	0	–	0
Washington University		–		1	–	0	–	0
Michigan		–		2	–	1	–	0
Northwestern		–		2	–	1	–	0
Lake Forest		–		2	–	2	–	0
Minnesota		–		1	–	1	–	0
Indiana		–		0	–	0	–	1
Miami (OH)		–		0	–	0	–	1
Albion		–		0	–	2	–	0

The 1888 Miami Redskins football team was an American football team that represented Miami University during the 1888 college football season. The 1888 team was Miami's first football team to compete in intercollegiate football. The team played only one game, a scoreless tie with the University of Cincinnati football team at Oxford, Ohio, on December 8, 1888.

The players on the first Miami football team included W. Chidlaw, S. Fox, J. Lough, F. McCracken, J. Macready, R. Mason, E. Reed, S. Stephenson, W. Stubbs, and S. Townsend.

=== Schedule ===
Date	Opponent	Site	Result	Source
December 8	Cincinnati	Old Main lawn; Oxford, OH (rivalry)	T 0–0	

== 1889 ==
1889 Miami Redskins football
- Conference: Independent
- Record: 4–0
- Head coach: None

1889 Midwestern college football independents records
	Conf.			Overall
Team	W	L	T	W		L		T
Miami (OH)		–		4	–	0	–	0
Butler		–		2	–	0	–	0
Washington University		–		2	–	0	–	0
Iowa College		–		1	–	0	–	0
Lake Forest		–		1	–	0	–	0
Notre Dame		–		1	–	0	–	0
South Dakota		–		1	–	0	–	1
Minnesota		–		3	–	1	–	0
Purdue		–		2	–	1	–	0
South Dakota Agricultural		–		0	–	0	–	1
Northwestern		–		2	–	2	–	0
Cincinnati		–		1	–	1	–	0
Wabash		–		1	–	1	–	0
Michigan		–		1	–	2	–	0
Indiana		–		0	–	1	–	1
Iowa		–		0	–	1	–	0
Wisconsin		–		0	–	2	–	0

The 1889 Miami Redskins football team was an American football team that represented Miami University during the 1889 college football season. In its second season, Miami went undefeated and had a 4–0 record. There was no paid head coach for the season.

=== Schedule ===
Date	Opponent	Site	Result
November 9	at Dayton High School	Dayton, OH	W 44–0
November ?	at Earlham		W 8–0
December 11	Dayton AC		W 14–4
December 14	Cincinnati	Oxford, OH (rivalry)	W 34–0

== 1890 ==
No team

== 1891 ==
1891 Miami Redskins football
- Conference: Independent
- Record: 1–1
- Head coach: None

1891 Midwestern college football independents records
	Conf.			Overall
Team	W	L	T	W		L		T
Ohio Wesleyan		–		4	–	0	–	0
Kansas		–		7	–	0	–	1
Illinois		–		5	–	1	–	0
Missouri		–		3	–	1	–	0
Lake Forest		–		6	–	2	–	0
Washington University		–		4	–	1	–	1
Minnesota		–		3	–	1	–	1
Wisconsin		–		3	–	1	–	1
Cincinnati		–		4	–	2	–	1
Iowa		–		3	–	2	–	0
Doane		–		2	–	2	–	0
Iowa College		–		1	–	1	–	1
Miami (OH)		–		1	–	1	–	0
Nebraska		–		2	–	2	–	0
Northwestern		–		2	–	2	–	3
Michigan		–		4	–	5	–	0
Ohio State		–		2	–	3	–	0
Case		–		1	–	2	–	0
Buchtel		–		1	–	3	–	0
Washburn		–		1	–	5	–	0
Michigan State Normal		–		0	–	2	–	0

The 1891 Miami Redskins football team was an American football team that represented Miami University during the 1891 college football season. There was no paid head coach for the season. In their second game, they lost 0 to 104 against Ohio Wesleyan.

=== Schedule ===
Date	Opponent	Site	Result
November 21	Hamilton AC		W 38–0
November 26	at Ohio Wesleyan		L 0–104

== 1892 ==
1892 Miami Redskins football
- Conference: Independent
- Record: 2–2
- Head coach: None

1892 Midwestern college football independents records
	Conf.			Overall
Team	W	L	T	W		L		T
Oberlin		–		7	–	0	–	0
Case		–		3	–	0	–	0
Iowa Agricultural		–		1	–	0	–	1
Notre Dame		–		1	–	0	–	1
Chicago		–		8	–	4	–	1
Michigan State Normal		–		2	–	1	–	0
Illinois		–		7	–	4	–	1
Ohio State		–		5	–	3	–	0
Washington University		–		3	–	2	–	0
Hillsdale		–		3	–	2	–	1
Doane		–		1	–	1	–	0
Heidelberg		–		1	–	1	–	0
Miami (OH)		–		2	–	2	–	0
Buchtel		–		3	–	4	–	0
Lake Forest		–		2	–	3	–	0
Cincinnati		–		1	–	2	–	0
Marquette		–		1	–	2	–	0
Ohio Wesleyan		–		1	–	3	–	0
Wittenberg		–		0	–	2	–	1
St. Ignatius College		–		0	–	1	–	0
Washburn		–		0	–	2	–	0
Kalamazoo		–		0	–	2	–	0

The 1892 Miami Redskins football team was an American football team that represented Miami University during the 1892 college football season. There was no paid head coach for the season. They had a 2–2 record in 4 games.

=== Schedule ===
Date	Opponent	Site	Result
October 21	at Earlham		L 0–12
November 11	Hamilton AC		W 28–0
November 19	Cincinnati YMCA		W 8–0
December 2	at Centre		L 6–12

== 1893 ==
1893 Miami Redskins football
- Conference: Independent
- Record: 3–0
- Head coach: None

1893 Midwestern college football independents records
	Conf.			Overall
Team	W	L	T	W		L		T
Case		–		4	–	0	–	0
Miami (OH)		–		3	–	0	–	0
Baker		–		5	–	0	–	1
Oberlin		–		6	–	1	–	0
Hillsdale		–		4	–	1	–	0
Notre Dame		–		4	–	1	–	0
Buchtel		–		5	–	2	–	0
Butler		–		4	–	2	–	0
Michigan State Normal		–		4	–	2	–	0
Chicago		–		6	–	4	–	2
Beloit		–		4	–	3	–	0
Illinois		–		3	–	2	–	3
Lake Forest		–		3	–	2	–	3
Doane		–		2	–	2	–	0
Heidelberg		–		2	–	2	–	0
Kansas State Normal		–		1	–	1	–	0
Wabash		–		3	–	3	–	0
Washburn		–		1	–	1	–	1
Washington University		–		1	–	1	–	0
Ohio State		–		4	–	5	–	0
Wittenberg		–		2	–	3	–	0
Mount Union		–		1	–	2	–	0
Drake		–		0	–	2	–	1
Baldwin–Wallace		–		0	–	1	–	0
College of Emporia		–		0	–	1	–	0
Ohio Wesleyan		–		0	–	1	–	0
Kalamazoo		–		0	–	2	–	0
Iowa Agricultural		–		0	–	3	–	0
Cincinnati		–		0	–	6	–	0

The 1893 Miami Redskins football team was an American football team that represented Miami University during the 1893 college football season. There was no paid head coach for the season. They went undefeated in 3 games.

=== Schedule ===
Date	Opponent	Site	Result	Attendance	Source
October 7	Cincinnati	Oxford, OH (rivalry)	W 24–6		
October 28	Earlham		W 28–6		
November 4	at Cincinnati	East End Grounds; Cincinnati, OH	W 6–0	300	

== 1894 ==
1894 Miami Redskins football
- Conference: Independent
- Record: 1–2
- Head coach: None

1894 Midwestern college football independents records
	Conf.			Overall
Team	W	L	T	W		L		T
Western Reserve		–		7	–	0	–	0
North Dakota Agricultural		–		2	–	0	–	0
Baldwin–Wallace		–		1	–	0	–	0
Buchtel		–		1	–	0	–	0
Michigan		–		9	–	1	–	1
Iowa Agricultural		–		5	–	1	–	0
College Of Emporia		–		4	–	1	–	0
Minnesota		–		3	–	1	–	0
Washburn		–		3	–	1	–	0
Wittenberg		–		6	–	2	–	0
Doane		–		5	–	2	–	0
Wisconsin		–		5	–	2	–	0
Notre Dame		–		3	–	1	–	1
Beloit		–		6	–	3	–	0
Washington University		–		2	–	1	–	0
Chicago		–		14	–	7	–	1
Kalamazoo		–		2	–	1	–	1
Ohio State		–		6	–	5	–	0
Case		–		4	–	3	–	0
Illinois		–		4	–	3	–	0
Oberlin		–		4	–	3	–	1
Cincinnati		–		3	–	3	–	0
Drake		–		2	–	2	–	0
Mount Union		–		4	–	5	–	0
Lake Forest		–		3	–	4	–	0
Miami (OH)		–		1	–	2	–	0
Ohio Wesleyan		–		1	–	3	–	0
Rush Medical		–		3	–	6	–	0
Northwestern		–		1	–	5	–	0
Ohio		–		0	–	1	–	0
South Dakota		–		0	–	2	–	0

The 1894 Miami Redskins football team was an American football team that represented Miami University during the 1894 college football season. There was no paid head coach for the season. They played in 3 games and had a 1–2 record.

=== Schedule ===
Date	Opponent	Site	Result	Source
October 13	at Kentucky State College	Lexington, KY	L 6–28	
October 14	at Hamilton AC		W 18–0	
October 20	at Cincinnati	Cincinnati, OH (rivalry)	L 0–6	

== 1895 ==
1895 Miami Redskins football
- Conference: Independent
- Record: 3–0
- Head coach: C. K. Fauver

1895 Midwestern college football independents records
	Conf.			Overall
Team	W	L	T	W		L		T
Miami (OH)		–		3	–	0	–	0
Carthage		–		2	–	0	–	0
Washington University		–		2	–	0	–	0
Michigan		–		8	–	1	–	0
Chicago		–		10	–	3	–	0
Wittenberg		–		5	–	2	–	0
Minnesota		–		7	–	3	–	0
Wisconsin		–		5	–	2	–	1
Wabash		–		6	–	3	–	0
Baldwin–Wallace		–		3	–	1	–	0
Notre Dame		–		3	–	1	–	0
Illinois		–		4	–	2	–	1
Buchtel		–		3	–	2	–	0
College of Emporia		–		3	–	2	–	0
Doane		–		3	–	2	–	0
Chicago P&S		–		3	–	2	–	1
Purdue		–		4	–	3	–	0
Indiana		–		4	–	3	–	1
Northwestern		–		6	–	5	–	0
Butler		–		2	–	2	–	0
Cincinnati		–		3	–	3	–	0
Kalamazoo		–		1	–	1	–	0
Michigan State Normal		–		3	–	3	–	0
North Dakota Agricultural		–		1	–	1	–	0
North Dakota		–		1	–	1	–	0
Ohio State		–		4	–	4	–	2
Iowa Agricultural		–		3	–	4	–	0
Ohio		–		2	–	3	–	0
Rush-Lake Forest		–		4	–	6	–	0
Ohio Wesleyan		–		2	–	4	–	1
Haskell		–		1	–	2	–	0
Iowa State Normal		–		1	–	2	–	0
Lake Forest		–		1	–	2	–	0
Northwestern Law		–		1	–	2	–	0
Drake		–		1	–	4	–	0

The 1895 Miami Redskins football team was an American football team that represented Miami University during the 1895 college football season. In their first season with a head coach, they went undefeated with a 3–0 record. Their coach was C. K. Fauver.

=== Schedule ===
Date	Opponent	Site	Result	Source
October 12	at Wittenberg	Springfield, OH	W 12–4	
November 9	Butler		W 6–0	
November 16	at Cincinnati	League Park; Cincinnati, OH (rivalry)	W 12–0	

== 1896 ==
1896 Miami Redskins football
- Conference: Independent
- Record: 3–1
- Head coach: Ernest Merrill (1st season)
- Home stadium: Miami Field

1896 Midwestern college football independents records
	Conf.			Overall
Team	W	L	T	W		L		T
Carthage		–		4	–	0	–	0
St. Ignatius College Chicago		–		1	–	0	–	0
Washburn		–		6	–	1	–	1
Iowa Agricultural		–		8	–	2	–	0
Central Michigan		–		3	–	1	–	0
Miami (OH)		–		3	–	1	–	0
Ohio Wesleyan		–		6	–	2	–	0
Detroit College		–		5	–	2	–	0
North Dakota Agricultural		–		3	–	1	–	1
Heidelberg		–		2	–	1	–	0
Ohio		–		4	–	2	–	1
Indiana		–		5	–	3	–	0
Beloit		–		2	–	1	–	3
Butler		–		4	–	3	–	0
Iowa State Normal		–		4	–	3	–	0
Notre Dame		–		4	–	3	–	0
Cincinnati		–		4	–	3	–	1
Wittenberg		–		5	–	4	–	0
Baldwin–Wallace		–		2	–	2	–	0
College of Emporia		–		2	–	3	–	0
Ohio State		–		5	–	5	–	1
Lake Forest		–		3	–	4	–	1
Mount Union		–		3	–	4	–	1
Wabash		–		3	–	4	–	0
Drake		–		2	–	3	–	0
Chicago P&S		–		2	–	4	–	2
Hillsdale		–		2	–	4	–	0
Kansas State		–		0	–	1	–	1
Indiana State Normal		–		0	–	1	–	0
Buchtel		–		0	–	1	–	0
Washington University		–		0	–	2	–	0
Doane		–		0	–	5	–	0
Haskell		–		0	–	5	–	0

The 1896 Miami Redskins football team was an American football team that represented Miami University during the 1896 college football season. Their coach was Ernest Merrill.

=== Schedule ===
Date	Opponent	Site	Result
October 2	at Cincinnati	Union Ball Park; Cincinnati, OH (rivalry)	W 6–4
October 15	at Dayton		W 10–0
October 17	Earlham	Miami Field; Oxford, OH	W 26–0
November 7	Butler	Miami Field; Oxford, OH	L 4–16

== 1897 ==
1897 Miami Redskins football
- Conference: Independent
- Record: 2–4–1
- Head coach: Herbert J. McIntire (1st season)
- Home stadium: Athletic Park

1897 Midwestern college football independents records
	Conf.			Overall
Team	W	L	T	W		L		T
Butler		–		3	–	0	–	0
Fairmount		–		1	–	0	–	0
Washburn		–		7	–	1	–	0
Cincinnati		–		9	–	1	–	1
Iowa State Normal		–		5	–	1	–	0
Ohio Wesleyan		–		7	–	1	–	1
Indiana		–		6	–	1	–	1
Ohio		–		7	–	2	–	0
Carthage		–		3	–	1	–	0
Iowa Agricultural		–		3	–	1	–	0
Notre Dame		–		4	–	1	–	1
Central Michigan		–		2	–	1	–	0
Baldwin–Wallace		–		2	–	1	–	1
Chicago Dental Infirmary		–		2	–	2	–	1
Lake Forest		–		4	–	5	–	1
Drake		–		2	–	3	–	0
Heidelberg		–		2	–	3	–	0
Detroit College		–		1	–	2	–	0
Indiana Normal		–		1	–	4	–	0
Kansas State		–		1	–	2	–	1
Mount Union		–		2	–	4	–	1
Rush Medical College		–		1	–	4	–	1
DePauw		–		2	–	6	–	0
Wittenberg		–		2	–	6	–	0
Haskell		–		1	–	4	–	0
Indiana State Normal		–		1	–	4	–	0
Ohio State		–		1	–	7	–	1
Lincoln (MO)		–		0	–	1	–	0
South Dakota Agricultural		–		0	–	1	–	0
Washington University		–		0	–	2	–	0
North Dakota Agricultural		–		0	–	3	–	0

The 1897 Miami Redskins football team was an American football team that represented Miami University during the 1897 college football season. Under new head coach Herbert J. McIntire, Miami compiled a 2–4–1 record.

=== Schedule ===
Date	Time	Opponent	Site	Result	Source
October 2		Dayton AC	Athletic Park; Oxford, OH	T 0–0	
October 9	2:30 p.m.	Cincinnati	Athletic Park; Oxford, OH (rivalry)	L 0–6	
October 17		at Earlham		W 10–0	
October 23		Centennial Guards	Athletic Park; Oxford, OH	W 10–0	
October 30		at Cincinnati	League Park; Cincinnati, OH	L 6–10	
November 16		at Indiana	Athletic Field; Bloomington, IN	L 6–22	
November 25		at Centre		L 0–18	

== 1898 ==
1898 Miami Redskins football
- Conference: Independent
- Record: 1–1
- Head coach: None
- Home stadium: Miami Field

1898 Midwestern college football independents records
	Conf.			Overall
Team	W	L	T	W		L		T
Washington University		–		6	–	0	–	0
Detroit College		–		5	–	0	–	0
Carthage		–		3	–	0	–	0
Lincoln (MO)		–		1	–	0	–	0
Iowa State Normal		–		4	–	0	–	1
Washburn		–		4	–	0	–	1
Kansas		–		7	–	1	–	0
Cincinnati		–		6	–	1	–	2
Indiana		–		4	–	1	–	2
Nebraska		–		8	–	3	–	0
Drake		–		4	–	2	–	0
Lake Forest		–		2	–	1	–	0
Notre Dame		–		4	–	2	–	0
Western Reserve		–		5	–	3	–	0
Butler		–		2	–	1	–	1
Heidelberg		–		4	–	3	–	0
Michigan Agricultural		–		4	–	3	–	0
Iowa State		–		3	–	2	–	0
Kansas State		–		1	–	1	–	2
Miami (OH)		–		1	–	1	–	0
South Dakota Agricultural		–		1	–	1	–	1
DePauw		–		3	–	4	–	2
Iowa		–		3	–	4	–	2
Ohio State		–		3	–	5	–	0
Baldwin–Wallace		–		2	–	4	–	0
Central Michigan		–		1	–	2	–	0
Indiana State Normal		–		1	–	2	–	0
North Dakota Agricultural		–		1	–	2	–	0
Wabash		–		2	–	5	–	1
Ohio Wesleyan		–		2	–	5	–	0
Ohio		–		1	–	3	–	0
Haskell		–		2	–	7	–	0
Missouri		–		1	–	4	–	1
Wittenberg		–		1	–	5	–	1
Fairmount		–		0	–	1	–	0
College of Emporia		–		0	–	2	–	0

The 1898 Miami Redskins football team was an American football team that represented Miami University during the 1898 college football season.

=== Schedule ===
Date	Opponent	Site	Result	Source
October 8	Cincinnati	Oxford, OH (Victory Bell)	L 0–22	
November 12	Dayton High School		W 6–11	

== 1899 ==
1899 Miami Redskins football
- Conference: Independent
- Record: 1–5
- Head coach: George Greenleaf (1st season)
- Home stadium: Miami Field

1899 Midwestern college football independents records
	Conf.			Overall
Team	W	L	T	W		L		T
Kansas		–		10	–	0	–	0
North Dakota		–		6	–	0	–	0
Detroit College		–		5	–	0	–	0
Lincoln (MO)		–		1	–	0	–	0
Ohio State		–		9	–	0	–	1
Iowa		–		8	–	0	–	1
Washington University		–		5	–	1	–	0
Missouri		–		9	–	2	–	0
Chicago P&S		–		4	–	1	–	0
Mount Union		–		5	–	1	–	1
Indiana		–		6	–	2	–	0
South Dakota Agricultural		–		3	–	1	–	0
Wabash		–		1	–	0	–	1
Cincinnati		–		5	–	2	–	0
Drake		–		5	–	2	–	0
Heidelberg		–		5	–	2	–	0
Buchtel		–		2	–	1	–	0
Doane		–		2	–	1	–	0
Northern Illinois State		–		1	–	0	–	2
Notre Dame		–		6	–	3	–	1
Central Michigan		–		3	–	2	–	0
Fairmount		–		2	–	1	–	2
Carthage		–		3	–	2	–	1
Western Reserve		–		5	–	4	–	0
Wittenberg		–		5	–	4	–	0
Iowa State		–		5	–	4	–	1
College of Emporia		–		1	–	1	–	1
Ohio		–		2	–	2	–	0
Rush Medical		–		3	–	3	–	1
Ohio Wesleyan		–		5	–	5	–	0
Haskell		–		4	–	5	–	0
Lake Forest		–		4	–	6	–	2
Kansas State		–		2	–	3	–	0
Iowa State Normal		–		1	–	3	–	2
Washburn		–		2	–	5	–	2
Butler		–		1	–	3	–	0
Miami (OH)		–		1	–	5	–	0
Nebraska		–		1	–	7	–	1
North Dakota Agricultural		–		0	–	1	–	0
Baldwin–Wallace		–		0	–	4	–	0

The 1899 Miami Redskins football team was an American football team that represented Miami University during the 1899 college football season. Under new head coach George Greenleaf, Miami compiled a 1–5 record.

=== Schedule ===
Date	Time	Opponent	Site	Result	Source
October 7	2:50 p.m.	at Cincinnati	Chester Park; Cincinnati, OH (Victory Bell)	L 0–21	
October 13		at Vanderbilt	Dudley Field; Nashville, TN	L 0–12	
October 16		at Centre	Danville, KY	L 12–15	
October 18		at Kentucky State College	Lexington, KY	L 5–18	
October 28		Wittenberg	Miami Field; Oxford, OH	W 6–0	
November 18		at Earlham	Earlham Field?; Richmond, IN	L 0–28	
