= 1899 Missouri Tigers football team =

American college football season

1899 Missouri Tigers football
- Conference: Independent
- Record: 9–2
- Head coach: Dave Fultz (2nd season)
- Captain: John Kramer
- Home stadium: Rollins Field

1899 Midwestern college football independents records
	Conf.			Overall
Team	W	L	T	W		L		T
Kansas		–		10	–	0	–	0
North Dakota		–		6	–	0	–	0
Detroit College		–		5	–	0	–	0
Lincoln (MO)		–		1	–	0	–	0
Ohio State		–		9	–	0	–	1
Iowa		–		8	–	0	–	1
Washington University		–		5	–	1	–	0
Missouri		–		9	–	2	–	0
Chicago P&S		–		4	–	1	–	0
Mount Union		–		5	–	1	–	1
Indiana		–		6	–	2	–	0
South Dakota Agricultural		–		3	–	1	–	0
Wabash		–		1	–	0	–	1
Cincinnati		–		5	–	2	–	0
Drake		–		5	–	2	–	0
Heidelberg		–		5	–	2	–	0
Buchtel		–		2	–	1	–	0
Doane		–		2	–	1	–	0
Northern Illinois State		–		1	–	0	–	2
Notre Dame		–		6	–	3	–	1
Central Michigan		–		3	–	2	–	0
Fairmount		–		2	–	1	–	2
Carthage		–		3	–	2	–	1
Western Reserve		–		5	–	4	–	0
Wittenberg		–		5	–	4	–	0
Iowa State		–		5	–	4	–	1
College of Emporia		–		1	–	1	–	1
Ohio		–		2	–	2	–	0
Ohio Wesleyan		–		5	–	5	–	0
Haskell		–		4	–	5	–	0
Lake Forest		–		4	–	6	–	2
Rush Medical		–		3	–	4	–	0
Kansas State		–		2	–	3	–	0
Iowa State Normal		–		1	–	3	–	2
Washburn		–		2	–	5	–	2
Butler		–		1	–	3	–	0
Miami (OH)		–		1	–	5	–	0
Nebraska		–		1	–	7	–	1
North Dakota Agricultural		–		0	–	1	–	0
Baldwin–Wallace		–		0	–	4	–	0

The 1899 Missouri Tigers football team was an American football team that represented the University of Missouri as an independent during the 1899 college football season. The team compiled a 9–2 record and outscored its opponents by a combined total of 242 to 56. Dave Fultz was the head coach for the second of two seasons. The team played its home games at Rollins Field in Columbia, Missouri.

== Schedule ==
Date	Time	Opponent	Site	Result	Attendance	Source
October 1		Warrensburg Teachers	Rollins Field; Columbia, MO	W 21–0		
October 9		Wentworth Military	Rollins Field; Columbia, MO	W 45–0		
October 14		Haskell	Rollins Field; Columbia, MO	W 17–0		
October 21		Nebraska	Antelope Field; Lincoln, NE (rivalry)	W 11–0		
October 23		at Tarkio	College Field; Tarkio, MO	W 23–0		
October 24		at Amity	College Grounds; College Springs, IA	W 8–0		
October 28		at Christian Brothers (MO)	CBC campus; St. Louis, MO	W 29–0		
November 4		at Drake	YMCA Park; Des Moines, IA	L 0–11		
November 11		Missouri Valley	Rollins Field; Columbia, MO	W 39–0		
November 18	2:30 p.m.	at Washington University	Athletic Park; St. Louis, MO	W 33–11		
November 30		vs. Kansas	Exposition Park; Kansas City, MO (rivalry)	L 0–12	8,000	
