= 1899 Cincinnati football team =

American college football season

1899 Cincinnati football
- Conference: Independent
- Record: 5–2
- Head coach: Daniel A. Reed (1st season)
- Captain: Howard Nieman
- Home stadium: Chester Park

1899 Midwestern college football independents records
	Conf.			Overall
Team	W	L	T	W		L		T
Kansas		–		10	–	0	–	0
North Dakota		–		6	–	0	–	0
Detroit College		–		5	–	0	–	0
Lincoln (MO)		–		1	–	0	–	0
Ohio State		–		9	–	0	–	1
Iowa		–		8	–	0	–	1
Washington University		–		5	–	1	–	0
Missouri		–		9	–	2	–	0
Chicago P&S		–		4	–	1	–	0
Mount Union		–		5	–	1	–	1
Indiana		–		6	–	2	–	0
South Dakota Agricultural		–		3	–	1	–	0
Wabash		–		1	–	0	–	1
Cincinnati		–		5	–	2	–	0
Drake		–		5	–	2	–	0
Heidelberg		–		5	–	2	–	0
Buchtel		–		2	–	1	–	0
Doane		–		2	–	1	–	0
Northern Illinois State		–		1	–	0	–	2
Notre Dame		–		6	–	3	–	1
Central Michigan		–		3	–	2	–	0
Fairmount		–		2	–	1	–	2
Carthage		–		3	–	2	–	1
Western Reserve		–		5	–	4	–	0
Wittenberg		–		5	–	4	–	0
Iowa State		–		5	–	4	–	1
College of Emporia		–		1	–	1	–	1
Ohio		–		2	–	2	–	0
Rush Medical		–		3	–	3	–	1
Ohio Wesleyan		–		5	–	5	–	0
Haskell		–		4	–	5	–	0
Lake Forest		–		4	–	6	–	2
Kansas State		–		2	–	3	–	0
Iowa State Normal		–		1	–	3	–	2
Washburn		–		2	–	5	–	2
Butler		–		1	–	3	–	0
Miami (OH)		–		1	–	5	–	0
Nebraska		–		1	–	7	–	1
North Dakota Agricultural		–		0	–	1	–	0
Baldwin–Wallace		–		0	–	4	–	0

The 1899 Cincinnati football team was an American football team that represented the University of Cincinnati as an independent during the 1899 college football season. Led by first-year head coach Daniel A. Reed, the team compiled a record of 5–2. Howard Nieman served as the team captain. Cincinnati played its home games at Chester Park in Cincinnati.

== Schedule ==
Date	Time	Opponent	Site	Result	Attendance	Source
October 7	2:50 p.m.	Miami (OH)	Chester Park; Cincinnati, OH (Victory Bell)	W 21–0		
October 21	3:30 p.m.	at Vanderbilt	Dudley Field; Nashville, TN	W 6–0	1,000	
October 28		Centre	Chester Park; Cincinnati, OH	W 26–0		
November 4		at Indiana	Jordan Field; Bloomington, IN	L 0–35		
November 11	3:20 p.m.	at Washington & Jefferson	College Park; Washington, PA	L 0–20		
November 18		Alumni	Chester Park; Cincinnati, OH	W 6–0		
November 30	3:00 p.m.	Ohio Wesleyan	Chester Park; Cincinnati, OH	W 22–5	2,000–2,500	
