= 1899 Notre Dame football team =

American college football season

1899 Notre Dame football
- Conference: Independent
- Record: 6–3–1
- Head coach: James McWeeney (1st season)
- Captain: Jack Mullen
- Home stadium: Cartier Field, Brownson Hall field

1899 Midwestern college football independents records
	Conf.			Overall
Team	W	L	T	W		L		T
Kansas		–		10	–	0	–	0
North Dakota		–		6	–	0	–	0
Detroit College		–		5	–	0	–	0
Lincoln (MO)		–		1	–	0	–	0
Ohio State		–		9	–	0	–	1
Iowa		–		8	–	0	–	1
Washington University		–		5	–	1	–	0
Missouri		–		9	–	2	–	0
Chicago P&S		–		4	–	1	–	0
Mount Union		–		5	–	1	–	1
Indiana		–		6	–	2	–	0
South Dakota Agricultural		–		3	–	1	–	0
Wabash		–		1	–	0	–	1
Cincinnati		–		5	–	2	–	0
Drake		–		5	–	2	–	0
Heidelberg		–		5	–	2	–	0
Buchtel		–		2	–	1	–	0
Doane		–		2	–	1	–	0
Northern Illinois State		–		1	–	0	–	2
Notre Dame		–		6	–	3	–	1
Central Michigan		–		3	–	2	–	0
Fairmount		–		2	–	1	–	2
Carthage		–		3	–	2	–	1
Western Reserve		–		5	–	4	–	0
Wittenberg		–		5	–	4	–	0
Iowa State		–		5	–	4	–	1
College of Emporia		–		1	–	1	–	1
Ohio		–		2	–	2	–	0
Rush Medical		–		3	–	3	–	1
Ohio Wesleyan		–		5	–	5	–	0
Haskell		–		4	–	5	–	0
Lake Forest		–		4	–	6	–	2
Kansas State		–		2	–	3	–	0
Iowa State Normal		–		1	–	3	–	2
Washburn		–		2	–	5	–	2
Butler		–		1	–	3	–	0
Miami (OH)		–		1	–	5	–	0
Nebraska		–		1	–	7	–	1
North Dakota Agricultural		–		0	–	1	–	0
Baldwin–Wallace		–		0	–	4	–	0

The 1899 Notre Dame football team was an American football team that represented the University of Notre Dame in the 1899 college football season. In their first season with James McWeeney as coach, the team compiled a 6–3–1 record, shut out five opponents, and outscored all opponents by a total of 169 to 55.

== Schedule ==
Date	Time	Opponent	Site	Result	Attendance	Source
September 27		Englewood High School	Cartier Field; Notre Dame, IN	W 29–5	600+	
September 30		Michigan Agricultural	Cartier Field; Notre Dame, IN (rivalry)	W 40–0		
October 4		at Chicago	Marshall Field; Chicago, IL	L 6–23		
October 14		Lake Forest	Cartier Field; Notre Dame, IN	W 38–0		
October 18		at Michigan	Regents Field; Ann Arbor, MI (rivalry)	L 0–12		
October 23		Indiana	Cartier Field; Notre Dame, IN	W 17–0	800+	
October 27	3:00 p.m.	Northwestern	Brownson Hall field; Notre Dame, IN (rivalry)	W 12–0		
November 4		Rush Medical	Cartier Field; Notre Dame, IN	W 17–0		
November 18		at Purdue	Stuart Field; West Lafayette, IN (rivalry)	T 10–10	1,400	
November 30		Chicago Physicians and Surgeons	Cartier Field; Notre Dame, IN	L 0–5	2,000	
