= List of Akron Zips head football coaches =

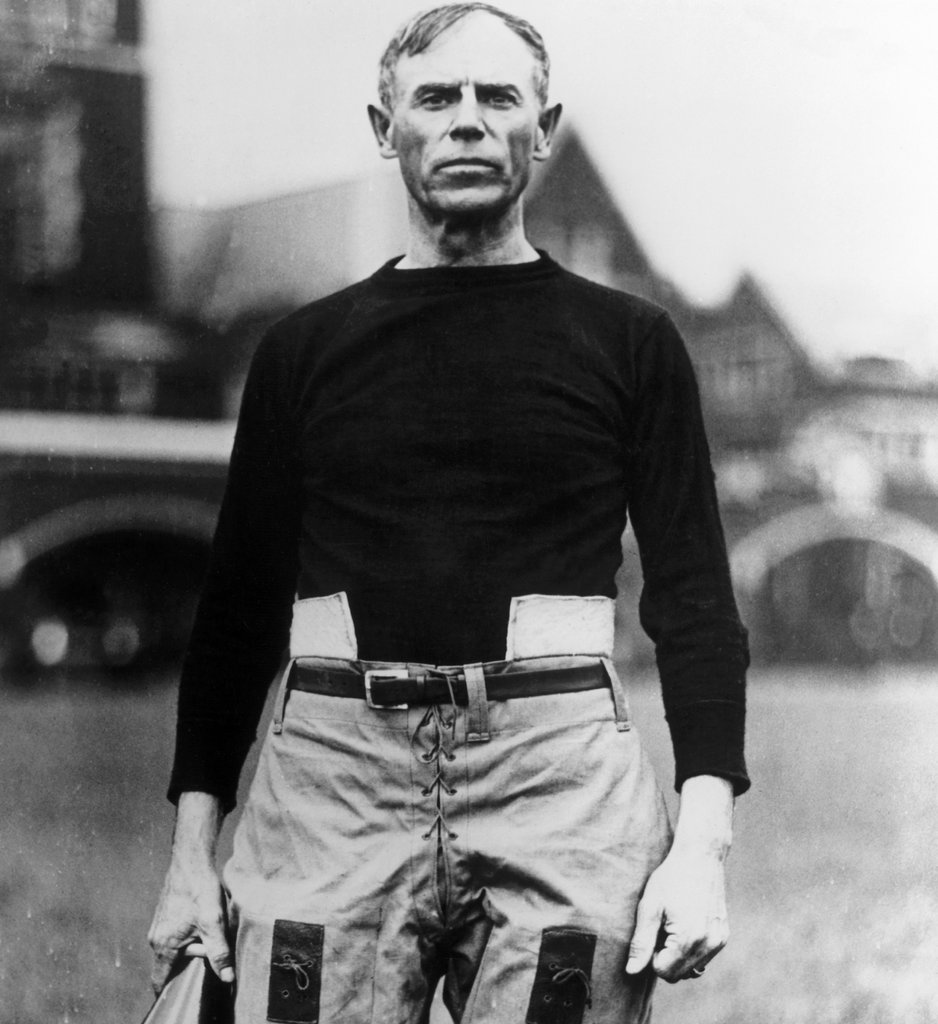
John Heisman, namesake of the Heisman Trophy award, led Buchtel College to a 6–2 record in 1893–94.

The Akron Zips football program is a college football team that represents the University of Akron (formerly known as Buchtel College). The team has had 27 head coaches since it began playing organized football in 1891. Among those coaches, only Gordon K. Larson, Jim Dennison, J.D. Brookhart, and Terry Bowden have led Akron to postseason appearances. Brookhart is the only coach to win a conference championship with the Zips; he won the Mid-American Conference in 2005. Dennison is the school's all-time leader in games won and seasons coached.

== Key ==
Key to symbols in coaches list
General		Overall		Conference		Postseason (Note: Although the first Rose Bowl Game was played in 1902, it has been continuously played since the 1916 game, and is recognized as the oldest bowl game by the NCAA. "—" indicates any season prior to 1916 when postseason games were not played.)	
No.	Order of coaches (Note: A running total of the number of head coaches, with coaches who served separate tenures being counted only once. Interim head coaches are represented with "Int" and are not counted in the running total. "—" indicates the team played but either without a coach or no coach is on record. "X" indicates an interim year without play.)	GC	Games coached	CW	Conference wins	PW	Postseason wins
DC	Division championships	OW	Overall wins	CL	Conference losses	PL	Postseason losses
CC	Conference championships	OL	Overall losses	CT	Conference ties	PT	Postseason ties
NC	National championships	OT	Overall ties (Note: Overtime rules in college football were introduced in 1996, making ties impossible in the period since.)	C%	Conference winning percentage		
†	Elected to the College Football Hall of Fame	O%	Overall winning percentage (Note: When computing the win–loss percentage, a tie counts as half a win and half a loss.)				

== Coaches ==
List of head football coaches showing season(s) coached, overall records, conference records, postseason records, championships and selected awards (Note: Statistics correct as of the end of the 2025 NCAA Division I FBS football season.)
No.	Name	Season(s)	GC	OW	OL	OT	O%	CW	CL	CT	C%	PW	PL	PT	DC	CC	NC	Awards
N/A	No coach (Note: College Football Data Warehouse lists an additional loss in 1891, a forfeit to Denison due to inclement weather, that is not included in the University of Akron's records.)	1891	4	1	3	0	0.250	—	—	—	—	—	—	—	—	—	0	—
1	Frank Cook	1892	7	3	4	0	0.429	—	—	—	—	—	—	—	—	—	0	—
2	John Heisman^{†}	1893–94	8	6	2	0	0.750	—	—	—	—	—	—	—	—	—	0	—
N/A	No coach	1895	5	3	2	0	0.600	—	—	—	—	—	—	—	—	—	0	—
3	Harry Wilson	1896	1	0	1	0	.000	—	—	—	—	—	—	—	—	—	0	—
X	No team (Note: The absence of football teams in 1897–98, 1901, and 1904–07 has sometimes been attributed to a general lack of interest in athletics at Butchel following John Heisman's departure as coach and athletic director in 1894. Support for the program was considered to be contingent on the hiring of a head coach for the season. This problem also affected the school's baseball team, which did not participate in 1896, 1898, or 1900.)	1897–98	—	—	—	—	—	—	—	—	—	—	—	—	—	—	—	—
4	Archie Eves	1899	3	2	1	0	0.667	—	—	—	—	—	—	—	—	—	0	—
N/A	No coach	1900	6	2	3	1	0.417	—	—	—	—	—	—	—	—	—	0	—
X	No team	1901	—	—	—	—	—	—	—	—	—	—	—	—	—	—	—	—
5	Forest Firestone	1902	7	2	5	0	0.286	—	—	—	—	—	—	—	—	—	0	—
6	Alfred W. Place (Note: College Football Data Warehouse credits an 11-0 victory over Ohio Northern to Place's team that is not recorded in the University of Akron's records.)	1903	2	0	2	0	.000	—	—	—	—	—	—	—	—	—	0	—
X	No team	1904–07	—	—	—	—	—	—	—	—	—	—	—	—	—	—	—	—
7	Dwight Bradley	1908	7	3	4	0	0.429	—	—	—	—	—	—	—	—	—	0	—
8	Clarence Weed	1909	8	4	4	0	0.500	—	—	—	—	—	—	—	—	—	0	—
9	Frank Haggerty	1910–14	41	22	16	3	0.573	—	—	—	—	—	—	—	—	—	0	—
10	Fred Sefton	1915–23	71	34	33	4	0.507	25	27	3	0.482	0	0	0	—	0	0	—
11	James W. Coleman	1924–25	16	6	10	0	0.375	4	8	0	0.333	0	0	0	—	0	0	—
12	George Babcock	1926	9	5	2	2	0.667	4	2	2	0.625	0	0	0	—	0	0	—
13	Red Blair	1927–35	78	43	30	5	0.583	34	28	4	0.545	0	0	0	—	0	0	—
14	Jim Aiken	1936–38	27	19	7	1	0.722	5	1	1	0.786	0	0	0	—	—	0	—
15	Thomas Dowler	1939–40	18	7	9	2	0.444	—	—	—	—	0	0	0	—	—	0	—
16	Otis Douglas	1941–42	18	5	10	3	0.361	—	—	—	—	0	0	0	—	—	0	—
X	No team (Note: The University of Akron suspended the football program from 1943 to 1945 due to World War II.)	1943–45	—	—	—	—	—	—	—	—	—	—	—	—	—	—	—	—
17	Paul Baldacci	1946–47	17	7	10	0	0.412	—	—	—	—	0	0	0	—	—	0	—
18	William Houghton	1948–51	35	7	27	1	0.214	3	13	1	0.206	0	0	0	—	0	0	—
19	Kenneth Cochrane	1952–53	18	8	9	1	0.472	6	4	1	0.591	0	0	0	—	0	0	—
20	Joe McMullen	1954–60	61	30	28	3	0.516	28	23	2	0.547	0	0	0	—	0	0	—
21	Gordon K. Larson	1961–72	112	74	33	5	0.683	26	8	0	0.765	0	1	0	—	0	0	—
22	Jim Dennison	1973–85	144	80	62	2	0.563	30	22	1	0.637	2	2	0	—	0	0	AFCA College Division Coach of the Year (1976); Ohio Valley Conference Coach of the Year (1982)
23	Gerry Faust	1986–94	99	43	53	3	0.449	14	18	0	0.438	0	0	0	—	0	0	—
24	Lee Owens	1995–2003	101	40	61	0	0.396	31	39	0	0.443	0	0	0	1	0	0	—
25	J. D. Brookhart	2004–09	72	30	42	–	0.417	22	26	–	0.458	0	1	–	1	1	0	MAC Coach of the Year (2004)
26	Rob Ianello	2010–11	24	2	22	–	0.083	1	15	–	0.063	0	0	–	0	0	0	—
27	Terry Bowden	2012–2018	87	35	52	–	0.402	23	33	–	0.411	1	1	–	1	0	0	—
28	Tom Arth	2019–2021	27	3	24	–	0.111	2	17	–	0.105	0	0	–	0	0	0	—
Int	Oscar Rodriguez (Note: Oscar Rodriguez was named interim for the final three games of the 2021 season after Tom Arth was fired on November 4, 2021.)	2021	3	0	3	—	.000	0	3	—	.000	0	0	—	0	0	0	—
29	Joe Moorhead	2022–	48	13	35	–	0.271	9	23	–	0.281	0	0	–	0	0	0	—
