= Arthur N. Sager =

American football player, coach, and lawyer

Biographical details
- Born: October 2, 1871; Kenosha, Wisconsin, U.S.
- Died: October 17, 1949 (aged 78); Louisville, Kentucky, U.S.
- Education: DePauw (Law 1893)

Coaching career (HC unless noted)
- 1892–1893: DePauw
- 1899: Washington University

Head coaching record
- Overall: 13–8

Arthur Noble Sager (October 2, 1871 – October 17, 1949) was an American lawyer and college football coach. He served as the head football coach at DePauw University in Greencastle, Indiana from 1892 to 1893, where he was a law student. Sager moved to St. Louis, Missouri in 1896 to become a lawyer. There, he also served as the head football coach at Washington University in St. Louis in 1899.

== Head coaching record ==
Year	Team	Overall	Conference	Standing	Bowl/playoffs
DePauw (Independent) (1892–1893)
1892	DePauw	2–4			
1893	DePauw	6–3			
DePauw:		8–7			
Washington University (Independent) (1899)
1899	Washington University	5–1			
Washington University:		5–1			
Total:		13–8			
