= 1899 Drake Bulldogs football team =

American college football season

1899 Drake Bulldogs football
- Conference: Independent
- Record: 5–2
- Head coach: A. B. Potter (3rd season)

1899 Midwestern college football independents records
	Conf.			Overall
Team	W	L	T	W		L		T
Kansas		–		10	–	0	–	0
North Dakota		–		6	–	0	–	0
Detroit College		–		5	–	0	–	0
Lincoln (MO)		–		1	–	0	–	0
Ohio State		–		9	–	0	–	1
Iowa		–		8	–	0	–	1
Washington University		–		5	–	1	–	0
Missouri		–		9	–	2	–	0
Chicago P&S		–		4	–	1	–	0
Mount Union		–		5	–	1	–	1
Indiana		–		6	–	2	–	0
South Dakota Agricultural		–		3	–	1	–	0
Wabash		–		1	–	0	–	1
Cincinnati		–		5	–	2	–	0
Drake		–		5	–	2	–	0
Heidelberg		–		5	–	2	–	0
Buchtel		–		2	–	1	–	0
Doane		–		2	–	1	–	0
Northern Illinois State		–		1	–	0	–	2
Notre Dame		–		6	–	3	–	1
Central Michigan		–		3	–	2	–	0
Fairmount		–		2	–	1	–	2
Carthage		–		3	–	2	–	1
Western Reserve		–		5	–	4	–	0
Wittenberg		–		5	–	4	–	0
Iowa State		–		5	–	4	–	1
College of Emporia		–		1	–	1	–	1
Ohio		–		2	–	2	–	0
Rush Medical		–		3	–	3	–	1
Ohio Wesleyan		–		5	–	5	–	0
Haskell		–		4	–	5	–	0
Lake Forest		–		4	–	6	–	2
Kansas State		–		2	–	3	–	0
Iowa State Normal		–		1	–	3	–	2
Washburn		–		2	–	5	–	2
Butler		–		1	–	3	–	0
Miami (OH)		–		1	–	5	–	0
Nebraska		–		1	–	7	–	1
North Dakota Agricultural		–		0	–	1	–	0
Baldwin–Wallace		–		0	–	4	–	0

The 1899 Drake Bulldogs football team was an American football team that represented Drake University as an independent during the 1899 college football season. In its third and final season under head coach A. B. Potter, the team compiled a 5–2 record and outscored opponents by a total of 112 to 57.

== Schedule ==
Date	Opponent	Site	Result	Source
October 7	Lenox	Des Moines, IA	W 48–5	
October 14	at Cornell (IA)	Mount Vernon, IA	W 6–0	
October 21	at Kansas	McCook Field; Lawrence, KS	L 6–29	
November 4	Missouri	Des Moines, IA	W 11–0	
November 11	Nebraska	Des Moines, IA	L 6-12	
November 25	at Grinnell	Grinnell, IA	W 18–6	
December 1	at Penn (IA)	Oskaloosa, IA	W 17–5	
