= Fred Sullivan (American football) =

American football coach

Biographical details
- Born: Warwick, New York, U.S.
- Education: Ohio (Ph.B., 1903)

Coaching career (HC unless noted)
- 1899: Ohio
- 1903: Ohio

Head coaching record
- Overall: 4–6

Fred Taylor Sullivan was an American college football coach. He served as the head football coach at Ohio University in 1899 and again in 1903, compiling a record of 4–6. Sullivan was a 1903 graduate of Ohio University.

== Head coaching record ==
| Year | Team | Overall | Conference | Standing | Bowl/playoffs |
|---|---|---|---|---|---|
Ohio Green and White (Independent) (1899)
| 1899 | Ohio | 2–2 | | | |
Ohio Green and White (Independent) (1903)
| 1903 | Ohio | 2–4 | | | |
| Ohio: | | 4–6 | | | |
| Total: | | 4–6 | | | |
