= 1899 Kansas State Aggies football team =

American college football season

1899 Kansas State Aggies football
- Conference: Independent
- Record: 2–3
- Head coach: Albert Hansen (1st season)
- Home stadium: Athletic Park

1899 Midwestern college football independents records
	Conf.			Overall
Team	W	L	T	W		L		T
Kansas		–		10	–	0	–	0
North Dakota		–		6	–	0	–	0
Detroit College		–		5	–	0	–	0
Lincoln (MO)		–		1	–	0	–	0
Ohio State		–		9	–	0	–	1
Iowa		–		8	–	0	–	1
Washington University		–		5	–	1	–	0
Missouri		–		9	–	2	–	0
Chicago P&S		–		4	–	1	–	0
Mount Union		–		5	–	1	–	1
Indiana		–		6	–	2	–	0
South Dakota Agricultural		–		3	–	1	–	0
Wabash		–		1	–	0	–	1
Cincinnati		–		5	–	2	–	0
Drake		–		5	–	2	–	0
Heidelberg		–		5	–	2	–	0
Buchtel		–		2	–	1	–	0
Doane		–		2	–	1	–	0
Northern Illinois State		–		1	–	0	–	2
Notre Dame		–		6	–	3	–	1
Central Michigan		–		3	–	2	–	0
Fairmount		–		2	–	1	–	2
Carthage		–		3	–	2	–	1
Western Reserve		–		5	–	4	–	0
Wittenberg		–		5	–	4	–	0
Iowa State		–		5	–	4	–	1
College of Emporia		–		1	–	1	–	1
Ohio		–		2	–	2	–	0
Rush Medical		–		3	–	3	–	1
Ohio Wesleyan		–		5	–	5	–	0
Haskell		–		4	–	5	–	0
Lake Forest		–		4	–	6	–	2
Kansas State		–		2	–	3	–	0
Iowa State Normal		–		1	–	3	–	2
Washburn		–		2	–	5	–	2
Butler		–		1	–	3	–	0
Miami (OH)		–		1	–	5	–	0
Nebraska		–		1	–	7	–	1
North Dakota Agricultural		–		0	–	1	–	0
Baldwin–Wallace		–		0	–	4	–	0

The 1899 Kansas State Aggies football team represented Kansas State Agricultural College—now known as Kansas State University—as an independent during the 1899 college football season. Led by Albert Hansen in his first and only season as head coach, the Aggies compiled a record of 2–3.

== Schedule ==
Date	Time	Opponent	Site	Result	Source
October 14		at Washburn	Topeka, KS	L 0–24	
October 16		at St. Mary's (KS)	St. Marys, KS	L 0–23	
October 30	3:45 p.m.	Kansas Wesleyan	Athletic Park; Manhattan, KS	W 17–5	
November 11		College of Emporia	Athletic Park; Manhattan, KS	W 6–0	
November 30		Kansas State Normal	Manhattan, KS	L 0–20	
