= James McWeeney =

American football coach

James L. McWeeney
Coaching career (HC unless noted)
- 1899: Notre Dame

Head coaching record
- Overall: 6–3–1

James L. McWeeney (October 8, 1866, Glencoe, WI, USA – December 11, 1940) was an American football coach. He was the son of James and Catherine (Scanlon) McWeeney. He served as the head coach at the University of Notre Dame in 1899, tallying a mark of 6–3–1.

James left home at an early age and sold farm machinery in Montana and the Dakota Territories. He went to Chicago in 1885 and worked for the West Division Railway Co. for several years. On June 21, 1890 he joined the Chicago police force. On March 14, 1898 he became a patrol sergeant (History of St Joseph County and the Chicago Police Register 1897–1904). While in Chicago he lived at 1400 Warren Ave. and then at 6551 Lexington Ave.

He was an amateur and professional wrestler and won contest in Greco-Roman wrestling. He traveled to many cities and was regarded as among the best wrestlers in the country. He played football for the Chicago Athletic Club. He was a left guard and was one of the first westerners to show cleverness and originality in the game. McWeeney may not have been a college football player, but was a remarkable athlete in both football and wrestling. He was a lineman (guard) on the Chicago Athletic Association's team that played games across the country, some of them against teams of former Yale, Harvard and other Eastern players.

On August 12, 1899 he resigned from the police force and went to Notre Dame to become football coach and wrestling coach in order to attend the law school. He graduated in 1901. McWeeney's brothers, Patrick and John, also were Chicago policemen. John later became Chicago police superintendent. McWeeney's 1899 team posted a 6-3-1 record, including losses to Chicago and Michigan.

McWeeney succeeded Frank Hering, Notre Dame's first regular coach, but in 1900, McWeeney continued in law school and Australian and former Wisconsin player Pat O'Dea took over as coach.

Football coach McWeeney had a long career as a Greco-Roman wrestler and competed in bouts across the country, including a well-reported exhibition match at Notre Dame against champion John J. Rooney.

In 1902 he became chief of police for South Bend, Indiana after two years on the force. He lived in Chicago for a few years and in 1917 he moved to Gillespie, Illinois where he was a mine inspector.

He married Elizabeth Ganey. They had three sons named James, Edward, and Frank. They also adopted a daughter named Agnes.

James McWeeney died at age 74 from complications after an automobile accident in 1940.

From "T h e N o t r e D a m e A l u m n u s" VoL 19. February 1941 No. 4., page 19: "James L. McWeeny, 68 years old, Gillespie, I11., football and wrestling coach at Notre Dame in 1890-00, died on Dec. 23 as the result of severe injuries suffered in an automobile accident on Dec. 11. Upon leaving Notre Dame Mr. McWeeny joined the South Bend police department, serving as police chief from 1902 to 1910. He had been a wrestler of national reputation."

== Head coaching record ==
Year	Team	Overall	Conference	Standing	Bowl/playoffs
Notre Dame (Independent) (1899)
1899	Notre Dame	6–3–1			
Notre Dame:		6–3–1			
Total:		6–3–1			
