= Ernest Merrell =

American football coach (1875–1938)

Biographical details
- Born: October 5, 1875; Solon, Ohio, U.S.
- Died: July 20, 1938 (aged 62); Cleveland, Ohio, U.S.
- Education: Oberlin College

Coaching career (HC unless noted)
- 1896: Miami (OH)

Head coaching record
- Overall: 3–1

Ernest B. Merrell (October 5, 1875 – July 20, 1938) was an American college football coach in the late 19th century. He served as the head football coach at Miami University in Oxford, Ohio for one season, in 1896, compiling a record of 3–1.

== Early life ==
Merrell was born on October 5, 1875, in Solon, Ohio. His family moved to Chicago, and he attended Englewood High School, where he excelled at athletics. He moved back to Ohio to attend Oberlin College, where he played football.

== Coaching career ==
In 1896, he became the second paid coach at Miami University in Oxford, Ohio. In his only year as coach, Merrell posted a record of 3–1 with victories over Cincinnati, Dayton and Earlham College. Miami ended the season with a 16–4 loss to Butler, the first time the team lost with a paid coach.

== Later life ==
After college, Merrell moved to Cleveland and started a career in banking. In 1930, he became Vice-President of the Cleveland Trust Company. Even in later life, he continued to be involved in the sport of football by officiating games. In 1938, Merrell died at the age of 61 in an automobile accident.

== Head coaching record ==
Year	Team	Overall	Conference	Standing	Bowl/playoffs
Miami Redskins (Independent) (1896)
1896	Miami	3–1			
Miami:		3–1			
Total:		3–1			
