= Archie Eves =

American football player and coach, chemist (1876–1958)

Biographical details
- Born: February 27, 1876; Akron, Ohio, U.S.
- Died: October 18, 1958 (aged 82); Watsonville, California, U.S.

Playing career
- 1895–1896: Buchtel
- 1899–1900: Buchtel

Coaching career (HC unless noted)
- 1899: Buchtel

Head coaching record
- Overall: 2–1

Archie Parvin Eves (February 27, 1876 – October 18, 1958) was an American college football player and coach. He served as the fourth head football coach at Buchtel College—now known as the University of Akron—helming the team for one season in 1899 and compiling a record of 2–1.

Eves later worked as a chemist for the Gillette Rubber Company in Wisconsin. He retired in the early 1950s to Watsonville, California, where he died on October 18, 1958.

== Head coaching record ==
Year	Team	Overall	Conference	Standing	Bowl/playoffs
Buchtel (Independent) (1899)
1899	Buchtel	2–1			
Buchtel:		2–1			
Total:		2–1			
