= Austin John Collett =

Dominican official (1877–1934)

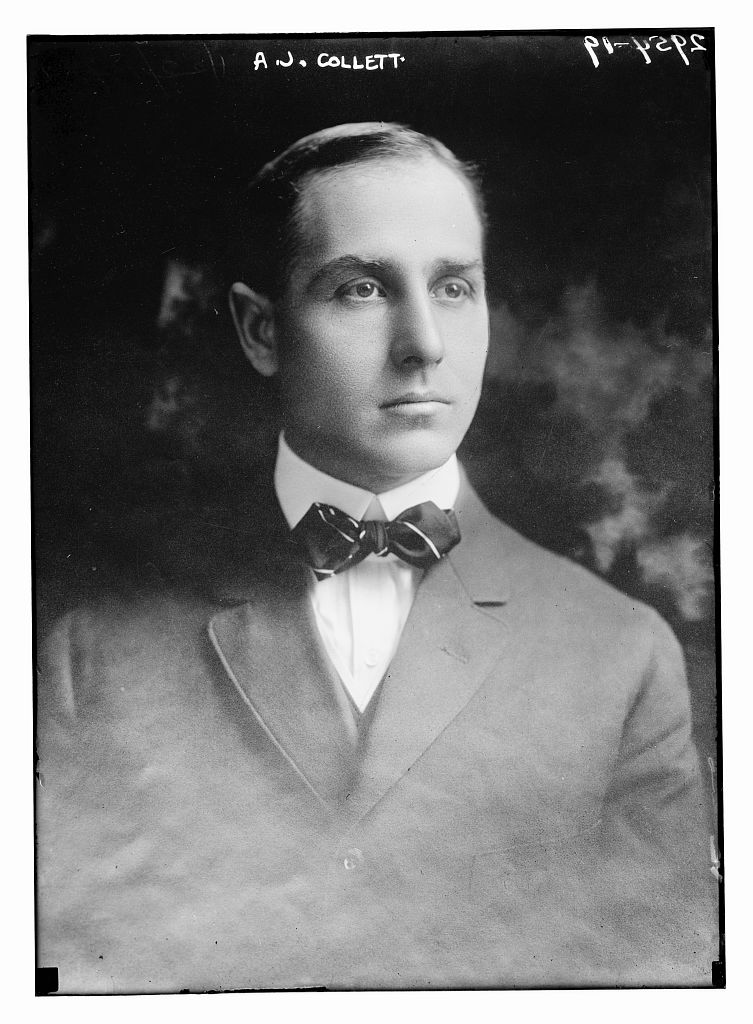

Austin John Collett (September 5, 1877 – May 2, 1934) was the Director-General of Public Works for the Dominican Republic.

== Biography ==
He was born on September 5, 1877. He graduated from the University of Nebraska with the Class of 1900. In 1906, he was hired as an engineer with the Union Pacific Railroad in Omaha, Nebraska. In 1912 he became the Director-General of Public Works for the Dominican Republic. By September 1922, he was working for the Texas Oil Company in Havana, Cuba.

== Personal life ==
On June 5, 1907, he married Ruth Dahlman, the daughter of Omaha, Nebraska's mayor, James Dahlman. Together they had two sons, but divorced prior to 1922.

He died on May 2, 1934, and is buried near his parents in North Omaha's Prospect Hill Cemetery.
