= College of Emporia Fighting Presbies football, 1893–1899 =

American college football seasons

The College of Emporia Fighting Presbies football program from 1893 to 1899 represented the College of Emporia—in its first decade of college football competition. The school did not field a team in 1897.

== 1893 ==
1893 College of Emporia Fighting Presbies football
- Conference: Independent
- Record: 0–1
- Head coach: Vernon Louis Parrington (1st season)

The 1893 College of Emporia Fighting Presbies football team represented College of Emporia as an independent during the 1893 college football season. Led by first-year head coach Vernon Louis Parrington, the team compiled a record of 0–1.

=== Schedule ===
Date	Opponent	Site	Result	Source
December 8	Kansas State Normal	College of Emporia campus; Emporia, KS	L 0–12	

== 1894 ==
1894 College of Emporia Fighting Presbies football
- Conference: Independent
- Record: 4–1
- Head coach: Vernon Louis Parrington (2nd season)
- Captain: Vernon Louis Parrington

The 1894 College of Emporia Fighting Presbies football team represented College of Emporia as an independent during the 1894 college football season. Led by second-year head coach Vernon Louis Parrington, the team compiled a record of 4–1.

=== Schedule ===
Date	Time	Opponent	Site	Result	Attendance	Source
October 22	2:00 p.m.	at Southern Kansas Academy	Southern Kansas Academy grounds; Eureka, KS	W 40–0		
November 3		Washburn	Emporia, KS	L 4–16		
November		Kansas State Normal	?; Emporia, KS	W 4–0		
November		Kansas State Normal	?; Emporia, KS	W 16–0		
November 23	3:30 p.m.	at Washburn	Washburn grounds; Topeka, KS	W 22–0	500	

== 1895 ==
1895 College of Emporia Fighting Presbies football
- Conference: Independent
- Record: 3–2
- Head coach: Vernon Louis Parrington (3rd season)
- Home stadium: Soden's Grove

The 1895 College of Emporia Fighting Presbies football team represented College of Emporia as an independent during the 1895 college football season. Led by third-year head coach Vernon Louis Parrington, the team compiled a record of 3–2. The College of Emporia played home game at Soden's Grove in Emporia, Kansas.

=== Schedule ===
Date	Time	Opponent	Site	Result	Attendance	Source
October 12	3:30 p.m.	Kansas	Soden's Grove; Emporia, KS	L 0–10		
October 21		at Ottawa (KS)	Ottawa, KS	L 4–6		
October 25		vs. Sedalia YMCA	Exposition Park; Kansas City, MO	W 8–0		
November 1		Fort Riley				
November 15		vs. Kansas State Normal	Soden's Grove; Emporia, KS	W 16–2	200	
November 28	3:00 p.m.	Ottawa (KS)	Soden's Grove; Emporia, KS	W 14–6	400–600	

== 1896 ==
1896 College of Emporia Fighting Presbies football
- Conference: Independent
- Record: 2–2
- Head coach: Vernon Louis Parrington (4th season)
- Home stadium: Soden's Grove

The 1896 College of Emporia Fighting Presbies football team represented College of Emporia as an independent during the 1896 college football season. Led by Vernon Louis Parrington in his fourth and final season as head coach, the team compiled a record of 2–2. The College of Emporia played home game at Soden's Grove in Emporia, Kansas.

=== Schedule ===
Date	Time	Opponent	Site	Result	Attendance	Source
October 10		at Kansas	McCook Field; Lawrence, KS	L 0–26	150	
October 12		at Ottawa (KS)	Forest Park Grounds; Ottawa, KS	L 0–30		
October 20		Washburn	Emporia, KS	No contest		
November 14	3:30 p.m.	vs. Kansas State Normal	Soden's Field; Emporia, KS	W 12–0		
November 26		Haskell	Soden's Field; Emporia, KS	W 32–6		

=== Second team schedule ===
Date	Opponent	Site	Result	Source
October 17	Emporia High School	College campus; Emporia, KS	L 4–6	

== 1898 ==
1898 College of Emporia Fighting Presbies football
- Conference: Independent
- Record: 0–2
- Head coach: Unknown

The 1898 College of Emporia Fighting Presbies football team represented College of Emporia as an independent during the 1898 college football season. The team compiled a record of 0–2.

The team began practice of September 27. Chas. Lawrence was appointed as the team's manager and Mayo Savage as temporary captain.

=== Schedule ===
Date	Opponent	Site	Result	Source
after September 28	St. Mary's (KS)		L 0–11	
October 13	at St. Mary's (KS)	St. Marys, KS	L 0–11	

== 1899 ==
1899 College of Emporia Fighting Presbies football
- Conference: Independent
- Record: 1–1–1
- Head coach: A. P. Chapman (1st season)
- Home stadium: Mit-Way Park

The 1899 College of Emporia Fighting Presbies football team represented College of Emporia as an independent during the 1899 college football season. Led by A. P. Chapman in his first and only season as head coach, the team compiled a record of 1–1–1.

=== Schedule ===
Date	Time	Opponent	Site	Result	Source
October 14		Tarkio	Emporia, KS	Canceled	
October 21	3:30 p.m.	vs. Kansas State Normal	Mit-Way Park; Emporia, KS	W 5–0	
October 30	3:50 p.m.	Washburn	Mit-Way Park; Emporia, KS	T 0–0	
November 11		at Kansas State	Athletic Park; Manhattan, KS	L 0–6	
