= 1894 Case football team =

American college football season

1894 Case football
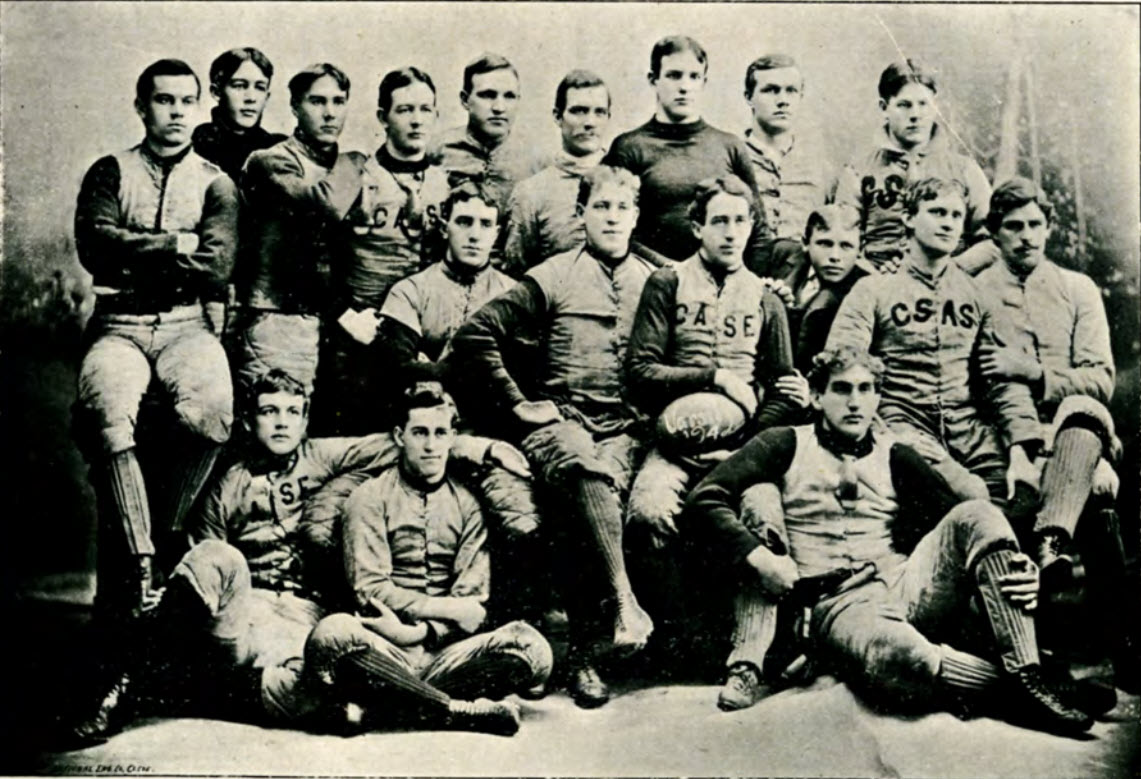
- Conference: Independent
- Record: 4–3
- Head coach: None
- Captain: Alva C. Smith
- Home stadium: League Park

1894 Midwestern college football independents records
	Conf.			Overall
Team	W	L	T	W		L		T
Western Reserve		–		7	–	0	–	0
North Dakota Agricultural		–		2	–	0	–	0
Baldwin–Wallace		–		1	–	0	–	0
Buchtel		–		1	–	0	–	0
Michigan		–		9	–	1	–	1
Iowa Agricultural		–		5	–	1	–	0
College Of Emporia		–		4	–	1	–	0
Minnesota		–		3	–	1	–	0
Washburn		–		3	–	1	–	0
Wittenberg		–		6	–	2	–	0
Doane		–		5	–	2	–	0
Wisconsin		–		5	–	2	–	0
Notre Dame		–		3	–	1	–	1
Beloit		–		6	–	3	–	0
Washington University		–		2	–	1	–	0
Chicago		–		14	–	7	–	1
Kalamazoo		–		2	–	1	–	1
Ohio State		–		6	–	5	–	0
Case		–		4	–	3	–	0
Illinois		–		4	–	3	–	0
Oberlin		–		4	–	3	–	1
Cincinnati		–		3	–	3	–	0
Drake		–		2	–	2	–	0
Mount Union		–		4	–	5	–	0
Lake Forest		–		3	–	4	–	0
Miami (OH)		–		1	–	2	–	0
Ohio Wesleyan		–		1	–	3	–	0
Rush Medical		–		3	–	6	–	0
Northwestern		–		1	–	5	–	0
Ohio		–		0	–	1	–	0
South Dakota		–		0	–	2	–	0

The 1894 Case football team was an American football team that represented the Case School of Applied Science in Cleveland, Ohio, now a part of Case Western Reserve University. Playing as an independent during the 1894 college football season, the team compiled a 4–3 record, outscoring opponents by a total of 138 to 62.

Charley Gleason was the star halfback, who also previously played on the 1889 Georgetown football team. Captain Alva C. Smith played quarterback.

The 38–0 victory over Ohio State was the biggest point differential loss faced by the Buckeyes that season.

== Schedule ==
Date	Time	Opponent	Site	Result	Source
October 13		at Cleveland Athletic Club	Cleveland, OH	W 20–0	
October 20		at Hiram	Hiram, OH	W 34–0	
October 27		Michigan	League Park; Cleveland, OH	L 8–18	
November 3		Oberlin	League Park; Cleveland, OH	L 6–20	
November 10	2:30 p.m.	Ohio State	League Park; Cleveland, OH	W 38–0	
November 17		at Kenyon	Gambier, OH	W 42–0	
November 29	11:30 p.m.	Western Reserve	League Park; Cleveland, OH	L 0–24	
