= Walter E. Garrey =

American physiologist (1874–1951)

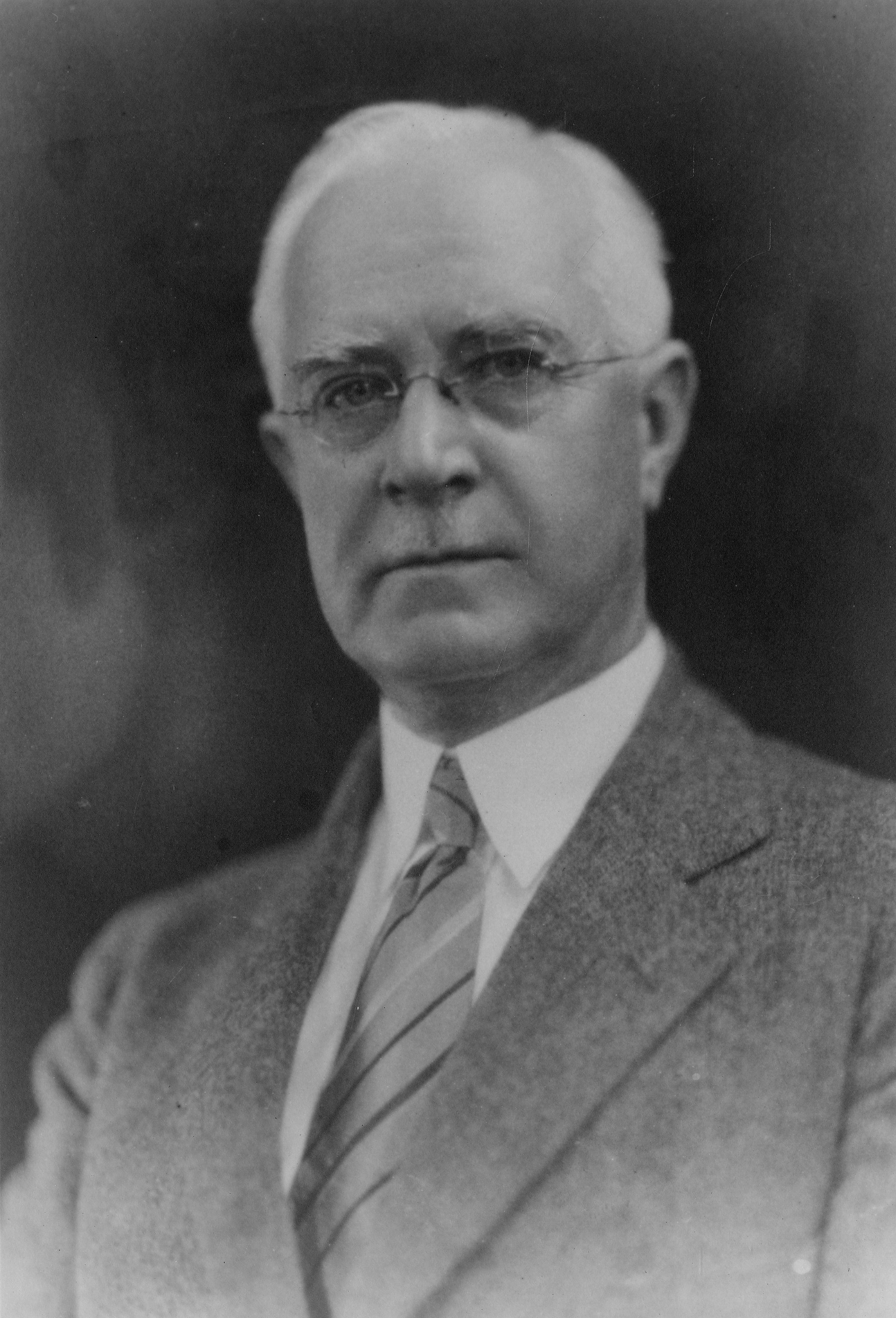
Walter E. Garrey

Walter Eugene Garrey (April 7, 1874 – June 15, 1951) was an American physiologist and department head of the Vanderbilt University School of Medicine. He was known especially for his studies of the heart. He served as president of the American Physiological Society in 1938 and 1939.

Garrey graduated from Lawrence University in Appleton, Wisconsin in 1894 and subsequently attended the University of Chicago for his graduate work, where he played as an end on the 1894 Chicago Maroons football team. He served as the head football coach at Stevens Point Normal School—now known as University of Wisconsin–Stevens Point—in 1899.
