= 1894 Chicago Athletic Association football team =

American football team season

1894 Chicago Athletic Association football
- League: Independent
- Record: 8–3–1
- Manager: Harry Cornish (2nd year)
- Captain: Jesse Van Doozer (Note: Appointed captain on October 15.)
- Home field: South Side Park

The 1894 Chicago Athletic Association football team represented the Chicago Athletic Association, or C. A. A., during the 1894 college football season. In manager Harry Cornish's second year with the athletic club, CAA compiled an 8–3–1 record, and outscored their opponents 142 to 124. The team played its home games at South Side Park, located on the corner of 35th Street and Wentworth Avenue, in Chicago.

== Schedule ==
Date	Time	Opponent	Site	Result	Attendance	Source
September 29	3:00 p.m.	at Chicago	Marshall Field; Chicago, IL	W 12–4	3,000	
October 6		at Wisconsin	Randall Field; Madison, WI	L 4–22	1,500	
October 13	3:30 p.m.	Illinois	South Side Park; Chicago, IL	W 14–0		
October 20	3:30 p.m.	at Rush Medical	West Side Park; Chicago, IL	W 12–6		
October 24		at Chicago	Marshall Field; Chicago, IL	W 30–0		
October 27	3:00 p.m.	Wisconsin	South Side Park; Chicago, IL	W 16–4		
November 6		at Boston Athletic Association	Soldiers' Field; Boston, MA	W 22–0		
November 10		at Harvard	Soldiers' Field; Boston, MA	L 0–36	3,500	
November 12		at MIT	South End Grounds; Boston, MA	T 4–4	100	
November 14		Yale	Yale Field; New Haven, CT	L 0–48	1,500	
November 17		at Allegheny Athletic Association	Exposition Park; Allegheny City, PA	W 24–0	1,000	
November 29	1:15 p.m.	Dartmouth	South Side Park; Chicago, IL	W 4–0	4,000	

== Second team schedule ==
The CAA also operated a 2nd team, which played one known contest against the Chicago Maroons, and lost 20–0.

Date	Opponent	Site	Result
October 17	Chicago	Marshall Field; Chicago, IL	L 0–20
