= 1894 Drake Bulldogs football team =

American college football season

1894 Drake Bulldogs football
- Conference: Independent
- Record: 2–2
- Head coach: W. W. Wharton (1st season)

1894 Midwestern college football independents records
	Conf.			Overall
Team	W	L	T	W		L		T
Western Reserve		–		7	–	0	–	0
North Dakota Agricultural		–		2	–	0	–	0
Baldwin–Wallace		–		1	–	0	–	0
Buchtel		–		1	–	0	–	0
Michigan		–		9	–	1	–	1
Iowa Agricultural		–		5	–	1	–	0
College Of Emporia		–		4	–	1	–	0
Minnesota		–		3	–	1	–	0
Washburn		–		3	–	1	–	0
Wittenberg		–		6	–	2	–	0
Doane		–		5	–	2	–	0
Wisconsin		–		5	–	2	–	0
Notre Dame		–		3	–	1	–	1
Beloit		–		6	–	3	–	0
Washington University		–		2	–	1	–	0
Chicago		–		14	–	7	–	1
Kalamazoo		–		2	–	1	–	1
Ohio State		–		6	–	5	–	0
Case		–		4	–	3	–	0
Illinois		–		4	–	3	–	0
Oberlin		–		4	–	3	–	1
Cincinnati		–		3	–	3	–	0
Drake		–		2	–	2	–	0
Mount Union		–		4	–	5	–	0
Lake Forest		–		3	–	4	–	0
Miami (OH)		–		1	–	2	–	0
Ohio Wesleyan		–		1	–	3	–	0
Rush Medical		–		3	–	6	–	0
Northwestern		–		1	–	5	–	0
Ohio		–		0	–	1	–	0
South Dakota		–		0	–	2	–	0

The 1894 Drake Bulldogs football team was an American football team that represented Drake University as an independent during the 1894 college football season. In its first and only season under head coach W. W. Wharton, the team compiled a 2–2 record and was outscored by a total of 48 to 34.

== Schedule ==
Date	Opponent	Site	Result
September 8	at Panora Athletic Club	Panora, IA	L 0–20
September 22	at YMCA		W 16–6
	at Grinnell	Grinnell, IA	W 16–4
	at Simpson	Indianola, IA	L 0–18
