= 1894 Iowa Agricultural Cardinals football team =

American college football season

1894 Iowa Agricultural Cardinals football
- Conference: Independent
- Record: 5–1
- Head coach: Bert German (1st season)
- Captain: Bert German

1894 Midwestern college football independents records
	Conf.			Overall
Team	W	L	T	W		L		T
Western Reserve		–		7	–	0	–	0
North Dakota Agricultural		–		2	–	0	–	0
Baldwin–Wallace		–		1	–	0	–	0
Buchtel		–		1	–	0	–	0
Michigan		–		9	–	1	–	1
Iowa Agricultural		–		5	–	1	–	0
College Of Emporia		–		4	–	1	–	0
Minnesota		–		3	–	1	–	0
Washburn		–		3	–	1	–	0
Wittenberg		–		6	–	2	–	0
Doane		–		5	–	2	–	0
Wisconsin		–		5	–	2	–	0
Notre Dame		–		3	–	1	–	1
Beloit		–		6	–	3	–	0
Washington University		–		2	–	1	–	0
Chicago		–		14	–	7	–	1
Kalamazoo		–		2	–	1	–	1
Ohio State		–		6	–	5	–	0
Case		–		4	–	3	–	0
Illinois		–		4	–	3	–	0
Oberlin		–		4	–	3	–	1
Cincinnati		–		3	–	3	–	0
Drake		–		2	–	2	–	0
Mount Union		–		4	–	5	–	0
Lake Forest		–		3	–	4	–	0
Miami (OH)		–		1	–	2	–	0
Ohio Wesleyan		–		1	–	3	–	0
Rush Medical		–		3	–	6	–	0
Northwestern		–		1	–	5	–	0
Ohio		–		0	–	1	–	0
South Dakota		–		0	–	2	–	0

The 1894 Iowa Agricultural Cardinals football team represented Iowa Agricultural College (later renamed Iowa State University) as an independent during the 1894 college football season. The 1894 Cardinals compiled a 5–1 record, shut out three of six opponents, and outscored all opponents by a combined total of 180 to 24. In the first game of the Iowa–Iowa State football rivalry, the Cardinals defeated the Hawkeyes by a 16–8 score. Bert German is identified as both the head coach and the team captain.

Between 1892 and 1913, the football team played on a field that later became the site of the university's Parks Library.

== Schedule ==
Date	Opponent	Site	Result	Source
September 2	vs. Fort Dodge	Webster City, IA	W 46–0	
September 3	at Des Moines YMCA	Des Moines, IA	W 18–4	
September 29	at Grinnell	Grinnell, IA	L 6–12	
October 1	at Iowa	Iowa Field; Iowa City, IA (rivalry)	W 16–8	
October 13	at Simpson	Indianola, IA	W 28–0	
November 9	Panora	Ames, IA	W 66–0	
