= 1894 Michigan Wolverines football team =

American college football season

1894 Michigan Wolverines football
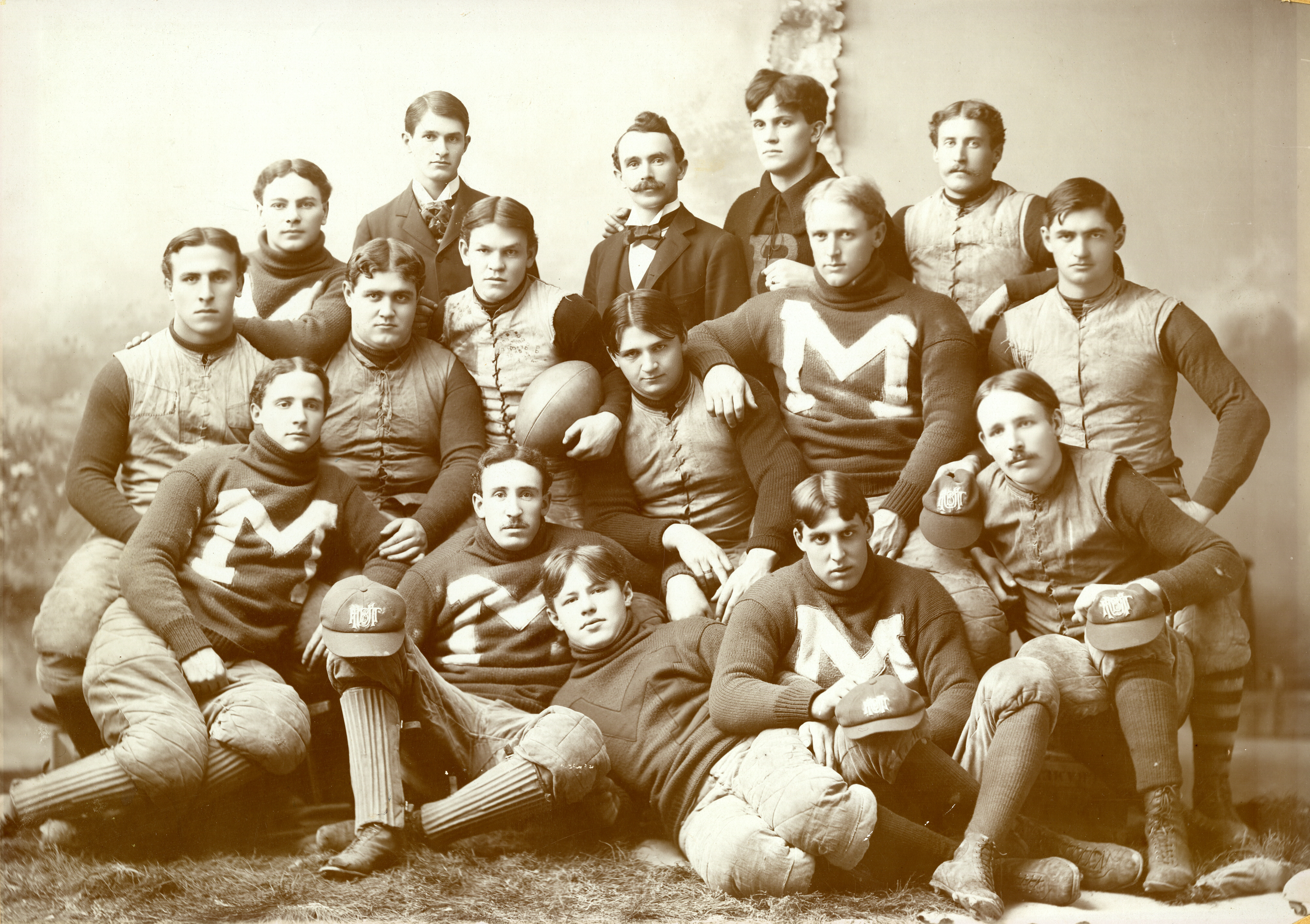
- Conference: Independent
- Record: 9–1–1
- Head coach: William McCauley (1st season)
- Captain: James Baird
- Home stadium: Regents Field

1894 Midwestern college football independents records
	Conf.			Overall
Team	W	L	T	W		L		T
Western Reserve		–		7	–	0	–	0
North Dakota Agricultural		–		2	–	0	–	0
Baldwin–Wallace		–		1	–	0	–	0
Buchtel		–		1	–	0	–	0
Michigan		–		9	–	1	–	1
Iowa Agricultural		–		5	–	1	–	0
College Of Emporia		–		4	–	1	–	0
Minnesota		–		3	–	1	–	0
Washburn		–		3	–	1	–	0
Wittenberg		–		6	–	2	–	0
Doane		–		5	–	2	–	0
Wisconsin		–		5	–	2	–	0
Notre Dame		–		3	–	1	–	1
Beloit		–		6	–	3	–	0
Washington University		–		2	–	1	–	0
Chicago		–		14	–	7	–	1
Kalamazoo		–		2	–	1	–	1
Ohio State		–		6	–	5	–	0
Case		–		4	–	3	–	0
Illinois		–		4	–	3	–	0
Oberlin		–		4	–	3	–	1
Cincinnati		–		3	–	3	–	0
Drake		–		2	–	2	–	0
Mount Union		–		4	–	5	–	0
Lake Forest		–		3	–	4	–	0
Miami (OH)		–		1	–	2	–	0
Ohio Wesleyan		–		1	–	3	–	0
Rush Medical		–		3	–	6	–	0
Northwestern		–		1	–	5	–	0
Ohio		–		0	–	1	–	0
South Dakota		–		0	–	2	–	0

The 1894 Michigan Wolverines football team was an American football team that represented the University of Michigan in the 1894 college football season. In its first season under head coach William McCauley, the team compiled a 9–1–1 record and outscored its opponents by a combined score of 244 to 84.

The Wolverines played two games against Cornell, losing at Ithaca and winning the second game in Detroit. The win over Cornell "marked the first time in collegiate football history that a western school defeated an established power from the east." The Wolverines closed the season with a victory over Amos Alonzo Stagg's University of Chicago Maroons.

James Baird was the team's captain and quarterback.

== Schedule ==
Date	Time	Opponent	Site	Result	Attendance
October 6		Michigan Military Academy	Regents Field; Ann Arbor, MI	T 12–12	900
October 13		Albion	Regents Field; Ann Arbor, MI	W 26–10	
October 17		Olivet	Regents Field; Ann Arbor, MI	W 48–0	
October 21		Michigan Military Academy	Regents Field; Ann Arbor, MI	W 40–6	800
October 23	4:10 p.m.	Adrian	Regents Field; Ann Arbor, MI	W 46–0	
October 27		at Case	League Park; Cleveland, OH	W 18–8	
November 3		at Cornell	Percy Field; Ithaca, NY	L 0–22	1,000
November 10		vs. Kansas	Exposition Park; Kansas City, MO	W 22–12	5,000
November 17		Oberlin	Regents Field; Ann Arbor, MI	W 14–6	1,200–2,200
November 24	2:30 p.m.	vs. Cornell	Detroit Athletic Club Field; Detroit, MI	W 12–4	4,000
November 29	11:00 a.m.	at Chicago	Marshall Field; Chicago, IL (rivalry)	W 6–4	6,000

== Season summary ==
=== Preseason ===
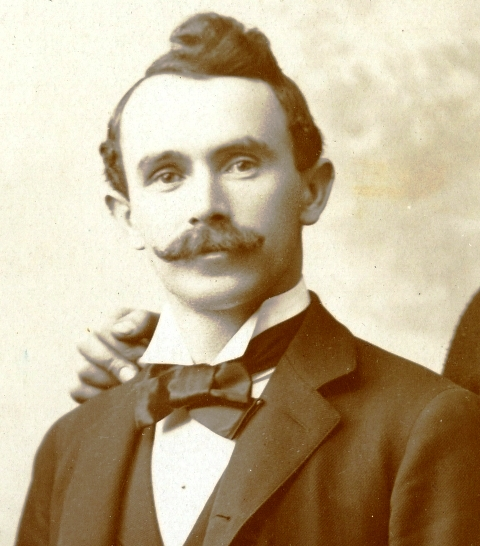
Trainer Keene Fitzpatrick came to Ann Arbor in 1894 and became known as "one of the pioneers of intercollegiate sport."

Prior to the 1894 season, three individuals took charge of the Michigan football program—each of whom would play an important role in its development. The first was Charles A. Baird, manager of the football team who later became Michigan's first athletic director and was the person who hired Fielding H. Yost in 1901. In 1894, Baird hired William McCauley, who had played at the tackle position on Princeton's championship team in 1893, as Michigan's head football coach. In two years as Michigan's head coach, McCauley led the Wolverines to a 17–2–1 record. The third member of Michigan's football triumvirate in 1894 was Keene Fitzpatrick, a nationally known track coach, who Baird hired as the football team's trainer. Baird's hiring of McCauley and Fitzpatrick led to a heightened level of interest in the football team. The Michigan Alumnus described the impact of the new coaching staff:

"The work of both of these enthusiasts can be seen in the practice of the team from day to day. At a mass meeting held last month great enthusiasm was shown by students, and several hundred dollars was [sic] raised for the team. Thus, for the first time in the history of Michigan football, the manager was able to secure the necessary equipment for a first-class eleven. Lack of money has been the cry hitherto."

Several players returned in 1894 from the 1893 team, including quarterback and team captain James Baird, halfbacks Gustave Ferbert, Horace Dyer, and George Dygert, guard "Pa" Heninger, center C. H. Smith, end Henry Senter, and tackle Giovanni "Count" Villa.

=== Game 1: Michigan Military Academy ===
Michigan Military Academy at Michigan

Team	1	2	Total
Michigan Military Academy	6	6	12
Michigan	6	6	12

- Date: October 8
- Location: Regents Field, Ann Arbor, MI
- Game attendance: 900
- Referee: A. C. Bartells (Michigan)

The Michigan football team opened the 1894 season on October 6, 1894, with its first of two games against the Michigan Military Academy from Orchard Lake, Michigan. The 50-minute game was played before 900 spectators at Regents Field and ended in a 12–12 tie. A large contingent from the Academy attended the game.

The game was preceded by a Friday evening mass meeting. Enthusiasm was high, and the team was well supported throughout the game. Left halfback John A. Bloomingston scored Michigan's first touchdown and kicked goal. The Military Academy tied the game a short time later on a touchdown by Burrows and goal kick by Deering. The score was tied at 6–6 at halftime. Four minutes into the second half, the Military Academy executed a double pass, and Burrows ran around end for a touchdown, with Deering again kicking goal. Eleven minutes later, Michigan tied the score on a short touchdown carry by fullback George Dygert and goal kick by Bloomingston. Dygert later missed a drop-kick field goal attempt from the 30-yard line.

The Inlander, a monthly magazine published by students at the University of Michigan, noted that the team had been training for only four days, and the result was "quite a disappointment for those interested in the team." The Michigan Alumnus also blamed the result on lack of training, noting that the team did not commence practice until October 1, and concluding that the Academy's Cadets "had the advantage of longer training, and played a quick, snappy game."

Michigan's lineup against Michigan Military Academy was George Greenleaf (left end), Walter A. Parker (left tackle), Bert Carr (left guard), Warren Rundell (center), Frederick W. Henninger (right guard), Ralph W. E. Hayes (right tackle), H. G. Hadden (right end), James Baird (quarterback), Bloomingston (left halfback), Jesse Yont (right halfback), and Dygert (fullback).

=== Game 2: Albion ===
Albion at Michigan

Team	1	2	Total
Albion	4	6	10
• Michigan	18	8	26

- Date: October 13
- Location: Regents Field, Ann Arbor, MI
- Referee: A. C. Bartells (Michigan)

On October 13, 1894, Michigan defeated Albion, 26 to 10, at Regents Field in Ann Arbor. The game was the 11th meeting between the Michigan and Albion football teams with Michigan winning ten games and Albion winning one. As of 1894, Michigan had played more games against Albion than any other team.

Bloomingston scored Michigan's first touchdown, and Dygert kicked goal. A full recitation of Michigan's scoring has not been found, but The U. of M. Daily reported that Bloomingston scored two touchdowns in the game while Yont and Leonard also ran for touchdowns. Dygert kicked two goals from touchdown in the game.

Michigan's lineup against Albion was Greenleaf (left end), Parker (left tackle), Carr (left guard), Smith (center), Henninger (right guard), Yont (right tackle), Price (right end), Baird (quarterback), Bloomingston (left halfback), Richards (right halfback), and Dygert (fullback).

=== Game 3: Olivet ===
Olivet at Michigan

Team	1	2	Total
Olivet	0	0	0
• Michigan	24	24	48

- Date: October 17
- Location: Regents Field, Ann Arbor, MI
- Referee: A. C. Bartells (Michigan)

On October 17, 1894, Michigan defeated Olivet, 48–0, at Regents Field in Ann Arbor. The game was the second and final meeting between Michigan and Olivet. Michigan won the first game in 1891 by a score of 18 to 6.

Left halfback Gustave Ferbert scored Michigan's first and second touchdowns, and the kick for goal failed each time. Michigan led, 8–0. Jesse Yont scored the third touchdown, and the kick for goal was good. Michigan led, 14–0. Right guard Frederick W. Henninger scored the fourth and fifth touchdowns, and one of the goals was kicked. Michigan led, 24–0, at halftime. In the second half, Michigan scored four touchdowns and kicked all four goals from touchdown. Touchdowns were scored by Yont (25-yard run), Raynor Freund, Herman Leonard, and Frank Villa.

The Detroit Free Press wrote that, following the lopsided win, "[t]he croakers are silent to-night." Olivet gained positive yardage on only 10 plays in the entire game and gained the required five yards for a first down only three times.

Michigan's starting lineup was made up of George Greenleaf (left end), Villa (left tackle), Bert Carr (left guard), C. H. Smith (center), Henninger (right guard), Yont (right tackle), H. G. Hadden (right end), James Baird (quarterback), Ferbert (left halfback), J. De Forest Richards (right halfback), and Horace Dyer (fullback). Substitutions were Daniel Ninde for Carr, Leonard for Ferbert, and Freund for Richards.

=== Game 4: Michigan Military Academy ===
Michigan Military Academy at Michigan

Team	1	2	Total
Michigan Military Academy	0	6	6
• Michigan	18	22	40

- Date: October 21
- Location: Regents Field, Ann Arbor, MI
- Game attendance: 800
- Referee: A. C. Bartells (Michigan)

On October 21, 1894, Michigan played a second game against the Michigan Military Academy (M.M.A.) After playing M.M.A. to a tie 13 days earlier, the Wolverines soundly defeated the Cadets, 40–6, in the rematch. The game was played before a crowd of 800 spectators at Regents Field in Ann Arbor. Michigan touchdowns in the first half were scored by Frank Villa, Richards (2), and Yont. Baird made one kick for goal, and Michigan led, 18–0, at halftime. In the second half, two touchdowns were scored by Bloomingston, and single touchdowns were scored by Henninger, Yont, and Bloomingston. Bloomingston also kicked two goals from touchdown. Michigan's team captain and quarterback Baird was injured in the game and was unable to play for three weeks.

Michigan's lineup against M.M.A. was George Greenleaf (left end), Villa (left tackle), Ninde (left guard), Smith (center), Henninger (right guard), Yont (right tackle), Hadden (right end), Baird (quarterback), Ferbert (left halfback), Bloomingston (right halfback), and Dyer (fullback).

=== Game 5: Adrian ===
Adrian at Michigan

Team	1	2	Total
Adrian	0	0	0
• Michigan	30	16	46

- Date: October 23
- Location: Regents Field, Ann Arbor, MI
- Referee: R. Bourland

On October 23, 1894, Michigan defeated Adrian, 46–0, at Regents Field. The game was the first and last game between the Michigan and Adrian football teams.

The game was played in "a steady downpour of rain and was witnessed by a small crowd." Michigan scored six touchdowns in the first half and three in the second half. The first half was 30 minutes in length, and the second half was limited to 10 minutes due to darkness. Right halfback John A. Bloomingston scored four touchdowns. Right guard Frederick A. Henninger scored three, and single touchdowns were scored by left halfback Gustave Ferbert and fullback Dyer. Bloomingston also kicked at least two goals from touchdown.

The team's captain, James Baird, did not play due to injury. Ferbert acted as captain in Baird's absence.

Michigan's lineup against Adrian was Edward Ryan (left end), John W. Reynolds (left tackle), Daniel Ninde (left guard), C. H. Smith (center), Henninger (right guard), Jesse Yont (right tackle), H. G. Hadden (right end), Norris (quarterback), Ferbert (left halfback), Bloomingston (right halfback), and Horace Dyer (fullback).

=== Game 6: Case ===
Case at Michigan

Team	1	2	Total
Case	4	4	8
• Michigan	6	12	18

- Date: October 27
- Location: League Park, Cleveland
- Referee: N. G. Williams

On October 27, 1894, Michigan defeated Case, 18–8, at League Park in Cleveland. Case had not been defeated in two years. The game was the first meeting between Michigan and Case. The two teams played each other 27 times between 1894 and 1923, with Michigan winning 26 of those games.

Right halfback John A. Bloomingston scored all 18 points for Michigan with three touchdowns, including a 30-yard touchdown run in the second half, and three goals after touchdown. The Detroit Free Press also praised left halfback Gustave Ferbert for having consistently "wriggled" away from the Case tacklers and covered himself in glory. Riley scored two touchdowns for Case.

The game was described as "by long odds the finest and best game of the season so far as Cleveland is concerned." Michigan's win was attributed to "the superior strength and weight of their rush line," and its line play was described as "beautiful to see" and "about as fine as could be imagined."

Michigan's captain and quarterback James Baird, did not play due to injury. Ferbert acted as captain in Baird's absence. Ferbert sustained "a fearful kick in the head ... cutting his scalp badly, but he stubbornly continued playing."

Michigan's 11 starters played the entire 60-minute game without substitution. They were Hadden (left end), Villa (left tackle), Ninde (left guard), Smith (center), Henninger (right guard), Yont (right tackle), Price (right end), Greenleaf (quarterback), Bloomingston (right halfback), Ferbert (left halfback), and Dyer (fullback).

=== Game 7: at Cornell ===
Michigan at Cornell

Team	1	2	Total
Michigan	0	0	0
• Cornell	8	14	22

- Date: November 3
- Location: Percy Field, Ithaca, New York
- Game attendance: 1,000
- Referee: E. M. Mills (Cornell)

On November 3, 1894, Michigan lost to Cornell, 22–0, before a crowd of 1,000 spectators at Percy Field in Ithaca, New York. It was Michigan's seventh consecutive loss to Cornell dating back to 1889.

The game was played in halves of 35 and 25 minutes. Kelly scored Cornell's first touchdown at the 6-minute mark, and the kick for goal failed. Rogers scored Cornell's second touchdown, but the goal was again missed, and Cornell led 8–0 at halftime. In the second half, Beacham of Cornell quickly scored two touchdowns. Near the end of the game, Starbuckle ran 25 yards for a final Cornell touchdown. Fullback Ohl of Cornell made only one of five kicks for goal for touchdown. Heavy rain fell through most of the game. The loss to Cornell was Michigan's only loss of the 1894 season.

Michigan's lineup against Cornell was Hadden (left end), Villa (left tackle), Carr (left guard), Smith (center), Henninger (right guard), Reynolds (right tackle), Price (right end), Ferbert (quarterback), Richards (left halfback), Bloomingston (right halfback), and Dygert (fullback). Michigan played the game without its captain and starting quarterback, James Baird, following a knee injury sustained in the October 21 game with the Michigan Military Academy.

=== Game 8: vs. Kansas ===
Michigan vs. Kansas

Team	1	2	Total
• Michigan	16	6	22
Kansas	6	4	10

- Date: November 10
- Location: Exposition Park, Kansas City, Missouri
- Referee: Matson (Harvard)

On November 10, 1894, Michigan defeated Kansas, 22–12, before a crowd of 5,000 spectators at Exposition Park in Kansas City, Missouri. It was the second meeting between the two schools, Michigan, having won the first meeting in 1893 by a score of 22 to 0.

Michigan won the coin toss at the start of the game and chose to play with the wind during the first half. On the opening kickoff, Ferbert "made a pretty run of 20 yards," and Michigan drove the distance of the field for a touchdown. The biggest gains on the scoring drive were runs of 25 yards by Bloomingston and 20 yards by Dyer. Dygert scored the touchdown at the 9-minute mark with Bloomingston kicking the goal from touchdown to give Michigan a 6–0 lead. At the 7-minute mark, Senter scored Michigan's second touchdown on a 30-yard run, and Bloomingston again kicked goal. Price scored Michigan's third touchdown, but the Wolverines missed the goal kick and led, 16–0. Later in the half, Kansas right end Armour ran 75 yards for a touchdown, and Piatt kicked the goal. Shortly before halftime, Michigan blocked a Kansas kick and Ferbert fell on the ball one foot from Kansas' goal line. Time was called by the linesman before Michigan could run another play, and the Wolverines led, 16–6, at halftime.

According to the game account in the Detroit Free Press, "the Michigan team seemed to go completely to pieces" during the second half. Hester scored a touchdown for Kansas to narrow the lead to 16–10; Kansas' kick for goal was unsuccessful. Ferbert scored Michigan's final touchdown in the second half, and Bloomington kicked the goal to give Michigan a 22–12 lead.

The Detroit Free Press reported: "Despite a cold bleak day, 5,000 people witnessed the contest and pronounced it the best ever seen in Kansas City. Society was out in full force, the entire east side of the field being packed with carriages of every description." The Nebraska State Journal wrote: "Michigan won the game by sheer strength. Her team is unusually heavy and her centers a stone wall."

Ten of Michigan's starters played the entire game without substitution. They are Senter (left end), Villa (left tackle), Carr (left guard), Smith (center), Henninger (right guard), Reynolds (right tackle), Price (right end), Ferbert (quarterback), Dygert (left halfback), and Bloomingston (right halfback). Dyer started the game at fullback, but was replaced due to injury by Baird. Baird was then replaced by Richards.

=== Game 9: Oberlin ===
Oberlin at Michigan

Team	1	2	Total
Oberlin	6	0	6
• Michigan	4	10	14

- Date: November 17
- Location: Regents Field, Ann Arbor, MI
- Game attendance: 1,200–2,200
- Referee: Gage (Harvard)

On November 17, 1894, Michigan defeated Oberlin, 14–6, on Regents Field in Ann Arbor. The crowd was stated as 1,200 by The U. of M. Daily and Detroit Free Press, but was stated as 2,200 in The Michigan Alumnus. Even at 1,200 persons, The U. of M. Daily called it "[p]robably the largest crowd" ever on Michigan's athletic field. The Detroit Free Press added: "The game was the hardest played here this season, but was characterized by gentlemanly playing throughout. . . . Michigan played slow at first, but gradually warmed up to the work and showed its strength. Every man on the team played good ball. Villa was particularly good and did brilliant work on the offense and defense."

Oberlin scored the game's first points on a 60-yard touchdown run by Boothman, a sprinter who had run the 100-yard dash in 10 seconds. Bogrand kicked the goal from touchdown, and Oberlin led, 6–0. Michigan did not score until 16 minutes into the game. Michigan's first touchdown was scored by Bloomingston, completing a steady drive down the field. Bloomingston missed the goal after touchdown and trailed, 6–4, at halftime.

In the second half, "Michigan had it all her own way, Oberlin fought hard, but could do nothing against the constant hammering of her line." Michigan halfback Richards scored six minutes into the second half, but Michigan again missed the goal after touchdown. Michigan led, 8–6. The final touchdown was scored by Villa "who broke through the line, and tossing all tacklers off, ran 40 yards for a touchdown." Bloomingston kicked the goal from touchdown.

University of Chicago head coach Amos Alonzo Stagg acted as umpire in the game. The Detroit Free Press complained that Stagg's "biased decisions" slowed Michigan's progress and opined that he was "decidedly one-sided in his decisions, giving Oberlin the ball four times for holding and also 40 yards for off side."

All 11 of Michigan's starters played the entire game without substitution. They were Senter (left end), Villa (left tackle), Carr (left guard), Smith (center), Henninger (right guard), Hadden (right tackle), Price (right end), Ferbert (quarterback), Richards (left halfback), Dygert (right halfback), and Bloomingston (fullback).

=== Game 10: vs. Cornell ===
Cornell vs. Michigan

Team	1	2	Total
Cornell	4	0	4
• Michigan	6	6	12

- Date: November 24
- Location: Detroit Athletic Club, Detroit
- Game attendance: 4,000
- Referee: F. M. Gould (Amherst)

After losing to Cornell earlier in the season, Michigan played Cornell again on November 24, 1894, this time at the Detroit Athletic Club Field in Detroit. With team captain Baird back in the lineup at quarterback, Michigan fans anticipated a close match. In preparation for the game, The Michigan Daily developed a plan to have the Michigan fans sing appropriate songs to familiar tunes during the game, and a yell-master was appointed to lead the "noise-making ceremonies," including the "time-honored college yell and cheers and the foghorns, etc."

Two-thousand students traveled from Ann Arbor to watch the game, as did "a considerable number of the faculty." The Detroit Free Press described the commotion created by the large crowd arriving by train: "Striking Woodward avenue this advance column made policemen for blocks prick up their ears for a moment by their yells and onward the legions filed . . . Every place showing a profusion of yellow chrysanthemums in a window was looted . . ."

The game was started at 2:30 p.m. on a cloudy and chilly afternoon before 4,000 spectators, the largest crowd ever present at a game in Detroit. Michigan scored a touchdown in the first half on a series of tackle plays in which Senter, Ferbert, Villa, Dyer and Bloomingston participated. Cornell followed with its own touchdown but missed the goal after touchdown. In the second half, Michigan drove the ball to Cornell's 2½ yard line, and Yont fell on the ball for a touchdown. Bloomingston kicked the goal after touchdown to make the score 12 to 4.

The Detroit Free Press described the efforts of Michigan's yell-master to incite the crowd:

"Stationed at regular intervals along the line were the howling master and his worthy assistants. . . . The howling master would raise his cane and start the college yell and the hundreds nearest him would join in. . . . At first these yells could be heard nearly to Grand Circus park, but in the last ten minutes of play the real enjoyment was in watching the facial movements of the howlers. Their voices had been wafted away by the gentle breezes and all that was left was a rasping, guttural sound accompanied by an expression of determination but nothing vocal to carry it out."

Michigan did not allow Cornell to score in the second half and won the game 12 to 4. One newspaper described the ferocity of the game as follows:

"The fiercest struggle at football that ever took place on Michigan soil was the game between Michigan and Cornell universities. It was pluck against pluck, strategy against strategy, strength against strength, and Michigan developed the most strategy, had the most strength, but in pluck honors were even."

When the game ended, "[t]he crowd went wild, and hats, canes and everything available flew into the air. Over the ropes went the crowd and the fortunate players were picked up and carried from the field." A group of 500 students, stretching a block in length, towed a large green bus carrying the team from the athletic grounds. The procession, accompanied by a large crowd, moved loudly up Woodward Avenue with the team in tow until the bus reached Russell House where the team spent the night. The team was entertained by a vaudeville show while seated in the boxes at the Whitney Opera House, which was decorated with chrysanthemums and colored ribbons. According to an account in the Detroit Free Press, the city was given over to "the U. of M. boys" for the night: "Wherever one turned he was confronted with the din and tumult; the ear-splitting yells from throats with vocal chords of extraordinary vibratory possibilities." The police "showed no disposition to exercise any authority to quell this miniature riot. Probably they knew that it would be like battling with the raging elements, and wisely resorted to extreme discretion." Many of the city's residents were reportedly entertained by the spectacle: "Heretofore some idea of college boys had only been gleaned from a minstrel performance ... But last night the city was deluged with college enthusiasm, and the vitality of the boys was something amazing and awe-inspiring. There seemed to be no limit to their energy."

All but one of Michigan's starters played the entire game. The starting lineup for Michigan was: Senter (left end), Villa (left tackle), Carr (left guard), Smith (center), Henninger (right guard), Hadden (right tackle), Price (right end), Baird (quarterback), Ferbert (left halfback), Bloomingston (right halfback), and Dyer (fullback). The sole Michigan substitution was Yont for Villa after Villa wrenched his leg and had to leave the field.

==== Historical significance of the Cornell game ====
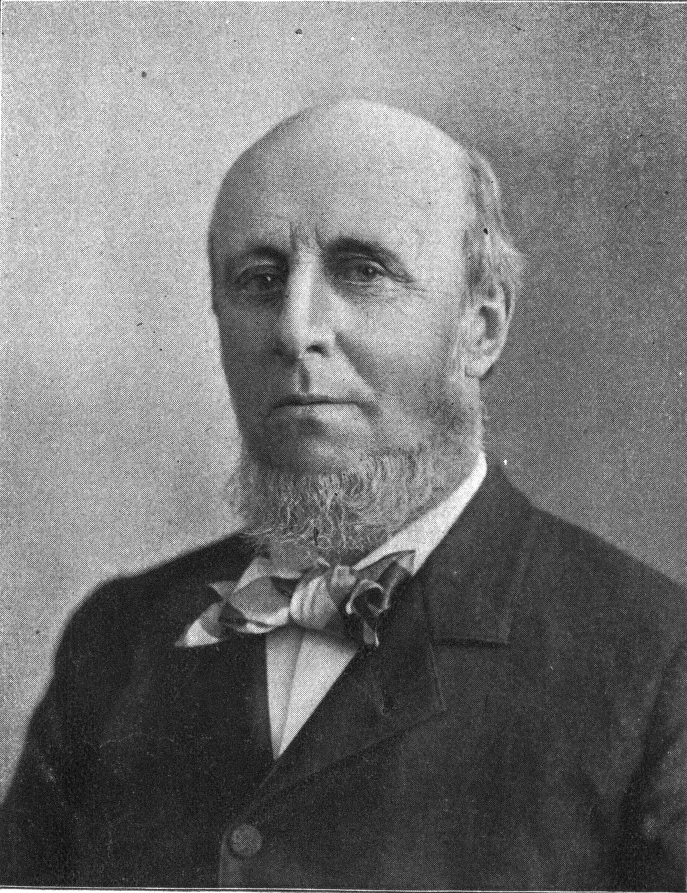
In a speech after the Cornell game, University President James B. Angell said the benefit of the victory was in the cultivation of a "broad, generous university spirit" that "makes us feel here one interest and common joy."

The victory over Cornell was the first by a Michigan football team against one of the elite Eastern football team, and "the Michigan men went wild" as blue and yellow were "all the colors that could be seen." One newspaper wrote that the victory placed Michigan among the top programs in football: "The victory places Michigan in the position of worthy foeman of Yale, Harvard, Princeton or Pennsylvania." The Detroit Free Press filled its front page with a lengthy account of the game under the headline, "GLORIOUS!", and proclaimed the start of "halcyon days at the university" and opined that "the day of logy teams, slow signalling and dumb playing at the university are but pages in history now." The Free Press predicted that the victory would mark a turning point in the popularity of football in the West, such that "it will become the only acknowledged game of the fall, and its devotees will outnumber those of any other game." The University of Michigan yearbook, The Palladium, wrote: "The enthusiasm of that day at Detroit transformed our foot ball team from the practically 'backwoods' organization that they were to skillful, scientific players of the great American game of foot ball. Let the good work go on."

On the Monday evening following the game, 3,000 students gathered for a mass meeting in University Hall to celebrate the victory. Speeches were delivered University President James Burrill Angell, Coach McCauley, team captain James Baird, and team manager Charles Baird. President Angell told the crowd, "I have been asked often today, 'What will be the effect of the game?' I am neither a prophet or the son of a prophet, but there is one thing of great value that I believe will result. . . . I think the benefit of victory lies in the cultivation of this broad, generous university spirit that pervades all departments and makes us feel here one interest and common joy." After the mass meeting, the students gathered until midnight around a large bonfire on the campus.

In December 1894, The Michigan Alumnus credited the victory over Cornell with the formation of permanent alumni associations in various cities:

"Michigan alumni all over the country are rejoicing because of our great victory over Cornell on the foot-ball field. It presages better days for athletics at the University, for it means that hereafter we may look for greater encouragement from the authorities and from the student body than ever before this. It is proving a new and powerful bond of union and sympathy among our alumni. Brought together, as in Buffalo, to celebrate this foot-ball victory, our graduates have felt the old fire of enthusiasm for their grand old University, and have formed permanent alumni associations, the value and importance of which is bound to be great."

=== Game 11: at Chicago ===
Michigan at Chicago

Team	1	2	Total
• Michigan	0	6	6
Chicago	4	0	4

- Date: November 29
- Location: Marshall Field, Chicago
- Game attendance: 5,000
- Referee: F.M. Gould (Amherst)

On Thanksgiving Day, November 29, 1894, Michigan closed its 1894 season with a 6–4 victory over Amos Alonzo Stagg's Chicago Maroons. The game was played before a crowd of 5,000 spectators at Marshall Field in Chicago.

An account published in the Detroit Free Press described the atmosphere surrounding the game: "The east and south sides of the field were lined with tally-hos, landaus, etc. Everyone wore the colors of one of the colleges. The yellow and blue of Michigan was as prominently displayed as was the maroon of Chicago. Everyone was out to yell for his respective team and from the noise it seemed as if pandemonium had been turned loose." Michigan's team was accompanied onto the field by "a little negro mascot" of 8 to 10 years who wore a uniform of blue on one side and yellow on the other.

Gale of Chicago scored the game's first touchdown at the 10-minute mark and missed the kick for goal from touchdown. Michigan drove deep into Chicago during the first half, but fumbled three times. The U. of M. Daily attributed the fumbles to "Chicago's peculiar way of tackling. Instead of getting the man, her tacklers would hit the ball out of the runner's hand, if possible." The first half ended with the score 4 to 0 in favor of Chicago.

Michigan won the game on a touchdown drive late in the second half that featured long runs by Senter and LeRoy. On the final play of the drive, Michigan focused its blocking on the center, and Ferbert ran around the end for the touchdown. Dyer kicked the goal after touchdown. Near the end of the game, Bloomingston narrowly missed a field goal attempt from the 40-yard line, with the ball passing just under the cross bar.

A controversy arose after the game as Michigan supporters charged that "Stagg had secured [Michigan]'s signals and made use of the knowledge, hoping to win by any means, however questionable." In another account, the Detroit Free Press complained of biased officiating by the umpire, Phil Allen, who was a cousin of Chicago's captain.

The game was Michigan's second consecutive Thanksgiving Day game against Chicago. The first game, in 1893, drew a crowd of 2,000, and in 1894, the attendance more than doubled. The large attendance solidified Chicago's status as Michigan's "natural rival," and The Michigan Alumnus reported that "all parties hope to make this game the leading athletic event of the west, but above all to have the contest manly and free from criticism."

Michigan's starting lineup in the game was Senter (left end), Villa (left tackle), Carr (left guard), Smith (center), Henninger (right guard), Hadden (right tackle), Price (right end), Baird (quarterback), Ferbert (left halfback), Dyer (right halfback), and Bloomingston (fullback). The sole substitutions for Michigan were Yont for Villa and Reynolds for Price. Price and Gale of Chicago were ejected from the game for "slugging."

=== After the season ===
After totaling seven wins in 1892 and again in 1893, Michigan's nine wins in 1894 marked the highest win total in Michigan football history to that time. In an article on Inter-Collegiate Athletics in the Middle West, Reuben M. Strong of Oberlin College wrote, "Michigan University, without doubt, deserves the honors of first place in foot-ball for '94. Wisconsin University would make a close second. Unfortunately the two did not meet, as Michigan is inclined to give more attention to the Eastern colleges of late."

In April 1895, the report by the treasurer of the University of Michigan Athletic Association showed a cash balance of $1,013.17. Receipts for the year totaled $5,613.17, with game receipts comprising $4,100. Expenditures included $3,350 for "trips and foot-ball expenses," $560 for a coach, $440 for the training table, and $150 for printing.

== Personnel ==
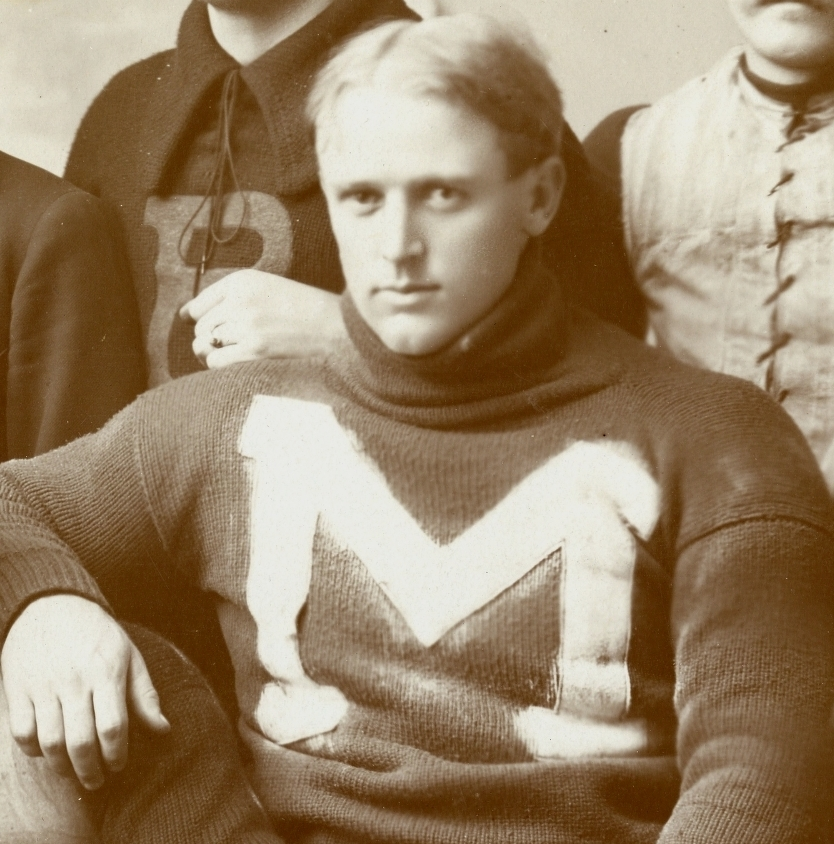
Guard Bert Carr from Cedar Spring, Michigan

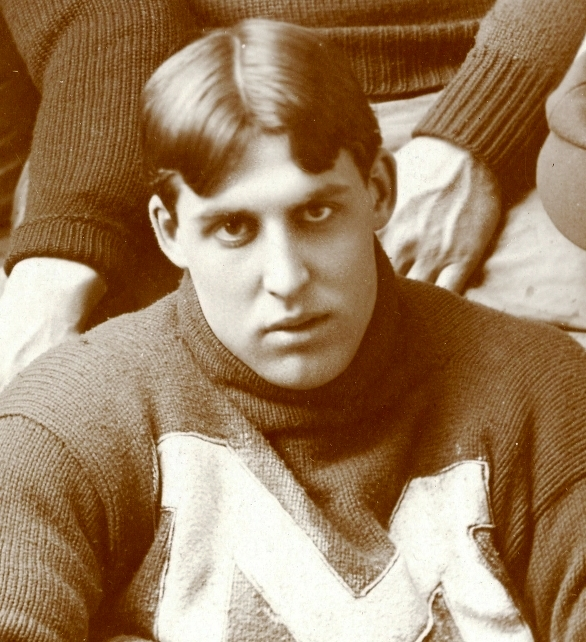
End H. G. Hadden became the head football coach at Notre Dame in 1895.

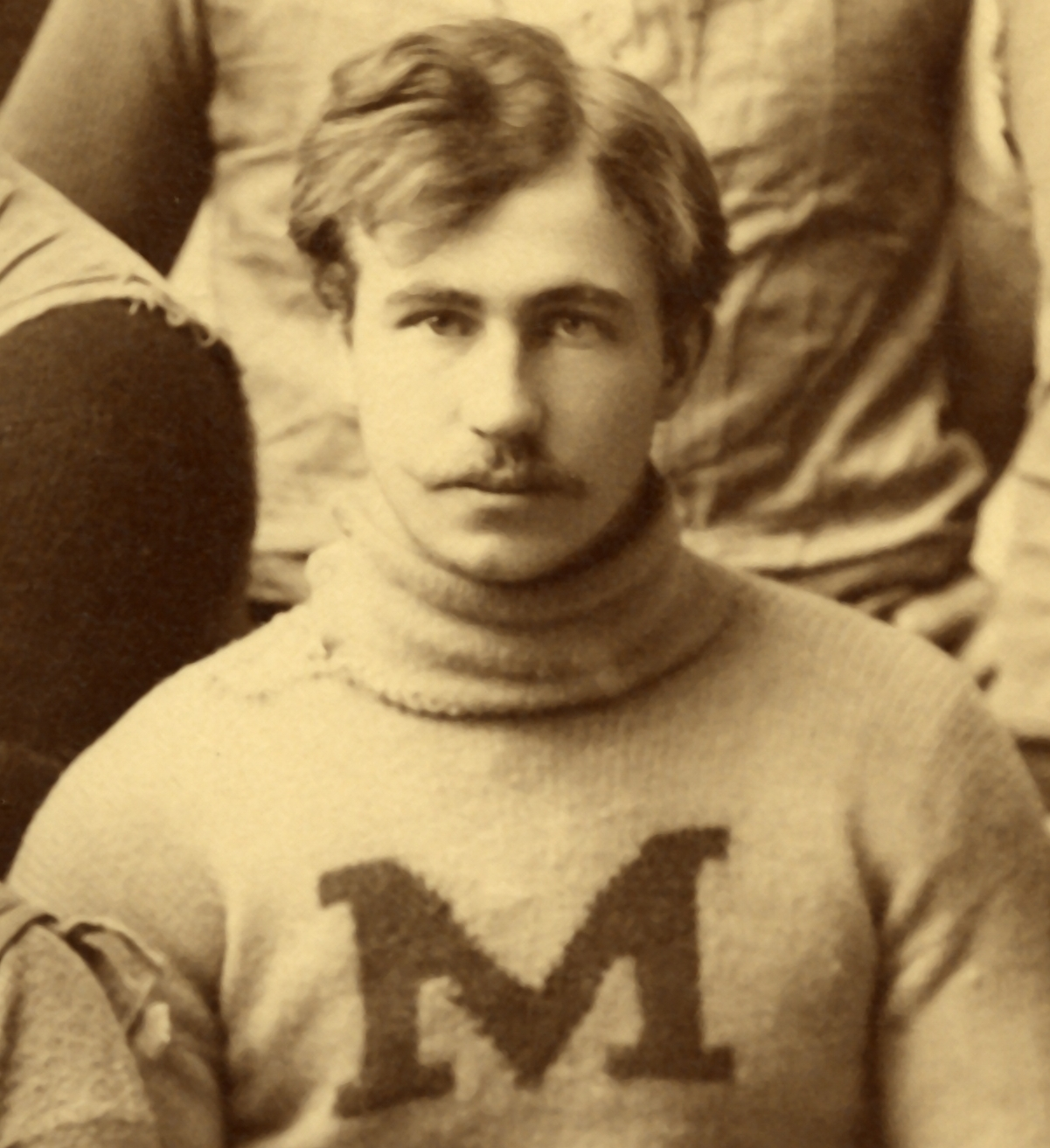
Halfback George Dygert played five years of football at Michigan from 1890 to 1894.

=== Varsity ===
The following 22 players received varsity letters for their participation on Michigan's 1894 football team. Players who started at least six games are displayed in bold.

- **James Baird**, Vanceburg, Kentucky/Chicago, Illinois – started 6 games at quarterback
- **John A. Bloomingston**, Chicago, Illinois – started 6 game at right halfback, 2 games at left halfback, and 2 game at fullback
- **Bert Carr**, Cedar Spring, Michigan – started 7 games at left guard, 1 game at left tackle
- **Horace Dyer**, St. Louis, Missouri – started 6 games at fullback, 1 game at right halfback
- George Dygert, Ann Arbor, Michigan – started 3 games at fullback, 1 game at left halfback, 1 game at right halfback
- **Gustave Ferbert**, Cleveland, Ohio – started 6 games at left halfback, 3 games at quarterback
- Raynor Freund, Reserve, Montana – halfback
- George Greenleaf, Brazil, Indiana – started 4 games at left end, 1 game at quarterback
- **H. G. Hadden**, Chicago, Illinois – started 4 games at right end, 3 games at right tackle, 2 games at left end,
- Ralph W. E. Hayes, Galva, Illinois – started 1 game at right tackle
- **Frederick W. Henninger**, Barberton, Ohio – started all 11 games at right guard
- Herman B. Leonard, Bloomington, Illinois – halfback
- Clare LeRoy, Ann Arbor, Michigan – halfback
- Daniel Ninde, Wayne, Indiana – started 3 games at left guard
- **Gilmore D. Price**, Fort Sheridan, Idaho – started 7 games at right end
- John W. Reynolds, Sr., Detroit, Michigan – started 2 games at right tackle, 1 game at left tackle
- J. De Forest Richards – started 2 games at right halfback, 2 games at left halfback
- Warren Rundell, Flint, Michigan – started 1 game at center
- Henry M. Senter, Houghton, Michigan – started 4 games at left end
- **C.H. Smith** – started 10 games at center
- **Frank Villa**, Walla Walla, Washington – started 8 games at left tackle
- **Jesse Grant Yont**, Brock, Nebraska – started 5 games at right tackle, 1 game at right halfback

=== Reserves ===
- Archie Ernest Bartlett, Cardington, Ohio – end
- Phillip D. Bourland, Peoria, Illinois
- Edwin Denby, Detroit, Michigan
- Thaddeus Loomis Farnham, Rosford, Ohio
- Neil Gates, Ann Arbor, Michigan
- Willard W. Griffin, Wenona
- Evans Holbrook, Onawa, Iowa
- Loomis Hutchinson, Ceresco, Michigan
- George A. Marston, Bay City, Michigan
- Elbert Nicholson, Kalamazoo, Michigan
- James M. Raikes, Burlington, Iowa
- Francis Joseph Welsh, Ann Arbor, Michigan – end

=== Coaching and training staff ===
- Coach: William McCauley
- Trainer: Keene Fitzpatrick
- Manager: Charles A. Baird
