= 1894 Ohio Green and White football team =

American college football season

1894 Ohio Green and White football
- Conference: Independent
- Record: 0–1
- Head coach: None

1894 Midwestern college football independents records
	Conf.			Overall
Team	W	L	T	W		L		T
Western Reserve		–		7	–	0	–	0
North Dakota Agricultural		–		2	–	0	–	0
Baldwin–Wallace		–		1	–	0	–	0
Buchtel		–		1	–	0	–	0
Michigan		–		9	–	1	–	1
Iowa Agricultural		–		5	–	1	–	0
College Of Emporia		–		4	–	1	–	0
Minnesota		–		3	–	1	–	0
Washburn		–		3	–	1	–	0
Wittenberg		–		6	–	2	–	0
Doane		–		5	–	2	–	0
Wisconsin		–		5	–	2	–	0
Notre Dame		–		3	–	1	–	1
Beloit		–		6	–	3	–	0
Washington University		–		2	–	1	–	0
Chicago		–		14	–	7	–	1
Kalamazoo		–		2	–	1	–	1
Ohio State		–		6	–	5	–	0
Case		–		4	–	3	–	0
Illinois		–		4	–	3	–	0
Oberlin		–		4	–	3	–	1
Cincinnati		–		3	–	3	–	0
Drake		–		2	–	2	–	0
Mount Union		–		4	–	5	–	0
Lake Forest		–		3	–	4	–	0
Miami (OH)		–		1	–	2	–	0
Ohio Wesleyan		–		1	–	3	–	0
Rush Medical		–		3	–	6	–	0
Northwestern		–		1	–	5	–	0
Ohio		–		0	–	1	–	0
South Dakota		–		0	–	2	–	0

The 1894 Ohio Green and White football team was an American football team that represented Ohio University as an independent during the 1894 college football season. In its first season of intercollegiate football, Ohio compiled a 0–1 record. The first and only game of the season was played on November 24 with the Ohio team losing by an 8–0 score to Marietta. The university organized its first football team in 1892, but did not play any games until its 1894 match with Marietta.

== Schedule ==
Date	Opponent	Site	Result	Source
November 24	Marietta	Athens, OH	L 0–8	
