= 1894 Notre Dame football team =

American college football season

1894 Notre Dame football
- Conference: Independent
- Record: 3–1–1
- Head coach: James L. Morrison (1st season)
- Captain: Frank Keough
- Home stadium: Brownson Hall field

1894 Midwestern college football independents records
	Conf.			Overall
Team	W	L	T	W		L		T
Western Reserve		–		7	–	0	–	0
North Dakota Agricultural		–		2	–	0	–	0
Baldwin–Wallace		–		1	–	0	–	0
Buchtel		–		1	–	0	–	0
Michigan		–		9	–	1	–	1
Iowa Agricultural		–		5	–	1	–	0
College Of Emporia		–		4	–	1	–	0
Minnesota		–		3	–	1	–	0
Washburn		–		3	–	1	–	0
Wittenberg		–		6	–	2	–	0
Doane		–		5	–	2	–	0
Wisconsin		–		5	–	2	–	0
Notre Dame		–		3	–	1	–	1
Beloit		–		6	–	3	–	0
Washington University		–		2	–	1	–	0
Chicago		–		14	–	7	–	1
Kalamazoo		–		2	–	1	–	1
Ohio State		–		6	–	5	–	0
Case		–		4	–	3	–	0
Illinois		–		4	–	3	–	0
Oberlin		–		4	–	3	–	1
Cincinnati		–		3	–	3	–	0
Drake		–		2	–	2	–	0
Mount Union		–		4	–	5	–	0
Lake Forest		–		3	–	4	–	0
Miami (OH)		–		1	–	2	–	0
Ohio Wesleyan		–		1	–	3	–	0
Rush Medical		–		3	–	6	–	0
Northwestern		–		1	–	5	–	0
Ohio		–		0	–	1	–	0
South Dakota		–		0	–	2	–	0

The 1894 Notre Dame football team was an American football team that represented the University of Notre Dame as an independent during the 1894 college football season. In its first season with a coach, James L. Morrison, the team compiled a 3–1–1 record and outscored opponents by a combined total of 80 to 31.

== Schedule ==
Date	Opponent	Site	Result	Source
October 13	Hillsdale	Brownson Hall field; Notre Dame, IN	W 14–0	
October 20	Albion	Brownson Hall field; Notre Dame, IN	T 6–6	
November 15	Wabash	Brownson Hall field; Notre Dame, IN	W 30–0	
November 22	Rush Medical	Brownson Hall field; Notre Dame, IN	W 18–6	
November 29	Albion	Brownson Hall field; Notre Dame, IN	L 12–19	
