= 1894 Western Reserve football team =

American college football season

1894 Western Reserve football
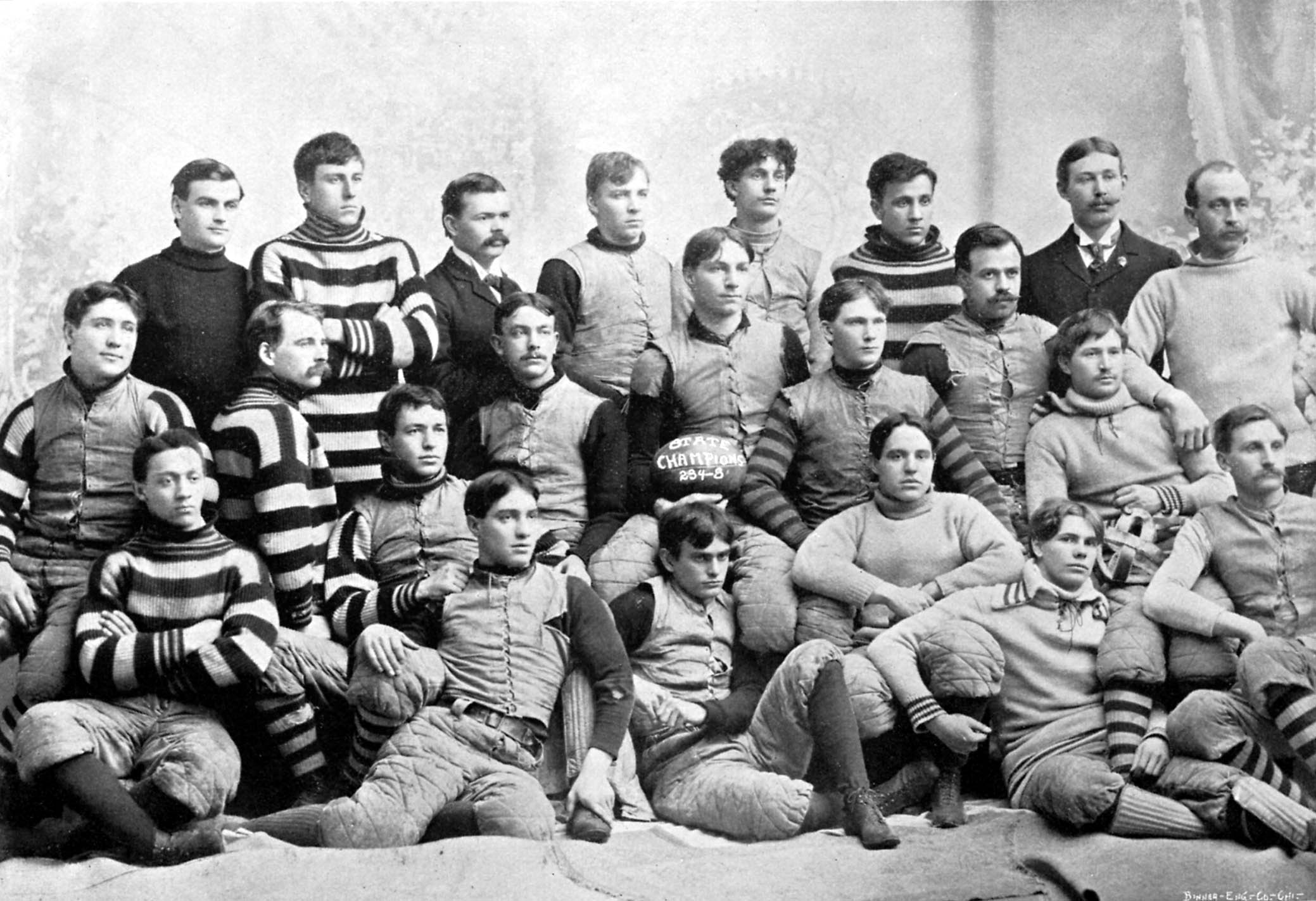
- Conference: Independent
- Record: 7–0
- Head coach: Charles O. Jenkins (1st season)
- Captain: Henry Scott Stewart

1894 Midwestern college football independents records
	Conf.			Overall
Team	W	L	T	W		L		T
Western Reserve		–		7	–	0	–	0
North Dakota Agricultural		–		2	–	0	–	0
Baldwin–Wallace		–		1	–	0	–	0
Buchtel		–		1	–	0	–	0
Michigan		–		9	–	1	–	1
Iowa Agricultural		–		5	–	1	–	0
College Of Emporia		–		4	–	1	–	0
Minnesota		–		3	–	1	–	0
Washburn		–		3	–	1	–	0
Wittenberg		–		6	–	2	–	0
Doane		–		5	–	2	–	0
Wisconsin		–		5	–	2	–	0
Notre Dame		–		3	–	1	–	1
Beloit		–		6	–	3	–	0
Washington University		–		2	–	1	–	0
Chicago		–		14	–	7	–	1
Kalamazoo		–		2	–	1	–	1
Ohio State		–		6	–	5	–	0
Case		–		4	–	3	–	0
Illinois		–		4	–	3	–	0
Oberlin		–		4	–	3	–	1
Cincinnati		–		3	–	3	–	0
Drake		–		2	–	2	–	0
Mount Union		–		4	–	5	–	0
Lake Forest		–		3	–	4	–	0
Miami (OH)		–		1	–	2	–	0
Ohio Wesleyan		–		1	–	3	–	0
Rush Medical		–		3	–	6	–	0
Northwestern		–		1	–	5	–	0
Ohio		–		0	–	1	–	0
South Dakota		–		0	–	2	–	0

The 1894 Western Reserve football team represented Western Reserve University—known as Case Western Reserve University—in the American city of Cleveland, Ohio, during the 1894 college football season. The team's coach was Charles O. Jenkins and captain was Henry Scott Stewart. The team was managed by future Cleveland Mayor William R. Hopkins. One notable player was Tug Wilson. Another member for the team was Charles N. Crosby.

The team outscored opponents by a combined 232–8, including defeating John Heisman's Oberlin Yeomen. The football rivalry against Case began with the first ever match up on Thanksgiving and the first time the game was played at League Park.

== Schedule ==
Date	Time	Opponent	Site	Result	Source
October 13		at Hiram	Hiram, OH	W 30–0	
October 20		at Mount Union	Alliance, OH	W 32–0	
October 27		at Ohio State	Recreation Park; Columbus, OH	W 24–4	
November 7		Oberlin	Cleveland, OH	W 22–4	
November 17		at Cleveland Athletic Club	Cleveland, OH	W 60–0	
November 24		Kenyon	Clarke Field; Cleveland, OH	W 40–0	
November 29	11:30 a.m.	Case	League Park; Cleveland, OH	W 24–0	
