= 1894 Oberlin Yeomen football team =

American college football season

1894 Oberlin Yeomen football
- Conference: Independent
- Record: 4–3–1
- Head coach: John Heisman (2nd season)
- Captain: C. K. Fauver

1894 Midwestern college football independents records
	Conf.			Overall
Team	W	L	T	W		L		T
Western Reserve		–		7	–	0	–	0
North Dakota Agricultural		–		2	–	0	–	0
Baldwin–Wallace		–		1	–	0	–	0
Buchtel		–		1	–	0	–	0
Michigan		–		9	–	1	–	1
Iowa Agricultural		–		5	–	1	–	0
College Of Emporia		–		4	–	1	–	0
Minnesota		–		3	–	1	–	0
Washburn		–		3	–	1	–	0
Wittenberg		–		6	–	2	–	0
Doane		–		5	–	2	–	0
Wisconsin		–		5	–	2	–	0
Notre Dame		–		3	–	1	–	1
Beloit		–		6	–	3	–	0
Washington University		–		2	–	1	–	0
Chicago		–		14	–	7	–	1
Kalamazoo		–		2	–	1	–	1
Ohio State		–		6	–	5	–	0
Case		–		4	–	3	–	0
Illinois		–		4	–	3	–	0
Oberlin		–		4	–	3	–	1
Cincinnati		–		3	–	3	–	0
Drake		–		2	–	2	–	0
Mount Union		–		4	–	5	–	0
Lake Forest		–		3	–	4	–	0
Miami (OH)		–		1	–	2	–	0
Ohio Wesleyan		–		1	–	3	–	0
Rush Medical		–		3	–	6	–	0
Northwestern		–		1	–	5	–	0
Ohio		–		0	–	1	–	0
South Dakota		–		0	–	2	–	0

The 1894 Oberlin Yeomen football team represented Oberlin College during the 1894 college football season. In its second and final season under head coach John Heisman, the team compiled a record of 4–3–1.

== Schedule ==
Date	Opponent	Site	Result	Attendance	Source
October 13	Kenyon	Oberlin, OH	W 38–0		
October 20	Wittenberg	Oberlin, OH	W 12–0		
October 27	at Washington & Jefferson	Washington, PA	T 0–0		
November 3	at Case	League Park; Cleveland, OH	W 20–6		
November 7	Western Reserve	Oberlin, OH	L 4–22		
November 17	at Michigan	Regents Field; Ann Arbor, MI	L 6–14	1,200–2,200	
November 24	Penn State	Oberlin, OH	L 6–9		
	Mount Union		W 67–0		
