= 1894 Chicago Maroons football team =

American college football season

1894 Chicago Maroons football
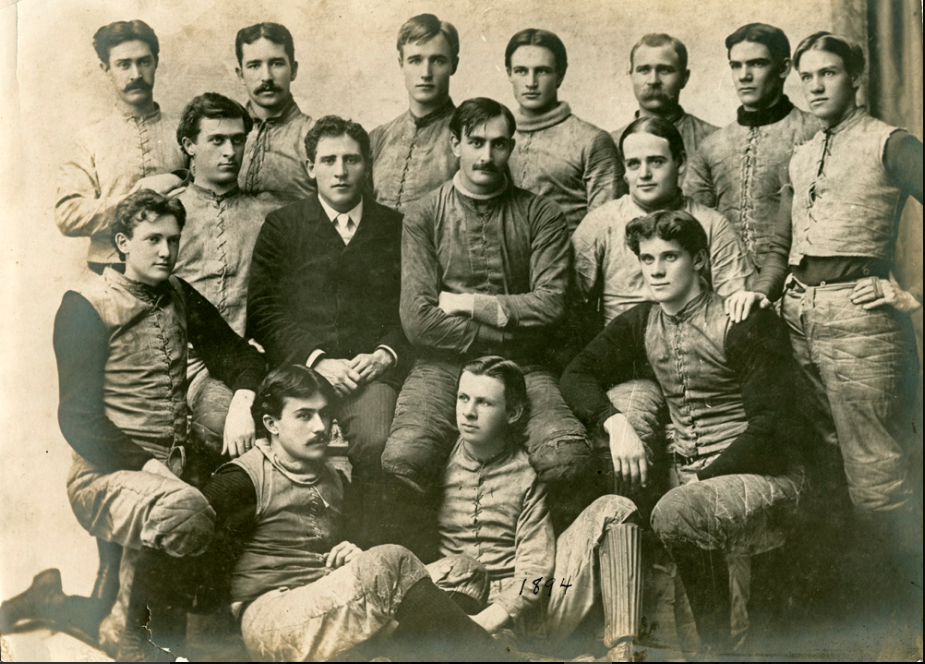
- Conference: Independent
- Record: 14–7–1
- Head coach: Amos Alonzo Stagg (3rd season)
- Base defense: 7–2–2
- Captain: Charles William Allen
- Home stadium: Marshall Field

1894 Midwestern college football independents records
	Conf.			Overall
Team	W	L	T	W		L		T
Western Reserve		–		7	–	0	–	0
North Dakota Agricultural		–		2	–	0	–	0
Baldwin–Wallace		–		1	–	0	–	0
Buchtel		–		1	–	0	–	0
Michigan		–		9	–	1	–	1
Iowa Agricultural		–		5	–	1	–	0
College Of Emporia		–		4	–	1	–	0
Minnesota		–		3	–	1	–	0
Washburn		–		3	–	1	–	0
Wittenberg		–		6	–	2	–	0
Doane		–		5	–	2	–	0
Wisconsin		–		5	–	2	–	0
Notre Dame		–		3	–	1	–	1
Beloit		–		6	–	3	–	0
Washington University		–		2	–	1	–	0
Chicago		–		14	–	7	–	1
Kalamazoo		–		2	–	1	–	1
Ohio State		–		6	–	5	–	0
Case		–		4	–	3	–	0
Illinois		–		4	–	3	–	0
Oberlin		–		4	–	3	–	1
Cincinnati		–		3	–	3	–	0
Drake		–		2	–	2	–	0
Mount Union		–		4	–	5	–	0
Lake Forest		–		3	–	4	–	0
Miami (OH)		–		1	–	2	–	0
Ohio Wesleyan		–		1	–	3	–	0
Rush Medical		–		3	–	6	–	0
Northwestern		–		1	–	5	–	0
Ohio		–		0	–	1	–	0
South Dakota		–		0	–	2	–	0

The 1894 Chicago Maroons football team represented the University of Chicago during the 1894 college football season. The Maroons played a record number of games over the course of the season, though they did not win a record number of games and considered many of their contests in August and September as practices.

== Schedule ==
Date	Time	Opponent	Site	Result	Attendance	Source
August 31		Chicago Dining Club	Marshall Field; Chicago, IL	W 4–0		
September 8		Englewood High School	Marshall Field; Chicago, IL	W 32–0		
September 15		Englewood High School	Marshall Field; Chicago, IL	W 22–0		
September 22		Manual Training High School	Marshall Field; Chicago, IL	W 46–0		
September 29	3:00 p.m.	Chicago Athletic Association	Marshall Field; Chicago, IL	L 4–12	3,000	
October 6		Northwestern	Marshall Field; Chicago, IL	W 46–0		
October 10		Rush Medical	Marshall Field; Chicago, IL	W 16–6		
October 13		Beloit	Marshall Field; Chicago, IL	W 16–0		
October 17		Chicago Athletic Association Seconds	Marshall Field; Chicago, IL	W 20–0		
October 20		Wisconsin	Marshall Field; Chicago, IL	L 0–30		
October 24		Chicago Athletic Association	Marshall Field; Chicago, IL	L 0–30		
October 27		Iowa	Marshall Field; Chicago, IL	T 18–18		
October 31		Prairie Athletic Club	Marshall Field; Chicago, IL	W 26–0		
November 3		Purdue	Marshall Field; Chicago, IL (rivalry)	L 6–10		
November 6		Englewood YMCA	Marshall Field; Chicago, IL	W 4–0		
November 10		Lake Forest	Marshall Field; Chicago, IL	W 28–0		
November 24		at Northwestern	Evanston, IL	W 36–0		
November 29		Michigan	Marshall Field; Chicago, IL (rivalry)	L 4–6	6,000	
December 25		vs. Stanford	Haight Street Grounds; San Francisco, CA	W 24–4	4,000	
December 29		vs. Stanford	Athletic Park; Los Angeles, CA	L 0–12		
January 1		vs. Reliance Athletic Club	San Francisco, CA	L 0–6		
January 4		at Salt Lake YMCA	Salt Lake City, UT	W 52–0		

== Roster ==
Player	Position
Charles William Allen (captain)	right tackle, left end, halfback
Horace Webster Black
Henry Thurston Chace	right end
Henry Gordon Gale	fullback
Walter Eugene Garrey	right end
Frank Earle Hering	quarterback
Clarence Bert Herschberger	fullback
George Nelson Knapp	right guard
John Lemay	left end
Frederick Day Nichols	right halfback
Charles Foster Roby	right end
William Rullkoetter	left guard
Robert Newton Tooker
Emery Roscoe Yundt

- Head coach: Amos Alonzo Stagg (3rd year at Chicago)
