= Moses W. Games =

American football coach

Biographical details
- Born: March 23, 1873; Lawrence, Kansas, U.S.
- Died: May 1, 1934 (aged 61); Lawrence, Kansas, U.S.

Playing career
- 1892–1893: Baker
- Position: End

Coaching career (HC unless noted)
- 1894: Washburn

Head coaching record
- Overall: 3–1

Moses William Games (March 23, 1873 – May 1, 1934) was an American college football player and coach. He served as the head football coach at Washburn University in Topeka, Kansas for one season, in 1894, compiling a record of 3–1.

A native of Baldwin City, Kansas, Games played football at Baker University for two seasons, in 1892 and 1893, as an end. Games was a teacher in Olathe, Kansas from 1895 to 1897. He graduated from the University of Kansas School of Law in 1898. In 1906, he was working as a United States veterinary inspector.

== Head coaching record ==
Year	Team	Overall	Conference	Standing	Bowl/playoffs
Washburn Ichabods (Independent) (1894)
1894	Washburn	3–1			
Washburn:		3–1			
Total:		3–1			
