= 1894 Rush Medical football team =

American college football season

1894 Rush Medical football
- Conference: Independent
- Record: 3–6
- Home stadium: West Side Park

1894 Midwestern college football independents records
	Conf.			Overall
Team	W	L	T	W		L		T
Western Reserve		–		7	–	0	–	0
North Dakota Agricultural		–		2	–	0	–	0
Baldwin–Wallace		–		1	–	0	–	0
Buchtel		–		1	–	0	–	0
Michigan		–		9	–	1	–	1
Iowa Agricultural		–		5	–	1	–	0
College Of Emporia		–		4	–	1	–	0
Minnesota		–		3	–	1	–	0
Washburn		–		3	–	1	–	0
Wittenberg		–		6	–	2	–	0
Doane		–		5	–	2	–	0
Wisconsin		–		5	–	2	–	0
Notre Dame		–		3	–	1	–	1
Beloit		–		6	–	3	–	0
Washington University		–		2	–	1	–	0
Chicago		–		14	–	7	–	1
Kalamazoo		–		2	–	1	–	1
Ohio State		–		6	–	5	–	0
Case		–		4	–	3	–	0
Illinois		–		4	–	3	–	0
Oberlin		–		4	–	3	–	1
Cincinnati		–		3	–	3	–	0
Drake		–		2	–	2	–	0
Mount Union		–		4	–	5	–	0
Lake Forest		–		3	–	4	–	0
Miami (OH)		–		1	–	2	–	0
Ohio Wesleyan		–		1	–	3	–	0
Rush Medical		–		3	–	6	–	0
Northwestern		–		1	–	5	–	0
Ohio		–		0	–	1	–	0
South Dakota		–		0	–	2	–	0

The 1894 Rush Medical football team was an American football team that represented Rush Medical College in the 1894 college football season.

== Schedule ==
Date	Time	Opponent	Site	Result	Source
October 6		at Prairie Athletic Club	Oak Park; Chicago, IL	W 12–0	
October 10		at Chicago	Marshall Field; Chicago, IL	L 6–16	
October 20	3:30 p.m.	Chicago Athletic Association	West Side Park; Chicago, IL	L 6–12	
October 27		at Beloit	Beloit, WI	L 12–22	
November 3	3:00 p.m.	Lake Forest	West Side Park; Chicago, IL	W 34–6	
November 10		Chicago YMCA	West Side Park; Chicago, IL	L 4–16	
November 17		at Grinnell	Grinnell, IA	L 6–38	
November 21	3:00 p.m.	Englewood High School	West Side Park; Chicago, IL		
November 22		at Notre Dame	Brownson Hall field; Notre Dame, IN	L 6–18 (or 6–12)	
November 29		at Monmouth (IL)	Monmouth, IL	W 18–6	

== Roster ==
1894 Rush Medical College Roster
Quarterbacks: Loomis- Chicago AA, Beloit, Grinnell, Notre Dame, Monmouth; Meloy- Prairie AC, Chicago; Price- Chicago YMCA; Right ends: Loomis- Prairie AC, Chicago; Moore- Chicago AA, Grinnell; Jackson-Notre Dame, Monmouth; Summers- Chicago, Beloit; Parker- Chicago YMCA; Left ends: McNary- Chicago, Chicago AA, Beloit, Grinnell, Notre Dame, Monmouth; Summers- Prairie AC; Loomis- Chicago YMCA	Right tackles: Coe- Prairie AC, Chicago YMCA, Notre Dame, Monmouth; Westridge- Chicago, Chicago AA, Beloit, Grinnell; Left tackle: Fullenweider- Chicago, Chicago AA, Chicago YMCA, Grinnell, Notre Dame, Monmouth; Westridge- Prairie AC; Moore- Beloit; Right guard: Smolt- Chicago, Chicago AA, Beloit, Grinnell, Notre Dame, Monmouth; Fullenweider- Prairie AC; Roasch- Chicago YMCA; Left guards: Skinner- Chicago AA, Beloit, Chicago YMCA; Barrett- Grinnell, Notre Dame; Jones- Prairie AC; White- Chicago	Centers: Duncan- Prairie AC, Chicago, Chicago AA, Beloit; Johnson- Grinnell, Notre Dame, Monmouth; Barrett- Chicago YMCA; Right half backs: Wagner- Chicago, Chicago AA, Beloit; Jewett- Grinnell, Notre Dame, Monmouth; Smith- Prairie AC; Done- Chicago; Meloy- Beloit; Summers- Chicago YMCA; Left half backs: Libbey- Prairie AC, Chicago, Chicago AA, Beloit, Grinnell, Notre Dame, Monmouth; Meloy- Chicago AA; Jackson- Chicago YMCA; Fullback: Sager- Prairie AC, Chicago, Chicago AA, Beloit, Grinnell, Notre Dame, Monmouth; Summers- Chicago; Whitehill- Chicago YMCA

- Rosters for the Lake Forest and Englewood High School games are unknown.
