= 1894 Wisconsin Badgers football team =

American college football season

1894 Wisconsin Badgers football
- Conference: Independent
- Record: 5–2
- Head coach: Hiram O. Stickney (1st season)
- Captain: Theron Lyman
- Home stadium: Randall Field

1894 Midwestern college football independents records
	Conf.			Overall
Team	W	L	T	W		L		T
Western Reserve		–		7	–	0	–	0
North Dakota Agricultural		–		2	–	0	–	0
Baldwin–Wallace		–		1	–	0	–	0
Buchtel		–		1	–	0	–	0
Michigan		–		9	–	1	–	1
Iowa Agricultural		–		5	–	1	–	0
College Of Emporia		–		4	–	1	–	0
Minnesota		–		3	–	1	–	0
Washburn		–		3	–	1	–	0
Wittenberg		–		6	–	2	–	0
Doane		–		5	–	2	–	0
Wisconsin		–		5	–	2	–	0
Notre Dame		–		3	–	1	–	1
Beloit		–		6	–	3	–	0
Washington University		–		2	–	1	–	0
Chicago		–		14	–	7	–	1
Kalamazoo		–		2	–	1	–	1
Ohio State		–		6	–	5	–	0
Case		–		4	–	3	–	0
Illinois		–		4	–	3	–	0
Oberlin		–		4	–	3	–	1
Cincinnati		–		3	–	3	–	0
Drake		–		2	–	2	–	0
Mount Union		–		4	–	5	–	0
Lake Forest		–		3	–	4	–	0
Miami (OH)		–		1	–	2	–	0
Ohio Wesleyan		–		1	–	3	–	0
Rush Medical		–		3	–	6	–	0
Northwestern		–		1	–	5	–	0
Ohio		–		0	–	1	–	0
South Dakota		–		0	–	2	–	0

The 1894 Wisconsin Badgers football team represented the University of Wisconsin as an independent during the 1894 college football season. Led by first-year head coach Hiram O. Stickney, the Badgers compiled a record of 5–2. The team's captain was Theron Lyman.

== Schedule ==
Date	Time	Opponent	Site	Result	Attendance	Source
October 6		Chicago Athletic Association	Randall Field; Madison, WI	W 22–4	1,500	
October 15		Purdue	Randall Field; Madison, WI	L 0–6 (forfeit)		
October 20		at Chicago	Marshall Field; Chicago, IL	W 30–0		
October 27	3:00 p.m.	at Chicago Athletic Association	South Side Park; Chicago, IL	L 4–16		
October 29		Iowa	Randall Field; Madison, WI (rivalry)	W 44–0		
November 3		at Beloit	Beloit, WI	W 46–0		
November 17		Minnesota	Randall Field; Madison, WI (rivalry)	W 6–0	4,000	
