= 1894 Washburn Ichabods football team =

American college football season

1894 Washburn Ichabods football
- Conference: Independent
- Record: 3–1
- Head coach: Moses W. Games (1st season)
- Home stadium: Washburn grounds

1894 Midwestern college football independents records
	Conf.			Overall
Team	W	L	T	W		L		T
Western Reserve		–		7	–	0	–	0
North Dakota Agricultural		–		2	–	0	–	0
Baldwin–Wallace		–		1	–	0	–	0
Buchtel		–		1	–	0	–	0
Michigan		–		9	–	1	–	1
Iowa Agricultural		–		5	–	1	–	0
College Of Emporia		–		4	–	1	–	0
Minnesota		–		3	–	1	–	0
Washburn		–		3	–	1	–	0
Wittenberg		–		6	–	2	–	0
Doane		–		5	–	2	–	0
Wisconsin		–		5	–	2	–	0
Notre Dame		–		3	–	1	–	1
Beloit		–		6	–	3	–	0
Washington University		–		2	–	1	–	0
Chicago		–		14	–	7	–	1
Kalamazoo		–		2	–	1	–	1
Ohio State		–		6	–	5	–	0
Case		–		4	–	3	–	0
Illinois		–		4	–	3	–	0
Oberlin		–		4	–	3	–	1
Cincinnati		–		3	–	3	–	0
Drake		–		2	–	2	–	0
Mount Union		–		4	–	5	–	0
Lake Forest		–		3	–	4	–	0
Miami (OH)		–		1	–	2	–	0
Ohio Wesleyan		–		1	–	3	–	0
Rush Medical		–		3	–	6	–	0
Northwestern		–		1	–	5	–	0
Ohio		–		0	–	1	–	0
South Dakota		–		0	–	2	–	0

The 1894 Washburn Ichabods football team represented Washburn College—now known as Washburn University—as an independent during the 1894 college football season. In their first and only season under head coach Moses W. Games, the Ichabods compiled a record of 3–1.

== Schedule ==
Date	Time	Opponent	Site	Result	Attendance	Source
October 27		at College of Emporia	Emporia, KS	W 16–4		
November 10	4:00 p.m.	Midland	Washburn grounds; Topeka,KS	W 42–0		
November 17	3:00 p.m.	at Midland	Midland College grounds; Atchison, KS	W 18–4		
November 23	3:30 p.m.	College of Emporia	Washburn grounds; Topeka, KS	L 0–22	500	
