= 1896 Michigan Agricultural Aggies football team =

American college football season

1896 Michigan Agricultural Aggies football
- Conference: Michigan Intercollegiate Athletic Association
- Record: 1–3–1 (0–3–1 MIAA)
- Head coach: None
- Captain: Wilfred R. Vanderhoef

The 1896 Michigan Agricultural Aggies football team represented Michigan Agricultural College (MAC)—now known as Michigan State University—as a member of the Michigan Intercollegiate Athletic Association (MIAA) during the 1896 college football season. The 1896 Aggies had no coach. The team compiled an overall record of 1–3–1 record with a mark of 0–3–1 in conference play.

Although teams representing MAC had played two games against nearby Alma College a decade earlier in 1886, the 1896 season was the first in which MAC fielded a varsity football team for a full season of play. The team opened the season with a 10–0 victory over Lansing High School on September 26. In the first intercollegiate game of the season, the Aggies lost to Kalamazoo by a 24 to 0 score on October 17. The Aggies then played Alma to a scoreless tie on November 7, before losing, 18–16, in a rematch with Alma a week later. MAC closed its season on Thanksgiving with a second loss to Kalamazoo.

== Schedule ==
Date	Time	Opponent	Site	Result	Attendance	Source
September 26		Lansing High School*	Eltom Park; Lansing, MI	W 10–0		
October 17		Kalamazoo	Lansing, MI	L 0–24		
November 7		Alma	Lansing, MI	T 0–0		
November 14		Alma	Alma, MI	L 16–18		
November 26	3:00 p.m.	at Kalamazoo	Recreation Park; Kalamazoo, MI	L 4–18	500	
*Non-conference game
