= W. Durant Berry =

American football coach (1870–1953)

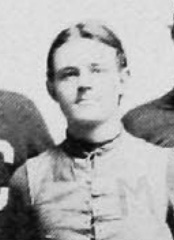
- Berry pictured in The Cincinnatian 1895, Cincinnati yearbook

Biographical details
- Born: September 3, 1870; Warren, Massachusetts, U.S.
- Died: July 9, 1953 (aged 82)

Coaching career (HC unless noted)
- 1891–1893: Centre
- 1894–1895: Cincinnati

Head coaching record
- Overall: 19–7

Walter Durant Berry (September 3, 1870 – July 9, 1953) was an American college football coach. He was the first head football coach at the University of Cincinnati, serving from 1894 to 1895 and compiling a record of 6–6. Berry later worked as a doctor in New England. In 1903, he married Helen Warren Upham.

Berry had previously been a head football coach at Centre College in Danville, Kentucky from 1981 to 1893, compiling a record of 13 wins and 1 loss. He died in 1953.

== Head coaching record ==
| Year | Team | Overall | Conference | Standing | Bowl/playoffs |
|---|---|---|---|---|---|
Centre (Independent) (1891–1893)
| 1891 | Centre | 4–0 | | | |
| 1892 | Centre | 6–0 | | | |
| 1893 | Centre | 4–1 | | | |
| Centre: | | 13–1 | | | |
Cincinnati (Independent) (1894–1895)
| 1894 | Cincinnati | 3–3 | | | |
| 1895 | Cincinnati | 3–3 | | | |
| Cincinnati: | | 6–6 | | | |
| Total: | | 19–7 | | | |
