= 1894 Ohio State Buckeyes football team =

American college football season

1894 Ohio State Buckeyes football
- Conference: Independent
- Record: 6–5
- Head coach: Jack Ryder (3rd season)
- Home stadium: Recreation Park

1894 Midwestern college football independents records
| | Conf. | | | Overall |
| Team | W | L | T | W | | L | | T |
|---|---|---|---|---|---|---|---|---|
| Western Reserve | | – | | 7 | – | 0 | – | 0 |
| North Dakota Agricultural | | – | | 2 | – | 0 | – | 0 |
| Baldwin–Wallace | | – | | 1 | – | 0 | – | 0 |
| Buchtel | | – | | 1 | – | 0 | – | 0 |
| Michigan | | – | | 9 | – | 1 | – | 1 |
| Iowa Agricultural | | – | | 5 | – | 1 | – | 0 |
| College Of Emporia | | – | | 4 | – | 1 | – | 0 |
| Minnesota | | – | | 3 | – | 1 | – | 0 |
| Washburn | | – | | 3 | – | 1 | – | 0 |
| Wittenberg | | – | | 6 | – | 2 | – | 0 |
| Doane | | – | | 5 | – | 2 | – | 0 |
| Wisconsin | | – | | 5 | – | 2 | – | 0 |
| Notre Dame | | – | | 3 | – | 1 | – | 1 |
| Beloit | | – | | 6 | – | 3 | – | 0 |
| Washington University | | – | | 2 | – | 1 | – | 0 |
| Chicago | | – | | 14 | – | 7 | – | 1 |
| Kalamazoo | | – | | 2 | – | 1 | – | 1 |
| Ohio State | | – | | 6 | – | 5 | – | 0 |
| Case | | – | | 4 | – | 3 | – | 0 |
| Illinois | | – | | 4 | – | 3 | – | 0 |
| Oberlin | | – | | 4 | – | 3 | – | 1 |
| Cincinnati | | – | | 3 | – | 3 | – | 0 |
| Drake | | – | | 2 | – | 2 | – | 0 |
| Mount Union | | – | | 4 | – | 5 | – | 0 |
| Lake Forest | | – | | 3 | – | 4 | – | 0 |
| Miami (OH) | | – | | 1 | – | 2 | – | 0 |
| Ohio Wesleyan | | – | | 1 | – | 3 | – | 0 |
| Rush Medical | | – | | 3 | – | 6 | – | 0 |
| Northwestern | | – | | 1 | – | 5 | – | 0 |
| Ohio | | – | | 0 | – | 1 | – | 0 |
| South Dakota | | – | | 0 | – | 2 | – | 0 |

The 1894 Ohio State Buckeyes football team represented Ohio State University in the 1894 college football season. They played all their home games at Recreation Park and were coached by Jack Ryder. The Buckeyes finished the season with a 6–5 record. It is the last time, Ohio State lost to the same team twice in a season. That still stands as of the 2024 season.

== Schedule ==
| Date | Time | Opponent | Site | Result | Source |
|---|---|---|---|---|---|
| September 5 | | vs. Buchtel | Ohio State Fair; Columbus, OH | L 6–12 | |
| September 7 | | vs. Wittenberg | Ohio State Fair; Columbus, OH | L 0–6 | |
| October 6 | | Antioch | Recreation Park; Columbus, OH | W 32–0 | |
| October 13 | | at Wittenberg | Springfield, OH | L 6–18 | |
| October 20 | | at Columbus Barracks | Recreation Park; Columbus, OH | W 30–0 | |
| October 27 | | Western Reserve | Recreation Park; Columbus, OH | L 4–24 | |
| November 3 | | Marietta | Recreation Park; Columbus, OH | W 10–4 | |
| November 10 | 2:30 p.m. | at Case | League Park; Cleveland, OH | L 0–38 | |
| November 17 | | at Cincinnati | League Park; Cincinnati, OH | W 6–4 | |
| November 24 | | 17th Regiment | Recreation Park; Columbus, OH | W 46–4 | |
| November 29 | | Kenyon | Recreation Park; Columbus, OH | W 20–4 | |
