= Kalamazoo football, 1892–1899 =

American college football seasons

The Kalamazoo football teams (later known as the Kalamazoo Hornets) represented Kalamazoo College in American football during the program's first decade from 1892 to 1899. Highlights include the following:

- On October 24, 1892, Kalamazoo played its first game of intercollegiate football, losing by a 20–4 score.
- In 1894, Kalamazoo won the first two games in program history, defeating teams from the Kalamazoo YMCA (16–0) and Three Rivers High School (36–0).
- In 1895, Kalamazoo won its first game against a college team, defeating Alma, 12–8.
- In 1896, Kalamazoo joined the Michigan Intercollegiate Athletic Association (MIAA) and twice defeated the team from Michigan Agricultural.
- In 1897, Kalamazoo won the MIAA championship with a 6–1 record, 6–0 in MIAA games.
- In 1898, Kalamazoo compiled a perfect 7–0 record and won its second consecutive MIAA championship.
- In 1899, Kalamazoo compiled a 5–1–2 record (4–0 in conference games) and won its third consecutive MIAA championship.

== 1892 ==
1892 Kalamazoo football
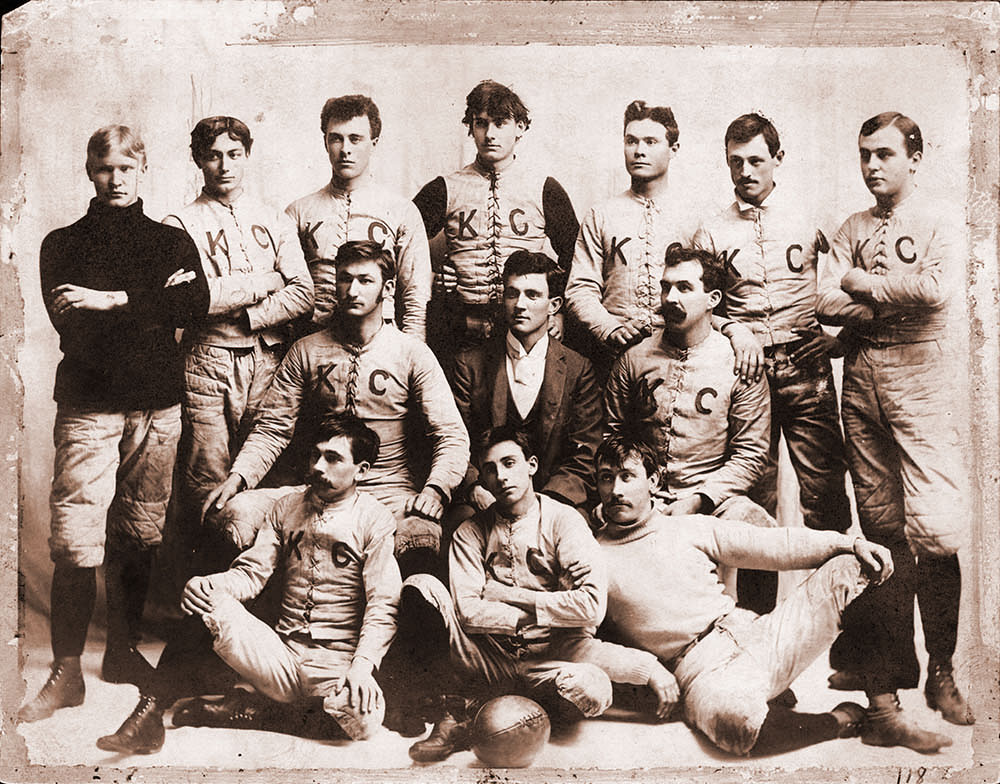
- Kalamazoo College's first football team, 1892. First row, left to right: Remington, Stripp, Shelvin. Second row: Weeler, McWilliams, Magill. Third row: Agbast, J. Westnedge, Gregg, Cole, Kinnane, Shutts, Lineau. Absent: R. Westnedge.
- Conference: Independent
- Record: 0–2
- Head coach: None
- Captain: Summer Remington

1892 Midwestern college football independents records
	Conf.			Overall
Team	W	L	T	W		L		T
Oberlin		–		7	–	0	–	0
Case		–		3	–	0	–	0
Iowa Agricultural		–		1	–	0	–	1
Notre Dame		–		1	–	0	–	1
Chicago		–		8	–	4	–	1
Michigan State Normal		–		2	–	1	–	0
Illinois		–		7	–	4	–	1
Ohio State		–		5	–	3	–	0
Washington University		–		3	–	2	–	0
Hillsdale		–		3	–	2	–	1
Doane		–		1	–	1	–	0
Heidelberg		–		1	–	1	–	0
Miami (OH)		–		2	–	2	–	0
Buchtel		–		3	–	4	–	0
Lake Forest		–		2	–	3	–	0
Cincinnati		–		1	–	2	–	0
Marquette		–		1	–	2	–	0
Ohio Wesleyan		–		1	–	3	–	0
Wittenberg		–		0	–	2	–	1
St. Ignatius College		–		0	–	1	–	0
Washburn		–		0	–	2	–	0
Kalamazoo		–		0	–	2	–	0

The 1892 Kalamazoo football team represented Kalamazoo College in the 1892 college football season. Summer Remington was the team captain.

In their first season fielding a football team, the Kalamazoo eleven lost two games against Olivet College, being outscored 32 to 8 by their opponent. The first game, played October 24 at Olivet, was planned as a part of Olivet's field day of 1892, which also included boxing matches, tennis, and track and field events like the hammer throw and pole vaulting. During the contest, Kalamazoo took an early 4–0 lead, but allowed 20 answered points, 8 in the first half and 12 in the second.

=== Schedule ===
Date	Opponent	Site	Result	Source
October 24	at Olivet	Olivet, MI	L 4–20	
November 3	Olivet	Fair grounds; Kalamazoo, MI	L 4–12	

== 1893 ==
1893 Kalamazoo football
- Conference: Independent
- Record: 0–2
- Head coach: None
- Captain: William Stripp

1893 Midwestern college football independents records
	Conf.			Overall
Team	W	L	T	W		L		T
Case		–		4	–	0	–	0
Miami (OH)		–		3	–	0	–	0
Baker		–		5	–	0	–	1
Oberlin		–		6	–	1	–	0
Hillsdale		–		4	–	1	–	0
Notre Dame		–		4	–	1	–	0
Buchtel		–		5	–	2	–	0
Butler		–		4	–	2	–	0
Michigan State Normal		–		4	–	2	–	0
Chicago		–		6	–	4	–	2
Beloit		–		4	–	3	–	0
Illinois		–		3	–	2	–	3
Lake Forest		–		3	–	2	–	3
Doane		–		2	–	2	–	0
Heidelberg		–		2	–	2	–	0
Kansas State Normal		–		1	–	1	–	0
Wabash		–		3	–	3	–	0
Washburn		–		1	–	1	–	1
Washington University		–		1	–	1	–	0
Ohio State		–		4	–	5	–	0
Wittenberg		–		2	–	3	–	0
Mount Union		–		1	–	2	–	0
Drake		–		0	–	2	–	1
Baldwin–Wallace		–		0	–	1	–	0
College of Emporia		–		0	–	1	–	0
Ohio Wesleyan		–		0	–	1	–	0
Kalamazoo		–		0	–	2	–	0
Iowa Agricultural		–		0	–	3	–	0
Cincinnati		–		0	–	6	–	0

The 1893 Kalamazoo football team represented Kalamazoo College as an independent during the 1893 college football season. William Stripp was the team captain.

=== Schedule ===
Date	Time	Opponent	Site	Result	Source
October 2		Olivet	Kalamazoo, MI	L 6–26	
October 26	3:20 p.m.	at Notre Dame	Brownson Hall field; Notre Dame, IN	L 0–34	

== 1894 ==
1894 Kalamazoo football
- Conference: Independent
- Record: 2–1–1
- Head coach: None
- Captain: Joseph Westnedge
- Home stadium: Lake View Park

1894 Midwestern college football independents records
	Conf.			Overall
Team	W	L	T	W		L		T
Western Reserve		–		7	–	0	–	0
North Dakota Agricultural		–		2	–	0	–	0
Baldwin–Wallace		–		1	–	0	–	0
Buchtel		–		1	–	0	–	0
Michigan		–		9	–	1	–	1
Iowa Agricultural		–		5	–	1	–	0
College Of Emporia		–		4	–	1	–	0
Minnesota		–		3	–	1	–	0
Washburn		–		3	–	1	–	0
Wittenberg		–		6	–	2	–	0
Doane		–		5	–	2	–	0
Wisconsin		–		5	–	2	–	0
Notre Dame		–		3	–	1	–	1
Beloit		–		6	–	3	–	0
Washington University		–		2	–	1	–	0
Chicago		–		14	–	7	–	1
Kalamazoo		–		2	–	1	–	1
Ohio State		–		6	–	5	–	0
Case		–		4	–	3	–	0
Illinois		–		4	–	3	–	0
Oberlin		–		4	–	3	–	1
Cincinnati		–		3	–	3	–	0
Drake		–		2	–	2	–	0
Mount Union		–		4	–	5	–	0
Lake Forest		–		3	–	4	–	0
Miami (OH)		–		1	–	2	–	0
Ohio Wesleyan		–		1	–	3	–	0
Rush Medical		–		3	–	6	–	0
Northwestern		–		1	–	5	–	0
Ohio		–		0	–	1	–	0
South Dakota		–		0	–	2	–	0

The 1894 Kalamazoo football team represented Kalamazoo College as an independent during the 1892 college football season. The compiled a record of 2–1–1. Joseph Westnedge was the team captain.

=== Schedule ===
Date	Time	Opponent	Site	Result	Attendance	Source
October 3		vs. Kalamzoo second team	Kalamazoo, MI	W 10–4 (practice)		
November 3		at Three Rivers High School	Three Rivers, MI	W 36–0		
November 10		at Olivet	Lake View Park; Kalamazoo, MI	Cancelled		
November 24		Hillsdale	Lake View Park; Kalamazoo, MI	L 0–66	200	
November 29	2:45 p.m.	Kalamazoo High School	Lake View Park; Kalamazoo, MI	T 16–16	200	
		Kalamazoo YMCA		W 16–0		

== 1895 ==
1895 Kalamazoo football
- Conference: Independent
- Record: 1–1
- Head coach: None
- Captain: Richard Westnedge

1895 Midwestern college football independents records
	Conf.			Overall
Team	W	L	T	W		L		T
Miami (OH)		–		3	–	0	–	0
Carthage		–		2	–	0	–	0
Washington University		–		2	–	0	–	0
Michigan		–		8	–	1	–	0
Chicago		–		10	–	3	–	0
Wittenberg		–		5	–	2	–	0
Minnesota		–		7	–	3	–	0
Wisconsin		–		5	–	2	–	1
Wabash		–		6	–	3	–	0
Baldwin–Wallace		–		3	–	1	–	0
Notre Dame		–		3	–	1	–	0
Illinois		–		4	–	2	–	1
Buchtel		–		3	–	2	–	0
College of Emporia		–		3	–	2	–	0
Doane		–		3	–	2	–	0
Chicago P&S		–		3	–	2	–	1
Purdue		–		4	–	3	–	0
Indiana		–		4	–	3	–	1
Northwestern		–		6	–	5	–	0
Butler		–		2	–	2	–	0
Cincinnati		–		3	–	3	–	0
Kalamazoo		–		1	–	1	–	0
Michigan State Normal		–		3	–	3	–	0
North Dakota Agricultural		–		1	–	1	–	0
North Dakota		–		1	–	1	–	0
Ohio State		–		4	–	4	–	2
Iowa Agricultural		–		3	–	4	–	0
Ohio		–		2	–	3	–	0
Rush-Lake Forest		–		4	–	6	–	0
Ohio Wesleyan		–		2	–	4	–	1
Haskell		–		1	–	2	–	0
Iowa State Normal		–		1	–	2	–	0
Lake Forest		–		1	–	2	–	0
Northwestern Law		–		1	–	2	–	0
Drake		–		1	–	4	–	0

The 1895 Kalamazoo football team compiled a 1–1 record and was outscored by opponents 46 to 12. Richard Westnedge was the team captain.

=== Schedule ===
Date	Time	Opponent	Site	Result	Source
October 3		at Olivet	Olivet, MI	L 0–38	
October 19	2:45	vs. Alma	Recreation Park; Grand Rapids, MI	W 12–8	

== 1896 ==
1896 Kalamazoo football
- Conference: Michigan Intercollegiate Athletic Association
- Record: 3–1–1 (2–1 MIAA)
- Head coach: None
- Captain: Charles Hall
- Home stadium: Recreation Park

The 1896 Kalamazoo football team represented Kalamazoo College as a member of the Michigan Intercollegiate Athletic Association (MIAA). The team compiled a 3–1–1 record (2–1 in conference games) and outscored opponents by opponents 68 to 14. Charles Hall was the team captain.

=== Schedule ===
Date	Time	Opponent	Site	Result	Attendance	Source
October 8		Kalamazoo High School*	Kalamazoo, MI	T 0–0	1,000	
October 17		at Michigan Agricultural	Lansing, MI	W 24–0		
November 14		at Albion	Albion, MI	L 4–6		
November 21	2:30 p.m.	Ionia Athletic Association*	Recreation Park; Kalamazoo, MI	W 22–4	200	
November 26	3:00 p.m.	Michigan Agricultural	Recreation Park; Kalamazoo, MI	W 18–4	500	
*Non-conference game

== 1897 ==
1897 Kalamazoo football

MIAA champion
- Conference: Michigan Intercollegiate Athletic Association
- Record: 6–1 (6–0 MIAA)
- Head coach: Charles Hall (1st season)
- Captain: Maurice Waterbury
- Home stadium: Recreation Park

The 1897 Kalamazoo football team represented Kalamazoo College as a member of the Michigan Intercollegiate Athletic Association (MIAA) during the 1897 college football season. Led by first-year head coach Charles Hall, Kalamazoo compiled an overall record of 6–1 with a mark of 6–0 in conference games, winning the MIAA title. Maurice Waterbury was the team captain.

=== Schedule ===
Date	Time	Opponent	Site	Result	Attendance	Source
October 9		at Michigan Agricultural	Lansing, MI	W 28–0		
October 16		Albion	Recreation Park; Kalamazoo, MI	W 58–0	200	
October 25		Olivet	Recreation Park; Kalamazoo, MI	W 60–0	450	
November 6		at Olivet	Olivet, MI	W 32–0		
November 13		at Albion	Albion, MI	W 26–10		
November 20	3:00 p.m.	at Detroit Athletic Club*	Detroit Athletic Club grounds; Detroit, MI	L 16–18		
November 25	2:45 p.m.	at Michigan State Normal	Ypsilanti, MI	W 16–0		
*Non-conference game

== 1898 ==
1898 Kalamazoo football

MIAA champion
- Conference: Michigan Intercollegiate Athletic Association
- Record: 7–0 (5–0 MIAA)
- Head coach: Charles Hall (2nd season)
- Captain: Maurice Waterbury

1898 Michigan Intercollegiate Athletic Association football standings
	Conf.					Overall
Team	W		L		T	W		L		T
Kalamazoo $	5	–	0	–	0	7	–	0	–	0
Hillsdale	2	–	0	–	0	4	–	1	–	0
Michigan Agricultural	4	–	1	–	0	4	–	3	–	0
Michigan State Normal	0	–	3	–	0	1	–	5	–	2
Olivet	0	–	3	–	0	0	–	5	–	0
Albion	0	–	4	–	0	1	–	6	–	0
$ – Conference champion

The 1898 Kalamazoo football team represented Kalamazoo College as a member of the Michigan Intercollegiate Athletic Association (MIAA) during the 1898 college football season. The team compiled a 7-0 record (5–0 in conference games), outscored opponents by opponents 110 to 16, and won the MIAA championship. Maurice Waterbury was the team captain.

=== Schedule ===
Date	Time	Opponent	Site	Result	Attendance	Source
October 15		at White Pigeon*	White Pigeon, MI	W 8–5		
October 22		at Plainwell High School*	Plainwell, MI	W 11–6		
October 24		Olivet	Kalamazoo, MI	W 17–0		
November 5		at Albion	Albion, MI	W 11–0		
November 12		Albion	Kalamazoo, MI	W 25–0		
November 19		at Olivet	Olivet, MI	W 24–5		
November 24	2:30 p.m.	Michigan Agricultural	Kalamazoo, MI	W 17–0	1,000	
*Non-conference game

== 1899 ==
1899 Kalamazoo football

MIAA champion
- Conference: Michigan Intercollegiate Athletic Association
- Record: 6–1–2 (5–0 MIAA)
- Head coach: Charles Hall (3rd season)
- Captain: John Hoag

The 1899 Kalamazoo football team represented Kalamazoo College as a member of the Michigan Intercollegiate Athletic Association (MIAA) during the 1899 college football season. Led by third-year head coach Charles Hall, Kalamazoo compiled an overall record of 6–1–2 with a mark of 5–0 in conference play, winning the MIAA title for the third consecutive season. John Hoag was the team captain.

Kalamazoo was undefeated prior to its November 25 game with the Michigan Wolverines. It was the first time that the MIAA was given "a chance to see just how much Michigan is superior to her best team." Kalamazoo lost to the Wolverines but was credited with having shown "unexpected strength" in holding the Wolverines to 24 points.

=== Schedule ===
Date	Time	Opponent	Site	Result	Attendance	Source
October 7		Sturgis High School*	Kalamazoo, MI	T 12–12		
October 14		at Michigan Agricultural	East Lansing MI	W 10–6		
October 18		Hillsdale		W 21–0		
October 28		at Olivet	Olivet, MI	W 12–11		
November 4		at Alma	Alma, MI	T 5–5		
November 11		Lake Forest*	Kalamazoo, MI	W 26–6		
November 18		at Albion	Albion, MI	W 11–0		
November 25		at Michigan*	Regents Field; Ann Arbor, MI	L 0–24	400	
November 30	2:30 p.m.	Albion	Kalamazoo College campus; Kalamazoo, MI	W 16–11	4,000–5,000	
*Non-conference game
