= 1894 Buchtel football team =

American college football season

1894 Buchtel football
- Conference: Independent
- Record: 1–0
- Head coach: John Heisman (2nd season)
- Captain: Frank Fisher

1894 Midwestern college football independents records
	Conf.			Overall
Team	W	L	T	W		L		T
Western Reserve		–		7	–	0	–	0
North Dakota Agricultural		–		2	–	0	–	0
Baldwin–Wallace		–		1	–	0	–	0
Buchtel		–		1	–	0	–	0
Michigan		–		9	–	1	–	1
Iowa Agricultural		–		5	–	1	–	0
College Of Emporia		–		4	–	1	–	0
Minnesota		–		3	–	1	–	0
Washburn		–		3	–	1	–	0
Wittenberg		–		6	–	2	–	0
Doane		–		5	–	2	–	0
Wisconsin		–		5	–	2	–	0
Notre Dame		–		3	–	1	–	1
Beloit		–		6	–	3	–	0
Washington University		–		2	–	1	–	0
Chicago		–		14	–	7	–	1
Kalamazoo		–		2	–	1	–	1
Ohio State		–		6	–	5	–	0
Case		–		4	–	3	–	0
Illinois		–		4	–	3	–	0
Oberlin		–		4	–	3	–	1
Cincinnati		–		3	–	3	–	0
Drake		–		2	–	2	–	0
Mount Union		–		4	–	5	–	0
Lake Forest		–		3	–	4	–	0
Miami (OH)		–		1	–	2	–	0
Ohio Wesleyan		–		1	–	3	–	0
Rush Medical		–		3	–	6	–	0
Northwestern		–		1	–	5	–	0
Ohio		–		0	–	1	–	0
South Dakota		–		0	–	2	–	0

The 1894 Buchtel football team represented Buchtel College (now Akron University) in the 1894 college football season. The team was led by second-year head coach John Heisman. They outscored their lone opponent Ohio State, 12–6, and finished with a record of 1–0.

== Schedule ==
Date	Opponent	Site	Result
September 5	at Ohio State	Ohio State Fair; Columbus, OH	W 12–6
