= 1894 Minnesota Golden Gophers football team =

American college football season

1894 Minnesota Golden Gophers football
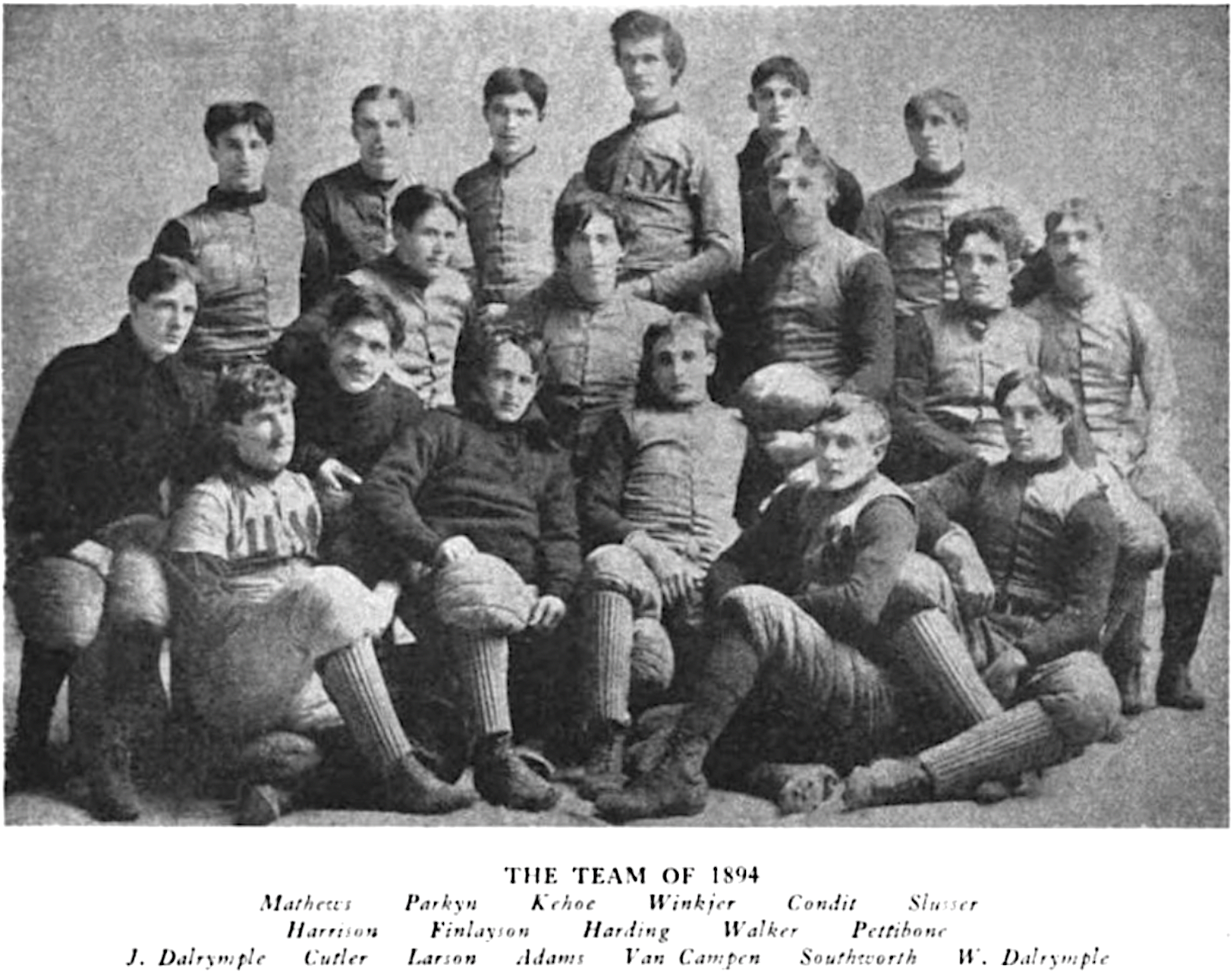
- Conference: Independent
- Record: 3–1
- Head coach: Thomas Cochran (1st season)
- Captain: Everhart P. Harding
- Home stadium: Athletic Park

1894 Midwestern college football independents records
	Conf.			Overall
Team	W	L	T	W		L		T
Western Reserve		–		7	–	0	–	0
North Dakota Agricultural		–		2	–	0	–	0
Baldwin–Wallace		–		1	–	0	–	0
Buchtel		–		1	–	0	–	0
Michigan		–		9	–	1	–	1
Iowa Agricultural		–		5	–	1	–	0
College Of Emporia		–		4	–	1	–	0
Minnesota		–		3	–	1	–	0
Washburn		–		3	–	1	–	0
Wittenberg		–		6	–	2	–	0
Doane		–		5	–	2	–	0
Wisconsin		–		5	–	2	–	0
Notre Dame		–		3	–	1	–	1
Beloit		–		6	–	3	–	0
Washington University		–		2	–	1	–	0
Chicago		–		14	–	7	–	1
Kalamazoo		–		2	–	1	–	1
Ohio State		–		6	–	5	–	0
Case		–		4	–	3	–	0
Illinois		–		4	–	3	–	0
Oberlin		–		4	–	3	–	1
Cincinnati		–		3	–	3	–	0
Drake		–		2	–	2	–	0
Mount Union		–		4	–	5	–	0
Lake Forest		–		3	–	4	–	0
Miami (OH)		–		1	–	2	–	0
Ohio Wesleyan		–		1	–	3	–	0
Rush Medical		–		3	–	6	–	0
Northwestern		–		1	–	5	–	0
Ohio		–		0	–	1	–	0
South Dakota		–		0	–	2	–	0

The 1894 Minnesota Golden Gophers Football Team represented the University of Minnesota as an independent during the 1894 college football season. It was Minnesota's only season under head coach Thomas Cochran, and it featured Minnesota's first trip to Madison, Wisconsin, a game which they were heavily favored to win. However, Wisconsin won a hard-fought game with a score of 6–0. The season also featured Minnesota's first game against Purdue, resulting in a decisive 24–0 victory.

== Schedule ==
Date	Opponent	Site	Result	Attendance	Source
October 13	Grinnell	Minneapolis, MN	W 10–2		
October 27	Purdue	Athletic Park; Minneapolis, MN	W 24–0	2,500	
November 10	Beloit	Minneapolis, MN	W 40–0		
November 17	at Wisconsin	Randall Field; Madison, WI (rivalry)	L 0–6	4,000	

== Roster ==
- Center, A. E. Finlayson
- Guards, Everhart P. Harding (captain and right guard); Augustus T. Larson (left guard)
- Tackles, Willis J. Walker (right tackle); John S. Dalrymple (left tackle)
- Ends, Jack Harrison (left end); William F. Dalrymple (right end)
- Quarterback, Charles H. Van Campen
- Halfbacks, Walter N. Southworth (right half); Charles E. Adams (left half)
- Fullback, Henry C. Cutler & Herbert A. Parkyn
- Substitutes, Edward W. Matthews, William H. Condit, Thomas M. Kehoe, Charles E. Slusser, Joel G. Winkjer, George T. Pettibone
- Coach, Tom Cochrane Jr.
