= W. W. Wharton =

American football coach (1872–1963)

Biographical details
- Born: May 14, 1872; Indiana, U.S.
- Died: December 16, 1963 (aged 91); San Antonio, Texas, U.S.
- Education: Drake University

Coaching career (HC unless noted)
- 1894: Drake

Administrative career (AD unless noted)
- 1894: Drake

Head coaching record
- Overall: 2–2

Winston William Wharton (May 14, 1872 – December 16, 1963) was an American football coach. He was the first head football coach at Drake University in Des Moines, Iowa and he held that position for the 1894 season. His coaching record at Drake was 2–2. He was a man of many talents, including baton twirling. At a church service in Tingley, Iowa a young Dan McGugin was intrigued. Wharton suggested he play football.

== Head coaching record ==
Year	Team	Overall	Conference	Standing	Bowl/playoffs
Drake Bulldogs (Independent) (1894)
1894	Drake	2–2			
Drake:		2–2			
Total:		2–2			
