= 1894 Northwestern Purple football team =

American college football season

1894 Northwestern Purple football
- Conference: Independent
- Record: 4–5
- Head coach: A. A. Ewing (1st season)
- Captain: Jon Oberne

1894 Midwestern college football independents records
| | Conf. | | | Overall |
| Team | W | L | T | W | | L | | T |
|---|---|---|---|---|---|---|---|---|
| Western Reserve | | – | | 7 | – | 0 | – | 0 |
| North Dakota Agricultural | | – | | 2 | – | 0 | – | 0 |
| Baldwin–Wallace | | – | | 1 | – | 0 | – | 0 |
| Buchtel | | – | | 1 | – | 0 | – | 0 |
| Michigan | | – | | 9 | – | 1 | – | 1 |
| Iowa Agricultural | | – | | 5 | – | 1 | – | 0 |
| College Of Emporia | | – | | 4 | – | 1 | – | 0 |
| Minnesota | | – | | 3 | – | 1 | – | 0 |
| Washburn | | – | | 3 | – | 1 | – | 0 |
| Wittenberg | | – | | 6 | – | 2 | – | 0 |
| Doane | | – | | 5 | – | 2 | – | 0 |
| Wisconsin | | – | | 5 | – | 2 | – | 0 |
| Notre Dame | | – | | 3 | – | 1 | – | 1 |
| Beloit | | – | | 6 | – | 3 | – | 0 |
| Washington University | | – | | 2 | – | 1 | – | 0 |
| Chicago | | – | | 14 | – | 7 | – | 1 |
| Kalamazoo | | – | | 2 | – | 1 | – | 1 |
| Ohio State | | – | | 6 | – | 5 | – | 0 |
| Case | | – | | 4 | – | 3 | – | 0 |
| Illinois | | – | | 4 | – | 3 | – | 0 |
| Oberlin | | – | | 4 | – | 3 | – | 1 |
| Cincinnati | | – | | 3 | – | 3 | – | 0 |
| Drake | | – | | 2 | – | 2 | – | 0 |
| Mount Union | | – | | 4 | – | 5 | – | 0 |
| Lake Forest | | – | | 3 | – | 4 | – | 0 |
| Miami (OH) | | – | | 1 | – | 2 | – | 0 |
| Ohio Wesleyan | | – | | 1 | – | 3 | – | 0 |
| Rush Medical | | – | | 3 | – | 6 | – | 0 |
| Northwestern | | – | | 1 | – | 5 | – | 0 |
| Ohio | | – | | 0 | – | 1 | – | 0 |
| South Dakota | | – | | 0 | – | 2 | – | 0 |

The 1894 Northwestern Purple team represented Northwestern University during the 1894 college football season. In their first and only year under head coach A. A. Ewing, the Purple compiled a 4–5 record. Three of the victories were mid-week warm-up games against Evanston High School. In three games against major college opponents (Chicago and Illinois), the team lost by a combined total score of 148 to 0.

== Schedule ==
| Date | Opponent | Site | Result | Source |
|---|---|---|---|---|
| October 6 | at Chicago | Marshall Field; Chicago, IL | L 0–46 | |
| October 11 | Evanston High School | Evanston, IL | W 14–0 | |
| October 13 | at Lake Forest | Lake Forest, IL | L 6–24 | |
| October 17 | Evanston High School | Evanston, IL | W 12–0 | |
| October 20 | Beloit | Evanston, IL | L 6–42 | |
| October 24 | Evanston High School | Evanston, IL | W 22–6 | |
| October 26 | Lake Forest | Evanston, IL | W 12–8 | |
| November 3 | at Illinois | Illinois Field; Champaign, IL (rivalry) | L 0–66 | |
| November 24 | Chicago | Evanston, IL | L 0–36 | |
