= 1894 Illinois Fighting Illini football team =

American college football season

1894 Illinois Fighting Illini football
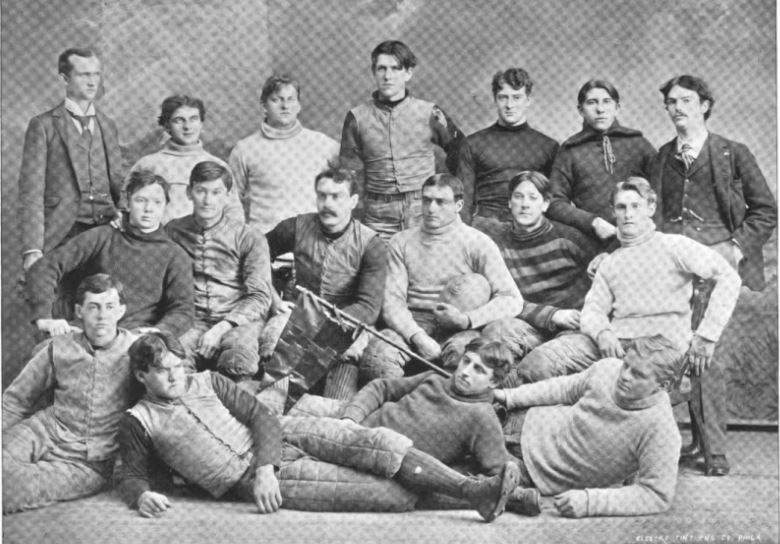
- Conference: Independent
- Record: 4–3
- Head coach: Louis Vail (1st season)
- Captain: James E. Pfeffer
- Home stadium: Illinois Field

1894 Midwestern college football independents records
	Conf.			Overall
Team	W	L	T	W		L		T
Western Reserve		–		7	–	0	–	0
North Dakota Agricultural		–		2	–	0	–	0
Baldwin–Wallace		–		1	–	0	–	0
Buchtel		–		1	–	0	–	0
Michigan		–		9	–	1	–	1
Iowa Agricultural		–		5	–	1	–	0
College Of Emporia		–		4	–	1	–	0
Minnesota		–		3	–	1	–	0
Washburn		–		3	–	1	–	0
Wittenberg		–		6	–	2	–	0
Doane		–		5	–	2	–	0
Wisconsin		–		5	–	2	–	0
Notre Dame		–		3	–	1	–	1
Beloit		–		6	–	3	–	0
Washington University		–		2	–	1	–	0
Chicago		–		14	–	7	–	1
Kalamazoo		–		2	–	1	–	1
Ohio State		–		6	–	5	–	0
Case		–		4	–	3	–	0
Illinois		–		4	–	3	–	0
Oberlin		–		4	–	3	–	1
Cincinnati		–		3	–	3	–	0
Drake		–		2	–	2	–	0
Mount Union		–		4	–	5	–	0
Lake Forest		–		3	–	4	–	0
Miami (OH)		–		1	–	2	–	0
Ohio Wesleyan		–		1	–	3	–	0
Rush Medical		–		3	–	6	–	0
Northwestern		–		1	–	5	–	0
Ohio		–		0	–	1	–	0
South Dakota		–		0	–	2	–	0

The 1894 Illinois Fighting Illini football team was an American football team that represented the University of Illinois during the 1894 college football season. In their first season under head coach Louis Vail, the Illini compiled a 4–3 record. Tackle James E. Pfeffer was the team captain.

== Schedule ==
Date	Time	Opponent	Site	Result	Source
October 6		at Wabash	Ingels Field; Crawfordsville, IN	W 36–6	
October 13	3:30 p.m.	at Chicago Athletic Association	South Side Park; Chicago, IL	L 0–14	
October 20		Lake Forest	Illinois Field; Champaign, IL	W 54–6	
November 3		Northwestern	Illinois Field; Champaign, IL (rivalry)	W 66–0	
November 17		Purdue	Illinois Field; Champaign, IL (rivalry)	L 2–22	
November 24		Indianapolis Light Artillery	Illinois Field; Champaign, IL	L 14–18	
November 29		at Pastime Athletic Club	Sportsman's Park; St. Louis, MO	W 10–0	

== Roster ==
Baum, Harry W. QB; Beebe, Charles D. RG; Branch, James M. LE/T; Chester, Guy J. LHB; Cooper, Paul H. RE; Fouts, L.H. LG; Gaut, Robert E. C; Hotchkiss, R.J. RHB; Kiler, William H. FB; Lantz, Simon E. LG; Pfeffer, James E. RT (captain); Pixley, Arthur H. LT; Quade, John C. LE; Schacht, Frederick W. RE; Sconce, Harvey J. LHB; Sweney, Don LG; Tilton, Harry W. QB; Woody, Frederick W. QB	Substitutes: none

Source: University of Illinois
