= James L. Morrison =

American football player and coach

James L. D. Morrison
Biographical details
- Born: Morrisonville, Illinois, U.S.

Playing career
- 1893: Michigan
- Position: Tackle

Coaching career (HC unless noted)
- 1894: Notre Dame
- 1894: Hillsdale
- 1895: Knox (IL)
- 1896: Illinois College

Head coaching record
- Overall: 12–9–2

James L. D. Morrison was an American football player and coach.

He officially holds the title of Notre Dame's first football coach thanks to a two-week contract he served as head coach in 1894.

Notre Dame hired Morrison, a recent veteran of the University of Michigan's squad, in October 1894, with a contract to coach for two weeks for the salary of $40 plus expenses.

Morrison had been recommended for the job by the Michigan football trainer, Charlie Baird. Morrison wrote to Baird after his first day on the job: "I arrived here [Notre Dame] this morning and found about as green a set of football players that ever donned a uniform…They want to smoke, and when I told them that they would have to run and get up some wind, they thought I was rubbing it in on them. "One big, strong cuss remarked that it was too much like work. Well, maybe you think I didn't give him hell! I bet you a hundred no one ever makes a remark like that again."

Morrison stressed conditioning, speed, and an abundance of end runs and convinced his players that conditioning and speed would lead them to victory. Such tactics led to an opening 14–0 win over Hillsdale. Next came Albion, fresh from a 26–12 loss to Michigan, who proved to be tough. The game ended in a 6–6 tie when substitute fullback John Studebaker fell on a fumble for the only Fighting Irish touchdown.

At the conclusion of the two-week contract Morrison left to take the head coaching job at Hillsdale College. His Irish charges finished the year 3–1–1, losing only to Albion in the season finale (this meant the Irish had a record of 2-0-1 without Morrison). At Hillsdale, Morrison spent just one week. His Hillsdale team was shut out 12–0 on the road at Albion.

In 1896 Notre Dame hired its first full-time coach, 22-year-old Frank E. Hering, who coached the team for three years while also playing quarterback and serving part of that time as director of athletics.

In the spring of 1895, Morrison received his law degree from the University of Michigan. In 1896 he was the head football coach at Illinois College in Jacksonville, Illinois.

== Head coaching record ==
Year	Team	Overall	Bowl/playoffs
Notre Dame (Independent) (1894)
1894	Notre Dame	3–1–1	
Notre Dame:		3–1–1	
Hillsdale Dales (Independent) (1894)
1894	Hillsdale	3–3	
Hillsdale:		3–3	
Knox Old Siwash (Independent) (1894)
1895	Knox	6–1–1	
Knox:		6–1–1	
Illinois College Blueboys (Independent) (1896)
1896	Illinois College	0–5	
Illinois College:		0–5	
Total:		12–9–2	
