= Charles Hall (American football) =

American college football player and coach journalist, and manufacturer (1875–1945)

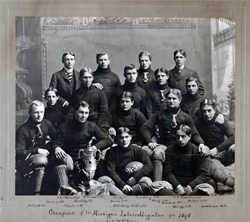
- 1898 Kalamazoo football team, MIAA champions; Hall is standing on the back row on the far right

Biographical details
- Born: December 23, 1875; Burlington, New Jersey, U.S.
- Died: December 26, 1945 (aged 70); Kalamazoo, Michigan, U.S.

Playing career
- 1896: Kalamazoo
- Position: Fullback

Coaching career (HC unless noted)
- 1897–1900: Kalamazoo

Head coaching record
- Overall: 21–4–3

Accomplishments and honors

Championships
- 3 MIAA (1897–1899)

Charles Cloud Hall (December 23, 1875 – December 26, 1945) was an American college football player and coach, journalist, and manufacturer. He served the head football coach at Kalamazoo College in Kalamazoo, Michigan four seasons, from 1897 to 1900, and compiling a record of 21–4–3. Hall was also captain of the 1896 Kalamazoo football team on which he played as a fullback.

Hall was born on December 23, 1875, in Burlington, New Jersey, to Thomas A. and Jennie Reed Hall. He moved with his parents, in 1882, to Kalamazoo, where he attended school. He captained the first football team fielded at Kalamazoo High School, in 1893, and remained football captain through the 1895 season, before graduating in 1896. Hall left his studies at Kalamazoo College due to his father's illness, but remained coach of the football team, which he led to three consecutive Michigan Intercollegiate Athletic Association (MIAA) titles, from 1897 to 1899.

Hall served as a corporal in the Spanish–American War. After returning from the war, he worked as a reporter for the Kalamazoo Gazette. He was the founder Durametallic Corporation, which was incorporated in 1917 as the New Era Manufacturing Company. Hall was the vice president of the company, which produced flexible metallic packaging, gabbitt metal, and found flux. He focused on sales and promotions. Hall died on December 26, 1945, at his home in Kalamazoo.

== Head coaching record ==
Year	Team	Overall	Conference	Standing	Bowl/playoffs
Kalamazoo (Michigan Intercollegiate Athletic Association) (1897–1900)
1897	Kalamazoo	6–1	6–0	1st	
1898	Kalamazoo	7–0	5–0	1st	
1899	Kalamazoo	6–1–2	5–0	1st	
1900	Kalamazoo	2–2–1	1–1	2nd	
Kalamazoo:		21–4–3	17–1		
Total:		21–4–3			
National championship Conference title Conference division title or championship game berth
