= 1894 Cincinnati football team =

American college football season

1894 Cincinnati football
- Conference: Independent
- Record: 3–3
- Head coach: W. Durant Berry (1st season)
- Captain: W. Durant Berry
- Home stadium: League Park

1894 Midwestern college football independents records
	Conf.			Overall
Team	W	L	T	W		L		T
Western Reserve		–		7	–	0	–	0
North Dakota Agricultural		–		2	–	0	–	0
Baldwin–Wallace		–		1	–	0	–	0
Buchtel		–		1	–	0	–	0
Michigan		–		9	–	1	–	1
Iowa Agricultural		–		5	–	1	–	0
College Of Emporia		–		4	–	1	–	0
Minnesota		–		3	–	1	–	0
Washburn		–		3	–	1	–	0
Wittenberg		–		6	–	2	–	0
Doane		–		5	–	2	–	0
Wisconsin		–		5	–	2	–	0
Notre Dame		–		3	–	1	–	1
Beloit		–		6	–	3	–	0
Washington University		–		2	–	1	–	0
Chicago		–		14	–	7	–	1
Kalamazoo		–		2	–	1	–	1
Ohio State		–		6	–	5	–	0
Case		–		4	–	3	–	0
Illinois		–		4	–	3	–	0
Oberlin		–		4	–	3	–	1
Cincinnati		–		3	–	3	–	0
Drake		–		2	–	2	–	0
Mount Union		–		4	–	5	–	0
Lake Forest		–		3	–	4	–	0
Miami (OH)		–		1	–	2	–	0
Ohio Wesleyan		–		1	–	3	–	0
Rush Medical		–		3	–	6	–	0
Northwestern		–		1	–	5	–	0
Ohio		–		0	–	1	–	0
South Dakota		–		0	–	2	–	0

The 1894 Cincinnati football team was an American football team that represented the University of Cincinnati as an independent during the 1894 college football season. Led by first-year head coach W. Durant Berry, Cincinnati compiled a record of 3–3. Berry was also the team captain. The team played home games at League Park in Cincinnati.

== Schedule ==
Date	Time	Opponent	Site	Result	Attendance	Source
October 13		at Georgetown (KY)	Georgetown, KY	L 4–6		
October 20		Miami (OH)	Cincinnati, OH (rivalry)	W 6–0		
November 3		Kentucky University	Cincinnati, OH	W 32–4	500	
November 9		at Hanover	Madison, IN	W 14–12		
November 17		Ohio State	League Park; Cincinnati, OH	L 4–6		
November 29	2:45 p.m.	Ohio Wesleyan	League Park; Cincinnati, OH	L 4–16	6,000	
