= Alva C. Smith =

American football player and coach (1871–1941)

Biographical details
- Born: November 1, 1871; Cleveland, Ohio, U.S.
- Died: October 4, 1941 (aged 69); Narragansett, Rhode Island, U.S.

Playing career

Football
- 1891–1894: Case
- Position: Quarterback

Coaching career (HC unless noted)
- 1896–1898: Case

Head coaching record
- Overall: 10–10

Alva Cornwall "Ollie" Smith (November 1, 1871 – October 4, 1941) was an American college football player and coach. Born in Cleveland, Smith attended high school at Cleveland's Central High School.

Smith played football at Case School of Applied Science—now known as Case Western Reserve University as a quarterback from 1891 to 1894. Smith captained the Case football team the two seasons, including the undefeated 1893 Case football team. He majored in chemistry and was a member of Zeta Psi fraternity.

Smith coached at Case for three seasons, from 1896 to 1898, compiling a record of 10–10. He has a 2–1 record against Ohio State and a 2–1 mark against rival Western Reserve.

He drowned at Narragansett, Rhode Island on October 4, 1941.

== Head coaching record ==
Year	Team	Overall	Conference	Standing	Bowl/playoffs
Case (Independent) (1896–1898)
1896	Case	2–4			
1897	Case	5–1			
1898	Case	3–5			
Case:		10–10			
Total:		10–10			
