= Henninger =

Henninger is a family name that originated in Germany. The name is attested as 'Honigar' from the 13th century in Bavaria, and was borne by members of the nobility of the Holy Roman Empire and by the family that founded the Henninger Brewery. It is most prevalent today in Baden-Württemberg.

== History ==
There are more than one, seemingly unrelated, Henninger branches from Germany. Seemingly there were branches formed from a variety of spellings in the regions of Hessia, Baden, and Saxony/Bavaria/Bohemia. The earliest origins of the Bavarian/Bohemian name date back to the Dark Ages and started with a different name altogether. In 978, the Saxon nobleman Bruno, Graf von Arneburg, died. His grandson, Wilhelm, Graf von Lütisburg seemingly took on the additional estate of 'von Seeberg' in 1089 due to marriage. Seeberg lies along the modern border of the Czech Republic and Bavaria in the Eger (now called Cheb) and Planá region. At the time, it was in the Kingdom of Bohemia. In 1200, Conrad von Seeberg, grandson of Wilhelm, founded a branch of the family, led by his son Thimo von Seeberg, near Vohburg, Bavaria. At that time, a relative of his, perhaps a grandson, took over control of the Schloss Seeberg. His name was Honigar von Seeberg. His descendants held Seeberg until at least 1394. This is the first appearance of the name in historical records. In 1404, there appears to be a family break and another family, Schmiedel von Seeberg, began.

The name evolved to Henninger von Seeberg over the centuries. They were ennobled by the Holy Roman Emperor for fighting the Hussites in 1423. They were later raised to the title of Freiherr or Baron von Seeberg in 1571. Branches of the family spread throughout the Bohemian and Hungarian kingdoms over time and Henningers von Seeberg or the derivative 'von Eberg' were listed as knights and nobles throughout those kingdoms. Johann Wenzel Henninger von Eberg was raised to the state of Freiherr in 1744. There is a branch that was ennobled in 1816 in Hungary known as "zu Eberka" and another branch of the family was ennobled in 1853 for military service by the Austro-Hungarian Emperor. Lieutenant General Emmanuel Henninger, Freiherr von Eberg, was one of the regimental commanders at the Austrian victory at Custoza, Italy in 1866. His father Johann, also an Austro-Hungarian Major General of Army, had been granted the title of Freiherr von Eberg just prior to his death.

In Bavaria, a branch of Honigar von Seeberg's family had migrated north from Vohburg to Rothenburg ob der Tauber in the early 15th century. That family continued in the area and in 1816 purchased the Reuter brewery in Erlangen, Bavaria. It was from Erlangen that the larger Henninger brewery family started, branching out into Frankfurt in 1869.

The first mention of the Hessian-based Henningers comes from 1423, and those from the Baden area start to occur soon after. To date the region that has the most Henningers today is Baden-Württemberg.

=== Name variations and associated families ===
- Henninger (Frankish spelling) von Seeberg
- Henniger (Rhine spelling) von Eberg
- Hönniger
- Hennigar
- Hunninger
- Hanygar
- Henigar ze Žeberka
- von Gumpenburg
- Schmiedel von Seeberg
- Hoenniger
- Henegar (Americanized spelling, common in Tennessee)
- Heninger
- Hanninger
- Haninger
- Heininger

== People ==
Notable people with the name include the following.

=== Surname ===
- Annette Henninger (born 1966), German political scientist
- Bianca Henninger (born 1990), American-born Mexican footballer
- Brian Henninger (born 1962), American golfer
- Daniel Henninger, American journalist
- Egon Henninger (1940–2025), German swimmer
- F. A. Henninger (1865–1944), American architect
- Frederick W. Henninger (1873–1919), American businessman and football player and coach
- Hans Henninger (1905–1937), German stage and film actor
- Joseph Morgan Henninger (1906–1999), American artist and illustrator
- Mark Henninger (born 1973), American college athletics administrator and former football coach
- Mark G. Henninger (born 1948), American philosopher and Jesuit priest
- Rick Henninger (born 1948), American baseball player

=== Middle name ===
- John Henninger Reagan (1818–1905), United States Congressman and United States Senator from Texas; Postmaster General of the Confederate States of America

== Places ==
- Henninger Brewery, located in Frankfurt, Germany
- Henninger Flats, a small hanging basin in the Angeles National Forest, California, U.S.
- Henninger High School, located in Syracuse, New York, U.S.
- Henninger Turm, a grain storage silo located in Frankfurt, Germany

== See also ==
- Heninger
