= List of Michigan Wolverines head football coaches =

The Michigan Wolverines football program is a college football team that represents the University of Michigan in the NCAA's Big Ten Conference. The Wolverines have played 1,419 games during their 146 seasons, winning a collegiate-record 1,021 contests (1021–362–36) for a winning percentage of .732.

Michigan has had 22 head coaches since its first recorded football game in 1879. Mike Murphy and Frank Crawford, co-head coaches for a single season in 1891, were the team's first head coaches. During his first season at Michigan in 1901, Fielding H. Yost guided the Wolverines to the 1902 Rose Bowl, the first college bowl game ever played. Since then, ten other coaches have led the Wolverines to postseason bowl games: Fritz Crisler, Bennie Oosterbaan, Bump Elliott, Bo Schembechler, Gary Moeller, Lloyd Carr, Rich Rodriguez, Brady Hoke, Jim Harbaugh and Sherrone Moore. Ten coaches have won at least one of Michigan's 45 Big Ten Conference championships: Gustave Ferbert, Yost, Harry Kipke, Crisler, Oosterbaan, Elliott, Schembechler, Moeller, Carr, and Harbaugh. Four coaches—Kipke, Oosterbaan, Elliott and Harbaugh—have won Big Ten titles as both a player and as the head coach for Michigan. Yost, Kipke, Crisler, Oosterbaan, Carr and Harbaugh have won national championships with the Wolverines.

Schembechler is the program's all-time leader in wins (194) and games coached (247). Yost coached for the most seasons (25) and has the highest winning percentage (.833) of any coach who led the program for more than three seasons. Michigan had nine head coaches between 1900 and 1989, each of whom has been inducted into the College Football Hall of Fame either as a coach or as a player: Langdon Lea, Yost, George Little, Tad Wieman, Kipke, Crisler, Oosterbaan, Elliott, and Schembechler. The Wolverines' current head coach is Kyle Whittingham.

== Coaches ==
Key to symbols in coaches list
General		Overall		Conference		Postseason (Note: Although the first Rose Bowl Game was played in 1902, it has been continuously played since the 1916 game, and is recognized as the oldest bowl game by the NCAA. "—" indicates any season prior to 1916 when postseason games were not played.)	
No.	Order of coaches (Note: A running total of the number of head coaches, with coaches who served separate tenures being counted only once. Interim head coaches are represented with "Int" and are not counted in the running total. "—" indicates the team played but either without a coach or no coach is on record. "X" indicates an interim year without play.)	GC	Games coached	CW	Conference wins	PW	Postseason wins
DC	Division championships	OW	Overall wins	CL	Conference losses	PL	Postseason losses
CC	Conference championships	OL	Overall losses	CT	Conference ties	PT	Postseason ties
NC	National championships	OT	Overall ties (Note: Overtime rules in college football were introduced in 1996, making ties impossible in the period since.)	C%	Conference winning percentage		
†	Elected to the College Football Hall of Fame	O%	Overall winning percentage (Note: When computing the win–loss percentage, a tie counts as half a win and half a loss.)				

=== List ===
No.	Name	Term	GC	OW	OL	OT	O%	CW	CL	CT	C%	PW	PL	CC	NC
—	No coaches	1879–1890	34	23	10	1	.691	0	0	0	–	0	0	0	0
1	Frank Crawford & Mike Murphy	1891	9	4	5	0	.444	0	0	0	–	0	0	0	0
3	Frank Barbour	1892–1893	22	14	8	0	.636	0	0	0	–	0	0	0	0
4	William McCauley	1894–1895	20	17	2	1	.875	0	0	0	–	0	0	0	0
5	William Ward	1896	10	9	1	0	.900	2	1	0	.667	0	0	0	0
6	Gustave Ferbert	1897–1899	28	24	3	1	.875	6	2	0	.750	0	0	1	0
7	Langdon Lea^{†}	1900	10	7	2	1	.750	3	2	0	.600	0	0	0	0
8	Fielding H. Yost^{†}	1901–1923, 1925–1926	204	165	29	10	.833	42	10	2	.796	1	0	10	6
9	George Little^{†}	1924	8	6	2	0	.750	4	2	0	.667	0	0	0	0
10	Tad Wieman^{†}	1927–1928	16	9	6	1	.594	5	5	0	.500	0	0	0	0
11	Harry Kipke^{†}	1929–1937	76	46	26	4	.632	27	21	2	.560	0	0	4	2
12	Fritz Crisler^{†}	1938–1947	90	71	16	3	.806	42	12	3	.777	1	0	2	1
13	Bennie Oosterbaan^{†}	1948–1958	100	63	33	4	.650	44	23	4	.648	1	0	3	1
14	Bump Elliott^{†}	1959–1968	95	51	42	2	.547	32	34	3	.485	1	0	1	0
15	Bo Schembechler^{†}	1969–1989	247	194	48	5	.796	143	23	3	.855	5	12	13	0
16	Gary Moeller	1990–1994	60	44	13	3	.758	30	8	2	.775	4	1	3	0
17	Lloyd Carr^{†}	1995–2007	162	122	40	0	.753	81	23	0	.779	6	7	5	1
18	Rich Rodriguez	2008–2010	37	15	22	0	.405	6	18	0	.250	0	1	0	0
19	Brady Hoke	2011–2014	51	31	20	0	.608	18	14	0	.563	1	2	0	0
20	Jim Harbaugh	2015–2023	111 (Note: Harbaugh was suspended for the first three games of the 2023 season. Jesse Minter served as interim head coach for the first game of the season, Jay Harbaugh and Mike Hart were interim co-head coaches for the second game, and Sherrone Moore served as interim head coach for the third game. Harbaugh was suspended a second time, for the final three games of the regular season. Moore served as acting head coach for those games, but the games were credited to Harbaugh's record.)	86	25	0	.775	60	17	0	.779	3	6	3	1
—	Jesse Minter	2023 (interim)	1	1	0	0	1.000	0	0	0	–	0	0	0	0
—	Jay Harbaugh & Mike Hart	2023 (interim)	1	1	0	0	1.000	0	0	0	–	0	0	0	0
21	Sherrone Moore	2023 (acting), 2024–2025	24 (Note: Moore was suspended for the third and fourth games of the 2025 season against Central Michigan and Nebraska, and fired before the 2025 Citrus Bowl; during which Biff Poggi served as interim head coach.)	16	8	0	.667	11	6	0	.647	1	0	0	0
—	Biff Poggi	2025 (interim)	3	2	1	0	.667	1	0	0	1.000	0	1	0	0
22	Kyle Whittingham	2026–present	9	5	4	0	.556	2	4	0	.333	0	0	0	0

Updated though November 7, 2026

== Statistical leaders ==
Full-time coaches only

Most overall wins
1. Bo Schembechler (194)
2. Fielding H. Yost (165)
3. Lloyd Carr (122)
4. Jim Harbaugh (86)
5. Fritz Crisler (71)

Most Big Ten wins
1. Bo Schembechler (143)
2. Lloyd Carr (81)
3. Jim Harbaugh (60)
4. Bennie Oosterbaan (44)
5. Fielding H. Yost (42)
5. Fritz Crisler (42)

Highest overall winning percentage
1. William Ward (.900)
2. William McCauley (.875)
3. Gustave Ferbert (.875)
4. Fielding H. Yost (.833)
5. Bo Schembechler (.796)

Highest Big Ten winning percentage
1. Bo Schembechler (.855)
2. Fielding H. Yost (.796)
3. Jim Harbaugh (.779)
4. Lloyd Carr (.779)
5. Fritz Crisler (.777)

Lowest overall winning percentage
1. Rich Rodriguez (.405)
2. Frank Crawford/Mike Murphy (.444)
3. Bump Elliott (.547)
4. Tad Wieman (.594)
5. Brady Hoke (.608)

Lowest Big Ten winning percentage
1. Rich Rodriguez (.250)
2. Bump Elliott (.485)
3. Tad Wieman (.500)
4. Harry Kipke (.560)
5. Brady Hoke (.563)

Big Ten championships
1. Bo Schembechler (13)
2. Fielding H. Yost (10)
3. Lloyd Carr (5)
4. Harry Kipke (4)
5. Gary Moeller (3)
5. Bennie Oosterbaan (3)
5. Jim Harbaugh (3)

National championships
1. Fielding H. Yost (6)
2. Harry Kipke (2)
3. Fritz Crisler (1)
3. Bennie Oosterbaan (1)
3. Lloyd Carr (1)
3. Jim Harbaugh (1)

== Profiles ==
=== Murphy and Crawford (1891) ===
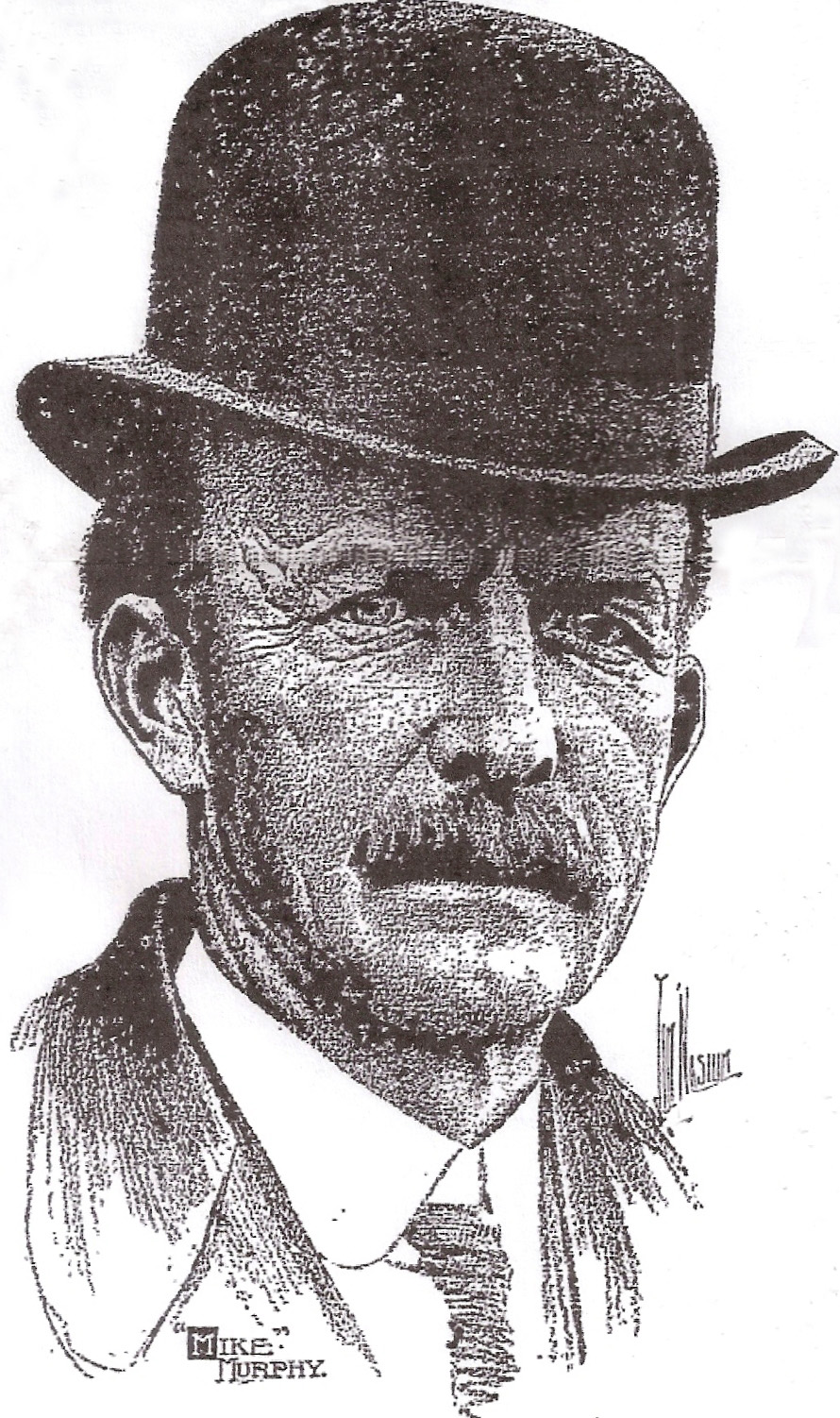
Michigan's first head coach, Mike Murphy, was considered the premier athletic trainer of his era.

Although Michigan began fielding a football team in 1879, the first season in which the team had a coaching staff was 1891. While official sources list only Mike Murphy and Frank Crawford as the coaches of the 1891 team, the Chicago Daily Tribune reported in November 1891 that the Michigan team was "coached systematically" by Murphy, Crawford, Horace Greely Prettyman and James Duffy. After leaving Michigan, Murphy was the athletic trainer at the University of Pennsylvania for many years and coached the American track athletes at the Summer Olympics in 1900, 1908, and 1912. The Washington Post in 1913 called Murphy "the father of American track athletics." He was considered the premier athletic trainer of his era and was said to have "revolutionized the methods of training athletes and reduced it to a science." Crawford went on to coach at the University of Wisconsin–Madison, the University of Nebraska–Lincoln, the University of Texas at Austin, and Nebraska Wesleyan University.

=== Frank Barbour (1892–1893) ===
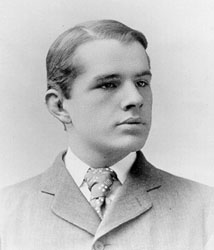
Frank Barbour coached the Wolverines from 1892 to 1893.

In 1892, Yale graduate Frank Barbour took over as head coach and led the Wolverines to a 14–8 record in two seasons as head coach.

=== William McCauley (1894–1895) ===
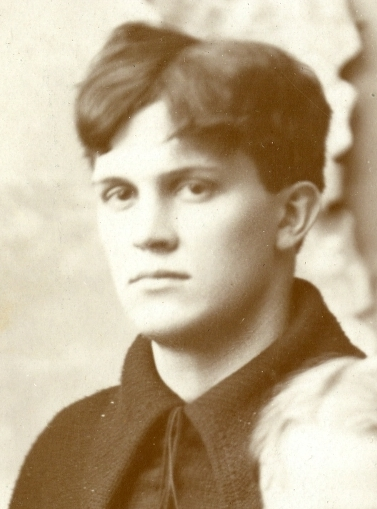
William McCauley led Michigan to its first Western championship in 1895.

Medical student William McCauley took over in 1894 and led the team to a 17–2–1 record from 1894 to 1895. The 1895 team compiled an 8–1 record, won seven of their games by shutouts, and outscored their opponents by a combined score of 266 to 14. The sole loss in McCauley's final year was a 4–0 loss to Harvard, then one of the three great football powers. Undefeated against Western opponents, the 1895 Wolverines laid claim to Michigan's first Western football championship.

=== William Ward (1896) ===
William Ward was the head coach for the 1896 team. Ward's team won the first nine consecutive games by a combined score of 256 to 4. In the final game of the season, the team lost a close game to Amos Alonzo Stagg's University of Chicago team by a score of 7–6. In his one season as head coach, Ward compiled a 9–1 record, which stands as the best winning percentage (.900) among all 19 Michigan football head coaches.

=== Gustave Ferbert (1897–1899) ===
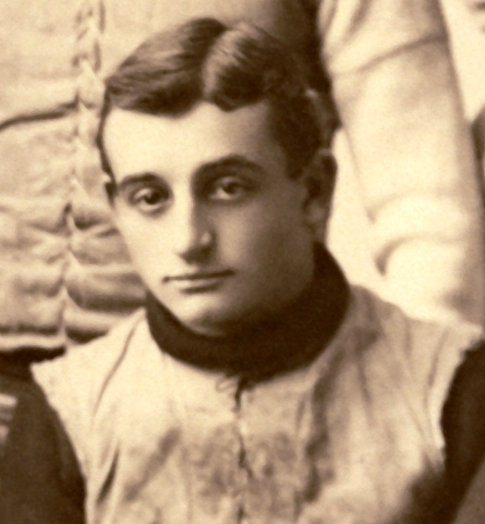
Gustave Ferbert resigned in 1900 to prospect for gold in Alaska and became rich off his gold claims.

In 1897, Michigan's former star halfback Gustave Ferbert took over as head coach. The 1898 team coached by Ferbert finished with a perfect 10–0 record and won Michigan's first Western Conference championship. In May 1900, amid the Klondike Gold Rush, Ferbert resigned as Michigan's head coach and left for Alaska to search for gold. After several years in the Klondike, Ferbert emerged in 1909 having become wealthy from his gold finds.

=== Langdon "Biffy" Lea (1900) ===
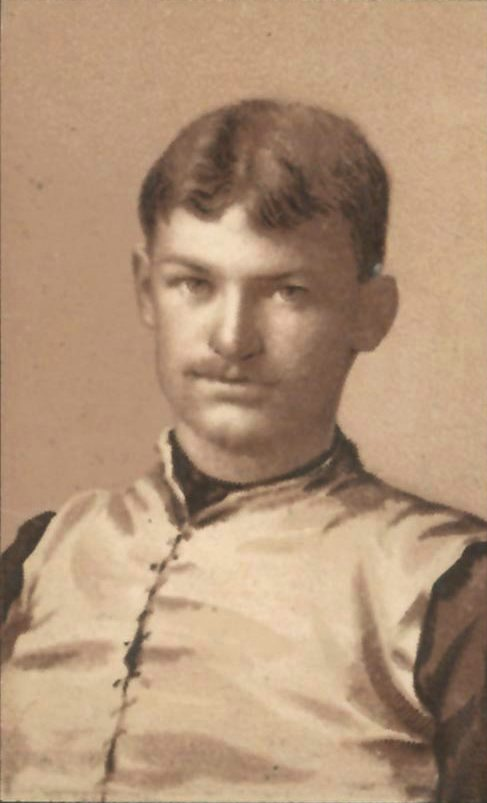
Princeton All-American Langdon Lea was head coach in 1900.

With the departure of Ferbert, Michigan hired three-time Princeton All-American "Biffy" Lea to coach the 1900 team. Lea led the 1900 team to a 7–2–1 and a fifth-place finish in the Western Conference.

==== 90 years of Hall of Fame inductees ====
Beginning with Lea, all nine individuals who served as head coach at Michigan during the 90 years from 1900 to 1989 have been inducted into the College Football Hall of Fame either as a player or coach. They are Lea, Fielding "Hurry Up" Yost, George Little, Tad Wieman, Harry Kipke, Fritz Crisler, Bennie Oosterbaan, Bump Elliott, and Bo Schembechler.

=== Fielding H. Yost (1901–1923, 1925–1926) ===
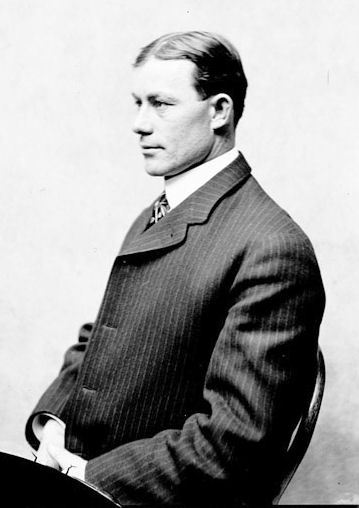
Fielding H. Yost's "Point-a-Minute" teams compiled a record of 55–1–1 and outscored opponents 2,821 to 42 in his first five seasons (1901–1905).

Fielding H. Yost has the longest tenure among Michigan head coaches, holding the position for 25 seasons from 1901–1923 and 1925–1926. His famed "Point-a-Minute" teams from 1901 to 1905 outscored opponents 2,821 to 42. The 1901 team was undefeated and unscored upon, having won all eleven games by a combined score of 550 to 0, including a 49–0 victory over Stanford in the first bowl game, the 1902 Rose Bowl.

=== George Little (1924) ===
When Yost retired after the 1923 football season, his assistant George Little took over as the new head coach. Little served only one year in the position, leading the 1924 team to a 6–2 record. Little later served as the football coach and athletic director at the University of Wisconsin–Madison, athletic director at Rutgers University, and executive secretary of the National Football Foundation and College Football Hall of Fame.

=== Tad Wieman (1927–1928) ===
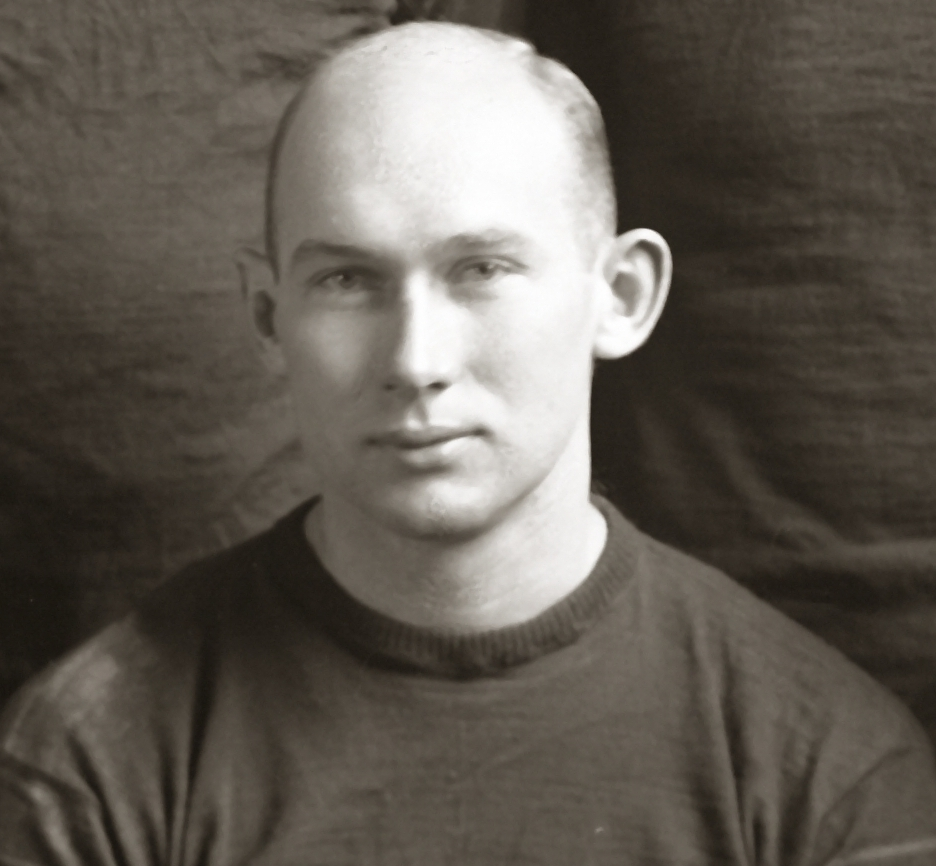
When Tad Wieman announced his decision to attend Michigan, the Los Angeles Times called it "a calamity of almost national importance."

In 1925, Yost returned to the position of head coach through the end of the 1926 season. In 1927, assistant coach Tad Wieman took over as head coach and led the Wolverines to a 9–6 record in two years as head coach.

=== Harry Kipke (1929–1937) ===
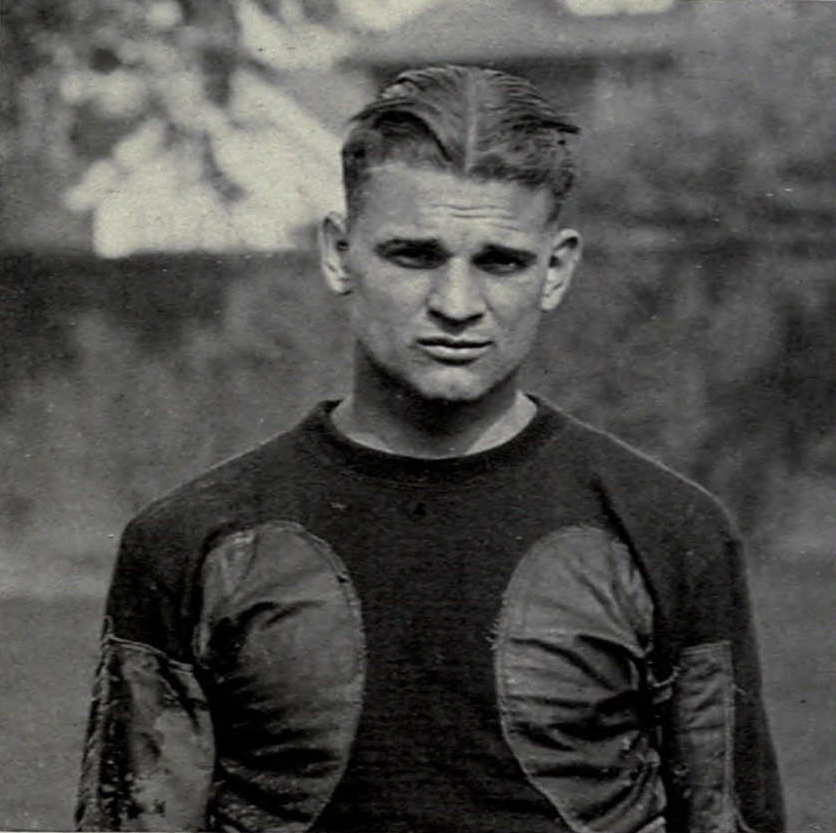
All-American Harry Kipke won two national championships as Michigan's head coach in the 1930s.

In 1929, Michigan's former All-American halfback Harry Kipke was hired to replace Wieman. In his first year as head coach, the Wolverines finished in an eighth place tie in the Big Ten with a 5–3–1 record. However, Kipke quickly turned things around, leading the Wolverines to four straight conference championships and two national titles between 1930 and 1933. The 1932 and 1933 national championships teams did not lose any games. Kipke called his system "a punt, a pass, and a prayer" and reportedly coined the phrase, "A great defense is a great offense." In 1934, Kipke’s Wolverines fell from national champions to a tenth-place finish in the conference with a 1–7 record. Between 1934 and 1937, Kipke's team accumulated a 10–22 record.

=== Fritz Crisler (1938–1947) ===
Fritz Crisler took over as head coach at Michigan in 1938 and remained in that position through the 1947 season. Crisler is best known as "the father of two-platoon football," an innovation in which separate units of players were used for offense and defense. Crisler developed two-platoon football while serving as Michigan's head coach. Crisler also introduced the distinctive winged football helmet to the Michigan Wolverines in 1938. Crisler's 1947 Michigan Wolverines football team, dubbed the "Mad Magicians," has been selected as the best team in the history of Michigan football.

=== Bennie Oosterbaan (1948–1958) ===
Crisler retired as head coach after the 1947 season to become the school's full-time athletic director. He appointed his former assistant, Bennie Oosterbaan as the new head football coach. In the mid-1920s, Oosterbaan was a three-time first team All-American football end, a two-time All-American basketball player, and an All-Big Ten Conference baseball player. As recently as 2003, Oosterbaan was selected by Sports Illustrated as the fourth greatest athlete in the history of the State of Michigan. In his first year as the head coach of the football team, the 1948 Michigan Wolverines football team won an Associated Press national championship. His 1950 team won the 1951 Rose Bowl. Oosterbaan also coached the baseball and basketball teams at Michigan.

=== Bump Elliott (1959–1968) ===
In 1959, Bump Elliott took over as head coach. Elliott had played halfback for Fritz Crisler's Michigan teams in 1946 and 1947 and won the Chicago Tribune Silver Football trophy as the Most Valuable Player in the conference in 1947. He was Michigan's head coach for ten years from 1959 to 1968. His 1964 team won a Big Ten Conference championship and the 1965 Rose Bowl. He later served as the athletic director at the University of Iowa from 1970 to 1991, hiring such coaches as Dan Gable, Hayden Fry, Lute Olson, C. Vivian Stringer, and Dr. Tom Davis.

=== Bo Schembechler (1969–1989) ===
Bo Schembechler served as Michigan's head coach for 21 years from 1969 to 1989. He is the winningest head coach in Michigan history with 194 wins. His teams won 13 Big Ten Conference championships.

=== Gary Moeller (1990–1994) ===
Gary Moeller was named Michigan's head coach after Schembechler's retirement. During his five seasons as head coach (1990–1994), the Wolverines had a record of 44–13–3 and won or shared conference titles in 1990, 1991 and 1992. Moeller resigned in May 1995 after tapes were released of his alleged drunken outburst following an arrest on a charge of disorderly conduct at a restaurant in Southfield, Michigan.

=== Lloyd Carr (1995–2007) ===
Following Moeller's resignation, Lloyd Carr took over as Michigan's head football coach. Carr held the position for 13 years from 1995 to 2007. Under Carr, the Wolverines compiled a record of 122–40 and won or shared five Big Ten Conference titles (1997, 1998, 2000, 2003, and 2004). Carr's 1997 team was declared the national champion by the Associated Press. Carr also compiled a record of 19–8 against teams ranked in the Top 10.

=== Rich Rodriguez (2008–2010) ===
In December 2007, Rich Rodriguez was hired as the head football coach at Michigan. Prior to joining Michigan, Rodriguez was the head coach at West Virginia University for seven years. In his three seasons as Michigan's head coach, Rodriguez compiled a record of 15–22, including a mark of 6–18 in Big Ten Conference games. His winning percentage of .405 overall and .250 in Big Ten play are the lowest among all 19 individuals to serve as Michigan's head football coach.

=== Brady Hoke (2011–2014) ===
Brady Hoke was hired as Michigan's new head football coach in January 2011. He had previously been the defensive line coach at Michigan (1995–2002) and a head coach at Ball State University (2003–2008) and San Diego State University (2009–2010). In his first season as Michigan's head football coach, Hoke compiled a record of 11–2, as Michigan finished 6–2 in conference and second place in the newly formed Big Ten Legends Division and then won the Sugar Bowl. His 2013 squad finished 7–6 overall and 3–5 in Big Ten play. They lost the Buffalo Wild Wings Bowl by a score of 31–14 to Kansas State. In 2014, the Wolverines finished 5–7. This marked only the third season since 1975 in which Michigan missed a bowl game. On December 2, 2014, Hoke was fired after four seasons. Hoke compiled a 31–20 record, including an 18–14 record in Big Ten play.

=== Jim Harbaugh (2015–2023) ===
On December 30, 2014, Jim Harbaugh was hired as the head football coach at the University of Michigan. Harbaugh has been a head coach since 2004. He was previously the head coach of the San Diego Toreros (2004–2006), the Stanford Cardinal (2007–2010), and the San Francisco 49ers of the National Football League (NFL) (2011–2014). He is the first Michigan head coach to lose his first five games against Ohio State. In 2021, Harbaugh led Michigan to a victory over Ohio State and the program's first Big Ten championship in 17 years. In 2022, Michigan beat Ohio State on the road for the first time since 2000 and repeated as Big Ten champions for the first time since 2004. In 2023, Harbaugh led Michigan to the national championship, beating Washington 34–13.

=== Sherrone Moore (2024–2025) ===
On January 26, 2024, Michigan hired Sherrone Moore as the head coach following Harbaugh's departure to the Los Angeles Chargers. On December 10, 2025, the University of Michigan announced Moore had been fired for cause due to "credible evidence" that Moore engaged in an inappropriate relationship with a staff member. He ended his tenure as head coach with a 16–8 record. Biff Poggi served as Michigan’s interim head coach in 2025.

=== Kyle Whittingham (2026-present) ===
On December 26, 2025, Michigan hired Kyle Whittingham as the 22nd head football coach. He spent his previous 21 seasons as the head coach at the University of Utah.
