= Frederick Henninger =

Frederick Henninger may refer to:

- F. A. Henninger (1865–1944), architect in Nebraska
- Frederick W. Henninger (1873–1919), American football player and coach
