= Bert Carr =

American football player (1870–1930)

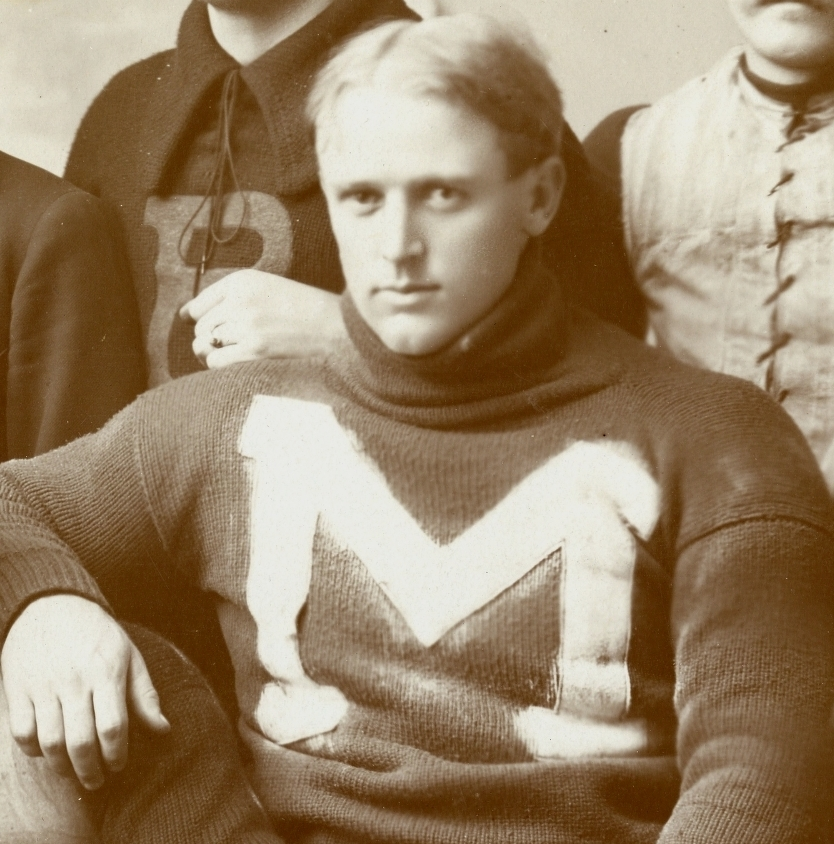
- Carr cropped from 1894 Michigan Wolverines football team portrait

Profile
- Positions: Guard, Center

Personal information
- Born: c. 1870; New York, U.S.
- Died: April 13, 1930 (aged 60); Grand Rapids, Michigan, U.S.
- Listed height: 6 ft 1 in (1.85 m)
- Listed weight: 205 lb (93 kg)

Career history
- 1890: Albion
- 1894–1896: Michigan

Bert Mather Carr (c. 1870 – April 13, 1930) was an American football player. He played college football at the guard and center positions for Adrian College in 1890 and for the University of Michigan from 1894 to 1896. In September 1896, the Chicago Daily Tribune called him "the best center in the West." In 1902, he was selected as the greatest guard in the history of the Michigan football program. He later worked as a medical doctor in Cedar Springs, Michigan.

== Early life ==
Carr was born in New York in approximately 1870. He moved to Kent County, Michigan, as a boy. At the time of the 1880 United States census, he was living in Cedar Springs, Michigan with his parents, Jesse A. Carr, a New York native, and Ester Carr, a Pennsylvania native.

Carr began his college education as a freshman at Albion College in 1890. While attending Albion, he played at the left guard position on the varsity football team in 1890. He played on the 1890 team that lost to the University of Michigan by a score of 16–0.

== University of Michigan ==
Carr later enrolled at the University of Michigan where he was a student in the Department of Medicine from 1893 to 1897. He was a member of the Sigma Chi fraternity. While attending the University of Michigan, he played college football for the Michigan Wolverines football team from 1894 to 1896. During Carr's three years with the team, the Wolverines compiled a record of 26–3–1.

During the 1894 season, Carr was a key player on the Michigan team that compiled a 9–1–1 record and defeated Cornell, marking "the first time in collegiate football history that a western school defeated an established power from the east." The 1895 team compiled an 8–1 record, won seven of their games by shutouts, and outscored their opponents by a combined score of 266 to 14. Following the 1895 season, the team's manager Charles A. Baird wrote: "At center was the broad-shouldered Carr who has not let a man through him this year and who plays always for the success of the team and not for individual glory." In September 1896, the Chicago Daily Tribune wrote: "Bert Carr, who was easily the best center in the West last year, will be found in his old position this fall. Carr is a large, powerful man, a hard worker, and an invaluable man to the team."

In January 1897, new rules were adopted limited players to four years of college football. Carr was the one player on the Michigan team to be debarred as a result of the rule change. Having already played four years of varsity football at Michigan, and having also played even earlier at Albion, he was ineligible to play another year of college football. May 1897, Carr was hired as one of three new coaches for the 1897 football team: Gustave Ferbert as head coach and Carr and Frederick W. Henninger as assistants. He instead completed his medical education in Chicago during the 1897–1898 academic year. He attended the University of Illinois College of Physicians and Surgeons and received the degree of Doctor of Medicine and Surgery in 1898.

In 1902, he was selected as the greatest guard in Michigan history and a member of Michigan's all-time football team. In announcing its all-time Michigan team, The Michigan Alumnus concluded that Carr was probably also the best center the Wolverines ever had and noted:

"The part of the line which Carr guarded, whether at center or alongside the center, was always impregnable. His broad shoulders and powerful frame were the admiration of the team's supporters and a stumbling block for its opponents. His playing was steady and consistent, and I should give him first place among Michigan's guards. . . . Carr could always be counted on for the best that was in him, and steadiness clothed him like a mantle."

== Later life ==
After completing his medical studies, Carr returned to his hometown of Cedar Springs where he established a medical practice.

At the time of the 1910 United States census, Carr was living with his father, Jesse A. Carr, on the family farm in Nelson Township, Michigan. At the time of the 1930 United States census, Carr was living in Cedar Springs and was listed as having no employment. In April 1930, he died at St. Mary's Hospital in Grand Rapids, Michigan. The cause of death was listed as erysipelas of the face and scalp and myocarditis. He was 60 years old at the time of his death.
