= George Greenleaf =

American football player and medical doctor (1874–1936)

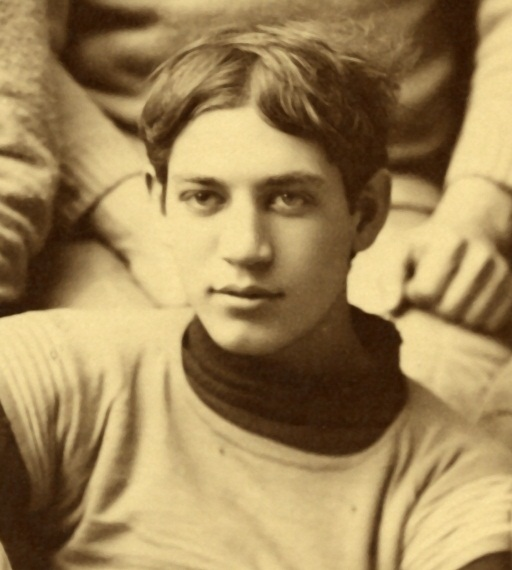
- Greenleaf, 1893

Biographical details
- Born: September 29, 1874; Milwaukee, Wisconsin, U.S.
- Died: May 30, 1936 (aged 61); Chicago, Illinois, U.S.

Playing career
- 1893–1896: Michigan
- Positions: Quarterback, end

Coaching career (HC unless noted)
- 1899: Miami (OH)

Head coaching record
- Overall: 1–5

George Franklin Greenleaf Jr. (September 29, 1874 – May 30, 1936) was an American college football player and coach and physician. He played football at the University of Michigan as a from quarterback and end 1893 to 1896. Greenleaf served as the head football coach at Miami University in Oxford, Ohio for one season, in 1899, compiling a record of 1–5. He later practiced medicine in Indiana and Illinois.

== Biography ==
A native of Brazil, Indiana, Greenleaf was the son of George F. Greenleaf Sr. (1848–1900) and Agnes Dalgleish Staines. He played college football at the University of Michigan and was the quarterback of the 1893 and 1894 Michigan Wolverines football teams. He played at the end position on the 1895 and 1896 teams. He graduated from Michigan's Department of Medicine and Surgery, and became a medical doctor practicing in Indiana and Illinois. In 1899, he was the head coach of the Miami University football team, although he was unpaid. In February 1914, he married Estella Fuquay at Evansville, Indiana. In his later years, he practiced medicine at 561 Diversity Parkway and lived at 2745 Pine Grove Avenue in Chicago. In May 1936, he died of hypertension and cerebral hemorrhage at his Chicago apartment.

== Head coaching record ==
Year	Team	Overall	Conference	Standing	Bowl/playoffs
Miami Redskins (Independent) (1899)
1899	Miami	1–5			
Miami:		1–5			
Total:		1–5			
