= John A. Bloomingston =

American athlete, coach, and attorney (1874–1942)

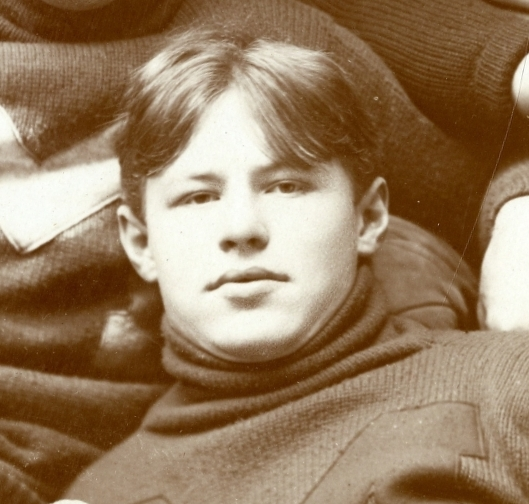
- John A. Bloomingston, 1895
- Born: April 28, 1874; Chicago, Illinois, US
- Died: January 8, 1942 (aged 67); Philadelphia, Pennsylvania, US
- Education: University of Michigan
- Known for: Athlete, attorney

John Albert Bloomingston (April 28, 1874 –January 8, 1942) was an American attorney and football and baseball player and coach. He played at the fullback position for the University of Michigan football teams in 1894 and 1895. He was the leading scorer on the 1895 Michigan Wolverines football team that outscored opponents 266 to 14 and won the school's first Western football championship. He scored as many as 32 points in a single game. The Wolverines compiled a record of 17–2–1 in Bloomingston's two years as the starting fullback and never lost a game against a Western team. After graduating from Michigan, he became one of the best known trial lawyers in Chicago, where he practiced for more than 40 years.

== Early years ==
Bloomingston was born in Chicago in 1874. His father was an immigrant from Switzerland and the editor and proprietor of the Investigator, one of the oldest insurance papers in the west. His stepmother, Frances E. Drake Bloomingston, the second wife of John S. Bloomingston, was a member of the Daughters of the American Revolution and a descendant of Col. Samuel Drake and William Hooker.

== Education and athletics ==
Bloomingston attended the Pennsylvania Military College in Chester, Pennsylvania, and subsequently enrolled at the University of Michigan. While attending Michigan, Bloomingston was one of the university's best athletes. He played fullback for the Michigan Wolverines football team and second base for the Michigan Wolverines baseball team. He received a Bachelor of Law degree from the University of Michigan in 1896.

=== 1894 football team ===
In 1894, Bloomingston was the starting fullback for the 1894 Michigan Wolverines football team that finished the season with a record of 9–1–1 and outscored opponents 244 to 84. On November 24, 1894, he helped Michigan defeat Cornell, 12–4, marking the first time Michigan had beaten one of the elite Eastern football teams. Five days later, Bloomingston kicked the goal from touchdown which proved to be the winning points in a 6–4 win over Chicago.

=== 1895 baseball team ===
In the spring of 1895, Bloomingston played second base for the Michigan baseball team. On May 30, 1895, he led Michigan to an 11–0 win over Cornell at the Detroit Athletic Club field in Detroit. A crowd of 4,000 watched, the Detroit Free Press wrote that "Bloomingston carried off the batting honors with two homers and a single." Bloomingston's first home run came in the fifth inning and was described by the Free Press as follows:

Bloomingston came to bat with blood in his eye. He caught one of [Cornell pitcher] Smith's twisters on the nose and the ball landed in the crowd in the stand in left field. ... In a second the stands and the field were a mass of yellow and blue and 'Bloomy,' as the crowd called him, got a 'football ovation.'

His second home run came in the seventh inning: "The crowd yelled for another home run, and he didn't do a thing but plant the ball over the carriages lined up along the fence in left field."

=== 1895 football team ===
In the fall of 1895, Bloomingston was the leading scorer for the 1895 Michigan Wolverines football team that outscored opponents 266 to 14 and won the school's first western football championship. Although scoring records are incomplete, a newspaper account of an October 1895 game against Adelbert indicates that Bloomingston scored 32 points, as he ran for three touchdowns (four points each) and kicked 10 goals from touchdown (worth two points each). the following week, Bloomingston added 20 points (two touchdowns and seven goals from touchdown) against Lake Forest. One week later, Bloomingston added 18 points (one touchdown and seven goals from touchdown) in a 42–0 victory over Oberlin. Bloomingston's talent as a kick returner were also on display against Oberlin, as he returned a kickoff 45 yards in the second half for the longest play of the game. Bloomingston gained 50 yards in one run against Oberlin, and his field goal attempt from the 50-yard line went wide by only five feet.

The sole loss of the 1895 season was a 4–0 setback against Harvard in Cambridge, Massachusetts. One week after the Harvard game, Bloomingston kicked two goals from touchdown to give Michigan the winning margin in a 12–10 victory over Purdue.

Bloomingston finished his Michigan football career by scoring eight points (a touchdown and two goals from touchdown) in Michigan's 12–0 victory over Chicago on Thanksgiving Day. Bloomingston's running was reportedly the high point of the game. A Chicago newspaper described one run by Bloomingston as follows:

Chicago could not gain, and Neel was forced to punt again. Bloomingston received the ball, and, dodging the tacklers, who sought to bring him to the ground, ran back the entire length of the kick. It was a splendid performance, and no small part of the applause the hero received came from Chicago throats.

The Detroit Free Press wrote: "Bloomingston played the star game of the day, easily out-punting Neel and bucking the line like a battering ram. One of his kicks was seventy yards in the air and went the whole length of the field." Following the game The World of New York wrote that the Michigan players had "clinched their claim to the Western championship."

In December 1895, the Chicago Daily Inter Ocean picked Bloomingston as the fullback on its All-Western team. The newspaper wrote, "Every one in the West, with the possible exception of the Wisconsin men, unites in the selection of Bloomington [sic?] as full back. Those who saw the sensational runs made in the game with Chicago last Thanksgiving day can possibly have no other opinion. Sure at goals, a strong punter, and a wonderful runner, he has but few rivals."

=== Disbarment ===
In June 1896, Bloomingston was disbarred from participation in University of Michigan college athletics. The action followed an investigation of student athletes participating in professional baseball conducted by the university's board of control of athletics. Bloomingston appeared before the board and admitted that he had played professional baseball for compensation under an assumed name for "the Flint picked-up nine." Another member of the Michigan baseball team were also disbarred, an action which "stirred up quite a hornet's nest in athletic circles." Minor league baseball records indicate that Bloomingston also played professional baseball in 1895 for the Owosso Colts in the Michigan State League.

=== Minor league baseball and other athletic competition ===
During the fall of 1896, Bloomingston served as coach and quarterback for the football team of the Michigan Military Academy at Orchard Lake, Michigan.

In the spring of 1897, Bloomingston returned to Chicago and was appointed the player-coach of the Bankers' Athletic Club baseball team. He also appeared in eight games for the New England Whalers of the New England League in 1897.

== Legal career ==
Bloomingston returned to Chicago in 1897 and was admitted that year to the Illinois bar. He was, according to the Chicago Daily Tribune, "for 40 years one of Chicago's best known trial lawyers." He also served as a director of the Yellow Cab Company. He maintained his office at 160 North La Salle Street.

== Family and death ==
Bloomingston married Edna Fowler Bloomingston, and they had a daughter, Caryl. Their daughter married E. Cummings "Ted" Parker in 1937, and they had twin sons.

Bloomingston's wife died in October 1940. In January 1942, Bloomingston died of an apparent heart attack at the Benjamin Franklin Hotel in Philadelphia, while on a business trip. At the time of his death, Bloomingston was a resident of Chicago, having his home at 210 East Pearson Street.

== See also ==
- 1894 Michigan Wolverines football team
- 1895 Michigan Wolverines football team
