= J. De Forest Richards =

American football player and banker (1874–1949)

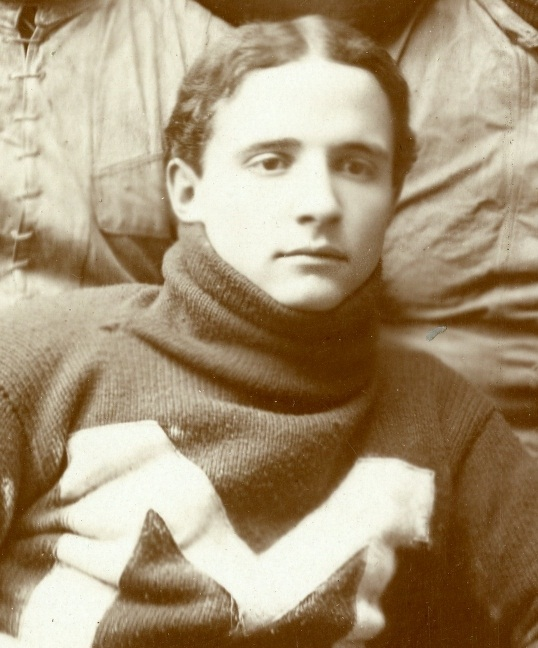
- Born: November 28, 1874; Camden, Alabama, U.S.
- Died: September 5, 1949 (aged 74); Chicago, Illinois, U.S.
- Education: University of Michigan
- Known for: Football player/Banker

J. De Forest Richards (November 28, 1874 – September 5, 1949) was an American football player and banker. He was the son of the fifth Governor of Wyoming and played college football at the University of Michigan from 1894 to 1897. He later had a career as a banker in Douglas, Wyoming; Omaha, Nebraska; and Chicago, Illinois.

== Early years ==
Richards was born in 1874 in Camden, Alabama, the only son of DeForest Richards. His father was a New Hampshire native who moved to Alabama during the Reconstruction era , serving as the sheriff of Wilcox County, Alabama, and operating a tannery and mercantile business. His father moved to Nebraska when Richards was 12 years old. Richards attended "public school in Nebraska" for two years before being sent to St. Paul's School l in Concord, New Hampshire. After graduating from St. Paul's in 1892, Richards moved to Casper, Wyoming, where his father had established a store under the name Richards, Cunningham & Co.

== University of Michigan ==
In 1894, Richards enrolled at the University of Michigan. While at Michigan, he played college football. He was a halfback for the 1894 Michigan Wolverines football team and a quarterback for the 1895, 1896 and 1897 teams.

== Business career ==
He completed his education at Michigan in 1898 and returned to Wyoming where he became an assistant cashier at the First National Bank of Douglas in Douglas, Wyoming. In 1898, his father was elected Governor of Wyoming and served in that office until his death in April 1903. Richards was elected vice president of the First National Bank of Douglas. In January 1901. He also served as the treasurer of the Richards-Coombs Co., which operated a sheep ranch south of Douglas, and treasurer of the Chambers Live Stock Co., which operated a ranch on the Cheyenne River in Weston County, Wyoming.

In 1909, Richards moved from Douglas, Wyoming, to Omaha, Nebraska, where he continued to work in the banking business. In 1918, he moved to Chicago, Illinois, where he became involved in the manufacture of gas engines.

In 1925, Richards joined the National Boulevard Bank in Chicago. He became president of the bank in 1931 and was "credited with increasing its resources and services."

In September 1949, Richards died in Chicago after a short illness . He was survived by his wife, Gertrude Richards, and was buried at the Rosehill Cemetery.
