= Heninger =

Heninger is a surname. It is the surname of:

- Earl Heninger, most valuable player for Purdue in the 1952 Big Ten Conference football season
- Eugène Heninger, cyclist in the 1914 Tour de France
- Howard P. Heninger, president of Calgary Alberta Temple
- Nadia Heninger, American cryptographer
- Nick Heninger, freshman player on the 2016 Utah Utes football team
- Otto Heninger, alias of Nazi official Adolf Eichmann
- Owen P. Heninger, superintendent in the 1940s of the Utah State Hospital
- William K. Heninger, representative in the 2nd Arizona Territorial Legislature

== See also ==
- Heninger Elementary School, in Santa Ana, California
- Henninger
