= Forrest M. Hall =

American football player and coach (1869–1961)

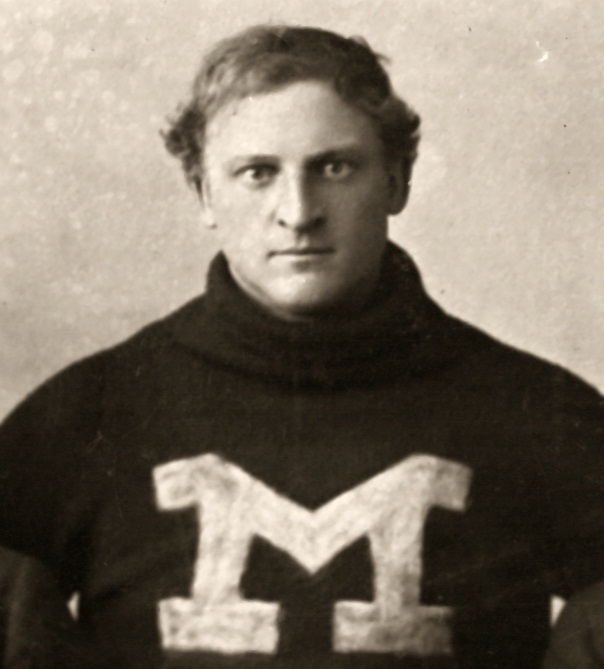
- Hall cropped from 1895 Michigan team portrait

Biographical details
- Born: November 30, 1869; Bloomfield Township, Logan County, Ohio, U.S.
- Died: May 1, 1961 (aged 91)

Playing career
- 1892–1893: Princeton
- 1895: Michigan
- 1896–1897: Butte Athletic Club
- Position: Guard

Coaching career (HC unless noted)
- 1894: Auburn
- 1898: Michigan (assistant)
- 1901: Centre
- 1903: Heidelberg
- 1909: Michigan (assistant)

Head coaching record
- Overall: 9–10–2

Forrest Maynard "Buck" Hall, sometimes listed as Forrest Maywood Hall and Forrest Mayward Hall (November 30, 1869 – May 1, 1961), was an American football player and coach. He played college football at Princeton University in 1892 and 1893, and was a member of Princeton's undefeated 1893 national championship team. He served as the head football coach at Auburn University in 1894, compiling a record of 1–3, but also leading the team to the highest point total in school history, a 94–0 victory over Georgia Tech. He later played at the guard position for the 1895 Michigan Wolverines football team and for the Butte Athletic Club in 1896 and 1897. He also served as an assistant football coach at Michigan during the 1898 and 1909 seasons.

== Early years ==
Hall was born in Bloomfield Township in Logan County, Ohio, in 1869. His parents were John Hall and Eliza (Bughman) Hall. At the time of the 1880 United States Census, he was attending school at Pease Township, Belmont County, Ohio. His permanent residence was with his mother Eliza Hall (and sister Nevada Hall) in Bloomfield Township. Hall was raised in Jackson Center in Shelby County, Ohio. He attended preparatory school at Oberlin College during the 1890–91 academic year.

== Princeton ==
Hall enrolled at Princeton University in 1892 and studied there for two years as a special student. He also played at the guard position for the Princeton Tigers football team in 1892 and 1893. The 1893 Princeton Tigers compiled an 11–0 record and has been recognized as that season's national championship team.

== Auburn ==
Hall at Auburn

In the fall of 1894, Hall served as the head football coach at Auburn University. He was the third head coach with an Ivy League background to be hired at Auburn. Auburn officials reportedly thought that "with a Princeton man (F. M. Hall) at the helm," they had the right man in charge of the football team.

Hall's team outscored opponents 106 to 48, but compiled a record of 1–3. Auburn's 94–0 victory over Georgia Tech in Atlanta was the highlight of Auburn's 1894 season. The score remains the highest single game point total, and the greatest margin of victory, in the history of Auburn Tigers football. Hall coached only one year at Auburn and was replaced by John Heisman.

== Michigan ==
After leaving Auburn, Hall enrolled in the law department at the University of Michigan. He received a Bachelor of Laws degree from Michigan in 1896. While attending Michigan, Hall played at the right guard position for the 1895 Michigan Wolverines football team that compiled an 8–1 record, won seven of their games by shutouts, and outscored their opponents by a combined total of 266 to 14. Hall also competed in the shot put for Michigan's track team. In June 1895, at the Western Intercollegiate Amateur Association meet in Chicago, Hall won the shot put event with a record-breaking distance of over 44 feet. Hall held the University of Michigan shot put record (44 feet 3 inches) until 1904 when it was broken by Olympic gold medalist Ralph Rose.

== Later years ==
After graduating from Michigan, Hall moved to Butte, Montana, where he practiced law and played football for the Butte Athletic Club. In February 1898, Hall was hired as the head football coach at Michigan after Gustave Ferbert announced that he would not return. At the time of his hiring, the Detroit Free Press wrote of Hall: "His ability to coach the line men is unquestioned, and his general knowledge of the game will make him a splendid man for the position." In the end, Ferbert did return as the head coach, and Hall was an assistant coach for the 1898 Michigan Wolverines football team that compiled a 10–0 record and won Michigan's first Western Conference championship.

At the time of the 1900 United States census, Hall was living with his mother, Eliza Hall, in Jackson Township, Shelby County, Ohio. He was employed as an attorney-at-law. He also served as the head football coach at Centre College in Danville, Kentucky during the 1901 season. In November 1901, The Michigan Alumnus reported that Hall was practicing law at Jackson Center, Ohio. In 1903, he was the head football coach at Heidelberg College in Tiffin, Ohio. In 1909, he returned to Ann Arbor as an assistant coach under head coach Fielding H. Yost for the 1909 Michigan Wolverines football team. At the time of the 1910 United States census, Hall was living in a rooming house operated by Victoria Doty in Springfield, Missouri. He was employed by a packing company. At the time of the 1930 United States census, he was living with his wife, Victoria, in Springfield, Missouri. He was employed as the proprietor of a whole nut house.

== Head coaching record ==
Year	Team	Overall	Conference	Standing	Bowl/playoffs
Auburn Tigers (Independent) (1894)
1894	Auburn	1–3			
Auburn:		1–3			
Centre (Independent) (1901)
1901	Centre	5–3			
Centre:		5–3			
Heidelberg (Independent) (1903)
1903	Heidelberg	3–4–2			
Heidelberg:		3–4–2			
Total:		9–10–2			
