= Daniel Henninger =

American journalist (born 1945/46)

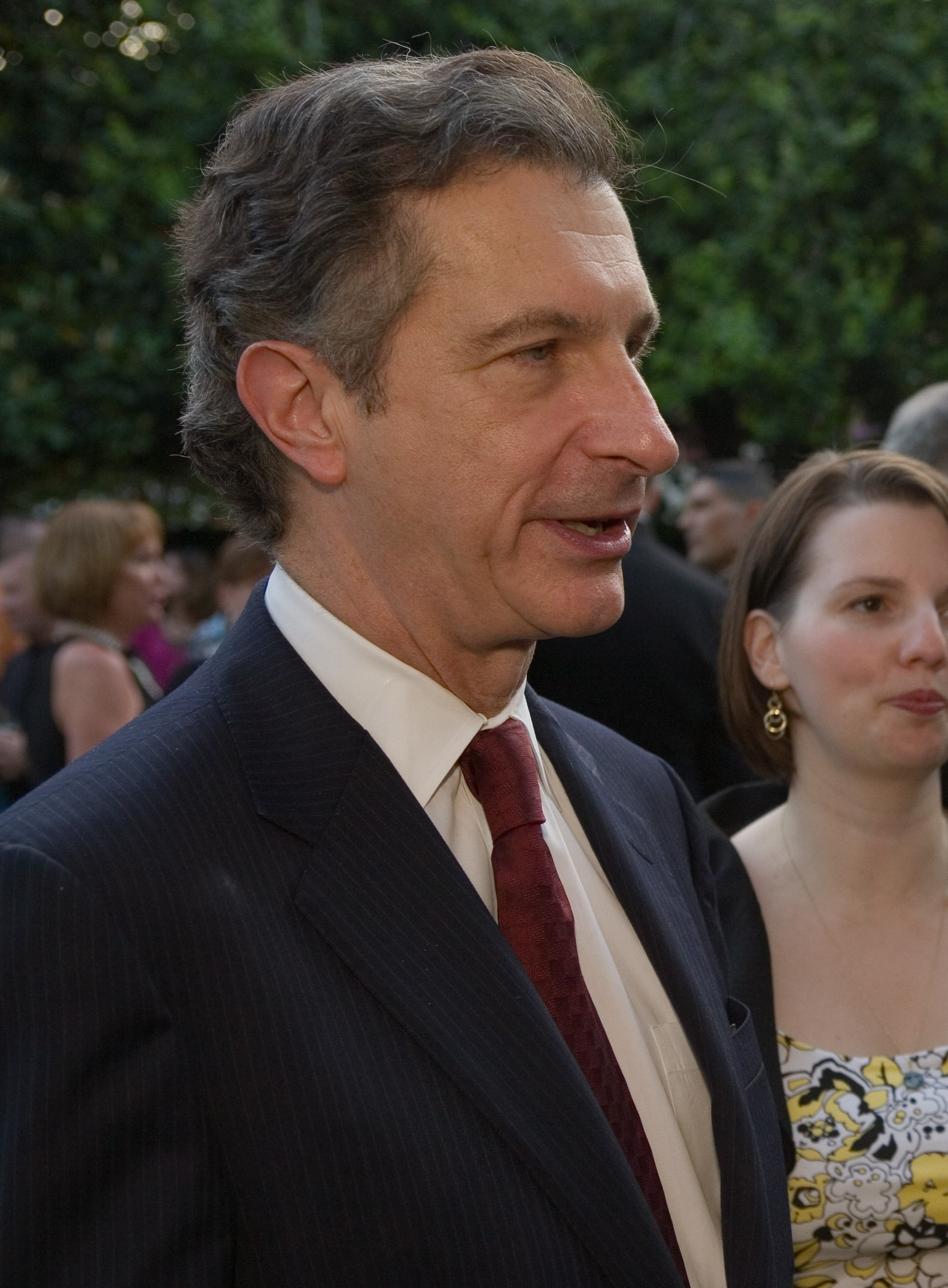
- Born: 1945 or 1946 (age 80–81); Cleveland, Ohio, US
- Education: Georgetown University
- Occupation: Journalist

Daniel Henninger is an American commentator. He serves as the deputy editorial page director of The Wall Street Journal, and is a Fox News contributor.

== Early life ==
Henninger was born in Cleveland, Ohio to David R. Henninger and Aileen M. Henninger. His younger brother is Rev. Mark G. Henninger, SJ. Daniel Henninger is a graduate of Georgetown University's Edmund A. Walsh School of Foreign Service.

== Career ==
Henninger serves as the deputy editorial page director of The Wall Street Journal, and is a contributor to Fox News. He also writes a column named "Wonder Land", which had appeared in the Journal every Thursday starting the summer of 2001 until January 30, 2025. In the 1980s he wrote most of the Journal's editorials on drug regulation. He is a frequent guest on the Saturday Fox News show Journal Editorial Report, in which he discusses current issues with fellow editorial page writers and guests. (A transcript of the discussion appears on OpinionJournal.com the following Monday.)

He won the Gerald Loeb Award for commentary in 1985; the 1995 American Society of Newspaper Editors' Distinguished Writing Award for editorial writing; and the 1997 National Journalism Award for editorial writing. He shared in the staff of The Wall Street Journal's 2002 Pulitzer Prize for Breaking News Reporting on 9/11.

== Personal life ==
Henninger is a onetime resident of Ridgewood, New Jersey.

== Stances ==
Henninger argues pro-Palestine protests are associated with elements of anti-Semitism and that the protesters "add to the generalized sense among the American public that their country is running off the rails." He opposes progressive policing policies and considers them to be "pro-criminal." Henninger also argues in favor of Israel in his columns.
