= James Baird (civil engineer) =

American civil engineer, football player and coach (1873-1953)

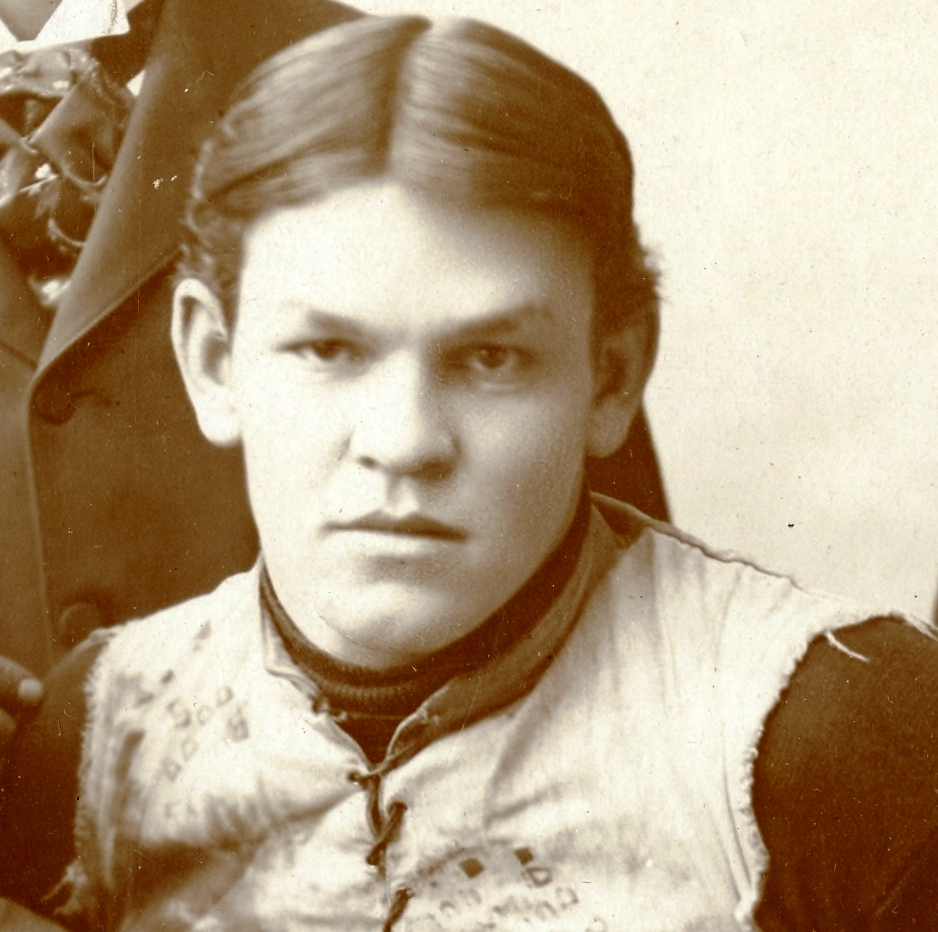

Biographical details
- Born: May 18, 1873; Vanceburg, Kentucky
- Died: May 16, 1953 (aged 79); Tucson, Arizona

Playing career
- 1892–1895: Michigan
- Position: Quarterback

Coaching career (HC unless noted)
- 1897–1898: Michigan (assistant)

James Baird (May 18, 1873 – May 16, 1953) was an American civil engineer, football player and coach. He played football for the University of Michigan from 1892 to 1895 and was captain of the 1894 team. He was also an assistant football coach at Michigan from 1897 to 1898. He worked for the George A. Fuller Co. for 23 years and eventually became its president. He later formed his own construction company called the James Baird Company. Baird directed the construction of many important buildings, including the Flatiron Building, Lincoln Memorial, Arlington Memorial Amphitheater, and Tomb of the Unknown Soldier.

== Early years ==
Baird was born in Vanceburg, Kentucky, and attended high schools in Chicago, Illinois and Ann Arbor, Michigan. His father, Lyman Beecher Baird (September 6, 1833 – October 24, 1907), was an Ohio native who worked as a farmer and merchant. In the 1880 United States census, Lyman Baird was identified as a grocer in Vanceburg. He also operated a hardware store in Vanceburg that burned in the 1880s. His mother was Frances Amelia (Halbert) Baird, and he had an older brother Charles A. Baird (born c. 1869).

== University of Michigan ==
He enrolled at the University of Michigan where he played quarterback for the football team from 1892 to 1895. He was captain of the 1894 Michigan team that finished with a 9–1–1 record and recorded the school's first victory against one of the Eastern football powers with a 12–4 win over Cornell at the Detroit Athletic Club's field in Detroit.

Baird played quarterback for the 1895 Michigan team that compiled an 8–1 record, won seven of their games by shutouts, and outscored their opponents by a combined score of 266 to 14. The sole loss of the 1895 season was a 4–0 setback against the Harvard Crimson, then one of the three great football powers. Michigan finished the season with a 12–0 win over Western rival, Amos Alonzo Stagg's Chicago Maroons. Undefeated against Western opponents, the 1895 Wolverines laid claim to the Western football championship. At the end of the 1895 season, one Chicago newspaper, the Daily Inter Ocean selected Baird as the substitute quarterback on its All-Western team. Baird studied civil engineering at Michigan and received his bachelor's degree in 1896. Baird's brother Charles A. Baird was the manager of the 1894 and 1895 football teams at Michigan and later became the university's first athletic director.

After graduating, Baird served as an assistant football coach at Michigan from 1897 to 1898, including the 1898 Michigan team that won the school's first Western Conference championship. At the end of the 1898 season, the Chicago Inter-Ocean singled out Baird for his work in coaching the Michigan team:

"They had been a disorganized team three weeks before, but Jimmy Baird had come on to maneuver the backs, stop the fumbling, and put snap and life into the team. As a coach, he has been a wonderful success. No one who knows his record as a captain can doubt that he is a worker of miracles to whose power Michigan's wonderful improvement is due. He was continually working over his men or defensive play, when he played the game himself, slapping them on the back, cheering up one, and swearing at another, until Michigan's team became a power and a terror. This year he left his business to rush back at the last moment to lick the team into shape for a victory."

== Construction career ==
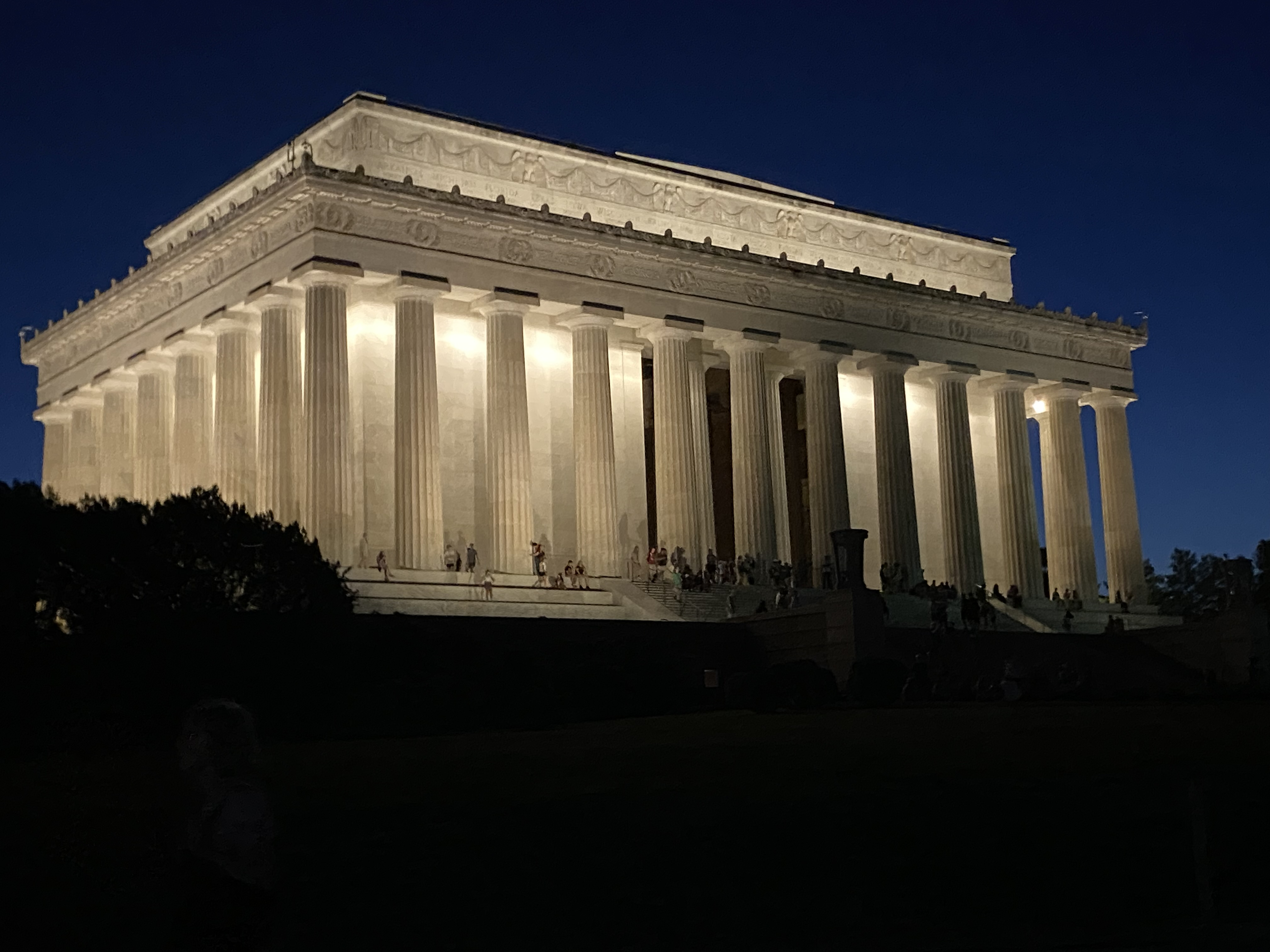
Lincoln Memorial

After graduating from Michigan, Baird had a successful career in the construction industry. He started as a timekeeper for the Guaranty Construction Co. of Chicago and then as an engineer for Moulton-Starrett Co. of Columbus, Ohio, and Pittsburgh, Pennsylvania. In 1899, Baird began a 23-year association with the George A. Fuller Co., a leading builder of skyscrapers and inventor of the modern contracting system. In December 1900, The New York Times wrote:

"No other firm in the world, perhaps, has played so large a part in revolutionizing the building trade as the George A. Fuller Company, and to it primarily is due the credit of having originated many of the actual construction methods now in use."

Baird began working for the Fuller Company in New York City and directed the erection of the Flatiron Building, the first steel-frame skyscraper in New York City. He moved to Boston in 1902 as the firm's general superintendent. He was transferred to Washington, D.C., in 1904 as a district manager. He rose through the ranks of the company to become vice president in 1910 and president in May 1922. While working with the Fuller Company, Baird supervised the construction of the Lincoln Memorial and the Arlington Memorial Amphitheater in 1916, the Commodore Hotel in 1919, the Tomb of the Unknown Soldier in 1921, and the Freer Gallery of Art in 1923. As the Lincoln Memorial neared completion, Baird wrote to World's Work magazine, "It is to be hoped that the Lincoln Memorial Building may exist for at least one thousand years, unless destroyed sooner by artificial means."

During World War I, Baird volunteered to construct cantonments for the U.S. Army to house 20,000 to 30,000 men. In November 1918, at the end of hostilities, Baird applied for a passport to travel to France and Belgium to represent the Fuller Company in selling building materials to be used in the post-war reconstruction efforts. Bernard Baruch, Chairman of the War Industries Board, wrote a letter in support of Baird's application in which he stated:

"This is to certify that I know Mr. James Baird personally and have known him practically all my life, and that I know him to be an American born citizen born in Vanceburg, Kentucky, about 45 years ago. I know his father also, an American citizen born in America."

In 1923, as a building boom created a shortage in skilled construction workers and supervisors, Baird served as Chairman of the Emergency Committee of the Mason Builders' Association. He was an outspoken advocate for additional funding for teaching the building trades in the schools.

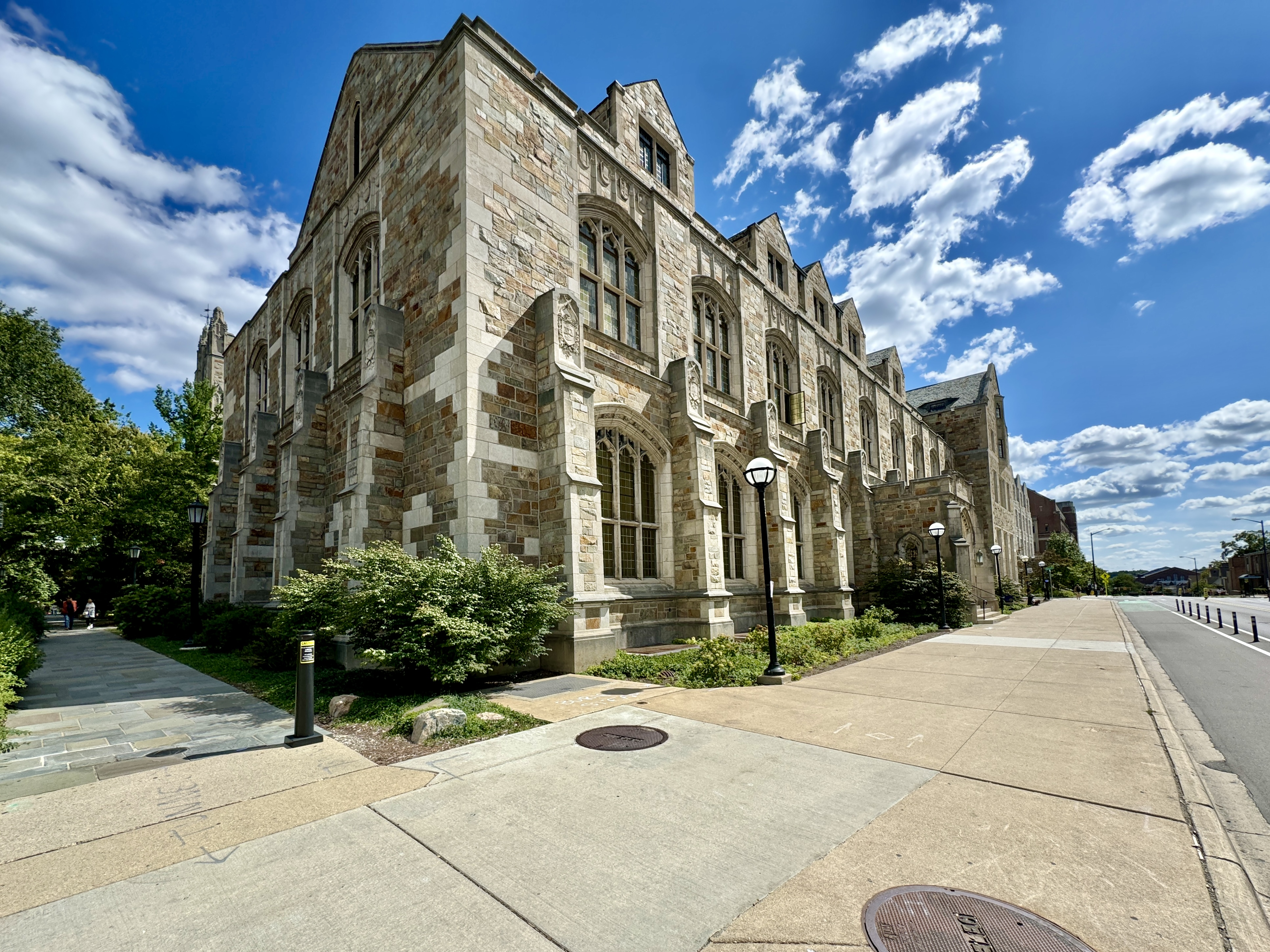
Hutchins Hall (1933) at the University of Michigan Law School

In 1925, Baird formed his own construction company, the James Baird Construction Co., Inc. Baird and his company specialized in large construction projects and were responsible for the construction of many notable structures, including the Folger Shakespeare Library in Washington, D.C., an addition to the Corcoran Gallery of Art that opened in 1928, the dome at St. Bartholomew's Episcopal Church, New York, the Brooklyn Printing Plant of The New York Times (design by Albert Kahn), Hutchins Hall and the Cook Dormitory at the University of Michigan Law School, the Aeolian Building in New York, the Ferncliff Mausoleum in Hartsdale, New York, and the original ten buildings of the Madeira School in McLean, Virginia, and the Reynolds Building in Winston-Salem, North Carolina. Upon completion of The New York Times' Brooklyn printing plant, the newspaper called the marble, granite, steel, copper and concrete the "jewel box" and noted that no expense had been spared in its construction.

== Family and philanthropy ==
Baird was married to Cornelia Cornelia Curtis (born May 1875) at Chicago on March 28, 1900. They lived in Manhattan, and later in Washington, D.C., and the Village of Scarsdale, New York, and had two sons, John C. Baird (born c. 1906) and Charles Baird (born c. 1909). Baird served as a trustee of the Village of Scarsdale from 1926 to 1927. He was also a member of the Scarsdale Golf Club and the American Guernsey Cattle Club of Peterborough, New Hampshire. In 1939, Baird donated his 600-acre (2.4 km^{2}) farm at Pleasant Valley, New York, to the State of New York for use as a park. The park is now known as James Baird State Park.

In 1936, Baird traveled to Tucson, Arizona, to seek relief from asthma. His health improved, and he made his permanent residence in Tucson for the last 17 years of his life. Baird was active in philanthropic causes in Tucson and donated $207,422 in 1948 to establish a scholarship fund at the University of Arizona. At the time Baird's gift was "the largest single scholarship gift ever made to the University of Arizona." In May 1951, Baird received an honorary degree of doctor of engineering from the University of Arizona in recognition of his work as an engineer, builder, contractor, business executive and philanthropist.

In January 1948, Baird welcome the University of Michigan Marching Band to Tucson as they returned from the 1948 Rose Bowl. He gave Michigan officials a tour of the University of Arizona campus and presented them with citrus from trees at the Baird residence at 4111 Calle El Centro in Tucson. Michigan's band conductor, William Revelli, told Baird the welcome received in Tucson was the most enthusiastic received and that the band members were pleased with the turnout.

In May 1953, Baird died two days short of his 80th birthday at St. Mary's Hospital in Tucson after a month's illness. Baird's widow died at Tucson in 1962. He was buried in the Baird family plot at Oakwood Cemetery in Chicago.

In recognition of his gifts to the University of Michigan, a species of snake, Tantilla bairdi, is named in his honor.
