= John W. Hollister =

American football player and coach (1869–1950)

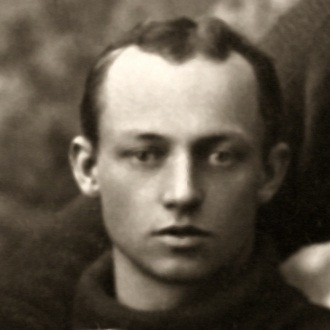
- Hollister cropped from 1895 Michigan Wolverines football team photograph

Biographical details
- Born: October 21, 1869; North Pawlet, Vermont, U.S.
- Died: March 8, 1950 (aged 80); Chicago, Illinois, U.S.

Playing career

Football
- early 1890s: Williams
- 1893, 1895: Michigan
- Position: Halfback

Coaching career (HC unless noted)

Football
- 1894–1895: Beloit
- 1896: Ole Miss
- 1898–1903: Beloit
- 1908–1910: Morningside

Baseball
- 1895: Beloit
- 1899–1904: Beloit

Administrative career (AD unless noted)
- 1898–1903: Beloit

Head coaching record
- Overall: 50–39–10 (football); 28–11 (baseball)

John Willis Hollister (October 21, 1869 – March 8, 1950) was an American college football player and coach. He served as the head football coach at Beloit College from 1894 to 1895 and again from 1898 to 1903, at the University of Mississippi (Ole Miss) in 1896, and at Morningside College from 1908 to 1910. Hollister played college football at Williams College and the University of Michigan

== Biography ==
Hollister was born in North Pawlet, Vermont, in 1869, the son of F. S. Hollister, "a traveling agent," and Julia L. Hollister. Hollister attended Middlebury College from 1889 to 1890 and received a bachelor of arts degree from Williams College in 1893. At Williams, he played football and baseball and "received high praise as an all-around athlete." He subsequently attended the Law Department of the University of Michigan from 1893 to 1896. While attending law school, Hollister played halfback for the 1893 and 1895 Michigan Wolverines football teams.

In the fall of 1894, Hollister took time off from his legal studies to accept a position as physical director and football coach at Beloit College. An account from the Beloit College Hall of Honor, to which Hollister was posthumously inducted in 1980, notes: "In 1894, Beloit alumni interested in seeing the athletic program expand provided funds to hire a coach for one year. The subsequent appointment of John Hollister as the first physical training instructor and coach began a rich athletic tradition at the College."

After serving the 1894–95 academic year at Beloit, Hollister returned to the University of Michigan to complete his legal education, receiving an Ll.B. degree in 1896. After completing his legal studies, Hollister became the head football coach at the University of Mississippi in 1896, leading the team to a 1–2 record.

In November 1897, Hollister married Margaret Hayden Reustle. They had a daughter, Margaret, in 1904.

In 1898, Hollister returned to coaching, serving as the football coach and athletic director from 1898 to 1903. He also served as the head football coach at Morningside College in Iowa from 1908 to 1910. Hollister compiled a career college football record of 50–39–10.

Hollister later worked as a publishing executive in Chicago. At the time of the 1920 Census, Hollister was listed as a resident of Chicago with a wife (Margaret, age 38) and a daughter (Margaret, age 15), and a job as an accountant in the machinery industry. He died on March 8, 1950, in Chicago.

== Head coaching record ==
=== Football ===
Year	Team	Overall	Conference	Standing	Bowl/playoffs
Beloit (Independent) (1894–1895)
1894	Beloit	6–3			
1895	Beloit	5–1			
Ole Miss Rebels (Independent) (1896)
1896	Ole Miss	1–2			
Ole Miss:		1–2			
Beloit (Independent) (1898–1903)
1898	Beloit	4–5–1			
1899	Beloit	5–2–2			
1900	Beloit	7–1–2			
1901	Beloit	6–3–3			
1902	Beloit	2–5			
1903	Beloit	3–7			
Beloit:		38–27–8			
Morningside (Independent) (1908–1910)
1908	Morningside	2–4–1			
1909	Morningside	4–3–1			
1910	Morningside	5–3			
Morningside:		11–10–2			
Total:		50–39–10			
