= Tantilla bairdi =

Conservation status
- Data Deficient (IUCN 3.1)

Scientific classification
- Kingdom: Animalia
- Phylum: Chordata
- Class: Reptilia
- Order: Squamata
- Suborder: Serpentes
- Family: Colubridae
- Genus: Tantilla
- Species: T. bairdi

Binomial name
- Tantilla bairdi L.C. Stuart, 1941

Species of snake

Tantilla bairdi, also known commonly as Baird's black-headed snake, is a species of snake in the subfamily Colubrinae of the family Colubridae. The species is endemic to Guatemala

== Description ==
Dorsally, Tantilla bairdi is brown, including the head, with a narrow yellow nuchal collar. Ventrally, it is red. The dorsal scales are arranged in 15 rows throughout the length of the body. It has about 163 ventral scales, and about 34 subcaudal scales.

== Geographic range ==
Tantilla bairdi is found in central Guatemala, in Alta Verapaz Department.

== Habitat ==
The preferred natural habitat of Tantilla bairdi is forest, at altitudes of approximately 1,500 m (4,900 ft).

== Behavior ==
Tantilla bairdi is terrestrial.

== Reproduction ==
Tantilla bairdi is oviparous.

== Etymology ==
The specific name, bairdi, is in honor of American civil engineer James Baird in recognition of his financial support of Stuart's research in Guatemala.
