= 1895 Michigan Wolverines football team =

American college football season

1895 Michigan Wolverines football
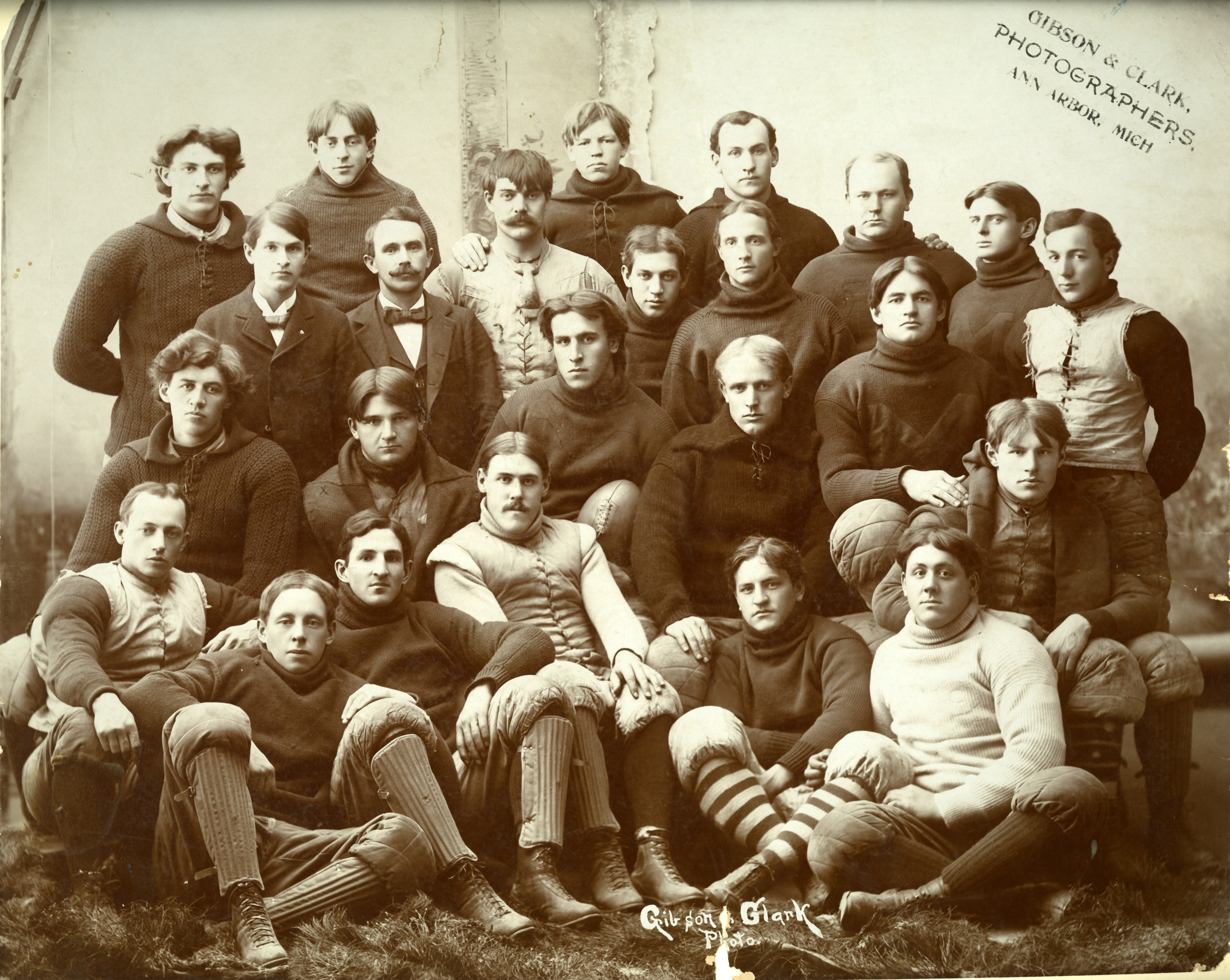
- Conference: Independent
- Record: 8–1
- Head coach: William McCauley (2nd season)
- Captain: Frederick W. Henninger
- Home stadium: Regents Field

1895 Midwestern college football independents records
	Conf.			Overall
Team	W	L	T	W		L		T
Miami (OH)		–		3	–	0	–	0
Carthage		–		2	–	0	–	0
Washington University		–		2	–	0	–	0
Michigan		–		8	–	1	–	0
Chicago		–		10	–	3	–	0
Wittenberg		–		5	–	2	–	0
Minnesota		–		7	–	3	–	0
Wisconsin		–		5	–	2	–	1
Wabash		–		6	–	3	–	0
Baldwin–Wallace		–		3	–	1	–	0
Notre Dame		–		3	–	1	–	0
Illinois		–		4	–	2	–	1
Buchtel		–		3	–	2	–	0
College of Emporia		–		3	–	2	–	0
Doane		–		3	–	2	–	0
Chicago P&S		–		3	–	2	–	1
Purdue		–		4	–	3	–	0
Indiana		–		4	–	3	–	1
Northwestern		–		6	–	5	–	0
Butler		–		2	–	2	–	0
Cincinnati		–		3	–	3	–	0
Kalamazoo		–		1	–	1	–	0
Michigan State Normal		–		3	–	3	–	0
North Dakota Agricultural		–		1	–	1	–	0
North Dakota		–		1	–	1	–	0
Ohio State		–		4	–	4	–	2
Iowa Agricultural		–		3	–	4	–	0
Ohio		–		2	–	3	–	0
Rush-Lake Forest		–		4	–	6	–	0
Ohio Wesleyan		–		2	–	4	–	1
Haskell		–		1	–	2	–	0
Iowa State Normal		–		1	–	2	–	0
Lake Forest		–		1	–	2	–	0
Northwestern Law		–		1	–	2	–	0
Drake		–		1	–	4	–	0

The 1895 Michigan Wolverines football team was an American football team that represented the University of Michigan in the 1895 college football season. In its second and final season under head coach William McCauley, the team compiled an 8–1 record, won seven of their games by shutouts, and outscored their opponents by a combined score of 266 to 14.

The 1895 Wolverines won their first five games by a combined score of 220 to 0. The sole loss of the season was a 4–0 setback against the Harvard Crimson, then one of the three great football powers. Michigan finished the season with a 12–0 win over Western rival, Amos Alonzo Stagg's Chicago Maroons. Undefeated against Western opponents, the 1895 Wolverines laid claim to the Western football championship.

Frederick W. Henninger was the team captain. Six Michigan players received All-Western honors: Gustave Ferbert (first-team halfback), John A. Bloomingston (first-team fullback), James Hooper (first-team guard), Frank Villa (first-team tackle), Henry M. Senter (first-team end), and James Baird (substitute quarterback).

== Schedule ==
Date	Opponent	Site	Result	Attendance
October 5	Michigan Military Academy	Regents Field; Ann Arbor, MI	W 34–0	
October 12	Detroit Athletic Club	Regents Field; Ann Arbor, MI	W 42–0	600
October 19	Western Reserve	Regents Field; Ann Arbor, MI	W 64–0	400
October 26	Rush–Lake Forest	Regents Field; Ann Arbor, MI	W 40–0	400
November 2	Oberlin	Regents Field; Ann Arbor, MI	W 42–0	700
November 9	at Harvard	Soldier's Field; Boston, MA	L 0–4	6,000
November 16	Purdue	Regents Field; Ann Arbor, MI	W 12–10	1,000
November 23	vs. Minnesota	Baseball Park; Detroit, MI (rivalry)	W 20–0	3,500
November 28	at Chicago	Marshall Field; Chicago, IL (rivalry)	W 12–0	10,000

== Game summaries ==
=== Game 1: Michigan Military Academy ===
Michigan Military Academy at Michigan

Team	1	2	Total
Michigan Military Academy	0	0	0
• Michigan	22	12	34

- Date: October 5
- Location: Regents Field, Ann Arbor, MI
- Referee: R.S. Freund

On October 5, 1895, Michigan defeated the Michigan Military Academy (M.M.A.) from Orchard Lake, Michigan, by a score of 34 to 0. The game was played in 20-minute halves at Regents Field in Ann Arbor.

Right halfback John W. Hollister scored Michigan's first touchdown, and fullback John A. Bloomingston kicked the goal from touchdown to give Michigan a 6-0 lead. Left halfback Gustave Ferbert then scored, and goal was made to extend the lead to 12-0. Hollister scored again, goal was made, and Michigan led, 18-0. Frank Villa scored the fourth touchdown, goal was missed, and Michigan led, 22-0, at halftime. In the second half, right tackle Jesse Yont scored a touchdown, goal was made, and Michigan led, 28-0. Herbert Gates, a substitute at right halfback, scored the final touchdown on a 40-yard run, and goal was made.

A newspaper account of the game noted that the score would have been more lopsided except that the Wolverines gave up the ball several times "on fouls and off-sides." The account also reported that "Michigan showed up vastly better than last year at this time in every feature of the game."

Michigan's lineup against M.M.A. was George Greenleaf (left end), Villa (left tackle), James Raikes (left guard), Bert Carr (center), Frederick W. Henninger (right guard), Yont (right tackle), Loomis Hutchinson (right end), William Franklin Holmes (quarterback), Ferbert and J. De Forest Richards (left halfback), Hollister and Gates (right halfback), and Bloomingston (fullback).

=== Game 2: Detroit Athletic Club ===
Detroit Athletic Club at Michigan

Team	1	2	Total
Detroit Athletic Club	0	0	0
• Michigan	20	22	42

- Date: October 12
- Location: Regents Field, Ann Arbor, MI
- Game attendance: 600

On October 12, 1895, Michigan defeated the Detroit Athletic Club (D.A.C.), 42-0, at Regents Field in Ann Arbor. The game began shortly after 3:00 p.m. and was played in 25-minute halves in front of a crowd of 600 spectators.

Michigan scored the first touchdown of the game 30 seconds after the game had commenced on a 70-yard end run by the quarterback and Wyoming-native, J. DeForest Richards. Tackle Jesse Yont from Nebraska was the high scorer with 16 points four touchdowns. Fullback John A. Bloomingston from Chicago scored 14 points on a touchdown and five goals after touchdown. (Under 1895 rules, a touchdown was scored as four points, and a successful kick for a "goal after touchdown" was scored as two points.) Halfback John W. Hollister added three touchdowns.

Michigan's lineup against the D.A.C. was George Greenleaf (left end), Frank Villa (left tackle), John McLain Johnson (left guard), Carr (center), Frederick W. Henninger (right guard), Yont (right tackle), Hollister (right end), James Baird (quarterback), Gustave Ferbert (left halfback), Richards (right halfback), and Bloomingston (fullback).

=== Game 3: Western Reserve ===
Western Reserve at Michigan

Team	1	2	Total
Western Reserve	0	0	0
• Michigan	42	22	64

- Date: October 19
- Location: Regents Field, Ann Arbor, MI
- Game attendance: 400
- Referee: Cook (Cleveland)

On October 19, 1895, Michigan defeated the team from Cleveland's Western Reserve by a score of 64 to 0. The game began at 2:30 p.m. and was played in 40-minute halves at Regents Field in Ann Arbor. The margin of victory was a surprise as Western Reserve had won the Western football championship in 1894 and had narrowly lost to Eastern football power Cornell the previous week by a score of 12 to 4. Against Michigan, however, Western Reserve had the ball only five or six minutes in the entire games and, as one newspaper wrote, "was never in the hunt."

Michigan scored 11 touchdowns in the game, three by fullback John A. Bloomingston, two each by tackle Frank Villa and end Henry M. Senter, and single touchdowns by right guard Frederick W. Henninger, Jesse Yont, J. De Forest Richards, and halfback Gustave Ferbert. Bloominston also kicked 10 goals from touchdown giving him 32 points in the game.

A Chicago newspaper described Michigan's performance as follows: "Michigan's advantage in weight was great and the interference and general team plays showed great improvement. Michigan's gain was on the main short and fast dashes through the line and close in on the end, but there was no lack of pretty end skirting with brilliant interference."

Michigan's lineup against Western Reserve was Senter and Palmer (left end), Villa (left tackle), James H. Hooper (left guard), Bert Carr (center), Henninger (right guard), Yont (right tackle), George Greenleaf (right end), James Baird (quarterback), William Franlin Holmes and Richards (left halfback), Ferbert (right halfback), and Bloomingston (fullback).

=== Game 4: Lake Forest/Rush Medical ===
Lake Forest/Rush Medical at Michigan

Team	1	2	Total
Lake Forest/Rush Medical	0	0	0
• Michigan	22	18	40

- Date: October 26
- Location: Regents Field, Ann Arbor, MI

On October 26, 1895, Michigan defeated a combined team from Lake Forest University and Rush Medical College, both located in Chicago, by a score of 40 to 0. Because the two institutions were separate from each other, the combined group had insufficient practice to perfect its team work. The game was played at Regents Field in Ann Arbor.

The Lake Forest/Rush team fumbled the opening kickoff. After a couple of plays from scrimmage, left guard James Hooper made "a brilliant run" for Michigan's first touchdown, and fullback John A. Bloomingston kicked goal to give Michigan a 6-0 lead. Left tackle Frank Villa scored Michigan's second touchdown from which goal was missed, and Michigan led, 10-0. Right tackle Frederick W. Henninger scored Michigan's third touchdown, and Bloomingston kicked goal. Villa scored the fourth touchdown, and goal was kicked to give Michigan a 22-0 lead at halftime.

In the second half, Villa scored Michigan's fifth touchdown, and Bloomingston kicked goal to give Michigan a 28-0 lead. Henninger followed a short time later with Michigan's sixth touchdown, and Bloomingston again kicked goal. Michigan led, 34-0. Villa scored Michigan's seventh and final touchdown, and goal was kicked to extend the lead to 40-0.

Michigan's lineup against the Lake Forest/Rush team was Henry M. Senter (left end), Villa (left tackle), Hooper (left guard), Bert Carr (center), John McLain Johnson (right guard), Henninger (right tackle), George Greenleaf (right end), J. De Forest Richards (quarterback), Gustave Ferbert (left halfback), William Franklin Holmes (right halfback), and Bloomingston (fullback).

=== Game 5: Oberlin ===
Oberlin at Michigan

Team	1	2	Total
Oberlin	0	0	0
• Michigan	18	24	42

- Date: November 2
- Location: Regents Field, Ann Arbor, MI
- Game attendance: 800
- Referee: Williams (Detroit)

On November 2, 1895, Michigan defeated Oberlin, 42–0, before 800 spectators at Regents Field in Ann Arbor. The game was played in 25-minute halves. Through its first five games, Michigan had won all five games and outscored opponents, 222 to 0.

A Chicago newspaper's account of the game reported: "Michigan was crippled by the absence of Baird, Senter and Hall, but the play showed improvement over last week. Bloomingston and Ferbert were the star ground gainers." Michigan's seven touchdowns were scored by left halfback Gustave Ferbert, fullback John A. Bloomingston, left tackle Frank Villa, right tackle Frederick W. Henninger, left end Thad Farnum, quarterback Bill Morley, and substitute right halfback Emmett Shields. Bloomingston succeeded in kicking all seven goals after touchdown.

Michigan's line-up for the game was George Greenleaf (right end), Jesse Yont and Henninger (right tackle), Henninger and John Wombacher (right guard), Bert Carr and Denby (center), James Hooper (left guard), Villa (left tackle), Farnum (left end), Morley (quarterback), John W. Hollister and Shields (right halfback), Ferbert (left halfback), and Bloomingston (fullback).

=== Game 6: at Harvard ===
Michigan at Harvard

Team	1	2	Total
Michigan	0	0	0
• Harvard	0	4	4

- Date: November 9
- Location: Soldier's Field, Boston
- Game attendance: 6,000
- Referee: L. M. Garfield

Michigan traveled east to face Harvard on November 9, 1895. Harvard was one of the elite teams in the early days of college football, winning three national championships in the 1890s, and the match between great squads from the east and west was widely anticipated. Before game, The World of New York wrote:

"The football team of the University of Michigan, reputed to be the strongest eleven in the West, is now quartered at Auburndale awaiting tomorrow's game with Harvard on Soldier's Field. Nineteen men have come East on the team. Their line is very evenly balanced, and Bob Wrenn has written to Cambridge that the Michigan quarter-back is the best in the business. They have a long string of victories to their credit this fall, and Harvard will have to play football to score. There is absolutely no way of judging the relative merits of the teams, so the veil of doubt will add to the interest of the game."

The game was played at Soldier's Field in Boston as a "drizzling rain fell throughout the game" on a field that was wet, muddy and slippery. Despite the inclement weather, 6,000 spectators attended the game. The Michigan team was heavier than Harvard's, and Michigan's "interference" was reported to be "clearly superior" to Harvard's. Michigan's offense had success in easily making holes in Harvard's line, but lost the ball repeatedly through off-side penalties. With the game played in the rain, both teams played a kicking game, punting the ball back and forth to gain advantage in field position. The punting game favored Harvard, as "an exchange of punts nearly always resulted in a loss of ground to Michigan." The first half ended with no scoring. In the second half, Harvard blocked two Michigan punts and scored the game's only touchdown on a blocked punt. The score came when Harvard kicked to Michigan's 18-yard line, and Bloomingston immediately attempted to punt the ball back to Harvard. Norton Shaw of Harvard blocked the punt, and the ball was driven behind the goal line where a Harvard player fell on the ball for a touchdown. Harvard failed to convert its goal after touchdown resulting in the score of 4 to 0.

A press account of the game praised Michigan's efforts, noting that "they played a strong, fast game but weakened in the second half." The report continued: "The Michigan team deserves great credit for their work and the dash and spirit of their play. Both sides played straight foot ball, resorting very little to trick plays of any kind." Another newspaper praised the performance of the Michigan team as follows:

"[T]he wearers of the Crimson have not had such a battle before in years. The boys from Michigan simply covered themselves in glory by their splendid work. The play throughout was clean football, devoid of all roughness, and they early on earned the good will and applause of the crowd by their fairness and ever-apparent desire to keep from making it a slugging game."

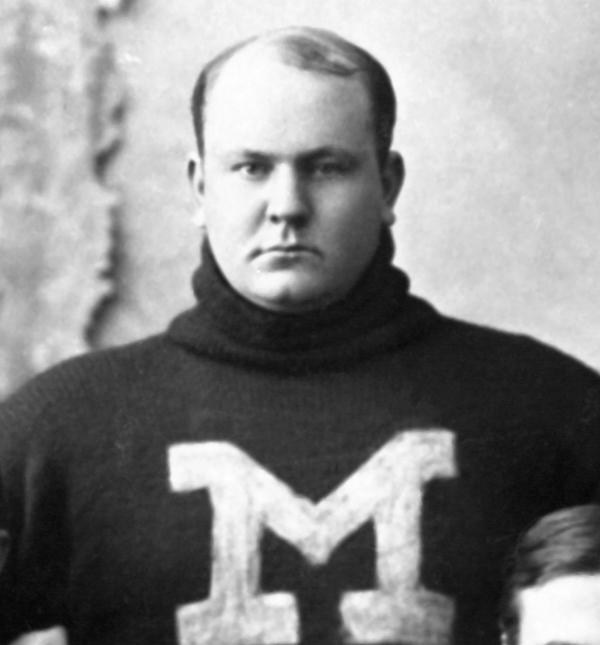
Center Edwin Denby from Detroit later served as Secretary of the Navy.

After the season had ended, Edwin Denby, a Michigan player who later became U.S. Secretary of the Navy, wrote an account of the season in the university yearbook, The Palladium. With respect to the Harvard game, Denby noted that the Michigan football team had traveled to "the distant and holy places of the East" and proved to the Eastern press "that we were farmers, miners, cutthroats, thugs and garroters, and to the reasonable people of the country that the men who came out of the West knew one or two games besides mumblepeg and marbles." Denby continued that the loss to Harvard was "a virtual victory" and asserted that those best qualified to judge were of the opinion that, "given equal conditions," Michigan would have won:

"We had traveled twenty-four hours by rail and rested less than two days before going on the field, we had changed drinking water and diet, we played before some thousands of Harvard sympathizers (though they displayed an impartial appreciation of the good plays of either side, and acted throughout in a thoroughly gentlemanly manner) and finally we played in the rain and on wet and slippery ground, conditions entirely new to us. And so they won, and, even as to that, there were not wanting whispers that without a fortuitous accident – however, post-mortems are always distasteful. Let us accept the fact that we were beaten, and record our intention of turning the tables next year. It is poor policy to belittle a successful antagonist. Better exalt him for the supreme skill he displayed in winning from such a foe, and so honor yourself."

The game was played in 25-minute halves, and Michigan's lineup was Senter (left end), Villa (left tackle), Hooper (left guard), Carr (center), Hall (right guard), Henninger (right tackle), Greenleaf (right end), Baird (quarterback), Gustave Ferbert and Holmes (right halfback), John W. Hollister (left halfback), and John A. Bloomingston (fullback).

=== Game 7: Purdue ===
After the loss to Harvard, Michigan faced Purdue at home in Ann Arbor. Michigan won a close game by a score of 12 to 10. Michigan scored two touchdowns (one each by Gustave Ferbert and Frederick W. Henninger), and John A. Bloomingston converted on both goals after touchdown. Purdue was the only team other than Harvard to score on the 1895 Michigan team. Both teams scored two touchdowns, and the margin of victory came on a missed goal after touchdown by Purdue. In light of Michigan's dominance in its earlier games against Western teams, a larger margin of victory had been expected, leading one newspaper to suggest a two-point win was a cause for "mourning" in Ann Arbor:

"There is mourning in the Michigan camp tonight over the downfall of the football team, for such it seems, when they managed to win from Purdue today, 12 to 10. It had been expected that the game would be fairly close, as the Purdue eleven is strong, and Michigan has shown a great falling off this week in consequence of her trip to Boston and hard game with Harvard. Then, too, three men were missed from the team – Carr at center, Baird at quarter, and Villa at tackle. The defense was thought to be strong enough to shut out Purdue, however, but it was not in evidence, and the offensive work was ragged and dispirited."

In his review of the season in The Palladium, Edwin Denby wrote that the closeness of the Purdue game could be explained by the fact that many of the regulars had been battered in the Harvard game and were replaced by substitutes in the Purdue game." However, Denby gave credit to Purdue as "the best we met in the West." Denby also opined that the last five minutes of the Purdue game "were worth most of the other games of the season put together." He described the line-plunging of Giovanni Villa against Purdue as follows: "It was exhilerating [sic] to note how when Villa took the ball and plunged through the Purdue line as the beautiful lady in the circus jumps through paper hoops, the rest of the Michigan men slouched down the field, crushing and driving everything before them by sheer muscle and determination."

The game was played in halves of 30 and 25 minutes, and Michigan's lineup was Greenleaf (right end), Henninger (right tackle), Hall (right guard), Edwin Denby (center), Hooper (left guard), Yont (left tackle), Senter (left end), Holmes (quarterback), John W. Hollister (right halfback), Gustave Ferbert (left halfback), and John A. Bloomingston (fullback).

=== Game 8: Minnesota ===
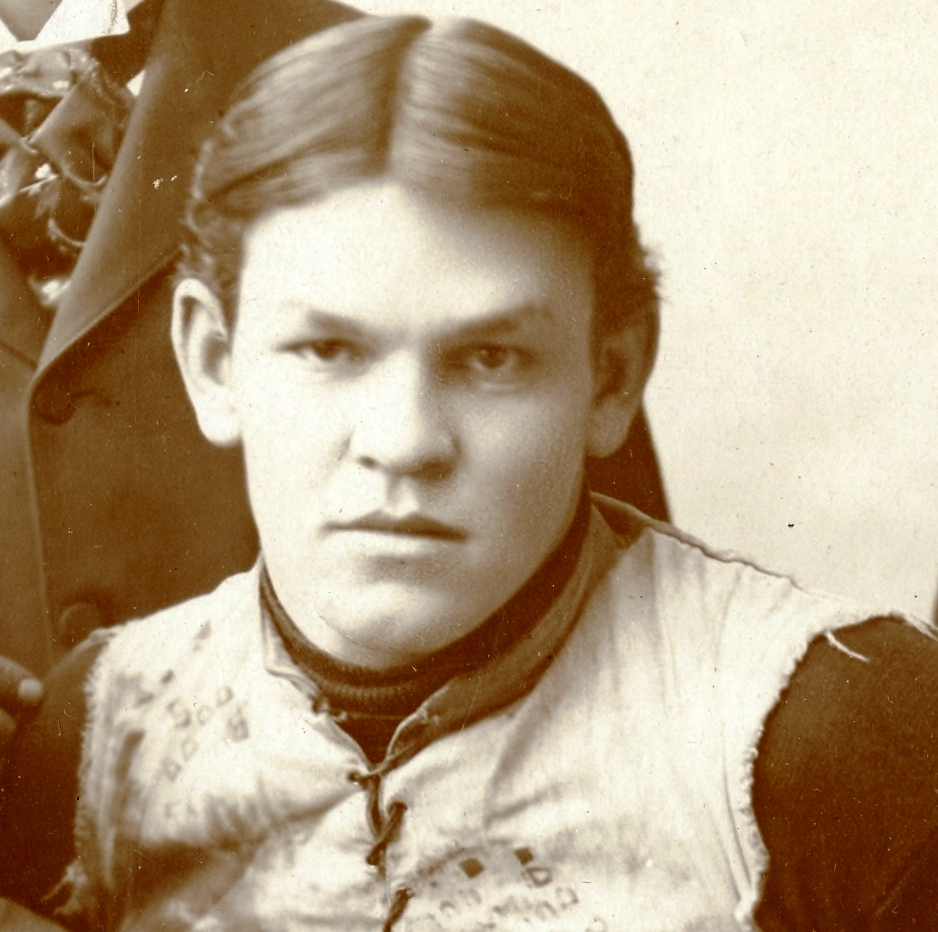
Quarterback James Baird later built the Lincoln Memorial.

Michigan faced the University of Minnesota on November 23, in a game played at the baseball park in Detroit. Michigan easily won the game by a score of 20 to 0. The playing field was soft and slippery from snow and rain, and "the wet ball caused a good deal of fumbling, especially on the part of the Minnesota team." One account described the playing surface as "a field of mud several inches deep. Minnesota was "practically on the defense throughout the game," and "only twice were her runners able to get through Michigan's line for substantial gains." The report of the game published in the Daily Inter Ocean from Chicago described a dominating performance by the Wolverines:

"The men from the far Northwest were clearly outclassed at every point, but played a plucky game. At times their defense was strong and then partly weak, Senter and Ferbert getting through several times for long fifty-yard runs. ... The Michigan men played savagely during the first half ... For Michigan the particulars were Senter, Ferbert, Bloomingston and Henninger, though the entire team played excellently and was very strong in interference."

Halfback Gustave Ferbert scored two touchdowns for Michigan, and Hall and Farnum added one each. Bloomingston kicked a goal from touchdown; another goal was also kicked but the name of the player was not specified.

Michigan's lineup in the game was Farnham (right end), Frederick W. Henninger (right tackle), Hall (right guard), Edwin Denby (center), Hooper (left guard), Villa (left tackle), Senter and Greenleaf (left end), Richards and Morley (quarterback), Ferbert (left halfback), John W. Hollister and Holmes (right halfback), and John A. Bloomingston (fullback).

=== Game 9: Chicago ===
The final game of the season matched Michigan against Amos Alonzo Stagg's Chicago Maroons. The game was played on Thanksgiving Day in front of more than 6,000 spectators at Marshall Field in Chicago. Due to the inclement weather, the field had to be "carefully scraped and sawdust scattered over the thin layer of ice" before the game began. Michigan's first scoring drive came in the first half when the right halfback, John W. Hollister, took the ball on Chicago's 45-yard line and ran around the right end for a 35-yard gain, a play the press called "a prettily-executed criss cross." Later in the drive, Frederick W. Henninger fumbled the ball which rolled beyond the goal line where it was recovered by Richards for the game's first touchdown. The running of Michigan's fullback John A. Bloomingston, a Chicago native, was reportedly the high point of the game. A Chicago newspaper described one run by Bloomingston as follows:

"Chicago could not gain, and Neel was forced to punt again. Bloomingston received the ball, and, dodging the tacklers, who sought to bring him to the ground, ran back the entire length of the kick. It was a splendid performance, and no small part of the applause the hero received came from Chicago throats."

The final score was 12–0. Michigan's dominance over Stagg's team led one Chicago newspaper to write the following:

"The Michigan team is the finest set of football players Ann Arbor has ever sent out and completely out-classes any team in the West. ... The Michigan play both individually and in team work was magnificent. Even the worried Chicago substitutes and coaches on the side line could not refrain from an occasional word of admiration at the perfect defense of the visitors. The very appearance of the team was enough to bring applause from the most prejudiced Chicago supporter. ... [T]he local team appeared like school-boys before them. It seemed almost wonderful that these giants could be kept from sweeping down the field and scoring as they willed."

Michigan's lineup against Chicago was Senter (left end), Villa (left tackle), Hooper (left guard), Carr (center), Hall (right guard), Henninger (right tackle), Farnum (right end), Richards (quarterback), Ferbert (left halfback), Hollister (right halfback), and Bloomingston (fullback).

Following the game The World of New York wrote that the Michigan players had "clinched their claim to the Western championship."

=== All-Western selections ===
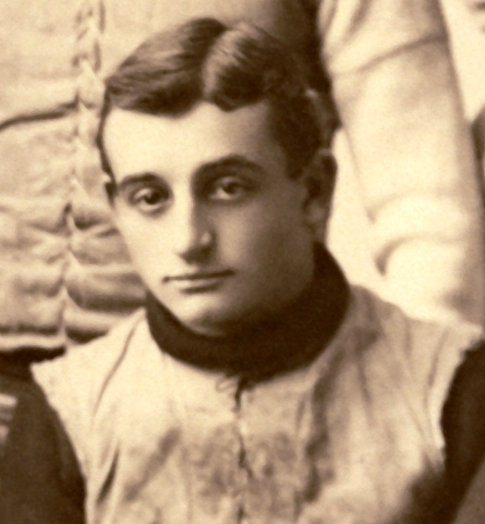
Michigan All-Western halfback Gustave Ferbert

Following the 1895 season, a number of Michigan players were honored on All-Western teams. One Chicago newspaper, the Daily Inter Ocean, included six Wolverines on its All-Western team. The Michigan players recognized by the Daily Inter Ocean were Gustave Ferbert (first-team halfback), John Bloomington (first-team fullback), James Hooper (first-team guard), Giovanni Villa (first-team tackle), Henry Senter (first-team end), and James Baird (substitute quarterback). In announcing its All-Western selections, the Daily Inter Ocean made the following comments about the Michigan players selected:

- "Villa is the best tackle of this season, as he was of last. His immense strength and weight, added to his cleverness and agility, make him a powerful man."
- "Senter is one of the best ends in the country, East or West. He is the one Western player who approaches Yale form and a man of whom Michigan is deservedly proud. Possessed of unbounded daring, he plays like a demon and runs and tackles in a manner astonishing in a player of so short experience."
- "Ferbert is a cool, hard-working player, strong and sure on the defensive ... Ferbert is the most valuable man because of his defensive ability."
- "Every one in the West, with the possible exception of the Wisconsin men, unites in the selection of Bloomington as full back. Those who saw the sensational runs made in the game with Chicago last Thanksgiving day can possibly have no other opinion. Sure at goals, a strong punter, and a wonderful runner, he has but few rivals."

== Personnel ==
=== Varsity letter winners ===
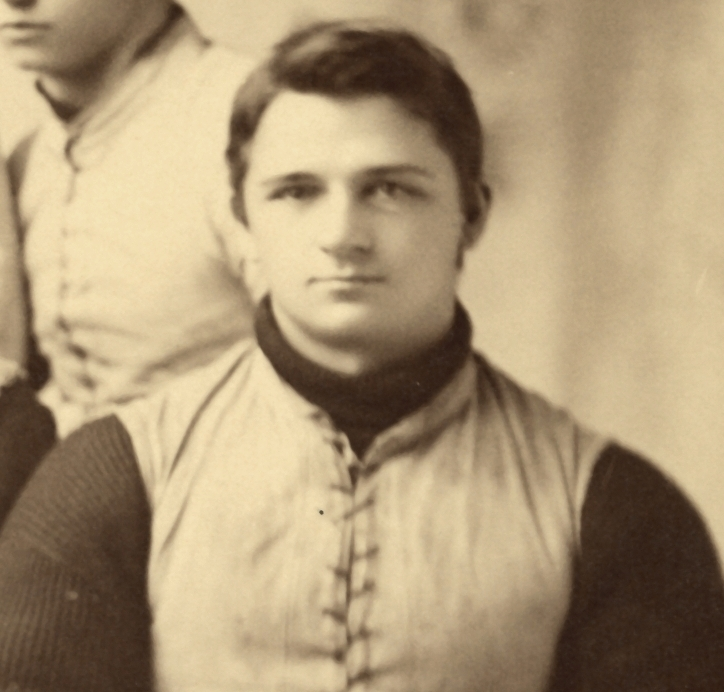
Tackle Frank Villa from Walla Walla, Washington

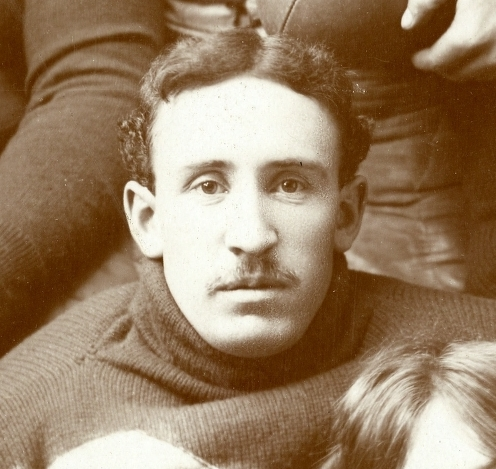
End Henry Senter from Houghton, Michigan

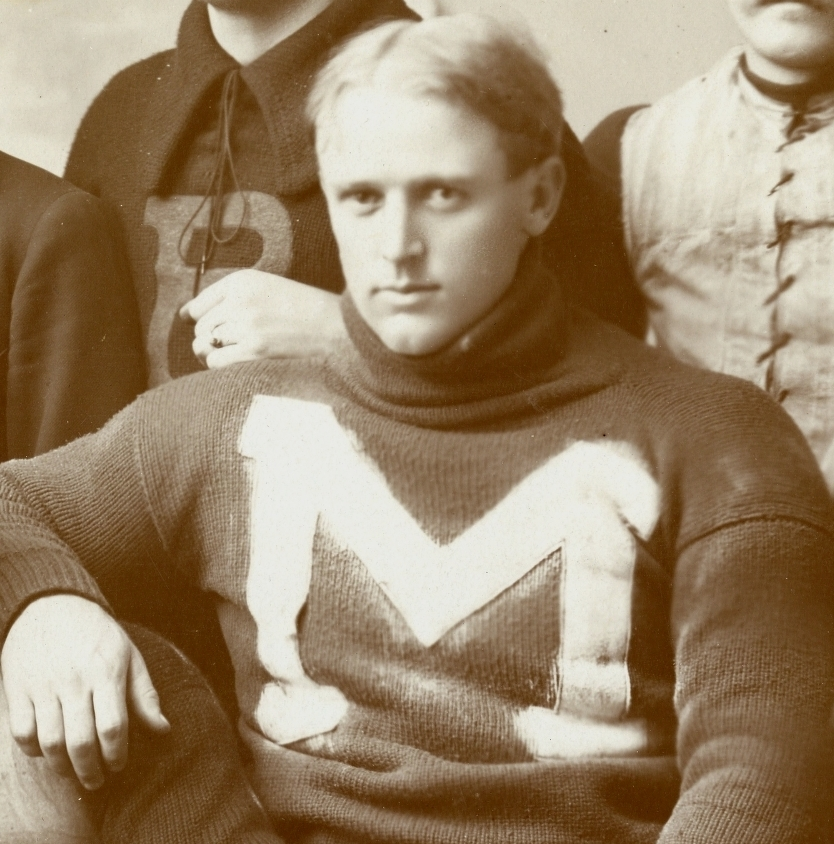
Center Bert Carr from Cedar Spring, Michigan

The following 18 players earned varsity letters for their participation on the 1895 Michigan football team. Players who started at least five of Michigan's nine games are displayed in bold.

- James Baird, Chicago (age 21) – started 3 games at quarterback
- **John A. Bloomingston**, Chicago (age 22) – started 9 games at fullback
- **Bert Carr**, Cedar Springs, Michigan (age 24) – started 7 games at center
- Edwin Denby, Detroit (age 24) – started 2 games at center
- Thomas Drumheller, Walla Walla, Washington –
- Thaddeus Loomis Farnham, Rosford, Ohio (age 21) – started 1 game at right end
- **Gustave Ferbert**, Cleveland (age 21) – started 7 games at left halfback, 2 games at right halfback
- Raynor Freund, Reserve, Montana –
- **George Greenleaf**, Brazil, Indiana (age 21) – started 5 games at right end, 3 games at left end
- Forrest M. Hall, Jackson Centre, Ohio (age 23) – started 4 games at right guard
- **Frederick W. Henninger**, Barberton, Ohio (age 22) – started 5 games at right tackle, 4 games at right guard
- **John W. Hollister**, Beloit, Wisconsin (age 23) – started 5 games at right halfback, 1 game at left halfback, 1 game at right end
- William Franklin Holmes, Somerville, Massachusetts (age 22) – started 2 games at quarterback, 1 game at left halfback, 1 game at right halfback
- **James H. Hooper**, Butte, Montana (age 23) – started 7 games at left guard
- Bill Morley, Socorro Datil, New Mexico (age 20) – started 1 game at quarterback
- **J. De Forest Richards**, Douglas, Wyoming (age 21) – started 3 games at quarterback, 1 game at left halfback, 1 game at right halfback
- **Henry M. Senter**, Houghton, Michigan (age 23) – started 6 games at left end
- **Frank Villa**, Walla Walla, Washington (age 22) – started 8 games at left tackle

=== Other players ===
- Norwood Ayers, Omaha, Nebraska
- Fred L. Baker, Hillsdale, Michigan
- Philip D. Bourland, Peoria, Illinois
- William Gordon Bryant, Mt. Clemens, Michigan
- Edward Paul DePont, Ann Arbor, Michigan
- Hugh W. Dicken, Romeo, Michigan
- Ignatius Duffy, Ann Arbor, Michigan
- Herbert Rogers Gates, Chicago
- Edwin H. Gordon, Tyner, North Dakota
- Loomis Hutchinson, Ceresco, Michigan – started 1 game at right end
- John McLain Johnson, Hopkinton, Iowa – started 1 game at left guard, 1 game at right guard
- Samuel James Johnson, Hopkinton, Iowa
- Clare LeRoy, Ann Arbor, Michigan
- William Dexter McKenzie, Ann Arbor, Michigan
- Oscar Reiff Myers, New Enterprise, Pennsylvania
- James M. Raikes, Burlington, Iowa – started 1 game at left guard
- Emmett Claude Shields, Howell, Michigan
- Joseph Roy Showalter
- Charles T. Tryon, Bay City, Michigan
- Harry Scott Vernon, Chicago
- John David Wombacher, Joliet, Illinois
- **Jesse Grant Yont**, Brock, Nebraska – started 4 games at right tackle, 1 game at left tackle

=== Scoring leaders ===
Player	Touchdowns	Goals from TD	Field goals	Total
John A. Bloomingston	6	30	0	84
Frank Villa	8	0	0	32
Gustave Ferbert	6	0	0	24
Jesse Yont	6	0	0	24
John W. Hollister	5	0	0	20
Frederick W. Henninger	4	0	0	16
J. De Forest Richards	3	0	0	12
Thad Farnum	2	0	0	8
Henry M. Senter	2	0	0	8
Herbert Gates	1	0	0	4
Forrest M. Hall	1	0	0	4
James Hooper	1	0	0	4
Bill Morley	1	0	0	4
Emmett Shields	1	0	0	4
Player not identified	0	9	0	18
Total	47	39	0	266

=== Coaching and training staff ===
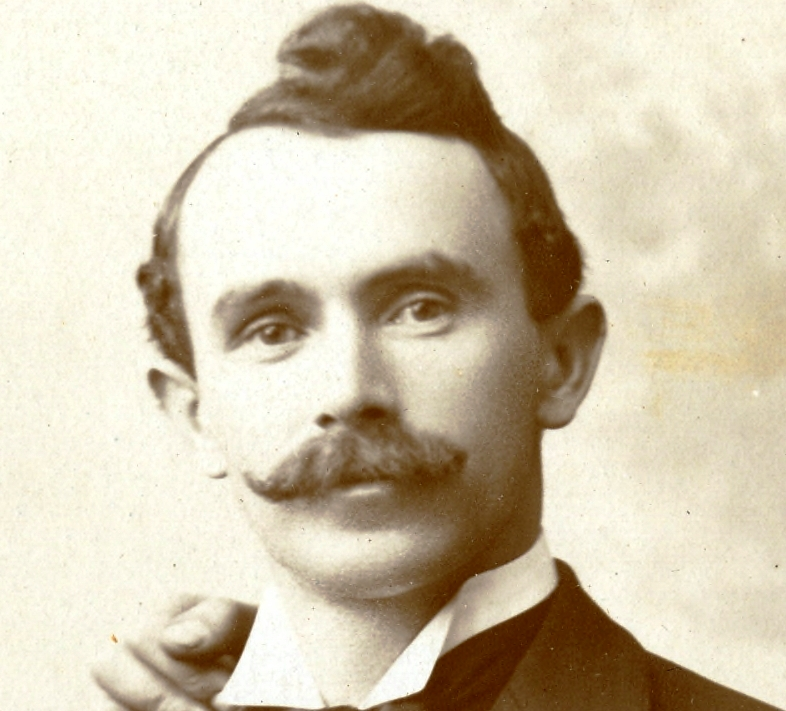
Trainer Keene Fitzpatrick is considered "one of the pioneers of intercollegiate sport."

The coaching and training staff of the 1895 Michigan Wolverines consisted of four men. Former Princeton football star William McCauley was the coach. Keene Fitzpatrick, considered "one of the pioneers of intercollegiate sport," was the trainer (and also the school's track coach). Charles A. Baird, who was named the university's first athletic director three years later, was the team manager. Frederick Henninger was the team captain. A newspaper profile of Henninger in November 1895 said:

"The University of Michigan team, captained by F. W. Henninger, is one of the strongest football elevens in the west. Henninger is a veteran of last year's eleven, is 5 feet 10 inches tall aud weighs 180 pounds. He is an excellent field general, plays right guard and is said to be the strongest man on the team."

In his review of the 1895 season, Edwin Denby described the contributions made by the team's four leaders:

"If to any one man above another credit is due for this result, McCauley should receive it. Not only his splendid coaching, but his quiet, gentlemanly, kindly manner, his forbearance, and his abstention from the use of language too strong for the public prints, all had their good effect upon the team. And certainly he would have found it hard to get such excellent support from any three other men as he got from Fitzpatrick, Henninger and Baird. They have all won the high regard of the entire university and the sincere liking of those who have come in personal contact with them."
