= Frederick W. Henninger =

American football player, coach, and businessman (1873–1919)

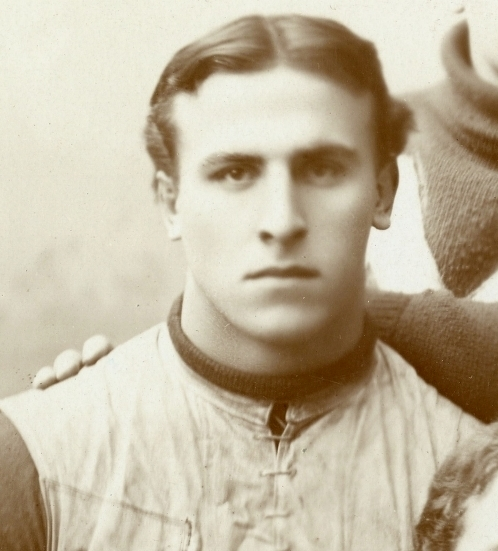
- Frederick Henninger, 1894

Biographical details
- Born: February 2, 1873; Cleveland, Ohio, U.S.
- Died: May 30, 1919 (aged 46); Detroit, Michigan, U.S.

Playing career
- 1893–1896: Michigan
- Positions: Tackle, guard

Coaching career (HC unless noted)
- 1897–1899: Michigan (assistant)

Frederick William "Pa" Henninger (February 2, 1873 – May 30, 1919) was an American businessman and football player and coach. He played football for the University of Michigan from 1893 to 1896 and was the captain of the 1895 team that outscored their opponents by a combined score of 266 to 14. After receiving his degree, he was an assistant football coach at Michigan from 1897 to 1899 and 1902. He worked as an engineer for the Detroit United Railway and later had a successful career as a manufacturer in Detroit.

== Biography ==
=== Early years ===
Henninger was born in Cleveland and educated in that city's public schools. He attended Ann Arbor High School for his college preparatory studies.

=== Michigan ===
He enrolled at the University of Michigan where he played football from 1893 to 1896. He was captain of the 1895 Michigan team that compiled an 8–1 record, won seven of their games by shutouts, and outscored their opponents by a combined score of 266 to 14. The sole loss of the 1895 season was a 4–0 setback against the Harvard Crimson, then one of the three great football powers. Michigan finished the season with a 12–0 win over Western rival, Amos Alonzo Stagg's Chicago Maroons. A newspaper profile of Henninger in November 1895 said:

"The University of Michigan team, captained by F. W. Henninger, is one of the strongest football elevens in the west. Henninger is a veteran of last year's eleven, is 5 feet 10 inches tall and weighs 180 pounds. He is an excellent field general, plays right guard and is said to be the strongest man on the team."

In his review of the 1895 season, Edwin Denby praised the team's four leaders, head coach William McCauley, trainer Keene Fitzpatrick, manager Charles A. Baird, and Henninger as the team captain, for their "excellent support" of the team: "They have all won the high regard of the entire university and the sincere liking of those who have come in personal contact with them." Henninger was also a director of the University of Michigan athletic association for three years while he was a student.

Henninger studied electrical engineering at Michigan and received his bachelor's degree in 1897. After graduating, Henninger served as an assistant football coach at Michigan from 1897 to 1899, including the 1898 Michigan team that won the school's first Western Conference championship. He also returned in 1902 as an assistant coach under Fielding H. Yost.

In November 1902, The Michigan Alumnus chose an All-Michigan Team consisting of the greatest football players ever to play for the Michigan Wolverines football team. Henninger was selected as the right tackle on the All-Michigan team. In selecting Henninger, the author wrote:

"His method of charging into the line, either to break interference or to open up holes for the man with the ball was characteristic, and to his ability in the latter direction was due much of the success of his old team mate, Villa, a most persistent ground-gainer. For years 'Pa' Henninger was a mainstay of the Michigan team, a familiar figure on every western gridiron, and a member of every All-Michigan team by the process of natural selection."

Henninger was also selected by the student magazine, The Inlander, for its all-time "All-Michigan Team" in November 1904.

=== Business career ===
After graduating from Michigan, Henninger worked for the Detroit United Railway for six years from 1897 to 1903. He was in charge of the Motor Testing Department from 1897 to 1898, was made chief draftsman in 1898, and Superintendent of Car Inspectors from 1899 to 1903. He retired from the railway in 1903 to go into business for himself. At the time of his retirement from the railway, the 45 motor inspectors of the Detroit United Railway gave "a trolley party" in his honor. The party rode the trolley to Birmingham, Michigan, where "supper was partaken at the Colonial Hotel." The inspectors presented Henninger with a solid diamond ring in a heavy gold setting with the Masonic emblem enameled on one side and the Elk's emblem on the other side.

After leaving the Detroit Urban Railway, Henninger formed his own company which he called the Bellevue Manufacturing Company in 1903 with offices at 343 Bellevue Avenue in Detroit. He was also an inventor of a machine called a wire insulating machine. He also served as the treasurer and eventually president of the Sheet Steel Stamping Company, vice president of Riverbank Corporation and treasurer of Seminoe Mining Company. At the time of the 1910 United States census, he was living in Detroit, and his occupation was listed as the manager of a machine factory.

In July 1914, Henninger applied for a U.S. passport. He indicated in the application that he was a resident of Detroit engaged in the occupation of a manufacturer. In September 1914, he sailed from Liverpool, England, to New York on the SS Celtic.

In a Draft Registration Card completed in September 1918, Heninger indicated that he was a self-employed mechanical engineer working and living at 34 Westminster in Detroit.

=== Family and death ===
In January 1912, Henninger married Lorena Ketchum of Detroit. He was a Democrat, Protestant, Mason, Shriner and Elk. He enjoyed fishing, hunting and other outdoor sports. Henninger died in May 1919 at age 46. He was buried at Detroit's Woodlawn Cemetery.
