= William McCauley (American football) =

American football player and coach (1872–1898)

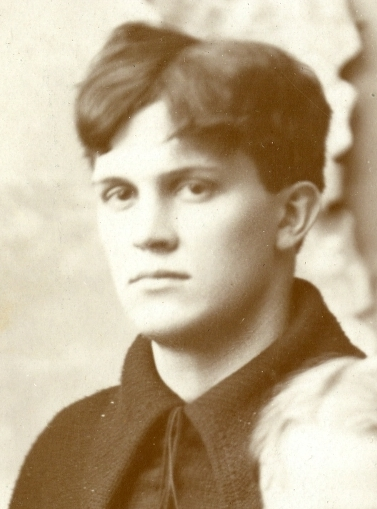

Biographical details
- Born: July 6, 1872
- Died: March 23, 1898 (aged 25); Rochester, New York, U.S.

Playing career
- 1892–1893: Princeton
- Positions: Tackle, end, halfback

Coaching career (HC unless noted)
- 1894–1895: Michigan
- 1896: Michigan (assistant)

Head coaching record
- Overall: 17–2–1

William Lloyd "Jerry" McCauley (July 6, 1872 – March 23, 1898) was an American college football player and coach. He was the third head coach of the University of Michigan football team.

McCauley listed his home town as Stanley, New York. He attended preparatory school at Geneva Prep. He later attended Princeton University, where he played for the Princeton Tigers football teams in 1892 and 1893 as a tackle, left end and halfback. He was six feet tall and 175 pounds while playing football at Princeton.

McCauley later enrolled at the University of Michigan as a medical student. While at Michigan, he served as the head coach of the 1894 and 1895 Michigan Wolverines football teams. He compiled a coaching record of 17–2–1, and his .875 winning percentage remains the second highest in the program's history. McCauley was a medical student at Michigan while he served as the coach of the football team. In his two seasons as head coach, the Wolverines lost only two games, once to Cornell and once to Harvard. In 1894, the Wolverines defeated Cornell, 12–4, the first time that a "western school" had beaten one of the established eastern football powers. He also served as an assistant coach for the 1896 Michigan football team.

After leaving Michigan, McCauely was a student in the medical department of the University of Pennsylvania. In March 1898, he died of heart disease at his home in Rochester, New York.

== Head coaching record ==
Year	Team	Overall	Conference	Standing	Bowl/playoffs
Michigan Wolverines (Independent) (1894–1895)
1894	Michigan	9–1–1			
1895	Michigan	8–1			
Michigan:		17–2–1			
Total:		17–2–1			
