= Mark G. Henninger =

American philosopher

Mark Henninger
- Born: August 27, 1948 (age 78)

Education
- Education: University of California-Los Angeles (MA, PhD), Fordham University (MA)

Philosophical work
- Era: 21st-century philosophy
- Region: Western philosophy
- Institutions: Georgetown University
- Main interests: medieval philosophy

Mark G. Henninger (born August 27, 1948) is an American philosopher and Jesuit priest and Professor Emeritus of Philosophy at Georgetown University. He is known for his works on medieval philosophy.

== Books ==
- Fabrizio Amerini, Aquinas on the Beginning and End of Human Life, Mark Henninger (tr.), Harvard University Press, 2013, ISBN 9780674072473.
- Henninger, Mark. “Henry of Harclay and the Univocal Concept of Being.” Medieval Studies, Vol. 68 (2006): pp. 205–237.
- Henninger, Mark G. “Henry of Harclay.” A Companion to Philosophy in the Middle Ages. Ed. Jorge J. E. Gracia and Timothy B. Noone. Malden: Blackwell, 2003.
- Henninger, Mark G. 'Harclay, Henry (c.1270–1317)', Oxford Dictionary of National Biography, Oxford University Press, 2004 (accessed 13 November 2007).
- Henry of Harclay. Ordinary Questions, І-XIV. Edited by Mark G Henninger and translated by Raymond Edwards & Mark G. Henninger. Oxford, OUP/British Academy, 2008 (Auctores Britannici Medii Aevi XVIII), 738 pp.
- Henry of Harclay. Ordinary Questions, XV-XXIX. Edited by Mark G Henninger and translated by Raymond Edwards & Mark G. Henninger. Oxford, OUP/British Academy, 2008 (Auctores Britannici Medii Aevi XVIII), 492 pp.
