= 1893 Ohio State Buckeyes football team =

American college football season

1893 Ohio State Buckeyes football
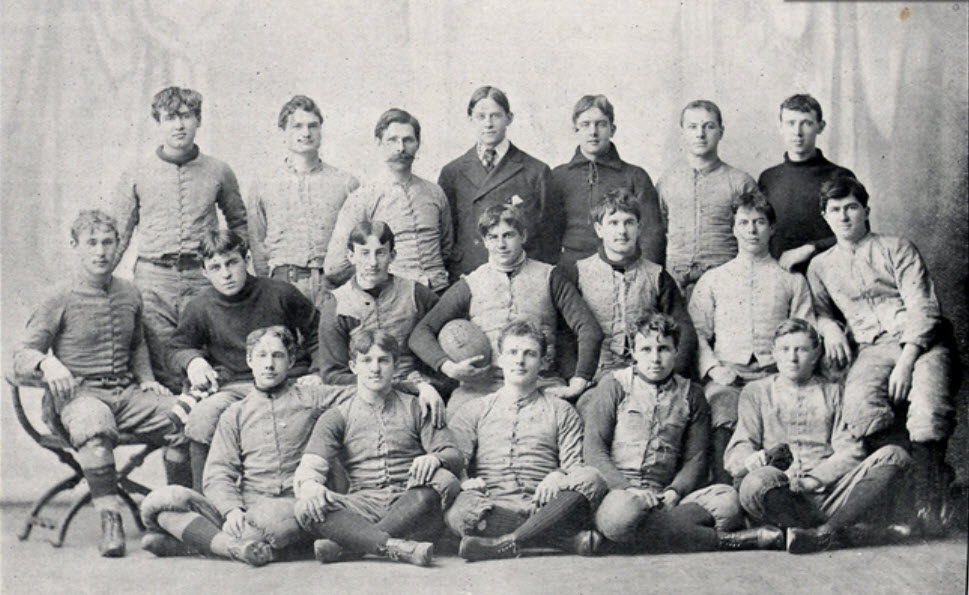
- Conference: Independent
- Record: 4–5
- Head coach: Jack Ryder (2nd season)
- Captain: A. P. Gillen
- Home stadium: Recreation Park

1893 Midwestern college football independents records
	Conf.			Overall
Team	W	L	T	W		L		T
Case		–		4	–	0	–	0
Miami (OH)		–		3	–	0	–	0
Baker		–		5	–	0	–	1
Oberlin		–		6	–	1	–	0
Hillsdale		–		4	–	1	–	0
Notre Dame		–		4	–	1	–	0
Buchtel		–		5	–	2	–	0
Butler		–		4	–	2	–	0
Michigan State Normal		–		4	–	2	–	0
Chicago		–		6	–	4	–	2
Beloit		–		4	–	3	–	0
Illinois		–		3	–	2	–	3
Lake Forest		–		3	–	2	–	3
Doane		–		2	–	2	–	0
Heidelberg		–		2	–	2	–	0
Kansas State Normal		–		1	–	1	–	0
Wabash		–		3	–	3	–	0
Washburn		–		1	–	1	–	1
Washington University		–		1	–	1	–	0
Ohio State		–		4	–	5	–	0
Wittenberg		–		2	–	3	–	0
Mount Union		–		1	–	2	–	0
Drake		–		0	–	2	–	1
Baldwin–Wallace		–		0	–	1	–	0
College of Emporia		–		0	–	1	–	0
Ohio Wesleyan		–		0	–	1	–	0
Kalamazoo		–		0	–	2	–	0
Iowa Agricultural		–		0	–	3	–	0
Cincinnati		–		0	–	6	–	0

The 1893 Ohio State Buckeyes football team represented Ohio State University in the 1893 college football season. They played all their home games at Recreation Park and were coached by Jack Ryder. The Buckeyes finished the season with a 4–5 record.

== Schedule ==
Date	Opponent	Site	Result	Source
September 30	at Otterbein	Westerville, OH	L 16–22	
October 14	Wittenberg	Recreation Park; Columbus, OH	W 36–10	
October 21	Oberlin	Recreation Park; Columbus, OH	L 10–38	
October 28	at Kenyon	Gambier, OH	L 6–42	
November 4	Western Reserve	Recreation Park; Columbus, OH	L 16–30	
November 11	Buchtel	Recreation Park; Columbus, OH	W 32–18	
November 18	Cincinnati	Recreation Park; Columbus, OH	W 38–0	
November 25	Marietta	Recreation Park; Columbus, OH	W 40–8	
November 30	Kenyon	Recreation Park; Columbus, OH	L 8–10	
