= 1893 Oberlin Yeomen football team =

American college football season

1893 Oberlin Yeomen football
- Conference: Independent
- Record: 6–1
- Head coach: Everett B. Camp (1st season)

1893 Midwestern college football independents records
	Conf.			Overall
Team	W	L	T	W		L		T
Case		–		4	–	0	–	0
Miami (OH)		–		3	–	0	–	0
Baker		–		5	–	0	–	1
Oberlin		–		6	–	1	–	0
Hillsdale		–		4	–	1	–	0
Notre Dame		–		4	–	1	–	0
Buchtel		–		5	–	2	–	0
Butler		–		4	–	2	–	0
Michigan State Normal		–		4	–	2	–	0
Chicago		–		6	–	4	–	2
Beloit		–		4	–	3	–	0
Illinois		–		3	–	2	–	3
Lake Forest		–		3	–	2	–	3
Doane		–		2	–	2	–	0
Heidelberg		–		2	–	2	–	0
Kansas State Normal		–		1	–	1	–	0
Wabash		–		3	–	3	–	0
Washburn		–		1	–	1	–	1
Washington University		–		1	–	1	–	0
Ohio State		–		4	–	5	–	0
Wittenberg		–		2	–	3	–	0
Mount Union		–		1	–	2	–	0
Drake		–		0	–	2	–	1
Baldwin–Wallace		–		0	–	1	–	0
College of Emporia		–		0	–	1	–	0
Ohio Wesleyan		–		0	–	1	–	0
Kalamazoo		–		0	–	2	–	0
Iowa Agricultural		–		0	–	3	–	0
Cincinnati		–		0	–	6	–	0

The 1893 Oberlin Yeomen football team represented Oberlin College during the 1893 college football season. In its first and only season under head coach Everett B. Camp, the team compiled a record of 6–1, including victories over Ohio State, Chicago, and Illinois. The 1892 and 1893 teams combined for a 13-game winning streak that was broken on November 18, 1893, in a loss to the Case School of Applied Science.

== Schedule ==
Date	Opponent	Site	Result	Attendance	Source
October 7	Kenyon	Oberlin, OH	W 6–0		
October 21	at Ohio State	Recreation Park; Columbus, OH	W 38–10		
October 23	at Kenyon	Gambier, OH	W 30–8		
October 28	Western Reserve	Oberlin, OH	W 40–4		
November 4	at Chicago	Marshall Field; Chicago, IL	W 33–12	800	
November 6	at Illinois	Illinois Field; Champaign, IL	W 34–24		
November 18	Case	Oberlin, OH	L 8–22	2,000	
