= 1893 Buchtel football team =

American college football season

1893 Buchtel football
- Conference: Independent
- Record: 5–2
- Head coach: John Heisman (1st season)
- Captain: Carlos Webster

1893 Midwestern college football independents records
	Conf.			Overall
Team	W	L	T	W		L		T
Case		–		4	–	0	–	0
Miami (OH)		–		3	–	0	–	0
Baker		–		5	–	0	–	1
Oberlin		–		6	–	1	–	0
Hillsdale		–		4	–	1	–	0
Notre Dame		–		4	–	1	–	0
Buchtel		–		5	–	2	–	0
Butler		–		4	–	2	–	0
Michigan State Normal		–		4	–	2	–	0
Chicago		–		6	–	4	–	2
Beloit		–		4	–	3	–	0
Illinois		–		3	–	2	–	3
Lake Forest		–		3	–	2	–	3
Doane		–		2	–	2	–	0
Heidelberg		–		2	–	2	–	0
Kansas State Normal		–		1	–	1	–	0
Wabash		–		3	–	3	–	0
Washburn		–		1	–	1	–	1
Washington University		–		1	–	1	–	0
Ohio State		–		4	–	5	–	0
Wittenberg		–		2	–	3	–	0
Mount Union		–		1	–	2	–	0
Drake		–		0	–	2	–	1
Baldwin–Wallace		–		0	–	1	–	0
College of Emporia		–		0	–	1	–	0
Ohio Wesleyan		–		0	–	1	–	0
Kalamazoo		–		0	–	2	–	0
Iowa Agricultural		–		0	–	3	–	0
Cincinnati		–		0	–	6	–	0

The 1893 Buchtel football team represented Buchtel College in the 1893 college football season. The team was led by first-year head coach John Heisman.

== Schedule ==
Date	Opponent	Site	Result	Attendance	Source
October 23	Hiram	Akron, OH	W 54–2		
October 28	Case	Akron, OH	L 0–36		
October 31	Massillon A.C.	Akron, OH	W 52–4		
	Western Reserve Academy	Akron, OH	W 66–4		
November 11	at Ohio State	Recreation Park; Columbus, OH	L 13–32		
November 18	Ohio Wesleyan	Akron, OH	W 46–4		
November 30	Mount Union	Akron, OH	W 40–0	1,000	
