= 1893 Cincinnati football team =

American college football season

1893 Cincinnati football
- Conference: Independent
- Record: 0–6
- Head coach: None
- Captains: Dan Laurence; Russell Reeder
- Home stadium: East End Grounds, League Park

1893 Midwestern college football independents records
	Conf.			Overall
Team	W	L	T	W		L		T
Case		–		4	–	0	–	0
Miami (OH)		–		3	–	0	–	0
Baker		–		5	–	0	–	1
Oberlin		–		6	–	1	–	0
Hillsdale		–		4	–	1	–	0
Notre Dame		–		4	–	1	–	0
Buchtel		–		5	–	2	–	0
Butler		–		4	–	2	–	0
Michigan State Normal		–		4	–	2	–	0
Chicago		–		6	–	4	–	2
Beloit		–		4	–	3	–	0
Illinois		–		3	–	2	–	3
Lake Forest		–		3	–	2	–	3
Doane		–		2	–	2	–	0
Heidelberg		–		2	–	2	–	0
Kansas State Normal		–		1	–	1	–	0
Wabash		–		3	–	3	–	0
Washburn		–		1	–	1	–	1
Washington University		–		1	–	1	–	0
Ohio State		–		4	–	5	–	0
Wittenberg		–		2	–	3	–	0
Mount Union		–		1	–	2	–	0
Drake		–		0	–	2	–	1
Baldwin–Wallace		–		0	–	1	–	0
College of Emporia		–		0	–	1	–	0
Ohio Wesleyan		–		0	–	1	–	0
Kalamazoo		–		0	–	2	–	0
Iowa Agricultural		–		0	–	3	–	0
Cincinnati		–		0	–	6	–	0

The 1893 Cincinnati football team was an American football team that represented the University of Cincinnati as an independent during the 1893 college football season. The team compiled a 0–6 record. Dan Laurence and Russell Reeder were the team captains. The team had no head coach and played home games at East End Grounds and League Park in Cincinnati.

== Schedule ==
Date	Time	Opponent	Site	Result	Attendance	Source
October 7		at Miami (OH)	Oxford, OH (rivalry)	L 6–24		
October 14		at Centre	Danville, KY	L 0–18		
October 28	3:45 p.m.	at Chicago	Marshall Field; Chicago, IL	L 0–26		
November 4		Miami (OH)	East End Grounds; Cincinnati, OH	L 0–6	300	
November 18		at Ohio State	Recreation Park; Columbus, OH	L 0–32		
November 30	2:30 p.m.	Cincinnati YMCA	League Park; Cincinnati, OH	L 6–22		
