= 1893 Baker Methodists football team =

American college football season

1893 Baker Methodists football
- Conference: Independent
- Record: 5–0–1
- Head coach: Charles Thomas (1st season)

1893 Midwestern college football independents records
	Conf.			Overall
Team	W	L	T	W		L		T
Case		–		4	–	0	–	0
Miami (OH)		–		3	–	0	–	0
Baker		–		5	–	0	–	1
Oberlin		–		6	–	1	–	0
Hillsdale		–		4	–	1	–	0
Notre Dame		–		4	–	1	–	0
Buchtel		–		5	–	2	–	0
Butler		–		4	–	2	–	0
Michigan State Normal		–		4	–	2	–	0
Chicago		–		6	–	4	–	2
Beloit		–		4	–	3	–	0
Illinois		–		3	–	2	–	3
Lake Forest		–		3	–	2	–	3
Doane		–		2	–	2	–	0
Heidelberg		–		2	–	2	–	0
Kansas State Normal		–		1	–	1	–	0
Wabash		–		3	–	3	–	0
Washburn		–		1	–	1	–	1
Washington University		–		1	–	1	–	0
Ohio State		–		4	–	5	–	0
Wittenberg		–		2	–	3	–	0
Mount Union		–		1	–	2	–	0
Drake		–		0	–	2	–	1
Baldwin–Wallace		–		0	–	1	–	0
College of Emporia		–		0	–	1	–	0
Ohio Wesleyan		–		0	–	1	–	0
Kalamazoo		–		0	–	2	–	0
Iowa Agricultural		–		0	–	3	–	0
Cincinnati		–		0	–	6	–	0

The 1893 Baker Methodists football team represented the Baker University as an independent during the 1893 college football season. Led by Charles Thomas in his first and only season as head coach, the Methodists compiled a record of 5–0–1. Baker was the "Champion Football Team of the Great West"

== Schedule ==
Date	Time	Opponent	Site	Result	Attendance	Source
October 14		vs. Missouri	Exposition Park; Kansas City, MO	W 28–0		
October 21	2:37 p.m.	at Kansas	McCook Field; Lawrence, KS	W 14–12		
October 28		at Nebraska	Lincoln Park; Lincoln, NE	T 10–10		
October 30	3:00 p.m.	at Doane	Crete grounds; Crete, NE	W 10–0		
November 30		at Denver Athletic Club	Denver, CO	W 32–0		
December 2	3:00 p.m.	at Kansas Wesleyan	Oak Dale Park; Salina, KS	W 44–0	150–200	
All times are in Central time

=== Second team ===
Date	Opponent	Site	Result	Source
November 13	at Ottawa	Ottawa, KS	W 30–6	
November 25	Ottawa	Athletic Field; Baldwin City, KS	W 14–10	
November 30	at Ottawa	Forest Park; Ottawa, KS	L 0–14	
