= 1893 Notre Dame football team =

American college football season

1893 Notre Dame football
- Conference: Independent
- Record: 4–1
- Head coach: None
- Captain: Frank Keough
- Home stadium: Brownson Hall field

1893 Midwestern college football independents records
	Conf.			Overall
Team	W	L	T	W		L		T
Case		–		4	–	0	–	0
Miami (OH)		–		3	–	0	–	0
Baker		–		5	–	0	–	1
Oberlin		–		6	–	1	–	0
Hillsdale		–		4	–	1	–	0
Notre Dame		–		4	–	1	–	0
Buchtel		–		5	–	2	–	0
Butler		–		4	–	2	–	0
Michigan State Normal		–		4	–	2	–	0
Chicago		–		6	–	4	–	2
Beloit		–		4	–	3	–	0
Illinois		–		3	–	2	–	3
Lake Forest		–		3	–	2	–	3
Doane		–		2	–	2	–	0
Heidelberg		–		2	–	2	–	0
Kansas State Normal		–		1	–	1	–	0
Wabash		–		3	–	3	–	0
Washburn		–		1	–	1	–	1
Washington University		–		1	–	1	–	0
Ohio State		–		4	–	5	–	0
Wittenberg		–		2	–	3	–	0
Mount Union		–		1	–	2	–	0
Drake		–		0	–	2	–	1
Baldwin–Wallace		–		0	–	1	–	0
College of Emporia		–		0	–	1	–	0
Ohio Wesleyan		–		0	–	1	–	0
Kalamazoo		–		0	–	2	–	0
Iowa Agricultural		–		0	–	3	–	0
Cincinnati		–		0	–	6	–	0

The 1893 Notre Dame football team was an American football team that represented the University of Notre Dame in the 1893 college football season. The team had no coach, compiled a 4–1 record, and outscored its opponents by a combined total of 92 to 24.

== Schedule ==
Date	Time	Opponent	Site	Result	Source
October 26	3:20 p.m.	Kalamazoo	Brownson Hall field; Notre Dame, IN	W 34–0	
November 11		Albion	Brownson Hall field; Notre Dame, IN	W 8–6	
November 23		De La Salle Institute	Brownson Hall field; Notre Dame, IN	W 28–0	
November 30		Hillsdale	Brownson Hall field; Notre Dame, IN	W 22–10	
January 1, 1894		vs. Chicago	Tattersall's Pavilion; Chicago, IL	L 0–8	
