= 1893 Iowa Agricultural Cardinals football team =

American college football season

1893 Iowa Agricultural Cardinals football
- Conference: Independent
- Record: 0–3
- Head coach: W. P. Finney (1st season)
- Captain: Ed Mellinger

1893 Midwestern college football independents records
	Conf.			Overall
Team	W	L	T	W		L		T
Case		–		4	–	0	–	0
Miami (OH)		–		3	–	0	–	0
Baker		–		5	–	0	–	1
Oberlin		–		6	–	1	–	0
Hillsdale		–		4	–	1	–	0
Notre Dame		–		4	–	1	–	0
Buchtel		–		5	–	2	–	0
Butler		–		4	–	2	–	0
Michigan State Normal		–		4	–	2	–	0
Chicago		–		6	–	4	–	2
Beloit		–		4	–	3	–	0
Illinois		–		3	–	2	–	3
Lake Forest		–		3	–	2	–	3
Doane		–		2	–	2	–	0
Heidelberg		–		2	–	2	–	0
Kansas State Normal		–		1	–	1	–	0
Wabash		–		3	–	3	–	0
Washburn		–		1	–	1	–	1
Washington University		–		1	–	1	–	0
Ohio State		–		4	–	5	–	0
Wittenberg		–		2	–	3	–	0
Mount Union		–		1	–	2	–	0
Drake		–		0	–	2	–	1
Baldwin–Wallace		–		0	–	1	–	0
College of Emporia		–		0	–	1	–	0
Ohio Wesleyan		–		0	–	1	–	0
Kalamazoo		–		0	–	2	–	0
Iowa Agricultural		–		0	–	3	–	0
Cincinnati		–		0	–	6	–	0

The 1893 Iowa Agricultural Cardinals football team represented Iowa Agricultural College (later renamed Iowa State University) as an independent during the 1893 college football season. The 1893 Cyclones compiled a 0–3 record, losing twice to Grinnell and once to Cornell. They were outscored by a combined total of 62 to 14. W. P. Finney was the head coach, and Ed Mellinger was the team captain.

Between 1892 and 1913, the football team played on a field that later became the site of the university's Parks Library.

== Schedule ==
Date	Time	Opponent	Site	Result	Source
October 14		at Grinnell	Grinnell, IA	L 6–42	
November 4		Cornell (IA)	Ames, IA	L 6–14	
	3:00 p.m.	Grinnell	Ames, IA	L 2–6	
