= 1893 Illinois Fighting Illini football team =

American college football season

1893 Illinois Fighting Illini football
- Conference: Independent
- Record: 3–2–3
- Head coach: Edward K. Hall (2nd season)
- Captain: George H. Atherton
- Home stadium: Illinois Field

1893 Midwestern college football independents records
	Conf.			Overall
Team	W	L	T	W		L		T
Case		–		4	–	0	–	0
Miami (OH)		–		3	–	0	–	0
Baker		–		5	–	0	–	1
Oberlin		–		6	–	1	–	0
Hillsdale		–		4	–	1	–	0
Notre Dame		–		4	–	1	–	0
Buchtel		–		5	–	2	–	0
Butler		–		4	–	2	–	0
Michigan State Normal		–		4	–	2	–	0
Chicago		–		6	–	4	–	2
Beloit		–		4	–	3	–	0
Illinois		–		3	–	2	–	3
Lake Forest		–		3	–	2	–	3
Doane		–		2	–	2	–	0
Heidelberg		–		2	–	2	–	0
Kansas State Normal		–		1	–	1	–	0
Wabash		–		3	–	3	–	0
Washburn		–		1	–	1	–	1
Washington University		–		1	–	1	–	0
Ohio State		–		4	–	5	–	0
Wittenberg		–		2	–	3	–	0
Mount Union		–		1	–	2	–	0
Drake		–		0	–	2	–	1
Baldwin–Wallace		–		0	–	1	–	0
College of Emporia		–		0	–	1	–	0
Ohio Wesleyan		–		0	–	1	–	0
Kalamazoo		–		0	–	2	–	0
Iowa Agricultural		–		0	–	3	–	0
Cincinnati		–		0	–	6	–	0

The 1893 Illinois Fighting Illini football team was an American football team that represented the University of Illinois during the 1893 college football season. In their second season under head coach Edward K. Hall, the Illini compiled a 3–2–3 record. End George H. Atherton was the team captain.

== Schedule ==
Date	Opponent	Site	Result	Source
September 30	Wabash	Illinois Field; Champaign, IL	W 60–6	
October 7	at DePauw	Blackstock Stadium; Greencastle, IN	W 14–4	
October 21	at Northwestern	Northwestern Field; Evanston, IL (rivalry)	T 0–0	
October 28	Chicago Athletic Association	Illinois Field; Champaign, IL	L 4–10	
November 6	Oberlin	Illinois Field; Champaign, IL	L 24–34	
November 11	at Pastime Athletic Club	Sportsman's Park; St. Louis, MO	W 18–16	
November 25	at Purdue	Stuart Field; West Lafayette, IN (rivalry)	T 26–26	
November 30	Lake Forest	Illinois Field; Champaign, IL	T 10–10	

== Roster ==
Atherton, George H. LE (captain); Baum, Harry W. LHB; Cooper, Paul H. RE; Fouts, L.H. LG; Gaut, Robert E. C; McCormick, Olin RG; Parker, Walter A. RT; Pfeffer, James E. RT; Pixley, Arthur H. LT; Quade, John C. RE; Root, George H. LHB; Sweney, Don LG; Tackett, William C. RHB; Woody, Frederick W. QB; Wright, Royal FB/LHB	Substitutes: Branch, James M. RT; Chester, Guy J. LHB; Fletcher, Marcus S. LE; Fulton, James B. LHB; Hart, Ralph W. FB; Smolt, A.E. RG; Tilton, Harry W. QB; Weedman, Fred J. LHB

Source: University of Illinois
