= 1893 Chicago Maroons football team =

American college football season

1893 Chicago Maroons football
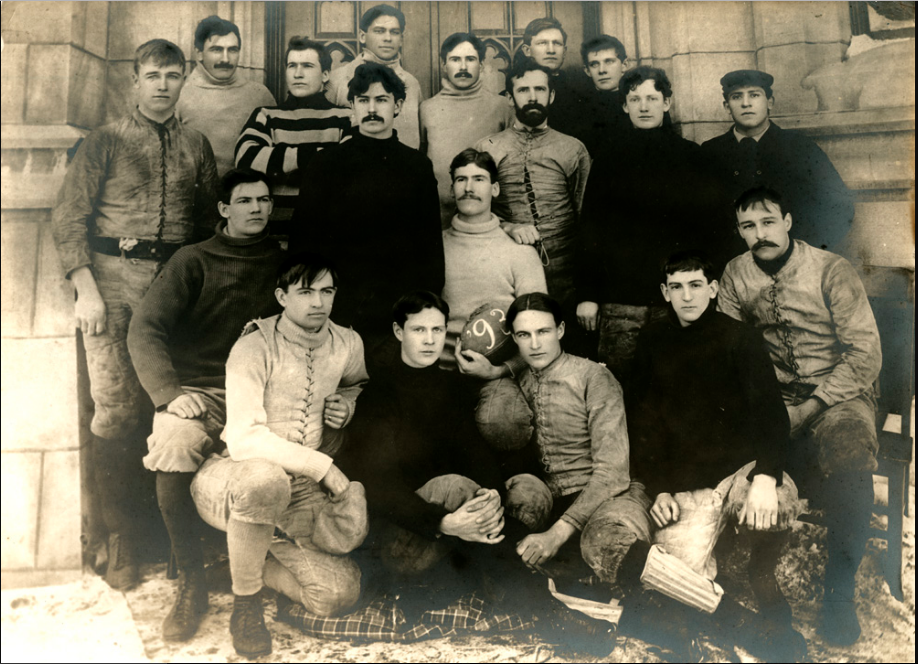
- Conference: Independent
- Record: 6–4–2
- Head coach: Amos Alonzo Stagg (2nd season)
- Captain: Andy Wyant
- Home stadium: Marshall Field

1893 Midwestern college football independents records
	Conf.			Overall
Team	W	L	T	W		L		T
Case		–		4	–	0	–	0
Miami (OH)		–		3	–	0	–	0
Baker		–		5	–	0	–	1
Oberlin		–		6	–	1	–	0
Hillsdale		–		4	–	1	–	0
Notre Dame		–		4	–	1	–	0
Buchtel		–		5	–	2	–	0
Butler		–		4	–	2	–	0
Michigan State Normal		–		4	–	2	–	0
Chicago		–		6	–	4	–	2
Beloit		–		4	–	3	–	0
Illinois		–		3	–	2	–	3
Lake Forest		–		3	–	2	–	3
Doane		–		2	–	2	–	0
Heidelberg		–		2	–	2	–	0
Kansas State Normal		–		1	–	1	–	0
Wabash		–		3	–	3	–	0
Washburn		–		1	–	1	–	1
Washington University		–		1	–	1	–	0
Ohio State		–		4	–	5	–	0
Wittenberg		–		2	–	3	–	0
Mount Union		–		1	–	2	–	0
Drake		–		0	–	2	–	1
Baldwin–Wallace		–		0	–	1	–	0
College of Emporia		–		0	–	1	–	0
Ohio Wesleyan		–		0	–	1	–	0
Kalamazoo		–		0	–	2	–	0
Iowa Agricultural		–		0	–	3	–	0
Cincinnati		–		0	–	6	–	0

The 1893 Chicago Maroons football team was an American football team that represented the University of Chicago during the 1893 college football season. In their second season under head coach Amos Alonzo Stagg, the Maroons compiled a 6–4–2 record and were outscored by their opponents by a combined total of 143 to 142.

== Schedule ==
Date	Time	Opponent	Site	Result	Attendance	Source
October 14		Lake Forest	Marshall Field; Chicago, IL	L 0–10		
October 18		Northwestern	Marshall Field; Chicago, IL	W 12–6		
October 21		Michigan	Marshall Field; Chicago, IL (rivalry)	W 10–6		
October 25		at Purdue	Stuart Field; West Lafayette, IN (rivalry)	L 10–20		
October 28	3:45 p.m.	Cincinnati	Marshall Field; Chicago, IL	W 26–0		
November 4		Oberlin	Marshall Field; Chicago, IL	L 12–33	800	
November 8		at Northwestern	Northwestern Field; Evanston, IL	T 6–6		
November 11		Armour	Marshall Field; Chicago, IL	W 18–6		
November 18		Lake Forest	Marshall Field; Chicago, IL	T 14–14		
November 30		Michigan	Marshall Field; Chicago, IL	L 10–28	3,500	
December 16		vs. Northwestern	Tattersall's Pavilion; Chicago, IL	W 22–14		
January 1		vs. Notre Dame	Tattersall's Pavilion; Chicago, IL	W 8–0		

== Roster ==
Player	Position
Andrew R. E. Wyant (captain)	right tackle
Charles William Allen	right tackle, left end, halfback
Charles King Bliss	Tackle, Kicker
Henry Thurston Chace	right end
Henry Gordon Gale	fullback
Frank Earle Hering	quarterback
George Nelson Knapp	right guard
John Lemay	left end
Horace G. Lozier
Carr Baker Neel	fullback
Frederick Day Nichols	right halfback
William John Rapp	fullback
George Cushing Sikes
Joseph Edward Raycroft	quarterback
Warren Rufus Smith	guard
Henry Dallas Speer
Adam Martin Wyant	quarterback, center

- Head coach: Amos Alonzo Stagg (2nd year at Chicago)
