= 1893 Case football team =

American college football season

1893 Case football
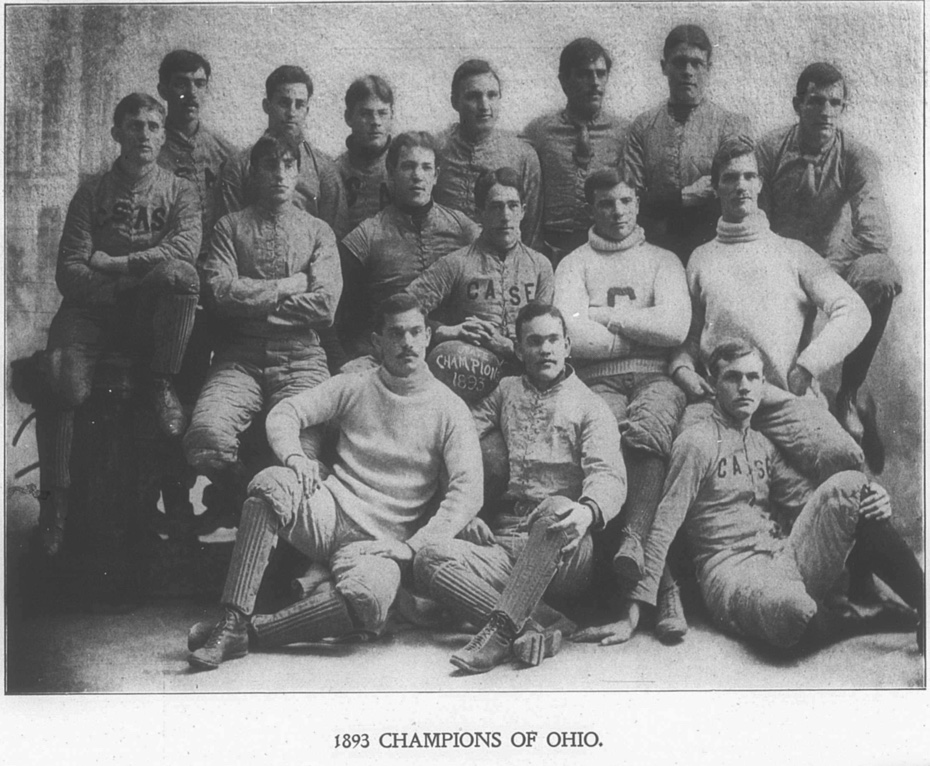
- Conference: Independent
- Record: 4–0
- Head coach: None
- Captain: Alva C. Smith

1893 Midwestern college football independents records
	Conf.			Overall
Team	W	L	T	W		L		T
Case		–		4	–	0	–	0
Miami (OH)		–		3	–	0	–	0
Baker		–		5	–	0	–	1
Oberlin		–		6	–	1	–	0
Hillsdale		–		4	–	1	–	0
Notre Dame		–		4	–	1	–	0
Buchtel		–		5	–	2	–	0
Butler		–		4	–	2	–	0
Michigan State Normal		–		4	–	2	–	0
Chicago		–		6	–	4	–	2
Beloit		–		4	–	3	–	0
Illinois		–		3	–	2	–	3
Lake Forest		–		3	–	2	–	3
Doane		–		2	–	2	–	0
Heidelberg		–		2	–	2	–	0
Kansas State Normal		–		1	–	1	–	0
Wabash		–		3	–	3	–	0
Washburn		–		1	–	1	–	1
Washington University		–		1	–	1	–	0
Ohio State		–		4	–	5	–	0
Wittenberg		–		2	–	3	–	0
Mount Union		–		1	–	2	–	0
Drake		–		0	–	2	–	1
Baldwin–Wallace		–		0	–	1	–	0
College of Emporia		–		0	–	1	–	0
Ohio Wesleyan		–		0	–	1	–	0
Kalamazoo		–		0	–	2	–	0
Iowa Agricultural		–		0	–	3	–	0
Cincinnati		–		0	–	6	–	0

The 1893 Case football team was an American football team that represented the Case School of Applied Science in Cleveland, Ohio, now a part of Case Western Reserve University. Playing as an independent during the 1893 college football season, the team compiled a 4–0 record, outscoring opponents by a total of 120 to 8.

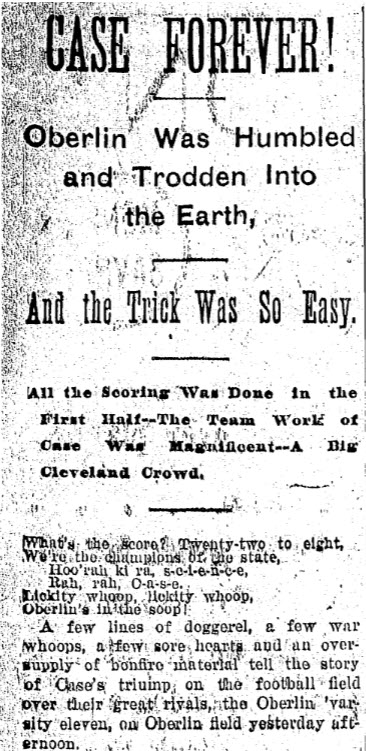
Plain Dealer sports section on November 19, 1893

Case snapped a 13-game win streak of Oberlin, whose win streak dated back to their undefeated 1892 season. Notably, Case defeated Coach John Heisman of Buchtel, handing him his first ever career coaching loss, who ironically was the coach of the undefeated 1892 Oberlin team the prior season.

Charley Gleason was the star halfback, who also previously played on the 1889 Georgetown football team. Captain Alva C. Smith played quarterback.

== Schedule ==
Date	Opponent	Site	Result	Attendance	Source
October 21	Western Reserve	Cleveland, OH	W 34–0		
October 28	at Buchtel	Akron, OH	W 36–0		
November 11	at Cleveland Athletic Club	C.A.C Field; Cleveland, OH	W 28–0		
November 18	at Oberlin	Oberlin, OH	W 22–8	2,000	
