= 1895 Ohio State Buckeyes football team =

American college football season

1895 Ohio State Buckeyes football
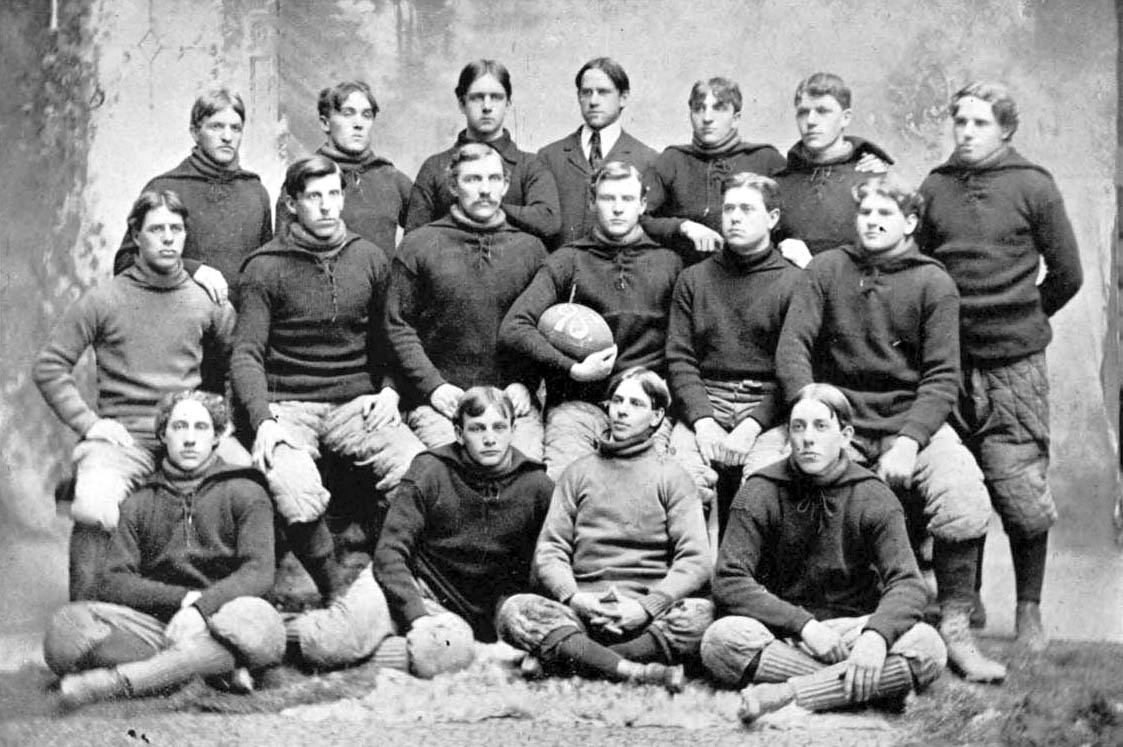
- Conference: Independent
- Record: 4–4–2
- Head coach: Jack Ryder (4th season)
- Captain: Renick William Dunlap
- Home stadium: Recreation Park

1895 Midwestern college football independents records
	Conf.			Overall
Team	W	L	T	W		L		T
Miami (OH)		–		3	–	0	–	0
Carthage		–		2	–	0	–	0
Washington University		–		2	–	0	–	0
Michigan		–		8	–	1	–	0
Chicago		–		10	–	3	–	0
Wittenberg		–		5	–	2	–	0
Minnesota		–		7	–	3	–	0
Wisconsin		–		5	–	2	–	1
Wabash		–		6	–	3	–	0
Baldwin–Wallace		–		3	–	1	–	0
Notre Dame		–		3	–	1	–	0
Illinois		–		4	–	2	–	1
Buchtel		–		3	–	2	–	0
College of Emporia		–		3	–	2	–	0
Doane		–		3	–	2	–	0
Chicago P&S		–		3	–	2	–	1
Purdue		–		4	–	3	–	0
Indiana		–		4	–	3	–	1
Northwestern		–		6	–	5	–	0
Butler		–		2	–	2	–	0
Cincinnati		–		3	–	3	–	0
Kalamazoo		–		1	–	1	–	0
Michigan State Normal		–		3	–	3	–	0
North Dakota Agricultural		–		1	–	1	–	0
North Dakota		–		1	–	1	–	0
Ohio State		–		4	–	4	–	2
Iowa Agricultural		–		3	–	4	–	0
Ohio		–		2	–	3	–	0
Rush-Lake Forest		–		4	–	6	–	0
Ohio Wesleyan		–		2	–	4	–	1
Haskell		–		1	–	2	–	0
Iowa State Normal		–		1	–	2	–	0
Lake Forest		–		1	–	2	–	0
Northwestern Law		–		1	–	2	–	0
Drake		–		1	–	4	–	0

The 1895 Ohio State Buckeyes football team represented Ohio State University in the 1895 college football season. The team was coached by Jack Ryder, who was in his fourth and final year of coaching the Buckeyes. The team captain was Renick W. Dunlap.

== Schedule ==
Date	Time	Opponent	Site	Result	Attendance	Source
October 5		Buchtel	Recreation Park; Columbus, OH	W 14–6		
October 12		at Otterbein	Westerville, OH	L 6–14		
October 19		Oberlin	Recreation Park; Columbus, OH	L 0–12		
October 26		at Denison	Granville, OH	T 4–4		
November 2		Ohio Wesleyan	Recreation Park; Columbus, OH	T 8–8		
November 9		at Cincinnati	League Park; Cincinnati, OH	W 4–0	200	
November 15	3:00 p.m.	at Kentucky State College	Lexington, KY	W 8–6	300	
November 16		at Centre (KY)	Lexington, KY	L 0-18		
November 23		at Marietta	Marietta, OH	L 0-24		
November 28		Kenyon	Recreation Park; Columbus, OH	W 12–10		
