= 1895 Iowa Agricultural Cyclones football team =

American college football season

1895 Iowa Agricultural Cyclones football
- Conference: Independent
- Record: 3–4
- Head coach: Pop Warner (1st season)
- Captain: Ed Mellinger

1895 Midwestern college football independents records
	Conf.			Overall
Team	W	L	T	W		L		T
Miami (OH)		–		3	–	0	–	0
Carthage		–		2	–	0	–	0
Washington University		–		2	–	0	–	0
Michigan		–		8	–	1	–	0
Chicago		–		10	–	3	–	0
Wittenberg		–		5	–	2	–	0
Minnesota		–		7	–	3	–	0
Wisconsin		–		5	–	2	–	1
Wabash		–		6	–	3	–	0
Baldwin–Wallace		–		3	–	1	–	0
Notre Dame		–		3	–	1	–	0
Illinois		–		4	–	2	–	1
Buchtel		–		3	–	2	–	0
College of Emporia		–		3	–	2	–	0
Doane		–		3	–	2	–	0
Chicago P&S		–		3	–	2	–	1
Purdue		–		4	–	3	–	0
Indiana		–		4	–	3	–	1
Northwestern		–		6	–	5	–	0
Butler		–		2	–	2	–	0
Cincinnati		–		3	–	3	–	0
Kalamazoo		–		1	–	1	–	0
Michigan State Normal		–		3	–	3	–	0
North Dakota Agricultural		–		1	–	1	–	0
North Dakota		–		1	–	1	–	0
Ohio State		–		4	–	4	–	2
Iowa Agricultural		–		3	–	4	–	0
Ohio		–		2	–	3	–	0
Rush-Lake Forest		–		4	–	6	–	0
Ohio Wesleyan		–		2	–	4	–	1
Haskell		–		1	–	2	–	0
Iowa State Normal		–		1	–	2	–	0
Lake Forest		–		1	–	2	–	0
Northwestern Law		–		1	–	2	–	0
Drake		–		1	–	4	–	0

The 1895 Iowa Agricultural Cyclones football team represented Iowa Agricultural College (later renamed Iowa State University) as an independent during the 1895 college football season. The Cyclones compiled a 3–4 record and outscored all opponents by a combined total of 82 to 70. Ed Mellinger was the team captain.

While Pop Warner is listed as the team's head coach, The Des Moines Register reported that he only worked with the team before the season started, and "it is believed he only saw the team play once" during the five-year period he was listed as the coach. Ira C. Brownlie, who founded the Iowa Agricultural football program in 1892, later recalled: "In 1895 the great Pop Warner came out to Ames to coach. He would remain with us from July to October 1. . . . He was at Ames for five years that way."

Between 1892 and 1913, the football team played on a field that later became the site of the university's Parks Library.

== Schedule ==
Date	Time	Opponent	Site	Result	Source
September 15	3:00 p.m.	at Butte AC	Butte, MT	L 10–12	
September 26		at Purdue	Stuart Field; West Lafayette, IN	L 0–6 (forfeit)	
September 28		at Northwestern	Evanston, IL	W 36–0	
September 30		at Wisconsin	Randall Field; Madison, WI	L 6–28	
October 12		at Sioux City Athletics	Sioux City, IA	W 6–0	
October 19		at Minnesota	Minneapolis, MN	L 0–24	
October 28		at Iowa	Iowa Field; Iowa City, IA (rivalry)	W 24–0	
All times are in Central time
