= 1895 Chicago Physicians and Surgeons football team =

American collegiate football team

1895 Chicago Physicians and Surgeons football
- Conference: Independent
- Record: 3–2–1
- Head coach: Slightham (1st season)
- Captain: Wynekoop (right halfback)

1895 Midwestern college football independents records
	Conf.			Overall
Team	W	L	T	W		L		T
Miami (OH)		–		3	–	0	–	0
Carthage		–		2	–	0	–	0
Washington University		–		2	–	0	–	0
Michigan		–		8	–	1	–	0
Chicago		–		10	–	3	–	0
Wittenberg		–		5	–	2	–	0
Minnesota		–		7	–	3	–	0
Wisconsin		–		5	–	2	–	1
Wabash		–		6	–	3	–	0
Baldwin–Wallace		–		3	–	1	–	0
Notre Dame		–		3	–	1	–	0
Illinois		–		4	–	2	–	1
Buchtel		–		3	–	2	–	0
College of Emporia		–		3	–	2	–	0
Doane		–		3	–	2	–	0
Chicago P&S		–		3	–	2	–	1
Purdue		–		4	–	3	–	0
Indiana		–		4	–	3	–	1
Northwestern		–		6	–	5	–	0
Butler		–		2	–	2	–	0
Cincinnati		–		3	–	3	–	0
Kalamazoo		–		1	–	1	–	0
Michigan State Normal		–		3	–	3	–	0
North Dakota Agricultural		–		1	–	1	–	0
North Dakota		–		1	–	1	–	0
Ohio State		–		4	–	4	–	2
Iowa Agricultural		–		3	–	4	–	0
Ohio		–		2	–	3	–	0
Rush-Lake Forest		–		4	–	6	–	0
Ohio Wesleyan		–		2	–	4	–	1
Haskell		–		1	–	2	–	0
Iowa State Normal		–		1	–	2	–	0
Lake Forest		–		1	–	2	–	0
Northwestern Law		–		1	–	2	–	0
Drake		–		1	–	4	–	0

The 1895 Chicago Physicians and Surgeons football team was an American football team that represented the University of Illinois College of Medicine in the 1895 college football season. In the football team's first year of existence the Surgeons achieved a 3–2–1 record and outscored their opponents 76 to 58.

== Schedule ==
Date	Time	Opponent	Site	Result	Source
October 30		Irving Athletic Club	Douglas Park; Chicago, IL	W 20–0 or 26–0	
November 2 or 3		Chicago Dental School	Douglas Park; Chicago, IL	W 20–8	
November 9	3:00 P. M.	Hahnemann Medical College	Chicago Athletic Association field; Chicago, IL	T 0–0	
		Illinois Cycling Club		L 0–18	
November 23		at Proviso	Maywood, IL	W 36–0	
November 28		at Notre Dame	Brownson Hall field; Notre Dame, IN	L 0–32	
