= 1895 Minnesota Golden Gophers football team =

American college football season

1895 Minnesota Golden Gophers football
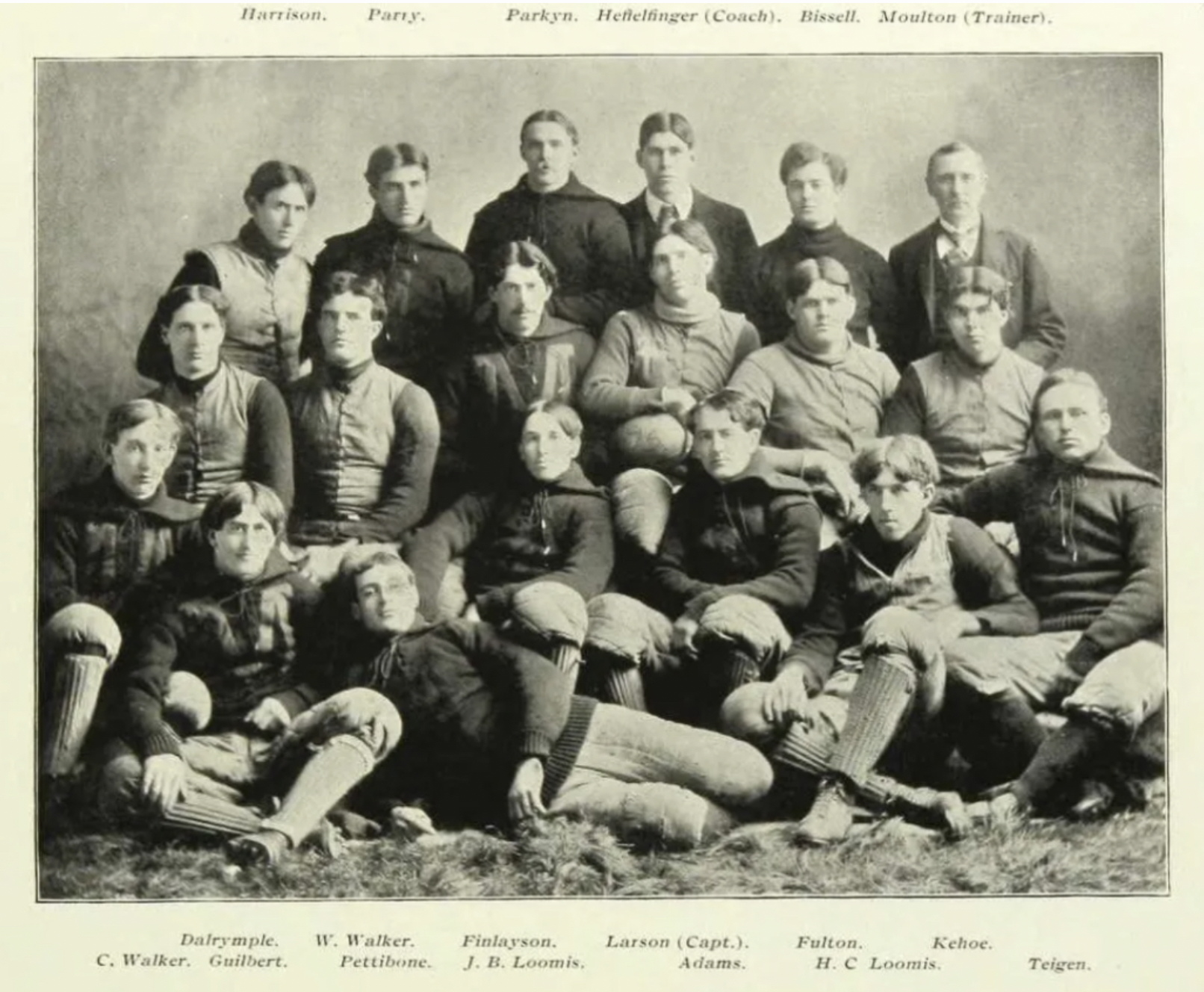
- Conference: Independent
- Record: 7–3
- Head coach: Pudge Heffelfinger (1st season)
- Captain: August T. Larson

1895 Midwestern college football independents records
	Conf.			Overall
Team	W	L	T	W		L		T
Miami (OH)		–		3	–	0	–	0
Carthage		–		2	–	0	–	0
Washington University		–		2	–	0	–	0
Michigan		–		8	–	1	–	0
Chicago		–		10	–	3	–	0
Wittenberg		–		5	–	2	–	0
Minnesota		–		7	–	3	–	0
Wisconsin		–		5	–	2	–	1
Wabash		–		6	–	3	–	0
Baldwin–Wallace		–		3	–	1	–	0
Notre Dame		–		3	–	1	–	0
Illinois		–		4	–	2	–	1
Buchtel		–		3	–	2	–	0
College of Emporia		–		3	–	2	–	0
Doane		–		3	–	2	–	0
Chicago P&S		–		3	–	2	–	1
Purdue		–		4	–	3	–	0
Indiana		–		4	–	3	–	1
Northwestern		–		6	–	5	–	0
Butler		–		2	–	2	–	0
Cincinnati		–		3	–	3	–	0
Kalamazoo		–		1	–	1	–	0
Michigan State Normal		–		3	–	3	–	0
North Dakota Agricultural		–		1	–	1	–	0
North Dakota		–		1	–	1	–	0
Ohio State		–		4	–	4	–	2
Iowa Agricultural		–		3	–	4	–	0
Ohio		–		2	–	3	–	0
Rush-Lake Forest		–		4	–	6	–	0
Ohio Wesleyan		–		2	–	4	–	1
Haskell		–		1	–	2	–	0
Iowa State Normal		–		1	–	2	–	0
Lake Forest		–		1	–	2	–	0
Northwestern Law		–		1	–	2	–	0
Drake		–		1	–	4	–	0

The 1895 Minnesota Golden Gophers football team represented the University of Minnesota as an independent the 1895 college football season. It was the only season under head coach Pudge Heffelfinger.

On January 11, 1895, the Presidents of several schools met in a preliminary meeting and formed a group which would become the Intercollegiate Conference of Faculty Representatives, known today as the Big Ten Conference.

As a result of this emerging conference, this season was Minnesota's last season as an independent. Minnesota won its first ever match with Chicago with a last minute touchdown to win a very close, physical game by a score of 10–6. Financially, the team rebounded from some lean years. They "secured a large subscription from the business men of the city, the attendance at all of the games was good, and at the close of the season there was a large surplus in the treasury."

== Schedule ==
Date	Opponent	Site	Result	Attendance	Source
September 29	at Minneapolis Central High School	Minneapolis, MN	W 20–0		
October 5	Grinnell	Minneapolis, MN	L 4–6		
October 12	at Boat Club		W 6–0		
October 19	Iowa Agricultural	Minneapolis, MN	W 24–0		
October 25	at Chicago	Marshall Field; Chicago, IL	W 10–6		
October 29	at Purdue	Stuart Field; West Lafayette, IN	L 4–16		
November 2	at Macalester	Saint Paul, MN	W 40–0		
November 16	Wisconsin	Athletic Park; Minneapolis, MN (rivalry)	W 14–10		
November 23	vs. Michigan	Baseball Park; Detroit, MI (rivalry)	L 0–20	3,500	
November 28	Ex-Collegiates	Minneapolis, MN	W 14–0		

== Roster ==
- Ends, Jack Harrison (left end); Thomas M. Kehoe (right end)
- Tackles, John S. Dalrymple (left tackle); Willis J. Walker (right tackle)
- Guards, Augustus T. Larson (captain and left guard); George A.E. Finlayson (right guard)
- Center, James C. Fulton
- Quarterback, Charles E. Adams
- Halfbacks, George T. Pettibone (left halfback); Henry C. Loomis (right halfback)
- Fullback, Herbert A. Parkyn
- Substitutes, Clinton L. Walker, Martin Teigen, Ivan A. Parry, Stanley H. Bissell, John B. Loomis, H.B. Gilbert
- Trainer, Edward "Dad" Moulton
- Coach, Pudge Heffelfinger

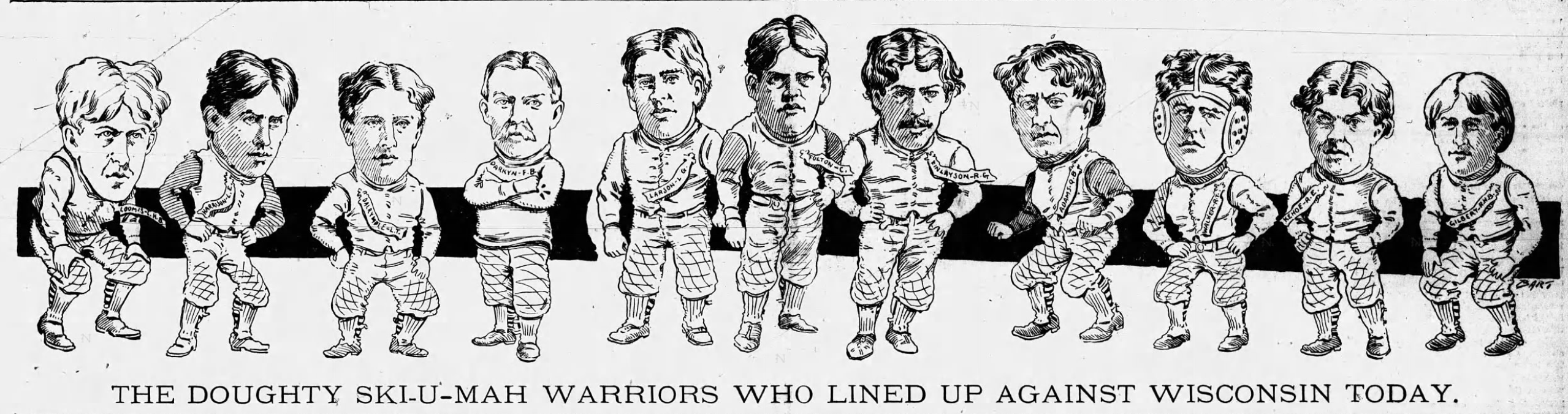
Minnesota Golden Gophers "Ski-U-Mah" boys of 1895

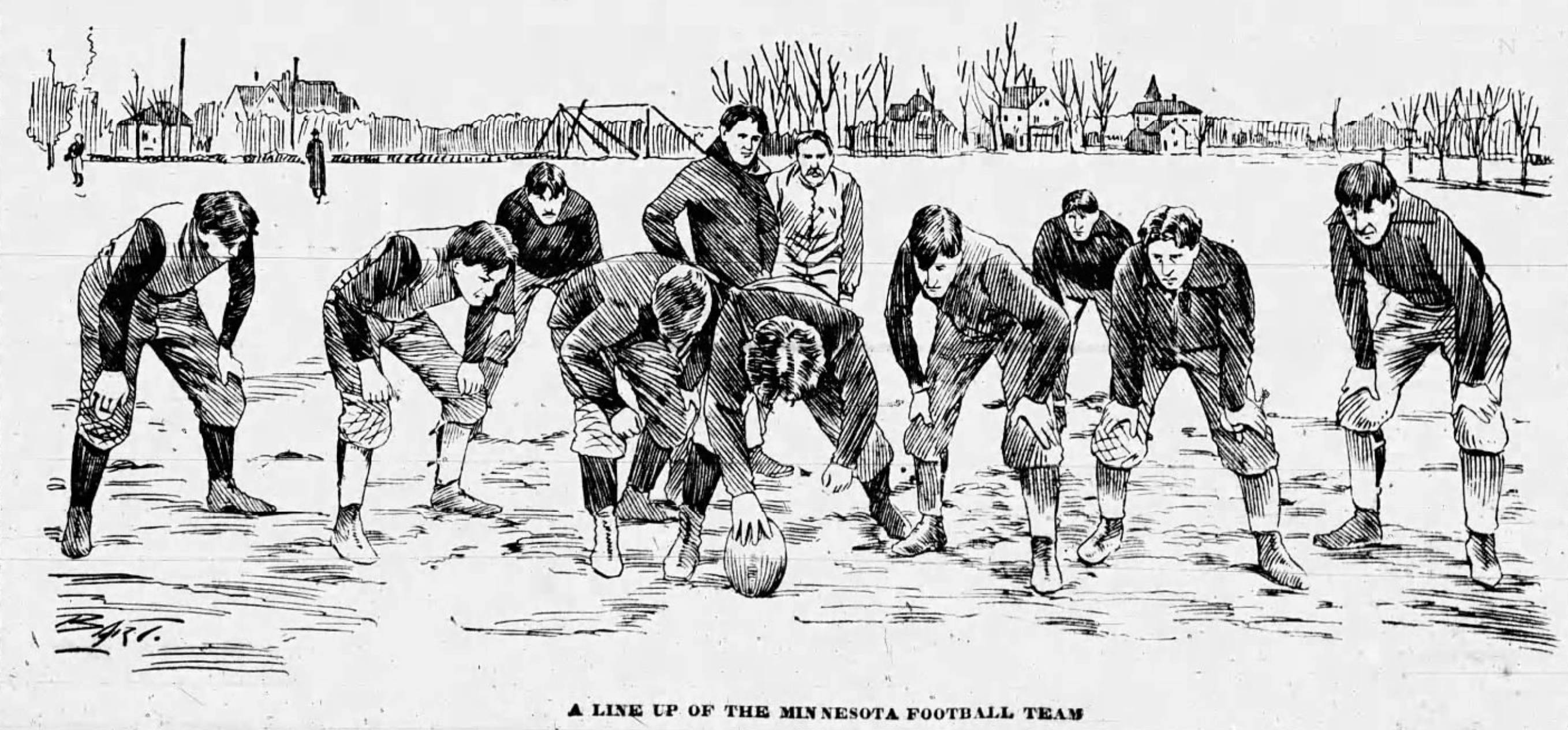
1895 Minnesota Golden Gophers football team
