= Harvey Derne =

American football coach

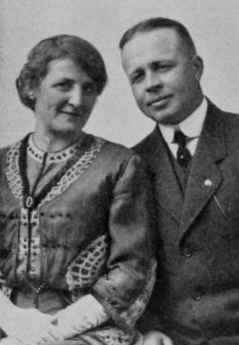
- Myra Jane and Harvey A. Derne

Biographical details
- Born: May 1, 1874; Union Bridge, Maryland, U.S.
- Died: January 1, 1921 (aged 46); Columbus, Ohio, U.S.
- Education: St. John's (MD)

Coaching career (HC unless noted)
- 1895: Ohio

Head coaching record
- Overall: 2–3

Harvey A. Derne (May 1, 1874 – January 1, 1921) was an American college football coach and a figure in the lumber industry in the early 1900s. He served as the head football coach at Ohio University in 1895, compiling a record of 2–3. Derne served was a noted athlete at St. John's College in Annapolis, Maryland.

== Biography ==
Harvey Derne was born in Union Bridge, Maryland. He married Myra Jane Weaver on September 28, 1905.

He died in an auto accident in Columbus, Ohio on January 1, 1921. At the time of his death, he was an employee at the W. M. Ritter Lumber Company.

== Head coaching record ==
Year	Team	Overall	Conference	Standing	Bowl/playoffs
Ohio Green and White (Independent) (1895)
1895	Ohio	2–3			
Ohio:		2–3			
Total:		2–3			
