= 1895 Wisconsin Badgers football team =

American college football season

1895 Wisconsin Badgers football
- Conference: Independent
- Record: 5–2–1
- Head coach: Hiram O. Stickney (2nd season)
- Captain: John R. Richards
- Home stadium: Randall Field

1895 Midwestern college football independents records
	Conf.			Overall
Team	W	L	T	W		L		T
Miami (OH)		–		3	–	0	–	0
Carthage		–		2	–	0	–	0
Washington University		–		2	–	0	–	0
Michigan		–		8	–	1	–	0
Chicago		–		10	–	3	–	0
Wittenberg		–		5	–	2	–	0
Minnesota		–		7	–	3	–	0
Wisconsin		–		5	–	2	–	1
Wabash		–		6	–	3	–	0
Baldwin–Wallace		–		3	–	1	–	0
Notre Dame		–		3	–	1	–	0
Illinois		–		4	–	2	–	1
Buchtel		–		3	–	2	–	0
College of Emporia		–		3	–	2	–	0
Doane		–		3	–	2	–	0
Chicago P&S		–		3	–	2	–	1
Purdue		–		4	–	3	–	0
Indiana		–		4	–	3	–	1
Northwestern		–		6	–	5	–	0
Butler		–		2	–	2	–	0
Cincinnati		–		3	–	3	–	0
Kalamazoo		–		1	–	1	–	0
Michigan State Normal		–		3	–	3	–	0
North Dakota Agricultural		–		1	–	1	–	0
North Dakota		–		1	–	1	–	0
Ohio State		–		4	–	4	–	2
Iowa Agricultural		–		3	–	4	–	0
Ohio		–		2	–	3	–	0
Rush-Lake Forest		–		4	–	6	–	0
Ohio Wesleyan		–		2	–	4	–	1
Haskell		–		1	–	2	–	0
Iowa State Normal		–		1	–	2	–	0
Lake Forest		–		1	–	2	–	0
Northwestern Law		–		1	–	2	–	0
Drake		–		1	–	4	–	0

The 1895 Wisconsin Badgers football team represented the University of Wisconsin as an independent during the 1895 college football season. Led by Hiram O. Stickney in his second and final season as head coach, the Badgers compiled a record of 5–2–1. The team's captain was John R. Richards.

== Schedule ==
Date	Opponent	Site	Result	Source
September 21	vs. Northwestern	State Fair Park; West Allis, WI	W 12–6	
September 30	Iowa Agricultural	Randall Field; Madison, WI	W 28–6	
October 5	Armour	Randall Field; Madison, WI	W 32–4	
October 12	Rush–Lake Forest	Randall Field; Madison, WI	W 26–5	
October 19	Grinnell	Randall Field; Madison, WI	W 14–4	
October 26	Illinois	Randall Field; Madison, WI	T 10–10	
November 2	at Chicago	Marshall Field; Chicago, IL	L 12–22	
November 16	at Minnesota	Athletic Park; Minneapolis, MN (rivalry)	L 10–14	

== Roster ==
No.	Player	Position	Height	Weight	Hometown	High school
	Walter Alexander	Left tackle	5-10	163		
	E. S. Anderson	Right end	5-11	158		
	C. S. Berryman	Substitute	5-6	136		
	Nathan Comstock	Right guard	5-10	189		
	H. F. Dickinson	Right end	5-11	169		
	J. E. Dutcher		5-10	162		
	H. S. Forrest	Substitute	6-2	173		
	John P. Gregg	Left halfback	5-8	148		
	Herbert H. Jacobs	Right guard	5-11	188		
	John C. Karel	Right halfback	5-10	158		
	Fred Kull	Center	6-2	215		
	J. F. A. Pyre	Right tackle	5-10	170		
Captain	John R. Richards	Fullback	6-1	180		
	Jerry P. Riordan	Left guard	6-0	184		
	W. H. Sheldon	Left end	5-9	145		
	T. P. Silverwood	Substitute	5-11	164		
	George Thompson	Left halfback	5-8	144		
	G. H. Trautman	Quarterback	5-8	138		

Roster from 1895 Badger Yearbook
