= 1895 Purdue Boilermakers football team =

American college football season

1895 Purdue Boilermakers football
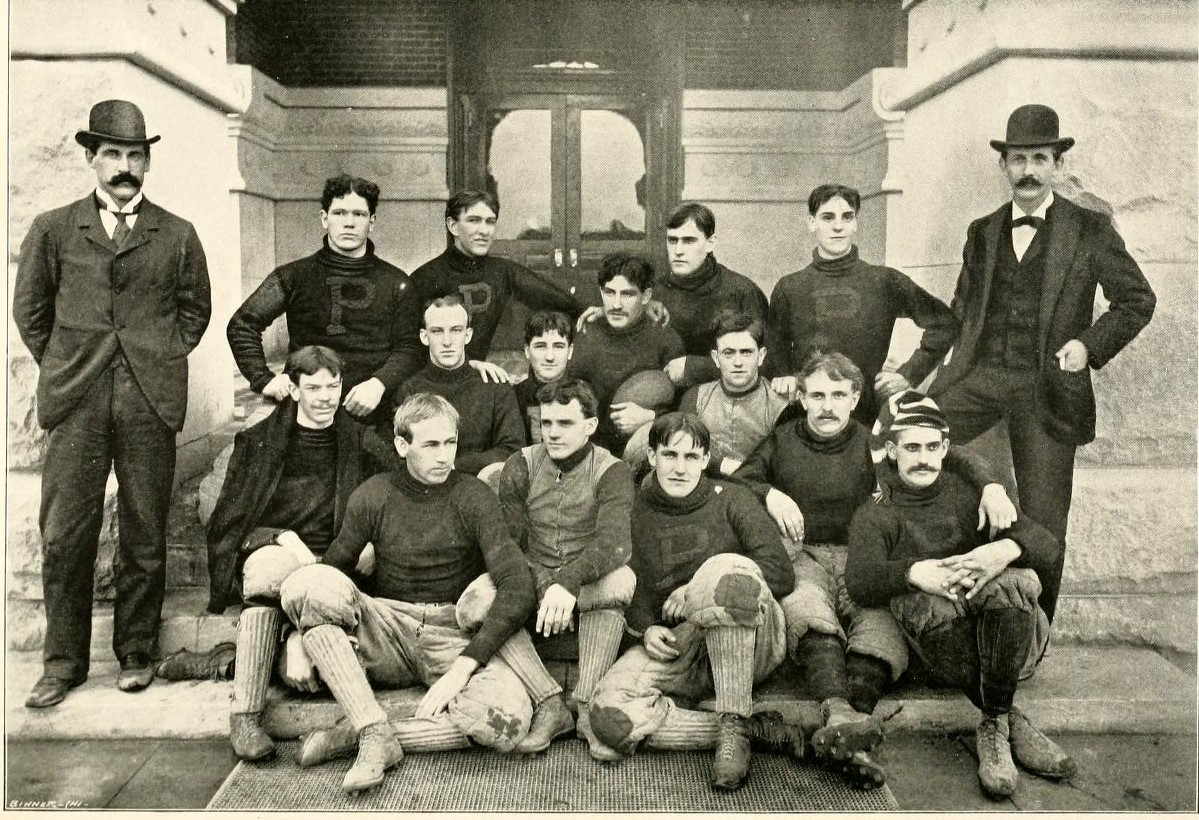
- Conference: Independent
- Record: 4–3
- Head coach: D. M. Balliet (3rd season)
- Captain: C. H. Robertson
- Home stadium: Stuart Field

1895 Midwestern college football independents records
	Conf.			Overall
Team	W	L	T	W		L		T
Miami (OH)		–		3	–	0	–	0
Carthage		–		2	–	0	–	0
Washington University		–		2	–	0	–	0
Michigan		–		8	–	1	–	0
Chicago		–		10	–	3	–	0
Wittenberg		–		5	–	2	–	0
Minnesota		–		7	–	3	–	0
Wisconsin		–		5	–	2	–	1
Wabash		–		6	–	3	–	0
Baldwin–Wallace		–		3	–	1	–	0
Notre Dame		–		3	–	1	–	0
Illinois		–		4	–	2	–	1
Buchtel		–		3	–	2	–	0
College of Emporia		–		3	–	2	–	0
Doane		–		3	–	2	–	0
Chicago P&S		–		3	–	2	–	1
Purdue		–		4	–	3	–	0
Indiana		–		4	–	3	–	1
Northwestern		–		6	–	5	–	0
Butler		–		2	–	2	–	0
Cincinnati		–		3	–	3	–	0
Kalamazoo		–		1	–	1	–	0
Michigan State Normal		–		3	–	3	–	0
North Dakota Agricultural		–		1	–	1	–	0
North Dakota		–		1	–	1	–	0
Ohio State		–		4	–	4	–	2
Iowa Agricultural		–		3	–	4	–	0
Ohio		–		2	–	3	–	0
Rush-Lake Forest		–		4	–	6	–	0
Ohio Wesleyan		–		2	–	4	–	1
Haskell		–		1	–	2	–	0
Iowa State Normal		–		1	–	2	–	0
Lake Forest		–		1	–	2	–	0
Northwestern Law		–		1	–	2	–	0
Drake		–		1	–	4	–	0

The 1895 Purdue Boilermakers football team was an American football team that represented Purdue University during the 1895 college football season. The Boilermakers compiled a 4–3 record and outscored their opponents by a total of 84 to 58 in their third season under head coach D. M. Balliet. C. H. Robertson was the team captain.

== Schedule ==
Date	Time	Opponent	Site	Result	Attendance	Source
September 26		Iowa Agricultural	Stuart Field; West Lafayette, IN	W 6–0 (forfeit)		
October 12		Kentucky	Stuart Field; West Lafayette, IN	W 32–0		
October 19	3:00 p.m.	vs. Missouri	West End grounds; St. Louis, MO	L 6–16		
October 29		Minnesota	Stuart Field; West Lafayette, IN	W 18–4		
November 2		Northwestern	Stuart Field; West Lafayette, IN	L 6–24		
November 16		at Michigan	Regents Field; Ann Arbor, MI	L 10–12	1,000	
November 28		Illinois	Stuart Field; West Lafayette, IN (rivalry)	W 6–2	5,000–7,000	

== Roster ==
- A. F. Alward, T
- Harry Bushman, HB-QB
- John Esterline, FB
- Alpha Jamison, HB-FB-QB
- Joe Kerchival, G
- Charles Kingsbury, E
- Bill Kirchoff, E
- Jim Mallot, HB
- Cloyd Marshall, E-FB
- William Moore, HB
- C. H. Robertson, T-G-C
- C. A. Schmitz, HB-FB
- L. C. Smith, T
- L. B. Webb, G
