= 1895 Drake Bulldogs football team =

American college football season

1895 Drake Bulldogs football
- Conference: Independent
- Record: 1–4
- Head coach: Hermon Williams (1st season)

1895 Midwestern college football independents records
| | Conf. | | | Overall |
| Team | W | L | T | W | | L | | T |
|---|---|---|---|---|---|---|---|---|
| Miami (OH) | | – | | 3 | – | 0 | – | 0 |
| Carthage | | – | | 2 | – | 0 | – | 0 |
| Washington University | | – | | 2 | – | 0 | – | 0 |
| Michigan | | – | | 8 | – | 1 | – | 0 |
| Chicago | | – | | 10 | – | 3 | – | 0 |
| Wittenberg | | – | | 5 | – | 2 | – | 0 |
| Minnesota | | – | | 7 | – | 3 | – | 0 |
| Wisconsin | | – | | 5 | – | 2 | – | 1 |
| Wabash | | – | | 6 | – | 3 | – | 0 |
| Baldwin–Wallace | | – | | 3 | – | 1 | – | 0 |
| Notre Dame | | – | | 3 | – | 1 | – | 0 |
| Illinois | | – | | 4 | – | 2 | – | 1 |
| Buchtel | | – | | 3 | – | 2 | – | 0 |
| College of Emporia | | – | | 3 | – | 2 | – | 0 |
| Doane | | – | | 3 | – | 2 | – | 0 |
| Chicago P&S | | – | | 3 | – | 2 | – | 1 |
| Purdue | | – | | 4 | – | 3 | – | 0 |
| Indiana | | – | | 4 | – | 3 | – | 1 |
| Northwestern | | – | | 6 | – | 5 | – | 0 |
| Butler | | – | | 2 | – | 2 | – | 0 |
| Cincinnati | | – | | 3 | – | 3 | – | 0 |
| Kalamazoo | | – | | 1 | – | 1 | – | 0 |
| Michigan State Normal | | – | | 3 | – | 3 | – | 0 |
| North Dakota Agricultural | | – | | 1 | – | 1 | – | 0 |
| North Dakota | | – | | 1 | – | 1 | – | 0 |
| Ohio State | | – | | 4 | – | 4 | – | 2 |
| Iowa Agricultural | | – | | 3 | – | 4 | – | 0 |
| Ohio | | – | | 2 | – | 3 | – | 0 |
| Rush-Lake Forest | | – | | 4 | – | 6 | – | 0 |
| Ohio Wesleyan | | – | | 2 | – | 4 | – | 1 |
| Haskell | | – | | 1 | – | 2 | – | 0 |
| Iowa State Normal | | – | | 1 | – | 2 | – | 0 |
| Lake Forest | | – | | 1 | – | 2 | – | 0 |
| Northwestern Law | | – | | 1 | – | 2 | – | 0 |
| Drake | | – | | 1 | – | 4 | – | 0 |

The 1895 Drake Bulldogs football team was an American football team represented Drake University as an independent during the 1895 college football season. In its first and only season under head coach Hermon Williams, the team compiled a 1–4 record and was outscored by a total of 48 to 22.

== Schedule ==
| Date | Opponent | Site | Result |
|---|---|---|---|
| September 14 | at Panora Athletic Club | Panora, IA | W 0–6 (forfeit) |
| September 28 | at YMCA | | L 0–4 |
| October 23 | at Penn (IA) | Oskaloosa, IA | L 0–4 |
| November 2 | Simpson | Des Moines, IA | L 16–18 |
| September 28 | at YMCA | | L 0–22 |
