= 1895 Notre Dame football team =

American collegiate football team

1895 Notre Dame football
- Conference: Independent
- Record: 3–1
- Head coach: H. G. Hadden (1st season)
- Captain: Dan Casey
- Home stadium: Brownson Hall field

1895 Midwestern college football independents records
	Conf.			Overall
Team	W	L	T	W		L		T
Miami (OH)		–		3	–	0	–	0
Carthage		–		2	–	0	–	0
Washington University		–		2	–	0	–	0
Michigan		–		8	–	1	–	0
Chicago		–		10	–	3	–	0
Wittenberg		–		5	–	2	–	0
Minnesota		–		7	–	3	–	0
Wisconsin		–		5	–	2	–	1
Wabash		–		6	–	3	–	0
Baldwin–Wallace		–		3	–	1	–	0
Notre Dame		–		3	–	1	–	0
Illinois		–		4	–	2	–	1
Buchtel		–		3	–	2	–	0
College of Emporia		–		3	–	2	–	0
Doane		–		3	–	2	–	0
Chicago P&S		–		3	–	2	–	1
Purdue		–		4	–	3	–	0
Indiana		–		4	–	3	–	1
Northwestern		–		6	–	5	–	0
Butler		–		2	–	2	–	0
Cincinnati		–		3	–	3	–	0
Kalamazoo		–		1	–	1	–	0
Michigan State Normal		–		3	–	3	–	0
North Dakota Agricultural		–		1	–	1	–	0
North Dakota		–		1	–	1	–	0
Ohio State		–		4	–	4	–	2
Iowa Agricultural		–		3	–	4	–	0
Ohio		–		2	–	3	–	0
Rush-Lake Forest		–		4	–	6	–	0
Ohio Wesleyan		–		2	–	4	–	1
Haskell		–		1	–	2	–	0
Iowa State Normal		–		1	–	2	–	0
Lake Forest		–		1	–	2	–	0
Northwestern Law		–		1	–	2	–	0
Drake		–		1	–	4	–	0

The 1895 Notre Dame football team was an American football team that represented the University of Notre Dame in the 1895 college football season. In its first and only season under head coach H. G. Hadden, the team compiled a 3–1 record and outscored its opponents by a combined total of 70 to 20. Alvin H. Culver also coached the team.

== Schedule ==
Date	Opponent	Site	Result	Source
October 19	Northwestern Law	Brownson Hall field; Notre Dame, IN	W 20–0	
November 7	Illinois Cycling Club	Brownson Hall field; Notre Dame, IN	W 18–2	
November 14	Rush-Lake Forest	Brownson Hall field; Notre Dame, IN	Cancelled	
November 22	Indianapolis Light Artillery	Brownson Hall field; Notre Dame, IN	L 0–18	
November 28	Chicago Physicians and Surgeons	Brownson Hall field; Notre Dame, IN	W 32–0	

- The team that played against Northwestern Law school on October 19 was technically not the varsity, but was instead made up of candidates for the varsity team.
