= 1895 Indiana Hoosiers football team =

American college football season

1895 Indiana Hoosiers football
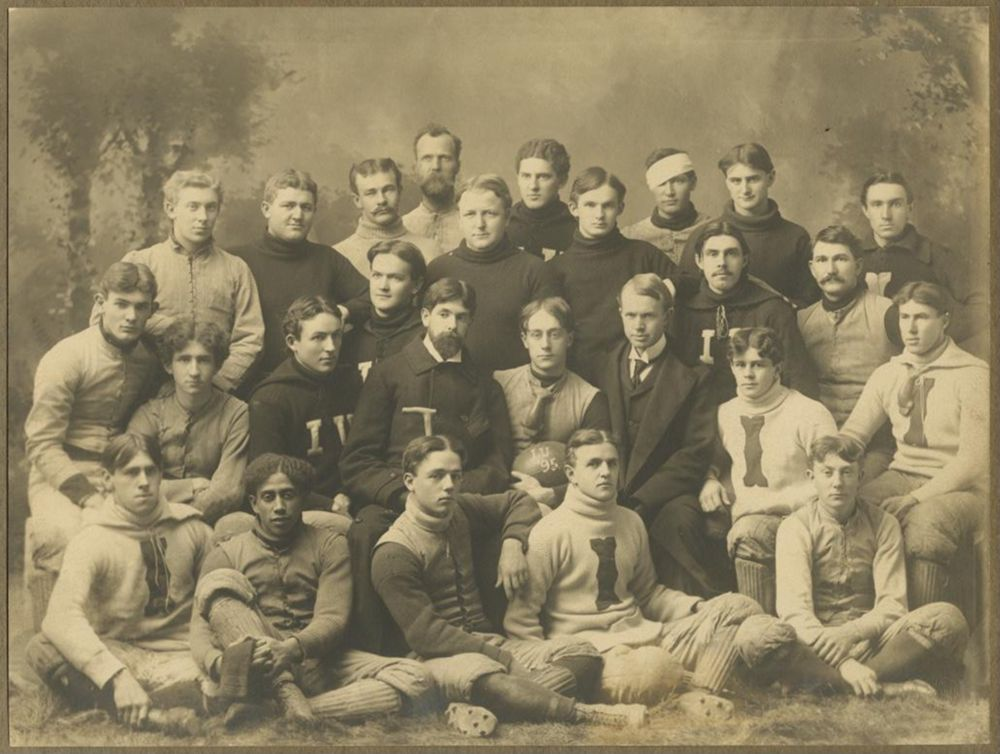
- Conference: Independent
- Record: 4–3–1
- Head coach: Winchester Osgood & Robert Wrenn (1st season)
- Captain: Emmett O. King
- Home stadium: Athletic Field

1895 Midwestern college football independents records
	Conf.			Overall
Team	W	L	T	W		L		T
Miami (OH)		–		3	–	0	–	0
Carthage		–		2	–	0	–	0
Washington University		–		2	–	0	–	0
Michigan		–		8	–	1	–	0
Chicago		–		10	–	3	–	0
Wittenberg		–		5	–	2	–	0
Minnesota		–		7	–	3	–	0
Wisconsin		–		5	–	2	–	1
Wabash		–		6	–	3	–	0
Baldwin–Wallace		–		3	–	1	–	0
Notre Dame		–		3	–	1	–	0
Illinois		–		4	–	2	–	1
Buchtel		–		3	–	2	–	0
College of Emporia		–		3	–	2	–	0
Doane		–		3	–	2	–	0
Chicago P&S		–		3	–	2	–	1
Purdue		–		4	–	3	–	0
Indiana		–		4	–	3	–	1
Northwestern		–		6	–	5	–	0
Butler		–		2	–	2	–	0
Cincinnati		–		3	–	3	–	0
Kalamazoo		–		1	–	1	–	0
Michigan State Normal		–		3	–	3	–	0
North Dakota Agricultural		–		1	–	1	–	0
North Dakota		–		1	–	1	–	0
Ohio State		–		4	–	4	–	2
Iowa Agricultural		–		3	–	4	–	0
Ohio		–		2	–	3	–	0
Rush-Lake Forest		–		4	–	6	–	0
Ohio Wesleyan		–		2	–	4	–	1
Haskell		–		1	–	2	–	0
Iowa State Normal		–		1	–	2	–	0
Lake Forest		–		1	–	2	–	0
Northwestern Law		–		1	–	2	–	0
Drake		–		1	–	4	–	0

The 1895 Indiana Hoosiers football team was an American football team that represented Indiana University Bloomington during the 1895 college football season. Prior to 1895, Indiana had fielded a football team in seven seasons and had yet to win an intercollegiate football game. For the 1895 season, Indiana hired former Harvard quarterback and national tennis champion Robert Wrenn to coach its football team. Under Wrenn's leadership, the Indiana football team compiled a 4–3–1 record, including the university's first intercollegiate football victories, over Rose Polytechnic (8–4) and Wabash (12–10).

== Schedule ==
Date	Time	Opponent	Site	Result	Attendance	Source
October 12	3:45 p.m.	at Louisville Athletic Club	Louisville, KY	W 36–0	500	
October 24		Indianapolis Light Artillery	Athletic Field; Bloomington, IN	L 8–16	500	
October 30		vs. Noblesville Athletic Club	Indianapolis, IN	W 30–0		
November 4		at DePauw	McKeen Athletic Park; Greencastle, IN	L 0–14	400	
November 11		DePauw	Athletic Field; Bloomington, IN	T 12–12		
November 16		at Butler	Ohio Street grounds; Indianapolis, IN	L 2–34	300	
November 23		Rose Polytechnic	Bloomington, IN	W 8–4		
November 28	2:30 p.m.	at Wabash	Philistine Field; Crawfordsville, IN	W 12–10		

== Personnel ==
=== Roster ===
Name	Position	Year
William Stoops Coleman		
Preston Eagleson	Right Halfback	Senior
Edgar Allen Binford	Quarterback	
Oscar Butler Perry		
William David Youtsler		
Emmett Forest Branch		
Horace G. Hardy		
Frank C. Stevenson		
Winston Menzies		
Newsom		
Lee F. Hunt		
Daniel Walter Sheek	Left End	
Roy Dee Keehn		
Carl Elbert Endicott	Left Guard	
George Marlin Cook	Center	
W. Robert Hunter		
Arlie Roy Williams	Fullback	
Charles Otis Signs		
Raymond D. Thompson	Right End	
Emmett Orlando King (C)	Right Guard	
Fred Eugene Ferguson	Right Tackle	
Alpheus Wilberforce Moon		
Herbert Valodin Barbour		
Frank Wayne Ray		
John Clark Hubbard	Left Halfback	
Edwin C. Crampton		
Hence Irwin Orme	Left Tackle	
