= Hermon Williams =

American football coach (1872–1958)

Biographical details
- Born: February 16, 1872; Iowa City, Iowa, U.S.
- Died: July 21, 1958 (aged 86); Albuquerque, New Mexico, U.S.
- Education: Drake University

Coaching career (HC unless noted)
- 1895: Drake

Head coaching record
- Overall: 1–4

Hermon Porter Williams (February 16, 1872 – July 21, 1958) was an American football coach. He was the second head football coach for the Drake University in Des Moines, Iowa, and he held that position for the 1895 season. His coaching record at Drake was 1–4.

He is buried in Arlington National Cemetery.

== Head coaching record ==
Year	Team	Overall	Conference	Standing	Bowl/playoffs
Drake Bulldogs (Independent) (1895)
1895	Drake	1–4			
Drake:		1–4			
Total:		1–4			
