= 1895 Illinois Fighting Illini football team =

American college football season

1895 Illinois Fighting Illini football
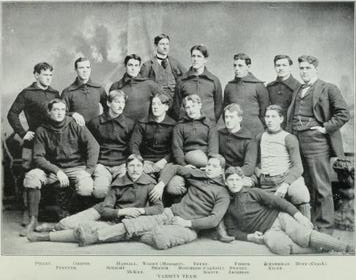
- Conference: Independent
- Record: 4–2–1
- Head coach: George Huff (1st season)
- Captain: Robert J. Hotchkiss
- Home stadium: Illinois Field

1895 Midwestern college football independents records
	Conf.			Overall
Team	W	L	T	W		L		T
Miami (OH)		–		3	–	0	–	0
Carthage		–		2	–	0	–	0
Washington University		–		2	–	0	–	0
Michigan		–		8	–	1	–	0
Chicago		–		10	–	3	–	0
Wittenberg		–		5	–	2	–	0
Minnesota		–		7	–	3	–	0
Wisconsin		–		5	–	2	–	1
Wabash		–		6	–	3	–	0
Baldwin–Wallace		–		3	–	1	–	0
Notre Dame		–		3	–	1	–	0
Illinois		–		4	–	2	–	1
Buchtel		–		3	–	2	–	0
College of Emporia		–		3	–	2	–	0
Doane		–		3	–	2	–	0
Chicago P&S		–		3	–	2	–	1
Purdue		–		4	–	3	–	0
Indiana		–		4	–	3	–	1
Northwestern		–		6	–	5	–	0
Butler		–		2	–	2	–	0
Cincinnati		–		3	–	3	–	0
Kalamazoo		–		1	–	1	–	0
Michigan State Normal		–		3	–	3	–	0
North Dakota Agricultural		–		1	–	1	–	0
North Dakota		–		1	–	1	–	0
Ohio State		–		4	–	4	–	2
Iowa Agricultural		–		3	–	4	–	0
Ohio		–		2	–	3	–	0
Rush-Lake Forest		–		4	–	6	–	0
Ohio Wesleyan		–		2	–	4	–	1
Haskell		–		1	–	2	–	0
Iowa State Normal		–		1	–	2	–	0
Lake Forest		–		1	–	2	–	0
Northwestern Law		–		1	–	2	–	0
Drake		–		1	–	4	–	0

The 1895 Illinois Fighting Illini football team was an American football team that represented the University of Illinois during the 1895 college football season. In their first season under head coach George Huff, the Illini compiled a 4–2–1 record. Fullback Robert J. Hotchkiss was the team captain.

== Schedule ==
Date	Opponent	Site	Result	Attendance	Source
October 5	Wabash	Illinois Field; Champaign, IL	W 48–0		
October 12	at Chicago Athletic Association	Washington Park Field; Chicago, IL	L 0–8		
October 19	Illinois College	Illinois Field; Champaign, IL	W 79–0		
October 26	at Wisconsin	Randall Field; Madison, WI	T 10–10		
November 2	Rush–Lake Forest	Illinois Field; Champaign, IL	W 38–0		
November 23	Northwestern	Illinois Field; Champaign, IL (rivalry)	W 38–4		
November 28	at Purdue	Stuart Field; West Lafayette, IN (rivalry)	L 2–6	5,000–7,000	

== Roster ==
Baum, Harry W. RHB; Beadle, Thomas B. LE; Beebe, Charles D. RG; Branch, James M. LE; Cooper, Paul H. RE; Fischer, Leon E. LG; Hadsall, Harry H. LE; Hotchkiss, R.J. FB (captain); Kiler, William H. FB; McKee, James H. QB; Pfeffer, James E. RT; Pixley, Arthur H. LT; Schacht, Frederick W. RE; Sconce, Harvey J. LHB; Sweney, Don LG; Thorby, C. Jacobson RHB; Zimmerman, Walter H. C	Substitutes: Beatty, J.W. RHB; Burkland, Theo L. FB; Forbes, Stuart F. LE; Merker, Henry F. LG

Source: University of Illinois
