= 1895 Ohio Green and White football team =

American college football season

1895 Ohio Green and White football
- Conference: Independent
- Record: 2–3
- Head coach: Harvey Derne (1st season)

1895 Midwestern college football independents records
	Conf.			Overall
Team	W	L	T	W		L		T
Miami (OH)		–		3	–	0	–	0
Carthage		–		2	–	0	–	0
Washington University		–		2	–	0	–	0
Michigan		–		8	–	1	–	0
Chicago		–		10	–	3	–	0
Wittenberg		–		5	–	2	–	0
Minnesota		–		7	–	3	–	0
Wisconsin		–		5	–	2	–	1
Wabash		–		6	–	3	–	0
Baldwin–Wallace		–		3	–	1	–	0
Notre Dame		–		3	–	1	–	0
Illinois		–		4	–	2	–	1
Buchtel		–		3	–	2	–	0
College of Emporia		–		3	–	2	–	0
Doane		–		3	–	2	–	0
Chicago P&S		–		3	–	2	–	1
Purdue		–		4	–	3	–	0
Indiana		–		4	–	3	–	1
Northwestern		–		6	–	5	–	0
Butler		–		2	–	2	–	0
Cincinnati		–		3	–	3	–	0
Kalamazoo		–		1	–	1	–	0
Michigan State Normal		–		3	–	3	–	0
North Dakota Agricultural		–		1	–	1	–	0
North Dakota		–		1	–	1	–	0
Ohio State		–		4	–	4	–	2
Iowa Agricultural		–		3	–	4	–	0
Ohio		–		2	–	3	–	0
Rush-Lake Forest		–		4	–	6	–	0
Ohio Wesleyan		–		2	–	4	–	1
Haskell		–		1	–	2	–	0
Iowa State Normal		–		1	–	2	–	0
Lake Forest		–		1	–	2	–	0
Northwestern Law		–		1	–	2	–	0
Drake		–		1	–	4	–	0

The 1895 Ohio Green and White football team was an American football team that represented Ohio University as an independent during the 1895 college football season. In its second season of intercollegiate football, Ohio compiled a 2–3 record and was outscored by a total of 128 to 78. Harvey Derne was the team's head coach; it was Derne's first and only season in the position. The team's 60–0 victory over Lancaster set a record for the largest margin of victory in school history. That record stood for 21 years.

== Schedule ==
Date	Opponent	Site	Result	Source
	Parker High School		W 18–0	
October 12	at Ohio Wesleyan	Delaware, OH	L 0–38	
October 26	Marietta		L 0–24	
November 13	at Marietta	Marietta, OH	L 0–66	
November 29	at Lancaster	Lancaster, OH	W 60–0	
