= 1895 Northwestern Purple football team =

American college football season

1895 Northwestern Purple football
- Conference: Independent
- Record: 6–5
- Head coach: Alvin H. Culver (1st season)
- Captain: Jesse Van Doozer

1895 Midwestern college football independents records
	Conf.			Overall
Team	W	L	T	W		L		T
Miami (OH)		–		3	–	0	–	0
Carthage		–		2	–	0	–	0
Washington University		–		2	–	0	–	0
Michigan		–		8	–	1	–	0
Chicago		–		10	–	3	–	0
Wittenberg		–		5	–	2	–	0
Minnesota		–		7	–	3	–	0
Wisconsin		–		5	–	2	–	1
Wabash		–		6	–	3	–	0
Baldwin–Wallace		–		3	–	1	–	0
Notre Dame		–		3	–	1	–	0
Illinois		–		4	–	2	–	1
Buchtel		–		3	–	2	–	0
College of Emporia		–		3	–	2	–	0
Doane		–		3	–	2	–	0
Chicago P&S		–		3	–	2	–	1
Purdue		–		4	–	3	–	0
Indiana		–		4	–	3	–	1
Northwestern		–		6	–	5	–	0
Butler		–		2	–	2	–	0
Cincinnati		–		3	–	3	–	0
Kalamazoo		–		1	–	1	–	0
Michigan State Normal		–		3	–	3	–	0
North Dakota Agricultural		–		1	–	1	–	0
North Dakota		–		1	–	1	–	0
Ohio State		–		4	–	4	–	2
Iowa Agricultural		–		3	–	4	–	0
Ohio		–		2	–	3	–	0
Rush-Lake Forest		–		4	–	6	–	0
Ohio Wesleyan		–		2	–	4	–	1
Haskell		–		1	–	2	–	0
Iowa State Normal		–		1	–	2	–	0
Lake Forest		–		1	–	2	–	0
Northwestern Law		–		1	–	2	–	0
Drake		–		1	–	4	–	0

The 1895 Northwestern Purple team represented Northwestern University during the 1895 college football season. In their first year under head coach Jesse Van Doozer, the Purple compiled a 6–5 record.

== Schedule ==
Date	Opponent	Site	Result	Source
September 21	vs. Wisconsin	State Fair Park; West Allis, WI	L 6–12	
September 28	Iowa Agricultural	Evanston, IL	L 0–36	
October 3	Evanston High	Evanston, IL	W 16–0	
October 5	Beloit	Evanston, IL	W 34–6	
October 12	Armour	Evanston, IL	W 44–0	
October 19	at Chicago	Marshall Field; Chicago, IL	W 22–6	
October 31	Rush-Lake Forest	Evanston, IL	W 24–0	
November 2	at Purdue	Stuart Field; Lafayette, IN	W 24–6	
November 9	vs. Missouri	Sharpshooters' Park; St. Louis, MO	L 18–22	
November 16	Chicago	Evanston, IL	L 0–6	
November 23	at Illinois	Athletic Park; Champaign, IL (rivalry)	L 4–38	
