= 1895 Haskell Indians football team =

American college football season

1895 Haskell Indians football
- Conference: Independent
- Record: 1–2
- Head coach: Unknown

1895 Midwestern college football independents records
	Conf.			Overall
Team	W	L	T	W		L		T
Miami (OH)		–		3	–	0	–	0
Carthage		–		2	–	0	–	0
Washington University		–		2	–	0	–	0
Michigan		–		8	–	1	–	0
Chicago		–		10	–	3	–	0
Wittenberg		–		5	–	2	–	0
Minnesota		–		7	–	3	–	0
Wisconsin		–		5	–	2	–	1
Wabash		–		6	–	3	–	0
Baldwin–Wallace		–		3	–	1	–	0
Notre Dame		–		3	–	1	–	0
Illinois		–		4	–	2	–	1
Buchtel		–		3	–	2	–	0
College of Emporia		–		3	–	2	–	0
Doane		–		3	–	2	–	0
Chicago P&S		–		3	–	2	–	1
Purdue		–		4	–	3	–	0
Indiana		–		4	–	3	–	1
Northwestern		–		6	–	5	–	0
Butler		–		2	–	2	–	0
Cincinnati		–		3	–	3	–	0
Kalamazoo		–		1	–	1	–	0
Michigan State Normal		–		3	–	3	–	0
North Dakota Agricultural		–		1	–	1	–	0
North Dakota		–		1	–	1	–	0
Ohio State		–		4	–	4	–	2
Iowa Agricultural		–		3	–	4	–	0
Ohio		–		2	–	3	–	0
Rush-Lake Forest		–		4	–	6	–	0
Ohio Wesleyan		–		2	–	4	–	1
Haskell		–		1	–	2	–	0
Iowa State Normal		–		1	–	2	–	0
Lake Forest		–		1	–	2	–	0
Northwestern Law		–		1	–	2	–	0
Drake		–		1	–	4	–	0

The 1895 Haskell Indians football team was an American football team that represented the Haskell Indian Institute (now known as Haskell Indian Nations University) as an independent during the 1895 college football season. Prior to the fall of 1895, Haskell had fielded a baseball team. The 1895 season was the school's first competing in football. It was also in 1894 and 1895 that Haskell expanded its curriculum to include a teacher-training program and a commercial program; the school had previously been limited to training its students for jobs of manual labor. In her history of Haskell Institute, Myriam Vuckovic wrote that football competition with white schools served a symbolic function: "The gridiron became a mystic space where Native Americans and whites were reliving their turbulent history and where old scores were settled. But unlike their fathers, grandfathers, and ancestors, Indian students at the end of the nineteenth century had the sympathy of the crowd. White football fans loved to cheer for Indian teams . . . "

After Haskell defeated the Kansas City High School team, The Kansas City Times wrote:

The Haskell players were big, heavy en who made the High school boys look like boys, indeed. They showed a lack of sufficient coaching, but, considering the fact that foot ball is something entirely new to all of them, they played a remarkably good game. They worked hard and ran fast, and had one of two men who could kick the ball from Dan to Beersheba. They were the most gentlemanly lot of players ever seen in a foot ball game, and the young men who play upon college and Y.M.C.A. clubs might do well to take a lesson from the Indians in how to be less like savages while on the foot ball field. When some of the High school boys scratched and gouged a bit, the big red fellow said: 'Don't do that, boys. We don't want to hurt you' ... The best work on either side was done by Bain, the big Indian full-back. When he started whatever was in front had to give way.

The team was reported to "terrify their opponents" with a "war cry" as follows:

Civilization! Rah! Rah! Rah
Heap Big Indian! La! La! La!
Scalp Em! Scalp Em!
Rah! Rah! Rah!

== Schedule ==
Date	Opponent	Site	Result	Source
October 26	at Kansas second team	McCook Field; Lawrence, KS	L 0–22	
November 2	at Kansas City High School	Exposition Baseball Park; Kansas City, MO	W 12–10	
November 28	at Junction City Athletics	Junction City, KS	L 0–6	

== Players ==
- Augusta - right guard
- Bain - fullback
- Buckhart or Buckheart - left guard
- Carl - left tackle
- Fielder - left halfback
- John - left end
- Long - center
- Smith - left halfback
- Swamp - right tackle
- Swett or Sweat - quarterback, right guard
- G. Vandall - right halfback
- T. Vandall - right end
- F. Vandull - right end
- J. Vandull - right halfback
- Wild Horse - left end
- Williams - quarterback
