= Everett B. Camp =

American football player and coach (1867–1938)

Biographical details
- Born: March 8, 1867; Cherry Tree, Pennsylvania, U.S.
- Died: February 26, 1938 (aged 70); Waynesville, North Carolina, U.S.
- Education: Penn (1893)

Playing career
- 1885–1888: Lafayette
- 1890–1892: Penn
- 1893: Columbia Athletic Club
- 1894–1895, 1897: Chicago Athletic Association
- 1897: Pittsburgh Athletic Club
- 1898: Chicago Athletic Association
- Position: Halfback

Coaching career (HC unless noted)
- 1893: Oberlin
- 1893: Columbia Athletic Club (co-coach)

Head coaching record
- Overall: 6–1 (college)

Everett Brace "Jake" Camp Sr. (March 8, 1867 – February 26, 1938) was an American college football player and coach. He served as the head football coach at Oberlin College in Oberlin, Ohio in 1893, compiling a record of 6–1. Camp was an 1893 graduate of the University of Pennsylvania Law School.

== Playing career ==
Camp played college football for seven years, four with Lafayette and the rest with Penn. By late November 1893, he was playing halfback for the Columbia Athletic Club of Washington, D.C., while also sharing the team's coaching duties with former Princeton end M. P. Randolph. Camp went on to play for the Chicago Athletic Association in 1894, 1895, 1897, and 1898. He was elected captain of the 1895 team, but was replaced in that role mid-season. Late in the 1897 season, he played for the Pittsburgh Athletic Club.

== Head coaching record ==
Year	Team	Overall	Conference	Standing	Bowl/playoffs
Oberlin Yeomen (Independent) (1893)
1893	Oberlin	6–1			
Oberlin:		6–1			
Total:		6–1			
