= 1895 Chicago Maroons football team =

American college football season

1895 Chicago Maroons football
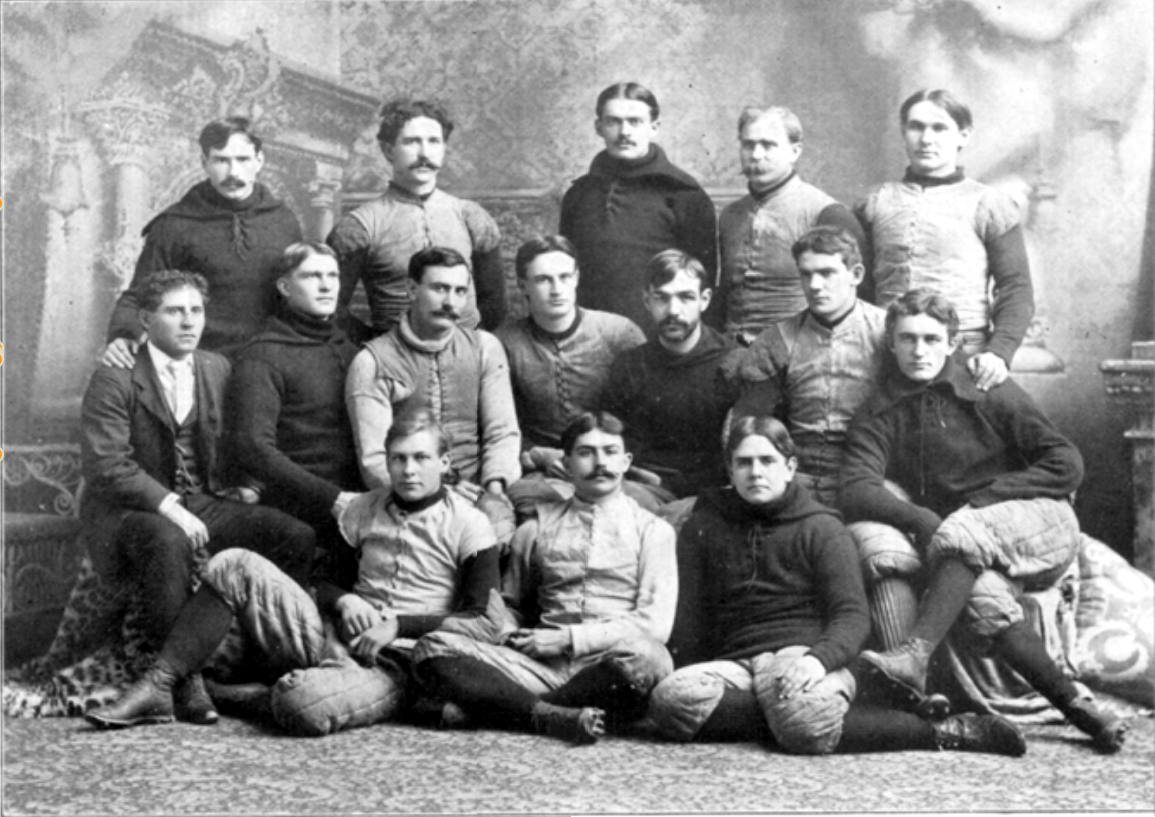
- Conference: Independent
- Record: 10–3
- Head coach: Amos Alonzo Stagg (4th season)
- Captain: Charles William Allen
- Home stadium: Marshall Field

1895 Midwestern college football independents records
	Conf.			Overall
Team	W	L	T	W		L		T
Miami (OH)		–		3	–	0	–	0
Carthage		–		2	–	0	–	0
Washington University		–		2	–	0	–	0
Michigan		–		8	–	1	–	0
Chicago		–		10	–	3	–	0
Wittenberg		–		5	–	2	–	0
Minnesota		–		7	–	3	–	0
Wisconsin		–		5	–	2	–	1
Wabash		–		6	–	3	–	0
Baldwin–Wallace		–		3	–	1	–	0
Notre Dame		–		3	–	1	–	0
Illinois		–		4	–	2	–	1
Buchtel		–		3	–	2	–	0
College of Emporia		–		3	–	2	–	0
Doane		–		3	–	2	–	0
Chicago P&S		–		3	–	2	–	1
Purdue		–		4	–	3	–	0
Indiana		–		4	–	3	–	1
Northwestern		–		6	–	5	–	0
Butler		–		2	–	2	–	0
Cincinnati		–		3	–	3	–	0
Kalamazoo		–		1	–	1	–	0
Michigan State Normal		–		3	–	3	–	0
North Dakota Agricultural		–		1	–	1	–	0
North Dakota		–		1	–	1	–	0
Ohio State		–		4	–	4	–	2
Iowa Agricultural		–		3	–	4	–	0
Ohio		–		2	–	3	–	0
Rush-Lake Forest		–		4	–	6	–	0
Ohio Wesleyan		–		2	–	4	–	1
Haskell		–		1	–	2	–	0
Iowa State Normal		–		1	–	2	–	0
Lake Forest		–		1	–	2	–	0
Northwestern Law		–		1	–	2	–	0
Drake		–		1	–	4	–	0

The 1895 Chicago Maroons football team was an American football team that represented the University of Chicago during the 1895 college football season. In their fourth season under head coach Amos Alonzo Stagg, the Maroons compiled a 10–3 record and outscored their opponents by a combined total of 260 to 66.

== Schedule ==
Date	Opponent	Site	Result	Attendance	Source
September 7	Englewood High School	Marshall Field; Chicago, IL	W 28–0		
September 14	Englewood YMCA	Marshall Field; Chicago, IL	W 42–6		
September 21	Eureka	Marshall Field; Chicago, IL	W 28–0		
September 24	Hyde Park High School	Marshall Field; Chicago, IL	W 24–0		
September 28	Chicago Athletic Association	Marshall Field; Chicago, IL	W 8–0		
October 5	Lake Forest	Marshall Field; Chicago, IL	W 52–0		
October 19	Northwestern	Marshall Field; Chicago, IL	L 6–22		
October 23	Armour	Marshall Field; Chicago, IL	W 24–4		
October 26	Minnesota	Marshall Field; Chicago, IL	L 6–10		
November 2	Wisconsin	Marshall Field; Chicago, IL	W 22–12		
November 9	at Adelbert	University grounds; Cleveland, OH	W 14–0		
November 16	at Northwestern	Northwestern Field; Evanston, IL	W 6–0		
November 28	Michigan	Marshall Field; Chicago, IL (rivalry)	L 0–12	10,000	

== Roster ==
Player	Position
Charles William Allen (captain)	right tackle
Phillip Allen	center
Addison Alvord Ewing	quarterback
Henry Gordon Gale	fullback
Nott W. Flint	left end
Henry Tefft Clarke	quarterback
Clarence Bert Herschberger	fullback
Carr Baker Neel	fullback
T. L. Ketman	right guard
John Lemay	left end
Looney	right guard
Frederick Day Nichols	right halfback
Charles Foster Roby	right end
William Rullkoetter	left guard
Earl V. Williamson	left tackle
Carter Van Vleck Brown	substitute
Herbert Wallace Dickey	substitute
Hugh Guthrie Leighton	substitute

- Head coach: Amos Alonzo Stagg (4th year at Chicago)
