= Jack Ryder (American football) =

American football player, coach, and sportswriter (1871–1936)

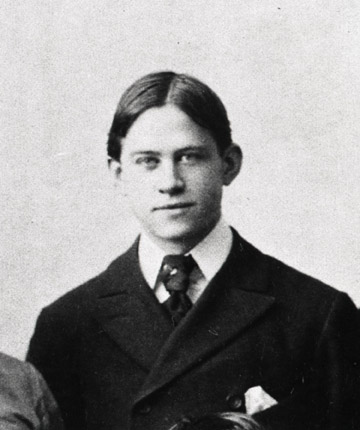
- Ryder, c. 1893

Biographical details
- Born: November 16, 1871; Oberlin, Ohio, U.S.
- Died: June 5, 1936 (aged 64); Cincinnati, Ohio, U.S.

Playing career
- 1891: Williams

Coaching career (HC unless noted)
- 1892–1895: Ohio State
- 1898: Ohio State

Head coaching record
- Overall: 22–22–2

Frederick Bushnell Ryder (November 16, 1871 – June 5, 1936), commonly known as Jack Ryder, was an American college football player and coach and sportswriter. He served as the second head football coach and the first paid at Ohio State University, coaching from 1892 to 1895 and again in 1898, compiling a record of 22–22–2. Ryder was later a noted sportswriter for The Cincinnati Enquirer.

== Early years and playing career ==
Ryder was born in Oberlin, Ohio in 1871, but moved with his family as a youth to New England. He attended Phillips Academy in Andover, Massachusetts, where he learned the game of American football. In 1888 Ryder returned to Oberlin to attend Oberlin College. He introduced the game to that school, and soon began to pressure the school administration to allow the Oberlin students to form an intercollegiate team. The pressure ultimately paid off in the Fall of 1890.

Before the Oberlin team would play a game, however, Ryder decided to transfer to Williams College in Williamstown, Massachusetts. He later played for the Williams team. He graduated in 1892.

== Coaching career ==
In the Fall of 1892, Ryder came to Columbus, Ohio to teach at Columbus Academy. He was also offered a job as the head coach of the Ohio State University football team. He was the first coach hired at the University. The Ohio State Buckeyes football team had previously been coached by Alexander Lilley, but Lilley had worked as a volunteer. In his first season, Ryder was paid $15 per week for a season total of $150.

Ryder led Ohio State to its first winning season. He introduced the concepts of closed practice and a training table. He also introduced a formation known as the Ryder Wedge, which was a variation of a wedge formation he had used at Williams College. In Ryder's first season, Ohio State outscored their opponents 242 to 14 in their five wins, and were outscored 130 to 18 in their three losses. Ryder stayed with Ohio State from 1892 until 1895.

During this time Ryder became proprietor of Columbus Academy. Later, during the Spanish–American War, Ryder saw service with the Ohio Cavalry. Following the war, he returned to Columbus and served one more year, 1898, as the Ohio State coach.

== Sportswriting career ==
Ryder then landed a job at the Columbus newspaper, the Ohio State Journal, and became a successful sportswriter. In 1905, he was offered a job with The Cincinnati Enquirer. Ryder replaced Charles Webb Murphy as The Cincinnati Enquirer's sportswriter, and was a fixture at that newspaper for more than 30 years. While with the Enquirer, Ryder usually covered the Cincinnati Reds baseball team.

In 1919, Ryder helped give the nickname to the University of Cincinnati sports teams, the Bearcats. Cincinnati's football team had five years earlier fielded a star fullback named Leonard K. "Teddy" Baehr. In a 1914 game against Kentucky, the Cincinnati fans cheered, "They may be Wildcats, but we have a Baehr-cat on our side." In 1919, Ryder revived the nickname and attributed it to the entire team. The name stuck and was soon adopted by the University.

As The Cincinnati Enquirer sportswriter, Ryder was a voter for the Most Valuable Player award for baseball's National League. He was one of eight American sportswriters, one from each National League city, who voted for the award. In 1924, St. Louis Cardinals second baseman Rogers Hornsby batted .424. Ryder did not give Hornsby a single vote in any of the ten spots on his ballot because he considered Hornsby a selfish player. Ryder was quoted as saying: "I will concede Hornsby is a most valuable player to himself, but not to his team. On that basis I couldn't give him a solitary vote." Brooklyn Dodgers pitcher Dazzy Vance won the award.

Ryder retired from The Cincinnati Enquirer in June 1936. Soon after, he died of a heart attack in the Cincinnati neighborhood of Avondale.

== Head coaching record ==
Year	Team	Overall	Conference	Standing	Bowl/playoffs
Ohio State Buckeyes (Independent) (1892–1895)
1892	Ohio State	5–3			
1893	Ohio State	4–5			
1894	Ohio State	6–5			
1895	Ohio State	4–4–2			
Ohio State Buckeyes (Independent) (1898)
1898	Ohio State	3–5			
Ohio State:		22–22–2			
Total:		22–22–2			
