= 1895 Cincinnati football team =

American college football season

1895 Cincinnati football
- Conference: Independent
- Record: 3–3
- Head coach: W. Durant Berry (2nd season)
- Captain: Randolph Matthews
- Home stadium: League Park

1895 Midwestern college football independents records
	Conf.			Overall
Team	W	L	T	W		L		T
Miami (OH)		–		3	–	0	–	0
Carthage		–		2	–	0	–	0
Washington University		–		2	–	0	–	0
Michigan		–		8	–	1	–	0
Chicago		–		10	–	3	–	0
Wittenberg		–		5	–	2	–	0
Minnesota		–		7	–	3	–	0
Wisconsin		–		5	–	2	–	1
Wabash		–		6	–	3	–	0
Baldwin–Wallace		–		3	–	1	–	0
Notre Dame		–		3	–	1	–	0
Illinois		–		4	–	2	–	1
Buchtel		–		3	–	2	–	0
College of Emporia		–		3	–	2	–	0
Doane		–		3	–	2	–	0
Chicago P&S		–		3	–	2	–	1
Purdue		–		4	–	3	–	0
Indiana		–		4	–	3	–	1
Northwestern		–		6	–	5	–	0
Butler		–		2	–	2	–	0
Cincinnati		–		3	–	3	–	0
Kalamazoo		–		1	–	1	–	0
Michigan State Normal		–		3	–	3	–	0
North Dakota Agricultural		–		1	–	1	–	0
North Dakota		–		1	–	1	–	0
Ohio State		–		4	–	4	–	2
Iowa Agricultural		–		3	–	4	–	0
Ohio		–		2	–	3	–	0
Rush-Lake Forest		–		4	–	6	–	0
Ohio Wesleyan		–		2	–	4	–	1
Haskell		–		1	–	2	–	0
Iowa State Normal		–		1	–	2	–	0
Lake Forest		–		1	–	2	–	0
Northwestern Law		–		1	–	2	–	0
Drake		–		1	–	4	–	0

The 1895 Cincinnati football team was an American football team that represented the University of Cincinnati as an independent during the 1895 college football season. Led by W. Durant Berry in his second and final season as head coach, Cincinnati compiled a record of 3–3. Randolph Matthews was the team captain. The team played home games at League Park in Cincinnati.

== Schedule ==
Date	Opponent	Site	Result	Attendance	Source
October 12	Kenyon	Cincinnati, OH	W 16–4	1,500	
October 19	at Duquesne Country and Athletic Club	Exposition Park; Allegheny City, PA	L 0–26	200–300	
October 26	Earlham	Cincinnati, OH	W 26–0		
November 9	Ohio State	League Park; Cincinnati, OH	L 0–4	200	
November 16	Miami (OH)	League Park; Cincinnati, OH (rivalry)	L 0–12		
November 28	Marietta	League Park; Cincinnati, OH	W 6–0	10,000	
