= 1895 Rush–Lake Forest football team =

American collegiate football team

1895 Rush–Lake Forest football
- Conference: Independent
- Record: 4–6
- Head coach: Herb Alward (1st season)
- Captain: Marion Woolsey (left tackle)

1895 Midwestern college football independents records
	Conf.			Overall
Team	W	L	T	W		L		T
Miami (OH)		–		3	–	0	–	0
Carthage		–		2	–	0	–	0
Washington University		–		2	–	0	–	0
Michigan		–		8	–	1	–	0
Chicago		–		10	–	3	–	0
Wittenberg		–		5	–	2	–	0
Minnesota		–		7	–	3	–	0
Wisconsin		–		5	–	2	–	1
Wabash		–		6	–	3	–	0
Baldwin–Wallace		–		3	–	1	–	0
Notre Dame		–		3	–	1	–	0
Illinois		–		4	–	2	–	1
Buchtel		–		3	–	2	–	0
College of Emporia		–		3	–	2	–	0
Doane		–		3	–	2	–	0
Chicago P&S		–		3	–	2	–	1
Purdue		–		4	–	3	–	0
Indiana		–		4	–	3	–	1
Northwestern		–		6	–	5	–	0
Butler		–		2	–	2	–	0
Cincinnati		–		3	–	3	–	0
Kalamazoo		–		1	–	1	–	0
Michigan State Normal		–		3	–	3	–	0
North Dakota Agricultural		–		1	–	1	–	0
North Dakota		–		1	–	1	–	0
Ohio State		–		4	–	4	–	2
Iowa Agricultural		–		3	–	4	–	0
Ohio		–		2	–	3	–	0
Rush-Lake Forest		–		4	–	6	–	0
Ohio Wesleyan		–		2	–	4	–	1
Haskell		–		1	–	2	–	0
Iowa State Normal		–		1	–	2	–	0
Lake Forest		–		1	–	2	–	0
Northwestern Law		–		1	–	2	–	0
Drake		–		1	–	4	–	0

The 1895 Rush–Lake Forest football team was an American football team that represented Rush Medical College and Lake Forest University during the 1895 college football season. The team compiled a 4–6 record, shut out three opponents (while being the recipient of a shutout five times), and was outscored by their opponents by a total of 182 to 67. They are noteworthy in college football for becoming one of, if not the only example of a mid-season consolidation of two distinct football programs into a single team.

Before the merger of each school's football program, Rush Medical and Lake Forest both had plans for a regular season and schedule, which included many of the same opponents, such as Chicago, Beloit, Chicago Athletic Association, and the Armour Institute of Technology. The idea of a merger between the two teams was first proposed by G. W. King on or around October 10, 1895, and was quickly adopted on October 12 with the help of J. D. Nary and J. H. Rice. The consolidation of both programs was easier than would otherwise be expected, given that Rush Medical was already affiliated with Lake Forest, the former being an affiliate graduate college of the latter. The plan was for Rush Medical, which had attained several experienced football players from their successful 1894 season, to forgo their men to Lake Forest, in return for the university's superior schedule, which included regional powerhouses Wisconsin, Michigan, and Notre Dame. The law programs of Chicago University and Lake Forest were also combed for possible talent. With the consolidation, the combined team hoped to stand a better chance against the more accomplished Midwestern football programs. Unfortunately, this strategy did not seem to play out for either team, and the Rush–Lake Forest experiment lost the majority of their remaining contests for the 1895 season.

== Pre-merger schedules ==
=== Rush Medical schedule ===
The original captain for Rush Medical was Mr. Sager, a longtime fullback for the Chicago Athletic Association, and the coach was Mr. Searie. Many of the men on the Rush Medical roster had previous experience on collegiate and semi-professional teams, which included the Chicago Athletic Association, Purdue, Grinnell, Lake Forest, Washington &Jefferson, Kalamazoo, Minnesota, and Illinois. The team manager was H. C. Parks.

Date	Time	Opponent	Site	Result	Source
October 5	3:00 p.m.	at Chicago Athletic Association	CAA Field; Chicago, IL	L 0–30	
October 9		West Division High School		Unknown	
October 12		at Chicago	Marshall Field; Chicago, IL	Cancelled	
November 6		at Armour	CAA Field; Chicago, IL	Cancelled	
		Northwestern		Cancelled	
		Beloit		Cancelled	
		Pittsburgh Athletic Club		Cancelled	
		Boston Athletic Association		Cancelled	

=== Lake Forest schedule ===
Lake Forest was originally coached by Vic Harding, and kept their captain Marion Woolsey after the merger. The Foresters compiled a 1–2 record, and were outscored 66 to 6 by their opponents. The reason for this confusion lies with the October 12 contest against Wisconsin, as the game was originally recognized as a Lake Forest game (as opposed to Rush–Lake Forest). By October 12 however, Rush Medical football players were already practicing with the Lake Forest eleven, and the team that played against the Badgers was composed of men from both teams, seven from Rush Medical and four from Lake Forest. Lake Forest also does not recognize this contest in their official season records, and so it is safe to retract this contest from Lake Forest's individual schedule.

Date	Time	Opponent	Site	Result	Source
September 28	3:00 p.m.	George Williams	Lake Forest, IL	W 6–0	
October 5		at Chicago	Marshall Field; Chicago, IL	L 0–52	
October 9		at Armour	CAA Field; Chicago, IL	L 0–14	
November 23		Grinnell		Cancelled	

== Rush–Lake Forest schedule ==
Date	Time	Opponent	Site	Result	Attendance	Source
October 12		at Wisconsin	Randall Stadium; Madison, WI	L 5–26		
October 19	3:30 p.m.	at Illinois Cycling Club	Douglas Park; Chicago, IL	W 10–6		
October 22	4:20 p.m.	at Chicago Athletic Association	CAA Field; Chicago, IL	L 0–30		
October 26		at Michigan	Regents Field; Ann Arbor, MI	L 0–40	400	
October 28		at Michigan Military Academy	Detroit, MI	W 16–0		
October 31	3:30 p.m.	at Northwestern	Athletic Field; Evanston, IL	L 0–24	2,000	
November 2		at Illinois	Illinois Field; Champaign, IL	L 0–38		
November 14		at Notre Dame	Brownson Hall field; Notre Dame, IN	Cancelled		
November 16		at Wabash	Crawfordsville, IN	W 26–0		
November 22		Carroll (WI)	Chicago, IL	W 10–0		
November 23		Monmouth (IL)		Cancelled		
November 25		Knox (IL)		Cancelled		
November 28		vs. Beloit	Elgin, IL	L 0–18	600	

== Rush–Lake Forest second team schedule ==
As part of the consolidation on October 12, a second team was formed to practice against the Varsity team in between match days. The seconds were captained by Mr. Stoops, a left tackle, and compiled (at least) a 0–2 record against regional academy teams and other collegiate secondaries.

Date	Opponent	Site	Result	Source
October 17	Armour seconds	Chicago, IL	L 14–16 or 12–16	
October 23	Evanston Academy		Unknown	
November 2	at Morgan Park Academy	Morgan Park, IL	L 0–34	
