= Recreation Park (Columbus) =

Baseball ground in Columbus, Ohio

- Interactive map of Recreation Park
- Location: Columbus, Ohio, United States
- Coordinates: 39°56′43″N 82°59′22″W Recreation Park (II); 39°57′23″N 82°58′54″W Recreation Park (I)
- Capacity: 6,500
- Surface: Grass

Tenants
- Recreation Park (I); Columbus Buckeyes (AA) (1883–1884); Recreation Park (II); Columbus Solons (AA) (1889–1891); Ohio State Buckeyes football (1890–1897)

Recreation Park is the name of two different former baseball grounds located in Columbus, Ohio.

Recreation Park I was located on the south side of Mound Street and the east side of Parsons Avenue. This was the home field for the Columbus Buckeyes of the American Association for the 1883 and 1884 seasons. The site is currently occupied by ramps for Interstate Highway 70.

Recreation Park II was located in the Schumacher Place neighborhood, and was bound by Schiller (now East Whittier) Street to the south (third base); the western edge of Jaeger Street to the west; Ebner Street to the east (first base); and East Kossuth Street to the north (right field). This was the home field for the Columbus Solons of the American Association from 1889 through 1891. The bulk of the site is now occupied by a vacant Giant Eagle and is bisected by South Grant Avenue. The remaining parts of the original large block are residences.

On November 1, 1890 the Ohio State University football team played their first home game at Recreation Park (II). A historical marker was put up at the former site of the field on October 20, 2006 to commemorate the first Ohio State home game, a 64–0 loss to Wooster.
