= 1893 Butler Christians football team =

American college football season

1893 Butler Christians football
- Conference: Indiana Intercollegiate Athletic Association
- Record: 4–2 (2–2 IIAA)
- Head coach: None
- Captain: Alfred H. Somerville

1893 Indiana Intercollegiate Athletic Association football standings
	Conf.					Overall
Team	W		L		T	W		L		T
Purdue $	4	–	0	–	0	5	–	2	–	1
DePauw	3	–	1	–	0	6	–	3	–	0
Butler	2	–	2	–	0	4	–	2	–	0
Wabash	1	–	3	–	0	2	–	4	–	0
Indiana	0	–	4	–	0	1	–	4	–	1
$ – Conference champion

The 1893 Butler Christians football team represented Butler University during the 1893 college football season. The team compiled a record of 4–2. Alfred H. Somerville was the team captain. The team began the season with 23 players.

== Schedule ==
Date	Opponent	Site	Result	Attendance
October 14	at DePauw	Greencastle, IN	L 6–20	
October 21	at Purdue	Stuart Field; West Lafayette, IN	L 0–96	1,200
October 28	Indiana	Athletic Park; Indianapolis, IN	W 38–0	
November 4	Deaf and Dumb Institute*	Irvington neighborhood; Indianapolis, IN	W 16–0	
November 11	Zig-Zags*	East Ohio Street Park; Indianapolis, IN	W 52–0	
November 19	at Wabash	Crawfordsville, IN	W 28–24	
*Non-conference game

== Game summaries ==
On October 14, 1893, Butler lost to DePauw, 20–6, at Greencastle, Indiana. The game was called due to darkness. Butler's starting lineup against DePauw was Williams at quarterback, Somerville at right halfback, Baker at left halfback, A. Hall at fullback, Stevenson at right end, Lister at right tackle, Anderson at right guard, Henry at center, Locy at left guard, Stevens at left tackle, and Scott at left end.

On October 21, 1893, Butler lost to Purdue, 96–0, before a crowd of 1,200 at Lafayette, Indiana. Butler's starting lineup against Purdue was Burford at quarterback, Somerville at right halfback, Williams at left halfback, Hall at fullback, Parker at right end, Taylor at right guard, Lister at right tackle, Henry at center, Lackey at left guard, Payne at left tackle, and Scott at left end.

On October 28, 1893, Butler defeated Indiana, 38–0, at Athletic Park in Indianapolis. Butler's lineup against Indiana was Burford at quarterback, Somerville at right halfback, Hall at left halfback, Scott at fullback, Parker at right end, Lister at right tackle, Taylor at right guard, Barnett at center, Losey at left guard, Payne at left tackle, and Moore at left end.

On November 4, Butler defeated the team from the Deaf and Dumb Institute by a 16–0 score. The game was played in the Irvington neighborhood of Indianapolis.

On November 11, Butler defeated the Zig-Zag bicycle eleven by a 52–0 score in a game played at the East Ohio Street Park in Indianapolis.

On November 19, Butler defeated Wabash, 28–24, on the Wabash campus in Crawfordsville, Indiana. The game lasted one hour and 15 minutes, concluding at 2:40 p.m. Butler's starting lineup against Wabash was Williams at quarterback, Baker at right halfback, Somerville at left halfback, Hall at fullback, Scott at left end, Stevens at left tackle, Lecoy at left guard, Henry at center, Anderson at right guard, Lister at right tackle, and Stevenson at right end.

After witnessing the DePauw–Wabash game, played one week earlier, Dr. H. A. Turker, the pastor at the Crawfordsville Methodist Church, wrote at length condemning the game as a disgrace. He opened his comments as follows: "We thought at first it was barbarous, then we concluded it would be a slander to the barbarians to compare a football game to their sports. . . . We have seen a pack of dogs fighting for a rotten bone, of which we were reminded at the football game. A football game, as now played, is a disgrace." He closed: "This evil has surely gone far enough. Let every man speak who opposes this brutality."
