= 1903 Cincinnati football team =

American college football season

1903 Cincinnati football
- Conference: Independent
- Record: 1–8
- Head coach: Anthony Chez (2nd season)
- Captain: Harry Box
- Home stadium: Burnet Woods

1903 Midwestern college football independents records
	Conf.			Overall
Team	W	L	T	W		L		T
Nebraska		–		11	–	0	–	0
North Dakota		–		7	–	0	–	0
Central Michigan		–		6	–	0	–	0
Notre Dame		–		8	–	0	–	1
Iowa State		–		8	–	1	–	0
Marquette		–		7	–	1	–	0
Lake Forest		–		6	–	1	–	0
North Dakota Agricultural		–		5	–	1	–	0
Haskell		–		7	–	2	–	0
St. Xavier		–		7	–	2	–	0
Fairmount		–		6	–	2	–	0
Wabash		–		9	–	3	–	0
Wittenberg		–		5	–	2	–	1
Doane		–		2	–	1	–	0
Northern Illinois State		–		4	–	2	–	0
American Medical		–		6	–	3	–	0
Kansas		–		6	–	3	–	0
Drake		–		5	–	3	–	0
Kirksville Osteopaths		–		5	–	3	–	0
Iowa State Normal		–		4	–	3	–	1
Ohio Medical		–		5	–	4	–	0
Lincoln (MO)		–		1	–	1	–	0
Michigan State Normal		–		4	–	4	–	0
Washington University		–		4	–	4	–	2
Heidelberg		–		3	–	4	–	2
Kansas State		–		3	–	4	–	1
Detroit College		–		3	–	4	–	0
Shurtleff		–		2	–	4	–	1
Ohio		–		2	–	4	–	0
South Dakota Agricultural		–		1	–	2	–	0
Mount Union		–		2	–	5	–	1
DePauw		–		2	–	6	–	1
Miami (OH)		–		1	–	4	–	0
Missouri		–		1	–	7	–	1
Western Illinois		–		0	–	3	–	1
Cincinnati		–		1	–	8	–	0
Baldwin–Wallace		–		0	–	1	–	0
Buchtel		–		0	–	2	–	0
Butler		–		0	–	3	–	0
Chicago P&S		–		0	–	4	–	0

The 1903 Cincinnati football team was an American football team that represented the University of Cincinnati as an independent during the 1903 college football season. Led by Anthony Chez in his second and final season as head coach, Cincinnati compiled a record of 1–8. Harry Box was the team captain. The team played home games at Burnet Woods in Cincinnati.

== Schedule ==
Date	Time	Opponent	Site	Result	Attendance	Source
October 3		Hanover	Burnet Woods; Cincinnati, OH	W 28–6		
October 10		at Wittenberg	Zimmerman Field; Springfield, OH	L 0–6	600	
October 17	2:30 p.m.	Miami (OH)	Burnet Woods; Cincinnati, OH (Victory Bell)	L 0–15		
October 24	2:30 p.m.	Northwestern	Burnet Woods; Cincinnati, OH	L 0–35		
October 31	3:00 p.m.	Kenyon	Burnet Woods; Cincinnati, OH	L 0–18		
November 7		at Earlham	Reid Field; Richmond, IN	L 0–11		
November 14		Alumni	Burnet Woods; Cincinnati, OH	L 0–6		
November 21		at Washington University	League Park; St. Louis, MO	L 11–23	1,000	
November 26	2:30 p.m.	Avondale Athletic Club	Burnet Woods; Cincinnati, OH	L 0–22	4,000	
