= 1903 Shurtleff football team =

American college football season

1903 Shurtleff football
- Conference: Independent
- Record: 2–4–1
- Captains: E. Swain (quarterback); Louis Haight (fullback)
- Home stadium: Sportsman's Park

1903 Midwestern college football independents records
	Conf.			Overall
Team	W	L	T	W		L		T
Nebraska		–		11	–	0	–	0
North Dakota		–		7	–	0	–	0
Central Michigan		–		6	–	0	–	0
Notre Dame		–		8	–	0	–	1
Iowa State		–		8	–	1	–	0
Marquette		–		7	–	1	–	0
Lake Forest		–		6	–	1	–	0
North Dakota Agricultural		–		5	–	1	–	0
Haskell		–		7	–	2	–	0
St. Xavier		–		7	–	2	–	0
Fairmount		–		6	–	2	–	0
Wabash		–		9	–	3	–	0
Wittenberg		–		5	–	2	–	1
Doane		–		2	–	1	–	0
Northern Illinois State		–		4	–	2	–	0
American Medical		–		6	–	3	–	0
Kansas		–		6	–	3	–	0
Drake		–		5	–	3	–	0
Kirksville Osteopaths		–		5	–	3	–	0
Iowa State Normal		–		4	–	3	–	1
Ohio Medical		–		5	–	4	–	0
Lincoln (MO)		–		1	–	1	–	0
Michigan State Normal		–		4	–	4	–	0
Washington University		–		4	–	4	–	2
Heidelberg		–		3	–	4	–	2
Kansas State		–		3	–	4	–	1
Detroit College		–		3	–	4	–	0
Shurtleff		–		2	–	4	–	1
Ohio		–		2	–	4	–	0
South Dakota Agricultural		–		1	–	2	–	0
Mount Union		–		2	–	5	–	1
DePauw		–		2	–	6	–	1
Miami (OH)		–		1	–	4	–	0
Missouri		–		1	–	7	–	1
Western Illinois		–		0	–	3	–	1
Cincinnati		–		1	–	8	–	0
Baldwin–Wallace		–		0	–	1	–	0
Buchtel		–		0	–	2	–	0
Butler		–		0	–	3	–	0
Chicago P&S		–		0	–	4	–	0

The 1903 Shurtleff football team represented Shurtleff College as an independent during the 1903 college football season. The team played at Sportsman's Park in Alton, Illinois. The field was owned by the Western Military Academy.

== Schedule ==
Date	Time	Opponent	Site	Result	Source
September 26	3:10 p.m.	St. Louis High School	Sportsman's Park; Alton, IL	L 0–10	
October 1		at Illinois College	Jacksonville, IL	L 0–6	
October 10		at McKendree	Lebanon, IL	L 6–51	
October 17		Washington University	Sportsman's Park; Alton, IL	L 0–28	
October 24		Smith Academy	Sportsman's Park; Alton, IL	T 6–6	
October 31		Marion-Sims College of Medicine	Sportsman's Park; Alton, IL	W 29–0	
November 7		St. Louis Manual Training School	Sportsman's Park; Alton, IL	W 30–0 or 24–0	
