= 1903 Lake Forest Foresters football team =

American college football season

1903 Lake Forest football
- Conference: Independent
- Record: 6–1
- Head coach: Clarence Herschberger (2nd season)

1903 Midwestern college football independents records
	Conf.			Overall
Team	W	L	T	W		L		T
Nebraska		–		11	–	0	–	0
North Dakota		–		7	–	0	–	0
Central Michigan		–		6	–	0	–	0
Notre Dame		–		8	–	0	–	1
Iowa State		–		8	–	1	–	0
Marquette		–		7	–	1	–	0
Lake Forest		–		6	–	1	–	0
North Dakota Agricultural		–		5	–	1	–	0
Haskell		–		7	–	2	–	0
St. Xavier		–		7	–	2	–	0
Fairmount		–		6	–	2	–	0
Wabash		–		9	–	3	–	0
Wittenberg		–		5	–	2	–	1
Doane		–		2	–	1	–	0
Northern Illinois State		–		4	–	2	–	0
American Medical		–		6	–	3	–	0
Kansas		–		6	–	3	–	0
Drake		–		5	–	3	–	0
Kirksville Osteopaths		–		5	–	3	–	0
Iowa State Normal		–		4	–	3	–	1
Ohio Medical		–		5	–	4	–	0
Lincoln (MO)		–		1	–	1	–	0
Michigan State Normal		–		4	–	4	–	0
Washington University		–		4	–	4	–	2
Heidelberg		–		3	–	4	–	2
Kansas State		–		3	–	4	–	1
Detroit College		–		3	–	4	–	0
Shurtleff		–		2	–	4	–	1
Ohio		–		2	–	4	–	0
South Dakota Agricultural		–		1	–	2	–	0
Mount Union		–		2	–	5	–	1
DePauw		–		2	–	6	–	1
Miami (OH)		–		1	–	4	–	0
Missouri		–		1	–	7	–	1
Western Illinois		–		0	–	3	–	1
Cincinnati		–		1	–	8	–	0
Baldwin–Wallace		–		0	–	1	–	0
Buchtel		–		0	–	2	–	0
Butler		–		0	–	3	–	0
Chicago P&S		–		0	–	4	–	0

The 1903 Lake Forest football team was an American football team that represented Lake Forest College in the 1903 college football season. In Clarence Herschberger's 2nd season as head coach, the Foresters compiled a 6–1 record, and outscored their opponents 103 to 67. Lake Forest's only loss was against a Notre Dame team that had successfully executed an undefeated and unscored upon season, compiling an 8–0–1 record and outscored their opponents 291 to 0.

== Schedule ==
Date	Opponent	Site	Result
October 3	Waukegan Athletic Association	Lake Forest, IL	W 10–0
October 10	Notre Dame	Cartier Field; Notre Dame, IN	L 0–28
October 17	Northwestern Military Academy	Lake Forest, IL	W 30–5
October 24	North Central (IL)	Naperville, IL	W 12–11
November 7	DePauw	Greencastle, IN	W 5–0
November 14	Chicago Dental	Lake Forest, Il	W 24–11
December 5	Monmouth (IL)	Monmouth, IL	W 22–12
