= American Medical football =

American college football team

The American Medical football team represented the American College of Medicine and Surgery in college football from 1901 to 1905. The college was based out of Chicago, Illinois.

== 1901 ==
1901 Chicago Eclectic Medical football
- Conference: Independent
- Record: 0–3

1901 Midwestern college football independents records
	Conf.			Overall
Team	W	L	T	W		L		T
Saint Louis		–		10	–	0	–	0
North Dakota Agricultural		–		7	–	0	–	0
Marquette		–		4	–	0	–	1
Northern Illinois State		–		6	–	1	–	0
Notre Dame		–		8	–	1	–	1
Ohio Wesleyan		–		8	–	2	–	0
Kirksville Osteopaths		–		10	–	3	–	0
Nebraska		–		6	–	2	–	0
Ohio		–		6	–	1	–	2
Doane		–		3	–	1	–	0
Haskell		–		6	–	2	–	0
Lake Forest		–		10	–	5	–	0
Ohio State		–		5	–	3	–	1
Washington University		–		5	–	3	–	1
Ohio Medical		–		5	–	3	–	1
Iowa State Normal		–		5	–	3	–	2
South Dakota Agricultural		–		3	–	2	–	0
Beloit		–		5	–	3	–	3
Washburn		–		3	–	2	–	3
Carthage		–		1	–	1	–	0
Drake		–		4	–	4	–	0
Detroit College		–		3	–	3	–	0
Mount Union		–		5	–	5	–	1
Wittenberg		–		4	–	4	–	0
Kansas State		–		3	–	4	–	1
Iowa State		–		2	–	6	–	2
Kansas		–		3	–	5	–	2
Wabash		–		4	–	7	–	0
Fairmount		–		3	–	6	–	0
Heidelberg		–		1	–	3	–	1
Miami (OH)		–		1	–	3	–	1
Cincinnati		–		1	–	4	–	1
Case		–		2	–	7	–	0
Missouri		–		1	–	6	–	1
Butler		–		0	–	1	–	0
Chicago Eclectic Medical		–		0	–	3	–	0

The 1901 Chicago Eclectic Medical football team, was an American football team that represented the Chicago Eclectic Medical College, known a year later as American College of Medicine and Surgery in the 1901 college football season. In their first year of play, the medics compiled a 0–3 record and surrendered 78 points while not scoring a single point themselves.

=== Schedule ===
Date	Time	Opponent	Site	Result	Source
October 5	3:00 p.m.	Kensington Athletic Club	Pullman; Chicago, IL	Unknown	
October 12		at St. Charles Athletic Club	St. Charles, IL	L 0–17	
October 16		at Morgan Park Academy	Morgan Park; Chicago, IL	L 0–29	
October 19		at Notre Dame	Cartier Field; Notre Dame, IN	L 0–32	

=== Roster ===
This roster was compiled from accounts of the Notre Dame and St. Charles Athletic Club football games.

- McMahon, right end
- Koehler, right end
- Hart, right tackle
- Keeber, right guard
- Clingsmith, right guard
- Gallear, center
- Sheets, left guard
- Hayward, left tackle
- Linberg, left end and left tackle
- Cone, left end
- Cooper, right halfback
- Smith, left halfback
- Neville, quarterback
- Quille, quarterback
- Bunch, fullback

== 1902 ==
1902 American Medical football
- Conference: Independent
- Record: 1–1

1902 Midwestern college football independents records
	Conf.			Overall
Team	W	L	T	W		L		T
Nebraska		–		9	–	0	–	0
South Dakota		–		9	–	0	–	0
North Dakota Agricultural		–		4	–	0	–	0
Central Michigan		–		4	–	0	–	0
Ohio Medical		–		9	–	1	–	0
Marquette		–		6	–	1	–	1
Knox		–		9	–	2	–	0
Northern Illinois State		–		5	–	1	–	1
Haskell		–		8	–	2	–	1
Notre Dame		–		6	–	2	–	1
Drake		–		5	–	2	–	1
Lincoln (MO)		–		2	–	1	–	0
Mount Union		–		6	–	3	–	0
Iowa State		–		6	–	3	–	1
Carthage		–		2	–	1	–	1
Cincinnati		–		4	–	2	–	2
Missouri		–		5	–	3	–	0
Miami (OH)		–		5	–	3	–	1
Kansas		–		6	–	4	–	0
South Dakota Agricultural		–		3	–	2	–	0
Fairmount		–		4	–	3	–	1
Detroit College		–		3	–	3	–	0
Lake Forest		–		4	–	4	–	1
Lincoln (MO)		–		1	–	1	–	0
Western Illinois		–		2	–	2	–	0
Wittenberg		–		3	–	4	–	2
Washburn		–		3	–	4	–	0
Doane		–		2	–	3	–	0
Heidelberg		–		3	–	5	–	1
Wabash		–		2	–	4	–	2
Buchtel		–		2	–	5	–	0
Washington University		–		2	–	6	–	1
Butler		–		1	–	3	–	0
Kansas State		–		2	–	6	–	0
Michigan State Normal		–		1	–	5	–	1
Iowa State Normal		–		1	–	6	–	1
Ohio		–		0	–	5	–	1

The 1902 American Medical football team was an American football team that represented the American College of Medicine and Surgery in the 1902 college football season.

=== Schedule ===
Date	Opponent	Site	Result	Source
October 4	at St. Viator	Bourbonnais, IL	W 5–0	
November 15	at Notre Dame	Cartier Field; Notre Dame, IN	L 0–92	

=== Roster ===
This roster was compiled by an account of the Notre Dame game.

- Madernack, left end
- Clark, left tackle
- Sheets, left guard
- Laws, center
- Klingermuth, right guard
- Limberg, right tackle
- Stevens, right end
- Converse, quarterback
- Mitchell, left halfback
- Haywood, right halfback
- Butch, fullback

== 1903 ==
1903 American Medical football
- Conference: Independent
- Record: 6–3

1903 Midwestern college football independents records
	Conf.			Overall
Team	W	L	T	W		L		T
Nebraska		–		11	–	0	–	0
North Dakota		–		7	–	0	–	0
Central Michigan		–		6	–	0	–	0
Notre Dame		–		8	–	0	–	1
Iowa State		–		8	–	1	–	0
Marquette		–		7	–	1	–	0
Lake Forest		–		6	–	1	–	0
North Dakota Agricultural		–		5	–	1	–	0
Haskell		–		7	–	2	–	0
St. Xavier		–		7	–	2	–	0
Fairmount		–		6	–	2	–	0
Wabash		–		9	–	3	–	0
Wittenberg		–		5	–	2	–	1
Doane		–		2	–	1	–	0
Northern Illinois State		–		4	–	2	–	0
American Medical		–		6	–	3	–	0
Kansas		–		6	–	3	–	0
Drake		–		5	–	3	–	0
Kirksville Osteopaths		–		5	–	3	–	0
Iowa State Normal		–		4	–	3	–	1
Ohio Medical		–		5	–	4	–	0
Lincoln (MO)		–		1	–	1	–	0
Michigan State Normal		–		4	–	4	–	0
Washington University		–		4	–	4	–	2
Heidelberg		–		3	–	4	–	2
Kansas State		–		3	–	4	–	1
Detroit College		–		3	–	4	–	0
Shurtleff		–		2	–	4	–	1
Ohio		–		2	–	4	–	0
South Dakota Agricultural		–		1	–	2	–	0
Mount Union		–		2	–	5	–	1
DePauw		–		2	–	6	–	1
Miami (OH)		–		1	–	4	–	0
Missouri		–		1	–	7	–	1
Western Illinois		–		0	–	3	–	1
Cincinnati		–		1	–	8	–	0
Baldwin–Wallace		–		0	–	1	–	0
Buchtel		–		0	–	2	–	0
Butler		–		0	–	3	–	0
Chicago P&S		–		0	–	4	–	0

The 1903 American Medical football team was an American football team that represented the American College of Medicine and Surgery in the 1903 college football season.

=== Schedule ===
Date	Opponent	Site	Result	Source
	Kensington Athletic Club		W 6–5	
October 17	at St. Viator	Bourbonnais, IL	W 6–0	
October 24	at Notre Dame	Cartier Field; Notre Dame, IN	L 0–52	
October 31	at North-Western College	Naperville, IL	L 0–6	
	Chicago Veterinary		W 18–2	
	Northwestern Medical		W 39–5	
	Fort Sheridan		W 33–0	
	Chicago Dental		L 6–23	
	Elgin Academy		W 6–0	

== 1904 ==
1904 American Medical football
- Conference: Independent
- Record: 0–3

1904 Midwestern college football independents records
	Conf.			Overall
Team	W	L	T	W		L		T
Saint Louis		–		10	–	0	–	0
Bethany (KS)		–		7	–	0	–	0
Northern Illinois State		–		5	–	0	–	0
Cape Girardeau Normal		–		2	–	0	–	0
Haskell		–		8	–	1	–	0
Cincinnati		–		7	–	1	–	0
Butler		–		6	–	1	–	0
Doane		–		5	–	1	–	0
Kansas		–		8	–	1	–	1
DePauw		–		8	–	2	–	0
Iowa State		–		7	–	2	–	0
Ohio Northern		–		7	–	2	–	1
Michigan State Normal		–		6	–	2	–	0
Wittenberg		–		6	–	2	–	0
Marquette		–		5	–	2	–	0
Nebraska		–		7	–	3	–	0
Detroit College		–		4	–	2	–	0
South Dakota State		–		4	–	2	–	1
Notre Dame		–		5	–	3	–	0
Iowa State Normal		–		5	–	3	–	1
Western Illinois		–		6	–	4	–	0
Heidelberg		–		6	–	4	–	1
Drake		–		5	–	4	–	0
Carthage		–		0	–	0	–	2
North Dakota Agricultural		–		3	–	3	–	0
Wabash		–		4	–	4	–	0
Fairmount		–		4	–	5	–	0
Lake Forest		–		3	–	5	–	1
Ohio Medical		–		2	–	4	–	2
Washington University		–		4	–	7	–	0
Ohio		–		2	–	4	–	1
Missouri		–		3	–	6	–	0
Mount Union		–		2	–	6	–	0
Miami (OH)		–		1	–	5	–	0
Kansas State		–		1	–	6	–	0
American Medical		–		0	–	3	–	0

The 1904 American Medical football team was an American football team that represented the American College of Medicine and Surgery in the 1904 college football season.

=== Schedule ===
Date	Opponent	Site	Result	Attendance	Source
October 8	at Notre Dame	Cartier Field; South Bend, IN	L 0–44		
October 15	Woodlawn Country Club	Washington Park; Chicago, IL	L 0–5		
October 19	at Michigan	Regents Field; Ann Arbor, MI	L 0–72	1,100	

== 1905 ==
1905 American Medical football
- Conference: Independent
- Record: 0–2

1905 Midwestern college football independents records
	Conf.			Overall
Team	W	L	T	W		L		T
Lincoln (MO)		–		3	–	0	–	0
Detroit College		–		1	–	0	–	0
Kansas		–		10	–	1	–	0
Central Michigan		–		7	–	1	–	0
Doane		–		5	–	1	–	0
Nebraska		–		9	–	2	–	0
Saint Louis		–		7	–	2	–	0
Butler		–		7	–	2	–	1
Kansas State		–		6	–	2	–	0
Northern Illinois State		–		3	–	1	–	1
Carthage		–		4	–	2	–	0
Western Illinois		–		4	–	2	–	0
Iowa State		–		6	–	3	–	0
Washington University		–		7	–	3	–	2
Wittenberg		–		7	–	4	–	0
Heidelberg		–		6	–	4	–	0
Iowa State Normal		–		5	–	3	–	2
Cincinnati		–		5	–	3	–	0
Miami (OH)		–		4	–	3	–	0
Missouri		–		5	–	4	–	0
Notre Dame		–		5	–	4	–	0
Fairmount		–		5	–	4	–	1
Haskell		–		5	–	4	–	1
Lake Forest		–		6	–	5	–	0
Wabash		–		6	–	5	–	0
Drake		–		4	–	4	–	0
Michigan State Normal		–		4	–	4	–	0
Marquette		–		3	–	4	–	0
South Dakota State		–		2	–	3	–	0
Ohio		–		2	–	5	–	2
DePauw		–		3	–	6	–	0
Mount Union		–		2	–	6	–	0
North Dakota Agricultural		–		1	–	4	–	1
Baldwin–Wallace		–		0	–	1	–	0
Chicago P&S		–		0	–	1	–	0
St. Mary's (OH)		–		0	–	3	–	0

The 1905 American Medical football team was an American football team that represented the American College of Medicine and Surgery in the 1905 college football season. It is likely that American Medical played more contests, but no more against major college teams. In their single known major collegiate contest, American Medical suffered one of the most lopsided defeats in the history of college football, a 142–0 count against Notre Dame. This was the last year American Medical fielded a football team.

=== Schedule ===
Date	Opponent	Site	Result	Source
October 14	St. Viator	Bourbonnais, IL	L 0–69	
October 28	Notre Dame	Cartier Field; Notre Dame, IN	L 0–142	

=== Roster ===
- Behrendt, left end
- Irwin, left tackle
- Spar, left guard
- Eide, center
- Denny, right guard
- Bouley, right tackle
- Trombley, right end
- Wittenberg, quarterback
- Newman, left halfback, fullback
- B. Dean, right halfback
- B. Mooney, fullback, left halfback

=== Game summary ===
American Medical at Notre Dame

Team	1	2	Total
American Medical	0	0	0
• Notre Dame	121	21	142

- Date: October 28, 1905
- Location: Cartier Field
  South Bend, IN
- Elapsed time: 33 minutes
- Referee: Studebaker
