= Western Illinois Purple and Gold football, 1902–1909 =

American college football seasons

The Western Illinois Purple and Gold football program represented the Western Illinois State Normal School, also known as the Macomb State Normal School, later renamed Western Illinois University. This article covers the program's first eight years of intercollegiate football from 1902 to 1909.

During this period, the team's opponents included Carthage College (six games), Illinois State (five games), Quincy High School (four games), Lombard College (three games), Monmouth College (two games), Northern Illinois (two games), Kirksville State (two games), and Saint Alban's Military Academy (two games).

== 1902 ==
1902 Western Illinois Purple and Gold football
- Conference: Independent
- Record: 2–2
- Head coach: Unknown

1902 Midwestern college football independents records
	Conf.			Overall
Team	W	L	T	W		L		T
Nebraska		–		9	–	0	–	0
South Dakota		–		9	–	0	–	0
North Dakota Agricultural		–		4	–	0	–	0
Central Michigan		–		4	–	0	–	0
Ohio Medical		–		9	–	1	–	0
Marquette		–		6	–	1	–	1
Knox		–		9	–	2	–	0
Northern Illinois State		–		5	–	1	–	1
Haskell		–		8	–	2	–	1
Notre Dame		–		6	–	2	–	1
Drake		–		5	–	2	–	1
Lincoln (MO)		–		2	–	1	–	0
Mount Union		–		6	–	3	–	0
Iowa State		–		6	–	3	–	1
Carthage		–		2	–	1	–	1
Cincinnati		–		4	–	2	–	2
Missouri		–		5	–	3	–	0
Miami (OH)		–		5	–	3	–	1
Kansas		–		6	–	4	–	0
South Dakota Agricultural		–		3	–	2	–	0
Fairmount		–		4	–	3	–	1
Detroit College		–		3	–	3	–	0
Lake Forest		–		4	–	4	–	1
Lincoln (MO)		–		1	–	1	–	0
Western Illinois		–		2	–	2	–	0
Wittenberg		–		3	–	4	–	2
Washburn		–		3	–	4	–	0
Doane		–		2	–	3	–	0
Heidelberg		–		3	–	5	–	1
Wabash		–		2	–	4	–	2
Buchtel		–		2	–	5	–	0
Washington University		–		2	–	6	–	1
Butler		–		1	–	3	–	0
Kansas State		–		2	–	6	–	0
Michigan State Normal		–		1	–	5	–	1
Iowa State Normal		–		1	–	6	–	1
Ohio		–		0	–	5	–	1

It was previously believed that Western Illinois first fielded a football team in 1903. However, research by a WIU professor (John Hallwas) and an employee of the WIU archives (Kathy Nichols) established that Western Illinois fielded a team in 1902 that played four games and compiled a 2–2 record.

Date	Opponent	Site	Result	Source
	Western Illinois Normal & Business Institute		W 38–0	
	Quincy HS	Quincy, IL	L 0–16	
	"Macomb Normal"		W 18–5	
	Moline HS		L 5–35	

== 1903 ==
1903 Western Illinois Purple and Gold football
- Conference: Independent
- Record: 0–3–1
- Head coach: Unknown

1903 Midwestern college football independents records
	Conf.			Overall
Team	W	L	T	W		L		T
Nebraska		–		11	–	0	–	0
North Dakota		–		7	–	0	–	0
Central Michigan		–		6	–	0	–	0
Notre Dame		–		8	–	0	–	1
Iowa State		–		8	–	1	–	0
Marquette		–		7	–	1	–	0
Lake Forest		–		6	–	1	–	0
North Dakota Agricultural		–		5	–	1	–	0
Haskell		–		7	–	2	–	0
St. Xavier		–		7	–	2	–	0
Fairmount		–		6	–	2	–	0
Wabash		–		9	–	3	–	0
Wittenberg		–		5	–	2	–	1
Doane		–		2	–	1	–	0
Northern Illinois State		–		4	–	2	–	0
American Medical		–		6	–	3	–	0
Kansas		–		6	–	3	–	0
Drake		–		5	–	3	–	0
Kirksville Osteopaths		–		5	–	3	–	0
Iowa State Normal		–		4	–	3	–	1
Ohio Medical		–		5	–	4	–	0
Lincoln (MO)		–		1	–	1	–	0
Michigan State Normal		–		4	–	4	–	0
Washington University		–		4	–	4	–	2
Heidelberg		–		3	–	4	–	2
Kansas State		–		3	–	4	–	1
Detroit College		–		3	–	4	–	0
Shurtleff		–		2	–	4	–	1
Ohio		–		2	–	4	–	0
South Dakota Agricultural		–		1	–	2	–	0
Mount Union		–		2	–	5	–	1
DePauw		–		2	–	6	–	1
Miami (OH)		–		1	–	4	–	0
Missouri		–		1	–	7	–	1
Western Illinois		–		0	–	3	–	1
Cincinnati		–		1	–	8	–	0
Baldwin–Wallace		–		0	–	1	–	0
Buchtel		–		0	–	2	–	0
Butler		–		0	–	3	–	0
Chicago P&S		–		0	–	4	–	0

The 1903 Western Illinois Purple and Gold football team represented the Western Illinois State Normal School as an independent during the 1903 college football season. The school's athletic association was formed in the fall of 1903. The team played four games, compiled a 0–3–1 record, and was outscored by a total of 75 to 6. It is not known if the team had a coach.

Date	Opponent	Site	Result	Source
October 10	at Monmouth	Monmouth, IL	T 6–6	
October 17	Quincy High School	Macomb, IL	L 0–18	
October 24	Lewiston HS		L 0–28	
November 7	at Northern Illinois State	Glidden Field; DeKalb, IL	L 0–23	

== 1904 ==
1904 Western Illinois Purple and Gold football
- Conference: Independent
- Record: 6–4
- Head coach: L. H. Laughlin (1st season)

1904 Midwestern college football independents records
	Conf.			Overall
Team	W	L	T	W		L		T
Saint Louis		–		10	–	0	–	0
Bethany (KS)		–		7	–	0	–	0
Northern Illinois State		–		5	–	0	–	0
Cape Girardeau Normal		–		2	–	0	–	0
Haskell		–		8	–	1	–	0
Cincinnati		–		7	–	1	–	0
Butler		–		6	–	1	–	0
Doane		–		5	–	1	–	0
Kansas		–		8	–	1	–	1
DePauw		–		8	–	2	–	0
Iowa State		–		7	–	2	–	0
Ohio Northern		–		7	–	2	–	1
Michigan State Normal		–		6	–	2	–	0
Wittenberg		–		6	–	2	–	0
Marquette		–		5	–	2	–	0
Nebraska		–		7	–	3	–	0
Detroit College		–		4	–	2	–	0
South Dakota State		–		4	–	2	–	1
Notre Dame		–		5	–	3	–	0
Iowa State Normal		–		5	–	3	–	1
Western Illinois		–		6	–	4	–	0
Heidelberg		–		6	–	4	–	1
Drake		–		5	–	4	–	0
Carthage		–		0	–	0	–	2
North Dakota Agricultural		–		3	–	3	–	0
Wabash		–		4	–	4	–	0
Fairmount		–		4	–	5	–	0
Lake Forest		–		3	–	5	–	1
Ohio Medical		–		2	–	4	–	2
Washington University		–		4	–	7	–	0
Ohio		–		2	–	4	–	1
Missouri		–		3	–	6	–	0
Mount Union		–		2	–	6	–	0
Miami (OH)		–		1	–	5	–	0
Kansas State		–		1	–	6	–	0
American Medical		–		0	–	3	–	0

The 1904 Western Illinois Purple and Gold football team represented the Western Illinois State Normal School as an independent during the 1904 college football season. In their first and only season under coach L. H. Laughlin, the Purple and Gold compiled a 5–2 record.

At the start of the season, The Macomb Journal opined that the team was "much stronger than last year" with a heavier line and an average weight of 150 pounds. The players included: Rexroat, center; White and L. Rexroad, guards; Sutton and Morrow, tackles; Simeral and Cordell, ends Legere and Switzer, halfbacks; Pierce, fullback; and Wilson, quarterback.

Date	Opponent	Site	Result	Attendance	Source
September 30	Lewiston HS	Macomb, IL	W 27–0		
October 8	Monmouth HS	Macomb, IL	W 6–0		
October 15	at Quincy HS	Quincy, IL	L 0–22		
October 22	at Abingdon HS	Abingdon, IL	W 6–0		
November 4	Saint Alban's Military Academy	Macomb, IL	W 17–4	300	
November 12	Northern Illinois State	Macomb, IL	L 0–15		
November 24	Illinois State	Fair grounds; Macomb, IL	W 10–0	960	

== 1905 ==
1905 Western Illinois Purple and Gold football
- Conference: Independent
- Record: 4–2
- Head coach: A. Laughlin (1st season)

1905 Midwestern college football independents records
	Conf.			Overall
Team	W	L	T	W		L		T
Lincoln (MO)		–		3	–	0	–	0
Detroit College		–		1	–	0	–	0
Kansas		–		10	–	1	–	0
Central Michigan		–		7	–	1	–	0
Doane		–		5	–	1	–	0
Nebraska		–		9	–	2	–	0
Saint Louis		–		7	–	2	–	0
Butler		–		7	–	2	–	1
Kansas State		–		6	–	2	–	0
Northern Illinois State		–		3	–	1	–	1
Carthage		–		4	–	2	–	0
Western Illinois		–		4	–	2	–	0
Iowa State		–		6	–	3	–	0
Washington University		–		7	–	3	–	2
Wittenberg		–		7	–	4	–	0
Heidelberg		–		6	–	4	–	0
Iowa State Normal		–		5	–	3	–	2
Cincinnati		–		5	–	3	–	0
Miami (OH)		–		4	–	3	–	0
Missouri		–		5	–	4	–	0
Notre Dame		–		5	–	4	–	0
Fairmount		–		5	–	4	–	1
Haskell		–		5	–	4	–	1
Lake Forest		–		6	–	5	–	0
Wabash		–		6	–	5	–	0
Drake		–		4	–	4	–	0
Michigan State Normal		–		4	–	4	–	0
Marquette		–		3	–	4	–	0
South Dakota State		–		2	–	3	–	0
Ohio		–		2	–	5	–	2
DePauw		–		3	–	6	–	0
Mount Union		–		2	–	6	–	0
North Dakota Agricultural		–		1	–	4	–	1
Baldwin–Wallace		–		0	–	1	–	0
Chicago P&S		–		0	–	1	–	0
St. Mary's (OH)		–		0	–	3	–	0

The 1905 Western Illinois Purple and Gold football team represented the Western Illinois State Normal School as an independent during the 1905 college football season. In their first and only season under coach A. Laughlin, the Purple and Gold compiled a 4–2 record and outscored opponents by a total of 62 to 49.

Date	Opponent	Site	Result	Source
October 14	Monmouth HS	Macomb, IL	W 18–0	
October 28	Quincy HS	Macomb, IL	W 21–0	
November 3	Lombard	Macomb, IL	W 6–5	
November 11	Carthage	Macomb, IL	W 11–0	
November 18	at Illinois State	Bloomington, IL	L 6–24	
November 30	at Carthage	Carthage, IL	L 0–20	

== 1906 ==
1906 Western Illinois Purple and Gold football
- Conference: Independent
- Record: 1–4
- Head coach: Oliver Morton Dickerson (1st season)

1906 Midwestern college football independents records
	Conf.			Overall
Team	W	L	T	W		L		T
Saint Louis		–		11	–	0	–	0
North Dakota Agricultural		–		5	–	0	–	0
Butler		–		1	–	0	–	0
Michigan State Normal		–		5	–	0	–	1
Iowa State		–		9	–	1	–	0
Ohio		–		7	–	1	–	0
Notre Dame		–		6	–	1	–	0
St. Mary's (OH)		–		5	–	1	–	0
Fairmount		–		7	–	1	–	2
Wabash		–		5	–	1	–	1
South Dakota State		–		3	–	1	–	0
Kansas		–		7	–	2	–	2
Kansas State		–		5	–	2	–	0
Missouri		–		5	–	2	–	1
Detroit College		–		4	–	2	–	1
Northern Illinois State		–		4	–	2	–	1
Carthage		–		3	–	2	–	0
Lake Forest		–		3	–	2	–	0
Nebraska		–		6	–	4	–	0
Wittenberg		–		5	–	4	–	1
Heidelberg		–		3	–	3	–	1
Washington University		–		2	–	2	–	2
Beloit		–		3	–	4	–	1
Franklin		–		3	–	4	–	0
Doane		–		2	–	3	–	0
Shurtleff		–		2	–	4	–	2
Western State Normal		–		1	–	2	–	0
Mount Union		–		2	–	5	–	1
Drake		–		2	–	5	–	0
Haskell		–		2	–	5	–	0
Marquette		–		1	–	4	–	2
Chicago P&S		–		0	–	1	–	1
Cincinnati		–		0	–	7	–	2
Western Illinois		–		0	–	3	–	0

The 1906 Western Illinois Purple and Gold football team represented the Western Illinois State Normal School as an independent during the 1906 college football season. In their first season under coach and historian Oliver Morton Dickerson, the Purple and Gold compiled a 1–4 record.

Date	Opponent	Site	Result	Source
October 25	Blandinsville	Macomb, IL	L 0–5	
November 1	Macomb HS	Macomb, IL	W 28–5	
November 9	Illinois State	Macomb, IL	L 0–18	
November 17	at Carthage	Carthage, WI	L 0–6	
November 23	Kirksville State Normal	Macomb, IL	L 0–8	

== 1907 ==
1907 Western Illinois Purple and Gold football
- Conference: Independent
- Record: 2–3
- Head coach: Charles A. Barnett (1st season)

1907 Midwestern college football independents records
	Conf.			Overall
Team	W	L	T	W		L		T
Marquette		–		6	–	0	–	0
North Dakota Agricultural		–		3	–	0	–	0
Lincoln (MO)		–		1	–	0	–	0
Notre Dame		–		6	–	0	–	1
Miami (OH)		–		6	–	1	–	0
Michigan		–		5	–	1	–	0
Mount Union		–		9	–	2	–	0
Fairmount		–		8	–	2	–	0
Iowa State		–		6	–	2	–	0
Lake Forest		–		4	–	1	–	1
South Dakota State		–		5	–	2	–	0
St. Vincent's (IL)		–		5	–	2	–	0
Wabash		–		5	–	2	–	0
Saint Louis		–		7	–	3	–	0
Western State Normal		–		4	–	2	–	1
Kansas State		–		5	–	3	–	0
Michigan State Normal		–		3	–	2	–	0
Wittenberg		–		5	–	4	–	0
Central Michigan		–		3	–	3	–	0
Drake		–		3	–	4	–	1
Ohio		–		3	–	4	–	1
Western Illinois		–		2	–	3	–	0
Franklin		–		3	–	5	–	1
Heidelberg		–		2	–	4	–	1
Butler		–		1	–	3	–	2
Carthage		–		2	–	5	–	0
Haskell		–		2	–	6	–	1
Chicago P&S		–		1	–	3	–	0
Detroit College		–		1	–	3	–	0
Northern Illinois State		–		1	–	4	–	1
Doane		–		1	–	5	–	0
St. Mary's (OH)		–		0	–	4	–	0
Baldwin–Wallace		–		0	–	6	–	0

The 1907 Western Illinois Purple and Gold football team represented the Western Illinois State Normal School as an independent during the 1907 college football season. In their first season under coach Charles A. Barnett, the Purple and Gold compiled a 2–3 record, scored 54 points, and allowed 54 points to opponents.

The football team was disbanded in late November due to its poor performance. One official at the school stated that "the reason the team had been a failure was because of the use of liquor among the men when they went to play teams in neighboring towns."

Date	Opponent	Site	Result	Source
October 19	Kewanee HS	Macomb, IL	W 4–0	
October 26	Blandinsville HS	Macomb, IL	L 0–6	
November 9	at Illinois State	Normal, IL	L 4–38	
November 15	at Kirksville State Normal	Normal Athletic Field; Kirksville, MO	L 6–11	
November 22	Carthage	Macomb, IL	W 41–0	

== 1908 ==
1908 Western Illinois Purple and Gold football
- Conference: Independent
- Record: 2–3–1
- Head coach: Charles A. Barnett (2nd season)

1908 Midwestern college football independents records
	Conf.			Overall
Team	W	L	T	W		L		T
Kirksville Normal		–		8	–	0	–	0
Miami (OH)		–		7	–	0	–	0
Iowa State Normal		–		5	–	0	–	0
Lincoln (MO)		–		2	–	0	–	0
DePaul		–		7	–	0	–	1
St. Mary's (OH)		–		7	–	0	–	1
Butler		–		5	–	0	–	1
Ohio Northern		–		9	–	1	–	0
Fairmount		–		8	–	1	–	0
Notre Dame		–		8	–	1	–	0
Michigan Agricultural		–		6	–	0	–	2
Lake Forest		–		4	–	1	–	1
Saint Louis		–		6	–	2	–	2
Kansas State		–		6	–	2	–	0
Michigan		–		5	–	2	–	1
Marquette		–		4	–	2	–	1
St. Viator		–		5	–	3	–	0
Central Michigan		–		4	–	3	–	0
Mount Union		–		5	–	4	–	1
Doane		–		4	–	4	–	0
South Dakota State		–		3	–	3	–	1
Buchtel		–		3	–	4	–	0
Western State Normal		–		3	–	4	–	0
Western Illinois		–		2	–	3	–	1
Carthage		–		2	–	3	–	0
Haskell		–		3	–	5	–	1
Wittenberg		–		3	–	5	–	1
Ohio		–		3	–	5	–	0
North Dakota Agricultural		–		2	–	3	–	0
Cincinnati		–		1	–	4	–	1
Wabash		–		2	–	6	–	0
Northern Illinois State		–		1	–	5	–	1
Michigan State Normal		–		1	–	4	–	0
Heidelberg		–		1	–	6	–	0
Franklin		–		0	–	9	–	1
Baldwin–Wallace		–		0	–	2	–	0
Chicago P&S		–		0	–	4	–	0

The 1908 Western Illinois Purple and Gold football team represented the Western Illinois State Normal School as an independent during the 1908 college football season. In their second season under coach Charles A. Barnett, the Purple and Gold compiled a 2–3–1 record and outscored opponents by a total of 107 to 61.

Date	Opponent	Site	Result	Source
October 17	at Moline HS	Moline, IL	L 0–5	
October 24	at Gem City Business College	Quincy, IL	L 0–25	
October 30	Knox	Macomb, IL	T 5–5	
November 7	at Carthage	Carthage, IL	L 11–21	
November 14	Hedding	Macomb, IL	W 43–0	
November 26	Macomb HS	Macomb, IL	W 48–0	

== 1909 ==
1909 Western Illinois Purple and Gold football
- Conference: Independent
- Record: 2–3
- Head coach: Francis Taft (1st season)

1909 Midwestern college football independents records
	Conf.			Overall
Team	W	L	T	W		L		T
Iowa State Normal		–		6	–	0	–	0
Notre Dame		–		7	–	0	–	1
Michigan Agricultural		–		8	–	1	–	0
Carthage		–		6	–	1	–	0
Michigan		–		6	–	1	–	0
Western State Normal		–		6	–	1	–	0
Mount Union		–		8	–	2	–	0
Lake Forest		–		5	–	1	–	1
Haskell		–		7	–	2	–	0
Detroit College		–		3	–	1	–	2
Butler		–		5	–	3	–	0
Central Michigan		–		4	–	3	–	0
St. Mary's (OH)		–		4	–	3	–	0
Cincinnati		–		4	–	3	–	1
Doane		–		3	–	2	–	3
Buchtel		–		4	–	4	–	0
Rose Poly		–		4	–	4	–	0
Marquette		–		2	–	2	–	1
North Dakota Agricultural		–		2	–	2	–	1
Wabash		–		3	–	4	–	1
Miami (OH)		–		3	–	4	–	0
Ohio		–		2	–	4	–	2
Saint Louis		–		3	–	5	–	0
Michigan State Normal		–		2	–	4	–	0
Western Illinois		–		1	–	2	–	0
Fairmount		–		2	–	5	–	1
Northern Illinois State		–		2	–	6	–	0
South Dakota State		–		1	–	3	–	0
Heidelberg		–		0	–	7	–	2

The 1909 Western Illinois Purple and Gold football team represented the Western Illinois State Normal School as an independent during the 1909 college football season. In their first season under coach Francis Taft, the Purple and Gold compiled a 2–3 record.

Taft drilled the team in difficult forms of the forward pass and on-side kick, plays which had only been used in "their simplest forms" prior to the 1909 season.

Date	Opponent	Site	Result	Source
October 30	Saint Alban's Military Academy	Macomb, IL	W 15–12	
November 5	Carthage	Macomb, IL	L 0–53	
November 13	at Lombard	Galesburg, IL	L 6–33	
	Kewanee HS		L 0–13	
November 25	Roseville HS		W 31–0	
