= 1903 DePauw football team =

American college football season

1903 DePauw football
- Conference: Independent
- Record: 2–6–1
- Head coach: Chauncey L. Berrien (1st season)

1903 Midwestern college football independents records
	Conf.			Overall
Team	W	L	T	W		L		T
Nebraska		–		11	–	0	–	0
North Dakota		–		7	–	0	–	0
Central Michigan		–		6	–	0	–	0
Notre Dame		–		8	–	0	–	1
Iowa State		–		8	–	1	–	0
Marquette		–		7	–	1	–	0
Lake Forest		–		6	–	1	–	0
North Dakota Agricultural		–		5	–	1	–	0
Haskell		–		7	–	2	–	0
St. Xavier		–		7	–	2	–	0
Fairmount		–		6	–	2	–	0
Wabash		–		9	–	3	–	0
Wittenberg		–		5	–	2	–	1
Doane		–		2	–	1	–	0
Northern Illinois State		–		4	–	2	–	0
American Medical		–		6	–	3	–	0
Kansas		–		6	–	3	–	0
Drake		–		5	–	3	–	0
Kirksville Osteopaths		–		5	–	3	–	0
Iowa State Normal		–		4	–	3	–	1
Ohio Medical		–		5	–	4	–	0
Lincoln (MO)		–		1	–	1	–	0
Michigan State Normal		–		4	–	4	–	0
Washington University		–		4	–	4	–	2
Heidelberg		–		3	–	4	–	2
Kansas State		–		3	–	4	–	1
Detroit College		–		3	–	4	–	0
Shurtleff		–		2	–	4	–	1
Ohio		–		2	–	4	–	0
South Dakota Agricultural		–		1	–	2	–	0
Mount Union		–		2	–	5	–	1
DePauw		–		2	–	6	–	1
Miami (OH)		–		1	–	4	–	0
Missouri		–		1	–	7	–	1
Western Illinois		–		0	–	3	–	1
Cincinnati		–		1	–	8	–	0
Baldwin–Wallace		–		0	–	1	–	0
Buchtel		–		0	–	2	–	0
Butler		–		0	–	3	–	0
Chicago P&S		–		0	–	4	–	0

The 1903 DePauw Football Team was an American football team that represented DePauw University as an independent during the 1903 college football season. Led by Chauncey L. Berrien in his first and only season as head coach, DePauw compiled a record of 2–6–1.

== Schedule ==
Date	Opponent	Site	Result	Source
September 26	DePauw alumni	greencastle, IN	L 0–5	
October 3	at Earlham	Richmond, IN	T 0–0	
October 10	Miami (OH)	Greencastle, IN	W 11–6	
October 17	Notre Dame	Greencastle, IN	L 0–56	
October 24	Butler	Greencastle, IN	W 18–0	
October 31	at Knox	Galesburg, IL	L 0–10	
November 7	Lake Forest	Greencastle, IN	L 0–5	
November 14	at Indiana	Jordan Field; Bloomington, IN	L 0–70	
November 21	Wabash	Greencastle, IN	L 0–10	
