= 1903 Chilocco Indians football team =

College football season

1903 Chilocco Indians football
- Conference: Independent

The 1903 Chilocco Indian School football team was an American football team that represented the Chilocco Indian School in the north-central Oklahoma Territory during the 1903 college football season. Records have been found of nine games played by Chilocco in the fall of 1903.

Chilocco was one of three Indian schools in the early 1900s to field football teams that competed in college football. The other two were Carlisle in Pennsylvania and Haskell in Kansas.

William Henry Dietz played football for Chilocco in the early 1900s before transferring to Friends University in the fall of 1904. Dietz was inducted into the College Football Hall of Fame.

By October 1903, enrollment at the school was 770.

In December 1903, the Arkansas City Daily Traveler published the Chilocco football yell as follows:

Chiloc Chiloc!
Hicoty-hoc
Hunkety-chok
Small pox, chicken pox
Chiloc, Chiloc!
Add on an Indian warwhoop and you have the Chilocoo football yell."

== Schedule ==
Date	Opponent	Site	Result	Source
October 3	at Oklahoma	Norman, Oklahoma Territory	L 5–38	
October 9	Fairmount	Fairmount grounds; Wichita, KS	L 6–50	
October 12	Southwestern (KS)	Arkansas City, KS	Postponed	
October 17	at Sumner County High School	Wellington, KS	L 5–16	
October 19	vs. Southwestern (KS)	Athletic park; Arkansas City, KS	W 21–0	
November 7	Mayfield			
November 14	at Southwestern (KS)	Winfield, KS		
November 21	Arkansas City		W 12–0	
November 26	Logan County High School	Guthrie, Oklahoma Territory		
