= 1903 Drake Bulldogs football team =

American college football season

1903 Drake Bulldogs football
- Conference: Independent
- Record: 5–3
- Head coach: W. J. Monilaw (1st season)

1903 Midwestern college football independents records
| | Conf. | | | Overall |
| Team | W | L | T | W | | L | | T |
|---|---|---|---|---|---|---|---|---|
| Nebraska | | – | | 11 | – | 0 | – | 0 |
| North Dakota | | – | | 7 | – | 0 | – | 0 |
| Central Michigan | | – | | 6 | – | 0 | – | 0 |
| Notre Dame | | – | | 8 | – | 0 | – | 1 |
| Iowa State | | – | | 8 | – | 1 | – | 0 |
| Marquette | | – | | 7 | – | 1 | – | 0 |
| Lake Forest | | – | | 6 | – | 1 | – | 0 |
| North Dakota Agricultural | | – | | 5 | – | 1 | – | 0 |
| Haskell | | – | | 7 | – | 2 | – | 0 |
| St. Xavier | | – | | 7 | – | 2 | – | 0 |
| Fairmount | | – | | 6 | – | 2 | – | 0 |
| Wabash | | – | | 9 | – | 3 | – | 0 |
| Wittenberg | | – | | 5 | – | 2 | – | 1 |
| Doane | | – | | 2 | – | 1 | – | 0 |
| Northern Illinois State | | – | | 4 | – | 2 | – | 0 |
| American Medical | | – | | 6 | – | 3 | – | 0 |
| Kansas | | – | | 6 | – | 3 | – | 0 |
| Drake | | – | | 5 | – | 3 | – | 0 |
| Kirksville Osteopaths | | – | | 5 | – | 3 | – | 0 |
| Iowa State Normal | | – | | 4 | – | 3 | – | 1 |
| Ohio Medical | | – | | 5 | – | 4 | – | 0 |
| Lincoln (MO) | | – | | 1 | – | 1 | – | 0 |
| Michigan State Normal | | – | | 4 | – | 4 | – | 0 |
| Washington University | | – | | 4 | – | 4 | – | 2 |
| Heidelberg | | – | | 3 | – | 4 | – | 2 |
| Kansas State | | – | | 3 | – | 4 | – | 1 |
| Detroit College | | – | | 3 | – | 4 | – | 0 |
| Shurtleff | | – | | 2 | – | 4 | – | 1 |
| Ohio | | – | | 2 | – | 4 | – | 0 |
| South Dakota Agricultural | | – | | 1 | – | 2 | – | 0 |
| Mount Union | | – | | 2 | – | 5 | – | 1 |
| DePauw | | – | | 2 | – | 6 | – | 1 |
| Miami (OH) | | – | | 1 | – | 4 | – | 0 |
| Missouri | | – | | 1 | – | 7 | – | 1 |
| Western Illinois | | – | | 0 | – | 3 | – | 1 |
| Cincinnati | | – | | 1 | – | 8 | – | 0 |
| Baldwin–Wallace | | – | | 0 | – | 1 | – | 0 |
| Buchtel | | – | | 0 | – | 2 | – | 0 |
| Butler | | – | | 0 | – | 3 | – | 0 |
| Chicago P&S | | – | | 0 | – | 4 | – | 0 |

The 1903 Drake Bulldogs football team was an American football team that represented Drake University as an independent during the 1903 college football season. In its first season under head coach W. J. Monilaw, the team compiled a 5–3 record and outscored opponents by a total of 170 to 93.

== Schedule ==
| Date | Opponent | Site | Result | Attendance | Source |
|---|---|---|---|---|---|
| October 3 | Penn (IA) | Des Moines, IA | W 45–0 | | |
| October 10 | at Iowa | Iowa Field; Iowa City, IA | L 6–22 | | |
| October 17 | Missouri | Des Moines, IA | W 17–0 | | |
| October 24 | at Michigan | Regents Field; Ann Arbor, MI | L 0–47 | | |
| October 31 | Simpson | Des Moines, IA | W 45–2 | > 2,000 | |
| November 6 | Cornell (IA) | Des Moines, IA | W 25–6 | | |
| November 14 | at Grinnell | Grinnell, IA | W 32–0 | | |
| November 26 | Iowa State | Des Moines, IA | L 0–16 | | |
