= 1903 Haskell Indians football team =

American college football season

1903 Haskell Indians football
- Conference: Independent
- Record: 7–2
- Head coach: Albert E. Herrnstein (1st season)

1903 Midwestern college football independents records
	Conf.			Overall
Team	W	L	T	W		L		T
Nebraska		–		11	–	0	–	0
North Dakota		–		7	–	0	–	0
Central Michigan		–		6	–	0	–	0
Notre Dame		–		8	–	0	–	1
Iowa State		–		8	–	1	–	0
Marquette		–		7	–	1	–	0
Lake Forest		–		6	–	1	–	0
North Dakota Agricultural		–		5	–	1	–	0
Haskell		–		7	–	2	–	0
St. Xavier		–		7	–	2	–	0
Fairmount		–		6	–	2	–	0
Wabash		–		9	–	3	–	0
Wittenberg		–		5	–	2	–	1
Doane		–		2	–	1	–	0
Northern Illinois State		–		4	–	2	–	0
American Medical		–		6	–	3	–	0
Kansas		–		6	–	3	–	0
Drake		–		5	–	3	–	0
Kirksville Osteopaths		–		5	–	3	–	0
Iowa State Normal		–		4	–	3	–	1
Ohio Medical		–		5	–	4	–	0
Lincoln (MO)		–		1	–	1	–	0
Michigan State Normal		–		4	–	4	–	0
Washington University		–		4	–	4	–	2
Heidelberg		–		3	–	4	–	2
Kansas State		–		3	–	4	–	1
Detroit College		–		3	–	4	–	0
Shurtleff		–		2	–	4	–	1
Ohio		–		2	–	4	–	0
South Dakota Agricultural		–		1	–	2	–	0
Mount Union		–		2	–	5	–	1
DePauw		–		2	–	6	–	1
Miami (OH)		–		1	–	4	–	0
Missouri		–		1	–	7	–	1
Western Illinois		–		0	–	3	–	1
Cincinnati		–		1	–	8	–	0
Baldwin–Wallace		–		0	–	1	–	0
Buchtel		–		0	–	2	–	0
Butler		–		0	–	3	–	0
Chicago P&S		–		0	–	4	–	0

The 1903 Haskell Indians football team was an American football team that represented the Haskell Indian Institute (now known as Haskell Indian Nations University) as an independent during the 1902 college football season. In its first season under head coach Albert E. Herrnstein, Haskell compiled a 7–2 record and outscored opponents by a total of 131 to 50. Its victories included shutouts against Texas (6–0), Missouri (12–0), and Creighton (22–0); its losses were to Nebraska (16–0) and Chicago (17–11).

== Schedule ==
Date	Time	Opponent	Site	Result	Attendance	Source
September 26		at Colorado College	Colorado Springs, CO	W 45–0		
October 3		at Kansas City Medics	Association Park; Kansas City, MO	W 11–6		
October 9	3:00 p.m.	vs. Texas	State fair grounds; Dallas, TX	W 6–0	3,000	
October 17		at Nebraska	Antelope Field; Lincoln, NE	L 0–16	3,000	
October 24		at Kansas	McCook Field; Lawrence, KS	W 12–6		
October 31	3:00 p.m.	vs. Missouri	Association Park; Kansas City, MO	W 12–0		
November 7	2:44 p.m.	at Chicago	Marshall Field; Chicago, IL	L 11–17		
November 14	3:30 p.m.	at Creighton	Vinton Street Park; Omaha, NE	W 22–0	2,000	
November 26		at Denver	Denver, CO	W 12–5		

== Second team schedule ==
Date	Time	Opponent	Site	Result	Source
October 10		at Ottawa High School	Ottawa, KS	W 15–0	
October 17	3:00 p.m.	Manual Training High School	Haskell Field; Lawrence, KS	W 31–0	
November 9	2:30 p.m.	College of Emporia	Haskell Field; Lawrence, KS	W 6–0	
November 14	2:00 p.m.	at Fort Leavenworth	League park; Leavenworth, KS	L 6–34	
November 21		Leavenworth High School	Haskell Field; Lawrence, KS	W 45–0 or 50–0	
November 26		at Kansas State	Manhattan, KS	L 6–34	
