= 1903 Washington University football team =

American college football season

1903 Washington University football
- Conference: Independent
- Record: 4–4–2
- Head coach: L. W. Boynton (1st season)
- Captain: Smith
- Home stadium: League Park

1903 Midwestern college football independents records
	Conf.			Overall
Team	W	L	T	W		L		T
Nebraska		–		11	–	0	–	0
North Dakota		–		7	–	0	–	0
Central Michigan		–		6	–	0	–	0
Notre Dame		–		8	–	0	–	1
Iowa State		–		8	–	1	–	0
Marquette		–		7	–	1	–	0
Lake Forest		–		6	–	1	–	0
North Dakota Agricultural		–		5	–	1	–	0
Haskell		–		7	–	2	–	0
St. Xavier		–		7	–	2	–	0
Fairmount		–		6	–	2	–	0
Wabash		–		9	–	3	–	0
Wittenberg		–		5	–	2	–	1
Doane		–		2	–	1	–	0
Northern Illinois State		–		4	–	2	–	0
American Medical		–		6	–	3	–	0
Kansas		–		6	–	3	–	0
Drake		–		5	–	3	–	0
Kirksville Osteopaths		–		5	–	3	–	0
Iowa State Normal		–		4	–	3	–	1
Ohio Medical		–		5	–	4	–	0
Lincoln (MO)		–		1	–	1	–	0
Michigan State Normal		–		4	–	4	–	0
Washington University		–		4	–	4	–	2
Heidelberg		–		3	–	4	–	2
Kansas State		–		3	–	4	–	1
Detroit College		–		3	–	4	–	0
Shurtleff		–		2	–	4	–	1
Ohio		–		2	–	4	–	0
South Dakota Agricultural		–		1	–	2	–	0
Mount Union		–		2	–	5	–	1
DePauw		–		2	–	6	–	1
Miami (OH)		–		1	–	4	–	0
Missouri		–		1	–	7	–	1
Western Illinois		–		0	–	3	–	1
Cincinnati		–		1	–	8	–	0
Baldwin–Wallace		–		0	–	1	–	0
Buchtel		–		0	–	2	–	0
Butler		–		0	–	3	–	0
Chicago P&S		–		0	–	4	–	0

The 1903 Washington University football team represented Washington University in St. Louis as an independent during the 1903 college football season. Led by first-year head coach L. W. Boynton, Washington University compiled a 4–4–2 record and outscored their opponents by a total of 109 to 103.

== Schedule ==
Date	Time	Opponent	Site	Result	Attendance	Source
October 3		Rose Polytechnic	League Park; St. Louis, MO	W 21–0		
October 10		Northwestern	League Park; St. Louis, MO	L 0–21		
October 17		at Shurtleff	Sportsman's Park; Alton, IL	W 28–0		
October 24		at Lombard	Galesburg, IL	L 6–11		
October 31		Missouri Mines	League Park; St. Louis, MO	T 0–0		
November 7		Missouri	League Park; St. Louis, MO	T 0–0	8,000	
November 14		at Vanderbilt	Dudley Field; Nashville, TN	L 0–31		
November 21		Cincinnati	League Park; St. Louis, MO	W 23–11	1,000	
November 26	3:30 p.m.	Iowa	League Park; St. Louis, MO	L 2–12		
December 2		Saint Louis	League Park; St. Louis, MO	W 29–5		
