= 1903 Fairmount Wheatshockers football team =

American college football season

1903 Fairmount Wheatshockers football
- Conference: Independent
- Record: 6–2
- Head coach: None

1903 Midwestern college football independents records
	Conf.			Overall
Team	W	L	T	W		L		T
Nebraska		–		11	–	0	–	0
North Dakota		–		7	–	0	–	0
Central Michigan		–		6	–	0	–	0
Notre Dame		–		8	–	0	–	1
Iowa State		–		8	–	1	–	0
Marquette		–		7	–	1	–	0
Lake Forest		–		6	–	1	–	0
North Dakota Agricultural		–		5	–	1	–	0
Haskell		–		7	–	2	–	0
St. Xavier		–		7	–	2	–	0
Fairmount		–		6	–	2	–	0
Wabash		–		9	–	3	–	0
Wittenberg		–		5	–	2	–	1
Doane		–		2	–	1	–	0
Northern Illinois State		–		4	–	2	–	0
American Medical		–		6	–	3	–	0
Kansas		–		6	–	3	–	0
Drake		–		5	–	3	–	0
Kirksville Osteopaths		–		5	–	3	–	0
Iowa State Normal		–		4	–	3	–	1
Ohio Medical		–		5	–	4	–	0
Lincoln (MO)		–		1	–	1	–	0
Michigan State Normal		–		4	–	4	–	0
Washington University		–		4	–	4	–	2
Heidelberg		–		3	–	4	–	2
Kansas State		–		3	–	4	–	1
Detroit College		–		3	–	4	–	0
Shurtleff		–		2	–	4	–	1
Ohio		–		2	–	4	–	0
South Dakota Agricultural		–		1	–	2	–	0
Mount Union		–		2	–	5	–	1
DePauw		–		2	–	6	–	1
Miami (OH)		–		1	–	4	–	0
Missouri		–		1	–	7	–	1
Western Illinois		–		0	–	3	–	1
Cincinnati		–		1	–	8	–	0
Baldwin–Wallace		–		0	–	1	–	0
Buchtel		–		0	–	2	–	0
Butler		–		0	–	3	–	0
Chicago P&S		–		0	–	4	–	0

The 1903 Fairmount Wheatshockers football team was an American football team that represented Fairmount College (now known as Wichita State University) as an independent during the 1903 college football season. The team compiled a 6–2 record, shut out four of eight opponents, and outscored all opponents by a total of 126 to 27. The team had no coach; Walter Stahl was the team manager.

== Schedule ==
Date	Opponent	Site	Result	Attendance	Source
September 26	at Cooper	Sterling, KS	L 0–5		
October 3	Sumner County High School	Fairmount grounds; Wichita, KS	W 10–0		
October 9	Chilocco	Fairmount grounds; Wichita, KS	W 50–6		
October 17	Kansas Wesleyan	Fairmont grounds; Wichita, KS	W 33–0		
October 24	Kingfisher	Kingfisher, Oklahoma Territory	W 11–0		
October 26	at Oklahoma	Oklahoma City, Oklahoma Territory	L 5–11		
November 3	Cooper	Fairmount grounds; Wichita, KS	W 6–0		
November 26	Friends	Fairmount grounds; Wichita, KS	W 11–5	1,800	
