= 1903 Iowa State Cyclones football team =

American college football season

1903 Iowa State Cyclones football
- Conference: Independent
- Record: 8–1
- Head coach: A. W. Ristine (2nd season)
- Captain: Preston Daniels
- Home stadium: State Field

1903 Midwestern college football independents records
	Conf.			Overall
Team	W	L	T	W		L		T
Nebraska		–		11	–	0	–	0
North Dakota		–		7	–	0	–	0
Central Michigan		–		6	–	0	–	0
Notre Dame		–		8	–	0	–	1
Iowa State		–		8	–	1	–	0
Marquette		–		7	–	1	–	0
Lake Forest		–		6	–	1	–	0
North Dakota Agricultural		–		5	–	1	–	0
Haskell		–		7	–	2	–	0
St. Xavier		–		7	–	2	–	0
Fairmount		–		6	–	2	–	0
Wabash		–		9	–	3	–	0
Wittenberg		–		5	–	2	–	1
Doane		–		2	–	1	–	0
Northern Illinois State		–		4	–	2	–	0
American Medical		–		6	–	3	–	0
Kansas		–		6	–	3	–	0
Drake		–		5	–	3	–	0
Kirksville Osteopaths		–		5	–	3	–	0
Iowa State Normal		–		4	–	3	–	1
Ohio Medical		–		5	–	4	–	0
Lincoln (MO)		–		1	–	1	–	0
Michigan State Normal		–		4	–	4	–	0
Washington University		–		4	–	4	–	2
Heidelberg		–		3	–	4	–	2
Kansas State		–		3	–	4	–	1
Detroit College		–		3	–	4	–	0
Shurtleff		–		2	–	4	–	1
Ohio		–		2	–	4	–	0
South Dakota Agricultural		–		1	–	2	–	0
Mount Union		–		2	–	5	–	1
DePauw		–		2	–	6	–	1
Miami (OH)		–		1	–	4	–	0
Missouri		–		1	–	7	–	1
Western Illinois		–		0	–	3	–	1
Cincinnati		–		1	–	8	–	0
Baldwin–Wallace		–		0	–	1	–	0
Buchtel		–		0	–	2	–	0
Butler		–		0	–	3	–	0
Chicago P&S		–		0	–	4	–	0

The 1903 Iowa State Cyclones football team represented Iowa State College of Agricultural and Mechanic Arts (later renamed Iowa State University) as an independent during the 1903 college football season. In their second season under head coach A. W. Ristine, the Cyclones compiled an 8–1 record, shut out five of nine opponents, and outscored all opponents by a combined total of 202 to 59. Preston Daniels was the team captain. The only loss of the year was to eventual national champion Minnesota.

Between 1892 and 1913, the football team played on a field that later became the site of the university's Parks Library. The field was known as State Field; when the new field opened in 1914, it became known as "New State Field". season results table

== Schedule ==
Date	Time	Opponent	Site	Result	Attendance	Source
September 25		Highland Park	State Field; Ames, IA	W 16–0		
October 3	3:00 p.m.	at Omaha Light Guards	Manawa Field; Council Bluffs, IA	W 18–0	1,000	
October 10		at Minnesota	Northrop Field; Minneapolis, MN	L 0–46		
October 17		Coe	State Field; Ames, IA	W 36–5		
October 31		South Dakota	State Field; Ames, IA	W 23–0		
November 7	2:35 p.m.	at Grinnell	Grinnell, IA	W 41–6		
November 14		at Simpson	Indianola, IA	W 11–2		
November 20		at Cornell (IA)	Mount Vernon, IA	W 41–0		
November 26		at Drake	Des Moines, IA	W 16–0		
