= 1903 Northern Illinois State Normal football team =

American college football season

1903 Northern Illinois State Normal football
- Conference: Independent
- Record: 4–2
- Head coach: John A. H. Keith (5th season)
- Captains: Floyd Ritzman; Donald Kays
- Home stadium: Glidden Field

1903 Midwestern college football independents records
	Conf.			Overall
Team	W	L	T	W		L		T
Nebraska		–		11	–	0	–	0
North Dakota		–		7	–	0	–	0
Central Michigan		–		6	–	0	–	0
Notre Dame		–		8	–	0	–	1
Iowa State		–		8	–	1	–	0
Marquette		–		7	–	1	–	0
Lake Forest		–		6	–	1	–	0
North Dakota Agricultural		–		5	–	1	–	0
Haskell		–		7	–	2	–	0
St. Xavier		–		7	–	2	–	0
Fairmount		–		6	–	2	–	0
Wabash		–		9	–	3	–	0
Wittenberg		–		5	–	2	–	1
Doane		–		2	–	1	–	0
Northern Illinois State		–		4	–	2	–	0
American Medical		–		6	–	3	–	0
Kansas		–		6	–	3	–	0
Drake		–		5	–	3	–	0
Kirksville Osteopaths		–		5	–	3	–	0
Iowa State Normal		–		4	–	3	–	1
Ohio Medical		–		5	–	4	–	0
Lincoln (MO)		–		1	–	1	–	0
Michigan State Normal		–		4	–	4	–	0
Washington University		–		4	–	4	–	2
Heidelberg		–		3	–	4	–	2
Kansas State		–		3	–	4	–	1
Detroit College		–		3	–	4	–	0
Shurtleff		–		2	–	4	–	1
Ohio		–		2	–	4	–	0
South Dakota Agricultural		–		1	–	2	–	0
Mount Union		–		2	–	5	–	1
DePauw		–		2	–	6	–	1
Miami (OH)		–		1	–	4	–	0
Missouri		–		1	–	7	–	1
Western Illinois		–		0	–	3	–	1
Cincinnati		–		1	–	8	–	0
Baldwin–Wallace		–		0	–	1	–	0
Buchtel		–		0	–	2	–	0
Butler		–		0	–	3	–	0
Chicago P&S		–		0	–	4	–	0

The 1903 Northern Illinois State Normal football team represented Northern Illinois State Normal College as an independent in the 1903 college football season. They were led by fifth-year head coach John A. H. Keith and played their home games at Glidden Field, located on the east end of campus. The team finished the season with a 4–2 record. Floyd Ritzman and Donald Kays were the team's co-captains.

== Schedule ==
Date	Opponent	Site	Result	Source
October 3	at Belvidere Business College	Belvidere, IL	W 6–0	
October 10	Alumni	Glidden Field; DeKalb, IL	W 6–0	
October 24	at Platteville Normal	Platteville, WI	L 0–12	
November 7	Western Illinois	Glidden Field; DeKalb, IL	W 23–0	
November 14	at Eastern Illinois	Charleston, IL	L 0–29	
November 21	Belvidere/DeKalb team (Note: This game was originally scheduled with Belvidere Business College. The college only sent three players, who formed a team with players from DeKalb.)	Glidden Field; DeKalb, IL	W 15–0	
November 26	DeKalb High School	Glidden Field; DeKalb, IL	Canceled	
