= 1903 Miami Redskins football team =

American college football season

1903 Miami Redskins football
- Conference: Independent
- Record: 1–4
- Head coach: Peter McPherson (2nd season)
- Home stadium: Miami Field

1903 Midwestern college football independents records
	Conf.			Overall
Team	W	L	T	W		L		T
Nebraska		–		11	–	0	–	0
North Dakota		–		7	–	0	–	0
Central Michigan		–		6	–	0	–	0
Notre Dame		–		8	–	0	–	1
Iowa State		–		8	–	1	–	0
Marquette		–		7	–	1	–	0
Lake Forest		–		6	–	1	–	0
North Dakota Agricultural		–		5	–	1	–	0
Haskell		–		7	–	2	–	0
St. Xavier		–		7	–	2	–	0
Fairmount		–		6	–	2	–	0
Wabash		–		9	–	3	–	0
Wittenberg		–		5	–	2	–	1
Doane		–		2	–	1	–	0
Northern Illinois State		–		4	–	2	–	0
American Medical		–		6	–	3	–	0
Kansas		–		6	–	3	–	0
Drake		–		5	–	3	–	0
Kirksville Osteopaths		–		5	–	3	–	0
Iowa State Normal		–		4	–	3	–	1
Ohio Medical		–		5	–	4	–	0
Lincoln (MO)		–		1	–	1	–	0
Michigan State Normal		–		4	–	4	–	0
Washington University		–		4	–	4	–	2
Heidelberg		–		3	–	4	–	2
Kansas State		–		3	–	4	–	1
Detroit College		–		3	–	4	–	0
Shurtleff		–		2	–	4	–	1
Ohio		–		2	–	4	–	0
South Dakota Agricultural		–		1	–	2	–	0
Mount Union		–		2	–	5	–	1
DePauw		–		2	–	6	–	1
Miami (OH)		–		1	–	4	–	0
Missouri		–		1	–	7	–	1
Western Illinois		–		0	–	3	–	1
Cincinnati		–		1	–	8	–	0
Baldwin–Wallace		–		0	–	1	–	0
Buchtel		–		0	–	2	–	0
Butler		–		0	–	3	–	0
Chicago P&S		–		0	–	4	–	0

The 1903 Miami Redskins football team was an American football team that represented Miami University during the 1903 college football season. Under head coach Peter McPherson, Miami compiled a 1–4 record.

== Schedule ==
Date	Time	Opponent	Site	Result	Source
October 3		at Ohio Wesleyan	Delaware, OH	L 6–19	
October 10		at DePauw	Greencastle, IN	L 6–11	
October 17	2:30 p.m.	at Cincinnati	Burnet Woods; Cincinnati, OH (Victory Bell)	W 15–0	
October 24		at Kentucky State College	Lexington, KY	L 0–47	
October 31		at St. Xavier	Gym Grounds; Cincinnati, OH	L 0–33	
