= Carl Pray =

American football coach

Biographical details
- Born: March 30, 1870; Dimondale, Michigan, U.S.
- Died: August 10, 1949 (aged 79); Ypsilanti, Michigan, U.S.

Coaching career (HC unless noted)

Football
- 1897–1899: Central Michigan

Baseball
- 1899–1900: Central Michigan

Head coaching record
- Overall: 6–5 (football); 3–4 (baseball)

Carl Esek Pray (March 30, 1870 – August 10, 1949) was the head coach of the Central Michigan college football program from 1897 to 1899. A graduate of Olivet College, he was a history instructor at the Milwaukee Normal School after leaving Central Michigan. He was also a professor of history at Michigan State Normal College for 23 years, from 1913 to 1936.

== Head coaching record ==
=== Football ===
Year	Team	Overall	Conference	Standing	Bowl/playoffs
Central Michigan Normalites (Independent) (1897–1899)
1897	Central Michigan	2–1			
1898	Central Michigan	1–2			
1899	Central Michigan	3–2			
Central Michigan:		6–5			
Total:		6–5			
