= Central Michigan Normalites football, 1896–1909 =

American college football seasons

The Central Michigan Normalites football team (now known as the Central Michigan Chippewas) represented Central Michigan Normal School (now known as Central Michigan University) of Mount Pleasant, Michigan, in American football, beginning in 1896. Highlights of the school's early years of intercollegiate football include the following:

- On October 31, 1896, the team played its first game, losing to Alma High School by a 14–5 score.
- On November 21, 1896, the team won its first game, a 14–4 victory over Bay City High School.
- In 1902, the team compiled a perfect 4–0 record and shut out all four opponents by a combined total of 82 to 0.
- In 1903, the team compiled its second consecutive perfect record of 6–0.
- The team compiled a 17-game winning streak that began with a victory over Cadillac High School in 1899 and continued until November 4, 1905, when it lost to Alma College.
- On November 1, 1902, the team played its first game in the Central Michigan–Eastern Michigan football rivalry. Central won the first game by a 13–0 score.
- On October 19, 1907, the team played its first game in the Central Michigan–Western Michigan football rivalry. Central lost the game by a 29–0 score.

== 1896 ==
1896 Central Michigan Normalites football
- Conference: Independent
- Record: 3–1
- Head coach: Pete McCormick (1st season)

1896 Midwestern college football independents records
	Conf.			Overall
Team	W	L	T	W		L		T
Carthage		–		4	–	0	–	0
St. Ignatius College Chicago		–		1	–	0	–	0
Washburn		–		6	–	1	–	1
Iowa Agricultural		–		8	–	2	–	0
Central Michigan		–		3	–	1	–	0
Miami (OH)		–		3	–	1	–	0
Ohio Wesleyan		–		6	–	2	–	0
Detroit College		–		5	–	2	–	0
North Dakota Agricultural		–		3	–	1	–	1
Heidelberg		–		2	–	1	–	0
Ohio		–		4	–	2	–	1
Indiana		–		5	–	3	–	0
Beloit		–		2	–	1	–	3
Butler		–		4	–	3	–	0
Iowa State Normal		–		4	–	3	–	0
Notre Dame		–		4	–	3	–	0
Cincinnati		–		4	–	3	–	1
Wittenberg		–		5	–	4	–	0
Baldwin–Wallace		–		2	–	2	–	0
College of Emporia		–		2	–	3	–	0
Ohio State		–		5	–	5	–	1
Lake Forest		–		3	–	4	–	1
Mount Union		–		3	–	4	–	1
Wabash		–		3	–	4	–	0
Drake		–		2	–	3	–	0
Chicago P&S		–		2	–	4	–	2
Hillsdale		–		2	–	4	–	0
Kansas State		–		0	–	1	–	1
Indiana State Normal		–		0	–	1	–	0
Buchtel		–		0	–	1	–	0
Washington University		–		0	–	2	–	0
Doane		–		0	–	5	–	0
Haskell		–		0	–	5	–	0

The 1896 Central Michigan Normalites football team represented Central Michigan Normal School, later renamed Central Michigan University, as an independent during the 1896 college football season. Central Michigan was founded in 1892 and fielded its first varsity football team in 1896. Under head coach Pete McCormick, the first Central Michigan football team compiled a 3–1 record and outscored their four opponents by a combined total of 62 to 22. All four games were played against high school teams. On October 31, 1896, the Central Michigan football team lost to Alma High School, 14–5, in a game played in Mount Pleasant. On November 21, 1896, Central Michigan defeated Bay City High School by a 14–4 score at Mt. Pleasant.

=== Schedule ===
Date	Opponent	Site	Result
October 31	Alma High School	Mount Pleasant, MI	L 5–14
November 21	Bay City High School	Mount Pleasant, MI	W 14–4
	Saginaw Arthur Hill High School		W 35–0
	Alma High School		W 8–4

== 1897 ==
1897 Central Michigan Normalites football
- Conference: Independent
- Record: 2–1
- Head coach: Carl Pray (1st season)

1897 Midwestern college football independents records
	Conf.			Overall
Team	W	L	T	W		L		T
Butler		–		3	–	0	–	0
Fairmount		–		1	–	0	–	0
Washburn		–		7	–	1	–	0
Cincinnati		–		9	–	1	–	1
Iowa State Normal		–		5	–	1	–	0
Ohio Wesleyan		–		7	–	1	–	1
Indiana		–		6	–	1	–	1
Ohio		–		7	–	2	–	0
Carthage		–		3	–	1	–	0
Iowa Agricultural		–		3	–	1	–	0
Notre Dame		–		4	–	1	–	1
Central Michigan		–		2	–	1	–	0
Baldwin–Wallace		–		2	–	1	–	1
Chicago Dental Infirmary		–		2	–	2	–	1
Lake Forest		–		4	–	5	–	1
Drake		–		2	–	3	–	0
Heidelberg		–		2	–	3	–	0
Detroit College		–		1	–	2	–	0
Indiana Normal		–		1	–	4	–	0
Kansas State		–		1	–	2	–	1
Mount Union		–		2	–	4	–	1
Rush Medical College		–		1	–	4	–	1
DePauw		–		2	–	6	–	0
Wittenberg		–		2	–	6	–	0
Haskell		–		1	–	4	–	0
Indiana State Normal		–		1	–	4	–	0
Ohio State		–		1	–	7	–	1
Lincoln (MO)		–		0	–	1	–	0
South Dakota Agricultural		–		0	–	1	–	0
Washington University		–		0	–	2	–	0
North Dakota Agricultural		–		0	–	3	–	0

The 1897 Central Michigan Normalites football team represented Central Michigan Normal School, later renamed Central Michigan University, as an independent during the 1897 college football season. Under head coach Carl Pray, the Normalites compiled a 2–1 record, and were outscored 16 to 18 by their opponents. The most important benchmark during the 1898 season was the program's first game against a collegiate opponent, a 18–0 loss to Alma.

=== Schedule ===
Opponent	Site	Result
Alma	Mount Pleasant, MI	L 0–18
Bay City High School		W 10–0
Ithaca High School		W 6–0

== 1898 ==
1898 Central Michigan Normalites football
- Conference: Independent
- Record: 1–2
- Head coach: Carl Pray (2nd season)

1898 Midwestern college football independents records
	Conf.			Overall
Team	W	L	T	W		L		T
Washington University		–		6	–	0	–	0
Detroit College		–		5	–	0	–	0
Carthage		–		3	–	0	–	0
Lincoln (MO)		–		1	–	0	–	0
Iowa State Normal		–		4	–	0	–	1
Washburn		–		4	–	0	–	1
Kansas		–		7	–	1	–	0
Cincinnati		–		6	–	1	–	2
Indiana		–		4	–	1	–	2
Nebraska		–		8	–	3	–	0
Drake		–		4	–	2	–	0
Lake Forest		–		2	–	1	–	0
Notre Dame		–		4	–	2	–	0
Western Reserve		–		5	–	3	–	0
Butler		–		2	–	1	–	1
Heidelberg		–		4	–	3	–	0
Michigan Agricultural		–		4	–	3	–	0
Iowa State		–		3	–	2	–	0
Kansas State		–		1	–	1	–	2
Miami (OH)		–		1	–	1	–	0
South Dakota Agricultural		–		1	–	1	–	1
DePauw		–		3	–	4	–	2
Iowa		–		3	–	4	–	2
Ohio State		–		3	–	5	–	0
Baldwin–Wallace		–		2	–	4	–	0
Central Michigan		–		1	–	2	–	0
Indiana State Normal		–		1	–	2	–	0
North Dakota Agricultural		–		1	–	2	–	0
Wabash		–		2	–	5	–	1
Ohio Wesleyan		–		2	–	5	–	0
Ohio		–		1	–	3	–	0
Haskell		–		2	–	7	–	0
Missouri		–		1	–	4	–	1
Wittenberg		–		1	–	5	–	1
Fairmount		–		0	–	1	–	0
College of Emporia		–		0	–	2	–	0

The 1898 Central Michigan Normalites football team represented Central Michigan Normal School, later renamed Central Michigan University, as an independent during the 1898 college football season. Under head coach Carl Pray, the Normalites compiled a 1–2 record, but outscored their opponents by a total of 37 to 32.

=== Schedule ===
Opponent	Site	Result
Alma		L 0–27
Mount Pleasant Indian School		W 35–0
Mount Pleasant High School		L 2–5

== 1899 ==
1899 Central Michigan Normalites football
- Conference: Independent
- Record: 3–2
- Head coach: Carl Pray (3rd season)

1899 Midwestern college football independents records
	Conf.			Overall
Team	W	L	T	W		L		T
Kansas		–		10	–	0	–	0
North Dakota		–		6	–	0	–	0
Detroit College		–		5	–	0	–	0
Lincoln (MO)		–		1	–	0	–	0
Ohio State		–		9	–	0	–	1
Iowa		–		8	–	0	–	1
Washington University		–		5	–	1	–	0
Missouri		–		9	–	2	–	0
Chicago P&S		–		4	–	1	–	0
Mount Union		–		5	–	1	–	1
Indiana		–		6	–	2	–	0
South Dakota Agricultural		–		3	–	1	–	0
Wabash		–		1	–	0	–	1
Cincinnati		–		5	–	2	–	0
Drake		–		5	–	2	–	0
Heidelberg		–		5	–	2	–	0
Buchtel		–		2	–	1	–	0
Doane		–		2	–	1	–	0
Northern Illinois State		–		1	–	0	–	2
Notre Dame		–		6	–	3	–	1
Central Michigan		–		3	–	2	–	0
Fairmount		–		2	–	1	–	2
Carthage		–		3	–	2	–	1
Western Reserve		–		5	–	4	–	0
Wittenberg		–		5	–	4	–	0
Iowa State		–		5	–	4	–	1
College of Emporia		–		1	–	1	–	1
Ohio		–		2	–	2	–	0
Ohio Wesleyan		–		5	–	5	–	0
Haskell		–		4	–	5	–	0
Lake Forest		–		4	–	6	–	2
Rush Medical		–		3	–	4	–	0
Kansas State		–		2	–	3	–	0
Iowa State Normal		–		1	–	3	–	2
Washburn		–		2	–	5	–	2
Butler		–		1	–	3	–	0
Miami (OH)		–		1	–	5	–	0
Nebraska		–		1	–	7	–	1
North Dakota Agricultural		–		0	–	1	–	0
Baldwin–Wallace		–		0	–	4	–	0

The 1899 Central Michigan Normalites football team represented Central Michigan Normal School, later renamed Central Michigan University, as an independent during the 1899 college football season. Under head coach Carl Pray, the Normalites compiled a 3–2 record, and outscored their opponents by a total of 35 to 22.

=== Schedule ===
Opponent	Site	Result
Alma		L 0–12
Saginaw All-Stars		L 0–5
Cadillac High School		W 12–0
St. Johns High School		W 17–5
Ferris Institute		W 6–0

== 1900 ==
1900 Central Michigan Normalites football
- Conference: Independent
- Record: 1–0
- Head coach: Unknown

1900 Midwestern college football independents records
	Conf.			Overall
Team	W	L	T	W		L		T
Central Michigan		–		1	–	0	–	0
Lake Forest		–		1	–	0	–	0
Haskell		–		9	–	1	–	0
North Dakota Agricultural		–		8	–	1	–	1
Ohio State		–		8	–	1	–	1
Nebraska		–		6	–	1	–	1
Beloit		–		7	–	1	–	2
Kirksville Osteopaths		–		7	–	2	–	1
Washburn		–		6	–	2	–	0
Wittenberg		–		5	–	2	–	1
Drake		–		6	–	3	–	0
Doane		–		2	–	1	–	0
Notre Dame		–		6	–	3	–	1
Fairmount		–		5	–	3	–	0
Detroit College		–		3	–	2	–	0
South Dakota Agricultural		–		3	–	2	–	0
Washington University		–		3	–	2	–	1
Carthage		–		4	–	3	–	0
Wabash		–		5	–	4	–	0
Lincoln (MO)		–		2	–	2	–	0
Missouri		–		4	–	4	–	1
Northern Illinois State		–		2	–	2	–	2
Iowa State Normal		–		3	–	4	–	1
Buchtel		–		2	–	3	–	1
Cincinnati		–		3	–	5	–	1
Ohio		–		2	–	4	–	1
Kansas State		–		2	–	4	–	0
Kansas		–		2	–	5	–	2
Ohio Wesleyan		–		2	–	5	–	2
Iowa State		–		2	–	5	–	1
Butler		–		0	–	1	–	3
Heidelberg		–		0	–	2	–	2
Chicago P&S		–		1	–	3	–	0
Mount Union		–		1	–	4	–	1
Miami (OH)		–		0	–	4	–	0

The 1900 Central Michigan Normalites football team represented Central Michigan Normal School, later renamed Central Michigan University, as an independent during the 1900 college football season. They only played one game, a 20–5 win against Cadillac High School. Their head coach was unknown.

=== Schedule ===
Opponent	Site	Result
Cadillac High School		W 20–5

== 1902 ==
1902 Central Michigan Normalites football
- Conference: Independent
- Record: 4–0
- Head coach: Charles Tambling (1st season)

1902 Midwestern college football independents records
	Conf.			Overall
Team	W	L	T	W		L		T
Nebraska		–		9	–	0	–	0
South Dakota		–		9	–	0	–	0
North Dakota Agricultural		–		4	–	0	–	0
Central Michigan		–		4	–	0	–	0
Ohio Medical		–		9	–	1	–	0
Marquette		–		6	–	1	–	1
Knox		–		9	–	2	–	0
Northern Illinois State		–		5	–	1	–	1
Haskell		–		8	–	2	–	1
Notre Dame		–		6	–	2	–	1
Drake		–		5	–	2	–	1
Lincoln (MO)		–		2	–	1	–	0
Mount Union		–		6	–	3	–	0
Iowa State		–		6	–	3	–	1
Carthage		–		2	–	1	–	1
Cincinnati		–		4	–	2	–	2
Missouri		–		5	–	3	–	0
Miami (OH)		–		5	–	3	–	1
Kansas		–		6	–	4	–	0
South Dakota Agricultural		–		3	–	2	–	0
Fairmount		–		4	–	3	–	1
Detroit College		–		3	–	3	–	0
Lake Forest		–		4	–	4	–	1
Lincoln (MO)		–		1	–	1	–	0
Western Illinois		–		2	–	2	–	0
Wittenberg		–		3	–	4	–	2
Washburn		–		3	–	4	–	0
Doane		–		2	–	3	–	0
Heidelberg		–		3	–	5	–	1
Wabash		–		2	–	4	–	2
Buchtel		–		2	–	5	–	0
Washington University		–		2	–	6	–	1
Butler		–		1	–	3	–	0
Kansas State		–		2	–	6	–	0
Michigan State Normal		–		1	–	5	–	1
Iowa State Normal		–		1	–	6	–	1
Ohio		–		0	–	5	–	1

The 1902 Central Michigan Normalites football team represented Central Michigan Normal School, later renamed Central Michigan University, as an independent during the 1902 college football season. Their head coach was Charles Tambling. This was part of a ten-game win streak that started in 1902 and ended in 1904.

=== Schedule ===
Date	Opponent	Site	Result
	Mario High School		W 10–0
	McBain High School		W 51–0
November 1	Michigan State Normal	Mount Pleasant, MI (rivalry)	W 10–0
	Ferris Institute	Mount Pleasant, MI	W 11–0

== 1903 ==
1903 Central Michigan Normalites football
- Conference: Independent
- Record: 6–0
- Head coach: Charles Tambling (2nd season)

1903 Midwestern college football independents records
	Conf.			Overall
Team	W	L	T	W		L		T
Nebraska		–		11	–	0	–	0
North Dakota		–		7	–	0	–	0
Central Michigan		–		6	–	0	–	0
Notre Dame		–		8	–	0	–	1
Iowa State		–		8	–	1	–	0
Marquette		–		7	–	1	–	0
Lake Forest		–		6	–	1	–	0
North Dakota Agricultural		–		5	–	1	–	0
Haskell		–		7	–	2	–	0
St. Xavier		–		7	–	2	–	0
Fairmount		–		6	–	2	–	0
Wabash		–		9	–	3	–	0
Wittenberg		–		5	–	2	–	1
Doane		–		2	–	1	–	0
Northern Illinois State		–		4	–	2	–	0
American Medical		–		6	–	3	–	0
Kansas		–		6	–	3	–	0
Drake		–		5	–	3	–	0
Kirksville Osteopaths		–		5	–	3	–	0
Iowa State Normal		–		4	–	3	–	1
Ohio Medical		–		5	–	4	–	0
Lincoln (MO)		–		1	–	1	–	0
Michigan State Normal		–		4	–	4	–	0
Washington University		–		4	–	4	–	2
Heidelberg		–		3	–	4	–	2
Kansas State		–		3	–	4	–	1
Detroit College		–		3	–	4	–	0
Shurtleff		–		2	–	4	–	1
Ohio		–		2	–	4	–	0
South Dakota Agricultural		–		1	–	2	–	0
Mount Union		–		2	–	5	–	1
DePauw		–		2	–	6	–	1
Miami (OH)		–		1	–	4	–	0
Missouri		–		1	–	7	–	1
Western Illinois		–		0	–	3	–	1
Cincinnati		–		1	–	8	–	0
Baldwin–Wallace		–		0	–	1	–	0
Buchtel		–		0	–	2	–	0
Butler		–		0	–	3	–	0
Chicago P&S		–		0	–	4	–	0

The 1903 Central Michigan Normalites football team represented Central Michigan Normal School, later renamed Central Michigan University, as an independent during the 1903 college football season. Their head coach was Charles Tambling. This was part of a ten–game win streak that started in 1902 and ended in 1905.

=== Schedule ===
Opponent	Site	Result
Ferris Institute		W 12–0
Alma		W 23–5
Elsie Giants		W 15–0
Hillsdale		W 7–6
Clare High School		W 6–0?
Mount Pleasant High School		W 6–0?

== 1905 ==
1905 Central Michigan Normalites football
- Conference: Independent
- Record: 7–1
- Head coach: Charles Tambling (3rd season)

1905 Midwestern college football independents records
	Conf.			Overall
Team	W	L	T	W		L		T
Lincoln (MO)		–		3	–	0	–	0
Detroit College		–		1	–	0	–	0
Kansas		–		10	–	1	–	0
Central Michigan		–		7	–	1	–	0
Doane		–		5	–	1	–	0
Nebraska		–		9	–	2	–	0
Saint Louis		–		7	–	2	–	0
Butler		–		7	–	2	–	1
Kansas State		–		6	–	2	–	0
Northern Illinois State		–		3	–	1	–	1
Carthage		–		4	–	2	–	0
Western Illinois		–		4	–	2	–	0
Iowa State		–		6	–	3	–	0
Washington University		–		7	–	3	–	2
Wittenberg		–		7	–	4	–	0
Heidelberg		–		6	–	4	–	0
Iowa State Normal		–		5	–	3	–	2
Cincinnati		–		5	–	3	–	0
Miami (OH)		–		4	–	3	–	0
Missouri		–		5	–	4	–	0
Notre Dame		–		5	–	4	–	0
Fairmount		–		5	–	4	–	1
Haskell		–		5	–	4	–	1
Lake Forest		–		6	–	5	–	0
Wabash		–		6	–	5	–	0
Drake		–		4	–	4	–	0
Michigan State Normal		–		4	–	4	–	0
Marquette		–		3	–	4	–	0
South Dakota State		–		2	–	3	–	0
Ohio		–		2	–	5	–	2
DePauw		–		3	–	6	–	0
Mount Union		–		2	–	6	–	0
North Dakota Agricultural		–		1	–	4	–	1
Baldwin–Wallace		–		0	–	1	–	0
Chicago P&S		–		0	–	1	–	0
St. Mary's (OH)		–		0	–	3	–	0

The 1905 Central Michigan Normalites football team represented Central Michigan Normal School, later renamed Central Michigan University, as an independent during the 1905 college football season. Football returned to the school after having been discontinued for the 1904 season due to budgetary constraints. Charles Tambling was the team's coach. The team compiled a 7–1 record, including victories over Michigan State Normal, later renamed Eastern Michigan University (13–0), the Elsie Giants (5–0), Ferris (35–2 and 10–0), and the Midland Athletic Club (51–0). The team's only loss was suffered on November 4, 1904, by a 12–6 score against Alma College at Mount Pleasant, Michigan.

=== Schedule ===
Date	Opponent	Site	Result	Source
	Elsie Giants		W 5–0	
	Ferris Institute		W 35–2	
	Midland Athletic Club		W 51–0	
November 4	Alma		L 6–12	
November 17	Michigan State Normal	Mount Pleasant, MI (rivalry)	W 13–0	
	Ferris Institute		W 10–0	
	Western State		W 6–0	
	Kalamazoo		W	

== 1907 ==
1907 Central Michigan Normalites football
- Conference: Independent
- Record: 3–3
- Head coach: Ralph Thacker (1st season)

1907 Midwestern college football independents records
	Conf.			Overall
Team	W	L	T	W		L		T
Marquette		–		6	–	0	–	0
North Dakota Agricultural		–		3	–	0	–	0
Lincoln (MO)		–		1	–	0	–	0
Notre Dame		–		6	–	0	–	1
Miami (OH)		–		6	–	1	–	0
Michigan		–		5	–	1	–	0
Mount Union		–		9	–	2	–	0
Fairmount		–		8	–	2	–	0
Iowa State		–		6	–	2	–	0
Lake Forest		–		4	–	1	–	1
South Dakota State		–		5	–	2	–	0
St. Vincent's (IL)		–		5	–	2	–	0
Wabash		–		5	–	2	–	0
Saint Louis		–		7	–	3	–	0
Western State Normal		–		4	–	2	–	1
Kansas State		–		5	–	3	–	0
Michigan State Normal		–		3	–	2	–	0
Wittenberg		–		5	–	4	–	0
Central Michigan		–		3	–	3	–	0
Drake		–		3	–	4	–	1
Ohio		–		3	–	4	–	1
Western Illinois		–		2	–	3	–	0
Franklin		–		3	–	5	–	1
Heidelberg		–		2	–	4	–	1
Butler		–		1	–	3	–	2
Carthage		–		2	–	5	–	0
Haskell		–		2	–	6	–	1
Chicago P&S		–		1	–	3	–	0
Detroit College		–		1	–	3	–	0
Northern Illinois State		–		1	–	4	–	1
Doane		–		1	–	5	–	0
St. Mary's (OH)		–		0	–	4	–	0
Baldwin–Wallace		–		0	–	6	–	0

The 1907 Central Michigan Normalites football team represented Central Michigan Normal School, later renamed Central Michigan University, as an independent during the 1907 college football season. Football was reinstated after one year's absence, and Ralph Thacker, who had played fullback for Olivet College the prior year, was named coach of the football team. Bruce Stickles was selected as the team captain. Although the Central Michigan football media guide reports that the 1907 football team compiled a 2–4 record, including a loss to Alma College, the contemporaneous newspaper report on the Alma game reports it as a victory for Central by a 13 to 0 score. Accordingly, it appears that the correct record of the 1907 football team was 3–3.

=== Schedule ===
Date	Opponent	Site	Result	Source
October 12	at Ferris Institute	Big Rapids, MI	L 0–47	
October 19	Western State Normal	Mount Pleasant, MI (rivalry)	L 0–27	
October 30	Mt. Pleasant Indians		W 13–11	
November 2	Michigan School for the Deaf	Mount Pleasant, MI	W 6–5	
November 16	at Michigan State Normal	Ypsilanti, MI(rivalry)	L 38–0	
November 22	Alma		W 13–0	

== 1908 ==
1908 Central Michigan Normalites football
- Conference: Independent
- Record: 4–3
- Head coach: Hugh Sutherland (1st season)

1908 Midwestern college football independents records
	Conf.			Overall
Team	W	L	T	W		L		T
Kirksville Normal		–		8	–	0	–	0
Miami (OH)		–		7	–	0	–	0
Iowa State Normal		–		5	–	0	–	0
Lincoln (MO)		–		2	–	0	–	0
DePaul		–		7	–	0	–	1
St. Mary's (OH)		–		7	–	0	–	1
Butler		–		5	–	0	–	1
Ohio Northern		–		9	–	1	–	0
Fairmount		–		8	–	1	–	0
Notre Dame		–		8	–	1	–	0
Michigan Agricultural		–		6	–	0	–	2
Lake Forest		–		4	–	1	–	1
Saint Louis		–		6	–	2	–	2
Kansas State		–		6	–	2	–	0
Michigan		–		5	–	2	–	1
Marquette		–		4	–	2	–	1
St. Viator		–		5	–	3	–	0
Central Michigan		–		4	–	3	–	0
Mount Union		–		5	–	4	–	1
Doane		–		4	–	4	–	0
South Dakota State		–		3	–	3	–	1
Buchtel		–		3	–	4	–	0
Western State Normal		–		3	–	4	–	0
Western Illinois		–		2	–	3	–	1
Carthage		–		2	–	3	–	0
Haskell		–		3	–	5	–	1
Wittenberg		–		3	–	5	–	1
Ohio		–		3	–	5	–	0
North Dakota Agricultural		–		2	–	3	–	0
Cincinnati		–		1	–	4	–	1
Wabash		–		2	–	6	–	0
Northern Illinois State		–		1	–	5	–	1
Michigan State Normal		–		1	–	4	–	0
Heidelberg		–		1	–	6	–	0
Franklin		–		0	–	9	–	1
Baldwin–Wallace		–		0	–	2	–	0
Chicago P&S		–		0	–	4	–	0

The 1908 Central Michigan Normalites football team represented Central Michigan Normal School, later renamed Central Michigan University, as an independent during the 1908 college football season. In their first and only season under head coach Hugh Sutherland, the Central Michigan football team compiled a 4–3 record.

=== Schedule ===
Date	Time	Opponent	Site	Result	Source
October 17		at Alma	Alma, MI	L 0–5	
October 31	3:00 p.m.	Alma	Mount Pleasant, MI	W 10–0	
November 7		Michigan State Normal	Mount Pleasant, MI (rivalry)	W 11–0	
November 21	10:00 a.m.	at Western State Normal (MI)	Western State Normal campus; Kalamazoo, MI (rivalry)	L 5–11	
		Elsie Giants		W	
		Hillsdale		L	
		West Branch High School		W	

== 1909 ==
1909 Central Michigan Normalites football
- Conference: Independent
- Record: 4–3
- Head coach: Harry Helmer (1st season)

1909 Midwestern college football independents records
	Conf.			Overall
Team	W	L	T	W		L		T
Iowa State Normal		–		6	–	0	–	0
Notre Dame		–		7	–	0	–	1
Michigan Agricultural		–		8	–	1	–	0
Carthage		–		6	–	1	–	0
Michigan		–		6	–	1	–	0
Western State Normal		–		6	–	1	–	0
Mount Union		–		8	–	2	–	0
Lake Forest		–		5	–	1	–	1
Haskell		–		7	–	2	–	0
Detroit College		–		3	–	1	–	2
Butler		–		5	–	3	–	0
Central Michigan		–		4	–	3	–	0
St. Mary's (OH)		–		4	–	3	–	0
Cincinnati		–		4	–	3	–	1
Doane		–		3	–	2	–	3
Buchtel		–		4	–	4	–	0
Rose Poly		–		4	–	4	–	0
Marquette		–		2	–	2	–	1
North Dakota Agricultural		–		2	–	2	–	1
Wabash		–		3	–	4	–	1
Miami (OH)		–		3	–	4	–	0
Ohio		–		2	–	4	–	2
Saint Louis		–		3	–	5	–	0
Michigan State Normal		–		2	–	4	–	0
Western Illinois		–		1	–	2	–	0
Fairmount		–		2	–	5	–	1
Northern Illinois State		–		2	–	6	–	0
South Dakota State		–		1	–	3	–	0
Heidelberg		–		0	–	7	–	2

The 1909 Central Michigan Normalites football team represented Central Michigan Normal School, later renamed Central Michigan University, as an independent during the 1909 college football season. In their first season under head coachHarry Helmer, the Central Michigan football team compiled a 4–3 record and outscored their opponents by a combined total of 63 to 58.

The team's roster included quarterback Wallace Coutant, halfbacks Emmet Houlihan and Earl McCarty, fullback Ford Bradish, ends Ralph Gilpin and Ollie Richards, guards William Ochs, Alexander Perkins, and Leo Going, tackles Rollie Moody and Floyd L. Livermore, end/fullback George Parkhill, and guard/tackle Harold Spross.

=== Schedule ===
Date	Opponent	Site	Result	Source
	West Branch High School		W 23–0	
October 16	at Arthur Hill High School	Eagle Park; Saginaw, MI	W 8–5	
October 23	at Alma	Alma, MI	W 15–8	
October 30	Michigan Agricultural reserves		L 6–17	
November 5	at Michigan State Normal	Ypsilanti, MI (rivalry)	L 0–17	
November 13	Ferris Institute		W 11–0	
November 19	Western State Normal	Mount Pleasant, MI (rivalry)	L 0–11	
