= 1903 Wabash football team =

American college football season

1903 Wabash football
- Conference: Independent
- Record: 9–3
- Head coach: Ebin Wilson (2nd season)
- Captain: Marshall (halfback)

1903 Midwestern college football independents records
	Conf.			Overall
Team	W	L	T	W		L		T
Nebraska		–		11	–	0	–	0
North Dakota		–		7	–	0	–	0
Central Michigan		–		6	–	0	–	0
Notre Dame		–		8	–	0	–	1
Iowa State		–		8	–	1	–	0
Marquette		–		7	–	1	–	0
Lake Forest		–		6	–	1	–	0
North Dakota Agricultural		–		5	–	1	–	0
Haskell		–		7	–	2	–	0
St. Xavier		–		7	–	2	–	0
Fairmount		–		6	–	2	–	0
Wabash		–		9	–	3	–	0
Wittenberg		–		5	–	2	–	1
Doane		–		2	–	1	–	0
Northern Illinois State		–		4	–	2	–	0
American Medical		–		6	–	3	–	0
Kansas		–		6	–	3	–	0
Drake		–		5	–	3	–	0
Kirksville Osteopaths		–		5	–	3	–	0
Iowa State Normal		–		4	–	3	–	1
Ohio Medical		–		5	–	4	–	0
Lincoln (MO)		–		1	–	1	–	0
Michigan State Normal		–		4	–	4	–	0
Washington University		–		4	–	4	–	2
Heidelberg		–		3	–	4	–	2
Kansas State		–		3	–	4	–	1
Detroit College		–		3	–	4	–	0
Shurtleff		–		2	–	4	–	1
Ohio		–		2	–	4	–	0
South Dakota Agricultural		–		1	–	2	–	0
Mount Union		–		2	–	5	–	1
DePauw		–		2	–	6	–	1
Miami (OH)		–		1	–	4	–	0
Missouri		–		1	–	7	–	1
Western Illinois		–		0	–	3	–	1
Cincinnati		–		1	–	8	–	0
Baldwin–Wallace		–		0	–	1	–	0
Buchtel		–		0	–	2	–	0
Butler		–		0	–	3	–	0
Chicago P&S		–		0	–	4	–	0

The 1903 Wabash football team was an American football team that represented Wabash College as an independent during the 1903 college football season. In Ebin Wilson's second year as head coach, Wabash compiled a 9–3 record and outscored their opponents by a total of 274 to 74. Games for the "Indiana football championship" were recognized as such against Notre Dame, Indiana, Purdue, DePauw, Earlham, and Franklin. Wabash compiled a 3–3 record against championship opponents.

Samuel S. Gordon, an African American student and varsity lineman for Wabash College, faced numerous instances of discrimination in his inaugural season with the Little Giants. In the season opener against Shortridge High School of Indianapolis, Wabash led 12–0 when Gordon was sent in to replace an injured left tackle. Upon seeing this, Captain Clark, right halfback on the Shortridge team, refused to continue play and left the field. According to The Indianapolis Journal, the rest of Clark's team raised no objections, and agreed to continue playing. The crowd was also "bitterly disappointed at the actions of Clark and he was denounced on all sides." On October 6, Rose Polytechnic sent a telegraph to Wabash that relayed their intention to boycott the game if Gordon was allowed to play. Wabash president William Kane responded by cancelling the game with Rose Poly and threatening to do so against any other team who "drew the color line". Head coach Ebin Wilson asserted that they would play Gordon in every game for the remainder of the season, citing his great importance to the Wabash team. On October 20, Hanover also announced that they would not play with the Wabash team with a black man on their roster. Hearing this latest news, Samuel Gordon resigned from the varsity lineup. Wabash accepted the resignation but insisted that they had the right to play any member of their football team, and would make each of their next opponents agree to this before the game could begin. Gordon's resignation lasted three games. He returned as a reserve against Earlham in the last five minutes, and started the entire game against Notre Dame. Samuel Gordon is officially recognized as a letterwinner for the 1903 season.

== Schedule ==
Date	Time	Opponent	Site	Result	Source
September 19		Indianapolis Shortridge High School	Crawfordsville, IN	W 12–0	
September 26	3:00 p.m.	Indiana	Jordan Field; Bloomington, IN	W 5–0	
October 1		Purdue	Crawfordsville, IN	L 0–18	
October 3	3:00 p.m.	Indianapolis Manual Training High School	Crawfordsville, IN	W 21–0	
October 10		at Rose Polytechnic	Terre Haute, IN	Cancelled	
October 10		Culver Military Academy	Culver, IN	W 11–6	
October 17		Central Medical	Crawfordsville, IN	W 31–0	
October 24		Hanover	Hanover, IN	W 51–0	
October 31		Franklin (IN)	Crawfordsville, IN	W 87–5	
November 7		Butler	Indianapolis, IN	W 46–0	
November 14		Earlham	Crawfordsville, IN	L 0–11	
November 21		DePauw	Greencastle, IN	W 10–0	
November 26		Notre Dame	Crawfordsville, IN	L 0–34	
