= 1903 Kirksville Osteopaths football team =

American college football season

1903 Kirksville Osteopaths football
- Conference: Independent
- Record: 5–3
- Head coach: Pat O'Dea (1st season)
- Captain: Craig (left guard)

1903 Midwestern college football independents records
	Conf.			Overall
Team	W	L	T	W		L		T
Nebraska		–		11	–	0	–	0
North Dakota		–		7	–	0	–	0
Central Michigan		–		6	–	0	–	0
Notre Dame		–		8	–	0	–	1
Iowa State		–		8	–	1	–	0
Marquette		–		7	–	1	–	0
Lake Forest		–		6	–	1	–	0
North Dakota Agricultural		–		5	–	1	–	0
Haskell		–		7	–	2	–	0
St. Xavier		–		7	–	2	–	0
Fairmount		–		6	–	2	–	0
Wabash		–		9	–	3	–	0
Wittenberg		–		5	–	2	–	1
Doane		–		2	–	1	–	0
Northern Illinois State		–		4	–	2	–	0
American Medical		–		6	–	3	–	0
Kansas		–		6	–	3	–	0
Drake		–		5	–	3	–	0
Kirksville Osteopaths		–		5	–	3	–	0
Iowa State Normal		–		4	–	3	–	1
Ohio Medical		–		5	–	4	–	0
Lincoln (MO)		–		1	–	1	–	0
Michigan State Normal		–		4	–	4	–	0
Washington University		–		4	–	4	–	2
Heidelberg		–		3	–	4	–	2
Kansas State		–		3	–	4	–	1
Detroit College		–		3	–	4	–	0
Shurtleff		–		2	–	4	–	1
Ohio		–		2	–	4	–	0
South Dakota Agricultural		–		1	–	2	–	0
Mount Union		–		2	–	5	–	1
DePauw		–		2	–	6	–	1
Miami (OH)		–		1	–	4	–	0
Missouri		–		1	–	7	–	1
Western Illinois		–		0	–	3	–	1
Cincinnati		–		1	–	8	–	0
Baldwin–Wallace		–		0	–	1	–	0
Buchtel		–		0	–	2	–	0
Butler		–		0	–	3	–	0
Chicago P&S		–		0	–	4	–	0

The 1903 Kirksville Osteopaths football team was an American football team that represented the American School of Osteopathy, now known as A.T. Still University, in the 1903 college football season.

== Schedule ==
Date	Time	Opponent	Site	Result	Source
September 23		Central (MO)		W 11–0	
September 30		at Illinois	Illinois Field; Champaign, IL	L 0–36	
October 10		Knox	Kirksville, MO	W 17–0	
October 21		at Wisconsin	Randall Field; Madison, WI	L 0–32	
October 24		Still College (IA)	Kirksville, MO	W 74–0	
October 31	3:00 p.m.	at Christian Brothers (MO)	Christian Brothers campus; St. Louis, MO	W 50–0	
November 7		at Notre Dame	Cartier Field; Notre Dame, IN	L 0–28	
		Warrensburg Normal		W 11–0	
