= 1903 Kansas State Aggies football team =

American college football season

1903 Kansas State Aggies football
- Conference: Independent
- Record: 3–4–1
- Head coach: G. O. Dietz (1st season)

1903 Midwestern college football independents records
| | Conf. | | | Overall |
| Team | W | L | T | W | | L | | T |
|---|---|---|---|---|---|---|---|---|
| Nebraska | | – | | 11 | – | 0 | – | 0 |
| North Dakota | | – | | 7 | – | 0 | – | 0 |
| Central Michigan | | – | | 6 | – | 0 | – | 0 |
| Notre Dame | | – | | 8 | – | 0 | – | 1 |
| Iowa State | | – | | 8 | – | 1 | – | 0 |
| Marquette | | – | | 7 | – | 1 | – | 0 |
| Lake Forest | | – | | 6 | – | 1 | – | 0 |
| North Dakota Agricultural | | – | | 5 | – | 1 | – | 0 |
| Haskell | | – | | 7 | – | 2 | – | 0 |
| St. Xavier | | – | | 7 | – | 2 | – | 0 |
| Fairmount | | – | | 6 | – | 2 | – | 0 |
| Wabash | | – | | 9 | – | 3 | – | 0 |
| Wittenberg | | – | | 5 | – | 2 | – | 1 |
| Doane | | – | | 2 | – | 1 | – | 0 |
| Northern Illinois State | | – | | 4 | – | 2 | – | 0 |
| American Medical | | – | | 6 | – | 3 | – | 0 |
| Kansas | | – | | 6 | – | 3 | – | 0 |
| Drake | | – | | 5 | – | 3 | – | 0 |
| Kirksville Osteopaths | | – | | 5 | – | 3 | – | 0 |
| Iowa State Normal | | – | | 4 | – | 3 | – | 1 |
| Ohio Medical | | – | | 5 | – | 4 | – | 0 |
| Lincoln (MO) | | – | | 1 | – | 1 | – | 0 |
| Michigan State Normal | | – | | 4 | – | 4 | – | 0 |
| Washington University | | – | | 4 | – | 4 | – | 2 |
| Heidelberg | | – | | 3 | – | 4 | – | 2 |
| Kansas State | | – | | 3 | – | 4 | – | 1 |
| Detroit College | | – | | 3 | – | 4 | – | 0 |
| Shurtleff | | – | | 2 | – | 4 | – | 1 |
| Ohio | | – | | 2 | – | 4 | – | 0 |
| South Dakota Agricultural | | – | | 1 | – | 2 | – | 0 |
| Mount Union | | – | | 2 | – | 5 | – | 1 |
| DePauw | | – | | 2 | – | 6 | – | 1 |
| Miami (OH) | | – | | 1 | – | 4 | – | 0 |
| Missouri | | – | | 1 | – | 7 | – | 1 |
| Western Illinois | | – | | 0 | – | 3 | – | 1 |
| Cincinnati | | – | | 1 | – | 8 | – | 0 |
| Baldwin–Wallace | | – | | 0 | – | 1 | – | 0 |
| Buchtel | | – | | 0 | – | 2 | – | 0 |
| Butler | | – | | 0 | – | 3 | – | 0 |
| Chicago P&S | | – | | 0 | – | 4 | – | 0 |

The 1903 Kansas State Aggies football team represented Kansas State Agricultural College—now known as Kansas State University—as an independent during the 1903 college football season. Led by G. O. Dietz in his first and only season as head coach, the Aggies compiled a record of 3–4–1.

Dietz succeeded his brother, Cyrus E. Dietz, who coached Kansas State the prior season.

== Schedule ==
| Date | Opponent | Site | Result | Source |
|---|---|---|---|---|
| September 26 | Kansas State Normal | Manhattan, KS | T 0–0 | |
| October 3 | at Kansas | McCook Field; Lawrence, KS (rivalry) | L 0–34 | |
| October 24 | Bethany (KS) | Manhattan, KS | L 0–18 | |
| November 2 | Clyde | Athletic Park; Manhattan, KS | W 11–0 | |
| November 7 | Washburn | Athletic Park; Manhattan, KS | L 0–34 | |
| November 14 | Fort Riley | Athletic Park; Manhattan, KS | W 11–0 | |
| November 21 | College of Emporia | Athletic Park; Manhattan, KS | L 0–11 | |
| November 26 | Haskell second team | Manhattan, KS | W 34–6 | |
