= 1903 North Dakota Flickertails football team =

American college football season

1903 North Dakota Flickertails football
- Conference: Independent
- Record: 7–0
- Head coach: Rex B. Kennedy (1st season)
- Captain: Victor Wardrope

1903 Midwestern college football independents records
	Conf.			Overall
Team	W	L	T	W		L		T
Nebraska		–		11	–	0	–	0
North Dakota		–		7	–	0	–	0
Central Michigan		–		6	–	0	–	0
Notre Dame		–		8	–	0	–	1
Iowa State		–		8	–	1	–	0
Marquette		–		7	–	1	–	0
Lake Forest		–		6	–	1	–	0
North Dakota Agricultural		–		5	–	1	–	0
Haskell		–		7	–	2	–	0
St. Xavier		–		7	–	2	–	0
Fairmount		–		6	–	2	–	0
Wabash		–		9	–	3	–	0
Wittenberg		–		5	–	2	–	1
Doane		–		2	–	1	–	0
Northern Illinois State		–		4	–	2	–	0
American Medical		–		6	–	3	–	0
Kansas		–		6	–	3	–	0
Drake		–		5	–	3	–	0
Kirksville Osteopaths		–		5	–	3	–	0
Iowa State Normal		–		4	–	3	–	1
Ohio Medical		–		5	–	4	–	0
Lincoln (MO)		–		1	–	1	–	0
Michigan State Normal		–		4	–	4	–	0
Washington University		–		4	–	4	–	2
Heidelberg		–		3	–	4	–	2
Kansas State		–		3	–	4	–	1
Detroit College		–		3	–	4	–	0
Shurtleff		–		2	–	4	–	1
Ohio		–		2	–	4	–	0
South Dakota Agricultural		–		1	–	2	–	0
Mount Union		–		2	–	5	–	1
DePauw		–		2	–	6	–	1
Miami (OH)		–		1	–	4	–	0
Missouri		–		1	–	7	–	1
Western Illinois		–		0	–	3	–	1
Cincinnati		–		1	–	8	–	0
Baldwin–Wallace		–		0	–	1	–	0
Buchtel		–		0	–	2	–	0
Butler		–		0	–	3	–	0
Chicago P&S		–		0	–	4	–	0

The 1903 North Dakota Flickertails football team was an American football team that represented the University of North Dakota during the 1903 college football season. The team compiled a 7–0 record and outscored opponents by a total of 274 to 11.

The team was led by first-year head coach Rex B. Kennedy. Victor Wardrope was the team captain for the second of three consecutive years.

== Schedule ==
Date	Opponent	Site	Result
September 28	Moorhead Normal	Grand Forks, ND	W 49–0
October 12	Fargo College	Grand Forks, ND	W 41–0
October 19	at Red River Valley		W 56–0
October 27	Valley City State	Grand Forks, ND	W 16–11
November 2	Winnipeg Shamrocks	Grand Forks, ND	W 56–0
November 7	South Dakota	Grand Forks, ND	W 6–0
November 11	at Fargo College		W 50–0
