= 1903 Notre Dame football team =

American college football season

1903 Notre Dame football
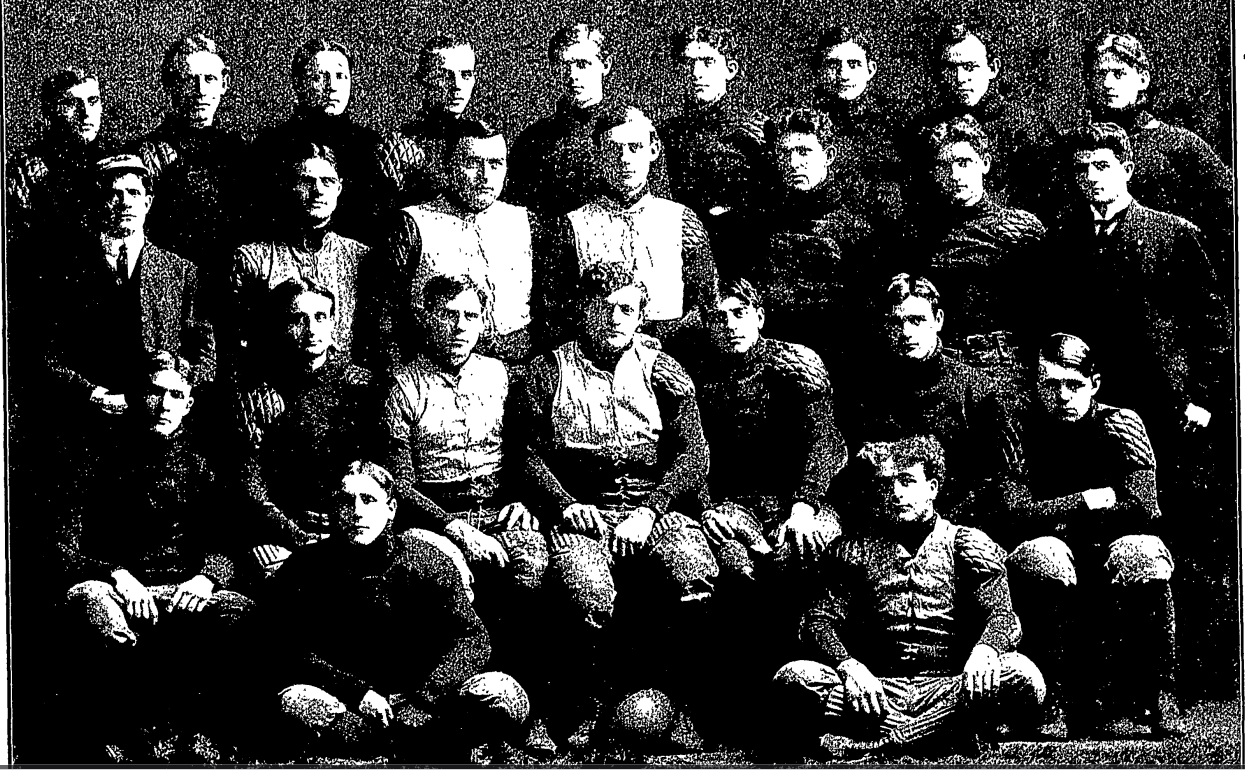
- Conference: Independent
- Record: 8–0–1
- Head coach: James Farragher (2nd season)
- Captain: Louis J. Salmon
- Home stadium: Cartier Field

1903 Midwestern college football independents records
	Conf.			Overall
Team	W	L	T	W		L		T
Nebraska		–		11	–	0	–	0
North Dakota		–		7	–	0	–	0
Central Michigan		–		6	–	0	–	0
Notre Dame		–		8	–	0	–	1
Iowa State		–		8	–	1	–	0
Marquette		–		7	–	1	–	0
Lake Forest		–		6	–	1	–	0
North Dakota Agricultural		–		5	–	1	–	0
Haskell		–		7	–	2	–	0
St. Xavier		–		7	–	2	–	0
Fairmount		–		6	–	2	–	0
Wabash		–		9	–	3	–	0
Wittenberg		–		5	–	2	–	1
Doane		–		2	–	1	–	0
Northern Illinois State		–		4	–	2	–	0
American Medical		–		6	–	3	–	0
Kansas		–		6	–	3	–	0
Drake		–		5	–	3	–	0
Kirksville Osteopaths		–		5	–	3	–	0
Iowa State Normal		–		4	–	3	–	1
Ohio Medical		–		5	–	4	–	0
Lincoln (MO)		–		1	–	1	–	0
Michigan State Normal		–		4	–	4	–	0
Washington University		–		4	–	4	–	2
Heidelberg		–		3	–	4	–	2
Kansas State		–		3	–	4	–	1
Detroit College		–		3	–	4	–	0
Shurtleff		–		2	–	4	–	1
Ohio		–		2	–	4	–	0
South Dakota Agricultural		–		1	–	2	–	0
Mount Union		–		2	–	5	–	1
DePauw		–		2	–	6	–	1
Miami (OH)		–		1	–	4	–	0
Missouri		–		1	–	7	–	1
Western Illinois		–		0	–	3	–	1
Cincinnati		–		1	–	8	–	0
Baldwin–Wallace		–		0	–	1	–	0
Buchtel		–		0	–	2	–	0
Butler		–		0	–	3	–	0
Chicago P&S		–		0	–	4	–	0

The 1903 Notre Dame football team was an American football team that represented the University of Notre Dame as an independent during the 1903 college football season. In its second and final season under head coach James Farragher, the team compiled an 8–0–1 record, shut out every opponent, and outscored all opponents by a total of 291 to 0. Against major opponents, the team defeated Michigan Agricultural (12–0) and played Northwestern to a scoreless tie.

== Schedule ==
Date	Opponent	Site	Result	Source
October 3	Michigan Agricultural	Cartier Field; Notre Dame, IN (rivalry)	W 12–0	
October 10	Lake Forest	Cartier Field; Notre Dame, IN	W 28–0	
October 17	at DePauw	Greencastle, IN	W 56–0	
October 24	American Medical	Cartier Field; Notre Dame, IN	W 52–0	
October 29	Chicago Physicians & Surgeons	Cartier Field; Notre Dame, IN	W 46–0	
November 7	Kirksville Osteopaths	Cartier Field; Notre Dame, IN	W 28–0	
November 14	vs. Northwestern	South Side Park; Chicago, IL (rivalry)	T 0–0	
November 21	vs. Ohio Medical	Toledo, OH	W 35–0	
November 26	at Wabash	Crawfordsville, IN	W 34–0	
