= 1903 Nebraska Cornhuskers football team =

American college football season

1903 Nebraska Cornhuskers football
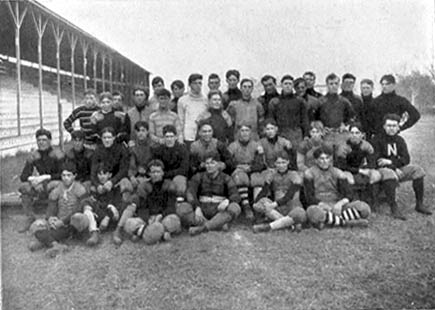
- Conference: Independent
- Record: 10–0
- Head coach: Walter C. Booth (4th season)
- Captain: John R. Bender
- Home stadium: Antelope Field

1903 Midwestern college football independents records
	Conf.			Overall
Team	W	L	T	W		L		T
Nebraska		–		11	–	0	–	0
North Dakota		–		7	–	0	–	0
Central Michigan		–		6	–	0	–	0
Notre Dame		–		8	–	0	–	1
Iowa State		–		8	–	1	–	0
Marquette		–		7	–	1	–	0
Lake Forest		–		6	–	1	–	0
North Dakota Agricultural		–		5	–	1	–	0
Haskell		–		7	–	2	–	0
St. Xavier		–		7	–	2	–	0
Fairmount		–		6	–	2	–	0
Wabash		–		9	–	3	–	0
Wittenberg		–		5	–	2	–	1
Doane		–		2	–	1	–	0
Northern Illinois State		–		4	–	2	–	0
American Medical		–		6	–	3	–	0
Kansas		–		6	–	3	–	0
Drake		–		5	–	3	–	0
Kirksville Osteopaths		–		5	–	3	–	0
Iowa State Normal		–		4	–	3	–	1
Ohio Medical		–		5	–	4	–	0
Lincoln (MO)		–		1	–	1	–	0
Michigan State Normal		–		4	–	4	–	0
Washington University		–		4	–	4	–	2
Heidelberg		–		3	–	4	–	2
Kansas State		–		3	–	4	–	1
Detroit College		–		3	–	4	–	0
Shurtleff		–		2	–	4	–	1
Ohio		–		2	–	4	–	0
South Dakota Agricultural		–		1	–	2	–	0
Mount Union		–		2	–	5	–	1
DePauw		–		2	–	6	–	1
Miami (OH)		–		1	–	4	–	0
Missouri		–		1	–	7	–	1
Western Illinois		–		0	–	3	–	1
Cincinnati		–		1	–	8	–	0
Baldwin–Wallace		–		0	–	1	–	0
Buchtel		–		0	–	2	–	0
Butler		–		0	–	3	–	0
Chicago P&S		–		0	–	4	–	0

The 1903 Nebraska Cornhuskers football team represented the University of Nebraska as an independent during the 1903 college football season. Led by fourth-year head coach Walter C. Booth, the Cornhuskers compiled a record of 10–0, excluding one exhibition game. Nebraska played home games at Antelope Field in Lincoln, Nebraska.

Nebraska went undefeated for the second straight season, setting a new program record with 22 consecutive victories. One newspaper of the time wrote "Nebraska occupies a unique position in western football. Too strong to find fearful competitors, the Cornhuskers can almost weep with Alexander the Great because they have no more teams to conquer."

== Schedule ==
Date	Opponent	Site	Result	Attendance	Source
September 19	Lincoln High School	Antelope Field; Lincoln, NE	W 23–6 (exhibition)		
September 26	Grand Island	Antelope Field; Lincoln, NE	W 64–0		
October 3	South Dakota	Antelope Field; Lincoln, NE	W 23–0		
October 10	at Denver	Denver, CO	W 10–0		
October 17	Haskell	Antelope Field; Lincoln, NE	W 16–0	3,000	
October 24	Colorado	Antelope Field; Lincoln, NE (rivalry)	W 31–0		
October 31	at Iowa	Iowa Field; Iowa City, IA (rivalry)	W 17–6		
November 7	Knox (IL)	Antelope Field; Lincoln, NE	W 33–5		
November 14	at Kansas	Central Park; Lawrence, KS (rivalry)	W 6–0		
November 21	Bellevue	Antelope Field; Lincoln, NE	W 52–0		
November 26	Illinois	Antelope Field; Lincoln, NE	W 16–0		

== Coaching staff ==
Coach	Position	First year	Alma mater
Walter C. Booth	Head coach	1900	Princeton
John Westover	Assistant coach	1904	Nebraska
Jack Best	Trainer	1890	Nebraska

== Roster ==
Bell, Johnny HB
Bender, John R. HB
Benedict, Maurice QB
Borg, Charles C
Briggs LT
Clark PLAYER
Cortelyou, Spencer E
Cotton, Charles RG
Eager, Earl HB
Engelhart, William FB
Follmer, Eugene E
Graves, Elliot HB
Hunter, Fred RG
Lantz HB
Lesh, W.W. G
Marsh, Earl HB
Mason, Cyrus LT
Mason, John FB
Mickel, Oliver FB
Perry, F.D. T
Ringer, John LG
Robertson, Claud RT
Shedd, Charlie E
Thorpe, Orley E
Tobin, John G
Wilson, Harry LT

== Game summaries ==
=== Lincoln High ===
Lincoln High at Nebraska

Team	1	2	Total
Lincoln High			6
• Nebraska			23

- Date: September 19
- Location: Antelope Field, Lincoln, NE

In their sixth exhibition meeting, the Lincoln high schoolers managed to put points on the board against the Cornhuskers for the first time, remarkably ending Nebraska's run of 10 straight shutout victories. Unsurprisingly, though, the University put up more, and pushed the perfect series record to 6–0.

=== Grand Island ===
Grand Island at Nebraska

Team	1	2	Total
Grand Island			0
• Nebraska			64

- Date: September 26
- Location: Antelope Field, Lincoln, NE

Nebraska amassed nearly 800 yards of offense against Grand Island in the first meeting between the schools, the tenth straight shutout by the Cornhuskers defense.

=== South Dakota ===
South Dakota at Nebraska

Team	1	2	Total
South Dakota			0
• Nebraska			23

- Date: October 3
- Location: Antelope Field, Lincoln, NE

Nebraska faced South Dakota for the first time in four years, dominating the Coyotes.

=== At Denver ===
Nebraska at Denver

Team	1	2	Total
• Nebraska	0	10	10
Denver	0	0	0

- Date: October 10
- Location: Denver, CO

Nebraska had 685 yards of offense to Denver's 15 in the first meeting between the schools. Frequent turnovers and a muddy playing surface likely prevented the Cornhuskers from scoring more than ten points.

=== Haskell ===
Haskell at Nebraska

Team	1	2	Total
Haskell			0
• Nebraska			16

- Date: October 17
- Location: Antelope Field, Lincoln, NE
- Game attendance: 3,000

Nebraska dominated Haskell in the 100th game in NU history. Some historical records mention this as the first game in which a Nebraska mascot appeared, in this case a bulldog wearing a scarlet and cream blanket, though records suggest NU may have used a white bull terrier painted half red as a mascot as far back as 1893.

=== Colorado ===
Colorado at Nebraska

Team	1	2	Total
Colorado			0
• Nebraska			31

- Date: October 24
- Location: Antelope Field, Lincoln, NE

Nebraska outgained Colorado 314 to 37 in the third game of the rivalry.

=== At Iowa ===
Nebraska at Iowa

Team	1	2	Total
• Nebraska			17
Iowa			6

- Date: October 31
- Location: Iowa City, IA

After three years without facing the Hawkeyes, Nebraska traveled to Iowa City for the first time. Nebraska's 14-game shutout streak ended after a fumble and penalty allowed Iowa to punch in a touchdown from NU's 2-yard line. Nebraska still won the game for its 18th straight victory.

=== Knox ===
Knox at Nebraska

Team	1	2	Total
Knox			5
• Nebraska			33

- Date: November 7
- Location: Antelope Field, Lincoln, NE

=== Kansas ===
Nebraska at Kansas

Team	1	2	Total
• Nebraska	0	6	6
Kansas	0	0	0

- Date: November 14
- Location: Central Park, Lawrence, KS

Kansas presented the stiffest challenge of the season for the Cornhuskers, who did not score until minutes remained in the game. That touchdown was enough to win as NU shut out the Jayhawks 6–0.

=== Bellevue ===
Bellevue at Nebraska

Team	1	2	Total
Bellevue			0
• Nebraska			52

- Date: November 21
- Location: Antelope Field, Lincoln, NE

=== Illinois ===
Illinois at Nebraska

Team	1	2	Total
Illinois	0	0	0
• Nebraska	0	16	16

- Date: November 26
- Location: Antelope Field, Lincoln, NE

Nebraska managed just 58 yards in a scoreless first half, but the Cornhuskers produced 276 yards and 16 points in the second half to defeat the Fighting Illini.
