= 1903 Missouri Tigers football team =

American college football season

1903 Missouri Tigers football
- Conference: Independent
- Record: 1–7–1
- Head coach: John McLean (1st season)
- Captain: Abner Birney
- Home stadium: Rollins Field

1903 Midwestern college football independents records
	Conf.			Overall
Team	W	L	T	W		L		T
Nebraska		–		11	–	0	–	0
North Dakota		–		7	–	0	–	0
Central Michigan		–		6	–	0	–	0
Notre Dame		–		8	–	0	–	1
Iowa State		–		8	–	1	–	0
Marquette		–		7	–	1	–	0
Lake Forest		–		6	–	1	–	0
North Dakota Agricultural		–		5	–	1	–	0
Haskell		–		7	–	2	–	0
St. Xavier		–		7	–	2	–	0
Fairmount		–		6	–	2	–	0
Wabash		–		9	–	3	–	0
Wittenberg		–		5	–	2	–	1
Doane		–		2	–	1	–	0
Northern Illinois State		–		4	–	2	–	0
American Medical		–		6	–	3	–	0
Kansas		–		6	–	3	–	0
Drake		–		5	–	3	–	0
Kirksville Osteopaths		–		5	–	3	–	0
Iowa State Normal		–		4	–	3	–	1
Ohio Medical		–		5	–	4	–	0
Lincoln (MO)		–		1	–	1	–	0
Michigan State Normal		–		4	–	4	–	0
Washington University		–		4	–	4	–	2
Heidelberg		–		3	–	4	–	2
Kansas State		–		3	–	4	–	1
Detroit College		–		3	–	4	–	0
Shurtleff		–		2	–	4	–	1
Ohio		–		2	–	4	–	0
South Dakota Agricultural		–		1	–	2	–	0
Mount Union		–		2	–	5	–	1
DePauw		–		2	–	6	–	1
Miami (OH)		–		1	–	4	–	0
Missouri		–		1	–	7	–	1
Western Illinois		–		0	–	3	–	1
Cincinnati		–		1	–	8	–	0
Baldwin–Wallace		–		0	–	1	–	0
Buchtel		–		0	–	2	–	0
Butler		–		0	–	3	–	0
Chicago P&S		–		0	–	4	–	0

The 1903 Missouri Tigers football team was an American football team that represented the University of Missouri as an independent during the 1903 college football season. The team compiled a 1–7–1 record and was outscored by its opponents by a combined total of 83 to 46. John McLean was the head coach for the first of three seasons. The team played its home games at Rollins Field in Columbia, Missouri.

== Schedule ==
Date	Time	Opponent	Site	Result	Attendance	Source
October 3		Missouri Mines	Rollins Field; Columbia, MO	W 40–0		
October 12		Grinnell	Rollins Field; Columbia, MO	L 6–15		
October 17		Drake	Rollins Field; Columbia, MO	L 0–17		
October 23		Simpson	Rollins Field; Columbia, MO	L 0–12		
October 31	3:00 p.m.	vs. Haskell	Association Park; Kansas City, MO	L 0–12		
November 7		at Washington University	League Park; St. Louis, MO	T 0–0	8,000	
November 14		Iowa	Rollins Field; Columbia, MO	L 0–16		
November 18		Washburn	Rollins Field; Columbia, MO	L 0–6		
November 26		vs. Kansas	Sportsman's Park; Kansas City, MO (rivalry)	L 0–5	10,000	
