= 1903 Michigan State Normal Normalites football team =

American college football season

1903 Michigan State Normal Normalites football
- Conference: Independent
- Record: 4–4
- Head coach: Hunter Forest (1st season)
- Captain: Guy E. Bates

1903 Midwestern college football independents records
	Conf.			Overall
Team	W	L	T	W		L		T
Nebraska		–		11	–	0	–	0
North Dakota		–		7	–	0	–	0
Central Michigan		–		6	–	0	–	0
Notre Dame		–		8	–	0	–	1
Iowa State		–		8	–	1	–	0
Marquette		–		7	–	1	–	0
Lake Forest		–		6	–	1	–	0
North Dakota Agricultural		–		5	–	1	–	0
Haskell		–		7	–	2	–	0
St. Xavier		–		7	–	2	–	0
Fairmount		–		6	–	2	–	0
Wabash		–		9	–	3	–	0
Wittenberg		–		5	–	2	–	1
Doane		–		2	–	1	–	0
Northern Illinois State		–		4	–	2	–	0
American Medical		–		6	–	3	–	0
Kansas		–		6	–	3	–	0
Drake		–		5	–	3	–	0
Kirksville Osteopaths		–		5	–	3	–	0
Iowa State Normal		–		4	–	3	–	1
Ohio Medical		–		5	–	4	–	0
Lincoln (MO)		–		1	–	1	–	0
Michigan State Normal		–		4	–	4	–	0
Washington University		–		4	–	4	–	2
Heidelberg		–		3	–	4	–	2
Kansas State		–		3	–	4	–	1
Detroit College		–		3	–	4	–	0
Shurtleff		–		2	–	4	–	1
Ohio		–		2	–	4	–	0
South Dakota Agricultural		–		1	–	2	–	0
Mount Union		–		2	–	5	–	1
DePauw		–		2	–	6	–	1
Miami (OH)		–		1	–	4	–	0
Missouri		–		1	–	7	–	1
Western Illinois		–		0	–	3	–	1
Cincinnati		–		1	–	8	–	0
Baldwin–Wallace		–		0	–	1	–	0
Buchtel		–		0	–	2	–	0
Butler		–		0	–	3	–	0
Chicago P&S		–		0	–	4	–	0

The 1903 Michigan State Normal Normalites football team represented Michigan State Normal College (later renamed Eastern Michigan University) as an independent during the 1903 college football season. In their first and only season under head coach Hunter Forest, the Normalites compiled a record of 4–4 and were outscored by a combined total of 88 to 78. Guy E. Bates was the team captain.

== Schedule ==
Date	Opponent	Site	Result	Source
October 10	at Detroit College	Detroit Athletic Club field; Detroit, MI	L 0–6	
October 17	at Mt. Clemens	Mount Clemens, MI	L 0–23	
October 24	Olivet	Ypsilanti, MI	L 0–41	
October 31	Detroit Business University	Ypsilanti, MI	W 10–6	
November 7	at Adrian	Adrian, MI	W 16–0	
November 12	Detroit College	Ypsilanti, MI	W 5–0	
November 14	at Hillsdale	Hillsdale, MI	L 11–12	
November 21	Adrian	Ypsilanti, MI	W 36–0	
