= 1903 North Dakota Agricultural Aggies football team =

American college football season

1903 North Dakota Agricultural Aggies football
- Conference: Independent
- Record: 5–1
- Head coach: Eddie Cochems (2nd season)
- Captain: Charles Rose

1903 Midwestern college football independents records
	Conf.			Overall
Team	W	L	T	W		L		T
Nebraska		–		11	–	0	–	0
North Dakota		–		7	–	0	–	0
Central Michigan		–		6	–	0	–	0
Notre Dame		–		8	–	0	–	1
Iowa State		–		8	–	1	–	0
Marquette		–		7	–	1	–	0
Lake Forest		–		6	–	1	–	0
North Dakota Agricultural		–		5	–	1	–	0
Haskell		–		7	–	2	–	0
St. Xavier		–		7	–	2	–	0
Fairmount		–		6	–	2	–	0
Wabash		–		9	–	3	–	0
Wittenberg		–		5	–	2	–	1
Doane		–		2	–	1	–	0
Northern Illinois State		–		4	–	2	–	0
American Medical		–		6	–	3	–	0
Kansas		–		6	–	3	–	0
Drake		–		5	–	3	–	0
Kirksville Osteopaths		–		5	–	3	–	0
Iowa State Normal		–		4	–	3	–	1
Ohio Medical		–		5	–	4	–	0
Lincoln (MO)		–		1	–	1	–	0
Michigan State Normal		–		4	–	4	–	0
Washington University		–		4	–	4	–	2
Heidelberg		–		3	–	4	–	2
Kansas State		–		3	–	4	–	1
Detroit College		–		3	–	4	–	0
Shurtleff		–		2	–	4	–	1
Ohio		–		2	–	4	–	0
South Dakota Agricultural		–		1	–	2	–	0
Mount Union		–		2	–	5	–	1
DePauw		–		2	–	6	–	1
Miami (OH)		–		1	–	4	–	0
Missouri		–		1	–	7	–	1
Western Illinois		–		0	–	3	–	1
Cincinnati		–		1	–	8	–	0
Baldwin–Wallace		–		0	–	1	–	0
Buchtel		–		0	–	2	–	0
Butler		–		0	–	3	–	0
Chicago P&S		–		0	–	4	–	0

The 1903 North Dakota Agricultural Aggies football team was an American football team that represented North Dakota Agricultural College (now known as North Dakota State University) as an independent during the 1903 college football season. In its second and final season under head coach Eddie Cochems, the team compiled a 5–1 record and outscored opponents by a total of 331 to 49.

The season was part of a three-year, 17-game winning streak that began on November 19, 1900, and ended on November 21, 1903.

== Schedule ==
Date	Opponent	Site	Result	Source
October 10	Barnesville High School	Fargo, ND	W 72–0	
October 19	South Dakota Agricultural	Fargo, ND (rivalry)	W 85–0	
October 26	Hamline	Fargo, ND	W 47–0	
November 2	Minnesota	Fargo, ND	L 0–11	
November 10	South Dakota	Fargo, ND	W 22–0	
November 17	at Flandreau Indian School	Flandreau, SD	W 105–0	
