= 1903 Kansas Jayhawks football team =

American college football season

1903 Kansas Jayhawks football
- Conference: Independent
- Record: 6–3
- Head coach: Boss Weeks (1st season)
- Captain: Alpha Brumage
- Home stadium: McCook Field

1903 Midwestern college football independents records
	Conf.			Overall
Team	W	L	T	W		L		T
Nebraska		–		11	–	0	–	0
North Dakota		–		7	–	0	–	0
Central Michigan		–		6	–	0	–	0
Notre Dame		–		8	–	0	–	1
Iowa State		–		8	–	1	–	0
Marquette		–		7	–	1	–	0
Lake Forest		–		6	–	1	–	0
North Dakota Agricultural		–		5	–	1	–	0
Haskell		–		7	–	2	–	0
St. Xavier		–		7	–	2	–	0
Fairmount		–		6	–	2	–	0
Wabash		–		9	–	3	–	0
Wittenberg		–		5	–	2	–	1
Doane		–		2	–	1	–	0
Northern Illinois State		–		4	–	2	–	0
American Medical		–		6	–	3	–	0
Kansas		–		6	–	3	–	0
Drake		–		5	–	3	–	0
Kirksville Osteopaths		–		5	–	3	–	0
Iowa State Normal		–		4	–	3	–	1
Ohio Medical		–		5	–	4	–	0
Lincoln (MO)		–		1	–	1	–	0
Michigan State Normal		–		4	–	4	–	0
Washington University		–		4	–	4	–	2
Heidelberg		–		3	–	4	–	2
Kansas State		–		3	–	4	–	1
Detroit College		–		3	–	4	–	0
Shurtleff		–		2	–	4	–	1
Ohio		–		2	–	4	–	0
South Dakota Agricultural		–		1	–	2	–	0
Mount Union		–		2	–	5	–	1
DePauw		–		2	–	6	–	1
Miami (OH)		–		1	–	4	–	0
Missouri		–		1	–	7	–	1
Western Illinois		–		0	–	3	–	1
Cincinnati		–		1	–	8	–	0
Baldwin–Wallace		–		0	–	1	–	0
Buchtel		–		0	–	2	–	0
Butler		–		0	–	3	–	0
Chicago P&S		–		0	–	4	–	0

The 1903 Kansas Jayhawks football team was an American football team that represented the University of Kansas as an independent during the 1903 college football season. In January 1903, Kansas hired Boss Weeks, who was the quarterback of Fielding H. Yost's 1901 and 1902 "Point-a-Minute" teams at Michigan, as its new head coach. In their only season under Weeks, the Jayhawks compiled a 6–3 record and outscored opponents by a combined total of 118 to 39. The Jayhawks played home games at McCook Field in Lawrence, Kansas. Alpha Brumage was the team captain.

== Schedule ==
Date	Opponent	Site	Result	Attendance	Source
September 28	College of Emporia	McCook Field; Lawrence, KS	W 34–0		
October 3	Kansas State	McCook Field; Lawrence, KS (rivalry)	W 34–0		
October 10	Kansas State Normal	McCook Field; Lawrence, KS	W 12–0		
October 17	at Colorado	Gamble Field; Boulder, CO	W 12–11		
October 24	Haskell	McCook Field; Lawrence, KS	L 6–12		
October 31	at Washburn	Topeka, KS	L 0–5		
November 7	Oklahoma	McCook Field; Lawrence, KS	W 17–5		
November 14	Nebraska	McCook Field; Lawrence, KS (rivalry)	L 0–6		
November 26	vs. Missouri	Sportsman's Park; Kansas City, MO (rivalry)	W 5–0	10,000	
