= 1903 Ohio Medical football team =

American college football season

1903 Ohio Medical football
- Conference: Independent
- Record: 5–4

1903 Midwestern college football independents records
	Conf.			Overall
Team	W	L	T	W		L		T
Nebraska		–		11	–	0	–	0
North Dakota		–		7	–	0	–	0
Central Michigan		–		6	–	0	–	0
Notre Dame		–		8	–	0	–	1
Iowa State		–		8	–	1	–	0
Marquette		–		7	–	1	–	0
Lake Forest		–		6	–	1	–	0
North Dakota Agricultural		–		5	–	1	–	0
Haskell		–		7	–	2	–	0
St. Xavier		–		7	–	2	–	0
Fairmount		–		6	–	2	–	0
Wabash		–		9	–	3	–	0
Wittenberg		–		5	–	2	–	1
Doane		–		2	–	1	–	0
Northern Illinois State		–		4	–	2	–	0
American Medical		–		6	–	3	–	0
Kansas		–		6	–	3	–	0
Drake		–		5	–	3	–	0
Kirksville Osteopaths		–		5	–	3	–	0
Iowa State Normal		–		4	–	3	–	1
Ohio Medical		–		5	–	4	–	0
Lincoln (MO)		–		1	–	1	–	0
Michigan State Normal		–		4	–	4	–	0
Washington University		–		4	–	4	–	2
Heidelberg		–		3	–	4	–	2
Kansas State		–		3	–	4	–	1
Detroit College		–		3	–	4	–	0
Shurtleff		–		2	–	4	–	1
Ohio		–		2	–	4	–	0
South Dakota Agricultural		–		1	–	2	–	0
Mount Union		–		2	–	5	–	1
DePauw		–		2	–	6	–	1
Miami (OH)		–		1	–	4	–	0
Missouri		–		1	–	7	–	1
Western Illinois		–		0	–	3	–	1
Cincinnati		–		1	–	8	–	0
Baldwin–Wallace		–		0	–	1	–	0
Buchtel		–		0	–	2	–	0
Butler		–		0	–	3	–	0
Chicago P&S		–		0	–	4	–	0

The 1903 Ohio Medical football team was an American football team that represented the Ohio State University College of Medicine in the 1903 college football season.

== Schedule ==
Date	Opponent	Site	Result	Source
September 26	Denison	Columbus, OH	W 16–0	
October 3	Ohio Wesleyan	Delaware, OH	W 26–0	
October 10	Heidelberg (OH)	Columbus, OH	W 36–0	
October 16	Otterbein	Columbus, OH	W 24–0	
October 24	Shelby Athletic Club	Shelby, OH	L 0–11	
October 31	Washington & Jefferson	Washington, PA	W 0–36	
November 7	Case	Columbus, OH	L 0–17	
November 21	vs. Notre Dame	Toledo, OH	L 0–35	
November 26	Kenyon	Columbus, OH	W 18–10	
