= 1908 Phillips Haymakers football team =

American college football season

1908 Phillips Haymakers football
- Conference: Independent
- Record: 1–1–1

The 1908 Phillips Haymakers football team represented Phillips University during the 1908 college football season. In their first season of football, the Haymakers compiled a record of 1–1–1.

== Schedule ==
| Date | Opponent | Site | Result | Source |
|---|---|---|---|---|
| October 3 | Tonkawa | Enid, OK | W 5–0 | |
| October 26 | Fairmount | Enid, OK | L 0–17 | |
| ? | Northwestern Territorial Normal School | | T 6–6 | |
