= Clifford Bell =

Clifford Bell may refer to:

- Cliff Bell (1896–1952), American pitcher in Negro league baseball
- Clifford Bell (American football) (1880–1936), American football player and coach
