= Dwight Bradley =

American football and basketball coach

Coaching career (HC unless noted)

Football
- 1908: Buchtel

Basketball
- 1908–1909: Buchtel

Head coaching record
- Overall: 3–4 (football); 0–1 (basketball)

Dwight Bradley was an American college football and college basketball coach. He served as the head football coach at Buchtel College—now known as the University of Akron—for one season in 1908, compiling a record of 3–4. Bradley also coached the men's basketball team at Buchtel for one game that year, tallying a mark of 1–0. Walter East coached the basketball squad for the remainder of that season. Bradley was a graduate of the University of Pennsylvania.

== Head coaching record ==
=== Football ===
Year	Team	Overall	Conference	Standing	Bowl/playoffs
Buchtel (Independent) (1908)
1908	Buchtel	3–4			
Buchtel:		3–4			
Total:		3–4			

=== Basketball ===
Record table
Season	Team	Overall	Conference	Standing	Postseason
Buchtel (Independent) (1908–1909)
1908–09	Buchtel	1–0 (Note: Walter East coached the basketball squad for the remainder of the 1908–09 season.)			
Buchtel:		1–0			
Total:		1–0			
