= Ralph Inott =

American football player and coach (1884–1945)

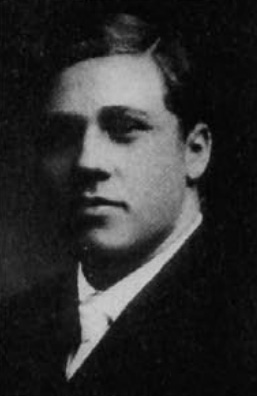
- Inott pictured in The Cincinnatian 1907, Cincinnati yearbook

Biographical details
- Born: July 15, 1884; Cincinnati, Ohio, U.S.
- Died: October 27, 1945 (aged 61); Pecos, New Mexico, U.S.

Playing career

Football
- 1904–1907: Cincinnati

Coaching career (HC unless noted)

Football
- 1908: Cincinnati

Baseball
- 1908–1909: Cincinnati

Head coaching record
- Overall: 1–4–1 (football)

Ralph Herbert Inott (July 15, 1884 – October 27, 1945) was an American football and baseball coach. He served as the head football coach at the University of Cincinnati for one season, in 1908, compiling a record of 1–4–1. Inott was also the head baseball coach at Cincinnati from 1908 to 1909.

Inott was born in 1884 in Cincinnati, Ohio. In 1907, he married Isabel Henderson Burns. The couple later resided in New Mexico. He died on October 27, 1945, of a heart attack at his home in Pecos, New Mexico. He was cremated after a funeral on October 30, 1945.

== Head coaching record ==
=== Football ===
Year	Team	Overall	Conference	Standing	Bowl/playoffs
Cincinnati (Independent) (1908)
1908	Cincinnati	1–4–1			
Cincinnati:		1–4–1			
Total:		1–4–1			
