= 1908 Kirksville Normal football team =

American college football season

1908 Kirksville Normal football
- Conference: Independent
- Record: 8–0
- Head coach: Clifford Bell (2nd season)
- Home stadium: Normal Athletic Field

1908 Midwestern college football independents records
	Conf.			Overall
Team	W	L	T	W		L		T
Kirksville Normal		–		8	–	0	–	0
Miami (OH)		–		7	–	0	–	0
Iowa State Normal		–		5	–	0	–	0
Lincoln (MO)		–		2	–	0	–	0
DePaul		–		7	–	0	–	1
St. Mary's (OH)		–		7	–	0	–	1
Butler		–		5	–	0	–	1
Ohio Northern		–		9	–	1	–	0
Fairmount		–		8	–	1	–	0
Notre Dame		–		8	–	1	–	0
Michigan Agricultural		–		6	–	0	–	2
Lake Forest		–		4	–	1	–	1
Saint Louis		–		6	–	2	–	2
Kansas State		–		6	–	2	–	0
Michigan		–		5	–	2	–	1
Marquette		–		4	–	2	–	1
St. Viator		–		5	–	3	–	0
Central Michigan		–		4	–	3	–	0
Mount Union		–		5	–	4	–	1
Doane		–		4	–	4	–	0
South Dakota State		–		3	–	3	–	1
Buchtel		–		3	–	4	–	0
Western State Normal		–		3	–	4	–	0
Western Illinois		–		2	–	3	–	1
Carthage		–		2	–	3	–	0
Haskell		–		3	–	5	–	1
Wittenberg		–		3	–	5	–	1
Ohio		–		3	–	5	–	0
North Dakota Agricultural		–		2	–	3	–	0
Cincinnati		–		1	–	4	–	1
Wabash		–		2	–	6	–	0
Northern Illinois State		–		1	–	5	–	1
Michigan State Normal		–		1	–	4	–	0
Heidelberg		–		1	–	6	–	0
Franklin		–		0	–	9	–	1
Baldwin–Wallace		–		0	–	2	–	0
Chicago P&S		–		0	–	4	–	0

The 1908 Kirksville Normal football team represented the Kirksville Normal School of Kirksville, Missouri (later renamed as Truman State University) as an independent during the 1908 college football season. In their second year under head coach Clifford Bell, Kirksville compiled an 8–0 record, shut out seven of eight opponents, and outscored all opponents by a total of 267 to 6. The 1908 season was the first perfect season in program history. Additional perfect seasons followed in 1920, 1932, 1933, 1934, and 1936.

== Schedule ==
Date	Opponent	Site	Result	Attendance	Source
October 3	at Central (MO)	Fayette, MO	W 20–6		
October 10	at William Jewell	Liberty, MO	W 5–0 or L 0–1 (forfeit)		
October 13	at Westminster (MO)	Fulton, MO	W 45–0		
October 17	at Monmouth (IL)	Monmouth, IL			
October 23	Central (MO)	Normal Athletic Field; Kirksville, MO	W 40–0		
October 30	Maryville Normal	Kirksville, MO	W 62–0		
November 6	Amity	Normal Athletic Field; Kirksville, MO	W 49–0		
November 17	Tarkio	Normal Athletic Field; Kirksville, MO	W 36–0		
November 26	at Cape Girardeau Normal	Cape Girardeau, MO	W 9–0		
