= 1908 Hillsdale Dales football team =

American college football season

1908 Hillsdale football
- Conference: Michigan Intercollegiate Athletic Association
- Record: 0–7 (2–2–1 MIAA)
- Head coach: Herbert C. Reed (1st season)

The 1908 Hillsdale Dales football team represented Hillsdale College during the 1908 college football season.

== Schedule ==
Date	Opponent	Site	Result	Source
October 3	Notre Dame*	Cartier Field; Notre Dame, IN	L 0–39	
	Olivet		L 0–34	
October 17	Albion	Winter-Lau Field; Albion, MI	L 0–6	
October 24	Western State Normal	Hillsdale, MI	W 6–5 or 0–0	
October 31	Battle Creek Training School*	Hillsdale, MI	W 34–0 or 35–0	
November 7	Adrian	Adrian, MI	W 12–10	
November 14	Hudson*		W 18–0	
November 21	Michigan State Normal	Ypsilanti, MI	W 20–10	
	Kalamazoo		T 0–0	
*Non-conference game

- The contest against Hudson on November 14 is not recognized in Hillsdale's athletic records, nor any other 3rd party compilation of the team's 1908 season.
