= Victor M. Place =

American football player, coach, and lawyer (1876–1923)

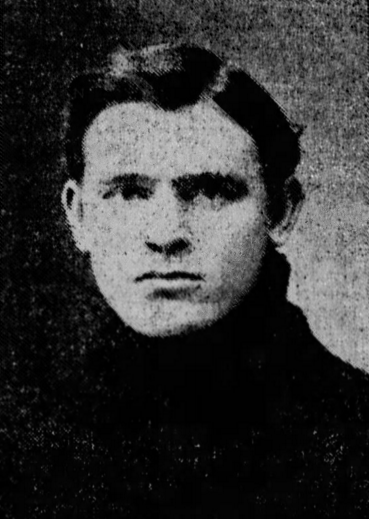
- Place as Dartmouth captain, 1902

Biographical details
- Born: November 26, 1876; New Salem, Massachusetts, U.S.
- Died: June 16, 1923 (aged 46); Brookings, Oregon, U.S.

Playing career
- 1900–1902: Dartmouth
- Position: Tackle

Coaching career (HC unless noted)
- 1903–1905: Ohio Wesleyan
- 1906–1907: Washington
- 1908: Notre Dame

Head coaching record
- Overall: 30–24–6

Victor Morton Place (November 26, 1876 – June 16, 1923) was an American college football player and coach, and lawyer. He played football at Dartmouth College from 1900 to 1902, serving as the team captain in 1902. He served as the head football coach at Ohio Wesleyan University from 1903 to 1905, at the University of Washington from 1906 to 1907, and at the University of Notre Dame in 1908, compiling a career record of 30–24–6. His single loss as Notre Dame's head coach was at an away game against the Michigan Wolverines, a significant football rival since 1887.

The following is a description of the 1909 Notre Dame team from Michael Steele's The Fighting Irish Football Encyclopedia:

"Victor Place [Notre Dame's coach in 1908] was replaced by Frank Longman, a former fullback for Yost from 1903 to 1905. He had coached at Arkansas and Wooster; at Wooster he had beaten Ohio State, the first time in 18 tries for the small school. In picking Longman, Notre Dame signalled [sic] the end of the domination of eastern personnel and methods."

Place died at Brookings, Oregon, in a logging accident in 1923.

== Early life and education ==
Place was born on November 26, 1876, in New Salem, Massachusetts. He earned an LLB from Harvard Law School in 1906.

== Head coaching record ==
Year	Team	Overall	Conference	Standing	Bowl/playoffs
Ohio Wesleyan (Ohio Athletic Conference) (1903–1905)
1903	Ohio Wesleyan	5–4	2–3		
1904	Ohio Wesleyan	5–5	2–2		
1905	Ohio Wesleyan	4–7	1–3		
Ohio Wesleyan:		14–16	5–8		
Washington (Independent) (1906–1907)
1906	Washington	4–1–4			
1907	Washington	4–4–2			
Washington:		8–5–6			
Notre Dame Fighting Irish (Independent) (1908)
1908	Notre Dame	8–1			
Notre Dame:		8–1			
Total:		30–24–6			
