= 1908 Miami Redskins football team =

American college football season

1908 Miami Redskins football
- Conference: Independent
- Record: 7–0
- Head coach: Amos Foster (2nd season)

1908 Midwestern college football independents records
| | Conf. | | | Overall |
| Team | W | L | T | W | | L | | T |
|---|---|---|---|---|---|---|---|---|
| Kirksville Normal | | – | | 8 | – | 0 | – | 0 |
| Miami (OH) | | – | | 7 | – | 0 | – | 0 |
| Iowa State Normal | | – | | 5 | – | 0 | – | 0 |
| Lincoln (MO) | | – | | 2 | – | 0 | – | 0 |
| DePaul | | – | | 7 | – | 0 | – | 1 |
| St. Mary's (OH) | | – | | 7 | – | 0 | – | 1 |
| Butler | | – | | 5 | – | 0 | – | 1 |
| Ohio Northern | | – | | 9 | – | 1 | – | 0 |
| Fairmount | | – | | 8 | – | 1 | – | 0 |
| Notre Dame | | – | | 8 | – | 1 | – | 0 |
| Michigan Agricultural | | – | | 6 | – | 0 | – | 2 |
| Lake Forest | | – | | 4 | – | 1 | – | 1 |
| Saint Louis | | – | | 6 | – | 2 | – | 2 |
| Kansas State | | – | | 6 | – | 2 | – | 0 |
| Michigan | | – | | 5 | – | 2 | – | 1 |
| Marquette | | – | | 4 | – | 2 | – | 1 |
| St. Viator | | – | | 5 | – | 3 | – | 0 |
| Central Michigan | | – | | 4 | – | 3 | – | 0 |
| Mount Union | | – | | 5 | – | 4 | – | 1 |
| Doane | | – | | 4 | – | 4 | – | 0 |
| South Dakota State | | – | | 3 | – | 3 | – | 1 |
| Buchtel | | – | | 3 | – | 4 | – | 0 |
| Western State Normal | | – | | 3 | – | 4 | – | 0 |
| Western Illinois | | – | | 2 | – | 3 | – | 1 |
| Carthage | | – | | 2 | – | 3 | – | 0 |
| Haskell | | – | | 3 | – | 5 | – | 1 |
| Wittenberg | | – | | 3 | – | 5 | – | 1 |
| Ohio | | – | | 3 | – | 5 | – | 0 |
| North Dakota Agricultural | | – | | 2 | – | 3 | – | 0 |
| Cincinnati | | – | | 1 | – | 4 | – | 1 |
| Wabash | | – | | 2 | – | 6 | – | 0 |
| Northern Illinois State | | – | | 1 | – | 5 | – | 1 |
| Michigan State Normal | | – | | 1 | – | 4 | – | 0 |
| Heidelberg | | – | | 1 | – | 6 | – | 0 |
| Franklin | | – | | 0 | – | 9 | – | 1 |
| Baldwin–Wallace | | – | | 0 | – | 2 | – | 0 |
| Chicago P&S | | – | | 0 | – | 4 | – | 0 |

The 1908 Miami Redskins football team was an American football team that represented Miami University during the 1908 college football season. In its second and final season under head coach Amos Foster, the team compiled a perfect 7–0, shut out six of seven opponents, and outscored all opponents by a combined total of 113 to 10. The team captains were George Booth and T. Rymer.

== Schedule ==
| Date | Opponent | Site | Result |
|---|---|---|---|
| October 3 | Wilmington (OH) | Miami Field; Oxford, OH | W 34–0 |
| October 10 | at Central University | Danville, KY | W 6–0 |
| October 17 | at Ohio | Athens, OH (rivalry) | W 5–0 |
| October 31 | at Oberlin | Oberlin, OH | W 11–10 |
| November 7 | Wabash | Miami Field; Oxford, OH | W 6–0 |
| November 21 | Ohio Wesleyan | Miami Field; Oxford, OH | W 24–0 |
| November 26 | at Kentucky University | Lexington KY | W 27–0 |
