= 1908 Western State Normal Hilltoppers football team =

American college football season

1908 Western State Normal Hilltoppers football
- Conference: Independent
- Record: 3–4
- Head coach: William H. Spaulding (2nd season)
- Captain: Tubby Meyers

1908 Midwestern college football independents records
	Conf.			Overall
Team	W	L	T	W		L		T
Kirksville Normal		–		8	–	0	–	0
Miami (OH)		–		7	–	0	–	0
Iowa State Normal		–		5	–	0	–	0
Lincoln (MO)		–		2	–	0	–	0
DePaul		–		7	–	0	–	1
St. Mary's (OH)		–		7	–	0	–	1
Butler		–		5	–	0	–	1
Ohio Northern		–		9	–	1	–	0
Fairmount		–		8	–	1	–	0
Notre Dame		–		8	–	1	–	0
Michigan Agricultural		–		6	–	0	–	2
Lake Forest		–		4	–	1	–	1
Saint Louis		–		6	–	2	–	2
Kansas State		–		6	–	2	–	0
Michigan		–		5	–	2	–	1
Marquette		–		4	–	2	–	1
St. Viator		–		5	–	3	–	0
Central Michigan		–		4	–	3	–	0
Mount Union		–		5	–	4	–	1
Doane		–		4	–	4	–	0
South Dakota State		–		3	–	3	–	1
Buchtel		–		3	–	4	–	0
Western State Normal		–		3	–	4	–	0
Western Illinois		–		2	–	3	–	1
Carthage		–		2	–	3	–	0
Haskell		–		3	–	5	–	1
Wittenberg		–		3	–	5	–	1
Ohio		–		3	–	5	–	0
North Dakota Agricultural		–		2	–	3	–	0
Cincinnati		–		1	–	4	–	1
Wabash		–		2	–	6	–	0
Northern Illinois State		–		1	–	5	–	1
Michigan State Normal		–		1	–	4	–	0
Heidelberg		–		1	–	6	–	0
Franklin		–		0	–	9	–	1
Baldwin–Wallace		–		0	–	2	–	0
Chicago P&S		–		0	–	4	–	0

The 1908 Western State Normal Hilltoppers football team represented Western State Normal School (later renamed Western Michigan University) as an independent during the 1908 college football season. In their second season under head coach William H. Spaulding, the Hilltoppers compiled a 3–4 record and were outscored by their opponents, 98 to 33. Halfback Tubby Meyers was the team captain for the third consecutive year.

== Schedule ==
Date	Time	Opponent	Site	Result	Source
October 10		at MacFadden Physical Culturalists	Athletic Park; Battle Creek, MI	W 20–0	
October 17		at Michigan Agricultural	College Field; East Lansing, MI	L 0–35	
October 24		at Hillsdale	Hillsdale, MI	L 5–6	
October 30		at Olivet	Olivet, MI	L 0–34	
November 7		at Albion	Albion, MI	L 0–24	
November 21	10:00 a.m.	Central Michigan	College campus (rivalry); Kalamazoo, MI	W 11–5	
November 26		Kalamazoo	Kalamazoo, MI	W 2–0	
