= 1908 Michigan State Normal Normalites football team =

American college football season

1908 Michigan State Normal Normalites football
- Conference: Independent
- Record: 1–4
- Head coach: Henry Schulte (3rd season)
- Captain: Curry Hicks

1908 Midwestern college football independents records
	Conf.			Overall
Team	W	L	T	W		L		T
Kirksville Normal		–		8	–	0	–	0
Miami (OH)		–		7	–	0	–	0
Iowa State Normal		–		5	–	0	–	0
Lincoln (MO)		–		2	–	0	–	0
DePaul		–		7	–	0	–	1
St. Mary's (OH)		–		7	–	0	–	1
Butler		–		5	–	0	–	1
Ohio Northern		–		9	–	1	–	0
Fairmount		–		8	–	1	–	0
Notre Dame		–		8	–	1	–	0
Michigan Agricultural		–		6	–	0	–	2
Lake Forest		–		4	–	1	–	1
Saint Louis		–		6	–	2	–	2
Kansas State		–		6	–	2	–	0
Michigan		–		5	–	2	–	1
Marquette		–		4	–	2	–	1
St. Viator		–		5	–	3	–	0
Central Michigan		–		4	–	3	–	0
Mount Union		–		5	–	4	–	1
Doane		–		4	–	4	–	0
South Dakota State		–		3	–	3	–	1
Buchtel		–		3	–	4	–	0
Western State Normal		–		3	–	4	–	0
Western Illinois		–		2	–	3	–	1
Carthage		–		2	–	3	–	0
Haskell		–		3	–	5	–	1
Wittenberg		–		3	–	5	–	1
Ohio		–		3	–	5	–	0
North Dakota Agricultural		–		2	–	3	–	0
Cincinnati		–		1	–	4	–	1
Wabash		–		2	–	6	–	0
Northern Illinois State		–		1	–	5	–	1
Michigan State Normal		–		1	–	4	–	0
Heidelberg		–		1	–	6	–	0
Franklin		–		0	–	9	–	1
Baldwin–Wallace		–		0	–	2	–	0
Chicago P&S		–		0	–	4	–	0

The 1908 Michigan State Normal Normalites football team represented Michigan State Normal College (later renamed Eastern Michigan University) as an independent during the 1908 college football season. In their third and final season under head coach Henry Schulte, the Normalites compiled a record of 1–4 and were outscored by their opponents by a combined total of 40 to 15. Curry Hicks, who served as the school's head football coach in 1910, was the team captain.

In three years as Michigan Normal's football coach, Schulte compiled a 9–6–1 record. He later served as the head football coach at Missouri (1914-1917) and Nebraska (1919-1920).

== Schedule ==
Date	Opponent	Site	Result	Source
October 10	Michigan School for the Deaf	Ypsilanti, MI	W 6–0	
October 23	Alma	Ypsilanti, MI	L 0–5	
October 31	at Adrian	Adrian, MI	L 0–4	
November 7	at Central Michigan	Mount Pleasant, MI (rivalry)	L 0–11	
November 21	Hillsdale	Ypsilanti, MI	L 10–20	
