= 1908 North Dakota Agricultural Aggies football team =

American college football season

1908 North Dakota Agricultural Aggies football
- Conference: Independent
- Record: 2–3
- Head coach: Paul Magoffin (1st season)
- Captain: Leo Nemzek

1908 Midwestern college football independents records
	Conf.			Overall
Team	W	L	T	W		L		T
Kirksville Normal		–		8	–	0	–	0
Miami (OH)		–		7	–	0	–	0
Iowa State Normal		–		5	–	0	–	0
Lincoln (MO)		–		2	–	0	–	0
DePaul		–		7	–	0	–	1
St. Mary's (OH)		–		7	–	0	–	1
Butler		–		5	–	0	–	1
Ohio Northern		–		9	–	1	–	0
Fairmount		–		8	–	1	–	0
Notre Dame		–		8	–	1	–	0
Michigan Agricultural		–		6	–	0	–	2
Lake Forest		–		4	–	1	–	1
Saint Louis		–		6	–	2	–	2
Kansas State		–		6	–	2	–	0
Michigan		–		5	–	2	–	1
Marquette		–		4	–	2	–	1
St. Viator		–		5	–	3	–	0
Central Michigan		–		4	–	3	–	0
Mount Union		–		5	–	4	–	1
Doane		–		4	–	4	–	0
South Dakota State		–		3	–	3	–	1
Buchtel		–		3	–	4	–	0
Western State Normal		–		3	–	4	–	0
Western Illinois		–		2	–	3	–	1
Carthage		–		2	–	3	–	0
Haskell		–		3	–	5	–	1
Wittenberg		–		3	–	5	–	1
Ohio		–		3	–	5	–	0
North Dakota Agricultural		–		2	–	3	–	0
Cincinnati		–		1	–	4	–	1
Wabash		–		2	–	6	–	0
Northern Illinois State		–		1	–	5	–	1
Michigan State Normal		–		1	–	4	–	0
Heidelberg		–		1	–	6	–	0
Franklin		–		0	–	9	–	1
Baldwin–Wallace		–		0	–	2	–	0
Chicago P&S		–		0	–	4	–	0

The 1908 North Dakota Agricultural Aggies football team was an American football team that represented North Dakota Agricultural College (now known as North Dakota State University) as an independent during the 1908 college football season. In their only year under head coach Paul Magoffin, the team compiled a 2–3 record.

== Schedule ==
Date	Opponent	Site	Result	Source
October 10	St. Cloud Normal	Fargo, ND	W 28–0	
October 17	at St. Thomas (MN)	Saint Paul, MN	L 0–11	
October 23	South Dakota State	Fargo, ND (rivalry)	L 5–11	
October 31	St. Thomas (MN)	Fargo, ND	W 15–6	
November 13	Fargo	Fargo, ND	L 6–23	
