= 1908 Haskell Indians football team =

American college football season

1908 Haskell Indians football
- Conference: Independent
- Record: 3–5–1
- Head coach: John R. Bender (1st season)

1908 Midwestern college football independents records
	Conf.			Overall
Team	W	L	T	W		L		T
Kirksville Normal		–		8	–	0	–	0
Miami (OH)		–		7	–	0	–	0
Iowa State Normal		–		5	–	0	–	0
Lincoln (MO)		–		2	–	0	–	0
DePaul		–		7	–	0	–	1
St. Mary's (OH)		–		7	–	0	–	1
Butler		–		5	–	0	–	1
Ohio Northern		–		9	–	1	–	0
Fairmount		–		8	–	1	–	0
Notre Dame		–		8	–	1	–	0
Michigan Agricultural		–		6	–	0	–	2
Lake Forest		–		4	–	1	–	1
Saint Louis		–		6	–	2	–	2
Kansas State		–		6	–	2	–	0
Michigan		–		5	–	2	–	1
Marquette		–		4	–	2	–	1
St. Viator		–		5	–	3	–	0
Central Michigan		–		4	–	3	–	0
Mount Union		–		5	–	4	–	1
Doane		–		4	–	4	–	0
South Dakota State		–		3	–	3	–	1
Buchtel		–		3	–	4	–	0
Western State Normal		–		3	–	4	–	0
Western Illinois		–		2	–	3	–	1
Carthage		–		2	–	3	–	0
Haskell		–		3	–	5	–	1
Wittenberg		–		3	–	5	–	1
Ohio		–		3	–	5	–	0
North Dakota Agricultural		–		2	–	3	–	0
Cincinnati		–		1	–	4	–	1
Wabash		–		2	–	6	–	0
Northern Illinois State		–		1	–	5	–	1
Michigan State Normal		–		1	–	4	–	0
Heidelberg		–		1	–	6	–	0
Franklin		–		0	–	9	–	1
Baldwin–Wallace		–		0	–	2	–	0
Chicago P&S		–		0	–	4	–	0

The 1908 Haskell Indians football team was a notable American football team that represented the Haskell Indian Institute (now known as Haskell Indian Nations University) as an independent during the 1908 college football season. In its first season under head coach John R. Bender, Haskell compiled a 3–5–1 record and was outscored by a total of 79 to 65.

The teams played games against five teams that now play in Power Five conferences: a victory over Texas A&M and losses to Arkansas, Nebraska, LSU, and Alabama.

== Schedule ==
Date	Time	Opponent	Site	Result	Attendance	Source
October 3		at Arkansas	The Hill; Fayetteville, AR	L 0–6		
October 6	3:00 p.m.	at Drury	Drury Athletic Field; Springfield, MO	W 4–0		
October 17	3:30 p.m.	at Washburn	Topeka, KS	L 4–11		
October 24		at Nebraska	Antelope Field; Lincoln, NE	L 0–10		
October 31		at St. Mary's (KS)	St. Marys, KS	W 16–0		
November 13		at Texas A&M	College Station, TX	W 23–0		
November 16	3:30 p.m.	vs. LSU	Pelican Park; New Orleans, LA	L 0–33	3,000	
November 20		at Alabama	The Quad; Tuscaloosa, AL	L 8–9		
November 26		at Creighton	Vinton Street Park; Omaha, NE	T 10–10		
