= 1908 Lincoln Tigers football team =

American college football season

1908 Lincoln Tigers football
- Conference: Independent
- Record: 2–0
- Head coach: Romeo West (4th season)

1908 Midwestern college football independents records
	Conf.			Overall
Team	W	L	T	W		L		T
Kirksville Normal		–		8	–	0	–	0
Miami (OH)		–		7	–	0	–	0
Iowa State Normal		–		5	–	0	–	0
Lincoln (MO)		–		2	–	0	–	0
DePaul		–		7	–	0	–	1
St. Mary's (OH)		–		7	–	0	–	1
Butler		–		5	–	0	–	1
Ohio Northern		–		9	–	1	–	0
Fairmount		–		8	–	1	–	0
Notre Dame		–		8	–	1	–	0
Michigan Agricultural		–		6	–	0	–	2
Lake Forest		–		4	–	1	–	1
Saint Louis		–		6	–	2	–	2
Kansas State		–		6	–	2	–	0
Michigan		–		5	–	2	–	1
Marquette		–		4	–	2	–	1
St. Viator		–		5	–	3	–	0
Central Michigan		–		4	–	3	–	0
Mount Union		–		5	–	4	–	1
Doane		–		4	–	4	–	0
South Dakota State		–		3	–	3	–	1
Buchtel		–		3	–	4	–	0
Western State Normal		–		3	–	4	–	0
Western Illinois		–		2	–	3	–	1
Carthage		–		2	–	3	–	0
Haskell		–		3	–	5	–	1
Wittenberg		–		3	–	5	–	1
Ohio		–		3	–	5	–	0
North Dakota Agricultural		–		2	–	3	–	0
Cincinnati		–		1	–	4	–	1
Wabash		–		2	–	6	–	0
Northern Illinois State		–		1	–	5	–	1
Michigan State Normal		–		1	–	4	–	0
Heidelberg		–		1	–	6	–	0
Franklin		–		0	–	9	–	1
Baldwin–Wallace		–		0	–	2	–	0
Chicago P&S		–		0	–	4	–	0

The 1908 Lincoln Tigers football team represented Lincoln Institute—now known as Lincoln University—in Jefferson City, Missouri as an independent during the 1908 college football season. The Tigers were especially dominant this season, scoring 71 points and allowing none.

== Schedule ==
Date	Opponent	Site	Result	Source
October 7 or 17	Boonville team		W 61–0	
November 7	Lincoln High School	State capital grounds; Jefferson City, MO	W 10–0	
