= 1908 Buchtel football team =

American college football season

1908 Buchtel football
- Conference: Independent
- Record: 3–4
- Head coach: Dwight Bradley (1st season)
- Captain: Fred Fuchs
- Home stadium: Lakeside park, Nollan's field

1908 Midwestern college football independents records
	Conf.			Overall
Team	W	L	T	W		L		T
Kirksville Normal		–		8	–	0	–	0
Miami (OH)		–		7	–	0	–	0
Iowa State Normal		–		5	–	0	–	0
Lincoln (MO)		–		2	–	0	–	0
DePaul		–		7	–	0	–	1
St. Mary's (OH)		–		7	–	0	–	1
Butler		–		5	–	0	–	1
Ohio Northern		–		9	–	1	–	0
Fairmount		–		8	–	1	–	0
Notre Dame		–		8	–	1	–	0
Michigan Agricultural		–		6	–	0	–	2
Lake Forest		–		4	–	1	–	1
Saint Louis		–		6	–	2	–	2
Kansas State		–		6	–	2	–	0
Michigan		–		5	–	2	–	1
Marquette		–		4	–	2	–	1
St. Viator		–		5	–	3	–	0
Central Michigan		–		4	–	3	–	0
Mount Union		–		5	–	4	–	1
Doane		–		4	–	4	–	0
South Dakota State		–		3	–	3	–	1
Buchtel		–		3	–	4	–	0
Western State Normal		–		3	–	4	–	0
Western Illinois		–		2	–	3	–	1
Carthage		–		2	–	3	–	0
Haskell		–		3	–	5	–	1
Wittenberg		–		3	–	5	–	1
Ohio		–		3	–	5	–	0
North Dakota Agricultural		–		2	–	3	–	0
Cincinnati		–		1	–	4	–	1
Wabash		–		2	–	6	–	0
Northern Illinois State		–		1	–	5	–	1
Michigan State Normal		–		1	–	4	–	0
Heidelberg		–		1	–	6	–	0
Franklin		–		0	–	9	–	1
Baldwin–Wallace		–		0	–	2	–	0
Chicago P&S		–		0	–	4	–	0

The 1908 Buchtel football team represented Buchtel College—now known as the University of Akron—as an independent during the 1908 college football season. Led by Dwight Bradley in his first and only season as head coach, Butchel compiled a record of 3–4. The team played home games at Lakeside park and Nollan's field in Akron, Ohio.

== Schedule ==
Date	Opponent	Site	Result	Attendance	Source
September 26	at Wooster	University field; Wooster, OH	L 0–16		
October 3	at Pittsburgh Lyceum	the Bluff; Pittsburgh, PA	L 0–36	2,000	
October 17	at Mount Union	Alliance, OH	L 5–9		
October 24	at Hiram	Hiram field; Hiram, OH	L 0–4		
October 31	Bethany (WV)	Lakeside park; Akron, OH	W 11–10 (or L 5–10)		
November 4	Hiram	Nollan's field; Akron, OH	W 10–0		
November 20	Findlay	Nollan's field; Akron, OH	W 6–5	300	
