= 1908 Saint Louis Blue and White football team =

American college football season

1908 Saint Louis Blue and White football
- Conference: Independent
- Record: 6–2–2
- Head coach: Eddie Cochems (3rd season)
- Home stadium: Handlan's Park, Sportsman's Park

1908 Midwestern college football independents records
	Conf.			Overall
Team	W	L	T	W		L		T
Kirksville Normal		–		8	–	0	–	0
Miami (OH)		–		7	–	0	–	0
Iowa State Normal		–		5	–	0	–	0
Lincoln (MO)		–		2	–	0	–	0
DePaul		–		7	–	0	–	1
St. Mary's (OH)		–		7	–	0	–	1
Butler		–		5	–	0	–	1
Ohio Northern		–		9	–	1	–	0
Fairmount		–		8	–	1	–	0
Notre Dame		–		8	–	1	–	0
Michigan Agricultural		–		6	–	0	–	2
Lake Forest		–		4	–	1	–	1
Saint Louis		–		6	–	2	–	2
Kansas State		–		6	–	2	–	0
Michigan		–		5	–	2	–	1
Marquette		–		4	–	2	–	1
St. Viator		–		5	–	3	–	0
Central Michigan		–		4	–	3	–	0
Mount Union		–		5	–	4	–	1
Doane		–		4	–	4	–	0
South Dakota State		–		3	–	3	–	1
Buchtel		–		3	–	4	–	0
Western State Normal		–		3	–	4	–	0
Western Illinois		–		2	–	3	–	1
Carthage		–		2	–	3	–	0
Haskell		–		3	–	5	–	1
Wittenberg		–		3	–	5	–	1
Ohio		–		3	–	5	–	0
North Dakota Agricultural		–		2	–	3	–	0
Cincinnati		–		1	–	4	–	1
Wabash		–		2	–	6	–	0
Northern Illinois State		–		1	–	5	–	1
Michigan State Normal		–		1	–	4	–	0
Heidelberg		–		1	–	6	–	0
Franklin		–		0	–	9	–	1
Baldwin–Wallace		–		0	–	2	–	0
Chicago P&S		–		0	–	4	–	0

The 1908 Saint Louis Blue and White football team was an American football team that represented Saint Louis University as an independent during the 1908 college football season. In its third and final season under head coach Eddie Cochems, the team compiled a 6–2–2 record and outscored opponents by a total of 119 to 36. The team played its home games at Sportsman's Park in St. Louis.

== Schedule ==
Date	Time	Opponent	Site	Result	Attendance	Source
September 26		at Shurtleff	Western Military Academy grounds; Alton, MO	W 17–0		
October 3	3:00 p.m.	Missouri Mines	Handlan's Park; St. Louis, MO	W 17–0	1,500	
October 10		Cape Girardeau Normal	Sportsman's Park; St. Louis, MO	W 45–0		
October 17		Arkansas	Sportsman's Park; St. Louis, MO	W 24–0		
October 24		at Wabash	Crawfordsville, IN	W 4–0		
October 31	3:00 p.m.	Pittsburgh	Sportsman's Park; St. Louis, MO	L 0–13	12,000	
November 7		Sewanee	Sportsman's Park; St. Louis, MO	T 6–6		
November 14		at Creighton	Omaha, NE	W 6–0		
November 19		at Carleton (MO)	Farmington, MO	T 0–0		
November 26	2:00 p.m.	Carlisle	Sportsman's Park; St. Louis, MO	L 0–17		
