= 1908 Kansas State Aggies football team =

American college football season

1908 Kansas State Aggies football
- Conference: Independent
- Record: 6–2
- Head coach: Mike Ahearn (4th season)

1908 Midwestern college football independents records
	Conf.			Overall
Team	W	L	T	W		L		T
Kirksville Normal		–		8	–	0	–	0
Miami (OH)		–		7	–	0	–	0
Iowa State Normal		–		5	–	0	–	0
Lincoln (MO)		–		2	–	0	–	0
DePaul		–		7	–	0	–	1
St. Mary's (OH)		–		7	–	0	–	1
Butler		–		5	–	0	–	1
Ohio Northern		–		9	–	1	–	0
Fairmount		–		8	–	1	–	0
Notre Dame		–		8	–	1	–	0
Michigan Agricultural		–		6	–	0	–	2
Lake Forest		–		4	–	1	–	1
Saint Louis		–		6	–	2	–	2
Kansas State		–		6	–	2	–	0
Michigan		–		5	–	2	–	1
Marquette		–		4	–	2	–	1
St. Viator		–		5	–	3	–	0
Central Michigan		–		4	–	3	–	0
Mount Union		–		5	–	4	–	1
Doane		–		4	–	4	–	0
South Dakota State		–		3	–	3	–	1
Buchtel		–		3	–	4	–	0
Western State Normal		–		3	–	4	–	0
Western Illinois		–		2	–	3	–	1
Carthage		–		2	–	3	–	0
Haskell		–		3	–	5	–	1
Wittenberg		–		3	–	5	–	1
Ohio		–		3	–	5	–	0
North Dakota Agricultural		–		2	–	3	–	0
Cincinnati		–		1	–	4	–	1
Wabash		–		2	–	6	–	0
Northern Illinois State		–		1	–	5	–	1
Michigan State Normal		–		1	–	4	–	0
Heidelberg		–		1	–	6	–	0
Franklin		–		0	–	9	–	1
Baldwin–Wallace		–		0	–	2	–	0
Chicago P&S		–		0	–	4	–	0

The 1908 Kansas State Aggies football team represented Kansas State Agricultural College (now Kansas State University) in the 1908 college football season. In their fourth year under head coach Mike Ahearn, the Aggies compiled a 6–2 record, and outscored their opponents by a combined total of 182 to 74.

== Schedule ==
Date	Opponent	Site	Result	Source
October 3	Kansas Wesleyan	Manhattan, KS	W 28–5	
October 10	at Kansas	McCook Field; Lawrence, KS (rivalry)	L 6–12	
October 23	Oklahoma	Manhattan, KS	L 4–33	
October 28	Southwestern (KS)	Manhattan, KS	W 17-0	
November 7	at Creighton	Omaha, NE	W 31–0	
November 14	Oklahoma A&M	Manhattan, KS	W 40–10	
November 21	at Washburn	Topeka, KS	W 23–4	
November 26	Colorado Agricultural	Manhattan, KS	W 33–10	
