= 1908 Marquette Blue and Gold football team =

American college football season

1908 Marquette Blue and Gold football
- Conference: Independent
- Record: 4–2–1
- Head coach: William Juneau (1st season)

1908 Midwestern college football independents records
	Conf.			Overall
Team	W	L	T	W		L		T
Kirksville Normal		–		8	–	0	–	0
Miami (OH)		–		7	–	0	–	0
Iowa State Normal		–		5	–	0	–	0
Lincoln (MO)		–		2	–	0	–	0
DePaul		–		7	–	0	–	1
St. Mary's (OH)		–		7	–	0	–	1
Butler		–		5	–	0	–	1
Ohio Northern		–		9	–	1	–	0
Fairmount		–		8	–	1	–	0
Notre Dame		–		8	–	1	–	0
Michigan Agricultural		–		6	–	0	–	2
Lake Forest		–		4	–	1	–	1
Saint Louis		–		6	–	2	–	2
Kansas State		–		6	–	2	–	0
Michigan		–		5	–	2	–	1
Marquette		–		4	–	2	–	1
St. Viator		–		5	–	3	–	0
Central Michigan		–		4	–	3	–	0
Mount Union		–		5	–	4	–	1
Doane		–		4	–	4	–	0
South Dakota State		–		3	–	3	–	1
Buchtel		–		3	–	4	–	0
Western State Normal		–		3	–	4	–	0
Western Illinois		–		2	–	3	–	1
Carthage		–		2	–	3	–	0
Haskell		–		3	–	5	–	1
Wittenberg		–		3	–	5	–	1
Ohio		–		3	–	5	–	0
North Dakota Agricultural		–		2	–	3	–	0
Cincinnati		–		1	–	4	–	1
Wabash		–		2	–	6	–	0
Northern Illinois State		–		1	–	5	–	1
Michigan State Normal		–		1	–	4	–	0
Heidelberg		–		1	–	6	–	0
Franklin		–		0	–	9	–	1
Baldwin–Wallace		–		0	–	2	–	0
Chicago P&S		–		0	–	4	–	0

The 1908 Marquette Blue and Gold football team represented Marquette University as an independent during the 1908 college football season.

== Schedule ==
Date	Opponent	Site	Result
October 3	Oshkosh State	Milwaukee, WI	W 45–0
October 10	Illinois	Illinois Field; Champaign, IL	T 6–6
October 17	St. Viator	Milwaukee, WI	W 63–0
October 31	Wisconsin	Randall Field; Madison, WI	L 6–9
November 7	Lawrence	Appleton, WI	W 17–0
November 14	St. Thomas (MN)	Milwaukee, WI	W 45–0
November 26	Notre Dame	Milwaukee, WI	L 0–6
