= 1908 Franklin Baptists football team =

American college football season

1908 Franklin Baptists football
- Conference: Independent
- Record: 0–9–1
- Head coach: Brown
- Captain: Bryan (right halfback)

1908 Midwestern college football independents records
	Conf.			Overall
Team	W	L	T	W		L		T
Kirksville Normal		–		8	–	0	–	0
Miami (OH)		–		7	–	0	–	0
Iowa State Normal		–		5	–	0	–	0
Lincoln (MO)		–		2	–	0	–	0
DePaul		–		7	–	0	–	1
St. Mary's (OH)		–		7	–	0	–	1
Butler		–		5	–	0	–	1
Ohio Northern		–		9	–	1	–	0
Fairmount		–		8	–	1	–	0
Notre Dame		–		8	–	1	–	0
Michigan Agricultural		–		6	–	0	–	2
Lake Forest		–		4	–	1	–	1
Saint Louis		–		6	–	2	–	2
Kansas State		–		6	–	2	–	0
Michigan		–		5	–	2	–	1
Marquette		–		4	–	2	–	1
St. Viator		–		5	–	3	–	0
Central Michigan		–		4	–	3	–	0
Mount Union		–		5	–	4	–	1
Doane		–		4	–	4	–	0
South Dakota State		–		3	–	3	–	1
Buchtel		–		3	–	4	–	0
Western State Normal		–		3	–	4	–	0
Western Illinois		–		2	–	3	–	1
Carthage		–		2	–	3	–	0
Haskell		–		3	–	5	–	1
Wittenberg		–		3	–	5	–	1
Ohio		–		3	–	5	–	0
North Dakota Agricultural		–		2	–	3	–	0
Cincinnati		–		1	–	4	–	1
Wabash		–		2	–	6	–	0
Northern Illinois State		–		1	–	5	–	1
Michigan State Normal		–		1	–	4	–	0
Heidelberg		–		1	–	6	–	0
Franklin		–		0	–	9	–	1
Baldwin–Wallace		–		0	–	2	–	0
Chicago P&S		–		0	–	4	–	0

The 1908 Franklin Baptists football team represented the Franklin College of Indiana during the 1908 college football season. The Baptists lost a school record nine games (the record was tied in 1992 with another 0–9–1 season), and scored a combined 19 points, compared to their opponent's combined total of 263.

== Schedule ==
Date	Time	Opponent	Site	Result	Source
September 26	3:00 p.m.	DePauw	Greencastle, IN	L 0–20	
October 2		Wabash	Ingalls Field; Crawfordsville, IN	L 0–62	
October 10		Notre Dame	Cartier Field; Notre Dame, IN	L 0–64	
October 17		Earlham	Reid Field; Richmond, IN	L 6–16	
October 24		Butler	Franklin, IN	L 0–8	
October 24		Indiana		Cancelled	
October 29		Hanover	Franklin, IN	T 5–5	
		Muskingum		L 0–36	
		Dayton		L 2–12	
November 11		Hanover	Madison, IN	L 6–17	
November 14		Butler	Irwin Field; Indianapolis, IN	L 0–23	
