= 1908 Wabash Little Giants football team =

American college football season

1908 Wabash Little Giants football
- Conference: Independent
- Record: 2–6
- Head coach: Ralph Jones (1st season)
- Home stadium: Ingalls Field

1908 Midwestern college football independents records
	Conf.			Overall
Team	W	L	T	W		L		T
Kirksville Normal		–		8	–	0	–	0
Miami (OH)		–		7	–	0	–	0
Iowa State Normal		–		5	–	0	–	0
Lincoln (MO)		–		2	–	0	–	0
DePaul		–		7	–	0	–	1
St. Mary's (OH)		–		7	–	0	–	1
Butler		–		5	–	0	–	1
Ohio Northern		–		9	–	1	–	0
Fairmount		–		8	–	1	–	0
Notre Dame		–		8	–	1	–	0
Michigan Agricultural		–		6	–	0	–	2
Lake Forest		–		4	–	1	–	1
Saint Louis		–		6	–	2	–	2
Kansas State		–		6	–	2	–	0
Michigan		–		5	–	2	–	1
Marquette		–		4	–	2	–	1
St. Viator		–		5	–	3	–	0
Central Michigan		–		4	–	3	–	0
Mount Union		–		5	–	4	–	1
Doane		–		4	–	4	–	0
South Dakota State		–		3	–	3	–	1
Buchtel		–		3	–	4	–	0
Western State Normal		–		3	–	4	–	0
Western Illinois		–		2	–	3	–	1
Carthage		–		2	–	3	–	0
Haskell		–		3	–	5	–	1
Wittenberg		–		3	–	5	–	1
Ohio		–		3	–	5	–	0
North Dakota Agricultural		–		2	–	3	–	0
Cincinnati		–		1	–	4	–	1
Wabash		–		2	–	6	–	0
Northern Illinois State		–		1	–	5	–	1
Michigan State Normal		–		1	–	4	–	0
Heidelberg		–		1	–	6	–	0
Franklin		–		0	–	9	–	1
Baldwin–Wallace		–		0	–	2	–	0
Chicago P&S		–		0	–	4	–	0

The 1908 Wabash Little Giants football team represented Wabash College as an independent during the 1908 college football season. In Ralph Jones's first season as head coach, the Little Giants compiled a 2–6 record, but still managed to outscore their opponents 95 to 65, thanks to a 62–0 blowout of Franklin in the season opener, and a plethora of close losses against Rose Polytechnic, St. Louis, Michigan Agricultural, Miami (OH), and Notre Dame, all of which were one score games.

Wabash's most notable and impressive contest was against Notre Dame, when the Little Giant's held the 8–1 Fighting Irish to eight points and scored four of their own, the best showing put up against the team besides Michigan. The Little Giant's also held an undefeated Michigan Agricultural and Miami of Ohio to six points each.

== Schedule ==
Date	Opponent	Site	Result	Attendance	Source
October 2	Franklin (IN)	Ingalls Field; Crawfordsville, IN	W 62–0		
October 17	Rose Polytechnic	Ingalls Field; Crawfordsville, IN	L 11–14		
October 24	St. Louis	Saint Louis, MO	L 0–4		
October 31	Michigan Agricultural	College Field; East Lansing, MI	L 0–6		
November 7	Miami (OH)	Miami Field; Oxford, OH	L 0–6		
November 13	Notre Dame	Ingalls Field; Crawfordsville, IN	L 4–8		
November 20	DePauw	Ingalls Field; Crawfordsville, IN	W 12–0	500+	
November 26	Nebraska	Antelope Field; Lincoln, NE	L 6–27		
