= 1908 Notre Dame Fighting Irish football team =

American college football season

1908 Notre Dame Fighting Irish football
- Conference: Independent
- Record: 8–1
- Head coach: Victor M. Place (1st season)
- Captain: Harry Miller
- Home stadium: Cartier Field

1908 Midwestern college football independents records
	Conf.			Overall
Team	W	L	T	W		L		T
Kirksville Normal		–		8	–	0	–	0
Miami (OH)		–		7	–	0	–	0
Iowa State Normal		–		5	–	0	–	0
Lincoln (MO)		–		2	–	0	–	0
DePaul		–		7	–	0	–	1
St. Mary's (OH)		–		7	–	0	–	1
Butler		–		5	–	0	–	1
Ohio Northern		–		9	–	1	–	0
Fairmount		–		8	–	1	–	0
Notre Dame		–		8	–	1	–	0
Michigan Agricultural		–		6	–	0	–	2
Lake Forest		–		4	–	1	–	1
Saint Louis		–		6	–	2	–	2
Kansas State		–		6	–	2	–	0
Michigan		–		5	–	2	–	1
Marquette		–		4	–	2	–	1
St. Viator		–		5	–	3	–	0
Central Michigan		–		4	–	3	–	0
Mount Union		–		5	–	4	–	1
Doane		–		4	–	4	–	0
South Dakota State		–		3	–	3	–	1
Buchtel		–		3	–	4	–	0
Western State Normal		–		3	–	4	–	0
Western Illinois		–		2	–	3	–	1
Carthage		–		2	–	3	–	0
Haskell		–		3	–	5	–	1
Wittenberg		–		3	–	5	–	1
Ohio		–		3	–	5	–	0
North Dakota Agricultural		–		2	–	3	–	0
Cincinnati		–		1	–	4	–	1
Wabash		–		2	–	6	–	0
Northern Illinois State		–		1	–	5	–	1
Michigan State Normal		–		1	–	4	–	0
Heidelberg		–		1	–	6	–	0
Franklin		–		0	–	9	–	1
Baldwin–Wallace		–		0	–	2	–	0
Chicago P&S		–		0	–	4	–	0

The 1908 Notre Dame Fighting Irish football team was an American football team that represented the University of Notre Dame as an independent during the 1908 college football season. In its first and only year under head coach Victor M. Place, the team compiled an 8–1 record and outscored opponents by a total of 326 to 20. The team did not allow any opponent to cross its goal line during the season, all points against them having been scored on field goals (then valued at four points).

Three Notre Dame players were selected by Walter Eckersall as first-team players on his 1908 All-Western college football team: Robert E. Vaughan at fullback; Ralph Dimmick at tackle; and Sam Dolan at guard.

The team played its home games at Cartier Field in Notre Dame, Indiana.

== Schedule ==
Date	Opponent	Site	Result	Attendance	Source
October 3	Hillsdale	Cartier Field; Notre Dame, IN	W 39–0		
October 10	Franklin (IN)	Cartier Field; Notre Dame, IN	W 64–0		
October 17	at Michigan	Ferry Field; Ann Arbor, MI (rivalry)	L 6–12		
October 24	Chicago Physicians and Surgeons	Cartier Field; Notre Dame, IN	W 88–0		
October 29	Ohio Northern	Cartier Field; Notre Dame, IN	W 58–4		
November 7	vs. Indiana	Washington Park; Indianapolis, IN	W 11–0		
November 13	at Wabash	Crawfordsville, IN	W 8–4		
November 18	St. Viator	Cartier Field; Notre Dame, IN	W 46–0		
November 26	at Marquette	Milwaukee, WI	W 6–0	7,500	

== Personnel ==
=== Players ===
- Joe Collins, end
- Ralph Dimmick, tackle
- Sam Dolan, tackle and guard
- John Duffy, guard
- Pete Dwyer, halfback
- Howard Edwards, tackle, fullback, and guard
- Don Hamilton, quarterback
- Luke Kelly, tackle
- Edward Lynch, guard
- James Maloney, end
- Lee Mathews, end
- Paul McDonald, halfback
- Albert Mertes, center
- Harry Miller, captain and halfback
- George Philbrook, guard
- Ruel, halfback
- Thomas Sullivan, center
- Robert E. Vaughan, fullback
- Fay Wood, end

=== Coaching staff ===
- Head coach: Victor M. Place (former Dartmouth player)
- Assistant coach: Joseph T. Lantry (former Ohio State player)
- Manager: Harry Curtis
- Assistant manager: Fay Wood
