= 1908 Ohio Northern football team =

American college football season

1908 Ohio Northern football
- Conference: Independent
- Record: 9–1
- Head coach: Snuff MacKowan (1st season)

1908 Midwestern college football independents records
	Conf.			Overall
Team	W	L	T	W		L		T
Kirksville Normal		–		8	–	0	–	0
Miami (OH)		–		7	–	0	–	0
Iowa State Normal		–		5	–	0	–	0
Lincoln (MO)		–		2	–	0	–	0
DePaul		–		7	–	0	–	1
St. Mary's (OH)		–		7	–	0	–	1
Butler		–		5	–	0	–	1
Ohio Northern		–		9	–	1	–	0
Fairmount		–		8	–	1	–	0
Notre Dame		–		8	–	1	–	0
Michigan Agricultural		–		6	–	0	–	2
Lake Forest		–		4	–	1	–	1
Saint Louis		–		6	–	2	–	2
Kansas State		–		6	–	2	–	0
Michigan		–		5	–	2	–	1
Marquette		–		4	–	2	–	1
St. Viator		–		5	–	3	–	0
Central Michigan		–		4	–	3	–	0
Mount Union		–		5	–	4	–	1
Doane		–		4	–	4	–	0
South Dakota State		–		3	–	3	–	1
Buchtel		–		3	–	4	–	0
Western State Normal		–		3	–	4	–	0
Western Illinois		–		2	–	3	–	1
Carthage		–		2	–	3	–	0
Haskell		–		3	–	5	–	1
Wittenberg		–		3	–	5	–	1
Ohio		–		3	–	5	–	0
North Dakota Agricultural		–		2	–	3	–	0
Cincinnati		–		1	–	4	–	1
Wabash		–		2	–	6	–	0
Northern Illinois State		–		1	–	5	–	1
Michigan State Normal		–		1	–	4	–	0
Heidelberg		–		1	–	6	–	0
Franklin		–		0	–	9	–	1
Baldwin–Wallace		–		0	–	2	–	0
Chicago P&S		–		0	–	4	–	0

The 1908 Ohio Northern football team represented Ohio Northern University during the 1908 college football season. Ohio Northern set a school record in wins with their 9–1 record, which would not be broken until the 1999 team's 11–2 record. They also outscored their opponents by a total of 211 to 83, the majority of those 83 points coming in Ohio Northern's only loss, a 4–58 thumping by Notre Dame.

== Schedule ==
Date	Opponent	Site	Result
September 26	Lima College Alumni	Ada, OH	W 39–0
	Ohio	Ada, OH	W 10–0
	Findlay	Ada, OH	W 12–6
	Antioch	Ada, OH	W 32–8
October 17	Wittenberg	Ada, OH	W 19–0
	Massillon High School	Ada, OH	W 16–5
October 29	Notre Dame	Cartier Field; Notre Dame, IN	L 4–58
	Otterbein	Ada, OH	W 15–0
October 31	Heidelberg	Ada, OH	W 41–0
November 26	Mount Union	Alliance, OH	W 23–6
