= 1908 Cincinnati football team =

American college football season

1908 Cincinnati football
- Conference: Independent
- Record: 1–4–1
- Head coach: Ralph Inott (1st season)
- Captain: Robert Marx
- Home stadium: Burnet Woods, League Park

1908 Midwestern college football independents records
	Conf.			Overall
Team	W	L	T	W		L		T
Kirksville Normal		–		8	–	0	–	0
Miami (OH)		–		7	–	0	–	0
Iowa State Normal		–		5	–	0	–	0
Lincoln (MO)		–		2	–	0	–	0
DePaul		–		7	–	0	–	1
St. Mary's (OH)		–		7	–	0	–	1
Butler		–		5	–	0	–	1
Ohio Northern		–		9	–	1	–	0
Fairmount		–		8	–	1	–	0
Notre Dame		–		8	–	1	–	0
Michigan Agricultural		–		6	–	0	–	2
Lake Forest		–		4	–	1	–	1
Saint Louis		–		6	–	2	–	2
Kansas State		–		6	–	2	–	0
Michigan		–		5	–	2	–	1
Marquette		–		4	–	2	–	1
St. Viator		–		5	–	3	–	0
Central Michigan		–		4	–	3	–	0
Mount Union		–		5	–	4	–	1
Doane		–		4	–	4	–	0
South Dakota State		–		3	–	3	–	1
Buchtel		–		3	–	4	–	0
Western State Normal		–		3	–	4	–	0
Western Illinois		–		2	–	3	–	1
Carthage		–		2	–	3	–	0
Haskell		–		3	–	5	–	1
Wittenberg		–		3	–	5	–	1
Ohio		–		3	–	5	–	0
North Dakota Agricultural		–		2	–	3	–	0
Cincinnati		–		1	–	4	–	1
Wabash		–		2	–	6	–	0
Northern Illinois State		–		1	–	5	–	1
Michigan State Normal		–		1	–	4	–	0
Heidelberg		–		1	–	6	–	0
Franklin		–		0	–	9	–	1
Baldwin–Wallace		–		0	–	2	–	0
Chicago P&S		–		0	–	4	–	0

The 1908 Cincinnati football team was an American football team that represented the University of Cincinnati as an independent during the 1908 college football season. Led by Ralph Inott in his first and only season as head coach, Cincinnati compiled a record of 1–4–1. Robert Marx was the team captain. The team played home games at Burnet Woods and League Park in Cincinnati.

== Schedule ==
Date	Time	Opponent	Site	Result	Attendance	Source
October 17		at Alabama	Birmingham Fairgrounds; Birmingham, AL	L 0–16		
October 24	2:00 p.m.	Hanover	Burnet Woods; Cincinnati, OH	L 5–9		
October 31	3:05 p.m.	Lebanon University (OH)	Burnet Woods; Cincinnati, OH	W 44–0	1,000	
November 7	2:00 p.m.	Kenyon	League Park; Cincinnati, OH	L 0–63	1,800	
November 14		at Antioch	Yellow Springs, OH	L 11–16	250	
November 26	2:30 p.m.	at Wittenberg	Zimmerman Field; Springfield, OH	T 0–0	700	
