= 1908 Michigan Agricultural Aggies football team =

American college football season

1908 Michigan Agricultural Aggies football
- Conference: Independent
- Record: 6–0–2
- Head coach: Chester Brewer (6th season)
- Captain: Bert Shedd
- Home stadium: College Field

1908 Midwestern college football independents records
	Conf.			Overall
Team	W	L	T	W		L		T
Kirksville Normal		–		8	–	0	–	0
Miami (OH)		–		7	–	0	–	0
Iowa State Normal		–		5	–	0	–	0
Lincoln (MO)		–		2	–	0	–	0
DePaul		–		7	–	0	–	1
St. Mary's (OH)		–		7	–	0	–	1
Butler		–		5	–	0	–	1
Ohio Northern		–		9	–	1	–	0
Fairmount		–		8	–	1	–	0
Notre Dame		–		8	–	1	–	0
Michigan Agricultural		–		6	–	0	–	2
Lake Forest		–		4	–	1	–	1
Saint Louis		–		6	–	2	–	2
Kansas State		–		6	–	2	–	0
Michigan		–		5	–	2	–	1
Marquette		–		4	–	2	–	1
St. Viator		–		5	–	3	–	0
Central Michigan		–		4	–	3	–	0
Mount Union		–		5	–	4	–	1
Doane		–		4	–	4	–	0
South Dakota State		–		3	–	3	–	1
Buchtel		–		3	–	4	–	0
Western State Normal		–		3	–	4	–	0
Western Illinois		–		2	–	3	–	1
Carthage		–		2	–	3	–	0
Haskell		–		3	–	5	–	1
Wittenberg		–		3	–	5	–	1
Ohio		–		3	–	5	–	0
North Dakota Agricultural		–		2	–	3	–	0
Cincinnati		–		1	–	4	–	1
Wabash		–		2	–	6	–	0
Northern Illinois State		–		1	–	5	–	1
Michigan State Normal		–		1	–	4	–	0
Heidelberg		–		1	–	6	–	0
Franklin		–		0	–	9	–	1
Baldwin–Wallace		–		0	–	2	–	0
Chicago P&S		–		0	–	4	–	0

The 1908 Michigan Agricultural Aggies football team represented Michigan Agricultural College (MAC) as an independent during the 1908 college football season. In their fifth year under head coach Chester Brewer, the Aggies compiled a 6–0–2 record and outscored their opponents 205 to 22.

== Schedule ==
Date	Opponent	Site	Result	Attendance	Source
October 3	Michigan School for the Deaf	College Field; East Lansing, MI	W 51–0		
October 10	Michigan	College Field; East Lansing, MI (rivalry)	T 0–0	6,000	
October 17	Western State Normal	College Field; East Lansing, MI	W 35–0		
October 24	at DePaul	DePaul field; Chicago, IL	T 0–0		
October 31	Wabash	College Field; East Lansing, MI	W 6–0		
November 7	at Olivet	Olivet, MI	W 46–2		
November 21	Saginaw Naval Brigade	College Field; East Lansing, MI	W 30–6		
November 26	at Detroit Athletic Club	Detroit, MI	W 37–14		

== Game summaries ==
=== Michigan ===
Michigan at Michigan Agricultural

Team	1	2	Total
Michigan	0	0	0
Michigan Agricultural	0	0	0

- Date: October 10, 1908
- Location: College Field • East Lansing, MI
- Game attendance: 6,000
- Referee: Neil Snow (Michigan)

On October 10, 1908, the Aggies played Michigan to a scoreless tie in East Lansing. It was the fourth game in the Michigan–Michigan State football rivalry, and Michigan had won the three prior meetings by a combined score of 204 to 0. The game was played in front of 6,000 spectators at East Lansing's College Field, and the Aggies' fans "went wild with delight" when the game ended. In Ann Arbor, the result was met with disbelief among Michigan fans who had expected an easy win. The Detroit Free Press called it "the greatest game of football ever seen in this part of the state." The Michigan Alumnus noted that Michigan's line was weak with Germany Schulz, Maurice Crumpacker and William Casey out of the game and opined that the Wolverines were outplayed and would have been defeated had it not been for Dave Allerdice repeatedly punting out of danger
