= 1908 Michigan Wolverines football team =

American college football season

1908 Michigan Wolverines football
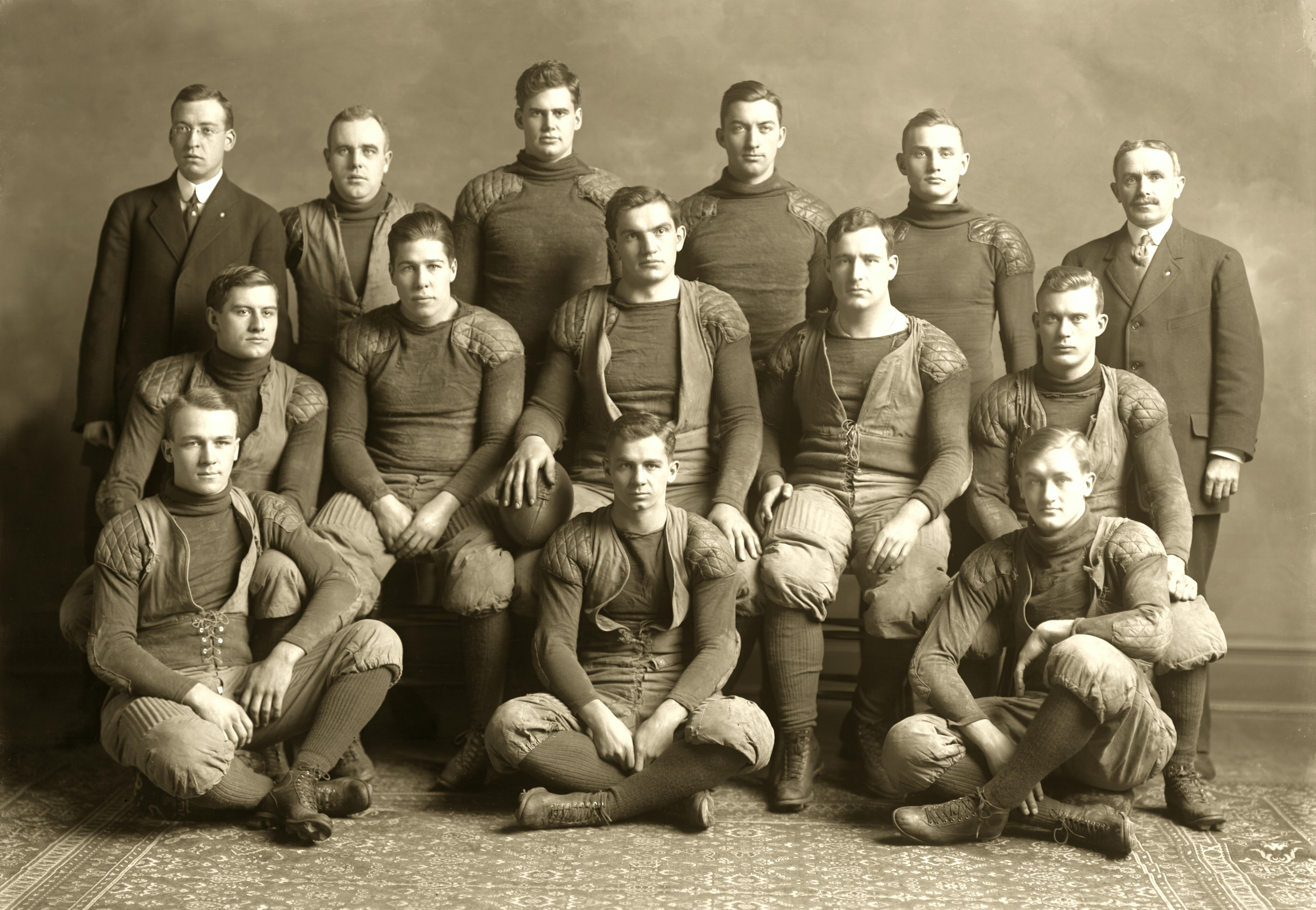
- Conference: Independent
- Record: 5–2–1
- Head coach: Fielding H. Yost (8th season)
- Captain: Germany Schulz
- Home stadium: Ferry Field

1908 Midwestern college football independents records
	Conf.			Overall
Team	W	L	T	W		L		T
Kirksville Normal		–		8	–	0	–	0
Miami (OH)		–		7	–	0	–	0
Iowa State Normal		–		5	–	0	–	0
Lincoln (MO)		–		2	–	0	–	0
DePaul		–		7	–	0	–	1
St. Mary's (OH)		–		7	–	0	–	1
Butler		–		5	–	0	–	1
Ohio Northern		–		9	–	1	–	0
Fairmount		–		8	–	1	–	0
Notre Dame		–		8	–	1	–	0
Michigan Agricultural		–		6	–	0	–	2
Lake Forest		–		4	–	1	–	1
Saint Louis		–		6	–	2	–	2
Kansas State		–		6	–	2	–	0
Michigan		–		5	–	2	–	1
Marquette		–		4	–	2	–	1
St. Viator		–		5	–	3	–	0
Central Michigan		–		4	–	3	–	0
Mount Union		–		5	–	4	–	1
Doane		–		4	–	4	–	0
South Dakota State		–		3	–	3	–	1
Buchtel		–		3	–	4	–	0
Western State Normal		–		3	–	4	–	0
Western Illinois		–		2	–	3	–	1
Carthage		–		2	–	3	–	0
Haskell		–		3	–	5	–	1
Wittenberg		–		3	–	5	–	1
Ohio		–		3	–	5	–	0
North Dakota Agricultural		–		2	–	3	–	0
Cincinnati		–		1	–	4	–	1
Wabash		–		2	–	6	–	0
Northern Illinois State		–		1	–	5	–	1
Michigan State Normal		–		1	–	4	–	0
Heidelberg		–		1	–	6	–	0
Franklin		–		0	–	9	–	1
Baldwin–Wallace		–		0	–	2	–	0
Chicago P&S		–		0	–	4	–	0

The 1908 Michigan Wolverines football team represented the University of Michigan as an independent during the 1908 college football season. The team's head coach was Fielding H. Yost in his eighth year at Michigan. The team compiled a 5–2–1 record, outscored opponents 128 to 81, and held five of seven opponents to six points or less. After opening the season with a 5–0–1 record, and allowing an average of four points per game, the Wolverines lost badly in back-to-back games against the 1908 national champion Penn Quakers (29–0) and Syracuse (28–4).

Team captain and center Germany Schulz was academically ineligible for the first three games of the season, but his performance in the Penn game, withstanding the attack of multiple Penn players focused on knocking him out of the game, was told and re-told by sports writers for decades after the 1908 season had ended. In 1951, Schulz was selected as the greatest center in football history in a poll conducted by the National Football Foundation and became one of the initial inductees into the College Football Hall of Fame.

Right halfback Dave Allerdice, who also handled punting and place-kicking responsibilities for Michigan, was the team's leading scorer with 64 points (exactly half of the team's total), despite missing the final game of the season with a broken collarbone. Allerdice also led the 1909 team in scoring and was a first-team All-American that year. Fullback Sam Davison scored six touchdowns in the team's November 1908 victory over Kentucky State. Davison's total is tied for second in Michigan history for the most touchdowns in a game, trailing Albert Herrnstein's seven touchdowns against the Michigan Aggies in 1902.

== Schedule ==
Date	Opponent	Site	Result	Attendance	Source
October 3	Case	Ferry Field; Ann Arbor, MI	W 16–6		
October 10	at Michigan Agricultural	College Field; East Lansing, MI (rivalry)	T 0–0	6,000	
October 17	Notre Dame	Ferry Field; Ann Arbor, MI (rivalry)	W 12–6		
October 24	at Ohio State	University Park; Columbus, OH (rivalry)	W 10–6		
October 31	Vanderbilt	Ferry Field; Ann Arbor, MI	W 24–6	4,000	
November 7	Kentucky State College	Ferry Field; Ann Arbor, MI	W 62–0		
November 14	Penn^{†}	Ferry Field; Ann Arbor, MI	L 0–29		
November 21	at Syracuse	Archbold Stadium; Syracuse, NY	L 4–28		
^{†}Homecoming

== Season summary ==
=== Schulz's academic ineligibility ===
Team captain Germany Schulz missed the first three games of the season, because he had "three conditions in the engineering course, more than a player can carry and continue his athletic relations". Though "every effort" had been made for two weeks to have the "conditions" removed, those efforts had failed. The eligibility board met and concluded that Schulz could not play until he removed at least two of the conditions. Schulz ultimately had his eligibility restored in late October and was greeted with "cheers from the bleachers" when he appeared in his first practice on October 22, 1907.

=== Case ===
Case at Michigan

Team	1	2	Total
Case	0	6	6
• Michigan	4	12	16

- Date: October 3, 1908
- Location: Ferry Field • Ann Arbor, MI
- Referee: Clayton Teetzel (Michigan)

Michigan opened its 1908 season with a 16–6 victory over the team from Cleveland's Case Scientific School. The game was the 12th meeting between the two programs, and Michigan had won all 11 of the prior games by a combined score of 335 to 31.

The game was scoreless for most of the first half. Near the end of the half, Michigan drove to Case's 10-yard line and took a 4–0 lead on a field goal by Dave Allerdice. Michigan added two touchdowns in the second half, one on a run by William P. Edmunds and the other on a run by Donald W. Green. The latter touchdown was set up by a 45-yard run by Edmunds. Allerdice converted both extra point kicks. Case's score came in the last five minutes of the game and followed a fumbled punt by Albert Benbrook at Michigan's 20-yard line. It was Case's first touchdown against Michigan since 1901. The team that played for Michigan against Case was inexperienced, with Germany Schulz, Sam Davison, William Casey, and William Embs all absent from the lineup. Yost said after the game that "he played only eleven men who knew the signals."

Michigan's lineup against Case was Ranney (left end), Watkins (left tackle), Cully (left guard), Jeffries (center), Primeau (right guard), Benbrook (right tackle), Greene (right end), Wasmund (quarterback), Douglass (left halfback), Allerdice and Torrey (right halfback), and Edmunds (fullback). Clayton Teetzel, an assistant coach for Michigan, was the referee. The game was played in 20-minute halves.

=== At Michigan Agricultural ===
Michigan at Michigan Agricultural

Team	1	2	Total
Michigan	0	0	0
Michigan Agricultural	0	0	0

- Date: October 10, 1908
- Location: College Field • East Lansing, MI
- Game attendance: 6,000
- Referee: Neil Snow (Michigan)

In the second week of the season, Michigan played Michigan Agricultural to a scoreless tie in East Lansing. It was the fourth game in the Michigan–Michigan State football rivalry, and Michigan had won the three prior meetings by a combined score of 204 to 0.

The game was played in front of 6,000 spectators at East Lansing's College Field, and the Aggies' fans "went wild with delight" when the game ended. In Ann Arbor, the result was met with disbelief among Michigan fans who had expected an easy win. The Detroit Free Press called it "the greatest game of football ever seen in this part of the state." The Michigan Alumnus noted that Michigan's line was weak with Germany Schulz, Maurice Crumpacker and William Casey out of the game and opined that the Wolverines were outplayed and would have been defeated had it not been for Dave Allerdice repeatedly punting out of danger.

Michigan's lineup against Michigan Agricultural was Embs (left end), Watkins (left tackle), Kuhr (left guard), Jeffries (center), Primeau (right guard), Benbrook (right tackle), Greene and Lawton (right end), Wasmund (quarterback), Douglass (left halfback), Allerdice (right halfback), and Edmunds (fullback). Neil Snow, the former Michigan All-American, was the referee. The game was played in 25-minute halves.

=== Notre Dame ===
Notre Dame at Michigan

Team	1	2	Total
Notre Dame	0	6	6
• Michigan	8	4	12

- Date: October 17, 1908
- Location: Ferry Field • Ann Arbor, MI
- Referee: Hoagland (Princeton)

On October 17, 1908, Michigan defeated Notre Dame, 12–6, at Ann Arbor's Ferry Field. The game was the eighth meeting in the Michigan–Notre Dame football rivalry. Michigan had won the first seven games (five of them by shutouts) by a combined score of 109 to 10.

Dave Allerdice scored all 12 of Michigan's points on three field goals – two in the first half and one in the last minute of the game. In addition to Allerdice, William Casey and Albert Benbrook were praised for their play against Notre Dame. Notre Dame fullback Vaughan scored the only touchdown of the game on a long run from the 50-yard line.

Michigan's lineup against Notre Dame was Embs (left end), Casey (left tackle), Crumpacker (left guard), Brennan (center), Primeau (right guard), Benbrook (right tackle), Ranney (right end), Wasmund (quarterback), Douglass (left halfback), Allerdice (right halfback), and Davison (fullback). Hoagland of Princeton was the referee. The game was played in 25-minute halves.

=== At Ohio State ===
Michigan at Ohio State

Team	1	2	Total
• Michigan	4	6	10
Ohio State	6	0	6

- Date: October 24, 1908
- Location: University Park •Columbus, OH
- Referee: Neil Snow (Michigan)

For its fourth game, Michigan defeated Ohio State, 10–6, in Columbus. The game was the 10th meeting in the Michigan–Ohio State football rivalry, with Michigan having won eight of the prior meetings and tied once.

For the second consecutive week, right halfback Dave Allerdice accounted for every point scored by the Wolverines. Allerdice scored the team's 10 points on a touchdown, a field goal, and an extra point. After taking a 6–4 lead at halftime, Michigan's touchdown came at the start of the second half and was set up by a trick play. Allerdice faked a field goal, then passed the ball to Roy Ranney from midfield. Ranney was tackled at the two-yard line, and Allerdice ran for the touchdown from there and then kicked the extra point.

Michigan's lineup against Ohio State was Embs (left end), Casey (left tackle), Benbrook (left guard), Schulz (center), Primeau (right guard), Crumpacker (right tackle), Ranney (right end), Wasmund (quarterback), Douglass and Greene (left halfback), Allerdice (right halfback), and Davison (fullback). Hoagland of Princeton was the referee. The game was played in 35-minute halves.

=== Vanderbilt ===
Vanderbilt at Michigan

Team	1	2	Total
Vanderbilt	0	6	6
• Michigan	14	10	24

- Date: October 31, 1908
- Location: Ferry Field • Ann Arbor, MI
- Referee: Bradley Walker (Virginia)

On October 31, 1908, Michigan defeated Vanderbilt at Ferry Field by a score of 24 to 6. The game matched Michigan head coach Fielding H. Yost against his former player and brother-in-law, Dan McGugin. Owing to the relationship between Yost and McGugin, the two teams played nine times between 1905 and 1923, with Michigan winning eight games and tying one.

Right halfback Dave Allerdice accounted for 19 of Michigan's points with a touchdown, three field goals, and two extra points. Fullback Sam Davison also scored a touchdown, accounting for the remaining five points. Michigan's lineup against Vanderbilt was Embs (left end), Casey (left tackle), Benbrook (left guard), Schulz (center), Primeau (right guard), Crumpacker (right tackle), Lawton and Ranney (right end), Wasmund (quarterback), Douglass (left halfback), Allerdice (right halfback), and Davison (fullback). Bradley Walker of Virginia was the referee, and Neil Snow was the umpire. The game was played in 35-minute halves.

=== Kentucky State College ===
Kentucky State College at Michigan

Team	1	2	Total
Kentucky State College	0	0	0
• Michigan	36	26	62

- Date: November 7, 1908
- Location: Ferry Field • Ann Arbor, MI
- Referee: Clayton Teetzel (Michigan)

On November 7, 1908, the Wolverines defeated the team from Kentucky State College by a score of 62 to 0, the team's highest point total since the 1905 "Point-a-Minute" team scored 75 points against Oberlin College. The game was the first and only meeting between the two schools.

The Wolverines scored six touchdowns in the first half and nine overall. Sam Davison was the scoring leader with 30 points on six touchdowns. Dave Allerdice contributed 17 points on two field goals and nine extra points. Donald W. Green, Maurice E. Crumpacker, and William Embs also scored touchdowns for Michigan. According to The Michigan Alumnus, Embs "played the greatest game of his career and was with Schulz at the bottom of every mix-up." After taking a 36–0 lead at halftime, there was a "perceptible letup" in the second half, as Yost played his substitutes, including Frank Linthicum and Thomas Riley.

Michigan's lineup against Kentucky State was Linthicum and Embs (left end), Casey (left tackle), Benbrook (left guard), Schulz (center), Primeau, Brennan and Riley (right guard), Crumpacker (right tackle), Ranney and Watson (right end), Wasmund and Cunningham (quarterback), Green (left halfback), Allerdice (right halfback), and Davison (fullback). Clayton Teetzel of Michigan was the referee. The game was played in 35-minute halves.

=== Penn ===
Penn at Michigan

Team	1	2	Total
• Penn	6	23	29
Michigan	0	0	0

- Date: November 14, 1908
- Location: Ferry Field • Ann Arbor, MI
- Referee: Clayton Teetzel (Michigan)

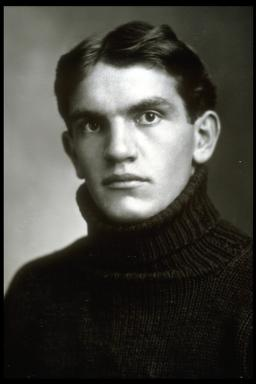
Germany Schulz was selected by the National Football Foundation as the greatest center of all time.

On November 14, 1908, Michigan lost to the Penn Quakers by a score of 29–0. After leaving the Big Ten Conference, Michigan played annual rivalry games against Penn at or near the end of the season. Penn was one of the dominant football programs of the era, winning seven national championships between 1894 and 1912 (including the 1908 national championship). Penn shut out the Wolverines in both 1906 (17–0) and 1907 (6–0), and Michigan hoped to avenge those losses in 1908. Instead, the Wolverines met the worst defeat of the Yost era.

Michigan's hopes to beat Penn were based to a large extent on its star center Germany Schulz. Penn announced before the game that it would bring four available centers so there "might be a fresh antagonist facing the Michigan captain throughout the game." Special trains from all over Michigan poured large crowds into Ann Arbor, and the crowd was said to be "the largest attendance which has been on Ferry Field." Though Michigan was beaten, Schulz's performance, and the pummeling he took from the Penn team, was recounted many times in the following decades.

In one of the few contemporaneous accounts, the Toledo Blade wrote that the Penn players, knowing that Schulz was "the power in the Michigan game," focused their energy on wearing him down. There were two Penn players who "did nothing but look after Schultz." And they did more than look: "In every scrimmage, he was bumped as hard as the rules allowed, and maybe a little harder, when nobody was looking. ... Every time Schultz started anywhere he would find a couple of Penn men digging headfirst into his stomach. They would elbow him, jam him with the straight arm, and if he went to the ground in a scrimmage there generally would be a knee grinding him in the wind. Pretty soon Schultz began to show it. ... He limped along pitifully. He couldn't run. His strength was almost gone. When he did tackle, his groan of pain could almost be heard in the stands." The Michigan fans continued to urge Schulz with yells of "G-r-r-r-r-rah, Schultz!"

At halftime, the trainers found "a mass of black and blue spots" on Schulz. His "face was distorted with bumps", and there were "welts on his back and groin." As the second half started, Schulz insisted he felt better and returned to the game. But the attack continued. "Another scrimmage and two more Penn men were after him again. He went into the play and for an instant, his strength came back, but it couldn't last, and it didn't." Yost finally sent in a substitute, and Schulz limped to the sideline and walked slowly away "with head bowed and hands to his stomach." When the "rubbers" removed his togs and examined him, "they marveled that he was able to walk." In the end, Schulz "didn't say a word — big tears rolled down as he lay there; Schultz was thoroughly beaten, but it took the entire Pennsylvania eleven to do it."

Penn's captain, Bill Hollenback, said: "This fellow Schulz is a monster in size and a perfect athlete. He is both wonderfully agile and fast for a man of his size. In our game with Michigan, we had two men instructed to play against Schulz and at times three and four were opposed to him. For some time, he handed out as much as we passed to him in the roughing end of the game. He was here, there and everywhere. He did most of the tackling. He broke up innumerable plays. He was the star of the contest until the continued battering of our men injured him to such an extent that he had to retire. The rest was easy." Coach Yost said of Schulz's performance: "He gave the greatest one-man exhibition of courage I ever saw on a football field."

From the 1920s through the 1950s, the story was told, re-told and likely embellished in columns by Grantland Rice, Art Carlson, Frank Blair and Dave Lewis — more than one of them writing that they had seen the game in person. In Carlson's 1925 account, "the giant center had been rendered practically useless from the Penn attack", but refused to leave the game. Carlson recalled Schulz's removal from the game this way: "It was a scene I shall never forget—the giant Schulz, towering above the rest of the combatants, literally dragged off the field, tears streaming down his mud-spattered cheeks as he frantically protested his removal from the game."

In 1942, Grantland Rice wrote that Schulz held the Penn team in check for 50 minutes and that the score was 0–0 when Schulz "left the field a battered wreck." (In fact, contemporaneous accounts show the score was 6–0 at halftime.)

In Frank Blair's 1951 telling, Schulz played with the "strength of Samson", and Penn "put five men -- center, both guards and both tackles—on the Wolverine giant." According to Blair, who claimed to have attended the game as a high school student, Schulz played like a madman, making nearly all the tackles for 50 minutes, and Penn was held scoreless until Schulz was "carried from the field."

In a 1954 article, sports writer Dave Lewis wrote that Penn assigned five players to the task of mowing down Schulz. Lewis quoted Schulz as having said: "I can still see those five pairs of eyes staring at me every time we lined up ... ready to tear me apart." A few months before his death, Schulz told Detroit News sports writer H.G. Salsinger that he had only one regret: "I wish I could have lasted 10 minutes longer. That was one game I wanted to finish."

Right halfback Dave Allerdice also took a beating in the game. He played the entire game despite breaking his collarbone early in the game. The Detroit Free Press wrote: "When the students here learned this morning that Allerdice, Michigan's fullback, had played the entire game with Pennsylvania yesterday with a broken collar bone, they could not comprehend that they had unconsciously witnessed the greatest act of heroism ever displayed on the gridiron."

Michigan's lineup against Penn was Embs (left end), Casey (left tackle), Benbrook (left guard), Schulz and Brennan (center), Riley (right guard), Crumpacker (right tackle), Linthicum (right end), Wasmund (quarterback), Douglass (left halfback), Allerdice (right halfback), and Davison (fullback). Langford of Trinity was the referee. The game was played in 35-minute halves.

=== At Syracuse ===
Michigan at Syracuse

Team	1	2	Total
Michigan	4	0	4
• Syracuse	16	12	28

- Date: November 21, 1908
- Location: Archbold Stadium •Syracuse, NY
- Referee: Fultz (Brown)

Michigan concluded its 1908 season with a 28–4 loss on the road against Syracuse. The game was the first played between the schools. Michigan came into the game severely handicapped by injuries. Right halfback Dave Allerdice had broken his collarbone against Penn and was unable to play. Germany Schulz had been badly bruised and battered in the Penn game, though he did start against Syracuse. Michigan took a 4–0 lead on a field goal by Sam Davison, but Syracuse followed with 28 unanswered points.

Michigan's lineup against Syracuse was Embs (left end), Casey (left tackle), Benbrook (left guard), Schulz (center), Riley (right guard), Crumpacker (right tackle), Ranney (right end), Wasmund (quarterback), Douglass (left halfback), Linthicum (right halfback), and Davison (fullback). Fultz of Brown was the referee. The game was played in 35-minute halves.

=== Post-season ===
The Detroit Free Press described the season-ending losses to Penn and Syracuse as "the worst defeats in twenty years of the gridiron sport" at Michigan. Some Michigan fans argued that a bias against football among the university's faculty was responsible for the poor showing. In early December 1908, the Chicago Daily Tribune reported: "It is alleged that the faculty is working against the football men in every possible way. It is said by some of the students that the faculty takes delight in 'conning' a man who is active in athletics." Dean Reed of Michigan's literary department rejected the contention as "absurd." He insisted that athletes were given "at least an even chance" with the other students, and, if anything, "a slight advantage over them."

Michigan head coach Fielding H. Yost also expressed his dissatisfaction. After the season ended, Yost traveled to the east to help Army prepare for its game against Navy. He also agreed to accept an off-season position as the general manager of the Great Falls River and Power Company, a company seeking to develop a hydroelectric plant and build an electric short line from Chattanooga to Nashville. On December 5, 1908, he returned to Ann Arbor and announced that he was considering leaving Michigan if things did not improve in 1909—the final year of his five-year contract. Yost said, "If things don't clear up out here, I don't think I shall care to sign up again." The Chicago Daily Tribune reported on Yost's comments: "That was all the coach would say, but it is significant."

The only Michigan player to receive recognition on post-season All-American teams was center Germany Schulz. Schulz was overlooked on Walter Camp's All-American team, but he was selected as a first-team All-American by at least 20 other selectors, including the New York World, The Philadelphia Inquirer, Tom Thorpe, Philadelphia Times, and Fielding Yost. Schulz was also selected as a first-team player on the All-Western teams of E. C. Patterson (for Collier's Weekly) and Walter Eckersall (for the Chicago Daily Tribune).

On December 6, 1908, Dave Allerdice was elected by the 12 lettermen from the 1908 team as the captain of the 1909 team. He defeated quarterback William Wasmund who had advocated more liberal distribution of varsity "M" letters to football players.

== Players ==
=== Varsity letter winners ===
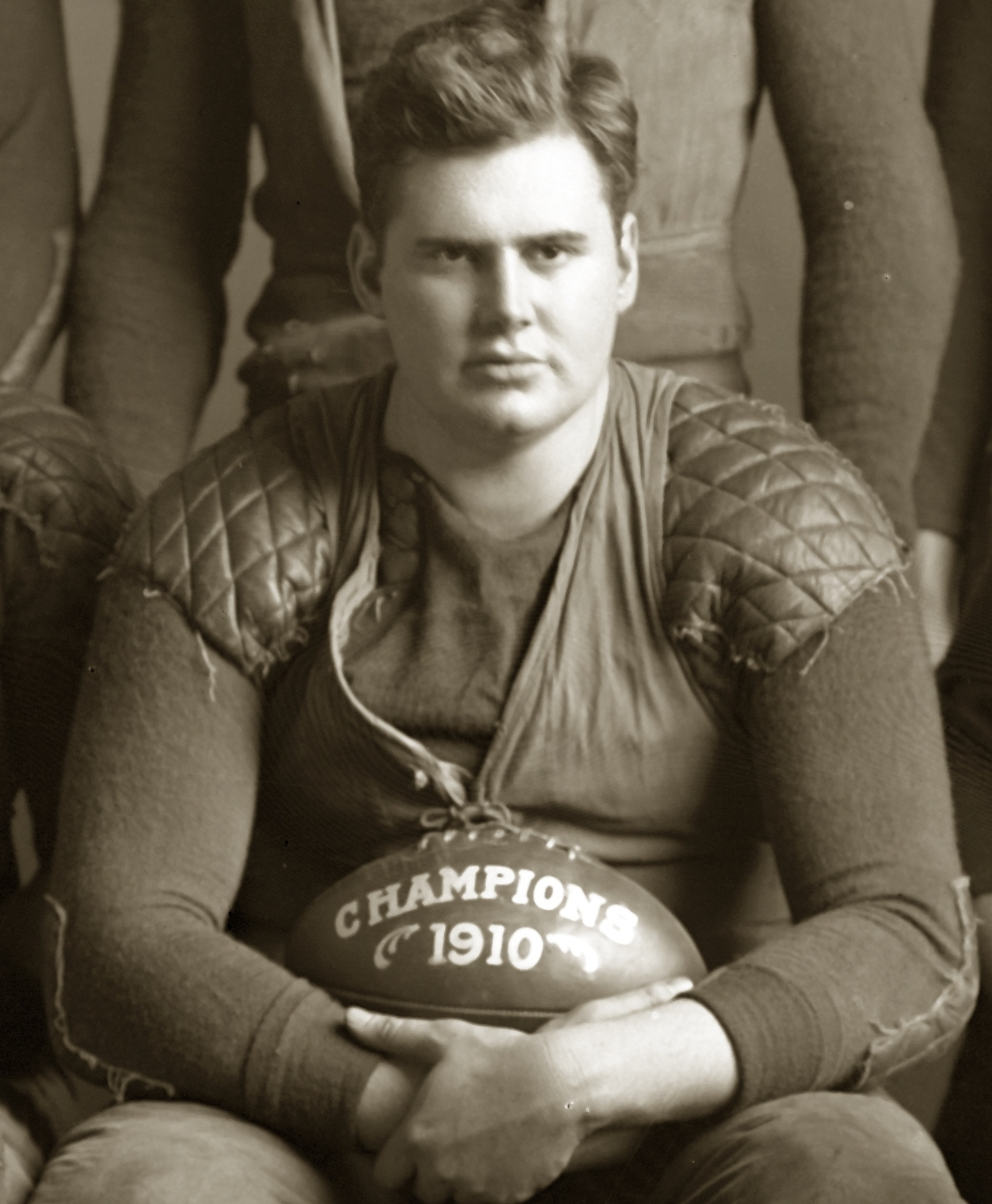
Albert Benbrook was later inducted into the College Football Hall of Fame.

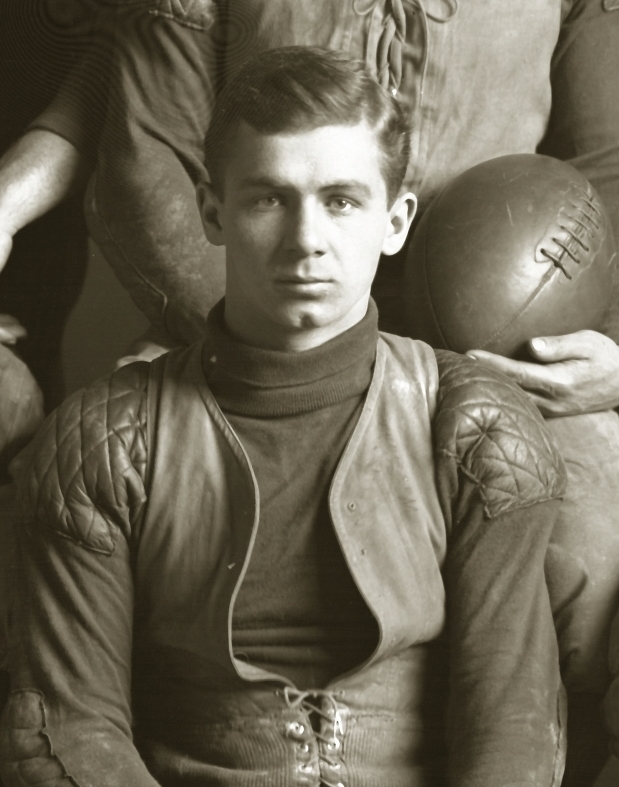
Michigan quarterback Billy Wasmund later became the head coach of the Texas Longhorns.

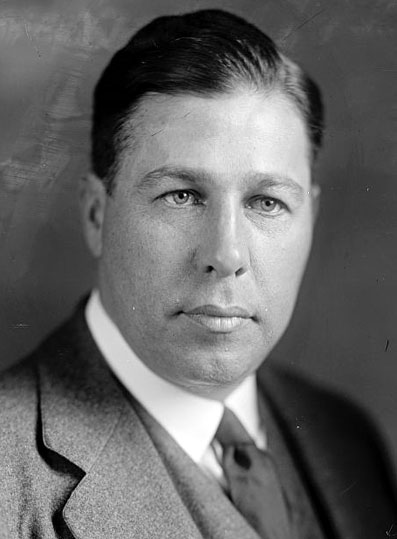
Lineman Maurice E. Crumpacker later became a U.S. Congressman from Oregon.

The following 12 players received varsity "M" letters for their participation on the 1908 football team:

- Dave Allerdice, Indianapolis, Indiana – started 7 games at right halfback
- Albert Benbrook, Chicago, Illinois – started 5 games at left guard, 3 at right tackle
- William Mallory Casey, Cedar Falls, Iowa – started 6 games at left tackle
- Maurice E. Crumpacker, Valparaiso, Indiana – started 5 games at right tackle, 1 game at left guard
- Samuel J. Davison, Alpena, Michigan – started 6 games at fullback
- Prentiss Douglass, Martinsville, Illinois – started 7 games at left halfback
- William John Embs, Escanaba, Michigan – started 7 games at left end
- Frank Linthicum, Washington, D.C. – started 1 game at right end, 1 game at right halfback
- Leroy E. Ranney, Greenville, Michigan – started 5 games at right end, 1 game at left end
- Thomas J. Riley, Escanaba, Michigan – started 2 games at right guard
- Germany Schulz, Fort Wayne, Indiana – started 5 games at center
- William Wasmund, Detroit, MI – started 8 games at quarterback

=== Reserves ===
The following 27 players received "R" letters for their participation as Reserves on the 1908 football team:

- Arthur E. Bertrand, Muskegon, Michigan
- Stanley Borleske, Spokane, Washington
- Hubert A. Brennan, L'Anse, Michigan – started 1 game at center
- Fay G. Clark, San Bernardino, California
- John D. Clarkson, Tecumseh, Michigan
- Ralph Culley, Avon, New York – started 1 game at left guard
- Wilbur M. Cunningham, Benton Harbor, Michigan
- Donald D. Duncanson, Cass City, Michigan
- Abraham B. Feldman, Eveleth, Minnesota
- Charles C. Freeney, Ida Grove, Iowa
- Donald W. Green, Saginaw, Michigan – started 2 games at right end, 1 game at left halfback
- James M. Hill, Rockville, Indiana
- Allen Jeffery, Albion, Michigan – started 2 games at center
- Spencer D. Kelley, Mt. Clemens, Michigan
- William Kuhr, Chinook, Montana – started 1 game at left guard
- Fred Lawton, Detroit, MI
- George M. Lawton, Detroit, MI
- Harold Lillie, Grand Haven, Michigan
- Leo C. Lillie, Grand Haven, MI
- Fred L. Liskow, Saginaw, MI
- Gregory Peck Sr., San Diego, California (father of the film actor Gregory Peck)
- Ernest A. Pederson, Iron Mountain, Michigan
- Joseph Primeau, Marquette, Michigan – started 6 games at right guard
- John Byron Rogers, Ozark, Michigan
- Roe D. Watson, Alton, Illinois
- Theodore A. Weager, Interlaken, New York
- Stanfield Wells, Brewster, Michigan
- Henry L. Wenner, Tiffin, Ohio

=== Others ===
- William P. Edmunds – started 2 games at fullback
- Hugh S. Gamble, Yankton, South Dakota
- James K. Watkins – started 2 games at left tackle

=== Scoring leaders ===
Player	Touchdowns	Extra points	Field goals	Points
Dave Allerdice	2	14	10	64
Sam Davison	7	0	1	39
Donald W. Greene	2	0	0	10
William P. Edmunds	1	0	0	5
Maurice E. Crumpacker	1	0	0	5
William J. Embs	1	0	0	5
Totals	14	14	11	128

== Awards and honors ==
- Captain: Germany Schulz
- All-Americans: Germany Schulz (Consensus, 2nd team; New York World, 1st team; The Philadelphia Inquirer, 1st team; Fielding H. Yost, 1st team; Tom Thorpe, 1st team; Philadelphia Times, 1st team)

== Coaching staff ==
- Head coach: Fielding H. Yost
- Trainer: Keene Fitzpatrick
- Assistant coaches: Curtis Redden, Neil Snow, Clayton Teetzel
- Manager: Thomas Clancy
