= 1908 DePaul Blue Demons football team =

American college football season

1908 DePaul Blue Demons football
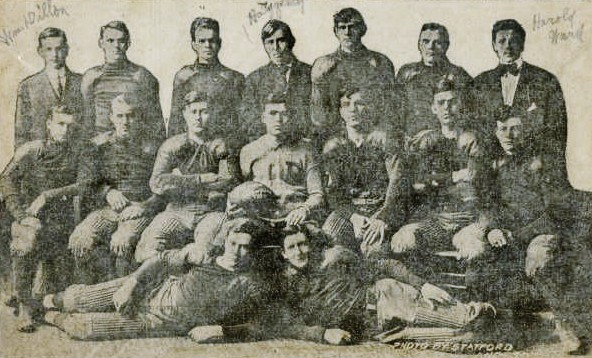
- Conference: Independent
- Record: 7–0–1
- Head coach: Frank Haggerty (2nd season)
- Home stadium: DePaul field

1908 Midwestern college football independents records
	Conf.			Overall
Team	W	L	T	W		L		T
Kirksville Normal		–		8	–	0	–	0
Miami (OH)		–		7	–	0	–	0
Iowa State Normal		–		5	–	0	–	0
Lincoln (MO)		–		2	–	0	–	0
DePaul		–		7	–	0	–	1
St. Mary's (OH)		–		7	–	0	–	1
Butler		–		5	–	0	–	1
Ohio Northern		–		9	–	1	–	0
Fairmount		–		8	–	1	–	0
Notre Dame		–		8	–	1	–	0
Michigan Agricultural		–		6	–	0	–	2
Lake Forest		–		4	–	1	–	1
Saint Louis		–		6	–	2	–	2
Kansas State		–		6	–	2	–	0
Michigan		–		5	–	2	–	1
Marquette		–		4	–	2	–	1
St. Viator		–		5	–	3	–	0
Central Michigan		–		4	–	3	–	0
Mount Union		–		5	–	4	–	1
Doane		–		4	–	4	–	0
South Dakota State		–		3	–	3	–	1
Buchtel		–		3	–	4	–	0
Western State Normal		–		3	–	4	–	0
Western Illinois		–		2	–	3	–	1
Carthage		–		2	–	3	–	0
Haskell		–		3	–	5	–	1
Wittenberg		–		3	–	5	–	1
Ohio		–		3	–	5	–	0
North Dakota Agricultural		–		2	–	3	–	0
Cincinnati		–		1	–	4	–	1
Wabash		–		2	–	6	–	0
Northern Illinois State		–		1	–	5	–	1
Michigan State Normal		–		1	–	4	–	0
Heidelberg		–		1	–	6	–	0
Franklin		–		0	–	9	–	1
Baldwin–Wallace		–		0	–	2	–	0
Chicago P&S		–		0	–	4	–	0

The 1908 DePaul Blue Demons football team was an American football team that represented DePaul University as an independent during the 1908 college football season. In its second season under head coach Frank Haggerty, the team compiled a 7–0–1 record.

== Schedule ==
Date	Opponent	Site	Result	Attendance	Source
October 3	Knox	DePaul field; Chicago, IL	W 34–4		
October 10	Chicago Physicians and Surgeons	Chicago, IL	W 42–0		
October 17	at St. John's Military Academy	Delafield, WI	W 11–9		
October 24	Michigan Agricultural	DePaul field; Chicago, IL	T 0–0		
	Carroll (WI)	Chicago, IL	W 46–5		
November 7	Lake Forest	DePaul field; Chicago, IL	W 18–11		
November 14	Beloit	DePaul field; Chicago, IL	W 20–5		
November 21	Illinois State Normal	DePaul field; Chicago, IL	W 6–0		
