= 1908 Northern Illinois State Normal football team =

American college football season

1908 Northern Illinois State Normal football
- Conference: Independent
- Record: 1–5–1
- Head coach: Nelson A. Kellogg (3rd season)
- Captain: Irwin Madden
- Home stadium: Glidden Field

1908 Midwestern college football independents records
	Conf.			Overall
Team	W	L	T	W		L		T
Kirksville Normal		–		8	–	0	–	0
Miami (OH)		–		7	–	0	–	0
Iowa State Normal		–		5	–	0	–	0
Lincoln (MO)		–		2	–	0	–	0
DePaul		–		7	–	0	–	1
St. Mary's (OH)		–		7	–	0	–	1
Butler		–		5	–	0	–	1
Ohio Northern		–		9	–	1	–	0
Fairmount		–		8	–	1	–	0
Notre Dame		–		8	–	1	–	0
Michigan Agricultural		–		6	–	0	–	2
Lake Forest		–		4	–	1	–	1
Saint Louis		–		6	–	2	–	2
Kansas State		–		6	–	2	–	0
Michigan		–		5	–	2	–	1
Marquette		–		4	–	2	–	1
St. Viator		–		5	–	3	–	0
Central Michigan		–		4	–	3	–	0
Mount Union		–		5	–	4	–	1
Doane		–		4	–	4	–	0
South Dakota State		–		3	–	3	–	1
Buchtel		–		3	–	4	–	0
Western State Normal		–		3	–	4	–	0
Western Illinois		–		2	–	3	–	1
Carthage		–		2	–	3	–	0
Haskell		–		3	–	5	–	1
Wittenberg		–		3	–	5	–	1
Ohio		–		3	–	5	–	0
North Dakota Agricultural		–		2	–	3	–	0
Cincinnati		–		1	–	4	–	1
Wabash		–		2	–	6	–	0
Northern Illinois State		–		1	–	5	–	1
Michigan State Normal		–		1	–	4	–	0
Heidelberg		–		1	–	6	–	0
Franklin		–		0	–	9	–	1
Baldwin–Wallace		–		0	–	2	–	0
Chicago P&S		–		0	–	4	–	0

The 1908 Northern Illinois State Normal football team represented Northern Illinois State Normal College as an independent in the 1908 college football season. They were led by third-year head coach Nelson A. Kellogg and played their home games at Glidden Field, located on the east end of campus. The team finished the season with a 1–5–1 record. Irwin Madden was the team's captain.

== Schedule ==
Date	Opponent	Site	Result	Source
September 26	Rochelle High School	Rochelle, IL	L 0–5	
October 3	at St. Joseph's College	Dubuque, IA	L 0–16	
October 10	Alumni	Glidden Field; DeKalb, IL	L 0–24	
October 17	at East Aurora High School	Aurora, IL	L 5–12	
November 7	Sandwich High School	Glidden Field; DeKalb, IL	W 20–0	
November 11	DeKalb All-Stars	Glidden Field; DeKalb, IL	L 0–18	
November 14	at Elgin High School	Elgin, IL	T 6–6	
