= 1908 Ohio Green and White football team =

American college football season

1908 Ohio Green and White football
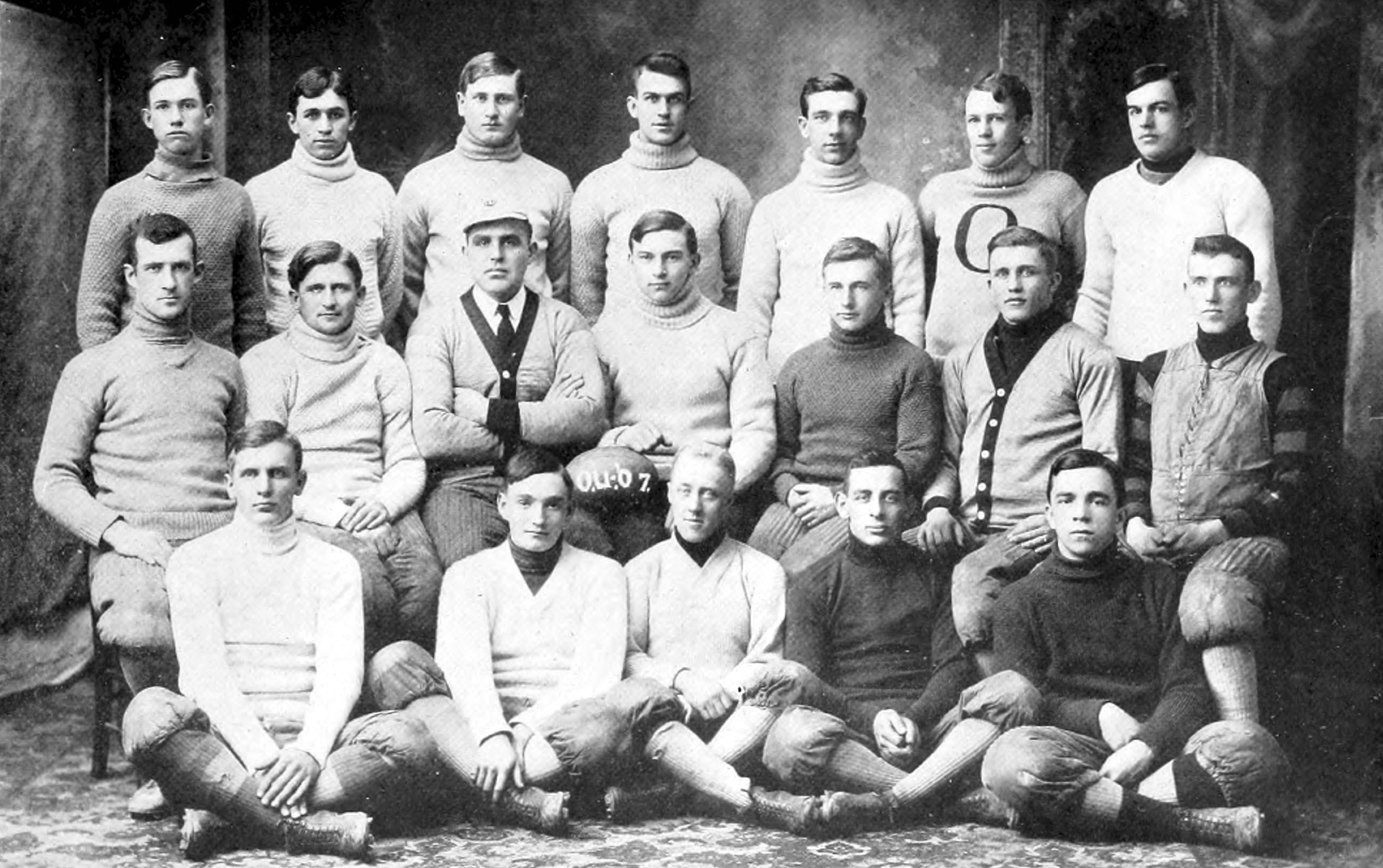
- Conference: Independent
- Record: 3–5
- Head coach: Arthur McFarland (3rd season)

1908 Midwestern college football independents records
	Conf.			Overall
Team	W	L	T	W		L		T
Kirksville Normal		–		8	–	0	–	0
Miami (OH)		–		7	–	0	–	0
Iowa State Normal		–		5	–	0	–	0
Lincoln (MO)		–		2	–	0	–	0
DePaul		–		7	–	0	–	1
St. Mary's (OH)		–		7	–	0	–	1
Butler		–		5	–	0	–	1
Ohio Northern		–		9	–	1	–	0
Fairmount		–		8	–	1	–	0
Notre Dame		–		8	–	1	–	0
Michigan Agricultural		–		6	–	0	–	2
Lake Forest		–		4	–	1	–	1
Saint Louis		–		6	–	2	–	2
Kansas State		–		6	–	2	–	0
Michigan		–		5	–	2	–	1
Marquette		–		4	–	2	–	1
St. Viator		–		5	–	3	–	0
Central Michigan		–		4	–	3	–	0
Mount Union		–		5	–	4	–	1
Doane		–		4	–	4	–	0
South Dakota State		–		3	–	3	–	1
Buchtel		–		3	–	4	–	0
Western State Normal		–		3	–	4	–	0
Western Illinois		–		2	–	3	–	1
Carthage		–		2	–	3	–	0
Haskell		–		3	–	5	–	1
Wittenberg		–		3	–	5	–	1
Ohio		–		3	–	5	–	0
North Dakota Agricultural		–		2	–	3	–	0
Cincinnati		–		1	–	4	–	1
Wabash		–		2	–	6	–	0
Northern Illinois State		–		1	–	5	–	1
Michigan State Normal		–		1	–	4	–	0
Heidelberg		–		1	–	6	–	0
Franklin		–		0	–	9	–	1
Baldwin–Wallace		–		0	–	2	–	0
Chicago P&S		–		0	–	4	–	0

The 1908 Ohio Green and White football team represented Ohio University in the 1908 college football season as an independent. Led by third-year head coach Arthur McFarland, the Green and White compiled a record of 3–5, but outscored opponents 100–65.

== Schedule ==
Date	Opponent	Site	Result
	at Ohio Northern	Ada, OH	L 0–10
October 3	Marshall	Athens, OH (rivalry)	W 59–0
October 17	Miami (OH)	Athens, OH (rivalry)	L 0–5
October 24	Denison		L 0–12
November 6	Mount Union	Athens, OH	W 15–12
	Otterbein		L 5–6
November 20	Wittenberg	Athens, OH	W 21–5
	Parkersburg High School		L 0–15
