= 1908 Chicago Physicians and Surgeons football team =

American college football season

1908 Chicago Physicians and Surgeons football
- Conference: Independent
- Record: 0–4

1908 Midwestern college football independents records
	Conf.			Overall
Team	W	L	T	W		L		T
Kirksville Normal		–		8	–	0	–	0
Miami (OH)		–		7	–	0	–	0
Iowa State Normal		–		5	–	0	–	0
Lincoln (MO)		–		2	–	0	–	0
DePaul		–		7	–	0	–	1
St. Mary's (OH)		–		7	–	0	–	1
Butler		–		5	–	0	–	1
Ohio Northern		–		9	–	1	–	0
Fairmount		–		8	–	1	–	0
Notre Dame		–		8	–	1	–	0
Michigan Agricultural		–		6	–	0	–	2
Lake Forest		–		4	–	1	–	1
Saint Louis		–		6	–	2	–	2
Kansas State		–		6	–	2	–	0
Michigan		–		5	–	2	–	1
Marquette		–		4	–	2	–	1
St. Viator		–		5	–	3	–	0
Central Michigan		–		4	–	3	–	0
Mount Union		–		5	–	4	–	1
Doane		–		4	–	4	–	0
South Dakota State		–		3	–	3	–	1
Buchtel		–		3	–	4	–	0
Western State Normal		–		3	–	4	–	0
Western Illinois		–		2	–	3	–	1
Carthage		–		2	–	3	–	0
Haskell		–		3	–	5	–	1
Wittenberg		–		3	–	5	–	1
Ohio		–		3	–	5	–	0
North Dakota Agricultural		–		2	–	3	–	0
Cincinnati		–		1	–	4	–	1
Wabash		–		2	–	6	–	0
Northern Illinois State		–		1	–	5	–	1
Michigan State Normal		–		1	–	4	–	0
Heidelberg		–		1	–	6	–	0
Franklin		–		0	–	9	–	1
Baldwin–Wallace		–		0	–	2	–	0
Chicago P&S		–		0	–	4	–	0

The 1908 Chicago Physicians and Surgeons football team represented the College of Physicians and Surgeons of Chicago during the 1908 college football season. In their final season of existence, Chicago P&S compiled a 0–4 record, and scored only 10 points all season while surrendering 204. Their most notable game was played against an 8–1 Notre Dame team, which scored 88 unanswered points against them.

== Schedule ==
Date	Opponent	Site	Result	Source
October 10	DePaul	DePaul Field; Chicago, IL	L 0–42	
October 17	at Lake Forest	Lake Forest, IL	L 10–45	
October 24	at Notre Dame	Cartier Field; Notre Dame, IN	L 0–88	
November 8	vs. St. Viator	Kankakee, IL	L 0–29	

== Roster ==
This Roster was compiled from an account of the Notre Dame contest in the Inter Ocean and against St. Viator in the Chicago Tribune.

- McGinnis, left end, right end
- Hurka, left tackle, right tackle
- Elliott, left guard, right guard
- Herrick, center, left guard
- Puffer, right guard, center
- Kestinger, right tackle, left end
- O'Brien, right end, left tackle
- Sorley, quarterback
- Sterling, quarterback
- Ehland, left halfback
- Smith, left halfback
- McDodle, right halfback
- Gelrick, right halfback
- Langan, right halfback
- Hammond, fullback
- Martin, fullback
