= 1908 Fairmount Wheatshockers football team =

American college football season

1908 Fairmount Wheatshockers football
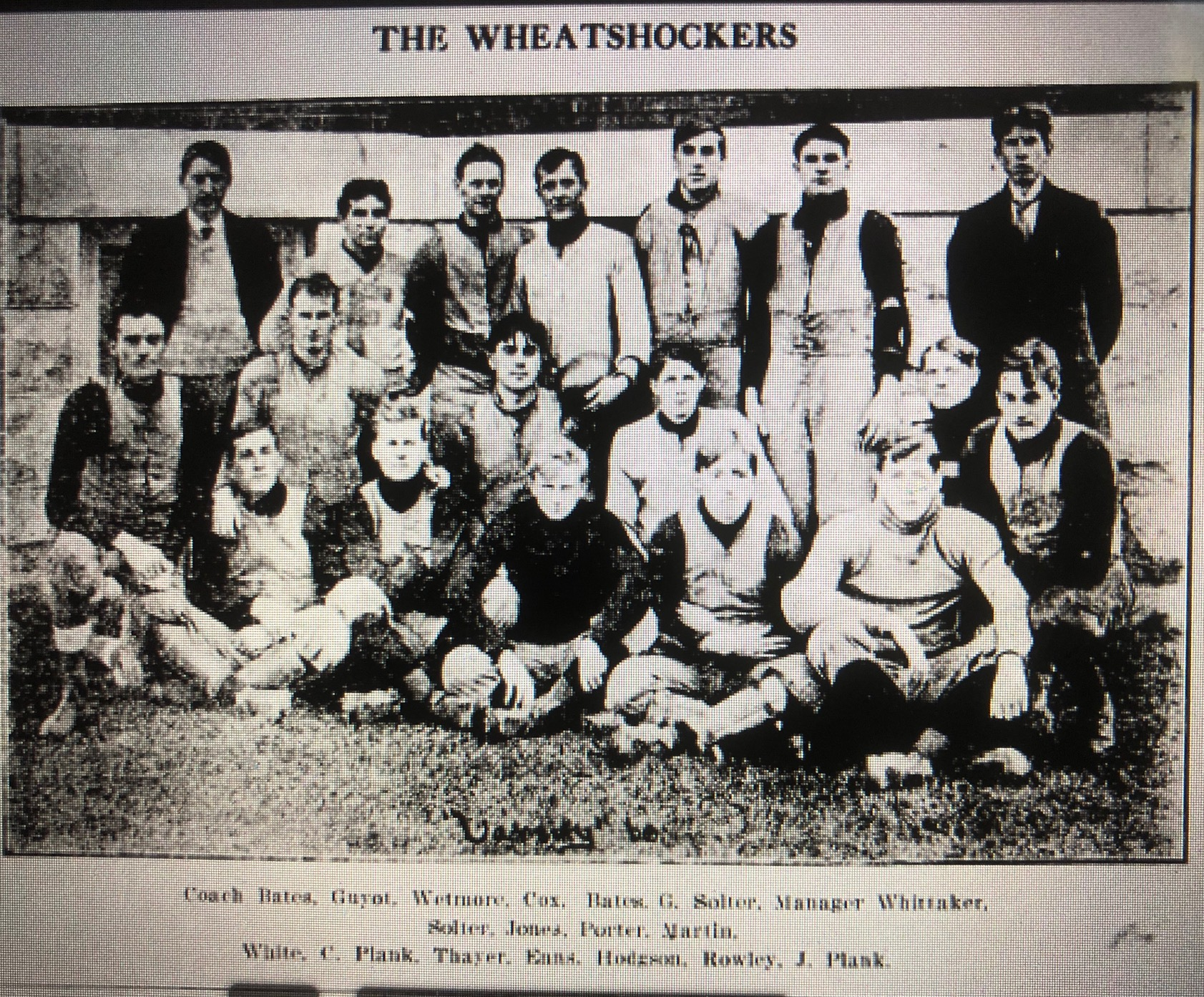
- Conference: Independent
- Record: 8–1
- Head coach: Willis Bates (4th season)

1908 Midwestern college football independents records
	Conf.			Overall
Team	W	L	T	W		L		T
Kirksville Normal		–		8	–	0	–	0
Miami (OH)		–		7	–	0	–	0
Iowa State Normal		–		5	–	0	–	0
Lincoln (MO)		–		2	–	0	–	0
DePaul		–		7	–	0	–	1
St. Mary's (OH)		–		7	–	0	–	1
Butler		–		5	–	0	–	1
Ohio Northern		–		9	–	1	–	0
Fairmount		–		8	–	1	–	0
Notre Dame		–		8	–	1	–	0
Michigan Agricultural		–		6	–	0	–	2
Lake Forest		–		4	–	1	–	1
Saint Louis		–		6	–	2	–	2
Kansas State		–		6	–	2	–	0
Michigan		–		5	–	2	–	1
Marquette		–		4	–	2	–	1
St. Viator		–		5	–	3	–	0
Central Michigan		–		4	–	3	–	0
Mount Union		–		5	–	4	–	1
Doane		–		4	–	4	–	0
South Dakota State		–		3	–	3	–	1
Buchtel		–		3	–	4	–	0
Western State Normal		–		3	–	4	–	0
Western Illinois		–		2	–	3	–	1
Carthage		–		2	–	3	–	0
Haskell		–		3	–	5	–	1
Wittenberg		–		3	–	5	–	1
Ohio		–		3	–	5	–	0
North Dakota Agricultural		–		2	–	3	–	0
Cincinnati		–		1	–	4	–	1
Wabash		–		2	–	6	–	0
Northern Illinois State		–		1	–	5	–	1
Michigan State Normal		–		1	–	4	–	0
Heidelberg		–		1	–	6	–	0
Franklin		–		0	–	9	–	1
Baldwin–Wallace		–		0	–	2	–	0
Chicago P&S		–		0	–	4	–	0

The 1908 Fairmount Wheatshockers football team was an American football team that represented Fairmount College (now known as Wichita State University) as an independent during the 1908 college football season. In its fourth season under head coach Willis Bates, the team compiled an 8–1 record and outscored opponents by a total of 256 to 32. Its only loss was to Oklahoma.

== Schedule ==
Date	Opponent	Site	Result	Source
October 7	Kansas Wesleyan	Salina, KS	W 34–0	
October 10	Salt City Business College	Wichita, KS	W 61–0	
October 14	at College of Emporia	Emporia, KS	W 18–0	
October 16	at Kansas State Normal	Emporia, KS	W 30–4	
October 26	at Oklahoma Christian University	Enid, OK	W 17–0	
October 31	Drury	Wichita, KS	W 50–0	
November 13	Washburn	Wichita, KS	W 25–16	
November 19	Oklahoma	Wichita, KS	L 4–12	
November 28	Southwestern (KS)		W 17–0	
