= Clifford Bell (American football) =

American football player and coach (1880–1936)

Biographical details
- Born: March 15, 1880; Biggsville, Illinois, U.S.
- Died: August 1, 1936 (aged 56)

Playing career

Football
- 1900: Illinois
- Position: Fullback

Coaching career (HC unless noted)

Football
- 1905–1906: Monmouth (IL)
- 1907–1909: Kirksville Normal
- 1911–1915: Cleveland East Tech HS (OH)
- 1916–1920: Cleveland West Tech HS (OH)

Baseball
- 1906: Monmouth (IL)

Head coaching record
- Overall: 31–8 (college football); 8–7–1 (college baseball)

Oscar Clifford Bell (March 15, 1880 – August 1, 1936) was an American football player and coach. He served as the head football coach at Monmouth College in Monmouth, Illinois, where he led his team to two successful seasons in 1905 and 1906. His squads recorded a record of 18–1. In 1907, he moved to Kirksville Normal School—now known as Truman State University—in Kirksville, Missouri, where his teams compiled a record of 13–7 in three seasons. Bell played college football for one season, in 1900, at the University of Illinois.
