= 1908 college football season =

American college football season

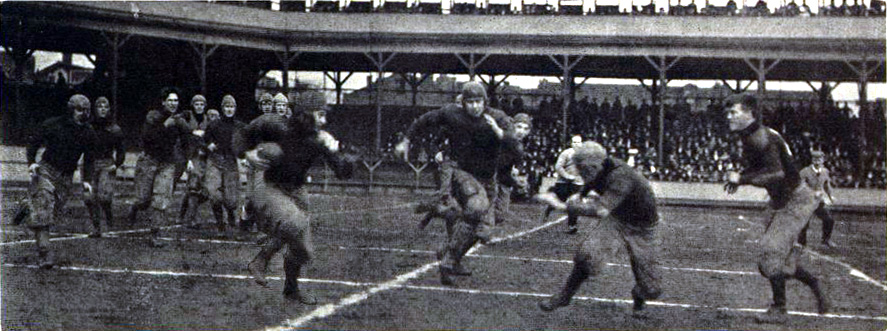
- Pitt vs. West Virginia
- Total No. of teams: 67
- Regular season: September 19 to November 28
- Champion: Pennsylvania

The 1908 college football season ran from Saturday, September 19, to November 28. The Penn Quakers and the Harvard Crimson each finished the season unbeaten but with one tied. The LSU Tigers went unbeaten and untied against a weaker opposition. All three teams were named national champions retroactively by various organizations. Only Pennsylvania officially claims a national championship for the 1908 season. Kansas also went undefeated, but did not make a claim for the national championship.

Although there was no provision for a national championship, major teams played their regular schedules before facing their most difficult matches late in the season. "The real championship contests are ushered in with the month of November," The New York Times reported on September 6, "and on the seventh day of that month the final try-outs will be witnessed." The most eagerly anticipated games were Yale at Princeton (November 14) and Harvard at Yale (November 21). In addition, "intersectional games" were of special interest, with Cornell at Chicago, and Penn at Michigan.

== Rules ==
"With the modernized plays that are being brought into the game," noted one writer, "football is, in its present state, the national game in the fall the same as baseball in the summer.". Rules for the forward pass, which had been legalized only two years earlier, were modified, and passing was still a risky play. "If the ball on the forward pass is touched and then freed, and is touched by another player on the passer's side, it will be given to the opponents at the point where the ball was illegally touched," and it was noted that the rule change was to stop the practice of a passer throwing the ball high "with the hopes that some one of his teammates would get the ball in the general scramble that followed,". In addition, halftime was extended from ten minutes to fifteen

The rules for American football in 1908 were significantly different from whose of a century later, as many of the present rules (100 yard field, four downs to gain ten yards, 6-point touchdown and the 3-point field goal) were not adopted until 1912. The rules in 1908 were:

- Field 110 yards in length
- Kickoff made from midfield
- Three downs to gain ten yards
- Touchdown worth 5 points
- Field goal worth 4 points
- Forward pass legal, but subject to penalties

== Conference and program changes ==
School	1907 Conference	1908 Conference
Drake Bulldogs	Independent	MVIAA
Indiana State Sycamores	Independent	football banned by faculty
Iowa State Cyclones	Independent	MVIAA

== September ==
On September 19, Carlisle had a practice game against its prep school program, Conway Hall. Carlisle played its first college opponent on September 23, with a 39-0 win over Lebanon Valley on Wednesday afternoon. On September 26, in Philadelphia, Pennsylvania defeated West Virginia 6-0 by completing two forward passes to score a touchdown with five minutes left in "oppressively warm" weather in Philadelphia. Carlisle beat Villanova 10-0, Vanderbilt beat Southwestern Presbyterian 11-5, and Brown defeated New Hampshire 34-0.

September 30 In Wednesday afternoon games, Harvard struggled as it opened the season with a 5-0 win over Bowdoin, scoring on a touchdown in the second half. "Harvard tried the forward pass, line plunges and end runs, but showed poor team work," a dispatch from Cambridge noted. Dartmouth defeated Vermont, 11-0, Yale defeated Wesleyan 16-0, Brown beat Bates, 35-4, and Penn defeated Ursinus, 30-0.

== October ==
October 3, Harvard beat Maine 16-0 and Penn defeated Bucknell by the same score. Yale was held to a touchdown by Syracuse, 6-0. Annapolis defeated Rutgers 18-0, and beat St. John's 22-0 the following day, while West Point beat Tufts 5-0. Cornell beat Hamilton College, 11-0. Princeton beat the Springfield Training School, 18-0, to raise its record to 2-0-1. Dartmouth defeated Massachusetts Agricultural, 28-0.

Further west, Carlisle and State University (later referred to as Penn State) met at Wilkes-Barre, PA, with Carlisle winning 12-5. Pittsburgh defeating little Mount Union College (now a Division III school, from Athens, Ohio), 34-4. Michigan beat Case, 16-6. Chicago beat Purdue, 39-0. Wooster College defeated Ohio State 8-0. In the South, Tennessee beat North Carolina, 12-0 and Auburn beat Howard College (not to be confused with Howard University), 18-0. Georgia Tech defeated Gordon College, 32-0.

At the end of the first Saturday in October, seven schools remained unbeaten, untied and unscored upon against college opponents: Harvard and Penn, both at 3-0-0; Yale, Annapolis (Navy) and Cornell, at 2-0-0; the University of Chicago, Auburn, and Tennessee.

October 10 Following a Wednesday (Oct. 7) afternoon win over Villanova (11-0), Penn beat State College (Penn State) 6-0. Harvard defeated Williams, 10-0. Annapolis won 22-0 over Dickinson, and West Point beat Tufts, 33-0. Cornell dropped from the ranks of the unscored upon, but defeated Oberlin, 23-10. Yale beat Holy Cross, 18-0.

Further west, Chicago was scored on in its 29-6 win over Indiana. In Buffalo, Carlisle defeated Syracuse, 12-0. Pittsburgh beat Marietta College 7-0. At East Lansing, Michigan and Michigan State played to a 0-0 tie, and Princeton and Lafayette played a scoreless draw as well. Wisconsin opened its season with a 35-0 win over Lawrence College., In the south, Auburn shut out Georgia's Gordon College 42-0. Tennessee beat Maryville College, 39-5. Vanderbilt defeated visiting Rose Polytechnic (later Rose-Hulman), 32-0. Unbeaten, untied and unscored upon were Harvard, Penn, Yale, Navy, Auburn, and Wisconsin.

In Wednesday afternoon games (October 14), Annapolis won at Maryland, 57-0. Penn stayed unbeaten, but was scored upon for the first time, when Gettysburg College managed a field goal; the final score was 23-4.

October 17 In New Haven, Yale faced West Point in a meeting of unbeatens, and won 6-0. In Philadelphia, Penn (6-0-0) faced Brown (4-0) and won, 12-0. Annapolis beat Lehigh, 16-0, and Harvard beat Springfield Teachers College, 44-0. Pitt defeated cross-town rival Carnegie Tech, 22-0, and Princeton beat Virginia Tech, 10-4. Cornell beat Colgate, 9-0. Carlisle was idle.

Further west, Michigan beat Notre Dame 12-6, and Chicago beat visiting Illinois, 11-6. St. Louis University advanced its record to 4-0-0 with a 24-0 win over visiting Arkansas. In the South, Tennessee defeated Kentucky, 7-0; Auburn won at Mercer, 23-0; Vanderbilt beat Clemson 41-0. Georgia Tech beat Mississippi State, 23-0, and LSU beat Texas A&M, 26-0.

On Wednesday afternoon, October 21, Princeton defeated Fordham, 17-0, to extend its record to 4-0-1.

October 24 saw several big matchups between college football's unbeaten teams. In Philadelphia, Penn (7-0-0) hosted Carlisle (5-0-0), while Harvard and Navy, both unbeaten, untied and unscored upon in five games, met at Annapolis. A crowd of 20,000 turned packed Franklin Field to watch the Penn game, with the Quakers taking an early 6-0 lead. The Indians tied the game in the second half on a touchdown and extra point by Jim Thorpe. Thorpe missed on three field goal tries, and the game ended in a 6-6 tie. In Annapolis, Navy scored a touchdown five minutes into the game, but in the second half, Richardson fumbled and Nourse ran the ball back for a score, and the game ended as a 6-6 tie.

Yale stayed unbeaten, untied, and unscored on against visiting Washington and Jefferson, taking a 21-0 lead in the first half and winning 38-0. Pitt defeated Bucknell, 22-0 Princeton was tied again, in a 0-0 game against visiting Syracuse. Cornell beat Vermont 9-0.

In the West, Michigan won at Ohio State, 10-6, while Chicago was idle. St. Louis University won at Wabash College on a field goal, 4-0. Down south, Tennessee defeated Georgia 10-0, Georgia School of Technology (Georgia Tech) beat Alabama 11-6, Vanderbilt beat Ole Miss 29-0, and in Birmingham, Auburn beat Sewanee 6-0, and LSU beat Rhodes, 55-0

In a Wednesday afternoon game on October 28, Navy handed George Washington University its first loss, 17-0.

October 31 saw the first major intersectional games of the season. The Pittsburgh Panthers and the St. Louis Billikens, both unbeaten at 5-0-0, met at St. Louis, with Pitt winning 13-0. Vanderbilt (5-0-0) traveled to Michigan (3-0-1), with the home team winning 24-6.

Unbeaten and once-tied, Carlisle (5-0-1) and Navy (7-0-1) met at Annapolis, with the Indians handing the Midshipmen their first loss, 16-6, as Mike Balenti kicked four field goals, which at that time were worth 4 points apiece

Yale stayed unscored upon, with a 49-0 win over Massachusetts, with Ted Koy scoring four of the Elis' nine touchdowns. Including 4 points after, the score would have been 58-0 under modern rules. Cornell defeated Penn State 10-4. Pennsylvania beat Carnegie Tech 25-10 in Pittsburgh. Harvard defeated Brown 6-2. At West Point, Princeton and Army played to a 0-0 tie in the snow; Princeton drove to within six yards on three occasions, and Army held each time.

Auburn and Louisiana State, both unbeaten at 4-0-0, met at Auburn, Alabama, and LSU won 10-2. It would prove to be Auburn's only loss of 1908, and LSU's biggest win en route to a 10-0-0 finish. Another meeting of unbeatens happened in Atlanta, as Tennessee and Georgia Tech, both 4-0-0, faced off. Both scored touchdowns, but Tennessee's extra point gave it a 6-5 win. The loss would be the first of three for Tech. Chicago beat Minnesota 29-0.

== November ==
November 7 Yale (6-0-0) hosted a (4-3-0) Brown team and ended up being tied. Brown scored a touchdown early in the game, but missed the point after, and Yale's Ted Koy connected on 30 yard field goal. In the second half, Yale scored a TD and the extra point, to take the lead. Later in the game, Dennie of Brown intercepted Philbin's pass and returned in 40 yards to tie the game, but the point after failed. Under today's rules, Brown would have won 12-10. In 1908, however, a 4-point field goal, and 6 points for a touchdown and conversion, were equal to Brown's two five-point touchdowns. The game ended in a 10-10 tie. Pitt stayed unbeaten with an 11-0 win over visiting West Virginia, and Cornell defeated Amherst, 6-0.

At New York's Polo Grounds, a crowd of 10,000 watched unbeaten Princeton (5-0-3) face Dartmouth (5-0-1). The Princeton Tigers lost in what was considered an upset, 10-6. Harvard and Carlisle, both unbeaten at 6-0-1, met at Cambridge, and the Indians suffered their first loss, 17-0. Penn beat Lafayette, 34-4. Navy beat Villanova 30-6 and Army edged Springfield, 6-5.

In intersectional games, Michigan beat visiting Kentucky, 62-0, while St. Louis hosted Sewanee and the two played to a 6-6 tie. In Indianapolis, Notre Dame defeated Indiana 11-0. In the South, Vanderbilt handed visiting Tennessee its first loss, 16-9. LSU beat visiting Mississippi A&M 50-0, and in Atlanta, Auburn beat Georgia Tech 44-0.

In a game on Wednesday, November 10, LSU defeated Baylor, 89-0

November 14 In a major intersectional game between two unbeaten and untied teams, Cornell (6-0-0) visited Chicago (4-0-0). Playing in a snowstorm, Cornell took the lead before the Maroons, coached by Amos Alonzo Stagg tied the game with five minutes left on a triple pass play, finishing with a 6-6 store. Pennsylvania (9-0-1) visited Michigan (5-0-1) and won 29-0. Ohio State handed visiting Vanderbilt its second loss, 17-6.

The previously unbeaten and untied (6-0-0) Pitt lost to visiting, 6-1-1 Carlisle, falling 6-0. Navy beat Penn State, 5-0 and Army tied Washington & Jefferson, 6-6. Brown beat Vermont 12-0. At Omaha, St. Louis beat Creighton, 6-0. In the South, Tennessee edged Clemson, 6-5; Sewanee won at Georgia Tech 6-0, and Georgia and Alabama played to a 6-6 tie,

Harvard (7-0-1) hosted Dartmouth (6-0-1) and won, 6-0. Yale (6-0-1) visited 5-1-3 Princeton before a crowd of 30,000 and won 11-6. Both Harvard and Yale stayed unbeaten, a week away from their November 21 meeting in New Haven.

November 21 The biggest game of the season was in New Haven, Connecticut, as Harvard (8-0-1) visited Yale (7-0-1). A crowd of 35,000 turned out to watch the Crimson vs. Blue contest, and The New York Times reported on the front page the next day that the game "would have been seen by 75,000 if the Stadium could hold that many, for that number of applications was received," Harvard won 4-0, with Vic Kennard kicking a 25-yard field goal for the win Pitt beat Gettysburg College 6-0.

In intersectional games, Carlisle lost at Minnesota, 11-6, while Michigan suffered its second straight loss, losing at Syracuse, 28-4. In St. Louis, Vanderbilt defeated Washington University 28-0.

Cornell beat visiting Trinity, 18-6. Navy defeated Virginia Polytechnic Institute (Virginia Tech) 15-4. Army beat Villanova 25-0. Unbeaten Chicago faced unbeaten and untied (5-0-0) Wisconsin and won 18-12. St. Louis traveled to Minnesota to face Carleton College and played to a 0-0 tie. Tennessee beat Chattanooga 35-6.

On Thanksgiving Day afternoon (November 28), a crowd of 25,000 turned out in Philadelphia to watch unbeaten Pennsylvania host unbeaten Cornell. Quarterback Albert Miller guided Pennsylvania to a 17-4 win. Though Penn "found the boys from the shores of Lake Cayuga a harder proposition than she looked for", wrote a New York Times reporter, they "closed the season without once drinking from the bitter cup of defeat, and to-night her followers are claiming at least equal rank with Harvard.".

Pitt fell to Penn State, 12-6. Carlisle won at St. Louis, 17-0. Carlisle would play two more games out west, a 37-6 win at Nebraska on December 2, and an 8-4 win at Denver on December 5.

In the South, LSU finished its season unbeaten with a 36-4 win over Arkansas at Little Rock. Vanderbilt and Sewanee played to a 6-6 tie. In Montgomery, Alabama, Auburn beat Georgia, 23-0. Two days later, at their annual game, Army beat Navy, 6-4.

On September 19, 1908, Washington & Jefferson College became the college football first team to wear numbered uniforms. The occasion was a game against Denison University. (Note: The University of Pittsburgh claims the first use of numbered uniforms, citing to a December 5, 1908, game versus Washington & Jefferson. However, the NCAA does not recognize that claim, instead crediting Washington & Jefferson for being the first to wear numbered uniforms in a game several months earlier.)

== Conference standings ==
=== Major conference standings ===
1908 Missouri Valley Conference football standings
	Conf.					Overall
Team	W		L		T	W		L		T
Kansas $	4	–	0	–	0	9	–	0	–	0
Nebraska	2	–	1	–	0	7	–	2	–	1
Iowa State	2	–	1	–	0	6	–	3	–	0
Missouri	3	–	2	–	0	6	–	2	–	0
Drake	1	–	2	–	0	5	–	2	–	0
Washington University	0	–	2	–	0	4	–	4	–	1
Iowa	0	–	4	–	0	2	–	5	–	0
$ – Conference champion

1908 Northwest Conference football standings
	Conf.					Overall
Team	W		L		T	W		L		T
Washington $	3	–	0	–	1	6	–	0	–	1
Washington State	1	–	0	–	2	4	–	0	–	2
Oregon	1	–	2	–	0	5	–	2	–	0
Oregon Agricultural	1	–	2	–	0	4	–	3	–	1
Whitman	1	–	3	–	0	4	–	5	–	0
Idaho	0	–	2	–	1	2	–	2	–	2
$ – Conference champion

1908 Southern Intercollegiate Athletic Association football standings
	Conf.					Overall
Team	W		L		T	W		L		T
LSU +	2	–	0	–	0	10	–	0	–	0
Auburn +	4	–	1	–	0	6	–	1	–	0
Vanderbilt	3	–	0	–	1	7	–	2	–	1
Tennessee	3	–	2	–	0	7	–	2	–	0
Georgia Tech	4	–	3	–	0	6	–	3	–	0
Georgia	2	–	2	–	1	5	–	2	–	1
Alabama	1	–	1	–	1	6	–	1	–	1
Sewanee	1	–	1	–	1	4	–	1	–	3
Mississippi A&M	1	–	3	–	0	3	–	4	–	0
Ole Miss	0	–	2	–	0	3	–	5	–	0
Mercer	0	–	3	–	0	3	–	4	–	0
Howard (AL)	0	–	3	–	0	2	–	4	–	0
Clemson	0	–	4	–	0	1	–	6	–	0
Nashville			–					–
+ – Conference co-champions

1908 Western Conference football standings
	Conf.					Overall
Team	W		L		T	W		L		T
Chicago $	5	–	0	–	0	5	–	0	–	1
Illinois	4	–	1	–	0	5	–	1	–	1
Wisconsin	2	–	1	–	0	5	–	1	–	0
Indiana	1	–	3	–	0	2	–	4	–	0
Purdue	1	–	3	–	0	4	–	3	–	0
Iowa	0	–	1	–	0	2	–	5	–	0
Minnesota	0	–	2	–	0	3	–	2	–	1
Northwestern	0	–	2	–	0	2	–	2	–	0
$ – Conference champion

=== Independents ===
1908 Eastern college football independents records
	Conf.			Overall
Team	W	L	T	W		L		T
Penn		–		11	–	0	–	1
Harvard		–		9	–	0	–	1
Cornell		–		7	–	1	–	1
Fordham		–		5	–	1	–	0
Yale		–		7	–	1	–	1
Dartmouth		–		6	–	1	–	1
Carlisle		–		10	–	2	–	1
Washington & Jefferson		–		10	–	2	–	1
Army		–		6	–	1	–	2
Pittsburgh		–		8	–	3	–	0
Lafayette		–		6	–	2	–	2
Princeton		–		5	–	2	–	3
Syracuse		–		6	–	3	–	1
Brown		–		5	–	3	–	1
Temple		–		3	–	2	–	1
Colgate		–		4	–	3	–	0
Lehigh		–		4	–	3	–	0
Dickinson		–		5	–	4	–	0
Amherst		–		3	–	3	–	2
Holy Cross		–		4	–	4	–	0
Penn State		–		5	–	5	–	0
Vermont		–		3	–	3	–	3
Wesleyan		–		3	–	4	–	2
Springfield Training School		–		3	–	4	–	1
NYU		–		2	–	3	–	2
Franklin & Marshall		–		4	–	6	–	1
Bucknell		–		3	–	5	–	2
Rutgers		–		3	–	5	–	1
Boston College		–		2	–	4	–	2
Carnegie Tech		–		3	–	7	–	0
Geneva		–		1	–	6	–	2
Tufts		–		1	–	6	–	1
Villanova		–		1	–	6	–	0
New Hampshire		–		1	–	7	–	0
Drexel		–		0	–	7	–	0

1908 Midwestern college football independents records
	Conf.			Overall
Team	W	L	T	W		L		T
Kirksville Normal		–		8	–	0	–	0
Miami (OH)		–		7	–	0	–	0
Iowa State Normal		–		5	–	0	–	0
Lincoln (MO)		–		2	–	0	–	0
DePaul		–		7	–	0	–	1
St. Mary's (OH)		–		7	–	0	–	1
Butler		–		5	–	0	–	1
Ohio Northern		–		9	–	1	–	0
Fairmount		–		8	–	1	–	0
Notre Dame		–		8	–	1	–	0
Michigan Agricultural		–		6	–	0	–	2
Lake Forest		–		4	–	1	–	1
Saint Louis		–		6	–	2	–	2
Kansas State		–		6	–	2	–	0
Michigan		–		5	–	2	–	1
Marquette		–		4	–	2	–	1
St. Viator		–		5	–	3	–	0
Central Michigan		–		4	–	3	–	0
Mount Union		–		5	–	4	–	1
Doane		–		4	–	4	–	0
South Dakota State		–		3	–	3	–	1
Buchtel		–		3	–	4	–	0
Western State Normal		–		3	–	4	–	0
Western Illinois		–		2	–	3	–	1
Carthage		–		2	–	3	–	0
Haskell		–		3	–	5	–	1
Wittenberg		–		3	–	5	–	1
Ohio		–		3	–	5	–	0
North Dakota Agricultural		–		2	–	3	–	0
Cincinnati		–		1	–	4	–	1
Wabash		–		2	–	6	–	0
Northern Illinois State		–		1	–	5	–	1
Michigan State Normal		–		1	–	4	–	0
Heidelberg		–		1	–	6	–	0
Franklin		–		0	–	9	–	1
Baldwin–Wallace		–		0	–	2	–	0
Chicago P&S		–		0	–	4	–	0

1908 Southern college football independents records
	Conf.			Overall
Team	W	L	T	W		L		T
Southwestern Louisiana Industrial		–		6	–	0	–	0
Virginia		–		7	–	0	–	1
Rollins		–		4	–	0	–	1
George Washington		–		8	–	1	–	1
Oklahoma		–		8	–	1	–	1
Tulane		–		7	–	1	–	0
North Carolina A&M		–		6	–	1	–	0
The Citadel		–		4	–	1	–	1
Navy		–		9	–	2	–	1
Florida		–		5	–	2	–	1
TCU		–		6	–	3	–	0
VMI		–		4	–	2	–	0
Davidson		–		5	–	3	–	1
Baylor		–		5	–	3	–	0
West Virginia		–		5	–	3	–	0
Kentucky State		–		4	–	3	–	0
Louisiana Industrial		–		4	–	3	–	1
Arkansas		–		5	–	4	–	0
Texas		–		5	–	4	–	0
VPI		–		5	–	4	–	0
Arkansas State Normal		–		3	–	3	–	0
Chattanooga		–		4	–	4	–	0
North Carolina		–		3	–	3	–	3
Oklahoma A&M		–		4	–	4	–	0
Delaware		–		3	–	4	–	1
Kendall		–		2	–	3	–	0
South Carolina		–		3	–	5	–	1
Texas A&M		–		3	–	5	–	0
Georgetown		–		2	–	4	–	1
Howard (AL)		–		2	–	4	–	0
Maryland		–		3	–	8	–	0
Birmingham		–		0	–	3	–	3
Stetson		–		0	–	1	–	1
Wake Forest		–		1	–	4	–	0
Goldey College		–		0	–	2	–	1
Mississippi College		–		0	–	1	–	0
Southwest Texas State		–		0	–	2	–	0
Marshall		–		0	–	6	–	0

1908 Western college football independents records
	Conf.			Overall
Team	W	L	T	W		L		T
Arizona		–		5	–	0	–	0
New Mexico		–		5	–	1	–	0
Montana Agricultural		–		3	–	1	–	2
USC		–		3	–	1	–	1
New Mexico A&M		–		4	–	2	–	0
Utah Agricultural		–		4	–	2	–	0
Utah		–		4	–	2	–	1
Montana		–		1	–	3	–	1
Wyoming		–		1	–	2	–	0

=== Minor conferences ===
Conference	Champion(s)	Record
Kansas Collegiate Athletic Conference	Fairmount	5–0
Michigan Intercollegiate Athletic Association	Albion	3–0–2
Ohio Athletic Conference	Western Reserve	6–1

=== Minor conference standings ===
1908 Colorado Football Association standings
	Conf.					Overall
Team	W		L		T	W		L		T
Denver $	4	–	0	–	0	7	–	1	–	0
Colorado	3	–	1	–	0	5	–	2	–	0
Colorado College	2	–	1	–	0	6	–	1	–	0
Colorado Agricultural	0	–	2	–	0	1	–	3	–	0
Colorado Mines	0	–	3	–	0	2	–	3	–	0
$ – Conference champion

1908 Eastern Virginia Intercollegiate Athletic Association football standings
	Conf.					Overall
Team	W		L		T	W		L		T
Randolph–Macon +	2	–	1	–	0	6	–	2	–	0
Hampden–Sydney +	2	–	1	–	0	5	–	4	–	0
William & Mary	1	–	2	–	0	4	–	6	–	1
Richmond	1	–	2	–	0	3	–	5	–	0
+ – Conference co-champions

1908 Ohio Athletic Conference football standings
	Conf.					Overall
Team	W		L		T	W		L		T
Western Reserve $	6	–	1	–	0	9	–	1	–	0
Kenyon	3	–	1	–	1	7	–	1	–	1
Ohio State	4	–	3	–	0	6	–	4	–	0
Case	4	–	2	–	1	6	–	3	–	1
Oberlin	2	–	2	–	0	3	–	4	–	0
Denison	2	–	3	–	0	5	–	5	–	0
Ohio Wesleyan	2	–	3	–	0	4	–	4	–	0
Wooster	1	–	5	–	0	3	–	5	–	0
Heidelberg	0	–	4	–	0	1	–	6	–	0
$ – Conference champion

== Awards and honors ==
=== All-Americans ===
The consensus All-America team included:

Position	Name	Height	Weight (lbs.)	Class	Hometown	Team
QB	Walter Steffen	5'9"	158	Sr.	Chicago, Illinois	Chicago
QB	Ed Lange			Sr.		Navy
HB	Hamilton Corbett			So.	Portland, Oregon	Harvard
HB	Bill Hollenback	6'2"	184	Sr.	Blue Bell, Pennsylvania	Penn
HB	Frederick Tibbott			Sr.	Indianapolis, Indiana	Princeton
FB	Ted Coy	6'0"	195	Jr.	Andover, Massachusetts	Yale
E	Hunter Scarlett	5'10"	168	Sr.	Erie, Pennsylvania	Penn
T	Hamilton Fish	6'4"	200	Jr.	Southboro, Massachusetts	Harvard
T	Percy Northcroft			Sr.		Navy
G	Hamlin Andrus			Jr.	Yonkers, New York	Yale
G	Bernard O'Rourke			Jr.	Syracuse, New York	Cornell
C	Charles Nourse	6'0"	197	Jr.	Concord, New Hampshire	Harvard
G	William Goebel			Jr.	Cincinnati, Ohio	Yale
G	Clark Tobin			So.	South Boston, Massachusetts	Dartmouth
T	Bill Horr			Sr.	Munnsville, New York	Syracuse
E	George Schildmiller			Sr.	Brattleboro, Vermont	Dartmouth

== Statistical leaders ==
- Player scoring most points: Doc Fenton, LSU, 132
- Total offense leader, Jim Thorpe, Carlisle, 993
