= Sugar Ridge =

Sugar Ridge can refer to:

- Sugar Ridge Township, Clay County, Indiana
- Sugar Ridge, Ohio
