= Wood Old Homestead =

Historic house in Ohio, United States

- U.S. National Register of Historic Places
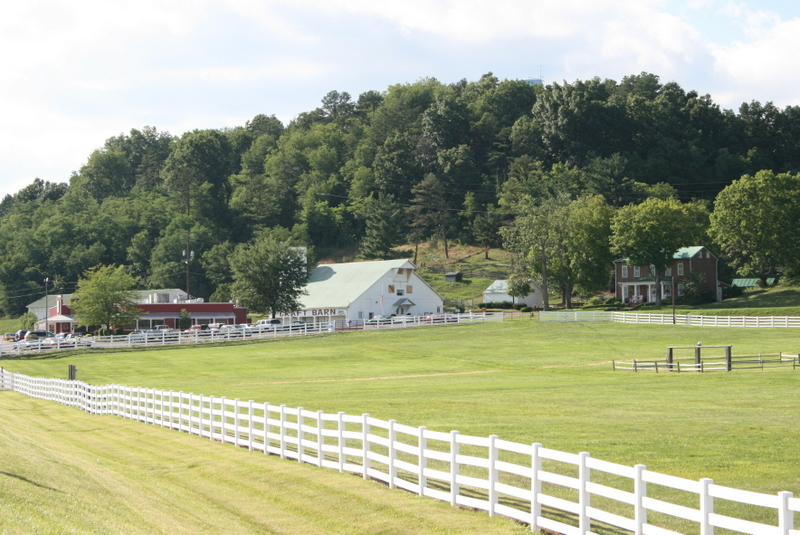
- Fields and buildings at the farm

- Location within Ohio Location within the United States
- Location: Raccoon Township, Gallia County, at 791 Farmview Road, Bidwell, Ohio
- Nearest city: Rio Grande, Ohio
- Coordinates: 38°52′57″N 82°22′3″W
- Area: less than one acre
- Built: 1820
- Architectural style: Federal
- NRHP reference No.: 87002144
- Added to NRHP: December 14, 1987

Wood Old Homestead, also known as Bob Evans Farm, is a farm in Bidwell, Ohio, near the city of Rio Grande, where American restauranteur Bob Evans and his wife Jewell lived for nearly 20 years, raising their six children. The large brick farmhouse was formerly a stagecoach stop and an inn, and now serves as a company museum. It features exhibits about Bob Evans Restaurants, the Homestead, and local history. There is a reconstruction of the original steakhouse, company television commercials, and life-size dioramas and memorabilia of the Evans family. The farm is currently owned by Golden Gate Capital, which acquired the farm as part of its 2017 purchase of the Bob Evans Restaurant division from Bob Evans Farms, Inc.

The farm also features the Adamsville Village, a 19th-century log cabin village, trails, and opportunities for camping, horseback riding, canoeing and special events. The farm is still a working farm. There is an annual Bob Evans Farm Festival. The Bob Evans Restaurant on the farm is open year-round.
