= Alfred W. Place =

American football player and coach, minister, and missionary

Biographical details
- Born: May 8, 1877; Rudolph, Ohio, U.S.
- Died: September 19, 1955 (aged 78); Indianapolis, Indiana, U.S.

Playing career

Football
- 1899–1900: Chicago
- Positions: End, halfback

Coaching career (HC unless noted)

Football
- 1903: Buchtel

Baseball
- 1904: Buchtel

Head coaching record
- Overall: 0–2 (football)

Alfred William Place (May 8, 1877 – September 19, 1955) was an American college football and college baseball player and coach, minister, and missionary. He was the sixth head football coach at Buchtel College—now known as the University of Akron—helming the team for one season, in 1903, and compiling a record of 0–2.

Place was born on Rudolph, Ohio, and was raised in Bowling Green, Ohio. He graduated from Bethany College in Bethany, West Virginia before moving on to the University of Chicago as a divinity student. At Chicago, Place played football as a halfback. There, in 1900, he also set a record for physical strength, breaking a mark set by Walter S. Kennedy.

Place also coached baseball at Buchtel in the spring of 1904. At that time, he was the pastor at the Fourth Church of Christ in Akron, Ohio. He left that position in May 1904 to become the pastor of the Christian church in Bellevue, Pennsylvania. Place was a missionary in Japan from 1907 to 1913. He died on September 19, 1955, at Methodist Hospital in Indianapolis, from injuries he sustained while blasting tree stumps on his farm near Mooresville, Indiana.

== Head coaching record ==
=== Football ===
Year	Team	Overall	Conference	Standing	Bowl/playoffs
Buchtel (Independent) (1903)
1903	Buchtel	0–2			
Buchtel:		0–2			
Total:		0–2			
