= Bowling Green City School District =

School district in Ohio

Bowling Green Public Schools Bowling Green City School District
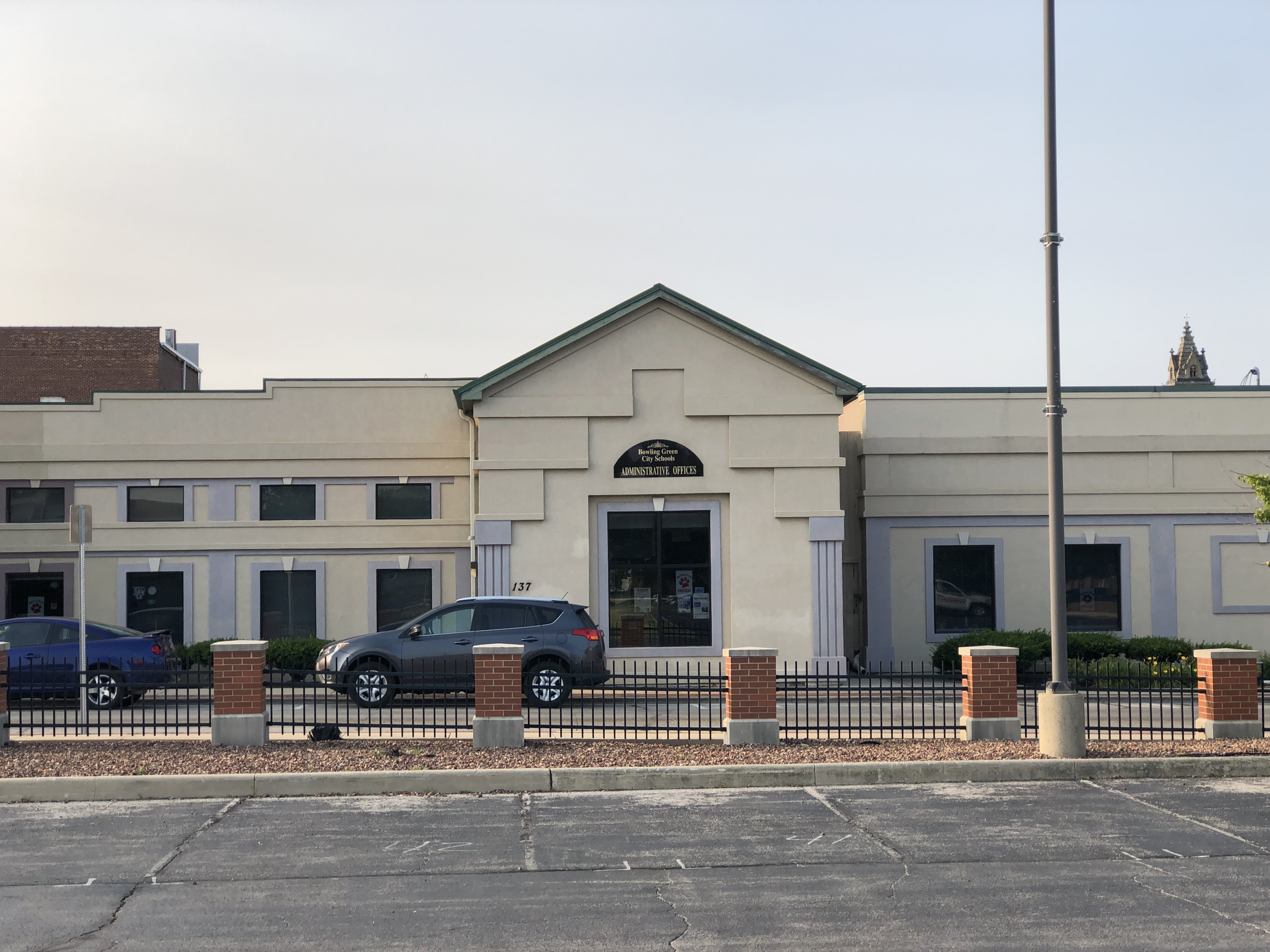

Location
- Bowling Green, Ohio; United States

District information
- Type: Public School District

Students and staff
- Students: Grades PK-12

Other information
- Website: https://www.bgcs.k12.oh.us/

Bowling Green City Schools is a school district in northwest Ohio. The school district serves students who live in the city of Bowling Green located in Wood County including the villages of Portage, Rudolph, Sugar Ridge, Milton Center and Custar.

It is the second largest school district in Wood County, after Perrysburg Exempted Village School District.

== History ==
Dr. Ann McVey took over as Superintendent in January 2011, replacing Hugh Caumartin who retired in December 2010 after 13½ years as Superintendent. In 2009, Bowling Green Middle School opened for students in grades 7 and 8. The former Junior High that once stood on W. Wooster Street was demolished in 2012 and is now used as the Wooster Green.

In Fall of 2019 the Bowling Green Middle School began using virtual reality headsets to teach history classes.

== Grades 9–12 ==
- Bowling Green High School

== Grades 6–8 ==
- Bowling Green Middle School

== Grades K–5 ==
- Conneaut Elementary
- Crim Elementary
- Kenwood Elementary School

=== Kenwood Elementary School ===
Kenwood Elementary
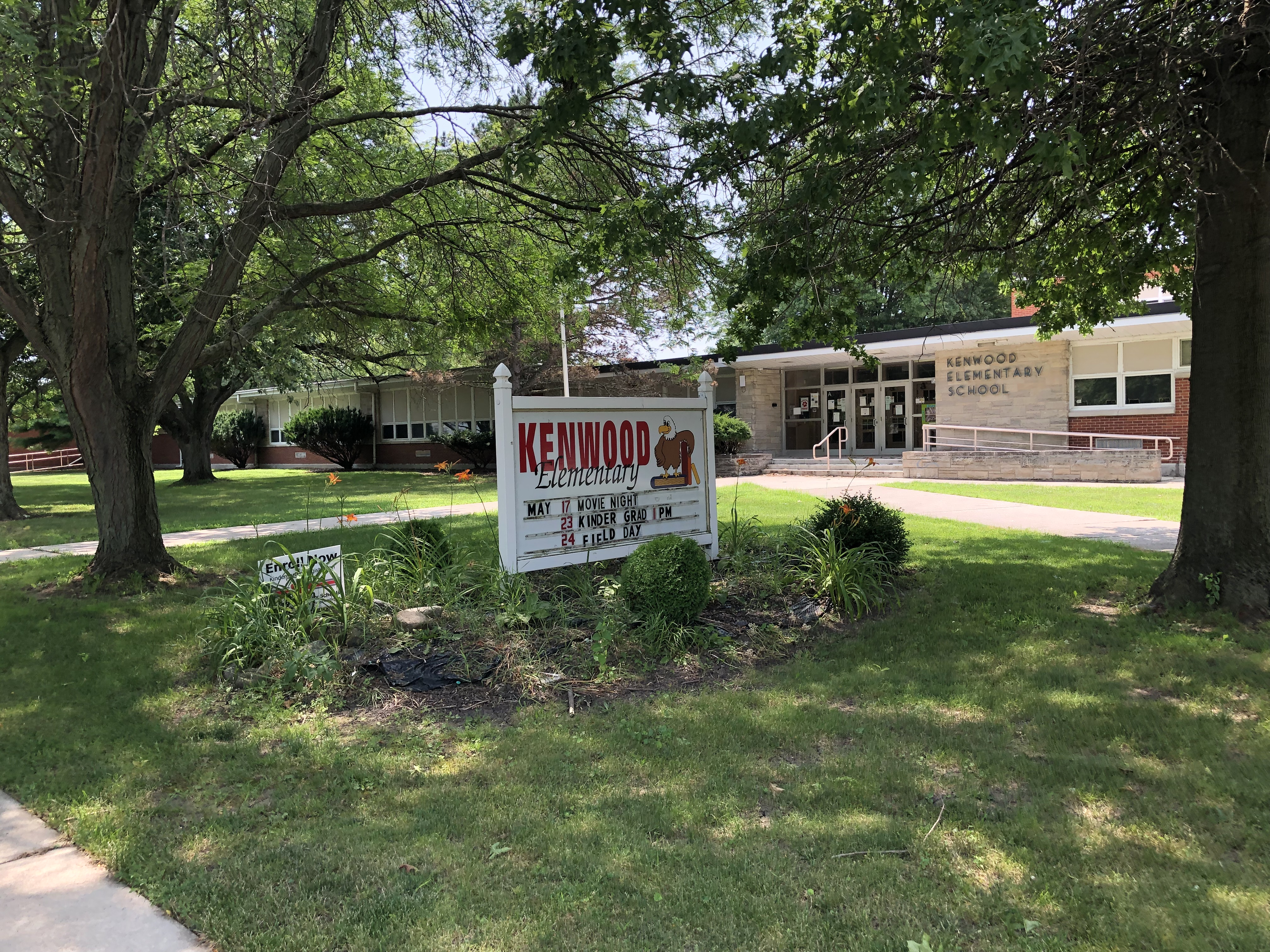

Location
- 710 Kenwood Ave. Bowling Green, Ohio 43402; United States
- Coordinates: 41°21′54″N 83°39′09″W

Information
- School type: public, Elementary school
- Status: Open
- School district: Bowling Green City School District
- Principal: Kathleen Daney
- Grades: K—6
- Gender: co-ed
- Enrollment: 490
- Average class size: 22
- Website: School Website

Kenwood Elementary has 490 students as of 2014.

==== History ====
On April 9, 2013, which was Arbor Day, the fifth grade students at the school were involved in helping with the maintenance of existing trees in Bowling Green. At the end, a sugar maple tree was planted on the south side of the school.

On November 8, 2013, Kenwood Elementary received a call from Bowling Green Police Division at 11:45 a.m. and was locked down. Nobody was injured during the incident.

==== Notable alumni ====
- Bob Latta – Member of the U.S. House of Representatives

== Grade(s) PK ==
- Bowling Green Preschool
