= Milton Center, Ohio =

- Village
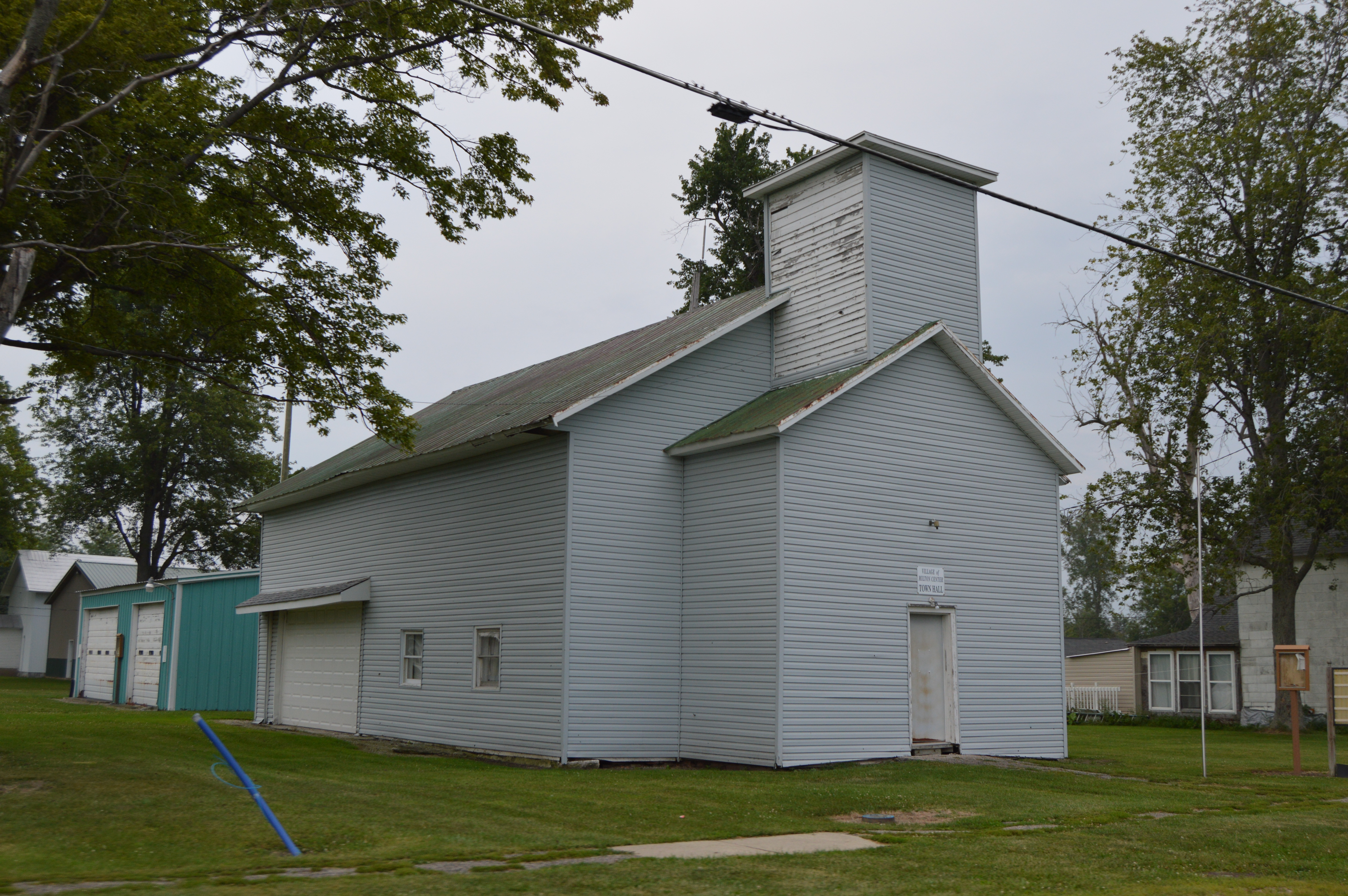
- Village hall on Defiance Street

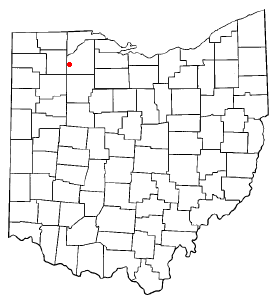
- Location of Milton Center, Ohio

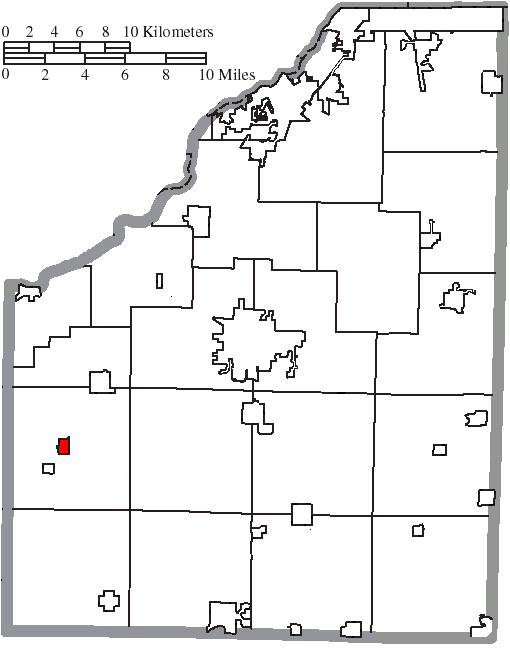
- Location of Milton Center in Wood County
- Coordinates: 41°18′03″N 83°49′47″W
- Country: United States
- State: Ohio
- County: Wood
- Township: Milton

Government
  - Type: Village Council

Area
  - Total: 0.40 sq mi (1.03 km^{2})
  - Land: 0.40 sq mi (1.03 km^{2})
  - Water: 0 sq mi (0.00 km^{2})
- Elevation: 689 ft (210 m)

Population (2020)
  - Total: 137
  - Density: 344.2/sq mi (132.91/km^{2})
- Time zone: UTC-5 (Eastern (EST))
  - Summer (DST): UTC-4 (EDT)
- ZIP code: 43541
- Area code: 419
- FIPS code: 39-50708
- GNIS feature ID: 2399367

Milton Center is a village in Wood County, Ohio, United States. The population was 137 at the 2020 census.

== History ==
Milton Center was platted in 1857. The village took its name from Milton Township. A post office called Milton Centre was established in 1861, and the name was changed to Milton Center in 1893. The village was incorporated in 1869.

== Geography ==
According to the United States Census Bureau, the village has a total area of 0.40 square miles (1.04 km^{2}), all land.

== Demographics ==
Historical population
Census	Pop.	Note	%±
1880	106		—
1890	334		215.1%
1900	325		−2.7%
1910	350		7.7%
1920	194		−44.6%
1930	188		−3.1%
1940	226		20.2%
1950	201		−11.1%
1960	251		24.9%
1970	244		−2.8%
1980	181		−25.8%
1990	200		10.5%
2000	195		−2.5%
2010	144		−26.2%
2020	137		−4.9%
U.S. Decennial Census

=== 2010 census ===
As of the census of 2010, there were 144 people, 53 households, and 37 families living in the village. The population density was 360.0 inhabitants per square mile (139.0/km^{2}). There were 65 housing units at an average density of 162.5 per square mile (62.7/km^{2}). The racial makeup of the village was 91.7% White, 0.7% Native American, 5.6% from other races, and 2.1% from two or more races. Hispanic or Latino of any race were 22.9% of the population.

There were 53 households, of which 34.0% had children under the age of 18 living with them, 50.9% were married couples living together, 15.1% had a female householder with no husband present, 3.8% had a male householder with no wife present, and 30.2% were non-families. 26.4% of all households were made up of individuals, and 11.4% had someone living alone who was 65 years of age or older. The average household size was 2.72 and the average family size was 3.35.

The median age in the village was 36.5 years. 31.2% of residents were under the age of 18; 4.2% were between the ages of 18 and 24; 20.9% were from 25 to 44; 27.2% were from 45 to 64; and 16.7% were 65 years of age or older. The gender makeup of the village was 46.5% male and 53.5% female.

=== 2000 census ===
As of the census of 2000, there were 195 people, 67 households, and 47 families living in the village. The population density was 488.3 inhabitants per square mile (188.5/km^{2}). There were 73 housing units at an average density of 182.8 per square mile (70.6/km^{2}). The racial makeup of the village was 90.26% White, 3.08% Native American, 5.13% from other races, and 1.54% from two or more races. Hispanic or Latino of any race were 17.44% of the population.

There were 67 households, out of which 31.3% had children under the age of 18 living with them, 55.2% were married couples living together, 13.4% had a female householder with no husband present, and 28.4% were non-families. 19.4% of all households were made up of individuals, and 6.0% had someone living alone who was 65 years of age or older. The average household size was 2.91 and the average family size was 3.27.

In the village, the population was spread out, with 26.2% under the age of 18, 12.8% from 18 to 24, 32.8% from 25 to 44, 17.4% from 45 to 64, and 10.8% who were 65 years of age or older. The median age was 35 years. For every 100 females there were 99.0 males. For every 100 females age 18 and over, there were 108.7 males.

The median income for a household in the village was $31,563, and the median income for a family was $42,083. Males had a median income of $30,417 versus $25,000 for females. The per capita income for the village was $13,513. About 6.4% of families and 9.7% of the population were below the poverty line, including 4.2% of those under the age of eighteen and none of those 65 or over.

== Education ==
It is in the Bowling Green City School District.
