= Portage, Ohio =

- Village
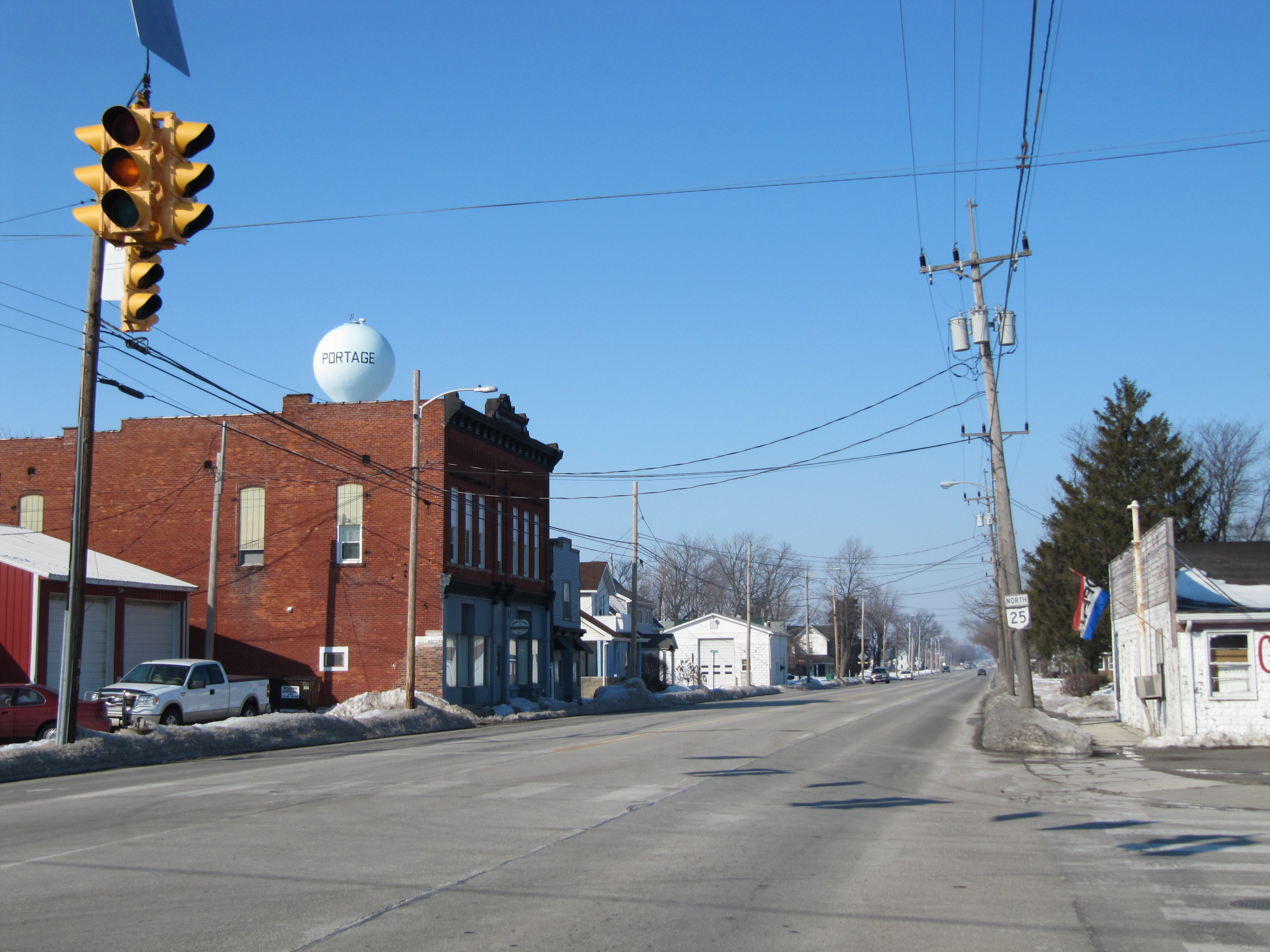
- Portage, Ohio is bisected by State Route 25, sometimes known as South Dixie Highway.

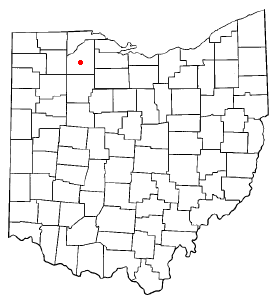
- Location of Portage, Ohio

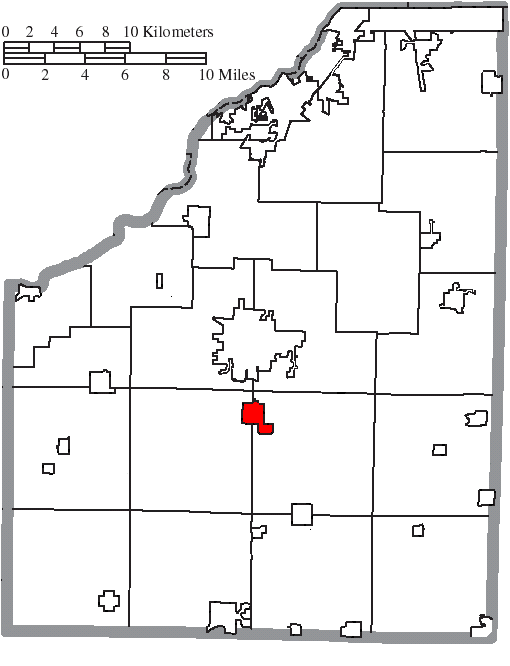
- Location of Portage in Wood County
- Coordinates: 41°19′24″N 83°38′48″W
- Country: United States
- State: Ohio
- County: Wood

Government
  - Mayor: William Mark Wolford

Area
  - Total: 1.48 sq mi (3.84 km^{2})
  - Land: 1.49 sq mi (3.85 km^{2})
  - Water: 0 sq mi (0.00 km^{2})
- Elevation: 679 ft (207 m)

Population (2020)
  - Total: 398
  - Density: 267.5/sq mi (103.28/km^{2})
- Time zone: UTC-5 (Eastern (EST))
  - Summer (DST): UTC-4 (EDT)
- ZIP code: 43451
- Area code: 419
- FIPS code: 39-64108
- GNIS feature ID: 2399008
- Website: https://www.voportage.org/

Portage is a village in Wood County, Ohio, United States. The population was 398 at the 2020 census.

== History ==
Portage was platted in 1836. The village takes its name from the nearby Portage River. A post office called Portage has been in operation since 1829. Portage was incorporated as a village in 1857.

== Geography ==
According to the United States Census Bureau, the village has a total area of 1.49 square miles (3.86 km^{2}), all land.

Portage is connected to Bowling Green and North Baltimore by the Slippery Elm Trail.

== Demographics ==
Historical population
Census	Pop.	Note	%±
1880	304		—
1890	438		44.1%
1900	546		24.7%
1910	450		−17.6%
1920	408		−9.3%
1930	432		5.9%
1940	408		−5.6%
1950	437		7.1%
1960	420		−3.9%
1970	494		17.6%
1980	479		−3.0%
1990	469		−2.1%
2000	428		−8.7%
2010	438		2.3%
2020	398		−9.1%
U.S. Decennial Census

=== 2010 census ===
As of the census of 2010, there were 438 people, 164 households, and 105 families living in the village. The population density was 294.0 inhabitants per square mile (113.5/km^{2}). There were 174 housing units at an average density of 116.8 per square mile (45.1/km^{2}). The racial makeup of the village was 94.1% White, 1.4% African American, 0.5% Native American, 0.5% Pacific Islander, 3.0% from other races, and 0.7% from two or more races. Hispanic or Latino of any race were 7.8% of the population.

There were 164 households, of which 30.5% had children under the age of 18 living with them, 51.2% were married couples living together, 8.5% had a female householder with no husband present, 4.3% had a male householder with no wife present, and 36.0% were non-families. 27.4% of all households were made up of individuals, and 7.9% had someone living alone who was 65 years of age or older. The average household size was 2.50 and the average family size was 3.06.

The median age in the village was 38 years. 20.5% of residents were under the age of 18; 9.7% were between the ages of 18 and 24; 27.9% were from 25 to 44; 33.1% were from 45 to 64; and 8.9% were 65 years of age or older. The gender makeup of the village was 49.8% male and 50.2% female.

=== 2000 census ===
As of the census of 2000, there were 428 people, 153 households, and 108 families living in the village. The population density was 286.0 inhabitants per square mile (110.4/km^{2}). There were 166 housing units at an average density of 110.9 per square mile (42.8/km^{2}). The racial makeup of the village was 91.59% White, 1.17% African American, 0.70% Native American, 3.74% from other races, and 2.80% from two or more races. Hispanic or Latino of any race were 9.81% of the population.

There were 153 households, out of which 35.3% had children under the age of 18 living with them, 62.1% were married couples living together, 7.2% had a female householder with no husband present, and 28.8% were non-families. 22.9% of all households were made up of individuals, and 7.2% had someone living alone who was 65 years of age or older. The average household size was 2.63 and the average family size was 3.12.

In the village, the population was spread out, with 25.9% under the age of 18, 8.2% from 18 to 24, 34.1% from 25 to 44, 22.4% from 45 to 64, and 9.3% who were 65 years of age or older. The median age was 38 years. For every 100 females there were 106.8 males. For every 100 females age 18 and over, there were 105.8 males.

The median income for a household in the village was $37,031, and the median income for a family was $43,125. Males had a median income of $35,227 versus $22,321 for females. The per capita income for the village was $15,698. About 3.9% of families and 10.4% of the population were below the poverty line, including 5.5% of those under age 18 and none of those age 65 or over.

== Education ==
It is in the Bowling Green City School District.

== Notable people ==
- Dan Abbott, baseball player
- Herman Keiser, a professional golfer
- Darwin Phelps, a Republican member of the U.S. House of Representatives from Pennsylvania
- Don Carlos Seitz, a newspaper manager
