= Richfield Township, Henry County, Ohio =

Township in Ohio, US

- Township
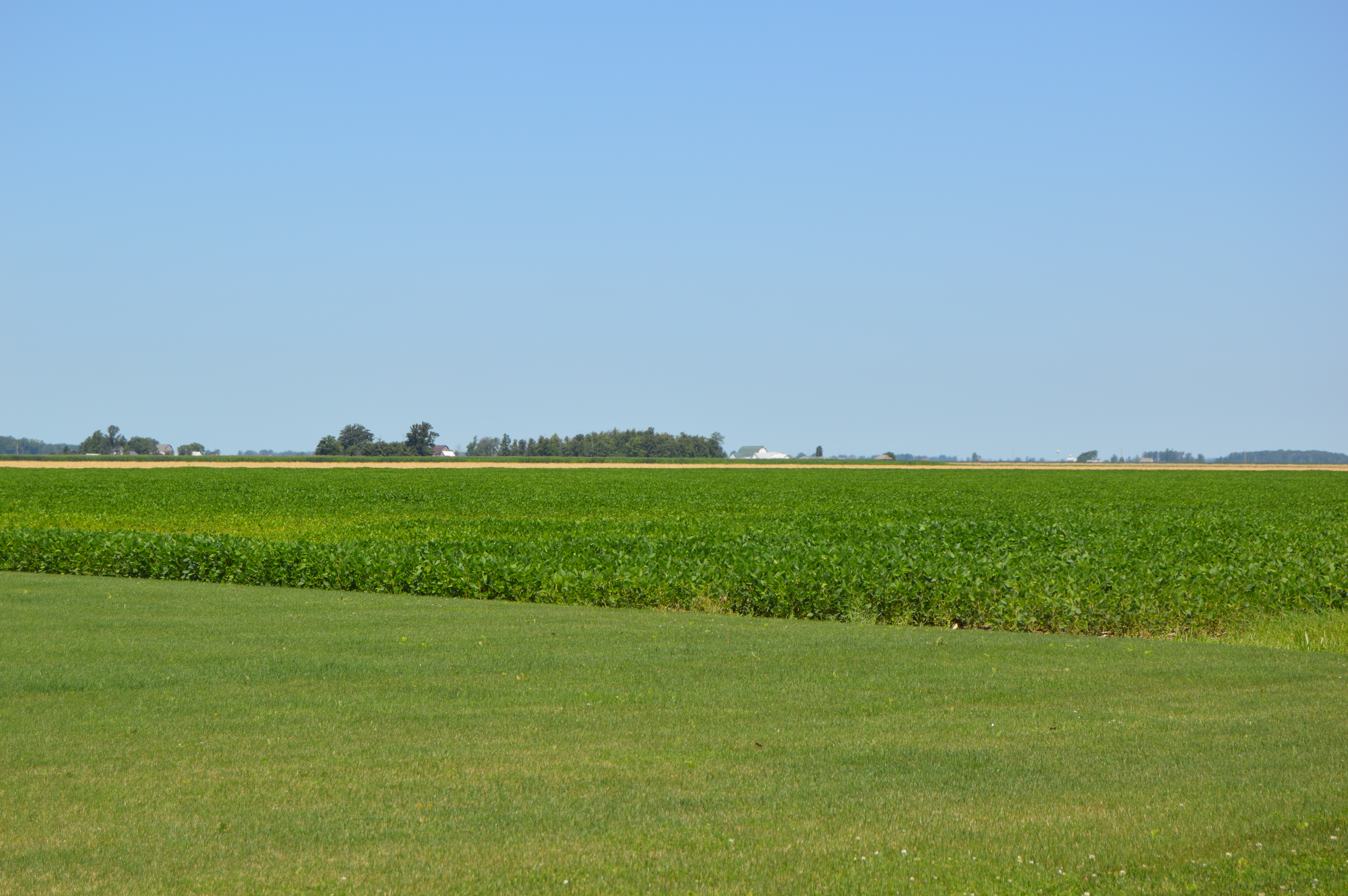
- Soybean field on SR 65

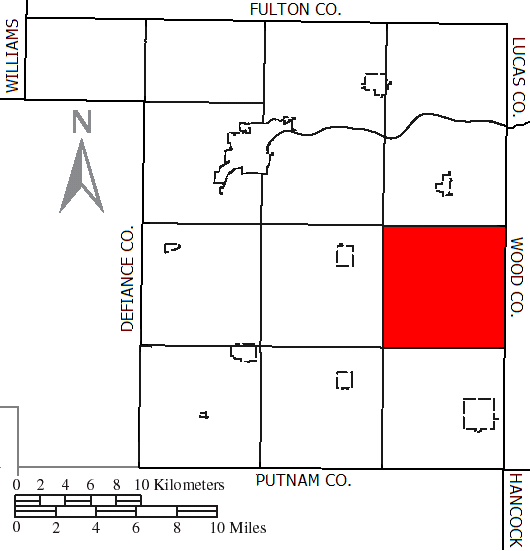
- Location of Richfield Township in Henry County
- Coordinates: 41°18′20″N 83°55′36″W
- Country: United States
- State: Ohio
- County: Henry

Area
  - Total: 36.5 sq mi (94.5 km^{2})
  - Land: 36.5 sq mi (94.5 km^{2})
  - Water: 0 sq mi (0.0 km^{2})
- Elevation: 686 ft (209 m)

Population (2020)
  - Total: 635
  - Density: 17.4/sq mi (6.72/km^{2})
- Time zone: UTC-5 (Eastern (EST))
  - Summer (DST): UTC-4 (EDT)
- FIPS code: 39-66502
- GNIS feature ID: 1086296

Richfield Township is one of the thirteen townships of Henry County, Ohio, United States. As of the 2020 census the population was 635.

== Geography ==
Located in the eastern part of the county, it borders the following townships:

- Damascus Township – north
- Weston Township, Wood County – northeast corner
- Milton Township, Wood County – east
- Jackson Township, Wood County – southeast corner
- Bartlow Township – south
- Marion Township – southwest corner
- Monroe Township – west
- Harrison Township – northwest corner

No municipalities are located in Richfield Township, although the unincorporated community of Grelton lies on its border with Monroe Township.

== Name and history ==
Statewide, other Richfield Townships are located in Lucas and Summit counties.

== Government ==
The township is governed by a three-member board of trustees, who are elected in November of odd-numbered years to a four-year term beginning on the following January 1. Two are elected in the year after the presidential election and one is elected in the year before it. There is also an elected township fiscal officer, who serves a four-year term beginning on April 1 of the year after the election, which is held in November of the year before the presidential election. Vacancies in the fiscal officership or on the board of trustees are filled by the remaining trustees.
