= Slippery Elm Trail =

Rail trail in Wood County, Ohio, United States

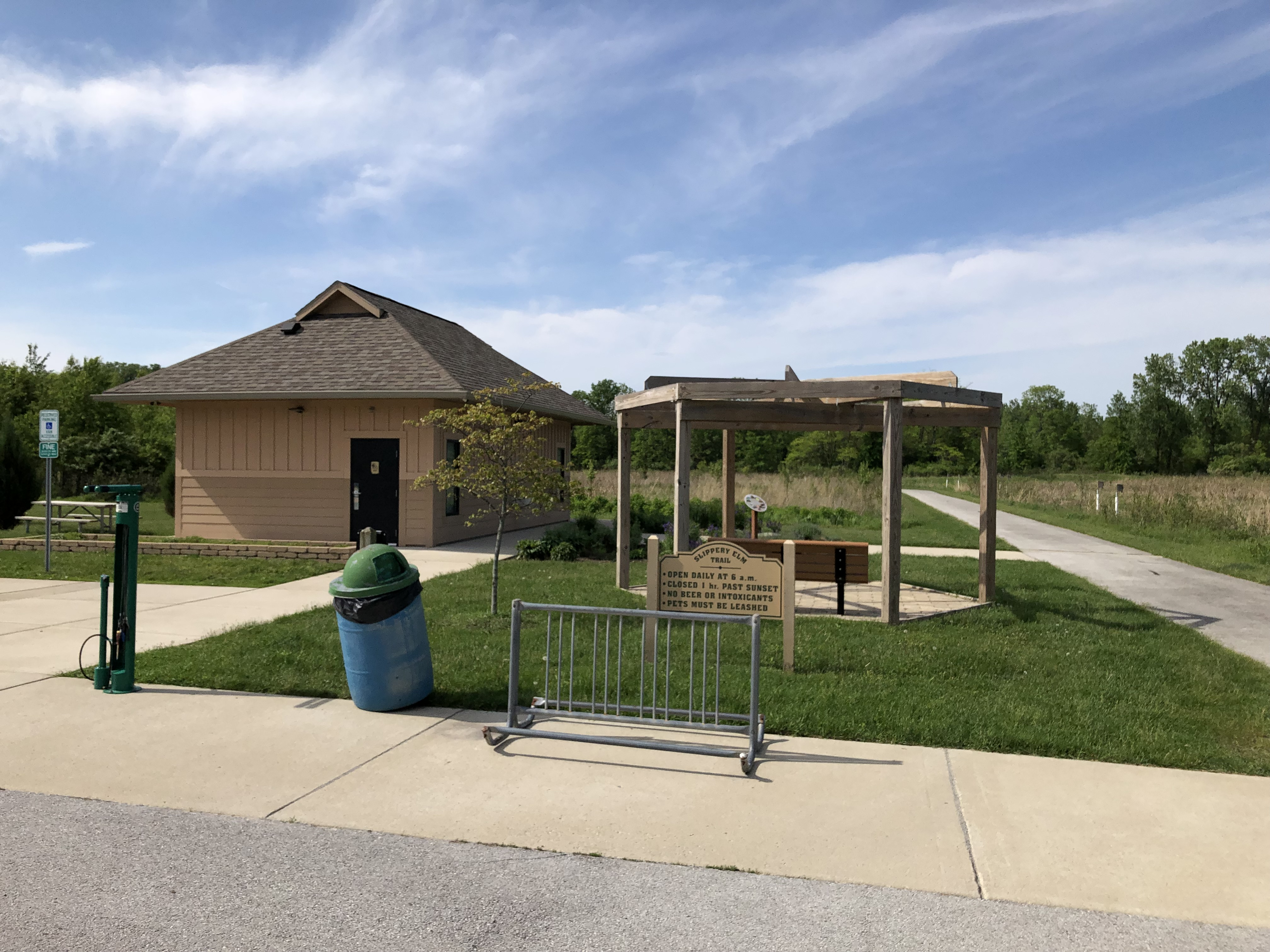

Rails to Trails
- Length: 13 miles
- Location: Bowling Green, Wood County, Ohio
- Established: 1995
- Trailheads: Bowling Green, Portage, Rudolph, North Baltimore
- Use: hiking, bicycling and in-line skating
- Grade: flat railroad grades
- Difficulty: Wheelchair accessible
- Months: 12
- Sights: Rudolph Savanna, Cricket Frog Cove, Black Swamp Preserve
- Surface: Paved
- Right of way: Baltimore & Ohio
- Website: Wood County Park District: Slippery Elm Trail

The Slippery Elm Trail is a rail to trail conversion in Wood County, Ohio that runs 13 miles from Bowling Green, through Portage and Rudolph, to North Baltimore, Ohio.

== History ==
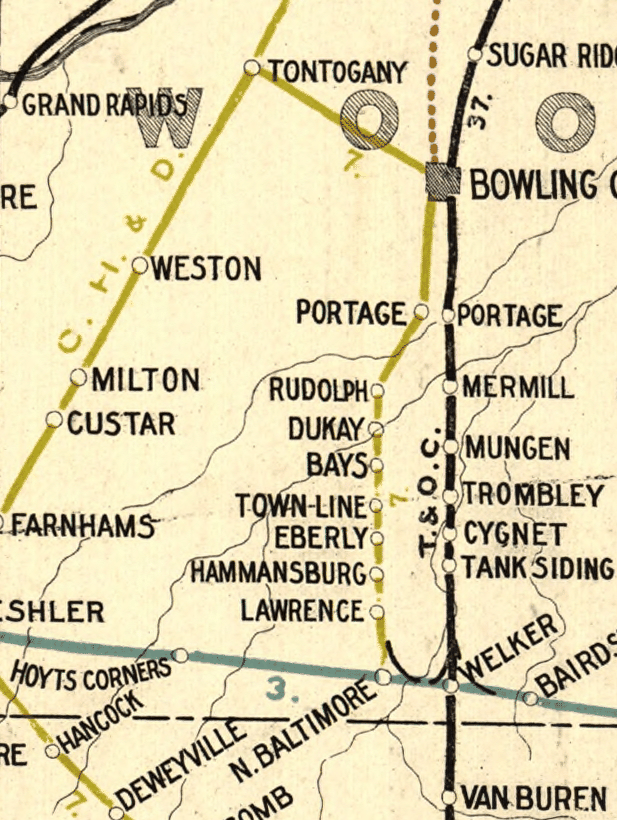
Excerpt from 1898 Ohio railroad map

The Bowling Green Railroad Company was founded in 1874. It functioned as a spur line to link Bowling Green to the Cincinnati, Hamilton, and Dayton Railway (C.H. & D.) that ran northwest of Bowling Green, through Tontogany, Ohio. In 1887, the CH&D railroad purchased enough stock to control the Bowling Green line. In 1890, the Bowling Green Railroad Company absorbed the portion of railroad that makes today's trail, which was then called the Toledo, Findlay and Springfield Railroad. The line was later purchased by the Baltimore and Ohio Railroad in 1917, and operated as B&O until 1978.

The Wood County Parks District opened the rail trail in 1995.

== Location ==
The trail is maintained by the Wood County Parks District, and the routing is per the following table:

Crossing	Mileage		Notes	Coordinates
Crossing	(mi)	(km)	Notes	Coordinates
Montessori School, Bowling Green, Ohio	0	0	Parking, non-school hours only. Northern terminus	41°22′00″N 83°39′25″W
Black Swamp Preserve	0.5	0.80	Bathrooms and parking off S. Maple St., via Gypsy Lane. Bike repair station.	41°21′38″N 83°39′37″W
US 6	1.3	2.1	Underpass	41°20′57″N 83°39′36″W
Portage, Ohio	2.8	4.5	Bathrooms and parking. Bike repair station.	41°19′36″N 83°39′36″W
Rudolph, Ohio	4.9	7.9	Bathrooms and parking. Rudolph Savanna, with sand dunes, and native savanna meadow of tall prairie grasses, under mature trees.	41°17′54″N 83°40′11″W
SR 281 (Defiance Trail)	6	9.7		41°16′59″N 83°40′20″W
Cygnet Road	8.9	14.3	Cygnet, Ohio is 1 mile east. Between Cygnet Rd. and Freyman Rd, path follows winding creek instead of old railroad bed.	41°14′27″N 83°40′27″W
Freyman Road	9.5	15.3	Cricket Frog Cove, half mile west of trail, bathroom and parking.	41°14′01″N 83°40′23″W
North Baltimore, Ohio	12.8	20.6	Bathroom and parking at southern terminus.	41°11′00″N 83°40′30″W
