= Bartlow Township, Ohio =

Township in Ohio, US

Bartlow Township, Henry County, Ohio
- Township
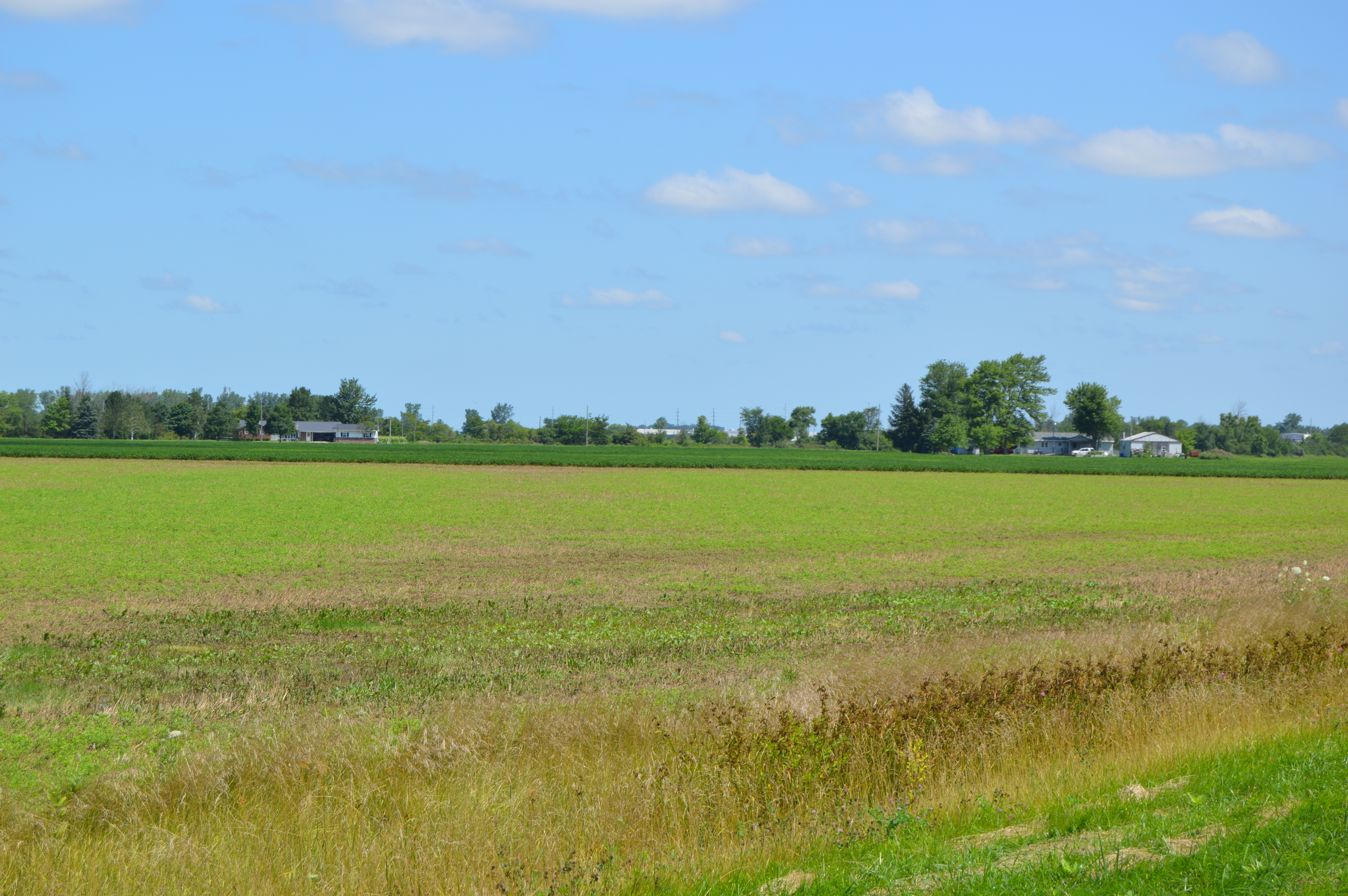
- Fields southwest of Deshler

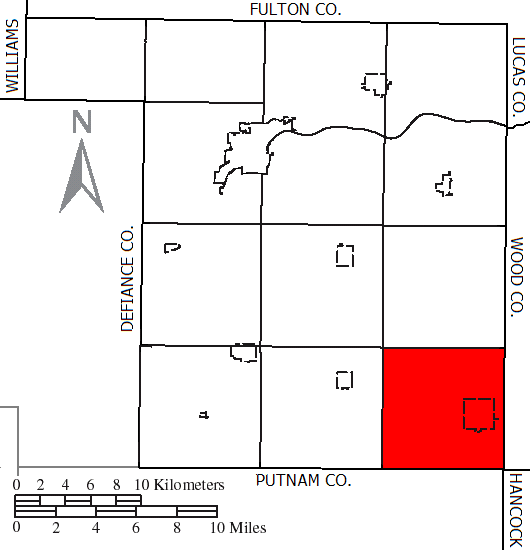
- Location of Bartlow Township in Henry County
- Coordinates: 41°12′37″N 83°55′0″W
- Country: United States
- State: Ohio
- County: Henry

Area
  - Total: 36.3 sq mi (94.0 km^{2})
  - Land: 36.3 sq mi (93.9 km^{2})
  - Water: 0.039 sq mi (0.1 km^{2})
- Elevation: 709 ft (216 m)

Population (2020)
  - Total: 2,187
  - Density: 60.3/sq mi (23.3/km^{2})
- Time zone: UTC-5 (Eastern (EST))
  - Summer (DST): UTC-4 (EDT)
- FIPS code: 39-04052
- GNIS feature ID: 1086286

Bartlow Township is one of the thirteen townships of Henry County, Ohio, United States. As of the 2020 census the population was 2,187.

== Geography ==
Located in the southeastern corner of the county, it borders the following townships:

- Richfield Township - north
- Milton Township, Wood County - northeast corner
- Jackson Township, Wood County - east
- Pleasant Township, Hancock County - southeast corner
- Van Buren Township, Putnam County - south
- Liberty Township, Putnam County - southwest corner
- Marion Township - west
- Monroe Township - northwest corner

It is the only county township to border Hancock County.

The village of Deshler is located in eastern Bartlow Township.

== Name and history ==
It is the only Bartlow Township statewide, although there is a Barlow Township in Washington County.

== Government ==
The township is governed by a three-member board of trustees, who are elected in November of odd-numbered years to a four-year term beginning on the following January 1. Two are elected in the year after the presidential election and one is elected in the year before it. There is also an elected township fiscal officer, who serves a four-year term beginning on April 1 of the year after the election, which is held in November of the year before the presidential election. Vacancies in the fiscal officership or on the board of trustees are filled by the remaining trustees.

Public education for the township is administered by the Patrick Henry Local School District.
