= PacSun =

American retail clothing brand

Pacific Sunwear of California, LLC

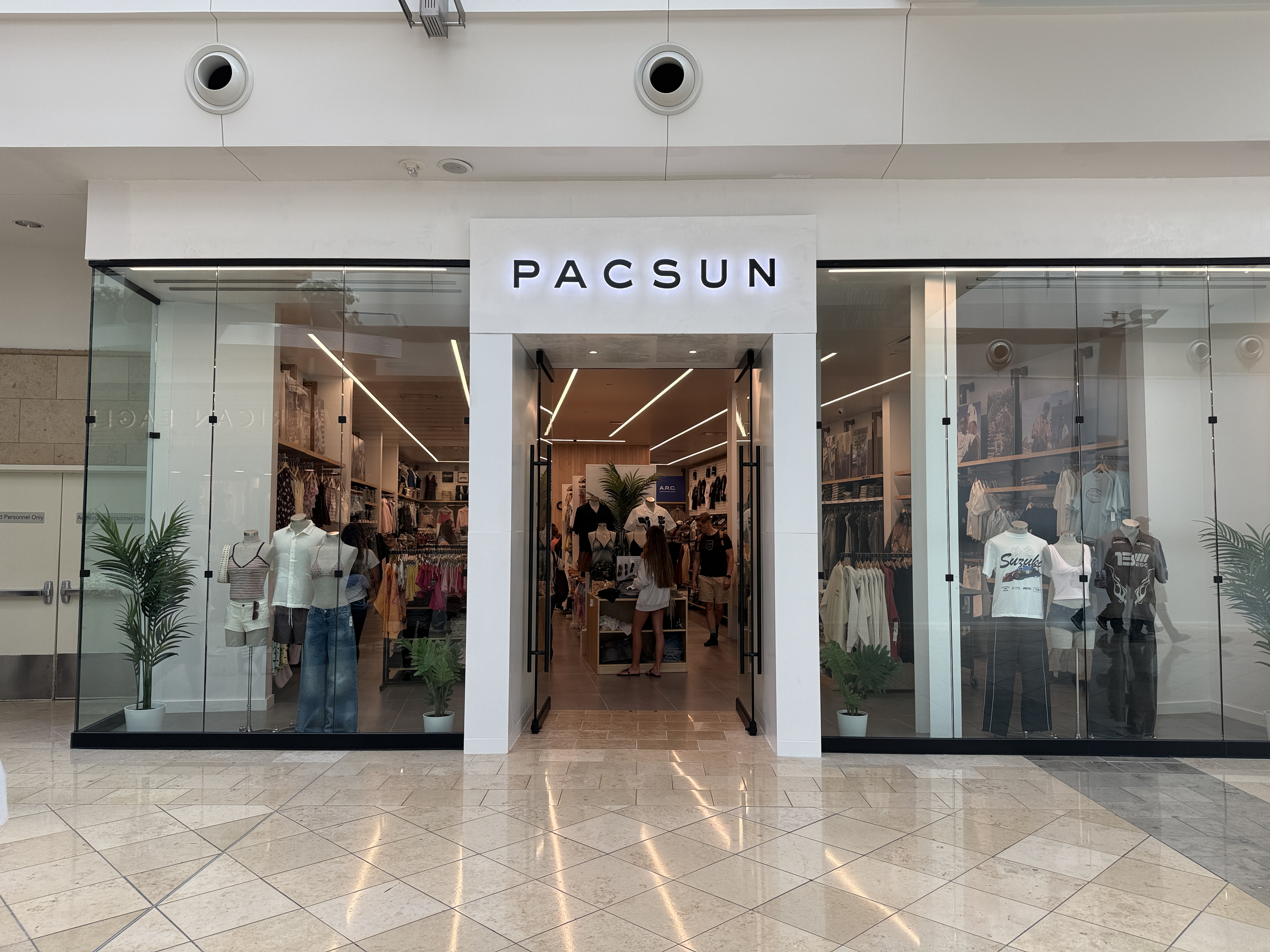
- A PacSun store located at The Mall at Millenia in Orlando, Florida
- Trade name: PacSun
- Type: Private
- Founded: Newport Beach, California, U.S. (1980)
- Founder: Jack Hopkins
- Headquarters: Anaheim, California, U.S.
- Number of locations: ▼325 (May 2022)
- Area served: United States; Canada
- Products: California inspired clothing, footwear, and accessories.
- Revenue: ▲US$ 950 million (2025)
- Owner: PSEB (Golden Gate Capital)
- Number of employees: ▼8,200 (June 2020)
- Website: pacsun.com

Pacific Sunwear of California, LLC, commonly known as PacSun, is an American retail clothing brand. The company sells lifestyle apparel, along with swim, footwear and accessories designed for teens and young adults. As of 2025, the company operated 325 stores in 46 states and Puerto Rico. PacSun is headquartered in Anaheim, California, and formerly operated a distribution center in Groveport, Ohio. The company's regional directors, district managers and store positions are located throughout the United States. The company went bankrupt in April 2016 and is now owned by Golden Gate Capital.

== History ==
Last D.E.M.O. logo, introduced in 2006 as Pacsun hoped to expand operations of the chain

Original D.E.M.O. logo from 2000

Initially founded by Jack Hopkins and Tom Moore in 1980, its roots can be traced back to a small surf shop in Seal Beach, California. Pacsun built its business selling merchandise from established surf brands but later expanded to include skate and streetwear labels. The company offers products for both men and women that include: jeans, tees, tanks, polos, knits, flannels, hoodies, boardshorts, bikinis, shorts, pants, dresses, rompers, skirts, sweaters, jackets, snow apparel, shoes, sandals and accessories. The company had an initial public offering on March 15, 1993, and at its height had over 1,300 stores in all 50 states. Pacsun opened a second chain of stores called d.e.m.o., in 2000. The last of these stores closed in 2008.

On February 23, 2005, the company restated results for certain periods to correct its accounting for leases.

In 2012, Pacsun collaborated with celebrity influencers Kendall Jenner and Kylie Jenner to produce their own fashion line.

From 2009 to 2017, Gary Schoenfeld was the CEO of Pacsun. Following his departure from the organization, James Gulmi became the interim CEO.

In 2016, Pacsun filed for Chapter 11 bankruptcy and reorganized through a debt-for-equity restructuring agreement with Golden Gate Capital, emerging as a privately owned company. At the time of the bankruptcy filing, there were 593 stores with no immediate plans to close any locations.

In 2018, Pacsun merged with Eddie Bauer, also owned by Golden Gate, to form PSEB. Mike Egeck, CEO and president of Eddie Bauer, became the chief executive officer of PSEB, with oversight of both the Eddie Bauer and PacSun brands. James Gulmi continued to serve as a PSEB director.

On February 4, 2020, Egeck stepped down from his role of CEO, but remained as an active board member and shareholder. PSEB announced that James Gulmi would become the interim CEO, a role he previously held from 2017 to 2018. At the time of the announcement, Pacsun was down to 400 stores.

On September 25, 2020, Pacsun launched the 'Gender Neutral Shop', a unisex collection of basic clothing, graphics, pants, hoodies and sneakers. With this collection, the company is "taking a big step towards a more sartorially inclusive future, joining in on a generational movement of less rules and more options".

In February 2021, Pacsun partnered with YouTuber and fashion icon Emma Chamberlain for their Spring campaign.

In November 2022, Pacsun debuted its collaboration with Formula 1 at ComplexCon, releasing a six-piece collection featuring co-branded apparel such as graphic tees and sweatshirts. This marked the beginning of a multi-year licensing partnership aimed at expanding Formula 1's presence among Gen Z consumers in the U.S.

In March 2023, Brie Olson, then Pacsun president and board member, was appointed co-chief executive officer alongside Mike Relich, following Alfred Chang's departure after 17 years with the company. In May, Olson was named sole CEO, effective June 15, 2023, as Mike Relich retired from his role as co-CEO and transitioned to vice chairman on the Pacsun Board.

In 2024, Pacsun continued its collaborations with professional sports organizations, extending partnerships with the Los Angeles Football Club (LAFC) and the Los Angeles Rams. These partnerships included co-branded apparel releases, event activations, and community initiatives.

On September 22, 2025, Pacsun hosted its inaugural Purpose Partner Summit, bringing together over 300 leaders from various industries to discuss purpose-driven leadership and youth culture. At the summit, Pacsun also released its first Youth Report, a study conducted in partnership with GlobalData, providing insights into the values and behaviors of Gen Z and Gen Alpha.

== Gallery ==
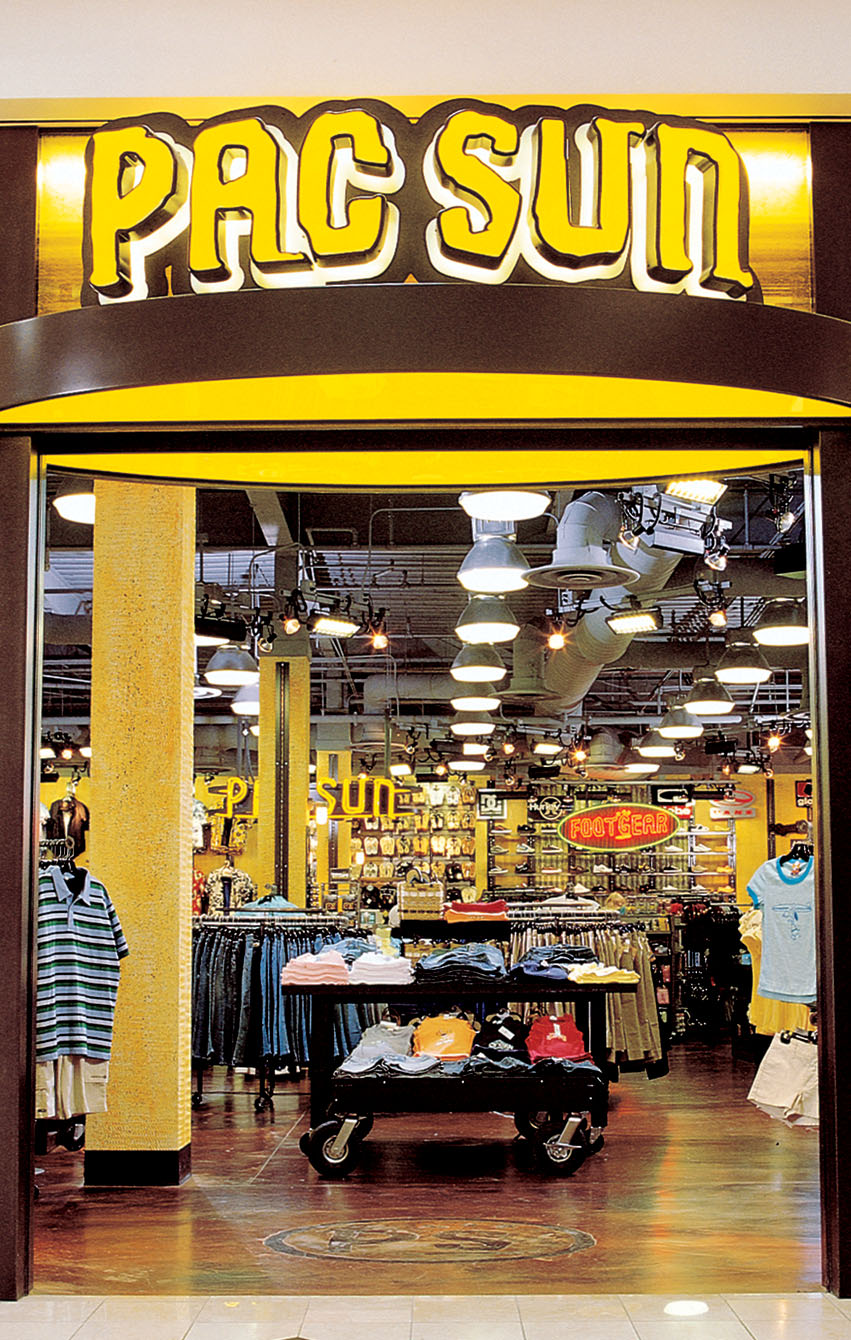
A PacSun store in 2003.

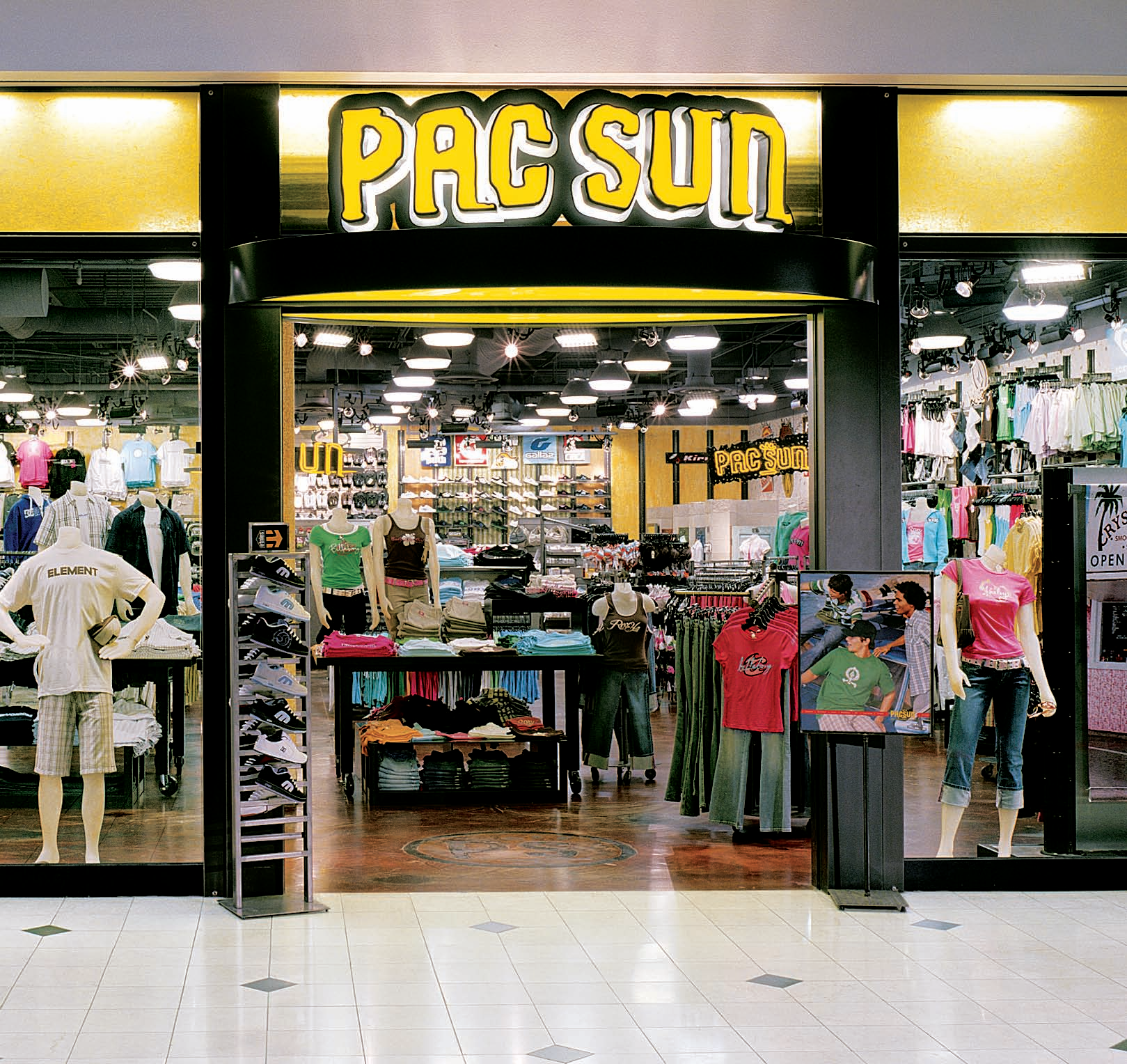
A PacSun store in 2004.

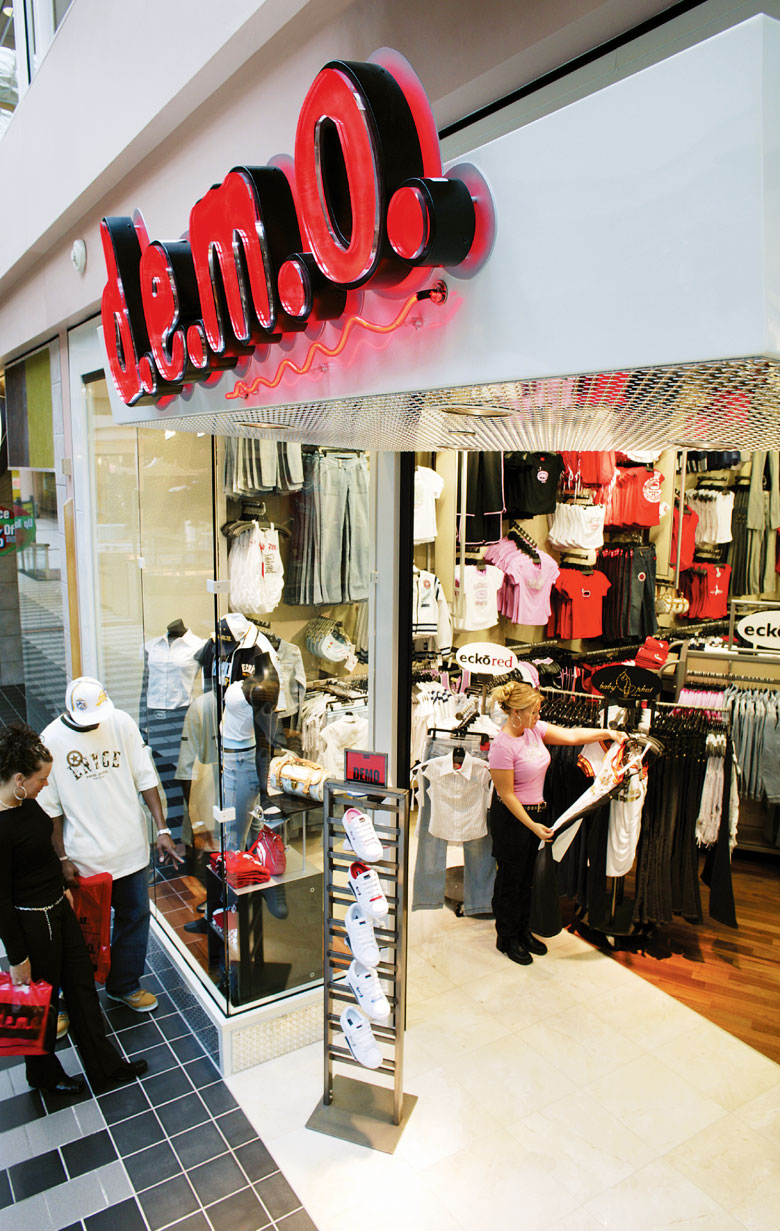
A d.e.m.o. store pictured in 2003.

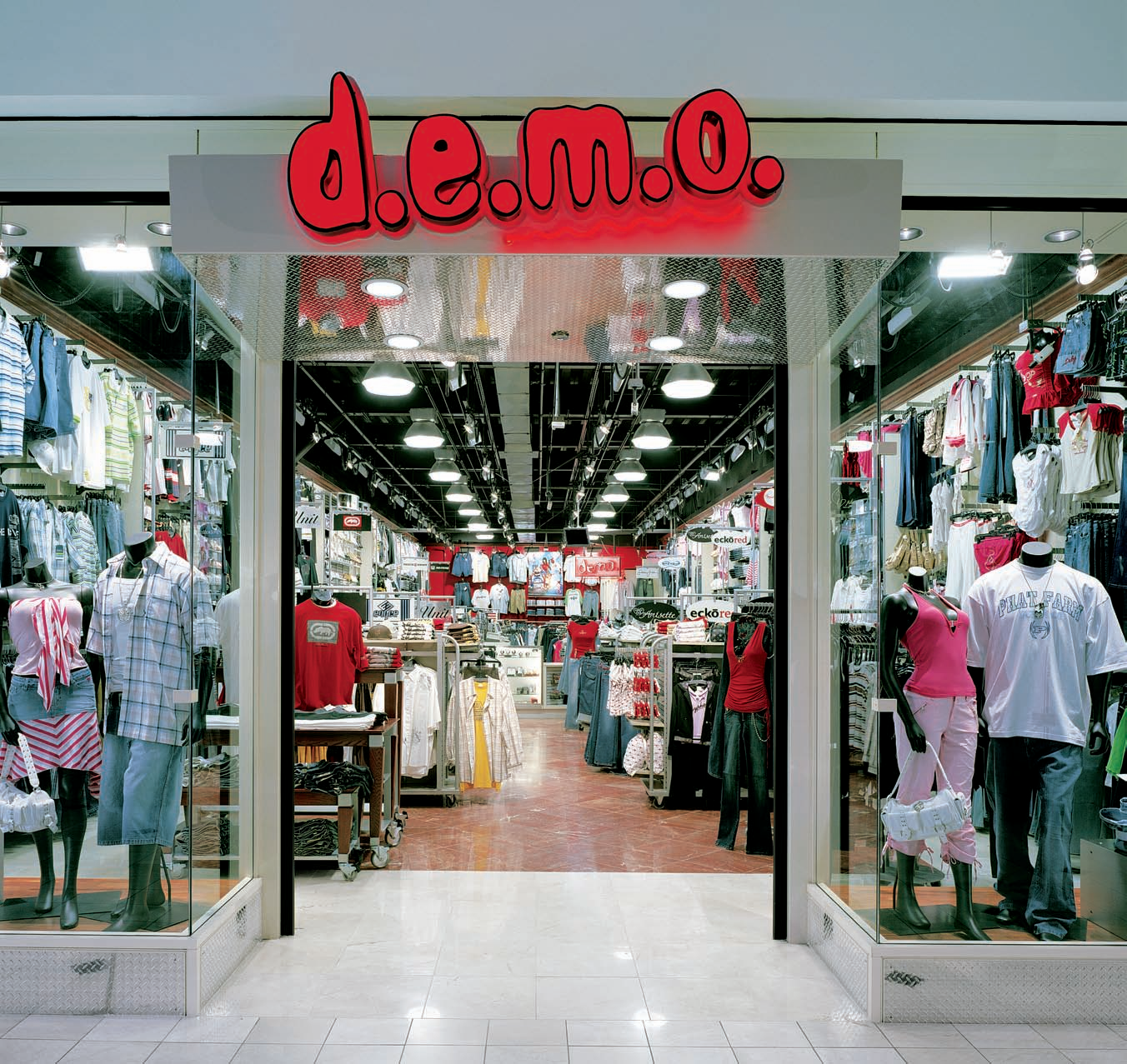
A d.e.m.o. store pictured in 2004.

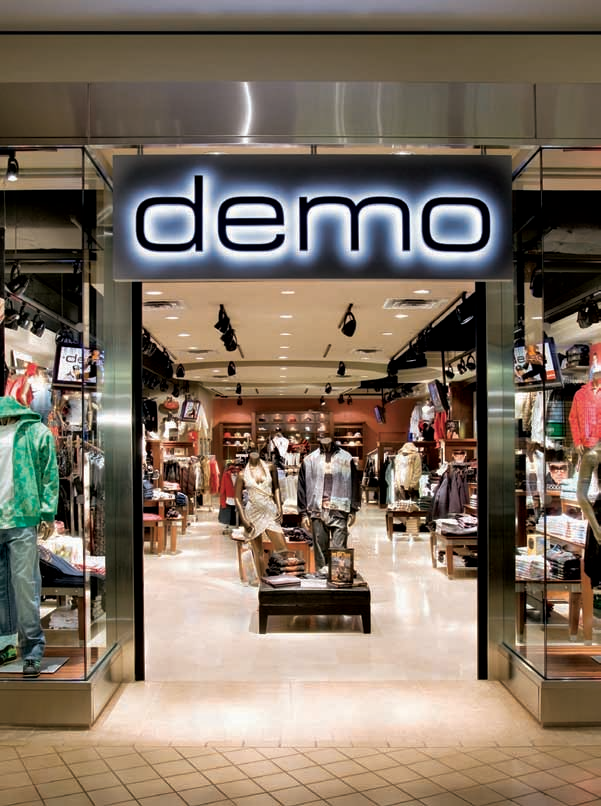
A d.e.m.o. store pictured in 2006.

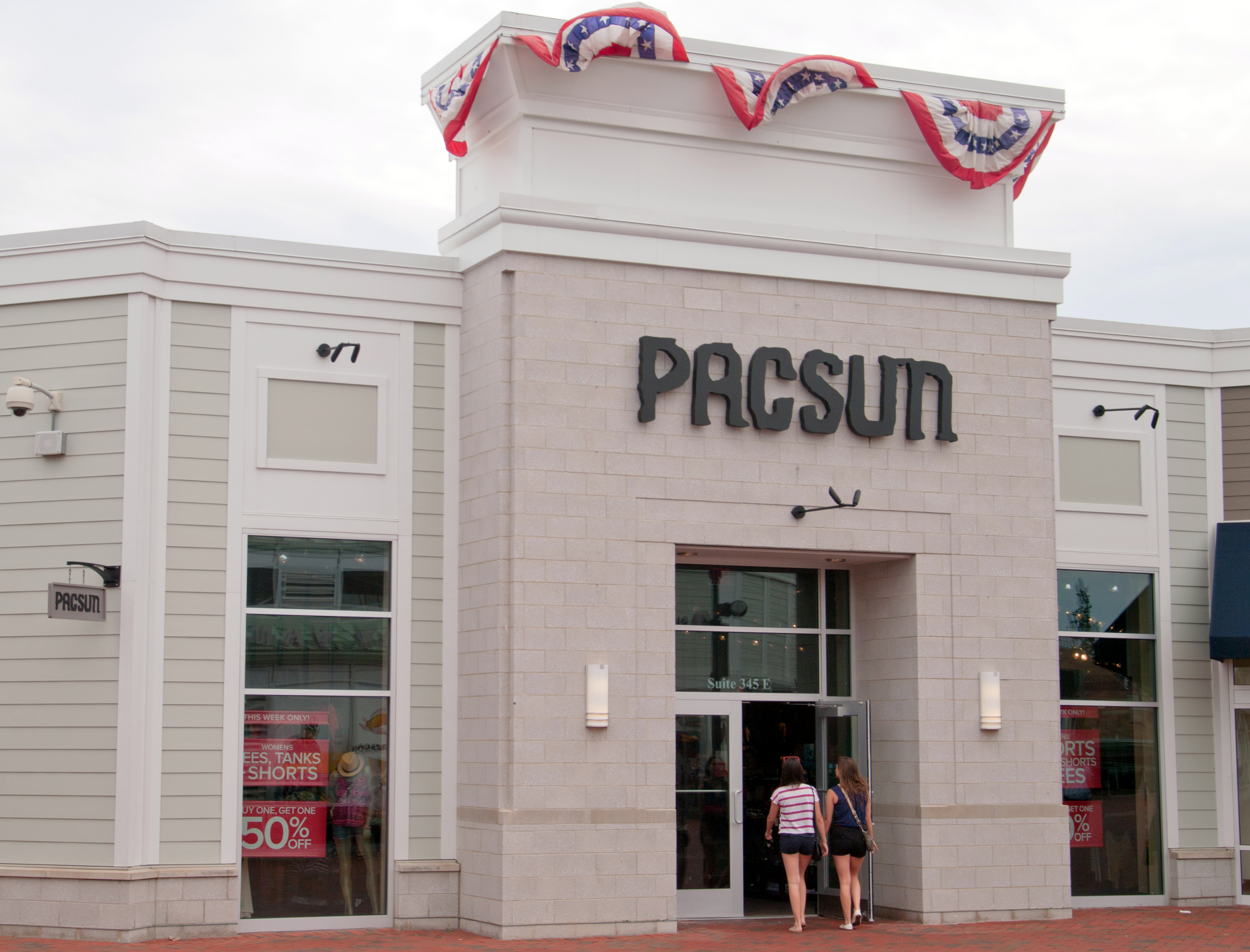
A freestanding PacSun store in Freeport, Maine, pictured in July 2012.

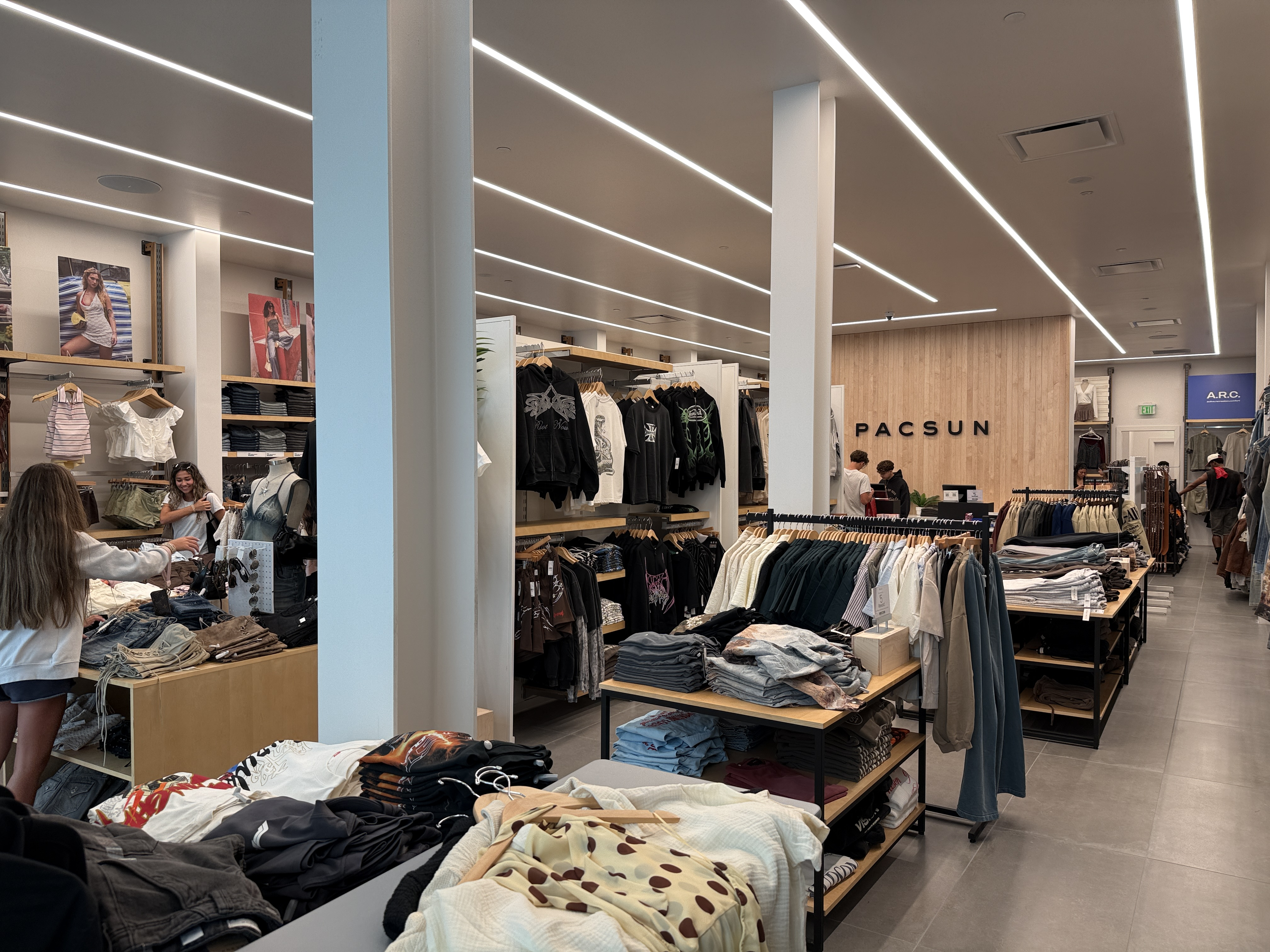
Inside of a modern-day PacSun store in April 2026.
