= Marion Township, Henry County, Ohio =

Township in Ohio, US

- Township
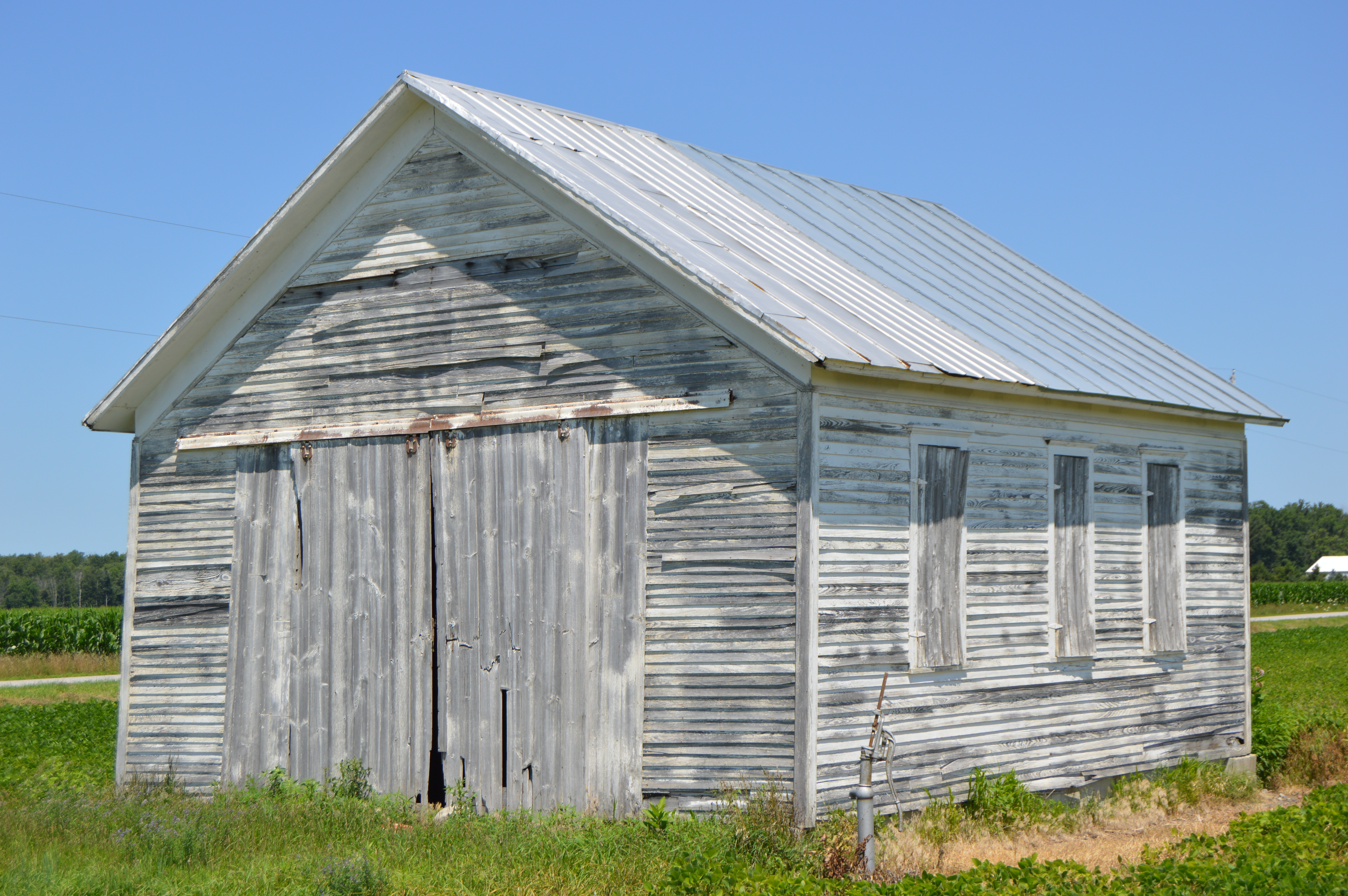
- Abandoned school west of Hamler

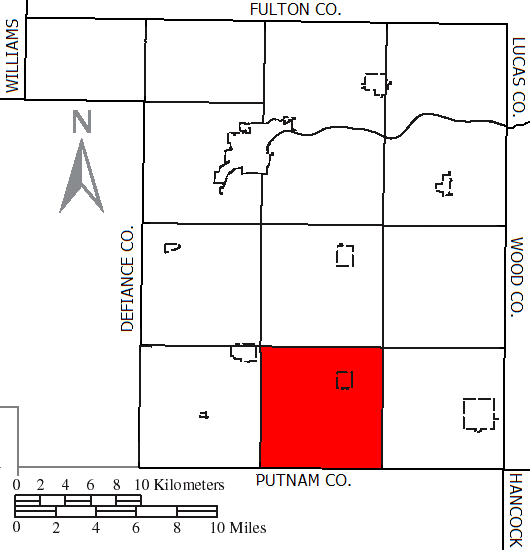
- Location of Marion Township in Henry County
- Coordinates: 41°13′19″N 84°3′0″W
- Country: United States
- State: Ohio
- County: Henry

Area
  - Total: 36.3 sq mi (93.9 km^{2})
  - Land: 36.3 sq mi (93.9 km^{2})
  - Water: 0 sq mi (0.0 km^{2})
- Elevation: 712 ft (217 m)

Population (2020)
  - Total: 1,301
  - Density: 35.9/sq mi (13.9/km^{2})
- Time zone: UTC-5 (Eastern (EST))
  - Summer (DST): UTC-4 (EDT)
- FIPS code: 39-47726
- GNIS feature ID: 1086292

Marion Township is one of the thirteen townships of Henry County, Ohio, United States. As of the 2020 census the population was 1,301.

== Geography ==
Located in the southern part of the county, it borders the following townships:

- Monroe Township - north
- Richfield Township - northeast corner
- Bartlow Township - east
- Van Buren Township, Putnam County - southeast corner
- Liberty Township, Putnam County - south
- Palmer Township, Putnam County - southwest corner
- Pleasant Township - west
- Flatrock Township - northwest corner

The village of Hamler is located in northeastern Marion Township.

== Name and history ==
It is one of twelve Marion Townships statewide.

== Government ==
The township is governed by a three-member board of trustees, who are elected in November of odd-numbered years to a four-year term beginning on the following January 1. Two are elected in the year after the presidential election and one is elected in the year before it. There is also an elected township fiscal officer, who serves a four-year term beginning on April 1 of the year after the election, which is held in November of the year before the presidential election. Vacancies in the fiscal officership or on the board of trustees are filled by the remaining trustees.
