= Steven Davis (executive) =

American business executive

Steven Anthony Davis (born 1958/1959-June 10, 2022) is an American business executive from Milwaukee, Wisconsin, formerly the CEO of Bob Evans Restaurants, and former president of Long John Silver's and A&W Restaurants.

== Background ==
The youngest of five children of Henry and Dolores Davis, African Americans in Milwaukee who never had the opportunity to attend a college or university (Dolores had to decline a scholarship to Cardinal Stritch College in order to attend to her sickly mother), Davis graduated from Messmer High School (Milwaukee), and in 1980 received a B.A. in business administration from the University of Wisconsin–Milwaukee (all four of his older siblings had also graduated from UWM). He went on to earn his M.B.A. at the University of Chicago.

== Business career ==
Davis worked as an executive at Kraft Foods for nine years, and Pizza Hut/YUM! Brands for 14 years. In 2005, Black Enterprise magazine named him one of the "75 Most Powerful Black Men in American Business."

He is on several boards of directors, including those of Marathon Petroleum and Walgreens.

== Personal life ==
Davis lives in New Albany, Ohio, with his wife Lynnda. They have three daughters.
