= Custar, Ohio =

- Village
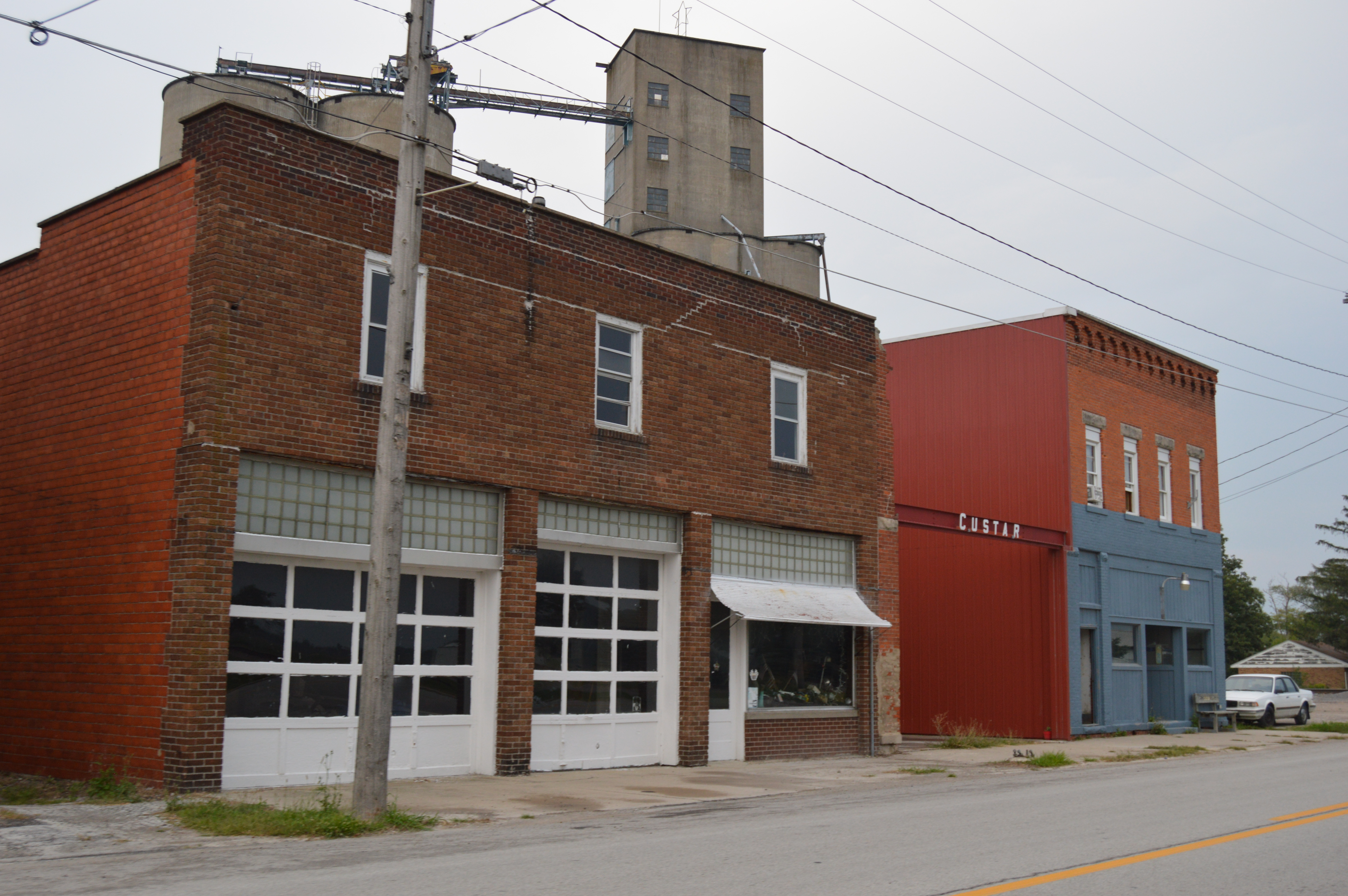
- Defiance Street in central Custar

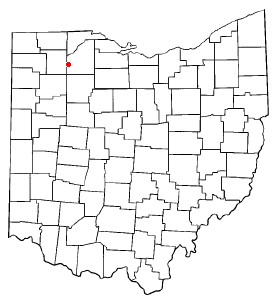
- Location of Custar, Ohio

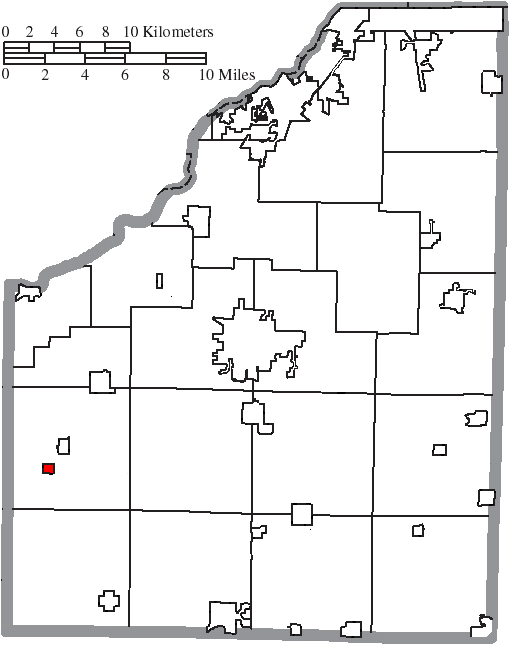
- Location of Custar in Wood County
- Coordinates: 41°17′05″N 83°50′38″W
- Country: United States
- State: Ohio
- County: Wood
- Township: Milton

Government
  - Type: Town council

Area
  - Total: 0.25 sq mi (0.65 km^{2})
  - Land: 0.25 sq mi (0.65 km^{2})
  - Water: 0 sq mi (0.00 km^{2})
- Elevation: 692 ft (211 m)

Population (2020)
  - Total: 178
  - Estimate (2023): 178
  - Density: 710.3/sq mi (274.23/km^{2})
- Time zone: UTC-5 (Eastern (EST))
  - Summer (DST): UTC-4 (EDT)
- ZIP code: 43511
- Area code: 419
- FIPS code: 39-19750
- GNIS feature ID: 2398662
- Website: https://www.custarvillage.org/

Custar is a village in Wood County, Ohio, United States. The population was 178 at the 2020 census.

== History ==
Custar was originally called Lewisburg, and under the latter name was platted in 1865, and named for Frederick Lewis, proprietor. A post office called Custar has been in operation since 1866. The village was incorporated in 1881.

In late 2019, three grain silos in Custar suffered from a fire and explosion.

== Geography ==
According to the United States Census Bureau, the village has a total area of 0.25 square miles (0.65 km^{2}), all land.

== Demographics ==
Historical population
Census	Pop.	Note	%±
1880	248		—
1890	329		32.7%
1900	293		−10.9%
1910	345		17.7%
1920	316		−8.4%
1930	257		−18.7%
1940	250		−2.7%
1950	263		5.2%
1960	246		−6.5%
1970	277		12.6%
1980	254		−8.3%
1990	209		−17.7%
2000	208		−0.5%
2010	179		−13.9%
2020	178		−0.6%
2023 (est.)	178	Steady	0.0%
U.S. Decennial Census

=== 2010 census ===
As of the census of 2010, there were 179 people, 73 households, and 45 families living in the village. The population density was 716.0 inhabitants per square mile (276.4/km^{2}). There were 83 housing units at an average density of 332.0 per square mile (128.2/km^{2}). The racial makeup of the village was 94.4% White, 0.6% Native American, 2.2% from other races, and 2.8% from two or more races. Hispanic or Latino of any race were 6.1% of the population.

There were 73 households, of which 31.5% had children under the age of 18 living with them, 52.1% were married couples living together, 4.1% had a female householder with no husband present, 5.5% had a male householder with no wife present, and 38.4% were non-families. 30.1% of all households were made up of individuals, and 9.6% had someone living alone who was 65 years of age or older. The average household size was 2.45 and the average family size was 3.13.

The median age in the village was 32.2 years. 25.7% of residents were under the age of 18; 7.2% were between the ages of 18 and 24; 33.5% were from 25 to 44; 22.8% were from 45 to 64; and 10.6% were 65 years of age or older. The gender makeup of the village was 52.0% male and 48.0% female.

=== 2000 census ===
As of the census of 2000, there were 208 people, 72 households, and 58 families living in the village. The population density was 830.2 inhabitants per square mile (320.5/km^{2}). There were 73 housing units at an average density of 291.4 per square mile (112.5/km^{2}). The racial makeup of the village was 98.08% White, 0.48% Native American, 1.44% from other races. Hispanic or Latino of any race were 3.37% of the population.

There were 72 households, out of which 40.3% had children under the age of 18 living with them, 65.3% were married couples living together, 13.9% had a female householder with no husband present, and 19.4% were non-families. 19.4% of all households were made up of individuals, and 12.5% had someone living alone who was 65 years of age or older. The average household size was 2.86 and the average family size was 3.22.

In the village, the population was spread out, with 27.4% under the age of 18, 11.5% from 18 to 24, 33.2% from 25 to 44, 16.8% from 45 to 64, and 11.1% who were 65 years of age or older. The median age was 35 years. For every 100 females there were 89.1 males. For every 100 females age 18 and over, there were 86.4 males.

The median income for a household in the village was $37,813, and the median income for a family was $39,583. Males had a median income of $32,083 versus $21,964 for females. The per capita income for the village was $16,508. About 8.3% of families and 12.9% of the population were below the poverty line, including 23.1% of those under the age of eighteen and 16.7% of those 65 or over.

== Education ==
It is in the Bowling Green City School District.
