= Bob Evans (restaurateur) =

American restaurateur

- Born: Robert Lewis Evans; May 30, 1918; Sugar Ridge, Ohio
- Died: June 21, 2007 (aged 89); Cleveland, Ohio
- Known for: Founding the restaurant chain Bob Evans

Robert Lewis Evans (May 30, 1918 – June 21, 2007) was an American restaurateur and farmer. He was the founder of the Bob Evans family style restaurant chain. He founded the chain in 1948.

== Early life and career ==
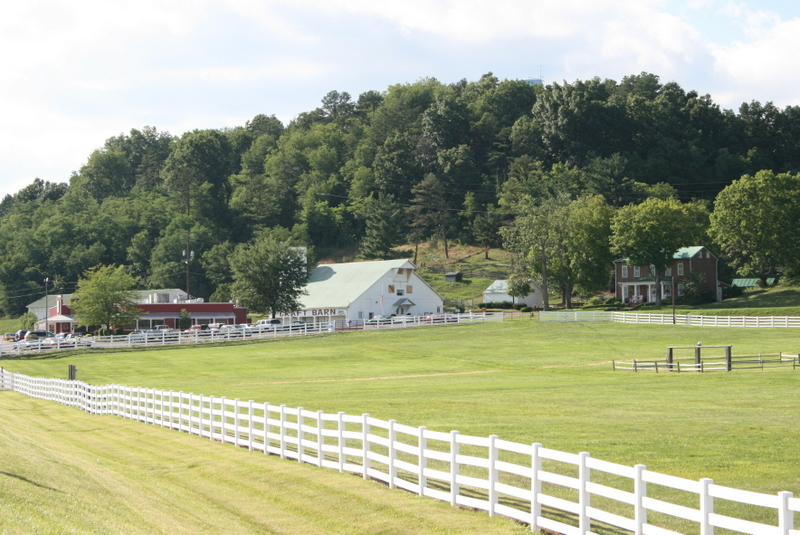
Bob Evans' farm in Rio Grande, Ohio, with a Bob Evans restaurant (left), pictured in 2007”

Evans was born on May 30, 1918, to Stanley Lewis Evans and Elizabeth Evans (née Lewis), both of Welsh descent, in Sugar Ridge, Ohio, located in Center Township in Wood County, Ohio, where his father and uncle farmed on rented land.

The family moved to Gallia County, Ohio, in 1929 to be near relatives. The family settled in Gallipolis, Ohio, where his father owned and managed a grocery store. Evans attended public schools in Gallipolis and graduated with honors in 1937 from the Greenbrier Military School, a boys-only private military boarding high school in Lewisburg, West Virginia. He attended Ohio State University School of Veterinary Medicine from 1937 to 1939.

Evans married Jewell Victoria Waters (November 4, 1919 – July 24, 2019) in June 1940. They moved to Gallipolis, where he bought a restaurant named the Malt Shop in the early 1940s. When Evans was inducted into the Army in 1943, he sold his interest in the restaurant to a friend.

Bob Evans Farms got its start when Evans began making sausage on his southeastern Ohio farm to serve at a 12-stool diner he owned in nearby Gallipolis in 1948. Evans could not find a source of satisfactory sausage, so he began making his own, slaughtering his own hogs and using the best parts of the hog. The building where he made the sausage was built with open ends, at the suggestion of his father, so it could be used as a machinery shed if the sausage business failed. In 1953, a group of friends and family recognized the growing demand for Evans's sausage and became his business partners by establishing Bob Evans Farms. The original Bob Evans Restaurant on the farm was called The Sausage Shop. Although it started with 12 stools, today the restaurant can seat 134.

== Bob Evans Restaurants ==
In 1953, the business was incorporated as Bob Evans Farms Inc. By 1957, the company opened four sausage plants to keep up with demand. In 1963, Bob Evans Farms Inc had its IPO. Evans served as a director and president of the company until his retirement on December 31, 1986.

Local restaurants were not willing to buy Evans' sausage, so he started his own, with the first opening on his farm in 1962. These restaurants were designed in a red and white color "Steamboat Victorian" style. The first of these "new" Bob Evans Restaurants was located in Chillicothe, Ohio. By the early 1970s, the restaurants had expanded throughout Ohio. Expansion into other states was started in the late 1970s. By 2012, Bob Evans Farms, Inc. was a $1.7 billion restaurant and retail food products company with over 500 restaurants in 19 states. In 2017 the restaurant chain was purchased by a private equity firm, the frozen food division split off and purchased separately. The Nasdaq stock was delisted in 2018.

== Accomplishments and community support ==
Although Evans retired from the company in 1986, he remained actively involved in his community and with numerous causes. Evans encouraged local farmers to use more efficient livestock grazing techniques that are better for the environment.

The only person in Ohio to be honored three times by the National Wildlife Federation, Evans spent more than 40 years preserving wildlife. He also planted seeds for the future of the agricultural industry through his support of youth organizations such as 4-H and FFA and his involvement in higher education. He was a former member of the Ohio Board of Regents, the state's public higher-education governing board. He also worked with college students at the Ohio State University's College of Food, Agricultural, and Environmental Sciences. He also supported many community organizations, including the Heart Fund, Ohio Society for the Prevention of Blindness, Arthritis Foundation, and Easter Seals.

In 2005, Evans was honored by FAO as an inaugural "I'm a Child of Appalachia" honoree for his philanthropic efforts, entrepreneurial success, and support of improved access to higher education in the region. The "I'm a Child of Appalachia" campaign uses individual success stories to promote greater investment in the region to increase student access to postsecondary education.

== Death and burial ==
Evans died on June 21, 2007, three weeks after his 89th birthday, while being treated at the Cleveland Clinic in Cleveland, Ohio, from complications of a stroke and recuperating from pneumonia. Bob Evans is buried in Mound Hill Cemetery in Gallipolis, Ohio.

Upon learning of his death, Ohio governor Ted Strickland remarked: "Bob Evans was a true original. His life's work was bringing the warmth, hospitality, and good food of Ohio to rest of the nation. We here in Ohio are all proud of him and we are all deeply saddened by his passing."

== Bob Evans Farm ==
Bob and Jewell Evans purchased the Niamiah Woods farm near Rio Grande, Ohio, from Rio Grande College in 1952. They lived in the farmhouse for nearly twenty years. Now the old homestead is called Bob Evans Farm and is listed on the National Register of Historic Places. The house is the home of the Homestead Museum about Bob Evans and his company. The Bob Evans Farm Festival, featuring crafts, antiques, demonstrations, and entertainment, is held every year at the farm in Rio Grande during the second weekend of October.

== See also ==
- Breakfast sausage
- List of American restaurateurs
