= Milton Township, Wood County, Ohio =

Township in Ohio, US

- Township
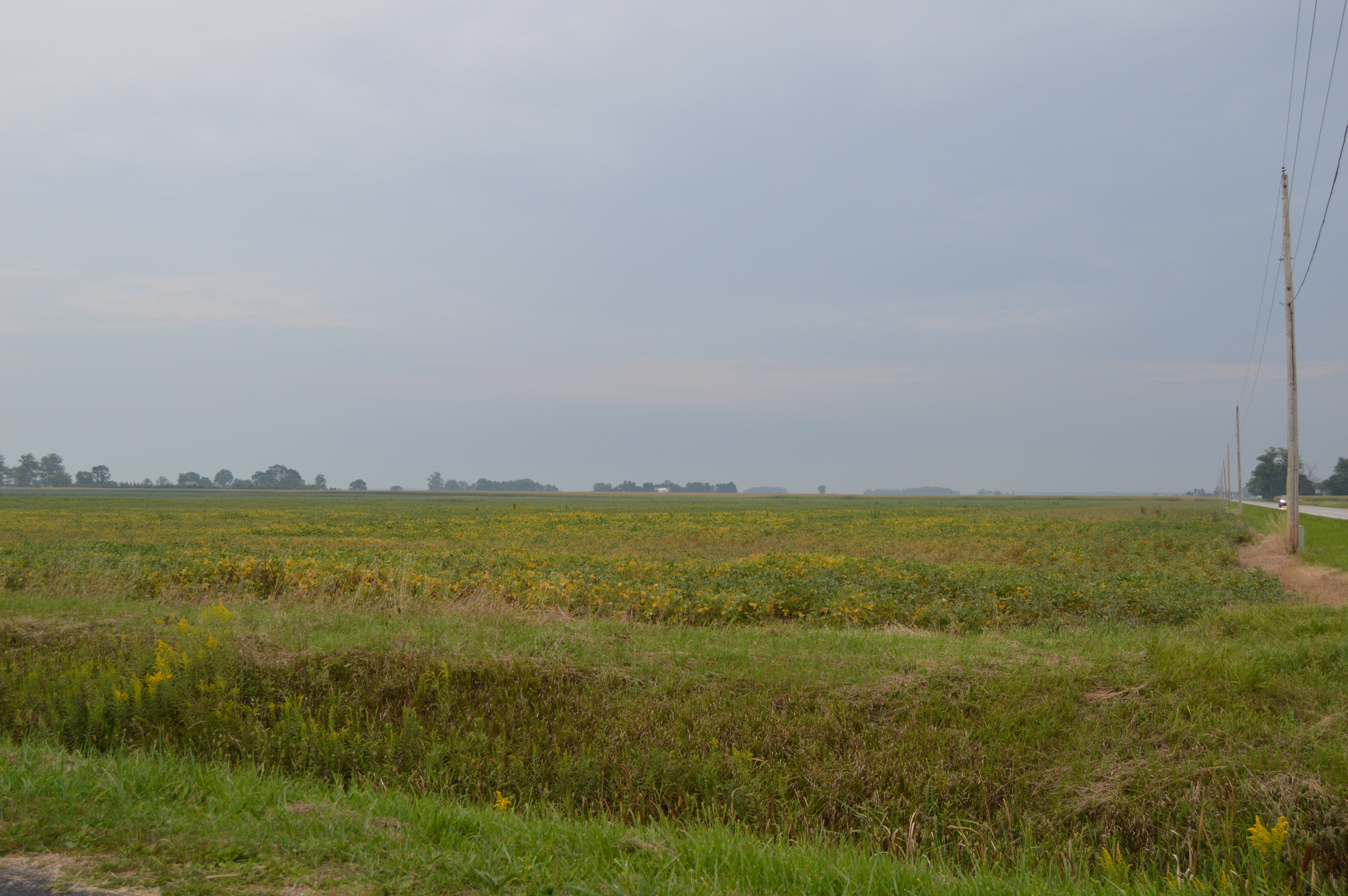
- Fields east of Custar

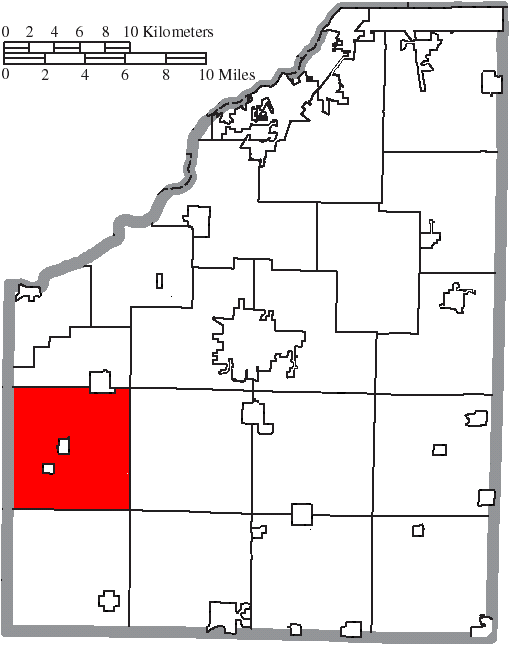
- Location of Milton Township in Wood County
- Coordinates: 41°18′8″N 83°49′43″W
- Country: United States
- State: Ohio
- County: Wood

Area
  - Total: 36.6 sq mi (94.8 km^{2})
  - Land: 36.6 sq mi (94.8 km^{2})
  - Water: 0 sq mi (0.0 km^{2})
- Elevation: 686 ft (209 m)

Population (2020)
  - Total: 929
  - Density: 25.4/sq mi (9.80/km^{2})
- Time zone: UTC-5 (Eastern (EST))
  - Summer (DST): UTC-4 (EDT)
- FIPS code: 39-50680
- GNIS feature ID: 1087189

Milton Township is one of the nineteen townships of Wood County, Ohio, United States. The 2020 census found 929 people in the township.

== Geography ==
Located in the western part of the county, it borders the following townships:

- Weston Township - north
- Plain Township - northeast corner
- Liberty Township - east
- Henry Township - southeast corner
- Jackson Township - south
- Bartlow Township, Henry County - southwest corner
- Richfield Township, Henry County - west
- Damascus Township, Henry County - northwest corner

Three villages are located in the township:

- Custar, in the west center.
- Milton Center, in the north center.
- Part of Weston, in the north.

== Name and history ==
Milton Township was established in 1835. It is one of five Milton Townships statewide.

== Government ==
The township is governed by a three-member board of trustees, who are elected in November of odd-numbered years to a four-year term beginning on the following January 1. Two are elected in the year after the presidential election and one is elected in the year before it. There is also an elected township fiscal officer, who serves a four-year term beginning on April 1 of the year after the election, which is held in November of the year before the presidential election. Vacancies in the fiscal officership or on the board of trustees are filled by the remaining trustees.
