= Rudolph, Ohio =

- Census-designated place
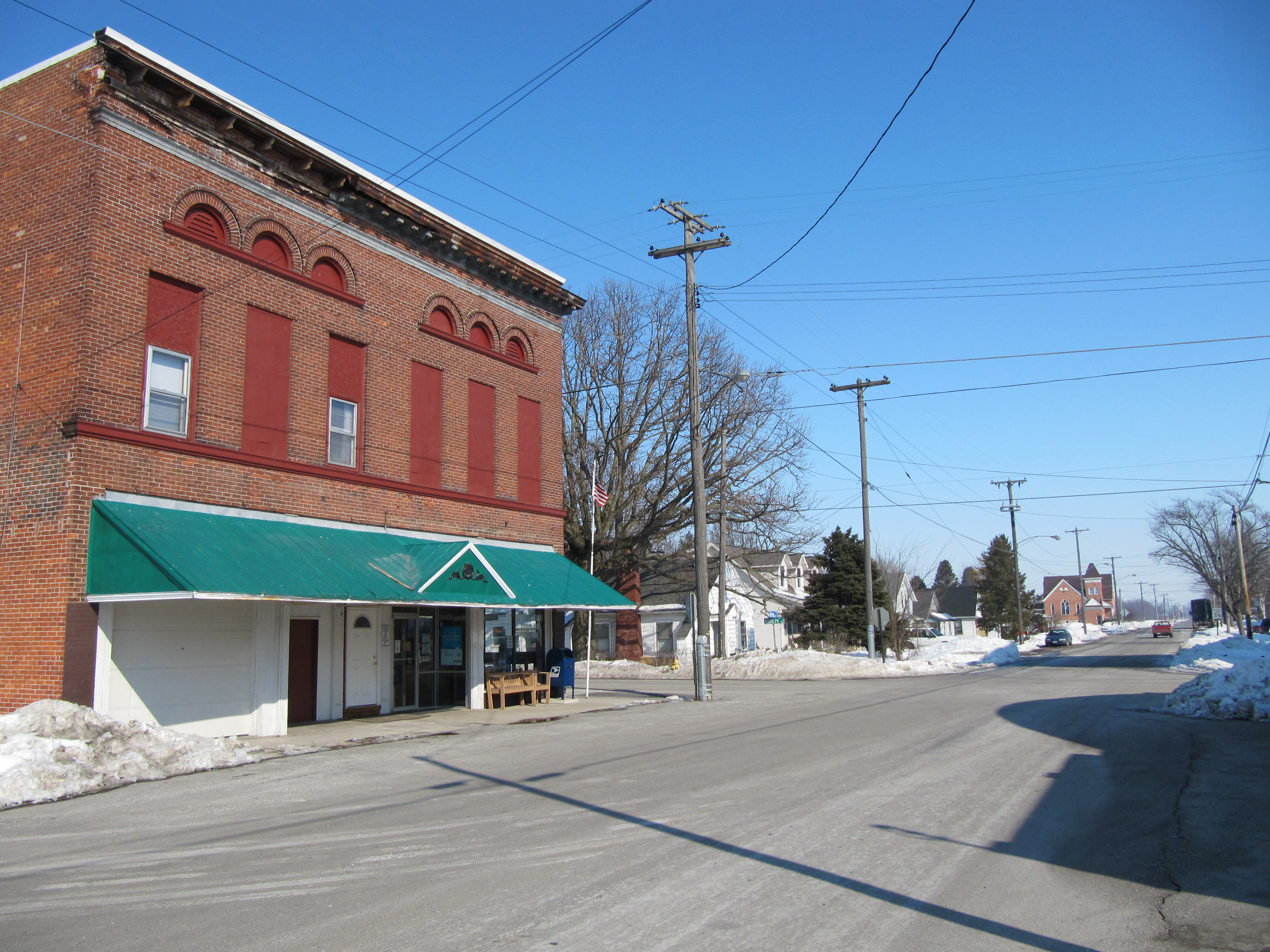
- Main Street in Rudolph, Ohio, showing the local post office

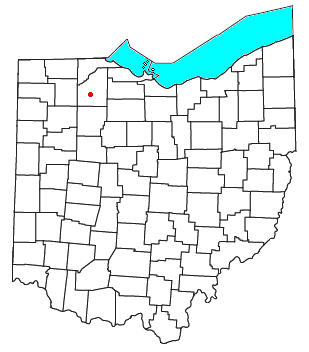
- Location of Rudolph, Ohio
- Coordinates: 41°17′48″N 83°39′51″W
- Country: United States
- State: Ohio
- County: Wood

Area
  - Total: 0.81 sq mi (2.10 km^{2})
  - Land: 0.81 sq mi (2.10 km^{2})
  - Water: 0 sq mi (0.00 km^{2})
- Elevation: 682 ft (208 m)

Population (2020)
  - Total: 415
  - Density: 512.6/sq mi (197.93/km^{2})
- Time zone: UTC-5 (Eastern (EST))
  - Summer (DST): UTC-4 (EDT)
- ZIP code: 43462
- Area code: 419
- FIPS code: 39-68938
- GNIS feature ID: 2628965

Rudolph is an unincorporated community and census-designated place (CDP) in eastern Liberty Township, Wood County, Ohio, United States. As of the 2020 census, it had a population of 415. It has a post office with the ZIP code 43462.

== History ==
Rudolph was originally called Mercers, and under the latter was platted in 1890 and named for Daniel Mercer, proprietor. A post office called Rudolph has been in operation since 1891. The present name honors H. J. Rudolph, a town merchant.

The post office in Rudolph has been offering a special Christmas postmark since 1990. According to the Toledo Blade in 2014, "Charlotte Lamb, the officer in charge at the Rudolph post office... estimates between 75,000 and 100,000 parcels come through the office every year.".

== Geography ==
Rudolph is located 6 miles (10 km) south of Bowling Green. According to the U.S. Census Bureau, the CDP has an area of 0.81 square miles (2.1 km^{2}), all land.

Rudolph is connected to Bowling Green and North Baltimore by the Slippery Elm Trail.

== Demographics ==
Historical population
Census	Pop.	Note	%±
2020	415		—
U.S. Decennial Census

== Education ==
It is in the Bowling Green City School District.
