= Golden Gate Capital =

American investment management firm

- Company type: Private
- Industry: Private equity
- Founded: 2000; 26 years ago
- Founder: David Dominik, et al
- Headquarters: One Embarcadero Center, San Francisco, California, United States
- Products: Leveraged buyout, growth capital
- AUM: $15+ billion
- Number of employees: 75
- Website: www.goldengatecap.com

Golden Gate Capital is an American private equity firm based in San Francisco. It was founded in 2000 by former investment professionals from private equity firm Bain Capital and its affiliate, Bain & Company, led by former BC partner David Dominik.

The company makes investments in a number of select industries, including technology, financial services, retail and industrial, through leveraged buyout transactions, as well as significant minority purchases and growth capital investments. As of April 2018, it had over $15 billion in assets under management.

As of 2017, it had approximately 54 investment professionals. Its investment fund is structured as an evergreen fund with no finite life, meaning Golden Gate does not have to sell all investments within five to 10 years in order to raise another fund and can instead fund-raise as deals are made.

== Holdings ==
Following the bursting of the dot-com bubble, the firm had shown a pattern of investments in technology companies that may have been distressed by the Great Recession in the United States at that time.

In 2006, it bought Neways International for $500 Million, acquiring the company at an auction held by the divorce court. A prior $700 million transaction, led by Ramy El-Batrawi, had been abandoned, due to feuding between the divorcing couple that owned Neways International, each of whom were convicted, the previous year, on "six counts of income tax evasion and a conspiracy to defraud the IRS", and sentenced to more than two years in prison. Ramy El-Batrawi died of unknown causes on April 23, 2024.

On May 15, 2007, Limited Brands announced its intent to sell a 67% stake in Express to Golden Gate Capital Partners. When the sale was finalized, in July 2007, Golden Gate's stake in the company was 75% for approximately $550 Million, instead of the announced 67%.

Through its unit, Mac Acquisition LLC, in 2008, the firm acquired a majority stake in the Romano's Macaroni Grill restaurant chain for $131 Million. In October 2017, Mac Acquisition LLC filed for Chapter 11 bankruptcy protection, from which it was able to emerge in February 2018.

In June 2009, the company announced the purchase of the J.Jill brand business from Talbots. In April 2011, the Bahrain-based private equity firm Arcapita bought Jill Acquisitions from Golden Gate.

In 2011, it acquired California Pizza Kitchen. The company declared bankruptcy in July 2020, seeking to reduce its debt load and close locations, during the midst of the COVID-19 pandemic.

On October 9, 2012, Wolverine World Wide, Golden Gate Capital and Blum Capital acquired Collective Brands.

On July 28, 2014, Golden Gate completed the purchase of Red Lobster from Darden Restaurants, for $2.1 billion. The firm has been criticized for its handling of Red Lobster; Golden Gate was accused of "asset stripping" by selling off Red Lobster's real estate, which Golden Gate in turn kept as profit rather than a reinvestment into the restaurant chain. Red Lobster filed for Chapter 11 bankruptcy in May 2024.

In November 2014, Golden Gate Capital agreed to buy Angus Chemical Co. and its Sterlington plant from Dow Chemical, for $1.215 billion.

In May 2015, the company backed Philip P. Gass and Kostas Cheliotis with $750 million for a reinsurance company. That month, Golden Gate Capital, with Arcapita Bank, also sold its J.Jill retail holdings to TowerBrook.

In September 2016, the company acquired lifestyle clothing brand PacSun, after the retailer completed Chapter 11 bankruptcy.

In January 2017, the company purchased the Bob Evans Restaurants division from Bob Evans Farms, for $565 million. On August 8, 2017, Golden Gate Capital finalized the acquisition of Neustar, Inc., previously NSR, a publicly traded company.

In June 2018, the company announced that it had established a new operating company, PSEB Group. PSEB is composed of two Golden Gate portfolio companies: Eddie Bauer and Pacific Sunwear of California. In July, Golden Gate Capital announced that it had acquired The Learning Experience, one of the nation's largest and fastest-growing academies of early education and child care providers. In November, Golden Gate Capital announced that it had acquired Vector Solutions of Tampa from Providence Equity Partners, for an undisclosed sum.

In September 2019, Golden Gate Capital acquired autism and childhood behavioral health services provider, Invo Holding, LLC, for an undisclosed amount. In November, the firm sold Hillstone Environmental Partners, which it had co-founded in 2015 as a de novo investment, in a partnership with Hillstone CEO and co-founder Jay Parkinson. NGL Energy Partners acquired the Central Delaware Basin water pipeline and disposal infrastructure company for approximately US$600 million.
