= Sugar Ridge, Ohio =

Unincorporated community in Ohio, US

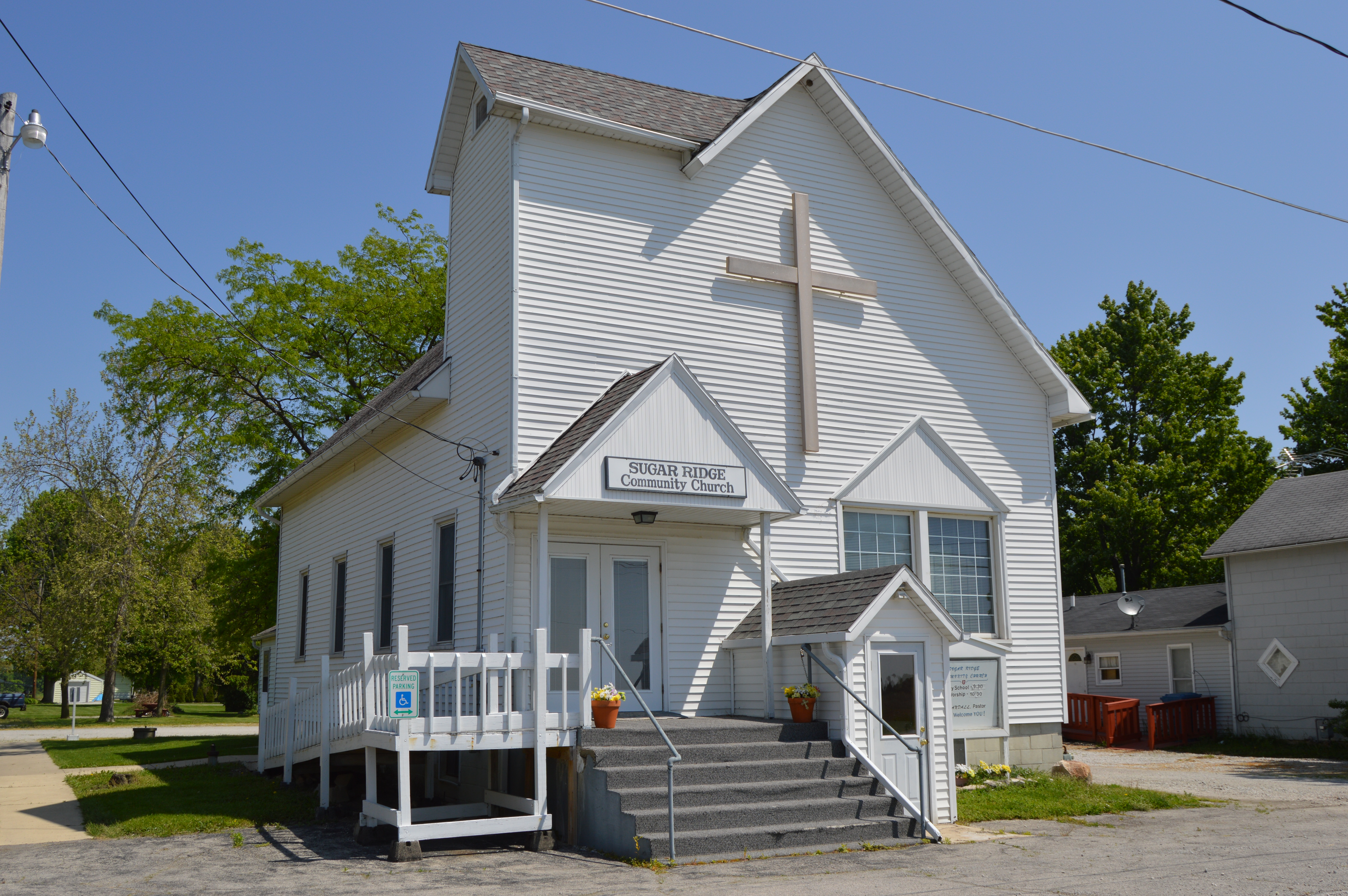
- Sugar Ridge Community Church
- Interactive map of Sugar Ridge, Ohio
- Coordinates: 41°25′44″N 83°37′21″W
- Established: 1882

Sugar Ridge is an unincorporated community in Wood County, Ohio, United States. It lies along Ohio State Route 25, north of Bowling Green and just west of Interstate 75.

== History ==
Sugar Ridge was platted in 1882. A post office called Sugar Ridge was established in 1883, and remained in operation until 1954.

== Notable person ==
Bob Evans, the founder of Bob Evans Restaurants, was born at Sugar Ridge in 1918.
