= Bob Evans Restaurants =

American restaurant chain

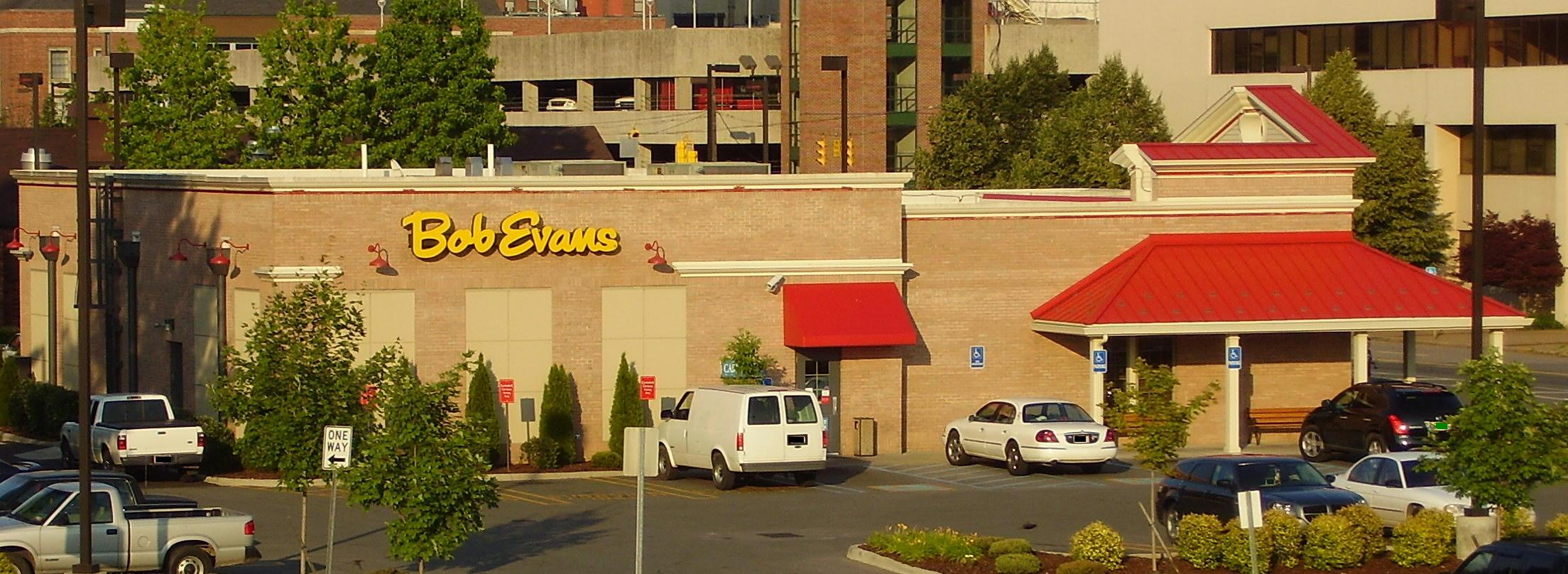
- A Bob Evans in Huntington, West Virginia
- Type: Subsidiary
- Traded as: Nasdaq: BOBE
- Industry: Food
- Genre: Family style
- Founded: 1948; 78 years ago in Gallipolis, Ohio, U.S.
- Founder: Bob Evans
- Fate: Company split in 2017; restaurant division sold to Golden Gate Capital, and BE Farms sold to Post Holdings
- Successor: 4×4 Capital (restaurant); Post Holdings (farms)
- Headquarters: 8111 Smith's Mill Road New Albany, Ohio, U.S.
- Number of locations: 436 (2024)
- Products: Breakfast foods, steaks, chicken, seafood, burgers, sandwiches, soups, salads, desserts, beverages
- Revenue: US$384.94 Million (2017)
- Owner: 4×4 Capital (Restaurant); Post Holdings (Farms)
- Number of employees: 30,625
- Website: bobevans.com

Bob Evans Restaurants is an American chain of family style restaurants based in New Albany, Ohio, and owned by Golden Gate Capital until 2026 when 4×4 Capital bought it. After its founding in 1948 by Bob Evans (1918–2007), the restaurant chain evolved into a company with the corporate brand name "Bob Evans Farms, Inc." (BEF), and eventually established a separate food division to handle the sale of its products in other markets.

The company made several major acquisitions, including Owens Country Sausage in 1987, and was split in January 2017 with the sale of its restaurant division to an affiliate of Golden Gate Capital. BEF Foods remained independently owned until September 2017 when it was sold to Post Holdings.

As of April 2024, the company operates 436 locations in Delaware, Florida, Illinois, Indiana, Kansas, Kentucky, Maryland, Michigan, Missouri, New Jersey, New York, North Carolina, Ohio, Pennsylvania, South Carolina, Tennessee, Virginia, and West Virginia. The locations are all corporate owned (none of them are franchised).

The restaurants feature a country-living theme, and most locations sell baked goods, snacks, and small gift items. The company formerly offered pork products and refrigerated side dishes in retail grocery and food service markets. The distribution of these products, sold under the Bob Evans and Owens Country Sausage brand names, was independent of the restaurant division.

== History ==
=== Beginning and consolidation ===
Bob Evans Restaurants was founded in 1948 by Bob Evans, when he began processing and packaging sausage for his small diner located in Gallipolis, Ohio. Early operations were based at his farm in Rio Grande. As the reputation of his sausage grew, so did the number of guests who visited his farm to buy it in bulk. Friends and family partnered together to establish Bob Evans Farms, Inc., in 1953. The increased traffic led him to build the first company restaurant at the farm in 1962 that was named "The Sausage Shop".

The construction of additional Bob Evans restaurants began some years later. By the mid-1970s, there were 20 locations—all of them still in Ohio—including sites in Cleveland, Columbus, Cincinnati, Dayton, and smaller markets. By 1980, there were 59 restaurants in seven states. and by 1992 Bob Evans owned and operated 261 restaurants in 16 states: Ohio, Indiana, Illinois, Kentucky, Florida, Georgia, Tennessee, Pennsylvania, Michigan, West Virginia, South Carolina, Missouri, Maryland, New York, Virginia and Texas, with food products retailed in 26 states and the District of Columbia.

After encountering a capacity problem fulfilling large orders, Bob Evans contracted with his cousin Tim Evans of the Evans Packing Company to package Bob Evans Sausage products. Another relative, Dan Evans, served as CEO until his retirement in 2000.

The company acquired Texas-based Owens Country Sausage in 1987. Owing to trademark issues, the company branded its otherwise identical restaurants in Texas as Owens Restaurants. By January 2006, all Owens restaurants had been closed.

The company operated a Mexican-themed restaurant called Cantina del Rio in the mid-1990s, a move that founder Bob Evans called "a disaster" in 2003.

The Evans family controlled daily operations of the company until 2000, when Dan Evans retired as CEO. After this, Stewart K. Owens (a former officer of the Owens Country Sausage company and later president of BOBE) assumed control of Bob Evans Farms Inc. as CEO. In 2001, he became chairman of the board. Company profits faltered under Owens' tenure. In August 2005, after corporate profits had dropped in eight of the previous nine quarters, Owens announced his resignation. After operating for several months under interim CEO Larry Corbin, the company hired Steven Davis, former president of Long John Silver's, as CEO in May 2006.

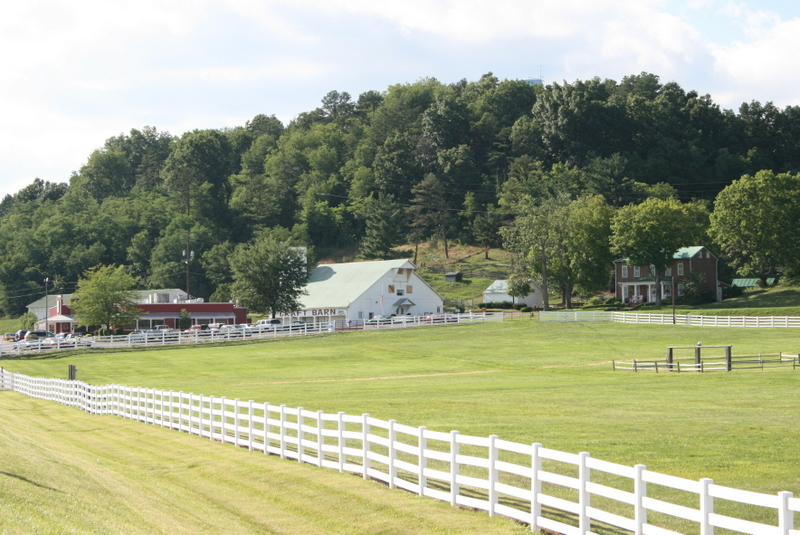
The Bob Evans Farm in Rio Grande, Ohio, with a Bob Evans restaurant (left), pictured in 2007

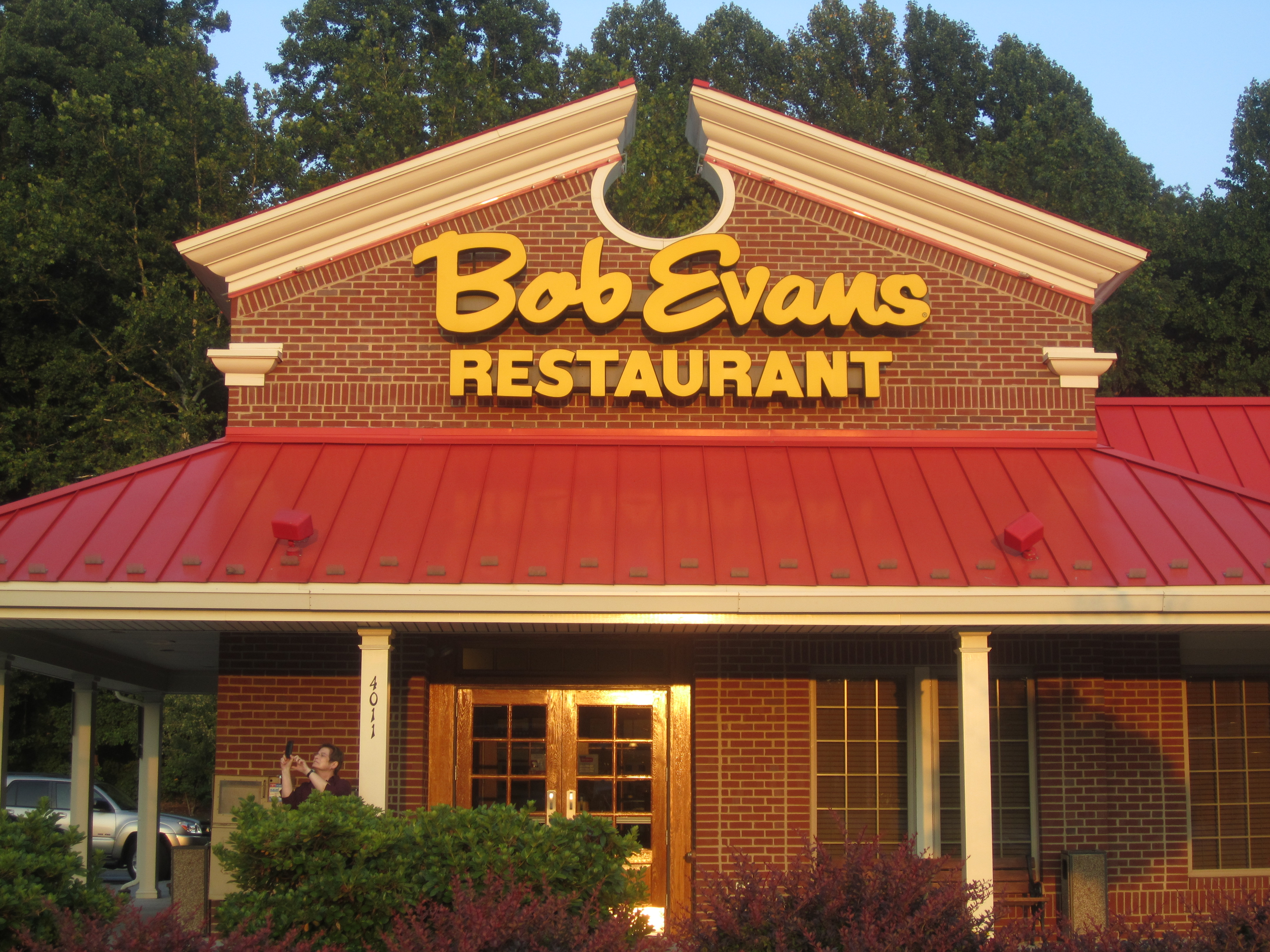
Bob Evans outlet in Lynchburg, Virginia, 2011 (closed in October 2017)

In July 2004, Bob Evans Farms purchased the California-based Mimi's Cafe restaurant chain (operating under SWH Corporation) for $182 million. Mimi's Cafe had 144 locations throughout the U.S. at the time. They featured casual dining and American food with a French emphasis and decorative elements. Bob Evans Farms sold Mimi's Cafe to the U.S. branch of Groupe Le Duff in 2013.

In an effort to update the company's image, Bob Evans debuted a new prototype design at their restaurant location in Xenia, Ohio, on August 17, 2009. The new look included flat-screen televisions, free Wi-Fi, curbside carryout services, and redesigned uniforms for staff. Its architecture and interior design drew inspiration from the Bob Evans family farm in southern Ohio in a way that the company called a "contemporary and relevant twist".

CEO Steven Davis resigned in December 2014.

In December 2015, the chain announced its intention to sell 145 properties to Mesirow Financial Holdings Inc. for $165–175 million.

=== Separation from and dissolution of Bob Evans Farms ===
On January 24, 2017, Bob Evans Farms announced the sale of its restaurants business unit to the private equity company Golden Gate Capital (owners of Red Lobster and California Pizza Kitchen) for US$565 million plus the assumption of up to US$50 million in liabilities. In addition to the restaurants, Golden Gate Capital also took ownership of the Bob Evans Farm in Bidwell, Ohio, near Rio Grande. Once the sale was finalized, Bob Evans Farms CEO Saed Mohseni moved to Golden Gate Capital to serve as president of the Bob Evans restaurant division. BEF Foods President Mike Townsley became president and CEO of the new Bob Evans Farms, which remains a public company focusing on grocery products such as breakfast sausage and refrigerated side dishes. Net proceeds from the sale to Bob Evans Farms was expected to be between $475 million and $485 million.

On the same day, Bob Evans Farms entered into an agreement to acquire the Pineland Farms Potato Co. of Mars Hill, Maine, for US$115 million. Pineland Farms is a value-added potato processor, including a 900-acre (360 ha) potato farm, serving the retail and food service markets. They also operate a cheese-processing business. Both the sale of the restaurant division to Golden Gate Capital and the purchase of Pineland Farms Potato Company closed on March 1, 2017.

On September 19, 2017, Bob Evans Farms announced that it would be acquired by Post Holdings. Post Holdings also announced that upon completion of the acquisition, they would combine their existing Michael Foods refrigerated retail business with that of Bob Evans Farms. This unit would initially operate under the Bob Evans Farms name (before eventually being changed to Post Refrigerated Retail) and would be led by the then-current Bob Evans Farms president and CEO, Mike Townsley. Bob Evans Farms foodservice business would be moved to Michael Foods, and led by division president Jim Dwyer. The sale of Bob Evans Farms to Post Holdings closed on January 12, 2018, when Bob Evans Farms stock was delisted from the NASDAQ Global Select Market, and the company ceased to exist as an independent organization.

=== 2026-present ===
Golden Gate Capital sold the restaurant division in February 2026 to 4×4 Capital for an undisclosed amount.

== See also ==
- List of casual dining restaurant chains
- List of restaurant chains in the United States
