= 1902 DePauw football team =

American college football season

1902 DePauw football
- Conference: Independent
- Record: 5–5
- Head coach: James R. Henry (1st season)
- Captain: Pearson (fullback)

1902 Midwestern college football independents records
	Conf.			Overall
Team	W	L	T	W		L		T
Nebraska		–		9	–	0	–	0
South Dakota		–		9	–	0	–	0
North Dakota Agricultural		–		4	–	0	–	0
Central Michigan		–		4	–	0	–	0
Ohio Medical		–		9	–	1	–	0
Marquette		–		6	–	1	–	1
Knox		–		9	–	2	–	0
Northern Illinois State		–		5	–	1	–	1
Haskell		–		8	–	2	–	1
Notre Dame		–		6	–	2	–	1
Drake		–		5	–	2	–	1
Lincoln (MO)		–		2	–	1	–	0
Mount Union		–		6	–	3	–	0
Iowa State		–		6	–	3	–	1
Carthage		–		2	–	1	–	1
Cincinnati		–		4	–	2	–	2
Missouri		–		5	–	3	–	0
Miami (OH)		–		5	–	3	–	1
Kansas		–		6	–	4	–	0
South Dakota Agricultural		–		3	–	2	–	0
Fairmount		–		4	–	3	–	1
Detroit College		–		3	–	3	–	0
Lake Forest		–		4	–	4	–	1
Lincoln (MO)		–		1	–	1	–	0
Western Illinois		–		2	–	2	–	0
Wittenberg		–		3	–	4	–	2
Washburn		–		3	–	4	–	0
Doane		–		2	–	3	–	0
Heidelberg		–		3	–	5	–	1
Wabash		–		2	–	4	–	2
Buchtel		–		2	–	5	–	0
Washington University		–		2	–	6	–	1
Butler		–		1	–	3	–	0
Kansas State		–		2	–	6	–	0
Michigan State Normal		–		1	–	5	–	1
Iowa State Normal		–		1	–	6	–	1
Ohio		–		0	–	5	–	1

The 1902 DePauw football team was an American football team that represented DePauw University as an independent during the 1902 college football season. Led by James R. Henry in his first and only season as head coach, DePauw compiled a record of 5–5.

== Schedule ==
Date	Opponent	Site	Result	Source
September 22	DePauw Alumni	Greencastle, IN	L 7–12	
September 27	Shortridge High School	Greencastle, IN	W 16–0	
October 4	Purdue	Stuart Field; West Lafayette, IN	L 0–40	
October 13	Rose Polytechnic	Greencastle, IN	W 62–0	
October 18	Indiana	Jordan Field; Bloomington, IN	L 5–16	
October 25	Michigan Agricultural	College Field; East Lansing, MI	W 17–12	
November 1	Ohio Wesleyan		L 6–24	
November 5	Indianapolis	Greencastle, IN	W 32–0	
November 8	Rose Polytechnic	Terre Haute, IN	W 42–0	
November 22	at Notre Dame	Cartier Field; Notre Dame, IN	L 0–22	
