= 1902 Western Conference football season =

- Sport: Football
- Number of teams: 9
- Champion: Michigan

Football seasons
- ← 1901 1903 →

1902 Western Conference football standings
	Conf.					Overall
Team	W		L		T	W		L		T
Michigan $	5	–	0	–	0	11	–	0	–	0
Chicago	5	–	1	–	0	11	–	1	–	0
Minnesota	3	–	1	–	0	9	–	2	–	1
Illinois	4	–	2	–	0	10	–	2	–	1
Purdue	2	–	2	–	0	7	–	2	–	1
Wisconsin	1	–	3	–	0	6	–	3	–	0
Iowa	0	–	3	–	0	5	–	4	–	0
Northwestern	0	–	4	–	0	6	–	6	–	0
Indiana	0	–	4	–	0	3	–	5	–	1
$ – Conference champion

The 1902 Western Conference football season was the seventh season of college football played by the member schools of the Western Conference (later known as the Big Ten Conference) and was a part of the 1902 college football season.

The conference champion for 1902 was Michigan coached by Fielding H. Yost. The Wolverines compiled a perfect 11–0 record, outscored their opponents by a combined score of 644 to 12, and became known as the second of Yost's "Point-a-Minute" teams. The 1902 Michigan Wolverines have also been recognized as the national champions by the Billingsley Report, Helms Athletic Foundation, Houlgate System, and National Championship Foundation, and as co-national champions by Parke H. Davis. Right halfback Albert E. Herrnstein was Michigan's leading scorer with 135 points on 27 touchdowns (valued at five points under 1902 rules).

== Season overview ==
=== Results and team statistics ===
Conf. Rank	Team	Head coach	Overall record	Conf. record	PPG	PAG
1	Michigan	Fielding H. Yost	11–0	5–0	58.5	1.1
2	Chicago	Amos A. Stagg	14–1	5–1	19.7	2.1
3	Minnesota	Henry L. Williams	9-2-1	3-1	27.9	2.8
4	Illinois	Edgar Holt	10–2–1	4–2	29.2	3.4
5	Purdue	Charles Best	7–2–1	2–2	31.5	6.8
6	Wisconsin	Philip King	6–3	1–3	25.3	4.3
7	Iowa	Alden Knipe	5–4	0–3	13.4	26.4
8 (tie)	Northwestern	Charles Hollister	6–6	0–4	6.9	9.8
8 (tie)	Indiana	James H. Horne	3–5–1	0–4	10.4	23.0

Key

PPG = Average of points scored per game
PAG = Average of points allowed per game

=== Bowl games ===
No Western Conference schools participated in any bowl games during the 1902 season.

== Awards and honors ==
=== All-Western players ===
Twelve players, six of them from Michigan, were chosen as first-team players on at least three of the 1902 All-Western college football teams named by the following six selectors: Chicago Tribune (CT), Chicago Daily News (CDN) selected by Fred Hayner, Chicago Record-Herald (CRH) selected by Carl M. Green, Milwaukee Evening Wisconsin (MEW), The Minneapolis Journal (MJ), and Woodruff (W). (Players unanimously chosen by all six selectors are listed in bold.)

- Allen Abbott, end, Wisconsin (CT, CDN, CRH, MEW, W)
- **Joe Maddock**, tackle, Michigan (CT, CDN, CRH, MEW, MJ, W)
- E. W. Farr, tackle, Chicago (CT, CDN, CRH)
- **John G. Flynn**, guard, Minnesota (CT, CDN, CRH, MEW, MJ, W)
- Dan McGugin, guard, Michigan (CRH, MEW, W)
- A. C. Ellsworth, center, Chicago (CT, CRH, MJ)
- Emil Skow, center, Wisconsin (CDN, MEW, W)
- **Boss Weeks**, Michigan (CT, CDN, CRH, MEW, MJ, W)
- **Willie Heston**, halfback, Michigan (CT, CDN, CRH, MEW, MJ, W)
- Paul J. Jones, halfback/fullback, Michigan (CT, W, MEW)
- Harry J. Van Valkenburg, halfback, Minnesota (CRH, MEW, MJ)
- Everett Sweeley, fullback, Michigan (CT, CDN, CRH)

=== All-Americans ===
No Western Conference players were selected as first-team players by Walter Camp or Caspar Whitney for the 1902 College Football All-America Team. Camp and Whitney during this period generally limited their first-team selections to players from the East and the Ivy League in particular. In 1902, all 14 consensus All-Americans came from Eastern universities, and 12 of 14 played in the Ivy League. Yale (Camp's alma mater) had seven players who were designated as consensus All-Americans. The only two consensus All-Americans from schools outside the Ivy League were tackle Paul Bunker and center Robert Boyers, both of whom played for Army.

The dominance of Eastern players led to criticism over the years that the All-America selections were biased against players from the leading Western universities, including Chicago, Michigan, Minnesota, Wisconsin, and Notre Dame.

However, an All-American team selected by The Newark Advocate broke from tradition and named three Michigan players as first-team All-Americans. The three players recognized by The Newark Advocate were: tackle Joseph Maddock, quarterback Boss Weeks, halfback Willie Heston.
