= Charles Hollister =

Charles Hollister may refer to:

- Charles M. Hollister (1867–1923), American football coach and college athletics administrator
- C. Warren Hollister (Charles Warren Hollister, 1930–1997), American historian and medievalist
