= Peter McPherson =

Peter McPherson may refer to:

- M. Peter McPherson (born 1940), American academic and government administrator
- Peter McPherson (American football) (1874–1941), American football player
- Peter McPherson (soccer) (born 1984), Australian soccer player
- Peter McPherson (tennis) (20th century), Australian tennis player, doubles partner of John Hillebrand

== See also ==
- Peter MacPherson (1841–1913), member of the Queensland Legislative Council
