= 1902 Iowa Hawkeyes football team =

American college football season

1902 Iowa Hawkeyes football
- Conference: Western Conference
- Record: 5–4 (0–3 Western)
- Head coach: Alden Knipe (5th season)
- Captain: H. S. Hollenbeck
- Home stadium: Iowa Field

1902 Western Conference football standings
	Conf.					Overall
Team	W		L		T	W		L		T
Michigan $	5	–	0	–	0	11	–	0	–	0
Chicago	5	–	1	–	0	11	–	1	–	0
Minnesota	3	–	1	–	0	9	–	2	–	1
Illinois	4	–	2	–	0	10	–	2	–	1
Purdue	2	–	2	–	0	7	–	2	–	1
Wisconsin	1	–	3	–	0	6	–	3	–	0
Iowa	0	–	3	–	0	5	–	4	–	0
Northwestern	0	–	4	–	0	6	–	6	–	0
Indiana	0	–	4	–	0	3	–	5	–	1
$ – Conference champion

The 1902 Iowa Hawkeyes football team was an American football team that represented the State University of Iowa ("S.U.I."), now commonly known as the University of Iowa, as a member of the Western Conference during the 1902 Western Conference football season. In their fifth and final year under head coach Alden Knipe, the Hawkeyes compiled a 5–4 record (0–3 in conference games), tied for last place in the Western Conference, and were outscored by a total of 238 to 121.

The team played its home games at Iowa Field in Iowa City, Iowa.

== Schedule ==
Date	Opponent	Site	Result	Attendance	Source
October 4	Iowa State Normal*	Iowa Field; Iowa City, IA	W 63–5		
October 11	Drake*	Iowa Field; Iowa City, IA	W 12–0		
October 18	Simpson*	Iowa Field; Iowa City, IA	W 10–0		
October 25	Minnesota	Iowa Field; Iowa City, IA (rivalry)	L 0–34	3,000	
November 1	Iowa State*	Iowa Field; Iowa City, IA (rivalry)	W 12–6		
November 8	at Michigan	Regents Field; Ann Arbor, MI	L 0–107	3,000	
November 15	Washington University*	Iowa Field; Iowa City, IA	W 61–0		
November 20	Missouri*	Iowa Field; Iowa City, IA	L 0–6		
November 27	at Illinois	Illinois Field; Champaign, IL	L 0–80		
*Non-conference game
