= 1902 Northwestern Purple football team =

American college football season

1902 Northwestern Purple football
- Conference: Western Conference
- Record: 6–6 (0–4 Western)
- Head coach: Charles M. Hollister (4th season)
- Captain: Charles Ward
- Home stadium: Sheppard Field

1902 Western Conference football standings
	Conf.					Overall
Team	W		L		T	W		L		T
Michigan $	5	–	0	–	0	11	–	0	–	0
Chicago	5	–	1	–	0	11	–	1	–	0
Minnesota	3	–	1	–	0	9	–	2	–	1
Illinois	4	–	2	–	0	10	–	2	–	1
Purdue	2	–	2	–	0	7	–	2	–	1
Wisconsin	1	–	3	–	0	6	–	3	–	0
Iowa	0	–	3	–	0	5	–	4	–	0
Northwestern	0	–	4	–	0	6	–	6	–	0
Indiana	0	–	4	–	0	3	–	5	–	1
$ – Conference champion

The 1902 Northwestern Purple football team was an American football team that represented Northwestern University during the 1902 Western Conference football season. In its fourth season under head coach Charles M. Hollister, the team compiled a 6–6 record (0–4 against Western Conference opponents), won its first five-game before losing six of seven games, and finished in a tie for last place in the Western Conference.

== Schedule ==
Date	Opponent	Site	Result	Attendance	Source
September 20	Fort Sheridan*	Sheppard Field; Evanston, IL	W 15–0		
September 27	Naperville Athletic Club*	Sheppard Field; Evanston, IL	W 10–5		
October 1	Chicago Dental College*	Sheppard Field; Evanston, IL	W 11–0		
October 4	Lake Forest*	Sheppard Field; Evanston, IL	W 26–0		
October 11	Rush Medical*	Sheppard Field; Evanston, IL	W 11–0		
October 18	at Chicago	Marshall Field; Chicago, IL	L 0–12		
October 25	Knox*	Sheppard Field; Evanston, IL	L 0–15		
October 31	vs. Purdue	West Side Baseball Park; Chicago, IL	L 0–5	3,000	
November 8	at Wisconsin	Randall Field; Madison, WI	L 0–51	1,500	
November 15	Beloit*	Sheppard Field; Evanston, IL	W 10–0		
November 22	vs. Illinois	West Side Baseball Park; Chicago (rivalry)	L 0–17		
November 27	at Nebraska*	Antelope Field; Lincoln, NE	L 0–12		
*Non-conference game
