= Forest Firestone =

American football player and coach (1876–1940)

Biographical details
- Born: July 27, 1876; Akron, Ohio, U.S.
- Died: July 12, 1940 (aged 63); Cambridge, Ohio, U.S.

Playing career
- 1896–1897: Michigan

Coaching career (HC unless noted)
- 1902: Buchtel

Head coaching record
- Overall: 2–5

George Forest Firestone (July 27, 1876 – July 12, 1940) was an American college football player and coach. He served as the head coach at Buchtel College—now known as the University of Akron—for one season in 1902, compiling a record of 2–5. Firestone was born on July 27, 1876, in Akron, Ohio, and died on July 12, 1940, in Cambridge, Ohio.

== Head coaching record ==
Year	Team	Overall	Conference	Standing	Bowl/playoffs
Buchtel (Independent) (1902)
1902	Buchtel	2–5			
Butchel:		2–5			
Total:		2–5			
