= 1900 All-Western college football team =

American all-star college football team

The 1900 All-Western college football team consists of American football players selected to the All-Western teams chosen by various selectors for the 1900 Western Conference football season.

== All-Western selections ==
=== Ends ===
- Beyer Aune, Minnesota (CW)
- Neil Snow, Michigan (CW) (CFHOF)

=== Tackles ===
- Arthur Hale Curtis, Wisconsin (CW)
- Joe Warner, Iowa (CW)

=== Guards ===
- Jerry Riordan, Wisconsin (CW)
- Cyrus E. Dietz, Northwestern (CW)

=== Centers ===
- Leroy Albert Page, Jr., Minnesota (CW)

=== Quarterbacks ===
- Gil Dobie, Minnesota (CW) (CFHOF)

=== Halfbacks ===
- James R. Henry, Chicago (CW)
- Al Larson, Wisconsin (CW)

=== Fullbacks ===
- Warren Cummings Knowlton, Minnesota (CW)

== Key ==
- CW = Caspar Whitney in Outing magazine

CFHOF = College Football Hall of Fame

== See also ==
- 1900 College Football All-America Team
