= 1902 Indiana Hoosiers football team =

American college football season

1902 Indiana Hoosiers football
- Conference: Western Conference
- Record: 3–5–1 (0–4 Western)
- Head coach: James H. Horne (5th season)
- Captain: Walter Railsback
- Home stadium: Jordan Field

1902 Western Conference football standings
	Conf.					Overall
Team	W		L		T	W		L		T
Michigan $	5	–	0	–	0	11	–	0	–	0
Chicago	5	–	1	–	0	11	–	1	–	0
Minnesota	3	–	1	–	0	9	–	2	–	1
Illinois	4	–	2	–	0	10	–	2	–	1
Purdue	2	–	2	–	0	7	–	2	–	1
Wisconsin	1	–	3	–	0	6	–	3	–	0
Iowa	0	–	3	–	0	5	–	4	–	0
Northwestern	0	–	4	–	0	6	–	6	–	0
Indiana	0	–	4	–	0	3	–	5	–	1
$ – Conference champion

The 1902 Indiana Hoosiers football team was an American football team that represented Indiana University Bloomington during the 1902 Western Conference football season. In their fifth season under head coach James H. Horne, the Hoosiers compiled a 3–5–1 record and were outscored by their opponents by a combined total of 207 to 94.

== Schedule ==
Date	Opponent	Site	Result	Attendance	Source
October 4	Wabash*	Jordan Field; Bloomington, IN	W 34–0		
October 11	at Michigan	Regents Field; Ann Arbor, MI	L 0–60		
October 18	DePauw*	Jordan Field; Bloomington, IN	W 16–5		
October 25	Notre Dame*	Jordan Field; Bloomington, IN	L 5–11		
November 6	at Illinois	Illinois Field; Champaign, IL (rivalry)	L 0–47		
November 8	at Chicago	Marshall Field; Chicago, IL	L 0–39	1,000	
November 15	at Purdue	Stuart Field; West Lafayette, IN	L 0–39		
November 22	Vincennes*	Jordan Field; Bloomington, IN	W 33–0		
November 27	at Ohio State	Ohio Field; Columbus, OH	T 6–6		
*Non-conference game

== Personnel ==
=== Roster ===
Name	Position	Year
Walter Railsback	Left Tackle	
Zora G. Clevenger	Left Halfback	
Hillman		
Schmidt		
Shackleton		
Artman		
Jones	Right End	
Johnson	Quarterback	
Knight	Full Back	
Banks	Right Tackle	
Littell		
Stoddard		
Bryan		
Magaw		
Driesbach		
Coval	Right Halfback	
Kent		
Markle	Center	
Ross		
Mendenhall		
Lockridge	Left End	
O'Donnell	Left Guard	
O'Donnell	Right Guard	

=== Staffing ===
- James H. Horne, coach
