= 1902 Haskell Indians football team =

American college football season

1902 Haskell Indians football
- Conference: Independent
- Record: 8–2–1
- Head coach: John H. Outland (1st season)

1902 Midwestern college football independents records
	Conf.			Overall
Team	W	L	T	W		L		T
Nebraska		–		9	–	0	–	0
South Dakota		–		9	–	0	–	0
North Dakota Agricultural		–		4	–	0	–	0
Central Michigan		–		4	–	0	–	0
Ohio Medical		–		9	–	1	–	0
Marquette		–		6	–	1	–	1
Knox		–		9	–	2	–	0
Northern Illinois State		–		5	–	1	–	1
Haskell		–		8	–	2	–	1
Notre Dame		–		6	–	2	–	1
Drake		–		5	–	2	–	1
Lincoln (MO)		–		2	–	1	–	0
Mount Union		–		6	–	3	–	0
Iowa State		–		6	–	3	–	1
Carthage		–		2	–	1	–	1
Cincinnati		–		4	–	2	–	2
Missouri		–		5	–	3	–	0
Miami (OH)		–		5	–	3	–	1
Kansas		–		6	–	4	–	0
South Dakota Agricultural		–		3	–	2	–	0
Fairmount		–		4	–	3	–	1
Detroit College		–		3	–	3	–	0
Lake Forest		–		4	–	4	–	1
Lincoln (MO)		–		1	–	1	–	0
Western Illinois		–		2	–	2	–	0
Wittenberg		–		3	–	4	–	2
Washburn		–		3	–	4	–	0
Doane		–		2	–	3	–	0
Heidelberg		–		3	–	5	–	1
Wabash		–		2	–	4	–	2
Buchtel		–		2	–	5	–	0
Washington University		–		2	–	6	–	1
Butler		–		1	–	3	–	0
Kansas State		–		2	–	6	–	0
Michigan State Normal		–		1	–	5	–	1
Iowa State Normal		–		1	–	6	–	1
Ohio		–		0	–	5	–	1

The 1902 Haskell Indians football team was an American football team that represented the Haskell Indian Institute (now known as Haskell Indian Nations University) as an independent during the 1902 college football season. Led by first-year head coach John H. Outland, Haskell compiled an 8–2–1 record and outscored opponents by a total of 203 to 79. The team's victories included shutouts against Missouri (40–0), Texas (12–0), and Washington University (18–0); its losses were to Illinois (24–10) and Nebraska (28–0).

Outland was hired as Haskell's coach in February 1902.

== Schedule ==
Date	Time	Opponent	Site	Result	Source
September 20		at Kirksville Osteopaths	Kirksville, MO	W 6–5	
September 27		Washburn	Lawrence, KS	W 29–0	
October 8		at Illinois	Illinois Field; Champaign, IL	L 10–24	
October 18	3:00 p.m.	vs. Missouri	Exposition Park; Kansas City, MO	W 40–0	
October 25		at Washburn	Topeka, KS	W 41–5	
November 1		at Nebraska	Antelope Field; Lincoln, NE	L 0–28	
November 3		at Creighton	Omaha, NE	W 17–6	
November 8		at Texas	Varsity Athletic Field; Austin, TX	W 12–0	
November 15		at Kansas	McCook Field; Lawrence, KS	W 24–5	
November 22		Ottawa	Lawrence, KS	T 6–6	
November 27	2:45 p.m.	at Washington University	League Park; St. Louis, MO	W 18–0	
