= 1902 Kansas Jayhawks football team =

American college football season

1902 Kansas Jayhawks football
- Conference: Independent
- Record: 6–4
- Head coach: Arthur Hale Curtis (1st season)
- Captain: W. D. Vincent
- Home stadium: McCook Field

1902 Midwestern college football independents records
	Conf.			Overall
Team	W	L	T	W		L		T
Nebraska		–		9	–	0	–	0
South Dakota		–		9	–	0	–	0
North Dakota Agricultural		–		4	–	0	–	0
Central Michigan		–		4	–	0	–	0
Ohio Medical		–		9	–	1	–	0
Marquette		–		6	–	1	–	1
Knox		–		9	–	2	–	0
Northern Illinois State		–		5	–	1	–	1
Haskell		–		8	–	2	–	1
Notre Dame		–		6	–	2	–	1
Drake		–		5	–	2	–	1
Lincoln (MO)		–		2	–	1	–	0
Mount Union		–		6	–	3	–	0
Iowa State		–		6	–	3	–	1
Carthage		–		2	–	1	–	1
Cincinnati		–		4	–	2	–	2
Missouri		–		5	–	3	–	0
Miami (OH)		–		5	–	3	–	1
Kansas		–		6	–	4	–	0
South Dakota Agricultural		–		3	–	2	–	0
Fairmount		–		4	–	3	–	1
Detroit College		–		3	–	3	–	0
Lake Forest		–		4	–	4	–	1
Lincoln (MO)		–		1	–	1	–	0
Western Illinois		–		2	–	2	–	0
Wittenberg		–		3	–	4	–	2
Washburn		–		3	–	4	–	0
Doane		–		2	–	3	–	0
Heidelberg		–		3	–	5	–	1
Wabash		–		2	–	4	–	2
Buchtel		–		2	–	5	–	0
Washington University		–		2	–	6	–	1
Butler		–		1	–	3	–	0
Kansas State		–		2	–	6	–	0
Michigan State Normal		–		1	–	5	–	1
Iowa State Normal		–		1	–	6	–	1
Ohio		–		0	–	5	–	1

The 1902 Kansas Jayhawks football team was an American football team that represented the University of Kansas as an independent during the 1902 college football season. In their first and only season under head coach Arthur Hale Curtis, the Jayhawks compiled a 6–4 record and outscored opponents by a total of 108 to 93. The Jayhawks played home games at McCook Field in Lawrence, Kansas. W. D. Vincent was the team captain. They played the first game in the Sunflower Showdown against Kansas State on October 4, winning by a 16–0 score.

== Schedule ==
Date	Time	Opponent	Site	Result	Attendance	Source
September 29		Fairmount	McCook Field; Lawrence, KS	W 6–0		
October 7		Kansas State	McCook Field; Lawrence, KS (rivalry)	W 16–0		
October 11		Washburn	McCook Field; Lawrence, KS	W 34–0		
October 18		Kansas City Medics	McCook Field; Lawrence, KS	W 13–0		
October 25		at Wisconsin	Randall Field; Madison, WI	L 0–38		
October 29		at Knox	Willard Field; Galesburg, IL	L 0–5		
November 8		at Nebraska	Antelope Field; Lincoln, NE (rivalry)	L 0–16	2,000	
November 15		Haskell	McCook Field; Lawrence, KS	L 5–24		
November 20		at Kansas State Normal	Mitway Field; Emporia, KS	W 17–5		
November 27	2:30 p.m.	vs. Missouri	Sportsman's Park; Kansas, MO (rivalry)	W 17–5	10,000	
