= 1902 Illinois Fighting Illini football team =

American college football season

1902 Illinois Fighting Illini football
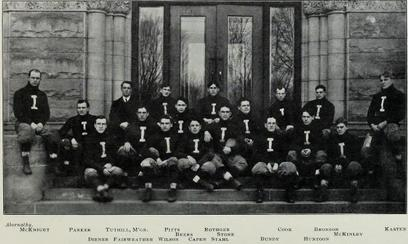
- Conference: Western Conference
- Record: 10–2–1 (4–2 Western)
- Head coach: Edgar Holt (2nd season)
- Captain: Jake Stahl
- Home stadium: Illinois Field

1902 Western Conference football standings
	Conf.					Overall
Team	W		L		T	W		L		T
Michigan $	5	–	0	–	0	11	–	0	–	0
Chicago	5	–	1	–	0	11	–	1	–	0
Minnesota	3	–	1	–	0	9	–	2	–	1
Illinois	4	–	2	–	0	10	–	2	–	1
Purdue	2	–	2	–	0	7	–	2	–	1
Wisconsin	1	–	3	–	0	6	–	3	–	0
Iowa	0	–	3	–	0	5	–	4	–	0
Northwestern	0	–	4	–	0	6	–	6	–	0
Indiana	0	–	4	–	0	3	–	5	–	1
$ – Conference champion

The 1902 Illinois Fighting Illini football team was an American football team that represented the University of Illinois during the 1902 Western Conference football season. In their second season under head coach Edgar Holt, the Illini compiled a 10 wins, 2 losses and 1 draws record and finished in 4th place in the Western Conference. Tackle Jake Stahl was the team captain.

== Schedule ==
Date	Opponent	Site	Result	Attendance	Source
September 20	North Division High School	Illinois Field; Champaign, IL	W 34–6		
September 27	Englewood High School	Illinois Field; Champaign, IL	W 45–0		
October 1	Kirksville Osteopaths	Illinois Field; Champaign, IL	W 22–0		
October 4	Monmouth (IL)	Illinois Field; Champaign, IL	W 33–0		
October 8	Haskell	Illinois Field; Champaign, IL	W 24–10		
October 11	Washington University	Illinois Field; Champaign, IL	W 44–0		
October 18	Purdue	Illinois Field; Champaign, IL (rivalry)	W 29–5		
October 25	at Chicago	Marshall Field; Chicago, IL	L 0–6		
November 1	Indiana	Illinois Field; Champaign, IL (rivalry)	W 47–0		
November 8	at Minnesota	Northrop Field; Minneapolis, MN	L 5–17	8,000	
November 15	at Ohio State	Ohio Field; Columbus, OH (rivalry)	T 0–0		
November 22	vs. Northwestern	West Side Baseball Park; Chicago, IL (rivalry)	W 17–0		
November 27	Iowa	Illinois Field; Champaign, IL	W 80–0		
