= 1902 Ohio State Buckeyes football team =

American college football season

1902 Ohio State Buckeyes football
- Conference: Ohio Athletic Conference
- Record: 6–2–2 (2–1 OAC)
- Head coach: Perry Hale (1st season)
- Home stadium: Ohio Field

1902 Ohio Athletic Conference football standings
	Conf.					Overall
Team	W		L		T	W		L		T
Case $	5	–	0	–	0	6	–	3	–	0
Ohio State	2	–	1	–	0	6	–	2	–	2
Ohio Wesleyan	2	–	2	–	0	7	–	3	–	0
Oberlin	1	–	2	–	0	4	–	4	–	0
Kenyon	1	–	3	–	0	2	–	4	–	2
Western Reserve	0	–	3	–	0	3	–	6	–	0
$ – Conference champion

The 1902 Ohio State Buckeyes football team was an American football team that represented Ohio State University during the 1902 college football season. The Buckeyes compiled a 6–2–2 record and outscored their opponents by a combined total of 172 to 136 in their first season under head coach Perry Hale.

== Schedule ==
Date	Opponent	Site	Result
September 27	Otterbein*	Ohio Field; Columbus, OH	W 5–0
October 4	Ohio*	Ohio Field; Columbus, OH	W 17–0
October 11	West Virginia*	Ohio Field; Columbus, OH	W 30–0
October 18	Marietta*	Ohio Field; Columbus, OH	W 34–0
October 25	at Michigan*	Regents Field; Ann Arbor, MI (rivalry)	L 0–86
November 1	Kenyon	Ohio Field; Columbus, OH	W 51–5
November 8	Case	Ohio Field; Columbus, OH	L 12–23
November 15	Illinois*	Ohio Field; Columbus, OH (rivalry)	T 0–0
November 22	at Ohio Wesleyan	Delaware, OH	W 17–16
November 27	Indiana*	Ohio Field; Columbus, OH	T 6–6
*Non-conference game
