= 1902 Chicago Maroons football team =

American college football season

1902 Chicago Maroons football
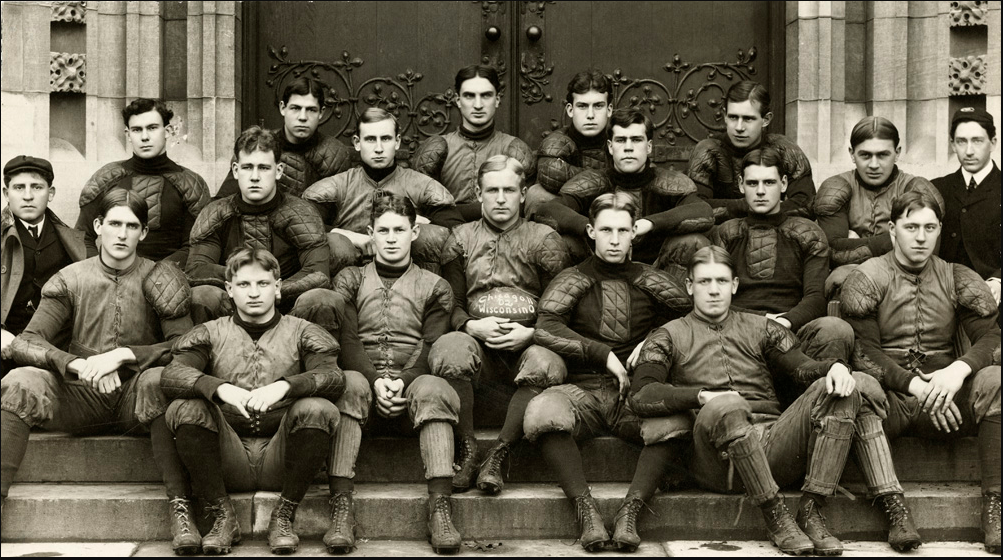
- Conference: Western Conference
- Record: 14–1 (5–1 Western)
- Head coach: Amos Alonzo Stagg (11th season)
- Captain: James M. Sheldon
- Home stadium: Marshall Field

1902 Western Conference football standings
	Conf.					Overall
Team	W		L		T	W		L		T
Michigan $	5	–	0	–	0	11	–	0	–	0
Chicago	5	–	1	–	0	11	–	1	–	0
Minnesota	3	–	1	–	0	9	–	2	–	1
Illinois	4	–	2	–	0	10	–	2	–	1
Purdue	2	–	2	–	0	7	–	2	–	1
Wisconsin	1	–	3	–	0	6	–	3	–	0
Iowa	0	–	3	–	0	5	–	4	–	0
Northwestern	0	–	4	–	0	6	–	6	–	0
Indiana	0	–	4	–	0	3	–	5	–	1
$ – Conference champion

The 1902 Chicago Maroons football team was an American football team that represented the University of Chicago as a member of the Western Conference (later commonly known as the Big Ten Conference) during the 1902 Western Conference football season. In their 11th season under head coach Amos Alonzo Stagg, the Maroons compiled a 14–1 record (5–1 in conference games), shut out 12 opponents, finished in second place in the conference, and outscored all opponents by a total of 297 to 32. The team's only setback was in the team's only road game, a 21–0 loss to national champion Michigan.

Several Chicago players received honors on the 1902 All-Western college football team:

- Center Shorty Ellsworth, tackle E. W. Farr, and guard Herbert Ahlswede received first-team honors from the Chicago Tribune. Ellsworth also received first-team honors from the Chicago Record-Herald and The Minneapolis Journal. Farr received further first-team honors from the Chicago Daily News and Chicago Record-Herald.
- Halfback James M. Sheldon and end Frederick A. Speik received first-team honors from Woodruff.

The team played its eleven home games at Marshall Field (later renamed Stagg Field) on the school's campus in Chicago.

== Schedule ==
Date	Opponent	Site	Result	Attendance	Source
September 13	North Division High*	Marshall Field; Chicago, IL	W 5–0		
September 17	Englewood High School*	Marshall Field; Chicago, IL	W 37–0		
September 20	Lombard*	Marshall Field; Chicago, IL	W 27–6		
September 24	Hyde Park High School*	Marshall Field; Chicago, IL	W 6–5		
September 27	Monmouth (IL)*	Marshall Field; Chicago, IL	W 24–0	700	
October 1	Fort Sheridan*	Marshall Field; Chicago, IL	W 53–0		
October 4	Knox*	Marshall Field; Chicago, IL	W 5–0		
October 8	Cornell (IA)*	Marshall Field; Chicago, IL	W 21–0		
October 11	Purdue	Marshall Field; Chicago, IL (rivalry)	W 33–0		
October 18	Northwestern	Marshall Field; Chicago, IL	W 12–0		
October 25	Illinois	Marshall Field; Chicago, IL	W 6–0		
November 1	Beloit*	Marshall Field; Chicago, IL	W 18–0		
November 8	Indiana	Marshall Field; Chicago, IL	W 39–0	1,000	
November 15	at Michigan	Regents Field; Ann Arbor, MI (rivalry)	L 0–21	14,000	
November 27	Wisconsin	Marshall Field; Chicago, IL	W 11–0	12,000	
*Non-conference game

== Roster ==
Player	Position	Weight
James Milton Sheldon (captain)	left halfback	156
Herbert Frederick Ahlswede	left guard	196
Hugo Francis Bezdek	right halfback	169
Mark Seavey Catlin	right end	177
Alfred Chester Ellsworth	center	186
Ernest Warren Farr	right tackle	200
Gregory Edwin Ivison	left halfback	173
Clarke Saxe Jennison	right halfback	163
John Peter Koehler	left tackle	188
Lee Wilder Maxwell	quarterback	156
Robert Wallace Maxwell	right guard	232
Ernest Earl Perkins	fullback	168
George Edward Schnur	right halfback	156
Frederick Adolph Speik	left end	175
Schuyler Baldwin Terry	left guard	194
Roswell Chester Tripp	left tackle	196
Sherburne Henry Wightman	fullback	170
Hiram Boardman Conibear	trainer

- Head coach: Amos Alonzo Stagg (11th year at Chicago)
