= 1902 Notre Dame football team =

American college football season

1902 Notre Dame football
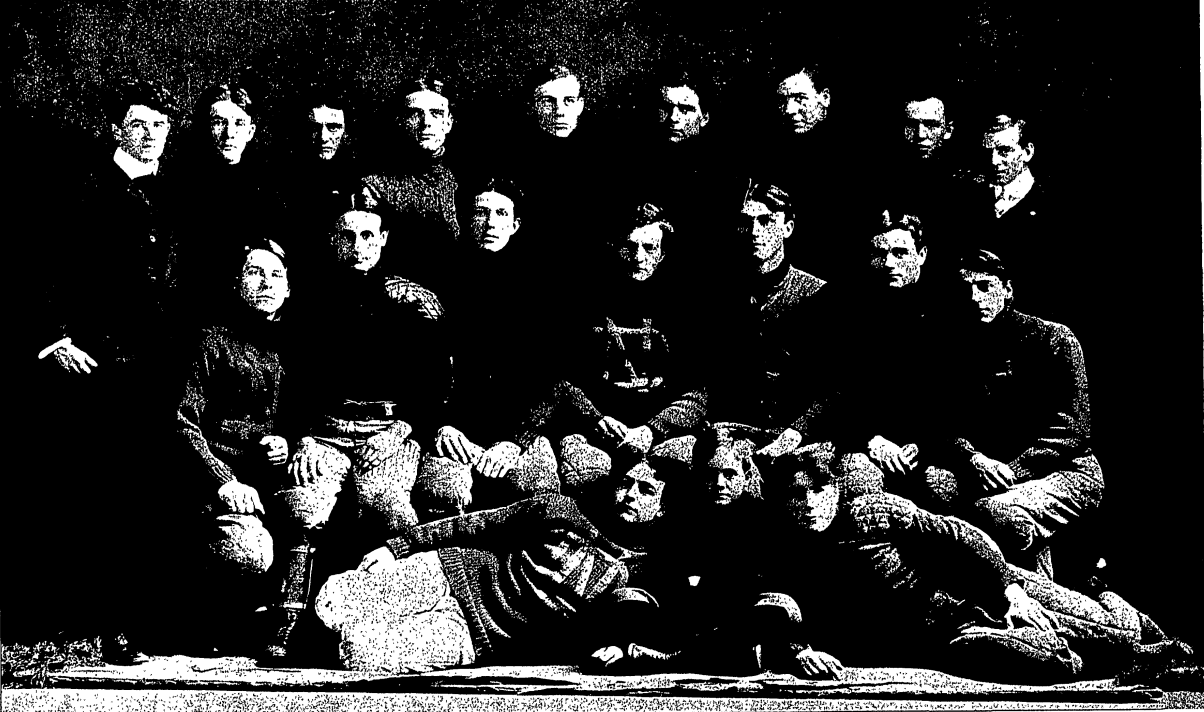

Indiana co-champion
- Conference: Independent
- Record: 6–2–1
- Head coach: James Farragher (1st season)
- Captain: Louis J. Salmon
- Home stadium: Cartier Field

1902 Midwestern college football independents records
	Conf.			Overall
Team	W	L	T	W		L		T
Nebraska		–		9	–	0	–	0
South Dakota		–		9	–	0	–	0
North Dakota Agricultural		–		4	–	0	–	0
Central Michigan		–		4	–	0	–	0
Ohio Medical		–		9	–	1	–	0
Marquette		–		6	–	1	–	1
Knox		–		9	–	2	–	0
Northern Illinois State		–		5	–	1	–	1
Haskell		–		8	–	2	–	1
Notre Dame		–		6	–	2	–	1
Drake		–		5	–	2	–	1
Lincoln (MO)		–		2	–	1	–	0
Mount Union		–		6	–	3	–	0
Iowa State		–		6	–	3	–	1
Carthage		–		2	–	1	–	1
Cincinnati		–		4	–	2	–	2
Missouri		–		5	–	3	–	0
Miami (OH)		–		5	–	3	–	1
Kansas		–		6	–	4	–	0
South Dakota Agricultural		–		3	–	2	–	0
Fairmount		–		4	–	3	–	1
Detroit College		–		3	–	3	–	0
Lake Forest		–		4	–	4	–	1
Lincoln (MO)		–		1	–	1	–	0
Western Illinois		–		2	–	2	–	0
Wittenberg		–		3	–	4	–	2
Washburn		–		3	–	4	–	0
Doane		–		2	–	3	–	0
Heidelberg		–		3	–	5	–	1
Wabash		–		2	–	4	–	2
Buchtel		–		2	–	5	–	0
Washington University		–		2	–	6	–	1
Butler		–		1	–	3	–	0
Kansas State		–		2	–	6	–	0
Michigan State Normal		–		1	–	5	–	1
Iowa State Normal		–		1	–	6	–	1
Ohio		–		0	–	5	–	1

The 1902 Notre Dame football team was an American football team that represented the University of Notre Dame in the 1902 college football season. In its first season with James Farragher as coach, the team compiled a 6–2–1 record and outscored all opponents by a combined total of 203 to 51. Against Indiana, Notre Dame became the first team to defeat the Hoosiers on Jordan Field, a 17-game stretch that started with the field's renaming in 1898. Indiana's full home win streak extended to 23 games.

== Schedule ==
Date	Opponent	Site	Result	Attendance	Source
September 27	Michigan Agricultural	Cartier Field; Notre Dame, IN (rivalry)	W 33–0		
October 11	Lake Forest	Cartier Field; Notre Dame, IN	W 28–0		
October 18	vs. Michigan	Armory Park; Toledo, OH (rivalry)	L 0–23		
October 25	at Indiana	Jordan Field; Bloomington, IN	W 11–5		
November 1	at Ohio Medical	Columbus, OH	W 6–5		
November 8	vs. Knox	Rock Island, IL	L 5–12		
November 15	American Medical	Cartier Field; Notre Dame, IN	W 92–0		
November 22	DePauw	Cartier Field; Notre Dame, IN	W 22–0		
November 27	at Purdue	Stuart Field; West Lafayette, IN (Indiana state championship, rivalry)	T 6–6	4,000	
