= 1902 Minnesota Golden Gophers football team =

American college football season

1902 Minnesota Golden Gophers football
- Conference: Western Conference
- Record: 9–2–1 (3–1 Western)
- Head coach: Henry L. Williams (3rd season)
- Captain: John Flynn
- Home stadium: Northrop Field

1902 Western Conference football standings
	Conf.					Overall
Team	W		L		T	W		L		T
Michigan $	5	–	0	–	0	11	–	0	–	0
Chicago	5	–	1	–	0	11	–	1	–	0
Minnesota	3	–	1	–	0	9	–	2	–	1
Illinois	4	–	2	–	0	10	–	2	–	1
Purdue	2	–	2	–	0	7	–	2	–	1
Wisconsin	1	–	3	–	0	6	–	3	–	0
Iowa	0	–	3	–	0	5	–	4	–	0
Northwestern	0	–	4	–	0	6	–	6	–	0
Indiana	0	–	4	–	0	3	–	5	–	1
$ – Conference champion

The 1902 Minnesota Golden Gophers football team represented the University of Minnesota in the 1902 Western Conference football season. In their third year under head coach Henry L. Williams, the Golden Gophers compiled a 9–2–1 record (3–1 against Western Conference opponents), finished in third place in the conference, shut out nine of their twelve opponents, and outscored all opponents by a combined total of 335 to 34. The Gophers' 102 points against Grinnell on November 1 was the largest point total to that date in the program's history and the first time a Minnesota team scored 100 or more points.

== Schedule ==
Date	Time	Opponent	Site	Result	Attendance
September 22		Saint Paul Central High School*	Northrop Field; Minneapolis, MN	T 0–0	
September 22		Minneapolis Central High*	Northrop Field; Minneapolis, MN	W 28–0	
September 27		Carleton*	Northrop Field; Minneapolis, MN	W 33–0	
October 4		Iowa State*	Northrop Field; Minneapolis, MN	W 16–0	
October 7		Hamline*	Northrop Field; Minneapolis, MN	W 59–0	
October 11		Beloit*	Northrop Field; Minneapolis, MN	W 29–0	
October 18		Nebraska*	Northrop Field; Minneapolis, MN	L 0–6	7,000
October 25		at Iowa	Iowa Field; Iowa City, IA (rivalry)	W 34–0	3,000
November 1		Grinnell*	Northrop Field; Minneapolis, MN	W 102–0	
November 8		Illinois	Northrop Field; Minneapolis, MN	W 17–5	8,000
November 15		Wisconsin	Northrop Field; Minneapolis, MN (rivalry)	W 11–0	1,500
November 27	1:15 p.m.	at Michigan	Ann Arbor, MI (rivalry)	L 6–23	9,000–12,000
*Non-conference game
