= Arthur H. Whittemore =

Biographical details
- Born: March 12, 1878; Alna, Maine, U.S.
- Died: August 24, 1938 (aged 60); Rapid City, South Dakota, U.S.

Playing career

Football
- 1897: Brown
- 1898: Colorado
- 1899–1900: Brown

Baseball
- 1900–1901: Malone (NY)
- Position: Guard (football)

Coaching career (HC unless noted)

Football
- 1901: Middlebury
- 1902–1909: South Dakota
- 1920–1921: South Dakota

Basketball
- 1908–1910: South Dakota

Head coaching record
- Overall: 43–23–7 (football); 15–4 (basketball)

Arthur Henry "Buck" Whittemore (March 12, 1878 – August 24, 1938) was an American minor league baseball player and college football and college basketball player and coach. After playing football at Brown University (1897, 1899–1900) and the University of Colorado (1898), he served as the head football coach at Middlebury College in Middlebury, Vermont in 1901. Whittemore was then the head football coach at the University of South Dakota in Vermillion, South Dakota from 1902 to 1909 and 1920 to 1921.

== Head coaching record ==
=== Football ===
Year	Team	Overall	Conference	Standing	Bowl/playoffs
Middlebury (Independent) (1901)
1901	Middlebury	6–2–1			
Middlebury:		6–2–1			
South Dakota Coyotes (Independent) (1902–1909)
1902	South Dakota	9–0			
1903	South Dakota	2–5			
1904	South Dakota	4–2–2			
1905	South Dakota	4–1–1			
1906	South Dakota	3–2			
1907	South Dakota	2–2–1			
1908	South Dakota	5–1			
1909	South Dakota	2–1–1			
South Dakota Coyotes (Independent) (1920–1921)
1920	South Dakota	4–2–1			
1921	South Dakota	2–5			
South Dakota:		37–21–6			
Total:		43–23–7			
