= 1902 Wisconsin Badgers football team =

American college football season

1902 Wisconsin Badgers football
- Conference: Western Conference
- Record: 6–3 (1–3 Western)
- Head coach: Philip King (7th season)
- Captain: William Juneau
- Home stadium: Randall Field

1902 Western Conference football standings
	Conf.					Overall
Team	W		L		T	W		L		T
Michigan $	5	–	0	–	0	11	–	0	–	0
Chicago	5	–	1	–	0	11	–	1	–	0
Minnesota	3	–	1	–	0	9	–	2	–	1
Illinois	4	–	2	–	0	10	–	2	–	1
Purdue	2	–	2	–	0	7	–	2	–	1
Wisconsin	1	–	3	–	0	6	–	3	–	0
Iowa	0	–	3	–	0	5	–	4	–	0
Northwestern	0	–	4	–	0	6	–	6	–	0
Indiana	0	–	4	–	0	3	–	5	–	1
$ – Conference champion

The 1902 Wisconsin Badgers football team represented the University of Wisconsin in the 1902 Western Conference football season. Led by seventh-year head coach Philip King, the Badgers compiled an overall record of 6–3 with a mark of 1–3 in conference play, placing sixth in the Western Conference. The team's captain was William Juneau.

== Schedule ==
Date	Time	Opponent	Site	Result	Attendance	Source
September 27		Lawrence*	Randall Field; Madison, WI	W 11–0		
October 4		Hyde Park High School*	Randall Field; Madison, WI	W 24–5		
October 11		Lawrence*	Randall Field; Madison, WI	W 52–0		
October 18		vs. Beloit*	Milwaukee, WI	W 52–6		
October 25		Kansas*	Randall Field; Madison, WI	W 38–0		
November 1	2:40 p.m.	vs. Michigan	Marshall Field; Chicago, IL	L 0–6	20,000	
November 8		Northwestern	Randall Field; Madison, WI	W 41–0	1,500	
November 15		at Minnesota	Northrop Field; Minneapolis, MN (rivalry)	L 0–11	1,500	
November 27		at Chicago	Marshall Field; Chicago, IL	L 0–11		
*Non-conference game
