= 1902 Case football team =

American college football season

1902 Case football
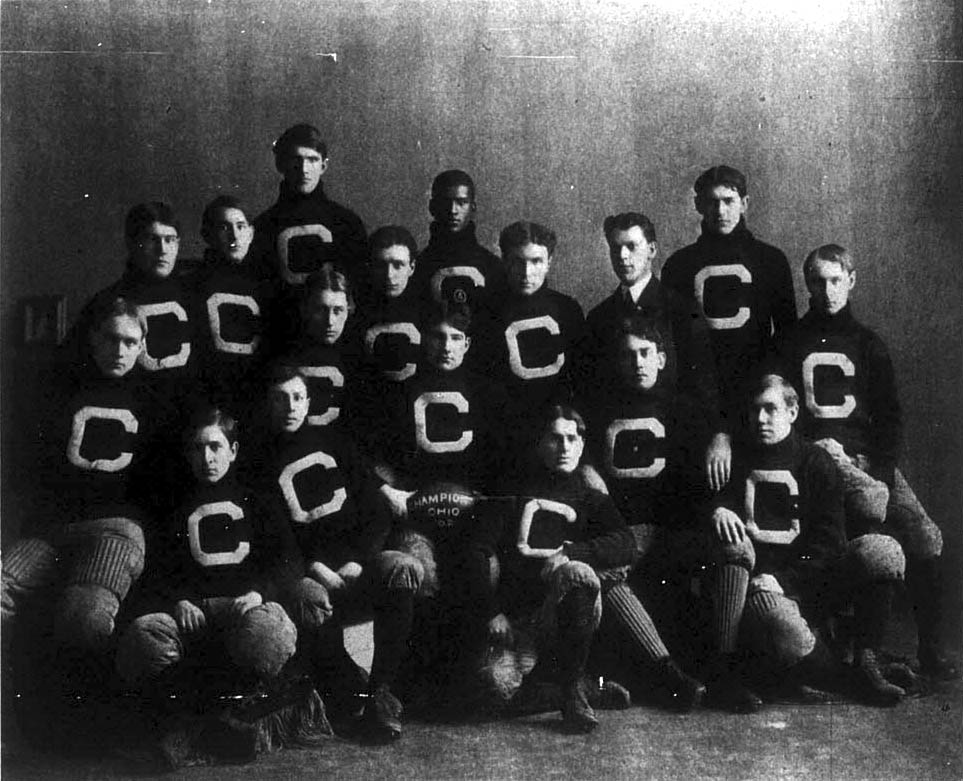

OAC champion
- Conference: Ohio Athletic Conference
- Record: 6–3 (5–0 OAC)
- Head coach: Joseph Wentworth (1st season)
- Captain: Allan F. "Dick" Muter

1902 Ohio Athletic Conference football standings
	Conf.					Overall
Team	W		L		T	W		L		T
Case $	5	–	0	–	0	6	–	3	–	0
Ohio State	2	–	1	–	0	6	–	2	–	2
Ohio Wesleyan	2	–	2	–	0	7	–	3	–	0
Oberlin	1	–	2	–	0	4	–	4	–	0
Kenyon	1	–	3	–	0	2	–	4	–	2
Western Reserve	0	–	3	–	0	3	–	6	–	0
$ – Conference champion

The 1902 Case football team represented the Case School of Applied Science in the American city of Cleveland, Ohio, now a part of Case Western Reserve University, during the 1902 college football season. The team's coach was Joseph Wentworth. Case won its first conference title and first Ohio Athletic Conference title.

Case Football 1902 Champtions of Ohio Trophy located at Case Western Reserve University.

\Wentworth was the highest paid football coach in the United States when hired in 1902 at $3,000.

== Schedule ==
Date	Opponent	Site	Result
October 4	at Michigan*	Regents Field; Ann Arbor, MI	L 6–48
October 11	Ohio Medical*	Cleveland, OH	L 0–15
October 18	Kenyon	Cleveland, OH	W 25–0
October 25	at Purdue*	Stuart Field; West Lafayette, IN	L 0–5
November 1	at Oberlin	Oberlin, OH	W 16–0
November 8	at Ohio State	Ohio Field; Columbus, OH	W 23–12
November 15	Ohio Wesleyan	Cleveland, OH	W 17–6
November 22	Heidelberg*	Cleveland, OH	W 40–0
November 27	vs. Western Reserve	Cleveland, OH	W 20–0
*Non-conference game
