= A. W. Ristine =

American football player and coach (1878–1935)

Biographical details
- Born: May 1, 1878; Fort Dodge, Iowa, U.S.
- Died: December 13, 1935 (aged 57); Roanoke, Virginia, U.S.

Playing career
- 1899–1901: Harvard
- Position: Halfback

Coaching career (HC unless noted)
- 1902–1906: Iowa State

Head coaching record
- Overall: 36–10–1

Accomplishments and honors

Awards
- Second-team All-American (1901)

Albert Welles Ristine (May 1, 1878 – December 13, 1935) was an American college football player and coach. He served as the seventh head football coach at Iowa State University in Ames, Iowa and he held that position for five seasons, from 1902 until 1906. His career coaching record at Iowa State was 36–10–1. This ranks him tied for fourth at Iowa State in total wins and second at Iowa State in winning percentage. He attended Harvard University. He died at a physician's office in Virginia in 1935.

== Head coaching record ==
| Year | Team | Overall | Conference | Standing | Bowl/playoffs |
|---|---|---|---|---|---|
Iowa State Cyclones (Independent) (1902–1906)
| 1902 | Iowa State | 6–3–1 | | | |
| 1903 | Iowa State | 8–1 | | | |
| 1904 | Iowa State | 7–2 | | | |
| 1905 | Iowa State | 6–3 | | | |
| 1906 | Iowa State | 9–1 | | | |
| Iowa State: | | 36–10–1 | | | |
| Total: | | 36–10–1 | | | |
