= 1902 Kansas State Aggies football team =

American college football season

1902 Kansas State Aggies football
- Conference: Independent
- Record: 2–6
- Head coach: Cyrus E. Dietz (1st season)
- Home stadium: Athletic Park

1902 Midwestern college football independents records
	Conf.			Overall
Team	W	L	T	W		L		T
Nebraska		–		9	–	0	–	0
South Dakota		–		9	–	0	–	0
North Dakota Agricultural		–		4	–	0	–	0
Central Michigan		–		4	–	0	–	0
Ohio Medical		–		9	–	1	–	0
Marquette		–		6	–	1	–	1
Knox		–		9	–	2	–	0
Northern Illinois State		–		5	–	1	–	1
Haskell		–		8	–	2	–	1
Notre Dame		–		6	–	2	–	1
Drake		–		5	–	2	–	1
Lincoln (MO)		–		2	–	1	–	0
Mount Union		–		6	–	3	–	0
Iowa State		–		6	–	3	–	1
Carthage		–		2	–	1	–	1
Cincinnati		–		4	–	2	–	2
Missouri		–		5	–	3	–	0
Miami (OH)		–		5	–	3	–	1
Kansas		–		6	–	4	–	0
South Dakota Agricultural		–		3	–	2	–	0
Fairmount		–		4	–	3	–	1
Detroit College		–		3	–	3	–	0
Lake Forest		–		4	–	4	–	1
Lincoln (MO)		–		1	–	1	–	0
Western Illinois		–		2	–	2	–	0
Wittenberg		–		3	–	4	–	2
Washburn		–		3	–	4	–	0
Doane		–		2	–	3	–	0
Heidelberg		–		3	–	5	–	1
Wabash		–		2	–	4	–	2
Buchtel		–		2	–	5	–	0
Washington University		–		2	–	6	–	1
Butler		–		1	–	3	–	0
Kansas State		–		2	–	6	–	0
Michigan State Normal		–		1	–	5	–	1
Iowa State Normal		–		1	–	6	–	1
Ohio		–		0	–	5	–	1

The 1902 Kansas State Aggies football team was an American football team that represented Kansas State Agricultural College during the 1902 college football season. In its first and only season under head coach Cyrus E. Dietz, the team compiled a 2–6 record and was outscored by a total of 121 to 46. On October 7, 1902, the Kansas State team played University of Kansas Jayhawks at McCook Field in Lawrence, KS, in the first meeting of a series that became the Kansas–Kansas State football rivalry. The team played its home games at Athletic Park in Manhattan, Kansas.

== Schedule ==
Date	Opponent	Site	Result	Attendance	Source
September 27	at Kansas State Normal	Emporia, KS	L 0–16		
October 7	at Kansas	McCook Field; Lawrence, KS (rivalry)	L 0–16		
October 11	Haskell	Athletic Park; Manhattan, KS	L 0–23		
October 23	Fort Riley	Athletic Park; Manhattan, KS	L 0–6		
November 1	Ottawa	Manhattan, KS	L 0–17		
November 10	at Bethany (KS)	Lindsborg, KS	L 0-40		
November 22	Haskell	Manhattan, KS	W 24–0		
November 27	Chapman High School	Athletic Park; Manhattan, KS	W 22–5	600	
