= James R. Henry (American football) =

American football player and coach

Playing career
- 1897: Michigan
- 1898–1900: Chicago
- Positions: Halfback, end

Coaching career (HC unless noted)
- 1902: DePauw
- 1903: Vanderbilt

Head coaching record
- Overall: 11–6–1

Accomplishments and honors

Championships
- 1 SIAA (1903)

Awards
- All-Western (1900)

James Ronald Henry was an American college football player and coach. He played football at the University of Michigan in 1897 and the University of Chicago from 1898 to 1900. He was selected to the 1900 All-Western college football team as a halfback. Henry served the head football coach at DePauw University for one season in 1902 and at Vanderbilt University for one season in 1903, compiling a career head coaching record of 11–6–1. He later worked as a general manager of factories for National Biscuit Company in Chicago.

== Head coaching record ==
| Year | Team | Overall | Conference | Standing | Bowl/playoffs |
|---|---|---|---|---|---|
DePauw (Independent) (1902)
| 1902 | DePauw | 5–5 | | | |
| DePauw: | | 5–5 | | | |
Vanderbilt Commodores (Southern Intercollegiate Athletic Association) (1903)
| 1903 | Vanderbilt | 6–1–1 | 5–1–1 | T–1st | |
| Vanderbilt: | | 6–1–1 | 5–1–1 | | |
| Total: | | 11–6–1 | | | |
