= 1902 Purdue Boilermakers football team =

American college football season

1902 Purdue Boilermakers football
- Conference: Western Conference
- Record: 7–2–1 (2–2 Western)
- Head coach: Charles Best (1st season)
- Captain: Harry G. Leslie
- Home stadium: Stuart Field

1902 Western Conference football standings
	Conf.					Overall
Team	W		L		T	W		L		T
Michigan $	5	–	0	–	0	11	–	0	–	0
Chicago	5	–	1	–	0	11	–	1	–	0
Minnesota	3	–	1	–	0	9	–	2	–	1
Illinois	4	–	2	–	0	10	–	2	–	1
Purdue	2	–	2	–	0	7	–	2	–	1
Wisconsin	1	–	3	–	0	6	–	3	–	0
Iowa	0	–	3	–	0	5	–	4	–	0
Northwestern	0	–	4	–	0	6	–	6	–	0
Indiana	0	–	4	–	0	3	–	5	–	1
$ – Conference champion

The 1902 Purdue Boilermakers football team was an American football team that represented Purdue University during the 1902 Western Conference football season. In their first season under head coach Charles Best, the Boilermakers compiled a 7–2–1 record, finished in fifth place in the Western Conference, and outscored their opponents by a total of 315 to 68. Harry G. Leslie was the team captain.

== Schedule ==
Date	Opponent	Site	Result	Attendance	Source
September 27	Franklin (IN)*	Stuart Field; West Lafayette, IN	W 56–0		
October 4	DePauw*	Stuart Field; West Lafayette, IN	W 40–0		
October 11	at Chicago	Marshall Field; Chicago, IL (rivalry)	L 0–33		
October 18	at Illinois	Illinois Field; Champaign, IL (rivalry)	L 5–29		
October 25	Case*	Stuart Field; West Lafayette, IN	W 5–0		
October 31	vs. Northwestern	West Side Baseball Park; Chicago, IL	W 5–0	3,000	
November 8	Greer College*	Stuart Field; West Lafayette, IN	W 73–0		
November 15	Indiana	Stuart Field; West Lafayette, IN (rivalry)	W 39–0		
November 22	Butler*	Stuart Field; West Lafayette, IN	W 87–0		
November 27	Notre Dame*	Stuart Field; West Lafayette, IN (rivalry)	T 6–6		
*Non-conference game

== Roster ==
- D. M. Allen, T
- A. H. Barnes, E
- H. G. Barnes, T
- F. V. Berkey, FB
- J. C. Boyer, G
- William Collar, QB
- J. M. Davidson, C
- G. A. Davis, T
- F. C. Hohn, E
- Thomas Johnston, QB
- W. G. Kaylor, FB
- Joseph Knapp, HB
- Harry G. Leslie, FB
- John Miller, G
- Edward Mills, HB
- I. S. Osborn, QB
- F. Riebel, G
- Leo Rush
- W. E. Russell, HB
