= Peter McPherson (American football) =

American football player and coach (1874–1941)

Biographical details
- Born: May 17, 1874; Caledonia, New York, U.S.
- Died: November 8, 1941 (aged 67); Rochester, New York, U.S.

Playing career
- 1896–1897: Wadsworth Normal
- 1899–1900: Buffalo
- Position: Halfback

Coaching career (HC unless noted)
- 1902–1903: Miami (OH)

Head coaching record
- Overall: 6–7–1 (college)

Peter McPherson (May 17, 1874 – November 8, 1941) was an American college football player and coach and a dentist.

== Biography ==
McPherson played halfback at Wadsworth Normal and Training School (now SUNY Geneseo) from 1896 to 1897 and later at the University at Buffalo from 1898 to 1900 while attending dental school. He served as the head coach at Miami University in Oxford, Ohio from 1902 to 1903, compiling a record of 6–7–1.

McPherson later worked as a dentist in Caledonia, New York and coached the Caledonia High School football team for 23 years. He died in 1941 after succumbing to injuries sustained when struck by a car.

== Head coaching record ==
Year	Team	Overall	Conference	Standing	Bowl/playoffs
Miami Redskins (Independent) (1902–1903)
1902	Miami	5–3–1			
1903	Miami	1–4			
Miami:		6–7–1			
Total:		6–7–1			
