= 1902 Lake Forest Foresters football team =

American college football season

1902 Lake Forest Foresters football
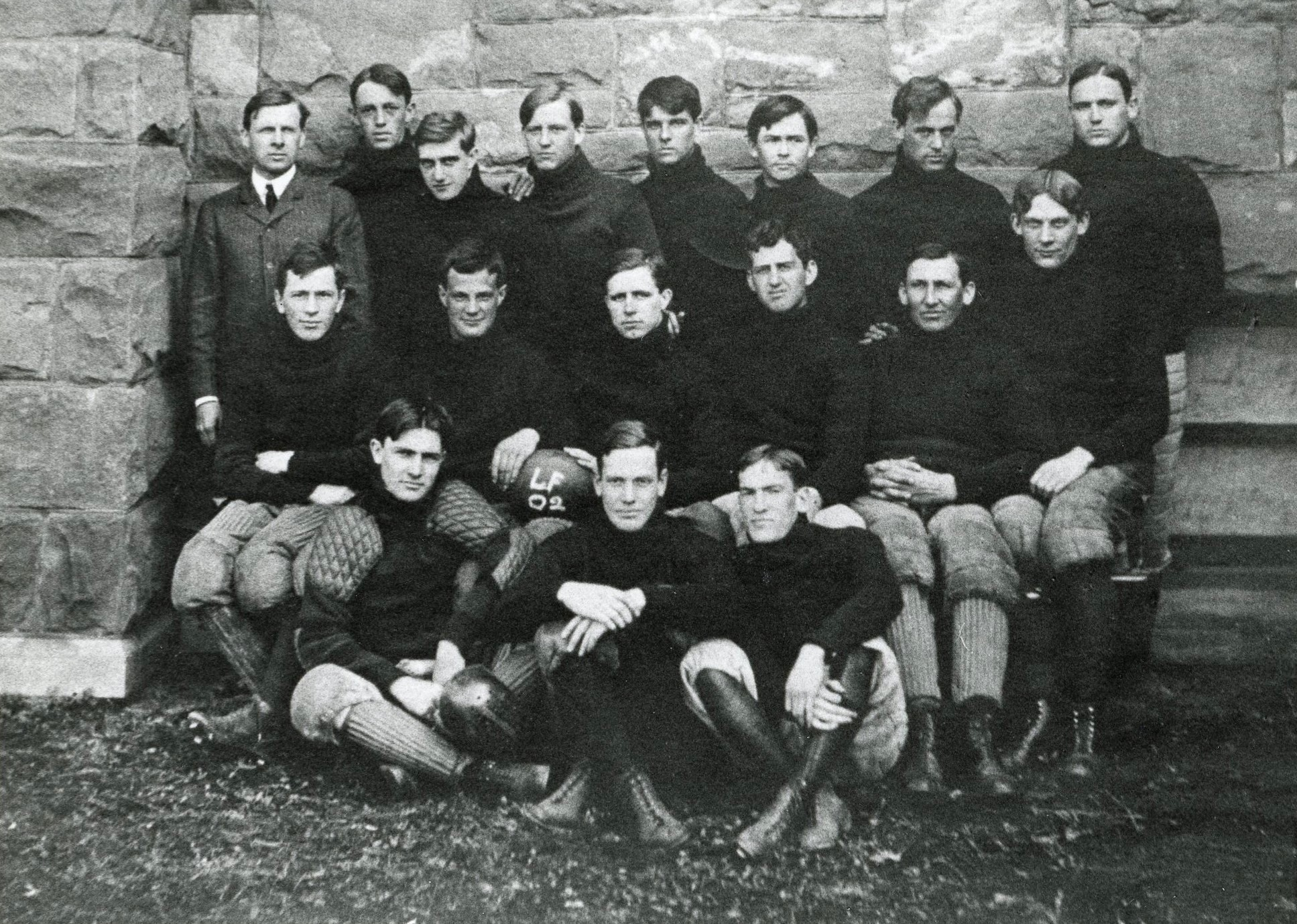
- Conference: Independent
- Record: 4–4–1
- Head coach: Clarence Herschberger (1st season)

1902 Midwestern college football independents records
	Conf.			Overall
Team	W	L	T	W		L		T
Nebraska		–		9	–	0	–	0
South Dakota		–		9	–	0	–	0
North Dakota Agricultural		–		4	–	0	–	0
Central Michigan		–		4	–	0	–	0
Ohio Medical		–		9	–	1	–	0
Marquette		–		6	–	1	–	1
Knox		–		9	–	2	–	0
Northern Illinois State		–		5	–	1	–	1
Haskell		–		8	–	2	–	1
Notre Dame		–		6	–	2	–	1
Drake		–		5	–	2	–	1
Lincoln (MO)		–		2	–	1	–	0
Mount Union		–		6	–	3	–	0
Iowa State		–		6	–	3	–	1
Carthage		–		2	–	1	–	1
Cincinnati		–		4	–	2	–	2
Missouri		–		5	–	3	–	0
Miami (OH)		–		5	–	3	–	1
Kansas		–		6	–	4	–	0
South Dakota Agricultural		–		3	–	2	–	0
Fairmount		–		4	–	3	–	1
Detroit College		–		3	–	3	–	0
Lake Forest		–		4	–	4	–	1
Lincoln (MO)		–		1	–	1	–	0
Western Illinois		–		2	–	2	–	0
Wittenberg		–		3	–	4	–	2
Washburn		–		3	–	4	–	0
Doane		–		2	–	3	–	0
Heidelberg		–		3	–	5	–	1
Wabash		–		2	–	4	–	2
Buchtel		–		2	–	5	–	0
Washington University		–		2	–	6	–	1
Butler		–		1	–	3	–	0
Kansas State		–		2	–	6	–	0
Michigan State Normal		–		1	–	5	–	1
Iowa State Normal		–		1	–	6	–	1
Ohio		–		0	–	5	–	1

The 1902 Lake Forest Foresters football team was an American football team that represented Lake Forest University in the 1902 college football season.

== Schedule ==
Date	Opponent	Site	Result
October 4	at Northwestern	Sheppard Field; Evanston, IL	L 0–26
October 11	at Notre Dame	Cartier Field; Notre Dame, IN	L 0–28
October 18	Chicago Dental	Lake Forest, IL	L 0–6
October 22	Fort Sheridan	Lake Forest, IL	T 0–0
October 29	Fort Sheridan	Lake Forest, IL	W 6–0
November 8	Waukegan High School	Lake Forest, IL	W 37–0
November 15	at Lawrence	Appleton, WI	L 5–15
November 22	Lake Forest Alumni	Lake Forest, IL	W 17–0
November 27	at Monmouth	Monmouth, IL	W 12–11
