= 1902 Iowa State Cyclones football team =

American college football season

1902 Iowa State Cyclones football
- Conference: Independent
- Record: 6–3–1
- Head coach: A. W. Ristine (1st season)
- Captain: Fred Byl
- Home stadium: State Field

1902 Midwestern college football independents records
	Conf.			Overall
Team	W	L	T	W		L		T
Nebraska		–		9	–	0	–	0
South Dakota		–		9	–	0	–	0
North Dakota Agricultural		–		4	–	0	–	0
Central Michigan		–		4	–	0	–	0
Ohio Medical		–		9	–	1	–	0
Marquette		–		6	–	1	–	1
Knox		–		9	–	2	–	0
Northern Illinois State		–		5	–	1	–	1
Haskell		–		8	–	2	–	1
Notre Dame		–		6	–	2	–	1
Drake		–		5	–	2	–	1
Lincoln (MO)		–		2	–	1	–	0
Mount Union		–		6	–	3	–	0
Iowa State		–		6	–	3	–	1
Carthage		–		2	–	1	–	1
Cincinnati		–		4	–	2	–	2
Missouri		–		5	–	3	–	0
Miami (OH)		–		5	–	3	–	1
Kansas		–		6	–	4	–	0
South Dakota Agricultural		–		3	–	2	–	0
Fairmount		–		4	–	3	–	1
Detroit College		–		3	–	3	–	0
Lake Forest		–		4	–	4	–	1
Lincoln (MO)		–		1	–	1	–	0
Western Illinois		–		2	–	2	–	0
Wittenberg		–		3	–	4	–	2
Washburn		–		3	–	4	–	0
Doane		–		2	–	3	–	0
Heidelberg		–		3	–	5	–	1
Wabash		–		2	–	4	–	2
Buchtel		–		2	–	5	–	0
Washington University		–		2	–	6	–	1
Butler		–		1	–	3	–	0
Kansas State		–		2	–	6	–	0
Michigan State Normal		–		1	–	5	–	1
Iowa State Normal		–		1	–	6	–	1
Ohio		–		0	–	5	–	1

The 1902 Iowa State Cyclones football team represented Iowa State College of Agricultural and Mechanic Arts (later renamed Iowa State University) as an independent during the 1902 college football season. In their first season under head coach A. W. Ristine, the Cyclones compiled a 6–3–1 record, shut out six of ten opponents, and outscored all opponents by a combined total of 246 to 56. Fred Byl was the team captain.

Between 1892 and 1913, the football team played on a field that later became the site of the university's Parks Library. The field was known as State Field; when the new field opened in 1914, it became known as "New State Field".

== Schedule ==
Date	Opponent	Site	Result
September 28	Still	State Field; Ames, IA	W 35–0
October 4	at Minnesota	Northrop Field; Minneapolis, MN	L 0–16
October 11	at Iowa State Normal	Cedar Falls, IA	W 52–0
October 18	Grinnell	State Field; Ames, IA	W 23–0
October 25	at Cornell (IA)	Mount Vernon, IA	L 15–17
November 1	at Iowa	Iowa Field; Iowa City, IA (rivalry)	L 6–12
November 8	Coe	State Field; Ames, IA	W 53–0
November 15	at Drake	Des Moines, IA	T 0–0
November 22	at Penn (IA)	Oskaloosa, IA	W 44–0
November 28	at Simpson	Indianola, IA	W 18–11
