= 1902 Washington University football team =

American college football season

1902 Washington University football
- Conference: Independent
- Record: 2–6–1
- Head coach: Hugh White (1st season)
- Home stadium: Pastime Park, League Park

1902 Midwestern college football independents records
| | Conf. | | | Overall |
| Team | W | L | T | W | | L | | T |
|---|---|---|---|---|---|---|---|---|
| Nebraska | | – | | 9 | – | 0 | – | 0 |
| South Dakota | | – | | 9 | – | 0 | – | 0 |
| North Dakota Agricultural | | – | | 4 | – | 0 | – | 0 |
| Central Michigan | | – | | 4 | – | 0 | – | 0 |
| Ohio Medical | | – | | 9 | – | 1 | – | 0 |
| Marquette | | – | | 6 | – | 1 | – | 1 |
| Knox | | – | | 9 | – | 2 | – | 0 |
| Northern Illinois State | | – | | 5 | – | 1 | – | 1 |
| Haskell | | – | | 8 | – | 2 | – | 1 |
| Notre Dame | | – | | 6 | – | 2 | – | 1 |
| Drake | | – | | 5 | – | 2 | – | 1 |
| Lincoln (MO) | | – | | 2 | – | 1 | – | 0 |
| Mount Union | | – | | 6 | – | 3 | – | 0 |
| Iowa State | | – | | 6 | – | 3 | – | 1 |
| Carthage | | – | | 2 | – | 1 | – | 1 |
| Cincinnati | | – | | 4 | – | 2 | – | 2 |
| Missouri | | – | | 5 | – | 3 | – | 0 |
| Miami (OH) | | – | | 5 | – | 3 | – | 1 |
| Kansas | | – | | 6 | – | 4 | – | 0 |
| South Dakota Agricultural | | – | | 3 | – | 2 | – | 0 |
| Fairmount | | – | | 4 | – | 3 | – | 1 |
| Detroit College | | – | | 3 | – | 3 | – | 0 |
| Lake Forest | | – | | 4 | – | 4 | – | 1 |
| Lincoln (MO) | | – | | 1 | – | 1 | – | 0 |
| Western Illinois | | – | | 2 | – | 2 | – | 0 |
| Wittenberg | | – | | 3 | – | 4 | – | 2 |
| Washburn | | – | | 3 | – | 4 | – | 0 |
| Doane | | – | | 2 | – | 3 | – | 0 |
| Heidelberg | | – | | 3 | – | 5 | – | 1 |
| Wabash | | – | | 2 | – | 4 | – | 2 |
| Buchtel | | – | | 2 | – | 5 | – | 0 |
| Washington University | | – | | 2 | – | 6 | – | 1 |
| Butler | | – | | 1 | – | 3 | – | 0 |
| Kansas State | | – | | 2 | – | 6 | – | 0 |
| Michigan State Normal | | – | | 1 | – | 5 | – | 1 |
| Iowa State Normal | | – | | 1 | – | 6 | – | 1 |
| Ohio | | – | | 0 | – | 5 | – | 1 |

The 1902 Washington University football team represented Washington University in St. Louis as an independent during the 1902 college football season. Led by Hugh White in his first and only season as head coach, Washington University compiled a record of 2–6–1 and was outscored by opponents 210 to 84. White was hired as Washington University's coach in June 1902. He had played college football for four seasons at the University of Michigan and was captain of the 1901 Michigan Wolverines football team coached by Fielding H. Yost.

== Schedule ==
| Date | Time | Opponent | Site | Result | Source |
|---|---|---|---|---|---|
| October 4 | 3:00 p.m. | Lombard | Pastime Park; St. Louis, MO | T 0–0 | |
| October 11 | | at Illinois | Illinois Field; Champaign, IL | L 0–44 | |
| October 18 | | Rose Polytechnic | League Park; St. Louis, MO | W 33–0 | |
| October 25 | 3:00 p.m. | Sewanee | League Park; St. Louis, MO | L 6–22 | |
| November 1 | | at Vanderbilt | Dudley Field; Nashville, TN | L 12–33 | |
| November 8 | 3:00 p.m. | Missouri | League Park; St. Louis, MO | L 0–27 | |
| November 15 | | at Iowa | Iowa Field; Iowa City, IA | L 0–61 | |
| November 22 | 2:30 p.m. | Central (MO) | League Park; St. Louis, MO | W 33–5 | |
| November 27 | 2:45 p.m. | Haskell | League Park; St. Louis, MO | L 0–18 | |
