= 1902 South Dakota Coyotes football team =

American college football season

1902 South Dakota Coyotes football
- Conference: Independent
- Record: 9–0
- Head coach: Arthur H. Whittemore (1st season)

1902 Midwestern college football independents records
	Conf.			Overall
Team	W	L	T	W		L		T
Nebraska		–		9	–	0	–	0
South Dakota		–		9	–	0	–	0
North Dakota Agricultural		–		4	–	0	–	0
Central Michigan		–		4	–	0	–	0
Ohio Medical		–		9	–	1	–	0
Marquette		–		6	–	1	–	1
Knox		–		9	–	2	–	0
Northern Illinois State		–		5	–	1	–	1
Haskell		–		8	–	2	–	1
Notre Dame		–		6	–	2	–	1
Drake		–		5	–	2	–	1
Lincoln (MO)		–		2	–	1	–	0
Mount Union		–		6	–	3	–	0
Iowa State		–		6	–	3	–	1
Carthage		–		2	–	1	–	1
Cincinnati		–		4	–	2	–	2
Missouri		–		5	–	3	–	0
Miami (OH)		–		5	–	3	–	1
Kansas		–		6	–	4	–	0
South Dakota Agricultural		–		3	–	2	–	0
Fairmount		–		4	–	3	–	1
Detroit College		–		3	–	3	–	0
Lake Forest		–		4	–	4	–	1
Lincoln (MO)		–		1	–	1	–	0
Western Illinois		–		2	–	2	–	0
Wittenberg		–		3	–	4	–	2
Washburn		–		3	–	4	–	0
Doane		–		2	–	3	–	0
Heidelberg		–		3	–	5	–	1
Wabash		–		2	–	4	–	2
Buchtel		–		2	–	5	–	0
Washington University		–		2	–	6	–	1
Butler		–		1	–	3	–	0
Kansas State		–		2	–	6	–	0
Michigan State Normal		–		1	–	5	–	1
Iowa State Normal		–		1	–	6	–	1
Ohio		–		0	–	5	–	1

The 1902 South Dakota Coyotes football team was an American football team that represented the University of South Dakota as an independent during the 1902 college football season. In its first season under head coach Arthur H. Whittemore, the team compiled a 9–0 record, shut out every opponent, and outscored them by a total of 204to 0.

The 1902 football season in South Dakota witnessed the death of Harry Jordan, a young man from Sioux Falls, South Dakota, and led to the cancellation of games in that city. At the end of the season, an editorial was published in The Daily Argus-Leader from a correspondent in Britton, South Dakota, proposing a bill "to abolish football within the precincts of South Dakota." The appeal was based on the loss of life and "mutilation" during the prior football season, the loss of study time, and the game's tendency to promote "immorality", including betting, rioting, debauchery, and "the refinement of cruelty, needless senseless cruelty." The author denounced: "That so savage and barbarious a game can meet with the approval of Christian educators and ministers of the gospel in the year of our Lord 1902 is one of the amazing exhibitions of the century."

== Schedule ==
Date	Opponent	Site	Result	Attendance	Source
September 25	at Sioux Falls	County fair; Sioux Falls, SD	W 33–0		
	Missouri Mines		W 23–0		
October 9	at Yankton	Local athletic field; Yankton, SD	W 39–0		
October 14	at Omaha Medical College	Omaha, NE	W 12–0		
October 25	vs. South Dakota Mines	Riverside grounds; Sioux City, IA	W 23–0		
November 12	Yankton	Vermillion, SD	W 23–0		
November 14	Omaha Medical College	Vermillion, SD	W 34–0		
November 20	at South Dakota Agricultural	Brookings, SD (rivalry)	W 10–0		
November 27	Morningside	Woodland Park; Sioux City, IA	W 6–0	1,000	
