= 1902 Drake Bulldogs football team =

American college football season

1902 Drake Bulldogs football
- Conference: Independent
- Record: 5–2–1
- Head coach: G. O. Dietz (1st season)
- Captain: "Squatty" Bates

1902 Midwestern college football independents records
	Conf.			Overall
Team	W	L	T	W		L		T
Nebraska		–		9	–	0	–	0
South Dakota		–		9	–	0	–	0
North Dakota Agricultural		–		4	–	0	–	0
Central Michigan		–		4	–	0	–	0
Ohio Medical		–		9	–	1	–	0
Marquette		–		6	–	1	–	1
Knox		–		9	–	2	–	0
Northern Illinois State		–		5	–	1	–	1
Haskell		–		8	–	2	–	1
Notre Dame		–		6	–	2	–	1
Drake		–		5	–	2	–	1
Lincoln (MO)		–		2	–	1	–	0
Mount Union		–		6	–	3	–	0
Iowa State		–		6	–	3	–	1
Carthage		–		2	–	1	–	1
Cincinnati		–		4	–	2	–	2
Missouri		–		5	–	3	–	0
Miami (OH)		–		5	–	3	–	1
Kansas		–		6	–	4	–	0
South Dakota Agricultural		–		3	–	2	–	0
Fairmount		–		4	–	3	–	1
Detroit College		–		3	–	3	–	0
Lake Forest		–		4	–	4	–	1
Lincoln (MO)		–		1	–	1	–	0
Western Illinois		–		2	–	2	–	0
Wittenberg		–		3	–	4	–	2
Washburn		–		3	–	4	–	0
Doane		–		2	–	3	–	0
Heidelberg		–		3	–	5	–	1
Wabash		–		2	–	4	–	2
Buchtel		–		2	–	5	–	0
Washington University		–		2	–	6	–	1
Butler		–		1	–	3	–	0
Kansas State		–		2	–	6	–	0
Michigan State Normal		–		1	–	5	–	1
Iowa State Normal		–		1	–	6	–	1
Ohio		–		0	–	5	–	1

The 1902 Drake Bulldogs football team was an American football team that represented Drake University as an independent during the 1902 college football season. In its first and only season under head coach G. O. Dietz, the team compiled a 5–2–1 record and outscored opponents by a total of 127 to 23. Left end "Squatty" Bates was the team captain.

== Schedule ==
Date	Opponent	Site	Result	Source
October 4	Grinnell	Des Moines, IA	W 11–0	
October 11	at Iowa	Iowa Field; Iowa City, IA	L 0–12	
October 25	Iowa State Normal	Des Moines, IA (rivalry)	W 36–5	
November 1	at Simpson	Indianola, IA	L 5–6	
November 8	at Cornell (IA)	Mount Vernon, IA	W 6–0	
November 15	Iowa State	Des Moines, IA	T 0–0	
November 21	Des Moines	Des Moines, IA	W 22–0	
November 26	Grinnell	League Park; Des Moines, IA	W 47–0	
