= 1902 Missouri Tigers football team =

American college football season

1902 Missouri Tigers football
- Conference: Independent
- Record: 5–3
- Head coach: Pat O'Dea (1st season)
- Captain: Thomas M. Ellis
- Home stadium: Rollins Field

1902 Midwestern college football independents records
	Conf.			Overall
Team	W	L	T	W		L		T
Nebraska		–		9	–	0	–	0
South Dakota		–		9	–	0	–	0
North Dakota Agricultural		–		4	–	0	–	0
Central Michigan		–		4	–	0	–	0
Ohio Medical		–		9	–	1	–	0
Marquette		–		6	–	1	–	1
Knox		–		9	–	2	–	0
Northern Illinois State		–		5	–	1	–	1
Haskell		–		8	–	2	–	1
Notre Dame		–		6	–	2	–	1
Drake		–		5	–	2	–	1
Lincoln (MO)		–		2	–	1	–	0
Mount Union		–		6	–	3	–	0
Iowa State		–		6	–	3	–	1
Carthage		–		2	–	1	–	1
Cincinnati		–		4	–	2	–	2
Missouri		–		5	–	3	–	0
Miami (OH)		–		5	–	3	–	1
Kansas		–		6	–	4	–	0
South Dakota Agricultural		–		3	–	2	–	0
Fairmount		–		4	–	3	–	1
Detroit College		–		3	–	3	–	0
Lake Forest		–		4	–	4	–	1
Lincoln (MO)		–		1	–	1	–	0
Western Illinois		–		2	–	2	–	0
Wittenberg		–		3	–	4	–	2
Washburn		–		3	–	4	–	0
Doane		–		2	–	3	–	0
Heidelberg		–		3	–	5	–	1
Wabash		–		2	–	4	–	2
Buchtel		–		2	–	5	–	0
Washington University		–		2	–	6	–	1
Butler		–		1	–	3	–	0
Kansas State		–		2	–	6	–	0
Michigan State Normal		–		1	–	5	–	1
Iowa State Normal		–		1	–	6	–	1
Ohio		–		0	–	5	–	1

The 1902 Missouri Tigers football team was an American football team that represented the University of Missouri as an independent during the 1902 college football season. The team compiled a 5-3 record and outscored its opponents by a combined total of 99 to 80. Pat O'Dea was the head coach for the first and only season. The team played its home games at Rollins Field in Columbia, Missouri.

== Schedule ==
Date	Time	Opponent	Site	Result	Attendance	Source
October 11		Simpson	Rollins Field; Columbia, MO	W 11–6		
October 18	3:00 p.m.	vs. Haskell	Exposition Park; Kansas City, MO	L 0–40		
October 25	4:00 p.m.	vs. Nebraska	League Park; St. Joseph, MO (rivalry)	L 0–12	2,000	
November 1		Washburn	Rollins Field; Columbia, MO	W 28–0		
November 8	3:00 p.m.	at Washington University	League Park; St. Louis, MO	W 27–0		
November 12		Oklahoma	Rollins Field; Columbia, MO (rivalry)	W 22–5		
November 20		at Iowa	Iowa Field; Iowa City, IA	W 6–0		
November 27	2:30 p.m.	vs. Kansas	Sportsman's Park; Kansas City, MO (rivalry)	L 5–17	10,000	
