= Edgar Holt (American football) =

American football player and coach (1874–1924)

Biographical details
- Born: July 2, 1874; Lawrence, Massachusetts, U.S.
- Died: April 19, 1924 (aged 49)

Playing career
- 1893–1895: Princeton
- Position: Tackle

Coaching career (HC unless noted)
- 1899: Princeton (assistant)
- 1900: Illinois (assistant)
- 1901–1902: Illinois

Head coaching record
- Overall: 18–4–1

Edgar Garrison Holt (July 2, 1874 – April 19, 1924) was an American college football coach. He served as the head football coach at the University of Illinois at Urbana–Champaign from 1901 to 1902, compiling a record of 18–4–1. Holt was born on July 2, 1874, in Lawrence, Massachusetts. Holt was an assistant coach at Princeton University in 1899. He came to Illinois in 1900 as an assistant coach under Fred L. Smith.

== Head coaching record ==
Year	Team	Overall	Conference	Standing	Bowl/playoffs
Illinois Fighting Illini (Western Conference) (1901–1902)
1901	Illinois	8–2	4–2	4th	
1902	Illinois	10–2–1	4–2	4th	
Illinois:		18–4–1	8–4		
Total:		18–4–1			
