= 1902 Cincinnati football team =

American college football season

1902 Cincinnati football
- Conference: Independent
- Record: 4–2–2
- Head coach: Anthony Chez (1st season)
- Captain: Harry Box
- Home stadium: Norwood Inn Park; University athletic field, Burnet Woods

1902 Midwestern college football independents records
	Conf.			Overall
Team	W	L	T	W		L		T
Nebraska		–		9	–	0	–	0
South Dakota		–		9	–	0	–	0
North Dakota Agricultural		–		4	–	0	–	0
Central Michigan		–		4	–	0	–	0
Ohio Medical		–		9	–	1	–	0
Marquette		–		6	–	1	–	1
Knox		–		9	–	2	–	0
Northern Illinois State		–		5	–	1	–	1
Haskell		–		8	–	2	–	1
Notre Dame		–		6	–	2	–	1
Drake		–		5	–	2	–	1
Lincoln (MO)		–		2	–	1	–	0
Mount Union		–		6	–	3	–	0
Iowa State		–		6	–	3	–	1
Carthage		–		2	–	1	–	1
Cincinnati		–		4	–	2	–	2
Missouri		–		5	–	3	–	0
Miami (OH)		–		5	–	3	–	1
Kansas		–		6	–	4	–	0
South Dakota Agricultural		–		3	–	2	–	0
Fairmount		–		4	–	3	–	1
Detroit College		–		3	–	3	–	0
Lake Forest		–		4	–	4	–	1
Lincoln (MO)		–		1	–	1	–	0
Western Illinois		–		2	–	2	–	0
Wittenberg		–		3	–	4	–	2
Washburn		–		3	–	4	–	0
Doane		–		2	–	3	–	0
Heidelberg		–		3	–	5	–	1
Wabash		–		2	–	4	–	2
Buchtel		–		2	–	5	–	0
Washington University		–		2	–	6	–	1
Butler		–		1	–	3	–	0
Kansas State		–		2	–	6	–	0
Michigan State Normal		–		1	–	5	–	1
Iowa State Normal		–		1	–	6	–	1
Ohio		–		0	–	5	–	1

The 1902 Cincinnati football team was an American football team that represented the University of Cincinnati as an independent during the 1902 college football season. Led by first-year head coach Anthony Chez, Cincinnati compiled a record of 4–2–2. Harry Box was the team captain. The team played home games in Cincinnati. The first game of the season was played at Norwood Inn Park, and the remainder were played at the university's newly opened athletic field located in Burnet Woods.

== Schedule ==
Date	Time	Opponent	Site	Result	Source
October 4	2:30 p.m.	Hanover	Norwood Inn Park; Cincinnati, OH	W 18–0	
October 11		at Earlham	Reid Field; Richmond, IN	W 12–6	
October 18	3:00 p.m.	Butler	University athletic field, Burnet Woods; Cincinnati, OH	W 6–0	
October 25		Stumps	Cincinnati, OH	L 0–23	
November 1		Otterbein	Cincinnati, OH	W 16–0	
November 8	3:00 p.m.	Wittenberg	University athletic field, Burnet Woods; Cincinnati, OH	T 0–0	
November 15	2:30 p.m.	at Kentucky State College	State College grounds; Lexington, KY	T 6–6	
November 22		at Marietta	Marietta, OH	L 0–10	
