= Charles Best (American football) =

American football and basketball coach (1874–1962)

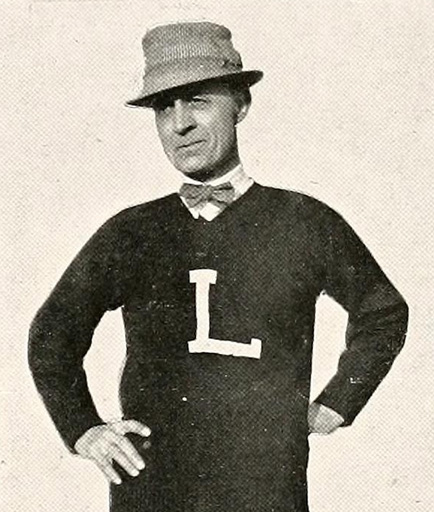
- Best pictured in The Cap & Gown 1918, Sewanee yearbook

Biographical details
- Born: July 25, 1874; Mechanicsburg, Pennsylvania, U.S.
- Died: July 4, 1962 (aged 87); Alameda County, California, U.S.
- Education: Lafayette University (1899)

Playing career

Football
- 1898: Lafayette
- Position: Quarterback

Coaching career (HC unless noted)

Football
- 1900–1901: Drake
- 1902: Purdue
- 1917–1918: Sewanee

Basketball
- 1901–1902: Purdue

Head coaching record
- Overall: 24–13–3 (football); 10–3 (basketball)

Charles Monroe Best (July 25, 1874 – July 4, 1962) was an American football and basketball coach. He served as the head football coach at Drake University (1900–1901), Purdue University (1902), and Sewanee: The University of the South (1917–1918), compiling a career college football coaching record of 24–13–3. Best was also the head basketball coach at Purdue for one season, in 1901–02, tallying a mark of 10–3.

== Coaching career ==
=== Drake ===
Best was the fifth head football coach at Drake University in Des Moines, Iowa, serving for two seasons, from 1900 to 1901, and compiling a record of 10–7.

=== Purdue ===
Best coached the 1902 season at Purdue University in West Lafayette, Indiana. He had his most successful season at Purdue, posting a record of 7–2–1.

== Head coaching record ==
=== Football ===
Year	Team	Overall	Conference	Standing	Bowl/playoffs
Drake Bulldogs (Independent) (1900–1901)
1900	Drake	6–3			
1901	Drake	4–4			
Drake:		10–7			
Purdue Boilermakers (Western Conference) ({{{startyear}}})
1902	Purdue	7–2–1	2–2	5th	
Purdue:		7–2–1	2–2		
Sewanee Tigers (Southern Intercollegiate Athletic Association) (1917–1918)
1917	Sewanee	4–2–2	3–2–2		
1918	Sewanee	3–2	0–1		
Sewanee:		7–4–1	3–3–2		
Total:		24–13–3			

=== Basketball ===
Record table
Season	Team	Overall	Conference	Standing	Postseason
Purdue Boilermakers (Western Conference) (1901–1902)
1901–02	Purdue	10–3	2–0	T–1st†	
Purdue:		10–3 (.769)			
Total:		10–3 (.769)			

† Intramural play only; the conference did not have an official championship winner
