= 1902 Miami Redskins football team =

American college football season

1902 Miami Redskins football
- Conference: Independent
- Record: 5–3–1
- Head coach: Peter McPherson (1st season)
- Home stadium: Miami Field

1902 Midwestern college football independents records
	Conf.			Overall
Team	W	L	T	W		L		T
Nebraska		–		9	–	0	–	0
South Dakota		–		9	–	0	–	0
North Dakota Agricultural		–		4	–	0	–	0
Central Michigan		–		4	–	0	–	0
Ohio Medical		–		9	–	1	–	0
Marquette		–		6	–	1	–	1
Knox		–		9	–	2	–	0
Northern Illinois State		–		5	–	1	–	1
Haskell		–		8	–	2	–	1
Notre Dame		–		6	–	2	–	1
Drake		–		5	–	2	–	1
Lincoln (MO)		–		2	–	1	–	0
Mount Union		–		6	–	3	–	0
Iowa State		–		6	–	3	–	1
Carthage		–		2	–	1	–	1
Cincinnati		–		4	–	2	–	2
Missouri		–		5	–	3	–	0
Miami (OH)		–		5	–	3	–	1
Kansas		–		6	–	4	–	0
South Dakota Agricultural		–		3	–	2	–	0
Fairmount		–		4	–	3	–	1
Detroit College		–		3	–	3	–	0
Lake Forest		–		4	–	4	–	1
Lincoln (MO)		–		1	–	1	–	0
Western Illinois		–		2	–	2	–	0
Wittenberg		–		3	–	4	–	2
Washburn		–		3	–	4	–	0
Doane		–		2	–	3	–	0
Heidelberg		–		3	–	5	–	1
Wabash		–		2	–	4	–	2
Buchtel		–		2	–	5	–	0
Washington University		–		2	–	6	–	1
Butler		–		1	–	3	–	0
Kansas State		–		2	–	6	–	0
Michigan State Normal		–		1	–	5	–	1
Iowa State Normal		–		1	–	6	–	1
Ohio		–		0	–	5	–	1

The 1902 Miami Redskins football team was an American football team that represented Miami University during the 1902 college football season. Under new head coach Peter McPherson, Miami compiled a 5–3–1 record.

== Schedule ==
Date	Opponent	Site	Result
	Cincinnati Walnut Hills High School (Note: Miami does not record this game in their media guide.)		L 5–11
October 4	at Kentucky State College	Lexington, KY	L 5–11
October 9	at St. Xavier	Cincinnati, OH	T 0–0
October 18	Earlham	Miami Field; Oxford, OH	W 12–0
October 25	Centre	Danville, KY	L 6–12
November 1	Wittenberg	Springfield, OH	W 11–0
November 8	Otterbein		W 6–5
November 15	Earlham	Greencastle, IN	W 22–0
November 27	Denison		W 24–5
