= 1902 Ohio Green and White football team =

American college football season

1902 Ohio Green and White football
- Conference: Independent
- Record: 0–6–1
- Head coach: Harold Monosmith (1st season)

1902 Midwestern college football independents records
	Conf.			Overall
Team	W	L	T	W		L		T
Nebraska		–		9	–	0	–	0
South Dakota		–		9	–	0	–	0
North Dakota Agricultural		–		4	–	0	–	0
Central Michigan		–		4	–	0	–	0
Ohio Medical		–		9	–	1	–	0
Marquette		–		6	–	1	–	1
Knox		–		9	–	2	–	0
Northern Illinois State		–		5	–	1	–	1
Haskell		–		8	–	2	–	1
Notre Dame		–		6	–	2	–	1
Drake		–		5	–	2	–	1
Lincoln (MO)		–		2	–	1	–	0
Mount Union		–		6	–	3	–	0
Iowa State		–		6	–	3	–	1
Carthage		–		2	–	1	–	1
Cincinnati		–		4	–	2	–	2
Missouri		–		5	–	3	–	0
Miami (OH)		–		5	–	3	–	1
Kansas		–		6	–	4	–	0
South Dakota Agricultural		–		3	–	2	–	0
Fairmount		–		4	–	3	–	1
Detroit College		–		3	–	3	–	0
Lake Forest		–		4	–	4	–	1
Lincoln (MO)		–		1	–	1	–	0
Western Illinois		–		2	–	2	–	0
Wittenberg		–		3	–	4	–	2
Washburn		–		3	–	4	–	0
Doane		–		2	–	3	–	0
Heidelberg		–		3	–	5	–	1
Wabash		–		2	–	4	–	2
Buchtel		–		2	–	5	–	0
Washington University		–		2	–	6	–	1
Butler		–		1	–	3	–	0
Kansas State		–		2	–	6	–	0
Michigan State Normal		–		1	–	5	–	1
Iowa State Normal		–		1	–	6	–	1
Ohio		–		0	–	5	–	1

The 1902 Ohio Green and White football team represented Ohio University in the 1902 college football season as an independent. Led by Harold Monosmith in his first and only year as head coach, the Green and White compiled a record of 0–6–1, being outscored 0–165.

== Schedule ==
Date	Opponent	Site	Result	Source
	Parkersburg High School		T 0–0	
October 4	at Ohio State	Ohio Field; Columbus, OH	L 0–17	
	Parkersburg AC		L 0–31	
November 1	Marietta	Athens, OH	L 0–22	
November 8	at Western University of Pennsylvania	Colosseum; Pittsburgh, PA	L 0–34	
	Bethany (WV)		L 0–11	
November 27	Marietta	Marietta, OH	L 0–50	
