= 1902 Northern Illinois State Normal football team =

American college football season

1902 Northern Illinois State Normal football
- Conference: Independent
- Record: 5–1–1
- Head coach: John A. H. Keith (4th season)
- Captain: Sanford Givens

1902 Midwestern college football independents records
	Conf.			Overall
Team	W	L	T	W		L		T
Nebraska		–		9	–	0	–	0
South Dakota		–		9	–	0	–	0
North Dakota Agricultural		–		4	–	0	–	0
Central Michigan		–		4	–	0	–	0
Ohio Medical		–		9	–	1	–	0
Marquette		–		6	–	1	–	1
Knox		–		9	–	2	–	0
Northern Illinois State		–		5	–	1	–	1
Haskell		–		8	–	2	–	1
Notre Dame		–		6	–	2	–	1
Drake		–		5	–	2	–	1
Lincoln (MO)		–		2	–	1	–	0
Mount Union		–		6	–	3	–	0
Iowa State		–		6	–	3	–	1
Carthage		–		2	–	1	–	1
Cincinnati		–		4	–	2	–	2
Missouri		–		5	–	3	–	0
Miami (OH)		–		5	–	3	–	1
Kansas		–		6	–	4	–	0
South Dakota Agricultural		–		3	–	2	–	0
Fairmount		–		4	–	3	–	1
Detroit College		–		3	–	3	–	0
Lake Forest		–		4	–	4	–	1
Lincoln (MO)		–		1	–	1	–	0
Western Illinois		–		2	–	2	–	0
Wittenberg		–		3	–	4	–	2
Washburn		–		3	–	4	–	0
Doane		–		2	–	3	–	0
Heidelberg		–		3	–	5	–	1
Wabash		–		2	–	4	–	2
Buchtel		–		2	–	5	–	0
Washington University		–		2	–	6	–	1
Butler		–		1	–	3	–	0
Kansas State		–		2	–	6	–	0
Michigan State Normal		–		1	–	5	–	1
Iowa State Normal		–		1	–	6	–	1
Ohio		–		0	–	5	–	1

The 1902 Northern Illinois State Normal football team represented Northern Illinois State Normal College as an independent in the 1902 college football season. They were led by fourth-year head coach John A. H. Keith. The team finished the season with a 5–1–1 record. Sanford Givens was the team's captain.

== Schedule ==
Date	Opponent	Site	Result	Source
October 9	at Sandwich High School	Sandwich, IL	W 6–0	
October 18	Geneva Athletic Association	DeKalb, IL	W 22–0	
October 23	at Plano High School	Plano, IL	T 0–0	
November 1	Plano High School	DeKalb, IL	W 23–0	
November 8	at Geneva High School	Geneva, IL	W 11–0	
November 15	Eastern Illinois	Athletic Park; DeKalb, IL	W 10–0	
November 27	at Whitewater State	Whitewater, WI	L 5–16	
