= 1902 Nebraska Cornhuskers football team =

American college football season

1902 Nebraska Cornhuskers football
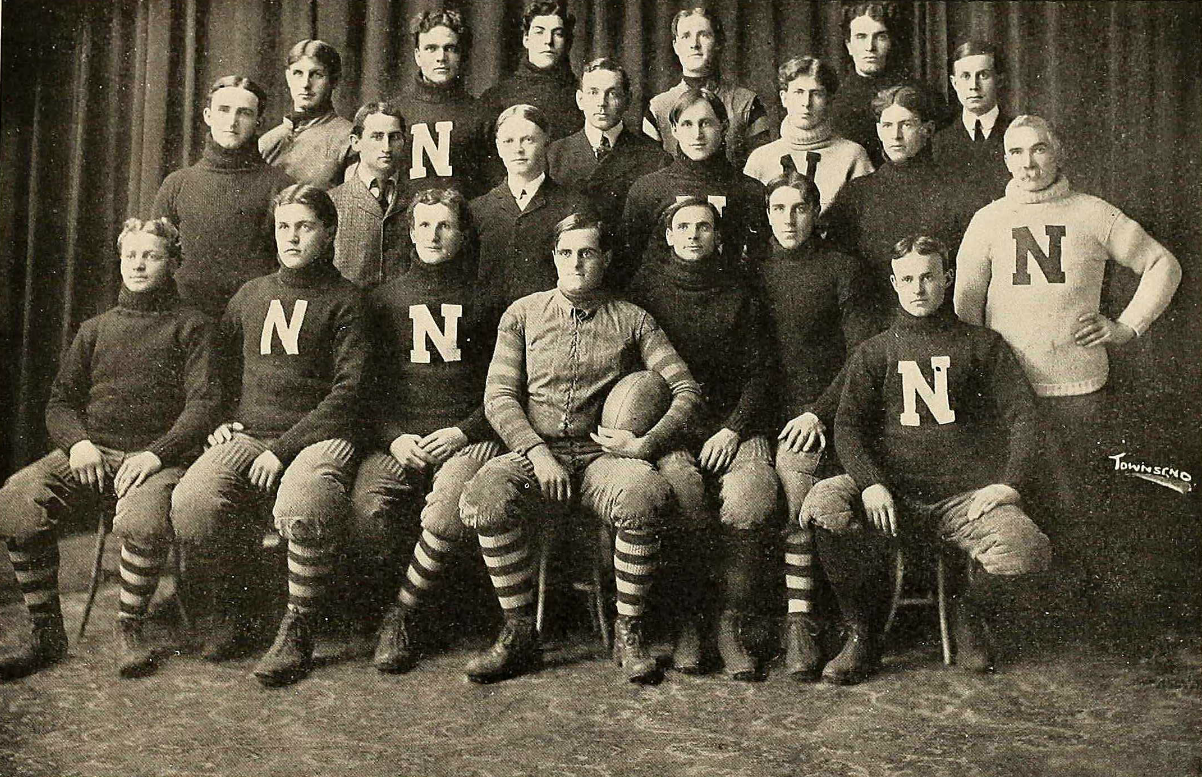
- Conference: Independent
- Record: 9–0
- Head coach: Walter C. Booth (3rd season)
- Home stadium: Antelope Field

1902 Midwestern college football independents records
	Conf.			Overall
Team	W	L	T	W		L		T
Nebraska		–		9	–	0	–	0
South Dakota		–		9	–	0	–	0
North Dakota Agricultural		–		4	–	0	–	0
Central Michigan		–		4	–	0	–	0
Ohio Medical		–		9	–	1	–	0
Marquette		–		6	–	1	–	1
Knox		–		9	–	2	–	0
Northern Illinois State		–		5	–	1	–	1
Haskell		–		8	–	2	–	1
Notre Dame		–		6	–	2	–	1
Drake		–		5	–	2	–	1
Lincoln (MO)		–		2	–	1	–	0
Mount Union		–		6	–	3	–	0
Iowa State		–		6	–	3	–	1
Carthage		–		2	–	1	–	1
Cincinnati		–		4	–	2	–	2
Missouri		–		5	–	3	–	0
Miami (OH)		–		5	–	3	–	1
Kansas		–		6	–	4	–	0
South Dakota Agricultural		–		3	–	2	–	0
Fairmount		–		4	–	3	–	1
Detroit College		–		3	–	3	–	0
Lake Forest		–		4	–	4	–	1
Lincoln (MO)		–		1	–	1	–	0
Western Illinois		–		2	–	2	–	0
Wittenberg		–		3	–	4	–	2
Washburn		–		3	–	4	–	0
Doane		–		2	–	3	–	0
Heidelberg		–		3	–	5	–	1
Wabash		–		2	–	4	–	2
Buchtel		–		2	–	5	–	0
Washington University		–		2	–	6	–	1
Butler		–		1	–	3	–	0
Kansas State		–		2	–	6	–	0
Michigan State Normal		–		1	–	5	–	1
Iowa State Normal		–		1	–	6	–	1
Ohio		–		0	–	5	–	1

The 1902 Nebraska Cornhuskers football team represented the University of Nebraska as an independent during the 1902 college football season. Led by third-year head coach Walter C. Booth, the Cornhuskers compiled a record of 9–0, excluding one exhibition game. Nebraska played home games at Antelope Field in Lincoln, Nebraska.

Cornhuskers compiled a 9–0 record and shut out every opponent by a combined score of 164–0. The Cornhuskers 's hopes to be considered the western champion were dashed when 11–0 Michigan was selected instead selected following their season-ending 23–6 win over Minnesota (Nebraska defeated the Gophers 6–0). Believing Michigan's membership in the Western Conference elevated its title chances, Nebraska applied to the conference following the season, but the application was denied on account of Lincoln's distance from other schools in the conference. Nebraska ultimately joined the conference over 100 years later, in 2011.

== Schedule ==
Date	Time	Opponent	Site	Result	Attendance	Source
September 20		Lincoln High School	Antelope Field; Lincoln, NE	W 27–0 (exhibition)		
September 27		Doane	Antelope Field; Lincoln, NE	W 51–0		
October 4		at Colorado	Gamble Field; Boulder, CO (rivalry)	W 10–0		
October 11		Grinnell	Antelope Field; Lincoln, NE	W 17–0		
October 18		Minnesota	Northrop Field; Minneapolis, MN (rivalry)	W 6–0	7,000	
October 25	4:00 p.m.	vs. Missouri	League Park; St. Joseph, MO (rivalry)	W 12–0	2,000	
November 1		Haskell	Antelope Field; Lincoln, NE	W 28–0	6,000	
November 8		Kansas	Antelope Field; Lincoln, NE (rivalry)	W 16–0	2,000	
November 15		Knox	Antelope Field; Lincoln, NE	W 7–0		
November 27		Northwestern	Antelope Field; Lincoln, NE	W 12–0	6,000	

== Coaching staff ==
Coach	Position	First year	Alma mater
Walter C. Booth	Head coach	1900	Princeton
Lew Palmer	Assistant coach	1902	Princeton
Jack Best	Trainer	1890	Nebraska
Charles Engel	Manager	1902	Nebraska
John Westover	Assistant manager	1904	Nebraska

== Roster ==
Bell, Johnny HB
Bender, Johnny HB
Benedict, Maurice QB
Borg, Charles C
Briggs T
Cortelyou, Spencer E
Cotton, Charles RG
Engelhart, William FB
Follmer, Eugene E
Hunter, Fred RG
Mason, Cyrus LT
Mickel, Oliver FB
Ringer, John LG
Shedd, Charlie E
Symondynes HB
Thorpe, Orley QB
Tobin, John G
Westover, John RT
Wilson, Harry LT

== Game summaries ==
=== Lincoln High ===
Lincoln High at Nebraska

Team	1	2	Total
Lincoln High			0
• Nebraska			27

- Date: September 20
- Location: Antelope Field, Lincoln, NE

For the fourth consecutive season, NU opened the year with an exhibition game against Lincoln High School.

=== Doane ===
Doane at Nebraska

Team	1	2	Total
Doane	0	0	0
• Nebraska	22	29	51

- Date: September 27
- Location: Antelope Field, Lincoln, NE

=== At Colorado ===
Nebraska at Colorado

Team	1	2	Total
• Nebraska	5	5	10
Colorado	0	0	0

- Date: October 4
- Location: Boulder, CO

Nebraska met Colorado for the second time in Boulder. A touchdown in each half and a stiff defensive effort secured Nebraska's third straight shutout victory.

=== Grinnell ===
Grinnell at Nebraska

Team	1	2	Total
Grinnell	0	0	0
• Nebraska	12	5	17

- Date: October 11
- Location: Antelope Field, Lincoln, NE
- Game weather: Rain

Nebraska was shorthanded due to injury, but the Cornhuskers posted another shutout victory on a rainy day in Lincoln.

=== Minnesota ===
Nebraska at Minnesota

Team	1	2	Total
Minnesota	0	0	0
• Nebraska	0	6	6

- Date: October 18
- Location: Northrop Field, Minneapolis, MN

Nebraska traveled to Minneapolis to face the Gophers for a third time. The game remained scoreless until the final minutes, when the Cornhuskers scored a touchdown for what would be the only points of the day. Minnesota lost only one other game the rest of the season, outscoring its opponents 335–34.

=== Missouri ===
Nebraska vs. Missouri

Team	1	2	Total
• Nebraska	6	6	12
Missouri	0	0	0

- Date: October 25
- Location: St. Joseph, MO
- Game attendance: 2,000

Meeting Missouri on new neutral ground, in St. Joseph for the first time, the Cornhuskers ended an early scoring attempt by Missouri at the Nebraska 7-yard line, and then shut down the Tigers for the rest of the day, while making two touchdowns of their own to extend the shutout streak to 6, and the series lead to 8–3.

=== Haskell ===
Haskell at Nebraska

Team	1	2	Total
Haskell	0	0	0
• Nebraska	6	22	28

- Date: November 1
- Location: Antelope Field, Lincoln, NE
- Game attendance: 6,000

=== Kansas ===
Kansas at Nebraska

Team	1	2	Total
Kansas			0
• Nebraska			16

- Date: November 8
- Location: Antelope Field, Lincoln, NE

Nebraska ran its shutout streak to seven consecutive games, thanks in part to a "trick placekick", that was instead run for a touchdown.

=== Knox ===
Knox at Nebraska

Team	1	2	Total
Knox	0	0	0
• Nebraska	7	0	7

- Date: November 15
- Location: Antelope Field, Lincoln, NE

Nebraska hosted Knox in the first game between the teams, in what would become one of only two one-score game NU played all season. Knox held Nebraska to just seven points, but the Cornhuskers made a goal-line stand in the second half to record an eighth consecutive shutout.

=== Northwestern ===
Northwestern at Nebraska

Team	1	2	Total
Northwestern			0
• Nebraska			12

- Date: November 27
- Location: Antelope Field, Lincoln, NE

Nebraska met Northwestern in the first matchup between teams that would become division rivals over 100 years later when NU joined the Big Ten. Northwestern players complained of rough treatment from NU throughout the penalty-ridden game. Nebraska was penalized for seven holding penalties, each of which required turning over the ball according to the rules of the time, but held Northwestern scoreless for a ninth straight shutout win to end the season with a perfect record.
