= 1902 Knox Old Siwash football team =

American college football season

1902 Knox Old Siwash football
- Conference: Independent
- Record: 9–2
- Head coach: John McLean (2nd season)
- Captain: F. Ewing (right tackle)

1902 Midwestern college football independents records
	Conf.			Overall
Team	W	L	T	W		L		T
Nebraska		–		9	–	0	–	0
South Dakota		–		9	–	0	–	0
North Dakota Agricultural		–		4	–	0	–	0
Central Michigan		–		4	–	0	–	0
Ohio Medical		–		9	–	1	–	0
Marquette		–		6	–	1	–	1
Knox		–		9	–	2	–	0
Northern Illinois State		–		5	–	1	–	1
Haskell		–		8	–	2	–	1
Notre Dame		–		6	–	2	–	1
Drake		–		5	–	2	–	1
Lincoln (MO)		–		2	–	1	–	0
Mount Union		–		6	–	3	–	0
Iowa State		–		6	–	3	–	1
Carthage		–		2	–	1	–	1
Cincinnati		–		4	–	2	–	2
Missouri		–		5	–	3	–	0
Miami (OH)		–		5	–	3	–	1
Kansas		–		6	–	4	–	0
South Dakota Agricultural		–		3	–	2	–	0
Fairmount		–		4	–	3	–	1
Detroit College		–		3	–	3	–	0
Lake Forest		–		4	–	4	–	1
Lincoln (MO)		–		1	–	1	–	0
Western Illinois		–		2	–	2	–	0
Wittenberg		–		3	–	4	–	2
Washburn		–		3	–	4	–	0
Doane		–		2	–	3	–	0
Heidelberg		–		3	–	5	–	1
Wabash		–		2	–	4	–	2
Buchtel		–		2	–	5	–	0
Washington University		–		2	–	6	–	1
Butler		–		1	–	3	–	0
Kansas State		–		2	–	6	–	0
Michigan State Normal		–		1	–	5	–	1
Iowa State Normal		–		1	–	6	–	1
Ohio		–		0	–	5	–	1

The 1902 Knox Old Siwash football team was an American football team that represented Knox College in the 1902 college football season. Knox compiled an impressive 9–2 record, shutting out seven opponents, and outscoring them 236 to 22.

== Schedule ==
Date	Opponent	Site	Result	Source
September 20	Rock Island Athletic Club	Galesburg, IL	W 46–0	
September 27	Upper Iowa	Galesburg, IL	W 45–0	
October 4	at Chicago	Marshall Field; Chicago, IL	L 0–5	
October 11	at Gem City	Quincy, IL	W 10–0	
October 17	Eureka	Galesburg, IL	W 18–0	
October 25	at Northwestern	Sheppard Field; Evanston, IL	W 15–0	
October 29	Kansas	Galesburg, IL	W 5–0	
November 8	vs. Notre Dame	Rock Island football park; Rock Island, IL	W 12–5	
October 15	at Nebraska	Antelope Field; Lincoln, NE	L 0–7	
October 21	Lombard	Galesburg, IL	W 17–0	
October 27	Chicago Dental	Galesburg, IL	W 68–5	
