= 1902 Lincoln Tigers football team =

American college football season

1902 Lincoln Tigers football

Disputed Black college national champion
- Conference: Independent
- Record: 2–1
- Captain: Smith
- Home stadium: Cottage Place Park

1902 Midwestern college football independents records
	Conf.			Overall
Team	W	L	T	W		L		T
Nebraska		–		9	–	0	–	0
South Dakota		–		9	–	0	–	0
North Dakota Agricultural		–		4	–	0	–	0
Central Michigan		–		4	–	0	–	0
Ohio Medical		–		9	–	1	–	0
Marquette		–		6	–	1	–	1
Knox		–		9	–	2	–	0
Northern Illinois State		–		5	–	1	–	1
Haskell		–		8	–	2	–	1
Notre Dame		–		6	–	2	–	1
Drake		–		5	–	2	–	1
Lincoln (MO)		–		2	–	1	–	0
Mount Union		–		6	–	3	–	0
Iowa State		–		6	–	3	–	1
Carthage		–		2	–	1	–	1
Cincinnati		–		4	–	2	–	2
Missouri		–		5	–	3	–	0
Miami (OH)		–		5	–	3	–	1
Kansas		–		6	–	4	–	0
South Dakota Agricultural		–		3	–	2	–	0
Fairmount		–		4	–	3	–	1
Detroit College		–		3	–	3	–	0
Lake Forest		–		4	–	4	–	1
Lincoln (MO)		–		1	–	1	–	0
Western Illinois		–		2	–	2	–	0
Wittenberg		–		3	–	4	–	2
Washburn		–		3	–	4	–	0
Doane		–		2	–	3	–	0
Heidelberg		–		3	–	5	–	1
Wabash		–		2	–	4	–	2
Buchtel		–		2	–	5	–	0
Washington University		–		2	–	6	–	1
Butler		–		1	–	3	–	0
Kansas State		–		2	–	6	–	0
Michigan State Normal		–		1	–	5	–	1
Iowa State Normal		–		1	–	6	–	1
Ohio		–		0	–	5	–	1

The 1902 Lincoln Tigers football team represented Lincoln Institute—now known as Lincoln University—in Jefferson City, Missouri as an independent during the 1902 college football season. The Lincoln football team finished the season with a record of 2–1. The annual matchup against fellow HBCU of mid-Missouri George R. Smith College resulted in an 18–5 win in favor of Lincoln. The Tigers were named the best black football team in the country, perhaps recognition of an early national title.

== Schedule ==
Date	Time	Opponent	Site	Result	Source
October 18	3:00 p.m.	Sumner High School	Cottage Place Park; Jefferson City, MO	W 12–0 (forfeit)	
November 1	3:30 p.m.	George R. Smith	Cottage Place Park; Jefferson City, MO	W 18–5	
November 15		Fisk	Fisk campus; Nashville, TN	L 0–11	
