= 1902 Buchtel football team =

American college football season

1902 Buchtel football
- Conference: Independent
- Record: 2–5
- Head coach: Forest Firestone (1st season)
- Captain: Lawrence Mihills

1902 Midwestern college football independents records
	Conf.			Overall
Team	W	L	T	W		L		T
Nebraska		–		9	–	0	–	0
South Dakota		–		9	–	0	–	0
North Dakota Agricultural		–		4	–	0	–	0
Central Michigan		–		4	–	0	–	0
Ohio Medical		–		9	–	1	–	0
Marquette		–		6	–	1	–	1
Knox		–		9	–	2	–	0
Northern Illinois State		–		5	–	1	–	1
Haskell		–		8	–	2	–	1
Notre Dame		–		6	–	2	–	1
Drake		–		5	–	2	–	1
Lincoln (MO)		–		2	–	1	–	0
Mount Union		–		6	–	3	–	0
Iowa State		–		6	–	3	–	1
Carthage		–		2	–	1	–	1
Cincinnati		–		4	–	2	–	2
Missouri		–		5	–	3	–	0
Miami (OH)		–		5	–	3	–	1
Kansas		–		6	–	4	–	0
South Dakota Agricultural		–		3	–	2	–	0
Fairmount		–		4	–	3	–	1
Detroit College		–		3	–	3	–	0
Lake Forest		–		4	–	4	–	1
Lincoln (MO)		–		1	–	1	–	0
Western Illinois		–		2	–	2	–	0
Wittenberg		–		3	–	4	–	2
Washburn		–		3	–	4	–	0
Doane		–		2	–	3	–	0
Heidelberg		–		3	–	5	–	1
Wabash		–		2	–	4	–	2
Buchtel		–		2	–	5	–	0
Washington University		–		2	–	6	–	1
Butler		–		1	–	3	–	0
Kansas State		–		2	–	6	–	0
Michigan State Normal		–		1	–	5	–	1
Iowa State Normal		–		1	–	6	–	1
Ohio		–		0	–	5	–	1

The 1902 Buchtel football team represented Buchtel College—now known as the University of Akron—as an independent during the 1902 college football season. Led by Forest Firestone in his first and only season as head coach, the team compiled a record of 2–5.

== Schedule ==
Date	Time	Opponent	Site	Result	Attendance	Source
October 11		at Mount Union	Hartshorn Field; Alliance, OH	L 0–21		
October 25		at Allegheny	Meadville, PA	L 6–23		
November 1	2:30 p.m.	Bethany (WV)	Buchtel field; Akron, OH	W 11–6	300–600	
November 8		Wooster	Buchtel field; Akron, OH	L 0–56		
November 15		Heidelberg	Buchtel field; Akron, OH	L 0–34		
November 22	2:30 p.m.	Hiram	Akron, OH	W 17–6		
November 27		at Heidelberg	Tiffin, OH	L 0–17		
