= 1902 Ohio Medical football team =

American college football season

1902 Ohio Medical football
- Conference: Independent
- Record: 9–1
- Head coach: John B. Eckstorm (1st season)
- Home stadium: Neil Park

1902 Midwestern college football independents records
	Conf.			Overall
Team	W	L	T	W		L		T
Nebraska		–		9	–	0	–	0
South Dakota		–		9	–	0	–	0
North Dakota Agricultural		–		4	–	0	–	0
Central Michigan		–		4	–	0	–	0
Ohio Medical		–		9	–	1	–	0
Marquette		–		6	–	1	–	1
Knox		–		9	–	2	–	0
Northern Illinois State		–		5	–	1	–	1
Haskell		–		8	–	2	–	1
Notre Dame		–		6	–	2	–	1
Drake		–		5	–	2	–	1
Lincoln (MO)		–		2	–	1	–	0
Mount Union		–		6	–	3	–	0
Iowa State		–		6	–	3	–	1
Carthage		–		2	–	1	–	1
Cincinnati		–		4	–	2	–	2
Missouri		–		5	–	3	–	0
Miami (OH)		–		5	–	3	–	1
Kansas		–		6	–	4	–	0
South Dakota Agricultural		–		3	–	2	–	0
Fairmount		–		4	–	3	–	1
Detroit College		–		3	–	3	–	0
Lake Forest		–		4	–	4	–	1
Lincoln (MO)		–		1	–	1	–	0
Western Illinois		–		2	–	2	–	0
Wittenberg		–		3	–	4	–	2
Washburn		–		3	–	4	–	0
Doane		–		2	–	3	–	0
Heidelberg		–		3	–	5	–	1
Wabash		–		2	–	4	–	2
Buchtel		–		2	–	5	–	0
Washington University		–		2	–	6	–	1
Butler		–		1	–	3	–	0
Kansas State		–		2	–	6	–	0
Michigan State Normal		–		1	–	5	–	1
Iowa State Normal		–		1	–	6	–	1
Ohio		–		0	–	5	–	1

The 1902 Ohio Medical football team was an American football team that represented the Ohio State University College of Medicine in the 1902 college football season. The medics compiled an impressive 9–1 record, shutting out eight opponents, and outscoring them 252 to 11. Their sole loss was against Notre Dame, who won by a single point, 6 to 5.

== Schedule ==
Date	Opponent	Site	Result	Source
September 27	Denison	Columbus, OH	W 6–0	
October 3	Otterbein	Columbus, OH	W 39–0	
October 11	Case	Cleveland, OH	W 15–0	
October 15	Wittenberg	Columbus, OH	W 40–0	
October 25	Washington & Jefferson	Neil Park; Columbus, OH	W 6–5	
November 1	Notre Dame	Columbus, OH	L 5–6	
November 7	Muskingum	Columbus, OH	W 45–0	
November 15	Shelby Athletic Club	Shelby, OH	W 16–0	
November 22	Ohio Northern	Columbus, OH	W 37–0	
November 27	Ohio Wesleyan	Columbus, OH	W 43–0	
