= 1902 Michigan State Normal Normalites football team =

American college football season

1902 Michigan State Normal Normalites football
- Conference: Independent
- Record: 1–5–1
- Head coach: Clayton Teetzel (3rd season)
- Captain: Fred A. Belland

1902 Midwestern college football independents records
| | Conf. | | | Overall |
| Team | W | L | T | W | | L | | T |
|---|---|---|---|---|---|---|---|---|
| Nebraska | | – | | 9 | – | 0 | – | 0 |
| South Dakota | | – | | 9 | – | 0 | – | 0 |
| North Dakota Agricultural | | – | | 4 | – | 0 | – | 0 |
| Central Michigan | | – | | 4 | – | 0 | – | 0 |
| Ohio Medical | | – | | 9 | – | 1 | – | 0 |
| Marquette | | – | | 6 | – | 1 | – | 1 |
| Knox | | – | | 9 | – | 2 | – | 0 |
| Northern Illinois State | | – | | 5 | – | 1 | – | 1 |
| Haskell | | – | | 8 | – | 2 | – | 1 |
| Notre Dame | | – | | 6 | – | 2 | – | 1 |
| Drake | | – | | 5 | – | 2 | – | 1 |
| Lincoln (MO) | | – | | 2 | – | 1 | – | 0 |
| Mount Union | | – | | 6 | – | 3 | – | 0 |
| Iowa State | | – | | 6 | – | 3 | – | 1 |
| Carthage | | – | | 2 | – | 1 | – | 1 |
| Cincinnati | | – | | 4 | – | 2 | – | 2 |
| Missouri | | – | | 5 | – | 3 | – | 0 |
| Miami (OH) | | – | | 5 | – | 3 | – | 1 |
| Kansas | | – | | 6 | – | 4 | – | 0 |
| South Dakota Agricultural | | – | | 3 | – | 2 | – | 0 |
| Fairmount | | – | | 4 | – | 3 | – | 1 |
| Detroit College | | – | | 3 | – | 3 | – | 0 |
| Lake Forest | | – | | 4 | – | 4 | – | 1 |
| Lincoln (MO) | | – | | 1 | – | 1 | – | 0 |
| Western Illinois | | – | | 2 | – | 2 | – | 0 |
| Wittenberg | | – | | 3 | – | 4 | – | 2 |
| Washburn | | – | | 3 | – | 4 | – | 0 |
| Doane | | – | | 2 | – | 3 | – | 0 |
| Heidelberg | | – | | 3 | – | 5 | – | 1 |
| Wabash | | – | | 2 | – | 4 | – | 2 |
| Buchtel | | – | | 2 | – | 5 | – | 0 |
| Washington University | | – | | 2 | – | 6 | – | 1 |
| Butler | | – | | 1 | – | 3 | – | 0 |
| Kansas State | | – | | 2 | – | 6 | – | 0 |
| Michigan State Normal | | – | | 1 | – | 5 | – | 1 |
| Iowa State Normal | | – | | 1 | – | 6 | – | 1 |
| Ohio | | – | | 0 | – | 5 | – | 1 |

The 1902 Michigan State Normal Normalites football team represented Michigan State Normal College (later renamed Eastern Michigan University) as an independent during the 1902 college football season. The Normalites compiled a record of 1–5–1 and were outscored by a combined total of 125 to 43. Fred A. Belland was the team captain.

Michigan State Normal College had 820 students enrolled as of October 3, 1902. The college celebrated the 50th anniversary of its founding on October 6, shortly before the football season began.

Clayton Teetzel returned as the team's head coach for the third year. One of the team's most promising prospects, Harry Smith, left the squad before the season began as he had to work at a local drug store when school was not in session.

Teetzel left the program after the 1902–03 academic year; he went on to coach football at Utah State Agricultural College from 1909 to 1915.

== Schedule ==
| Date | Opponent | Site | Result | Source |
|---|---|---|---|---|
| October 18 | at Detroit University School | Detroit, MI | L 0–16 | |
| October 25 | at Detroit Business University | Detroit, MI | W 32–0 | |
| November 1 | at Central Michigan | Mount Pleasant, MI (rivalry) | L 0–10 | |
| November 8 | Detroit Central High School | Ypsilanti, MI | T 6–6 | |
| November 15 | at Hillsdale | Hillsdale, MI | L 5–29 | |
| November 22 | Hillsdale | Ypsilanti, MI | L 0–22 | |
| November 27 | at Michigan School for the Deaf | Flint, MI | L 0–40 | |
