= Charles M. Hollister =

American football and baseball coach, college athletics administrator

Biographical details
- Born: September 2, 1867; North Pawlet, Vermont, U.S.
- Died: May 18, 1923 (aged 55); Chicago, Illinois, U.S.

Coaching career (HC unless noted)

Football
- 1896–1897: Beloit
- 1899–1902: Northwestern

Baseball
- 1896–1898: Beloit
- 1906: Northwestern

Administrative career (AD unless noted)
- 1898–1902: Northwestern

Head coaching record
- Overall: 33–21–6 (football); 31–18 (baseball)

Charles Marvin "Doc" Hollister (September 2, 1867 – May 18, 1923) was an American college football and college baseball coach and athletics administrator. He served as the head football coach at Beloit College from 1896 to 1897 and at Northwestern University from 1899 to 1902, compiling a career college football coaching record of 33–21–6. Hollister's record at Northwestern was 27–16–4. Hollister also served as the athletic director at Northwestern from 1898 to 1902 and as the school's baseball coach for one season in 1906, tallying a mark of 3–7.

== Head coaching record ==
=== Football ===
Year	Team	Overall	Conference	Standing	Bowl/playoffs
Beloit (Independent) (1896–1897)
1896	Beloit	2–2–2			
1897	Beloit	4–3			
Beloit:		6–5–2			
Northwestern Purple (Western Conference) (1899–1902)
1899	Northwestern	6–6	2–2	T–3rd	
1900	Northwestern	7–2–3	2–1–2	T–3rd	
1901	Northwestern	8–2–1	3–2	5th	
1902	Northwestern	6–6	0–4	T–8th	
Northwestern:		27–16–4	7–9–2		
Total:		33–21–6			
