= McCook Field (stadium) =

Stadium in Lawrence, Kansas

Coordinates: 38°57′49″N 95°14′47″W

- Interactive map of McCook Field
- Location: Lawrence, Kansas
- Owner: University of Kansas
- Operator: University of Kansas
- Capacity: 15,000

Construction
- Opened: 1892; 134 years ago
- Closed: 1920; 106 years ago
- Demolished: May 10, 1921; 105 years ago

Tenants
- Kansas Jayhawks football (1892–1920); Kansas Jayhawks baseball (1892–1920)

McCook Field was a stadium in Lawrence, Kansas. It hosted the University of Kansas Jayhawks football team until they moved to Memorial Stadium in 1921. The stadium held 15,000 people at its peak and was opened in 1892. The stadium was financed by John James McCook. The Jayhawks current stadium, David Booth Kansas Memorial Stadium, was built at the site of McCook Field.

== History and home field advantage ==
Kansas enjoyed much success in the years they played at McCook. In the 29 seasons at McCook, they compiled a home record of 101-23-8. Multiple coaching legends coached the Jayhawks during their tenure at McCook included Fielding Yost, who won 6 national championships at Michigan. He led Kansas to a 10–0 record in 1899, going 6–0 at McCook. John Outland, for whom the Outland trophy is named, coached the 1901 season and was 2–2 at home. A.R. "Bert" Kennedy, the winningest coach in KU football history, coached all of his seasons while McCook was the home field. His record at McCook was 32-3-1, including defeats against Nebraska, Notre Dame, Arkansas, and Oklahoma at McCook field. College basketball coaching legend Phog Allen coached the football team at McCook. Allen was undefeated at home, going 4-0-1.
