= 1901 college football rankings =

- Season: 1901
- Bowl season: 1901–02 bowl games
- End of season champions: Princeton

The 1901 college football season rankings included a ranking by Caspar Whitney for Outing.

== Caspar Whitney ==
Writing for Outing, alongside his All-America Eleven for 1901, Caspar Whitney ranked the top twenty teams in the country at the conclusion of the season.

Whitney is designated by the National Collegiate Athletic Association (NCAA) as a "major selector" of national championships, and his contemporary rankings in Outing for 1905–1907 are included in the NCAA college football records book.

Rank	Team	Record
1	Harvard	12–0
2	Yale	11–1–1
3	Michigan	11–0
4	Wisconsin	9–0
5	Army	5–1–2
6	Princeton	9–1–1
7	Cornell	11–1
8	Wisconsin	9–3
9	Navy	6–4–1
10	Syracuse	7–1
11	Columbia	8–5
12	Pennsylvania	10–5
13	Minnesota	9–1–1
14	Dartmouth	10–1
15	Williams	6–4
16	Northwestern	8–2–1
17	Illinois	8–2
18	Chicago	8–6–2
19	Iowa	6–3
20	Tennessee	3–3–2

== See also ==
- 1901 College Football All-America Team
