= 1900 Western Conference football season =

American college football season

- Sport: Football
- Teams: 9
- Co-champions: Minnesota, Iowa

Football seasons
- ← 1899 1901 →

1900 Western Conference football standings
| | Conf. | | | | | Overall |
| Team | W | | L | | T | W | | L | | T |
|---|---|---|---|---|---|---|---|---|---|---|
| Minnesota + | 3 | – | 0 | – | 1 | 10 | – | 0 | – | 2 |
| Iowa + | 2 | – | 0 | – | 1 | 7 | – | 0 | – | 1 |
| Wisconsin | 2 | – | 1 | – | 0 | 8 | – | 1 | – | 0 |
| Michigan | 3 | – | 2 | – | 0 | 7 | – | 2 | – | 1 |
| Northwestern | 2 | – | 1 | – | 2 | 7 | – | 2 | – | 3 |
| Chicago | 2 | – | 3 | – | 1 | 9 | – | 5 | – | 1 |
| Indiana | 1 | – | 2 | – | 1 | 4 | – | 2 | – | 2 |
| Illinois | 1 | – | 3 | – | 2 | 7 | – | 3 | – | 2 |
| Purdue | 0 | – | 4 | – | 0 | 4 | – | 4 | – | 0 |
+ – Conference co-champions

The 1900 Western Conference football season was the fifth season of college football played by the member schools of the Western Conference (later known as the Big Ten Conference) and was a part of the 1900 college football season. This was the first season the league expanded, as Indiana and Iowa began competing for the conference title.

The 1900 Minnesota Golden Gophers and Iowa Hawkeyes football teams tied for the conference championship, the first Western/Big Ten title for both programs. Minnesota, under head coach Henry L. Williams, compiled a 10–0–2 record, shut out nine opponents, and outscored all opponents by a combined total of 299 to 23. Iowa, under head coach Alden Knipe, compiled a 7–0–1 record and led the conference in scoring offense with an average of 38.9 points per game. The 1900 Wisconsin Badgers, under head coach Philip King, placed third in the conference, compiled an 8–1 record (its only loss being to Minnesota by a 7–6 score), shut out seven of nine opponents, and led the conference in scoring defense with an average of 1.2 points allowed per game.

== Season overview ==
=== Results and team statistics ===
| Conf. Rank | Team | Head coach | Overall record | Conf. record | PPG | PAG |
|---|---|---|---|---|---|---|
| 1 (tie) | Minnesota | Henry L. Williams | 10-0-2 | 3-0-1 | 24.9 | 1.9 |
| 1 (tie) | Iowa | Alden Knipe | 7–0–1 | 2–0–1 | 38.9 | 1.5 |
| 3 | Wisconsin | Philip King | 8–1 | 2–1 | 33.3 | 1.2 |
| 4 | Michigan | Langdon Lea | 7–2–1 | 3–2 | 11.7 | 5.5 |
| 5 | Northwestern | Charles Hollister | 7–2–3 | 2–1–2 | 9.3 | 4.1 |
| 6 | Chicago | Amos A. Stagg | 9–5–1 | 2–3–1 | 13.6 | 9.0 |
| 7 | Indiana | James H. Horne | 4–2–2 | 1–2–1 | 13.8 | 3.6 |
| 8 | Illinois | Fred Smith | 7–3–2 | 1–3–2 | 15.3 | 5.6 |
| 9 | Purdue | Alpha Jamison | 4–4 | 0–4 | 21.5 | 9.9 |

Key

PPG = Average of points scored per game
PAG = Average of points allowed per game

=== Regular season ===
The following conference games were played during the 1900 Western Conference season:

- October 6: Chicago defeated Purdue, 17–5, at Chicago
- October 13: Minnesota tied Chicago, 6–6, at Minneapolis
- October 13: Northwestern defeated Indiana, 12–0, at Evanston, Illinois
- October 20: Michigan defeated Purdue, 11–6, at Ann Arbor, Michigan
- October 20: Northwestern tied Illinois, 0–0, at Evanston, Illinois
- October 27: Michigan defeated Illinois, 12–0, at Chicago
- November 2: Iowa defeated Chicago, 17–0, at Chicago
- November 3: Minnesota defeated Wisconsin, 6–5, at Minneapolis
- November 3: Michigan defeated Indiana, 12–0, at Ann Arbor, Michigan
- November 3: Iowa defeated Chicago, 17–0, at Chicago
- November 3: Illinois defeated Purdue, 17–5, at Champaign, Illinois
- November 10: Minnesota defeated Illinois, 23–0, at Minneapolis
- November 10: Iowa defeated Michigan, 28–5, at Detroit
- November 10: Northwestern defeated Chicago, 5–0, at Chicago
- November 17: Minnesota defeated Northwestern, 21–0, at Minneapolis
- November 17: Wisconsin defeated Chicago, 39–5, at Chicago
- November 24: Wisconsin defeated Illinois, 27–0, at Madison, Wisconsin
- November 27: Indiana tied Illinois, 0–0, at Indianapolis
- November 28: Chicago defeated Michigan, 15–6, at Chicago
- November 29: Iowa tied Northwestern, 5–5, at Rock Island, Illinois
- November 29: Indiana defeated Purdue, 24–5, at West Lafayette, Indiana

Notable non-conference games during the 1900 season included the following:

- October 6: Minnesota defeated Iowa State, 27–0, at Minneapolis
- October 20: Chicago lost to Brown, 11–6, at Chicago
- October 25: Indiana defeated Notre Dame, 6–0, at Bloomington, Indiana
- October 26: Iowa defeated Drake, 26–0, at Iowa City, Iowa
- October 27: Minnesota defeated North Dakota, 34–0, at Minneapolis
- October 27: Chicago lost to Penn, 41–0, at Philadelphia
- November 10: Wisconsin defeated Notre Dame, 54–0, at Madison, Wisconsin
- November 17: Michigan defeated Notre Dame, 7–0, at Ann Arbor, Michigan
- November 24: Michigan tied Ohio State, 0–0, at Ann Arbor, Michigan
- November 29: Minnesota defeated Nebraska, 20–12, at Lincoln, Nebraska

=== Bowl games ===
No bowl games were played during the 1900 season.

== Awards and honors ==
=== All-Western players ===
In 1900, an All-Western football team was selected by Caspar Whitney (CW) in Outing magazine as follows:

| Position | Name | Team | Selectors |
|---|---|---|---|
| End | Beyer Aune | Minnesota | CW |
| End | Neil Snow | Michigan | CW |
| Tackle | Arthur Hale Curtis | Wisconsin | CW |
| Tackle | Joe Warner | Iowa | CW |
| Guard | Jerry Riordan | Wisconsin | CW |
| Guard | Cyrus E. Dietz | Northwestern | CW |
| Center | Leroy Albert Page, Jr. | Minnesota | CW |
| Quarterback | Gil Dobie | Minnesota | CW |
| Halfback | Henry | Chicago | CW |
| Halfback | Al Larson | Wisconsin | CW |
| Fullback | Warren Cummings Knowlton | Minnesota | CW |

=== All-Americans ===
No Western Conference players received first-team All-America honors in 1900. However, two players received third-team honors on Walter Camp's All-America team for 1900. They were center Page of Minnesota and quarterback Clyde Williams of Iowa.
