= 1901 Western Conference football season =

American college football season

- Sport: Football
- Number of teams: 9
- Co-champions: Michigan, Wisconsin

Football seasons
- ← 1900 1902 →

1901 Western Conference football standings
	Conf.					Overall
Team	W		L		T	W		L		T
Michigan +	4	–	0	–	0	11	–	0	–	0
Wisconsin +	2	–	0	–	0	9	–	0	–	0
Minnesota	3	–	1	–	0	9	–	1	–	1
Illinois	4	–	2	–	0	8	–	2	–	0
Northwestern	3	–	2	–	0	8	–	2	–	1
Indiana	1	–	2	–	0	6	–	3	–	0
Purdue	0	–	3	–	1	4	–	4	–	1
Chicago	0	–	4	–	1	8	–	6	–	2
Iowa	0	–	3	–	0	6	–	3	–	0
+ – Conference co-champions

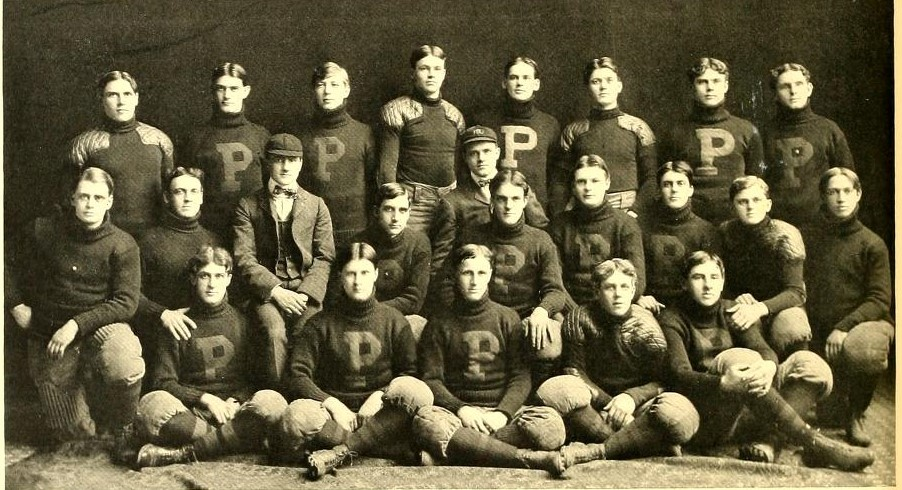
Portrait of the 1901 Purdue American football team.

The 1901 Western Conference football season was the sixth season of college football played by the member schools of the Western Conference (later known as the Big Ten Conference) and was a part of the 1901 college football season.

In its first year under head coach Fielding H. Yost, Michigan compiled a perfect 11–0 record, outscored its opponents by a combined total of 550 to 0, and defeated Stanford by a 49 to 0 score in the inaugural Rose Bowl game, the first college bowl game ever played. Three of the five official selectors, the Helms Athletic Foundation, the Houlgate System, and the National Championship Foundation, recognize the 1901 Michigan team as the national champion.

Wisconsin, under head coach Philip King, tied with Michigan for the conference championship with a 9–0 record, shut out seven of nine opponents, and outscored all opponents 317 to 5.

== Season overview ==
=== Results and team statistics ===
Conf. Rank	Team	Head coach	Overall record	Conf. record	PPG	PAG
1 (tie)	Michigan	Fielding H. Yost	11–0	4–0	50.0	0.0
1 (tie)	Wisconsin	Philip King	9–0	2–0	35.2	0.6
3	Minnesota	Henry L. Williams	9-1-1	3-1	16.6	1.6
4	Illinois	Justa Lindgren	8–2	4–2	24.3	3.9
5	Northwestern	Charles Hollister	8–2–1	3–2	14.6	7.0
6	Indiana	James H. Horne	6–3	1–2	23.8	9.7
7	Purdue	D. M. Balliet	4–4–1	0–3–1	15.3	7.3
8	Chicago	Amos A. Stagg	8–6–2	0–4–1	10.9	8.2
9	Iowa	Alden Knipe	6–3	0–3	9.4	12.8

Key

PPG = Average of points scored per game
PAG = Average of points allowed per game

=== Regular season ===
During the 1901 season, Western Conference teams played 18 games against each other, as follows:

==== October 12 ====
- Chicago and Purdue played to a 5–5 in Chicago
- Michigan defeated Indiana, 33–0

==== October 19 ====
- Illinois defeated Chicago, 24–0
- Michigan defeated Northwestern, 29–0

==== October 26 ====
- Indiana defeated Purdue, 11–6
- Minnesota defeated Iowa, 16–0
- Northwestern defeated Illinois, 17–11

==== November 2 ====
- Illinois defeated Indiana, 18–0

==== November 9 ====
- Illinois defeated Iowa, 27–0
- Northwestern defeated Chicago,

==== November 16 ====
- Illinois defeated Purdue, 28–6
- Michigan defeated Chicago, 22–0
- Wisconsin defeated Minnesota, 18–0

==== November 23 ====
- Minnesota defeated Northwestern, 16–0

==== November 28 (Thanksgiving) ====
- Michigan defeated Iowa, 50–0
- Minnesota defeated Illinois, 16–0
- Northwestern defeated Purdue, 10–5
- Wisconsin defeated Chicago, 35–0

=== Bowl games ===
Michigan defeated Stanford, 49–0, in the 1902 Rose Bowl.

== Awards and honors ==
=== All-Western players ===
The following Western Conference players were selected as first-team players on the 1901 All-Western college football team by at least two of the following selectors: Chicago American (CA), Chicago Daily News (CDN), Chicago Record-Herald (CRH), Chicago Tribune (CT), and Walter Camp (WC):

- William Juneau, end, Wisconsin (CA, CDN, CRH, CT, WC)
- Neil Snow, end/fullback, Michigan (CA, CDN, CRH, WC)
- Bruce Shorts, tackle, Michigan (CA, CRH, CT, WC)
- Arthur Hale Curtis, tackle, Wisconsin (CA, CDN, CRH, CT)
- John G. Flynn, guard, Minnesota (CA, CRH, WC)
- Jake Stahl, guard, Illinois (CA, CDN, CRH, CT)
- Fred Lowenthal, center, Illinois (CA, CT, WC)
- Leroy Albert Page, Jr., center, Minnesota (CDN, CRH)
- Boss Weeks, quarterback, Michigan (CA, CDN, CRH, WC)
- Willie Heston, halfback, Michigan (CA, CRH, WC)
- Al Larson, halfback, Wisconsin (CA, CDN, CRH, CT, WC)
- Everett Sweeley, fullback/halfback, Michigan (CDN, CT)
- G. O. Dietz, fullback/guard, Northwestern (CDN, WC)
- Earl Driver, fullback, Wisconsin (CA, CRH)

=== All-Americans ===
Only one Western Conference player was selected as a first-team player on the 1901 College Football All-America Team:

- Neil Snow, end, Michigan, selected by Caspar Whitneypublished in Outing magazine
