= Alden Knipe =

American football player and coach (1870–1950)

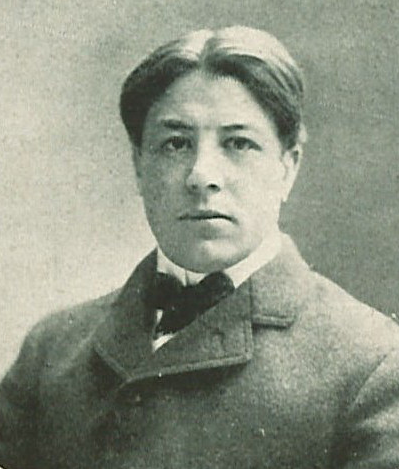
- Knipe from the 1902 Hawkeye

Biographical details
- Born: June 1870; Pennsylvania, U.S.
- Died: May 22, 1950 (aged 79); New York, New York, U.S.

Playing career

Football
- 1892–1894: Penn
- Positions: Halfback, quarterback

Coaching career (HC unless noted)

Football
- 1895–1896: Penn (assistant)
- 1898–1902: Iowa

Baseball
- 1900–1901: Iowa

Head coaching record
- Overall: 29–11–4 (football); 25–8 (baseball)

Accomplishments and honors

Awards
- Consensus All-American (1894)

Alden Arthur Knipe (June 1870 – May 22, 1950) was an American football player and coach. He served as the sixth head football coach at the University of Iowa, serving from 1898 to 1902 and compiling a record of 30–11–4. Knipe was also the first head baseball coach at Iowa, coaching two seasons from 1900 to 1901 and tallying a mark 25–8. Knipe played college football at the University of Pennsylvania. After retiring from coaching, he authored numerous books for children.

== Playing career ==
Knipe was one of the great football players of the nineteenth century. He played at the University of Pennsylvania for the legendary George Washington Woodruff. In 1893, Knipe scored a touchdown for the Penn Quakers in a game against a Walter Camp-coached Yale team. It was the first points Yale had surrendered since 1890, a span of 35 consecutive games. Some sources attribute the famous touchdown to fellow Penn halfback Winchester Osgood, not Knipe.

In 1894, Knipe was the team captain for the Quakers, leading Penn to a perfect 12–0 record. For his efforts, Knipe, a halfback and quarterback, was named as a first team All-American that season. The 1894 Penn squad featured a very talented backfield that consisted of Carl S. Williams at quarterback, George H. Brooke at fullback and Winchester Osgood and Knipe at halfback. Both Osgood and Brooke were also named first team All-American that year. Woodruff later called Knipe "the greatest player I ever coached."

== Coaching career ==
Knipe then served for two years as an assistant coach under Woodruff at Penn while earning his degree in medicine. In 1897, Knipe moved to Iowa City. The University of Iowa offered him fifty dollars a month to coach the Hawkeye football team in 1898.

=== Previous Iowa coaches ===
Knipe was the first head football coach at Iowa to helm the football team for more than a single season, though five coaches preceded him. Iowa first recognized a varsity football team in 1889 and went without a head coach until 1892. School officials hired Edwin A. Dalton of Princeton University for ten days prior to the 1892 season to assemble and organize the team, making him Iowa's first head football coach.

Ben "Sport" Donnelly of Princeton was hired for two weeks prior to the 1893 season. Unlike Dalton, Donnelly was generally disliked by the Hawkeye players. As a result, Iowa turned away from Princeton and hired Roger Sherman of the University of Michigan in 1894. Sherman was the first Hawkeye coach to coach the entire season.

In 1895, Iowa nearly did not field an official team, as the school athletic board ruled that recognition would not be granted until the team paid off its debts. Emergency fundraising allowed the team to be financed and recognized, but Iowa decided not to hire a head coach in 1895. Practices were sloppy and disorganized, and Iowa stumbled to a 2–5 record and failed to score in all five losses. Iowa football would never again go without a head coach.

School officials hired Alfred E. Bull of the University of Pennsylvania to coach the 1896 squad. The 1896 Hawkeye team went 7–1–1 and won Iowa's first conference title, claiming the Western Interstate University Football Association crown in Iowa's final year in the conference. The Hawkeyes were led in scoring by Frank Holbrook, the first black football player at Iowa. Bull's success led school officials to hire more coaches from the University of Pennsylvania, including Otto Wagonhurst in 1897 and Knipe in 1898.

=== Early years ===
Knipe was a stern disciplinarian, and friction soon arose between Knipe and the older players of the 1898 team, who resented Knipe's instruction and wanted some control over what positions players played. Iowa started the 1898 season 1–4–1, and after a loss to Northern Iowa, Ralph Blackmore led the "Blackmore Revolt", in which five players quit the team. Knipe simply started younger players, including Clyde Williams and Joe Warner. These younger players would be the backbone of success to follow. Iowa closed the year 2–0–1, ending the season with a 6–5 victory over rival Nebraska. Nebraska had been a heavy favorite and was coached by Fielding H. Yost.

Iowa's finish validated Knipe, and school officials announced that Knipe would stay in Iowa City. He coached the 1899 Iowa track team in the spring and the 1899 football team that fall. Knipe guided the track team to the 1899 state championship. Before the 1899 football season, Knipe, an accomplished singer and director of Iowa's glee club, sang in a school production of the operetta The Mikado. It raised $400 for the school's athletic fund.

After a season opening win over Northern Iowa in 1899, the Hawkeyes turned their attention to heavily favored Chicago, coached by Amos Alonzo Stagg. Iowa's Billy Edson, an Iowa State transfer, scored a touchdown against Chicago, while the Maroons could muster only a field goal. Since both were scored as five points in those days, Iowa settled for a 5–5 tie. Chicago would go on to win the 1899 Western Conference title with a 12–0–2 record.

Hawkeye fans were ecstatic with the tie. Iowa would not yield another point all year, winning their last seven games by a combined score of 194–0. In Iowa's final game of the season, the Hawkeyes defeated Illinois in their first ever meeting by a 58–0 score. So outmatched were the Illini that both sides agreed to shorten the second half by ten minutes.

Less than 24 hours later, Arthur G. Smith, Iowa's football team captain in 1890, accepted on behalf of the University of Iowa an invitation for membership in the Western Conference. Iowa has participated in the Western Conference, now known as the Big Ten Conference, since 1900.

=== Big Ten membership ===
Before the 1900 season, the University of Iowa appointed Knipe to a position titled "Director of Physical Culture". Knipe oversaw all Iowa intercollegiate athletics at the time in this director of athletics role. He is occasionally referred to as Iowa's first athletic director, though the University of Iowa does not officially recognize the position until 1910, when it was split from the head football coaching duties for the first time.

Nine starters from Iowa's undefeated 1899 team returned for the 1900 season, including Williams, Warner, Edson, John G. Griffith, Ray "Buck" Morton, and Morey Eby, captain of the 1899 squad. Griffith was appointed captain in 1900.

The Hawkeyes won their first four non-conference games by a combined score of 198–0. Chicago loomed as Iowa's first ever Western Conference opponent. Chicago had won the conference the previous year and handed Iowa its only blemish on the season in 1899. After a scoreless first half, the Hawks scored two quick touchdowns early in the second period and Iowa won, 17–0. Iowa's next game was against Michigan, the 1898 Western Conference champions, in Detroit. The Wolverines had sent scouts to watch the Iowa-Chicago game and prepare for Michigan's first ever meeting with Iowa.

Knipe had the Hawkeye players gather at Lake St. Clair outside Detroit. Knipe taught his Hawkeye team 75 new plays in one week. He completely changed his offense, which had been one of power inside running, to exploit Iowa's speed advantage running outside the tackles. The Hawkeyes led 28–0 before Michigan managed a field goal to prevent the shutout, the first points scored on Iowa in 1900. But the Hawkeyes dominated the Wolverines and won, 28–5.

A controversial tie in Iowa's last game against Northwestern was the only blemish on the 1900 season. Every member of the Iowa team except Griffith had creamed potatoes the day before the game, and Griffith was the only member of the team without severe stomach cramps the night before the game. Rumor has it that the hotel chef had a wager on the game. Iowa scored a first half touchdown against the Wildcats, but Northwestern scored a late field goal, and Iowa settled for the 5–5 tie. That was still good enough to salvage a tie for the league title with Minnesota in Iowa's first year in the conference.

Knipe, who was appointed Iowa's first director of music in 1901, put on another performance of The Mikado in the off-season. Only three starters returned in 1901, but arguably Iowa's best player, Clyde Williams, was one of them and was named team captain. The Hawkeyes won their first three games of the season before preparing to play fellow 1900 conference champion, Minnesota. 25 minutes before the game, Williams was told he was ineligible to play, because he had played professional summer baseball. A deflated Hawkeye team lost to Minnesota, 16–0, losing their first game and yielding their first touchdown in 23 games. Iowa had a 6–3 record in 1901.

Knipe had a large, early influence on Iowa athletics. He served as Iowa's coach for track and cross country from 1899 to 1902, and he was Iowa's first baseball coach from 1900 to 1901. In addition to serving as Iowa's director of music and Iowa's director of athletics, he is the only person in the history of the university to coach four separate sports (football, track, baseball, and cross country) simultaneously.

In 1902, Iowa's football team went 5–4, but lost to Michigan and Illinois by a combined score of 187–0. After the 1902 season, Knipe was married in Philadelphia. It was his second marriage, and some on the Athletic Board suggested to the coach that he should not marry a second time because "whispered talk such a marriage would provoke would be bad for Iowa." Regardless, Knipe did it, and he tendered his resignation after the season as well. Knipe had a five-year record of 30–11–4 at Iowa. He never coached again.

== Later years and death ==
As an accomplished singer with a degree in medicine, Knipe chose to be neither a singer nor a doctor. While in college at Penn he had been a member of the prestigious Delta Psi fraternity, AKA St. Anthony Hall. For the next 47 years, Knipe and his wife wrote and illustrated 32 children's books. Using the pen name Timothy Shea, he wrote an adult novel, Sarah and Son, which was made into a successful motion picture of the same name for the popular Hollywood star, Ruth Chatterton. He died in New York in 1950 at age 79.

== Head coaching record ==
=== Football ===
| Year | Team | Overall | Conference | Standing | Bowl/playoffs |
|---|---|---|---|---|---|
Iowa Hawkeyes (Independent) (1898–1899)
| 1898 | Iowa | 3–4–2 | | | |
| 1899 | Iowa | 8–0–1 | | | |
Iowa Hawkeyes (Western Conference) (1900–1902)
| 1900 | Iowa | 7–0–1 | 2–0–1 | T–1st | |
| 1901 | Iowa | 6–3 | 0–3 | 9th | |
| 1902 | Iowa | 5–4 | 0–3 | 7th | |
| Iowa: | | 29–11–4 | 2–6–1 | | |
| Total: | | 29–11–4 | | | |
