= 1900 Iowa Hawkeyes football team =

American college football season

1900 Iowa Hawkeyes football

Western Conference co-champion
- Conference: Western Conference
- Record: 7–0–1 (2–0–1 Western)
- Head coach: Alden Knipe (3rd season)
- Captain: John G. Griffith
- Home stadium: Iowa Field

1900 Western Conference football standings
	Conf.					Overall
Team	W		L		T	W		L		T
Minnesota +	3	–	0	–	1	10	–	0	–	2
Iowa +	2	–	0	–	1	7	–	0	–	1
Wisconsin	2	–	1	–	0	8	–	1	–	0
Michigan	3	–	2	–	0	7	–	2	–	1
Northwestern	2	–	1	–	2	7	–	2	–	3
Chicago	2	–	3	–	1	9	–	5	–	1
Indiana	1	–	2	–	1	4	–	2	–	2
Illinois	1	–	3	–	2	7	–	3	–	2
Purdue	0	–	4	–	0	4	–	4	–	0
+ – Conference co-champions

The 1900 Iowa Hawkeyes football team was an American football team that represented the State University of Iowa ("S.U.I."), now commonly known as the University of Iowa, as a member of the Western Conference during the 1900 Western Conference football season. In their third year under head coach Alden Knipe, the Hawkeyes compiled a 7–0–1 record (2–0–1 in conference games), tied with Minnesota for the Western Conference championship, shut out their first five opponents, and outscored all opponents by a total of 311 to 12. This was the Hawkeyes' second consecutive undefeated season and their first season in the Western Conference.

Quarterback Clyde Williams and tackle Joe Warner received first-team All-Big Ten honors. Williams was later inducted into the Iowa Letterwinners Club Hall of Fame. Fullback John G. Griffith was the team captain.

The team played its home games at Iowa Field in Iowa City, Iowa.

== Schedule ==
Date	Opponent	Site	Result	Attendance	Source
September 28	Upper Iowa*	Iowa Field; Iowa City, IA	W 57–0		
October 6	Iowa State Normal*	Iowa Field; Iowa City, IA	W 68–0		
October 13	Simpson*	Iowa Field; Iowa City, IA	W 47–0		
October 19	at Iowa State	State Field; Ames, IA (rivalry)	Cancelled ^{A}		
October 26	Drake*	Iowa Field; Iowa City, IA	W 26–0		
November 3	at Chicago	Marshall Field; Chicago, IL	W 17–0		
November 10	vs. Michigan	Bennett Park; Detroit, MI	W 28–5	5,000	
November 17	Grinnell*	Iowa Field; Iowa City, IA	W 63–2		
November 29	vs. Northwestern	Rock Island, IL	T 5–5		
*Non-conference game

== Personnel ==
=== Players ===
- James Brockway
- Emett Burrier
- George Coulthard
- Charles Dye
- Willis Edson
- Asher Ely
- John G. Griffith, fullback
- Ernest Little
- Ray Morton
- Frank Siberts
- Joe Warner, tackle
- Bert Watters
- Clyde Williams, quarterback

=== Coaches and administrators ===
- Alden Knipe, head coach and director of athletics
- Sam Hobbs, assistant coach
- Fred C. McCutchen, manager
