= 1900 Indiana Hoosiers football team =

American college fooall season

1900 Indiana Hoosiers football
- Conference: Western Conference
- Record: 4–2–2 (1–2–1 Western)
- Head coach: James H. Horne (3rd season)
- Captain: John Foster
- Home stadium: Jordan Field

1900 Western Conference football standings
	Conf.					Overall
Team	W		L		T	W		L		T
Minnesota +	3	–	0	–	1	10	–	0	–	2
Iowa +	2	–	0	–	1	7	–	0	–	1
Wisconsin	2	–	1	–	0	8	–	1	–	0
Michigan	3	–	2	–	0	7	–	2	–	1
Northwestern	2	–	1	–	2	7	–	2	–	3
Chicago	2	–	3	–	1	9	–	5	–	1
Indiana	1	–	2	–	1	4	–	2	–	2
Illinois	1	–	3	–	2	7	–	3	–	2
Purdue	0	–	4	–	0	4	–	4	–	0
+ – Conference co-champions

The 1900 Indiana Hoosiers football team was an American football team that represented Indiana University Bloomington during the 1900 Western Conference football season. In their third season under head coach James H. Horne, the Hoosiers compiled a 4–2–2 record and outscored their opponents by a combined total of 110 to 29. Indiana won the State football championship against Purdue University that year, cementing the in-state rivalry between the two teams.

== Schedule ==
Date	Time	Opponent	Site	Result	Attendance	Source
September 29		Indiana alumni*	Jordan Field; Bloomington, IN	T 0–0		
October 6		Earlham*	Jordan Field; Bloomington, IN	W 18–0		
October 13		at Northwestern	Sheppard Field; Evanston, IL	L 0–12		
October 17		Vincennes*	Jordan Field; Bloomington, IN	W 62–0		
October 25		Notre Dame*	Jordan Field; Bloomington, IN	W 6–0		
November 3		at Michigan	Regents Field; Ann Arbor, MI	L 0–12	2,000	
November 17	2:45 p.m.	vs. Illinois	Newby Oval; Indianapolis, IN (rivalry)	T 0–0	3,000	
November 29		at Purdue	Stuart Field; West Lafayette, IN (rivalry)	W 24–5		
*Non-conference game

== Personnel ==
=== Roster ===
Name	Position	Year
Huddle	Line	(22)
John A. Foster (C)	Quarterback	Junior
Alvah J. Rucker		
E. B. Elfers	Left Guard	(21)
Max Hawley	Fullback	(21)
Hurley	Center	(22)
Zora Goodwin Clevenger	Left Halfback	Freshman
George Teter	Right Halfback	(26)
Phelps F. Darby	Back	(22)
Roy O. Pike	Right Guard	(24)
William Sparks	Left Tackle	(22)
D. O. McGovney	Left End	(22)
E. J. Smith	Right End	(22)
Harry R. Davidson	Right Tackle	Junior
Thomas W. Records	Line	(24)
Markle	Line	(20)
Gordon	Line	(21)
Coble	Line	(18)
Tillson	Line	(22)

=== Staffing ===
- James Howard Horne, Head coach and manager
- J. Clark Hubbard, Assistant coach and assistant manager
- D. C. MacAndrews, Assistant coach
- Evarts Wrenn, Assistant coach
