= 1901 Iowa Hawkeyes football team =

American college football season

1901 Iowa Hawkeyes football
- Conference: Western Conference
- Record: 6–3 (0–3 Western)
- Head coach: Alden Knipe (4th season)
- Captain: Clyde Williams
- Home stadium: Iowa Field

1901 Western Conference football standings
	Conf.					Overall
Team	W		L		T	W		L		T
Michigan +	4	–	0	–	0	11	–	0	–	0
Wisconsin +	2	–	0	–	0	9	–	0	–	0
Minnesota	3	–	1	–	0	9	–	1	–	1
Illinois	4	–	2	–	0	8	–	2	–	0
Northwestern	3	–	2	–	0	8	–	2	–	1
Indiana	1	–	2	–	0	6	–	3	–	0
Purdue	0	–	3	–	1	4	–	4	–	1
Chicago	0	–	4	–	1	8	–	6	–	2
Iowa	0	–	3	–	0	6	–	3	–	0
+ – Conference co-champions

The 1901 Iowa Hawkeyes football team was an American football team that represented that represented the State University of Iowa ("S.U.I."), now commonly known as the University of Iowa, as a member of the Western Conference during the 1901 Western Conference football season. In their fourth season under head coach Alden Knipe, the Hawkeyes compiled a 6–3 record (0–3 in conference games), finished in last place in the Western Conference, and were outscored by a total of 115 to 85. Clyde Williams was the team captain.

The team's loss to Minnesota on October 26 ended a 23-game unbeaten streak dating back to November 1898.

== Schedule ==
Date	Opponent	Site	Result	Attendance	Source
October 5	Iowa State Normal*	Iowa Field; Iowa City, IA	W 16–0		
October 11	at Drake*	South Ninth Street grounds; Des Moines, IA	W 6–5	2,000	
October 18	Iowa State*	Iowa Field; Iowa City, IA (rivalry)	W 12–0		
October 26	at Minnesota	Northrop Field; Minneapolis, MN (rivalry)	L 0–16	10,000	
October 30	Coe*	Iowa Field; Iowa City, IA	W 11–0		
November 2	Knox (IL)*	Iowa Field; Iowa City, IA	W 23–6		
November 9	Illinois	Iowa Field; Iowa City, IA	L 0–27	5,000	
November 16	Grinnell*	Iowa Field; Iowa City, IA	W 17–11		
November 28	vs. Michigan	National League Baseball Park; Chicago, IL	L 0–50	10,000	
*Non-conference game
