= 1901 Purdue Boilermakers football team =

American college football season

1901 Purdue Boilermakers football
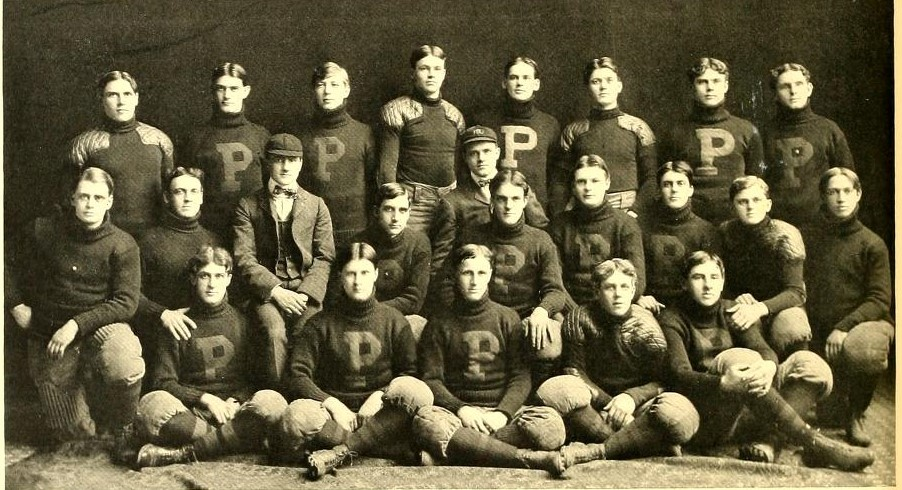
- Conference: Western Conference
- Record: 4–4–1 (0–3–1 Western)
- Head coach: D. M. Balliet (4th season)
- Captain: John F. G. Miller
- Home stadium: Stuart Field

1901 Western Conference football standings
	Conf.					Overall
Team	W		L		T	W		L		T
Michigan +	4	–	0	–	0	11	–	0	–	0
Wisconsin +	2	–	0	–	0	9	–	0	–	0
Minnesota	3	–	1	–	0	9	–	1	–	1
Illinois	4	–	2	–	0	8	–	2	–	0
Northwestern	3	–	2	–	0	8	–	2	–	1
Indiana	1	–	2	–	0	6	–	3	–	0
Purdue	0	–	3	–	1	4	–	4	–	1
Chicago	0	–	4	–	1	8	–	6	–	2
Iowa	0	–	3	–	0	6	–	3	–	0
+ – Conference co-champions

The 1901 Purdue Boilermakers football team was an American football team that represented Purdue University during the 1901 Western Conference football season. The Boilermakers compiled a 4–4–1 record and outscored their opponents by a total of 138 to 66 in their fourth, non-consecutive season under head coach D. M. Balliet. John F. G. Miller was the team captain.

While Purdue credits Balliet as head coach for 1901, some (but not all) news articles reported that Alpha Jamison was head coach that season, with Balliet assisting. The Purdue Debris yearbook listed both Jamison and Balliet simply as "coaches".

== Schedule ==
Date	Opponent	Site	Result	Source
September 28	Franklin (IN)*	Stuart Field; West Lafayette, IN	W 24–0	
October 5	at Wabash*	Stuart Field; Crawfordsville, IN	W 45–0	
October 12	at Chicago	Marshall Field; Chicago, IL (rivalry)	T 5–5	
October 19	DePauw*	Stuart Field; West Lafayette, IN	W 19–0	
October 26	at Indiana	Jordan Field; Bloomington, IN (rivalry)	L 6–11	
November 2	Case*	Stuart Field; West Lafayette, IN	W 23–0	
November 9	at Notre Dame*	Cartier Field; Notre Dame, IN (rivalry)	L 6–12	
November 16	Illinois	Stuart Field; West Lafayette, IN (rivalry)	L 6–28	
November 28	Northwestern	Stuart Field; West Lafayette, IN	L 5–10	
*Non-conference game

== Roster ==
- A. H. Barnes, E
- F. V. Berkey, FB
- William Berkshire, C
- J. W. Cornell, HB
- J. M. Davidson, C
- G. A. Davis, T
- G. A. Galbreath, HB
- Ora Herkles, E
- F. C. Hohn, E
- Will Johnson, T
- Harry G. Leslie, FB
- G. C. McCann, QB
- John Miller, G
- Edward Mills, HB
- F. Riebel, G
- W. E. Russell, HB
- Alex Smith, T
