= 1900 Northwestern Purple football team =

American college football season

1900 Northwestern Purple football
- Conference: Western Conference
- Record: 7–2–3 (2–1–2 Western)
- Head coach: Charles M. Hollister
- Captain: Cyrus E. Dietz
- Home stadium: Sheppard Field

1900 Western Conference football standings
	Conf.					Overall
Team	W		L		T	W		L		T
Minnesota +	3	–	0	–	1	10	–	0	–	2
Iowa +	2	–	0	–	1	7	–	0	–	1
Wisconsin	2	–	1	–	0	8	–	1	–	0
Michigan	3	–	2	–	0	7	–	2	–	1
Northwestern	2	–	1	–	2	7	–	2	–	3
Chicago	2	–	3	–	1	9	–	5	–	1
Indiana	1	–	2	–	1	4	–	2	–	2
Illinois	1	–	3	–	2	7	–	3	–	2
Purdue	0	–	4	–	0	4	–	4	–	0
+ – Conference co-champions

The 1900 Northwestern Purple team represented Northwestern University during the 1900 Western Conference football season. In their second year under head coach Charles M. Hollister, the Purple compiled a 7–2–3 record (2–1–2 against Western Conference opponents) and finished in fifth place in the Western Conference.

== Schedule ==
Date	Opponent	Site	Result	Attendance	Source
September 22	Northwestern College	Sheppard Field; Evanston, IL	W 36–0		
September 26	North Division High School	Sheppard Field; Evanston, IL	W 29–0		
September 29	Chicago Physicians and Surgeons	Sheppard Field; Evanston, IL	L 0–6		
October 6	Rush Medical	Sheppard Field; Evanston, IL	W 6–0		
October 13	Indiana	Sheppard Field; Evanston, IL	W 12–0		
October 17	Lake Forest	Sheppard Field; Evanston, IL	W 23–0		
October 20	Illinois	Sheppard Field; Evanston, IL (rivalry)	T 0–0		
October 27	Beloit	Sheppard Field; Evanston, IL	T 6–6		
November 3	Knox	Sheppard Field; Evanston, IL	W 11–5		
November 10	at Chicago	Marshall Field; Chicago, IL	W 5–0		
November 17	at Minnesota	Northrop Field; Minneapolis, MN	L 0–21	2,500	
November 29	vs. Iowa	Rock Island, IL	T 5–5		
