= 1906 Fordham football team =

American college football season

1906 Fordham football
- Conference: Independent
- Record: 15–5 / 5–3
- Head coach: Fred L. Smith (3rd season)
- Captain: Howard Gargan
- Home stadium: Fordham Field, Polo Grounds

1906 Eastern college football independents records
	Conf.			Overall
Team	W	L	T	W		L		T
Princeton		–		9	–	0	–	1
Yale		–		9	–	0	–	1
Haverford		–		7	–	0	–	2
Harvard		–		10	–	1	–	0
Cornell		–		8	–	1	–	2
Lafayette		–		8	–	1	–	1
Penn State		–		8	–	1	–	1
Washington & Jefferson		–		9	–	2	–	0
Swarthmore		–		7	–	2	–	0
Drexel		–		6	–	2	–	0
Tufts		–		6	–	2	–	0
Penn		–		7	–	2	–	3
Carlisle		–		9	–	3	–	0
Brown		–		6	–	3	–	0
Rutgers		–		5	–	2	–	2
Dartmouth		–		6	–	3	–	1
Syracuse		–		6	–	3	–	0
Colgate		–		4	–	2	–	2
Vermont		–		5	–	4	–	0
Fordham		–		5	–	3	–	0
Western U. of Penn.		–		6	–	4	–	0
Holy Cross		–		4	–	3	–	1
Amherst		–		3	–	3	–	1
Lehigh		–		5	–	5	–	1
Bucknell		–		3	–	4	–	1
Dickinson		–		3	–	4	–	2
Carnegie Tech		–		2	–	3	–	2
Army		–		3	–	5	–	1
Franklin & Marshall		–		3	–	5	–	1
Wesleyan		–		2	–	4	–	1
New Hampshire		–		2	–	5	–	1
Villanova		–		3	–	7	–	0
Springfield Training School		–		1	–	5	–	3
NYU		–		0	–	4	–	0

The 1906 Fordham football team was an American football team that represented Fordham University as an independent during the 1906 college football season. Fordham claims a 15–5 record, though College Football Data Warehouse (CFDW) lists the team's record as 5–3.

Fred L. Smith was the team's coach for a third, non-consecutive year. Quarterback Howard Gargan was the team captain from 1905 to 1907 and took over as head coach in 1908. The team played its home games at Fordham Field in The Bronx and at the Polo Grounds in Manhattan.

== Schedule ==
The following eight games are reported in Fordham's media guide, CFDW, and contemporaneous press coverage.

Date	Opponent	Site	Result	Attendance	Source
September 29	at Rutgers	Neilson Field; New Brunswick, NJ	L 0–6		
October 6	RPI	Fordham Field; Bronx, NY	W 14–0		
October 20	Medico-Chirurgical	Fordham Field; Bronx, NY	W 29–0		
October 27	University of Maryland, Baltimore	Fordham Field; Bronx, NY	W 51–0		
November 3	at Holy Cross	Fitton Field; Worcester, MA	L 5–8		
November 10	Delaware	Fordham Field; Bronx, NY	W 16–4		
November 17	Villanova	Fordham Field; Bronx, NY	W 18–5		
November 29	Holy Cross	Polo Grounds; New York, NY	L 6–15	6,000	

The following are 12 additional games reported in the Fordham media guide.

Date	Opponent	Site	Result
	Local athletic club		W
	Murray Hill Athletic Club		W 10–6
	Betts Academy		W 20–0
	Bedford Athletic Club		L 0–17
	Nutley Athletic Club		W 10–0
	Audubon Field Society		W 6–0
	NYU		W 12–0
	St. John's College		W 37–5
	Bedford		L 6–18
	Beford		W 18–0
	Pratt		W 19–11
	Fordham Prep		W 16–12
