= 1901 Indiana Hoosiers football team =

American college football season

1901 Indiana Hoosiers football
- Conference: Western Conference
- Record: 6–3 (1–2 Western)
- Head coach: James H. Horne (4th season)
- Captain: Harry Davidson
- Home stadium: Jordan Field

1901 Western Conference football standings
	Conf.					Overall
Team	W		L		T	W		L		T
Michigan +	4	–	0	–	0	11	–	0	–	0
Wisconsin +	2	–	0	–	0	9	–	0	–	0
Minnesota	3	–	1	–	0	9	–	1	–	1
Illinois	4	–	2	–	0	8	–	2	–	0
Northwestern	3	–	2	–	0	8	–	2	–	1
Indiana	1	–	2	–	0	6	–	3	–	0
Purdue	0	–	3	–	1	4	–	4	–	1
Chicago	0	–	4	–	1	8	–	6	–	2
Iowa	0	–	3	–	0	6	–	3	–	0
+ – Conference co-champions

The 1901 Indiana Hoosiers football team was an American football team that represented Indiana University during the 1901 Western Conference football season. In its fourth season under head coach James H. Horne, the team compiled a 6–3 record and outscored opponents by a total of 214 to 87.

== Schedule ==
Date	Opponent	Site	Result	Attendance	Source
September 28	Wabash*	Jordan Field; Bloomington, IN	W 24–6		
October 5	Rose Polytechnic*	Jordan Field; Bloomington, IN	W 56–0		
October 12	at Michigan	Regents Field; Ann Arbor, MI	L 0–33	2,000	
October 19	Franklin (IN)*	Jordan Field; Bloomington, IN	W 78–0		
October 26	Purdue*	Jordan Field; Bloomington, IN (rivalry)	W 11–6		
November 2	vs. Illinois	Newby Oval; Indianapolis, IN (rivalry)	L 0–18		
November 16	at Notre Dame	Cartier Field; Notre Dame, IN	L 5–18		
November 23	at Ohio State	Ohio Field; Columbus, OH	W 18–6		
November 28	DePauw*	Jordan Field; Bloomington, IN	W 24–0		
*Non-conference game

== Personnel ==
=== Roster ===
Name	Position	Year
R. Smith	End	
Highly	Left Guard	
E. Smith	End	
Alvah J. Rucker	Back	
Phelps F. Darby	Full Back	
Walter Railsback	Right Guard	
Markle	Center	
Harry R. Davidson	Right Tackle	Senior
E. B. Elfers	Left Tackle	
Knight		
John A. Foster	Quarterback	Senior
Zora G. Clevenger	Left Half	Sophomore
Willis N. Coval	Right Halfback	
Lockridge	Right Halfback	
Gordon		

=== Staffing ===
- James H. Horne, head coach
- Shaw, manager
