= 1900 Wisconsin Badgers football team =

American college football season

1900 Wisconsin Badgers football
- Conference: Western Conference
- Record: 8–1 (2–1 Western)
- Head coach: Philip King (5th season)
- Captain: Al Chamberlain
- Home stadium: Randall Field

1900 Western Conference football standings
| | Conf. | | | | | Overall |
| Team | W | | L | | T | W | | L | | T |
|---|---|---|---|---|---|---|---|---|---|---|
| Minnesota + | 3 | – | 0 | – | 1 | 10 | – | 0 | – | 2 |
| Iowa + | 2 | – | 0 | – | 1 | 7 | – | 0 | – | 1 |
| Wisconsin | 2 | – | 1 | – | 0 | 8 | – | 1 | – | 0 |
| Michigan | 3 | – | 2 | – | 0 | 7 | – | 2 | – | 1 |
| Northwestern | 2 | – | 1 | – | 2 | 7 | – | 2 | – | 3 |
| Chicago | 2 | – | 3 | – | 1 | 9 | – | 5 | – | 1 |
| Indiana | 1 | – | 2 | – | 1 | 4 | – | 2 | – | 2 |
| Illinois | 1 | – | 3 | – | 2 | 7 | – | 3 | – | 2 |
| Purdue | 0 | – | 4 | – | 0 | 4 | – | 4 | – | 0 |
+ – Conference co-champions

The 1900 Wisconsin Badgers football team represented the University of Wisconsin in the 1900 Western Conference football season. Led by fifth-year head coach Philip King, the Badgers compiled an overall record of 8–1 with a mark of 2–1 in conference play, placing third in the Western Conference. The team's captain was Al Chamberlain.

== Schedule ==
| Date | Opponent | Site | Result | Attendance | Source |
|---|---|---|---|---|---|
| September 29 | Ripon* | Randall Field; Madison, WI | W 50–0 | | |
| October 6 | Chicago Physicians and Surgeons* | Randall Field; Madison, WI | W 36–0 | | |
| October 13 | vs. Beloit* | Athletic Park; Milwaukee, WI | W 11–0 | 5,000 | |
| October 20 | Upper Iowa* | Randall Field; Madison, WI | W 64–0 | | |
| October 27 | Grinnell* | Randall Field; Madison, WI | W 17–0 | | |
| November 3 | at Minnesota | Northrop Field; Minneapolis, MN (rivalry) | L 5–6 | | |
| November 10 | Notre Dame* | Randall Field; Madison, WI | W 54–0 | | |
| November 17 | at Chicago | Marshall Field; Chicago, IL | W 39–5 | | |
| November 24 | Illinois | Randall Field; Madison, WI | W 27–0 | | |
*Non-conference game
