= 1900 Illinois Fighting Illini football team =

American college football season

1900 Illinois Fighting Illini football
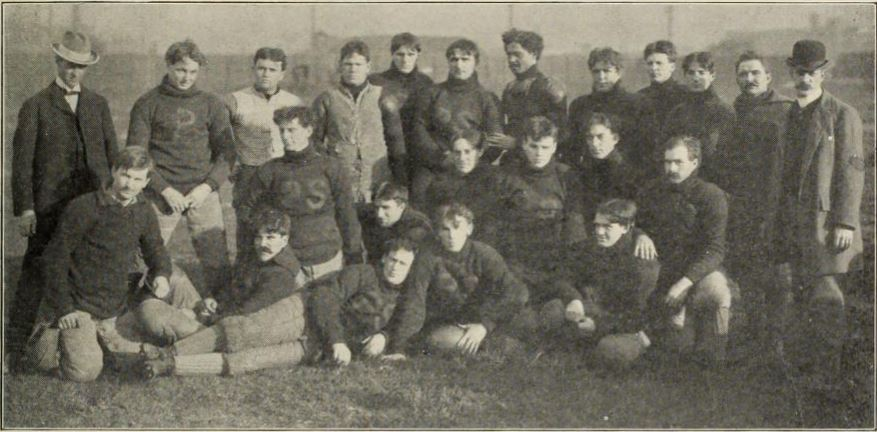
- Conference: Western Conference
- Record: 7–3–2 (1–3–2 Western)
- Head coach: Fred Smith (1st season)
- Captain: Arthur R. Hall
- Home stadium: Illinois Field

1900 Western Conference football standings
	Conf.					Overall
Team	W		L		T	W		L		T
Minnesota +	3	–	0	–	1	10	–	0	–	2
Iowa +	2	–	0	–	1	7	–	0	–	1
Wisconsin	2	–	1	–	0	8	–	1	–	0
Michigan	3	–	2	–	0	7	–	2	–	1
Northwestern	2	–	1	–	2	7	–	2	–	3
Chicago	2	–	3	–	1	9	–	5	–	1
Indiana	1	–	2	–	1	4	–	2	–	2
Illinois	1	–	3	–	2	7	–	3	–	2
Purdue	0	–	4	–	0	4	–	4	–	0
+ – Conference co-champions

The 1900 Illinois Fighting Illini football team was an American football team that represented the University of Illinois during the 1900 Western Conference football season. In their first season under head coach Fred Smith, the Illini compiled a 7–3–2 record and finished in eighth place in the Western Conference. End/halfback Arthur R. Hall was the team captain.

== Schedule ==
Date	Time	Opponent	Site	Result	Attendance	Source
September 29		Rose Polytechnic*	Illinois Field; Champaign, IL	W 26–0		
October 3		DePauw*	Illinois Field; Champaign, IL	W 63–0		
October 6		Illinois Wesleyan*	Illinois Field; Champaign, IL	W 21–0		
October 10		Chicago Physicians and Surgeons*	Illinois Field; Champaign, IL	W 6–0		
October 13		Knox*	Illinois Field; Champaign, IL	W 16–0		
October 16		Lombard*	Illinois Field; Champaign, IL	W 35–0		
October 20		at Northwestern	Sheppard Field; Evanston, IL (rivalry)	T 0–0		
October 27		vs. Michigan	Marshall Field; Chicago, IL (rivalry)	L 0–12	8,000–10,000	
November 3		Purdue	Illinois Field; Champaign, IL (rivalry)	W 17–5		
November 10		at Minnesota	Northrop Field; Minneapolis, MN	L 0–23		
November 17	2:45 p.m.	vs. Indiana	Newby Oval; Indianapolis, IN (rivalry)	T 0–0	3,000	
November 24		at Wisconsin	Randall Field; Madison, WI	L 0–27		
*Non-conference game

== Roster ==
1900 Illinois Fighting Illini football team roster
Players
Coaches
Offense

Pos.	#	Name	Class
TE		Bertram W. Adsit
FB		Claude P. Briggs
OT, G		C.M. Cayou
HB, TE		James F. Cook
TE		Walter G. Diener
HB, TE		Arthur R. Hall (C)
G		Martin E. Hanson
OT		Justa M. Lindgren
OT, C		Arthur Lowenthal
FB		Carl L. Lundgren
HB		Robert W. Martin
QB		C.M. Mathews
QB		Fred L. Muhl
HB, TE		E.R. Pollard
TE, G		Claude J. Rothgeb
C		Walter F. Smock
G		Garland Stahl
C		Joseph W. Wilson

Defense

Pos.	#	Name	Class

Special teams

Pos.	#	Name	Class
QB		A.C. Ahlswede
G		Lawrence T. Allen
C		F.J. Arnold
HB, TE		O.C. Bell
HB		Lewis Brown
HB		C.C. Chamberlain
OT, G		Clark M. Clayton
C, G		W. Coons
G, TE		William O. Doud
G		Lawrence S.D. Fairchild
OT		M.M. Fishback
OT		J.C. Gilmour
HB, FB		Lee Jutton
TE		T.H. Landon
OT		William A. McKnight
TE		E.A. McMillan
HB, TE		E.E. Reniff
OT		A.L. Waldorf
HB, FB		J.D. White

Head coach

Fred Smith

Coordinators/assistant coaches

Legend

- (C) Team captain
- (S) Suspended
- (I) Ineligible
- Injured
- Redshirt

Roster
Last update: November 16, 2016
