= Cyrus E. Dietz =

American judge

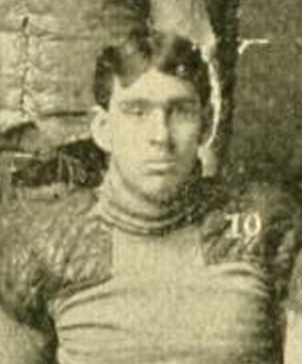
- Dietz pictured as captain of the 1901 Northwestern team

Biographical details
- Born: March 17, 1875 near Onarga, Illinois, U.S.
- Died: September 13, 1929 (aged 54); Moline, Illinois, U.S.

Playing career
- 1898–1901: Northwestern
- 1902: Kansas State
- Position: Guard

Coaching career (HC unless noted)
- 1902: Kansas State
- 1903: Willamette
- 1904: Moline HS (IL)

Head coaching record
- Overall: 5–8–2 (college)

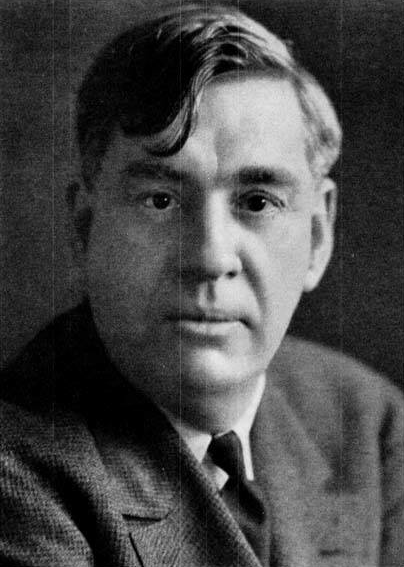
Dietz's official photograph, c. 1929.

Cyrus Edgar Dietz (March 17, 1875 – September 13, 1929) was an American jurist and college football player and coach.

Dietz was born on March 17, 1875, on a farm near graduated Onarga, Illinois. He graduated in 1897 from the Grand Prairie Seminary in Onarga. Dietz then attended Northwestern University, which was affiliated with the seminary. At Northwestern, Dietz played as a guard for four seasons for the Northwestern football team, serving as captain for the 1900 and 1901 seasons. Also starting on the team during three of these years was Dietz's brother, G. O. Dietz. Dietz graduated from Northwestern in 1902 with a law degree, and was a member of the Delta Chi fraternity along with his brother.

Dietz became the seventh head football coach at Kansas State Agricultural College—now known as Kansas State University—in 1902, holding that position for one season. Dietz also played with the team in its first game of the year in 1902. His record at Kansas State was 2–6. Dietz's brother coached the team the following year. In 1903, Dietz was the head football coach at Willamette University in Salem, Oregon.

Dietz and his brother subsequently went into the practice of law together, opening a law firm in Moline, Illinois, with Burton Peek. In 1928, Dietz was selected special counsel to represent the State of Illinois in the Wisconsin v. Illinois case in the U.S. Supreme Court.

Dietz was elected to the Illinois Supreme Court on November 6, 1928. He died in office the following year in Moline, after suffering injuries in a fall from a horse. His brother, Godlove O. Dietz died in March of the same year.

== Head coaching record ==
=== College ===
| Year | Team | Overall | Conference | Standing | Bowl/playoffs |
|---|---|---|---|---|---|
Kansas State Aggies (Independent) (1902)
| 1902 | Kansas State | 2–6 | | | |
| Kansas State: | | 2–6 | | | |
Willamette (Independent) (1903)
| 1903 | Willamette | 3–2–2 | | | |
| Willamette: | | 3–2–2 | | | |
| Total: | | 5–8–2 | | | |
