= 1901 Wisconsin Badgers football team =

American college football season

1901 Wisconsin Badgers football

Western Conference co-champion
- Conference: Western Conference
- Record: 9–0 (2–0 Western)
- Head coach: Philip King (6th season)
- Captain: Arthur Hale Curtis
- Home stadium: Randall Field

1901 Western Conference football standings
	Conf.					Overall
Team	W		L		T	W		L		T
Michigan +	4	–	0	–	0	11	–	0	–	0
Wisconsin +	2	–	0	–	0	9	–	0	–	0
Minnesota	3	–	1	–	0	9	–	1	–	1
Illinois	4	–	2	–	0	8	–	2	–	0
Northwestern	3	–	2	–	0	8	–	2	–	1
Indiana	1	–	2	–	0	6	–	3	–	0
Purdue	0	–	3	–	1	4	–	4	–	1
Chicago	0	–	4	–	1	8	–	6	–	2
Iowa	0	–	3	–	0	6	–	3	–	0
+ – Conference co-champions

The 1901 Wisconsin Badgers football team was an American football team that represented the University of Wisconsin in the 1901 Western Conference football season. In its sixth season under head coach Philip King, the team compiled a 9–0 record (2–0 against conference opponents), tied for the Western Conference championship, and outscored opponents by a total of 317 to 5. Arthur Hale Curtis was the team captain.

Caspar Whitney of Outing magazine named two Wisconsin players, tackle Curtis and halfback Al "Norsky" Larson, as second-team players on his 1901 College Football All-America Team. Eddie Cochems and William Juneau also played on the team.

== Schedule ==
Date	Opponent	Site	Result	Attendance	Source
September 28	Milwaukee Medical*	Randall Field; Madison, WI	W 26–0		
October 5	Hyde Park High School*	Randall Field; Madison, WI	W 62–0		
October 12	vs. Beloit*	Milwaukee Baseball Park; Milwaukee, WI	W 40–0		
October 19	Knox (IL)*	Randall Field; Madison, WI	W 23–5		
October 26	Kansas*	Randall Field; Madison, WI	W 50–0		
November 2	vs. Nebraska*	Milwaukee Baseball Park; Milwaukee, WI (rivalry)	W 18–0		
November 9	Iowa State*	Randall Field; Madison, WI	W 45–0		
November 16	Minnesota	Randall Field; Madison, WI (rivalry)	W 18–0	14,000	
November 28	at Chicago	Marshall Field; Chicago, IL	W 35–0	9,000	
*Non-conference game
