= Clyde Williams (American football) =

American football player and sports coach

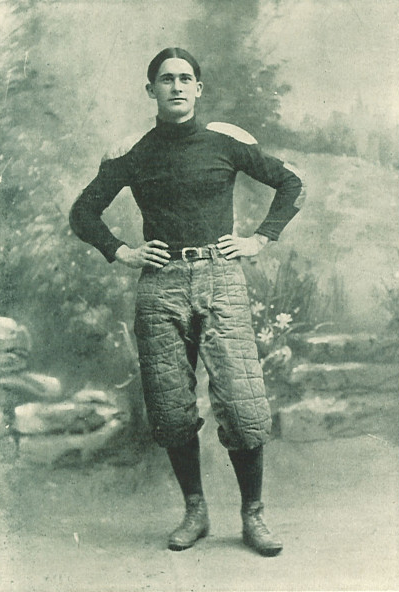
- Williams from 1903 Hawkeye

Biographical details
- Born: March 24, 1879; Shelby, Iowa, U.S.
- Died: March 20, 1938 (aged 58); Sheldon, Iowa, U.S.

Playing career

Football
- 1898–1901: Iowa

Baseball
- 1899–1902: Iowa
- 1902–1903: Sioux Falls Canaries
- 1904–1905: Marshalltown Grays
- 1906: Marshalltown Brownies
- 1907: St. Paul Saints
- 1907–1908: Toledo Mud Hens
- 1908–1910: Des Moines Boosters
- Positions: Quarterback (football); Second baseman, shortstop, third baseman (baseball)

Coaching career (HC unless noted)

Football
- 1906: Iowa State (assistant)
- 1907–1912: Iowa State

Basketball
- 1907–1911: Iowa State

Baseball
- 1906–1909: Iowa State
- 1916–1918: Iowa State

Administrative career (AD unless noted)
- 1914–1919: Iowa State

Head coaching record
- Overall: 32–15–2 (football); 20–29 (basketball); 60–35–5 (baseball)

Accomplishments and honors

Championships
- Football; 2 MVIAA (1911–1912)

Awards
- Third-team All-American (1900)

Samuel Clyde Williams (March 24, 1879 – March 20, 1938) was an All-American football player at the University of Iowa, and a football, basketball, and baseball coach and athletic director at Iowa State University. He is a member of both schools' Halls of Fame.

== College career ==
Williams was born in Shelby, Iowa. He played college football for the University of Iowa under coach Alden Knipe. Knipe was a stern disciplinarian, and friction soon arose between Knipe and the older players of the 1898 Hawkeye football team. After Iowa started the season 1–4–1, Ralph Blackmore led the "Blackmore Revolt", in which five upperclassmen quit the team. Knipe simply started younger players, including Clyde Williams, who was a freshman at the time. With Williams at quarterback, Iowa finished the year 2–0–1, ending the season with a 6–5 victory over rival Nebraska. Nebraska had been heavy favorites and were coached by Fielding H. Yost.

In Williams' sophomore season in 1899, Iowa faced heavily favored Chicago, coached by Amos Alonzo Stagg. The Hawks scored a touchdown against Chicago, while the Maroons could muster only a field goal. Since both were scored as five points in those days, Iowa settled for a 5–5 tie. Chicago went on to win the 1899 Western Conference title with a 12–0–2 record.

Under Williams, the Hawkeyes did not yield another point all year, winning their last seven games by a combined score of 194–0. Iowa closed the 1899 season by defeating Illinois in their first ever meeting by a 58–0 score. That capped off an 8–0–1 season for the Hawkeyes, their first ever undefeated season. Less than 24 hours after the season ended, the University of Iowa accepted an invitation for membership in the Western Conference. Caspar Whitney in Collier's Magazine named Clyde Williams as the top quarterback in the West in 1899.

In Williams' junior season in 1900, the Hawkeyes won their first four non-conference games by a combined score of 198–0. Chicago loomed as Iowa's first ever Big Ten opponent. Chicago had won the Western Conference the previous year and handed Iowa its only blemish on the season in 1899. After a scoreless first half, the Hawks scored two quick touchdowns early in the second period and Iowa won, 17–0. Iowa's next game was against Michigan, in Detroit. The Hawkeyes led 28–0 before Michigan managed a field goal to prevent the shutout, the first points scored on Iowa in 1900. But the Hawkeyes dominated the Wolverines and won, 28–5.

The victories over Chicago and Michigan allowed Iowa to earn a share of the Big Ten title with Minnesota in Iowa's first year in the conference. The Hawkeyes finished with a 7–0–1 record, their second straight undefeated season. After the season, Clyde Williams was named a third-team All-American by Walter Camp. Williams was the first player west of the Mississippi River to garner All-American honors. As a result, Clyde Williams is often referred to as "Iowa's first All-American".

Only three starters returned in Williams' senior season in 1901. Williams was named as Iowa's team captain. The Hawkeyes won their first three games of 1901 before preparing to play fellow defending Western Conference champion, Minnesota. 25 minutes before the game, Williams was told he was ineligible to play for the remainder of the season, because he had played summer baseball under an assumed name. A deflated Hawkeye team lost to Minnesota, 16–0, losing their first game and yielding their first touchdown in 23 games. Iowa finished with a 6–3 record in 1901.

In four years as a starting quarterback at Iowa, Williams never lost a game. The Hawkeyes' record in games Williams started, from the middle of the 1898 season to the middle of the 1901 season, was 23–0–3. He earned 11 letters at Iowa, four in football, four in baseball, and three in track.

== Coaching career ==
After serving as an Iowa assistant football coach for two years, Williams went to Ames, Iowa as an assistant football coach for Iowa State University. Williams served as the Cyclones' head football coach for six seasons from 1907 to 1912. During that time, he had a coaching record of 32–15–2. This ranks him sixth at Iowa State in total wins and fourth at Iowa State in winning percentage. In addition, he led Iowa State to two Missouri Valley Intercollegiate Athletic Association football titles in 1911 and 1912, which are currently the only two conference football championships in school history.

Williams was the school's first men's basketball coach from 1908 to 1911, where he compiled a 20–29 record. He also served as Iowa State's baseball coach and was their athletic director from 1914 to 1919.

== Death ==
Williams died on March 20, 1938, at his home, in Sheldon, Iowa, following several months of illness.

== Honors ==
Iowa State's home football stadium from 1915 through 1975 was named Clyde Williams Field in Williams's honor. It was replaced when Iowa State moved to their current facility, Jack Trice Stadium.

Williams was inducted into the State of Iowa Hall of Fame in 1956. He is also one of the few people inducted into both the University of Iowa Athletics Hall of Fame (inducted 1993) and the Iowa State Athletics Hall of Fame (inducted 1997).

== Head coaching record ==
=== Football ===
Year	Team	Overall	Conference	Standing	Bowl/playoffs
Iowa State Cyclones (Independent) (1907)
1907	Iowa State	6–2			
Iowa State Cyclones (Missouri Valley Intercollegiate Athletic Association) (1908–1912)
1908	Iowa State	6–3	2–1	T–2nd	
1909	Iowa State	4–3–1	0–2–1	T–5th	
1910	Iowa State	4–4	2–2	T–4th	
1911	Iowa State	6–1–1	2–0–1	T–1st	
1912	Iowa State	6–2	2–0	T–1st	
Iowa State:		32–15–2	8–5–2		
Total:		32–15–2			
National championship Conference title Conference division title or championship game berth

=== Basketball ===
Record table
Season	Team	Overall	Conference	Standing	Postseason
Iowa State Cyclones (Missouri Valley Intercollegiate Athletic Association) (1907–1911)
1907–08	Iowa State	1–1	1–0	2nd (North)	
1908–09	Iowa State	4–10	4–4	2nd (North)	
1909–10	Iowa State	9–7	6–2	T–1st (North)	
1910–11	Iowa State	6–11	6–8	3rd	
Iowa State:		20–29	17–14		
Total:		20–29			
National champion Postseason invitational champion Conference regular season champion Conference regular season and conference tournament champion Division regular season champion Division regular season and conference tournament champion Conference tournament champion

=== Baseball ===
Record table
Season	Team	Overall	Conference	Standing	Postseason
Iowa State Cyclones (Independent) (1906–1907)
1906	Iowa State	3–3–1			
1907	Iowa State	15–2–1			
Iowa State Cyclones (Missouri Valley Intercollegiate Athletic Association) (1908–1909)
1908	Iowa State	11–1–1			
1909	Iowa State	10–6–2			
Iowa State Cyclones (Missouri Valley Intercollegiate Athletic Association) (1916–1918)
1916	Iowa State	7–9			
1917	Iowa State	5–7			
1918	Iowa State	9–7			
Total:		60–35–5			
National champion Postseason invitational champion Conference regular season champion Conference regular season and conference tournament champion Division regular season champion Division regular season and conference tournament champion Conference tournament champion
