= 1900 Chicago Maroons football team =

American college football season

1900 Chicago Maroons football
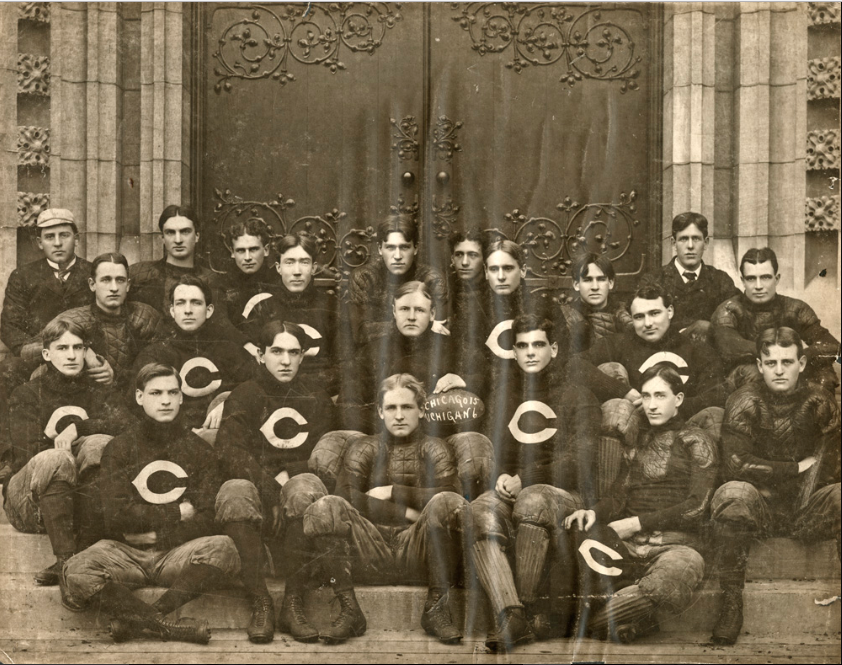
- Conference: Western Conference
- Record: 9–5–1 (2–3–1 Western)
- Head coach: Amos Alonzo Stagg (9th season)
- Captain: Kellogg Speed
- Home stadium: Marshall Field

1900 Western Conference football standings
	Conf.					Overall
Team	W		L		T	W		L		T
Minnesota +	3	–	0	–	1	10	–	0	–	2
Iowa +	2	–	0	–	1	7	–	0	–	1
Wisconsin	2	–	1	–	0	8	–	1	–	0
Michigan	3	–	2	–	0	7	–	2	–	1
Northwestern	2	–	1	–	2	7	–	2	–	3
Chicago	2	–	3	–	1	9	–	5	–	1
Indiana	1	–	2	–	1	4	–	2	–	2
Illinois	1	–	3	–	2	7	–	3	–	2
Purdue	0	–	4	–	0	4	–	4	–	0
+ – Conference co-champions

The 1900 Chicago Maroons football team was an American football team that represented the University of Chicago during the 1900 Western Conference football season. In their ninth season under head coach Amos Alonzo Stagg, the Maroons compiled a 9–5–1 record, finished in sixth place in the Western Conference with a 2–3–1 record against conference opponents, and outscored all opponents by a combined total of 204 to 135.

== Schedule ==
Date	Opponent	Site	Result	Attendance	Source
September 15	Englewood HS*	Marshall Field; Chicago, IL	W 18–0		
September 15	Hyde Park HS*	Marshall Field; Chicago, IL	W 5–0		
September 22	Lombard*	Marshall Field; Chicago, IL	W 24–0		
September 26	Monmouth*	Marshall Field; Chicago, IL	W 29–0		
September 29	Knox (IL)*	Marshall Field; Chicago, IL	W 16–0		
October 3	Dixon College*	Marshall Field; Chicago, IL	W 23–5		
October 6	Purdue	Marshall Field; Chicago, IL (rivalry)	W 17–5		
October 9	Rush Medical*	Marshall Field; Chicago, IL	W 40–0		
October 13	at Minnesota	Northrop Field; Minneapolis, MN	T 6–6		
October 20	Brown*	Marshall Field; Chicago, IL	L 6–11		
October 27	at Penn*	Franklin Field; Philadelphia, PA	L 0–41	13,000	
November 3	Iowa	Marshall Field; Chicago, IL	L 0–17		
November 10	Northwestern	Marshall Field; Chicago, IL	L 0–5		
November 17	Wisconsin	Marshall Field; Chicago, IL	L 5–39		
November 29	Michigan	Marshall Field; Chicago, IL (rivalry)	W 15–6	10,000	
*Non-conference game

== Roster ==
Player	Position
Kellogg Speed (captain)	center
Orville Elbridge Atwood	left tackle
Horace Greeley Bodwell	right guard
William Carey	right guard
William Franklin Eldridge	right end
Charles William Erwin	right guard
Frederick Feil	left tackle
Charles Gibbons Flanagan	left guard
George Henry Garrey	quarterback
James Ronald Henry	left halfback
Frank O. Horton	right halfback
Harvey H. Lord	left halfback
James Garfield MacNab	right tackle
Ernest Earl Perkins	fullback
Zelmer O. Pettit	right end
Alfred William Place	right halfback
Edward Prickett Rich	left end
James Milton Sheldon	quarterback
Alvin Bricker Snider	fullback
Alfred H. Fowler	substitute
J. W. Hoag	substitute
Gerhard H. Jensen	substitute
Ernest de Koven Leffingwell	substitute
W. E. Post	substitute
Benjamin Strauss	substitute
Hiram Boardman Conibear	trainer

- Head coach: Amos Alonzo Stagg (9th year at Chicago)
