= 1900 Purdue Boilermakers football team =

American college football season

1900 Purdue Boilermakers football
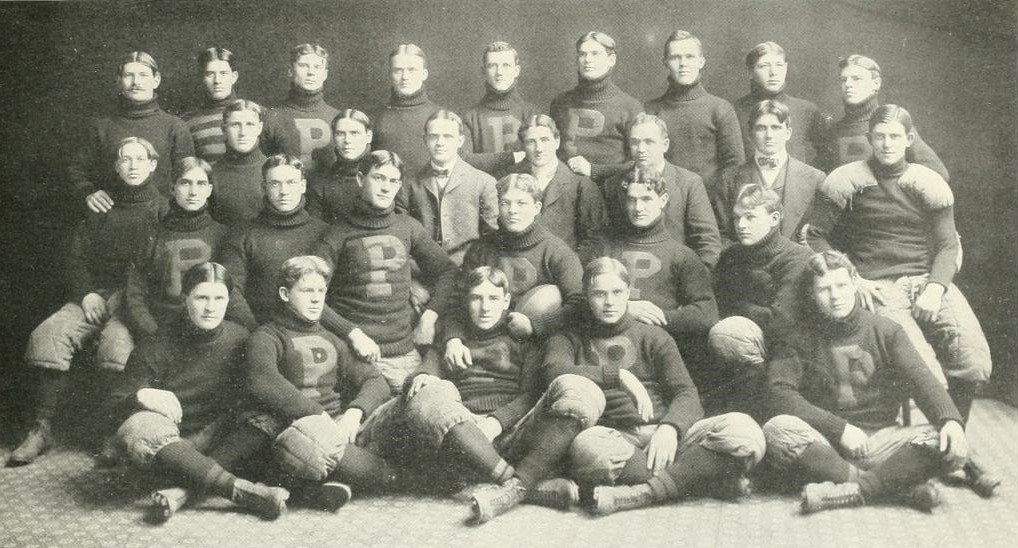
- Conference: Western Conference
- Record: 4–4 (0–4 Western)
- Head coach: Alpha Jamison (3rd season)
- Captain: Edward C. Robertson
- Home stadium: Stuart Field

1900 Western Conference football standings
	Conf.					Overall
Team	W		L		T	W		L		T
Minnesota +	3	–	0	–	1	10	–	0	–	2
Iowa +	2	–	0	–	1	7	–	0	–	1
Wisconsin	2	–	1	–	0	8	–	1	–	0
Michigan	3	–	2	–	0	7	–	2	–	1
Northwestern	2	–	1	–	2	7	–	2	–	3
Chicago	2	–	3	–	1	9	–	5	–	1
Indiana	1	–	2	–	1	4	–	2	–	2
Illinois	1	–	3	–	2	7	–	3	–	2
Purdue	0	–	4	–	0	4	–	4	–	0
+ – Conference co-champions

The 1900 Purdue Boilermakers football team was an American football team that represented Purdue University during the 1900 Western Conference football season. The Boilermakers compiled a 4–4 record and outscored their opponents by a total of 172 to 79 in their third season under head coach Alpha Jamison. Edward C. Robertson was the team captain.

== Schedule ==
Date	Opponent	Site	Result	Attendance	Source
September 29	Illinois Wesleyan*	Stuart Field; West Lafayette, IN	W 39–0	1,500	
October 6	at Chicago	Marshall Field; Chicago, IL (rivalry)	L 5–17		
October 13	DePauw*	Stuart Field; West Lafayette, IN	W 28–5		
October 20	at Michigan	Regents Field; Ann Arbor, Michigan	L 6–11	2,500	
October 27	Rose Polytechnic*	Stuart Field; West Lafayette, IN	W 46–5	1,000	
November 3	at Illinois	Illinois Field; Champaign, IL (rivalry)	L 5–17		
November 17	Earlham*	Stuart Field; West Lafayette, IN	W 38–0		
November 29	Indiana	Stuart Field; West Lafayette, IN (rivalry)	L 5–24		
*Non-conference game

== Roster ==
- Hollis Arnold, T
- A. H. Barnes, E
- F. V. Berkey, FB
- William Berkshire, C
- J. M. Davidson, C
- G. A. Davis, T
- G. A. Galbreath, HB
- Rodney Hitt, E
- F. C. Hohn, E
- Will Johnson, T
- John Jones, QB
- Harry G. Leslie, FB
- G. C. McCann, QB
- F. J. McCoy, HB
- John Miller, G
- J. D. Minch, E
- Charlie Quinn
- Edward C. Robertson, QB-HB
- Alex Smith, T
- F. L. Waterman, QB
