= 1901 Northwestern Purple football team =

American college football season

1901 Northwestern Purple football
- Conference: Western Conference
- Record: 8–2–1 (3–2 Western)
- Head coach: Charles M. Hollister (3rd season)
- Captain: Cyrus E. Dietz
- Home stadium: Sheppard Field

1901 Western Conference football standings
	Conf.					Overall
Team	W		L		T	W		L		T
Michigan +	4	–	0	–	0	11	–	0	–	0
Wisconsin +	2	–	0	–	0	9	–	0	–	0
Minnesota	3	–	1	–	0	9	–	1	–	1
Illinois	4	–	2	–	0	8	–	2	–	0
Northwestern	3	–	2	–	0	8	–	2	–	1
Indiana	1	–	2	–	0	6	–	3	–	0
Purdue	0	–	3	–	1	4	–	4	–	1
Chicago	0	–	4	–	1	8	–	6	–	2
Iowa	0	–	3	–	0	6	–	3	–	0
+ – Conference co-champions

The 1901 Northwestern Purple football team was an American football team that represented Northwestern University during the 1901 Western Conference football season. In its third season under head coach Charles M. Hollister, the team compiled an 8–2–1 record, finished in fifth place in the Western Conference, and outscored opponents by a total of 161 to 77. The team's sole losses were to undefeated Michigan and one-loss Minnesota.

Guard Cyrus E. Dietz was the team captain. His brother, G. O. Dietz, played at the fullback position and was selected as a first-team player on the 1901 All-Western college football teams of the Chicago Daily News and Walter Camp.

== Schedule ==
Date	Opponent	Site	Result	Attendance	Source
September 18	Fort Sheridan	Sheppard Field; Evanston, IL	W 27–0		
September 21	Northwestern College	Sheppard Field; Evanston, IL	W 30–0		
September 28	Lombard	Sheppard Field; Evanston, IL	W 47–0		
October 5	Lake Forest	Sheppard Field; Evanston, IL	W 11–0		
October 12	Notre Dame	Sheppard Field; Evanston, IL (rivalry)	W 2–0		
October 19	at Michigan	Regents Field; Ann Arbor, MI (rivalry)	L 0–29		
October 26	at Illinois	Illinois Field; Champaign, IL (rivalry)	W 17–11		
November 9	at Chicago	Marshall Field; Chicago	W 6–5		
November 16	Beloit	Sheppard Field; Evanston, IL	T 11–11		
November 23	Minnesota	Marshall Field; Chicago, IL	L 0–16	2,000	
November 28	at Purdue	Stuart Field; Lafayette, IN	W 10–5		
