= G. O. Dietz =

American football player, coach, lawyer, and judge (1872–1929)

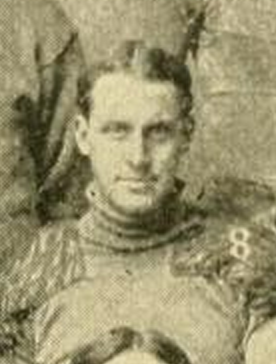
- Dietz pictured on the 1901 Northwestern Team

Biographical details
- Born: August 17, 1872; Iroquois, Illinois, U.S.
- Died: March 23, 1929 (aged 56); Moline, Illinois, U.S.
- Education: University of Michigan

Playing career
- 1897–1898: Northwestern
- 1900–1901: Northwestern
- Position: Back

Coaching career (HC unless noted)
- 1902: Drake
- 1903: Kansas State

Head coaching record
- Overall: 7–7–2

Godlove Orth Dietz (August 17, 1872 – March 23, 1929) was an American college football player, coach, lawyer, and judge. He served as the head football coach at Drake University in 1902 and Kansas State Agricultural College—now known as Kansas State University—in 1903, compiling a career coaching record of 7–7–2.

== Playing career ==
Dietz graduated from the Grand Prairie Seminary in Onarga, Illinois. Dietz then attended Northwestern University, which was affiliated with the seminary. At Northwestern, Dietz played as a back for four seasons for the football team. Also starting on the team during three of these years was Dietz's brother, Cyrus E. Dietz. G. O. Dietz graduated from Northwestern with a law degree, and was a member of the Delta Chi fraternity along with his brother Cyrus.

== Coaching career ==
=== Drake ===
Dietz got his first head coaching job as the sixth head football coach at Drake University located in Des Moines, Iowa for the 1902 season. His record at Drake was 4–3–1. The last game of his season at Drake would provide his career coaching highlight with at 47–0 pounding over Grinnell College on November 26, 1902.

=== Kansas State ===
The next year, Dietz was named the eighth head football coach for the Kansas State Wildcats in Manhattan, Kansas for the 1903 season, succeeding his brother Cyrus in the job. His record at Kansas State was 3–4–1.

== Legal career ==
Dietz and his brother subsequently went into the practice of law together, opening a law firm in Moline, Illinois, with Burton Peek. In the 1920s, Dietz served as a judge on the Moline City Court.

== Head coaching record ==
Year	Team	Overall	Conference	Standing	Bowl/playoffs
Drake Bulldogs (Independent) (1902)
1902	Drake	4–3–1			
Drake:		4–3–1			
Kansas State Aggies (Independent) (1903)
1903	Kansas State	3–4–1			
Kansas State:		3–4–1			
Total:		7–7–1			
