= Fred L. Smith (coach) =

American football and baseball coach

Biographical details
- Education: Princeton University (1897)

Playing career

Football
- 1894–1896: Princeton
- Positions: End, halfback

Coaching career (HC unless noted)

Football
- 1897–1898: Illinois (assistant)
- 1899: Princeton (backfield)
- 1900: Illinois
- 1901: Fordham
- 1904: Fordham
- 1906–1907: Fordham

Baseball
- 1901–1905: Fordham

Head coaching record
- Overall: 24–9–5 (football); 213–66 (baseball)

Frederick Lorenzo Smith was an American college football and college baseball coach. He served as the head football coach at the University of Illinois in 1900 and at Fordham University in 1901, 1904, and from 1906 to 1907, compiling a career college football head coaching record of 24–9–5. Smith was also the head baseball coach at Fordham from 1901 to 1905, tallying a mark of 213–66.

Smith played football at Princeton University as a end from 1894 to 1895 and as a halfback in 1896. He went to Illinois in 1897 as an assistant football coach under George Huff. Smith returned to Princeton in 1899 to coach the backs on the football team.

== Head coaching record ==
=== Football ===
Year	Team	Overall	Conference	Standing	Bowl/playoffs
Illinois Fighting Illini (Western Conference) (1900)
1900	Illinois	7–3–2	1–3–2	8th	
Illinois:		7–3–2	1–3–2		
Fordham (Independent) (1901)
1901	Fordham	2–1–1			
Fordham (Independent) (1904)
1904	Fordham	4–1–1			
Fordham (Independent) (1906–1907)
1906	Fordham	5–3			
1907	Fordham	6–1–1			
Fordham:		17–6–3			
Total:		24–9–5			
