= 1901 Chicago Maroons football team =

American college football season

1901 Chicago Maroons football
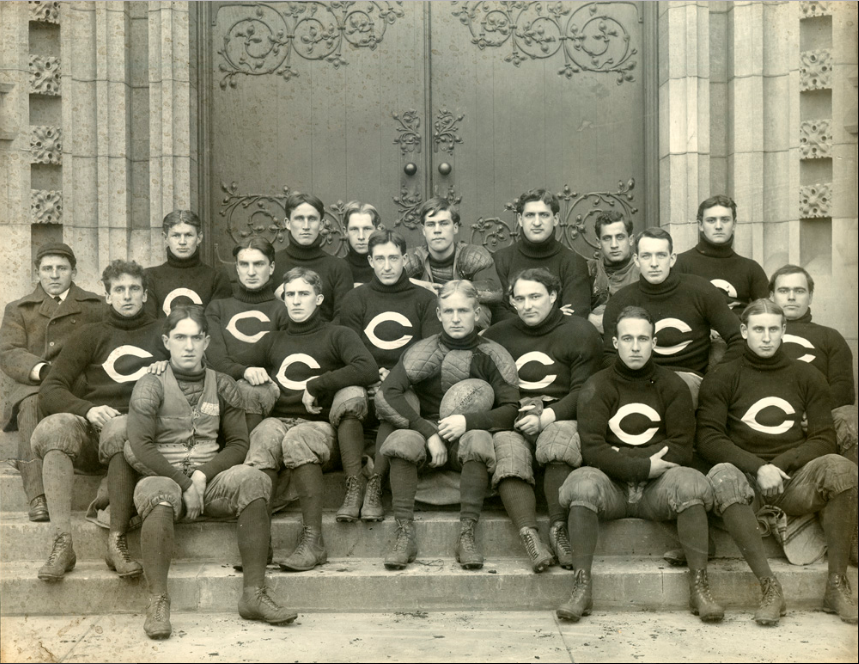
- Conference: Western Conference
- Record: 8–6–2 (0–4–1 Western)
- Head coach: Amos Alonzo Stagg (10th season)
- Captain: James M. Sheldon
- Home stadium: Marshall Field

1901 Western Conference football standings
	Conf.					Overall
Team	W		L		T	W		L		T
Michigan +	4	–	0	–	0	11	–	0	–	0
Wisconsin +	2	–	0	–	0	9	–	0	–	0
Minnesota	3	–	1	–	0	9	–	1	–	1
Illinois	4	–	2	–	0	8	–	2	–	0
Northwestern	3	–	2	–	0	8	–	2	–	1
Indiana	1	–	2	–	0	6	–	3	–	0
Purdue	0	–	3	–	1	4	–	4	–	1
Chicago	0	–	4	–	1	8	–	6	–	2
Iowa	0	–	3	–	0	6	–	3	–	0
+ – Conference co-champions

The 1901 Chicago Maroons football team was an American football team that represented the University of Chicago during the 1901 Western Conference football season. In their 10th season under head coach Amos Alonzo Stagg, the Maroons compiled an 8–6–2 record, finished in eighth place in the Western Conference with a 0–4–1 record against conference opponents, and outscored all opponents by a combined total of 175 to 131.

== Schedule ==
Date	Opponent	Site	Result	Attendance	Source
September 17	Englewood High School*	Marshall Field; Chicago, IL	W 18–5		
September 21	Lombard *	Marshall Field; Chicago, IL	W 38–0		
September 24	Englewood High School*	Marshall Field; Chicago, IL	W 12–0		
September 25	Hyde Park High School*	Marshall Field; Chicago, IL	L 0–6		
September 28	Monmouth (IL)*	Marshall Field; Chicago, IL	W 23–0		
October 2	Milwaukee Medical*	Marshall Field; Chicago, IL	W 12–0		
October 5	Knox*	Marshall Field; Chicago, IL	W 6–0		
October 9	Illinois Wesleyan*	Marshall Field; Chicago, IL	W 22–0		
October 12	Purdue	Marshall Field; Chicago, IL (rivalry)	T 5–5		
October 19	Illinois	Marshall Field; Chicago	L 0–24		
October 23	Hyde Park High School*	Marshall Field; Chicago	W 17–0		
October 26	Penn*	Marshall Field; Chicago, IL	L 0–11		
November 2	Beloit*	Marshall Field; Chicago, IL	T 17–17		
November 9	Northwestern	Marshall Field; Chicago, IL	L 5–6		
November 16	at Michigan	Regents Field; Ann Arbor, MI (rivalry)	L 0–22	3,500	
November 28	Wisconsin	Marshall Field; Chicago, IL	L 0–35	9,000	
*Non-conference game

== Roster ==
Player	Position
James Milton Sheldon (captain)	left halfback
Orville Elbridge Atwood	fullback
Marcus Melvin Beddall	right guard
Alfred Chester Ellsworth	center
Charles Gibbons Flanagan	left tackle
George Henry Garrey	quarterback
Frank Ogilvie Horton	left halfback
Rex Brenton Kennedy	right tackle
Ralph Lemuel Knapp	left guard
James Garfield MacNab	right end
Lee Wilder Maxwell	quarterback
Ernest Earl Perkins	right halfback
Frederick Adolph Speik	left end
Benjamin Strauss	fullback
Platt Milk Conrad	substitute - end
Edson Benton Cooke	substitute - back
Clarke Saxe Jennison	substitute - back
John Jameson Laird	substitute - end
Hiram Boardman Conibear	trainer

- Head coach: Amos Alonzo Stagg (10th year at Chicago)
