= 1901 Illinois Fighting Illini football team =

American college football season

1901 Illinois Fighting Illini football
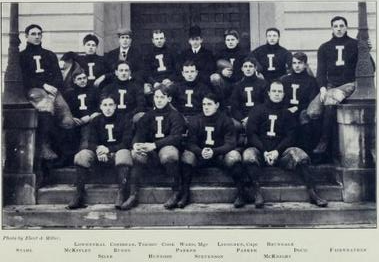
- Conference: Western Conference
- Record: 8–2 (4–2 Western)
- Head coach: Edgar Holt (1st season)
- Captain: Justa Lindgren
- Home stadium: Illinois Field

1901 Western Conference football standings
	Conf.					Overall
Team	W		L		T	W		L		T
Michigan +	4	–	0	–	0	11	–	0	–	0
Wisconsin +	2	–	0	–	0	9	–	0	–	0
Minnesota	3	–	1	–	0	9	–	1	–	1
Illinois	4	–	2	–	0	8	–	2	–	0
Northwestern	3	–	2	–	0	8	–	2	–	1
Indiana	1	–	2	–	0	6	–	3	–	0
Purdue	0	–	3	–	1	4	–	4	–	1
Chicago	0	–	4	–	1	8	–	6	–	2
Iowa	0	–	3	–	0	6	–	3	–	0
+ – Conference co-champions

The 1901 Illinois Fighting Illini football team was an American football team that represented the University of Illinois during the 1901 Western Conference football season. In its first season under head coach Edgar Holt, the team compiled an 8–2 record, finished in fourth place in the Western Conference, and outscored opponents by a total of 243 to 39.

Tackle Justa Lindgren was the team captain. Two Illinois players received honors on the 1901 All-Western college football team:

- Guard Jake Stahl - first-team honors from the Chicago American, Chicago Daily News, Chicago Record-Herald, and Chicago Tribune
- Center Fred Lowenthal - first-team honors from the Chicago American, Chicago Tribune, and Walter Camp.

== Schedule ==
Date	Opponent	Site	Result	Attendance	Source
September 28	Englewood High School*	Illinois Field; Champaign, IL	W 39–0	700	
October 5	Marion Sims*	Illinois Field; Champaign, IL	W 52–0	1,200	
October 11	Chicago Physicians and Surgeons*	Illinois Field; Champaign, IL	W 23–0		
October 12	Washington University*	Illinois Field; Champaign, IL	W 21–0		
October 19	at Chicago	Marshall Field; Chicago, IL	W 24–0		
October 26	Northwestern	Illinois Field; Champaign, IL (rivalry)	L 11–17		
November 2	at Indiana	Newby Oval; Indianapolis, IN (rivalry)	W 18–0		
November 9	at Iowa	Iowa Field; Iowa City, IA	W 27–0	5,000	
November 16	at Purdue	Stuart Field; West Lafayette, IN (rivalry)	W 28–6		
November 28	Minnesota	Illinois Field; Champaign, IL	L 0–16		
*Non-conference game

== Roster ==
1901 Illinois Fighting Illini football team roster
Players
Coaches
Offense

Pos.	#	Name	Class
HB		Martin D. Brundage
OT		H.W. Bundy
TE		James F. Cook
TE		William O. Doud
G		Charles A. Fairweather
HB		Harry A. Huntoon
HB		Lee Jutton
OT		Justa M. Lindgren (C)
C		Arthur Lowenthal
QB		George H. McKinley
FB		William A. McKnight
HB		Roy S. Parker
E		Roderick W. Siler
G		Garland Stahl
QB		Lewis A. Stephenson

Defense

Pos.	#	Name	Class

Special teams

Pos.	#	Name	Class
G		Lawrence T. Allen
OT, G		Bernard C. Capen
HB, FB		C.M. Cayou
HB, G		W. Coons
FB		Walter Dakin
OT		Lawrence S.D. Fairchild
TE		A.E. Logeman
G		Walter F. Smock
G		Clyde E. Stone
C		Joseph W. Wilson

Head coach

Edgar Holt

Coordinators/assistant coaches

Legend

- (C) Team captain
- (S) Suspended
- (I) Ineligible
- Injured
- Redshirt

Roster
Last update: November 16, 2016
