= 1900 Minnesota Golden Gophers football team =

American college football season

1900 Minnesota Golden Gophers football

Western Conference co-champion
- Conference: Western Conference
- Record: 10–0–2 (3–0–1 Western)
- Head coach: Henry L. Williams (1st season)
- Captain: L. A. "Bert" Page Jr.
- Home stadium: Northrop Field

1900 Western Conference football standings
	Conf.					Overall
Team	W		L		T	W		L		T
Minnesota +	3	–	0	–	1	10	–	0	–	2
Iowa +	2	–	0	–	1	7	–	0	–	1
Wisconsin	2	–	1	–	0	8	–	1	–	0
Michigan	3	–	2	–	0	7	–	2	–	1
Northwestern	2	–	1	–	2	7	–	2	–	3
Chicago	2	–	3	–	1	9	–	5	–	1
Indiana	1	–	2	–	1	4	–	2	–	2
Illinois	1	–	3	–	2	7	–	3	–	2
Purdue	0	–	4	–	0	4	–	4	–	0
+ – Conference co-champions

The 1900 Minnesota Golden Gophers football team represented the University of Minnesota in the 1900 Western Conference football season. In their first year under head coach Henry L. Williams, the Golden Gophers compiled a 10–0–2 record (3–0–1 against Western Conference opponents), finished in a tie for first place in the conference, shut out nine of their twelve opponents, and outscored all opponents by a combined total of 299 to 23. The hiring of Dr. Henry L. Williams for the 1900 season marked the first time the program was led by a full-time, salaried coach.

== Schedule ==
Date	Opponent	Site	Result	Attendance	Source
September 15	Minneapolis Central High*	Northrop Field; Minneapolis, MN	T 0–0		
September 22	St. Paul Central High*	Northrop Field; Minneapolis, MN	W 26–0		
September 26	Macalester*	Northrop Field; Minneapolis, MN	W 66–0		
September 29	Carleton*	Northrop Field; Minneapolis, MN	W 44–0		
October 6	Iowa State*	Northrop Field; Minneapolis, MN	W 27–0		
October 13	Chicago	Northrop Field; Minneapolis, MN	T 6–6		
October 20	Grinnell*	Northrop Field; Minneapolis, MN	W 26–0		
October 27	North Dakota*	Northrop Field; Minneapolis, MN	W 34–0		
November 3	Wisconsin	Northrop Field; Minneapolis, MN (rivalry)	W 6–5		
November 10	Illinois	Northrop Field; Minneapolis, MN	W 23–0		
November 17	Northwestern	Northrop Field; Minneapolis, MN	W 21–0	2,500	
November 29	at Nebraska*	Antelope Field; Lincoln, NE (rivalry)	W 20–12		
*Non-conference game
