= James H. Horne =

American football, basketball, baseball, and track and field coach, athletic director

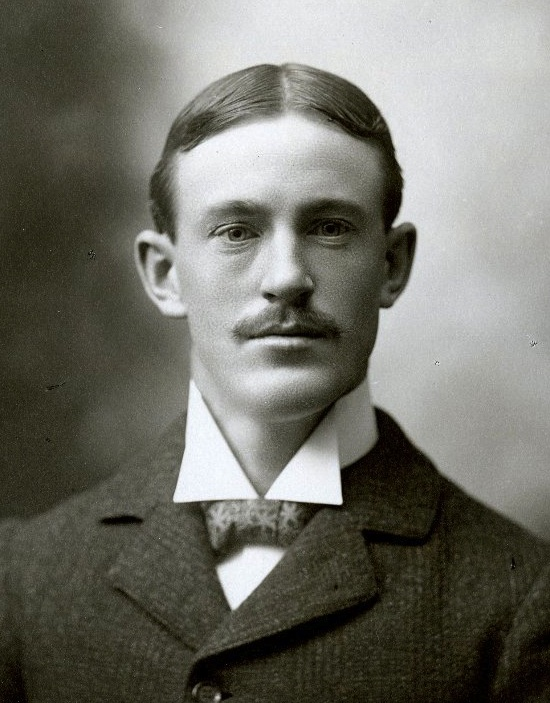

Biographical details
- Born: July 24, 1874; Berlin, New Hampshire, U.S.
- Died: April 13, 1959 (aged 84); Salem, New Hampshire, U.S.
- Education: Bowdoin College

Coaching career (HC unless noted)

Football
- 1898–1904: Indiana

Basketball
- 1900–1901: Indiana

Baseball
- 1899–1900: Indiana

Track and field
- c. 1903: Indiana

Administrative career (AD unless noted)
- 1898–1905: Indiana

Head coaching record
- Overall: 33–21–5 (football); 1–4 (basketball); 10–8 (baseball)

James Howard Horne (July 24, 1874 – April 13, 1959) was an athletic director and coach of American football, basketball, baseball, and track and field at Indiana University between 1898 and 1905.

== Early life and education ==
Horne was born July 24, 1874 in Berlin, New Hampshire to John Roberts Horne and Sarah (Wheeler) Horne. Like his two older brothers, Irving Williams Horne and Rev. John Roberts Horne Jr., James H. Horne attended Bowdoin College where he was a member of Delta Upsilon and involved in a number of extracurricular activities including football and track and field. Horne was a four-year member of the varsity athletic (track and field) team, serving as the team's captain his junior and senior years. (Note: The Bowdoin Bugel noted that Horne resigned as the captain of the varsity athletic team in his senior year. The website of the Bowdoin College track and field/cross country teams notes that he was the captain only in 1896.) In the first two years of what has become the annual "State Meet" between Bates College, Colby College, and Bowdoin, Horne won the 100-yard dash (1895, 1896), 120 yard high hurdles (1895, 1896), 220 yard dash (1895), 220 intermediate hurdles (1896), and long jump (1896). In 1896, his time of 16.2 seconds in the 110 hurdles was the fourth best time in the nation. Horne graduated from Bowdoin in 1897 with an A.B.

== Athletic director ==
While at Bowdoin, Horne held the position of Assistant to the Director of the Gymnasium from 1895 to 1897. From 1897 to 1898, he was "in charge of [the] Gymnasium" at the Hebron Academy in Hebron, Maine prior to succeeding Madison G. Gonterman as Indiana University's third Director of the Men's Gymnasium in 1898. (Note: A 1912 directory of Bowdoin alumni reported that Horne was a teacher in Hebron, Maine from 1897 to 1898.) However, Horne saw himself as more of a "Director of Athletics" for the school in that he "handled all the business of that line, making all schedules, looking up and hiring coaches, as well as all the business affairs connected with athletics." During Horne's tenure as athletic director, Indiana was admitted membership to the Big Ten Conference in December, 1899. He served as IU's director until 1905 and was succeeded by Zora G. Clevenger.

== Coach ==
Horne also replaced Gonterman as the head coach of the Indiana Hoosiers football team from 1898 to 1904, compiling a record of 33–21–5. In his first game at the helm, he led the Hoosiers to a 16–0 victory over Rose Polytechnic. Horne's second season at IU was his best with a 6–2 record, including five shutouts and the school's first triumph over in-state rival Purdue on Thanksgiving Day 1899. During the 1900 college football season, he became the first football coach at Indiana to compete in the Big Ten Conference, then known as the Western Conference. Horne was eventually replaced by James M. Sheldon for the 1905 season.

Horne became Indiana University's first baseball coach in 1899 and tallied a mark of 10–8 over two seasons. In April 1899, he split his first two games with Borden Institute, losing the first 4–3 and winning the following day 12–1. Robert Wicker took over Horne's duties as head coach in 1901.

The first men's basketball team at Indiana University was also coached by Horne. On February 8, 1901, the Hoosiers traveled by train to Indianapolis where they lost their first game to Butler, 20–17. After losing their next two against Butler and Purdue, Horne coached the team to its first ever victory with a 26–17 win over Wabash in Bloomington one month later. Horne is officially credited with coaching Indiana to a 1–4 record in his only season at the helm, however, he was closely involved with the team for three more seasons. (Note: The official records of Indiana University and Purdue University indicate that Indiana lost to Purdue 23–19 in West Lafayette on March 15, 1901, however, the Indiana University Basketball Encyclopedia by Jason Hiner notes that an absence of newspaper reports about the game suggests that it never took place. That source lists Horne's record for the inaugural season as 1–3.)

In addition to football, baseball, and basketball, Horne coached track at IU where he introduced LeRoy Samse to the pole vault. Samse earned a silver medal in the pole vault at the 1904 Summer Olympics. In 1903, Horne accidentally killed the captain of the track team, Bruce Lockridge, the uncle of novelist Ross Lockridge Jr., with an errant throw of a twelve-pound hammer in Louisville. One report indicated that he was so distraught that he attempted suicide.

== Later life ==
A 1912 directory of Bowdoin alumni reported that Horne was in "business" in Conway, New Hampshire after 1906, and a 1917 directory of Delta Upsilon members placed him in "business" in Wolfboro Falls, New Hampshire. His World War I draft registration card notes that he had "total loss of hearing." Horne wrote about his experiences at Indiana University in a letter dated May 14, 1948. He would die in 1959 in Salem, New Hampshire at the age of 84.

== Head coaching record ==
=== Football ===
Year	Team	Overall	Conference	Standing	Bowl/playoffs
Indiana Hoosiers (Independent) (1898–1899)
1898	Indiana	4–1–2			
1899	Indiana	6–2			
Indiana Hoosiers (Big Ten Conference) (1900–1904)
1900	Indiana	4–2–2	1–2–1	7th	
1901	Indiana	6–3	1–2	6th	
1902	Indiana	3–5–1	0–4	T–8th	
1903	Indiana	4–4	1–2	6th	
1904	Indiana	6–4	0–3	T–7th	
Indiana:		33–21–5	3–13–1		
Total:		33–21–5			

=== Basketball ===
Record table
Season	Team	Overall	Conference	Standing	Postseason
Indiana Hoosiers (Independent) (1900–1901)
1900–01	Indiana	1–4			
Indiana:		1–4			
Total:		1–4			

=== Baseball ===
Record table
Season	Team	Overall	Conference	Standing	Postseason
Indiana Hoosiers (Independent) (1899–1900)
1899	Indiana	7–6			
1900	Indiana	3–2			
Indiana:		10–8			
Total:		10–8			
