= 1900 Michigan Wolverines football team =

American college football season

1900 Michigan Wolverines football
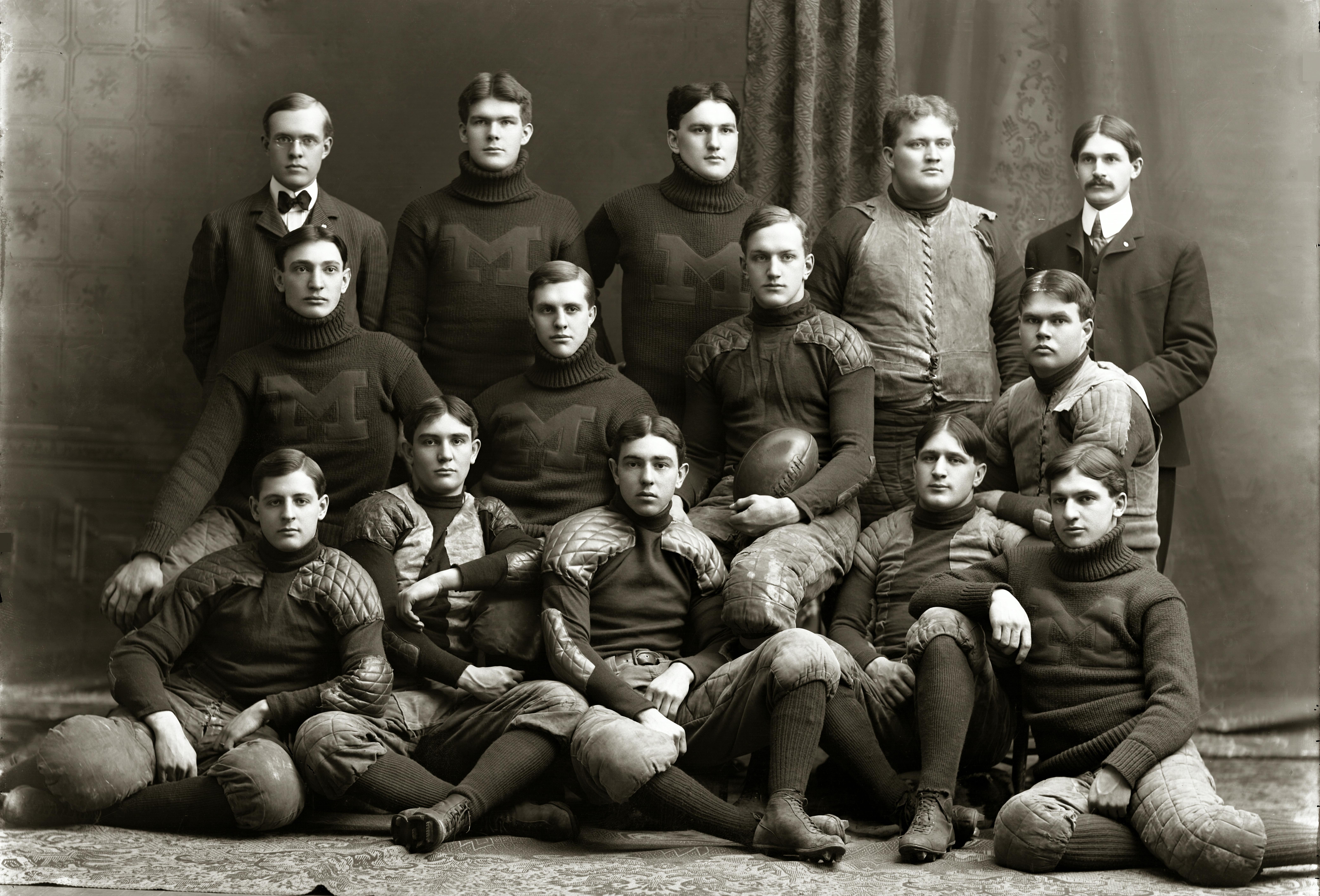
- Conference: Western Conference
- Record: 7–2–1 (3–2 Western)
- Head coach: Langdon Lea (1st season)
- Captain: Neil Snow
- Home stadium: Regents Field

1900 Western Conference football standings
	Conf.					Overall
Team	W		L		T	W		L		T
Minnesota +	3	–	0	–	1	10	–	0	–	2
Iowa +	2	–	0	–	1	7	–	0	–	1
Wisconsin	2	–	1	–	0	8	–	1	–	0
Michigan	3	–	2	–	0	7	–	2	–	1
Northwestern	2	–	1	–	2	7	–	2	–	3
Chicago	2	–	3	–	1	9	–	5	–	1
Indiana	1	–	2	–	1	4	–	2	–	2
Illinois	1	–	3	–	2	7	–	3	–	2
Purdue	0	–	4	–	0	4	–	4	–	0
+ – Conference co-champions

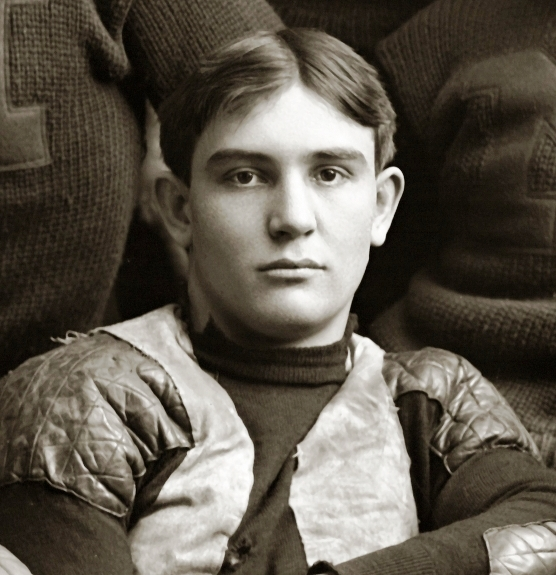
Fullback Everett Sweeley returned two kickoffs for touchdowns of 100 and 105 yards.

The 1900 Michigan Wolverines football team was an American football team that represented the University of Michigan in the 1900 Western Conference football season. In their first and only season under head coach Langdon Lea, the team compiled a 7–2–1 record (3–2 against conference opponents), finished fourth in the Western Conference, and outscored opponents by a total of 117 to 55. Michigan opened the season with six wins, but went 1–2–1 in the final four games, including losses to Iowa and Chicago.

Right end Neil Snow was the captain of the 1900 team. Right halfback Daniel Woodard was the team's leading scorer with 25 points on five touchdowns (five points each). Fullback Everett Sweeley added 22 points on two touchdowns (both long kickoff returns), seven kicks for goal after touchdown (one point each), and a field goal (five points). Tackle Hugh White also had 20 points on four touchdowns.

After the 1900 season, Langdon Lea left Michigan to become the head coach at his alma mater, Princeton. Michigan hired Fielding H. Yost as its head football coach for the 1901 season.

== Schedule ==
Date	Opponent	Site	Result	Attendance
September 29	Hillsdale*	Regents Field; Ann Arbor, MI	W 29–0	300
October 6	Kalamazoo*	Regents Field; Ann Arbor, MI	W 11–0	
October 13	Case*	Regents Field; Ann Arbor, MI	W 24–6	
October 20	Purdue^{†}	Regents Field; Ann Arbor, MI	W 11–6	2,500
October 27	vs. Illinois	Marshall Field; Chicago, IL (rivalry)	W 12–0	8,000–10,000
November 3	Indiana	Regents Field; Ann Arbor, MI	W 12–0	2,000
November 10	vs. Iowa	Bennett Park; Detroit, MI	L 5–28	5,000
November 17	Notre Dame*	Regents Field; Ann Arbor, MI (rivalry)	W 7–0	
November 24	Ohio State*	Regents Field; Ann Arbor, MI (rivalry)	T 0–0	3,000
November 29	at Chicago	Marshall Field; Chicago, IL (rivalry)	L 6–15	10,000
*Non-conference game; ^{†}Homecoming

== Season summary ==
=== Preseason ===
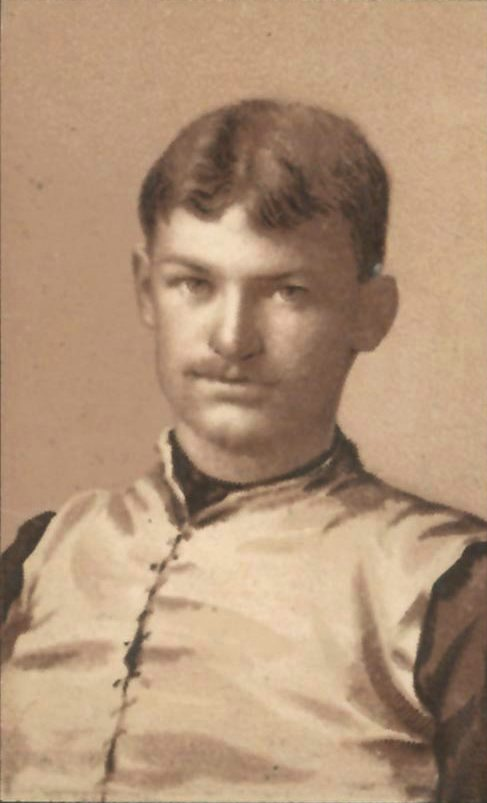
Head coach Langdon Lea

In 1900, Michigan hired Langdon Lea, who had played for Princeton from 1892 to 1895, as its head football coach. A newspaper reported on expectations raised by his hiring: "Coach Langdon Lea, the famous Princetonian, is expected to revolutionize affairs among the Wolverines and to raise the team to its old standing. The great trouble in the past few years has been the lack of efficient coaching, and it is hoped that Lea will supply that necessary." Another newspaper reported on the hiring of Lea away from Princeton this way: "Langdon Lea, better known as 'Biffy,' is to coach the Michigan university team. This practice of putting well known eastern football players in charge of the teams of western universities has certainly improved the standard of play, and in many instances has often wrought havoc with the alma maters of the coaches. Some years ago the big eastern colleges tried to prevent their graduates from accepting positions as coaches on other teams, but the fat salaries offered were inducements too great to be cast aside."

Lea brought with him Martin V. Bergen, another Princeton alumnus, as his assistant coach in charge of the backs.

Training camp got underway on approximately September 25 with coaches Lea and Bergen. Lea expressed concern with the team's lack of depth at the tackle, guard, and center positions.

=== Week 1: Hillsdale ===
Hillsdale at Michigan

Team	1	2	Total
Hillsdale	0	0	0
• Michigan	18	11	29

- Date: September 29
- Location: Regents Field, Ann Arbor, MI
- Game attendance: 300

On September 29, 1900, Michigan opened its season with a 29–0 victory over Hillsdale in front of a crowd of approximately 300 members of the Athletic Association at Regents Field in Ann Arbor. The game was played in two halves of 10 minutes. The whole game lasted approximately 30 minutes.

Michigan scored five touchdowns (worth five points each) and kicked four goals from touchdown (worth one point each). The touchdowns were scored by the left halfback Edward Everett Webber, right halfback Daniel Woodard (two), left end Charles Woodhams, and fullback Everett Sweeley. The goals were kicked by Webber (three) and Sweeley. Woodhams blocked a Hillsdale punt and recovered it over the goal line for his touchdown. Sweeley's touchdown was scored on a 100-yard kickoff return.

After the game, Michigan coach Langdon Lea conducted a football tutorial for both the Michigan and Hillsdale players.

=== Week 2: Kalamazoo ===
Kalamazoo at Michigan

Team	1	2	Total
Kalamazoo	0	0	0
• Michigan	6	5	11

- Date: October 6
- Location: Regents Field, Ann Arbor, MI

On October 6, 1900, Michigan defeated Kalamazoo by an 11–0 score at Regents Field in Ann Arbor. On the opening kickoff, Everett Sweeley took the ball at the five-yard line and ran 105 yards (the field was 110 yards in 1900) for a touchdown behind excellent interference from his Michigan teammates, including Neil Snow. Edward Everett Webber kicked the goal from touchdown to give Michigan a 6–0 lead. In the second half, Hugh White scored Michigan's second touchdown on a two-yard run, and Snow missed the kick for goal from touchdown. Ned Begle had a 60-yard punt for Michigan. The game was played in 15-minute halves.

=== Week 3: Case ===
On October 13, 1900, Michigan defeated Case Scientific School by a 24–6 score at Regents Field in Ann Arbor. Michigan scored on touchdowns by Edward Everett Webber, Tom Marks, Frank Boggs, and Ned Begle. Michigan converted all four goals from touchdown (two by Webber and one each by Neil Snow and Albert E. Herrnstein). Michigan's defense held Case to only two first downs in the game. Case scored when a Michigan punt from inside the five-yard line was blocked and recovered by left end Peterka across Michigan's goal line. The game was played in 20-minute halves. After the game, coach Lea said: "I have only to say that the team played altogether too slow. They were slow in lining up and slow in calling signals. . . . About Case scoring, the fault lies with the line for not holding and with Begle for being too slow punting."

=== Week 4: Purdue ===
Purdue at Michigan

Team	1	2	Total
Purdue	6	0	6
• Michigan	0	11	11

- Date: October 20
- Location: Regents Field, Ann Arbor, MI
- Game attendance: 2,500

On October 20, 1900, Michigan opened its Western Conference schedule with an 11–6 win over Purdue before a homecoming crowd of 2,500 at Regents Field. The game was played in 25-minute halves. Michigan gained 301 yards in the game, and the line limited Purdue to only one first down. Sweeley also received praise for his punting, including one instance where he recovered his own punt. Purdue's touchdown came when Sweeley lost a punt in the sun, fumbled it at Michigan's 39-yard line, and a Purdue player (Miller) returned it for a touchdown. Right halfback Daniel Woodard scored Michigan's first touchdown, and Sweeley missed the kick for goal. Left tackle Hugh White scored Michigan's second touchdown, and Sweeley kicked the goal. White's touchdown came on a play in which Neil Snow blocked a Purdue punt, and White recovered the loose ball over the goal line.

=== Week 5: vs. Illinois ===
Michigan vs. Illinois

Team	1	2	Total
• Michigan	12	0	12
Illinois	0	0	0

- Date: October 27
- Location: Marshall Field, Chicago
- Game attendance: 8,000–10,000

On October 27, 1900, Michigan defeated Illinois by a 12–0 score before a crowd estimated at between 8,000 and 10,000 persons at Marshall Field in Chicago. Michigan fans occupied the east bleachers, and Illinois fans with their band the west bleachers. An additional 2,000 students listened to the returns at the campus gymnasium in Ann Arbor. The game began at 2:43 p.m. Left halfback Daniel Woodard scored Michigan's first touchdown on a two-yard run in the first half, and Everett Sweeley kicked for goal. Later in the first half, right tackle Hugh White ran one yard for a touchdown, and Sweeley again kicked for goal. Neither team scored in the second half.

=== Week 6: Indiana ===
Indiana at Michigan

Team	1	2	Total
Indiana	0	0	0
• Michigan	6	6	12

- Date: November 3
- Location: Regents Field, Ann Arbor, MI
- Game attendance: 2,000

On November 3, 1900, Michigan defeated Indiana by a 12–0 score before a crowd of 2,000 persons at Regents Field in Ann Arbor. The game was played in halves of 25 and 20 minutes. Indiana's players outweighed the Michigan players and utilized "Pennsylvania's guards back formation" to capitalize on their superior weight. However, Michigan's defense held and did not allow the Hoosiers to score. The game was marked by "rough play", including an Indiana player slugging Curtis Redden in the face, though unseen by the umpire. Right halfback Daniel Woodard scored Michigan's first touchdown on a short run in the first half, and Everett Sweeley kicked for goal. In the second half, Indiana attempted to punt from behind the goal line, and the ball hit the cross bar of the goal. The ball bounced backward, and Redden fell on it for Michigan's second touchdown. Sweeley again kicked for goal. After the game, Michigan trainer Keene Fitzpatrick noted: "Indiana has a heavy team; I believe it is the heaviest I ever saw Michigan play against here in the west."

=== Week 7: vs. Iowa ===
Iowa vs. Michigan

Team	1	2	Total
• Iowa	17	11	28
Michigan	0	5	5

- Date: November 10
- Location: Bennett Park, Detroit
- Game attendance: 5,000

On November 10, 1900, Michigan lost to Iowa by a 28–5 score at Bennett Park in Detroit. The game drew 5,000 persons, the largest crowd to watch a football game in Detroit to that time. In the hours before the game began, large numbers of Michigan fans arrived in Detroit and paraded through the city streets behind their band, wearing ribbons, blowing horns, and singing songs. However, the large and boisterous Michigan crowd had no impact on Iowa. Michigan's student newspaper described the Iowa attack as follows: "Iowa has developed team work that is little short of wonderful. Their tandem plays and shell-like formations sent the man with the ball for an almost sure gain in every scrimmage." Everett Sweeley accounted for Michigan's only points on a field goal from place kick (field goals were worth five points under 1900 rules) from the thirty-five yard line just before the end of the second half. The game was played in 35-minute halves.

=== Week 8: Notre Dame ===
Notre Dame at Michigan

Team	1	2	Total
Notre Dame	0	0	0
• Michigan	7	0	7

- Date: November 17
- Location: Regents Field, Ann Arbor, MI

On November 17, 1900, Michigan defeated Pat O'Dea's Notre Dame team by a 7–0 score at Regents Field in Ann Arbor. Early in the game, Notre Dame fumbled a punt, and Michigan recovered the ball at Notre Dame's 10-yard line. Left halfback Arthur Redner then "took a cross buck" and ran through Notre Dame's left tackle for a touchdown. A short time later, Notre Dame fullback Louis J. Salmon attempted to punt from deep in Notre Dame territory. The snap went wide, and the ball rolled over the goal line. Salmon picked up the ball, but he was tackled by Redner for a safety. Both Michigan scores came in the first ten minutes of the game, and Notre Dame dominated the line of scrimmage for the remainder of the game. Salmon starred for Notre Dame and was praised for his punting and ball carrying. Michigan's Neil Snow did not play due to injury. The game was played in halves of 25 and 20 minutes.

=== Week 9: Ohio State ===
Ohio State at Michigan

Team	1	2	Total
Ohio State	0	0	0
Michigan	0	0	0

- Date: November 24
- Location: Regents Field, Ann Arbor, MI
- Game attendance: 3,000

On November 24, 1900, Michigan and Ohio State played to a scoreless tie before a crowd of 3,000 spectators at Regents Field in Ann Arbor. Three trains from Ohio, two from Columbus and one from Toledo, poured into Ann Arbor on the morning of the game, bringing 1,200 Ohio State fans "[b]edecked in cardinal and gray ribbons and flourishing gaudy Ohio banners". The U. of M. Daily noted that the Ohio fans "took the town by storm" and that 200 Ohio State female students "set a worthy example for the girls at Michigan."

As the game commenced at 2:30 p.m., snow and sleet began falling. The field became muddy and slippery, making it difficult for either team's ball carriers to gain traction or speed in advancing the ball. Ohio utilized "straight football" while on offense with McClaren and Westwater as the main ball carriers. During the second half, Michigan employed a "tandem formation" in an effort to aggregate sufficient weight to gain ground on the slippery field. Michigan advanced to Ohio State's 13-yard line in the second half, but came up a half inch short of the five yards required for first down and lost the ball on downs. Everett Sweeley and Neil Snow were the stars of the game for Michigan. In the second half, with the wind in Michigan's favor, "Sweeley's kicking gave Michigan an advantage, and the play was entirely in Ohio's territory." Despite the Wolverines' inability to score, The U. of M. Daily wrote that the team "put up the best game it has shown this season with the possible exception of the Illinois game." The game was played in 25-minute halves.

After the game, coach Lea said: "The team played good but not fast enough. . . . The tandem play seemed in a measure to help on the slippery field, but it is a poor play and only good for short gains, while it tired out the whole team. We shall cut it out in future."

=== Week 10: at Chicago ===
Michigan at Chicago

Team	1	2	Total
Michigan	6	0	6
• Chicago	5	10	15

- Date: November 29
- Location: Marshall Field, Chicago
- Game attendance: 10,000

On Thanksgiving Day, November 29, 1900, Michigan lost to Chicago by a 15–6 score at Marshall Field in Chicago. The game, which started at 2:00 p.m., drew a crowd of 10,000, including 3,000 Michigan rooters in the west bleachers and 4,000 Chicago rooters in the east bleachers.

The Chicago team came into the game as an underdog, having lost five games in a row for the longest losing streak in program history. However, the Maroons had rested for 12 days before the game, while Michigan had played Ohio State only five days earlier. After recovering a fumble deep in Chicago territory, Michigan took a 6-0 lead early in the game on a touchdown by left tackle Hugh White. Everett Sweeley kicked the goal after touchdown. Michigan used the "old Princeton tandem formation" to carry the ball straight down field. After Michigan took its lead, Chicago fullback E. E. Perkins scored three touchdowns, one in the first half and two in the second half. The Chicago Tribune touted Perkins, a backup who appeared in the game wearing a nose protector, as the hero of Chicago. The great Yale football player, Pudge Heffelfinger, served as referee at the game.

=== Post-season ===
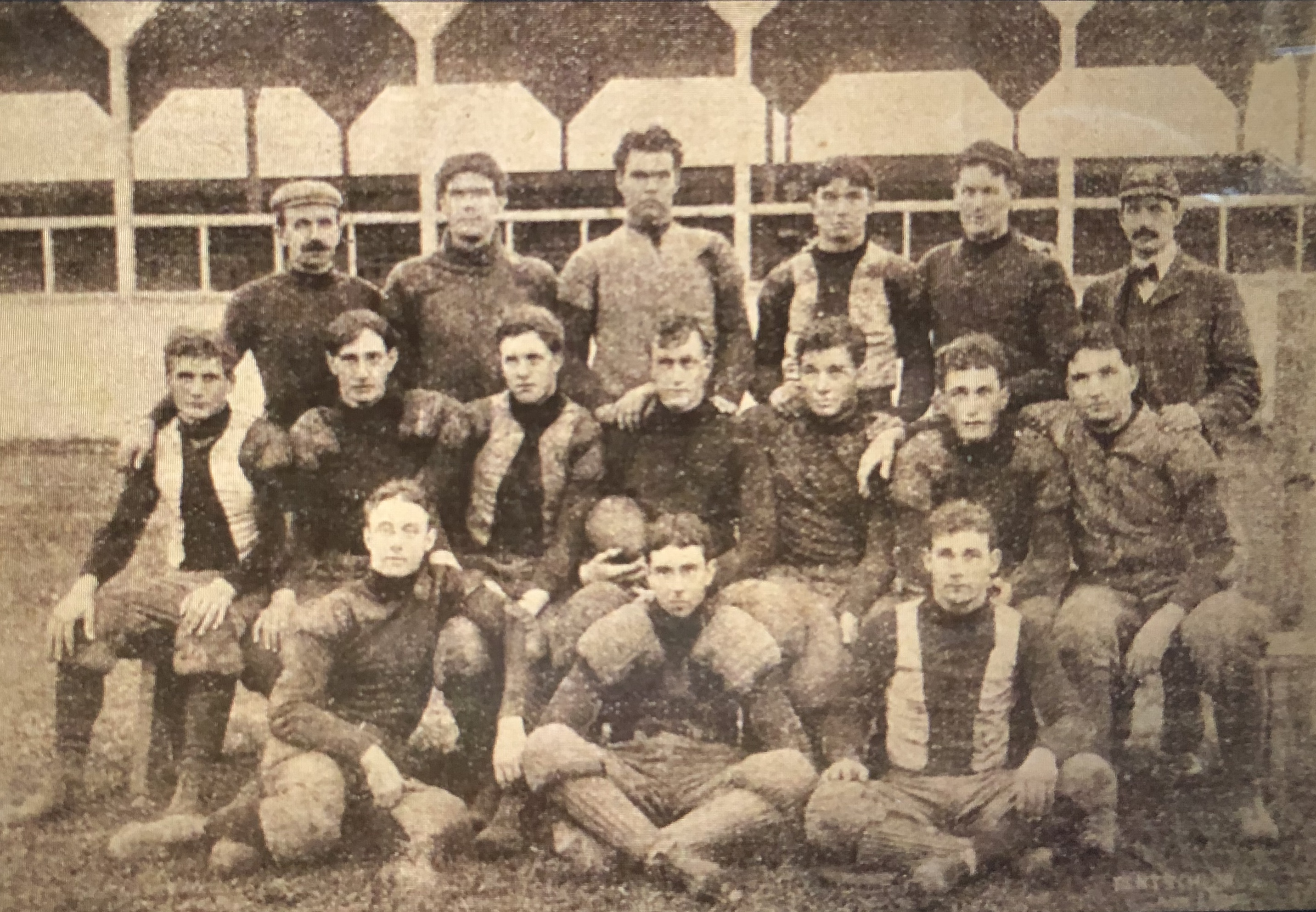
Team photograph by Rentschler

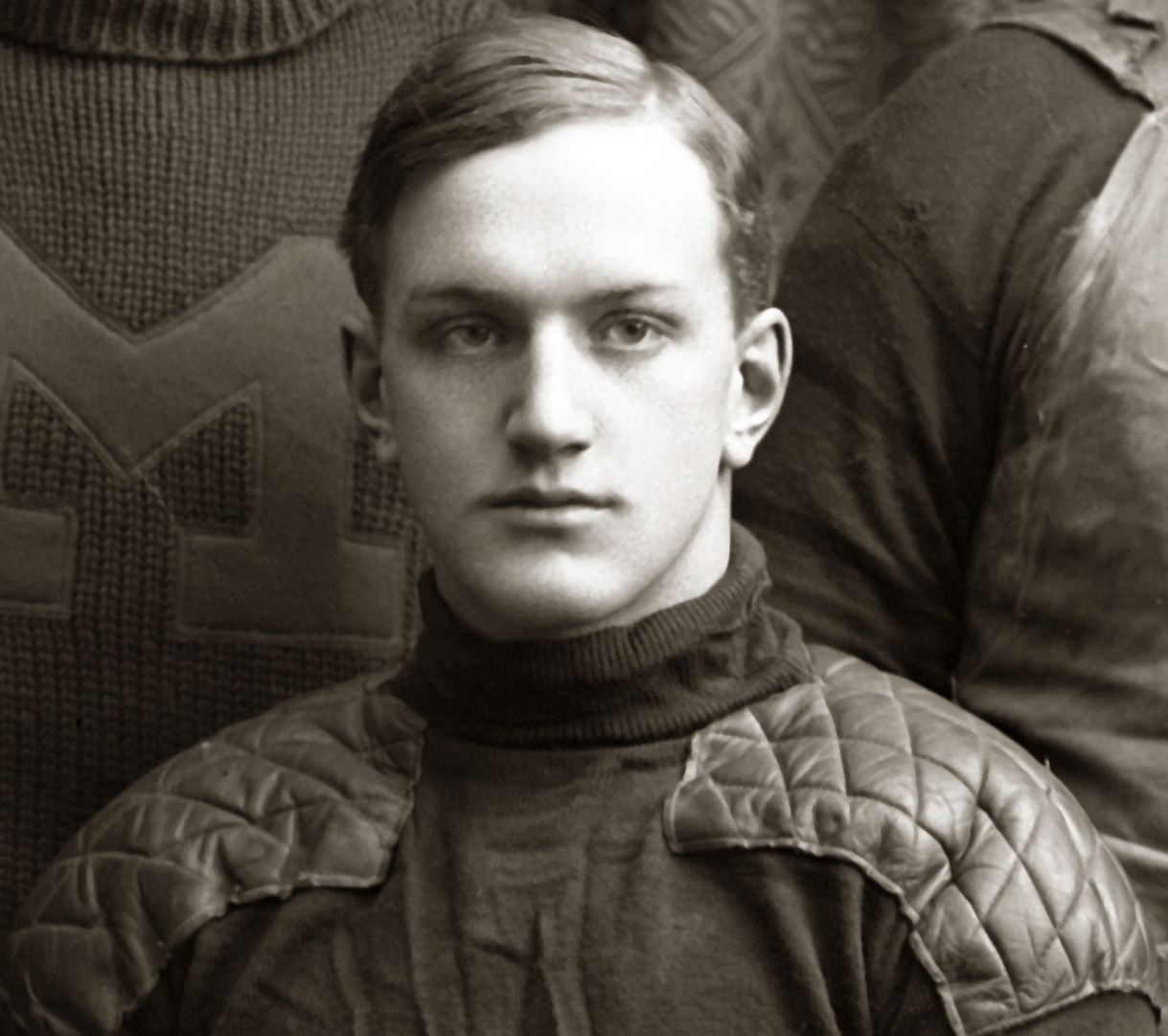
Michigan team captain Neil Snow

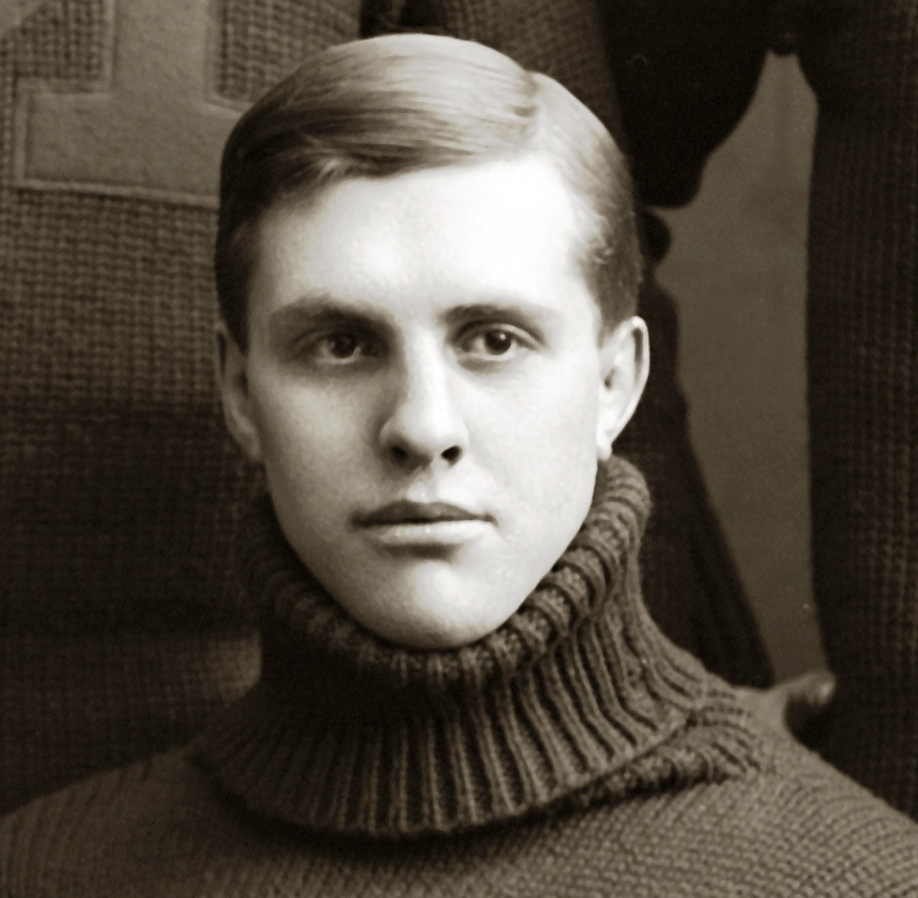
Tackle Hugh White scored four touchdowns.

After the season, Michigan released its football receipts and expenses, showing a small profit as follows:

RECEIPTS
Illinois (net) . . . $1,648
Iowa (net) . . . 2,084
Chicago (net) . . . 4,498
Seven other games (gross) . . . 2,099
Class game . . . 141
Athletic Association dance . . . 117
Mass meeting subscriptions . . . 1,946
Total . . . $12,533
EXPENSES
Deficit on September 1 . . . $1,500
Guarantees (five games) . . . 990
Interscholastic loss . . . 100
Coach Lea . . . 3,500
Scrub Coach Talcott . . . 200
Trainer Fitzpatrick . . . 500
Assistant coach Bergen . . . 170
Football supplies . . . 595
Grand stands . . . 1,629
Sinking fund . . . 2,000
Miscellaneous 1,029
Total . . . $12,213
Balance on hand . . . 320

In February 1901, Langdon Lea was hired as Princeton's head football coach, foregoing a contract renewal at Michigan reported to be worth $4,000.

== Personnel ==
=== Varsity letter winners ===
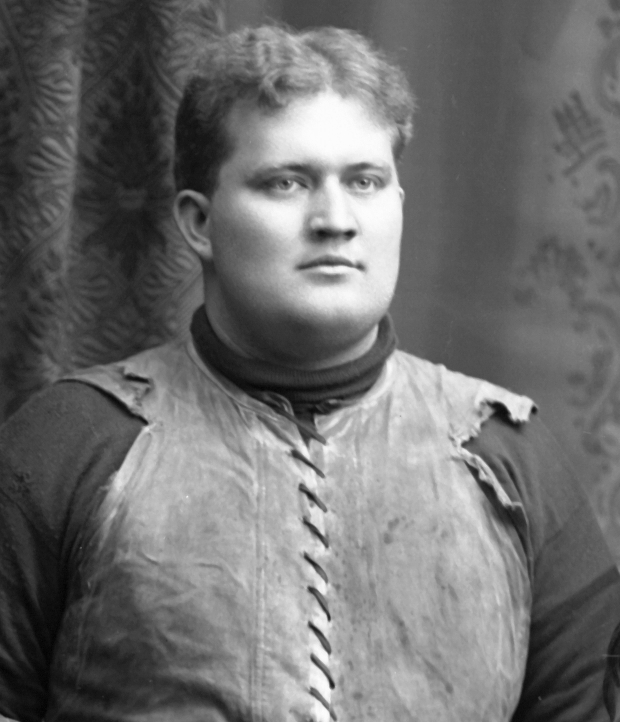
Center Henry R. Brown from Chillicothe, Ohio

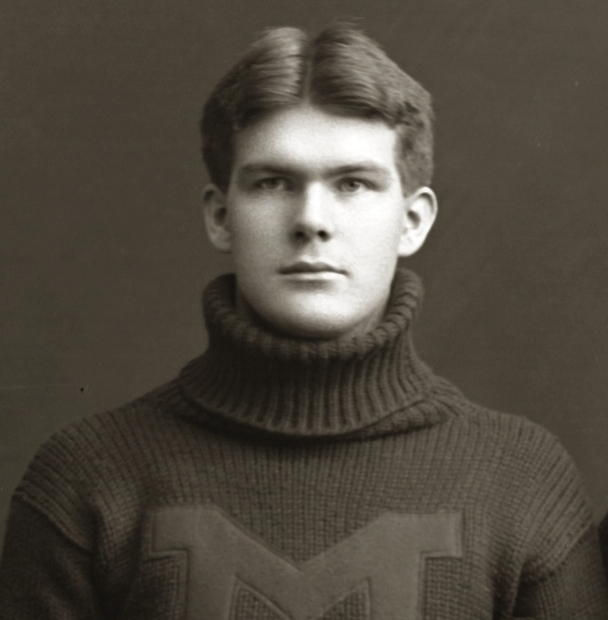
Tackle Bruce Shorts from Mt. Pleasant, Michigan

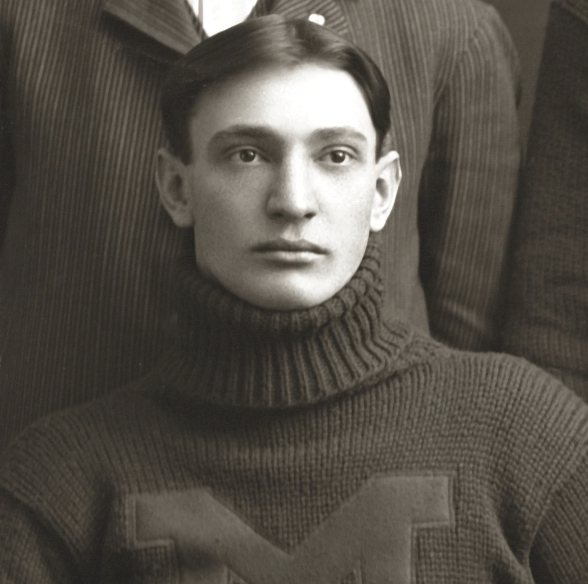
End Curtis Redden from Rossville, Illinois

The following 12 players received varsity "M" letters for their participation on the 1900 football team: Players who started at least half of Michigan's games are displayed in bold.

- **Ned Begle**, Ann Arbor, Michigan – started 3 games at left halfback, 1 game at fullback, 1 game at right halfback
- Henry R. Brown, Chillicothe, Ohio – center
- **Samuel G. Kelly**, Knob Noster, Missouri – started 6 games at right guard, 1 game at left guard
- **Thomas R. Marks**, Indianapolis, Indiana – started 6 games at left guard, 1 game at right tackle
- **Curtis Redden**, Rossville, Illinois – started 10 games at left end, 1 game at right end
- Arthur Redner, Bessemer, Michigan – started 3 games at left halfback
- Walter W. Shaw, Kansas City, Missouri – started 2 games at right halfback
- Bruce Shorts, Mt. Pleasant, Michigan – started 4 games at right tackle
- **Neil Snow**, Detroit, Michigan – started 9 games at right end
- **Everett Sweeley**, Sioux City, Iowa – started 9 games at fullback
- Harrison S. "Boss" Weeks, Allegan, Michigan – started 2 games at quarterback
- **Hugh White**, Lapeer, Michigan – started 7 games at left tackle, 3 games at right tackle

=== Reserves ===
- Charles F. Bliss, Durham, Maine – guard
- Frank Kinney Boggs, Cheboygan, Michigan – started 2 games at right tackle, 1 game at left tackle
- Arthur D. Brookfield, Englewood, Illinois – guard
- Henry J. Brown, Chillicothe, Ohio – started 3 games at center
- George Burns, Fremont, Michigan – guard
- Harry S. Durant, Chicago, Illinois – started 1 game at left tackle
- Philip P. Farnham, Brighton, Michigan – end
- Herbert Spencer Graver, Chicago, Illinois – halfback
- Albert E. Herrnstein, Chillicothe, Ohio – started 1 game at left halfback
- William H. Herrnstein, Chillicothe, Ohio – fullback
- Harvey Wellman Hincks, Manistee, Michigan – halfback
- Joseph C. Horgan, Victor, Colorado – tackle
- **Edwin McGinnis**, Englewood, Illinois – started 8 games at quarterback
- Max (or Albert) Neal, Indiana, Pennsylvania – started 1 game at left end
- Samuel J. Sackett, Ann Arbor, Michigan – halfback
- Benjamin Harrison Southworth, Reading, Michigan – center
- Norman Sterry, Los Angeles, California – tackle
- William T. Walker, Toledo, Ohio – started 1 game at left tackle
- Edward Everett Webber, Austin, Illinois – started 3 games at left halfback, 1 game at right halfback
- Milo T. White, Fremont, Michigan – fullback
- Ebin Wilson, Lapeer, Michigan – started 7 games at center
- Daniel W. Woodard, Clinton, Michigan – started 4 games at right halfback

=== Others ===
- Lee Barkenbus, Kalamazoo, Michigan – started 3 games at left guard

=== Awards and honors ===
- Captain: Neil Snow

=== Coaching and training staff ===
- Coach: Langdon Lea
- Assistant coaches: Martin V. Bergen (backs), William Wilson Talcott (scrubs)
- Trainer: Keene Fitzpatrick
- Manager: Harry K. Crafts

=== Scoring leaders ===
Player	Touchdowns	Extra points	Field goals	Safeties	Total
Daniel Woodard	5	0	0	0	25
Everett Sweeley	2	7	1	0	22
Hugh White	4	0	0	0	20
Edward Everett Webber	2	6	0	0	16
Arthur Redner	1	0	0	1	7
Ned Begle	1	0	0	0	5
Frank Boggs	1	0	0	0	5
Tom Marks	1	0	0	0	5
Curtis Redden	1	0	0	0	5
Charles Woodhams	1	0	0	0	5
Albert E. Herrnstein	0	1	0	0	1
Neil Snow	0	1	0	0	1
Total	19	15	1	1	117
