= Burton Peek =

American businessman (1872–1960)

Burton F. Peek (March 5, 1872 – June 14, 1960) served as both President and Chairman of Deere & Company and was a founding member of Augusta National Golf Club. He was also the great-grandnephew of John Deere.

== Deere & Company ==
Peek began his career at the age of 16 in the shipping department at Deere & Company in Moline, Illinois in 1888. He worked there for 3 years before leaving to study law, eventually founding a successful law practice in 1895. He returned to Deere in 1911 as a director and vice president until June 5, 1942, when he became the fifth president of the company. On October 31, 1944, he became chairman of the board and held this position until his retirement on April 24, 1956. He continued to serve on the board of directors until his death in 1960.

== Augusta National ==
Peek joined Augusta National in 1934, served as a rules official for many years, and was an influential member in the early years of the club. One of the 10 cabins at Augusta National is named in Peek's honor. Peek Cabin and Jones Cabin, built by golfing legend Bobby Jones, were the first two cabins constructed. Peek Cabin stands next to Eisenhower Cabin.

In an early history of Augusta National, Burton Peek was described by longtime club president Clifford Roberts as "our top candidate for top honors as the man who hit the most golf balls in one lifetime.”
