= 1901 Minnesota Golden Gophers football team =

American college football season

1901 Minnesota Golden Gophers football
- Conference: Western Conference
- Record: 9–1–1 (3–1 Western)
- Head coach: Henry L. Williams (2nd season)
- Captain: Warren Knowlton
- Home stadium: Northrop Field

1901 Western Conference football standings
	Conf.					Overall
Team	W		L		T	W		L		T
Michigan +	4	–	0	–	0	11	–	0	–	0
Wisconsin +	2	–	0	–	0	9	–	0	–	0
Minnesota	3	–	1	–	0	9	–	1	–	1
Illinois	4	–	2	–	0	8	–	2	–	0
Northwestern	3	–	2	–	0	8	–	2	–	1
Indiana	1	–	2	–	0	6	–	3	–	0
Purdue	0	–	3	–	1	4	–	4	–	1
Chicago	0	–	4	–	1	8	–	6	–	2
Iowa	0	–	3	–	0	6	–	3	–	0
+ – Conference co-champions

The 1901 Minnesota Golden Gophers football team was an American football team that represented the University of Minnesota in the 1901 Western Conference football season. In its second year under head coach Henry L. Williams, the team compiled a 9–1–1 record (3–1 against Western Conference opponents), finished in third place in the conference, shut out 10 of their 11 opponents, and outscored all opponents by a total of 183 to 18. The only loss came against Wisconsin, which was the only team to score against Minnesota.

Four Minnesota players received honors on the 1901 All-Western college football team:

- Guard John G. Flynn - first-team honors from the Chicago American, Chicago Record-Herald, and Walter Camp
- Center Leroy Albert Page, Jr. - first-team honors from the Chicago Daily News and Chicago Record-Herald
- Tackle Charles W. Fee - first-team honors from the Chicago Daily News
- End Eddie Rogers - first-team honors from the Chicago Tribune

== Schedule ==
Date	Opponent	Site	Result	Attendance	Source
September 21	Minneapolis Central High School*	Northrop Field; Minneapolis, MN	T 0–0		
September 21	Saint Paul Central High School*	Northrop Field; Minneapolis, MN	W 16–0		
September 28	Carleton*	Northrop Field; Minneapolis, MN	W 35–0		
October 5	Chicago Physicians and Surgeons*	Northrop Field; Minneapolis, MN	W 27–0	2,500	
October 12	Nebraska*	Northrop Field; Minneapolis, MN (rivalry)	W 19–0	10,000	
October 26	Iowa	Northrop Field; Minneapolis, MN (rivalry)	W 16–0	10,000	
November 4	Haskell*	Northrop Field; Minneapolis, MN	W 28–0	2,000	
November 9	North Dakota*	Northrop Field; Minneapolis, MN	W 10–0		
November 16	at Wisconsin	Randall Field; Madison, WI (rivalry)	L 0–18	14,000	
November 23	at Northwestern	Marshall Field; Chicago, IL	W 16–0	2,000	
November 28	at Illinois	Illinois Field; Champaign, IL	W 16–0		
*Non-conference game
