= Outing (magazine) =

Former American magazine

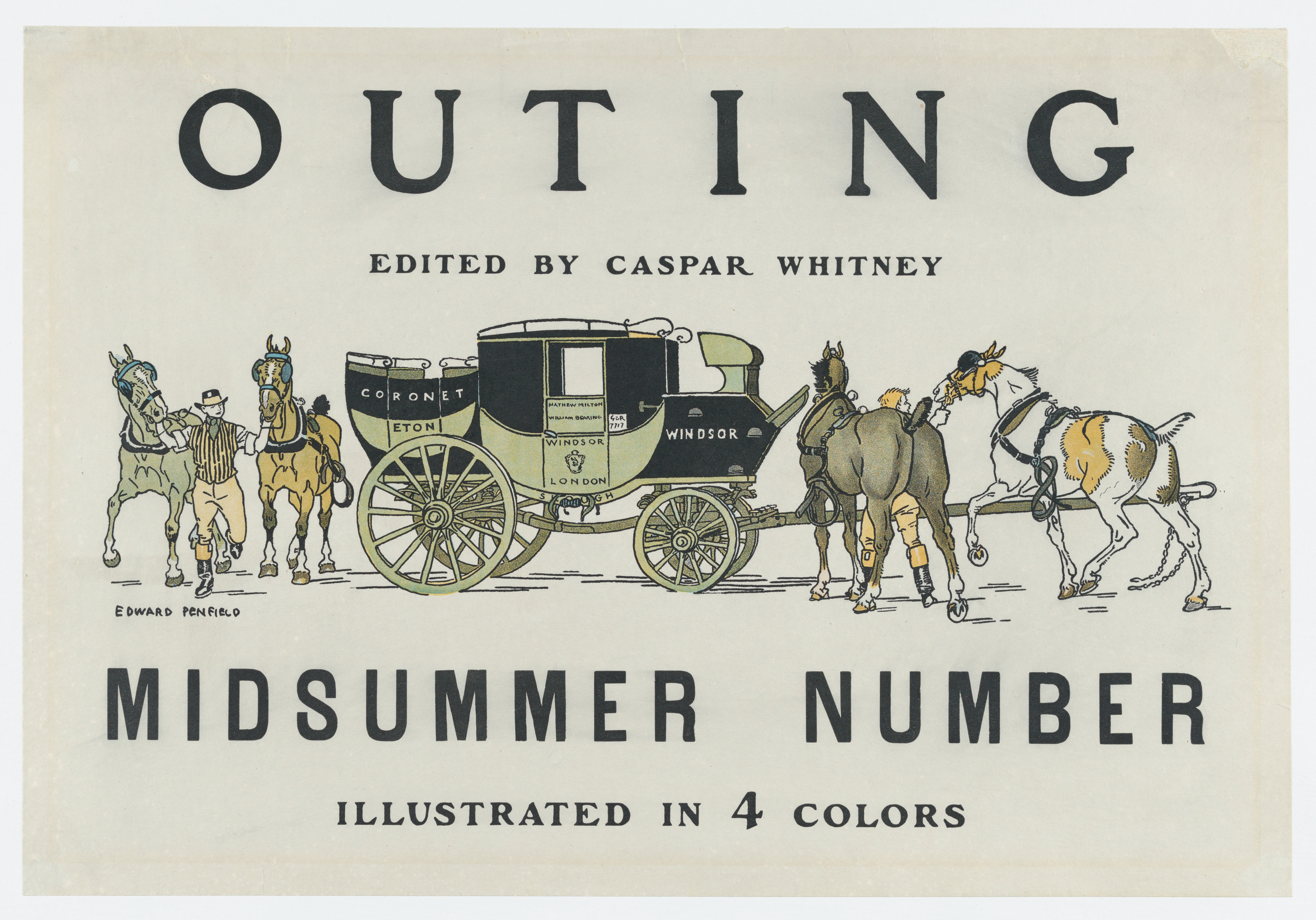
- Edward Penfield poster for Outing, 1890s
- Categories: Outdoor recreation, travel, sports
- Founded: 1882; 144 years ago
- Final issue: 1923; 103 years ago
- Country: United States
- Based in: Boston
- Language: English

Outing (sometimes titled The Outing Magazine) was a late 19th- and early 20th-century American magazine covering a variety of sporting activities. It began publication in 1882 as the Wheelman, "an illustrated magazine of cycling literature and news", and had four title changes before ceasing publication in 1923. It was based in Boston.

Samuel McClure edited the Wheelman for Colonel Albert Pope, Pope Manufacturing Company for bicycles for two years. Bicycling was the first outdoor sport to seize the Americans. Suddenly bicycling was all the rage.

In 1884 it was called Outing and the Wheelman: An Illustrated Monthly Magazine of Recreation. Thomas Stevens became a "special correspondent" that year.

The magazine first published Jack London's novel White Fang in serial form. Frederic Remington submitted commissioned drawings of the Old West.

Outing Publishing Company published Westerns, romances, and outdoor books. It was active in book publishing from 1905 to 1918, when the book list was sold to Macmillan.
