= 1901 All-Western college football team =

American all-star college football team

The 1901 All-Western college football team consists of American football players selected to the All-Western teams chosen by various selectors for the 1901 college football season.

== All-Western selections ==
=== Ends ===
- William Juneau, Wisconsin (CA, CDN-1, CRH, CT, WC)
- Neil Snow, Michigan (CA, CDN-1 [fullback], CRH, WC) (CFHOF)
- Edward L. Rogers, Minnesota (CDN-2, CT)
- Allen Abbott, Wisconsin (CDN-1)
- Albert Herrnstein, Michigan (CDN-2)

=== Tackles ===
- Bruce Shorts, Michigan (CA, CDN-2, CRH, CT, WC)
- Arthur Hale Curtis, Wisconsin (CA, CDN-1, CRH, CT)
- Charles G. Flanagan, Chicago (WC)
- Charles W. Fee, Minnesota (CDN-1)
- Hugh White, Michigan (CDN-2)

=== Guards ===
- John G. Flynn, Minnesota (CA, CDN-2, CRH, WC)
- Jake Stahl, Illinois (CA, CDN-1, CRH, CT)
- Arnie Lerum, Wisconsin (WC)
- Edward S. Merrill, Beloit (CT)
- Ebin Wilson, Michigan (CDN-2)

=== Centers ===
- Fred Lowenthal, Illinois (CA, CT, WC)
- Leroy Albert Page, Jr., Minnesota (CDN-1, CRH)
- Emil Skow, Wisconsin (CDN-2)

=== Quarterbacks ===
- Boss Weeks, Michigan (CA, CDN-1, CRH, WC)
- George H. Garrey, Chicago (CT)
- Albert Marshall, Wisconsin (CDN-2)

=== Halfbacks ===
- Willie Heston, Michigan (CA, CRH, WC) (CFHOF)
- Al Larson, Wisconsin (CA, CDN-1, CRH, CT, WC)
- Eddie Cochems, Wisconsin (CDN-2, CT)
- James M. Sheldon, Chicago (CDN-2)

=== Fullbacks ===
- Everett Sweeley, Michigan (CDN-1 [halfback], CT)
- G. O. Dietz, Northwestern (CDN-1 [guard], WC)
- Earl Driver, Wisconsin (CA, CDN-2, CRH)

== Key ==
CA = Chicago American

CDN = Chicago Daily News

CRH= Chicago Record-Herald

CT = Chicago Tribune

WC = Walter Camp

CFHOF = College Football Hall of Fame

== See also ==
- 1901 College Football All-America Team
