= 1901 Michigan Wolverines football team =

American college football season

1901 Michigan Wolverines football
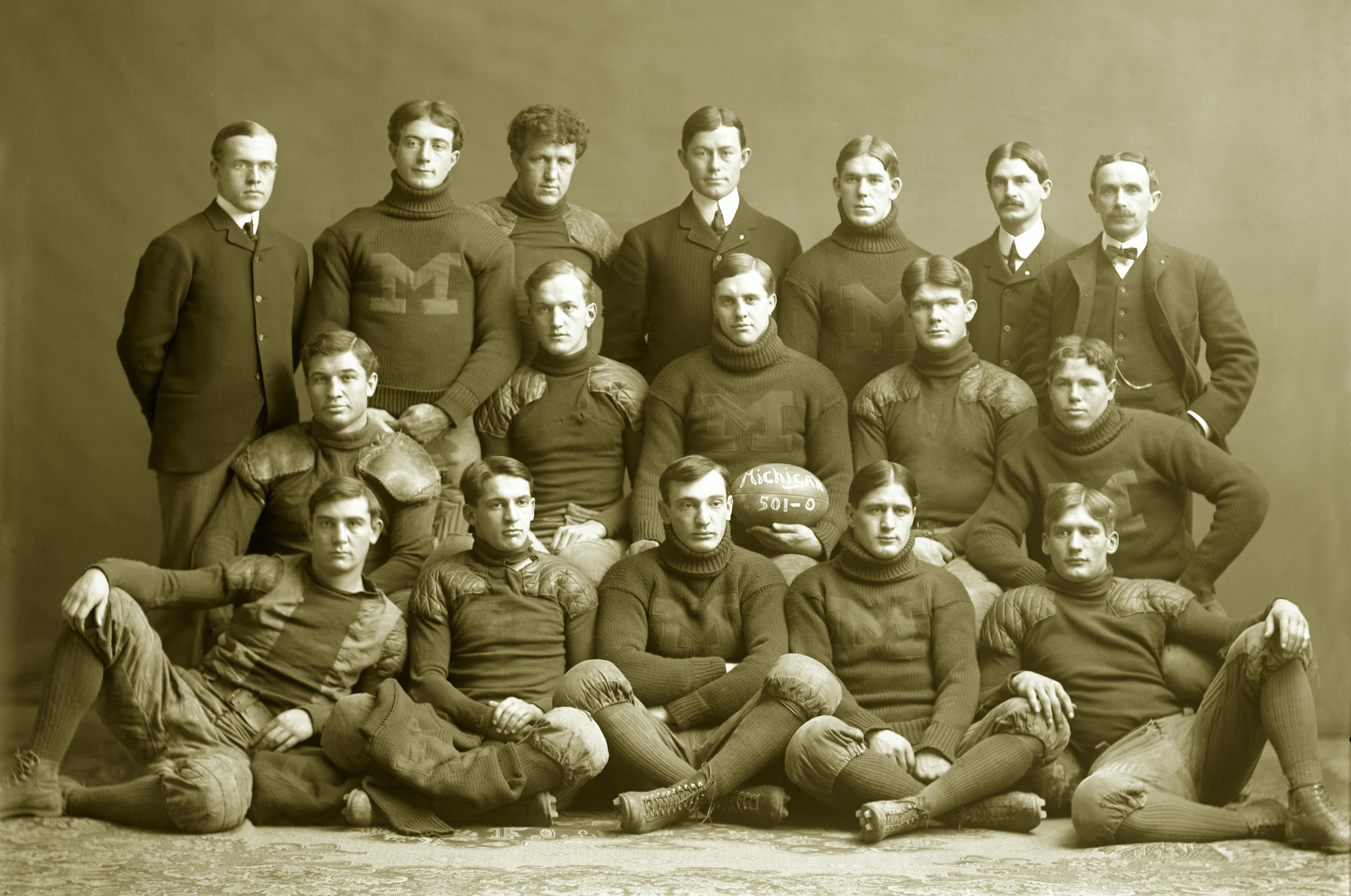

National champion (Helms, Houlgate, NCF) Western Conference co-champion Rose Bowl champion

Rose Bowl, W 49–0 vs. Stanford
- Conference: Western Conference
- Record: 11–0 (4–0 Western)
- Head coach: Fielding H. Yost (1st season)
- Offensive scheme: Short punt
- Captain: Hugh White
- Home stadium: Regents Field

1901 Western Conference football standings
	Conf.					Overall
Team	W		L		T	W		L		T
Michigan +	4	–	0	–	0	11	–	0	–	0
Wisconsin +	2	–	0	–	0	9	–	0	–	0
Minnesota	3	–	1	–	0	9	–	1	–	1
Illinois	4	–	2	–	0	8	–	2	–	0
Northwestern	3	–	2	–	0	8	–	2	–	1
Indiana	1	–	2	–	0	6	–	3	–	0
Purdue	0	–	3	–	1	4	–	4	–	1
Chicago	0	–	4	–	1	8	–	6	–	2
Iowa	0	–	3	–	0	6	–	3	–	0
+ – Conference co-champions

The 1901 Michigan Wolverines football team was an American football team that represented the University of Michigan in the Western Conference during the 1901 Western Conference football season. In their first year under head coach Fielding H. Yost, the team compiled a perfect 11–0 record, outscored its opponents by a combined total of 550 to 0, tied with Wisconsin for the Western Conference championship, and defeated Stanford by a 49 to 0 score in the inaugural Rose Bowl game, the first college bowl game ever played. Northwestern (8–2–1) had the best record of a Michigan opponent, however Michigan still managed to win 29–0. The 1901 team was the first of Yost's famed "Point-a-Minute" teams, so named for their high scoring offense. From 1901 to 1905, Yost's Michigan teams compiled a record of 55–1–1 and outscored their opponents by a combined score of 2,821 to 42.

Although no system was in place during this era to determine a national champion, the NCAA recognizes as "major" certain selectors who have sought to establish national championships retrospectively. Three of the five major selectors, Helms Athletic Foundation in 1941, Houlgate System after 1926, and the National Championship Foundation in 1980, recognized the 1901 Michigan team as the national champion, despite contrary contemporaneous accounts. Parke H. Davis in 1933 selected 12–0 Harvard as national champion. (Note: Parke Davis' selection for 1901, as published in the 1934 Spalding's Foot Ball Guide, was Harvard. Until it was amended in 2026, the NCAA Record Book stated his selection as Yale for 1901, an error that had been perpetuated since the first appearance of Davis' selections in the NCAA book.) The 1901 team holds the distinction of having won the first national championship claimed by the Michigan Wolverines football program.

Several players from the team received individual honors. Fullback/end Neil Snow was selected as a first-team player on Caspar Whitney's 1901 All-America Team. Halfback Willie Heston was selected as a third-team player on Walter Camp's 1901 and 1902 All-America Teams and as a first-team player on Camp's 1903 and 1904 All-America Teams. In addition, five Michigan players received first-team honors on the 1901 All-Western college football team. They are Snow, Heston, quarterback Boss Weeks, tackle Bruce Shorts, and fullback/halfback Everett Sweeley. The team captain was tackle, Hugh White.

Four individuals associated with the team have been inducted into the College Football Hall of Fame. They are Yost, Snow, Heston, and assistant coach Bennie Owen, who later went on to fame as the head coach at Oklahoma.

== Schedule ==
Date	Time	Opponent	Site	Result	Attendance	Source
September 28		Albion*	Regents Field; Ann Arbor, MI	W 50–0		
October 5		Case*	Regents Field; Ann Arbor, MI	W 57–0		
October 12		Indiana	Regents Field; Ann Arbor, MI	W 33–0	2,000	
October 19		Northwestern	Regents Field; Ann Arbor, MI (rivalry)	W 29–0		
October 26		Buffalo*	Regents Field; Ann Arbor, MI	W 128–0		
November 2		vs. Carlisle*	Bennett Park; Detroit, MI	W 22–0	8,000	
November 9		at Ohio State*	University Park; Columbus, OH (rivalry)	W 21–0	4,000	
November 16		Chicago^{†}	Regents Field; Ann Arbor, MI (rivalry)	W 22–0	3,500	
November 23		Beloit*	Regents Field; Ann Arbor, MI	W 89–0	3,500	
November 28		vs. Iowa	National League Baseball Park; Chicago, IL	W 50–0	10,000	
January 1, 1902	2:30 p.m.	vs. Stanford*	Tournament Park; Pasadena, CA (Rose Bowl)	W 49–0	8,000	
*Non-conference game; ^{†}Homecoming; Source:

== Preseason ==
=== 1900 season ===
The 1900 Michigan team compiled an overall record of 7–2–1 under first-year head coach Langdon Lea. However, the season was considered a disappointment as the Wolverines finished in fifth place in the Western Conference with a 3–2 record against Western Conference opponents and a loss to rival Chicago. In January 1901, coach Lea resigned from Michigan to accept a position as the head football coach at Princeton.

=== Yost's arrival ===
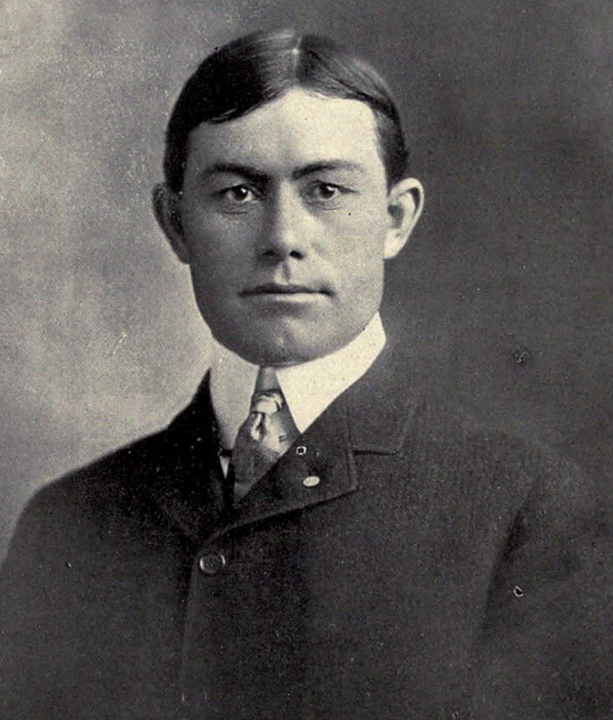
Fielding H. Yost took over as Michigan's coach in 1901.

Fielding Yost was hired as the new coach at Michigan in the spring of 1901. He traveled to Ann Arbor in early April to evaluate the talent pool with which he would be working. After sizing up the players, Yost asked for early practice in the fall. Yost left California in late August and arrived in Ann Arbor on September 4. On arriving in Ann Arbor, Yost said that he was "here to stay until Michigan secured the western championship."

=== Whitmore Lake ===
Several starters from the 1900 team returned to Michigan to participate in the 1901 team, including Boss Weeks, Everett Sweeley, Curtis Redden, Hugh White (the 1901 team captain), Ebin Wilson, Bruce Shorts, Neil Snow, Arthur Redner, and Albert Herrnstein. The strength of the returning roster led to confidence in the 1901 team's prospects.

On September 9, 1901, Yost and captain White gathered a small squad of men at Whitmore Lake; the squad grew over the next two weeks to nearly 20 players. Training continued for nearly two weeks, and "cold baths in the lake soon toughened the men." Yost worked with the players on the rudiments of the game and later recalled that, by the time they returned to Ann Arbor, "we had worked the men down into fairly good training for football work."

In addition to training, Yost spent time at Whitmore Lake evaluating his talent to fit particular positions. He soon shifted players around. He moved the team's only All-American, Neil Snow, from end to fullback on offense, keeping him at right end on defense. Yost moved Arthur Redner from center to right guard and George W. Gregory to center. He also brought Willie Heston with him from California at the halfback position. In a 1952 letter, Heston later recalled: "He brought to Michigan an entirely new brand of football, not known in the Big Ten nor to the Middle West. Particularly, that was true of his offense. Speed and more speed was continually emphasized. Boss Weeks was instructed to call his signal for the next play while the team was getting up from the last play."

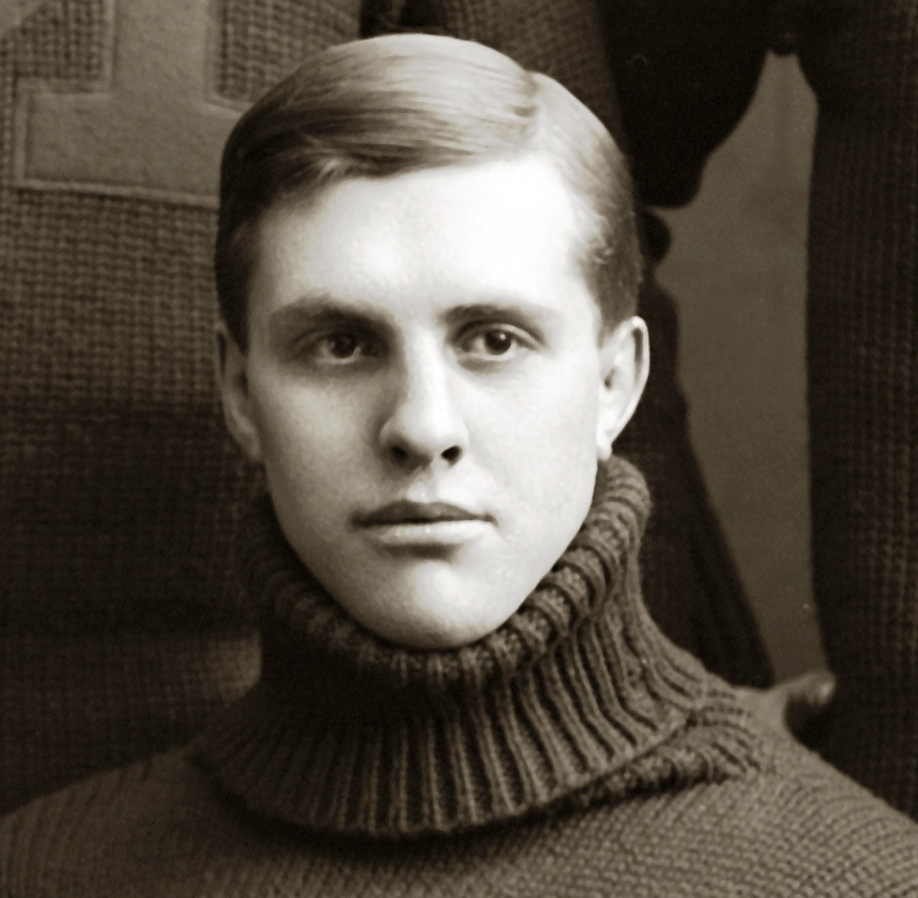
1901 team captain Hugh White

Team captain White recalled the time at Whitmore Lake as follows:

"The work at the Lake was a review in the first principles of the game, a thorough study and quiz upon the rules – something which had been sadly neglected in former years. It was also the first step in the conditioning of the team.

A new freshman, David Banks, wrote a letter to his mother about his experience in trying out for the football team in the fall of 1901:

"I am not sure whether I ought to play football or not. ... I put on Tom's suit one night and went down to the field to meet Yost and a few other men. They made me run around the track a couple times to try my wind. Then they rolled me around the ground and sat on me a while. I did not understand the necessity of all they did to me, but the boys say every great player must begin that way."

On September 24, 1901, the Michigan Daily-News correctly predicted that "Hurry up" would become the future title of Michigan's new coach, Fielding Yost.

== Game summaries ==
=== Week 1: Albion ===
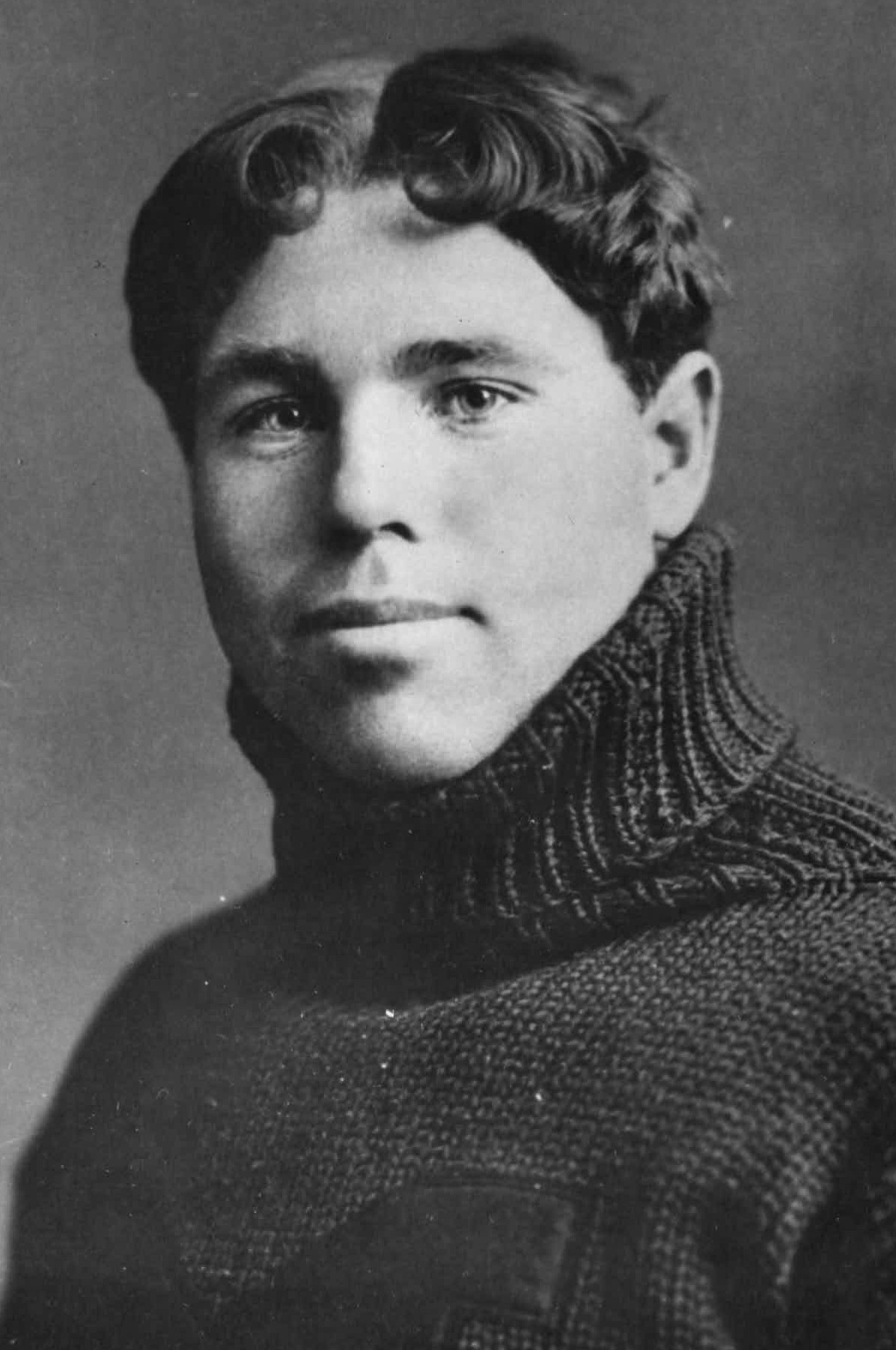
Yost brought halfback Willie Heston with him from California in 1901.

Michigan opened the 1901 season with a 50–0 win against Albion, a team that won the Michigan Intercollegiate Athletic Association championship in 1900. The game was played in 20-minute halves at Regents Field in Ann Arbor on September 28. Michigan scored nine touchdowns (worth five points each in 1901), including three by Hugh White, two by Walter W. Shaw, and one each by Neil Snow, Willie Heston, Bruce Shorts, and Everett Sweeley. Shaw also kicked three goals from touchdown with Herb Graver and Sweeley adding one each. Heston appeared in his first game for the Wolverines as a substitute for Shaw at left halfback. In its account of the game, The Michigan Alumnus described Heston as a "stocky Californian" who "proved a whirlwind in bucking the line." Heston's first touchdown as a Wolverine came on a defensive take-away described as follows: "Once when Albion had the ball on her 25-yard line, Heston broke through between guard and center, got possession of the ball before it left the quarter back's hands, and made a touchdown." Joe Maddock was the only Albion player to gain ground; he transferred to Michigan in 1902.

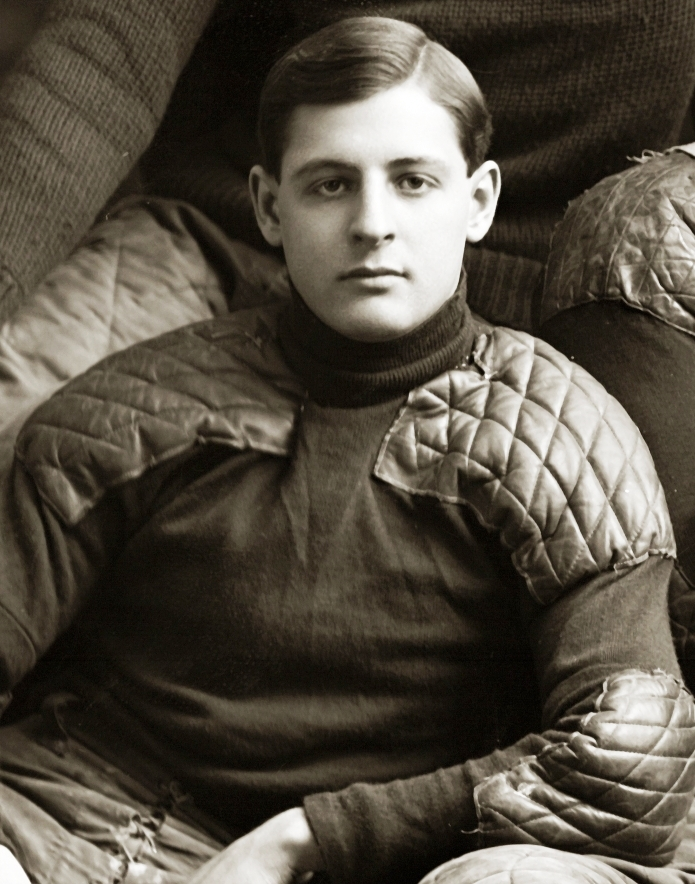
Walter W. Shaw was the starting halfback for the first two games in 1901.

Michigan starting lineup was Curtis Redden (left end), Hugh White (left tackle), Dan McGugin (left guard), George W. Gregory (center), Ebin Wilson (right guard), Bruce Shorts (right tackle), James Knight (right end), Boss Weeks (quarterback), Walter Shaw (left halfback), Everett Sweeley (right halfback), and Neil Snow (fullback).

=== Week 2: Case ===
On October 5, Michigan played its second game of the season against Case Scientific School from Cleveland, Ohio. In a short game of 20-minute halves, Michigan won by a score of 57–0. Heston scored four touchdowns, Sweeley and Snow added two each, and single touchdowns were scored by White and Woodward. Goals after touchdown were scored by Shaw (4), Graver (2) and Sweeley (1). Heston and Sweeley were singled out for praise in the account of the game published in The Michigan Alumnus:

"Two men, Sweeley and Heston, constantly won the plaudits of the rooters by their long gains around the ends. Sweeley is fleet, and he kept his feet in a way that reminded the wise ones of McLean's remarkable performances. Heston proved himself the ground gainer that he has given evidence of being during the daily practices."

In its coverage of the game, the Alumnus also noted that Michigan's new coach Yost "refuses to have a man on the field who [is] 'yellow' or who is not willing to work and to take his fair share of knocks." The Alumnus concluded: "If Michigan has a winning team, it will be because some of the enthusiasm of her coach has been transferred to the men."

Michigan's starting lineup was Curtis Redden (left end), Hugh White (left tackle), Dan McGugin (left guard), George Gregory (center), Ebin Wilson (right guard), Daniel Woodward (right tackle), James Knight (right end), Boss Weeks (quarterback), Everett Sweeley (left halfback), Walter Shaw (right halfback), and Neil Snow (fullback).

=== Week 3: Indiana ===
Indiana at Michigan

Team	1	2	Total
Indiana	0	0	0
• Michigan	23	10	33

- Date: October 12
- Location: Regents Field • Ann Arbor, MI

On October 12, Michigan defeated Indiana, 33–0, at Regents Field in a game of 25- and 20-minute halves. The game was played on a field that had undergone steady rain for 24 hours and had been reduced to "a sea of mud." The field conditions kept Michigan from getting its "fast play into correct motion". Nevertheless, Michigan allowed Indiana a first down only once and was only once forced to punt. Aside from the field conditions, Michigan's scoring was slowed by three fumbles and eight holding and offsides penalties. The highlight of the game was a 75-yard punt return by Boss Weeks. Michigan scored six touchdowns, including two each by Bruce Shorts and Willie Heston and single touchdowns by Neil Snow and Walter W. Shaw. Shorts added three goals from touchdown.

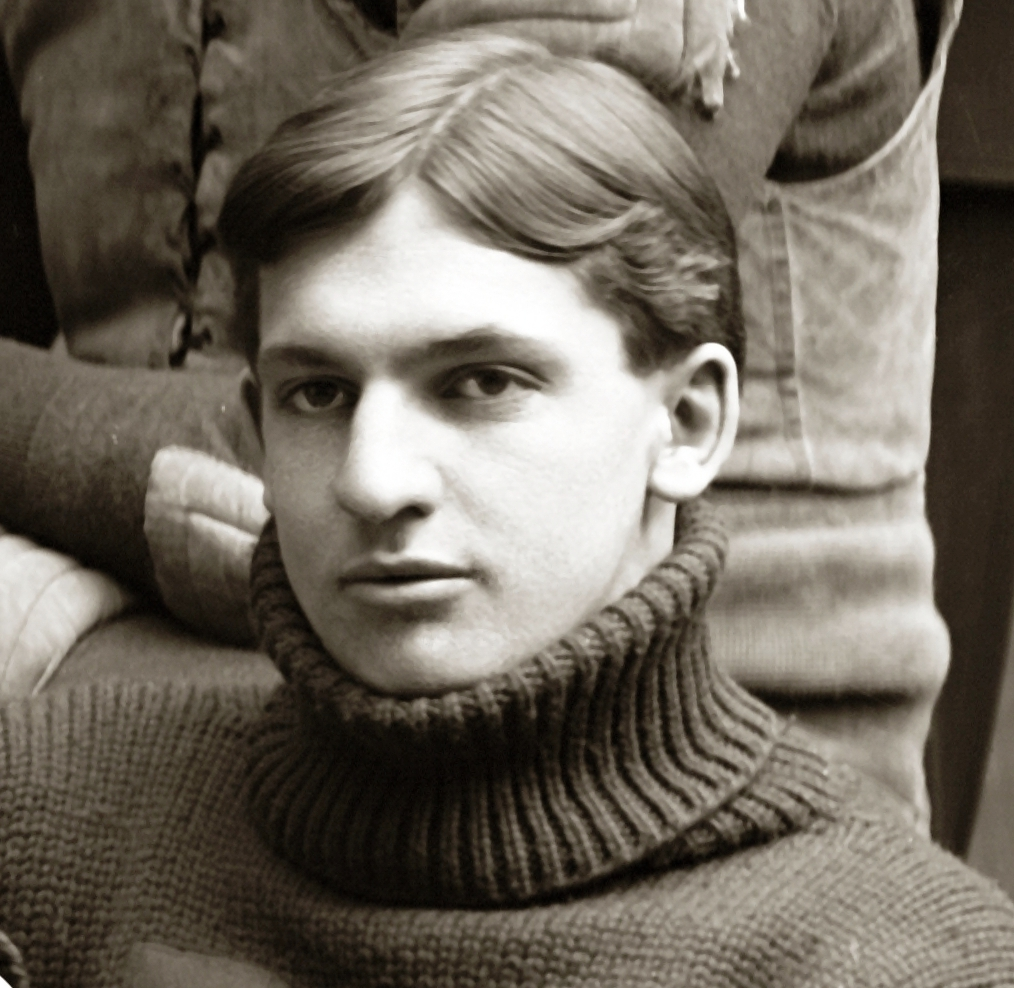
Quarterback Boss Weeks

Following the win over Indiana, the student newspaper, The Wolverine noted: "The 'Varsity showing was most satisfactory. Against a heavier team, on a slippery field which was all in favor of the visitors and directly opposed to our style of play, the 'Varsity was not found wanting and turned victory into a fight for big scores. Even the most optimistic did not look for such a large score, with the elements against us. The smiling, yet earnest face of Coach Yost has become a favorite feature at the games. His success as a coach has already been demonstrated, and every Michigan man is proud of him as an athlete, as a coach and as a man."

Michigan's starting lineup was Curtis Redden (left end), Hugh White (left tackle), Dan McGugin (left guard), George Gregory (center), Ebin Wilson (right guard), Bruce Shorts (right tackle), Albert Herrnstein (right end), Boss Weeks (quarterback), Willie Heston (left halfback), Everett Sweeley (right halfback), and Neil Snow (fullback).

=== Week 4: Northwestern ===
Northwestern at Michigan

Team	1	2	Total
Northwestern	0	0	0
• Michigan	12	17	29

- Date: October 19
- Location: Regents Field • Ann Arbor, MI
- Game attendance: 3,000
- Referee: Bob Wrenn

On October 19, Michigan defeated Northwestern by a score of 29–0 at Regents Field in front of a crowd of 3,000 persons. The victory was considered particularly important as Northwestern had been considered "a strong aspirant for western championship honors". In a game of two 25-minute halves, Heston scored three touchdowns and had runs of 55 and 45 yards. Left halfback Willie Heston scored three touchdowns, with Neil Snow and Walter Shaw scoring one each. Bruce Shorts added four goals from touchdown.

Northwestern's longest gain was six yards. The only threat to Michigan's goal came in the second half when Willie Heston fielded a kickoff and tossed to Everett Sweeley. Northwestern took over at the ten-yard line and moved it by the "tandem play" to the two-yard line. Yost later recalled the impressive play of his team in preventing Northwestern to score: "The defense at this point was as good as I have ever seen. Northwestern could not advance a foot. When the ball was held for downs and Michigan had again obtained possession, our goal line had passed its only danger of the season." The Pittsburgh Press described the game as follows: "Just to show her superiority during the last few minutes of play, Michigan, put in an all substitute line. The Michigan defence was impregnable and her offensive work grand."

Michigan's starters in the game were Curtis Redden (left end), Hugh White (left tackle), Dan McGugin (left guard), George Gregory (center), Ebin Wilson (right guard), Bruce Shorts (right tackle), Albert Herrnstein (right end), Boss Weeks (quarterback), Willie Heston (left halfback), Everett Sweeley (right halfback), and Neil Snow (fullback).

=== Week 5: Buffalo ===
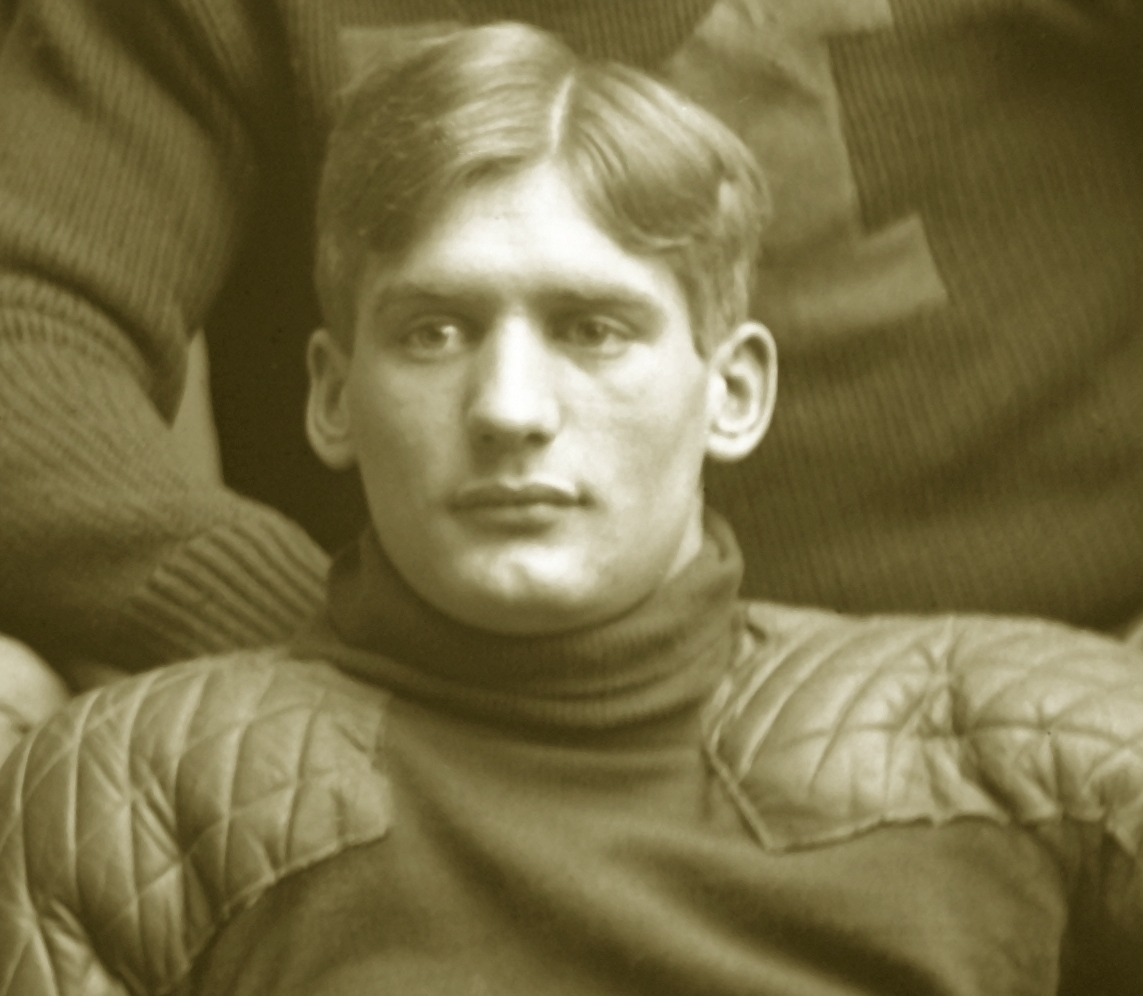
Albert Herrnstein scored five touchdowns against Buffalo and six touchdowns against Beloit, and he later coached the Ohio State football team.

On October 26, Michigan defeated the University of Buffalo by a score of 128–0 at Ann Arbor. Michigan scored 22 touchdowns in the game, five by Albert Herrnstein, four each by Neil Snow and Arthur Redner, three each by Willie Heston and Everett Sweeley, two by Curtis Redden, and one by Bruce Shorts. Shorts also had 18 goals for touchdown. The game was scheduled to be played in 30-minute halves, but Buffalo's coach asked at halftime that the second half be reduced to 20 minutes, and so the game was limited to 50 minutes of playing time. The Detroit Free Press noted that Michigan scored more points against Buffalo than it had during the entire 1900 season, averaging more than two points per minute played and a touchdown every two minutes.

A newspaper account reported that "the most spectacular" play of the game came on a 90-yard touchdown run by Herrnstein. The New York Times reported that the Wolverines' margin of victory was the third largest in the history of the sport:

"[T]he score of to-day's game was one of the most remarkable ever made in the history of football in the important colleges. Only two scores are recorded in American where a victory was won in more decided style. These occasions were when Stevens Institute beat the College of the City of New York by 162 to 0 at Hoboken, N.J., in 1885, and when Harvard beat Exeter by 158 to 0 at Exeter, Mass., in 1886."

After the game, Buffalo's Coach Gordon said Michigan was "one of the most wonderful teams he ever saw," and added, "Michigan can defeat any team in the East." Buffalo had defeated the team from Columbia University, one of the stronger teams in the east, by a score of 5–0 earlier in the season. The 1901 Columbia team defeated Eastern "Big Four" power Penn, 11–0, and narrowly lost a game to Yale, 10–5. Several newspapers used the Buffalo game as a point of reference in assessing the strength of Michigan's 1901 team. The Pittsburgh Press reported that Michigan's big victory over a "fairly strong" Buffalo team "shows that Michigan has a remarkable team." The Daily Review from Decatur, Illinois, observed: "Considering the fact that Buffalo trimmed Columbia rather easily, making a larger score against the college than did Harvard or Yale, there seems some justice in" Coach Brown's comments that Michigan could defeat Harvard, Yale or Princeton. The Adrian Daily Telegram opined: "Michigan defeated Buffalo 128 to 0, which clearly demonstrates that she can bump the big eastern four without much fear of disaster."

In 1916, Coach Yost shared his recollections of the Buffalo game with Big Bill Edwards: "Buffalo University came to Michigan with a much-heralded team. They were coached by a Dartmouth man and had not been scored upon. Buffalo papers referred to Michigan as the Woolly Westerners, and the Buffalo enthusiasts placed bets that Michigan would not score." The score at the end of the first half was 65 to 0. About fifteen minutes after the second half had started, Yost discovered a Buffalo player, Simpson, "on Michigan's side of the field, covered up in a blanket." Yost was curious and asked, "Simpson, what are you doing over here? You are on the wrong side." To which, Simpson replied, "Don't say anything. I know where I am at. The coach has put me in three times already and I'm not going in there again. Enough is enough for any one. I've had mine."

=== Week 6: Carlisle ===
Carlisle at Michigan

Team	1	2	Total
Carlisle	0	0	0
• Michigan	16	6	22

- Date: November 2
- Location: Bennett Park, Detroit, MI
- Game attendance: 8,000

The Wolverines defeated Pop Warner's Carlisle Indian team, 22–0, in a game played at Bennett Park in Detroit on November 2. The game drew a crowd of 8,000 spectators, "[t]he largest crowd that ever turned out to a football game in Michigan." Bruce Shorts led the scoring with 12 points on a touchdown, a field goal, and two goals from touchdown. Ebin Wilson and Willie Heston also scored touchdowns.

Carlisle in 1901 also played several of the major Eastern teams, losing a close game to Penn (14–16), and also losing to Cornell (0–17) and Harvard (0–29). Accordingly, the Michigan-Carlisle game triggered a debate as to whether Michigan's football team was as strong as Harvard and the other leading teams of the East. Carlisle played the Michigan game without its star tackle, Martin Wheelock, who was injured one week earlier against Harvard. Michigan, too, played without a key player, Curtis Redden. After the game, Pop Warner, who had predicted a victory before the game, asserted that his team was depleted by injuries and opined that Michigan was not as strong as Harvard. Following Warner's claim, the Detroit Free Press published a position-by-position analysis purporting to show that Warner used his best team against Michigan.

The New York Times pointed to the Carlisle game as evidence that Michigan's remarkable season was not limited to small institutions. Coach Yost later wrote that he believed Michigan would have won by an even larger score if Redden had not been injured. Michigan's convincing win over Carlisle, and its wins over Buffalo and Chicago, led the Times to conclude that a game between Michigan and one of the "Big Four" teams of the East "would be a conflict well worth seeing and productive of interesting and possibly startling results."

Michigan's starters in the game were Curtis Redden (left end), Hugh White (left tackle), Dan McGugin (left guard), George Gregory (center), Ebin Wilson (right guard), Bruce Shorts (right tackle), Albert Herrnstein (right end), Boss Weeks (quarterback), Willie Heston (left halfback), Everett Sweeley (right halfback), and Neil Snow (fullback).

=== Week 7: Ohio State ===
Michigan at Ohio State

Team	1	2	Total
• Michigan	16	5	21
Ohio State	0	0	0

- Date: November 9
- Location: Ohio Field, Columbus, OH
- Game attendance: 4,000
- Referee: Bob Wrenn

On November 9, 1901, undefeated Michigan faced an undefeated Ohio State team that had allowed opponents to score only five points in its five previous games. The 1901 game was the third meeting in what would become the Michigan–Ohio State football rivalry, with the two teams having played to a scoreless tie in their prior match in 1900.

Michigan won the 1901 game, 21–0, at Ohio Field in Columbus, Ohio, in front of a crowd of approximately 4,000 persons. A special train carried 375 Michigan students to the game on the Ann Arbor and Hocking Valley railroads. Ohio State held the Wolverines to their lowest point total of the 1901 season. Prior to the game, the head coaches argued over the length of the game, Yost insisting on regulation halves of 30 minute and Ohio State's John B. Eckstorm insisting that the first half be limited to 25 minutes. When the umpire threatened Ohio State with a forfeiture, coach Eckstrom agreed to play regulation halves of 30 minutes.

Michigan scored three touchdowns in the first half. Left tackle Hugh White scored the first touchdown on a two-yard run with Bruce Shorts kicking the goal from touchdown to give Michigan a 6–0 lead. Michigan's second touchdown was scored by left halfback Willie Heston on a 40-yard run. Fullback Neil Snow scored the third touchdown of the first half and also scored the only touchdown of the second half.

The Detroit Free Press noted that Ohio State's players sought to slow the pace of Michigan's "hurry up" style of play. The paper noted: "On almost every scrimmage some Ohio man would stretch out on the ground and take his full time. This playing for wind was so apparent that the Michigan players finally burlesqued it. The Ohio men could not stand the gaff, and their doctors and trainer ran more yards than both teams put together." After the game, coach Yost commented on Ohio State's tactic: "Their laying down for time took much of the vim out of our team, and rested their tired out players."

Michigan's starters in the game were Curtis Redden (left end), Hugh White (left tackle), Dan McGugin (left guard), George Gregory (center), Ebin Wilson (right guard), Bruce Shorts (right tackle), Albert Herrnstein (right end), Boss Weeks (quarterback), Willie Heston (left halfback), Everett Sweeley (right halfback), and Neil Snow (fullback).

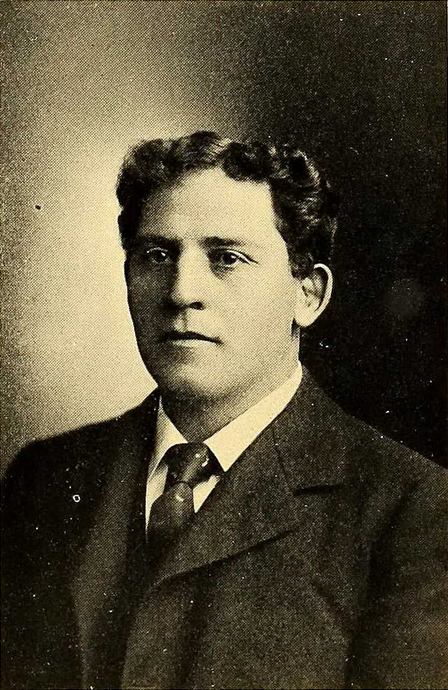
Chicago coach Amos Alonzo Stagg in 1899

=== Week 8: Chicago ===
Chicago at Michigan

Team	1	2	Total
Chicago	0	0	0
• Michigan	11	11	22

- Date: November 16
- Location: Regents Field, Ann Arbor, MI
- Referee: Fred Hayner (Lake Forest)

On November 16, 1901, Michigan faced its traditional rival in Amos Alonzo Stagg's University of Chicago Maroons football team. Chicago had won three of the prior four matches, including a 15–6 victory over Michigan in 1900. Coach Yost noted, "I knew long before I came to Michigan of the great rivalry existing between this University and the University of Chicago. It was my desire to win this game above all others."

The 1901 game was played in 35-minute halves at Regents Field in front of one of the largest crowds that ever attended a game up to that time in Ann Arbor. Michigan won the game, 22–0. Michigan's first touchdown was scored by fullback Neil Snow with Bruce Shorts kicking for the goal after touchdown. The second touchdown was scored at the 9-minute mark in the first half by left tackle Hugh White on a "mass play" on Chicago's left end. Shorts missed the kick for goal from touchdown. In the second half, Shorts scored Michigan's third touchdown after 5:45 had been played in the second half but missed the kick for goal as Michigan extended its lead to 16–0. White scored Michigan's fourth touchdown and Shorts kicked goal at the 7:30 mark of the second half. Michigan's defense held Chicago to three first downs, never allowed the Maroons into field goal range, and forced 11 punts while the Wolverines punted only once.

Despite the win, Coach Yost was disappointed with the low point total accumulated by his team and publicly stated that "we would have scored many more points on Chicago if the field had been dry." Yost described the impact of the weather on his team as follows: "Much to our disappointment the game was played on a muddy field in a snowstorm, and the work of our backs was seriously handicapped. The Chicago team was not to the same extent handicapped by reason of the fact that it did not rely upon speed to advance the ball. . . . End-running was impossible, and we were compelled to make our gains by line-bucking which is a slow process . . ."

Michigan's starters in the game were Curtis Redden (left end), Hugh White (left tackle), Dan McGugin (left guard), George Gregory (center), Ebin Wilson (right guard), Bruce Shorts (right tackle), Albert Herrnstein (right end), Boss Weeks (quarterback), Willie Heston (left halfback), Everett Sweeley (right halfback), and Neil Snow (fullback).

=== Week 9: Beloit ===
Beloit at Michigan

Team	1	2	Total
Beloit	0	0	0
• Michigan	35	54	89

- Date: November 23
- Location: Regents Field • Ann Arbor, MI
- Referee: Hayner (Lake Forest)

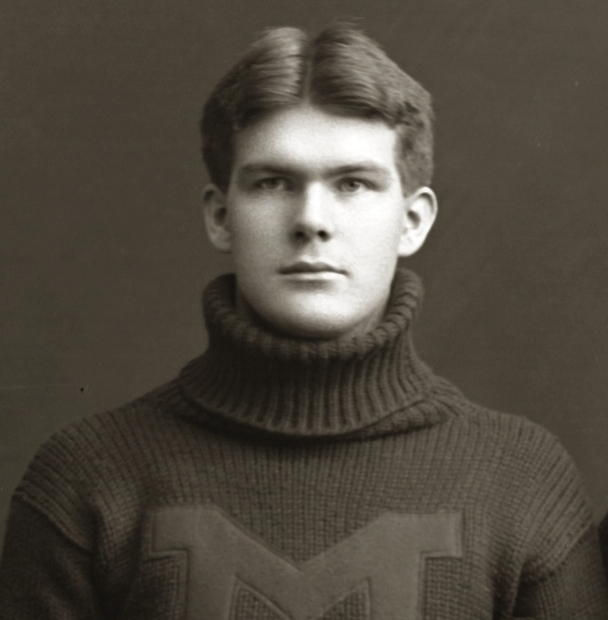
Right tackle Bruce Shorts scored 23 points against Buffalo, 19 points against Beloit and 25 points against Iowa.

Michigan played its final home game on November 23 and won, 89–0, over Beloit College. The game was played in 30-minute halves at Regents Field in Ann Arbor. Michigan scored 15 touchdowns, six by Albert Herrnstein, three by Neil Snow, and single touchdowns by Shorts, Heston, White, Graver, Sweeley and Redner. Shorts also scored on 14 goals from touchdown, giving him 19 points. The game was played on a wet field that was "practically a pond in the centre, filled in with sawdust before the game started." Because of the field conditions, Michigan was not able to execute its end runs and relied principally on "line bucking." Right end Albert Herrnstein scored six touchdowns for 30 points, including two kickoff returns for touchdowns in the second half. Coach Yost later recalled the scene on the field after one of Herrnstein's runs: "Once when Herrnstein made a long run for a touchdown I remember of seeing four Beloit players stretched on the ground in a line where they had made useless efforts to stop him." Right tackle Bruce Shorts scored a touchdown and kicked 14 extra points for 19 points. Fullback Neil Snow added three touchdowns for 15 points, and single touchdowns were scored by Heston, White, Graver, Sweeley and Redden. The Beloit team managed to gain the five yards required for a first down on only one drive late in the game. Beloit's one first down came on a fake kick followed by a run of 15 yards—the largest gain made by any team against Michigan in 1901. The New York Times reported: "The strong team from Beloit was unable to do anything against the Ann Arbor men."

Michigan's starters in the game were Curtis Redden (left end), Hugh White (left tackle), Dan McGugin (left guard), George Gregory (center), Ebin Wilson (right guard), Bruce Shorts (right tackle), Albert Herrnstein (right end), Boss Weeks (quarterback), Willie Heston (left halfback), Everett Sweeley (right halfback), and Neil Snow (fullback).

=== Week 10: Iowa ===
Iowa vs. Michigan

Team	1	2	Total
Iowa	0	0	0
• Michigan	22	28	50

- Date: November 28
- Location: West Side Park • Chicago, IL
- Game attendance: 10,000

Michigan closed its regular season schedule on Thanksgiving Day, November 28, with a 50–0 win over the University of Iowa in front of a crowd of 10,000 spectators at West Side Park in Chicago. The New York Times reported that "Michigan scored almost at will" and "outclassed" a "sturdy, plucky" Iowa team. Willie Heston and Bruce Shorts scored four touchdowns each for Michigan and "played a spectacular part for the Wolverines." Shorts added five successful extra point kicks giving him 25 points in the game. Neil Snow also scored a touchdown for Michigan.

Michigan's starters in the game were Herb Graver (left end), Hugh White (left tackle), Dan McGugin (left guard), George Gregory (center), Ebin Wilson (right guard), Bruce Shorts (right tackle), Albert Herrnstein (right end), Boss Weeks (quarterback), Willie Heston (left halfback), Everett Sweeley (right halfback), and Neil Snow (fullback).

== Postseason ==
=== Rose Bowl ===
Rose Bowl

Team	1	2	Total
• Michigan	17	32	49
Stanford	0	0	0

- Date: January 1, 1902
- Location: Tournament Park • Pasadena, CA
- Game start: 2:30 p.m.
- Game attendance: 8,500

After the conclusion of the 1901 football season, Michigan, was invited to play against Stanford in the first Rose Bowl Game in Pasadena, California. Michigan won the game on New Year's Day 1902 by the score of 49–0. Neil Snow scored five touchdowns.

The players that traveled to California were starters, Hugh White, Curtis Redden, Dan McGugin, George Gregory, Bruce Shorts, Albert Herrnstein, Boss Weeks, Everett Sweeley, Willie Heston, and Neil Snow, and substitutes Arthur Redner (back), Benjamin Harrison Southworth (guard), James E. Forrest (tackle), and Paul J. Jones (back).

=== "Point-a-Minute" teams ===
The 1901 Michigan team was the first of Yost's "Point-a-Minute" teams, so named for their high scoring offense. From 1901 to 1905, Yost's Michigan teams compiled a record of 55–1–1 and outscored their opponents by a combined score of 2,821 to 42.

After the first four games, a Boston newspaper noted that Michigan "has scored an average of one point for every minute of play." The race to continue the point per minute scoring remained a topic of reportage for the remainder of the season. After six games, the Wolverines had scored 319 points in 280 minutes. At the end of the regular season, Michigan had fallen slightly short of the point-a-minute mark with 501 points in 540 minutes.

=== Accolades ===
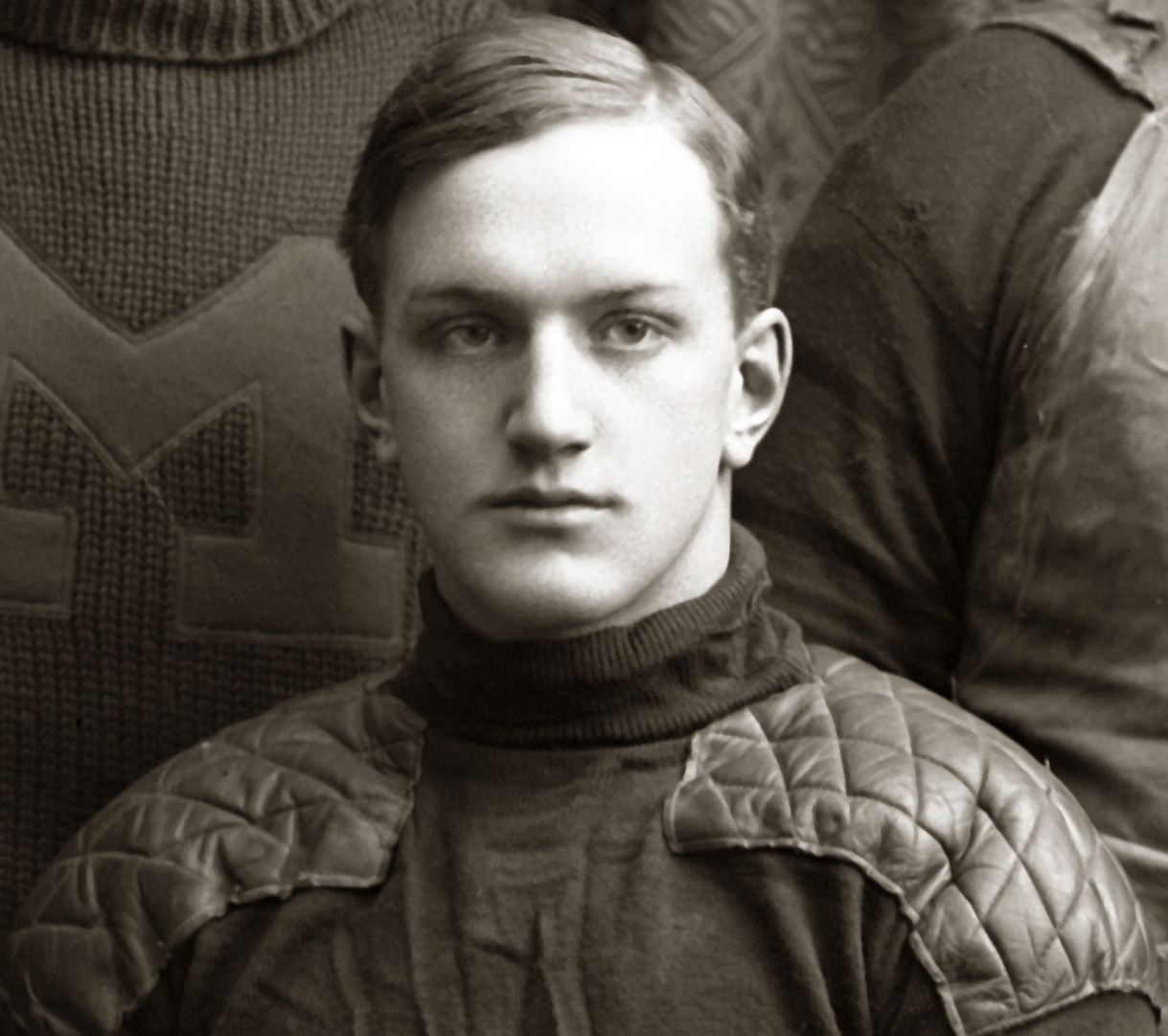
All-American Neil Snow scored five touchdowns in the 1902 Rose Bowl.

At the conclusion of the 1901 season, team captain Hugh White gave head coach Fielding Yost and trainer Keene Fitzpatrick substantial credit for the performance of the 1901 team. He credited the coach with "inoculating into the men some of Mr. Yost's own spirit, impulsiveness and optimism," and with having the "faculty of adapting his plays to the material at hand so that he got the best there was out of every one of the eleven men." With respect to the trainer, White noted:

"An equally strong element, and one many are apt to overlook, was the work of Keene Fitzpatrick. Consider a team training nearly four months, without a man going stale, and but one injured so that he had to be taken out of the game! Then in addition a trip of nearly 3000 miles, from a climate where the thermometer registered 10 degrees below zero, into one of summer weather, and eleven men playing through an entire game and finishing it with faster and stronger play than at the beginning! Such were the results achieved by our trainer. ... Too much praise cannot be given him."

For its impressive average of 50 points per game on offense and eleven games of scoreless defense, the 1901 team has been recognized as one of the greatest college football teams of all time.

Snow was selected as an All-American by Caspar Whitney for Outing magazine, and four Wolverines were selected for the All-Western team: Snow (fullback/end), Heston (halfback), Boss Weeks (quarterback), and Bruce Shorts (right tackle).

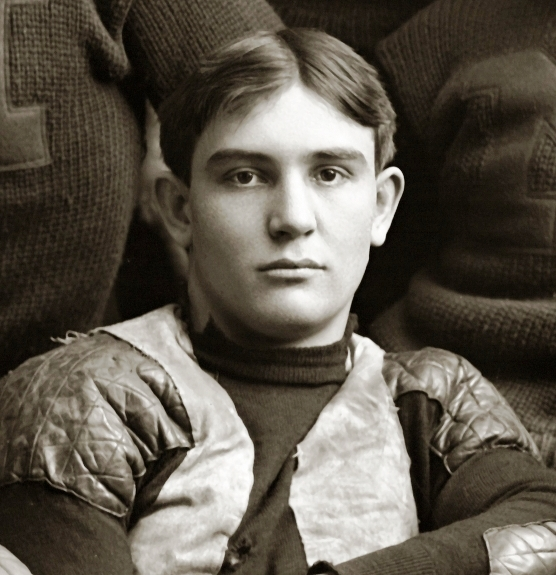
Everett Sweeley from Iowa was considered one of the best punters in the country in 1901.

At the end of the 1901 season, team captain Hugh White wrote: "The fall of 1901 will go down in the history of Michigan athletics, not only as the most successful football season the University has ever had, but also as establishing the most wonderful and unique record in the history of the game." A summary of the accomplishments of the 1901 Michigan team written by Yost was published in the 1902 University of Michigan yearbook under the title "Yost's Soliloquy," originally printed in a Detroit newspaper. The accomplishments of the 1901 team, wrote Yost, included "the highest number of points ever rolled up in a season by a recognized team." The punting of Everett Sweeley was also an important element in Michigan's success in 1901. Sweeley was regarded by Yost as "the best punter in the country." Ten men, all but the center, carried the ball in turns. Yost highlighted that Michigan ran 219 plays in the Iowa game, compared to 149 run by Harvard in the Harvard–Yale game of 1901. The fast pace of Michigan's play on offense earned Yost the nickname "Hurry Up." Yost described the 1901 team as a speedy group "composed of muscular, wiry men who had no superfluous weight."

Michigan's line was strong on defense. The fullback was called upon to make a tackle only once in the entire season. In the final three games of the season, Michigan's defense allowed only seven first downs. Four of Michigan's opponents (Albion, Case, Beloit, and Indiana) never had possession of the ball in Michigan's territory. Only Northwestern and Buffalo moved the ball inside Michigan's 30-yard line, and those two instances came on penalties against Michigan for forward passes. Only one player was taken out of a game for injury, and he returned to practice the Monday after the Saturday game. (Note: The injury was to Curtis Redden during the Carlisle game, and, according to Yost, Redden "was ready and anxious to play ten minutes after the injury.")

== Personnel ==
=== Varsity letter winners ===
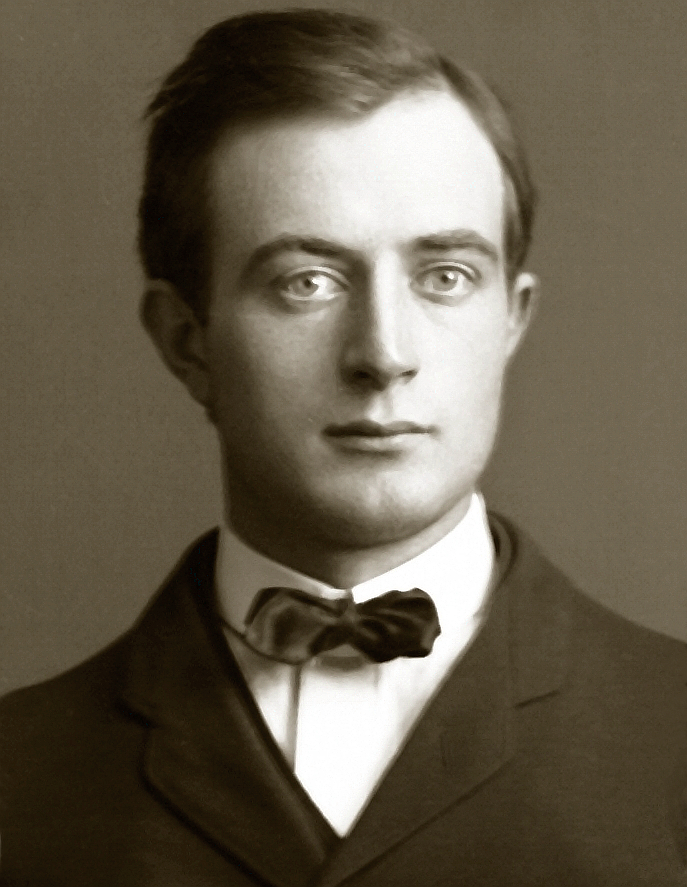
Left guard Dan McGugin married Coach Yost's wife's sister and became a Hall of Fame coach at Vanderbilt.

The following 13 players received varsity "M" letters for their participation on the 1901 football team:

==== Line ====
Player	Position	Games started	Hometown	Height	Weight	Class	Prior experience
Herbert S. Graver	End	1	Chicago, Illinois	5' 9"	157	Eng '04	Englewood H.S.
George W. Gregory	Center	11	Redding, California	6' 1/2"	188	Law '04	Shasta H.S.
Albert E. Herrnstein	End, halfback	9	Chillicothe, Ohio	5' 11"	168	Lit. '03	Sub
Dan McGugin	Guard	10	Tingley, Iowa	5' 11"	175	Law '04	Drake University
Curtis Redden	End	10	Rossville, Illinois	6' 3/4"	166	Law '03	Varsity (1 yr)
Bruce Shorts	Tackle	10	Mt. Pleasant, Michigan	6' 1"	190	Law '01 (P.G.)	Varsity (1 yr)
Hugh White	Tackle	11	Lapeer, Michigan	5' 11"	180	Law '02	Varsity (3 yrs)
Ebin Wilson	Guard	11	Merrill, Michigan	5' 6"	185	Law '02	Sub

==== Backfield ====
Player	Position	Games started	Hometown	Height	Weight	Class	Prior experience
Willie Heston	Halfback	8	Grants Pass, Oregon	5' 10"	175	Law '04	San Jose Normal
Arthur Redner	Halfback	0	Bessemer, Michigan	5' 9"	156	Eng. '04	Varsity (1 yr)
Neil Snow	Fullback	11	Detroit, Michigan	6' 2"	185	Lit. '02	Varsity (3 yrs)
Everett Sweeley	End, halfback	11	Sioux City, Iowa	6' 1/4"	167	Lit. '03	Varsity (2 yrs)
Boss Weeks	Quarterback	11	Allegan, Michigan	5' 7"	150	Law '02	Varsity (1 yr)

=== Varsity substitutes ===
Player	Position	Games started	Hometown	Height	Weight	Class	Prior Experience
Edward W. "John" Dickey	Center	0	Weiser, Idaho			Law '02.	
James E. Forest	Guard	1	Ann Arbor, Michigan	6'4"	200		
Benjamin H. Southworth	Line	0	Reading, Michigan	5'9"	187	Med '03.	
Walter W. Shaw	Halfback	2	Kansas City, Missouri	5'9"	156	Law '02	
Paul J. Jones	Fullback	0	Youngstown, Ohio				
James C. Knight	End	2	Norway, Michigan	5'11"	165	Law '03	Princeton
Daniel Wallace Woodward (Note: Born September 25, 1878, in Allen's Grove, Wisconsin; died July 3, 1904, in Delavan Lake, Wisconsin.)	Tackle	1	Clinton, Wisconsin				

=== Reserves ===
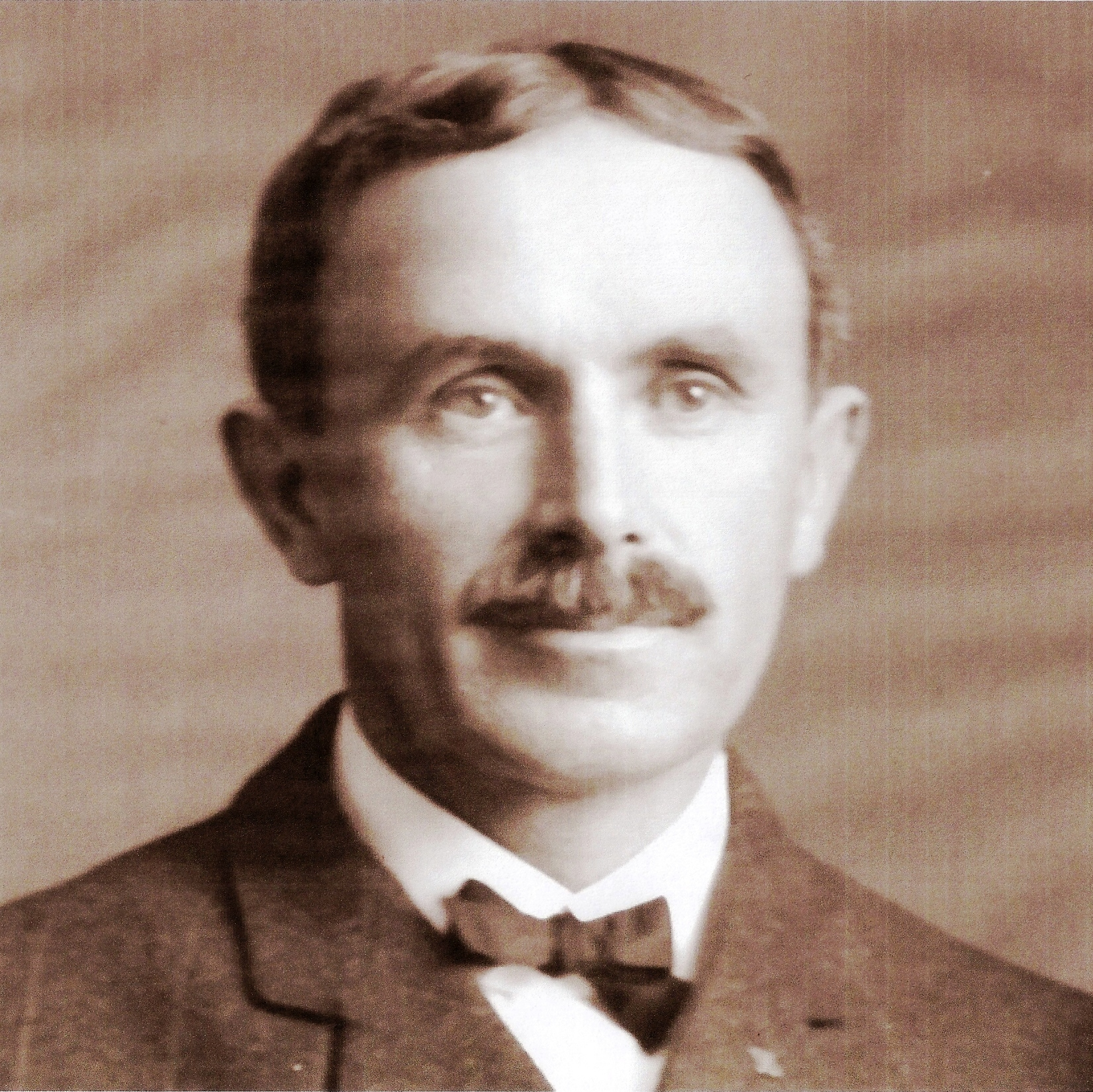
Trainer Keene Fitzpatrick kept the team fit training in below zero weather and traveling to the Rose Bowl.

Player	Position	Hometown	Height	Weight	Class	Prior Experience
Albert Preussman (Note: "Preussman, the quarterback, has been the whole life of the reserve team. He runs the plays off fast and handles the ball well.")	Quarterback	Chicago, Illinois		158		
Arthur G. Urquhart	Halfback	Ironwood, Michigan		167		
John F. Hincks	Halfback	Manistee, Michigan		167		
Andrew G. Reid	Fullback	Indianola, Iowa		158	Law	Simpson College
David L. Dunlap	End	Hopkinton, Iowa			Med '05	
Norman Sterry	Line	Los Angeles, California			Law '03	
Cecil Gooding	Center	Ann Arbor, Michigan		192	Eng. '05	Ann Arbor High School
David E. Beardsley	End	Kalamazoo, Michigan			Lit '02	
William Edward Snushall	Guard	Traverse City, Michigan			Eng. '03	
George Mark Davidson	Halfback	Wichita, Kansas			Eng. '03	
Joseph C. Horgan	Guard, tackle	Victor, Colorado		175	Law '03	
Moses Johnson	Tackle	Wichita, Kansas			Lit '05	
Samuel J. Sackett	Halfback	Ann Arbor, Michigan			Law '03	
Harold Baker	Guard	Rochester, New York		185	Homeop '05	Rochester, N.Y. Military Academy
Claude C. Frazer	End	Flint, Michigan			Law '02	

=== Coaching staff ===
- Head coach: Fielding H. Yost
- Assistant coach: Bennie Owen
- Trainer: Keene Fitzpatrick
- Manager: Harry K. Crafts, Class of 1902 (Law) (Note: Harry Kent Crafts was the son of Clayton Crafts, the speaker of the Illinois House of Representatives. He attended Northwestern University law school after graduating from Michigan in 1901. He became a lawyer in Chicago. He was married to Verna Louise Harris, June 18, 1903, at Ann Arbor. He was employed for 20 years as the assistant general counsel for Armour & Company. He died December 16, 1939.)
- Manager-elect: Joseph H. Ferguson, Class of 1903 (Lit.)

=== Scoring leaders ===
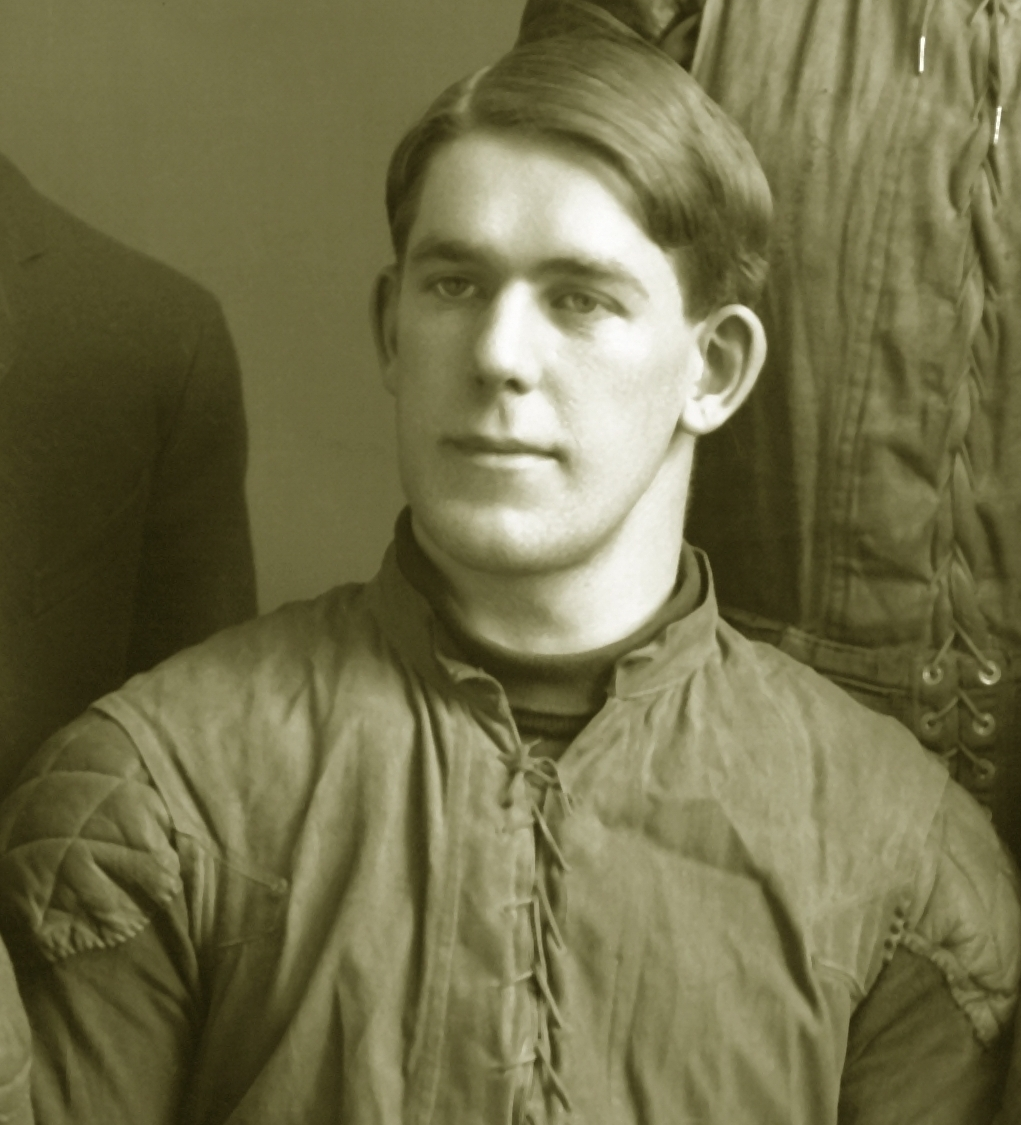
Herb Graver

Player	Touchdowns (5 points)	Extra points	Field goals (5 points)	Total
Bruce Shorts	13	53	1	123
Willie Heston	20	0	0	100
Neil Snow	19	0	0	95
Albert Herrnstein	12	0	0	60
Everett Sweeley	7	2	1	42
Hugh White	6	0	0	30
Walter Shaw	4	7	0	27
Arthur Redner	5	0	0	25
Curtis Redden	4	0	0	20
Herb Graver	1	3	0	8
