= Herb Graver =

American football player, coach, and businessman (1880–1954)

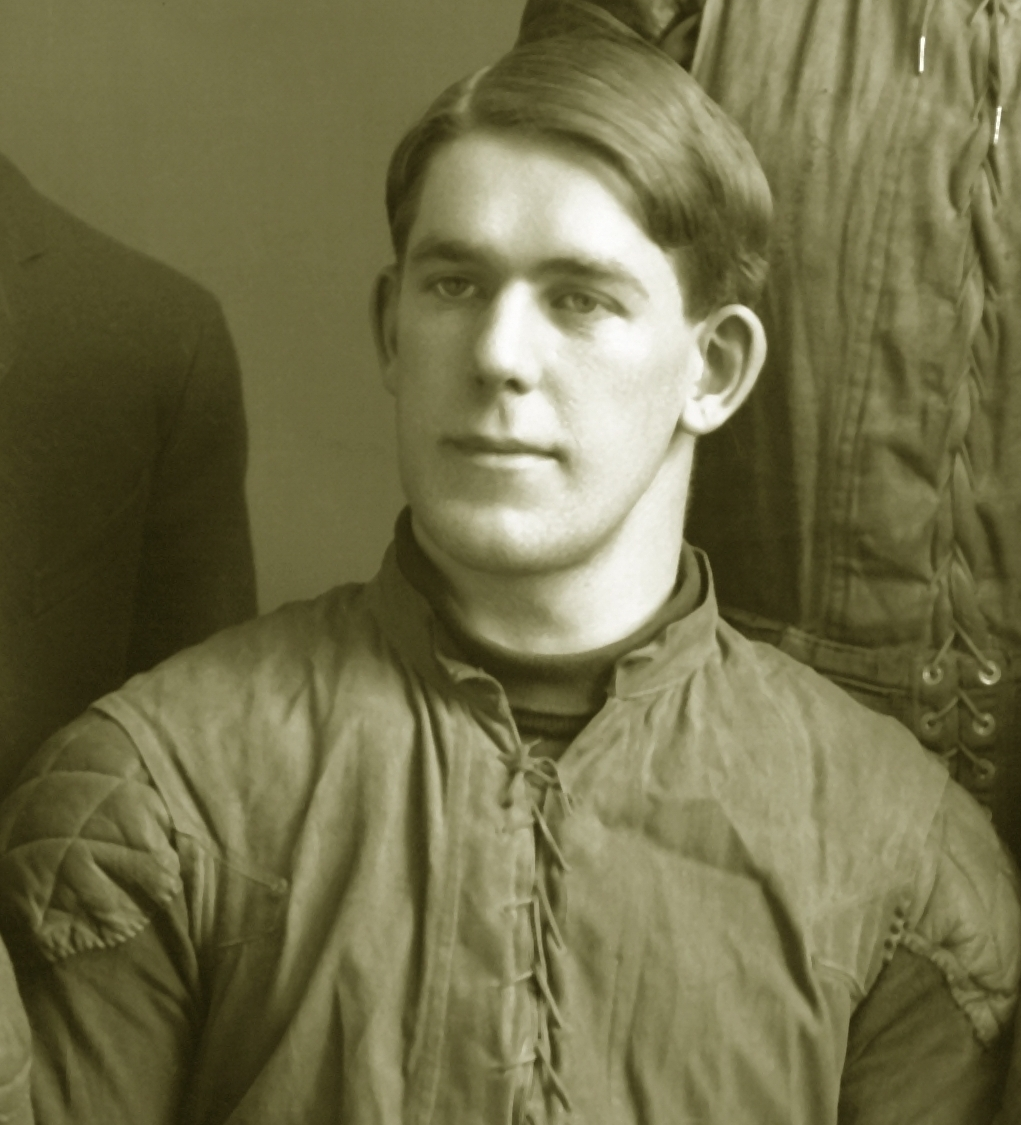
- Graver, from the 1903 Michigan Wolverines team photograph

Biographical details
- Born: August 29, 1880; Pittsburgh, Pennsylvania, U.S.
- Died: August 6, 1954 (aged 73); Chicago, Illinois, U.S.

Playing career
- 1901–1903: Michigan
- Positions: End, halfback, fullback, quarterback

Coaching career (HC unless noted)
- 1904: Marietta

Head coaching record
- Overall: 4–3–1

Accomplishments and honors

Championships
- 3× National (1901, 1902, 1903)

Awards
- Third-team All-American (1903)

Herbert Spencer Graver Sr. (August 29, 1880 – August 6, 1954) was an American football player, coach, and businessman. He played at the end, halfback, fullback, and quarterback positions for Fielding H. Yost's renowned 1901, 1902 and 1903 "Point-a-Minute" football teams. He scored five touchdowns against Ohio State in 1903, which remains the single-game record for the most touchdowns scored by a player for either team in the history of the Michigan–Ohio State football rivalry. In 1904, Graver was the head coach of the Marietta College football team. He worked for the Graver Tank Company from 1904 to 1954.

== Biography ==
=== Early years ===
Graver was born in Pittsburgh, Pennsylvania in 1880. He was the son of William Graver (1842–1915) and Christina Graver, who moved in 1884 to Chicago. In 1888, his father founded the Graver Tank Works in East Chicago, Indiana. The company was the first industry established in East Chicago, Indiana, and got its start manufacturing tanks for a Standard Oil Company refinery. The company was also a pioneer in the manufacture of large steel tanks for grain elevators, oil and gas storage.

Graver was raised in Chicago, and attended Englewood High School, where he played two years of high school football and helped lead Englewood to a football championship in 1899. At the time of the 1900 United States census, Graver was living in Chicago with his parents, four brothers (James, William, Philip and Alexander), and two servants.

=== Michigan ===
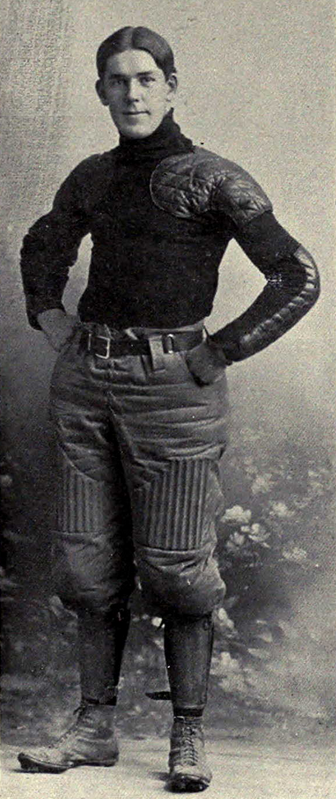
Graver from 1903 Michiganensian

He enrolled at the University of Michigan in 1900 and played on Michigan's varsity football teams in 1901, 1902 and 1903. During Graver's three years as a varsity football player, the Michigan Wolverines did not lose a game, compiling a three-year record of 33–0–1 and outscoring opponents 1,759 to 18. Graver was one of the lighter men on Michigan's football teams at 163 pounds, but it was said that he made up for his small size with aggressive playing. Coach Yost praised Graver for his open field play, identifying him as one of his dangerous men for opponents to let loose in the open field.

On November 7, 1903, Graver scored five rushing touchdowns against Ohio State, tying him with Albert E. Herrnstein for the single-season record for most touchdowns scored by a player for either team in the history of the Michigan – Ohio State football rivalry. According to a newspaper account of the game, "Yost's 'point a minute machine'" showed terrific speed in scoring 36 points in the first half, and "Graver ran Ohio's ends at will and in the open field it seemed impossible to tackle him." Graver scored a total of 15 touchdowns for the 1903 season, one more than College Football Hall of Fame inductee Willie Heston.

Graver also won favor with Yost for his versatility, playing at halfback, fullback, quarterback, and end during the 1902 season. Injuries required Yost to fill holes at the fullback and quarterback positions, and Graver was the player he called on. In response to a newspaper inquiry as to how Graver was adapting to being moved to a new position, Yost replied, "How did he do? That boy does well any place you put him. He is little, but I rather guess if I stuck him in at guard he would hustle anyone in the country to keep him from doing things." At the end of the 1902 season, Graver was selected as an All-Western substitute for positions behind the line. The Chicago Tribune in 1902 called Graver "the best man on defense" on the Michigan team.

At the end of the 1903 season, he was selected by Walter Camp for Collier's Weekly as a halfback on his third All-American team.

Graver was an engineering student at Michigan and was elected as president of the engineering department's Class of 1904. He was also a member of the Theta Delta Chi fraternity at Michigan. He was also chosen to serve as a member of Michigan's Athletic Board of Control for the 1903–1904 academic year.

=== Marietta College ===
Graver graduated from the University of Michigan in 1904 and began work for the Graver Tank Works in East Chicago, Indiana during the summer of 1904. In the fall of 1904, he was hired as the head football coach at Marietta College in Marietta, Ohio. Graver compiled a record of 4–3–1 in his one season as head football coach at Marietta.

=== Later years ===
At the end of the football season, he returned to work at the Graver Tank Works. The company, founded by his father, was one of the largest manufacturers and erectors of steel tanks in the world.

At the time of the 1910 United States census, Graver was living with his parents in Chicago. His occupation was identified at the time as a civil engineer for tank works. His father was listed as a tank builder at the tank works, and his younger brother, Alexander, was identified as a mechanical engineer for the tank works.

In September 1910, Graver married Anna Thorne. The Suburbanite Economist reported: "The wedding will be a home affair, and the young couple will leave immediately for a month's trip through northern Canada and to the northwest. Upon their return, they will be at home at 140 70th Street."

The company later became known as the Graver Tank and Manufacturing Company, and Herb Graver was its sales manager.

In 1922, Graver built an English manor style home at 10616 Longwood Drive in Chicago. The three-story brick structure had eleven rooms, four baths, two powder rooms, and covered and open terraces. The home was designed by John Todd Hetherington, is currently used as the headquarters of the Ridge Historical Society, and is listed in the AIA Guide to Chicago as one of the city's architecturally significant structures.

At the time of the 1930 United States census, Graver was living at the Longwood Drive home with his wife Anna, son Herbert, and a servant.

In a draft registration card completed by Graver at the time of World War II, he indicated that he lived at 10428 South Seeley Avenue in Chicago and worked for the Graver Tank & Mfg. Co., Inc. He was married to Anna T. Graver.

Graver died in August 1954 at age 74. He suffered a heart attack at the International Amphitheatre where he was watching wrestling matches. Graver was survived by his wife, Anna Thorne Graver, and a son, Herbert S. Graver Jr.
