= Benjamin H. Southworth =

American football player, physician, and surgeon (1878–1924)

Profile
- Positions: Guard, Center

Personal information
- Born: November 1, 1878; Hillsdale County, Michigan, U.S.
- Died: January 3, 1924 (aged 45); Schoolcraft, Michigan, U.S.
- Listed height: 5 ft 9 in (1.75 m)
- Listed weight: 187 lb (85 kg)

Career information
- College: Michigan

Career history
- 1900–1901: Michigan

Awards and highlights
- National champion (1901)

Benjamin Harrison Southworth (November 1, 1878 – January 3, 1924) was an American football player, physician and surgeon. He was a member of the University of Michigan's 1901 "Point-a-Minute" football team that finished the season 11–0, outscored opponents 550 to 0, and won the first college football bowl game, the 1902 Rose Bowl. Southworth was one of 15 players who traveled from Ann Arbor to play in the first Rose Bowl game.

== Early life ==
Southworth was born in 1878 on a farm in Reading Township, Hillsdale County, Michigan. At the time of the 1880 United States census, he was living on the family farm in Reading with his parents, J.L. and Emily Southworth, and three older brothers, H.E., H.D. and J.B.

== University of Michigan ==
Southworth enrolled as a medical student at the University of Michigan in 1899 and played college football on the 1900 and 1901 Michigan Wolverines football teams. He was a member of the famed 1901 "Point-a-Minute" team that finished the season 11–0 and outscored opponents 550 to 0. He appeared as a substitute in three games during the 1901 season—at center in the Albion game, left tackle in the Buffalo game, and left guard in the Beloit game. He was one of 15 players whose expenses were paid by Pasadena Tournament of Roses Association, allowing Michigan to field a team in the 1902 Rose Bowl, which Michigan won by score of 49 to 0. A profile of the 1901 team noted, "Southworth, the big guard, is a junior medic. He has the weight, and with an increase of speed will develop into a 'Varsity player."

== Medical career and family ==
Southworth later attended Rush Medical College in Chicago, graduating in 1903. He became a medical doctor in Kalamazoo, Michigan. At the time of the 1910 United States census, Southworth was living in Schoolcraft, Michigan with his wife Kathryn. In a draft registration card at the time of World War I, Southworth indicated that he was a physician and surgeon in Schoolcraft. At the time of the 1920 United States census, he was living in Schoolcraft Township with his wife. Southworth and his wife had four children, Maynard (1906–1968), Benjamin (1908–1967), Marion (1912–2008) and Genevieve (1920–2013). Southworth died from diabetes mellitus in January 1924.

His son, Maynard N. Southworth, attended medical school at the University of Michigan and was a member of the varsity wrestling and baseball teams in the late 1920s.
