= Arthur Redner =

American football player and coach (1879–1973)

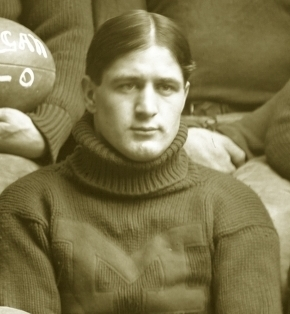

Profile
- Position: Halfback

Personal information
- Born: November 24, 1879; Philadelphia, Pennsylvania, U.S.
- Died: November 17, 1973 (aged 93); Park Ridge, Illinois, U.S.

Career information
- College: Michigan, 1900–1901

Awards and highlights
- National champion (1901)

Arthur E. Redner (November 24, 1879 – November 17, 1973) was an American football player and coach. He played halfback for the University of Michigan in 1900 and 1901 and was the last surviving member of Fielding H. Yost's renowned 1901 "Point-a-Minute" football team.

== Early life ==
Redner was born in Philadelphia, Pennsylvania in November 1879. His father, August Redner, emigrated from Germany in 1872 and worked as a barber. Redner also had a younger sister, Agnes. In approximately 1885, the family moved to Bessemer in Michigan's Upper Peninsula. His father operated a barber shop in Bessemer. Redner attended both A.D. Johnston High School in Bessemer and Luther L. Wright High School in Ironwood, Michigan. He played football at both schools.

== University of Michigan ==
Redner enrolled at the University of Michigan in 1900 and played at the halfback position for the Michigan football teams of 1900 and 1901. On November 17, 1900, he scored Michigan's only touchdown in a 7–0 win over Notre Dame. In 1901, he played for Fielding H. Yost's famous "Point-a-Minute" team that won a national championship and outscored its opponents by a combined score of 550 to 0. At the end of the 1901 season the Michigan Daily-News wrote: "He is very quick and good at bucking or skirting the end. He is faithful in his work and deserves his place among the 'M' men."

== Mining and coaching career ==
In 1902, Redner transferred to the Michigan College of Mines and Technology (later known as Michigan Technological University) in Houghton, Michigan. After graduating from Michigan Tech in 1904, Redner spent two years in the west. He returned to the Upper Peninsula in 1908, taking an engineering position with the Oliver Iron Mining Co. in Ironwood, Michigan. Redner later became a football coach and mine superintendent in the Gogebic Range. He was the mine superintendent for the Corrigan-McKinley Steel Co. in Bessemer.

In a draft registration card at the time of World War I, Redner indicated that he was living in Anvil, Michigan, and working for the Newport Mining Co.

In 1910, Redner began coaching the Ironwood High School football team. In 1921, he was coach of the Bessemer city football team.

== Later life ==
Redner married the former Belle Olson in 1911. The couple lived in Bessemer until 1934, when Redner retired. They moved to Detroit, where Redner served on the board of directors of Grand View Hospital. During World War II, Redner returned to the workforce as an engineer for the Vickers Corp. in Detroit. He retired again in 1955 and moved with his wife to Calumet, Michigan.

In 1954, he was selected as one of the 20 charter members of the Gogebic Range Hall of Fame as published in the Ironwood Daily Globe. In 1968, the couple moved to Northbrook, Illinois, to be near their daughter Ellen Probst. Redner's wife died in 1971. In November 1973, Redner died at age 93 at Lutheran General Hospital in Park Ridge, Illinois. He was the last surviving member of the 1901 "Point-a-Minute" team. Redner was survived by a son, R. David Redner, and a daughter, Ellen Probst. His son, Arthur Redner, Jr., died in 1926.
