= Walter W. Shaw =

American lawyer

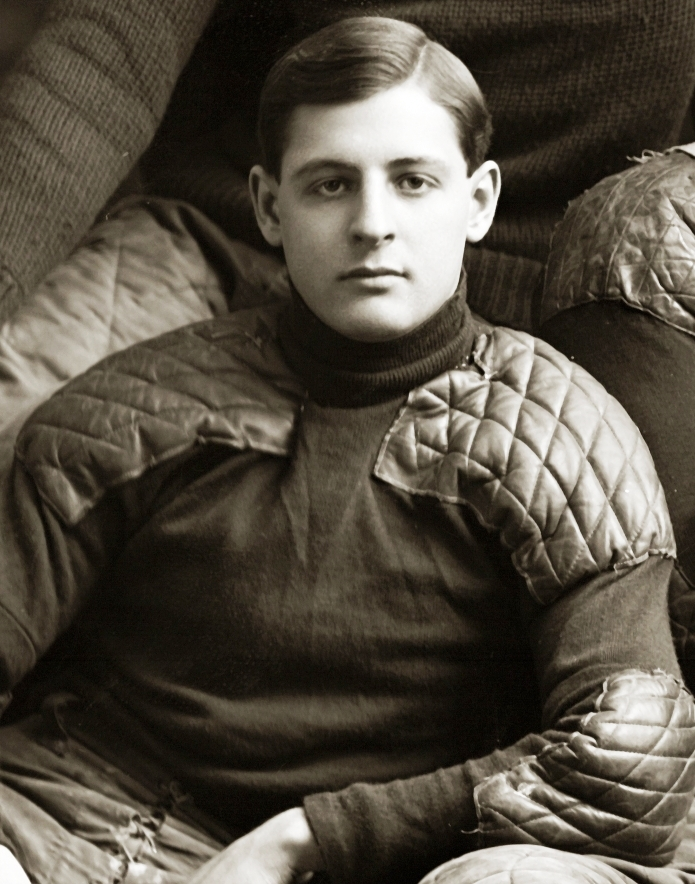
- Shaw, from 1900 Michigan team photograph

Biographical details
- Born: November 21, 1880; Owego, New York, U.S.
- Died: September 30, 1949 (aged 68)

Playing career
- 1899–1901: Michigan
- Positions: Halfback, quarterback

Accomplishments and honors

Championships
- National (1901)

Walter White Shaw (November 21, 1880 – September 30, 1949) was an American football player and coach, attorney and businessman. He played at the halfback position for Fielding H. Yost's renowned 1901 "Point-a-Minute" football team. He later worked as an attorney, judge and businessman in Oklahoma and Louisiana.

Shaw was born in Owego, New York in 1880, the son of Charles E. and Ida M. (White) Shaw. His father gained prominence as a buckwheat miller, wholesale grocer, coal mine operator and banker. In 1889, the Shaw family moved to Lincoln, Nebraska where they remained for eight years. In 1897, the family moved to Denver, Colorado. The younger Shaw was educated in the schools of Lincoln, Denver, and Kansas City, Missouri. He enrolled at the University of Michigan where he was a member of the law school's Class of 1902. He played for the Michigan Wolverines football team as a quarterback and halfback from 1899 to 1901. He began the 1901 season as a starting halfback for Michigan in the team's first year under head coach Fielding H. Yost. In the third and fourth games of the 1901 season against Indiana and Northwestern, Willie Heston got the start at left halfback, and Shaw substituted for Heston late in the games. Shaw did not appear in any games for Michigan after the Northwestern game. According to a newspaper account at the end of the 1901 season, he was "kept out of the game most of the year by an injured knee."

In the fall of 1902, Shaw began practicing law in Kansas City. He moved to Claremore, Oklahoma in 1904. Shaw practiced law in Claremore for eleven years. He also served as Claremore city attorney and was elected as a Rogers County judge in November 1912. In 1915, he moved to Shreveport, Louisiana, where he entered the bond business and also secured interests in oil. In 1918, Shaw moved to Tulsa, Oklahoma, where he became the manager of the bond department of the Exchange Trust Company and Exchange National Bank.

Shaw married Mary A. Bullette in June 1906. His wife was the daughter of Bullette, who was elected the Cherokee National Council in 1876. They had two children, Walter W. Shaw, Jr. (born in 1907) and Martha Helen Shaw (born in 1908).

Shaw was also active in the Masons, was a 32nd degree Mason, and a member of Akdar Temple of the Mystic Shrine.
