= Ebin Wilson =

American football player and coach (1869–1948)

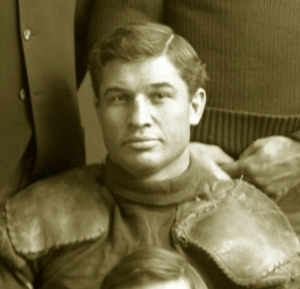
- Wilson cropped from 1901 Michigan team photograph

Biographical details
- Born: August 1869; Michigan, U.S.
- Died: December 18, 1948 (aged 79); Saginaw, Michigan, U.S.

Playing career
- 1898: Michigan State Normal
- 1899–1901: Michigan
- Positions: Center, guard

Coaching career (HC unless noted)
- 1902–1903: Wabash
- 1904–1905: Alma

Head coaching record
- Overall: 20–14–2

Ebin "Tug" Wilson (August 1869 – December 18, 1948), sometimes spelled Eben Wilson, was an American college football player and coach. He was a starter on the 1901 Michigan Wolverines football team that outscored its opponents 550–0 and later coached football at Wabash College and Alma College.

== Early life and playing career ==
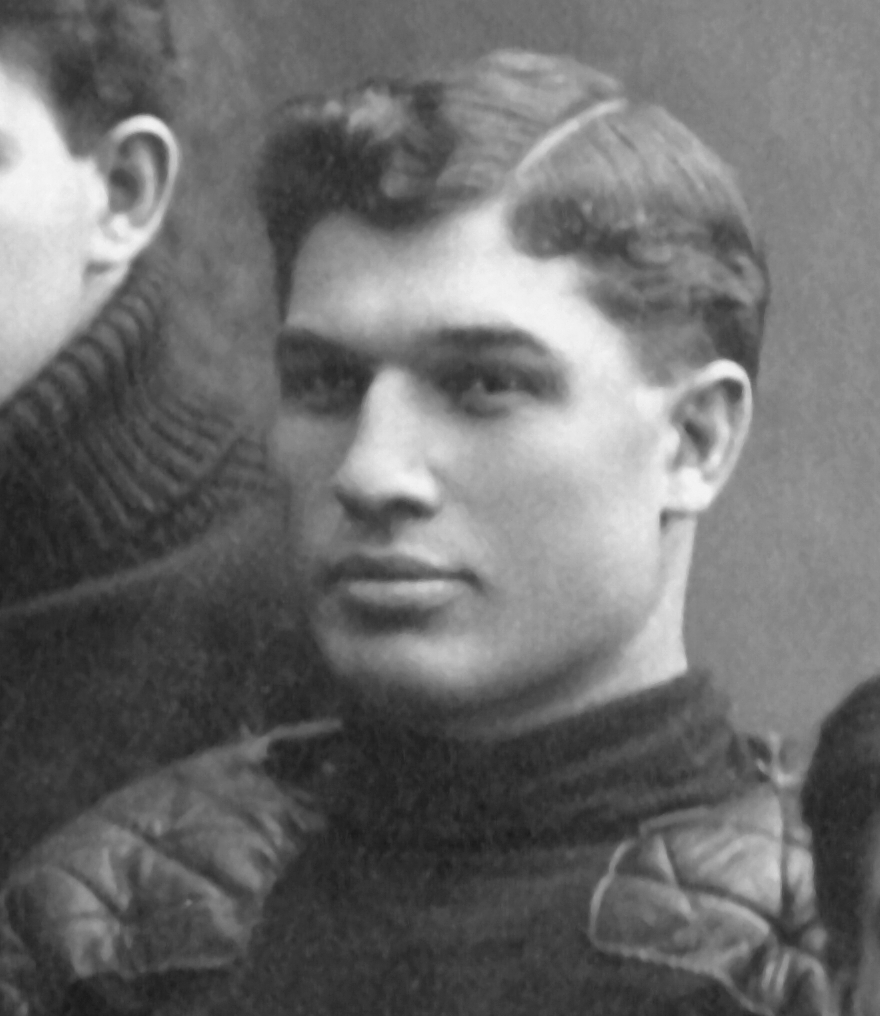
Wilson in 1899

Wilson was born in August 1869. He grew up in Merrill, Michigan and began his college football career playing for Michigan State Normal College—now known as Eastern Michigan University–at Ypsilanti, Michigan. During his senior year in 1898, Wilson was captain of Normal's football team.

After graduating from the State Normal school, Wilson enrolled at the University of Michigan as a law student. He played for the University of Michigan football team as a reserve in 1899 and as the starting center in 1900. He was the starting right guard on the 1901 Michigan Wolverines football team that won the national championship and outscored its opponents by a combined score of 550 to 0. After the 1901 season, the Michigan Daily-News wrote of Wilson: "He has a great many qualities which combine to make a good guard, but there is one that stands out above all the rest and that is -- strength." He was also the University of Michigan's champion heavyweight wrestler and an expert boxer. At the end of the 1901 season, Wilson was selected as an All-Western player by Rhinehart.

== Coaching career ==
After playing in the 1902 Rose Bowl and graduating from Michigan, Wilson became the 15th head football coach at Wabash College in Crawfordsville, Indiana. When the hiring of Wilson was announced, the college newspaper at Wabash reported:

Wabash college students believe that they have this year a coach who will do more toward strengthening the team and promoting interests of football in general than has been done in many years in the past. Coach Wilson is the man in whom we place this confidence. Through many years of experience on college elevens, he has certainly gained no mean knowledge of the find points of the game and what is more he has the ability of imparting this knowledge to the players. He states that in drilling the team he expects to follow closely the tactics which he learned in Michigan under Coach Fielding H. Yost, and, in addition, to teach some new plays of his own invention which he is sure are winners.

After Wilson took over as coach in the fall of 1902, the Wabash team compiled a 2–4–2 record that season. In 1903, Wilson led the team to a record of 9–3, including shutout victories over Indiana (5–0), Butler (46–0), Hanover (51–0), and DePauw (10–0), and an 87–5 win over Franklin. The 1903 Wabash team outscored its opponents by a combined score of 274 to 74. In the final game of the 1903 season, Wabash was beaten by Notre Dame, 34–0.

Wilson became the football coach at Alma College in 1904. In addition to coaching football, Wilson was the school's physical director and instructor of physical training for men.

== Family and death ==
Wilson was married to Grace Coy in 1897. At the time of the 1900 United States census, Wilson and his wife lived in Columbia Township in The Thumb region of Michigan. He worked at a planing mill. In 1910, Wilson remained in Columbia with his wife. By that time, they had a son, Wayne M. Wilson. Wilson's occupation in 1910 was listed as a farmer. At the time of the 1930 United States census, Wilson was still living in Columbia and working as a farmer. His son, Wayne M. Wilson, was living with him and working as a fireman for the Michigan Central Railroad.

In 1940, Wilson was living in Saginaw, Michigan, and working as a watchman.

Wilson died in 1948 at the Saginaw County Infirmary. He was 78 years old at the time of his death.

== Head coaching record ==
Year	Team	Overall	Conference	Standing	Bowl/playoffs
Wabash (Independent) (1902–1903)
1902	Wabash	2–4–2			
1903	Wabash	9–3			
Wabash:		11–7–2			
Alma Maroon and Cream (Michigan Intercollegiate Athletic Association) (1904–1905)
1904	Alma	4–3			
1905	Alma	5–4	1–4	5th	
Alma:		9–7			
Total:		20–14–2			
