= Andrew G. Reid =

American lawyer

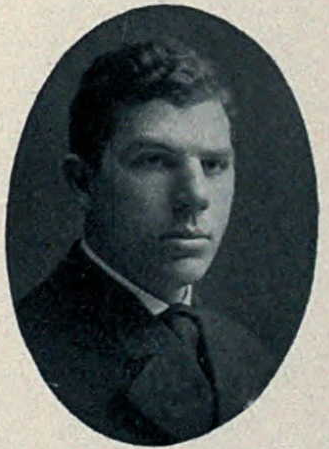

Biographical details
- Born: May 24, 1878; Warren County, Illinois, U.S.
- Died: July 6, 1941 (aged 63); Waterloo, Iowa, U.S.

Playing career

Football
- 1901: Michigan
- Position: Fullback

Coaching career (HC unless noted)

Football
- 1902–1905: Simpson (IA)
- 1907–1909: Monmouth (IL)

Baseball
- 1902–1905: Simpson (IA)
- 1909–1910: Monmouth (IL)

Head coaching record
- Overall: 18–27–1 (football); 22–48–1 (baseball)

Andrew Graham Reid (May 24, 1878 – July 6, 1941) was an American college football player, coach, and official, athletics administrator, professor of mathematics, businessman, and lawyer. He played football for the University of Michigan's 1901 "Point-a-Minute" team. He was the head football coach and athletic director at Monmouth College in Illinois from 1907 to 1909. He also served as a football official in Big Ten Conference football games.

== Early years and playing career ==
Reid was born in Warren County, Illinois in 1878. He grew up in Iowa and attended the public schools there before enrolling at Simpson College in Indianola, Iowa. He received Ph.B. degree there in 1901.

=== Michigan ===
After graduating from Simpson, Reid enrolled in the law department at the University of Michigan. While attending Michigan, he was a "star athlete." During his first year of law school, Reid played football for the 1901 Michigan Wolverines football team. At five feet, eight inches, and 158 pounds, Reid was a reserve on the 1901 team. He appeared as a substitute fullback in Michigan's 50–0 victory over Albion and the team's 33–0 victory over Indiana. In its "Football Year-Book," The Michigan Daily-News said of Reid, "He has developed rapidly in the fullback position." The 1901 Michigan team was the first of Fielding H. Yost's "Point-a-Minute" teams. The team compiled a record of 11–0 and outscored its opponents 550 to 0.

Reid was also a member of the varsity track team, competing in the hammer throw, during his first year at Michigan. In May 1902, The Michigan Alumnus noted: "Reid, the sub-fullback on the Varsity, has been showing up remarkably well with the hammer, and the first of this week, threw it 126 feet, within less than four feet of the Intercollegiate record." Reid received his law degree from Michigan in 1906.

== Coaching career ==
=== Simpson ===
Reid coached at Simpson College in Indianola, Iowa from 1902 to 1905.

=== Monmouth ===
After graduating from Michigan, Reid became an assistant professor of mathematics at Monmouth College in Illinois. In 1907, he was also hired by Monmouth College as its athletic director and coach. He stayed at Monmouth for three years, resigning in 1910. In Monmouth College's 1911 yearbook, Reid was remembered as follows

Coming to take charge of the work in the spring of 1907 when the prospects were none too bright, he has developed and trained teams for the last three years that are a credit to him and to the school, and through them his hard work and excellent coaching is clearly shown. In his coaching and training he has not only given especial attention to each individual and to keeping the entire team in the best possible condition, but also has always insisted on team work so that his teams have all worked together like well lubricated machines. Too much cannot be said of Reid's ability as a coach and trainer of athletes.

In three seasons as the head football coach at Monmouth, he compiled a record of 8–10–1.

== Later years ==
In 1910, Reid moved to Waterloo, Iowa, where he lived and practiced law for 30 years. He married Helen Sedgwick (1889–1974) on June 7, 1915. In a draft registration card completed in September 1918, Reid indicated that he was a self-employed lawyer. He was living with his wife, Helen S. Reid, at 324 South Street in Waterloo. At the time of the 1930 United States census, Reid and his wife, Helen S. Reid, were living in Waterloo with their four children, Martha (age 13), Wallace (age 10), Joseph (age 8) and Mary (age 6). Reid was employed as an attorney. He was a member of the Knights of Pythias and the Benevolent Protective Order of Elks.

In addition to his private law practice, Reid served as Waterloo's city attorney and a member of the school board. He was also the president of the Black Hawk County Abstract Company.

Reid also officiated Big Ten Conference football games in his later years. In 1940, he was inducted as an honorary member of the University of Iowa's "I" club.

In July 1941, Reid died from a sudden heart attack at his home in Waterloo.

== Head coaching record ==
=== Football ===
Year	Team	Overall	Conference	Standing	Bowl/playoffs
Simpson Red and Gold (Independent) (1902–1905)
1902	Simpson	5–3			
1903	Simpson	1–4			
1904	Simpson	1–5			
1905	Simpson	3–5			
Simpson:		10–17			
Monmouth Fighting Scots (Independent) (1907–1909)
1907	Monmouth	4–1–1			
1908	Monmouth	2–4			
1909	Monmouth	2–5			
Monmouth:		8–10–1			
Total:		18–27–1			
