= 1908 Ohio State Buckeyes football team =

American college football season

1908 Ohio State Buckeyes football
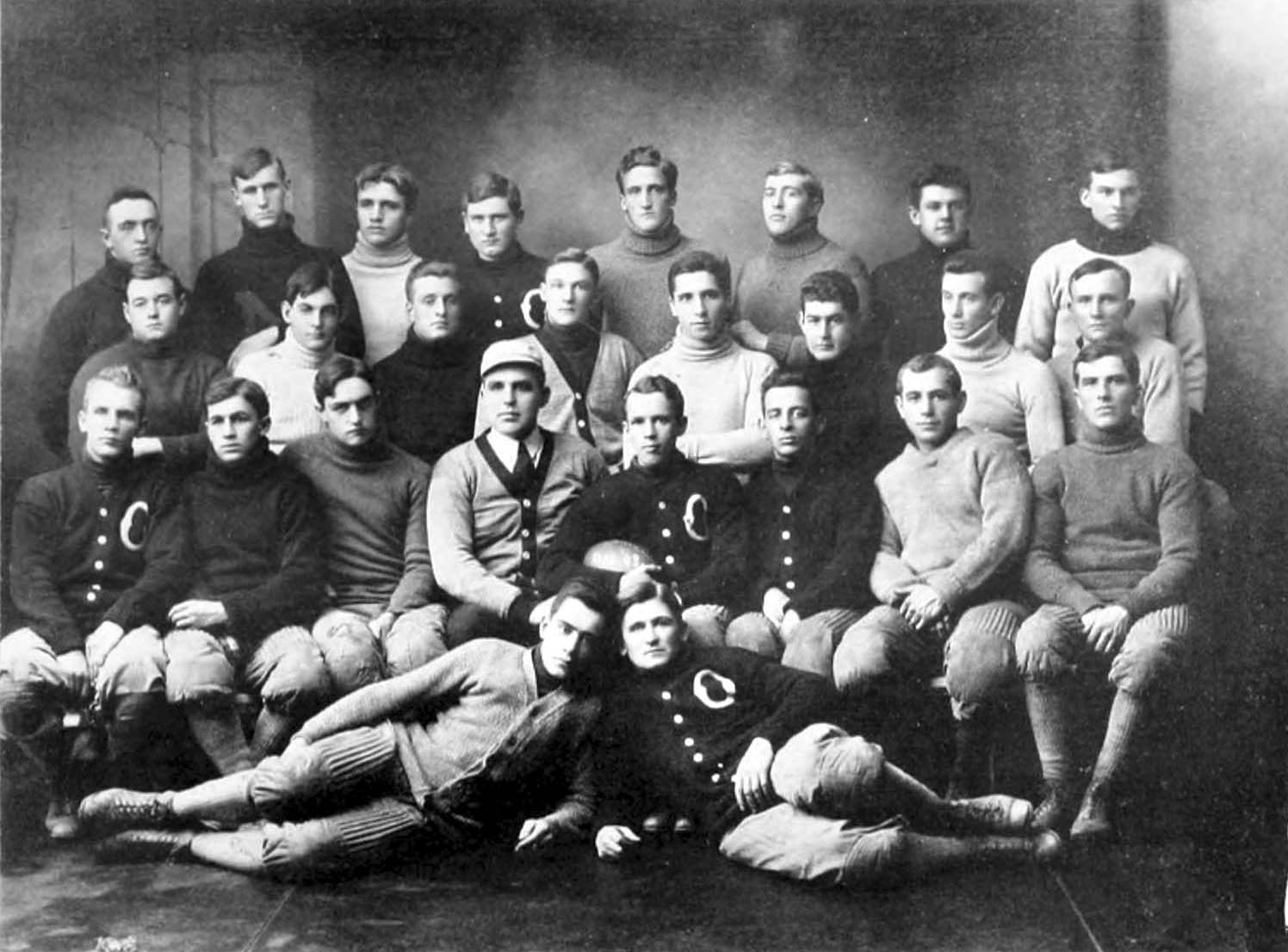
- Conference: Ohio Athletic Conference
- Record: 6–4 (4–3 OAC)
- Head coach: Albert E. Herrnstein (3rd season)
- Home stadium: Ohio Field

1908 Ohio Athletic Conference football standings
	Conf.					Overall
Team	W		L		T	W		L		T
Western Reserve $	6	–	1	–	0	9	–	1	–	0
Kenyon	3	–	1	–	1	7	–	1	–	1
Ohio State	4	–	3	–	0	6	–	4	–	0
Case	4	–	2	–	1	6	–	3	–	1
Oberlin	2	–	2	–	0	3	–	4	–	0
Denison	2	–	3	–	0	5	–	5	–	0
Ohio Wesleyan	2	–	3	–	0	4	–	4	–	0
Wooster	1	–	5	–	0	3	–	5	–	0
Heidelberg	0	–	4	–	0	1	–	6	–	0
$ – Conference champion

The 1908 Ohio State Buckeyes football team was an American football team that represented Ohio State University during the 1908 college football season. In their third season under head coach Albert E. Herrnstein, the Buckeyes compiled a 6–4 record and outscored their opponents by a combined total of 118 to 92.

== Schedule ==
Date	Opponent	Site	Result	Attendance	Source
September 26	Otterbein*	Ohio Field; Columbus, OH	W 18–0		
October 3	Wooster	Ohio Field; Columbus, OH	L 0–8		
October 10	Denison	Ohio Field; Columbus, OH	W 16–2		
October 17	Western Reserve	Ohio Field; Columbus, OH	L 0–18	4,000	
October 24	Michigan*	Ohio Field; Columbus, OH (rivalry)	L 6–10		
October 31	Ohio Wesleyan	Ohio Field; Columbus, OH	W 20–9		
November 7	at Case	Van Horn Field; Cleveland, OH	L 8–18		
November 14	at Vanderbilt*	Dudley Field; Nashville, TN	W 17–6		
November 21	Oberlin	Ohio Field; Columbus, OH	W 14–12		
November 26	Kenyon	Ohio Field; Columbus, OH	W 19–9		
*Non-conference game
