= Arnie Lerum =

American football player and coach (1879–1911)

Biographical details
- Born: July 20, 1879; Norway
- Died: June 25, 1911 (aged 31); Madison, Wisconsin, U.S.

Playing career
- 1899–1901: Wisconsin
- Position: Guard

Coaching career (HC unless noted)
- 1904: Stevens Point Normal

Head coaching record
- Overall: 1–2

Accomplishments and honors

Awards
- Third-team All-American (1902); All-Western (1901)

Arne Christopher Lerum (July 20, 1879 – June 25, 1911) was a Norwegian-American college football player and coach. He served as the head football coach at the University of Wisconsin–Stevens Point–then known as Stevens Point Normal School–in 1904, compiling a record of 1–2. Lerum selected as a guard on the 1901 All-Western college football team while playing for Wisconsin. Lerum immigrated to the United States from Bergen, Norway when he was 14. He was active in politics in as a Republican in the state of Wisconsin. Lerum died on cancer on June 25, 1911, in Madison, Wisconsin.

== Head coaching record ==
Year	Team	Overall	Conference	Standing	Bowl/playoffs
Stevens Point Normal (Independent) (1904)
1904	Stevens Point Normal	1–2			
Stevens Point Normal:		1–2			
Total:		1–2			
