= Everett Sweeley =

American football player and coach (1880–1957)

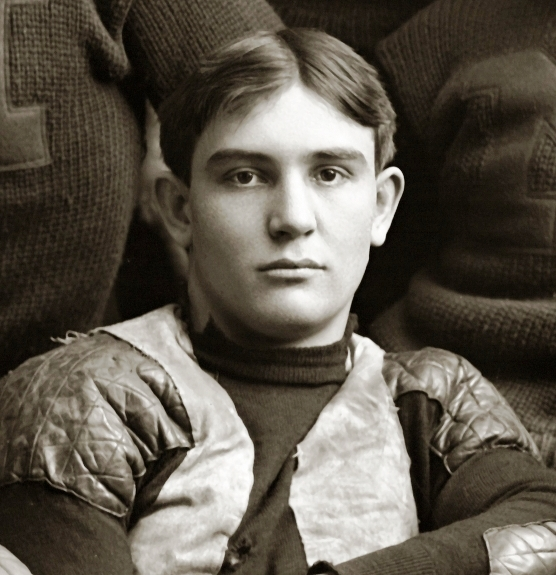
- Sweeley cropped from 1900 Michigan Wolverines team photograph

Biographical details
- Born: March 4, 1880; Adel, Iowa, U.S.
- Died: September 2, 1957 (aged 77); Twin Falls, Idaho, U.S.

Playing career

Football
- 1899–1902: Michigan
- Positions: Fullback, halfback, end, punter, kicker

Coaching career (HC unless noted)

Football
- 1903: Morningside
- 1904–1905: Washington Agricultural / State

Basketball
- 1905–1907: Washington State

Baseball
- 1905–1906: Washington Agricultural / State

Head coaching record
- Overall: 11–9 (football); 10–9 (basketball); 20–12 (baseball)

Accomplishments and honors

Championships
- 2× National (1901, 1902)

Awards
- Second-team All-American (1902)

Everett Marlin Sweeley (March 4, 1880 – September 2, 1957) was an American college football player and coach. He played fullback, halfback and end for the University of Michigan from 1899 to 1902 and was a member of Fielding H. Yost's 1901 and 1902 "Point-a-Minute" teams. He then served as the head football coach at Morningside College in 1903 and at Washington State University in 1904 and 1905. He also coached basketball and baseball at Washington State. After retiring from football, Sweeley became a lawyer and judge in Idaho.

== Biography ==
=== Early years ===
Sweeley was born in Adel, Iowa in 1880. At the time of the 1885 Iowa State Census, Sweeley was living in Storm Lake, Iowa. He attended high school at Sioux City, Iowa.

== University of Michigan ==
Sweeley enrolled at the University of Michigan in 1899. He played four years of football at Michigan from 1899 to 1902 at the end, fullback, and halfback positions, but he was best known as one of the game's premier punters and placekickers.

Before enrolling at Michigan, Sweeley said he had never seen a college football game. In four seasons, he missed only one game, the result of what Sweeley called "a little row with a math professor."

While playing for Michigan, Sweeley set the college football record for the longest kick on record. In 1902, he kicked the football 86 yards before touching the ground. Sweeley also held "an enviable distinction unboasted by any other hero of the gridiron." In four years punting for Michigan, he never had a single punt blocked. Sweeley was known for punts that were both high and long. He would reportedly tell his ends accurately where each punt was to go, "and by this concerted action Michigan gained many yards." Sweeley was also "an expert place kicker," scoring over 100 points for Michigan in this manner. A 1906 newspaper feature reported that his greatest talent was "the running punt trick," a play in which Sweeley would run a ball "until he was hard pressed and then kick, often thus adding many yards to the ground gained."

In the 1902 Rose Bowl, Sweeley kicked four field goals and punted 21 times for a 38.9-yard average. A newspaper story in 1950 reported on Sweeley's kicking ability: "Sweeley, a truly great kicker in the days when the ball resembled a pumpkin rather than the tapered oblate spheroid now in use, introduced the spiral pant to Coast fans that memorable day [in the 1902 Rose Bowl]. His towering punts outdistanced the end-over-end kicks of the Indians by 20 yards."

=== Coach ===
After graduating from Michigan, Sweeley went into coaching. He served as the head football coach at Morningside College in Sioux City, Iowa for a season in 1903 and then moved to Washington State University in Pullman, Washington for the 1904 and 1905 seasons. His record at Washington State was 6–6.

=== Later years ===
After retiring from coaching, Sweeley moved to Twin Falls, Idaho where he worked as a lawyer. In September 1907, he married Hazel Jury Brown (1886–1972) at Spokane, Washington. According to the 1920 United States Census, Sweeley and his wife had two children at that time, Jean B Sweeley (age 9) and Anna L. Sweeley (age 6).

Sweeley also became an expert trap shooter and ballistics expert. In 1916, he won the interstate trapshooting championship. He was elected prosecutor in 1938.

In his draft registration card signed in April 1942, Sweeley listed his residence as Twin Falls, his employer as the County of Twin Falls, and his place of employment as the County Courthouse in Twin Falls.

In 1952, Sweeley attended a reunion in California of the 1902 Rose Bowl team. At the time, Sweeley was a practicing attorney living in Twin Falls, and was recalled as "a great punter back at the turn of the century." He served as a probate judge in the mid-1950s.

== Head coaching record ==
=== Football ===
Year	Team	Overall	Conference	Standing	Bowl/playoffs
Morningside (Independent) (1903)
1903	Morningside	5–3			
Morningside:		5–3			
Washington Agricultural / Washington State (Independent) (1904–1905)
1904	Washington Agricultural	2–2			
1905	Washington State	4–4			
Washington Agricultural / State:		6–6			
Total:		11–9			
