= Bruce Shorts =

American football player and coach (1878–1945)

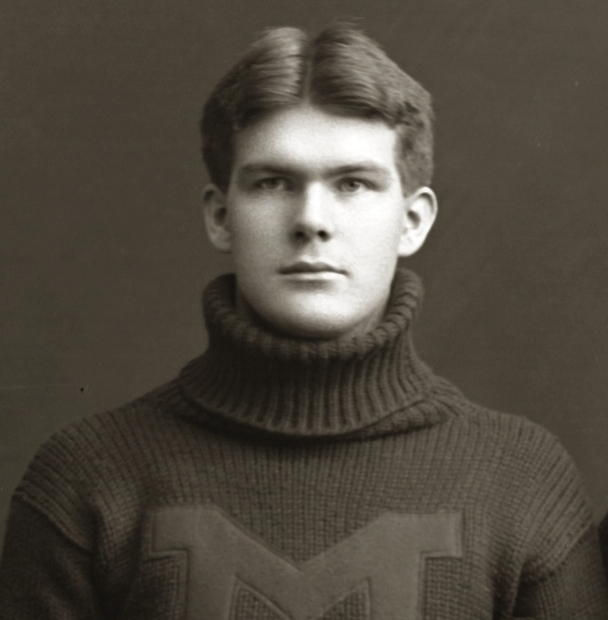

Biographical details
- Born: January 14, 1878; Belleville, Ontario, Canada
- Died: March 29, 1945 (aged 67); Fort Steilacoom, Washington, U.S.

Playing career
- 1900–1901: Michigan
- Position: Tackle

Coaching career (HC unless noted)
- 1904: Nevada State
- 1905: Oregon

Head coaching record
- Overall: 7–4–2

Accomplishments and honors

Championships
- National (1901)

Bruce Carman Shorts (January 15, 1878 – March 29, 1945) was an American college football player and coach. He played as a tackle at the University of Michigan from 1900 to 1901. Shorts served as the head football coach at the Nevada State University—now known as the University of Nevada, Reno—in 1904 and at the University of Oregon in 1905.

== Biography ==
=== Athlete ===
Shorts attended high school at Mount Pleasant, Michigan before enrolling at the University of Michigan. Shorts played for Fielding H. Yost's first Michigan Wolverines football team. The 1901 team compiled a record of 11–0 and outscored its opponents 550–0. He was regarded as one of the best tackles in the Western Conference. He was six feet one inch tall and weighed close to 190 pounds while playing at Michigan. He played in 1901 despite being sick. Coach Yost later recalled Shorts' efforts in playing through sickness as follows:

Well do I remember how dangerously near Bruce Shorts, star right tackle, came to being lost to the 1901 Michigan football team. He was very sick all season with an attack of appendicitis. His enforced withdrawal from the team would have greatly weakened it. In an evenly matched game one can visualize what his absence from the lineup would have meant. Shorts played through the season, but this nearly cost him his life, for he was a short time later so sick that it was reported he had died. However, he pulled through.

Prior to the 1902 Rose Bowl, the Los Angeles Times wrote a profile about the stars of the Michigan football team. About Shorts, the Times wrote: "Bruce Shorts, who is the newly chosen team captain of 1902 is 6 feet in height and weighs 190 pounds. For his two years he has played right tackle and his weight makes him one of the strongest men on the team. He is the best ground gainer of the line men."

In addition to football, Shorts also competed in the "weight" events for the Michigan track and field team. He won the Western intercollegiate championship in the hammer throw and was "also recognized as a very good shot-putter."

=== Coach and lawyer ===
Shorts graduated from the University of Michigan Law School. After practicing law for several months, Shorts was hired in September 1904 as the head football coach at the University of Nevada, Reno. He replaced another former Michigan football player, Allen Steckle, as Nevada's coach. A Reno newspaper reported on Shorts' hiring as follows:

Bruce Shorts, captain of the famous Michigan football team of 1901, arrived in Reno yesterday to enter upon his duties as coach of the University of Nevada team. Mr. Shorts is undoubtedly one of the best posted as well as one of the best football players in the country. ... He is looked upon as the best coach west of the Mississippi River, and his work this year will undoubtedly result in maintaining, if not surpassing, the record made by Coach Steckle last year.

The Nevada Sagebrush compiled a 3–3 record in Shorts' one year as head coach.

In 1905, Shorts was hired by the University of Oregon. The Oakland Tribune reported on Shorts' hiring at Oregon as follows: "This year the Oregonians are coached by Bruce Shorts, the great Michigan captain of 1902. Shorts coached Nevada last season and has a record for turning out fast players. Fred Staiwer is manager of the Oregon eleven."

Shorts later became a successful corporate lawyer in Seattle.

== Head coaching record ==
Year	Team	Overall	Conference	Standing	Bowl/playoffs
Nevada State Sagebrushers (Independent) (1904)
1904	Nevada State	3–3			
Nevada State:		3–3			
Oregon Webfoots (Independent) (1905–1906)
1905	Oregon	4–2–2			
Oregon:		4–2–2			
Total:		7–5–2			
