= Hugh White (American football) =

American football player (1876–1936)

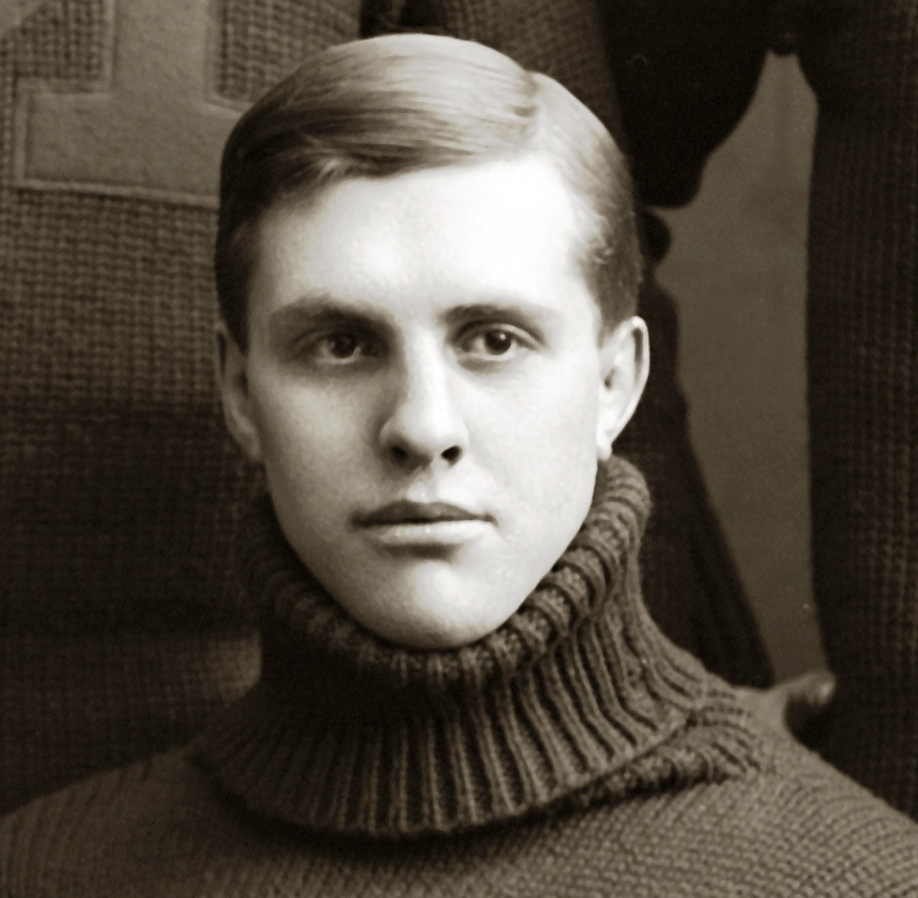
- White cropped from 1901 Michigan football team photograph

Profile
- Positions: Tackle, end

Personal information
- Born: November 7, 1876; Lapeer, Michigan, U.S.
- Died: June 11, 1936 (aged 59); Scarsdale, New York, U.S.
- Listed height: 5 ft 11 in (1.80 m)
- Listed weight: 180 lb (82 kg)

Career information
- College: Michigan (1898–1901)

Awards and highlights
- National champion (1901)

Hugh White (November 7, 1876 – June 11, 1936) was an American college football player and coach. He played for the University of Michigan from 1898 to 1901, and captained the national championship-winning 1901 team.

== Early life and education ==
White was born in Lapeer, Michigan, in 1876, the son of Henry Kirke White and Jane Wigglesworth White. His father had run away from home as a boy, crewed on a whaling ship, participated in the California Gold Rush, and fought in the American Civil War. White received a Ph.B in 1899 and an LL.B. in 1902 from the University of Michigan.

== College football career ==
White played left tackle for the Michigan during the 1898 season, left end in the 1899 season, and returned to left tackle in the 1900 and 1901 seasons. As a senior, he captained the 1901 Michigan Wolverines football team, the first of Fielding H. Yost's famous "Point-a-Minute" teams, which went undefeated with an 11–0 record, outscored their opponents 550–0, and defeated Stanford in the inaugural Rose Bowl, 49–0. In the Rose Bowl, Michigan put the ball in play 142 times for 1,463 offensive yards. Stanford coach Charles Fickert, asked Michigan coach Yost to stop the game, since his team was no match for Michigan, but Yost insisted the game continue. Yost had been ousted as Stanford's coach the year before. With eight minutes left in the game, White agreed with Stanford captain, R. S. Fisher, to stop play.

== Later life ==
In early 1902, White was considered for the football coaching job at Haskell Institute—now known as Haskell Indian Nations University—in Lawrence, Kansas and applied for the same post at Purdue University. In June 1902, he was hired as the football coach at Washington University in St. Louis. He married Abbie E. Cutting of Lapeer, Michigan, in 1903. They were the parents of three daughters, Elizabeth, Martha, and Marion. In 1904, White umpired Ivy League football games. He later worked as an engineer and became president (1924–1927) and Chairman of the Board (1927–1933) of the George A. Fuller Company, one of the largest construction companies in the United States, which erected major public buildings such as the Lincoln Memorial (1918), the United States Supreme Court Building (1933), and major office buildings. White served as Village President of Scarsdale, New York. He died of pneumonia on June 11, 1936, after a brief illness.

== Head coaching record ==
Year	Team	Overall	Conference	Standing	Bowl/playoffs
Washington University (Independent) (1902)
1902	Washington University	2–6–1			
Washington University:		2–6–1			
Total:		2–6–1			
