= 1902 Rose Bowl =

American college football game

1902 Tournament East–West football championship game
- 1st and Inaugural Rose Bowl Game
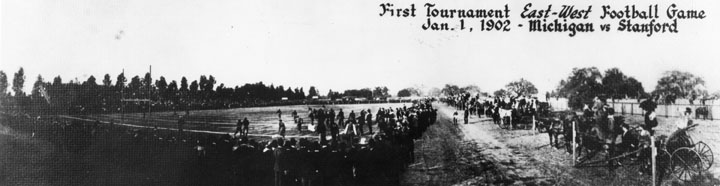
- Panoramic view of the game
Michigan Wolverines	Stanford
(10–0)	(3–1–2)
49	0
Head coach: Fielding H. Yost	Head coach: Charles Fickert
	1	2	3	4	Total
Michigan	0	17	32	0	49
Stanford	0	0	0	0	0
- Date: January 1, 1902
- Season: 1901
- Stadium: Tournament Park
- Location: Pasadena, California
- MVP: Neil Snow (Michigan FB)
- Referee: David Brown
- Attendance: 8,500 (estimated)

Originally titled the "Tournament East–West football game", what is now known as the Rose Bowl Game was first played on January 1, 1902, at Tournament Park in Pasadena, California, starting the tradition of New Year's Day bowl games.

The inaugural game featured Fielding H. Yost's dominating 1901 Michigan Wolverines football team, representing the East, who crushed a 3–1–2 team from Stanford University, representing the West, by a score of 49–0 after Stanford captain Ralph Fisher requested to quit with eight minutes remaining. Michigan finished the season 11–0 and was considered a national champion. Yost had been Stanford's coach the previous year.

== Organization of the game ==
The Tournament of Roses Parade began in 1890 as a New Year's Day tradition in the City of Pasadena. The city boosters were exploring a way to bring in tourism and money to the area. The Tournament of Roses Association president, James Wagner, guaranteed $3,500 to cover the expenses of bringing the football teams of the University of Michigan and Stanford University to Pasadena to play. The admission price was between 50 cents and a dollar to attend the game. An additional dollar would be charged to admit a family's horse and buggy to the grounds. The game was played in Tournament Park, where temporary stands were built. The officials were David Brown, referee (a graduate of Stanford and a former football manager); W. K. Peasley, umpire (a graduate of Williams); Phil Wilson, head linesman (a graduate of Stanford and former player) and C. G. Roe, linesman; Jack Sheehan (a graduate of Stanford) and H. K. Crafts, timers. The game kicked off at 2:30 p.m. sharp at the park on the corner of California Street and Wilson Avenue in Pasadena.

== Tournament Park ==
Before the Rose Bowl stadium was built for the 1923 Rose Bowl, games were played in Pasadena's Tournament Park, approximately three miles southeast of the current stadium. Tournament Park is now a private park maintained by the California Institute of Technology in Pasadena, California. It was simply known as the "town lot" before being renamed Tournament Park in 1900.

== Teams ==
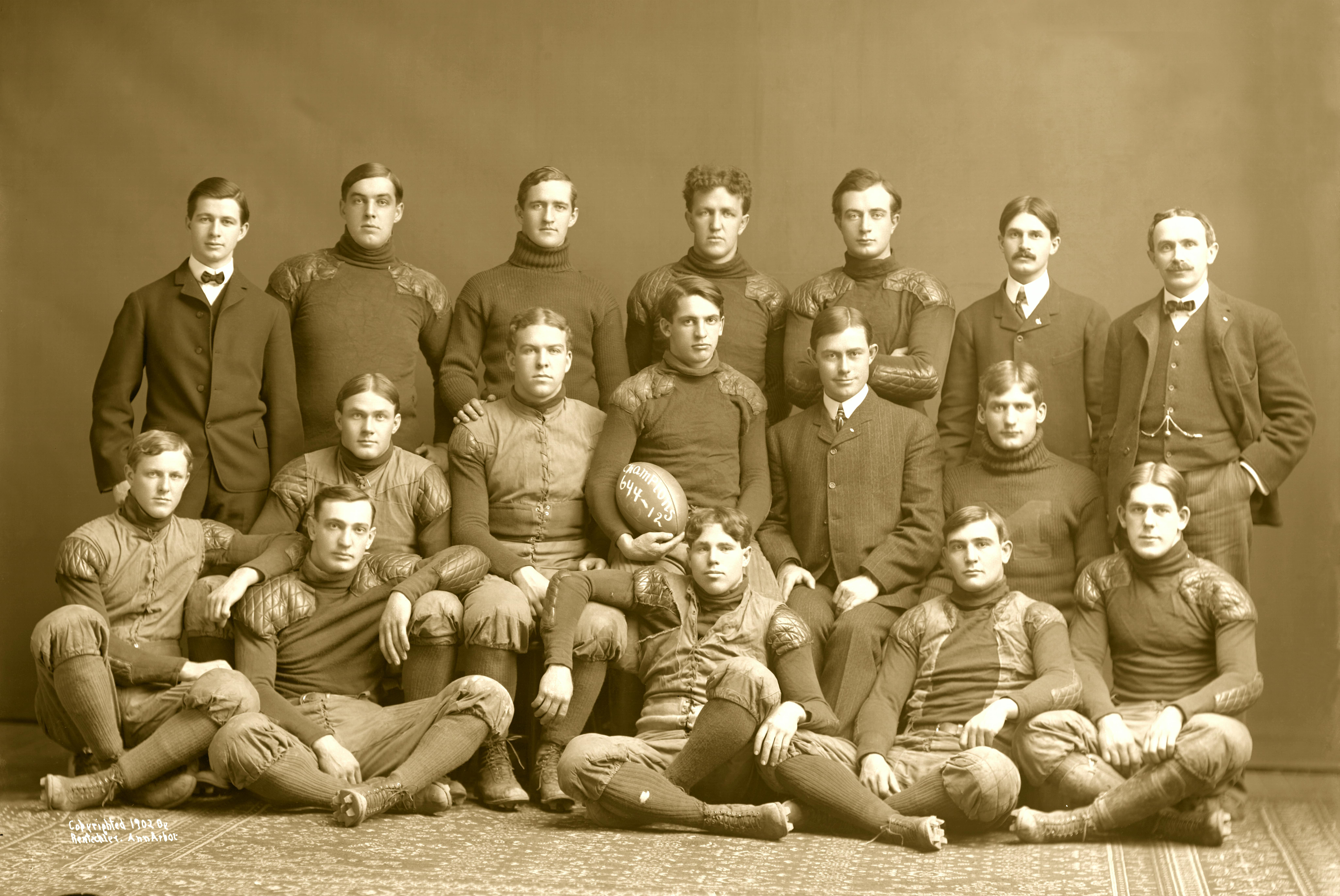
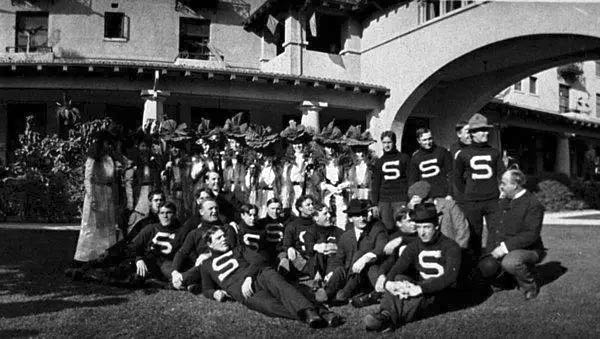
Michigan (left) and Stanford teams of 1902

Stanford had played the Olympic Club and the Reliance Athletic Club twice, beating and tying each. They beat Nevada State, 12–0, then lost to California in the 11th Big Game, 2–0.

The 1901 Michigan Wolverines football team was nicknamed the "Point-a-Minute" team when they came to Pasadena to play the game. The Wolverines had racked up 501 points while allowing their opponents no points at all. The 49 points they scored in the 1902 Rose Bowl game brought their season total to 550 to 0.

== Game summary ==
- The playing field was 110 yards long
- Touchdowns counted five points, field goals five, and conversions one (under modern scoring, the score would be 55–0)
- The game was divided into two thirty-minute halves
- A team had to make five yards in three downs to make a first down
- Forward passes were not allowed
- Substitutions were used infrequently, as 11 men usually played the entire game
- The game ended with eight minutes left on the clock upon request of Stanford captain Ralph Fisher and by agreement with Michigan team captain Hugh White. The time of halves was 35 minutes and 27 minutes, the latter shortened at the request of Stanford.

=== Scoring ===
==== First half ====
- Michigan – Neil Snow 5-yard run (Bruce Shorts kick) 6–0
- Michigan – Everett Sweeley 20-yard field goal 11–0
- Michigan – Curtis Redden 25-yard punt return (Shorts kick) 17–0

==== Second half ====
- Michigan – Snow 2-yard run (kick failed) 22–0
- Michigan – Redden 25-yard fumble recovery (Shorts kick) 28–0
- Michigan – Snow 8-yard run (kick failed) 33–0
- Michigan – Snow 17-yard run (kick failed) 38–0
- Michigan – Snow 4-yard run (Shorts kick) 44–0
- Michigan – Albert E. Herrnstein 21-yard run (kick failed) 49–0

=== Statistics ===
Team stats	Michigan	Stanford
First downs	27	5
Att–Yards rushing	90–527	24–67
Fumbles	1	9
Punts–Avg.	21–38.9	16–34.9

== Game records ==
Team	Performance vs. opponent	Year
Rushing yards	503, Michigan vs. Stanford	1902

== Aftermath ==
The game was so lopsided that for the next 13 years, the Tournament of Roses officials ran chariot races, ostrich races, and other various events instead of football. But, on New Year's Day 1916 football returned to stay as Washington State University defeated Brown University in the first annual Tournament of Roses football game. At Stanford, rugby replaced football from the 1906 season through the 1917 season.

In record keeping, Neil Snow's five touchdowns are noted along with the "modern" Rose Bowl record of four touchdowns held by Eric Ball, Sam Cunningham, and Ron Dayne. Snow was named the Most Valuable Player of the game when the award was created in 1953 and selections were made retroactively.

The initial attendance has varied according to different sources. The ESPN BCS article lists the attendance as 8,500. The Michigan football media guide and Michigan articles list the attendance as 8,000. The Official 2007 NCAA Division I football records book lists the attendance at 8,000.

Tournament Park would be the site for the second to eighth Rose Bowl Games from 1916 to 1922 before the Rose Bowl stadium opened for the 1923 Rose Bowl.

As of 2016, Stanford has appeared in the Rose Bowl 15 times, tied with Ohio State for third most, and Michigan has appeared 20 times, second most.

Stanford would make their next bowl appearance in 1925, the 1925 Rose Bowl. Michigan's next bowl game was in the 1948 Rose Bowl.

== See also ==
- List of historically significant college football games

== Books ==
- Maxwell Stiles - The Rose Bowl: A Complete Action and Pictorial Exposition of Rose Bowl Football, Sportsmaster Publications (1946), ASIN: B0007FBNU4
- America's New Year Celebration (The Rose Parade & Rose Bowl Game). Albion Publishing Group Santa Barbara, CA 1999. ISBN 1-880352-62-1
- The Rose Bowl Game by Rube Samuelsen. Doubleday Company and Inc. 1951. ASIN: B0007DZXFC
