= Albert E. Herrnstein =

American football player and coach (1882–1958)

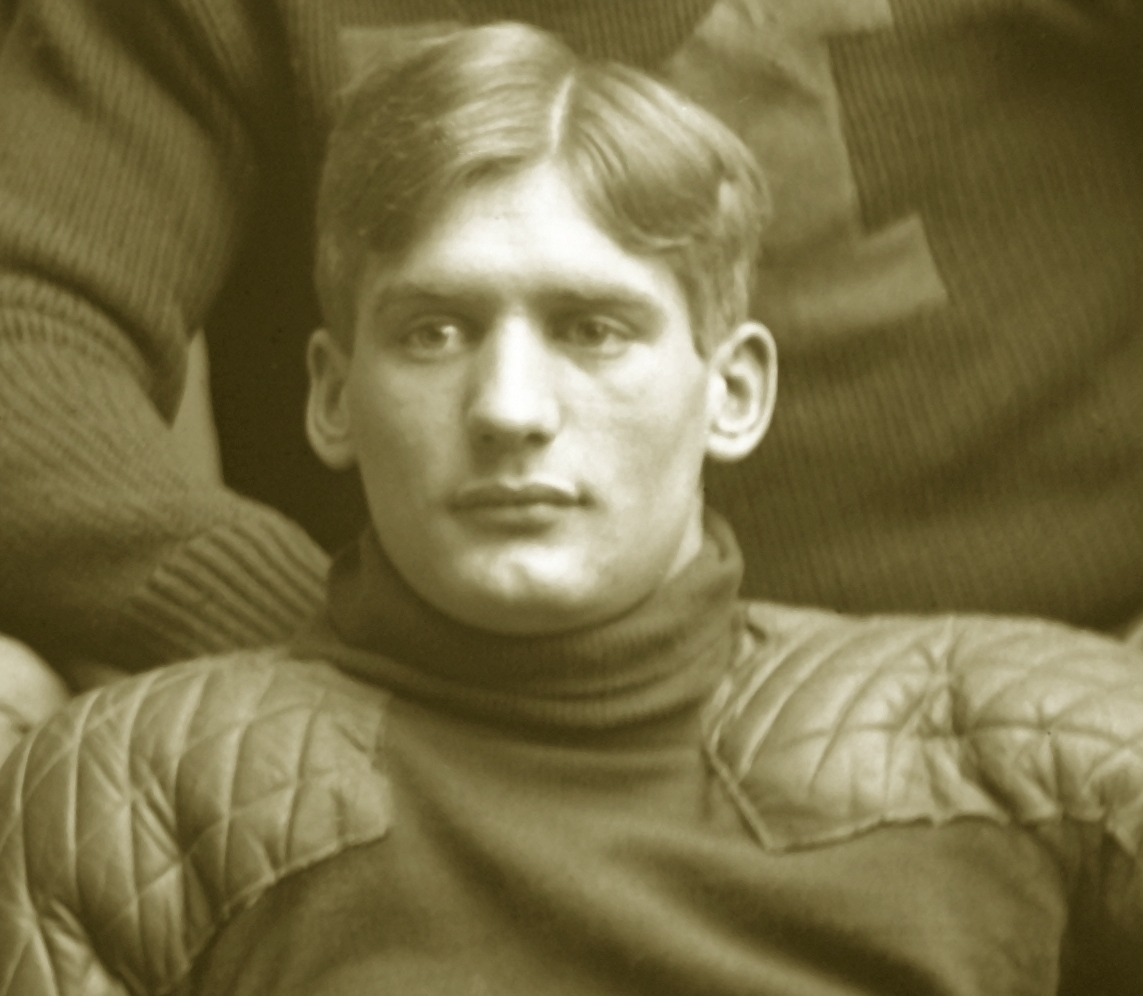
- Herrnstein cropped from 1900 Michigan Wolverines team photograph

Biographical details
- Born: August 15, 1882; Chillicothe, Ohio, U.S.
- Died: August 14, 1958 (aged 75); Chillicothe, Ohio, U.S.

Playing career
- 1899–1902: Michigan
- Positions: Halfback, end

Coaching career (HC unless noted)
- 1903–1904: Haskell
- 1905: Purdue
- 1906–1909: Ohio State

Head coaching record
- Overall: 49–15–2

Accomplishments and honors

Championships
- As coach: OAC (1906); As player: 2× National (1901, 1902)

Albert Ernest Herrnstein (August 15, 1882 – August 14, 1958) was an American football player and coach. He played at the University of Michigan as a halfback and end from 1899 to 1902 and was the head football coach at the Haskell Indian School (1903–1904), Purdue University (1905), and Ohio State University (1906–1909).

== University of Michigan ==
A native of Chillicothe, Ohio, Herrnstein attended the University of Michigan from 1899 to 1909. He played six years of varsity football and gained fame as one of the stars of Fielding H. Yost's "Point-a-Minute" teams that outscored their opponents 1,211–12 in 1901 and 1902. One of the highlights of Herrnstein's playing career was the 1902 Michigan – Ohio State game when he scored five touchdowns in an 86–0 rout of the Buckeyes. Herrnstein might have scored more touchdowns had the official not stopped the game halfway through the second half after concluding "the game was getting out of hand." As a member of the 1901 Wolverines team, Herrnstein played in the 1902 Rose Bowl, the first-ever college football bowl game. Herrnstein kicked a 21-yard field goal in the game, a 49–0 win over Stanford.

== Coaching ==
After graduating from Michigan in 1903, Herrnstein was hired as the football coach at the Haskell Indian School in Kansas, where he coached in 1903 and 1904. The Haskell football team went 7–3 in 1903, and in 1904 Herrnstein led them to the best record in the school's history to that point, finishing with an 8–1 record, and outscoring opponents 221–50. In 1905, Herrnstein was hired as the head coach of Purdue and led the Boilermakers to a 6–1–1 record. Herrnstein was hired by Ohio State in 1906, and his 1906 Buckeyes team was the best team the school had fielded to that point. The 1906 Buckeyes did not allow a single touchdown, outscored opponents 153–14, and compiled a record of 8–1. The one defeat was a 6–0 loss to Herrnstein's alma mater, Michigan. Herrnstein's 1906 team also threw the first forward pass in Ohio State history, a ten-yard touchdown pass in a game against Wooster. Herrnstein's 1907 team finished 7–2–1 with losses to Michigan and Case. In 1908, the Buckeyes slipped to 6–4, and Herrnstein failed in his third attempt to defeat Michigan. In 1908, Michigan's athletic director, Charles A. Baird, published a column about the upcoming football season and wrote the following of Herrnstein: "Herrnstein was a former Michigan star who is thoroughly acquainted with the Yost system and by several years of coaching at the Haskell Indian school, Purdue and Ohio State, has developed into a great teacher of football." In 1909, Herrnstein's Ohio State team was 7–3, but lost its fourth straight game to Michigan, this time by a score of 33–6. Herrnstein's four-year record at Ohio State was 28–10–1. He left Ohio State with more wins than any other coach in the school's history, a distinction he held until John Wilce compiled 78 wins from 1913 to 1928.

== Later years ==
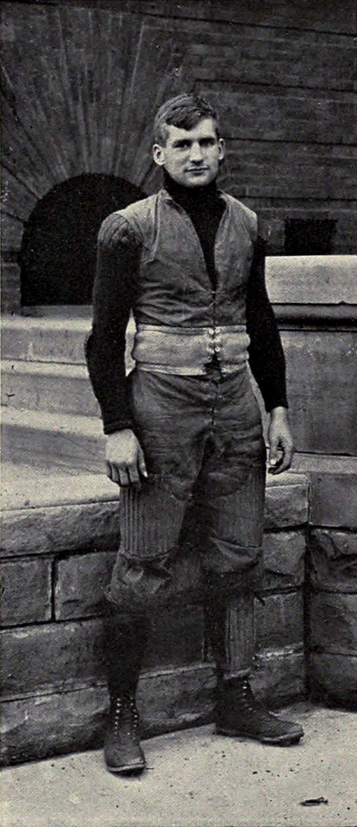
Herrnstein from the 1903 Michiganensian

In later years, Herrnstein operated the Herrnstein Hardware Co., a retail hardware store located at 72 N. Paint Street in Chillicothe, Ohio. He ran the hardware store for more than 50 years and was the president of the National Retail Hardware Association. He was also a director of the Chillicothe Mutual Building and Loan Co. from 1913 and the president of the company from 1931.

At the time of the 1910 United States census, Herrnstein was living at 303 Chestnut Street in Chillicothe with his wife Martha (age 25) and his daughter Martha (age 3). His occupation was listed as a merchant at a hardware store.

Herrnstein was the first of three generations of Herrnsteins to play football for the University of Michigan. His nephew, Bill Herrnstein, played for the Wolverines, and his grand nephew, John Herrnstein, was captain of the 1958 Michigan Wolverines football team.

Herrnstein died on the eve of his 76th birthday in 1958 at the Chillicothe Hospital. He had been ill for several months, and his death was caused by a heart ailment.

== Head coaching record ==
Year	Team	Overall	Conference	Standing	Bowl/playoffs
Haskell Indians (Independent) (1903–1904)
1903	Haskell	7–3			
1904	Haskell	8–1			
Haskell:		15–4			
Purdue Boilermakers (Western Conference) (1905)
1905	Purdue	6–1–1	1–1–1	4th	
Purdue:		6–1–1	1–1–1		
Ohio State Buckeyes (Ohio Athletic Conference) (1906–1909)
1906	Ohio State	8–1	3–0	1st	
1907	Ohio State	7–2–1	5–1–1	2nd	
1908	Ohio State	6–4	4–3	3rd	
1909	Ohio State	7–3	5–2	3rd	
Ohio State:		28–10–1	17–6–1		
Total:		49–15–2			
National championship Conference title Conference division title or championship game berth
