= List of Kansas Jayhawks football seasons =

The following is a list of Kansas Jayhawks football seasons including the coaches in each season and competition scores and rankings from 1890 to present day. The sports teams at the University of Kansas (KU), in Lawrence, Kansas, are known as the Jayhawks. When the University of Kansas fielded their first football team in 1890, the team was called the Jayhawkers.

== Yearly results ==
| Year | Coach | Overall | Conference | Standing | Bowl/playoffs | Coaches^{#} | AP^{°} |
|---|---|---|---|---|---|---|---|
Will Coleman (Kansas Intercollegiate Athletic Association) (1890)
| 1890 | Will Coleman | 1–2 | | | | | |
E. M. Hopkins (Kansas Intercollegiate Athletic Association) (1891)
| 1891 | E. M. Hopkins | 7–0–1 (Note: The outcome of Iowa's game vs. Kansas in 1891 was disputed. Iowa lists the game as an 18–14 Hawkeye victory, because Kansas left the field before the final play of the game. Iowa scored a touchdown and then the game was over. Kansas lists the game as a 14–12 victory.) | | | | | |
A. W. Shepard (Western Interstate University Football Association) (1892–1893)
| 1892 | A. W. Shepard | 7–1 | 3–0 | 1st | | | |
| 1893 | A. W. Shepard | 2–5 | 2–1 | T–1st | | | |
Hector Cowan (Western Interstate University Football Association) (1894–1896)
| 1894 | Hector Cowan | 2–3–1 | 1–2 | T–3rd | | | |
| 1895 | Hector Cowan | 6–1 | 2–1 | T–1st | | | |
| 1896 | Hector Cowan | 7–3 | 2–1 | 2nd | | | |
Wylie G. Woodruff (Western Interstate University Football Association) (1897)
| 1897 | Wylie G. Woodruff | 8–2 | 2–1 | 2nd | | | |
Wylie G. Woodruff (Independent) (1898)
| 1898 | Wylie G. Woodruff | 7–1 | | | | | |
Fielding H. Yost (Independent) (1899)
| 1899 | Fielding H. Yost | 10–0 | | | | | |
L. W. Boynton (Independent) (1900)
| 1900 | L. W. Boynton | 2–5–2 | | | | | |
John Outland (Independent) (1901)
| 1901 | John Outland | 3–5–2 | | | | | |
Arthur Curtis (Independent) (1902)
| 1902 | Arthur Curtis | 6–4 | | | | | |
Harrison Weeks (Independent) (1903)
| 1903 | Harrison Weeks | 6–3 | | | | | |
Bert Kennedy (Independent) (1904–1906)
| 1904 | Bert Kennedy | 8–1–1 | | | | | |
| 1905 | Bert Kennedy | 10–1 | | | | | |
| 1906 | Bert Kennedy | 6–2–2 | | | | | |
Bert Kennedy (MVIAA) (1907–1910)
| 1907 | Bert Kennedy | 5–3 | 1–1 | 3rd | | | |
| 1908 | Bert Kennedy | 9–0 | 4–0 | 1st | | | |
| 1909 | Bert Kennedy | 8–1 | 3–1 | 2nd | | | |
| 1910 | Bert Kennedy | 6–1–1 | 1–1–1 | 5th | | | |
Ralph W. Sherwin (MVIAA) (1911)
| 1911 | Ralph W. Sherwin | 4–2–2 | 1–1–1 | 3rd | | | |
Arthur Mosse (MVIAA) (1912–1913)
| 1912 | Arthur Mosse | 4–4 | 1–2 | 5th | | | |
| 1913 | Arthur Mosse | 5–3 | 3–2 | 3rd | | | |
H. M. Wheaton (MVIAA) (1914)
| 1914 | H. M. Wheaton | 5–2–1 | 2–2 | 4th | | | |
Herman Olcott (MVIAA) (1915–1917)
| 1915 | Herman Olcott | 6–2 | 3–1 | 2nd | | | |
| 1916 | Herman Olcott | 4–3–1 | 1–2–1 | 5th | | | |
| 1917 | Herman Olcott | 6–2 | 3–1 | T–2nd | | | |
Jay Bond (MVIAA) (1918)
| 1918 | Jay Bond | 2–2 | 0–0 | (Note: Due to events related to World War I and the 1918 flu pandemic, the Missouri Valley Intercollegiate Athletic Association did not schedule any official conference games, recorded no standings, and awarded no title for 1918.) | | | |
Leon McCarty (MVIAA) (1919)
| 1919 | Leon McCarty | 3–2–3 | 1–1–1 | 4th | | | |
Forrest C. Allen (MVIAA) (1920)
| 1920 | Forrest C. Allen | 5–2–1 | 3–2 | T–3rd | | | |
Potsy Clark (MVIAA) (1921–1925)
| 1921 | Potsy Clark | 4–3 | 3–3 | 5th | | | |
| 1922 | Potsy Clark | 3–4–1 | 1–3–1 | 8th | | | |
| 1923 | Potsy Clark | 5–0–3 | 3–0–3 | 2nd | | | |
| 1924 | Potsy Clark | 2–5–1 | 2–4–1 | 7th | | | |
| 1925 | Potsy Clark | 2–5–1 | 2–5–1 | 8th | | | |
Franklin Cappon (MVIAA) (1926–1927)
| 1926 | Franklin Cappon | 2–6 | 1–5 | 9th | | | |
| 1927 | Franklin Cappon | 3–4–1 | 3–3–1 | 5th | | | |
Franklin Cappon (MVIAA / Big Six Conference) (1928–1932)
| 1928 | Bill Hargiss | 2–4–2 | 1–3–1 | 5th | | | |
| 1929 | Bill Hargiss | 4–4 | 2–3 | 5th | | | |
| 1930 | Bill Hargiss | 6–2 | 4–1 | 1st | | | |
| 1931 | Bill Hargiss | 5–5 | 1–3 | 4th | | | |
| 1932 | Bill Hargiss; Ad Lindsey | 5–3 | 3–2 | T–2nd | | | |
Ad Lindsey (Big Six Conference) (1932–1938)
| 1933 | Ad Lindsey | 5–4–1 | 2–3 | 4th | | | |
| 1934 | Ad Lindsey | 3–4–3 | 1–2–2 | 4th | | | |
| 1935 | Ad Lindsey | 4–4–1 | 2–2–1 | 3rd | | | |
| 1936 | Ad Lindsey | 1–6–1 | 0–5 | 6th | | | |
| 1937 | Ad Lindsey | 3–4–2 | 2–1 | 3rd | | | |
| 1938 | Ad Lindsey | 3–6 | 1–4 | 6th | | | |
Gwinn Henry (Big Six Conference) (1939–1942)
| 1939 | Gwinn Henry | 2–6 | 1–4 | T–4th | | | |
| 1940 | Gwinn Henry | 2–7 | 0–5 | 6th | | | |
| 1941 | Gwinn Henry | 3–6 | 2–3 | 4th | | | |
| 1942 | Gwinn Henry | 2–8 | 1–4 | 6th | | | |
Henry Shenk (Big Six Conference) (1943–1945)
| 1943 | Henry Shenk | 4–5–1 | 2–3 | T–4th | | | |
| 1944 | Henry Shenk | 3–6–1 | 1–4 | T–5th | | | |
| 1945 | Henry Shenk | 4–5–1 | 1–3–1 | 5th | | | |
George Sauer (Big Six Conference) (1946–1947)
| 1946 | George Sauer | 7–2–1 | 4–1 | T–1st | | | |
| 1947 | George Sauer | 8–1–2 | 4–0–1 | T–1st | L Orange | | 12 |
J. V. Sikes (Big Seven Conference) (1948–1953)
| 1948 | J. V. Sikes | 7–3 | 4–2 | 3rd | | | |
| 1949 | J. V. Sikes | 5–5 | 2–4 | 5th | | | |
| 1950 | J. V. Sikes | 6–4 | 3–3 | 4th | | | |
| 1951 | J. V. Sikes | 8–2 | 4–2 | 3rd | | 20 | |
| 1952 | J. V. Sikes | 7–3 | 3–3 | 5th | | | |
| 1953 | J. V. Sikes | 2–8 | 2–4 | T–4th | | | |
Chuck Mather (Big Seven Conference) (1954–1957)
| 1954 | Chuck Mather | 0–10 | 0–6 | 7th | | | |
| 1955 | Chuck Mather | 3–6–1 | 1–4–1 | T–5th | | | |
| 1956 | Chuck Mather | 3–6–1 | 2–4 | T–5th | | | |
| 1957 | Chuck Mather | 5–4–1 | 4–2 | 2nd | | | |
Jack Mitchell (Big Seven / Big Eight Conference) (1958–1966)
| 1958 | Jack Mitchell | 4–5–1 | 3–2–1 | 4th | | | |
| 1959 | Jack Mitchell | 5–5 | 3–3 | T–3rd | | | |
| 1960 | Jack Mitchell | 7–2–1 (Note: Missouri lost to Kansas but now claims the win by default due to an ineligible Kansas player (Bert Coan). The 1960 Big Eight title was retroactively awarded to Missouri. Kansas and the NCAA recognize Kansas' win.) | 6–0–1 | 3rd | | T–9 | 11 |
| 1961 | Jack Mitchell | 7–3–1 | 5–2 | 3rd | W Bluebonnet | 15 | |
| 1962 | Jack Mitchell | 6–3–1 | 4–2–1 | 4th | | | |
| 1963 | Jack Mitchell | 5–5 | 3–4 | T–4th | | | |
| 1964 | Jack Mitchell | 6–4 | 5–2 | 3rd | | | |
| 1965 | Jack Mitchell | 2–8 | 2–5 | 7th | | | |
| 1966 | Jack Mitchell | 2–7–1 | 0–6–1 | 8th | | | |
Pepper Rodgers (Big Eight Conference) (1967–1970)
| 1967 | Pepper Rodgers | 5–5 | 5–2 | T–2nd | | | |
| 1968 | Pepper Rodgers | 9–2 | 6–1 | T–1st | L Orange | 6 | 7 |
| 1969 | Pepper Rodgers | 1–9 | 0–7 | 8th | | | |
| 1970 | Pepper Rodgers | 5–6 | 2–5 | 6th | | | |
Don Fambrough (Big Eight Conference) (1971–1974)
| 1971 | Don Fambrough | 4–7 | 2–5 | T–6th | | | |
| 1972 | Don Fambrough | 4–7 | 3–4 | 6th | | | |
| 1973 | Don Fambrough | 7–4–1 | 4–2–1 | T–2nd | L Liberty | T–15 | 18 |
| 1974 | Don Fambrough | 4–7 | 1–6 | 8th | | | |
Bud Moore (Big Eight Conference) (1975–1978)
| 1975 | Bud Moore | 7–5 | 4–3 | 4th | L Sun | | |
| 1976 | Bud Moore | 6–5 | 2–5 | 7th | | | |
| 1977 | Bud Moore | 3–7–1 (Note: In 1977, Kansas lost to UCLA 17–7. However, UCLA later forfeited the game, giving Kansas a 4–6–1 final record.) | 2–4–1 | 6th | | | |
| 1978 | Bud Moore | 1–10 | 0–7 | 8th | | | |
Don Fambrough (Big Eight Conference) (1979–1982)
| 1979 | Don Fambrough | 3–8 | 2–5 | T–5th | | | |
| 1980 | Don Fambrough | 4–5–2 | 3–3–1 | 4th | | | |
| 1981 | Don Fambrough | 8–4 | 4–3 | 4th | L Hall of Fame | | |
| 1982 | Don Fambrough | 2–7–2 | 1–5–1 | T–6th | | | |
Mike Gottfried (Big Eight Conference) (1983–1985)
| 1983 | Mike Gottfried | 4–6–1 | 2–5 | T–6th | | | |
| 1984 | Mike Gottfried | 5–6 | 4–3 | 4th | | | |
| 1985 | Mike Gottfried | 6–6 | 2–5 | 6th | | | |
Bob Valesente (Big Eight Conference) (1986–1987)
| 1986 | Bob Valesente | 3–8 | 0–7 | 8th | | | |
| 1987 | Bob Valesente | 1–9–1 | 0–6 | 7th | | | |
Glen Mason (Big Eight Conference) (1988–1995)
| 1988 | Glen Mason | 1–10 | 1–6 | 7th | | | |
| 1989 | Glen Mason | 4–7 | 2–5 | 6th | | | |
| 1990 | Glen Mason | 3–7–1 | 2–4–1 | T–4th | | | |
| 1991 | Glen Mason | 6–5 | 3–4 | 5th | | | |
| 1992 | Glen Mason | 8–4 | 4–3 | 3rd | W Aloha | 23 | 22 |
| 1993 | Glen Mason | 5–7 | 3–4 | 5th | | | |
| 1994 | Glen Mason | 6–5 | 3–4 | 5th | | | |
| 1995 | Glen Mason | 10–2 | 5–2 | T–2nd | W Aloha | 10 | 9 |
Glen Mason (Big 12 Conference) (1996)
| 1996 | Glen Mason | 4–7 | 2–6 | 5th (North) | | | |
Terry Allen (Big 12 Conference) (1997–2001)
| 1997 | Terry Allen | 5–6 | 3–5 | T–4th (North) | | | |
| 1998 | Terry Allen | 4–7 | 1–7 | T–5th (North) | | | |
| 1999 | Terry Allen | 5–7 | 3–5 | 4th (North) | | | |
| 2000 | Terry Allen | 4–7 | 2–6 | T–5th (North) | | | |
| 2001 | Terry Allen (Note: The Jayhawks were coached by head coach Terry Allen, who was fired on November 4 and replaced by interim head coach Tom Hayes.) | 3–8 | 1–7 | 6th (North) | | | |
Mark Mangino (Big 12 Conference) (2002–2009)
| 2002 | Mark Mangino | 2–10 | 0–8 | 6th (North) | | | |
| 2003 | Mark Mangino | 6–7 | 3–5 | T–4th (North) | L Tangerine | | |
| 2004 | Mark Mangino | 4–7 | 2–6 | T–5th (North) | | | |
| 2005 | Mark Mangino | 7–5 | 3–5 | 5th (North) | W Fort Worth | | |
| 2006 | Mark Mangino | 6–6 | 3–5 | 4th (North) | | | |
| 2007 | Mark Mangino | 12–1 | 7–1 | T–1st (North) | W Orange^{†} | 7 | 7 |
| 2008 | Mark Mangino | 8–5 | 4–4 | 3rd (North) | W Insight | | |
| 2009 | Mark Mangino | 5–7 | 1–7 | 6th (North) | | | |
Turner Gill (Big 12 Conference) (2010–2011)
| 2010 | Turner Gill | 3–9 | 1–7 | 6th (North) | | | |
| 2011 | Turner Gill | 2–10 | 0–9 | 10th | | | |
Charlie Weis (Big 12 Conference) (2012–2014)
| 2012 | Charlie Weis | 1–11 | 0–9 | 10th | | | |
| 2013 | Charlie Weis | 3–9 | 1–8 | 10th | | | |
| 2014 | Charlie Weis (Note: On September 28, after starting the year 2–2 and going only 6–22 in two-plus seasons, head coach Charlie Weis was fired. Linebackers coach Clint Bowen was named interim head coach for the remainder of the season.) | 3–9 | 1–8 | 9th | | | |
David Beaty (Big 12 Conference) (2015–2018)
| 2015 | David Beaty | 0–12 | 0–9 | 10th | | | |
| 2016 | David Beaty | 2–10 | 1–8 | 10th | | | |
| 2017 | David Beaty | 1–11 | 0–9 | 10th | | | |
| 2018 | David Beaty | 3–9 | 1–8 | 10th | | | |
Les Miles (Big 12 Conference) (2019–2020)
| 2019 | Les Miles | 3–9 | 1–8 | 10th | | | |
| 2020 | Les Miles | 0–9 | 0–8 | 10th | | | |
Lance Leipold (Big 12 Conference) (2021–present)
| 2021 | Lance Leipold | 2–10 | 1–8 | 10th | | | |
| 2022 | Lance Leipold | 6–7 | 3–6 | T–7th | L Liberty Bowl | | |
| 2023 | Lance Leipold | 9–4 | 5–4 | T–7th | W Guaranteed Rate Bowl | 23 | 23 |
| 2024 | Lance Leipold | 5–7 | 4–5 | 10th | | | |
| 2025 | Lance Leipold | 5–7 | 3–6 | T–11th | | | |
| 2026 | Lance Leipold | 4–7 | 2–6 | | | | |
| Total: | | 619–700–59 | | | | | |
National championship Conference title Conference division title or championship game berth
^{†}Indicates Bowl Coalition, Bowl Alliance, BCS, or CFP / New Years' Six bowl.; ^{#}Rankings from final Coaches Poll.
