= Independent (college sports) =

Classification used in U.S. college sports

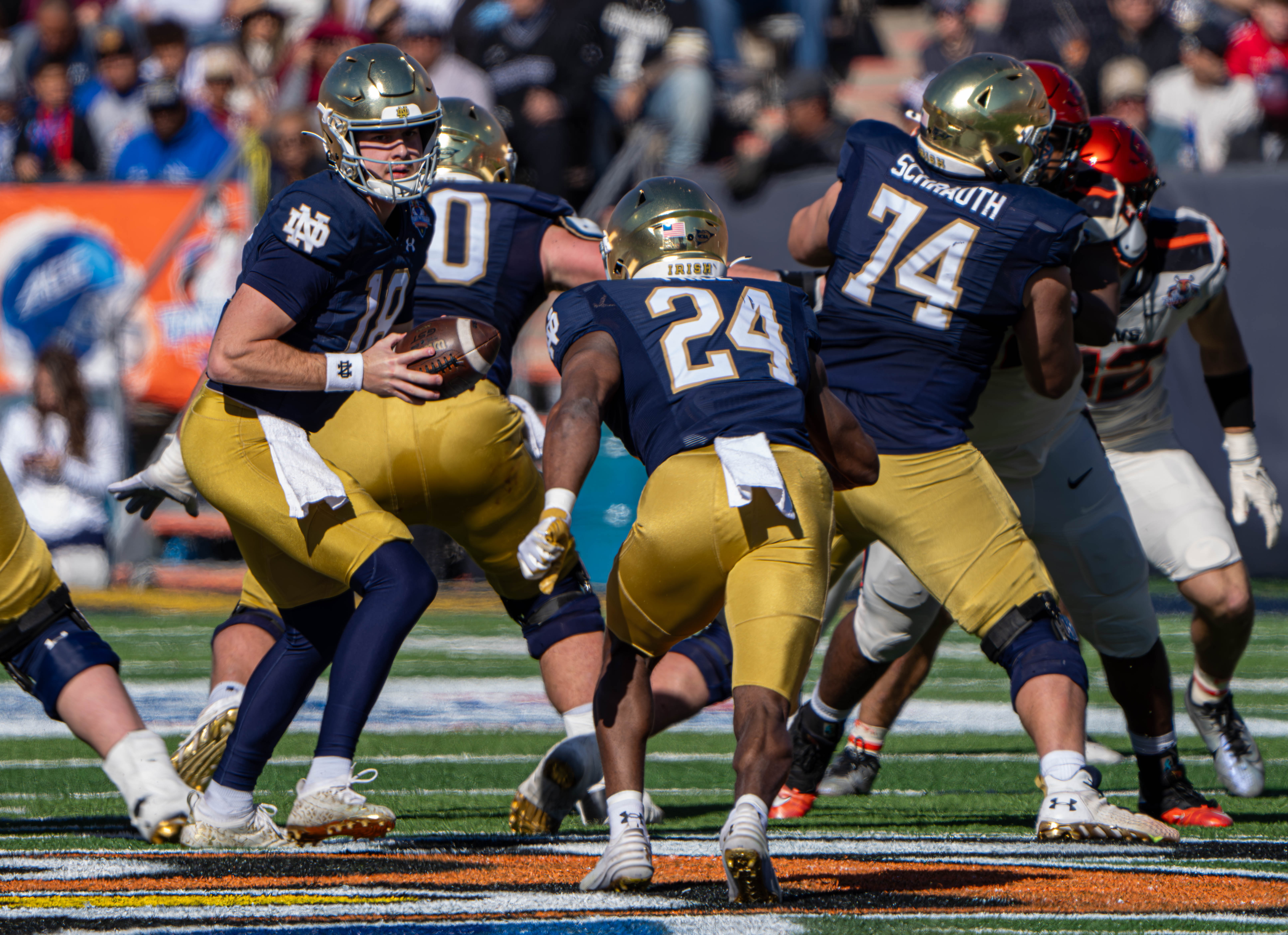
Players of the Notre Dame Fighting Irish football team, in blue, which has a long history of competing as an independent in college football

Independent, in the context of college athletics in the United States, refers to college and university sports teams that do not compete as members of an athletic conference. Accordingly, they do not compete for conference championships and do not share in conference revenues, including television revenue. Independents also are not obligated to play games against other members of a conference and generally have greater freedom, and sometimes difficulty, in scheduling opponents.

== History ==
In the 19th century, most schools competed without conference affiliations. In 1900, the majority of football teams (including Army, Brown, Bucknell, Carlisle, Columbia, Cornell, Dartmouth, Drake, Harvard, Holy Cross, Iowa State, Lafayette, Lehigh, Massachusetts, Navy, Nebraska, Notre Dame, Penn, Penn State, Princeton, Syracuse, Wesleyan, and Yale) competed as independents.

Efforts to organize into conferences began in 1888 with the formation of the Michigan Intercollegiate Athletic Association and continued over several decades with the formation of, among other conferences, the Southern Intercollegiate Athletic Association (1892), Big Ten Conference (1895), Ohio Athletic Conference (1902), Missouri Valley Conference (1907, predecessor to the Big Eight Conference), Southwest Conference (1914), Pacific Coast Conference (1915), Southern Conference (1921), Border Conference (1931), Southeastern Conference (1932), Mid-American Conference (1946), and Atlantic Coast Conference (1953). The growth of conferences has resulted in fewer schools and teams competing as independents.

The decline of independent college football programs accelerated rapidly after 1990. In 1990, there were 26 Division I-A independents, a total that was reduced to nine in 2000, and only three (Army, Navy, and Notre Dame) by 2010. The 2010s saw a slight increase in independents, with BYU, Liberty, New Mexico State, and UMass joining the independent ranks by 2019. Liberty, New Mexico State, and UMass became independent due to trouble finding conferences to play in, while BYU wanted more access and exposure. The challenges of being an independent team in the 2010s caused Idaho to drop from NCAA Division I Football Bowl Subdivision (FBS) to NCAA Division I Football Championship Subdivision (FCS) in order to join a conference. Notably, Notre Dame played the 2020 season as a member of the ACC due to the challenges of scheduling as an independent during the COVID-19 pandemic.

== Current state ==
As of the 2026 college football season, only two FBS teams are independent: UConn and Notre Dame. Army and Navy, two traditionally independent teams, joined the American Athletic Conference in 2024 and 2015, respectively, in order to have better access at bowl games and ultimately make more money, the common reason why teams join conferences. Notre Dame remains independent due to their $20 million television deal with NBC, while UConn, being a college basketball powerhouse, prioritizes having their men's and women's basketball programs in the Big East, a conference that does not sponsor football.

== List of historic independent football programs ==
The following is an incomplete list of college programs that have been independents in college football. Since most schools were independent in the early years of college football, the list is limited to programs that competed as independents after 1939.

Team	Years as independent	Source
Air Force	1955–1979	
Akron	1891–1914, 1937–1947, 1966–1977, 1987–1991	
Arkansas State	1911–1929, 1951–1963, 1987–1992, 1996–1998	
Army	1890–1997, 2005–2023	
Boston College	1893–1990	
Boston University	1884, 1886–1887, 1891–1897, 1904–1905, 1917–1942, 1945–1972	
Bowling Green	1919–1920, 1932, 1942–1951	
Brown	1878, 1880, 1886, 1889–1953	
Bucknell	1881–1957, 1970–1985	
Buffalo	1894–1903, 1915–1925, 1935–1942, 1946–1970, 1977–1998	
BYU	2011–2022	
Cal Poly	1915–1921, 1925–1945, 1996–2003	
Carnegie Mellon	1906–1957	
Central Michigan	1896–1926, 1931–1949, 1970–1974	
Chattanooga	1899–1913, 1942–1976	
Cincinnati	1885–1909, 1938–1946, 1953–1956, 1970–1995	
Coast Guard	1922–1923, 1926–1991	
Colgate	1890–1917, 1919–1985	
Colorado State	1962–1967	
Columbia	1870, 1872–1884, 1889–1891, 1899–1905, 1915–1953	
Cornell	1887–1917, 1919–1952	
Dartmouth	1881–1884, 1886–1953	
Dayton	1905–1925, 1939–1992	
Delaware	1889–1945, 1947–1957, 1970–1985	
Detroit	1896–1907, 1909−1948, 1957–1964	
Drake	1893−1907, 1952–1970, 1987–1992	
Drexel	1892−1909, 1918−1936, 1941−1942, 1944−1957, 1970−1973	
Duquesne	1891–1894, 1896–1903, 1913–1914, 1920–1923, 1930–1942, 1947–1950	
East Carolina	1932–1946, 1962–1964, 1977–1996	
Eastern Michigan	1891–1893, 1895, 1902–1919, 1926, 1931–1949, 1966–1975	
Ferris State	1899–1937, 1946–1973	
Florida State	1947, 1951–1991	
Florida A&M	1907–1925, 1984–1985, 2004,	
Fordham	1881–1954, 1970–1972, 1978–1984, 1989	
Fresno State	1921, 1942–1945, 1951–1952	
Georgetown	1881–1906, 1922–1950, 1964–1992	
Georgia Southern	1924–1941, 1982–1991	
Georgia Tech	1892–1915, 1964–1982	
Harvard	1873–1952	
Hawaii	1909–1978	
Holy Cross	1891–1985	
Houston	1950, 1960–1975	
Idaho	1894–1907, 1959–1964, 2013	
Illinois State	1887–1907, 1970–1980	
Indiana State	1896–1933, 1968–1975	
Lafayette	1882–1985	
Liberty	1973–2001, 2018–2022	
Louisiana	1901–1947, 1982–1992, 1996–2000	
Louisiana Tech	1901–1914, 1987–1992, 1996–2000	
Louisiana–Monroe	1951–1952, 1972–1981, 1994–2000	
Louisville	1912–1925, 1949–1962, 1975–1995	
Loyola of Los Angeles	1889, 1897, 1901–1909, 1919–1951	
Marquette	c.1892–1960	
Marshall	1895–1924, 1952–1953, 1969–1976	
Memphis	1912–1927, 1947–1967, 1973–1995	
Miami (FL)	1927–1928, 1942–1990	
Miami (OH)	1888–1910; 1940–1946	
Michigan State	1908–1952	
Middle Tennessee	1911–1951, 1999–2000	
Montana	1897–1923, 1950, 1962	
Navy	1879–2014	
Nevada	1896–1924, 1940–1953, 1969–1978	
New Mexico State	1893–1930, 1962–1970, 2013, 2018–2022	
North Texas	1913–1921, 1975–1982, 1995	
Northern Illinois	1899–1921, 1926–1927, 1966–1974, 1986–1992, 1996	
Notre Dame	1887–2019, 2021–present	
NYU	1873–1876, 1879, 1882–1883, 1886, 1889–1892, 1894–1941, 1944–1952	
Ohio	1894–1909, 1939–1946	
Oregon	1896–1901, 1903–1907, 1959–1963	
Oregon State	1898–1901, 1903–1907, 1909–1911, 1959–1963	
Pacific (CA)	1895, 1898–1899, 1919–1921, 1924, 1943–1945, 1949–1968	
Penn	1876–1953	
Penn State	1887–1890, 1892–1992	
Pittsburgh	1890–1990	
Portland	1927–1942, 1946–1949	
Princeton	1869–1953	
Richmond	1881–1900, 1922–1926, 1976–1985	
Rutgers	1895–1928, 1952–1957, 1962–1990	
Saint Mary's	1892-1899, 1915-1924, 1929-1950, 1970-2003	
San Diego State	1925, 1942, 1945, 1968, 1976-1977	
San Francisco	c.1925–1926, 1929–1951	
San Jose State	1893–1921, 1936–1938, 1950–1968	
Santa Clara	1896–1952, 1959–1981	
South Carolina	1892–1921, 1971–1991	
South Florida	1997–2002	
Southern Miss	1912–1930, 1942–1947, 1952–1995	
Syracuse	1889–1990	
Tampa	1933–1937, 1942, 1946, 1950–1974	
Temple	1894–1957, 1970–1990, 2005–2006	
Toledo	1917–1920, 1948–1951	
Troy	1909–1937, 1991–1995, 2001–2003	
Tulane	1893–1894, 1966–1995	
Tulsa	1895–1913, 1986–1995	
UAB	1991–1998	
UCF	1979–2001	
UConn	1896, 2000–2003, 2020–present	
UMass	1879–1896, 1930–1946, 2016–2024	
UNLV	1968–1981	
Utah State	1892–1901, 1962–1977, 2001–2002	
UTEP	1914–1934, 1962–1967	
Villanova	1894–1980, 1985–1987	
Virginia	1888–1899, 1906–1911, 1937–1953	
Virginia Tech	1892–1897, 1899–1911, 1965–1990	
Washington State	1894–1916, 1918, 1959–1961	
Washington University	1887–1906, 1947–1962, 1973–1987	
Wayne State	1918–1926, 1931–1945, 1947–1954, 1966–1974	
West Texas State	1910–1924, 1931–1938, 1962–1970, 1992–1994	
West Virginia	1891–1924, 1928–1949, 1968–1990	
Western Kentucky	1913–1925, 1982–1998, 2007–2008	
Western Michigan	1906–c.1925, 1932–1946	
Wichita State	1895–1923, 1927, 1940–1945, 1986	
William & Mary	1893–1894, 1896–1902, 1922–1926, 1977–1992	
Xavier	c.1916–1920, 1935–1943, 1946–1973	
Yale	1872–1953	
Youngstown State	1938–1942, 1947–1977, 1988–1996	

== See also ==
- List of NCAA Division I FCS football programs
- NCAA Division I FBS independent schools
- NCAA Division I independent schools
- NCAA Division II independent schools
- NCAA Division III independent schools
- NAIA independent schools
