= Arthur Tuttle =

Arthur Tuttle may refer to:

- Arthur J. Tuttle (1868–1944), United States district judge
- Arthur L. Tuttle (1870–1957), American football player and coach, mining engineer and executive
- Arthur S. Tuttle (1865–1949), American civil engineer
