= 1919 Missouri Tigers football team =

American college football season

1919 Missouri Tigers football

MVC champion
- Conference: Missouri Valley Conference
- Record: 5–1–2 (4–0–1 MVC)
- Head coach: John F. Miller (1st season)
- Captain: Anton Stankowski
- Home stadium: Rollins Field

1919 Missouri Valley Conference football standings
	Conf.					Overall
Team	W		L		T	W		L		T
Missouri $	4	–	0	–	1	5	–	1	–	2
Iowa State	3	–	1	–	1	5	–	2	–	1
Washington University	2	–	2	–	0	5	–	2	–	0
Drake	2	–	2	–	0	4	–	3	–	0
Kansas	1	–	1	–	1	3	–	2	–	3
Kansas State	0	–	3	–	1	3	–	5	–	1
Grinnell	0	–	3	–	0	1	–	4	–	1
$ – Conference champion

The 1919 Missouri Tigers football team was an American football team that represented the University of Missouri in the Missouri Valley Conference (MVC) during the 1919 college football season. The team compiled a 5–1–2 record (4–0–1 against MVC opponents), won the championship, and outscored all opponents by a combined total of 91 to 42. John F. Miller was the head coach for his first and only season. The team played its home games at Rollins Field in Columbia, Missouri.

== Schedule ==
Date	Time	Opponent	Site	Result	Attendance	Source
October 4		Drury*	Rollins Field; Columbia, MO	W 41–0		
October 11		at Kansas State	Ahearn Field; Manhattan, KS	T 6–6		
October 18		Iowa State	Rollins Field; Columbia, MO (rivalry)	W 10–0		
October 25		Drake	Rollins Field; Columbia, MO	W 3–0		
November 1		at Oklahoma*	Boyd Field; Norman, OK (rivalry)	T 6–6		
November 8		Nebraska*	Rollins Field; Columbia, MO (rivalry)	L 5–12		
November 15	3:00 p.m.	at Washington University	Francis Field; St. Louis, MO	W 7–0	11,000	
November 27		at Kansas	McCook Field; Lawrence, KS (rivalry)	W 13–6	8,000	
*Non-conference game; All times are in Central time
