= 1900 Haskell Indians football team =

American college football season

1900 Haskell Indians football
- Conference: Independent
- Record: 9–1
- Head coach: Alfred G. Ellick (1st season)
- Captain: Chauncey Archiquette

1900 Midwestern college football independents records
| | Conf. | | | Overall |
| Team | W | L | T | W | | L | | T |
|---|---|---|---|---|---|---|---|---|
| Central Michigan | | – | | 1 | – | 0 | – | 0 |
| Lake Forest | | – | | 1 | – | 0 | – | 0 |
| Haskell | | – | | 9 | – | 1 | – | 0 |
| North Dakota Agricultural | | – | | 8 | – | 1 | – | 1 |
| Ohio State | | – | | 8 | – | 1 | – | 1 |
| Nebraska | | – | | 6 | – | 1 | – | 1 |
| Beloit | | – | | 7 | – | 1 | – | 2 |
| Kirksville Osteopaths | | – | | 7 | – | 2 | – | 1 |
| Washburn | | – | | 6 | – | 2 | – | 0 |
| Wittenberg | | – | | 5 | – | 2 | – | 1 |
| Drake | | – | | 6 | – | 3 | – | 0 |
| Doane | | – | | 2 | – | 1 | – | 0 |
| Notre Dame | | – | | 6 | – | 3 | – | 1 |
| Fairmount | | – | | 5 | – | 3 | – | 0 |
| Detroit College | | – | | 3 | – | 2 | – | 0 |
| South Dakota Agricultural | | – | | 3 | – | 2 | – | 0 |
| Washington University | | – | | 3 | – | 2 | – | 1 |
| Carthage | | – | | 4 | – | 3 | – | 0 |
| Wabash | | – | | 5 | – | 4 | – | 0 |
| Lincoln (MO) | | – | | 2 | – | 2 | – | 0 |
| Missouri | | – | | 4 | – | 4 | – | 1 |
| Northern Illinois State | | – | | 2 | – | 2 | – | 2 |
| Iowa State Normal | | – | | 3 | – | 4 | – | 1 |
| Buchtel | | – | | 2 | – | 3 | – | 1 |
| Cincinnati | | – | | 3 | – | 5 | – | 1 |
| Ohio | | – | | 2 | – | 4 | – | 1 |
| Kansas State | | – | | 2 | – | 4 | – | 0 |
| Kansas | | – | | 2 | – | 5 | – | 2 |
| Ohio Wesleyan | | – | | 2 | – | 5 | – | 2 |
| Iowa State | | – | | 2 | – | 5 | – | 1 |
| Butler | | – | | 0 | – | 1 | – | 3 |
| Heidelberg | | – | | 0 | – | 2 | – | 2 |
| Chicago P&S | | – | | 1 | – | 3 | – | 0 |
| Mount Union | | – | | 1 | – | 4 | – | 1 |
| Miami (OH) | | – | | 0 | – | 4 | – | 0 |

The 1900 Haskell Indians football team was an American football team that represented the Haskell Indian Institute (now known as Haskell Indian Nations University) as an independent during the 1900 college football season. In its first season under head coach Alfred G. Ellick, Haskell compiled a 9–1 record and shut out six of ten opponents. Chauncey Archiquette was the team captain.

== Schedule ==
| Date | Time | Opponent | Site | Result | Attendance | Source |
|---|---|---|---|---|---|---|
| September 26 | | at Kansas State Normal | Emporia, KS | W 28–0 | | |
| September 29 | | at Washburn | Washburn Field; Topeka, KS | L 0–11 | | |
| October 8 | | at Missouri | Rollins Field; Columbia, MO | W 11–0 | | |
| October 13 | | Kansas State Normal | Lawrence, KS | W 16–0 | | |
| October 22 | | at Ottawa (KS) | Ottawa, KS | W 6–5 | | |
| October 29 | | at Warrensburg Normal | Warrensburg, MO | W 16–0 | | |
| November 3 | | Washburn | Lawrence, KS | W 11–5 | | |
| November 10 | | Ottawa (KS) | Lawrence, KS | W 11–0 | | |
| November 24 | 3:15 p.m. | at Cincinnati | Cincinnati, OH | W 16–0 | 300 | |
| November 29 | | at Ohio Medical | Columbus, OH | W (forfeit) | | |
