= 1919 Washington University Pikers football team =

American college football season

1919 Washington University Pikers football
- Conference: Missouri Valley Conference
- Record: 5–2 (2–2 MVC)
- Head coach: Dick Rutherford (3rd season)
- Home stadium: Francis Field

1919 Missouri Valley Conference football standings
| | Conf. | | | | | Overall |
| Team | W | | L | | T | W | | L | | T |
|---|---|---|---|---|---|---|---|---|---|---|
| Missouri $ | 4 | – | 0 | – | 1 | 5 | – | 1 | – | 2 |
| Iowa State | 3 | – | 1 | – | 1 | 5 | – | 2 | – | 1 |
| Washington University | 2 | – | 2 | – | 0 | 5 | – | 2 | – | 0 |
| Drake | 2 | – | 2 | – | 0 | 4 | – | 3 | – | 0 |
| Kansas | 1 | – | 1 | – | 1 | 3 | – | 2 | – | 3 |
| Kansas State | 0 | – | 3 | – | 1 | 3 | – | 5 | – | 1 |
| Grinnell | 0 | – | 3 | – | 0 | 1 | – | 4 | – | 1 |
$ – Conference champion

The 1919 Washington University Pikers football team represented Washington University in St. Louis as a member of the Missouri Valley Conference (MVC) during the 1919 college football season. In its third and final season under head coach Dick Rutherford, the team compiled a 5–2 record (2–2 against MVC opponents), tied for third place in the conference, and outscored opponents by a total of 127 to 30.

== Schedule ==
| Date | Time | Opponent | Site | Result | Attendance | Source |
|---|---|---|---|---|---|---|
| October 11 | 3:00 p.m. | Drury* | Francis Field; St. Louis, MO | W 51–0 | | |
| October 18 | 3:00 p.m. | Kansas State | Francis Field; St. Louis, MO | W 14–9 | | |
| October 25 | 3:00 p.m. | Grinnell | Francis Field; St. Louis, MO | W 13–0 | | |
| November 1 | | Missouri Mines* | Francis Field; St. Louis, MO | W 29–0 | 2,500 | |
| November 8 | | at Drake | Drake Stadium; Des Moines, IA | L 13–14 | | |
| November 15 | 3:00 p.m. | Missouri | Francis Field; St. Louis, MO | L 0–7 | 11,000 | |
| November 27 | 2:30 p.m. | at Saint Louis* | Sportsman's Park; St. Louis, MO | W 7–0 | 12,000 | |
*Non-conference game; All times are in Central time
