= 1919 Kansas State Farmers football team =

American college football season

1919 Kansas State Farmers football
- Conference: Missouri Valley Conference
- Record: 3–5–1 (0–3–1 MVC)
- Head coach: Zora Clevenger (4th season)
- Home stadium: Ahearn Field

1919 Missouri Valley Conference football standings
	Conf.					Overall
Team	W		L		T	W		L		T
Missouri $	4	–	0	–	1	5	–	1	–	2
Iowa State	3	–	1	–	1	5	–	2	–	1
Washington University	2	–	2	–	0	5	–	2	–	0
Drake	2	–	2	–	0	4	–	3	–	0
Kansas	1	–	1	–	1	3	–	2	–	3
Kansas State	0	–	3	–	1	3	–	5	–	1
Grinnell	0	–	3	–	0	1	–	4	–	1
$ – Conference champion

The 1919 Kansas State Farmers football team represented Kansas State Agricultural College in the 1919 college football season.

== Schedule ==
Date	Time	Opponent	Site	Result	Source
September 27		Baker*	Ahearn Field; Manhattan, KS	W 16–0	
October 4		Camp Funston*	Ahearn Field; Manhattan, KS	W 20–6	
October 11		Missouri	Ahearn Field; Manhattan, KS	T 6–6	
October 18	3:00 p.m.	at Washington University	Francis Field; St. Louis, MO	L 9–14	
October 24		Hays Teachers*	Ahearn Field; Manhattan, KS	W 12-0	
November 1		at Kansas	McCook Field; Lawrence, KS (rivalry)	L 3–16	
November 8		Haskell*	Ahearn Field; Manhattan, KS	L 3–7	
November 15		at Iowa State	State Field; Ames, IA (rivalry)	L 0–46	
November 22		Oklahoma*^{†}	Ahearn Field; Manhattan, KS	L 3–14	
*Non-conference game; ^{†}Homecoming; All times are in Central time
