= Edwin W. Lee =

American football player, coach, attorney, and judge (1875–1942)

Biographical details
- Born: July 1, 1875; Beloit, Wisconsin, U.S.
- Died: October 1, 1942 (aged 67); St. Louis, Missouri, U.S.

Playing career

Football
- 1893–1896: Williams
- Positions: Guard, tackle

Coaching career (HC unless noted)

Football
- 1898: Washington University
- 1898: Smith Academy (MO)
- 1900: Washington University
- 1901–1903: Smith Academy (MO) (assistant)
- 1905: Smith Academy (MO) (assistant)

Head coaching record
- Overall: 9–2–1 (college)

Edwin Waterman Lee (July 1, 1875 – October 1, 1942) was an American football player and coach, and then attorney and judge. Lee attended Smith Academy in St. Louis, Missouri and then starred at Williams College, playing guard and tackle. In addition to playing football at Williams, Lee was also a member of Chi Psi fraternity. Chi Psi offers the Edwin W. Lee Award, presented to a person who is not an initiated member of the Fraternity, for noteworthy assistance to the Fraternity, Trust, or Alpha.

== Coaching career ==
After college, Lee returned to St. Louis and enrolled in Washington University School of Law, graduating in 1899. Lee coached Washington University in St. Louis and his alma mater, Smith Academy, in 1898. He again coached Washington University in 1900. Lee then served as an assistant coach at Smith Academy from 1901 to 1903 and again in 1905.

In 1906, Lee served as chairman of the Missouri Athletic Club.

== Legal career ==
After earning his law degree from Washington University, he joined his father's former firm Watts & McKeighan, which later becomes Watts, Gentry, & Lee. Lee was an expert in taxation and probate, publishing a law review article in 1921. Also in 1921, his biographical sketch appears in the Centennial history of Missouri (the center state) one hundred years in the Union, 1820-1921. Lee founded his own firm in 1924 with an office in the Boatmen's Bank Building.

Lee was appointed as a Missouri Circuit Court judge by Governor Herbert S. Hadley to serve a month until November elections. Then, Lee won the election and served the shortened term until January 1911. Governor Hadley named William B. Homer back to the Circuit Court, and filled his position as Excise Commissioner with Judge Lee. Lee served as city excise commissioner from 1911 to 1913.

== Head coaching record ==
=== College ===
Year	Team	Overall	Conference	Standing	Bowl/playoffs
Washington University (Independent) (1898)
1898	Washington University	6–0			
Washington University (Independent) (1900)
1900	Washington University	3–2–1			
Washington University:		9–2–1			
Total:		9–2–1			
