= L. W. Boynton =

American college football player and coach (1877–1937)

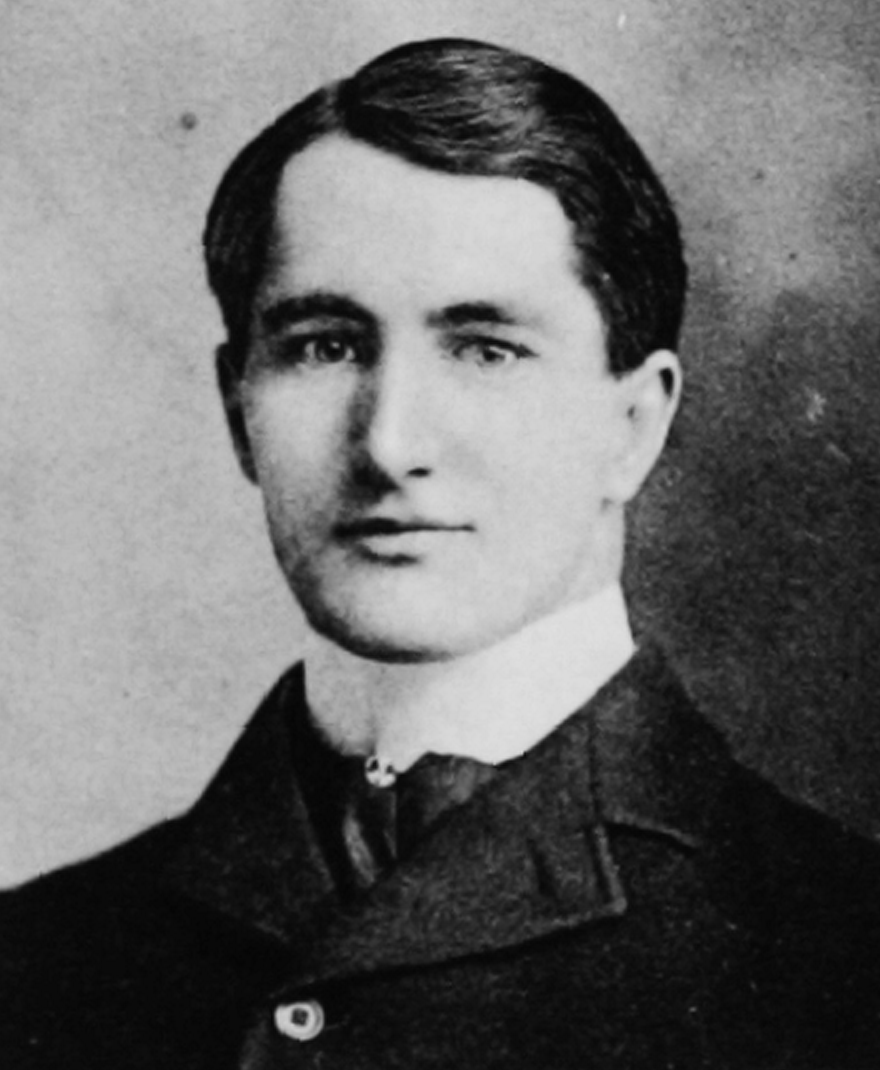
- Boynton pictured in The Class Book 1900, Cornell University

Biographical details
- Born: August 12, 1877; Whitney Point, New York, U.S.
- Died: June 19, 1937 (aged 59); Whitney Point, New York, U.S.
- Education: Cornell Law School

Playing career

Football
- 1897–1899: Cornell
- Position: Right tackle

Coaching career (HC unless noted)

Football
- 1900: Kansas
- 1902: Sewanee
- 1903–1904: Washington University

Basketball
- 1905–1906: Washington University

Head coaching record
- Overall: 17–18–4 (football); 1–3 (basketball)

Lawrence William Boynton (August 12, 1877 – June 19, 1937) was an American college football player, coach, track and field athlete, and lawyer. He served as the head football coach at the University of Kansas in 1900, at Sewanee: The University of the South in 1902, and at Washington University in St. Louis from 1903 to 1904, compiling a career college football coaching record of 17–18–4.

== Early life and college career ==
Boynton was born in Whitney Point, New York on August 12, 1877 to George G. and Eliza Ann (née Boatman) Boynton where he also grew up. He attended Cornell University from 1897 to 1900, graduating with a degree in law. While at Cornell he played on the varsity football team as well as the varsity track & field team. Boynton lettered in track & field in 1899 and 1900 primarily competing in the hammer throw. He had the seventh best throw in the nation in 1900 with a distance of 44.9m in a meet in Philadelphia, Pennsylvania.

== Coaching career ==
=== Kansas ===
Boynton became the head football coach at the University of Kansas the fall after he graduated from Cornell. He coached the 1900 Kansas Jayhawks football team to a record of 2–5–2 with wins over Ottawa University and the University of South Dakota and ties against Emporia State University and the Missouri Tigers.

== Later life and death ==
After he finished coaching at Kansas in 1900 he returned to New York state where Boynton married Grace G. Stanton on September 6, 1902, just 2 months before he would head off to coach at Sewanee. He later worked as a lawyer first in New York state starting in 1905 even though he had already passed the New York Bar exam in 1900, then in Florida for four years starting in 1926, and finally in North Carolina starting in 1929. Boynton died on June 19, 1937, at the home of his parents in Whitney Point, New York. He was buried back in his hometown of Whitney Point, New York in Riverside Cemetery.

== Head coaching record ==
=== Football ===
Year	Team	Overall	Conference	Standing	Bowl/playoffs
Kansas Jayhawks (Independent) (1900)
1900	Kansas	2–5–2			
Kansas:		2–5–2			
Sewanee Tigers (Southern Intercollegiate Athletic Association) (1902)
1902	Sewanee	7–2			
Sewanee:		7–2			
Washington University (Independent) (1903–1904)
1903	Washington University	4–4–2			
1904	Washington University	4–7			
Washington University:		8–11–2			
Total:		17–18–4			
