= 1919 Iowa State Cyclones football team =

American college football season

1919 Iowa State Cyclones football
- Conference: Missouri Valley Conference
- Record: 5–2–1 (3–1–1 MVC)
- Head coach: Charles Mayser (5th season)
- Captain: Gilbert Denfield
- Home stadium: State Field

1919 Missouri Valley Conference football standings
	Conf.					Overall
Team	W		L		T	W		L		T
Missouri $	4	–	0	–	1	5	–	1	–	2
Iowa State	3	–	1	–	1	5	–	2	–	1
Washington University	2	–	2	–	0	5	–	2	–	0
Drake	2	–	2	–	0	4	–	3	–	0
Kansas	1	–	1	–	1	3	–	2	–	3
Kansas State	0	–	3	–	1	3	–	5	–	1
Grinnell	0	–	3	–	0	1	–	4	–	1
$ – Conference champion

The 1919 Iowa State Cyclones football team represented Iowa State College of Agricultural and Mechanic Arts (later renamed Iowa State University) in the Missouri Valley Conference during the 1919 college football season. In their fifth and final season under head coach Charles Mayser, the Cyclones compiled a 5–2–1 record (3–1–1 against conference opponents), finished in second place in the conference, shut out six of eight opponents, and outscored opponents by a combined total of 73 to 20. They played their home games at State Field in Ames, Iowa. Gilbert Denfield was the team captain.

== Schedule ==
Date	Opponent	Site	Result	Source
October 4	Coe*	State Field; Ames, IA	W 3–0	
October 11	Grinnell	State Field; Ames, IA	W 7–0	
October 18	at Missouri	Rollins Field; Columbia, MO (rivalry)	L 0–10	
October 25	Kansas	State Field; Ames, IA	T 0–0	
November 1	at Nebraska*	Nebraska Field; Lincoln, NE (rivalry)	W 3–0	
November 15	Kansas State^{†}	State Field; Ames, IA (rivalry)	W 46–0	
November 22	at Iowa*	Iowa Field; Iowa City, IA (rivalry)	L 0–10	
November 27	at Drake	Drake Stadium; Des Moines, IA	W 14–0	
*Non-conference game; ^{†}Homecoming
