= 1900 Washington University football team =

American college football season

1900 Washington University football
- Conference: Independent
- Record: 3–2–1
- Head coach: Edwin W. Lee (2nd season)
- Home stadium: Pastime Park, League Park, Handlan's Park

1900 Midwestern college football independents records
	Conf.			Overall
Team	W	L	T	W		L		T
Central Michigan		–		1	–	0	–	0
Lake Forest		–		1	–	0	–	0
Haskell		–		9	–	1	–	0
North Dakota Agricultural		–		8	–	1	–	1
Ohio State		–		8	–	1	–	1
Nebraska		–		6	–	1	–	1
Beloit		–		7	–	1	–	2
Kirksville Osteopaths		–		7	–	2	–	1
Washburn		–		6	–	2	–	0
Wittenberg		–		5	–	2	–	1
Drake		–		6	–	3	–	0
Doane		–		2	–	1	–	0
Notre Dame		–		6	–	3	–	1
Fairmount		–		5	–	3	–	0
Detroit College		–		3	–	2	–	0
South Dakota Agricultural		–		3	–	2	–	0
Washington University		–		3	–	2	–	1
Carthage		–		4	–	3	–	0
Wabash		–		5	–	4	–	0
Lincoln (MO)		–		2	–	2	–	0
Missouri		–		4	–	4	–	1
Northern Illinois State		–		2	–	2	–	2
Iowa State Normal		–		3	–	4	–	1
Buchtel		–		2	–	3	–	1
Cincinnati		–		3	–	5	–	1
Ohio		–		2	–	4	–	1
Kansas State		–		2	–	4	–	0
Kansas		–		2	–	5	–	2
Ohio Wesleyan		–		2	–	5	–	2
Iowa State		–		2	–	5	–	1
Butler		–		0	–	1	–	3
Heidelberg		–		0	–	2	–	2
Chicago P&S		–		1	–	3	–	0
Mount Union		–		1	–	4	–	1
Miami (OH)		–		0	–	4	–	0

The 1900 Washington University football team represented Washington University in St. Louis as an independent during the 1900 college football season. Led by Edwin W. Lee in his second and final season as head coach, Washington University compiled a record of 3–2–1.

== Schedule ==
Date	Time	Opponent	Site	Result	Attendance	Source
October 6		Smith Academy	Pastime Park; St. Louis, MO	W 17–0		
October 13		vs. Saint Louis	Athletic Park; St. Louis, MO	W 28–0		
October 20		at McKendree	Lebanon, IL	cancelled		
October 27	3:00 p.m.	Missouri	League Park; St. Louis, MO	L 5–6	2,000	
November 10		at Missouri Mines	Rolla, MO	L 5–11		
November 17	3:00 p.m.	Barnes Medical College	Handlan's Park; St. Louis, MO	W 6–0		
November 29	2:30 p.m.	Christian Brothers (MO)	League Park; St. Louis, MO	T 6–6	5,000	
