= Karl Core =

American football player and coach (1875–1929)

Biographical details
- Born: December 4, 1875; Greensburg, Pennsylvania, U.S.
- Died: February 1, 1929 (aged 53); Washington, D.C., U.S.

Playing career
- 1897: Greensburg Athletic Association
- 1898–1899: Washington & Jefferson

Coaching career (HC unless noted)
- 1900: Ohio

Head coaching record
- Overall: 2–4–1

Karl Leopold William Core (December 4, 1875 – February 1, 1929) was an American football player and coach. He served as the head football coach at Ohio University in 1900, compiling a record of 2–4–1.

After retiring from football, he was a high-ranking official at the Pittsburgh Plate Glass Company.

== Head coaching record ==
Year	Team	Overall	Conference	Standing	Bowl/playoffs
Ohio Green and White (Independent) (1900)
1900	Ohio	2–4–1			
Ohio:		2–4–1			
Total:		2–4–1			
