= John F. Miller (American football) =

American sports coach and administrator (1890–1972)

Biographical details
- Born: May 27, 1890; Warrensburg, Missouri, U.S.
- Died: March 30, 1972 (aged 81); Raleigh, North Carolina, U.S.

Coaching career (HC unless noted)

Football
- 1919: Missouri
- 1921–1923: Albion

Basketball
- 1916–1917: Missouri
- 1918–1919: Missouri
- 1921–1923: Albion

Baseball
- 1918–1921: Missouri

Administrative career (AD unless noted)
- ?–1924: Albion
- 1924–1930: NC State
- 1937–1947: NC State

Head coaching record
- Overall: 23–7–4 (football); 34–19 (basketball); 30–16–1 (baseball)

Accomplishments and honors

Championships
- Football; 1 MVIAA (1919); 1 MIAA (1922)

John Fletcher Miller (May 27, 1890 – March 30, 1972) was an American football, basketball, and baseball coach and college athletics administrator.

== Playing career ==
Miller played football, basketball, and baseball at Warrensburg Teachers College—now known as the University of Central Missouri.

== Coaching career ==
Miller was the head football (1919), basketball (1916–1917, 1918–1919), and baseball (1918, 1920–1921) coach at the University of Missouri.

Miller was the head football coach at Albion College in Albion, Michigan. He held that position for three seasons, from 1921 until 1923. His coaching record at Albion was 18–6–2.

== Athletic director ==
Miller served as the athletic director at North Carolina State University in Raleigh, North Carolina.

== Death ==
Miller died on March 30, 1972, at Rex Hospital in Raleigh.

== Head coaching record ==
=== Football ===
Year	Team	Overall	Conference	Standing	Bowl/playoffs
Missouri Tigers (Missouri Valley Intercollegiate Athletic Association) (1919)
1919	Missouri	5–1–2	4–0–1	1st	
Missouri:		5–1–2	4–0–1		
Albion Methodists (Michigan Intercollegiate Athletic Association) (1921–1923)
1921	Albion	6–2	4–1	2nd	
1922	Albion	5–2–2	4–0–1	1st	
1923	Albion	7–2	4–1	2nd	
Albion:		18–6–2	12–2–1		
Total:		23–7–4			
National championship Conference title Conference division title or championship game berth
