= 1900 Miami Redskins football team =

American college football season

1900 Miami Redskins football
- Conference: Independent
- Record: 0–4
- Head coach: Alonzo Edwin Branch (1st season)
- Home stadium: Miami Field

1900 Midwestern college football independents records
	Conf.			Overall
Team	W	L	T	W		L		T
Central Michigan		–		1	–	0	–	0
Lake Forest		–		1	–	0	–	0
Haskell		–		9	–	1	–	0
North Dakota Agricultural		–		8	–	1	–	1
Ohio State		–		8	–	1	–	1
Nebraska		–		6	–	1	–	1
Beloit		–		7	–	1	–	2
Kirksville Osteopaths		–		7	–	2	–	1
Washburn		–		6	–	2	–	0
Wittenberg		–		5	–	2	–	1
Drake		–		6	–	3	–	0
Doane		–		2	–	1	–	0
Notre Dame		–		6	–	3	–	1
Fairmount		–		5	–	3	–	0
Detroit College		–		3	–	2	–	0
South Dakota Agricultural		–		3	–	2	–	0
Washington University		–		3	–	2	–	1
Carthage		–		4	–	3	–	0
Wabash		–		5	–	4	–	0
Lincoln (MO)		–		2	–	2	–	0
Missouri		–		4	–	4	–	1
Northern Illinois State		–		2	–	2	–	2
Iowa State Normal		–		3	–	4	–	1
Buchtel		–		2	–	3	–	1
Cincinnati		–		3	–	5	–	1
Ohio		–		2	–	4	–	1
Kansas State		–		2	–	4	–	0
Kansas		–		2	–	5	–	2
Ohio Wesleyan		–		2	–	5	–	2
Iowa State		–		2	–	5	–	1
Butler		–		0	–	1	–	3
Heidelberg		–		0	–	2	–	2
Chicago P&S		–		1	–	3	–	0
Mount Union		–		1	–	4	–	1
Miami (OH)		–		0	–	4	–	0

The 1900 Miami Redskins football team was an American football team that represented Miami University during the 1900 college football season. Under new head coach Alonzo Edwin Branch, Miami compiled a 0–4 record.

== Schedule ==
Date	Time	Opponent	Site	Result	Source
October 13		Earlham	Miami Field; Oxford, OH	L 0–11	
October 20		Centre	Miami Field; Oxford, OH	L 0–17	
October 27		at Wittenberg	Springfield, OH	L 0–33	
November 3	3:20 p.m.	at Cincinnati	Chester Park; Cincinnati, OH (Victory Bell)	L 12–16	

(Note: Miami does not record the games against Earlham or Centre in their media guide.)
