= 1919 Kansas Jayhawks football team =

American college football season

1919 Kansas Jayhawks football
- Conference: Missouri Valley Conference
- Record: 3–2–3 (1–1–1 MVC)
- Head coach: Leon McCarty (1st season)
- Captain: Howard Laslett
- Home stadium: McCook Field

1919 Missouri Valley Conference football standings
	Conf.					Overall
Team	W		L		T	W		L		T
Missouri $	4	–	0	–	1	5	–	1	–	2
Iowa State	3	–	1	–	1	5	–	2	–	1
Washington University	2	–	2	–	0	5	–	2	–	0
Drake	2	–	2	–	0	4	–	3	–	0
Kansas	1	–	1	–	1	3	–	2	–	3
Kansas State	0	–	3	–	1	3	–	5	–	1
Grinnell	0	–	3	–	0	1	–	4	–	1
$ – Conference champion

The 1919 Kansas Jayhawks football team was an American football team that represented the University of Kansas in the Missouri Valley Conference (MVC) during the 1919 college football season. In their first and only season under head coach Leon McCarty, the Jayhawks compiled a 3–2–3 record (1–1–1 against conference opponents), finished in fourth place in the MVC, and outscored opponents by a total of 85 to 35. They played their home games at McCook Field in Lawrence, Kansas. Howard Laslett was the team captain.

== Schedule ==
Date	Opponent	Site	Result	Attendance	Source
October 4	Pittsburg Normal*	McCook Field; Lawrence, KS	W 42–0		
October 11	Kansas State Normal*	McCook Field; Lawrence, KS	W 14–0		
October 18	at Washburn*	Topeka, KS	T 0–0		
October 25	at Iowa State	State Field; Ames, IA	T 0–0		
November 1	Kansas State	McCook Field; Lawrence, KS (rivalry)	W 16–3		
November 8	Oklahoma*	McCook Field; Lawrence, KS	T 0–0		
November 15	at Nebraska*	Nebraska Field; Lincoln, NE (rivalry)	L 7–19	8,000	
November 27	Missouri^{†}	McCook Field; Lawrence, KS (rivalry)	L 5–13	8,000	
*Non-conference game; ^{†}Homecoming
