= Arthur L. Tuttle =

American football player and coach

Biographical details
- Born: October 30, 1870; Salt Lake City, Utah, U.S.
- Died: January 23, 1957 (aged 86); Danville, Kentucky, U.S.

Playing career

Football
- 1888–1892: Washington University
- Positions: Quarterback, halfback, fullback

Coaching career (HC unless noted)

Football
- 1889–1892: Washington University

Head coaching record
- Overall: 10–3–1

Arthur Lemuel Tuttle (October 30, 1870 – January 23, 1957) was an American college football player and coach, and then mining engineer and executive. Tuttle was born in Salt Lake City, where his father, Daniel S. Tuttle, was missionary bishop of the territory of Montana, Utah, and Idaho. In addition to being the son of the eventual Presiding Bishop of the Episcopal Church, Tuttle was also great-grandson of Charles Tuttle, private in the 1st Connecticut Regiment (1775). Tuttle attended boarding school in the East at St. Paul's School in Concord, New Hampshire. In 1886, Daniel S. Tuttle was Bishop of the Diocese of Missouri. When he graduated from prep school, Arthur Tuttle enrolled at Washington University in St. Louis in 1888.

== Coaching career ==
Tuttle helped to introduce football to Washington University. Prior to his arrival, Captain John Bohn had led a university team in 1887 against a team from the University Club in St. Louis. In 1888, Tuttle is noted for his work alongside Captain Bohn defeating Smith Academy. Beginning in 1889, Tuttle was captain and "skilled coach" of the team. He regularly corresponded with his brother, Herbert, who played at Columbia University, in order to stay up-to-date on plays and methods. Tuttle led the "Myrtle and Maroon" eleven to a 28–0 victory against the Missouri Tigers for the Western Intercollegiate Football Championship in 1890 on Thanksgiving at Sportsman's Park.

== Head coaching record ==
Year	Team	Overall	Conference	Standing	Bowl/playoffs
Washington University (1889–1892)
1889	Washington University	1–0			
1890	Washington University	2–0			
1891	Washington University	4–1–1			
1892	Washington University	3–2			
Washington University:		10–3–1			
Total:		10–3–1			

== Engineering career ==
After earning his mining degree from Washington University, he became a mining instructor at his alma mater for the 1893–94 school year. Then, Tuttle accepted a mining engineering job in Mexico, rising to superintendent. He moved to Montana, then Missouri, and back to Mexico as the manager of several properties. Tuttle worked for the Guggenheim family as well as Adolph Lewisohn and family in Mexico and then consulted for the Lewisohns in New York City, after serving as the general manager for the Tennessee Copper Company in Copperhill, Tennessee. After several years in New York, Tuttle returned to Mexico as a mining executive for the Lewisohns and then he and his family moved to Danville, Kentucky, his wife's hometown, where he set up a practice, doing several projects in Central and South America. Tuttle became City Engineer in 1936 and again in 1941.
