= 1900 Notre Dame football team =

American college football season

1900 Notre Dame football
- Conference: Independent
- Record: 6–3–1
- Head coach: Pat O'Dea (1st season)
- Captain: John Farley
- Home stadium: Cartier Field

1900 Midwestern college football independents records
	Conf.			Overall
Team	W	L	T	W		L		T
Central Michigan		–		1	–	0	–	0
Lake Forest		–		1	–	0	–	0
Haskell		–		9	–	1	–	0
North Dakota Agricultural		–		8	–	1	–	1
Ohio State		–		8	–	1	–	1
Nebraska		–		6	–	1	–	1
Beloit		–		7	–	1	–	2
Kirksville Osteopaths		–		7	–	2	–	1
Washburn		–		6	–	2	–	0
Wittenberg		–		5	–	2	–	1
Drake		–		6	–	3	–	0
Doane		–		2	–	1	–	0
Notre Dame		–		6	–	3	–	1
Fairmount		–		5	–	3	–	0
Detroit College		–		3	–	2	–	0
South Dakota Agricultural		–		3	–	2	–	0
Washington University		–		3	–	2	–	1
Carthage		–		4	–	3	–	0
Wabash		–		5	–	4	–	0
Lincoln (MO)		–		2	–	2	–	0
Missouri		–		4	–	4	–	1
Northern Illinois State		–		2	–	2	–	2
Iowa State Normal		–		3	–	4	–	1
Buchtel		–		2	–	3	–	1
Cincinnati		–		3	–	5	–	1
Ohio		–		2	–	4	–	1
Kansas State		–		2	–	4	–	0
Kansas		–		2	–	5	–	2
Ohio Wesleyan		–		2	–	5	–	2
Iowa State		–		2	–	5	–	1
Butler		–		0	–	1	–	3
Heidelberg		–		0	–	2	–	2
Chicago P&S		–		1	–	3	–	0
Mount Union		–		1	–	4	–	1
Miami (OH)		–		0	–	4	–	0

The 1900 Notre Dame football team was an American football team that represented the University of Notre Dame in the 1900 college football season. In its first season with Pat O'Dea as coach, the team compiled a 6–3–1 record, shut out seven opponents, and outscored all opponents by a combined total of 261 to 73.

== Schedule ==
Date	Opponent	Site	Result	Source
September 29	Goshen High School	Cartier Field; Notre Dame, IN	W 55–0	
October 6	Englewood High School	Cartier Field; Notre Dame, IN	W 68–0	
October 13	Lake Forest	Cartier Field; Notre Dame, IN	Cancelled	
October 13	South Bend Howard Park Club	Cartier Field; Notre Dame, IN	W 64–0	
October 20	Cincinnati	Cartier Field; Notre Dame, IN	W 57–0	
October 25	at Indiana	Jordan Field; Bloomington, IN	L 0–6	
November 3	Beloit	Cartier Field; Notre Dame, IN	T 6–6	
November 10	at Wisconsin	Randall Field; Madison, WI	L 0–54	
November 17	at Michigan	Regents Field; Ann Arbor, MI (rivalry)	L 0–7	
November 24	Rush Medical	Cartier Field; Notre Dame, IN	W 5–0	
November 29	Purdue	Cartier Field; Notre Dame, IN	Cancelled	
November 29	Chicago Physicians and Surgeons	Cartier Field; Notre Dame, IN	W 5–0	
