= 1900 Cincinnati football team =

American college football season

1900 Cincinnati football
- Conference: Independent
- Record: 3–5–1
- Head coach: Daniel A. Reed (2nd season)
- Captain: Burt Charles
- Home stadium: Chester Park, League Park

1900 Midwestern college football independents records
	Conf.			Overall
Team	W	L	T	W		L		T
Central Michigan		–		1	–	0	–	0
Lake Forest		–		1	–	0	–	0
Haskell		–		9	–	1	–	0
North Dakota Agricultural		–		8	–	1	–	1
Ohio State		–		8	–	1	–	1
Nebraska		–		6	–	1	–	1
Beloit		–		7	–	1	–	2
Kirksville Osteopaths		–		7	–	2	–	1
Washburn		–		6	–	2	–	0
Wittenberg		–		5	–	2	–	1
Drake		–		6	–	3	–	0
Doane		–		2	–	1	–	0
Notre Dame		–		6	–	3	–	1
Fairmount		–		5	–	3	–	0
Detroit College		–		3	–	2	–	0
South Dakota Agricultural		–		3	–	2	–	0
Washington University		–		3	–	2	–	1
Carthage		–		4	–	3	–	0
Wabash		–		5	–	4	–	0
Lincoln (MO)		–		2	–	2	–	0
Missouri		–		4	–	4	–	1
Northern Illinois State		–		2	–	2	–	2
Iowa State Normal		–		3	–	4	–	1
Buchtel		–		2	–	3	–	1
Cincinnati		–		3	–	5	–	1
Ohio		–		2	–	4	–	1
Kansas State		–		2	–	4	–	0
Kansas		–		2	–	5	–	2
Ohio Wesleyan		–		2	–	5	–	2
Iowa State		–		2	–	5	–	1
Butler		–		0	–	1	–	3
Heidelberg		–		0	–	2	–	2
Chicago P&S		–		1	–	3	–	0
Mount Union		–		1	–	4	–	1
Miami (OH)		–		0	–	4	–	0

The 1900 Cincinnati football team was an American football team that represented the University of Cincinnati as an independent during the 1900 college football season. Led by Daniel A. Reed in his second and final season at head coach, Cincinnati compiled a 3–5–1 record. Burt Charles was the team captain. The team played home games at Chester Park and League Park in Cincinnati.

== Schedule ==
Date	Time	Opponent	Site	Result	Attendance	Source
September 29		Kentucky State College	Chester Park; Cincinnati, OH	W 20–6		
October 6		Avondale Athletic Club	League Park; Cincinnati, OH	L 0–10		
October 13	3:00 p.m.	Ohio State	Chester Park; Cincinnati, OH	L 0–29		
October 20		at Notre Dame	Cartier Field; Notre Dame, IN	L 0–57		
November 3	3:20 p.m.	Miami (OH)	Chester Park; Cincinnati, OH (Victory Bell)	W 16–12		
November 10		at Covington YMCA	Covington Ball Park; Covington, KY	W 15–10		
November 17		at Centre	Danville, KY	T 0–0		
November 24	3:15 p.m.	Haskell	Chester Park; Cincinnati, OH	L 0–16	300	
November 29		Marietta	Chester Park; Cincinnati, OH	L 0–25		
