= 1900 Drake Bulldogs football team =

American college football season

1900 Drake Bulldogs football
- Conference: Independent
- Record: 6–3
- Head coach: Charles Best (1st season)

1900 Midwestern college football independents records
	Conf.			Overall
Team	W	L	T	W		L		T
Central Michigan		–		1	–	0	–	0
Lake Forest		–		1	–	0	–	0
Haskell		–		9	–	1	–	0
North Dakota Agricultural		–		8	–	1	–	1
Ohio State		–		8	–	1	–	1
Nebraska		–		6	–	1	–	1
Beloit		–		7	–	1	–	2
Kirksville Osteopaths		–		7	–	2	–	1
Washburn		–		6	–	2	–	0
Wittenberg		–		5	–	2	–	1
Drake		–		6	–	3	–	0
Doane		–		2	–	1	–	0
Notre Dame		–		6	–	3	–	1
Fairmount		–		5	–	3	–	0
Detroit College		–		3	–	2	–	0
South Dakota Agricultural		–		3	–	2	–	0
Washington University		–		3	–	2	–	1
Carthage		–		4	–	3	–	0
Wabash		–		5	–	4	–	0
Lincoln (MO)		–		2	–	2	–	0
Missouri		–		4	–	4	–	1
Northern Illinois State		–		2	–	2	–	2
Iowa State Normal		–		3	–	4	–	1
Buchtel		–		2	–	3	–	1
Cincinnati		–		3	–	5	–	1
Ohio		–		2	–	4	–	1
Kansas State		–		2	–	4	–	0
Kansas		–		2	–	5	–	2
Ohio Wesleyan		–		2	–	5	–	2
Iowa State		–		2	–	5	–	1
Butler		–		0	–	1	–	3
Heidelberg		–		0	–	2	–	2
Chicago P&S		–		1	–	3	–	0
Mount Union		–		1	–	4	–	1
Miami (OH)		–		0	–	4	–	0

The 1900 Drake Bulldogs football team was an American football team that represented Drake University as an independent during the 1900 college football season. In its first season under head coach Charles Best, the team compiled a 6–3 record and outscored opponents by a total of 129 to 45.

== Schedule ==
Date	Opponent	Site	Result	Source
September 29	at Des Moines	Des Moines, IA	W 29–0	
October 4	Grinnell	Des Moines, IA	W 6–0	
October 13	Iowa State Normal	Des Moines, IA (rivalry)	W 50–0	
October 20	at Nebraska	Antelope Field; Lincoln, NE	L 0–8	
October 27	at Iowa	Iowa Field; Iowa City, IA	L 0–26	
November 3	at Simpson	Indianola, IA	W 6–5	
November 10	Iowa State	Des Moines, IA	W 16–0	
November 17	at Penn (IA)	Oskaloosa, IA	L 5–6	
November 24	Grinnell	Des Moines, IA	W 17–0	
