= 1900 North Dakota Agricultural Aggies football team =

American college football season

1900 North Dakota Agricultural Aggies football
- Conference: Independent
- Record: 8–1–1
- Head coach: Jack Harrison (1st season)
- Captain: T. F. Manns

1900 Midwestern college football independents records
	Conf.			Overall
Team	W	L	T	W		L		T
Central Michigan		–		1	–	0	–	0
Lake Forest		–		1	–	0	–	0
Haskell		–		9	–	1	–	0
North Dakota Agricultural		–		8	–	1	–	1
Ohio State		–		8	–	1	–	1
Nebraska		–		6	–	1	–	1
Beloit		–		7	–	1	–	2
Kirksville Osteopaths		–		7	–	2	–	1
Washburn		–		6	–	2	–	0
Wittenberg		–		5	–	2	–	1
Drake		–		6	–	3	–	0
Doane		–		2	–	1	–	0
Notre Dame		–		6	–	3	–	1
Fairmount		–		5	–	3	–	0
Detroit College		–		3	–	2	–	0
South Dakota Agricultural		–		3	–	2	–	0
Washington University		–		3	–	2	–	1
Carthage		–		4	–	3	–	0
Wabash		–		5	–	4	–	0
Lincoln (MO)		–		2	–	2	–	0
Missouri		–		4	–	4	–	1
Northern Illinois State		–		2	–	2	–	2
Iowa State Normal		–		3	–	4	–	1
Buchtel		–		2	–	3	–	1
Cincinnati		–		3	–	5	–	1
Ohio		–		2	–	4	–	1
Kansas State		–		2	–	4	–	0
Kansas		–		2	–	5	–	2
Ohio Wesleyan		–		2	–	5	–	2
Iowa State		–		2	–	5	–	1
Butler		–		0	–	1	–	3
Heidelberg		–		0	–	2	–	2
Chicago P&S		–		1	–	3	–	0
Mount Union		–		1	–	4	–	1
Miami (OH)		–		0	–	4	–	0

The 1900 North Dakota Agricultural Aggies football team was an American football team that represented North Dakota Agricultural College (now known as North Dakota State University) as an independent during the 1900 college football season. They played in 10 games and had a 8–1–1 record. It was their first season under new head coach Jack Harrison.

== Schedule ==
Date	Opponent	Site	Result
September 29	at Moorhead Normal	Moorhead, MN	W 19–0
October 9	Third State Normal	Fargo, ND	W 30–11
October 13	Alexandria Athletic Club	Fargo, ND	W 18–0
October 20	Saint Paul Central High School	Fargo, ND	W 12–11
October 27	at Fergus Falls Athletic Club	Fergus Falls, MN	W 11–5
October 30	Dakota Wesleyan	Aberdeen, SD	T 6–6
November 3	at Hamline	Saint Paul, MN	L 11–18
November 10	at Fargo	Fargo, ND	W 40–0
November 13	Malacester	Fargo, ND	W 22–5
November 19	North Dakota	Fargo, ND (rivalry)	W 16–0
