= Leon McCarty =

American football and baseball coach (1888–1962)

Biographical details
- Born: June 20, 1888; Columbus, Ohio, U.S.
- Died: September 18, 1962 (aged 74); Chillicothe, Ohio, U.S.

Playing career

Football
- 1908–1909: Ohio State

Coaching career (HC unless noted)

Football
- 1919: Kansas

Baseball
- 1914–1917: Kansas
- 1920: Kansas

Head coaching record
- Overall: 3–2–3 (football); 37–21–1 (baseball)

Leon Bumbarger McCarty (June 20, 1888 – September 18, 1962) was an American football and baseball coach. He was the 17th head football coach at the University of Kansas, serving for one season, in 1919, and compiling a record of 3–2–3. McCarty also was head baseball coach at Kansas from 1914 to 1917 and in 1920, tallying a record of 37–21–1 and winning Missouri Valley Conference championships in 1914 and 1915.

McCarty was a 1910 graduate of Ohio State University, where he lettered in football in 1908 and 1909.

== Head coaching record ==
=== Football ===
Year	Team	Overall	Conference	Standing	Bowl/playoffs
Kansas Jayhawks (Missouri Valley Intercollegiate Athletic Association) (1919)
1919	Kansas	3–2–3	1–1–1	T–3rd	
Kansas:		3–2–3	1–1–1		
Total:		3–2–3			
