= 1900 Lincoln Tigers football team =

American college football season

1900 Lincoln Tigers football
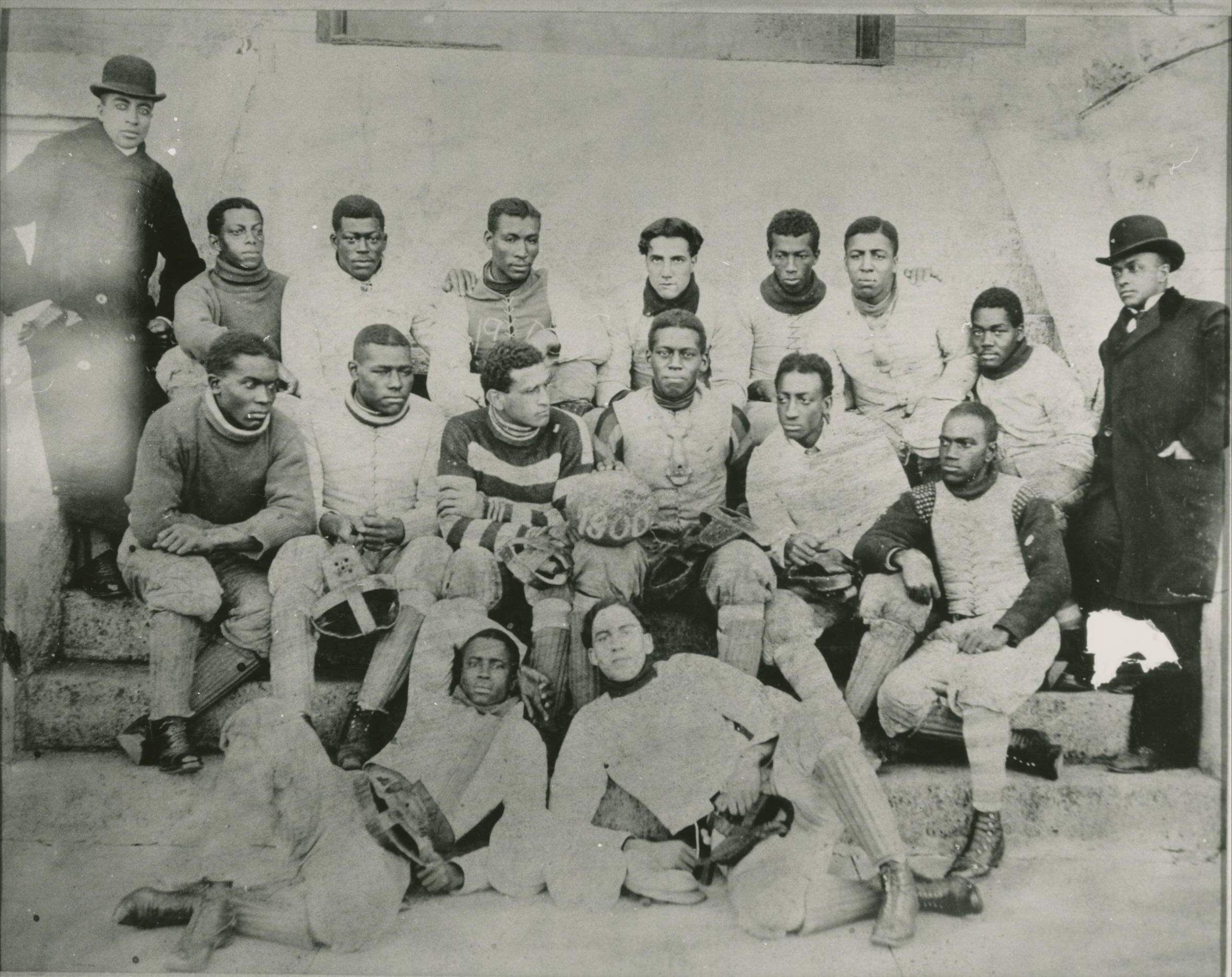
- Conference: Independent
- Record: 2–2
- Head coach: John W. Damel (1st season)
- Captain: Romeo West
- Home stadium: Cottage Place Park

1900 Midwestern college football independents records
	Conf.			Overall
Team	W	L	T	W		L		T
Central Michigan		–		1	–	0	–	0
Lake Forest		–		1	–	0	–	0
Haskell		–		9	–	1	–	0
North Dakota Agricultural		–		8	–	1	–	1
Ohio State		–		8	–	1	–	1
Nebraska		–		6	–	1	–	1
Beloit		–		7	–	1	–	2
Kirksville Osteopaths		–		7	–	2	–	1
Washburn		–		6	–	2	–	0
Wittenberg		–		5	–	2	–	1
Drake		–		6	–	3	–	0
Doane		–		2	–	1	–	0
Notre Dame		–		6	–	3	–	1
Fairmount		–		5	–	3	–	0
Detroit College		–		3	–	2	–	0
South Dakota Agricultural		–		3	–	2	–	0
Washington University		–		3	–	2	–	1
Carthage		–		4	–	3	–	0
Wabash		–		5	–	4	–	0
Lincoln (MO)		–		2	–	2	–	0
Missouri		–		4	–	4	–	1
Northern Illinois State		–		2	–	2	–	2
Iowa State Normal		–		3	–	4	–	1
Buchtel		–		2	–	3	–	1
Cincinnati		–		3	–	5	–	1
Ohio		–		2	–	4	–	1
Kansas State		–		2	–	4	–	0
Kansas		–		2	–	5	–	2
Ohio Wesleyan		–		2	–	5	–	2
Iowa State		–		2	–	5	–	1
Butler		–		0	–	1	–	3
Heidelberg		–		0	–	2	–	2
Chicago P&S		–		1	–	3	–	0
Mount Union		–		1	–	4	–	1
Miami (OH)		–		0	–	4	–	0

The 1900 Lincoln Tigers football team represented Lincoln Institute—now known as Lincoln University—in Jefferson City, Missouri as an independent during the 1900 college football season. Led by head coach John W. Damel, the Tigers compiled a record of 2–2. Lincoln beat the rival George R. Smith Deweys for the third year in a row. Notably, Lincoln also played Fisk University, who would become one of the HBCU rivals of the Tigers. They faced off in the Black college football national championship game, with Lincoln coming out on the losing end. Romeo West, who later was a professor and football coach at Lincoln, served as captain of the team.

There were also accusations of Lincoln football players being involved in an election scandal in 1900, although the truth of these accusations remains speculative due to lack of details. The accused players allegedly cast illegal votes for the Republican candidate for coroner.

== Schedule ==
Date	Time	Opponent	Site	Result	Attendance	Source
October 16		at Black Tigers	Columbia, MO	L 2–5		
October 17		at Sumner High School	Kemper Military School gridiron; Boonville, MO	W 10–7 (or 11–7)	300	
November 24		George R. Smith	Cottage Place Park; Jefferson, City, MO	W 11–6 (or L 5–6)		
November 29	3:00 p.m.	vs. Fisk	Handlan's Park; St. Louis, MO	L 6–16		

== Roster ==
Name	Position
Romeo West	Captain - Right HB
Logan	Left HB
Smith	Left HB
Spencer	FB
Mosley / Moseley	FB/Right End
Basket(t)	QB
Bias	C
Douthitt	LG/RT
Brown	LG
Neff	RG
Spann	LT
Hamilton	LT
Watts	RT
Henderson	Left End
Moore	Right End
