= 1900 Kirksville Osteopaths football team =

American college football season

1900 Kirksville Osteopaths football
- Conference: Independent
- Record: 7–2–1
- Head coach: Ernest C. White (1st season)
- Captain: Pettit

1900 Midwestern college football independents records
	Conf.			Overall
Team	W	L	T	W		L		T
Central Michigan		–		1	–	0	–	0
Lake Forest		–		1	–	0	–	0
Haskell		–		9	–	1	–	0
North Dakota Agricultural		–		8	–	1	–	1
Ohio State		–		8	–	1	–	1
Nebraska		–		6	–	1	–	1
Beloit		–		7	–	1	–	2
Kirksville Osteopaths		–		7	–	2	–	1
Washburn		–		6	–	2	–	0
Wittenberg		–		5	–	2	–	1
Drake		–		6	–	3	–	0
Doane		–		2	–	1	–	0
Notre Dame		–		6	–	3	–	1
Fairmount		–		5	–	3	–	0
Detroit College		–		3	–	2	–	0
South Dakota Agricultural		–		3	–	2	–	0
Washington University		–		3	–	2	–	1
Carthage		–		4	–	3	–	0
Wabash		–		5	–	4	–	0
Lincoln (MO)		–		2	–	2	–	0
Missouri		–		4	–	4	–	1
Northern Illinois State		–		2	–	2	–	2
Iowa State Normal		–		3	–	4	–	1
Buchtel		–		2	–	3	–	1
Cincinnati		–		3	–	5	–	1
Ohio		–		2	–	4	–	1
Kansas State		–		2	–	4	–	0
Kansas		–		2	–	5	–	2
Ohio Wesleyan		–		2	–	5	–	2
Iowa State		–		2	–	5	–	1
Butler		–		0	–	1	–	3
Heidelberg		–		0	–	2	–	2
Chicago P&S		–		1	–	3	–	0
Mount Union		–		1	–	4	–	1
Miami (OH)		–		0	–	4	–	0

The 1900 Kirksville Osteopaths football team was an American football team that represented the American School of Osteopathy—now known as A.T. Still University—as an independent during the 1900 college football season. Led by first-year head coach Ernest C. White, the team compiled a record 7–2–1.

== Schedule ==
Date	Opponent	Site	Result	Source
October 1	at Missouri	Rollins Field; Columbia, MO	L 0–13	
October	Centerville AC		W 75–0	
October 15	Still College		L 0–12	
October 22	Keokuk Medical College	Kirksville, MO	W 18–0	
October 27	Christian Brothers (MO)	Kirksville, MO	W 11–6	
November 5	vs. Central (MO	Moberly, MO	W 61–0	
November 10	Keokuk Medical College	Kirksville, MO	T 5–5	
November 19	Kirksville Normal		W 29–0	
November 24	at Gem City Business College	Quincy, IL	W 16–6	
November 29	Missouri Mines	Kirksville, MO	W 5–0	
