= 1900 Kansas State Aggies football team =

American college football season

1900 Kansas State Aggies football
- Conference: Independent
- Record: 2–4
- Head coach: Fay Moulton (1st season)
- Home stadium: Athletic Park

1900 Midwestern college football independents records
	Conf.			Overall
Team	W	L	T	W		L		T
Central Michigan		–		1	–	0	–	0
Lake Forest		–		1	–	0	–	0
Haskell		–		9	–	1	–	0
North Dakota Agricultural		–		8	–	1	–	1
Ohio State		–		8	–	1	–	1
Nebraska		–		6	–	1	–	1
Beloit		–		7	–	1	–	2
Kirksville Osteopaths		–		7	–	2	–	1
Washburn		–		6	–	2	–	0
Wittenberg		–		5	–	2	–	1
Drake		–		6	–	3	–	0
Doane		–		2	–	1	–	0
Notre Dame		–		6	–	3	–	1
Fairmount		–		5	–	3	–	0
Detroit College		–		3	–	2	–	0
South Dakota Agricultural		–		3	–	2	–	0
Washington University		–		3	–	2	–	1
Carthage		–		4	–	3	–	0
Wabash		–		5	–	4	–	0
Lincoln (MO)		–		2	–	2	–	0
Missouri		–		4	–	4	–	1
Northern Illinois State		–		2	–	2	–	2
Iowa State Normal		–		3	–	4	–	1
Buchtel		–		2	–	3	–	1
Cincinnati		–		3	–	5	–	1
Ohio		–		2	–	4	–	1
Kansas State		–		2	–	4	–	0
Kansas		–		2	–	5	–	2
Ohio Wesleyan		–		2	–	5	–	2
Iowa State		–		2	–	5	–	1
Butler		–		0	–	1	–	3
Heidelberg		–		0	–	2	–	2
Chicago P&S		–		1	–	3	–	0
Mount Union		–		1	–	4	–	1
Miami (OH)		–		0	–	4	–	0

The 1900 Kansas State Aggies football team represented Kansas State Agricultural College—now known as Kansas State University—as an independent during the 1900 college football season. Led by Fay Moulton in his first and only season as head coach, the Aggies compiled a record of 2–4.

== Schedule ==
Date	Time	Opponent	Site	Result	Source
October 22		at Fairmount	Wichita, KS	W 11–5	
October 26		at Kansas State Normal	Emporia, KS	L 0–28	
October 29		Ottawa	Manhattan, KS	L 0–28	
November 10	3:30 p.m.	Kansas State Normal	Athletic Park; Manhattan, KS	L 0–11	
November 17	3:45 p.m.	Kansas Wesleyan	Athletic Park; Manhattan, KS	W 30–0	
November 30		at Saint Mary (KS)	Leavenworth, KS	L 6–28	
