= 1900 Ohio Green and White football team =

American college football season

1900 Ohio Green and White football
- Conference: Independent
- Record: 2–4–1
- Head coach: Karl Core (1st season)

1900 Midwestern college football independents records
	Conf.			Overall
Team	W	L	T	W		L		T
Central Michigan		–		1	–	0	–	0
Lake Forest		–		1	–	0	–	0
Haskell		–		9	–	1	–	0
North Dakota Agricultural		–		8	–	1	–	1
Ohio State		–		8	–	1	–	1
Nebraska		–		6	–	1	–	1
Beloit		–		7	–	1	–	2
Kirksville Osteopaths		–		7	–	2	–	1
Washburn		–		6	–	2	–	0
Wittenberg		–		5	–	2	–	1
Drake		–		6	–	3	–	0
Doane		–		2	–	1	–	0
Notre Dame		–		6	–	3	–	1
Fairmount		–		5	–	3	–	0
Detroit College		–		3	–	2	–	0
South Dakota Agricultural		–		3	–	2	–	0
Washington University		–		3	–	2	–	1
Carthage		–		4	–	3	–	0
Wabash		–		5	–	4	–	0
Lincoln (MO)		–		2	–	2	–	0
Missouri		–		4	–	4	–	1
Northern Illinois State		–		2	–	2	–	2
Iowa State Normal		–		3	–	4	–	1
Buchtel		–		2	–	3	–	1
Cincinnati		–		3	–	5	–	1
Ohio		–		2	–	4	–	1
Kansas State		–		2	–	4	–	0
Kansas		–		2	–	5	–	2
Ohio Wesleyan		–		2	–	5	–	2
Iowa State		–		2	–	5	–	1
Butler		–		0	–	1	–	3
Heidelberg		–		0	–	2	–	2
Chicago P&S		–		1	–	3	–	0
Mount Union		–		1	–	4	–	1
Miami (OH)		–		0	–	4	–	0

The 1900 Ohio Green and White football team was an American football team that represented Ohio University as an independent during the 1900 college football season. Led by Karl Core in his first and only season as a head coach, the team compiled a record of 2–4–1. Five of their seven games were shutouts.

== Schedule ==
Date	Time	Opponent	Site	Result	Source
		Parkersburg AC		L 0–5	
October 6		Ohio State	Ohio Field; Columbus, OH	L 0–20	
		Otterbein		W 12–0	
		Ohio Wesleyan		W 17–0	
November 10	2:30 p.m.	at Washington & Jefferson	Washington, PA	L 0–49	
		Wittenberg		T 5–5	
		Ohio Wesleyan		L 5–6	
