= 1900 Northern Illinois State Normal football team =

American college football season

1900 Northern Illinois State Normal football
- Conference: Independent
- Record: 2–2–2
- Head coach: John A. H. Keith (2nd season)

1900 Midwestern college football independents records
	Conf.			Overall
Team	W	L	T	W		L		T
Central Michigan		–		1	–	0	–	0
Lake Forest		–		1	–	0	–	0
Haskell		–		9	–	1	–	0
North Dakota Agricultural		–		8	–	1	–	1
Ohio State		–		8	–	1	–	1
Nebraska		–		6	–	1	–	1
Beloit		–		7	–	1	–	2
Kirksville Osteopaths		–		7	–	2	–	1
Washburn		–		6	–	2	–	0
Wittenberg		–		5	–	2	–	1
Drake		–		6	–	3	–	0
Doane		–		2	–	1	–	0
Notre Dame		–		6	–	3	–	1
Fairmount		–		5	–	3	–	0
Detroit College		–		3	–	2	–	0
South Dakota Agricultural		–		3	–	2	–	0
Washington University		–		3	–	2	–	1
Carthage		–		4	–	3	–	0
Wabash		–		5	–	4	–	0
Lincoln (MO)		–		2	–	2	–	0
Missouri		–		4	–	4	–	1
Northern Illinois State		–		2	–	2	–	2
Iowa State Normal		–		3	–	4	–	1
Buchtel		–		2	–	3	–	1
Cincinnati		–		3	–	5	–	1
Ohio		–		2	–	4	–	1
Kansas State		–		2	–	4	–	0
Kansas		–		2	–	5	–	2
Ohio Wesleyan		–		2	–	5	–	2
Iowa State		–		2	–	5	–	1
Butler		–		0	–	1	–	3
Heidelberg		–		0	–	2	–	2
Chicago P&S		–		1	–	3	–	0
Mount Union		–		1	–	4	–	1
Miami (OH)		–		0	–	4	–	0

The 1900 Northern Illinois State Normal football team represented Northern Illinois State Normal College as an independent in the 1900 college football season. They were led by second-year head coach John A. H. Keith. The team finished the season with a 2–2–2 record.

== Schedule ==
Date	Opponent	Site	Result	Source
October 6	DeKalb High School	DeKalb, IL	T 5–5	
October 15	Fort Sheridan Company A	DeKalb, IL	W 23–13	
October 20	DeKalb High School	DeKalb, IL	T 0–0	
October 26	at East Aurora High School	Aurora, IL	L 5–17	
November 3	Elgin Athletic Association	DeKalb, IL	L 0–16	
November 29	Sandwich High School	Sandwich, IL	W 17–0	
