= 1900 Ohio State Buckeyes football team =

American college football season

1900 Ohio State Buckeyes football
- Conference: Independent
- Record: 8–1–1
- Head coach: John B. Eckstorm (2nd season)
- Home stadium: Ohio Field

1900 Midwestern college football independents records
	Conf.			Overall
Team	W	L	T	W		L		T
Central Michigan		–		1	–	0	–	0
Lake Forest		–		1	–	0	–	0
Haskell		–		9	–	1	–	0
North Dakota Agricultural		–		8	–	1	–	1
Ohio State		–		8	–	1	–	1
Nebraska		–		6	–	1	–	1
Beloit		–		7	–	1	–	2
Kirksville Osteopaths		–		7	–	2	–	1
Washburn		–		6	–	2	–	0
Wittenberg		–		5	–	2	–	1
Drake		–		6	–	3	–	0
Doane		–		2	–	1	–	0
Notre Dame		–		6	–	3	–	1
Fairmount		–		5	–	3	–	0
Detroit College		–		3	–	2	–	0
South Dakota Agricultural		–		3	–	2	–	0
Washington University		–		3	–	2	–	1
Carthage		–		4	–	3	–	0
Wabash		–		5	–	4	–	0
Lincoln (MO)		–		2	–	2	–	0
Missouri		–		4	–	4	–	1
Northern Illinois State		–		2	–	2	–	2
Iowa State Normal		–		3	–	4	–	1
Buchtel		–		2	–	3	–	1
Cincinnati		–		3	–	5	–	1
Ohio		–		2	–	4	–	1
Kansas State		–		2	–	4	–	0
Kansas		–		2	–	5	–	2
Ohio Wesleyan		–		2	–	5	–	2
Iowa State		–		2	–	5	–	1
Butler		–		0	–	1	–	3
Heidelberg		–		0	–	2	–	2
Chicago P&S		–		1	–	3	–	0
Mount Union		–		1	–	4	–	1
Miami (OH)		–		0	–	4	–	0

The 1900 Ohio State Buckeyes football team represented the Ohio State University in the 1900 college football season.

== Schedule ==
Date	Time	Opponent	Site	Result	Attendance	Source
September 29		Otterbein	Ohio Field; Columbus, OH	W 20–0		
October 6		Ohio	Ohio Field; Columbus, OH	W 20–0		
October 13	3:00 p.m.	at Cincinnati	Chester Park; Cincinnati, OH	W 29–0		
October 20		Ohio Wesleyan	Ohio Field; Columbus, OH	W 47–0		
October 27		Oberlin	Ohio Field; Columbus, OH	W 17–0		
November 3		West Virginia	Ohio Field; Columbus, OH	W 27–0		
November 10		Case	Ohio Field; Columbus, OH	W 24–10		
November 17		Ohio Medical	Ohio Field; Columbus, OH	L 6–11		
November 24		Michigan	Regents Field; Ann Arbor, MI (rivalry)	T 0–0	3,000	
November 29		Kenyon	Ohio Field; Columbus, OH	W 23–5		
