= 1900 Beloit football team =

American college football season

1900 Beloit football
- Conference: Independent
- Record: 7–1–2
- Head coach: John W. Hollister (5th season)

1900 Midwestern college football independents records
	Conf.			Overall
Team	W	L	T	W		L		T
Central Michigan		–		1	–	0	–	0
Lake Forest		–		1	–	0	–	0
Haskell		–		9	–	1	–	0
North Dakota Agricultural		–		8	–	1	–	1
Ohio State		–		8	–	1	–	1
Nebraska		–		6	–	1	–	1
Beloit		–		7	–	1	–	2
Kirksville Osteopaths		–		7	–	2	–	1
Washburn		–		6	–	2	–	0
Wittenberg		–		5	–	2	–	1
Drake		–		6	–	3	–	0
Doane		–		2	–	1	–	0
Notre Dame		–		6	–	3	–	1
Fairmount		–		5	–	3	–	0
Detroit College		–		3	–	2	–	0
South Dakota Agricultural		–		3	–	2	–	0
Washington University		–		3	–	2	–	1
Carthage		–		4	–	3	–	0
Wabash		–		5	–	4	–	0
Lincoln (MO)		–		2	–	2	–	0
Missouri		–		4	–	4	–	1
Northern Illinois State		–		2	–	2	–	2
Iowa State Normal		–		3	–	4	–	1
Buchtel		–		2	–	3	–	1
Cincinnati		–		3	–	5	–	1
Ohio		–		2	–	4	–	1
Kansas State		–		2	–	4	–	0
Kansas		–		2	–	5	–	2
Ohio Wesleyan		–		2	–	5	–	2
Iowa State		–		2	–	5	–	1
Butler		–		0	–	1	–	3
Heidelberg		–		0	–	2	–	2
Chicago P&S		–		1	–	3	–	0
Mount Union		–		1	–	4	–	1
Miami (OH)		–		0	–	4	–	0

The 1900 Beloit football team was an American football team that represented Beloit College in the 1900 college football season. In John W. Hollister's 5th year as head coach, Beloit compiled a 7–1–2 record, and outscored their opponents 253 to 23.

== Schedule ==
Date	Opponent	Site	Result	Source
September 21	at Whitewater State	Walworth County Fairgrounds; Elkhorn, WI	W 23–0	
October 6	Campion High School (WI)	Beloit, WI	W 48–0	
October 10	Ripon	Beloit, WI	W 78–0	
October 13	vs. Wisconsin	Milwaukee, WI	L 0–11	
October 20	Lawrence	Beloit, WI	W 26–0	
October 27	at Northwestern	Sheppard Field; Evanston, IL	T 6–6	
November 3	at Notre Dame	Cartier Field; Notre Dame, IN	T 6–6	
November 10	at Dixon	Driving Park in Pleasure Park; Dixon, IL	W 17–0	
November 17	at Cornell (IA)	Mount Vernon, IA	W 6–0	
November 29	Knox	Beloit, WI	W 43–0	
