= Chauncey Archiquette =

American athlete (1877–1949)

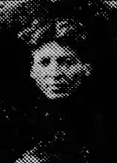
- Archiquette in 1905

Biographical details
- Born: November 17, 1877; Oneida Reservation, Wisconsin, U.S.
- Died: March 12, 1949 (aged 71); Pawhuska, Oklahoma, U.S.

Playing career

Football
- 1897–1899: Carlisle
- 1900–1904: Haskell
- 1905: Carlisle

Baseball
- 1896–1899?: Carlisle
- 1900?–1904?: Haskell
- 1904: Kansas City
- 1904: Leavenworth Valley
- 1904: Topeka
- 1905–?: Nebraska Indians
- 1906: Carlisle

Basketball
- 1897–1900?: Carlisle
- 1900?–1905?: Haskell
- 1905–1906: Carlisle
- Positions: Halfback / fullback / end (football); Left fielder / catcher (baseball); Guard (basketball)

Coaching career (HC unless noted)

Basketball
- 1900s: Haskell

Accomplishments and honors

Awards
- Football: All-Kansas (1901); All-Missouri Valley (1904)

Chauncey Edward Archiquette (November 17, 1877 – March 12, 1949) was an American athlete. A member of the Oneida people, he played several sports while attending Carlisle Indian Industrial School and then Haskell Institute. He later played for several barnstorming teams and coached at Haskell. While attending Haskell, Archiquette captained the football team and was the idol of a young Jim Thorpe, a Native American who went on to be considered one of the greatest athletes of all time.

== Early life ==
Archiquette, a member of the Oneida people, was born on November 17, 1877, on the Oneida Reservation in northeast Wisconsin; although one source stated his birth date to be April 17, 1878. His father, John, was the captain of the Oneida Indian police force. He enrolled at the Carlisle Indian Industrial School in Carlisle, Pennsylvania, on September 21, 1890.

== College career ==
=== Carlisle ===
In 1896, Archiquette made his first varsity sports team at Carlisle, playing left fielder for the baseball team. He later made the Carlisle football and basketball teams in 1897. In his first year with the football team, he appeared at end and was identified by The Inter Ocean as 151 pounds (68 kg), 68.2 inches (5.68 ft), and as being "a harnessmaker by trade. He plays right end and is one of the cleverest men on the eleven." The 1897 Carlisle football team finished with a record of 6–4.

Archiquette remained with the Carlisle sports teams in 1898, helping the football team to another 6–4 record. He was a member of head coach Pop Warner's 9–2 football team in 1899 that was ranked among the top teams in the country. He graduated from Carlisle in 1899.

=== Haskell ===
After Archiquette graduated from Carlisle, he enrolled at Haskell Institute in Kansas. He continued his collegiate sports career there, as there was no governing organization at the time, and thus no eligibility limits as there are in modern times.

Archiquette played catcher for the baseball team and also played as an end for the football team and with the basketball team. With the baseball team, he was their leading hitter. He was captain and star of the football team that had nine wins, including a shutout victory over the University of Missouri. He saw action as an end, halfback and fullback for Haskell, also being a standout placekicker. An obituary in Tulsa World described him as being:

quick as a flash on the gridiron ... He was a halfback and received considerable recognition for his ability in slipping away from enemy tacklers by employing a spinning motion that made him almost impossible to hold. Included in his football repertoire was a dead aim for the crossbar when he was on the business end of a placekick. His ability at field goals was considered exceptional, even during a time when great kickers were more of a rule than the exception.

Archiquette was noted in the book Carlisle Vs. Army to be "a fullback who weighed more than two hundred pounds (Note: This is disputed by his Tulsa World obituary, which listed him at 160 pounds.) and had astonishing speed for his size. When Archiquette had the ball in his arms, tacklers bounced off him as if he were a brick wall." Although unverified, the Tulsa World claimed that he was once selected to Walter Camp's All-America team.

Archiquette has been noted for the impact he had on a young Jim Thorpe during the 1900 season. Thorpe, a Native American who went on to be one of the greatest athletes in history, often watched Archiquette at practice and later said that "[he] was my football idol and in our scrub games with the homemade football I always tried to emulate him." The book Carlisle Vs. Army stated that Thorpe, after watching practice:

raced back and forth over the empty field, zigging here, zagging there, trying to emulate his idol. Eventually Archiquette noticed this lone little boy. Thorpe was eleven years old and not even five feet tall or one hundred pounds. When Archiquette talked to Jim, he was shocked at how much the youngster knew about the game, its nuances and strategies ... Archiquette asked Thorpe if he'd like to have a football of his own. Thorpe nodded his head excitedly, so Archiquette led him to the harness shop and sewed some leather scraps together. He stuffed the makeshift ball with rags and handed it over to a grinning Thorpe, who couldn't take his eyes off his new prize.

In addition to his football talents, Archiquette was also considered a top basketball player. James Naismith, the founder of the sport, once cited Archiquette as one of his favorite guards. He was noted for his "beautiful passing" at Carlisle and gained more attention during his time at Haskell. He was known for his "strong arm and keen accuracy"; in one game against the Kansas YMCA, he was reported to have made two shots from underneath the opposing basket across the entire court. Naismith described Archiquette as being outstanding on defense as well. He later noted of "How well I remember his superb guarding! To me this player, named Archiquette, had embodied all the requirements for a perfect guard." In one game during the 1900–01 season, Archiquette performed what biographer Rob Raines called the first known instance of a player using the zone defense.

In the 1901 football season, Archiquette remained captain and led the team to a record of 6–2, being named to the All-Kansas team at the end of the year as an end. He was succeeded as team captain in 1902 but remained with the team as a right halfback, for a squad that compiled a record of 8–2–1 under John H. Outland. He returned for the 1903 season, with the Lawrence Daily World reporting that he had "played with the Indians for so long that they can hardly get together in a game without him." He played another season for Haskell in 1904 and was named to one writer's All-Missouri Valley team. That year, he participated in Haskell's two games at Francis Olympic Field, as part of the demonstration event of American football at the 1904 Summer Olympics.

=== Return to Carlisle ===
Archiquette left Haskell in April 1905. He then returned to Carlisle, receiving a job as an assistant clerk. He also tried out for the football team and made the squad, helping them compile a record of 10–4 that year. The Gazette of York, Pennsylvania, described him as "one of the best half backs in the college ranks." After the football season, he tried out for the basketball team and was named the captain. He also played for the 1906 Carlisle baseball team.

== Later life ==
Archiquette signed a professional baseball contract with a Kansas City team in February 1904. By May, he was playing for the "Leavenworth Valley league team," and by July, he was with a team in Topeka. After leaving Haskell in 1905, he joined Green's Nebraska Indians, an all-star barnstorming baseball team, where he played for several years. He also umpired some of Haskell's football games after his college playing career ended. He briefly was a coach for the Haskell basketball team, implementing some of the zone defense techniques he pioneered.

After two years as a clerk at Carlisle, Archiquette was transferred in 1906 to the Osage Indian Agency and settled in Pawhuska, Oklahoma. He was part of a musical quartet that performed in Pawhuska, to the "supreme gratification" of citizens. He retired from the agency in 1942.

Archiquette married Rhoda Scott in 1923; she died in 1930. He had two stepchildren. He was a member of the Episcopal church, the Elks Lodge and the Masonic Lodge. He died on March 12, 1949, in Pawhuska, at the age of 71. His obituary in the Tulsa World described him as "one of the country's most outstanding athletes near the turn of the century."
