= 1900 Iowa State Cyclones football team =

American college football season

1900 Iowa State Cyclones football
- Conference: Independent
- Record: 2–5–1
- Head coach: C. E. Woodruff (1st season)
- Captain: L. M. Chambers

1900 Midwestern college football independents records
	Conf.			Overall
Team	W	L	T	W		L		T
Central Michigan		–		1	–	0	–	0
Lake Forest		–		1	–	0	–	0
Haskell		–		9	–	1	–	0
North Dakota Agricultural		–		8	–	1	–	1
Ohio State		–		8	–	1	–	1
Nebraska		–		6	–	1	–	1
Beloit		–		7	–	1	–	2
Kirksville Osteopaths		–		7	–	2	–	1
Washburn		–		6	–	2	–	0
Wittenberg		–		5	–	2	–	1
Drake		–		6	–	3	–	0
Doane		–		2	–	1	–	0
Notre Dame		–		6	–	3	–	1
Fairmount		–		5	–	3	–	0
Detroit College		–		3	–	2	–	0
South Dakota Agricultural		–		3	–	2	–	0
Washington University		–		3	–	2	–	1
Carthage		–		4	–	3	–	0
Wabash		–		5	–	4	–	0
Lincoln (MO)		–		2	–	2	–	0
Missouri		–		4	–	4	–	1
Northern Illinois State		–		2	–	2	–	2
Iowa State Normal		–		3	–	4	–	1
Buchtel		–		2	–	3	–	1
Cincinnati		–		3	–	5	–	1
Ohio		–		2	–	4	–	1
Kansas State		–		2	–	4	–	0
Kansas		–		2	–	5	–	2
Ohio Wesleyan		–		2	–	5	–	2
Iowa State		–		2	–	5	–	1
Butler		–		0	–	1	–	3
Heidelberg		–		0	–	2	–	2
Chicago P&S		–		1	–	3	–	0
Mount Union		–		1	–	4	–	1
Miami (OH)		–		0	–	4	–	0

The 1900 Iowa State Cyclones football team represented Iowa State College of Agricultural and Mechanic Arts (later renamed Iowa State University) as an independent during the 1900 college football season. In their first and only season under head coach C. E. Woodruff, the Cyclones compiled a 2–5–1 record and were outscored by opponents by a combined total of 100 to 38. L. M. Chambers was the team captain.

Between 1892 and 1913, the football team played on a field that later became the site of the university's Parks Library.

== Schedule ==
Date	Opponent	Site	Result	Source
September 29	at Penn (IA)	Oskaloosa, IA	W 16–0	
October 6	at Minnesota	Northrop Field; Minneapolis, MN	L 0–27	
October 13	at Nebraska	Antelope Field; Lincoln, NE (rivalry)	L 0–30	
October 27	Simpson	State Field; Ames, IA	T 0–0	
November 3	at Grinnell	Ward Field; Grinnell, IA	L 5–22	
November 10	at Drake	Des Moines, IA	L 0–16	
November 17	at Iowa State Normal	Cedar Falls, IA	L 0–5	
November 24	at Cornell (IA)	Mount Vernon, IA	W 17–0	
