= 1900 Kansas Jayhawks football team =

American college football season

1900 Kansas Jayhawks football
- Conference: Independent
- Record: 2–5–2
- Head coach: L. W. Boynton (1st season)
- Captain: Charles Wilcox
- Home stadium: McCook Field

1900 Midwestern college football independents records
	Conf.			Overall
Team	W	L	T	W		L		T
Central Michigan		–		1	–	0	–	0
Lake Forest		–		1	–	0	–	0
Haskell		–		9	–	1	–	0
North Dakota Agricultural		–		8	–	1	–	1
Ohio State		–		8	–	1	–	1
Nebraska		–		6	–	1	–	1
Beloit		–		7	–	1	–	2
Kirksville Osteopaths		–		7	–	2	–	1
Washburn		–		6	–	2	–	0
Wittenberg		–		5	–	2	–	1
Drake		–		6	–	3	–	0
Doane		–		2	–	1	–	0
Notre Dame		–		6	–	3	–	1
Fairmount		–		5	–	3	–	0
Detroit College		–		3	–	2	–	0
South Dakota Agricultural		–		3	–	2	–	0
Washington University		–		3	–	2	–	1
Carthage		–		4	–	3	–	0
Wabash		–		5	–	4	–	0
Lincoln (MO)		–		2	–	2	–	0
Missouri		–		4	–	4	–	1
Northern Illinois State		–		2	–	2	–	2
Iowa State Normal		–		3	–	4	–	1
Buchtel		–		2	–	3	–	1
Cincinnati		–		3	–	5	–	1
Ohio		–		2	–	4	–	1
Kansas State		–		2	–	4	–	0
Kansas		–		2	–	5	–	2
Ohio Wesleyan		–		2	–	5	–	2
Iowa State		–		2	–	5	–	1
Butler		–		0	–	1	–	3
Heidelberg		–		0	–	2	–	2
Chicago P&S		–		1	–	3	–	0
Mount Union		–		1	–	4	–	1
Miami (OH)		–		0	–	4	–	0

The 1900 Kansas Jayhawks football team was an American football team that represented the University of Kansas as an independent during the 1900 college football season. In August 1900, Lawrence W. Boynton, a recent graduate of Cornell, accepted an offer to serve as the Kansas football coach. In their only season under Boynton, the Jayhawks compiled a 2–5–2 record and were outscored by a total of 118 to 75. The Jayhawks played home games at McCook Field in Lawrence, Kansas. Charles Wilcox was the team captain.

== Schedule ==
Date	Time	Opponent	Site	Result	Attendance	Source
October 1		at Ottawa	Ottawa, KS	W 6–0		
October 6		Washburn	McCook Field; Lawrence, KS	L 0–24		
October 20		Kansas State Normal	McCook Field; Lawrence, KS	T 6–6		
October 26		at South Dakota	Vermillion, SD	W 42–0		
November 3	3:00 p.m.	at Kansas City Medics	Exposition Park; Kansas City, MO	L 15–23	3,000	
November 10		Washburn	McCook Field; Lawrence, KS	L 0–29		
November 17		Nebraska	McCook Field; Lawrence, KS (rivalry)	L 0–12		
November 21		at Kansas State Normal	Emporia, KS	L 0–18	1,500	
November 29	3:10 p.m.	vs. Missouri	Exposition Park; Kansas City, MO (rivalry)	T 6–6	7,000	
