= Washington University Bears football =

American college football organization

- First season: 1887; 139 years ago
- Athletic director: Anthony J. Azama
- Head coach: Aaron Keen; 5th season, 38–15 (.717)
- Location: St. Louis, Missouri
- Stadium: Francis Olympic Field (capacity: 3,300)
- NCAA division: Division III
- Conference: NCAC
- Colors: Red and green
- All-time record: 546–494–33 (.524)
- Bowl record: 0–3 (.000)

Conference championships
- 19
- Consensus All-Americans: 55
- Rivalries: Chicago Maroons
- Fight song: Fight for Washington
- Marching band: Bear Nation Varsity Band
- Outfitter: Nike
- Website: bearsports.wustl.edu

The Washington University Bears football team represents Washington University in St. Louis in college football. The team competes at the NCAA Division III level as an affiliate member of the North Coast Athletic Conference (NCAC). They are a primary member of the University Athletic Association, of which they were a founding member. They were previously a founding member of the Missouri Valley Conference whose bigger schools split into the Big Eight Conference and then added a few members to form the Big 12 Conference.

On September 4, 2024, the Division III web outlet D3sports.com reported that the CCIW would expel Washington from football membership after the 2025 season, with the report soon confirmed by the conference office. On October 18, 2024, the North Coast Athletic Conference announced that Washington would join as a football-only member, beginning in the 2026 season.

The school's first football team was fielded in 1887. The team plays its home games at the 3,300 seat Francis Olympic Field.

Former Washington University Bears football player and head coach Jimmy Conzelman is in the Pro Football Hall of Fame. Another former head coach, Weeb Ewbank, later coach of AFL, NFL, and Super Bowl champion teams is also in the Pro Football Hall of Fame.

Two former Washington University head coaches have been inducted into the College Football Hall of Fame: Bob Higgins in 1954 and Carl Snavely in 1965.

Two former Washington University players have also been inducted into the College Football Hall of Fame: Harvey Jablonsky in 1978 and Shelby Jordan in 2013. Both Jablonsky and Jordan were All-Americans. Jordan went on to win Super Bowl XVIII with the Los Angeles Raiders.

Former Bears linebacker Brandon Roberts won the Vincent dePaul Draddy Trophy from the National Football Foundation as the nation's top football student-athlete in 2002. Roberts is the only non-FBS recipient of the award.

== History ==
=== Conference memberships ===
| Years | Conference |
|---|---|
| 1887–1906 | Independent |
| 1907–1942 | Missouri Valley Conference |
| 1943–1946 | No team |
| 1947–1962 | Independent |
| 1963–1972 | College Athletic Conference |
| 1973–1987 | Independent |
| 1988–2017 | University Athletic Association |
| 2015–2016 | Southern Athletic Association |
| 2018–2025 | College Conference of Illinois and Wisconsin |
| 2026–present | North Coast Athletic Conference |

== Seasons ==
| Year | Head coach | Conference | Overall record | Conference record |
|---|---|---|---|---|
| 1887 | Unknown | — | 1–0 | — |
| 1888 | Unknown | — | 1–0 | — |
| 1889 | Arthur L. Tuttle (player-coach) | — | 1–0 | — |
| 1890 | Arthur L. Tuttle (player-coach) | — | 2–0 | — |
| 1891 | Arthur L. Tuttle (player-coach) | — | 4–1–1 | — |
| 1892 | Arthur L. Tuttle (player-coach) | — | 3–2 | — |
| 1893 | Unknown | — | 1–1 | — |
| 1894 | Unknown | — | 2–1 | — |
| 1895 | Unknown | — | 2–0 | — |
| 1896 | Unknown | — | 0–2 | — |
| 1897 | Unknown | — | 0–2 | — |
| 1898 | Edwin W. Lee | — | 6–0 | — |
| 1899 | Arthur N. Sager | — | 5–1–0 | — |
| 1900 | Edwin W. Lee | — | 3–2–1 | — |
| 1901 | Gordon Clarke | — | 5–3–1 | — |
| 1902 | Hugh White | — | 2–6–1 | — |
| 1903 | L. W. Boynton | — | 4–4–2 | — |
| 1904 | L. W. Boynton | — | 4–7 | — |
| 1905 | Charles A. Fairweather | — | 7–3–2 | — |
| 1906 | J. Merrill Blanchard | — | 2–2–2 | — |
| 1907 | J. Merrill Blanchard | MVC | 1–5–1 | 0–1 |
| 1908 | Francis M. Cayou | MVC | 4–4–1 | 0–2 |
| 1909 | Francis M. Cayou | MVC | 3–4 | 0–2 |
| 1910 | Francis M. Cayou | MVC | 3–4 | 0–2 |
| 1911 | Francis M. Cayou | MVC | 4–2–2 | 0–0–2 |
| 1912 | Francis M. Cayou | MVC | 4–4 | 0–2 |
| 1913 | William P. Edmunds | MVC | 1–5 | 0–4 |
| 1914 | William P. Edmunds | MVC | 2–2–1 | 0–1–1 |
| 1915 | William P. Edmunds | MVC | 3–2 | 1–1 |
| 1916 | William P. Edmunds | MVC | 3–3–1 | 0–2 |
| 1917 | Dick Rutherford | MVC | 4–3 | 1–2 |
| 1918 | Dick Rutherford | MVC | 6–0 | — (WWI) |
| 1919 | Dick Rutherford | MVC | 5–2 | 2–2 |
| 1920 | George Rider | MVC | 4–4 | 1–4 |
| 1921 | George Rider | MVC | 4–3–1 | 2–3 |
| 1922 | George Rider | MVC | 1–5–1 | 0–5–1 |
| 1923 | Byron Wimberly | MVC | 3–5 | 1–4 |
| 1924 | Byron Wimberly | MVC | 4–4 | 0–4 |
| 1925 | Bob Higgins | MVC | 2–5–1 | 1–4–1 |
| 1926 | Bob Higgins | MVC | 1–7 | 0–6 |
| 1927 | Bob Higgins | MVC | 5–2–2 | 2–2–1 |
| 1928 | Al Sharpe | MVC | 2–5–1 | 0–2 |
| 1929 | Al Sharpe | MVC | 3–4–1 | 0–1–1 |
| 1930 | Al Sharpe | MVC | 4–2–2 | 2–2 |
| 1931 | Al Sharpe | MVC | 2–7 | 0–3 |
| 1932 | Jimmy Conzelman | MVC | 4–4 | 1–2 |
| 1933 | Jimmy Conzelman | MVC | 4–5 | 1–2 |
| 1934 | Jimmy Conzelman | MVC | 7–3 | 1–0† |
| 1935 | Jimmy Conzelman | MVC | 6–4 | 3–0‡ |
| 1936 | Jimmy Conzelman | MVC | 3–7 | 1–1 |
| 1937 | Jimmy Conzelman | MVC | 4–6 | 2–2 |
| 1938 | Jimmy Conzelman | MVC | 6–3–1 | 2–1–1 |
| 1939 | Jimmy Conzelman | MVC | 6–3–1 | 4–1† |
| 1940 | Frank Loebs | MVC | 3–6 | 1–3 |
| 1941 | Frank Loebs | MVC | 4–5 | 1–3 |
| 1942 | Tom Gorman | MVC | 5–5 | 2–3 |
| 1943 | No Football |
| 1944 | No Football |
| 1945 | No Football |
| 1946 | No Football |
| 1947 | Weeb Ewbank | — | 5–3 | — |
| 1948 | Weeb Ewbank | — | 9–1 | — |
| 1949 | Irv Utz | — | 7–2 | — |
| 1950 | Irv Utz | — | 2–7 | — |
| 1951 | Irv Utz | — | 5–4 | — |
| 1952 | Irv Utz | — | 4–5 | — |
| 1953 | Carl Snavely | — | 7–2 | — |
| 1954 | Carl Snavely | — | 6–3 | — |
| 1955 | Carl Snavely | — | 5–4 | — |
| 1956 | Carl Snavely | — | 6–3 | — |
| 1957 | Carl Snavely | — | 5–3 | — |
| 1958 | Carl Snavely | — | 4–4 | — |
| 1959 | Lynn Hovland | — | 1–7 | — |
| 1960 | Lynn Hovland | — | 2–7 | — |
| 1961 | Lynn Hovland | — | 0–9 | — |
| 1962 | Dave Puddington | — | 5–3 | — |
| 1963 | Dave Puddington | CAC | 6–2–1 | 1–1 |
| 1964 | Dave Puddington | CAC | 6–3–1 | 3–1‡ |
| 1965 | Dave Puddington | CAC | 7–2 | 3–1 |
| 1966 | Dave Puddington | CAC | 7–2 | 4–0† |
| 1967 | Dave Puddington | CAC | 5–4–1 | 2–2 |
| 1968 | Richard D. Martin | CAC | 2–8 | 0–4 |
| 1969 | Richard D. Martin | CAC | 2–7 | 1–3 |
| 1970 | Richard D. Martin | CAC | 5–4 | 3–1‡ |
| 1971 | Richard D. Martin | CAC | 4–5 | 1–3 |
| 1972 | Don McCright | CAC | 6–3 | 4–0† |
| 1973 | Don McCright | — | 6–2–1 | — |
| 1974 | Don McCright | — | 5–4 | — |
| 1975 | Don McCright | — | 4–5 | — |
| 1976 | Don McCright | — | 3–6 | — |
| 1977 | Chris Gianoulakis | — | 5–4 | — |
| 1978 | Chris Gianoulakis | — | 5–4 | — |
| 1979 | Chris Gianoulakis | — | 2–7 | — |
| 1980 | Ken Henderson | — | 2–7 | — |
| 1981 | Ken Henderson | — | 2–7 | — |
| 1982 | Ken Henderson | — | 2–7 | — |
| 1983 | Fred Remmy | — | 2–6–1 | — |
| 1984 | Fred Remmy | — | 4–5 | — |
| 1985 | Fred Remmy | — | 3–7 | — |
| 1986 | Fred Remmy | — | 2–7 | — |
| 1987 | Ken Woody | — | 1–8 | — |
| 1988 | Ken Woody | UAA | 2–8 | 1–3 |
| 1989 | Larry Kindbom | UAA | 4–5 | 2–2 |
| 1990 | Larry Kindbom | UAA | 7–3 | 2–2 |
| 1991 | Larry Kindbom | UAA | 6–4 | 1–3 |
| 1992 | Larry Kindbom | UAA | 4–6 | 1–3 |
| 1993 | Larry Kindbom | UAA | 6–4 | 1–3 |
| 1994 | Larry Kindbom | UAA | 7–3 | 3–1‡ |
| 1995 | Larry Kindbom | UAA | 9–1 | 3–1‡ |
| 1996 | Larry Kindbom | UAA | 7–3 | 3–1‡ |
| 1997 | Larry Kindbom | UAA | 6–4 | 3–1 |
| 1998 | Larry Kindbom | UAA | 6–4 | 2–2 |
| 1999 | Larry Kindbom | UAA | 8–3 | 4–0†* |
| 2000 | Larry Kindbom | UAA | 6–4 | 3–1 |
| 2001 | Larry Kindbom | UAA | 8–2 | 4–0† |
| 2002 | Larry Kindbom | UAA | 6–4 | 4–0† |
| 2003 | Larry Kindbom | UAA | 6–4 | 4–0† |
| 2004 | Larry Kindbom | UAA | 6–4 | 3–0† |
| 2005 | Larry Kindbom | UAA | 6–4 | 2–1 |
| 2006 | Larry Kindbom | UAA | 6–4 | 2–1 |
| 2007 | Larry Kindbom | UAA | 7–3 | 1–2 |
| 2008 | Larry Kindbom | UAA | 5–5 | 1–2 |
| 2009 | Larry Kindbom | UAA | 4–6 | 1–2 |
| 2010 | Larry Kindbom | UAA | 7–3 | 2–1 |
| 2011 | Larry Kindbom | UAA | 6–4 | 2–1 |
| 2012 | Larry Kindbom | UAA | 5–5 | 3–0† |
| 2013 | Larry Kindbom | UAA | 8–3 | 3–0†* |
| 2014 | Larry Kindbom | UAA | 4–6 | 1–2 |
| 2015 | Larry Kindbom | SAA / UAA | 6–4 | 5–3 / 2–1‡ |
| 2016 | Larry Kindbom | SAA / UAA | 8–3 | 7–1‡ / 2–1‡* |
| 2017 | Larry Kindbom | UAA | 3–6 | 0–2 |
| 2018 | Larry Kindbom | CCIW | 8–2 | 7–2 |
| 2019 | Larry Kindbom | CCIW | 7–3 | 6–3 |
| 2020 | Aaron Keen | CCIW | Did not play due to COVID-19 | DNP |
| 2021 | Aaron Keen | CCIW | 7–4 | 7–2 |
| 2022 | Aaron Keen | CCIW | 8–3 | 7–2 |
| 2023 | Aaron Keen | CCIW | 7–3 | 6–3 |
| 2024 | Aaron Keen | CCIW | 8–2 | 7–2 |
| 2025 | Aaron Keen | CCIW | 8–3 | 7–2 |

†- Conference champions ‡- Conference co-champions *- Playoff Appearance

== Postseason appearances ==
=== NCAA Division III playoffs ===
The WashU Bears have made four appearances in the NCAA Division III playoffs, with a combined record of 0–3.

| Year | Round | Opponent | Result |
|---|---|---|---|
| 1999 | First Round | Hardin–Simmons | L, 21–28 |
| 2013 | First Round | Franklin | L, 10–17 |
| 2016 | First Round | Wisconsin–Oshkosh | L, 13–49 |
| 2026 | Second Round | Wartburg | TBP |

=== Bowl games ===
The WashU Bears have made three NCAA Division III bowl appearances, with a combined record of 0–3.

| Year | Bowl | Coach | Opponent | Result |
|---|---|---|---|---|
| 2021 | Isthmus Bowl | Aaron Keen | Wisconsin–River Falls | L, 27–48 |
| 2022 | Isthmus Bowl | Aaron Keen | Wisconsin–River Falls | L, 24–31 |
| 2025 | Isthmus Bowl | Aaron Keen | Wisconsin–Stout | L, 23–31 |

== NFL draft picks ==
1937 — 9th round, 3rd pick, 83rd overall — Chicago Cardinals — Dwight Hafeli — End
1938 — 3rd round, 2nd pick, 17th overall — Philadelphia Eagles — Joe Bukant — FB
1942 — 3rd round, 4th pick, 19th overall — Chicago Cardinals — Bud Schwenk — QB
1950 — 21st round, 12th pick, 273rd overall — Cleveland Browns — Leroy Vogts — G
1955 — 20th round, 1st pick, 230th overall — Chicago Cardinals — Jim Burst — HB
1973 — 7th round, 1st pick, 157th overall — Houston Oilers — Shelby Jordan — T

== All-Americans ==
1929 — Harvey Jablonsky
1933 — Glynn Clark (AP Honorable Mention)
1934 — Harry Brown (AP Honorable Mention)
1935 — Bob Hudgens (AAB Honorable Mention, NEA Honorable Mention); Joe Bukant (AP Honorable Mention)
1936 — Dwight Hafeli (AP Honorable Mention)
1937 — Raymond Hobbs (Colliers)
1941 — Wilson “Bud” Schwenk (AP Honorable Mention)
1956 — Ed Lind (AP Honorable Mention, Little All-America First Team)
1957 — Ed Lind (AP Honorable Mention, Little All-America Honorable Mention); Don Polkinghorne (Little All-America First Team)
1960 — Paul Isham (AP Little All-America Honorable Mention)
1962 — Paul Isham (AP Honorable Mention)
1963 — Arnie Edwards (AP Honorable Mention)
1964 — James Powers (AP Honorable Mention)
1970 — James Marx (AP Honorable Mention)
1971 — Stu Watkins (AP Little All-America Honorable Mention)
1972 — Shelby Jordan (Kodak First Team); Stu Watkins (AP Little All-America Honorable Mention)
1973 — Stu Watkins (Kodak First Team)
1974 — Marion Stallings (Kodak First Team)
1981 — Dave Bolton (Sporting News Honorable Mention)
1988 — Paul Matthews (Kodak First Team, AP Little AllAmerica Second Team, Pizza Hut Third Team, Football Gazette Honorable Mention)
1989 — Eric Nyhus (Pizza Hut First Team, Football Gazette Second Team); Stacey Hightower (Football Gazette Honorable Mention, Pizza Hut Honorable Mention)
1990 — Eric Nyhus (Football Gazette Second Team)
1991 — Michael Lauber (Champion U.S.A. Second Team, Football Gazette Third Team); Jeff Doyle (Football Gazette Third Team); Aaron Keen (Football Gazette Honorable Mention)
1992 — Michael Lauber (Champion U.S.A. Honorable Mention, Football Gazette Honorable Mention)
1993 — Jeff Doyle (Champion U.S.A. Third Team, Football Gazette Second Team); Aaron Keen (Football Gazette Honorable Mention)
1994 — Matt Gomric (Division III First Team, Football Gazette First Team)
1995 — Chris Nalley (Hewlett-Packard First Team, Football Gazette Second Team, American Football Quarterly First Team); Josh Haza (Hewlett-Packard Honorable Mention)
1996 — Chris Nalley (Hewlett-Packard First Team, Foot- ball Gazette First Team, American Football Quarterly First Team); Joe El-Etr (Hewlett-Packard Second Team, Football Gazette Second Team), Aaron Boehm (HewlettPackard Third Team).
1997 — Joe El-Etr (Hewlett-Packard Second Team), Brad Klein (Hewlett-Packard Second Team, Football Gazette Second Team).
1999 — Tim Runnalls (Hewlett-Packard First Team, Football Gazette Lineman of the Year and First Team, Burger King Coaches’ Association First Team, AFCA Aztec Bowl selection, D3football.com Second Team), Kevin Dym (D3football.com Third Team)
2000 — James Molnar (D3football.com Second Team), Jonathan Feig (D3football.com Third Team)
2001 — James Molnar (Hewlett-Packard Honorable Mention)
2003 — Rick Schmitz (CoSIDA Third Team)
2005 — Joe Rizzo (Associated Press Little Second Team, Football Gazette Second Team, D3football.com Honorable Mention), Brad Duesing (Football Gazette Honorable Mention)
2006 — Drew Wethington (Football Gazette Third Team)
2010 — Brandon Brown (D3football.com First Team)
2015 — Alex Hallwachs (D3football.com Third Team), Quincy Marting (D3football.com Honorable Mention)
2016 — Matt Page (AFCA First Team, D3football.com Second Team), Kevin Hammarlund (AFCA Second Team, D3football.com Honorable Mention)
2017 — Johnny Davidson (D3football.com Third Team)
2018 — Hank Michalski (AFCA Second Team)
