= 1900 Missouri Tigers football team =

American college football season

1900 Missouri Tigers football
- Conference: Independent
- Record: 4–4–1
- Head coach: Dave Fultz (3rd season; first game); Fred W. Murphy (1st season, final 8 games)
- Captain: Carl Kruse
- Home stadium: Rollins Field

1900 Midwestern college football independents records
	Conf.			Overall
Team	W	L	T	W		L		T
Central Michigan		–		1	–	0	–	0
Lake Forest		–		1	–	0	–	0
Haskell		–		9	–	1	–	0
North Dakota Agricultural		–		8	–	1	–	1
Ohio State		–		8	–	1	–	1
Nebraska		–		6	–	1	–	1
Beloit		–		7	–	1	–	2
Kirksville Osteopaths		–		7	–	2	–	1
Washburn		–		6	–	2	–	0
Wittenberg		–		5	–	2	–	1
Drake		–		6	–	3	–	0
Doane		–		2	–	1	–	0
Notre Dame		–		6	–	3	–	1
Fairmount		–		5	–	3	–	0
Detroit College		–		3	–	2	–	0
South Dakota Agricultural		–		3	–	2	–	0
Washington University		–		3	–	2	–	1
Carthage		–		4	–	3	–	0
Wabash		–		5	–	4	–	0
Lincoln (MO)		–		2	–	2	–	0
Missouri		–		4	–	4	–	1
Northern Illinois State		–		2	–	2	–	2
Iowa State Normal		–		3	–	4	–	1
Buchtel		–		2	–	3	–	1
Cincinnati		–		3	–	5	–	1
Ohio		–		2	–	4	–	1
Kansas State		–		2	–	4	–	0
Kansas		–		2	–	5	–	2
Ohio Wesleyan		–		2	–	5	–	2
Iowa State		–		2	–	5	–	1
Butler		–		0	–	1	–	3
Heidelberg		–		0	–	2	–	2
Chicago P&S		–		1	–	3	–	0
Mount Union		–		1	–	4	–	1
Miami (OH)		–		0	–	4	–	0

The 1900 Missouri Tigers football team was an American football team that represented the University of Missouri as an independent during the 1900 college football season. The team compiled a 4–4–1 record and was outscored by its opponents by a combined total of 80 to 71. Dave Fultz began the season as the team's head coach before resigning after Missouri's season opener, a win over the Kirksville Osteopaths. He was replaced by Fred W. Murphy, who led the team for the remainder of the season. The team played its home games at Rollins Field in Columbia, Missouri.

== Schedule ==
Date	Time	Opponent	Site	Result	Attendance	Source
October 1		Kirksville Osteopaths	Rollins Field; Columbia, MO	W 13–0		
October 8		Haskell	Rollins Field; Columbia, MO	L 0–11		
October 15		Warrensburg Teachers	Rollins Field; Columbia, MO	W 11–6		
October 20		at Kansas City Medics	Kansas City, MO	L 12–18		
October 27	3:00 p.m.	at Washington University	League Park; St. Louis, MO	W 6–5	2,000	
October 29		at Missouri Mines	School of Mines Park; Rolla, MO	W 12–5		
November 5		Nebraska	Rollins Field; Columbia, MO (rivalry)	L 0–12		
November 17		at Texas	Varsity Athletic Field; Austin, TX	L 11–17		
November 29	3:10 p.m.	vs. Kansas	Exposition Park; Kansas City, MO (rivalry)	T 6–6	7,000	
