= 1900 Nebraska Cornhuskers football team =

American college football season

1900 Nebraska Cornhuskers football
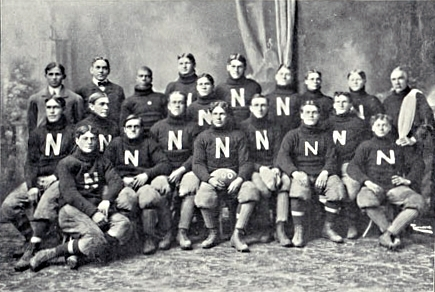
- Conference: Independent
- Record: 6–1–1
- Head coach: Walter C. Booth (1st season)
- Home stadium: Antelope Field

1900 Midwestern college football independents records
	Conf.			Overall
Team	W	L	T	W		L		T
Central Michigan		–		1	–	0	–	0
Lake Forest		–		1	–	0	–	0
Haskell		–		9	–	1	–	0
North Dakota Agricultural		–		8	–	1	–	1
Ohio State		–		8	–	1	–	1
Nebraska		–		6	–	1	–	1
Beloit		–		7	–	1	–	2
Kirksville Osteopaths		–		7	–	2	–	1
Washburn		–		6	–	2	–	0
Wittenberg		–		5	–	2	–	1
Drake		–		6	–	3	–	0
Doane		–		2	–	1	–	0
Notre Dame		–		6	–	3	–	1
Fairmount		–		5	–	3	–	0
Detroit College		–		3	–	2	–	0
South Dakota Agricultural		–		3	–	2	–	0
Washington University		–		3	–	2	–	1
Carthage		–		4	–	3	–	0
Wabash		–		5	–	4	–	0
Lincoln (MO)		–		2	–	2	–	0
Missouri		–		4	–	4	–	1
Northern Illinois State		–		2	–	2	–	2
Iowa State Normal		–		3	–	4	–	1
Buchtel		–		2	–	3	–	1
Cincinnati		–		3	–	5	–	1
Ohio		–		2	–	4	–	1
Kansas State		–		2	–	4	–	0
Kansas		–		2	–	5	–	2
Ohio Wesleyan		–		2	–	5	–	2
Iowa State		–		2	–	5	–	1
Butler		–		0	–	1	–	3
Heidelberg		–		0	–	2	–	2
Chicago P&S		–		1	–	3	–	0
Mount Union		–		1	–	4	–	1
Miami (OH)		–		0	–	4	–	0

The 1900 Nebraska Cornhuskers football team represented the University of Nebraska as an independent during the 1900 college football season. Led by first-year head coach Walter C. Booth, the Cornhuskers compiled a record of 6–1–1, excluding two exhibition games. Nebraska played home games at Antelope Field in Lincoln, Nebraska.

Booth replaced the departed Alonzo Edwin Branch to become Nebraska's ninth coach in 11 seasons of football. This was the first season the team was officially known as the "Cornhuskers", adopting the moniker after it was coined by Cy Sherman of the Nebraska State Journal.

== Schedule ==
Date	Opponent	Site	Result	Attendance	Source
September 29	Lincoln High School	Antelope Field; Lincoln, NE	W 22–0 (exhibition)		
October 6	Alumni	Antelope Field; Lincoln, NE	T 0–0 (exhibition)		
October 13	Iowa State	Antelope Field; Lincoln, NE (rivalry)	W 30–0		
October 20	Drake	Antelope Field; Lincoln, NE	W 8–0		
October 27	at Kansas City Medics	Kansas City, MO	T 0–0		
October 29	at Tarkio	Tarkio, MO	W 5–0		
November 5	at Missouri	Rollins Field; Columbia, MO (rivalry)	W 12–0		
November 10	Grinnell	Antelope Field; Lincoln, NE	W 33–0		
November 17	at Kansas	Central Park; Lawrence, KS (rivalry)	W 12–0		
November 29	Minnesota	Antelope Field; Lincoln, NE (rivalry)	L 12–20	3,000	

== Coaching staff ==
Coach	Position	First year	Alma mater
Walter C. Booth	Head coach	1900	Princeton
Jack Best	Trainer	1890	Nebraska
Harry Tukey	Manager	1900	Nebraska

== Roster ==
Bender, Johnny QB
Brew, Fred LT
Cook, Hugh FB
Cortelyou, Spencer E
Crandall, Harry HB
Dasenbrock, John G
Drain, Ralph QB
Emmons T
Johnson, William E
Koehler, John C
McKillop T
Montgomery, Robert HB
Nielsen HB
Pillsbury, Melville T
Raymond, Isaac FB
Ringer, John LG
Ryan E
Voss T
Westover, John RT
Wood FB
Worel, L. T

== Game summaries ==
=== Lincoln High ===
Lincoln High at Nebraska

Team	1	2	Total
Lincoln High			0
• Nebraska			22

- Date: September 29
- Location: Antelope Field, Lincoln, NE

Nebraska again participated in a pre-season scrimmage against Lincoln High School, a 22–0 shutout victory.

=== Alumni game ===
Alumni at Nebraska

Team	1	2	Total
Alumni			0
Nebraska			0

- Date: October 6
- Location: Antelope Field, Lincoln, NE

For the first time, Nebraska football alumni faced its current roster in an exhibition game. The game ended in a 0–0 draw.

=== Iowa State ===
Iowa State at Nebraska

Team	1	2	Total
Iowa State			0
• Nebraska			30

- Date: October 13
- Location: Antelope Field, Lincoln, NE

Booth's first game at Nebraska was a resounding 30–0 shutout of Iowa State in Lincoln.

=== Drake ===
Drake at Nebraska

Team	1	2	Total
Drake	0	0	0
• Nebraska	0	8	8

- Date: October 20
- Location: Antelope Field, Lincoln, NE
- Game weather: Windy

A late touchdown and safety by Nebraska were the only points from either team on a windy afternoon in Lincoln.

=== At Kansas City Medics ===
Nebraska at Kansas City Medics

Team	1	2	Total
Nebraska	0	0	0
Kansas City Medics	0	0	0

- Date: October 27
- Location: Kansas City, MO

The final meeting between the Kansas City Medics and Nebraska ended in a 0–0 draw, Nebraska's third consecutive shutout to begin the season.

=== At Tarkio ===
Nebraska at Tarkio

Team	1	2	Total
• Nebraska	5	0	5
Tarkio	0	0	0

- Date: October 29
- Location: Tarkio, MO

Just two days after playing in Kansas City, the Cornhuskers made their first trip to Tarkio. Nebraska scored an early touchdown that, despite protests from Tarkio and its supporters, remained the only score of the game. The final outcome was disputed strongly enough in Tarkio that the home town newspaper reported the score as a 0–0 draw. This was the final meeting between Tarkio and Nebraska.

=== At Missouri ===
Nebraska at Missouri

Team	1	2	Total
• Nebraska	6	6	12
Missouri	0	0	0

- Date: November 5
- Location: Columbia, MO

Nebraska defeated Missouri 12–0 in Columbia, extending NU's shutout streak to five games.

=== Grinnell ===
Grinnell at Nebraska

Team	1	2	Total
Grinnell	0	0	0
• Nebraska	22	11	33

- Date: November 10
- Location: Antelope Field, Lincoln, NE
- Game weather: Snow

Nebraska dominated Grinnell, whose only chance to score came late in the game and resulted in a missed field goal.

=== At Kansas ===
Nebraska at Kansas

Team	1	2	Total
• Nebraska	6	6	12
Kansas	0	0	0

- Date: November 17
- Location: Central Park, Lawrence, KS

Nebraska closed out its seventh consecutive shutout with a 12–0 victory over Kansas in Lawrence.

=== Minnesota ===
Minnesota at Nebraska

Team	1	2	Total
• Minnesota	10	10	20
Nebraska	0	12	12

- Date: November 29
- Location: Antelope Field, Lincoln, NE
- Game attendance: 3,000

Nebraska's unbeaten run came to an end as the Cornhuskers hosted Minnesota in the first game of what would later become a frequent rivalry. The Gophers were a national powerhouse at the time, and the 12 points scored by Nebraska were more than all other Golden Gophers opponents in 1900 combined.
