= 1901 Lincoln Tigers football team =

American college football season

1901 Lincoln Tigers football
- Conference: Independent
- Record: 1–1–1 or 1–2 (4 played)

1901 Midwestern college football independents records
| | Conf. | | | Overall |
| Team | W | L | T | W | | L | | T |
|---|---|---|---|---|---|---|---|---|
| Saint Louis | | – | | 10 | – | 0 | – | 0 |
| North Dakota Agricultural | | – | | 7 | – | 0 | – | 0 |
| Marquette | | – | | 4 | – | 0 | – | 1 |
| Northern Illinois State | | – | | 6 | – | 1 | – | 0 |
| Notre Dame | | – | | 8 | – | 1 | – | 1 |
| Ohio Wesleyan | | – | | 8 | – | 2 | – | 0 |
| Kirksville Osteopaths | | – | | 10 | – | 3 | – | 0 |
| Nebraska | | – | | 6 | – | 2 | – | 0 |
| Ohio | | – | | 6 | – | 1 | – | 2 |
| Doane | | – | | 3 | – | 1 | – | 0 |
| Haskell | | – | | 6 | – | 2 | – | 0 |
| Lake Forest | | – | | 10 | – | 5 | – | 0 |
| Ohio State | | – | | 5 | – | 3 | – | 1 |
| Washington University | | – | | 5 | – | 3 | – | 1 |
| Ohio Medical | | – | | 5 | – | 3 | – | 1 |
| Iowa State Normal | | – | | 5 | – | 3 | – | 2 |
| South Dakota Agricultural | | – | | 3 | – | 2 | – | 0 |
| Beloit | | – | | 5 | – | 3 | – | 3 |
| Washburn | | – | | 3 | – | 2 | – | 3 |
| Carthage | | – | | 1 | – | 1 | – | 0 |
| Drake | | – | | 4 | – | 4 | – | 0 |
| Detroit College | | – | | 3 | – | 3 | – | 0 |
| Mount Union | | – | | 5 | – | 5 | – | 1 |
| Wittenberg | | – | | 4 | – | 4 | – | 0 |
| Kansas State | | – | | 3 | – | 4 | – | 1 |
| Iowa State | | – | | 2 | – | 6 | – | 2 |
| Kansas | | – | | 3 | – | 5 | – | 2 |
| Wabash | | – | | 4 | – | 7 | – | 0 |
| Fairmount | | – | | 3 | – | 6 | – | 0 |
| Heidelberg | | – | | 1 | – | 3 | – | 1 |
| Miami (OH) | | – | | 1 | – | 3 | – | 1 |
| Cincinnati | | – | | 1 | – | 4 | – | 1 |
| Case | | – | | 2 | – | 7 | – | 0 |
| Missouri | | – | | 1 | – | 6 | – | 1 |
| Butler | | – | | 0 | – | 1 | – | 0 |
| Chicago Eclectic Medical | | – | | 0 | – | 3 | – | 0 |

The 1901 Lincoln Tigers football team represented Lincoln Institute—now known as Lincoln University—in Jefferson City, Missouri as an independent during the 1901 college football season. The Lincoln football team finished the season with a record of at least 1–1, but played four games. The Tigers scheduled matches against other black schools in the region, including George R. Smith College, Fisk University, and Sumner High School.

== Schedule ==
| Date | Time | Opponent | Site | Result | Attendance | Source |
|---|---|---|---|---|---|---|
| November 8 | | at George R. Smith | Sedalia, MO | L 12–14 (or T 12–12) | | |
| November 12 | | at George R. Smith | Liberty Park; Sedalia, MO | | | |
| November 28 | | at Sumner High School | Handlan's Park; St. Louis, MO | W 6–0 | 600 | |
| November 29 | 2:00 p.m. | vs. Fisk | Handlan's Park; St. Louis, MO | L 6–12 | | |
