= 1901 South Bend Athletic Association football team =

American college football season

1901 South Bend Athletic Association football

Athletic Club of the West champion
- Conference: Independent
- Record: 6–1–3
- Captains: Pat O'Dea; James McWeeney
- Home stadium: Springbrook Park

The 1901 South Bend Athletic Association football team was an American football team that represented the South Bend Athletic Association in the 1901 football season. Under player-coach Pat O'Dea, who also coached the Notre Dame football team in their 1901 football season, helped the South Bend Athletic Association to a 6–1–3 record. The team outscored their opponents 139 to 24, posting five shutouts and three scoreless ties. They played Notre Dame a record four times in one season, and held a record of 1–1–2 against the neighboring South Bend Collegiate team. South Bend AA was also recognized as Athletic Club champions of the West, with wins over Titan AA, Shamrock AC of South Bend, and Detroit AC. In the post-season, they played Rensselaer Athletic Club, who had been undefeated for three consecutive years, to a 0–0 tie.

== Schedule ==
Date	Time	Opponent	Site	Result	Attendance	Source
September 14		at Notre Dame	Cartier Field; South Bend, IN	T 0–0		
September 21		at Notre Dame	Cartier Field; South Bend, IN	W 5–0		
September 28		at Notre Dame	Cartier Field; South Bend, IN	T 0–0		
October 6		Chicago All-Americas	Springbrook Park; South Bend, IN	W 49–0		
October 13		Titan Athletic Association	Springbrook Park; South Bend, IN	W 33–0		
October 20		Chicago All-Stars	South Bend, IN	cancelled		
October 27		South Bend Shamrock Athletic Club	South Bend, IN	W 23–2		
November 6	3:00 p.m.	Detroit Athletic Club	Springbrook Park; South Bend, IN ("Western Athletic Club championship")	W 11–0		
November 10?		Chicago Naval Reserves	Springbrook Park; South Bend, IN	unknown		
November 17	3:00 p.m.	Sheridan (IN)	Springbrook Park; South Bend, IN	W 12–0	70+	
November		Peoria Athletic Club	Springbrook Park; South Bend, IN	unknown		
November 28		Notre Dame	Springbrook Park; South Bend, IN	L 6–22	2,000	
December 2		at Rensselaer Athletic Club	Rensselaer, IN (2nd Western Athletic Club championship)	T 0–0		

- The first three contests against Notre Dame were observed as practice games at the time, and Notre Dame only recognizes the September 28 contest as a match game.
