= Ernest White =

Ernest White may refer to:

- Ernest White (psychiatrist) (1851–1935), British psychiatrist
- Ernest White (political activist) (1892–1983), Australian timber merchant and political activist.
- Ernest C. White (1872–1926), American track athlete, college football player and coach, and osteopathic physician
