= Walter C. Booth =

American football player and coach (1874–1944)

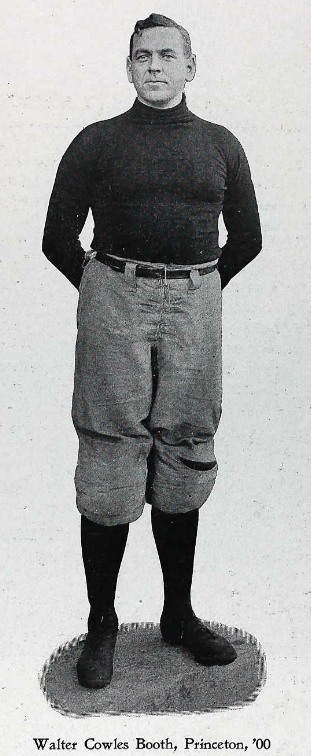

Biographical details
- Born: December 7, 1874
- Died: April 5, 1944 (aged 69); New York City, U.S.

Playing career
- 1899–1899: Princeton
- Position: Center

Coaching career (HC unless noted)
- 1900–1905: Nebraska

Head coaching record
- Overall: 46–8–1

Walter Cowles "Bummy" Booth (December 7, 1874 – April 5, 1944) was an American football coach. He served as the head football coach at the University of Nebraska–Lincoln from 1900 to 1905, compiling a record of 46–8–1. Booth led Nebraska to a perfect, shutout season in 1902. His teams achieved the longest winning streak in Nebraska football history with 27 victories including exhibition games, and the second longest with 24 victories excluding exhibition games. That streak remained unbroken until the 1995 Nebraska Cornhuskers extended their winning streak to 26 games.

== Coaching career ==
Booth turned Nebraska into an independent football powerhouse in the Midwest after coming off its first losing season in 1899. Alonzo Edwin Branch had left the program in 1899, making room for Booth to take over. The 1900 Nebraska football team would be the first to be officially called the Cornhuskers and had a record of 6–1–1, not counting two exhibition games. Every game that year was a shutout until the last game of the season with a 20–21 loss to Minnesota.

The 1901 Nebraska football team had a 6–2 record with several shutouts - including a 51–0 game against rival Missouri - and ended the season with a three-game winning streak.

The program had Nebraska's best season ever when in 1902 the team went undefeated, untied, and unscored upon for a perfect 9–0 record, excluding an exhibition against Lincoln High School with a score of 27–0. The team was led by John R. Bender and Charles Borg and had a 12-game winning streak.

In 1903 Nebraska continued its winning streak with a 10–0 record (not counting the 23–6 exhibition game victory over Lincoln High School). The winning streak was now 22 games (24 with exhibition games). One newspaper stated that "Nebraska occupies a unique position in western football, too strong to find fearful competitors; the Cornhuskers can almost weep with Alexander the Great because they have no more teams to conquer."

The 1904 Nebraska Cornhuskers team would win their first two games and one exhibition game before losing to Colorado to end a 24-game winning streak (27 including exhibition games). This streak remained a school record until the 1994 Nebraska Cornhuskers team had a 26-game winning streak before losing to Arizona State in 1996. The 1904 team would end the season with a 7–3 record, not counting two exhibition game victories.

Booth's final season was in 1905, which he finished with an 8–2 record, not counting one exhibition victory. The university's student newspaper stated that Booth "raised Nebraska from a second-rate team among those of the Missouri Valley to a position where even the leaders of the Conference look upon her as an opponent to be feared."

Booth's final record was 46–8–1 for a .845 winning percentage, a school record until Ewald O. Stiehm surpassed it with a 35–5–3 (.913) record from 1911 to 1915.

== Later life and death ==
Booth worked in the insurance business for many years with Big Bill Edwards, his former Princeton teammate, as a partner. Booth died on April 5, 1944 at Roosevelt Hospital in Manhattan.

== Head coaching record ==
Year	Team	Overall	Conference	Standing	Bowl/playoffs
Nebraska Cornhuskers (Independent) (1900–1905)
1900	Nebraska	6–1–1			
1901	Nebraska	6–2			
1902	Nebraska	9–0			
1903	Nebraska	10–0			
1904	Nebraska	7–3			
1905	Nebraska	8–2			
Nebraska:		46–8–1			
Total:		46–8–1			

Exhibition games are not counted
