= Henry S. Pratt =

American football and basketball coach

Biographical details
- Born: May 20, 1877; Lawrence, Massachusetts, U.S.
- Died: March 25, 1940 (aged 62); Andover, Massachusetts, U.S.

Playing career
- 1897–1899: Brown
- 1900: Duquesne Country and Athletic Club
- Position: Quarterback

Coaching career (HC unless noted)

Football
- 1901: Cincinnati

Basketball
- 1901–1902: Cincinnati

Head coaching record
- Overall: 1–4–1 (football); 5–4 (basketball)

Henry Selden Pratt (May 20, 1877 – March 25, 1940) was an American football player and coach of football and basketball. Pratt played quarterback for the Brown University football team, lettering in 1897–1899 and captaining the team in his senior year. In 1900, he played professional football for the Duquesne Country and Athletic Club. He served as the head football coach at the University of Cincinnati for one season in 1901, compiling a record of 1–4–1. Pratt was also the head basketball coach at Cincinnati during the same academic year, 1901–02, tallying a mark of 5–4.

== Head coaching record ==
=== Football ===
Year	Team	Overall	Conference	Standing	Bowl/playoffs
Cincinnati (Independent) (1901)
1901	Cincinnati	1–4–1			
Cincinnati:		1–4–1			
Total:		1–4–1			
