= John J. Dillon (baseball) =

American baseball player, American football player and coach

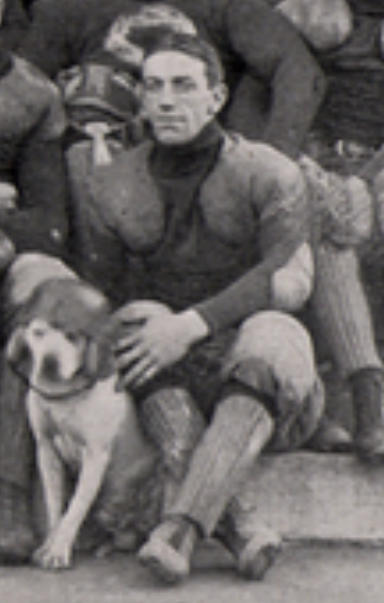

Playing career

Football
- 1898–1900: Syracuse

Baseball
- 1899–1901: Syracuse
- 1902: Rochester Bronchos
- 1902: Providence Grays
- 1903–1904: Jersey City Skeeters
- 1905: Amsterdam-Gloversville-Johnstown Jags
- 1906: Montreal Royals
- Positions: Quarterback (football); Catcher (baseball)

Coaching career (HC unless noted)

Football
- 1901: Case

Head coaching record
- Overall: 2–7

John J. Dillon was American college football player and coach and baseball player. Dillon was a two-sport athlete at Syracuse University, playing quarterback for the football team from 1898 to 1900 and catcher for the baseball team.

== Coaching career ==
Dillon coached the 1901 Case School of Applied Science football team to a 2–7 record, which included a win over rival Western Reserve University.

== Baseball career ==
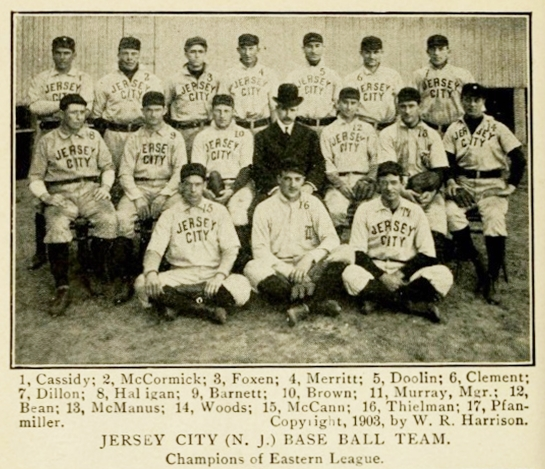
Dillon as a member of the 1903 Skeeters

Dillon played Minor League Baseball for five seasons on several teams, including on the championship 1903 Jersey City Skeeters.

== Personal life ==
Dillon performed in theater for several years, including as early as 1905 for "The Awakening of Mr. Pipp."

== Head coaching record ==
Year	Team	Overall	Conference	Standing	Bowl/playoffs
Case (Independent) (1901)
1901	Case	2–7			
Case:		2–7			
Total:		2–7			
