= Edgar M. Clinton =

American football player and coach (1877–1954)

Biographical details
- Born: May 21, 1877; Polo, Illinois, U.S.
- Died: December 3, 1954 (aged 77); Polo, Illinois, U.S.

Playing career
- 1896–1897: Illinois
- 1898: Stanford
- Position: Halfback

Coaching career (HC unless noted)
- 1900: Knox (IL)
- 1901: Iowa State

Head coaching record
- Overall: 8–10–2

Edgar M. Clinton (May 21, 1877 – December 3, 1954) was an American college football coach. He served as the head football coach at Knox College in Galesburg, Illinois in 1900 and at Iowa State College of Agricultural and Mechanic Arts —now known as Iowa State University—in 1901, compiling a career head coaching record of 8–10–2. A native of Polo, Illinois, Clinton played football at the University of Illinois at Urbana–Champaign in 1896 and at Stanford University in 1898.

== Head coaching record ==
Year	Team	Overall	Bowl/playoffs
Knox Old Siwash (Independent) (1900)
1900	Knox	6–4	
Knox:		6–4	
Iowa State Cyclones (Independent) (1901)
1901	Iowa State	2–6–2	
Iowa State:		2–6–2	
Total:		8–10–2	
