= John A. H. Keith =

American football and basketball coach, educator

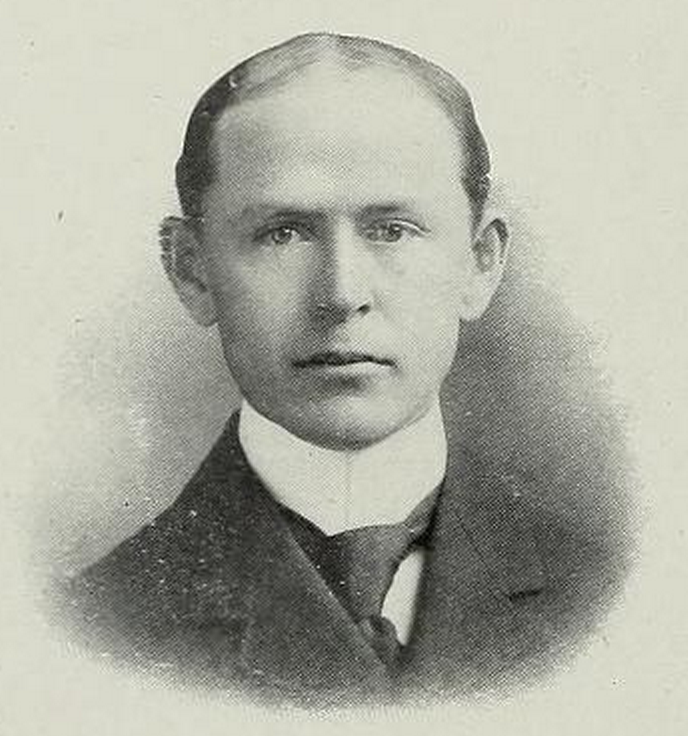
- Keith pictured in The Norther 1900, Northern Illinois yearbook

Biographical details
- Born: November 28, 1869; Homer, Illinois, U.S.
- Died: February 22, 1931 (aged 61); Harrisburg, Pennsylvania, U.S.
- Education: Illinois State Normal University (1894); Harvard College (A.M. 1900)

Playing career

Football
- 1899–1900: Northern Illinois State Normal
- Position: Quarterback

Coaching career (HC unless noted)

Football
- 1899–1903: Northern Illinois State Normal
- 1907: Illinois State

Basketball
- 1900–1902: Northern Illinois State Normal
- 1904–1905: Northern Illinois State Normal

Head coaching record
- Overall: 25–7–7 (football); 13–7 (basketball)

John Alexander Hull Keith (November 28, 1869 – February 22, 1931) was an American educator as well as an American football and basketball coach. He served as the head football coach at Northern Illinois State Normal School—now known as Northern Illinois University–from 1899 to 1903 and at Illinois State Normal University—now known as Illinois State University—in 1907, compiling a career college football record of 25–7–7. Keith was also the head basketball coach at Northern Illinois from 1900 to 1902 and again in 1904–05, tallying a mark of 13–7 in three seasons. He also taught at the school as a professor of pedagogy and as an assistant professor of psychology.

Keith died as his home in Harrisburg, Pennsylvania on February 22, 1931.

== Head coaching record ==
=== Football ===
Year	Team	Overall	Conference	Standing	Bowl/playoffs
Northern Illinois State Normal (Independent) (1899–1903)
1899	Northern Illinois State Normal	1–0–2			
1900	Northern Illinois State Normal	2–2–2			
1901	Northern Illinois State Normal	6–1			
1902	Northern Illinois State Normal	5–1–1			
1903	Northern Illinois State Normal	3–3			
Northern Illinois State Normal:		17–7–5			
Illinois State Redbirds (Independent) (1907)
1907	Illinois State	8–0–2			
Illinois State:		8–0–2			
Total:		25–7–7			
