= 1901 Notre Dame football team =

American college football season

1901 Notre Dame football
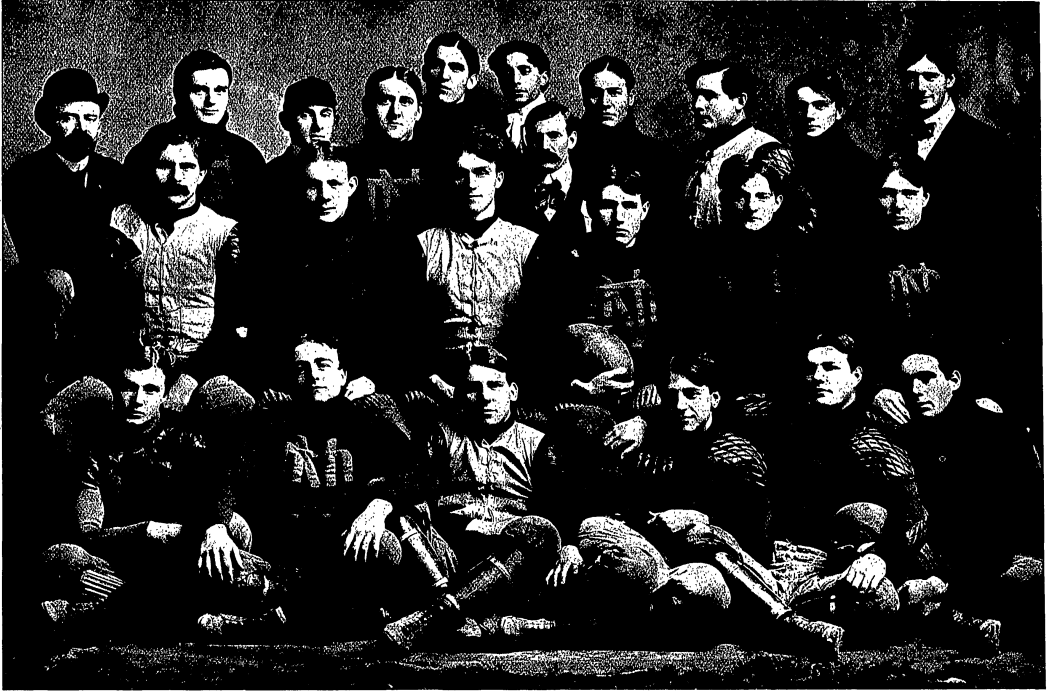

Indiana champion
- Conference: Independent
- Record: 8–1–1
- Head coach: Pat O'Dea (2nd season)
- Captain: Al Fortin
- Home stadium: Cartier Field

1901 Midwestern college football independents records
	Conf.			Overall
Team	W	L	T	W		L		T
Saint Louis		–		10	–	0	–	0
North Dakota Agricultural		–		7	–	0	–	0
Marquette		–		4	–	0	–	1
Northern Illinois State		–		6	–	1	–	0
Notre Dame		–		8	–	1	–	1
Ohio Wesleyan		–		8	–	2	–	0
Kirksville Osteopaths		–		10	–	3	–	0
Nebraska		–		6	–	2	–	0
Ohio		–		6	–	1	–	2
Doane		–		3	–	1	–	0
Haskell		–		6	–	2	–	0
Lake Forest		–		10	–	5	–	0
Ohio State		–		5	–	3	–	1
Washington University		–		5	–	3	–	1
Ohio Medical		–		5	–	3	–	1
Iowa State Normal		–		5	–	3	–	2
South Dakota Agricultural		–		3	–	2	–	0
Beloit		–		5	–	3	–	3
Washburn		–		3	–	2	–	3
Carthage		–		1	–	1	–	0
Drake		–		4	–	4	–	0
Detroit College		–		3	–	3	–	0
Mount Union		–		5	–	5	–	1
Wittenberg		–		4	–	4	–	0
Kansas State		–		3	–	4	–	1
Iowa State		–		2	–	6	–	2
Kansas		–		3	–	5	–	2
Wabash		–		4	–	7	–	0
Fairmount		–		3	–	6	–	0
Heidelberg		–		1	–	3	–	1
Miami (OH)		–		1	–	3	–	1
Cincinnati		–		1	–	4	–	1
Case		–		2	–	7	–	0
Missouri		–		1	–	6	–	1
Butler		–		0	–	1	–	0
Chicago Eclectic Medical		–		0	–	3	–	0

The 1901 Notre Dame football team was an American football team that represented the University of Notre Dame in the 1901 college football season. In its second season with Pat O'Dea as coach, the team compiled an 8–1–1 record, shut out six opponents, and outscored all opponents by a total of 145 to 19. Al Fortin was the team captain.

With victories over Purdue and Indiana, Notre Dame was declared to be the Indiana state champion. Only four of the games played were deemed "championship games": Northwestern, Beloit, Indiana, and Purdue.

Fullback Louis J. Salmon starred on the 1901 team. At a post-season meeting on November 29, 1901, Salmon was unanimously elected as captain of the 1902 Notre Dame football team. At the same meeting, varsity letters were presented to 14 players for their participation on the 1901 team: Lonergan, Lins and Nyere, ends; Faragher and Fortin, tackles; Gillen, Winters, Piele, O'Malley, guards; Pick, center; Henry J. McGlew, quarterback; Doran and Kirby, halfbacks; and Salmon, fullback.

== Schedule ==
Date	Opponent	Site	Result	Source
September 28	South Bend Athletic Association	Cartier Field; Notre Dame, IN	T 0–0	
October 5	at Ohio Medical	Neil Park; Columbus, OH	W 6–0	
October 12	at Northwestern	Sheppard Field; Evanston, IL (rivalry)	L 0–2	
October 19	Chicago Eclectic Medical	Cartier Field; Notre Dame, IN	W 32–0	
October 26	at Beloit	Keep Field; Beloit, WI	W 5–0	
November 2	Lake Forest	Cartier Field; Notre Dame, IN	W 16–0	
November 9	Purdue	Cartier Field; Notre Dame, IN (rivalry)	W 12–6	
November 16	Indiana	Cartier Field; Notre Dame, IN	W 18–5	
November 23	Chicago Physicians and Surgeons	Cartier Field; Notre Dame, IN	W 34–0	
November 28	South Bend Athletic Association	Springbrook Park; South Bend, IN	W 22–6	
