= Ernest C. White =

American athlete, coach, and physician (1872–1926)

Biographical details
- Born: March 12, 1872; Cohocton, New York, U.S.
- Died: 1926

Playing career

Football
- 1895–1896: Cornell
- 1897–1898: Buffalo
- Position: Guard

Coaching career (HC unless noted)

Football
- 1899: Missouri (assistant)
- 1900–1901: Kirksville Osteopaths

Head coaching record
- Overall: 17–5–1

Ernest Cleveland White (March 12, 1872 – 1926) was an American track athlete, college football player and coach, and osteopathic physician. He served as the head football coach at American School of Osteopathy—now known as A.T. Still University—in Kirksville, Missouri from 1900 to 1901.

A native of Elmira, New York, White attended Cornell University from 1895 to 1897, and was a member of the football and track teams. He then studied at medicine at the University of Buffalo, where he played football from 1897 to 1898 and was captain of the 1898 Buffalo football team. White coached football at the University of Missouri in 1899. He graduated from the medical department at Missouri in 1900.

White later practiced medicine in Watertown, New York and Paris. His patients included Theodore Roosevelt. White died in 1926.

== Head coaching record ==
Year	Team	Overall	Conference	Standing	Bowl/playoffs
Kirksville Osteopaths (Independent) (1900–1901)
1900	Kirksville Osteopaths	7–2–1			
1901	Kirksville Osteopaths	10–3			
Kirksville Osteopaths:		7–2			
Total:		17–5–1			
