= Ernest White (psychiatrist) =

British psychiatrist (1851–1935)

Lieutenant-Colonel Ernest White CBE

Professor of Psychological Medicine, King's College, London
- In office 1890–1910

Resident Physician-Superintendent, City of London Mental Hospital
- In office 1887–1905

Personal details
- Born: Ernest William White; 22 January 1851
- Died: 28 November 1935 (aged 84)

Lieutenant-Colonel Ernest William White CBE (22 January 1851 – 28 November 1935) was a British psychiatrist.

White was the second son of Richard White of Heathfield House, Norwich, and was educated at King Edward VI School, Bury St Edmunds. He won three scholarships and was a gold medallist in anatomy at King's College Hospital Medical School, from which he graduated with a first-class Bachelor of Medicine (MB) degree with honours in four subjects on 21 November 1883. He also trained at Norfolk and Norwich Hospital. He was admitted Member of the Royal College of Physicians (MRCP) on 12 November 1872.

From 1878 to 1887, he was senior assistant medical officer at the Kent Mental Hospital at Chartham, and from 1887 to 1905 he was resident physician-superintendent of the City of London Mental Hospital near Dartford. From 1890 to 1910, he was also professor of psychological medicine at King's College, being granted the title of emeritus professor on his retirement. From 1906 until his death, he was chairman of the private mental hospitals at Bailbrook House in Bath, Somerset, and Fenstanton in Tulse Hill, London. He was also president of the Royal Medico-Psychological Association.

On 21 December 1887, he was appointed acting surgeon of the 2nd Volunteer Battalion, Queen's Own (Royal West Kent Regiment), but resigned on 28 November 1891. In World War I he served as consultant in mental diseases to Western Command from 1916 to 1921 and to the War Office from 1919 to 1921. He was commissioned into the Royal Army Medical Corps on 5 January 1917 as a temporary honorary major and promoted lieutenant-colonel on 12 October 1917. The honorary status of his commission was removed on 1 July 1918. He was appointed Officer of the Order of the British Empire (OBE) in the 1919 Birthday Honours and Commander of the Order of the British Empire (CBE) on 1 January 1920. He resigned his commission on 24 February 1921, but was allowed to retain his rank.

White retired to Betley House in the village of Bayston Hill, near Shrewsbury, Shropshire. There he acquired an interest in farming and was chairman of the Shropshire Chamber of Agriculture in 1922 and 1923. An enthusiastic cricketer and cyclist in his younger days, he continued to engage in shooting and fly fishing. He was a member of the Constitutional Club.

He died on 28 November 1935 at the age of 84, leaving an estate worth £34,310. He left £500 to King's College Hospital Medical School to establish an annual prize for the most successful student in psychological medicine.
