= 1901 Saint Louis Blue and White football team =

American college football season

1901 Saint Louis Blue and White football
- Conference: Independent
- Record: 10–0
- Head coach: Martin Delaney (3rd season)
- Home stadium: Handlan's Park

1901 Midwestern college football independents records
	Conf.			Overall
Team	W	L	T	W		L		T
Saint Louis		–		10	–	0	–	0
North Dakota Agricultural		–		7	–	0	–	0
Marquette		–		4	–	0	–	1
Northern Illinois State		–		6	–	1	–	0
Notre Dame		–		8	–	1	–	1
Ohio Wesleyan		–		8	–	2	–	0
Kirksville Osteopaths		–		10	–	3	–	0
Nebraska		–		6	–	2	–	0
Ohio		–		6	–	1	–	2
Doane		–		3	–	1	–	0
Haskell		–		6	–	2	–	0
Lake Forest		–		10	–	5	–	0
Ohio State		–		5	–	3	–	1
Washington University		–		5	–	3	–	1
Ohio Medical		–		5	–	3	–	1
Iowa State Normal		–		5	–	3	–	2
South Dakota Agricultural		–		3	–	2	–	0
Beloit		–		5	–	3	–	3
Washburn		–		3	–	2	–	3
Carthage		–		1	–	1	–	0
Drake		–		4	–	4	–	0
Detroit College		–		3	–	3	–	0
Mount Union		–		5	–	5	–	1
Wittenberg		–		4	–	4	–	0
Kansas State		–		3	–	4	–	1
Iowa State		–		2	–	6	–	2
Kansas		–		3	–	5	–	2
Wabash		–		4	–	7	–	0
Fairmount		–		3	–	6	–	0
Heidelberg		–		1	–	3	–	1
Miami (OH)		–		1	–	3	–	1
Cincinnati		–		1	–	4	–	1
Case		–		2	–	7	–	0
Missouri		–		1	–	6	–	1
Butler		–		0	–	1	–	0
Chicago Eclectic Medical		–		0	–	3	–	0

The 1901 Saint Louis Blue and White football team was an American football team that represented Saint Louis University as an independent during the 1901 college football season. In their third season under head coach Martin Delaney, the team compiled a 10–0 record and outscored opponents by a total of 233 to 14. The team played its home games at Handlan's Park in St. Louis.

== Schedule ==
Date	Time	Opponent	Site	Result	Source
October 5	3:00 p.m.	West End Club	Handlan's Park; St. Louis, MO	W 17–0	
October 10	3:00 p.m.	Manual Training School	Handlan's Park; St. Louis, MO	W 31–0	
October 12	3:00 p.m.	St. Louis University High School	Handlan's Park; St. Louis, MO	W 25–0	
October 19	3:00 p.m.	Smith Academy	Handlan's Park; St. Louis, MO	W 30–0	
October 26	3:00 p.m.	Barnes Medics	Handlan's Park; St. Louis, MO	W 11–6	
November 2	3:00 p.m.	McKendree	Handlan's Park; St. Louis, MO	W 12–0 (forfeit)	
November 9	3:00 p.m.	Glen Carbon	Handlan's Park; St. Louis, MO	W 59–0	
November 16	3:00 p.m.	Marion-Sims	Handlan's Park; St. Louis, MO	W 8–0	
November 23	3:00 p.m.	East St. Louis High School alumni	Handlan's Park; St. Louis, MO	W 15–0	
November 28	3:00 p.m.	McKendree	Handlan's Park; St. Louis, MO	W 25–8	
