= 1901 Cincinnati football team =

American college football season

1901 Cincinnati football
- Conference: Independent
- Record: 1–4–1
- Head coach: Henry S. Pratt (1st season)
- Captain: Adolph Fennell
- Home stadium: University athletic field, Burnet Woods

1901 Midwestern college football independents records
	Conf.			Overall
Team	W	L	T	W		L		T
Saint Louis		–		10	–	0	–	0
North Dakota Agricultural		–		7	–	0	–	0
Marquette		–		4	–	0	–	1
Northern Illinois State		–		6	–	1	–	0
Notre Dame		–		8	–	1	–	1
Ohio Wesleyan		–		8	–	2	–	0
Kirksville Osteopaths		–		10	–	3	–	0
Nebraska		–		6	–	2	–	0
Ohio		–		6	–	1	–	2
Doane		–		3	–	1	–	0
Haskell		–		6	–	2	–	0
Lake Forest		–		10	–	5	–	0
Ohio State		–		5	–	3	–	1
Washington University		–		5	–	3	–	1
Ohio Medical		–		5	–	3	–	1
Iowa State Normal		–		5	–	3	–	2
South Dakota Agricultural		–		3	–	2	–	0
Beloit		–		5	–	3	–	3
Washburn		–		3	–	2	–	3
Carthage		–		1	–	1	–	0
Drake		–		4	–	4	–	0
Detroit College		–		3	–	3	–	0
Mount Union		–		5	–	5	–	1
Wittenberg		–		4	–	4	–	0
Kansas State		–		3	–	4	–	1
Iowa State		–		2	–	6	–	2
Kansas		–		3	–	5	–	2
Wabash		–		4	–	7	–	0
Fairmount		–		3	–	6	–	0
Heidelberg		–		1	–	3	–	1
Miami (OH)		–		1	–	3	–	1
Cincinnati		–		1	–	4	–	1
Case		–		2	–	7	–	0
Missouri		–		1	–	6	–	1
Butler		–		0	–	1	–	0
Chicago Eclectic Medical		–		0	–	3	–	0

The 1901 Cincinnati football team was an American football team that represented the University of Cincinnati as an independent during 1901 college football season. Led by Henry S. Pratt in his first and only season as head coach, Cincinnati compiled a record of 1–4–1.

== Schedule ==
Date	Opponent	Site	Result	Source
October 12	at Kentucky State College	Lexington, KY	T 0–0	
October 26	at Wittenberg	Springfield, OH	L 0–18	
November 2	Ohio	University athletic field, Burnet Woods; Cincinnati, OH	L 0–16	
November 9	Hanover	Cincinnati, OH	W 10–0	
November 16	at Avondale Athletic Club	Avondale Field; Cincinnati, OH	L 0–13	
November 28	at Kentucky State College	Lexington, KY	L 0–16	
