= 1901 Ohio Green and White football team =

American college football season

1901 Ohio Green and White football
- Conference: Independent
- Record: 6–1–2
- Head coach: Arlie C. Jones (1st season)

1901 Midwestern college football independents records
	Conf.			Overall
Team	W	L	T	W		L		T
Saint Louis		–		10	–	0	–	0
North Dakota Agricultural		–		7	–	0	–	0
Marquette		–		4	–	0	–	1
Northern Illinois State		–		6	–	1	–	0
Notre Dame		–		8	–	1	–	1
Ohio Wesleyan		–		8	–	2	–	0
Kirksville Osteopaths		–		10	–	3	–	0
Nebraska		–		6	–	2	–	0
Ohio		–		6	–	1	–	2
Doane		–		3	–	1	–	0
Haskell		–		6	–	2	–	0
Lake Forest		–		10	–	5	–	0
Ohio State		–		5	–	3	–	1
Washington University		–		5	–	3	–	1
Ohio Medical		–		5	–	3	–	1
Iowa State Normal		–		5	–	3	–	2
South Dakota Agricultural		–		3	–	2	–	0
Beloit		–		5	–	3	–	3
Washburn		–		3	–	2	–	3
Carthage		–		1	–	1	–	0
Drake		–		4	–	4	–	0
Detroit College		–		3	–	3	–	0
Mount Union		–		5	–	5	–	1
Wittenberg		–		4	–	4	–	0
Kansas State		–		3	–	4	–	1
Iowa State		–		2	–	6	–	2
Kansas		–		3	–	5	–	2
Wabash		–		4	–	7	–	0
Fairmount		–		3	–	6	–	0
Heidelberg		–		1	–	3	–	1
Miami (OH)		–		1	–	3	–	1
Cincinnati		–		1	–	4	–	1
Case		–		2	–	7	–	0
Missouri		–		1	–	6	–	1
Butler		–		0	–	1	–	0
Chicago Eclectic Medical		–		0	–	3	–	0

The 1901 Ohio Green and White football team was an American football team that represented Ohio University as an independent during the 1901 college football season. Led by Arlie C. Jones in his first and only season as head coach, the team compiled a 6–1–2 record and outscored opponents by a total of 108 to 43.

== Schedule ==
Date	Opponent	Site	Result	Attendance	Source
September 28	Ohio Wesleyan	Delaware, OH	W 6–5		
October 5	Parkersburg Athletic Club	Athens, OH	W 35–0		
October 12	at Ohio State	Ohio Field; Columbus, OH	L 0–17		
October 19	at Denison	Newark, OH	W 12–0		
October 26	Marietta	Athens, OH	W 11–5		
November 2	at Cincinnati	University athletic field, Burnet Woods; Cincinnati, OH	W 16–0		
November 16	at Otterbein	Westerville, OH	T 0–0		
November 23	Muskingum	Athens, OH	W 17–5		
November 28	at Marietta	Marietta, OH	T 11–11	6,000	
