= 1901 Kirksville Osteopaths football team =

American college football season

1901 Kirksville Osteopaths football
- Conference: Independent
- Record: 10–3
- Head coach: Ernest C. White (2nd season)
- Captain: Van Doren

1901 Midwestern college football independents records
	Conf.			Overall
Team	W	L	T	W		L		T
Saint Louis		–		10	–	0	–	0
North Dakota Agricultural		–		7	–	0	–	0
Marquette		–		4	–	0	–	1
Northern Illinois State		–		6	–	1	–	0
Notre Dame		–		8	–	1	–	1
Ohio Wesleyan		–		8	–	2	–	0
Kirksville Osteopaths		–		10	–	3	–	0
Nebraska		–		6	–	2	–	0
Ohio		–		6	–	1	–	2
Doane		–		3	–	1	–	0
Haskell		–		6	–	2	–	0
Lake Forest		–		10	–	5	–	0
Ohio State		–		5	–	3	–	1
Washington University		–		5	–	3	–	1
Ohio Medical		–		5	–	3	–	1
Iowa State Normal		–		5	–	3	–	2
South Dakota Agricultural		–		3	–	2	–	0
Beloit		–		5	–	3	–	3
Washburn		–		3	–	2	–	3
Carthage		–		1	–	1	–	0
Drake		–		4	–	4	–	0
Detroit College		–		3	–	3	–	0
Mount Union		–		5	–	5	–	1
Wittenberg		–		4	–	4	–	0
Kansas State		–		3	–	4	–	1
Iowa State		–		2	–	6	–	2
Kansas		–		3	–	5	–	2
Wabash		–		4	–	7	–	0
Fairmount		–		3	–	6	–	0
Heidelberg		–		1	–	3	–	1
Miami (OH)		–		1	–	3	–	1
Cincinnati		–		1	–	4	–	1
Case		–		2	–	7	–	0
Missouri		–		1	–	6	–	1
Butler		–		0	–	1	–	0
Chicago Eclectic Medical		–		0	–	3	–	0

The 1901 Kirksville Osteopaths football team was an American football team that represented the American School of Osteopathy—now known as A.T. Still University—as an independent during the 1901 college football season. Led by Ernest C. White in his second and final year as head coach, the team compiled a record 10–3.

== Schedule ==
Date	Time	Opponent	Site	Result	Attendance	Source
September		Kirksville All-Stars		W 11–0		
September		Saint Joseph Medical		W 46–0		
September 28		Nebraska	Kirksville, MO	L 0–5	1,000	
October 5		at Missouri	Rollins Field; Columbia, MO	W 22–5	3,000	
October 14		Kansas	Kirksville, MO	L 6–17		
October 19		Haskell	Kirksville, MO	L 5–36		
October 26		Gem City Business College	Kirksville, MO	W 40–0		
October 30		Tarkio	Kirksville, MO	W 28–0		
November 4		at Ottawa (KS)	Ottawa, KS	W 39–0		
November 11		Highland Park (IA)	Kirksville, MO	W 64–0		
November 15	3:00 p.m.	at Christian Brothers (MO)	Christian Brothers College campus; St. Louis, MO	W 11–6		
November 20		Texas	Kirksville, MO	W 48–0		
November 28		Missouri Mines	Kirksville, MO	W 58–0		
