= 1901 Northern Illinois State Normal football team =

American college football season

1901 Northern Illinois State Normal football
- Conference: Independent
- Record: 6–1
- Head coach: John A. H. Keith (3rd season)
- Captain: Henry Hausen

1901 Midwestern college football independents records
	Conf.			Overall
Team	W	L	T	W		L		T
Saint Louis		–		10	–	0	–	0
North Dakota Agricultural		–		7	–	0	–	0
Marquette		–		4	–	0	–	1
Northern Illinois State		–		6	–	1	–	0
Notre Dame		–		8	–	1	–	1
Ohio Wesleyan		–		8	–	2	–	0
Kirksville Osteopaths		–		10	–	3	–	0
Nebraska		–		6	–	2	–	0
Ohio		–		6	–	1	–	2
Doane		–		3	–	1	–	0
Haskell		–		6	–	2	–	0
Lake Forest		–		10	–	5	–	0
Ohio State		–		5	–	3	–	1
Washington University		–		5	–	3	–	1
Ohio Medical		–		5	–	3	–	1
Iowa State Normal		–		5	–	3	–	2
South Dakota Agricultural		–		3	–	2	–	0
Beloit		–		5	–	3	–	3
Washburn		–		3	–	2	–	3
Carthage		–		1	–	1	–	0
Drake		–		4	–	4	–	0
Detroit College		–		3	–	3	–	0
Mount Union		–		5	–	5	–	1
Wittenberg		–		4	–	4	–	0
Kansas State		–		3	–	4	–	1
Iowa State		–		2	–	6	–	2
Kansas		–		3	–	5	–	2
Wabash		–		4	–	7	–	0
Fairmount		–		3	–	6	–	0
Heidelberg		–		1	–	3	–	1
Miami (OH)		–		1	–	3	–	1
Cincinnati		–		1	–	4	–	1
Case		–		2	–	7	–	0
Missouri		–		1	–	6	–	1
Butler		–		0	–	1	–	0
Chicago Eclectic Medical		–		0	–	3	–	0

The 1901 Northern Illinois State Normal football team represented Northern Illinois State Normal College as an independent in the 1901 college football season. They were led by third-year head coach John A. H. Keith. The team finished the season with a 6–1 record. Henry Hausen was the team's captain.

== Schedule ==
Date	Opponent	Site	Result	Source
October 5	at Sandwich High School	Sandwich, IL	W 23–0	
October 12	Sandwich High School	DeKalb, IL	W 21–0	
October 19	at Elgin High School	Elgin, IL	W 10–0	
November 2	North-Western College	DeKalb, IL	W 10–0	
November 9	Plano High School	DeKalb, IL	W 29–0	
November 16	at North-Western College	Naperville, IL	W 17–6	
November 28	Whitewater State	DeKalb, IL	L 0–12	
