= 1901 Haskell Indians football team =

American college football season

1901 Haskell Indians football
- Conference: Independent
- Record: 6–2
- Head coach: Alfred G. Ellick (2nd season)

1901 Midwestern college football independents records
	Conf.			Overall
Team	W	L	T	W		L		T
Saint Louis		–		10	–	0	–	0
North Dakota Agricultural		–		7	–	0	–	0
Marquette		–		4	–	0	–	1
Northern Illinois State		–		6	–	1	–	0
Notre Dame		–		8	–	1	–	1
Ohio Wesleyan		–		8	–	2	–	0
Kirksville Osteopaths		–		10	–	3	–	0
Nebraska		–		6	–	2	–	0
Ohio		–		6	–	1	–	2
Doane		–		3	–	1	–	0
Haskell		–		6	–	2	–	0
Lake Forest		–		10	–	5	–	0
Ohio State		–		5	–	3	–	1
Washington University		–		5	–	3	–	1
Ohio Medical		–		5	–	3	–	1
Iowa State Normal		–		5	–	3	–	2
South Dakota Agricultural		–		3	–	2	–	0
Beloit		–		5	–	3	–	3
Washburn		–		3	–	2	–	3
Carthage		–		1	–	1	–	0
Drake		–		4	–	4	–	0
Detroit College		–		3	–	3	–	0
Mount Union		–		5	–	5	–	1
Wittenberg		–		4	–	4	–	0
Kansas State		–		3	–	4	–	1
Iowa State		–		2	–	6	–	2
Kansas		–		3	–	5	–	2
Wabash		–		4	–	7	–	0
Fairmount		–		3	–	6	–	0
Heidelberg		–		1	–	3	–	1
Miami (OH)		–		1	–	3	–	1
Cincinnati		–		1	–	4	–	1
Case		–		2	–	7	–	0
Missouri		–		1	–	6	–	1
Butler		–		0	–	1	–	0
Chicago Eclectic Medical		–		0	–	3	–	0

The 1901 Haskell Indians football team was an American football team that represented the Haskell Indian Institute (now known as Haskell Indian Nations University) as an independent during the 1901 college football season. In its second season under head coach Alfred G. Ellick, Haskell compiled a 6–2 record and outscored opponents by a total of 165 to 58. The team's victories included games against Kansas and Missouri; its losses were to Minnesota and Nebraska.

Archiquette was the team captain. At the end of the 1901 season, four Haskell players were named to the All-Kansas football team: Carl at center; Redwater at guard; Bain at tackle; and Achiquette at end. Haskell's backfield included Dugan, Fallis, and Oliver at halfback, Miguel at fullback, and Bent and Fallis at quarterback.

Haskell was one of three Native American schools in 1901 to field football teams that competed in college football. The other two were Carlisle in Pennsylvania and Chilocco in the Oklahoma Territory.

== Schedule ==
Date	Opponent	Site	Result	Attendance	Source
September 28	Kansas City Medics	Lawrence, KS	W 18–2		
October 7	at Ottawa (KS)	Ottawa University campus; Ottawa, KS	W 28–0		
October 19	at Kirksville Osteopaths	Kirksville, MO	W 36–5		
November 4	at Minnesota	Northrop Field; Minneapolis, MN	L 0–28	2,000	
November 9	at Kansas	McCook Field; Lawrence, KS	W 18–5	1,200	
November 18	at Missouri	Rollins Field; Columbia, MO	W 19–0		
November 28	at Nebraska	Antelope Field; Lincoln, NE	L 10–18	> 4,000	
December 2	at Ensworth Medics	St. Joseph, MO	W 36–0		
