= 1901 North Dakota Agricultural Aggies football team =

American college football season

1901 North Dakota Agricultural Aggies football
- Conference: Independent
- Record: 7–0
- Head coach: Jack Harrison (2nd season)
- Captain: T. F. Manns

1901 Midwestern college football independents records
	Conf.			Overall
Team	W	L	T	W		L		T
Saint Louis		–		10	–	0	–	0
North Dakota Agricultural		–		7	–	0	–	0
Marquette		–		4	–	0	–	1
Northern Illinois State		–		6	–	1	–	0
Notre Dame		–		8	–	1	–	1
Ohio Wesleyan		–		8	–	2	–	0
Kirksville Osteopaths		–		10	–	3	–	0
Nebraska		–		6	–	2	–	0
Ohio		–		6	–	1	–	2
Doane		–		3	–	1	–	0
Haskell		–		6	–	2	–	0
Lake Forest		–		10	–	5	–	0
Ohio State		–		5	–	3	–	1
Washington University		–		5	–	3	–	1
Ohio Medical		–		5	–	3	–	1
Iowa State Normal		–		5	–	3	–	2
South Dakota Agricultural		–		3	–	2	–	0
Beloit		–		5	–	3	–	3
Washburn		–		3	–	2	–	3
Carthage		–		1	–	1	–	0
Drake		–		4	–	4	–	0
Detroit College		–		3	–	3	–	0
Mount Union		–		5	–	5	–	1
Wittenberg		–		4	–	4	–	0
Kansas State		–		3	–	4	–	1
Iowa State		–		2	–	6	–	2
Kansas		–		3	–	5	–	2
Wabash		–		4	–	7	–	0
Fairmount		–		3	–	6	–	0
Heidelberg		–		1	–	3	–	1
Miami (OH)		–		1	–	3	–	1
Cincinnati		–		1	–	4	–	1
Case		–		2	–	7	–	0
Missouri		–		1	–	6	–	1
Butler		–		0	–	1	–	0
Chicago Eclectic Medical		–		0	–	3	–	0

The 1901 North Dakota Agricultural Aggies football team was an American football team that represented North Dakota Agricultural College (now known as North Dakota State University) as an independent during the 1901 college football season. In its second and final season under head coach Jack Harrison, the team compiled a 7–0 record and outscored opponents by a total of 261 to 17.

The season was part of a three-year, 17-game winning streak that began on November 19, 1900, and ended on November 21, 1903.

== Schedule ==
Date	Opponent	Site	Result
September 21	at Fargo High School	Fargo, ND	W 17–0
September 28	at Moorhead Normal	Moorhead, MN	W 65–0
October 5	at Red River Valley	Wahpeton, ND	W 60–0
October 12	at Hamline	Saint Paul, MN	W 34–6
October 18	Minnesota freshmen	Fargo, ND	W 17–0
October 29	Fargo	Fargo, ND	W 51–0
November 2	at North Dakota	Grand Forks, ND (rivalry)	W 17–11
