= 1901 Iowa State Cyclones football team =

American college football season

1901 Iowa State Cyclones football
- Conference: Independent
- Record: 2–6–2
- Head coach: Edgar M. Clinton (1st season)
- Captain: William Scholty
- Home stadium: State Field

1901 Midwestern college football independents records
| | Conf. | | | Overall |
| Team | W | L | T | W | | L | | T |
|---|---|---|---|---|---|---|---|---|
| Saint Louis | | – | | 10 | – | 0 | – | 0 |
| North Dakota Agricultural | | – | | 7 | – | 0 | – | 0 |
| Marquette | | – | | 4 | – | 0 | – | 1 |
| Northern Illinois State | | – | | 6 | – | 1 | – | 0 |
| Notre Dame | | – | | 8 | – | 1 | – | 1 |
| Ohio Wesleyan | | – | | 8 | – | 2 | – | 0 |
| Kirksville Osteopaths | | – | | 10 | – | 3 | – | 0 |
| Nebraska | | – | | 6 | – | 2 | – | 0 |
| Ohio | | – | | 6 | – | 1 | – | 2 |
| Doane | | – | | 3 | – | 1 | – | 0 |
| Haskell | | – | | 6 | – | 2 | – | 0 |
| Lake Forest | | – | | 10 | – | 5 | – | 0 |
| Ohio State | | – | | 5 | – | 3 | – | 1 |
| Washington University | | – | | 5 | – | 3 | – | 1 |
| Ohio Medical | | – | | 5 | – | 3 | – | 1 |
| Iowa State Normal | | – | | 5 | – | 3 | – | 2 |
| South Dakota Agricultural | | – | | 3 | – | 2 | – | 0 |
| Beloit | | – | | 5 | – | 3 | – | 3 |
| Washburn | | – | | 3 | – | 2 | – | 3 |
| Carthage | | – | | 1 | – | 1 | – | 0 |
| Drake | | – | | 4 | – | 4 | – | 0 |
| Detroit College | | – | | 3 | – | 3 | – | 0 |
| Mount Union | | – | | 5 | – | 5 | – | 1 |
| Wittenberg | | – | | 4 | – | 4 | – | 0 |
| Kansas State | | – | | 3 | – | 4 | – | 1 |
| Iowa State | | – | | 2 | – | 6 | – | 2 |
| Kansas | | – | | 3 | – | 5 | – | 2 |
| Wabash | | – | | 4 | – | 7 | – | 0 |
| Fairmount | | – | | 3 | – | 6 | – | 0 |
| Heidelberg | | – | | 1 | – | 3 | – | 1 |
| Miami (OH) | | – | | 1 | – | 3 | – | 1 |
| Cincinnati | | – | | 1 | – | 4 | – | 1 |
| Case | | – | | 2 | – | 7 | – | 0 |
| Missouri | | – | | 1 | – | 6 | – | 1 |
| Butler | | – | | 0 | – | 1 | – | 0 |
| Chicago Eclectic Medical | | – | | 0 | – | 3 | – | 0 |

The 1901 Iowa State Cyclones football team was an American football team that represented Iowa State College of Agricultural and Mechanic Arts (later renamed Iowa State University) as an independent during the 1901 college football season. In its first and only season under head coach Edgar M. Clinton, the team compiled a 2–6–2 record and was outscored by a total of 133 to 56. William Scholty was the team captain.

Between 1892 and 1913, the football team played on State Field on land that later became the site of the university's Parks Library.

== Schedule ==
| Date | Time | Opponent | Site | Result | Attendance | Source |
|---|---|---|---|---|---|---|
| September 28 | | vs. Grinnell | Marshalltown, IA | T 0–0 | | |
| October 5 | | Still | State Field; Ames, IA | W 23–0 | | |
| October 12 | | at Iowa State Normal | Cedar Falls, IA | T 0–0 | | |
| October 18 | | at Iowa | Iowa Field; Iowa City, IA (rivalry) | L 0–12 | | |
| October 26 | | at Nebraska | Antelope Field; Lincoln, NE (rivalry) | L 0–17 | | |
| November 2 | | Grinnell | State Field; Ames, IA | L 0–23 | 1,200 | |
| November 9 | | at Wisconsin | Randall Field; Madison, WI | L 0–45 | | |
| November 16 | 2:30 p.m. | Drake | State Field; Ames, IA | L 5–12 | | |
| November 21 | | Cornell (IA) | State Field; Ames, IA | W 28–12 | | |
| November 28 | | at Simpson | Simpson Field; Indianola, IA | L 0–12 | 1,200 | |
All times are in Central time
