= Playland Park (Indiana) =

Former amusement park in South Bend, Indiana

Coordinates: 41.659°N 86.218°W

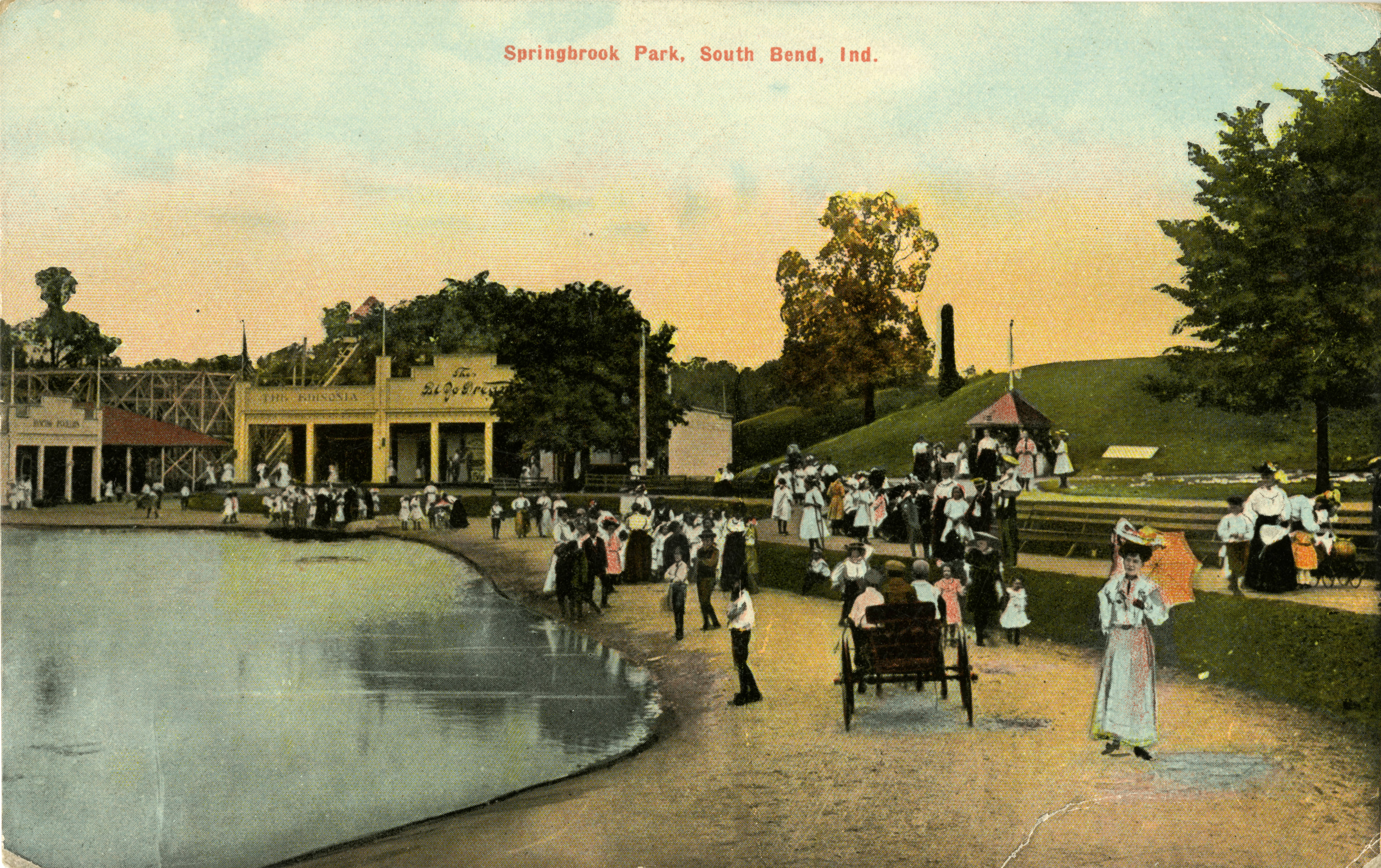
- Springbrook Park circa 1910
- Interactive map of Playland Park
- Type: Urban park
- Location: South Bend, Indiana, United States
- Area: 35 acres (14 ha)
- Created: 1880
- Closed: 1961
- Status: Defunct

Playland Park was an amusement park located in South Bend, Indiana. It was bounded by the St. Joseph River, Ironwood Drive, and Lincolnway East.

== History ==
Playland Park started as a trolley park in 1880, originally called Springbrook Park. By 1912 it had a Casino, an exhibition hall and a roller coaster.

In 1916 a race track was added. In 1924 Pete Redden became manager of the park. He held a contest and the park was renamed "Playland Park" and the roller coaster was renamed the "Jack Rabbit".

Besides being an amusement park, the park also had a baseball field. The South Bend Benders minor league teams and South Bend Blue Sox of the All-American Girls Professional Baseball League played most of their games there.

A NASCAR race was held on track July 20, 1952. The race was won by Tim Flock with Lee Petty second. Herb Thomas won the pole.

The grandstand also had horse racing and fireworks. The park hosted the 4-H Fair for many years.

The park had a dance hall that hosted many bands such as Cab Calloway, Duke Ellington and Ozzie Nelson drawing 2,000 to 3,000 people on the weekends.

In 1961, Playland Park closed and was turned into a lighted par-3 golf course. That closed after 40 years.

It is now student housing for Indiana University South Bend. Only the concrete from the grandstands remains from the park.
