= 1901 Kansas Jayhawks football team =

American college football season

1901 Kansas Jayhawks football
- Conference: Independent
- Record: 3–5–2
- Head coach: John H. Outland (1st season)
- Captain: Julian Jenkinson
- Home stadium: McCook Field

1901 Midwestern college football independents records
| | Conf. | | | Overall |
| Team | W | L | T | W | | L | | T |
|---|---|---|---|---|---|---|---|---|
| Saint Louis | | – | | 10 | – | 0 | – | 0 |
| North Dakota Agricultural | | – | | 7 | – | 0 | – | 0 |
| Marquette | | – | | 4 | – | 0 | – | 1 |
| Northern Illinois State | | – | | 6 | – | 1 | – | 0 |
| Notre Dame | | – | | 8 | – | 1 | – | 1 |
| Ohio Wesleyan | | – | | 8 | – | 2 | – | 0 |
| Kirksville Osteopaths | | – | | 10 | – | 3 | – | 0 |
| Nebraska | | – | | 6 | – | 2 | – | 0 |
| Ohio | | – | | 6 | – | 1 | – | 2 |
| Doane | | – | | 3 | – | 1 | – | 0 |
| Haskell | | – | | 6 | – | 2 | – | 0 |
| Lake Forest | | – | | 10 | – | 5 | – | 0 |
| Ohio State | | – | | 5 | – | 3 | – | 1 |
| Washington University | | – | | 5 | – | 3 | – | 1 |
| Ohio Medical | | – | | 5 | – | 3 | – | 1 |
| Iowa State Normal | | – | | 5 | – | 3 | – | 2 |
| South Dakota Agricultural | | – | | 3 | – | 2 | – | 0 |
| Beloit | | – | | 5 | – | 3 | – | 3 |
| Washburn | | – | | 3 | – | 2 | – | 3 |
| Carthage | | – | | 1 | – | 1 | – | 0 |
| Drake | | – | | 4 | – | 4 | – | 0 |
| Detroit College | | – | | 3 | – | 3 | – | 0 |
| Mount Union | | – | | 5 | – | 5 | – | 1 |
| Wittenberg | | – | | 4 | – | 4 | – | 0 |
| Kansas State | | – | | 3 | – | 4 | – | 1 |
| Iowa State | | – | | 2 | – | 6 | – | 2 |
| Kansas | | – | | 3 | – | 5 | – | 2 |
| Wabash | | – | | 4 | – | 7 | – | 0 |
| Fairmount | | – | | 3 | – | 6 | – | 0 |
| Heidelberg | | – | | 1 | – | 3 | – | 1 |
| Miami (OH) | | – | | 1 | – | 3 | – | 1 |
| Cincinnati | | – | | 1 | – | 4 | – | 1 |
| Case | | – | | 2 | – | 7 | – | 0 |
| Missouri | | – | | 1 | – | 6 | – | 1 |
| Butler | | – | | 0 | – | 1 | – | 0 |
| Chicago Eclectic Medical | | – | | 0 | – | 3 | – | 0 |

The 1901 Kansas Jayhawks football team was an American football team that represented the University of Kansas as an independent during the 1901 college football season. In its first and only season under head coach John H. Outland (namesake of the Outland Trophy), the team compiled a 3–5–2 record and was outscored by a total of 147 to 92.

== Schedule ==
| Date | Opponent | Site | Result | Attendance | Source |
|---|---|---|---|---|---|
| September 29 | Ottawa | McCook Field; Lawrence, KS | L 5–16 | | |
| October 5 | Kansas State Normal | McCook Field; Lawrence, KS | W 36–10 | | |
| October 14 | at Kirksville Osteopaths | Kirksville, MO | W 17–6 | | |
| October 19 | at Washburn | Topeka, KS | T 0–0 | 1,500 | |
| October 26 | at Wisconsin | Randall Field; Madison, WI | L 0–50 | | |
| October 29 | at Beloit | Keep Athletic Field; Beloit, WI | T 0–0 | | |
| November 9 | Haskell | McCook Field; Lawrence, KS | L 5–18 | 1,200 | |
| November 16 | at Nebraska | Antelope Field; Lincoln, NE (rivalry) | L 5–29 | 4,000 | |
| November 23 | Texas | McCook Field; Lawrence, KS | W 12–0 | 600 | |
| November 28 | vs. Missouri | Exposition Park; Kansas City, MO (rivalry) | L 12–18 | 7,000 | |
