= 1901 Washington University football team =

American college football season

1901 Washington University football
- Conference: Independent
- Record: 5–3–1
- Head coach: Maurice Gordon Clarke (1st season)
- Home stadium: Athletic Park

1901 Midwestern college football independents records
	Conf.			Overall
Team	W	L	T	W		L		T
Saint Louis		–		10	–	0	–	0
North Dakota Agricultural		–		7	–	0	–	0
Marquette		–		4	–	0	–	1
Northern Illinois State		–		6	–	1	–	0
Notre Dame		–		8	–	1	–	1
Ohio Wesleyan		–		8	–	2	–	0
Kirksville Osteopaths		–		10	–	3	–	0
Nebraska		–		6	–	2	–	0
Ohio		–		6	–	1	–	2
Doane		–		3	–	1	–	0
Haskell		–		6	–	2	–	0
Lake Forest		–		10	–	5	–	0
Ohio State		–		5	–	3	–	1
Washington University		–		5	–	3	–	1
Ohio Medical		–		5	–	3	–	1
Iowa State Normal		–		5	–	3	–	2
South Dakota Agricultural		–		3	–	2	–	0
Beloit		–		5	–	3	–	3
Washburn		–		3	–	2	–	3
Carthage		–		1	–	1	–	0
Drake		–		4	–	4	–	0
Detroit College		–		3	–	3	–	0
Mount Union		–		5	–	5	–	1
Wittenberg		–		4	–	4	–	0
Kansas State		–		3	–	4	–	1
Iowa State		–		2	–	6	–	2
Kansas		–		3	–	5	–	2
Wabash		–		4	–	7	–	0
Fairmount		–		3	–	6	–	0
Heidelberg		–		1	–	3	–	1
Miami (OH)		–		1	–	3	–	1
Cincinnati		–		1	–	4	–	1
Case		–		2	–	7	–	0
Missouri		–		1	–	6	–	1
Butler		–		0	–	1	–	0
Chicago Eclectic Medical		–		0	–	3	–	0

The 1901 Washington University football team represented Washington University in St. Louis as an independent during the 1901 college football season. Led by Maurice Gordon Clarke in his first and only season as head coach, Washington University compiled a record of 5–3–1. The team played home games at Athletic Park in St. Louis.

== Schedule ==
Date	Time	Opponent	Site	Result	Attendance	Source
October 5	2:30 p.m.	DePauw	Athletic Park; St. Louis, MO	L 5–24		
October 12		at Illinois	Illinois Field; Champaign, IL	L 0–21		
October 19	3:00 p.m.	Kansas City Medics	Athletic Park; St. Louis, MO	L 0–28		
October 26	3:00 p.m.	Lake Forest	Athletic Park; St. Louis, MO	W 11–0		
November 2	3:00 p.m.	Vanderbilt	Athletic Park; St. Louis, MO	W 12–11	400–2,000	
November 9	3:00 p.m.	Central (MO)	Athletic Park; St. Louis, MO	W 16–11		
November 16	3:00 p.m.	Rose Polytechnic	Athletic Park; St. Louis, MO	W 2–0	200	
November 23		at Missouri Mines	Athletic Park; Rolla, MO	W 16–6		
November 28	3:00 p.m.	University of Indianapolis	Athletic Park; St. Louis, MO	T 6–6	1,500	
