= 1901 Lake Forest Foresters football team =

American college football season

1901 Lake Forest Foresters football
- Conference: Independent
- Record: 10–5
- Captains: Parshall (fullback, halfback); McCarter (halfback, end, quarterback)

1901 Midwestern college football independents records
	Conf.			Overall
Team	W	L	T	W		L		T
Saint Louis		–		10	–	0	–	0
North Dakota Agricultural		–		7	–	0	–	0
Marquette		–		4	–	0	–	1
Northern Illinois State		–		6	–	1	–	0
Notre Dame		–		8	–	1	–	1
Ohio Wesleyan		–		8	–	2	–	0
Kirksville Osteopaths		–		10	–	3	–	0
Nebraska		–		6	–	2	–	0
Ohio		–		6	–	1	–	2
Doane		–		3	–	1	–	0
Haskell		–		6	–	2	–	0
Lake Forest		–		10	–	5	–	0
Ohio State		–		5	–	3	–	1
Washington University		–		5	–	3	–	1
Ohio Medical		–		5	–	3	–	1
Iowa State Normal		–		5	–	3	–	2
South Dakota Agricultural		–		3	–	2	–	0
Beloit		–		5	–	3	–	3
Washburn		–		3	–	2	–	3
Carthage		–		1	–	1	–	0
Drake		–		4	–	4	–	0
Detroit College		–		3	–	3	–	0
Mount Union		–		5	–	5	–	1
Wittenberg		–		4	–	4	–	0
Kansas State		–		3	–	4	–	1
Iowa State		–		2	–	6	–	2
Kansas		–		3	–	5	–	2
Wabash		–		4	–	7	–	0
Fairmount		–		3	–	6	–	0
Heidelberg		–		1	–	3	–	1
Miami (OH)		–		1	–	3	–	1
Cincinnati		–		1	–	4	–	1
Case		–		2	–	7	–	0
Missouri		–		1	–	6	–	1
Butler		–		0	–	1	–	0
Chicago Eclectic Medical		–		0	–	3	–	0

The 1901 Lake Forest Foresters football team was an American football team that represented Lake Forest University in the 1901 college football season. In one of the longest seasons of any college football team in history, Lake Forest compiled a 10–5 record, achieving their first and only ten win season, and outscored their opponents 160 to 89. Notable games included a 0–16 loss to Notre Dame, who were proclaimed champions of Indiana, and a 0–12 loss to an 8–2–1 Northwestern team.

== Schedule ==
Date	Time	Opponent	Site	Result	Attendance	Source
September 28		at Hinsdale High School	Hinsdale, IL	L 0–22		
October 2		Waukegan High School	Lake Forest, IL	W 21–0		
October 5		at Northwestern	Sheppard Field; Evanston, IL	L 0–12		
October 9		Waukegan High School	Lake Forest, IL	W 11–0		
October 12		Fort Sheridan Artillery	Lake Forest, IL	W 6–5		
October 19		Bennett Medical	Lake Forest, IL	W 59–0		
October 26	3:00 p.m.	at Washington University	Athletic Park; Saint Louis, MO	L 0–11		
October 28		at Illinois College	Jacksonville, IL	W 12–6		
November 2		at Notre Dame	Cartier Field; Notre Dame, IN	L 0–16		
November 8		Chicago Dental	Lake Forest, IL	W 6–0	200+	
November 16		Lewis Institute	Lake Forest, IL	W 12–0		
November 20		at Northwestern Military Academy	Highland Park, IL	W 22–0		
November 23		Lake Forest Academy	Lake Forest Academy Field; Lake Forest, IL	W 6–0		
November 23		Lake Forest Alumni	Lake Forest, IL	W 5–0		
November 28		at Knox	Galesburg, Il	L 0–17		
