= 1901 Ohio State Buckeyes football team =

American college football season

1901 Ohio State Buckeyes football
- Conference: Independent
- Record: 5–3–1
- Head coach: John B. Eckstorm (3rd season)
- Captain: J. M. Kittle
- Home stadium: Ohio Field

1901 Midwestern college football independents records
	Conf.			Overall
Team	W	L	T	W		L		T
Saint Louis		–		10	–	0	–	0
North Dakota Agricultural		–		7	–	0	–	0
Marquette		–		4	–	0	–	1
Northern Illinois State		–		6	–	1	–	0
Notre Dame		–		8	–	1	–	1
Ohio Wesleyan		–		8	–	2	–	0
Kirksville Osteopaths		–		10	–	3	–	0
Nebraska		–		6	–	2	–	0
Ohio		–		6	–	1	–	2
Doane		–		3	–	1	–	0
Haskell		–		6	–	2	–	0
Lake Forest		–		10	–	5	–	0
Ohio State		–		5	–	3	–	1
Washington University		–		5	–	3	–	1
Ohio Medical		–		5	–	3	–	1
Iowa State Normal		–		5	–	3	–	2
South Dakota Agricultural		–		3	–	2	–	0
Beloit		–		5	–	3	–	3
Washburn		–		3	–	2	–	3
Carthage		–		1	–	1	–	0
Drake		–		4	–	4	–	0
Detroit College		–		3	–	3	–	0
Mount Union		–		5	–	5	–	1
Wittenberg		–		4	–	4	–	0
Kansas State		–		3	–	4	–	1
Iowa State		–		2	–	6	–	2
Kansas		–		3	–	5	–	2
Wabash		–		4	–	7	–	0
Fairmount		–		3	–	6	–	0
Heidelberg		–		1	–	3	–	1
Miami (OH)		–		1	–	3	–	1
Cincinnati		–		1	–	4	–	1
Case		–		2	–	7	–	0
Missouri		–		1	–	6	–	1
Butler		–		0	–	1	–	0
Chicago Eclectic Medical		–		0	–	3	–	0

The 1901 Ohio State Buckeyes football team was an American football team that represented Ohio State University as an independent during the 1901 college football season. In its third and final season under head coach John B. Eckstorm, the team compiled a 5–3–1 record and outscored opponents by a total of 94 to 56. J. M. Kittle was the team captain.

During the 1901 season, support for the Ohio State football team grew, and for the first time, the program generated a profit for the university athletic association.

On October 26, 1901, John Sigrist, who played center-rush, sustained a broken vertebrae in a game against Western Reserve. He died from his injuries two days later. He remains the only Ohio State player to have died from injuries sustained in a game.

== Schedule ==
Date	Opponent	Site	Result	Attendance	Source
September 28	Otterbein	Ohio Field; Columbus, OH	T 0–0		
October 5	Wittenberg	Ohio Field; Columbus, OH	W 30–0		
October 12	Ohio	Ohio Field; Columbus, OH	W 17–0		
October 19	Marietta	Ohio Field; Columbus, OH	W 24–0		
October 26	Western Reserve	Ohio Field; Columbus, OH	W 6–5		
November 9	Michigan	Ohio Field; Columbus, OH (rivalry)	L 0–21	4,000	
November 16	at Oberlin	Oberlin, OH	L 0–6		
November 23	Indiana	Ohio Field; Columbus, OH	L 6–18		
November 28	Kenyon	Ohio Field; Columbus, OH	W 11–6	3,500	

== Game summaries ==
=== Week 6: Michigan ===
Michigan at Ohio State

Team	1	2	Total
• Michigan	16	5	21
Ohio State	0	0	0

- Date: November 9, 1901
- Location: Ohio Field, Columbus, OH
- Game attendance: 4,000
- Referee: Wrenn

On November 9, 1901, undefeated Ohio State, having allowed opponents to score only five points in five prior games, faced an undefeated Michigan team coached by Fielding H. Yost that had not allowed opponents to score in six previous games. The 1901 game was the third meeting in what would become the Michigan–Ohio State football rivalry, with the two teams having played to a scoreless tie in their previous match in 1900.

The Buckeyes lost the 1901 game to the Wolverines by a 21–0 score in front of 4,000 spectators at Ohio Field. Prior to the game, the head coaches argued over the length of the game, Yost of Michigan insisting on regulation halves of 30 minute and Ohio State's Eckstorm insisting that the first half be limited to 25 minutes. When the umpire threatened Ohio State with a forfeiture, coach Eckstrom agreed to play regulation halves of 30 minutes.

The Detroit Free Press noted that Ohio State's players sought to slow the pace of the game. The paper noted: "On almost every scrimmage some Ohio man would stretch out on the ground and take his full time. This playing for wind was so apparent that the Michigan players finally burlesqued it. The Ohio men could not stand the gaff, and their doctors and trainer ran more yards than both teams put together." After the game, coach Yost commented on Ohio State's tactic: "Their laying down for time took much of the vim out of our team, and rested their tired out players."

Ohio Governor George K. Nash attended the game and said afterward: "Football is a great game for young men who are physically fit for such a contest, and I enjoyed the game immensely, although I regretted to see our state team lose, but Michigan is entitled to the victory, and I think she was aware she had a game on her hands."
