= 1901 Ohio Medical football team =

American college football season

1901 Ohio Medical football
- Conference: Independent
- Record: 5–3–1
- Home stadium: Neil Park

1901 Midwestern college football independents records
	Conf.			Overall
Team	W	L	T	W		L		T
Saint Louis		–		10	–	0	–	0
North Dakota Agricultural		–		7	–	0	–	0
Marquette		–		4	–	0	–	1
Northern Illinois State		–		6	–	1	–	0
Notre Dame		–		8	–	1	–	1
Ohio Wesleyan		–		8	–	2	–	0
Kirksville Osteopaths		–		10	–	3	–	0
Nebraska		–		6	–	2	–	0
Ohio		–		6	–	1	–	2
Doane		–		3	–	1	–	0
Haskell		–		6	–	2	–	0
Lake Forest		–		10	–	5	–	0
Ohio State		–		5	–	3	–	1
Washington University		–		5	–	3	–	1
Ohio Medical		–		5	–	3	–	1
Iowa State Normal		–		5	–	3	–	2
South Dakota Agricultural		–		3	–	2	–	0
Beloit		–		5	–	3	–	3
Washburn		–		3	–	2	–	3
Carthage		–		1	–	1	–	0
Drake		–		4	–	4	–	0
Detroit College		–		3	–	3	–	0
Mount Union		–		5	–	5	–	1
Wittenberg		–		4	–	4	–	0
Kansas State		–		3	–	4	–	1
Iowa State		–		2	–	6	–	2
Kansas		–		3	–	5	–	2
Wabash		–		4	–	7	–	0
Fairmount		–		3	–	6	–	0
Heidelberg		–		1	–	3	–	1
Miami (OH)		–		1	–	3	–	1
Cincinnati		–		1	–	4	–	1
Case		–		2	–	7	–	0
Missouri		–		1	–	6	–	1
Butler		–		0	–	1	–	0
Chicago Eclectic Medical		–		0	–	3	–	0

The 1901 Ohio Medical football team was an American football team that represented the Ohio Medical University in the 1901 college football season. Ohio Medical compiled a 5–3–1 record, and outscored their opponents 85 to 57.

== Schedule ==
Date	Opponent	Site	Result	Source
October 5	Notre Dame	Neil Park; Columbus, OH	L 0–6	
October 12	Otterbein	Columbus, OH	W 17–0	
October 19	Homestead Athletic Club	Exposition Park; Allegheny City, PA	L 0–28	
November 2	Washington & Jefferson	Columbus, OH	T 0–0	
November 9	Marietta	Marietta, OH	W 6–5	
November 16	Case		W 24–0	
November 23	Ohio Wesleyan	Delaware, OH	L 16–18	
November 28	Portsmouth Cycling Club	Portsmouth, OH	W 16–0	
	Denison		W 6–0	
