= 1901 Nebraska Cornhuskers football team =

American college football season

1901 Nebraska Cornhuskers football
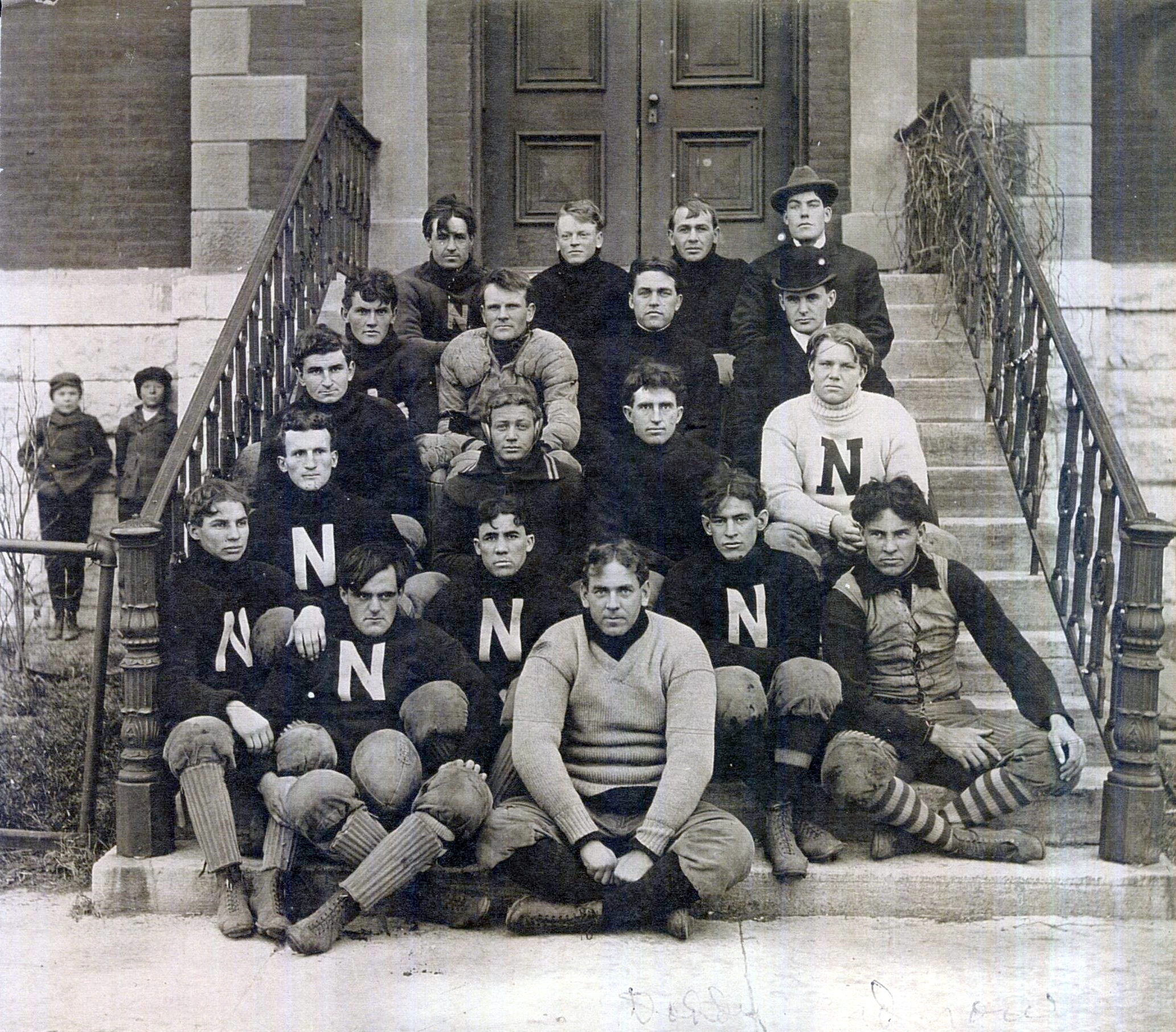

Missouri Valley champion
- Conference: Independent
- Record: 6–2
- Head coach: Walter C. Booth (2nd season)
- Home stadium: Antelope Field

1901 Midwestern college football independents records
	Conf.			Overall
Team	W	L	T	W		L		T
Saint Louis		–		10	–	0	–	0
North Dakota Agricultural		–		7	–	0	–	0
Marquette		–		4	–	0	–	1
Northern Illinois State		–		6	–	1	–	0
Notre Dame		–		8	–	1	–	1
Ohio Wesleyan		–		8	–	2	–	0
Kirksville Osteopaths		–		10	–	3	–	0
Nebraska		–		6	–	2	–	0
Ohio		–		6	–	1	–	2
Doane		–		3	–	1	–	0
Haskell		–		6	–	2	–	0
Lake Forest		–		10	–	5	–	0
Ohio State		–		5	–	3	–	1
Washington University		–		5	–	3	–	1
Ohio Medical		–		5	–	3	–	1
Iowa State Normal		–		5	–	3	–	2
South Dakota Agricultural		–		3	–	2	–	0
Beloit		–		5	–	3	–	3
Washburn		–		3	–	2	–	3
Carthage		–		1	–	1	–	0
Drake		–		4	–	4	–	0
Detroit College		–		3	–	3	–	0
Mount Union		–		5	–	5	–	1
Wittenberg		–		4	–	4	–	0
Kansas State		–		3	–	4	–	1
Iowa State		–		2	–	6	–	2
Kansas		–		3	–	5	–	2
Wabash		–		4	–	7	–	0
Fairmount		–		3	–	6	–	0
Heidelberg		–		1	–	3	–	1
Miami (OH)		–		1	–	3	–	1
Cincinnati		–		1	–	4	–	1
Case		–		2	–	7	–	0
Missouri		–		1	–	6	–	1
Butler		–		0	–	1	–	0
Chicago Eclectic Medical		–		0	–	3	–	0

The 1901 Nebraska Cornhuskers football team represented the University of Nebraska as an independent during the 1901 college football season. Led by second-year head coach Walter C. Booth, the Cornhuskers compiled a record of 6–2, excluding one exhibition game. Nebraska played home games at Antelope Field in Lincoln, Nebraska.

With victories over Iowa State, Missouri, Kansas, and Haskell, Nebraska was recognized as Missouri Valley champion.

== Schedule ==
Date	Time	Opponent	Site	Result	Attendance	Source
September 21		Lincoln High School	Antelope Field; Lincoln, NE	W 22–0 (exhibition)		
September 28		at Kirksville Osteopaths	Kirksville, MO	W 5–0	1,000	
October 5		Doane	Antelope Field; Lincoln, NE	W 29–0		
October 12		at Minnesota	Northrop Field; Minneapolis, MN (rivalry)	L 0–19	2,500+	
October 26		Iowa State	Antelope Field; Lincoln, NE (rivalry)	W 17–0		
November 2		vs. Wisconsin	Milwaukee, WI	L 0–18		
November 9	3:00 p.m.	vs. Missouri	YMCA Park; Omaha, NE (rivalry)	W 51–0		
November 16		Kansas	Antelope Field; Lincoln, NE (rivalry)	W 29–5	4,000	
November 28		Haskell	Antelope Field; Lincoln, NE	W 18–10	> 4,000	

== Coaching staff ==
Coach	Position	First year	Alma mater
Walter C. Booth	Head coach	1900	Princeton
Jack Best	Trainer	1890	Nebraska
Guy Cowgill	Manager	1901	
I. C. Raymond	Assistant manager	1901	

== Roster ==
Bell, Johnny HB
Bender, Johnny HB
Brew, Fred RG
Cortelyou, Spencer E
Crandall, Harry HB
Cuff, E.W. HB
Drain, Ralph QB
Eager, Earl HB
Johnson, William E
Kingsbury, Raymond FB
Koehler, John C
Maloney, J.R. LG
Pillsbury, Melville FB
Ringer, John LG
Shedd, Charlie E
Shedd, George FB
Stringer, Lewis T
Tobin, John G
Voss T
Westover, John RT

== Game summaries ==
=== Lincoln High ===
Lincoln High at Nebraska

Team	1	2	Total
Lincoln High			0
• Nebraska			22

- Date: September 21
- Location: Antelope Field, Lincoln, NE

=== At Kirksville Osteopaths ===
Kirksville at Nebraska

Team	1	2	Total
• Nebraska			5
Kirksville			0

- Date: September 28
- Location: Kirksville, MO

Nebraska managed only one touchdown against the medical students from Kirksville, holding on to win 5–0. This was the only meeting between Kirksville and Nebraska.

=== Doane ===
Doane at Nebraska

Team	1	2	Total
Doane			0
• Nebraska			29

- Date: October 5
- Location: Antelope Field, Lincoln, NE

After a four-year break, Doane and Nebraska resumed their series in Lincoln. Nebraska dominated the game, its third straight shutout victory.

=== At Minnesota ===
Nebraska at Minnesota

Team	1	2	Total
Nebraska			0
• Minnesota			19

- Date: October 12
- Location: Northrop Field, Minneapolis, MN
- Game attendance: 2500+

For the second consecutive year, Minnesota ended Nebraska's unbeaten season, this time in a dominating 19–0 victory.

=== Iowa State ===
Iowa State at Nebraska

Team	1	2	Total
Iowa State			0
• Nebraska			17

- Date: October 26
- Location: Antelope Field, Lincoln, NE

Nebraska, shorthanded due to injuries suffered against Minnesota, shut out Iowa State for the second straight year, allowing only 75 yards and three first downs to the Cyclones.

=== Wisconsin ===
Nebraska at Wisconsin

Team	1	2	Total
Nebraska			0
• Wisconsin			18

- Date: November 2
- Location: Milwaukee, WI

Nebraska and Wisconsin met for the first time in Milwaukee, an 18–0 Badgers victory. Over 100 years later, the teams would become division rivals when Nebraska joined the Big Ten in 2011.

=== Missouri ===
Missouri vs. Nebraska

Team	1	2	Total
Missouri			0
• Nebraska			51

- Date: November 9
- Location: YMCA Park, Omaha, NE

Nebraska hammered Missouri 51–0 in Omaha, the second-largest victory in program history.

=== Kansas ===
Kansas at Nebraska

Team	1	2	Total
Kansas			5
• Nebraska			29

- Date: November 16
- Location: Antelope Field, Lincoln, NE

An early Nebraska fumble put Kansas on the scoreboard, but Nebraska dominated the rest of the game to even the all-time series at five.

=== Haskell ===
Haskell at Nebraska

Team	1	2	Total
Haskell	10	0	10
• Nebraska	0	18	18

- Date: November 28
- Location: Antelope Field, Lincoln, NE

Haskell and Nebraska met for the first time to close the 1901 season. Haskell, despite using a team of high school players (the school would not add a college until the following year), led 10–0 at halftime. Nebraska, however, scored the game's final 18 points to win the game and end the season 6–2.
