= 1901 Drake Bulldogs football team =

American college football season

1901 Drake Bulldogs football
- Conference: Independent
- Record: 4–4
- Head coach: Charles Best (2nd season)
- Home stadium: South Ninth Street grounds

1901 Midwestern college football independents records
	Conf.			Overall
Team	W	L	T	W		L		T
Saint Louis		–		10	–	0	–	0
North Dakota Agricultural		–		7	–	0	–	0
Marquette		–		4	–	0	–	1
Northern Illinois State		–		6	–	1	–	0
Notre Dame		–		8	–	1	–	1
Ohio Wesleyan		–		8	–	2	–	0
Kirksville Osteopaths		–		10	–	3	–	0
Nebraska		–		6	–	2	–	0
Ohio		–		6	–	1	–	2
Doane		–		3	–	1	–	0
Haskell		–		6	–	2	–	0
Lake Forest		–		10	–	5	–	0
Ohio State		–		5	–	3	–	1
Washington University		–		5	–	3	–	1
Ohio Medical		–		5	–	3	–	1
Iowa State Normal		–		5	–	3	–	2
South Dakota Agricultural		–		3	–	2	–	0
Beloit		–		5	–	3	–	3
Washburn		–		3	–	2	–	3
Carthage		–		1	–	1	–	0
Drake		–		4	–	4	–	0
Detroit College		–		3	–	3	–	0
Mount Union		–		5	–	5	–	1
Wittenberg		–		4	–	4	–	0
Kansas State		–		3	–	4	–	1
Iowa State		–		2	–	6	–	2
Kansas		–		3	–	5	–	2
Wabash		–		4	–	7	–	0
Fairmount		–		3	–	6	–	0
Heidelberg		–		1	–	3	–	1
Miami (OH)		–		1	–	3	–	1
Cincinnati		–		1	–	4	–	1
Case		–		2	–	7	–	0
Missouri		–		1	–	6	–	1
Butler		–		0	–	1	–	0
Chicago Eclectic Medical		–		0	–	3	–	0

The 1901 Drake Bulldogs football team was an American football team that represented Drake University during the 1901 college football season. In its second season under head coach Charles Best, the team compiled a 4–4 record and outscored opponents by a total of 113 to 34.

== Schedule ==
Date	Time	Opponent	Site	Result	Attendance	Source
September 28		Des Moines	Des Moines, IA	W 29–0		
October 5		Grinnell	Des Moines, IA	L 5–6		
October 11		Iowa	South Ninth Street grounds; Des Moines, IA	L 5–6	2,000	
October 19		Iowa State Normal	Des Moines, IA (rivalry)	W 33–2		
October 26		at Missouri	Columbia, MO	W 24–0		
November 1		Simpson	Des Moines, IA	L 5–10		
November 16	2:30 p.m.	at Iowa State	State Field; Ames, IA	W 12–5		
November 28		Grinnell	Des Moines, IA	L 0–5		
All times are in Central time
