= 1901 Kansas State Aggies football team =

American college football season

1901 Kansas State Aggies football
- Conference: Independent
- Record: 3–4–1
- Head coach: Wade Moore (1st season)
- Home stadium: Athletic Park

1901 Midwestern college football independents records
| | Conf. | | | Overall |
| Team | W | L | T | W | | L | | T |
|---|---|---|---|---|---|---|---|---|
| Saint Louis | | – | | 10 | – | 0 | – | 0 |
| North Dakota Agricultural | | – | | 7 | – | 0 | – | 0 |
| Marquette | | – | | 4 | – | 0 | – | 1 |
| Northern Illinois State | | – | | 6 | – | 1 | – | 0 |
| Notre Dame | | – | | 8 | – | 1 | – | 1 |
| Ohio Wesleyan | | – | | 8 | – | 2 | – | 0 |
| Kirksville Osteopaths | | – | | 10 | – | 3 | – | 0 |
| Nebraska | | – | | 6 | – | 2 | – | 0 |
| Ohio | | – | | 6 | – | 1 | – | 2 |
| Doane | | – | | 3 | – | 1 | – | 0 |
| Haskell | | – | | 6 | – | 2 | – | 0 |
| Lake Forest | | – | | 10 | – | 5 | – | 0 |
| Ohio State | | – | | 5 | – | 3 | – | 1 |
| Washington University | | – | | 5 | – | 3 | – | 1 |
| Ohio Medical | | – | | 5 | – | 3 | – | 1 |
| Iowa State Normal | | – | | 5 | – | 3 | – | 2 |
| South Dakota Agricultural | | – | | 3 | – | 2 | – | 0 |
| Beloit | | – | | 5 | – | 3 | – | 3 |
| Washburn | | – | | 3 | – | 2 | – | 3 |
| Carthage | | – | | 1 | – | 1 | – | 0 |
| Drake | | – | | 4 | – | 4 | – | 0 |
| Detroit College | | – | | 3 | – | 3 | – | 0 |
| Mount Union | | – | | 5 | – | 5 | – | 1 |
| Wittenberg | | – | | 4 | – | 4 | – | 0 |
| Kansas State | | – | | 3 | – | 4 | – | 1 |
| Iowa State | | – | | 2 | – | 6 | – | 2 |
| Kansas | | – | | 3 | – | 5 | – | 2 |
| Wabash | | – | | 4 | – | 7 | – | 0 |
| Fairmount | | – | | 3 | – | 6 | – | 0 |
| Heidelberg | | – | | 1 | – | 3 | – | 1 |
| Miami (OH) | | – | | 1 | – | 3 | – | 1 |
| Cincinnati | | – | | 1 | – | 4 | – | 1 |
| Case | | – | | 2 | – | 7 | – | 0 |
| Missouri | | – | | 1 | – | 6 | – | 1 |
| Butler | | – | | 0 | – | 1 | – | 0 |
| Chicago Eclectic Medical | | – | | 0 | – | 3 | – | 0 |

The 1901 Kansas State Aggies football team was an American football team that represented Kansas State Agricultural College—now known as Kansas State University—as an independent during the 1901 college football season. In their first season under head coach Wade Moore, the Aggies compiled a 3–4–1 record. The team played home games at Athletic Park in Manhattan, Kansas.

== Schedule ==
| Date | Opponent | Site | Result | Attendance | Source |
|---|---|---|---|---|---|
| October 7 | at Bethany (KS) | Lindsborg, KS | W 12–5 | | |
| October 14 | College of Emporia | Manhattan, KS | W 11–0 | | |
| October 21 | Bethany (KS) | Athletic Park; Manhattan, KS | L 0–17 | 1,200 | |
| November 6 | Kansas City Medics | Athletic Park; Manhattan, KS | L 6–24 | | |
| November 9 | at Kansas State Normal | Emporia, KS | L 0–6 | | |
| November 11 | at College of Emporia | Emporia, KS | L 0–11 | | |
| November 20 | Manhattan High School | Manhattan, KS | W 30–0 | | |
| December 2 | at Washington | Washington, KS | T 6–6 | | |
