= 1901 Beloit football team =

American college football season

1901 Beloit football
- Conference: Independent
- Record: 5–3–3
- Head coach: John W. Hollister (6th season)
- Home stadium: Keep Athletic Field

1901 Midwestern college football independents records
	Conf.			Overall
Team	W	L	T	W		L		T
Saint Louis		–		10	–	0	–	0
North Dakota Agricultural		–		7	–	0	–	0
Marquette		–		4	–	0	–	1
Northern Illinois State		–		6	–	1	–	0
Notre Dame		–		8	–	1	–	1
Ohio Wesleyan		–		8	–	2	–	0
Kirksville Osteopaths		–		10	–	3	–	0
Nebraska		–		6	–	2	–	0
Ohio		–		6	–	1	–	2
Doane		–		3	–	1	–	0
Haskell		–		6	–	2	–	0
Lake Forest		–		10	–	5	–	0
Ohio State		–		5	–	3	–	1
Washington University		–		5	–	3	–	1
Ohio Medical		–		5	–	3	–	1
Iowa State Normal		–		5	–	3	–	2
South Dakota Agricultural		–		3	–	2	–	0
Beloit		–		5	–	3	–	3
Washburn		–		3	–	2	–	3
Carthage		–		1	–	1	–	0
Drake		–		4	–	4	–	0
Detroit College		–		3	–	3	–	0
Mount Union		–		5	–	5	–	1
Wittenberg		–		4	–	4	–	0
Kansas State		–		3	–	4	–	1
Iowa State		–		2	–	6	–	2
Kansas		–		3	–	5	–	2
Wabash		–		4	–	7	–	0
Fairmount		–		3	–	6	–	0
Heidelberg		–		1	–	3	–	1
Miami (OH)		–		1	–	3	–	1
Cincinnati		–		1	–	4	–	1
Case		–		2	–	7	–	0
Missouri		–		1	–	6	–	1
Butler		–		0	–	1	–	0
Chicago Eclectic Medical		–		0	–	3	–	0

The 1901 Beloit football team represented Beloit College as an independent during the 1901 college football season. In its sixth season under head coach John W. Hollister, the team compiled a 5–3–3 record.

Under coach Hollister, Beloit was considered one of the major football teams in the Midwest, scheduling games against the region's premiere programs. The 1901 team played tie games with Kansas, Chicago (coached by Amos Alonzo Stagg), and Northwestern and lost by only five points to Notre Dame. In one of the worst defeats in program history, Beloit lost to national champion Michigan by an 89–0 score.

The team played its home games at Keep Athletic Field in Beloit, Wisconsin.

== Schedule ==
Date	Opponent	Site	Result	Source
September 21	Sacred Heart Academy (WI)	Keep Athletic Field; Beloit, WI	W 17–0	
September 28	Rockford YMCA	Keep Athletic Field; Beloit, WI	W 34–0	
October 5	Cornell (IA)	Keep Athletic Field; Beloit, WI	W 11–0	
October 12	vs. Wisconsin	Milwaukee Baseball Park; Milwaukee, WI	L 0–40	
October 19	Elgin Academy	Keep Athletic Field; Beloit, WI	W 59–0	
October 26	Notre Dame	Keep Athletic Field; Beloit, WI	L 0–5	
October 29	Kansas	Keep Athletic Field; Beloit, WI	T 0–0	
November 2	at Chicago	Marshall Field; Chicago, IL	T 17–17	
November 16	at Northwestern	Sheppard Field; Evanston, IL	T 11–11	
November 23	Michigan	Regents Field; Ann Arbor, MI	L 0–89	
November 28	at Milwaukee Medical	Milwaukee, WI	W 11–0	
