= 1901 Missouri Tigers football team =

American college football season

1901 Missouri Tigers football
- Conference: Independent
- Record: 1–6–1
- Head coach: Fred W. Murphy (1st season)
- Captain: Charles Washer
- Home stadium: Rollins Field

1901 Midwestern college football independents records
| | Conf. | | | Overall |
| Team | W | L | T | W | | L | | T |
|---|---|---|---|---|---|---|---|---|
| Saint Louis | | – | | 10 | – | 0 | – | 0 |
| North Dakota Agricultural | | – | | 7 | – | 0 | – | 0 |
| Marquette | | – | | 4 | – | 0 | – | 1 |
| Northern Illinois State | | – | | 6 | – | 1 | – | 0 |
| Notre Dame | | – | | 8 | – | 1 | – | 1 |
| Ohio Wesleyan | | – | | 8 | – | 2 | – | 0 |
| Kirksville Osteopaths | | – | | 10 | – | 3 | – | 0 |
| Nebraska | | – | | 6 | – | 2 | – | 0 |
| Ohio | | – | | 6 | – | 1 | – | 2 |
| Doane | | – | | 3 | – | 1 | – | 0 |
| Haskell | | – | | 6 | – | 2 | – | 0 |
| Lake Forest | | – | | 10 | – | 5 | – | 0 |
| Ohio State | | – | | 5 | – | 3 | – | 1 |
| Washington University | | – | | 5 | – | 3 | – | 1 |
| Ohio Medical | | – | | 5 | – | 3 | – | 1 |
| Iowa State Normal | | – | | 5 | – | 3 | – | 2 |
| South Dakota Agricultural | | – | | 3 | – | 2 | – | 0 |
| Beloit | | – | | 5 | – | 3 | – | 3 |
| Washburn | | – | | 3 | – | 2 | – | 3 |
| Carthage | | – | | 1 | – | 1 | – | 0 |
| Drake | | – | | 4 | – | 4 | – | 0 |
| Detroit College | | – | | 3 | – | 3 | – | 0 |
| Mount Union | | – | | 5 | – | 5 | – | 1 |
| Wittenberg | | – | | 4 | – | 4 | – | 0 |
| Kansas State | | – | | 3 | – | 4 | – | 1 |
| Iowa State | | – | | 2 | – | 6 | – | 2 |
| Kansas | | – | | 3 | – | 5 | – | 2 |
| Wabash | | – | | 4 | – | 7 | – | 0 |
| Fairmount | | – | | 3 | – | 6 | – | 0 |
| Heidelberg | | – | | 1 | – | 3 | – | 1 |
| Miami (OH) | | – | | 1 | – | 3 | – | 1 |
| Cincinnati | | – | | 1 | – | 4 | – | 1 |
| Case | | – | | 2 | – | 7 | – | 0 |
| Missouri | | – | | 1 | – | 6 | – | 1 |
| Butler | | – | | 0 | – | 1 | – | 0 |
| Chicago Eclectic Medical | | – | | 0 | – | 3 | – | 0 |

The 1901 Missouri Tigers football team was an American football team that represented the University of Missouri as an independent during the 1901 college football season. The team compiled a 1-6-1 record and was outscored by its opponents by a combined total of 155 to 30. Fred W. Murphy was the head coach for the second and final season. The team played its home games at Rollins Field in Columbia, Missouri.

== Schedule ==
| Date | Opponent | Site | Result | Attendance | Source |
|---|---|---|---|---|---|
| October 5 | Kirksville Osteopaths | Rollins Field; Columbia, MO | L 5–22 | 3,000 | |
| October 11 | Simpson | Rollins Field; Columbia, MO | L 0–10 | | |
| October 22 | Warrensburg Teachers | Cottage Place Park; Jefferson City, MO | L 0–1 (forfeit) | | |
| October 26 | at Drake | South Ninth Street Grounds; Des Moines, IA | L 0–24 | | |
| November 2 | Ottawa | Rollins Field; Columbia, MO | T 6–6 | | |
| November 9 | vs. Nebraska | YMCA Park; Omaha, NE (rivalry) | L 0–51 | | |
| November 16 | Texas | Rollins Field; Columbia, MO | L 0–11 | | |
| November 18 | Haskell | Rollins Field; Columbia, MO | L 0–19 | | |
| November 28 | vs. Kansas | Exposition Park; Kansas City, MO (rivalry) | W 18–12 | 7,000 | |
