= 1901 Case football team =

American college football season

1901 Case football
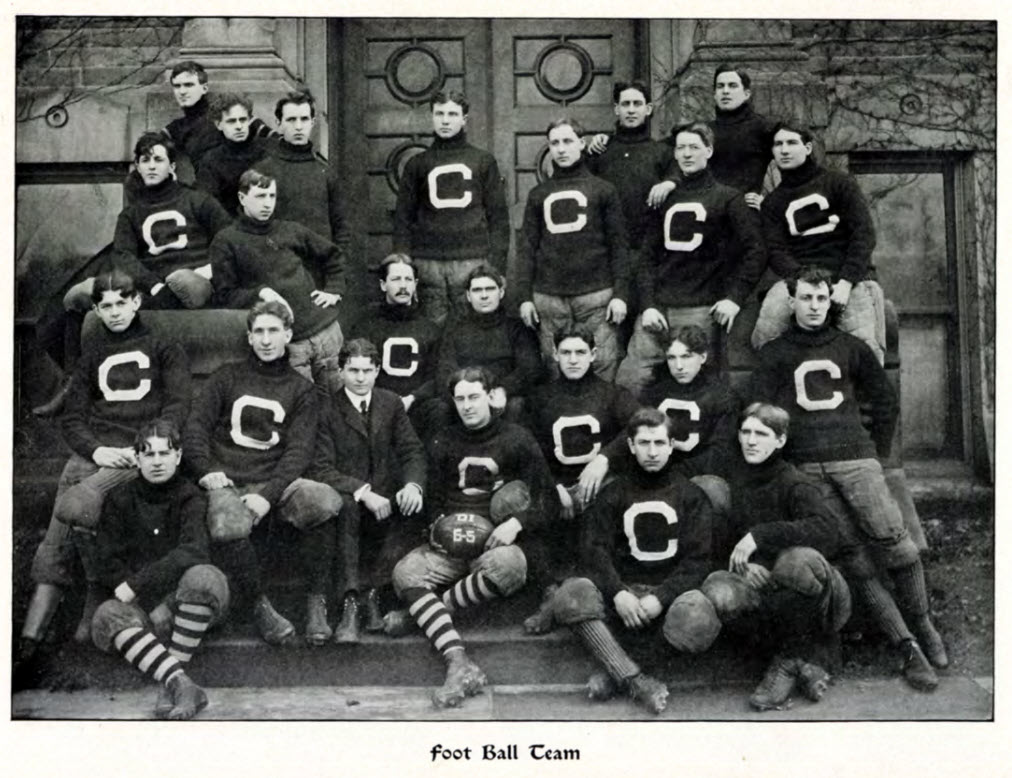
- Conference: Independent
- Record: 2–7
- Head coach: John J. Dillon (1st season)
- Home stadium: Case Field

1901 Midwestern college football independents records
	Conf.			Overall
Team	W	L	T	W		L		T
Saint Louis		–		10	–	0	–	0
North Dakota Agricultural		–		7	–	0	–	0
Marquette		–		4	–	0	–	1
Northern Illinois State		–		6	–	1	–	0
Notre Dame		–		8	–	1	–	1
Ohio Wesleyan		–		8	–	2	–	0
Kirksville Osteopaths		–		10	–	3	–	0
Nebraska		–		6	–	2	–	0
Ohio		–		6	–	1	–	2
Doane		–		3	–	1	–	0
Haskell		–		6	–	2	–	0
Lake Forest		–		10	–	5	–	0
Ohio State		–		5	–	3	–	1
Washington University		–		5	–	3	–	1
Ohio Medical		–		5	–	3	–	1
Iowa State Normal		–		5	–	3	–	2
South Dakota Agricultural		–		3	–	2	–	0
Beloit		–		5	–	3	–	3
Washburn		–		3	–	2	–	3
Carthage		–		1	–	1	–	0
Drake		–		4	–	4	–	0
Detroit College		–		3	–	3	–	0
Mount Union		–		5	–	5	–	1
Wittenberg		–		4	–	4	–	0
Kansas State		–		3	–	4	–	1
Iowa State		–		2	–	6	–	2
Kansas		–		3	–	5	–	2
Wabash		–		4	–	7	–	0
Fairmount		–		3	–	6	–	0
Heidelberg		–		1	–	3	–	1
Miami (OH)		–		1	–	3	–	1
Cincinnati		–		1	–	4	–	1
Case		–		2	–	7	–	0
Missouri		–		1	–	6	–	1
Butler		–		0	–	1	–	0
Chicago Eclectic Medical		–		0	–	3	–	0

The 1901 Case football team was an American football team that represented the Case School of Applied Science in Cleveland, Ohio, now a part of Case Western Reserve University. Playing as an independent during the 1902 college football season, the team compiled a 2–7 record and was outscored by a total of 181 to 38. John J. Dillon, formerly the quarterback for Syracuse, was hired as the team's football coach in April 1901.

== Schedule ==
Date	Opponent	Site	Result	Source
October 5	at Michigan	Regents Field; Ann Arbor, MI	L 0–57	
October 12	at Buffalo	Buffalo Athletic Field; Buffalo, NY	L 0–6	
October 19	Kenyon	Case Field; Cleveland, OH	L 5–6	
October 26	at Washington & Jefferson	Washington Fairgrounds; Washington, PA	L 0–28	
November 2	at Purdue	Stuart Field; West Lafayette, IN	L 0–22	
November 5	Oberlin	Case field; Cleveland, OH	L 0–33	
November 16	at Ohio Medical	Columbus, OH	L 0–24	
November 23	Heidelberg	Case Field; Cleveland, OH	W 27–0	
November 28	Western Reserve	Case Field; Cleveland, OH	W 6–5	
