= 1901 college football season =

American college football season

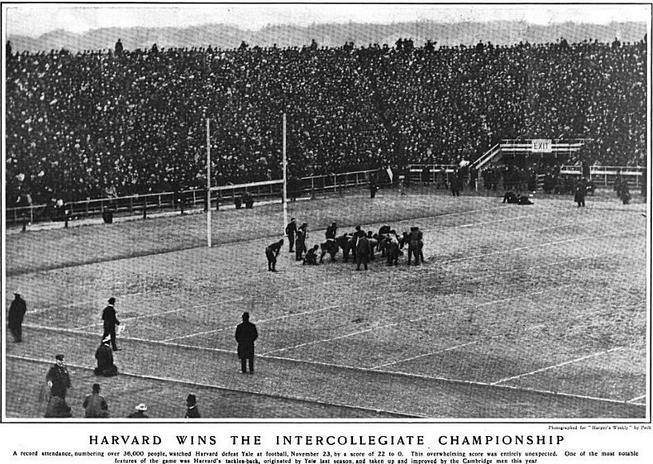
- Harvard–Yale game.
- Number of bowls: 1 (1902 Rose Bowl)
- Champion(s): Harvard; Michigan

The 1901 college football season had no clear-cut champion, with NCAA-designated "major selectors" retroactively selecting Michigan and Harvard as national champions. Until 2026, the NCAA record book erroneously listed Yale as Parke H. Davis's selection. (Note: Parke Davis' selection for 1901, as published in Spalding's Foot Ball Guide (to which he was a contributor until his death) for 1934 and 1935, was Harvard.) (Note: The NCAA Record Book stated "Yale" for 1901 as having been solely selected by Parke Davis, which is an error that has been perpetuated since the first appearance of Parke Davis' selections in the NCAA book about 1995. The book was amended in 2026.) Harvard beat Yale 22–0 the last game of the year.

== Conference and program changes ==
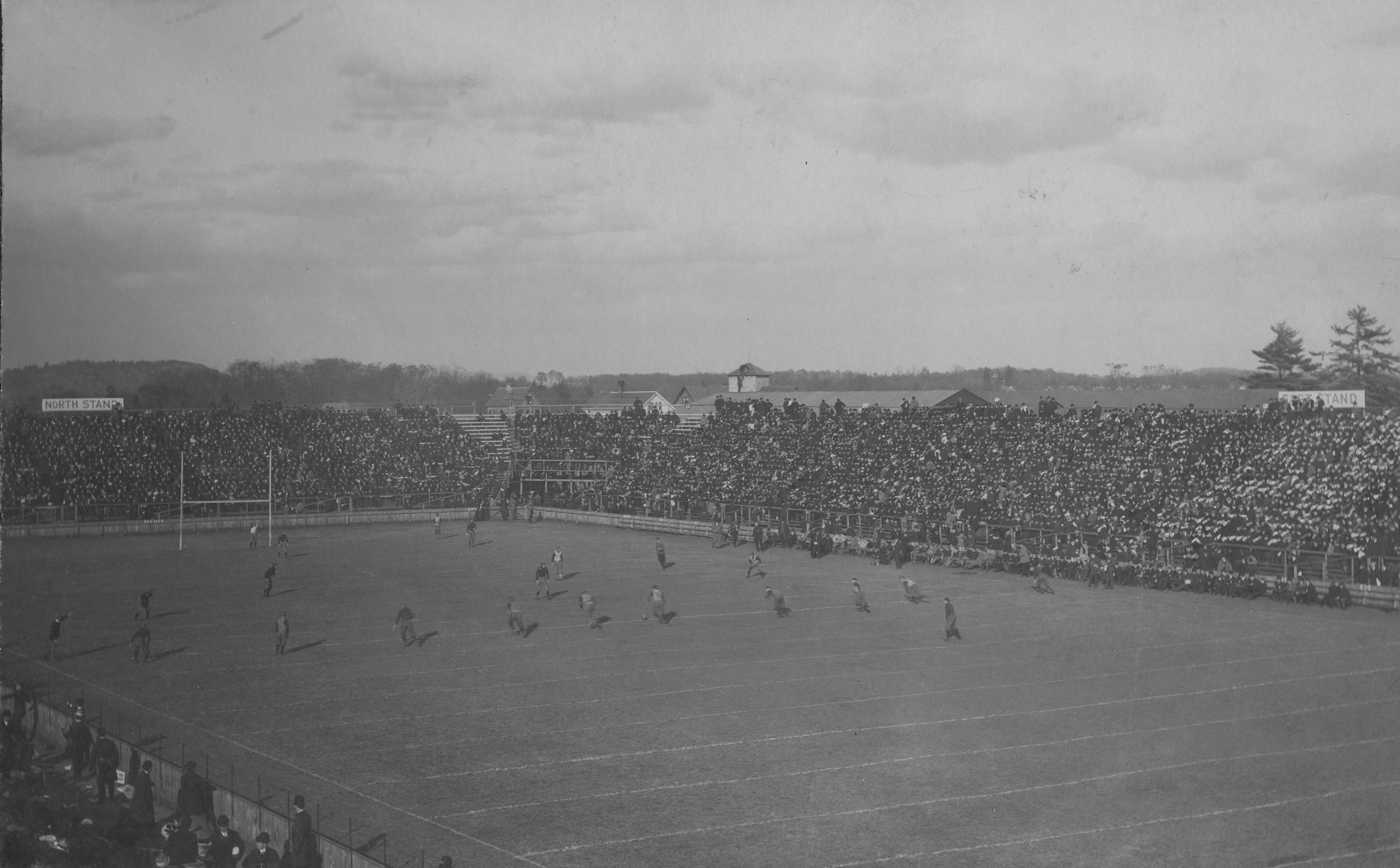
Kickoff of the Princeton–Yale football game in 1901.

School	1900 Conference	1901 Conference
Georgia Tech Yellow Jackets	SIAA	Independent
Louisiana Industrial Bulldogs	Program Established	Independent
Oklahoma A&M Aggies	Program established	Independent
Stetson Hatters	Program established	Independent

== Rose Bowl ==
The very first collegiate football bowl game was played following the 1901 season. Originally titled the "Tournament East-West football game" what is now known as the Rose Bowl Game was first played on January 1, 1902, in Pasadena, California. Michigan defeated Stanford 49–0.

== Conference standings ==
=== Major conference standings ===
1901 Colorado Football Association standings
	Conf.					Overall
Team	W		L		T	W		L		T
Colorado $	2	–	0	–	0	5	–	1	–	1
Colorado College	2	–	1	–	0	5	–	1	–	0
Colorado Mines	1	–	2	–	0	1	–	4	–	0
Colorado Agricultural	0	–	2	–	0	1	–	2	–	0
$ – Conference champion; Colorado vs. Colorado Agricultural game not played due to alleged amateurism violation

1901 Southern Intercollegiate Athletic Association football standings
	Conf.					Overall
Team	W		L		T	W		L		T
Vanderbilt $	4	–	0	–	0	6	–	1	–	1
Clemson	2	–	0	–	1	3	–	1	–	1
LSU	2	–	1	–	0	5	–	1	–	0
North Carolina	2	–	1	–	0	7	–	2	–	0
Tulane	2	–	1	–	0	4	–	2	–	0
Alabama	2	–	1	–	2	2	–	1	–	2
Auburn	2	–	2	–	1	2	–	3	–	1
Tennessee	1	–	1	–	2	3	–	3	–	2
Mississippi A&M	1	–	2	–	0	2	–	2	–	1
Georgia	0	–	3	–	2	1	–	5	–	2
Cumberland (TN)	0	–	1	–	0	0	–	3	–	0
Kentucky State	0	–	2	–	0	2	–	6	–	1
Ole Miss	0	–	4	–	0	2	–	4	–	0
Texas	0	–	0	–	0	8	–	2	–	1
$ – Conference champion

1901 Triangular Football League standings
	Conf.					Overall
Team	W		L		T	W		L		T
Williams $	2	–	0	–	0	6	–	4	–	0
Wesleyan	1	–	1	–	0	3	–	6	–	1
Amherst	0	–	2	–	0	4	–	6	–	2
$ – Conference champion

1901 Western Conference football standings
	Conf.					Overall
Team	W		L		T	W		L		T
Michigan +	4	–	0	–	0	11	–	0	–	0
Wisconsin +	2	–	0	–	0	9	–	0	–	0
Minnesota	3	–	1	–	0	9	–	1	–	1
Illinois	4	–	2	–	0	8	–	2	–	0
Northwestern	3	–	2	–	0	8	–	2	–	1
Indiana	1	–	2	–	0	6	–	3	–	0
Purdue	0	–	3	–	1	4	–	4	–	1
Chicago	0	–	4	–	1	8	–	6	–	2
Iowa	0	–	3	–	0	6	–	3	–	0
+ – Conference co-champions

=== Independents ===
1901 Eastern college football independents records
	Conf.			Overall
Team	W	L	T	W		L		T
Harvard		–		12	–	0	–	0
Yale		–		11	–	1	–	1
Cornell		–		11	–	1	–	0
Dartmouth		–		10	–	1	–	0
Massachusetts		–		9	–	1	–	0
Princeton		–		9	–	1	–	1
Syracuse		–		7	–	1	–	0
Geneva		–		7	–	1	–	1
Holy Cross		–		7	–	1	–	1
Army		–		5	–	1	–	2
Western U. of Penn		–		7	–	2	–	1
Lafayette		–		9	–	3	–	0
Swarthmore		–		8	–	2	–	2
Washington & Jefferson		–		6	–	2	–	2
Franklin & Marshall		–		7	–	3	–	1
Penn		–		10	–	5	–	0
Buffalo		–		4	–	2	–	0
Columbia		–		8	–	5	–	0
Fordham		–		2	–	1	–	1
Penn State		–		5	–	3	–	0
Bucknell		–		6	–	4	–	0
Temple		–		3	–	2	–	0
NYU		–		4	–	3	–	1
Pittsburgh College		–		3	–	3	–	0
Tufts		–		6	–	6	–	1
Vermont		–		5	–	5	–	1
Carlisle		–		5	–	7	–	1
Dickinson		–		4	–	6	–	0
Brown		–		4	–	7	–	1
Villanova		–		2	–	3	–	0
Drexel		–		2	–	5	–	1
Colgate		–		2	–	5	–	0
Boston College		–		1	–	8	–	0
Lehigh		–		1	–	11	–	0
New Hampshire		–		0	–	6	–	0
Rutgers		–		0	–	7	–	0

1901 Midwestern college football independents records
	Conf.			Overall
Team	W	L	T	W		L		T
Saint Louis		–		10	–	0	–	0
North Dakota Agricultural		–		7	–	0	–	0
Marquette		–		4	–	0	–	1
Northern Illinois State		–		6	–	1	–	0
Notre Dame		–		8	–	1	–	1
Ohio Wesleyan		–		8	–	2	–	0
Kirksville Osteopaths		–		10	–	3	–	0
Nebraska		–		6	–	2	–	0
Ohio		–		6	–	1	–	2
Doane		–		3	–	1	–	0
Haskell		–		6	–	2	–	0
Lake Forest		–		10	–	5	–	0
Ohio State		–		5	–	3	–	1
Washington University		–		5	–	3	–	1
Ohio Medical		–		5	–	3	–	1
Iowa State Normal		–		5	–	3	–	2
South Dakota Agricultural		–		3	–	2	–	0
Beloit		–		5	–	3	–	3
Washburn		–		3	–	2	–	3
Carthage		–		1	–	1	–	0
Drake		–		4	–	4	–	0
Detroit College		–		3	–	3	–	0
Mount Union		–		5	–	5	–	1
Wittenberg		–		4	–	4	–	0
Kansas State		–		3	–	4	–	1
Iowa State		–		2	–	6	–	2
Kansas		–		3	–	5	–	2
Wabash		–		4	–	7	–	0
Fairmount		–		3	–	6	–	0
Heidelberg		–		1	–	3	–	1
Miami (OH)		–		1	–	3	–	1
Cincinnati		–		1	–	4	–	1
Case		–		2	–	7	–	0
Missouri		–		1	–	6	–	1
Butler		–		0	–	1	–	0
Chicago Eclectic Medical		–		0	–	3	–	0

1901 Southern college football independents records
	Conf.			Overall
Team	W	L	T	W		L		T
Southwestern Louisiana Industrial		–		2	–	0	–	0
Stetson		–		1	–	0	–	0
Georgia Tech		–		4	–	0	–	1
Marshall		–		2	–	0	–	1
Kentucky University		–		7	–	1	–	1
VPI		–		6	–	1	–	0
Nashville		–		6	–	1	–	1
Virginia		–		8	–	2	–	0
Texas		–		8	–	2	–	1
Davidson		–		4	–	2	–	0
Baylor		–		5	–	3	–	0
Gallaudet		–		4	–	2	–	2
Sewanee		–		4	–	2	–	2
William & Mary		–		2	–	1	–	1
Navy		–		6	–	4	–	1
VMI		–		4	–	3	–	0
Oklahoma		–		3	–	2	–	0
West Virginia		–		3	–	2	–	0
Delaware		–		5	–	4	–	0
Georgetown		–		3	–	3	–	2
Kendall		–		2	–	2	–	0
Spring Hill		–		0	–	0	–	1
Wilmington Conference Academy		–		2	–	2	–	0
Oklahoma A&M		–		2	–	3	–	0
South Carolina		–		3	–	4	–	0
Arkansas		–		3	–	5	–	0
Add-Ran		–		1	–	2	–	1
Furman		–		1	–	2	–	1
Chilocco		–		2	–	5	–	0
North Carolina A&M		–		1	–	2	–	0
Texas A&M		–		1	–	4	–	0
Maryland		–		1	–	7	–	0
Richmond		–		1	–	7	–	0
Florida Agricultural		–		0	–	1	–	0
Louisiana Industrial		–		0	–	2	–	0
Tusculum		–				–

1901 Far West college football independents records
	Conf.			Overall
Team	W	L	T	W		L		T
Wyoming		–		1	–	0	–	0
California		–		9	–	0	–	1
Arizona		–		4	–	1	–	0
Washington Agricultural		–		4	–	1	–	0
Utah		–		3	–	1	–	0
Montana Agricultural		–		2	–	1	–	0
New Mexico A&M		–		2	–	1	–	0
Utah Agricultural		–		3	–	2	–	0
Stanford		–		3	–	2	–	2
Idaho		–		3	–	2	–	1
Washington		–		3	–	3	–	0
Nevada State		–		3	–	3	–	0
Oregon		–		3	–	4	–	1
Montana		–		2	–	3	–	0
Cheney Normal		–		1	–	2	–	0
Oregon Agricultural		–		1	–	2	–	0
New Mexico		–		0	–	3	–	1
USC		–		0	–	2	–	0

=== Minor conferences ===
Conference	Champion(s)	Record
Michigan Intercollegiate Athletic Association	Olivet	7–0

== Awards and honors ==
=== All-Americans ===
The consensus All-America team included:

Position	Name	Height	Weight (lbs.)	Class	Hometown	Team
QB	Charles Dudley Daly	5'7"	152	Jr.	Boston, Massachusetts	Army
HB	Robert Kernan			Jr.	Brooklyn, New York	Harvard
HB	Harold Weekes	5'10"	178	Jr.	Oyster Bay, New York	Columbia
HB	Bill Morley	5'10"	166	Sr.	Cimarron, New Mexico	Columbia
FB	Blondy Graydon			Jr.	Cincinnati, Ohio	Harvard
E	Dave Campbell	6'0"	171	Sr.	Waltham, Massachusetts	Harvard
E	Ralph Tipton Davis	5'7"	168	So.	Blossburg, Pennsylvania	Princeton
T	Oliver Cutts			Sr.	North Anson, Maine	Harvard
T	Paul Bunker	5'11"	186	Jr.	Alpena, Michigan	Army
G	Bill Warner	6'4"	210	Jr.	Springville, New York	Cornell
G	William George Lee			Sr.	Leavenworth, Kansas	Harvard
C	Henry Holt			Jr.	Spuyten Duyvil, Bronx, New York	Yale
C	Walter E. Bachman			Sr.	Phillipsburg, New Jersey	Lafayette
G	Charles A. Barnard			Sr.	Washington, D. C.	Harvard
G	Sanford Hunt			So.	Irvington, New Jersey	Cornell
T	Crawford Blagden			Sr.	New York, New York	Harvard
E	Edward Bowditch			So.	Albany, New York	Harvard
E	Neil Snow	5'8"	190	Sr.	Detroit, Michigan	Michigan

=== Statistical leaders ===
- Player scoring most points: Bruce Shorts, Michigan, 123
- Rushing leader: Willie Heston, Michigan, 684
- Rushing avg. leader: Willie Heston, 10.2
- Rushing touchdowns leader: Willie Heston, 20
