= 1895 Yale Bulldogs football team =

American college football season

1895 Yale Bulldogs football
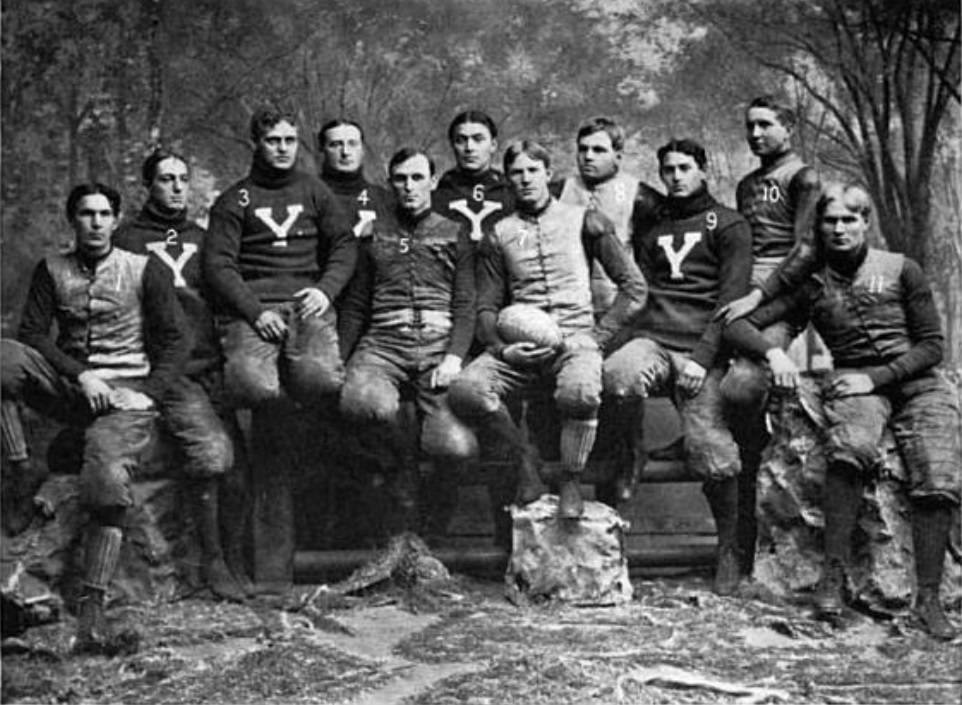

Co-national champion (Davis)
- Conference: Independent
- Record: 13–0–2
- Head coach: John A. Hartwell (1st season)
- Captain: Sam Thorne
- Home stadium: Yale Field

1895 Eastern college football independents records
	Conf.			Overall
Team	W	L	T	W		L		T
Penn		–		14	–	0	–	0
Yale		–		13	–	0	–	2
Princeton		–		10	–	1	–	1
Washington & Jefferson		–		6	–	1	–	1
Harvard		–		8	–	2	–	1
Lafayette		–		6	–	2	–	0
Syracuse		–		6	–	2	–	2
Army		–		5	–	2	–	0
Bucknell		–		5	–	2	–	0
Colgate		–		4	–	2	–	0
Swarthmore		–		7	–	4	–	1
Tufts		–		8	–	5	–	0
Villanova		–		4	–	2	–	0
Wesleyan		–		6	–	3	–	0
Brown		–		7	–	6	–	1
Carlisle		–		4	–	4	–	0
Drexel		–		3	–	3	–	1
Rhode Island		–		1	–	1	–	0
Penn State		–		2	–	2	–	3
Cornell		–		3	–	4	–	1
Rutgers		–		3	–	4	–	0
New Hampshire		–		2	–	3	–	1
Franklin & Marshall		–		3	–	5	–	1
Boston College		–		2	–	4	–	2
Lehigh		–		3	–	6	–	0
CCNY		–		2	–	5	–	1
Buffalo		–		1	–	4	–	2
Temple		–		1	–	4	–	1
MIT		–		1	–	4	–	0
Trinity (CT)		–		1	–	4	–	0
Massachusetts		–		1	–	5	–	0
Western Univ. Penn.		–		1	–	6	–	0
Geneva		–		0	–	5	–	0
NYU		–		0	–	5	–	0

The 1895 Yale Bulldogs football team was an American football team that represented Yale University as an independent during the 1895 college football season. The team finished with a 13–0–2 record, shut out 10 of 15 opponents, and outscored all opponents by a total of 318 to 38. John A. Hartwell was the head coach, and Sam Thorne was the team captain.

There was no contemporaneous system in 1895 for determining a national champion. However, Yale was retroactively named as the co-national champion by Parke H. Davis. Most selectors designated Penn (perfect 14–0 record) as the national champion for 1895; Yale and Penn did not play during the 1895 season.

Two Yale players were selected as consensus first-team players on the 1895 All-America team. The team's consensus All-Americans were: halfback Sam Thorne and tackle Fred T. Murphy.

== Schedule ==
Date	Time	Opponent	Site	Result	Attendance	Source
September 28		at Trinity (CT)	Hartford, CT	W 8–0	800	
October 2		Brown	Yale Field; New Haven, CT	W 4–0		
October 5		at Union (NY)	Ridgefield Athletic Grounds; Albany, NY	W 26–0	5,000	
October 9		Amherst	Yale Field; New Haven, CT	W 38–0		
October 12		at Crescent Athletic Club	Eastern Park; Brooklyn, NY	W 8–2		
October 16		Dartmouth	Yale Field; New Haven, CT	W 26–0		
October 19	3:30 p.m.	at Orange Athletic Club	Orange Oval; Orange, NJ	W 24–12	6,000	
October 23		Williams	Yale Field; New Haven, CT	W 54–0		
October 26		Boston Athletic Association	Yale Field; New Haven, CT	T 0–0		
October 30		Dartmouth	Yale Field; New Haven, CT	W 32–0	1,500	
November 2		at Army	The Plain; West Point, NY	W 28–8		
November 6		Carlisle	Yale Field; New Haven, CT	W 18–0		
November 9		at Brown	Adelaide Park; Providence, RI	T 6–6	3,000	
November 16		at Orange Athletic Club	Orange, NJ	W 26–0		
November 23		vs. Princeton	Polo Grounds; New York, NY (rivalry)	W 20–10	35,000	

== Roster ==
- Lyman M. Bass, E
- Frederick G. Beck
- Hamilton F. Benjamin, HB
- Alexander Brown
- Henry G. Campbell
- Charles Chadwick, G
- Burr Chamberlain, T
- Harry P. Cross, C
- W. Redmond Cross, G
- Charles de Saulles, QB
- Clarence DeWitt, HB
- Morris Ely, HB
- Clarence Fincke, QB
- John Campbell Greenway, E
- John A. Hall, E
- Hammond, HB
- George B. Hatch
- Josiah J. Hazen, E
- Louis Hinkey, E
- Charles Ives, E
- Alexander Jerrems, FB
- Langford, G
- Lee, E
- Harold W. Letton, HB
- John M. Longacre, G
- John S. McFarland, G
- Miller, QB
- Paul D. Mills, HB
- Moncke, T
- Charles S. Morris, T
- Fred T. Murphy, T
- Lang Murray, T
- Polk, QB
- James O. Rodgers, T
- George Sanford, G
- Richard Sheldon, G
- Squire, HB
- Dudley Sutphin, T
- Alfred H. Thomas, QB
- Sam Thorne, HB
- Whitcomb, T

Posed photo of the full roster of the 1895 Yale football team
