= 1895 Princeton Tigers football team =

American college football season

1895 Princeton Tigers football
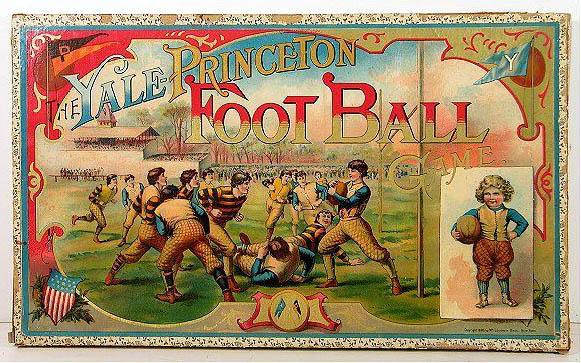
- Illustration of a 1895 Princeton v Yale game
- Conference: Independent
- Record: 10–1–1
- Head coach: None
- Captain: Langdon Lea

1895 Eastern college football independents records
	Conf.			Overall
Team	W	L	T	W		L		T
Penn		–		14	–	0	–	0
Yale		–		13	–	0	–	2
Princeton		–		10	–	1	–	1
Washington & Jefferson		–		6	–	1	–	1
Harvard		–		8	–	2	–	1
Lafayette		–		6	–	2	–	0
Syracuse		–		6	–	2	–	2
Army		–		5	–	2	–	0
Bucknell		–		5	–	2	–	0
Colgate		–		4	–	2	–	0
Swarthmore		–		7	–	4	–	1
Tufts		–		8	–	5	–	0
Villanova		–		4	–	2	–	0
Wesleyan		–		6	–	3	–	0
Amherst		–		6	–	5	–	0
Brown		–		7	–	6	–	1
Carlisle		–		4	–	4	–	0
Drexel		–		3	–	3	–	1
Rhode Island		–		1	–	1	–	0
Penn State		–		2	–	2	–	3
Cornell		–		3	–	4	–	1
Rutgers		–		3	–	4	–	0
New Hampshire		–		2	–	3	–	1
Franklin & Marshall		–		3	–	5	–	1
Boston College		–		2	–	4	–	2
Lehigh		–		3	–	6	–	0
CCNY		–		2	–	5	–	1
Buffalo		–		1	–	4	–	2
Temple		–		1	–	4	–	1
MIT		–		1	–	4	–	0
Trinity (CT)		–		1	–	4	–	0
Massachusetts		–		1	–	5	–	0
Western Univ. Penn.		–		1	–	6	–	0
Geneva		–		0	–	5	–	0
NYU		–		0	–	5	–	0

The 1895 Princeton Tigers football team represented Princeton University in the 1895 college football season. The team finished with a 10–1–1 record. The Tigers recorded nine shutouts and outscored opponents by a combined score of 224 to 28. The team's sole loss was in the last game of the season by a 20–10 score against Yale.

Two Princeton players, tackle Langdon Lea and guard Dudley Riggs, were consensus first-team honorees on the 1895 College Football All-America Team.

== Schedule ==
Date	Opponent	Site	Result	Attendance	Source
October 2	at Elizabeth Athletic Club	Elizabeth, NJ	W 40–0		
October 5	Rutgers	University Field; Princeton, NJ (rivalry)	W 22–0		
October 9	vs. Virginia	Catonsville Country Club; Baltimore, MD	W 36–0	3,000	
October 12	Lafayette	University Field; Princeton, NJ	W 14–0		
October 15	at Lawrenceville School	Lawrenceville Grounds; Lawrenceville, NJ	W 38–0		
October 17	Princeton Seminary	University Field; Princeton, NJ	W 10–4		
October 19	vs. Lehigh	Philadelphia Ball Park; Philadelphia, PA	W 16–0	2,000	
October 23	Union (NY)	University Field; Princeton, NJ	W 22–0		
October 26	at Orange Athletic Club	Orange Oval; Orange, NJ	T 0–0	3,000	
November 2	Harvard	University Field; Princeton, NJ (rivalry)	W 12–4	6,000	
November 9	vs. Cornell	Manhattan Field; New York, NY	W 6–0		
November 23	vs. Yale	Manhattan Field; New York, NY (rivalry)	L 10–20	35,000	

== Roster ==
- Armstrong, HB
- Ayers, HB
- W. H. Bannard, FB
- John Baird, HB
- Brokaw, QB
- William W. Church, T
- Garrett Cochran, E
- Dickey, C
- David Farragut Edwards, HB
- Fulton, HB
- Robert Gailey, C
- Hearn, E
- Hinson, E
- Hunt, C
- Gordon Johnston, E
- Jordan, G
- Addison Kelly, HB
- James Knight, E
- Langdon Lea, T
- Neilson Poe, HB
- Pope, FB
- Rhodes, G
- Dudley Riggs, G
- Rosengarten, HB
- Smith, QB
- Billy Suter, HB
- Albert Tyler, T
- Wentz, G
