= 1895 Colgate football team =

American college football season

1895 Colgate football
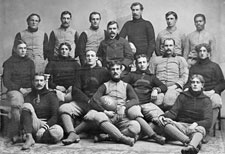
- Conference: Independent
- Record: 4–2
- Head coach: L. Jay Caldwell (2nd season)
- Captain: L. Jay Caldwell

1895 Eastern college football independents records
	Conf.			Overall
Team	W	L	T	W		L		T
Penn		–		14	–	0	–	0
Yale		–		13	–	0	–	2
Princeton		–		10	–	1	–	1
Washington & Jefferson		–		6	–	1	–	1
Harvard		–		8	–	2	–	1
Lafayette		–		6	–	2	–	0
Syracuse		–		6	–	2	–	2
Army		–		5	–	2	–	0
Bucknell		–		5	–	2	–	0
Colgate		–		4	–	2	–	0
Swarthmore		–		7	–	4	–	1
Tufts		–		8	–	5	–	0
Villanova		–		4	–	2	–	0
Wesleyan		–		6	–	3	–	0
Amherst		–		6	–	5	–	0
Brown		–		7	–	6	–	1
Carlisle		–		4	–	4	–	0
Drexel		–		3	–	3	–	1
Rhode Island		–		1	–	1	–	0
Penn State		–		2	–	2	–	3
Cornell		–		3	–	4	–	1
Rutgers		–		3	–	4	–	0
New Hampshire		–		2	–	3	–	1
Franklin & Marshall		–		3	–	5	–	1
Boston College		–		2	–	4	–	2
Lehigh		–		3	–	6	–	0
CCNY		–		2	–	5	–	1
Buffalo		–		1	–	4	–	2
Temple		–		1	–	4	–	1
MIT		–		1	–	4	–	0
Trinity (CT)		–		1	–	4	–	0
Massachusetts		–		1	–	5	–	0
Western Univ. Penn.		–		1	–	6	–	0
Geneva		–		0	–	5	–	0
NYU		–		0	–	5	–	0

The 1895 Colgate football team represented Colgate University in the 1895 college football season. The team captain for the 1895 season was L. Jay Caldwell.

== Schedule ==
Date	Opponent	Site	Result	Source
October 2	St. John's Military Academy	Hamilton, NY	W 4–0	
October 5	at Williams	Weston Field; Williamstown, MA	L 6–30	
October 12	Hobart	Hamilton, NY	W 64–0	
November 2	RPI	Hamilton, NY	W 30–0	
November 9	at Syracuse	Syracuse, NY (rivalry)	L 0–4	
November 14	at Syracuse A.A.	Syracuse, NY	W 14–4	
