= 1895 Cornell Big Red football team =

American college football season

1895 Cornell Big Red football
- Conference: Independent
- Record: 3–4–1
- Head coach: Marshall Newell (2nd season)
- Captain: Clint Wyckoff
- Home stadium: Percy Field

1895 Eastern college football independents records
	Conf.			Overall
Team	W	L	T	W		L		T
Penn		–		14	–	0	–	0
Yale		–		13	–	0	–	2
Princeton		–		10	–	1	–	1
Washington & Jefferson		–		6	–	1	–	1
Harvard		–		8	–	2	–	1
Lafayette		–		6	–	2	–	0
Syracuse		–		6	–	2	–	2
Army		–		5	–	2	–	0
Bucknell		–		5	–	2	–	0
Colgate		–		4	–	2	–	0
Swarthmore		–		7	–	4	–	1
Tufts		–		8	–	5	–	0
Villanova		–		4	–	2	–	0
Wesleyan		–		6	–	3	–	0
Amherst		–		6	–	5	–	0
Brown		–		7	–	6	–	1
Carlisle		–		4	–	4	–	0
Drexel		–		3	–	3	–	1
Rhode Island		–		1	–	1	–	0
Penn State		–		2	–	2	–	3
Cornell		–		3	–	4	–	1
Rutgers		–		3	–	4	–	0
New Hampshire		–		2	–	3	–	1
Franklin & Marshall		–		3	–	5	–	1
Boston College		–		2	–	4	–	2
Lehigh		–		3	–	6	–	0
CCNY		–		2	–	5	–	1
Buffalo		–		1	–	4	–	2
Temple		–		1	–	4	–	1
MIT		–		1	–	4	–	0
Trinity (CT)		–		1	–	4	–	0
Massachusetts		–		1	–	5	–	0
Western Univ. Penn.		–		1	–	6	–	0
Geneva		–		0	–	5	–	0
NYU		–		0	–	5	–	0

The 1895 Cornell Big Red football team was an American football team that represented Cornell University during the 1895 college football season. In their second season under head coach Marshall Newell, the Big Red compiled a 3–4–1 record and outscored all opponents by a combined total of 162 to 82. Quarterback and team captain Clint Wyckoff was selected by both Walter Camp and Caspar Whitney as a first-team player on the 1895 College Football All-America Team and was later inducted into the College Football Hall of Fame.

== Schedule ==
Date	Time	Opponent	Site	Result	Attendance	Source
September 26		Syracuse	Percy Field; Ithaca, NY	W 8–0		
October 5		Penn State	Percy Field; Ithaca, NY	T 0–0	1,000	
October 12		Western Reserve	Percy Field; Ithaca, NY	W 12–4		
October 19		Lafayette	Percy Field; Ithaca, NY	L 0–6		
October 26		at Harvard	Soldiers' Field; Cambridge, MA	L 0–25		
November 9		vs. Princeton	Manhattan Field; New York, NY	L 0–6		
November 16	3:20 p.m.	Brown	Percy Field; Ithaca, NY	W 6–4		
November 28		at Penn	Franklin Field; Philadelphia, PA (rivalry)	L 2–46	20,000	
