= H. W. Ambruster =

American football coach, chemical engineer, actor, and lecturer

Biographical details
- Born: 1879
- Died: January 10, 1961 (aged 82); Fanwood, New Jersey, U.S.

Coaching career (HC unless noted)
- 1895: Rutgers

Head coaching record
- Overall: 3–4

Howard Watson Ambruster (1879 – January 10, 1961) was an American football coach, chemical engineer, actor, and lecturer. He was the head football coach at Rutgers University for one season, in 1895, compiling a record of 3–4. Armbruster also played tennis and competed in the 1899 Pennsylvania Lawn Tennis Championships.

Ambruster attended Germantown Academy. He entered the University of Pennsylvania Wharton School class of 1899, but left the school before graduating to coach football at Rutgers. A longtime resident of Westfield, New Jersey, he moved to Fanwood, New Jersey in 1949, and died at his home there, at the age of 82, on January 10, 1961. He was interred at Ivy Hill Cemetery in Philadelphia.

== Head coaching record ==
| Year | Team | Overall | Conference | Standing | Bowl/playoffs |
|---|---|---|---|---|---|
Rutgers Queensmen (Independent) (1895)
| 1895 | Rutgers | 3–4 | | | |
| Rutgers: | | 3–4 | | | |
| Total: | | 3–4 | | | |
