= 1895 Carlisle Indians football team =

American college football season

1895 Carlisle Indians football
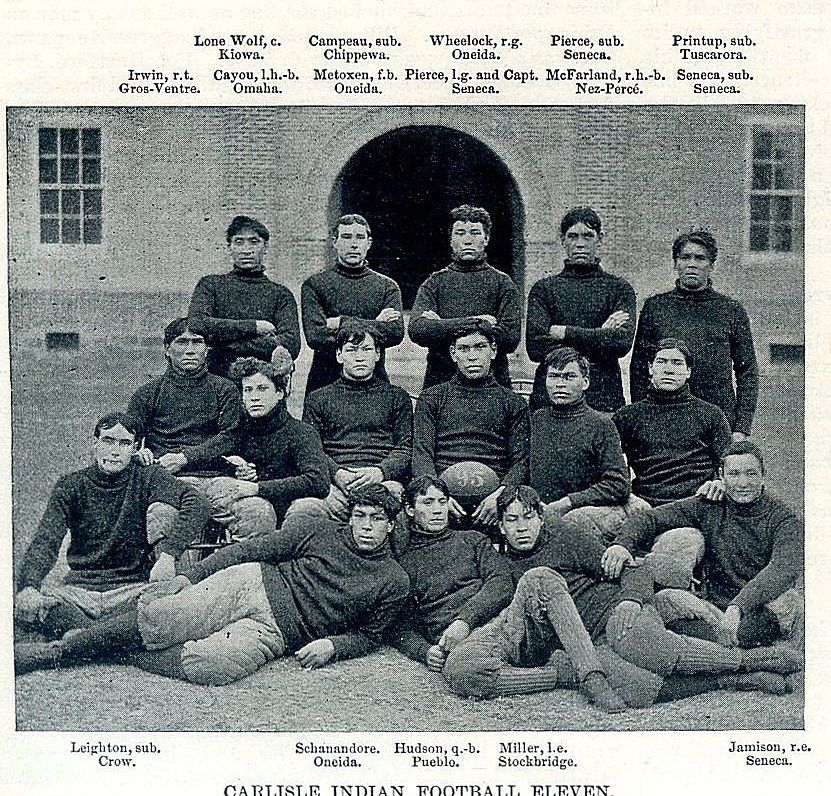
- Conference: Independent
- Record: 4–4
- Head coach: Vance C. McCormick (2nd season)
- Captain: Bemus Pierce

1895 Eastern college football independents records
	Conf.			Overall
Team	W	L	T	W		L		T
Penn		–		14	–	0	–	0
Yale		–		13	–	0	–	2
Princeton		–		10	–	1	–	1
Washington & Jefferson		–		6	–	1	–	1
Harvard		–		8	–	2	–	1
Lafayette		–		6	–	2	–	0
Syracuse		–		6	–	2	–	2
Army		–		5	–	2	–	0
Bucknell		–		5	–	2	–	0
Colgate		–		4	–	2	–	0
Swarthmore		–		7	–	4	–	1
Tufts		–		8	–	5	–	0
Villanova		–		4	–	2	–	0
Wesleyan		–		6	–	3	–	0
Amherst		–		6	–	5	–	0
Brown		–		7	–	6	–	1
Carlisle		–		4	–	4	–	0
Drexel		–		3	–	3	–	1
Rhode Island		–		1	–	1	–	0
Penn State		–		2	–	2	–	3
Cornell		–		3	–	4	–	1
Rutgers		–		3	–	4	–	0
New Hampshire		–		2	–	3	–	1
Franklin & Marshall		–		3	–	5	–	1
Boston College		–		2	–	4	–	2
Lehigh		–		3	–	6	–	0
CCNY		–		2	–	5	–	1
Buffalo		–		1	–	4	–	2
Temple		–		1	–	4	–	1
MIT		–		1	–	4	–	0
Trinity (CT)		–		1	–	4	–	0
Massachusetts		–		1	–	5	–	0
Western Univ. Penn.		–		1	–	6	–	0
Geneva		–		0	–	5	–	0
NYU		–		0	–	5	–	0

The 1895 Carlisle Indians football team represented the Carlisle Indian Industrial School as an independent during the 1895 college football season. Led by Vance C. McCormick in his second and final season as head coach, the Indians compiled a record of 4–4.

== Schedule ==
Date	Time	Opponent	Site	Result	Attendance	Source
October 5		at Gettysburg	Gettysburg, PA	W 10–0		
October 12		at Duquesne Country and Athletic Club	Exposition Park; Pittsburgh, PA	W 16–4		
October 16		at Penn	Franklin Field; Philadelphia, PA	L 0–36		
October 26		at Navy	Worden Field; Annapolis, MD	L 0–34		
November 6		at Yale	Yale Field; New Haven, CT	L 0–18		
November 16	2:30 p.m.	at Bucknell	Bucknell campus; Lewisburg, PA	L 4–18		
November 21		at York YMCA	York, PA	W 42–0		
November 28		at Manhattan YMCA	Manhattan Field; Manhattan, NY	W 16–4	1,500	
