= 1895 New Hampshire football team =

American college football season

1895 New Hampshire football
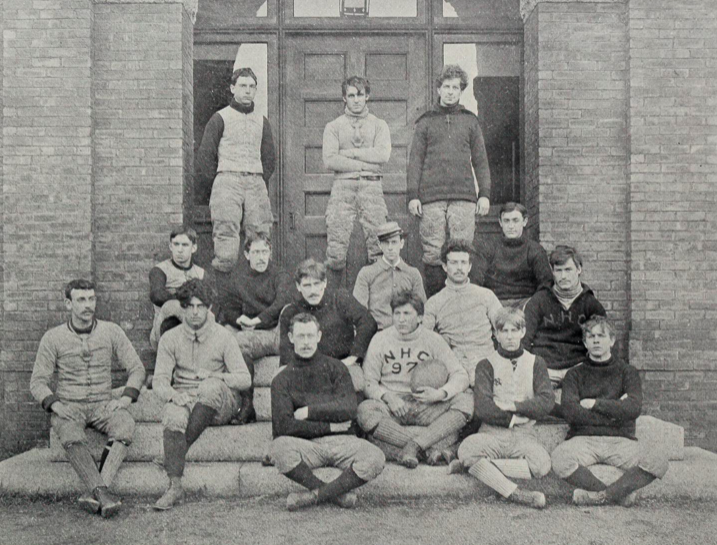
- Everett Whittemore is seated holding football, Fred Hayes is standing at back-right
- Conference: Independent
- Record: 2–3–1 (Note: per the University's media guide; 1895 sources differ)
- Head coach: None
- Captain: Everett S. Whittemore & Fred F. Hayes
- Home stadium: College grounds, Durham, NH

1895 Eastern college football independents records
	Conf.			Overall
Team	W	L	T	W		L		T
Penn		–		14	–	0	–	0
Yale		–		13	–	0	–	2
Princeton		–		10	–	1	–	1
Washington & Jefferson		–		6	–	1	–	1
Harvard		–		8	–	2	–	1
Lafayette		–		6	–	2	–	0
Syracuse		–		6	–	2	–	2
Army		–		5	–	2	–	0
Bucknell		–		5	–	2	–	0
Colgate		–		4	–	2	–	0
Swarthmore		–		7	–	4	–	1
Tufts		–		8	–	5	–	0
Villanova		–		4	–	2	–	0
Wesleyan		–		6	–	3	–	0
Amherst		–		6	–	5	–	0
Brown		–		7	–	6	–	1
Carlisle		–		4	–	4	–	0
Drexel		–		3	–	3	–	1
Rhode Island		–		1	–	1	–	0
Penn State		–		2	–	2	–	3
Cornell		–		3	–	4	–	1
Rutgers		–		3	–	4	–	0
New Hampshire		–		2	–	3	–	1
Franklin & Marshall		–		3	–	5	–	1
Boston College		–		2	–	4	–	2
Lehigh		–		3	–	6	–	0
CCNY		–		2	–	5	–	1
Buffalo		–		1	–	4	–	2
Temple		–		1	–	4	–	1
MIT		–		1	–	4	–	0
Trinity (CT)		–		1	–	4	–	0
Massachusetts		–		1	–	5	–	0
Western Univ. Penn.		–		1	–	6	–	0
Geneva		–		0	–	5	–	0
NYU		–		0	–	5	–	0

The 1895 New Hampshire football team (Note: The school did not adopt the Wildcats nickname until February 1926; before then, they were generally referred to as "the blue and white".) was an American football team that represented New Hampshire College of Agriculture and the Mechanic Arts (Note: The school was often referred to as New Hampshire College or New Hampshire State College in newspapers of the era.) during the 1895 college football season—the school became the University of New Hampshire in 1923. The team played a six-game schedule without facing any other college teams, and finished with a record of 1–4–1 or 2–3–1, per 1895 sources or modern sources, respectively.

At the close of the 1894 season, the team had selected William C. Dudley to again captain the 1895 squad. However, with Dudley and seven other members of the team having left college, Everett S. Whittemore became captain of the 1895 squad, until he resigned the position mid-season and was replaced by Fred F. Hayes.

== Schedule ==
Scoring during this era awarded 4 points for a touchdown, 2 points for a conversion kick (extra point), and 5 points for a field goal. Teams played in the one-platoon system and the forward pass was not yet legal. Games were played in two halves rather than four quarters.

Date	Opponent	Site	per 1895 sources		per modern sources	
Date	Opponent	Site	Result	Source	Result	Source
September 21	at Exeter Academy	Exeter, NH	L 0–29		L 0–29	
September 28	Dover YMCA	Durham, NH	T 6–6		T 6–6	
October 12	Portsmouth Athletic Assoc.	unknown	L 0–22		not listed	
October 19	at Dover YMCA	Burgett Park · Dover, NH	L 10–14		L 10–14	
November 2	Somersworth High School	Durham, NH	W 10–6		W 10–6	
November 2	at Berwick Academy	South Berwick, ME	NH second team		W 14–6	
November 16	at Brewster Academy	Wolfeboro, NH	L 10–14		L 10–14	
Overall record			(1–4–1)		(2–3–1)	

A report in The New Hampshire College Monthly by the team's student manager stated that the team played six games, Recaps of seven games were provided in the College Monthly; six varsity contests plus a game played by the second team (backups). On November 2, the varsity defeated Somersworth High School while the second team defeated Berwick Academy. College Football Data Warehouse and the Wildcats' media guide list both of those contests, while omitting the October 12 loss against the Portsmouth Athletic Association. While the student manager's report noted that the "Portsmouth game was postponed three times", the College Monthly is clear that the game did get played; thus it is included in the overall record per 1895 sources, in lieu of the second team's win over Berwick Academy.

== Roster ==
Name	Position	Team photo location
John W. Ash	center	seated, front row, center-left in black sweater
David B. Bartlett	quarterback	seated, front row, second from right
J. S. Black	left guard	seated, middle row, center-left in black shirt
Walter F. Buck	right halfback	standing, left
Richard C. Butterfield	right guard	seated, middle row, center-right in white shirt
Henry M. Chamberlain	fullback	standing, center
Elwin H. Forristall	right end	seated, front row, far left
Fred F. Hayes	left halfback	standing, right
J. A. Langlier	substitute	seated, back row, far right
Herbert F. Moore	substitute	seated, back row, second from left
Gerry A. Morgan	substitute	seated, back row, far left
J. N. G. Nesbit	left end	seated, front row, far right
Fred D. Sanborn	right tackle	seated, front row, second from left
D. R. Taft	student manager	seated, back row, wearing hat
Everett S. Whittemore	center	seated, front row, with football
Walter M. Wiggin (Note: Wiggin drowned in January 1896 "while skating upon the College reservoir.")	left tackle	seated, middle row, at right with NHC sweater
