= 1895 Western University of Pennsylvania football team =

American college football season

1895 Western University of Pennsylvania football
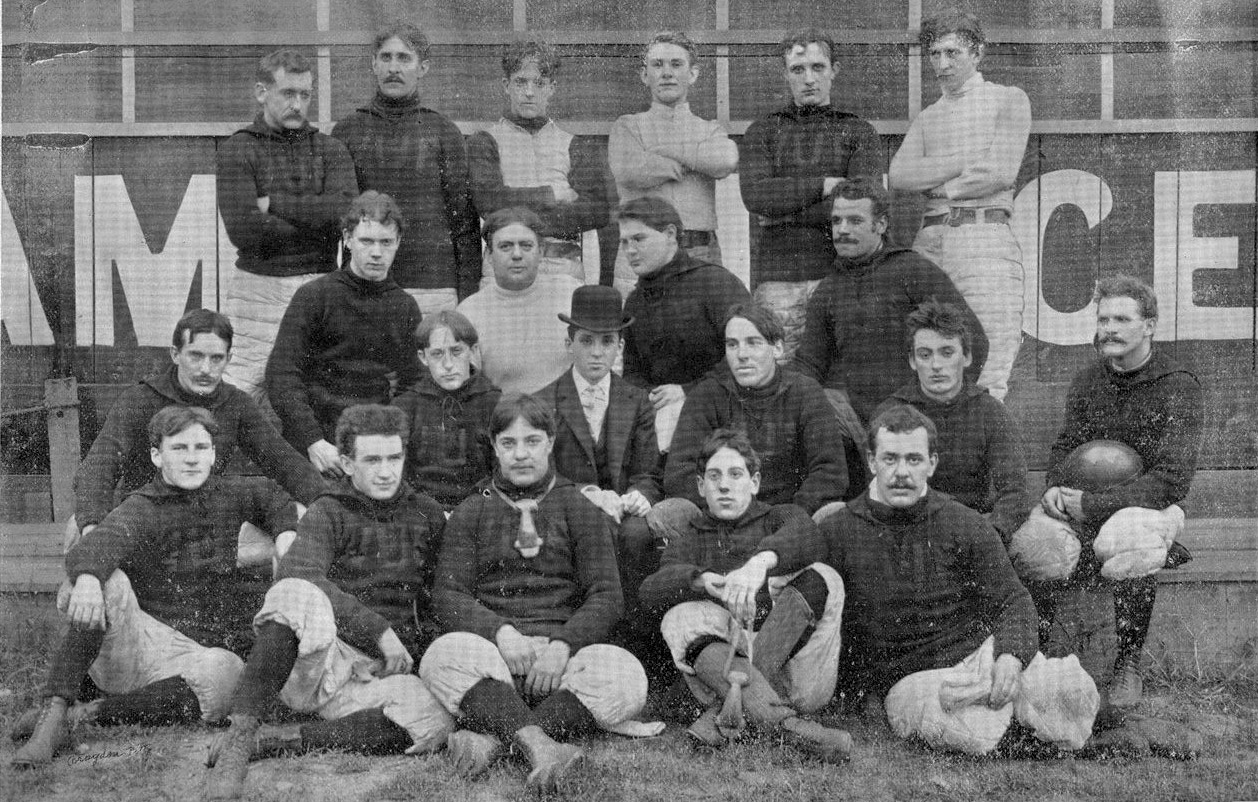
- Conference: Independent
- Record: 1–6
- Head coach: J. P. Linn (1st season)

1895 Eastern college football independents records
	Conf.			Overall
Team	W	L	T	W		L		T
Penn		–		14	–	0	–	0
Yale		–		13	–	0	–	2
Princeton		–		10	–	1	–	1
Washington & Jefferson		–		6	–	1	–	1
Harvard		–		8	–	2	–	1
Lafayette		–		6	–	2	–	0
Syracuse		–		6	–	2	–	2
Army		–		5	–	2	–	0
Bucknell		–		5	–	2	–	0
Colgate		–		4	–	2	–	0
Swarthmore		–		7	–	4	–	1
Tufts		–		8	–	5	–	0
Villanova		–		4	–	2	–	0
Wesleyan		–		6	–	3	–	0
Brown		–		7	–	6	–	1
Carlisle		–		4	–	4	–	0
Drexel		–		3	–	3	–	1
Rhode Island		–		1	–	1	–	0
Penn State		–		2	–	2	–	3
Cornell		–		3	–	4	–	1
Rutgers		–		3	–	4	–	0
New Hampshire		–		2	–	3	–	1
Franklin & Marshall		–		3	–	5	–	1
Boston College		–		2	–	4	–	2
Lehigh		–		3	–	6	–	0
CCNY		–		2	–	5	–	1
Buffalo		–		1	–	4	–	2
Temple		–		1	–	4	–	1
MIT		–		1	–	4	–	0
Trinity (CT)		–		1	–	4	–	0
Massachusetts		–		1	–	5	–	0
Western Univ. Penn.		–		1	–	6	–	0
Geneva		–		0	–	5	–	0
NYU		–		0	–	5	–	0

The 1895 Western University of Pennsylvania football team was an American football team that represented the Western University of Pennsylvania (now known as the University of Pittsburgh) as an independent during the 1895 college football season.

== Schedule ==
Date	Opponent	Site	Result	Attendance	Source
October 5	at Duquesne Country and Athletic Club	Exposition Park; Pittsburgh, PA	L 0–36	550	
October 12	at Greensburg Athletic Association	Greensburg, PA	L 2–42	300	
October 19	at Emerald Athletic Association	Emerald Park; Pittsburgh, PA	W 22–0	2,000	
October 26	at West Virginia	Morgantown, WV (Backyard Brawl)	L 0–8		
November 2	at Washington & Jefferson	Washington, PA	L 0–28		
November 12	at Carnegie Athletic Club	Braddock, PA	L 6–10	1,500	
November 28	at Wheeling Tigers	State Fairgrounds; Wheeling, WV	L 0–12	2,500	

== Season recap ==
The Alumni Athletic Advisory Board led by J.D. Scott, one of Pitt football's founding fathers, and the Athletic Association re-energized the Athletic Department at the Western University of Pennsylvania following the disarray of 1893 and 1894. Their first objective in the fall of 1895 was to place a football team on the field. W. A. Stuart, a former State College fullback, was hired to coach the team. After the first two games coach Stuart was dismissed and J. P. Linn replaced him. Coach Linn had played end at Washington & Jefferson University. He coached the remaining five games of the season and then departed for Seminary School. In its first and only season under head coach J. P. Linn, the team compiled a 1–6 record and was outscored by a total of 136 to 30.

== Game summaries ==
=== At Duquesne Country and Athletic Club ===
WUP at D.C. & A.C.

Team	1	2	Total
WUP	0	0	0
• D.C. & A.C.	20	16	36

- Date: October 5, 1895
- Location: Exposition Park, Pittsburgh
- Game attendance: 550
- Referee: O. D. Thompson

On October 5, the first game pitted the WUP against the Duquesne Country and Athletic Club at Exposition Park. The WUP players were outweighed and outclassed against one of the best club teams in the Pittsburgh area. Five different players scored touchdowns for the Duquesnes. The A.C. made numerous substitutions for the second half. John Rugh replaced Cohen at left guard for the WUP eleven. The second half highlight was an 85-yard kickoff return by Floyd Rose (former WUP quarterback). The final score read 36–0.

The WUP starting lineup for the season opener was William Bigger (left end), George Neale (left tackle), Cohen (left guard), Charles Burheim (center), Smith (right guard), Morris Gelb (right tackle), Al Marshall (right end), Kittner (quarterback), J.P. Linn (left halfback), Edward Mayer (right halfback) and James Frazier (fullback).

=== At Greensburg Athletic Association ===
On October 12, the Greensburg Athletic Association ran roughshod over the WUP eleven in Greensburg. The game featured arguments with officials about the rules and accusations of stealing signals. The WUP captain requested that umpire Jamison of Greensburg be replaced with Boswell of the WUP. The home team objected and their Captain Atherton assaulted Mr. Boswell. Injuries to Neale and Marshall of the Western U. did not help matters. The WUP could only manage a safety and lost the game: 40–2 according to The Pittsburgh Post, 24-2 according to The Pittsburgh Press, and 42–2 according to the Coffin Corner.

The WUP lineup for the Greensburg game was Ned Johnston (left end), George Neale (left tackle), Cohen (left guard), Young (center), Smith (right guard), John Rugh (right tackle), Davis (right end), James Frazier (quarterback), Al Marshall (right halfback), Edward Mayer (left halfback) and Thomas (fullback). The attendance was about three hundred and the referee was Hargrave.

=== At Emerald Athletic Club ===
On October 19, the first game under the tutelage of J.P. Linn was against the Emerald Athletic Club at Emerald Park. This was Emerald's first game and they were coached by WUP halfback George Neale. The WUP eleven showed marked improvement over their previous games and secured a victory by the score of 22–0. More than two thousand fans witnessed the game refereed by McNeill, that was well played and free from arguments and fisticuffs.

The WUP lineup for the Emerald game was William Bigger (right end), John Scott (right tackle), Cohen (right guard), Young (center), Charles Burheim (left guard), Murray (left tackle), Morris Gelb (left end), James Frazier (quarterback), Thomas (right halfback), George Neale (left halfback) and Charles Rankin (fullback).

=== At West Virginia ===
WUP at West Virginia

Team	1	2	Total
WUP	0	0	0
• West Virginia	6	0	6

- Date: October 26, 1895
- Location: College Grounds, Morgantown, WV

The first game of the Backyard Brawl took place October 26, 1895 in Morgantown, West Virginia. Since the Western boys had to catch a train home, the game was composed of 25-minute halves. The game was hotly contested and not without disputes. Keely of West Virginia scored a touchdown twelve minutes into the game but the goal kick after was missed by Leps. Later in the first half, Rugh of the Universities caught a bad punt by Rankin behind the goal. West Virginia argued that they should get credit for a touchdown. The WUP eleven argued it was a touchback. According to the Wheeling Daily Intelligencer reporter - "after some heated discussion, both teams agreed that a safety would be called instead of a touchdown for the Mountaineers." That made the score at halftime 6–0 in favor of the Mountaineers. The second half was scoreless. Then, The Wheeling Daily Intelligencer published the score as 10–0. The Pittsburgh papers have it as 6–0. The Pitt Media Guide lists the score as 8-0. The Western University Courant article written by Ned Johnston, who was on the field, stated both teams agreed to keep the score 4-0 and that the argument was settled as a touchback. He also expressed disappointment in the boorish behavior of the "semi-civilized" Mountaineer fans and the six hour train ride to get to and from Morgantown. A heated rivalry was born.

The WUP starting lineup for the first West Virginia game was Charles Burheim (center), John Rugh (left guard), Cohen (left guard), Morris Gelb (right tackle), Murray (left tackle), Thomas (right halfback), George Neale (left halfback), Al Marshall (right end), J. P. Linn (left end), James Frazier (quarterback) and Charles Rankin (fullback).

=== At Washington & Jefferson ===
WUP at W. & J.

Team	1	2	Total
WUP	0	0	0
• W. & J.	10	18	28

- Date: November 2, 1895
- Location: College Park, Washington, PA
- Referee: Mr. Frost

On November 2, the WUP squad traveled to Washington, Pennsylvania to take on Washington & Jefferson. The WUP eleven was outweighed and unable to stop the rushes of the Washington & Jefferson backfield. Frye and Fiscus scored for Washington & Jefferson in the first half and the score stood 10–0 at halftime. In the second half Washington & Jefferson continued to run through the WUP defense, as Brownlee, Fiscus, Frye and Ely each scored a touchdown. The final score read 28–0. The Pittsburg Post summed it up best: "The W.U.P. played a clean, fast game but could do nothing with the W. &. J. line."

The WUP lineup for the W. & J. game was Al Marshall (left end), Smith (left tackle), Young (left guard), Charles Burheim (center), Cohen (right guard), John Rugh (right tackle), Montgomery (right end), James Frazier (quarterback), Davis (right halfback), Thomas (left halfback), and George Neale (fullback).

=== At Carnegie Athletic Club ===
WUP at Carnegie A.C.

Team	1	2	Total
WUP	6	0	6
• Carnegie A.C.	10	0	10

- Date: November 16, 1895
- Location: Carnegie Club Grounds, Braddock, PA
- Game attendance: 1,500

On November 16, the WUP eleven took on the Carnegie Athletic Club in Braddock, Pennsylvania. The Western University played their best game of the season but came up short on the scoreboard. In front of 1500 fans, WUP quarterback Frazier received the opening kick and ran it back for a touchdown. He followed that with the goal kick after and WUP was ahead 6–0 one minute into the game. The University boys did not score again. Carnegie was able to score two touchdowns and a goal kick after against the WUP defense. The final score read 10–6 in favor of Carnegie.

The WUP lineup for the Carnegie A.C. game was Al Marshall (left end), Morris Gelb (left tackle), Cohen (left guard), Charles Burheim (center), John Rugh (right guard), Murray (right tackle), Ned Johnston (right end), James Frazier (quarterback), George Neale (right halfback), Thomas (left halfback), and J.P. Linn (fullback).

=== At Wheeling Tigers ===
WUP at Wheeling Tigers

Team	1	2	Total
WUP	0	0	0
• Wheeling Tigers	6	6	12

- Date: November 28, 1895
- Location: State Fairgrounds, Wheeling, West Virginia
- Game attendance: 2,500

On Thanksgiving Day, the Wheeling Tigers hosted the WUP's final game of the 1895 season at the State Fairgrounds in Wheeling, West Virginia. The WUP defense played well in the first half and held the Tigers to a late touchdown by John Edwards. Robert Edwards kicked the goal after. Early in the second half the Wheeling offense advanced the ball deep into WUP territory. Cal McAninch finally scored from the three yard line. Robert Edwards kicked the goal after and the Tigers were ahead 12–0. The WUP offense was able to move the ball into Tiger territory on several possessions but the Tiger defense would stiffen and get the ball back on downs. The Tigers were again close to scoring as time ran out. The 2,500 spectators were treated to a good turkey day football game.

The WUP lineup for the Wheeling game was Al Marshall (left end), Hall (left tackle), Cohen (left guard), Young (center), John Rugh (right guard), Morris Gelb (right tackle), Ned Johnston (right end), James Frazier (quarterback), George Neale (left halfback), J.P. Linn (right halfback), and Charles Rankin (fullback).

== Roster ==
The roster of the 1895 Western University of Pennsylvania football team:

- Dr. William M. Bigger (left end) previously played football at Westminster College. He received his Doctor of Medicine degree in 1897.
- George Neale (left tackle) received his Associate degree from the college in 1895 and lived in Pittsburgh.
- Dr. Charles Burheim (center) received his Doctor of Medicine degree in 1899.
- Dr. Morris J. Gelb (right tackle) earned his Doctor of Medicine degree in 1897 and lived in Pittsburgh.
- Al Marshall (right end/team captain) received his Bachelor of Philosophy degree in 1894.
- Dr. Edward Mayer (right halfback) was captain. He received his Bachelor of Arts degree in 1895, his Doctor of Medicine degree in 1897 and his Masters of Arts degree in 1899. He lived in Pittsburgh.
- C. H. Frazier (fullback)
- Edwin "Ned" Johnston (left end) earned his Mechanical Engineering degree in 1897 and lived in Canonsburg, Pennsylvania.
- Dr. John B. Rugh (right tackle) earned his Doctor of Medicine degree in 1897 and lived in Pitcairn, Pennsylvania.
- Dr. Charles Rankin (fullback) earned his Doctor of Medicine degree in 1896 and lived in McKeesport, Pennsylvania.
- Dr. Joseph K. Scott (right tackle) received his Doctor of Dental Surgery degree in 1899 and lived in Pittsburgh.
- Montgomery (left end) class of 1898
- Murray (left tackle) class of 1898
- Hall (left tackle)
- Cohen (left guard)
- Smith (right guard)
- Kittner (quarterback)
- Young (center)
- Davis (right end)
- Thomas (fullback)

== Coaching staff ==
- W. A. Stuart, a former Penn State fullback, was hired by the Athletic Committee but only lasted through two games before he was dismissed.
- J. P. Linn a former Washington & Jefferson halfback was hired and finished the season before departing to Seminary School.
