= 1895 Boston College football team =

American college football season

1895 Boston College football
- Conference: Independent
- Record: 2–4–2
- Head coach: Joseph Lawless (1st season)
- Captain: John A. Brewin
- Home stadium: South End Grounds

1895 Eastern college football independents records
| | Conf. | | | Overall |
| Team | W | L | T | W | | L | | T |
|---|---|---|---|---|---|---|---|---|
| Penn | | – | | 14 | – | 0 | – | 0 |
| Yale | | – | | 13 | – | 0 | – | 2 |
| Princeton | | – | | 10 | – | 1 | – | 1 |
| Washington & Jefferson | | – | | 6 | – | 1 | – | 1 |
| Harvard | | – | | 8 | – | 2 | – | 1 |
| Lafayette | | – | | 6 | – | 2 | – | 0 |
| Syracuse | | – | | 6 | – | 2 | – | 2 |
| Army | | – | | 5 | – | 2 | – | 0 |
| Bucknell | | – | | 5 | – | 2 | – | 0 |
| Colgate | | – | | 4 | – | 2 | – | 0 |
| Swarthmore | | – | | 7 | – | 4 | – | 1 |
| Tufts | | – | | 8 | – | 5 | – | 0 |
| Villanova | | – | | 4 | – | 2 | – | 0 |
| Wesleyan | | – | | 6 | – | 3 | – | 0 |
| Amherst | | – | | 6 | – | 5 | – | 0 |
| Brown | | – | | 7 | – | 6 | – | 1 |
| Carlisle | | – | | 4 | – | 4 | – | 0 |
| Drexel | | – | | 3 | – | 3 | – | 1 |
| Rhode Island | | – | | 1 | – | 1 | – | 0 |
| Penn State | | – | | 2 | – | 2 | – | 3 |
| Cornell | | – | | 3 | – | 4 | – | 1 |
| Rutgers | | – | | 3 | – | 4 | – | 0 |
| New Hampshire | | – | | 2 | – | 3 | – | 1 |
| Franklin & Marshall | | – | | 3 | – | 5 | – | 1 |
| Boston College | | – | | 2 | – | 4 | – | 2 |
| Lehigh | | – | | 3 | – | 6 | – | 0 |
| CCNY | | – | | 2 | – | 5 | – | 1 |
| Buffalo | | – | | 1 | – | 4 | – | 2 |
| Temple | | – | | 1 | – | 4 | – | 1 |
| MIT | | – | | 1 | – | 4 | – | 0 |
| Trinity (CT) | | – | | 1 | – | 4 | – | 0 |
| Massachusetts | | – | | 1 | – | 5 | – | 0 |
| Western Univ. Penn. | | – | | 1 | – | 6 | – | 0 |
| Geneva | | – | | 0 | – | 5 | – | 0 |
| NYU | | – | | 0 | – | 5 | – | 0 |

The 1895 Boston College football team was an American football team that represented Boston College as an independent during the 1895 college football season. Led by Joseph Lawless in his first and only season as head coach, Boston College compiled a record of 2–4–2.

== Schedule ==
| Date | Opponent | Site | Result | Attendance | Source |
|---|---|---|---|---|---|
| October 2 | at Andover Academy | Andover, MA | L 0–22 | | |
| October 5 | at Campello Athletic Club | | L 10–28 | | |
| October 9 | at Tufts | College Hill athletic grounds; Medford, MA | L 0–28 | 300 | |
| October 26 | at Hyde Park Athletic Association | Stony Brook Grounds; Boston, MA | T 6–6 | | |
| November 2 | at Whitman Athletic Club | Whitman, MA | T 0–0 | | |
| November 9 | at Fitchburg Athletic Club | Fitchburg, MA | W 6–0 | | |
| November 23 | at Marlboro Athletic Club | Marlborough, MA | W 14–0 | | |
| November 28 | Boston University | South End Grounds; Boston, MA (rivalry) | L 0–22 | 4,000 | |
