= 1895 Rutgers Queensmen football team =

American college football season

1895 Rutgers Queensmen football
- Conference: Independent
- Record: 3–4
- Head coach: William Ayres Reynolds (1st season; first 2 games); H. W. Ambruster (final 5 games)
- Captain: William A. Ranney
- Home stadium: Neilson Field

1895 Eastern college football independents records
	Conf.			Overall
Team	W	L	T	W		L		T
Penn		–		14	–	0	–	0
Yale		–		13	–	0	–	2
Princeton		–		10	–	1	–	1
Washington & Jefferson		–		6	–	1	–	1
Harvard		–		8	–	2	–	1
Lafayette		–		6	–	2	–	0
Syracuse		–		6	–	2	–	2
Army		–		5	–	2	–	0
Bucknell		–		5	–	2	–	0
Colgate		–		4	–	2	–	0
Swarthmore		–		7	–	4	–	1
Tufts		–		8	–	5	–	0
Villanova		–		4	–	2	–	0
Wesleyan		–		6	–	3	–	0
Amherst		–		6	–	5	–	0
Brown		–		7	–	6	–	1
Carlisle		–		4	–	4	–	0
Drexel		–		3	–	3	–	1
Rhode Island		–		1	–	1	–	0
Penn State		–		2	–	2	–	3
Cornell		–		3	–	4	–	1
Rutgers		–		3	–	4	–	0
New Hampshire		–		2	–	3	–	1
Franklin & Marshall		–		3	–	5	–	1
Boston College		–		2	–	4	–	2
Lehigh		–		3	–	6	–	0
CCNY		–		2	–	5	–	1
Buffalo		–		1	–	4	–	2
Temple		–		1	–	4	–	1
MIT		–		1	–	4	–	0
Trinity (CT)		–		1	–	4	–	0
Massachusetts		–		1	–	5	–	0
Western Univ. Penn.		–		1	–	6	–	0
Geneva		–		0	–	5	–	0
NYU		–		0	–	5	–	0

The 1895 Rutgers Queensmen football team represented Rutgers University as an independent during the 1895 college football season. William Ayres Reynolds coached the first two games, losing both. When Reynolds left to coach the Sewanee team, Rutgers completed their season under head coach H. W. Ambruster. The Queensmen compiled an overall 3–4 record and were outscored by their opponents, 131 to 98. The team captain was William A. Ranney.

== Schedule ==
Date	Time	Opponent	Site	Result	Attendance	Source
September 28		at Lehigh	Bethlehem, PA	L 0–25		
October 5		at Princeton	University Field; Princeton, NJ (rivalry)	L 0–22		
October 19	4:00 p.m.	Roseville Athletic Club	Neilson Field; New Brunswick, NJ	W 38–4		
October 23	3:30 p.m.	Swarthmore	Neilson Field; New Brunswick, NJ	W 26–12		
October 26		NYU	Neilson Field; New Brunswick, NJ	W 16–0		
October 30		at Lafayette	March Field; Easton, PA	L 0–52	500	
November 9		at Elizabeth Athletic Club	Elizabeth, NJ	L 6–14		
