= 1895 Bucknell football team =

American college football season

1895 Bucknell football
- Conference: Independent
- Record: 5–2
- Head coach: Will Young (3rd season)
- Captain: William Bunnell

1895 Eastern college football independents records
	Conf.			Overall
Team	W	L	T	W		L		T
Penn		–		14	–	0	–	0
Yale		–		13	–	0	–	2
Princeton		–		10	–	1	–	1
Washington & Jefferson		–		6	–	1	–	1
Harvard		–		8	–	2	–	1
Lafayette		–		6	–	2	–	0
Syracuse		–		6	–	2	–	2
Army		–		5	–	2	–	0
Bucknell		–		5	–	2	–	0
Colgate		–		4	–	2	–	0
Swarthmore		–		7	–	4	–	1
Tufts		–		8	–	5	–	0
Villanova		–		4	–	2	–	0
Wesleyan		–		6	–	3	–	0
Amherst		–		6	–	5	–	0
Brown		–		7	–	6	–	1
Carlisle		–		4	–	4	–	0
Drexel		–		3	–	3	–	1
Rhode Island		–		1	–	1	–	0
Penn State		–		2	–	2	–	3
Cornell		–		3	–	4	–	1
Rutgers		–		3	–	4	–	0
New Hampshire		–		2	–	3	–	1
Franklin & Marshall		–		3	–	5	–	1
Boston College		–		2	–	4	–	2
Lehigh		–		3	–	6	–	0
CCNY		–		2	–	5	–	1
Buffalo		–		1	–	4	–	2
Temple		–		1	–	4	–	1
MIT		–		1	–	4	–	0
Trinity (CT)		–		1	–	4	–	0
Massachusetts		–		1	–	5	–	0
Western Univ. Penn.		–		1	–	6	–	0
Geneva		–		0	–	5	–	0
NYU		–		0	–	5	–	0

The 1895 Bucknell football team was an American football team that represented Bucknell University as an independent during the 1895 college football season. Led by third-year head coach Will Young, Bucknell compiled a record of 5–2. William Bunnell was the team captain.

== Schedule ==
Date	Time	Opponent	Site	Result	Attendance	Source
October 2	3:30 p.m.	at Penn	Franklin Field; Philadelphia, PA	L 0–40		
October 9	3:30 p.m.	Franklin & Marshall	Bucknell campus; Lewisburg, PA	W 24–0		
October 12	2:30 p.m.	Wyoming Seminary	Bucknell campus; Lewisburg, PA	W 24–0		
October 19	2:45 p.m.	vs. Gettysburg	Sixth Street grounds; Harrisburg, PA	W 50–0	900	
October 26		vs. Penn State	Williamsport, PA	L 0–16	4,000–5,000	
November 16	2:30 p.m.	Carlisle	Bucknell campus; Lewisburg, PA	W 18–4		
November 28	2:50 p.m.	vs. Dickinson	Sunbury, PA	W 28–0		
