= 1895 Penn State football team =

American college football season

1895 Penn State football
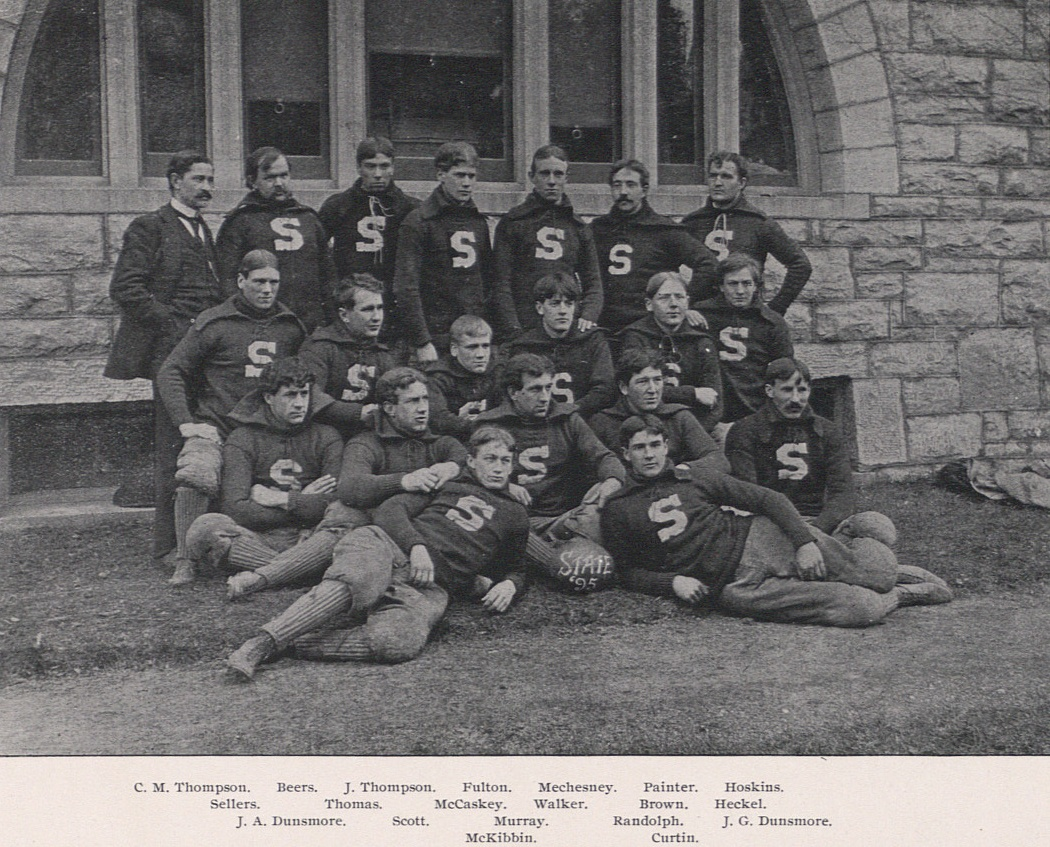
- Conference: Independent
- Record: 2–2–3
- Head coach: George W. Hoskins (4th season)
- Captain: Walter McCaskey
- Home stadium: Beaver Field

1895 Eastern college football independents records
	Conf.			Overall
Team	W	L	T	W		L		T
Penn		–		14	–	0	–	0
Yale		–		13	–	0	–	2
Princeton		–		10	–	1	–	1
Washington & Jefferson		–		6	–	1	–	1
Harvard		–		8	–	2	–	1
Lafayette		–		6	–	2	–	0
Syracuse		–		6	–	2	–	2
Army		–		5	–	2	–	0
Bucknell		–		5	–	2	–	0
Colgate		–		4	–	2	–	0
Swarthmore		–		7	–	4	–	1
Tufts		–		8	–	5	–	0
Villanova		–		4	–	2	–	0
Wesleyan		–		6	–	3	–	0
Brown		–		7	–	6	–	1
Carlisle		–		4	–	4	–	0
Drexel		–		3	–	3	–	1
Rhode Island		–		1	–	1	–	0
Penn State		–		2	–	2	–	3
Cornell		–		3	–	4	–	1
Rutgers		–		3	–	4	–	0
New Hampshire		–		2	–	3	–	1
Franklin & Marshall		–		3	–	5	–	1
Boston College		–		2	–	4	–	2
Lehigh		–		3	–	6	–	0
CCNY		–		2	–	5	–	1
Buffalo		–		1	–	4	–	2
Temple		–		1	–	4	–	1
MIT		–		1	–	4	–	0
Trinity (CT)		–		1	–	4	–	0
Massachusetts		–		1	–	5	–	0
Western Univ. Penn.		–		1	–	6	–	0
Geneva		–		0	–	5	–	0
NYU		–		0	–	5	–	0

The 1895 Penn State football team was an American football team that represented Pennsylvania State College—now known as Pennsylvania State University–as an independent during the 1895 college football season. The team was coached by George W. Hoskins and played its home games on Beaver Field in University Park, Pennsylvania.

== Schedule ==
Date	Opponent	Site	Result	Attendance	Source
September 25	Gettysburg	Beaver Field; State College, PA	W 20–6		
October 5	at Cornell	Percy Field; Ithaca, NY	T 0–0	1,000	
October 26	vs. Bucknell	Williamsport, PA	W 16–0	4,000–5,000	
November 9	at Penn	Franklin Field; Philadelphia, PA	L 4–35	5,000	
November 16	at Pittsburgh Athletic Club	Pittsburgh, PA	L 10–11	2,000	
November 18	at Washington & Jefferson	College Field; Washington, PA	T 6–6		
November 28	at Western Reserve	Cleveland, OH	T 8–8		
