= George O. Redington =

American football player, coach, and lawyer (1871–1958)

Biographical details
- Born: April 30, 1871; Syracuse, New York, U.S.
- Died: April 17, 1958 (aged 86); Danbury, Connecticut, U.S.

Playing career
- 1891: Syracuse

Coaching career (HC unless noted)
- 1895–1896: Syracuse

Head coaching record
- Overall: 11–5–4

George Owen Redington (April 30, 1871 – April 17, 1958) was an American college football player, coach, and lawyer He served as the head football coach at Syracuse University from 1895 to 1896, compiling a record of 11–5–4. Redington graduated from Yale Law School in 1895 and joined the law firm of Carter, Hughes & Dwight in New York, where he worked under Charles Evans Hughes. He served as assistant corporation counsel of New York during the administration of Fiorello H. La Guardia, Mayor of New York City. Redington was a veteran of the Spanish–American War. He died at Danbury Hospital in Danbury, Connecticut on April 17, 1958.

== Head coaching record ==
Year	Team	Overall	Conference	Standing	Bowl/playoffs
Syracuse Orangemen (Independent) (1895–1896)
1895	Syracuse	6–2–2			
1896	Syracuse	5–3–2			
Syracuse:		11–5–4			
Total:		11–5–4			
