= 1895 Brown Bears football team =

American college football season

1895 Brown Bears football
- Conference: Independent
- Record: 7–6–1
- Head coach: Wallace Moyle (1st season)
- Captain: C. P. Nott
- Home stadium: Lincoln Field, Adelaide Park

1895 Eastern college football independents records
	Conf.			Overall
Team	W	L	T	W		L		T
Penn		–		14	–	0	–	0
Yale		–		13	–	0	–	2
Princeton		–		10	–	1	–	1
Washington & Jefferson		–		6	–	1	–	1
Harvard		–		8	–	2	–	1
Lafayette		–		6	–	2	–	0
Syracuse		–		6	–	2	–	2
Army		–		5	–	2	–	0
Bucknell		–		5	–	2	–	0
Colgate		–		4	–	2	–	0
Swarthmore		–		7	–	4	–	1
Tufts		–		8	–	5	–	0
Villanova		–		4	–	2	–	0
Wesleyan		–		6	–	3	–	0
Amherst		–		6	–	5	–	0
Brown		–		7	–	6	–	1
Carlisle		–		4	–	4	–	0
Drexel		–		3	–	3	–	1
Rhode Island		–		1	–	1	–	0
Penn State		–		2	–	2	–	3
Cornell		–		3	–	4	–	1
Rutgers		–		3	–	4	–	0
New Hampshire		–		2	–	3	–	1
Franklin & Marshall		–		3	–	5	–	1
Boston College		–		2	–	4	–	2
Lehigh		–		3	–	6	–	0
CCNY		–		2	–	5	–	1
Buffalo		–		1	–	4	–	2
Temple		–		1	–	4	–	1
MIT		–		1	–	4	–	0
Trinity (CT)		–		1	–	4	–	0
Massachusetts		–		1	–	5	–	0
Western Univ. Penn.		–		1	–	6	–	0
Geneva		–		0	–	5	–	0
NYU		–		0	–	5	–	0

The 1895 Brown Bears football team represented Brown University as an independent during the 1895 college football season. Led by first-year head coach Wallace Moyle, Brown compiled a record of 7–6–1.

== Schedule ==
Date	Time	Opponent	Site	Result	Attendance	Source
September 28		Newton Athletic Association	Lincoln Field; Providence, RI	W 22–0		
October 2		at Yale	Yale Field; New Haven, CT	L 0–4		
October 12		Tufts	Lincoln Field; Providence, RI	W 28–0	400	
October 19		at Harvard	Soldiers' Field; Boston, MA	L 6–26	5,000	
October 23		at MIT	South End Grounds; Boston, MA	W 14–0	400	
October 26		Lehigh	Lincoln Field; Providence, RI	W 22–4	1,500	
October 30		at Penn	Franklin Field; Philadelphia, PA	L 0–12		
November 5	3:20 p.m.	at Crescent Athletic Club	Eastern Park; Brooklyn, NY	L 0–16		
November 6		Wesleyan	Lincoln Field; Providence, RI	W 10–5		
November 9		Yale	Adelaide Park; Providence, RI	T 6–6	3,000	
November 13		MIT	Lincoln Field; Providence, RI	W 28–0	1,000	
November 16	3:20 p.m.	at Cornell	Percy Field; Ithaca, NY	L 4–6		
November 23		at Army	The Plain; West Point, NY	L 0–26		
November 28		Dartmouth	Adelaide Park; Providence, RI	W 10–4	6,000	
