= 1895 Penn Quakers football team =

American college football season

1895 Penn Quakers football
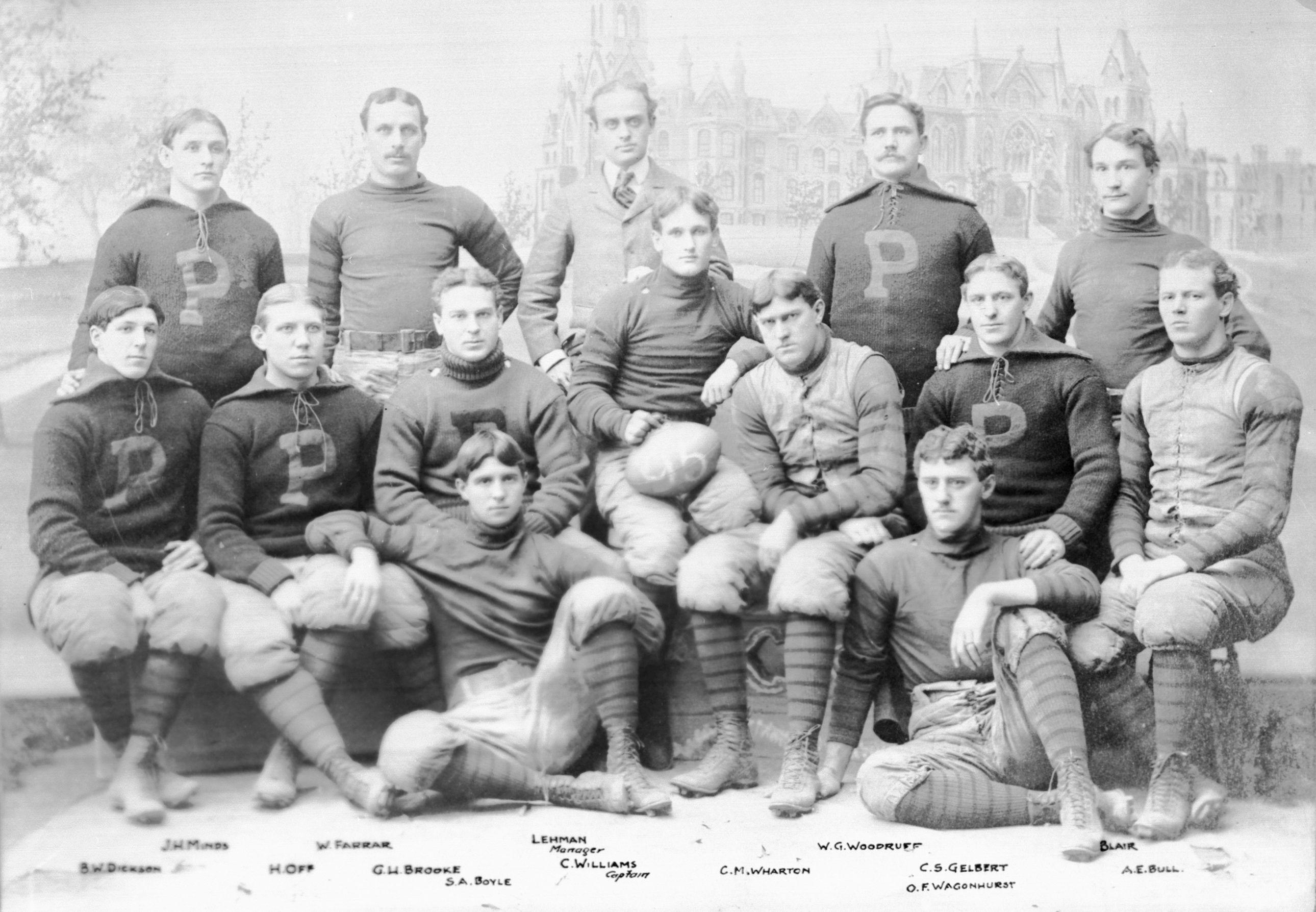

National champion (Billingsley, Helms, Houlgate, NCF) Co-national champion (Davis)
- Conference: Independent
- Record: 14–0
- Head coach: George Washington Woodruff (4th season)
- Captain: Carl S. Williams
- Home stadium: Franklin Field

1895 Eastern college football independents records
	Conf.			Overall
Team	W	L	T	W		L		T
Penn		–		14	–	0	–	0
Yale		–		13	–	0	–	2
Princeton		–		10	–	1	–	1
Washington & Jefferson		–		6	–	1	–	1
Harvard		–		8	–	2	–	1
Lafayette		–		6	–	2	–	0
Syracuse		–		6	–	2	–	2
Army		–		5	–	2	–	0
Bucknell		–		5	–	2	–	0
Colgate		–		4	–	2	–	0
Swarthmore		–		7	–	4	–	1
Tufts		–		8	–	5	–	0
Villanova		–		4	–	2	–	0
Wesleyan		–		6	–	3	–	0
Amherst		–		6	–	5	–	0
Brown		–		7	–	6	–	1
Carlisle		–		4	–	4	–	0
Drexel		–		3	–	3	–	1
Rhode Island		–		1	–	1	–	0
Penn State		–		2	–	2	–	3
Cornell		–		3	–	4	–	1
Rutgers		–		3	–	4	–	0
New Hampshire		–		2	–	3	–	1
Franklin & Marshall		–		3	–	5	–	1
Boston College		–		2	–	4	–	2
Lehigh		–		3	–	6	–	0
CCNY		–		2	–	5	–	1
Buffalo		–		1	–	4	–	2
Temple		–		1	–	4	–	1
MIT		–		1	–	4	–	0
Trinity (CT)		–		1	–	4	–	0
Massachusetts		–		1	–	5	–	0
Western Univ. Penn.		–		1	–	6	–	0
Geneva		–		0	–	5	–	0
NYU		–		0	–	5	–	0

The 1895 Penn Quakers football team was an American football team that represented the University of Pennsylvania as an independent during the 1895 college football season. In their fourth season under head coach George Washington Woodruff, the Quakers compiled a 14–0 record, shut out 10 of 14 opponents, and outscored all opponents by a total of 480 to 24.

There was no contemporaneous system in 1895 for determining a national champion. However, Penn was retroactively named as the national champion by the Billingsley Report, Helms Athletic Foundation, Houlgate System, and National Championship Foundation, and as a co-national champion by Parke H. Davis.

Four Penn players were consensus first-team selections on the 1895 All-American football team: halfback George H. Brooke; center Alfred E. Bull; end Charlie Gelbert; and guard Charles Wharton. Brooke, Gelbert, and Wharton were later inducted into the College Football Hall of Fame.

== Schedule ==
Date	Time	Opponent	Site	Result	Attendance	Source
October 1		Swarthmore	Franklin Field; Philadelphia, PA	W 40–0	1,500–2,000	
October 2	3:30 p.m.	Bucknell	Franklin Field; Philadelphia, PA	W 40–0		
October 5		Franklin & Marshall	Franklin Field; Philadelphia, PA	W 42–0		
October 9		at Crescent Athletic Club	Eastern Park; Brooklyn, NY	W 32–0	< 500	
October 14		Lehigh	Franklin Field; Philadelphia, PA	W 54–0		
October 16		Carlisle	Franklin Field; Philadelphia, PA	W 36–0		
October 19		Virginia	Franklin Field; Philadelphia, PA	W 54–0	1,500	
October 23		at Duquesne Country and Athletic Club	Exposition Park; Pittsburgh, PA	W 30–0	4,000	
October 26		Lafayette	Franklin Field; Philadelphia, PA	W 30–0	8,500	
October 30		Brown	Franklin Field; Philadelphia, PA	W 12–0		
November 1		Chicago Athletic Association	Franklin Field; Philadelphia, PA	W 12–4		
November 9		Penn State	Franklin Field; Philadelphia, PA	W 35–4	5,000	
November 23		at Harvard	Soldiers Field; Cambridge, MA (rivalry)	W 17–14		
November 28		Cornell	Franklin Field; Philadelphia, PA (rivalry)	W 46–2	20,000	
