= 1895 Swarthmore Quakers football team =

American college football season

1895 Swarthmore Quakers football
- Conference: Independent
- Record: 7–4–1
- Head coach: Jacob K. Shell (8th season)
- Home stadium: Whittier Field

1895 Eastern college football independents records
	Conf.			Overall
Team	W	L	T	W		L		T
Penn		–		14	–	0	–	0
Yale		–		13	–	0	–	2
Princeton		–		10	–	1	–	1
Washington & Jefferson		–		6	–	1	–	1
Harvard		–		8	–	2	–	1
Lafayette		–		6	–	2	–	0
Syracuse		–		6	–	2	–	2
Army		–		5	–	2	–	0
Bucknell		–		5	–	2	–	0
Colgate		–		4	–	2	–	0
Swarthmore		–		7	–	4	–	1
Tufts		–		8	–	5	–	0
Villanova		–		4	–	2	–	0
Wesleyan		–		6	–	3	–	0
Amherst		–		6	–	5	–	0
Brown		–		7	–	6	–	1
Carlisle		–		4	–	4	–	0
Drexel		–		3	–	3	–	1
Rhode Island		–		1	–	1	–	0
Penn State		–		2	–	2	–	3
Cornell		–		3	–	4	–	1
Rutgers		–		3	–	4	–	0
New Hampshire		–		2	–	3	–	1
Franklin & Marshall		–		3	–	5	–	1
Boston College		–		2	–	4	–	2
Lehigh		–		3	–	6	–	0
CCNY		–		2	–	5	–	1
Buffalo		–		1	–	4	–	2
Temple		–		1	–	4	–	1
MIT		–		1	–	4	–	0
Trinity (CT)		–		1	–	4	–	0
Massachusetts		–		1	–	5	–	0
Western Univ. Penn.		–		1	–	6	–	0
Geneva		–		0	–	5	–	0
NYU		–		0	–	5	–	0

The 1895 Swarthmore Quakers football team was an American football team that represented Swarthmore College as an independent during the 1895 college football season. The team compiled a 7–4–1 record and was outscored by a total of 204 to 173. Jacob K. Shell was the head coach.

== Schedule ==
Date	Time	Opponent	Site	Result	Attendance	Source
October 1		at Penn	Franklin Field; Philadelphia, PA	L 0–40	1,500–2,000	
October 5		Delaware	Whittier Field; Swarthmore, PA	W 14–0		
October 16		Ursinus	Whittier Field; Swarthmore, PA	W 20–4		
October 19		Baltimore City College	Whittier Field; Swarthmore, PA	W 20–0		
October 23	3:30 p.m.	at Rutgers	Neilson Field; New Brunswick, NJ	L 12–26		
October 26		at Delaware	Newark, DE	W 31–12		
November 2		vs. Gettysburg	Harrisburg, PA	W 10–0		
November 9		Johns Hopkins	Whittier Field; Swarthmore, PA	W 28–14		
November 13		St. John's (MD)	Whittier Field; Swarthmore, PA	T 22–22		
November 16		Pennsylvania Military	Whittier Field; Swarthmore, PA	W 16–12		
November 23		at Haverford	Haverford, PA (rivalry)	L 0–24		
November 28		at Franklin & Marshall	Lancaster, PA	L 0–50		
