= 1895 Washington & Jefferson football team =

American college football season

1895 Washington & Jefferson football
- Conference: Independent
- Record: 6–1–1
- Head coach: E. Gard Edwards (2nd season)
- Captain: Tony Frye

1895 Eastern college football independents records
	Conf.			Overall
Team	W	L	T	W		L		T
Penn		–		14	–	0	–	0
Yale		–		13	–	0	–	2
Princeton		–		10	–	1	–	1
Washington & Jefferson		–		6	–	1	–	1
Harvard		–		8	–	2	–	1
Lafayette		–		6	–	2	–	0
Syracuse		–		6	–	2	–	2
Army		–		5	–	2	–	0
Bucknell		–		5	–	2	–	0
Colgate		–		4	–	2	–	0
Swarthmore		–		7	–	4	–	1
Tufts		–		8	–	5	–	0
Villanova		–		4	–	2	–	0
Wesleyan		–		6	–	3	–	0
Amherst		–		6	–	5	–	0
Brown		–		7	–	6	–	1
Carlisle		–		4	–	4	–	0
Drexel		–		3	–	3	–	1
Rhode Island		–		1	–	1	–	0
Penn State		–		2	–	2	–	3
Cornell		–		3	–	4	–	1
Rutgers		–		3	–	4	–	0
New Hampshire		–		2	–	3	–	1
Franklin & Marshall		–		3	–	5	–	1
Boston College		–		2	–	4	–	2
Lehigh		–		3	–	6	–	0
CCNY		–		2	–	5	–	1
Buffalo		–		1	–	4	–	2
Temple		–		1	–	4	–	1
MIT		–		1	–	4	–	0
Trinity (CT)		–		1	–	4	–	0
Massachusetts		–		1	–	5	–	0
Western Univ. Penn.		–		1	–	6	–	0
Geneva		–		0	–	5	–	0
NYU		–		0	–	5	–	0

The 1895 Washington & Jefferson football team was an American football team that represented Washington & Jefferson College as an independent during the 1895 college football season. Led by E. Gard Edwards in his second and final year as head coach, the team compiled a record of 6–1–1.

== Schedule ==
Date	Time	Opponent	Site	Result	Attendance	Source
September 28		Denison	Washington, PA	W 32–0		
October 5		Geneva	Washington, PA	W 14–0		
October 19	3:20 p.m.	at Pittsburgh Athletic Club	P. A. C. Park; Pittsburgh, PA	L 4–18	3,000	
October 26		Gettysburg	Washington, PA	W 42–0		
November 2		Western University of Pennsylvania	Washington, PA	W 28–0		
November 9		Kenyon	Washington, PA	W 8–0		
November 18		Penn State	Washington, PA	T 6–6		
November 23		vs. West Virginia	Wheeling, WV	W 4–0	1,000	
