= 1895 Harvard Crimson football team =

American college football season

1895 Harvard Crimson football
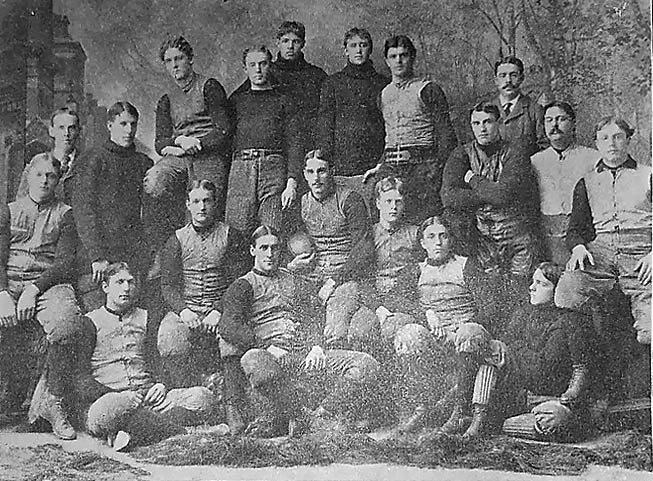
- Conference: Independent
- Record: 8–2–1
- Head coach: Robert Emmons (1st season; October 21 to November 3); Lorin F. Deland (November 3 to November 23)
- Home stadium: Soldiers' Field

1895 Eastern college football independents records
	Conf.			Overall
Team	W	L	T	W		L		T
Penn		–		14	–	0	–	0
Yale		–		13	–	0	–	2
Princeton		–		10	–	1	–	1
Washington & Jefferson		–		6	–	1	–	1
Harvard		–		8	–	2	–	1
Lafayette		–		6	–	2	–	0
Syracuse		–		6	–	2	–	2
Army		–		5	–	2	–	0
Bucknell		–		5	–	2	–	0
Colgate		–		4	–	2	–	0
Swarthmore		–		7	–	4	–	1
Tufts		–		8	–	5	–	0
Villanova		–		4	–	2	–	0
Wesleyan		–		6	–	3	–	0
Amherst		–		6	–	5	–	0
Brown		–		7	–	6	–	1
Carlisle		–		4	–	4	–	0
Drexel		–		3	–	3	–	1
Rhode Island		–		1	–	1	–	0
Penn State		–		2	–	2	–	3
Cornell		–		3	–	4	–	1
Rutgers		–		3	–	4	–	0
New Hampshire		–		2	–	3	–	1
Franklin & Marshall		–		3	–	5	–	1
Boston College		–		2	–	4	–	2
Lehigh		–		3	–	6	–	0
CCNY		–		2	–	5	–	1
Buffalo		–		1	–	4	–	2
Temple		–		1	–	4	–	1
MIT		–		1	–	4	–	0
Trinity (CT)		–		1	–	4	–	0
Massachusetts		–		1	–	5	–	0
Western Univ. Penn.		–		1	–	6	–	0
Geneva		–		0	–	5	–	0
NYU		–		0	–	5	–	0

The 1895 Harvard Crimson football team represented Harvard University in the 1895 college football season. The Crimson finished with an 8–2–1 record. First-year head coach Robert Emmons led the team from October 21 to November 3. Following the team's 12–4 loss to Princeton, assistant Lorin F. Deland took over as head coach. He led the team to a 1–1–1 record in their last three games, including a 17–14 loss to Penn, the closest the undefeated Quakers came to defeat that year.

== Schedule ==
Date	Time	Opponent	Site	Result	Attendance	Source
October 2		Dartmouth	Soldiers' Field; Boston, MA (rivalry)	W 4–0	3,000	
October 5	3:30 p.m.	Amherst	Soldiers' Field; Boston, MA	W 24–0	5,000	
October 9		Phillips Exeter	Soldiers' Field; Boston, MA	W 42–0		
October 12		at Army	The Plain; West Point, NY	W 4–0		
October 16	4:00 p.m,	Williams	Soldiers' Field; Boston, MA	W 32–0	1,000	
October 19		Brown	Soldiers' Field; Boston, MA	W 26–6	5,000	
October 26		Cornell	Soldiers' Field; Boston, MA	W 25–0		
November 2		at Princeton	University Field; Princeton, NJ (rivalry)	L 4–12		
November 9		Michigan	Soldiers' Field; Boston, MA	W 4–0	6,000	
November 16		Boston Athletic Association	Soldiers' Field; Boston, MA	T 0–0		
November 23		Penn	Soldiers' Field; Boston, MA (rivalry)	L 14–17		
