= L. Jay Caldwell =

American football player and coach (1871–1950)

Biographical details
- Born: June 19, 1871; Ephratah, New York, U.S.
- Died: 1950 (aged 78–79); Shrewsbury, Massachusetts, U.S.
- Education: Colgate University (1897); Harvard University

Playing career
- c. 1891–1896: Colgate

Coaching career (HC unless noted)
- 1893, 1895: Colgate

Head coaching record
- Overall: 7–2–2

L. Jay Caldwell (June 19, 1871 – 1950) was an American college football player and coach. He was the fourth head football coach at Colgate University and he held that position for two seasons, first in 1893 and then returning for 1895. His overall coaching record at Colgate was 7–2–2.

Caldwell was born in Ephratah, New York in 1871. He married May Thorne on July 20, 1904, in Jamaica, New York. Caldwell later taught mathematics at a high school in Amsterdam, New York. In 1913, he was teaching at an Orange, New Jersey high school. By the 1940 United States census, Caldwell and his wife were retired and living in Shrewsbury, Massachusetts. He died there in 1950.

== Racial integration ==
Caldwell coached the university's first African-American football player in 1895. No records were kept of the player's name, but a photograph (left) does exist.

== Head coaching record ==
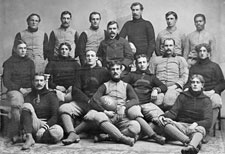
1895 Colgate football team

Year	Team	Overall	Conference	Standing	Bowl/playoffs
Colgate (Independent) (1893)
1893	Colgate	3–0–2			
Colgate (Independent) (1895)
1895	Colgate	4–2			
Colgate:		7–2–2			
Total:		7–2–2			
