= 1895 Villanova Wildcats football team =

American college football season

1895 Villanova Wildcats football
- Conference: Independent
- Record: 4–2
- Head coach: James A. McDonald (1st season)
- Captain: James A. McDonald

1895 Eastern college football independents records
| | Conf. | | | Overall |
| Team | W | L | T | W | | L | | T |
|---|---|---|---|---|---|---|---|---|
| Penn | | – | | 14 | – | 0 | – | 0 |
| Yale | | – | | 13 | – | 0 | – | 2 |
| Princeton | | – | | 10 | – | 1 | – | 1 |
| Washington & Jefferson | | – | | 6 | – | 1 | – | 1 |
| Harvard | | – | | 8 | – | 2 | – | 1 |
| Lafayette | | – | | 6 | – | 2 | – | 0 |
| Syracuse | | – | | 6 | – | 2 | – | 2 |
| Army | | – | | 5 | – | 2 | – | 0 |
| Bucknell | | – | | 5 | – | 2 | – | 0 |
| Colgate | | – | | 4 | – | 2 | – | 0 |
| Swarthmore | | – | | 7 | – | 4 | – | 1 |
| Tufts | | – | | 8 | – | 5 | – | 0 |
| Villanova | | – | | 4 | – | 2 | – | 0 |
| Wesleyan | | – | | 6 | – | 3 | – | 0 |
| Amherst | | – | | 6 | – | 5 | – | 0 |
| Brown | | – | | 7 | – | 6 | – | 1 |
| Carlisle | | – | | 4 | – | 4 | – | 0 |
| Drexel | | – | | 3 | – | 3 | – | 1 |
| Rhode Island | | – | | 1 | – | 1 | – | 0 |
| Penn State | | – | | 2 | – | 2 | – | 3 |
| Cornell | | – | | 3 | – | 4 | – | 1 |
| Rutgers | | – | | 3 | – | 4 | – | 0 |
| New Hampshire | | – | | 2 | – | 3 | – | 1 |
| Franklin & Marshall | | – | | 3 | – | 5 | – | 1 |
| Boston College | | – | | 2 | – | 4 | – | 2 |
| Lehigh | | – | | 3 | – | 6 | – | 0 |
| CCNY | | – | | 2 | – | 5 | – | 1 |
| Buffalo | | – | | 1 | – | 4 | – | 2 |
| Temple | | – | | 1 | – | 4 | – | 1 |
| MIT | | – | | 1 | – | 4 | – | 0 |
| Trinity (CT) | | – | | 1 | – | 4 | – | 0 |
| Massachusetts | | – | | 1 | – | 5 | – | 0 |
| Western Univ. Penn. | | – | | 1 | – | 6 | – | 0 |
| Geneva | | – | | 0 | – | 5 | – | 0 |
| NYU | | – | | 0 | – | 5 | – | 0 |

The 1895 Villanova Wildcats football team represented Villanova University during the 1895 college football season. The team's captain was James A. McDonald.

== Schedule ==
| Date | Opponent | Site | Result | Attendance | Source |
|---|---|---|---|---|---|
| October 22 | Philadelphia Manual Training School | Villanova, PA | W 12–6 | | |
| October 26 | South End Wheelmen | Villanova, PA | W 14–0 | 900 | |
| November 13 | Hahnemann Medical College | Villanova, PA | W 12–0 | | |
| November 16 | Philadelphia Dental College | Villanova, PA | W 10–0 | | |
| November 23 | Delaware | Villanova, PA (rivalry) | L 6–10 | | |
| November 28 | at West Chester | West Chester, PA | L 6–24 | | |
