= 1895 Syracuse Orangemen football team =

American college football season

1895 Syracuse Orangemen football
- Conference: Independent
- Record: 6–2–2
- Head coach: George O. Redington (1st season)
- Captain: Robert Adams
- Home stadium: Old Oval

1895 Eastern college football independents records
	Conf.			Overall
Team	W	L	T	W		L		T
Penn		–		14	–	0	–	0
Yale		–		13	–	0	–	2
Princeton		–		10	–	1	–	1
Washington & Jefferson		–		6	–	1	–	1
Harvard		–		8	–	2	–	1
Lafayette		–		6	–	2	–	0
Syracuse		–		6	–	2	–	2
Army		–		5	–	2	–	0
Bucknell		–		5	–	2	–	0
Colgate		–		4	–	2	–	0
Swarthmore		–		7	–	4	–	1
Tufts		–		8	–	5	–	0
Villanova		–		4	–	2	–	0
Wesleyan		–		6	–	3	–	0
Brown		–		7	–	6	–	1
Carlisle		–		4	–	4	–	0
Drexel		–		3	–	3	–	1
Rhode Island		–		1	–	1	–	0
Penn State		–		2	–	2	–	3
Cornell		–		3	–	4	–	1
Rutgers		–		3	–	4	–	0
New Hampshire		–		2	–	3	–	1
Franklin & Marshall		–		3	–	5	–	1
Boston College		–		2	–	4	–	2
Lehigh		–		3	–	6	–	0
CCNY		–		2	–	5	–	1
Buffalo		–		1	–	4	–	2
Temple		–		1	–	4	–	1
MIT		–		1	–	4	–	0
Trinity (CT)		–		1	–	4	–	0
Massachusetts		–		1	–	5	–	0
Western Univ. Penn.		–		1	–	6	–	0
Geneva		–		0	–	5	–	0
NYU		–		0	–	5	–	0

The 1895 Syracuse Orangemen football team represented Syracuse University as an independent during the 1895 college football season. The head coach was George O. Redington, coaching his first season with the Orangemen.

The Orange had a their first real home field in the Oval, as it was known then. The field, located behind the Hall of Languages, was available for students since the 1880s, but most team sports were played in the Star Park. With deliberate effort to make the Oval the center of SU athletics, the university formally opened the Oval as the new athletic field on June 8, 1895.

This was the first year when the Orange recorded a victory against rival Colgate, winning by the score of 4–0.

== Schedule ==
Date	Opponent	Site	Result	Attendance	Source
September 26	at Cornell	Ithaca, NY	L 0–8		
October 5	at Scranton Athletic Association	Scranton, PA	W 12–0		
October 10	Syracuse Athletic Association	Syracuse, NY	W 24–0		
October 19	at Williams	Weston Field; Williamstown, MA	L 10–28	600	
October 26	St. John's Military Academy	Syracuse, NY	T 6–6		
November 2	Hobart	Syracuse, NY	W 46–0		
November 9	Colgate	Syracuse, NY (rivalry)	W 4–0		
November 13	at Syracuse Athletic Association	Syracuse, NY	W 18–0		
November 16	Rochester	Syracuse, NY	W 30–0		
November 23	at St. John's Military Academy		T 4–4		
