= 1895 Lafayette football team =

American college football season

1895 Lafayette football
- Conference: Independent
- Record: 6–2
- Head coach: Parke H. Davis (1st season)
- Captain: Gideon Boericke
- Home stadium: March Field

1895 Eastern college football independents records
| | Conf. | | | Overall |
| Team | W | L | T | W | | L | | T |
|---|---|---|---|---|---|---|---|---|
| Penn | | – | | 14 | – | 0 | – | 0 |
| Yale | | – | | 13 | – | 0 | – | 2 |
| Princeton | | – | | 10 | – | 1 | – | 1 |
| Washington & Jefferson | | – | | 6 | – | 1 | – | 1 |
| Harvard | | – | | 8 | – | 2 | – | 1 |
| Lafayette | | – | | 6 | – | 2 | – | 0 |
| Syracuse | | – | | 6 | – | 2 | – | 2 |
| Army | | – | | 5 | – | 2 | – | 0 |
| Bucknell | | – | | 5 | – | 2 | – | 0 |
| Colgate | | – | | 4 | – | 2 | – | 0 |
| Swarthmore | | – | | 7 | – | 4 | – | 1 |
| Tufts | | – | | 8 | – | 5 | – | 0 |
| Villanova | | – | | 4 | – | 2 | – | 0 |
| Wesleyan | | – | | 6 | – | 3 | – | 0 |
| Brown | | – | | 7 | – | 6 | – | 1 |
| Carlisle | | – | | 4 | – | 4 | – | 0 |
| Drexel | | – | | 3 | – | 3 | – | 1 |
| Rhode Island | | – | | 1 | – | 1 | – | 0 |
| Penn State | | – | | 2 | – | 2 | – | 3 |
| Cornell | | – | | 3 | – | 4 | – | 1 |
| Rutgers | | – | | 3 | – | 4 | – | 0 |
| New Hampshire | | – | | 2 | – | 3 | – | 1 |
| Franklin & Marshall | | – | | 3 | – | 5 | – | 1 |
| Boston College | | – | | 2 | – | 4 | – | 2 |
| Lehigh | | – | | 3 | – | 6 | – | 0 |
| CCNY | | – | | 2 | – | 5 | – | 1 |
| Buffalo | | – | | 1 | – | 4 | – | 2 |
| Temple | | – | | 1 | – | 4 | – | 1 |
| MIT | | – | | 1 | – | 4 | – | 0 |
| Trinity (CT) | | – | | 1 | – | 4 | – | 0 |
| Massachusetts | | – | | 1 | – | 5 | – | 0 |
| Western Univ. Penn. | | – | | 1 | – | 6 | – | 0 |
| Geneva | | – | | 0 | – | 5 | – | 0 |
| NYU | | – | | 0 | – | 5 | – | 0 |

The 1895 Lafayette football team represented Lafayette College in the 1895 college football season. Lafayette finished with a 6–2 record in their first year under head coach Parke H. Davis. Significant games included victories over Cornell (6–0) and Lehigh (22–12 and 14–6), and losses to Princeton (0–14) and Penn (0–30). The 1895 Lafayette team outscored its opponents by a combined total of 162 to 62. Lafayette won the 1895 Middle States League championship. No Lafayette players received recognition on the 1895 College Football All-America Team.

== Schedule ==
| Date | Opponent | Site | Result | Attendance | Source |
|---|---|---|---|---|---|
| October 5 | at Orange Athletic Club | Orange Oval; Orange, NJ | W 12–0 | 1,500 | |
| October 12 | at Princeton | University Field; Princeton, NJ | L 0–14 | | |
| October 19 | at Cornell | Percy Field; Ithaca, NY | W 6–0 | | |
| October 24 | Ursinus | March Field; Easton, PA | W 56–0 | | |
| October 26 | at Penn | Franklin Field; Philadelphia | L 0–30 | 8,500 | |
| October 30 | Rutgers | March Field; Easton, PA | W 52–0 | 500 | |
| November 9 | at Lehigh | Bethlehem, PA (rivalry) | W 22–12 | | |
| November 23 | Lehigh | March Field; Easton, PA | W 14–6 | | |
