= Joseph Lawless =

American football coach

Coaching career (HC unless noted)
- 1895: Boston College

Head coaching record
- Overall: 2–4–2

Joseph Lawless was an American college football coach. He was the third head football coach at Boston College, serving for one season, in 1895, and compiling a record of 2–4–2.

== Head coaching record ==
Year	Team	Overall	Conference	Standing	Bowl/playoffs
Boston College (Independent) (1895)
1895	Boston College	2–4–2			
Boston College:		2–4–2			
Total:		2–4–2			
