= 1895 Army Cadets football team =

American college football season

1895 Army Cadets football
- Conference: Independent
- Record: 5–2
- Head coach: Harmon S. Graves (2nd season)
- Captain: Edward Leonard King
- Home stadium: The Plain

1895 Eastern college football independents records
| | Conf. | | | Overall |
| Team | W | L | T | W | | L | | T |
|---|---|---|---|---|---|---|---|---|
| Penn | | – | | 14 | – | 0 | – | 0 |
| Yale | | – | | 13 | – | 0 | – | 2 |
| Princeton | | – | | 10 | – | 1 | – | 1 |
| Washington & Jefferson | | – | | 6 | – | 1 | – | 1 |
| Harvard | | – | | 8 | – | 2 | – | 1 |
| Lafayette | | – | | 6 | – | 2 | – | 0 |
| Syracuse | | – | | 6 | – | 2 | – | 2 |
| Army | | – | | 5 | – | 2 | – | 0 |
| Bucknell | | – | | 5 | – | 2 | – | 0 |
| Colgate | | – | | 4 | – | 2 | – | 0 |
| Swarthmore | | – | | 7 | – | 4 | – | 1 |
| Tufts | | – | | 8 | – | 5 | – | 0 |
| Villanova | | – | | 4 | – | 2 | – | 0 |
| Wesleyan | | – | | 6 | – | 3 | – | 0 |
| Brown | | – | | 7 | – | 6 | – | 1 |
| Carlisle | | – | | 4 | – | 4 | – | 0 |
| Drexel | | – | | 3 | – | 3 | – | 1 |
| Rhode Island | | – | | 1 | – | 1 | – | 0 |
| Penn State | | – | | 2 | – | 2 | – | 3 |
| Cornell | | – | | 3 | – | 4 | – | 1 |
| Rutgers | | – | | 3 | – | 4 | – | 0 |
| New Hampshire | | – | | 2 | – | 3 | – | 1 |
| Franklin & Marshall | | – | | 3 | – | 5 | – | 1 |
| Boston College | | – | | 2 | – | 4 | – | 2 |
| Lehigh | | – | | 3 | – | 6 | – | 0 |
| CCNY | | – | | 2 | – | 5 | – | 1 |
| Buffalo | | – | | 1 | – | 4 | – | 2 |
| Temple | | – | | 1 | – | 4 | – | 1 |
| MIT | | – | | 1 | – | 4 | – | 0 |
| Trinity (CT) | | – | | 1 | – | 4 | – | 0 |
| Massachusetts | | – | | 1 | – | 5 | – | 0 |
| Western Univ. Penn. | | – | | 1 | – | 6 | – | 0 |
| Geneva | | – | | 0 | – | 5 | – | 0 |
| NYU | | – | | 0 | – | 5 | – | 0 |

The 1895 Army Cadets football team represented the United States Military Academy as an independent during the 1895 college football season. In their second and final season under head coach Harmon S. Graves, the Cadets compiled a 5–2 record, shut out five of their seven opponents, and outscored all opponents by a combined total of 141 to 32. The Army–Navy Game was not played in 1895. On November 2, 1895, Army lost to Yale by a 28 to 8 score in what one press account called the greatest and most exciting game of football ever played on the West Point grounds."

No Army Cadets were honored on the 1895 College Football All-America Team.

== Schedule ==
| Date | Opponent | Site | Result | Attendance | Source |
|---|---|---|---|---|---|
| October 5 | Trinity (CT) | The Plain; West Point, NY | W 50–0 | | |
| October 12 | Harvard | The Plain; West Point, NY | L 0–4 | | |
| October 19 | Tufts | The Plain; West Point, NY | W 35–0 | | |
| October 26 | Dartmouth | The Plain; West Point, NY | W 6–0 | 2,000 | |
| November 2 | Yale | The Plain; West Point, NY | L 8–28 | | |
| November 16 | Union (NY) | The Plain; West Point, NY | W 16–0 | | |
| November 23 | Brown | The Plain; West Point, NY | W 26–0 | | |
