= 1895 Buffalo football team =

American college football season

1895 Buffalo football
- Conference: Independent
- Record: 1–4–2
- Head coach: None
- Captain: William J. Bott
- Home stadium: Olympic Park

1895 Eastern college football independents records
	Conf.			Overall
Team	W	L	T	W		L		T
Penn		–		14	–	0	–	0
Yale		–		13	–	0	–	2
Princeton		–		10	–	1	–	1
Washington & Jefferson		–		6	–	1	–	1
Harvard		–		8	–	2	–	1
Lafayette		–		6	–	2	–	0
Syracuse		–		6	–	2	–	2
Army		–		5	–	2	–	0
Bucknell		–		5	–	2	–	0
Colgate		–		4	–	2	–	0
Swarthmore		–		7	–	4	–	1
Tufts		–		8	–	5	–	0
Villanova		–		4	–	2	–	0
Wesleyan		–		6	–	3	–	0
Amherst		–		6	–	5	–	0
Brown		–		7	–	6	–	1
Carlisle		–		4	–	4	–	0
Drexel		–		3	–	3	–	1
Rhode Island		–		1	–	1	–	0
Penn State		–		2	–	2	–	3
Cornell		–		3	–	4	–	1
Rutgers		–		3	–	4	–	0
New Hampshire		–		2	–	3	–	1
Franklin & Marshall		–		3	–	5	–	1
Boston College		–		2	–	4	–	2
Lehigh		–		3	–	6	–	0
CCNY		–		2	–	5	–	1
Buffalo		–		1	–	4	–	2
Temple		–		1	–	4	–	1
MIT		–		1	–	4	–	0
Trinity (CT)		–		1	–	4	–	0
Massachusetts		–		1	–	5	–	0
Western Univ. Penn.		–		1	–	6	–	0
Geneva		–		0	–	5	–	0
NYU		–		0	–	5	–	0

The 1895 Buffalo football team represented the University of Buffalo as an independent during the 1895 college football season. The team compiled a 1–4–2 record. Buffalo had no coach and played its home games at Olympic Park in Buffalo, New York.

== Schedule ==
Date	Time	Opponent	Site	Result	Attendance	Source
October 23		Rochester	Olympic Park; Buffalo, NY	L 4–6	500	
October 26		Lancaster Football Club	Olympic Park; Buffalo, NY	L 6–40	400	
October 30	3:00 p.m.	Buffalo High School	Olympic Park; Buffalo, NY	L 0–2		
November 5		at Batavia	Batavia, NY	Cancelled		
November 13	3:30 p.m.	Buffalo High School	Olympic Park; Buffalo, NY	T 6–6		
November 16	3:00 p.m.	Lancaster Football Club	Olympic Park; Buffalo, NY	L 0–30		
November 20		25th Separate Company of Tonawanda	Olympic Park; Buffalo, NY	W 12–6		
November 23	3:40 p.m.	at Rochester	University of Rochester campus; Rochester, NY	T 6–6		
