= James A. McDonald =

Playing career
- 1895–1896: Villanova

Coaching career (HC unless noted)
- 1895–1896: Villanova

Head coaching record
- Overall: 14–6

James A. McDonald was an American college football player and coach. He served as the head football coach at Villanova College—now known as Villanova University—from 1895 to 1896, compiling a record of 14–6.

== Head coaching record ==
| Year | Team | Overall | Conference | Standing | Bowl/playoffs |
|---|---|---|---|---|---|
Villanova Wildcats (Independent) (1895–1896)
| 1895 | Villanova | 4–2 | | | |
| 1896 | Villanova | 10–4 | | | |
| Villanova: | | 14–6 | | | |
| Total: | | 14–6 | | | |
