= 1895 Tufts Jumbos football team =

American college football season

1895 Tufts Jumbos football
- Conference: Independent
- Record: 8–5
- Head coach: Marshall Newell (1st season)
- Home stadium: Athletic Field at College Hill

1895 Eastern college football independents records
| | Conf. | | | Overall |
| Team | W | L | T | W | | L | | T |
|---|---|---|---|---|---|---|---|---|
| Penn | | – | | 14 | – | 0 | – | 0 |
| Yale | | – | | 13 | – | 0 | – | 2 |
| Princeton | | – | | 10 | – | 1 | – | 1 |
| Washington & Jefferson | | – | | 6 | – | 1 | – | 1 |
| Harvard | | – | | 8 | – | 2 | – | 1 |
| Lafayette | | – | | 6 | – | 2 | – | 0 |
| Syracuse | | – | | 6 | – | 2 | – | 2 |
| Army | | – | | 5 | – | 2 | – | 0 |
| Bucknell | | – | | 5 | – | 2 | – | 0 |
| Colgate | | – | | 4 | – | 2 | – | 0 |
| Swarthmore | | – | | 7 | – | 4 | – | 1 |
| Tufts | | – | | 8 | – | 5 | – | 0 |
| Villanova | | – | | 4 | – | 2 | – | 0 |
| Wesleyan | | – | | 6 | – | 3 | – | 0 |
| Amherst | | – | | 6 | – | 5 | – | 0 |
| Brown | | – | | 7 | – | 6 | – | 1 |
| Carlisle | | – | | 4 | – | 4 | – | 0 |
| Drexel | | – | | 3 | – | 3 | – | 1 |
| Rhode Island | | – | | 1 | – | 1 | – | 0 |
| Penn State | | – | | 2 | – | 2 | – | 3 |
| Cornell | | – | | 3 | – | 4 | – | 1 |
| Rutgers | | – | | 3 | – | 4 | – | 0 |
| New Hampshire | | – | | 2 | – | 3 | – | 1 |
| Franklin & Marshall | | – | | 3 | – | 5 | – | 1 |
| Boston College | | – | | 2 | – | 4 | – | 2 |
| Lehigh | | – | | 3 | – | 6 | – | 0 |
| CCNY | | – | | 2 | – | 5 | – | 1 |
| Buffalo | | – | | 1 | – | 4 | – | 2 |
| Temple | | – | | 1 | – | 4 | – | 1 |
| MIT | | – | | 1 | – | 4 | – | 0 |
| Trinity (CT) | | – | | 1 | – | 4 | – | 0 |
| Massachusetts | | – | | 1 | – | 5 | – | 0 |
| Western Univ. Penn. | | – | | 1 | – | 6 | – | 0 |
| Geneva | | – | | 0 | – | 5 | – | 0 |
| NYU | | – | | 0 | – | 5 | – | 0 |

The 1895 Tufts Jumbos football team was an American football team that represented Tufts College—now known as Tufts University—as an independent during the 1895 college football season. The team compiled an 8–5 record and outscored opponents by a total of 132 to 101. Marshall Newell, a four-time consensus All-American at Harvard, was the team's head coach.

== Schedule ==
| Date | Opponent | Site | Result | Attendance | Source |
|---|---|---|---|---|---|
| September 30 | Boston Latin School | Athletic Field at College Hill; Medford, MA | W 14–0 | 250 | |
| October 2 | at Phillips Exeter | Exeter, NH | W 20–0 | 400 | |
| October 5 | at Phillips Andover | Andover, MA | L 4–6 | 700 | |
| October 9 | Boston College | College Hill athletic grounds; Medford, MA | W 28–0 | 300 | |
| October 12 | at Brown | Lincoln Field; Providence, RI | L 0–28 | 400 | |
| October 17 | Newton Athletic Association | Athletic Field at College Hill; Medford, MA | W 6–0 | | |
| October 19 | at Army | The Plain; West Point, NY | L 0–35 | 1,000 | |
| October 26 | at Worcester Tech | Worcester, MA | W 10–6 | | |
| October 28 | Hopkinson | Athletic Field at College Hill; Medford, MA | W 6–4 | 200 | |
| November 2 | at MIT | South End Grounds; Boston, MA | L 0–6 | 150 | |
| November 6 | Whitman Athletic Club | Athletic Field at College Hill; Medford, MA | W 30–0 | 200 | |
| November 9 | at Wesleyan | Middletown, CT | L 10–16 | | |
| November 20 | Trinity (CT) | Athletic Field at College Hill; Medford, MA | W 4–0 | 500 | |
