= 1895 Drexel Dragons football team =

American college football season

1895 Drexel Dragons football
- Conference: Independent
- Record: 3–3–1
- Head coach: None

1895 Eastern college football independents records
	Conf.			Overall
Team	W	L	T	W		L		T
Penn		–		14	–	0	–	0
Yale		–		13	–	0	–	2
Princeton		–		10	–	1	–	1
Washington & Jefferson		–		6	–	1	–	1
Harvard		–		8	–	2	–	1
Lafayette		–		6	–	2	–	0
Syracuse		–		6	–	2	–	2
Army		–		5	–	2	–	0
Bucknell		–		5	–	2	–	0
Colgate		–		4	–	2	–	0
Swarthmore		–		7	–	4	–	1
Tufts		–		8	–	5	–	0
Villanova		–		4	–	2	–	0
Wesleyan		–		6	–	3	–	0
Amherst		–		6	–	5	–	0
Brown		–		7	–	6	–	1
Carlisle		–		4	–	4	–	0
Drexel		–		3	–	3	–	1
Rhode Island		–		1	–	1	–	0
Penn State		–		2	–	2	–	3
Cornell		–		3	–	4	–	1
Rutgers		–		3	–	4	–	0
New Hampshire		–		2	–	3	–	1
Franklin & Marshall		–		3	–	5	–	1
Boston College		–		2	–	4	–	2
Lehigh		–		3	–	6	–	0
CCNY		–		2	–	5	–	1
Buffalo		–		1	–	4	–	2
Temple		–		1	–	4	–	1
MIT		–		1	–	4	–	0
Trinity (CT)		–		1	–	4	–	0
Massachusetts		–		1	–	5	–	0
Western Univ. Penn.		–		1	–	6	–	0
Geneva		–		0	–	5	–	0
NYU		–		0	–	5	–	0

The 1895 Drexel Dragons football team represented the Drexel Institute of Technology (renamed Drexel University in 1970) as an independent during the 1895 college football season. The team did not have a head coach.

== Schedule ==
Date	Opponent	Site	Result	Source
October 19	at Bordentown Military Institute	Bordentown, NJ	W 12–0	
October 20	Media High School		Unknown	
October	at Mainheim		L 10–12	
October 30	Friends' Central School	YMCA	W 10–0	
November 9	at Media Shortlidge Academy	Media, PA	T 4–4	
November 13	at Chester High School	Chester, PA	L 4–16	
November 15	Chester High School	YMCA; Philadelphia, PA	W Forfeit	
November 18	at Pennsylvania School for the Deaf and Dumb	Mount Airy, Philadelphia	Unknown	
November 22	Central High School	University of Pennsylvania; Philadelphia, PA	L 2–18	

== Roster ==
1896 Drexel Dragons football team roster
Players
Coaches
Offense

Pos.	#	Name	Class
[[American football positions|]]		William Storm
[[American football positions|]]		Clarence Williams
[[American football positions|]]		James Newkirk

Defense

Pos.	#	Name	Class

Special teams

Pos.	#	Name	Class

Head coach

- No coach

Coordinators/assistant coaches

Legend

- (C) Team captain
- (S) Suspended
- (I) Ineligible
- Injured
- Redshirt
