= 1895 Lehigh football team =

American college football season

1895 Lehigh football
- Conference: Independent
- Record: 3–6
- Head coach: Laurie Bliss (1st season)

1895 Eastern college football independents records
	Conf.			Overall
Team	W	L	T	W		L		T
Penn		–		14	–	0	–	0
Yale		–		13	–	0	–	2
Princeton		–		10	–	1	–	1
Washington & Jefferson		–		6	–	1	–	1
Harvard		–		8	–	2	–	1
Lafayette		–		6	–	2	–	0
Syracuse		–		6	–	2	–	2
Army		–		5	–	2	–	0
Bucknell		–		5	–	2	–	0
Colgate		–		4	–	2	–	0
Swarthmore		–		7	–	4	–	1
Tufts		–		8	–	5	–	0
Villanova		–		4	–	2	–	0
Wesleyan		–		6	–	3	–	0
Amherst		–		6	–	5	–	0
Brown		–		7	–	6	–	1
Carlisle		–		4	–	4	–	0
Drexel		–		3	–	3	–	1
Rhode Island		–		1	–	1	–	0
Penn State		–		2	–	2	–	3
Cornell		–		3	–	4	–	1
Rutgers		–		3	–	4	–	0
New Hampshire		–		2	–	3	–	1
Frankin & Marshall		–		3	–	5	–	1
Boston College		–		2	–	4	–	2
Lehigh		–		3	–	6	–	0
CCNY		–		2	–	5	–	1
Buffalo		–		1	–	4	–	2
Temple		–		1	–	4	–	1
MIT		–		1	–	4	–	0
Trinity (CT)		–		1	–	4	–	0
Massachusetts		–		1	–	5	–	0
Western Univ. Penn.		–		1	–	6	–	0
Geneva		–		0	–	5	–	0
NYU		–		0	–	5	–	0

The 1895 Lehigh football team was an American football team that represented Lehigh University as an independent during the 1895 college football season. In its first and only season under head coach Laurie Bliss, the team compiled a 3–6 record and were outscored by their opponents by a total of 134 to 63.

== Schedule ==
Date	Opponent	Site	Result	Attendance	Source
September 28	Rutgers	Bethlehem, PA	W 25–0		
October 14	at Penn	Franklin Field; Philadelphia, PA	L 0–54		
October 18	vs. Princeton	Philadelphia Ball Park; Philadelphia, PA	L 0–16	2,000	
October 26	at Brown	Lincoln Field; Providence, RI	L 4–22	1,500	
November 2	at Orange Athletic Club	Orange Oval; East Orange, NJ	L 0–2		
November 9	Lafayette	Bethlehem, PA (rivalry)	L 12–22		
November 16	at Navy	Worden Field; Annapolis, MD	W 6–4		
November 23	at Lafayette	March Field; Easton, PA	L 6–14		
November 28	Baltimore Athletic Club	Bethlehem, PA	W 10–0		
