= J. P. Linn =

American football player and coach (1870–1949)

Biographical details
- Born: February 24, 1870; Shippensburg, Pennsylvania, U.S.
- Died: June 9, 1949 (aged 79); Redwood Falls, Minnesota, U.S.

Playing career
- early 1890s: Washington & Jefferson
- Position: End

Coaching career (HC unless noted)
- 1895: Western U. of Pennsylvania

Head coaching record
- Overall: 1–6

James Patterson Linn (February 24, 1870 – June 9, 1949) was an American football coach. He served and the head football coach at the Western University of Pennsylvania—now known as the University of Pittsburgh—in 1895, compiling a record of 1–6.

Linn was born in Shippensburg, Pennsylvania in 1870. He died in Redwood Falls, Minnesota in 1949 and was buried in Redwood Falls Cemetery.

== Head coaching record ==
| Year | Team | Overall | Conference | Standing | Bowl/playoffs |
|---|---|---|---|---|---|
Western University of Pennsylvania (Independent) (1895)
| 1895 | Western University of Pennsylvania | 1–6 | | | |
| Western University of Pennsylvania: | | 1–6 | | | |
| Total: | | 1–6 | | | |
