= 1895 NYU Violets football team =

American college football season

1895 NYU Violets football
- Conference: Independent
- Record: 0–5

1895 Eastern college football independents records
	Conf.			Overall
Team	W	L	T	W		L		T
Penn		–		14	–	0	–	0
Yale		–		13	–	0	–	2
Princeton		–		10	–	1	–	1
Washington & Jefferson		–		6	–	1	–	1
Harvard		–		8	–	2	–	1
Lafayette		–		6	–	2	–	0
Syracuse		–		6	–	2	–	2
Army		–		5	–	2	–	0
Bucknell		–		5	–	2	–	0
Colgate		–		4	–	2	–	0
Swarthmore		–		7	–	4	–	1
Tufts		–		8	–	5	–	0
Villanova		–		4	–	2	–	0
Wesleyan		–		6	–	3	–	0
Amherst		–		6	–	5	–	0
Brown		–		7	–	6	–	1
Carlisle		–		4	–	4	–	0
Drexel		–		3	–	3	–	1
Rhode Island		–		1	–	1	–	0
Penn State		–		2	–	2	–	3
Cornell		–		3	–	4	–	1
Rutgers		–		3	–	4	–	0
New Hampshire		–		2	–	3	–	1
Franklin & Marshall		–		3	–	5	–	1
Boston College		–		2	–	4	–	2
Lehigh		–		3	–	6	–	0
CCNY		–		2	–	5	–	1
Buffalo		–		1	–	4	–	2
Temple		–		1	–	4	–	1
MIT		–		1	–	4	–	0
Trinity (CT)		–		1	–	4	–	0
Massachusetts		–		1	–	5	–	0
Western Univ. Penn.		–		1	–	6	–	0
Geneva		–		0	–	5	–	0
NYU		–		0	–	5	–	0

The 1895 NYU Violets football team was an American football team that represented New York University as an independent during the 1895 college football season. The Violets compiled an 0–5 record for the season.

== Schedule ==
Date	Time	Opponent	Site	Result	Source
October 19		at Wesleyan	Middletown, CT	L 6–46	
October 26		at Rutgers	Neilson Field; New Brunswick, NJ	L 0–16	
November 2		at Trinity (CT)	Hartford, CT	L 0–30	
November 7	3:30 p.m.	vs. CCNY	Berkeley Oval; New York, NY	L 6–12	
November 28		at New Jersey Athletic Club	Bergen Point, NJ	L 0–12	
