= 1895 Rhode Island football team =

American college football season

1895 Rhode Island football
- Conference: Independent
- Record: 1–1
- Head coach: None

1895 Eastern college football independents records
| | Conf. | | | Overall |
| Team | W | L | T | W | | L | | T |
|---|---|---|---|---|---|---|---|---|
| Penn | | – | | 14 | – | 0 | – | 0 |
| Yale | | – | | 13 | – | 0 | – | 2 |
| Princeton | | – | | 10 | – | 1 | – | 1 |
| Washington & Jefferson | | – | | 6 | – | 1 | – | 1 |
| Harvard | | – | | 8 | – | 2 | – | 1 |
| Lafayette | | – | | 6 | – | 2 | – | 0 |
| Syracuse | | – | | 6 | – | 2 | – | 2 |
| Army | | – | | 5 | – | 2 | – | 0 |
| Bucknell | | – | | 5 | – | 2 | – | 0 |
| Colgate | | – | | 4 | – | 2 | – | 0 |
| Swarthmore | | – | | 7 | – | 4 | – | 1 |
| Tufts | | – | | 8 | – | 5 | – | 0 |
| Villanova | | – | | 4 | – | 2 | – | 0 |
| Wesleyan | | – | | 6 | – | 3 | – | 0 |
| Amherst | | – | | 6 | – | 5 | – | 0 |
| Brown | | – | | 7 | – | 6 | – | 1 |
| Carlisle | | – | | 4 | – | 4 | – | 0 |
| Drexel | | – | | 3 | – | 3 | – | 1 |
| Rhode Island | | – | | 1 | – | 1 | – | 0 |
| Penn State | | – | | 2 | – | 2 | – | 3 |
| Cornell | | – | | 3 | – | 4 | – | 1 |
| Rutgers | | – | | 3 | – | 4 | – | 0 |
| New Hampshire | | – | | 2 | – | 3 | – | 1 |
| Franklin & Marshall | | – | | 3 | – | 5 | – | 1 |
| Boston College | | – | | 2 | – | 4 | – | 2 |
| Lehigh | | – | | 3 | – | 6 | – | 0 |
| CCNY | | – | | 2 | – | 5 | – | 1 |
| Buffalo | | – | | 1 | – | 4 | – | 2 |
| Temple | | – | | 1 | – | 4 | – | 1 |
| MIT | | – | | 1 | – | 4 | – | 0 |
| Trinity (CT) | | – | | 1 | – | 4 | – | 0 |
| Massachusetts | | – | | 1 | – | 5 | – | 0 |
| Western Univ. Penn. | | – | | 1 | – | 6 | – | 0 |
| Geneva | | – | | 0 | – | 5 | – | 0 |
| NYU | | – | | 0 | – | 5 | – | 0 |

The 1895 Rhode Island football team represented Rhode Island College of Agriculture and the Mechanic Arts, now known as the University of Rhode Island, as an independent during the 1895 college football season. The team had no coach. The team compiled an overall record of 1–1 and were outscored by a total of 10 to 6. It was the team's first season of intercollegiate football.

== Schedule ==
| Date | Opponent | Site | Result | Source |
|---|---|---|---|---|
| October 24 | Pawtucket High School | Kingston, RI | W 6–0 | |
| November 16 | Friends School | | L 10–0 | |
