= 1895 Amherst football team =

American college football season

1895 Amherst football
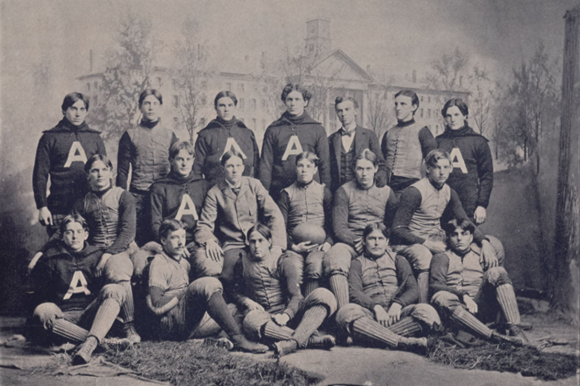
- Conference: Triangular Football League
- Record: 6–5 (1–1 TFL)
- Head coach: George A. Gray (1st season)
- Captain: John T. Pratt
- Home stadium: Pratt Field

1895 Triangular Football League standings
	Conf.					Overall
Team	W		L		T	W		L		T
Dartmouth $	2	–	0	–	0	7	–	5	–	1
Amherst	1	–	1	–	0	6	–	5	–	0
Williams	0	–	2	–	0	4	–	5	–	0
$ – Conference champion

The 1895 Amherst football team represented the Amherst College as a member of the Triangular Football League (TFL) during the 1895 college football season. Led by first-year head coach George A. Gray, Amherst compiled an overall record of 6–5 with a mark of 1–1 in conference play, placing second in the TFL. John T. Pratt served as team captain. The team played home games at Pratt Field in Amherst, Massachusetts.

Gray had played football at Harvard University the previous three season as a halfback.

== Schedule ==
Date	Time	Opponent	Site	Result	Attendance	Source
September 25		at Massachusetts*	Amherst, MA	W 42–0		
October 2		Northampton YMCA*	Pratt Field; Amherst, MA	W 68–0		
October 5	3:30 p.m.	at Harvard*	Soldiers' Field; Cambridge, MA	L 0–24	5,000	
October 9		at Yale*	Yale Field; New Haven, CT	L 0–38		
October 12		at Boston Athletic Association*	South End Grounds; Boston, MA	L 0–20	300	
October 16		Wesleyan*	Pratt Field; Amherst, MA	W 12–10		
October 19	4:00 p.m.	at Crescent Athletic Club*	Eastern Park; Brooklyn, NY	L 0–20	1,000	
October 23		at Wesleyan*	Middletown, CT	W 16–14		
October 26		Boston Tech*	Pratt Field; Amherst, MA	W 20–4	400	
November 2		Williams	Pratt Field; Amherst, MA (rivalry)	W 16–4	1,000	
November 9		at Dartmouth	Alumni Oval; Hanover, NH	L 0–20	1,000–1,500	
*Non-conference game
