= Morris Ely =

American football player and coach (1876–1932)

Biographical details
- Born: April 21, 1876; New York, U.S.
- Died: December 14, 1932 (aged 56); New York, New York, U.S.

Playing career
- 1895–1898: Yale
- Position: Quarterback

Coaching career (HC unless noted)
- 1904–1905: Williams

Head coaching record
- Overall: 9–12

Morris Upham Ely (April 21, 1876 – December 14, 1932) was an American college football player and coach. He served as the head football coach at Williams College in Williamstown, Massachusetts from 1904 to 1905, compiling a record of 9–12. Ely was a quarterback at Yale University in the late 1890s. He later practiced law in Manhattan and was active in politics as a member of the Republican Party. He died there, on December 14, 1932, when he committed suicide by jumping from the tenth floor of the building of 50 Vanderbilt Avenue, which houses the Yale Club of New York City.

== Head coaching record ==
Year	Team	Overall	Conference	Standing	Bowl/playoffs
Williams Ephs (Independent) (1904–1905)
1904	Williams	3–7			
1905	Williams	6–5			
Williams:		9–12			
Total:		9–12			
