= Clint Wyckoff =

American football player (1874–1947)

Profile
- Position: Quarterback

Personal information
- Born: September 4, 1874; Elmira, New York, U.S.
- Died: August 16, 1947 (aged 72); Buffalo, New York, U.S.
- Listed height: 5 ft 7 in (1.70 m)
- Listed weight: 141 lb (64 kg)

Career information
- College: Cornell (1895)

Awards and highlights
- Consensus All-American (1895)
- College Football Hall of Fame (Class of 1970)

Clinton Randolph Wyckoff (September 4, 1874 – August 16, 1947) was an American college football player, and the first consensus All-American not from Yale, Harvard, Princeton or Penn. He was elected to the College Football Hall of Fame in 1970.

Wyckoff was born in Elmira, New York and attended Elmira Free Academy. He then attended Cornell University, just to Elmira's north, where he was graduated in 1896. At Cornell he was captain of the football team immediately succeeding the Pop Warner. He was also a member of the Kappa Alpha Society at Cornell.

Wyckoff later went on to work for Atlas Steel Company.
