= Sam Thorne =

American football player and coach (1873–1930)

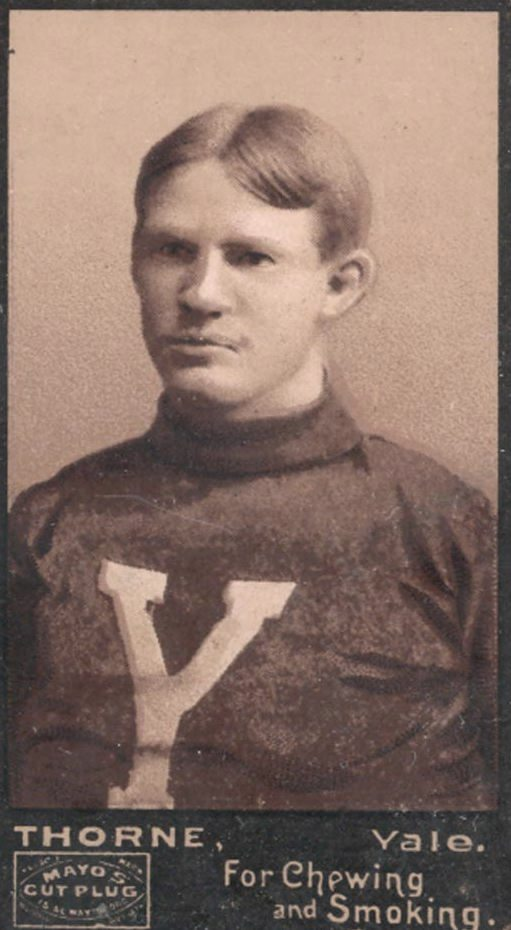

Biographical details
- Born: September 19, 1873; New York, New York, U.S.
- Died: June 3, 1930 (aged 56); New York, New York, U.S.

Playing career
- 1893–1895: Yale
- Position: Halfback

Coaching career (HC unless noted)
- 1896: Yale

Head coaching record
- Overall: 13–1

Accomplishments and honors

Awards
- Consensus All-American (1895)
- College Football Hall of Fame; Inducted in 1970 (profile)

Samuel Brinckerhoff "Brinck" Thorne (September 19, 1873 – June 3, 1930) was an American college football player and coach. He played at Yale University as halfback from 1893 to 1894. As a senior and team captain in 1895, Thorn was named an All-American. He returned to Yale in 1896 to serve as head football coach for a season, during which he guided the Bulldogs to a 13–1 record. Thorne was inducted into the College Football Hall of Fame as a player in 1970.

== Biography ==
Born in New York City, Thorne graduated from Yale University in 1896 and was a member of Skull and Bones. He played for Yale for three years, was captain his senior year, and he was selected for the 1895 College Football All-America Team. He studied mining engineering at Lafayette College and was in the mining business for many years.

== Head coaching record ==
Year	Team	Overall	Conference	Standing	Bowl/playoffs
Yale Bulldogs (Independent) (1896)
1896	Yale	13–1			
Yale:		13–1			
Total:		13–1			
