= 1895 college football season =

American college football season

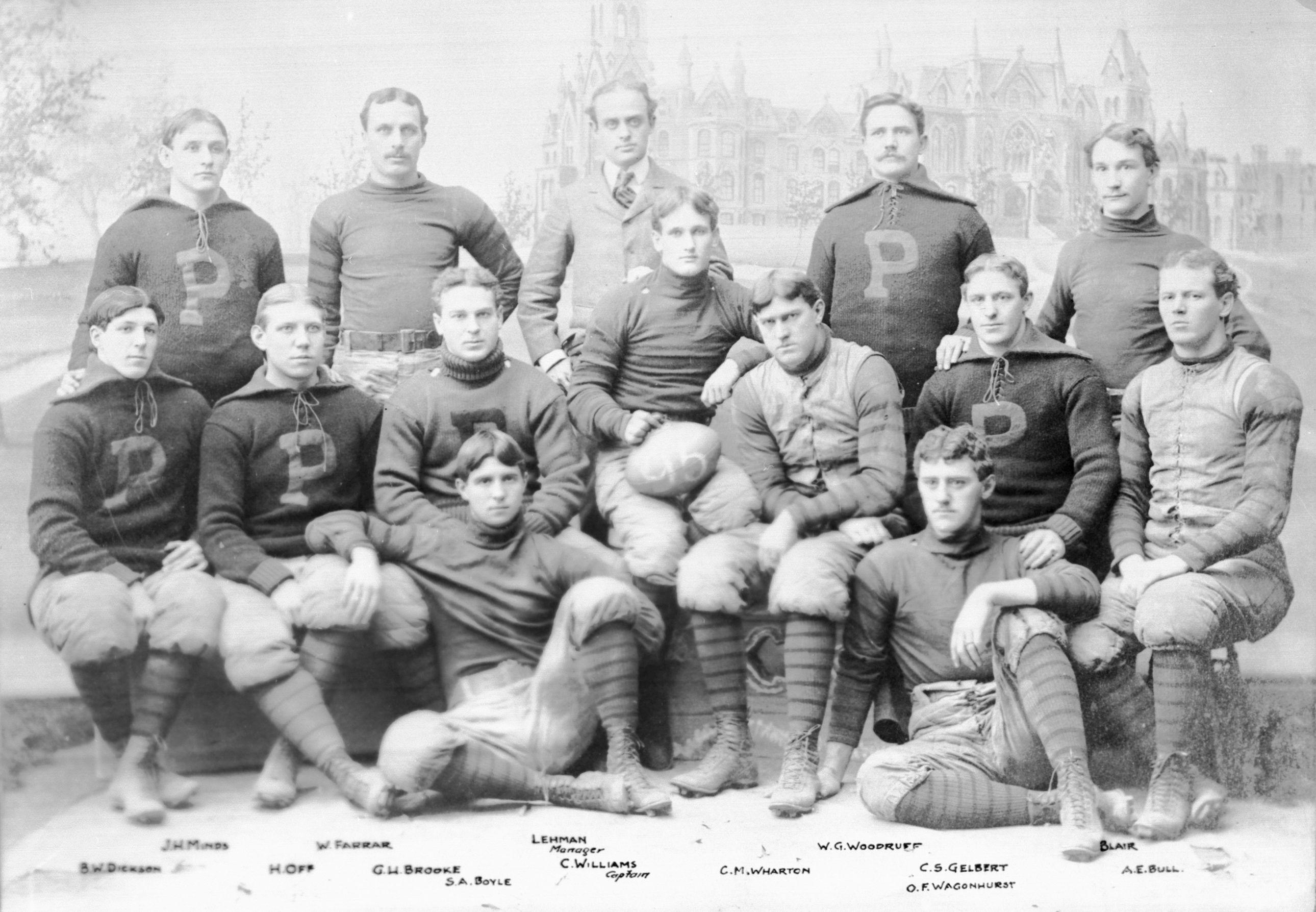
- 1895 Penn Quakers
- Total No. of teams: 27
- Regular season: September 7 to November 28
- Champion(s): Pennsylvania; Yale

The 1895 college football season was the season of American football played among colleges and universities in the United States during the 1895–96 academic year.

The 1895 Penn Quakers football team, led by head coach George Washington Woodruff, compiled a perfect 14–0 record and is recognized as the 1895 national champion by the Billingsley Report, Helms Athletic Foundation, Houlgate System, and National Championship Foundation. One selector, Parke H. Davis, recognized both Penn and Yale as co-national champions. Yale compiled a 13–0–2 record.

In the Midwest, Michigan led the way with an 8–1 record, the only loss coming in a road game against Harvard. In the South, the Southern Intercollegiate Athletic Association played its first year of college football with Vanderbilt winning the first conference championship.

Ten of the eleven players selected by Walter Camp and Caspar Whitney to the 1895 All-America college football team came from Penn, Yale, Harvard, and Princeton. The eleventh player was quarterback Clint Wyckoff from Cornell. Six of the honorees have been inducted into the College Football Hall of Fame: Wyckoff, halfbacks Sam Thorne (Yale) and George H. Brooke(Penn), fullback Charley Brewer (Harvard), end Charles Gelbert (Penn), tackle Langdon Lea (Princeton), and guard Charles Wharton (Penn).

== Conference and program changes ==
- The Southern Intercollegiate Athletic Association began its first season of play in 1895.

School	1894 Conference	1895 Conference
Alabama Crimson Tide	Independent	SIAA
Auburn Tigers	Independent	SIAA
Georgia Bulldogs	Independent	SIAA
Henry Kendall Orange and Black	Program established	Independent
Marshall football	Program established	Independent
Mississippi A&M Aggies	Program established	Independent
North Carolina Tar Heels	Independent	SIAA
Oklahoma Sooners	Program established	Independent
Sewanee Tigers	Independent	SIAA
Tulane Green Wave	Independent	SIAA
Vanderbilt Commodores	Independent	SIAA

== Conference standings ==
=== Conference standings ===
1895 Colorado Football Association standings
	Conf.					Overall
Team	W		L		T	W		L		T
Colorado $	3	–	0	–	0	5	–	1	–	0
Colorado Mines	1	–	1	–	0	1	–	1	–	0
Denver	0	–	1	–	1	0	–	3	–	2
Colorado College	0	–	2	–	1	1	–	2	–	1
$ – Conference champion

1895 Southern Intercollegiate Athletic Association football standings
	Conf.					Overall
Team	W		L		T	W		L		T
Vanderbilt	3	–	0	–	0	5	–	3	–	1
Auburn	2	–	1	–	0	2	–	1	–	0
Georgia	2	–	2	–	0	3	–	4	–	0
Sewanee	0	–	2	–	0	2	–	2	–	1
Alabama	0	–	2	–	0	0	–	4	–	0

1895 Triangular Football League standings
	Conf.					Overall
Team	W		L		T	W		L		T
Dartmouth $	2	–	0	–	0	7	–	5	–	1
Amherst	1	–	1	–	0	6	–	5	–	0
Williams	0	–	2	–	0	4	–	5	–	0
$ – Conference champion

1895 Western Interstate University Football Association standings
	Conf.					Overall
Team	W		L		T	W		L		T
Missouri +	2	–	1	–	0	7	–	1	–	0
Kansas +	2	–	1	–	0	6	–	1	–	0
Nebraska +	2	–	1	–	0	6	–	3	–	0
Iowa	0	–	3	–	0	2	–	5	–	0
+ – Conference co-champions

=== Independents ===
1895 Eastern college football independents records
	Conf.			Overall
Team	W	L	T	W		L		T
Penn		–		14	–	0	–	0
Yale		–		13	–	0	–	2
Princeton		–		10	–	1	–	1
Washington & Jefferson		–		6	–	1	–	1
Harvard		–		8	–	2	–	1
Lafayette		–		6	–	2	–	0
Syracuse		–		6	–	2	–	2
Army		–		5	–	2	–	0
Bucknell		–		5	–	2	–	0
Colgate		–		4	–	2	–	0
Swarthmore		–		7	–	4	–	1
Tufts		–		8	–	5	–	0
Villanova		–		4	–	2	–	0
Wesleyan		–		6	–	3	–	0
Amherst		–		6	–	5	–	0
Brown		–		7	–	6	–	1
Carlisle		–		4	–	4	–	0
Drexel		–		3	–	3	–	1
Rhode Island		–		1	–	1	–	0
Penn State		–		2	–	2	–	3
Cornell		–		3	–	4	–	1
Rutgers		–		3	–	4	–	0
New Hampshire		–		2	–	3	–	1
Frankin & Marshall		–		3	–	5	–	1
Boston College		–		2	–	4	–	2
Lehigh		–		3	–	6	–	0
CCNY		–		2	–	5	–	1
Buffalo		–		1	–	4	–	2
Temple		–		1	–	4	–	1
MIT		–		1	–	4	–	0
Trinity (CT)		–		1	–	4	–	0
Massachusetts		–		1	–	5	–	0
Western Univ. Penn.		–		1	–	6	–	0
Geneva		–		0	–	5	–	0
NYU		–		0	–	5	–	0

1895 Midwestern college football independents records
	Conf.			Overall
Team	W	L	T	W		L		T
Miami (OH)		–		3	–	0	–	0
Carthage		–		2	–	0	–	0
Washington University		–		2	–	0	–	0
Michigan		–		8	–	1	–	0
Chicago		–		10	–	3	–	0
Wittenberg		–		5	–	2	–	0
Minnesota		–		7	–	3	–	0
Wisconsin		–		5	–	2	–	1
Wabash		–		6	–	3	–	0
Baldwin–Wallace		–		3	–	1	–	0
Notre Dame		–		3	–	1	–	0
Illinois		–		4	–	2	–	1
Buchtel		–		3	–	2	–	0
College of Emporia		–		3	–	2	–	0
Doane		–		3	–	2	–	0
Chicago P&S		–		3	–	2	–	1
Purdue		–		4	–	3	–	0
Indiana		–		4	–	3	–	1
Northwestern		–		6	–	5	–	0
Butler		–		2	–	2	–	0
Cincinnati		–		3	–	3	–	0
Kalamazoo		–		1	–	1	–	0
Michigan State Normal		–		3	–	3	–	0
North Dakota Agricultural		–		1	–	1	–	0
North Dakota		–		1	–	1	–	0
Ohio State		–		4	–	4	–	2
Iowa Agricultural		–		3	–	4	–	0
Ohio		–		2	–	3	–	0
Rush-Lake Forest		–		4	–	6	–	0
Ohio Wesleyan		–		2	–	4	–	1
Haskell		–		1	–	2	–	0
Iowa State Normal		–		1	–	2	–	0
Lake Forest		–		1	–	2	–	0
Northwestern Law		–		1	–	2	–	0
Drake		–		1	–	4	–	0

1895 Southern college football independents records
	Conf.			Overall
Team	W	L	T	W		L		T
Texas		–		5	–	0	–	0
LSU		–		3	–	0	–	0
Arkansas		–		1	–	0	–	0
Henry Kendall		–		1	–	0	–	0
North Carolina		–		7	–	1	–	1
VMI		–		5	–	1	–	0
West Virginia		–		5	–	1	–	0
Centre		–		4	–	1	–	1
Virginia		–		9	–	3	–	0
Wofford		–		3	–	1	–	0
Navy		–		5	–	2	–	0
Ole Miss		–		2	–	1	–	0
South Carolina		–		2	–	1	–	0
VAMC		–		4	–	2	–	0
Tulane		–		3	–	2	–	0
Tennessee		–		3	–	2	–	1
Centenary		–		1	–	1	–	0
Guilford		–		1	–	1	–	0
Kentucky State College		–		4	–	5	–	0
North Carolina A&M		–		1	–	2	–	1
Central (KY)		–		1	–	2	–	0
Wake Forest		–		0	–	0	–	1
Marshall		–		0	–	1	–	1
Delaware		–		1	–	3	–	0
Columbian		–		0	–	1	–	1
Richmond		–		0	–	5	–	1
Catholic University		–		0	–	1	–	0
Oklahoma		–		0	–	1	–	0
Furman		–		0	–	2	–	0
Mississippi A&M		–		0	–	2	–	0

1895 Far West college football independents records
	Conf.			Overall
Team	W	L	T	W		L		T
Occidental		–		5	–	0	–	0
New Mexico A&M		–		2	–	0	–	0
Washington Agricultural		–		2	–	0	–	0
Gonzaga		–		1	–	0	–	0
Wyoming		–		1	–	0	–	0
Stanford		–		4	–	0	–	1
Washington		–		4	–	0	–	1
California		–		3	–	1	–	1
Pacific (CA)		–		0	–	0	–	1
Saint Mary's		–		1	–	1	–	0
San Jose Normal		–		0	–	0	–	1
USC		–		0	–	1	–	1
Idaho		–		0	–	1	–	0
Utah		–		0	–	1	–	0

=== Minor conferences ===
Conference	Champion(s)	Record
Michigan Intercollegiate Athletic Association	Olivet	3–0

== See also ==
- 1895 College Football All-America Team
