= MIT Engineers football =

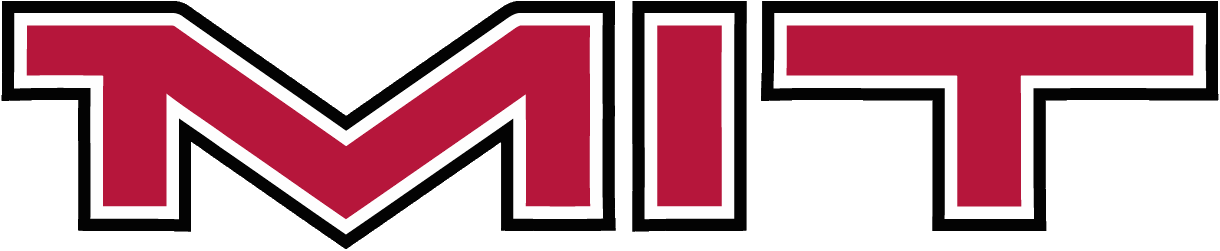
- First season: 1881; 144 years ago
- Head coach: Brian Bubna; 7th season, 31–26 (.544)
- Stadium: Steinbrenner Stadium
- Location: Cambridge, Massachusetts
- NCAA division: Division III
- Conference: NEWMAC
- Colors: Cardinal red and steel gray
- Website: mitathletics.com/football

The MIT Engineers football program represents the Massachusetts Institute of Technology in the American football intercollegiate sport. The team plays in New England Women's and Men's Athletic Conferences (NEWMAC) and competes in Division III of the NCAA. Home games are played at Henry G. Steinbrenner '27 Stadium, located on the Institute's campus. The current coach is Brian Bubna.

== History ==
The initial MIT football team, nicknamed the Techmen, recorded its first victory by defeating Exeter College, 2–0, in 1881. In 1901, the MIT student body voted 119–117 to discontinue the intercollegiate football squad. The university did continue to field sophomore and freshman football teams into the 1920s. The last game played against another university was the MIT sophomore team against the Harvard freshman team in 1901.

In 1978, a group of students self-organized to re-establish the team, though none of the school's administration knew at the time. To raise funds, they refereed intramural games, sold hot dogs, painted hurdles for track meets, took grants from the school, and sneaked loans from their fraternity budgets. For their uniforms, the team repurposed those of Rochester Institute of Technology, whose own football program had recently been cut.

Finally, the students met with then-MIT President Jerry Wiesner, who passed the issue toward MIT’s athletic board where Jack Barry, an assistant athletic director, recommended that MIT support the club for at least one season. Jay Glass, who covered the team for MIT’s newspaper, commented, “It was a hack on the university itself.” After a poor first season, the new MIT Engineers won their first victory in 1979 and went 6–1 the next year. In 1987, the club became a varsity program and joined the NCAA Division III. The next year, the team won its first varsity victory of the modern era, beating Stonehill, 29–7.

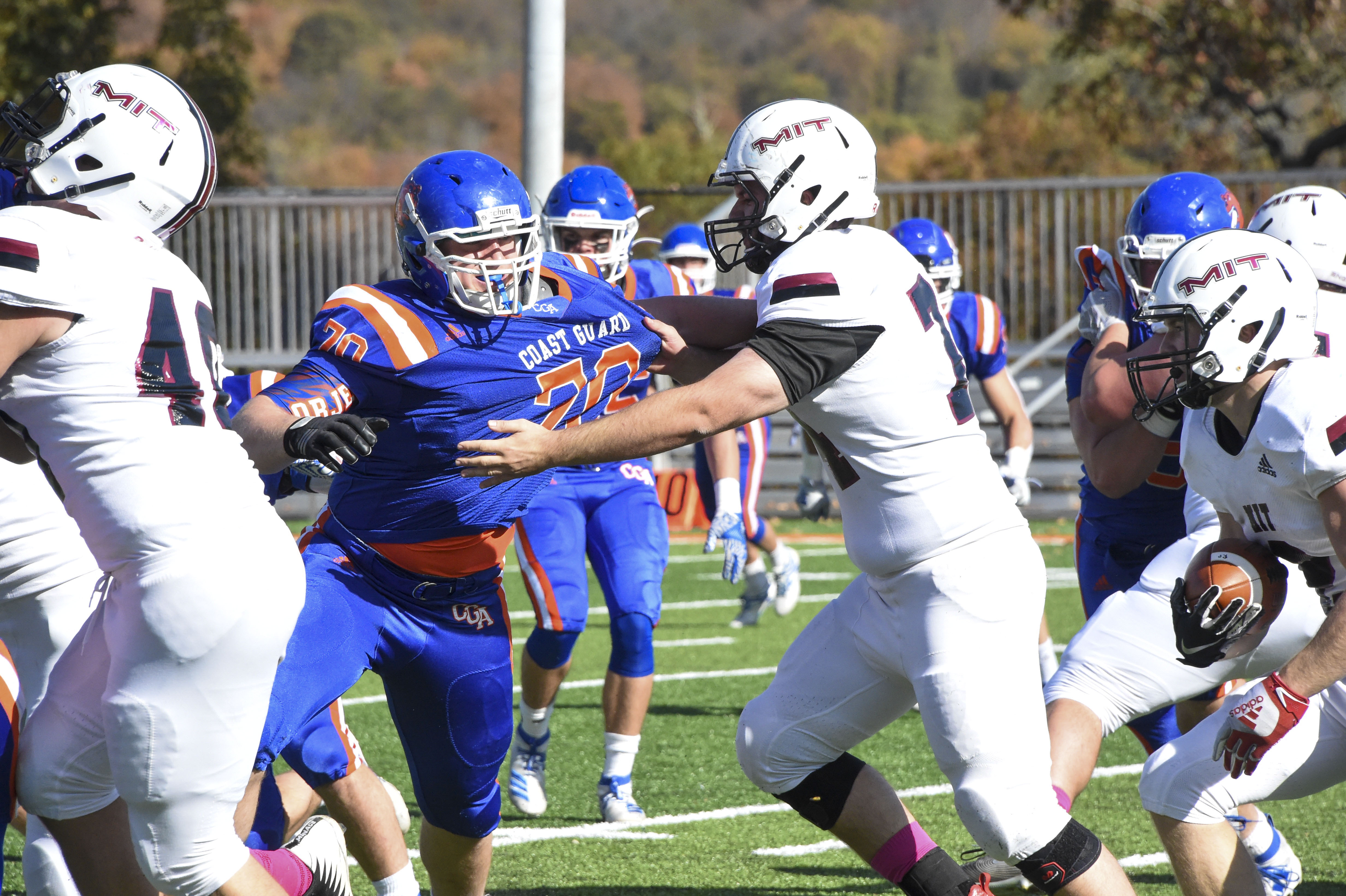
MIT playing against Coast Guard in 2019

In 2014, the Engineers finished the regular season with a 9–0 record and won their first New England Football Conference title. The team returned to the NCAA playoffs in 2018 and 2019, winning back-to-back NEWMAC Championships.

The 2020 season was cancelled due to coronavirus. In 2021, the Engineers finished the year with a 5-4 record.
