= John Heisman =

American sportsman (1869–1936)

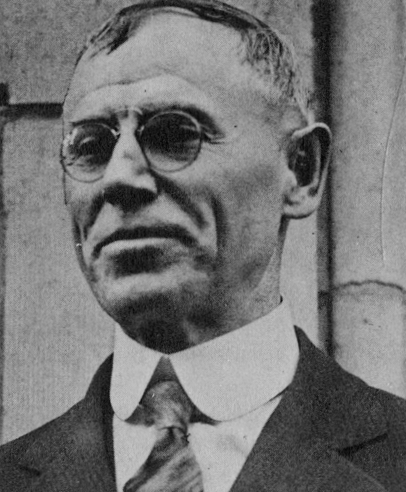
- Heisman, c. 1918

Biographical details
- Born: October 23, 1869; Cleveland, Ohio, U.S.
- Died: October 3, 1936 (aged 66); New York, New York, U.S.

Playing career

Football
- 1887–1888: Brown
- 1889–1891: Penn
- Positions: Center, tackle, end

Coaching career (HC unless noted)

Football
- 1892: Oberlin
- 1893–1894: Buchtel
- 1894: Oberlin
- 1895–1899: Auburn
- 1900–1903: Clemson
- 1904–1919: Georgia Tech
- 1920–1922: Penn
- 1923: Washington & Jefferson
- 1924–1927: Rice

Basketball
- 1908–1909: Georgia Tech
- 1912–1914: Georgia Tech

Baseball
- 1894: Buchtel
- 1901–1903: Clemson
- 1904–1917: Georgia Tech

Administrative career (AD unless noted)
- 1904–1919: Georgia Tech
- 1924–1927: Rice

Head coaching record
- Overall: 186–70–18 (football); 9–14 (basketball); 199–108–7 (baseball)

Accomplishments and honors

Championships
- Football; 1 National (1917); 7 SIAA (1900, 1902–1903, 1915–1918) Baseball; SIAA (1906)
- College Football Hall of Fame; Inducted in 1954 (profile)

John William Heisman (/ˈhaɪzmən/ HYZE-mən; October 23, 1869 – October 3, 1936) was an American sportsman, writer, and actor. He was a player and coach of American football, baseball, and basketball, and served as the head football coach at Oberlin College, Buchtel College (now known as the University of Akron), Auburn University, Clemson University, Georgia Tech, the University of Pennsylvania, Washington & Jefferson College, and Rice University, compiling a career college football coaching record of 186–70–18.

Heisman was also the head basketball coach at Georgia Tech, tallying a mark of 9–14, and the head baseball coach at Buchtel, Clemson, and Georgia Tech, amassing a career college baseball record of 199–108–7. He served as the athletic director at Georgia Tech and Rice. While at Georgia Tech, he was also the president of the Atlanta Crackers baseball team.

Sportswriter Fuzzy Woodruff dubbed Heisman the "pioneer of Southern football". He was inducted into the College Football Hall of Fame as a coach in 1954. His entry there notes that Heisman "stands only behind Amos Alonzo Stagg, Pop Warner, and Walter Camp as a master innovator of the brand of football of his day". He was instrumental in several changes to the game, including legalizing the forward pass. The Heisman Trophy, awarded annually to the season's most outstanding college football player, is named after him.

== Early life and playing career ==
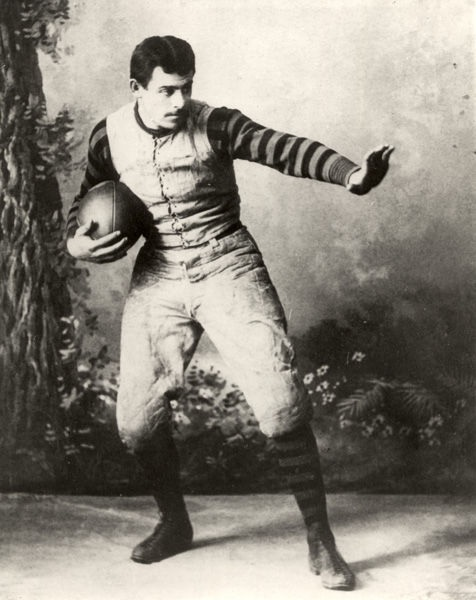
Heisman as a player while a student at University of Pennsylvania Law School, 1891

John Heisman was born Johann Wilhelm Heisman (Note: The name John William was later adopted to obscure the fact that he was the son of immigrants. His father was ostensibly the estranged son of German aristocrats. His mother's grandfather had been an aide-de-campe to Napoleon.) on October 23, 1869, in Cleveland, Ohio, the son of Bavarian German immigrant Johann Michael Heissmann and Sara Lehr Heissmann. He grew up in northwestern Pennsylvania near Titusville and was salutatorian of his graduating class at Titusville High School. His oration at his graduation entitled "The Dramatist as Sermonizer" was described as "full of dramatic emphasis and fire, and showed how the masterpieces of Shakespeare depicted the ends of unchecked passion."

Although he was a drama student, he confessed he was "football mad". He played varsity football for Titusville High School from 1884 to 1886. Heisman's father refused to watch him play at Titusville, calling football "bestial". Heisman went on to play football as a lineman at Brown University and at the University of Pennsylvania. He also played baseball at Penn.

On Brown's football team, he was a substitute guard in 1887, and a starting tackle in 1888. At Penn, he was a substitute center in 1889, a substitute center and tackle in 1890, and a starting end in 1891. Sportswriter Edwin Pope tells us Heisman was "a 158-pound center ... in constant dread that his immediate teammates—guards weighing 212 and 243—would fall on him." He had a flat nose due to being struck in the face by a football, when he tried to block a kick against Penn State by leap-frogging the center.

Heisman graduated from the University of Pennsylvania Law School in 1892. Due to poor eyesight, he took his exams orally.

== Coaching career ==
In his book Principles of Football, Heisman described his coaching strategy: "The coach should be masterful and commanding, even dictatorial. He has no time to say 'please' or 'mister'. At times he must be severe, arbitrary, and little short of a czar." Heisman always used a megaphone at practice. "Heisman's voice was deep, his diction perfect, his tone biting." He was also known for his use of polysyllabic language, and would repeat this annually, at the start of each football season:

What is this? It is a prolate spheroid, an elongated sphere in which the outer leather casing is drawn tightly over a somewhat smaller rubber tubing. Better to have died as a small boy than to fumble this football.

=== Early coaching career: Oberlin and Buchtel ===
Heisman first coached at Oberlin College. In 1892, The Oberlin Review wrote: "Mr. Heisman has entirely remade our football. He has taught us scientific football." He used the double pass, from tackle to halfback, and moved his quarterback to the safety position on defense. Influenced by Yale and Pudge Heffelfinger, Heisman implemented the now illegal "flying wedge" formation. It involved seven players arranged as a "V" to protect the ball carrier. Heisman was also likely influenced by Heffelfinger to pull guards on end runs.

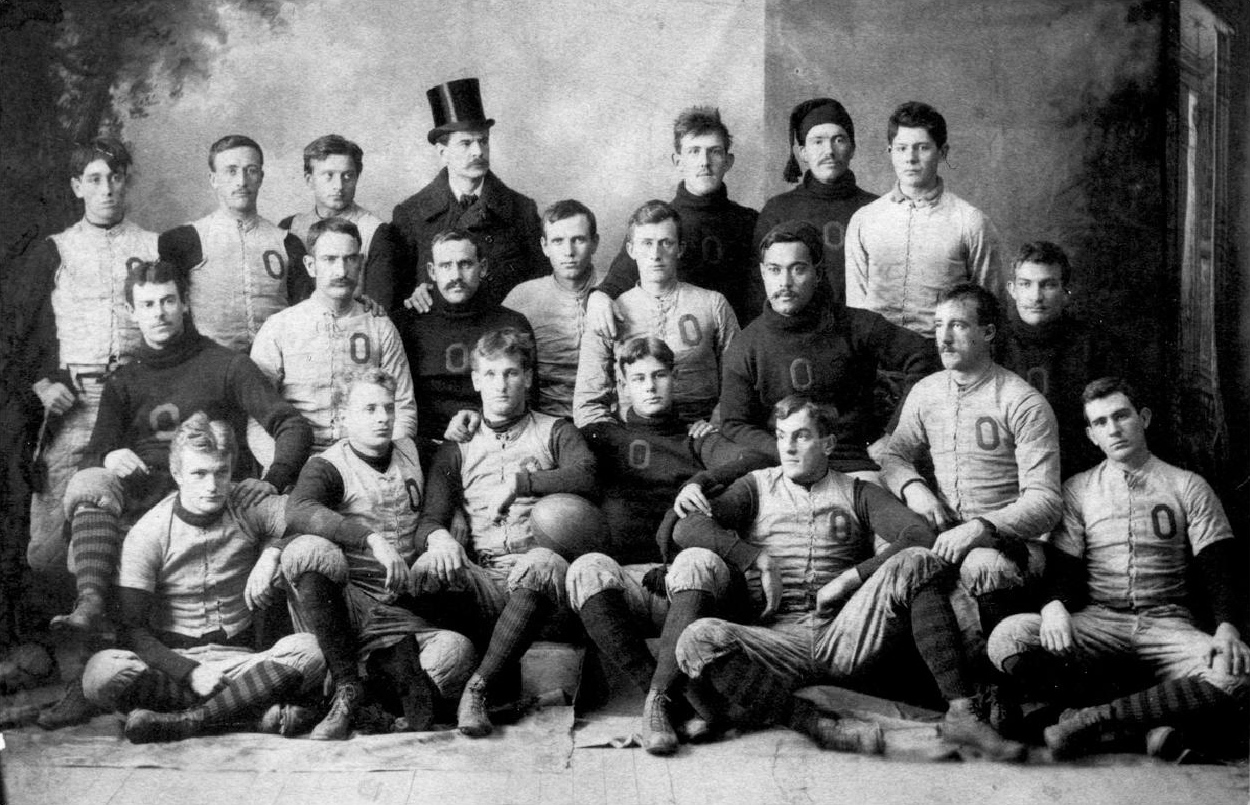
The 1892 Oberlin football team: Heisman on the left in the middle row.

On his 1892 team, Heisman's trainer was Clarence Hemingway, the father of author Ernest Hemingway and one of his linemen was the first Hawaiian to play college football, the future politician John Henry Wise. The team beat Ohio State twice and considered itself undefeated at the end of the season. However, the outcome of its game against Michigan is still in dispute. Michigan declared it had won the game, 26–24, but Oberlin said it won 24–22. The referee, an Oberlin substitute player, had ruled that time had expired. The umpire, a Michigan supporter, ruled otherwise. Michigan's George Jewett, who had scored all of his team's points and was the school's first black player, then ran for a touchdown with no Oberlin players on the field. The Michigan Daily and Detroit Tribune reported that Michigan had won the game, while The Oberlin News and The Oberlin Review reported that Oberlin had won.

In 1893, Heisman became the football and baseball coach at Buchtel College. A disappointing baseball season was made up for by a 5–2 football season. It was then customary for the center to begin a play by rolling or kicking the ball backwards, but this proved difficult for Buchtel's unusually tall quarterback Harry Clark. (Note: Former Yale center Pa Corbin described how one used to snap the ball with his foot: "By standing the ball on end and exercising a certain pressure on the same, it was possible to have it bound into the quarterback's hands.") Under Heisman, the center began tossing the ball to Clark, a practice that eventually evolved into the snap.

The first school to officially defeat Heisman was Case School of Applied Science, known today as Case Western Reserve. Buchtel won a single game against Ohio State at the Ohio State Fair before Heisman returned to Oberlin in 1894, posting a 4–3–1 record, including losses to Michigan and undefeated Penn State. The Penn State game ended with a fair catch and free kick, which resulted in a field goal for Penn State. Referees were confused whether teams could kick a field goal or had to punt on a free kick, and the game ended 6–4 in favor of Oberlin, but Walter Camp over-ruled the game officials, allowing Penn State its extra free kick and the victory 9–6.

=== Auburn ===
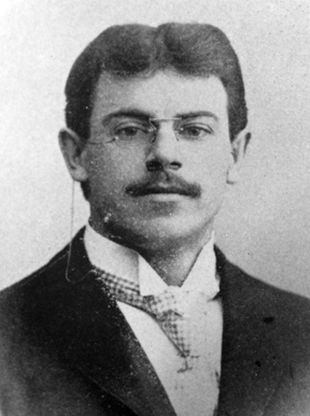
Heisman at Auburn

After his two years at Oberlin and possibly due to the economic Panic of 1893, Heisman invested his savings and began working at a tomato farm in Marshall, Texas. It was hard work in the heat and Heisman was losing money. He was contacted by Walter Riggs, then the manager of the Alabama Polytechnic Institute (Auburn University) football team. Auburn was looking for a football coach, and Heisman was suggested to Riggs by his former player at Oberlin, Penn's then-captain Carl S. Williams. For a salary of $500, he accepted a part-time job as a "trainer".

Heisman coached football at Auburn from 1895 to 1899. Auburn's yearbook, the Glomerata, in 1897 stated "Heisman came to us in the fall of '95, and the day on which he arrived at Auburn can well be marked as the luckiest in the history of athletics at the Alabama Polytechnic Institute." At Auburn, Heisman had the idea for his quarterback to call out "hike" or "hep" to start a play and receive the ball from the center, or to draw the opposing team into an offside penalty. He also used a fake snap to draw the other team offsides. He began his use of a type of delayed buck play where an end took a hand-off, then handed the ball to the halfback on the opposite side, who rushed up the middle. As a coach, Heisman "railed and snorted in practice, imploring players to do their all for God, country, Auburn, and Heisman. Before each game he made squadmen take a nonshirk, nonflinch oath." Due to his fondness for Shakespeare, he would sometimes use a British accent at practice. While it was then illegal to coach from the sidelines during a game, Heisman would sometimes use secret signals with a bottle or a handkerchief to communicate with his team.

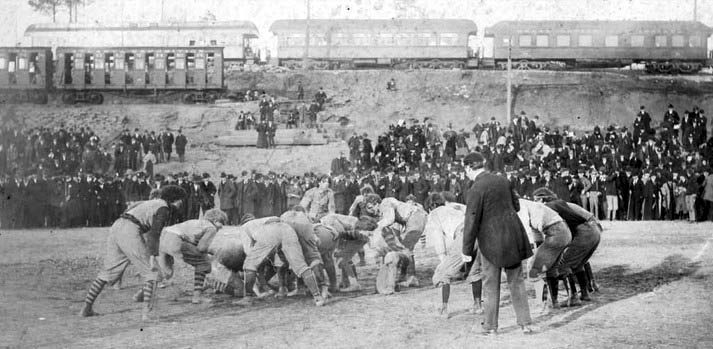
Auburn vs. Georgia in 1895

Heisman's first game as an Auburn coach came against Vanderbilt. Heisman had his quarterback Reynolds Tichenor use the "hidden ball trick" to tie the game at 6 points. However, Vanderbilt answered by kicking a field goal and won 9–6, making it the first game of Southern football decided by a field goal. In the rivalry game with Georgia, Auburn won 16–6. Georgia coach Pop Warner copied the hidden ball trick, and in 1903, his Carlisle team famously used it to defeat Harvard.

Earlier in the 1895 season, Heisman witnessed one of the first illegal forward passes when Georgia faced North Carolina in Atlanta. Georgia was about to block a punt when UNC's Joel Whitaker tossed the ball out of desperation, and George Stephens caught the pass and ran 70 yards for a touchdown. Georgia coach Pop Warner complained to the referee that the play was illegal, but the referee let the play stand because he did not see the pass. Later, Heisman became one of the main proponents of making the forward pass legal.

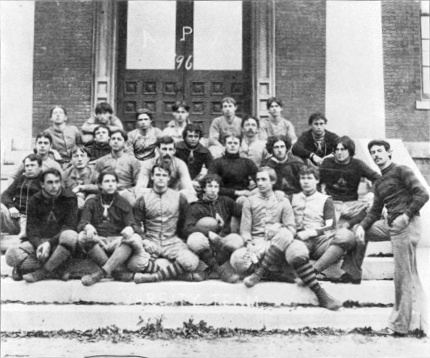
1896 Auburn team, Heisman standing on the right

Lineman Marvin "Babe" Pearce had transferred to Auburn from Alabama, and Reynolds Tichenor was captain of the 1896 Auburn team, which beat Georgia Tech 45–0. Auburn players greased the train tracks the night before the game. Georgia Tech's train did not stop until Loachapoka, and the Georgia Tech players had to walk the 5 miles back to Auburn. This began a tradition of students parading through the streets in their pajamas, known as the "Wreck Tech Pajama Parade". Auburn finished the season by losing 12–6 to Pop Warner's Southern Intercollegiate Athletic Association champion Georgia team, which was led by quarterback Richard Von Albade Gammon. Auburn received its first national publicity when Heisman was able to convince Harper's Weekly to publish the 1896 team's photo.

The 1897 Auburn team featured linemen Pearce and John Penton, a transfer from Virginia. Of its three games, one was a scoreless tie against Sewanee, "The University of the South" in Tennessee. Another was a 14–4 defeat of Nashville, which featured Bradley Walker. Tichenor had transferred to Georgia. Gammon moved to fullback and died in the game against Virginia. Auburn finished the 1897 football season $700 in debt, and in response, Heisman took on the role of a theater producer and staged the comedic play David Garrick. Having made enough money for another football season, the 1898 team won two out of three games, with its loss coming against undefeated North Carolina. After falling behind 13–4 to Georgia, Heisman started using fullback George Mitcham, and won the game 18–17.

The 1899 team, which Heisman considered his best while at Auburn, was led by fullback Arthur Feagin. As Heisman recalled, "I do not think I have ever seen so fast a team as that was." Auburn was leading Georgia by a score of 11–6 when the game was called due to darkness, lighting not being available at that time, resulting in an official scoreless tie. Heisman fitted his linemen with straps and handles under their belts so that the other linemen could hold onto them and prevent the opposing team from breaking through the line. The umpire W. L. Taylor had to cut them.

Auburn lost just one game, 11–10 to the "Iron Men" of Sewanee, who shutout all their other opponents. A report of the game says "Feagin is a player of exceptional ability, and runs with such force that some ground belongs to him on every attempt." Heisman left Auburn after the 1899 season, and wrote a farewell letter with "tears in my eyes, and tears in my voice; tears even in the trembling of my hand". "You will not feel hard toward me; you will forgive me, you will not forget me? Let me ask to retain your friendship. Can a man be associated for five successive seasons with Grand Old Auburn, toiling for her, befriended by her, striving with her, and yet not love her?"

=== Clemson ===
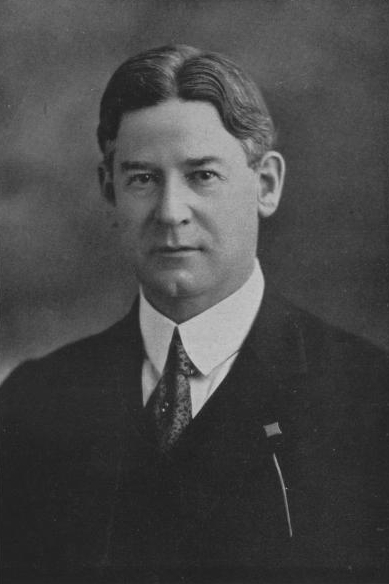
Walter Riggs (pictured) helped get Heisman hired at Auburn and Clemson.

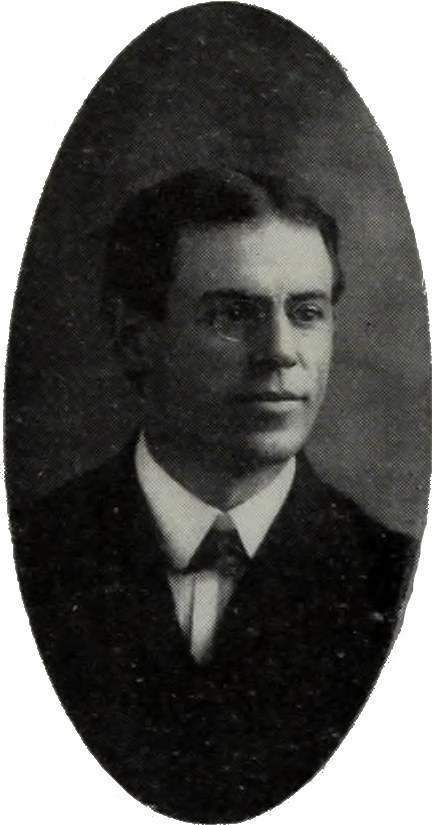
Heisman at Clemson

Heisman was hired by Clemson University as football and baseball coach. He coached at Clemson from 1900 to 1903, and was the first Clemson coach who had experience coaching at another school. He still has the highest winning percentage in school history in both football and baseball. Again Walter Riggs, who moved on from Auburn to coach and manage at Clemson, was instrumental in the hiring. Riggs started an association to help pay Heisman's salary, which was $1,800 per year, and raised $415.11.

Heisman coached baseball from 1901 to 1903, posting a 28–6–1 record. Under Heisman, pitcher Vedder Sitton was considered "one of the best twirlers in the country" and one of "the best pitchers that Clemson ever had".

In his four seasons as Clemson football coach, Heisman won three SIAA titles: in 1900, 1902, and 1903. By the time of his hiring in 1900, Heisman was "the undisputed master of Southern football". Heisman later said that his approach at Clemson was "radically different from anything on earth".

The 1900 season had "the rise of Clemson from a little school whose football teams had never been heard of before, to become a football machine of the very first power." Clemson finished the season undefeated at 6–0, and beat Davidson on opening day by a 64–0 score, then the largest ever made in the South.

Clemson then beat Wofford 21–0, agreeing that every point scored after the first four touchdowns did not count, and South Carolina 51–0. The team also beat Georgia, VPI, and Alabama. Clemson beat Georgia 39–5, and Clemson players were pelted with coal from the nearby dorms. Clemson beat VPI 12–5. The game was called short due to darkness, and on VPI was Hall of Famer Hunter Carpenter. Stars for the Clemson team included captain and tackle Norman Walker, end Jim Lynah, and halfback Buster Hunter.

The 1901 Clemson team beat Guilford on opening day 122–0, scoring the most points in Clemson history, and the next week it tied Tennessee 6–6, finishing the season at 3–1–1. Clemson beat Georgia and lost to VPI 17–11, with Carpenter starring for VPI. The season closed with a defeat of North Carolina. Lynah later transferred to Cornell and played for Pop Warner.

Heisman was described as "a master of taking advantage of the surprise element." The day before the game against Georgia Tech, Heisman sent in substitutes to Atlanta, who checked into a hotel, and partied until dawn. The next day, the varsity team was well rested and prepared, while Georgia Tech was fooled and expected an easy win. Clemson won that game 44–5. In a 28–0 defeat of Furman, an oak tree was on the field, and Heisman called for a lateral pass using the tree as an extra blocker.

The 1902 team went 6–1. Clemson lost 12–6 to the South Carolina Gamecocks in Columbia, for the first time since 1896, when their rivalry began. Several fights broke out that day. As one writer put it: "The Carolina fans that week were carrying around a poster with the image of a tiger with a gamecock standing on top of it, holding the tiger's tail as if he was steering the tiger". Another brawl broke out before both sides agreed to burn the poster in an effort to defuse tensions. In the aftermath, the rivalry was suspended until 1909. The last game of the season, Clemson beat Tennessee 11–0 in the snow, in a game during which Tennessee's Toots Douglas launched a 109-yard punt (the field length was 110 yards in those days).

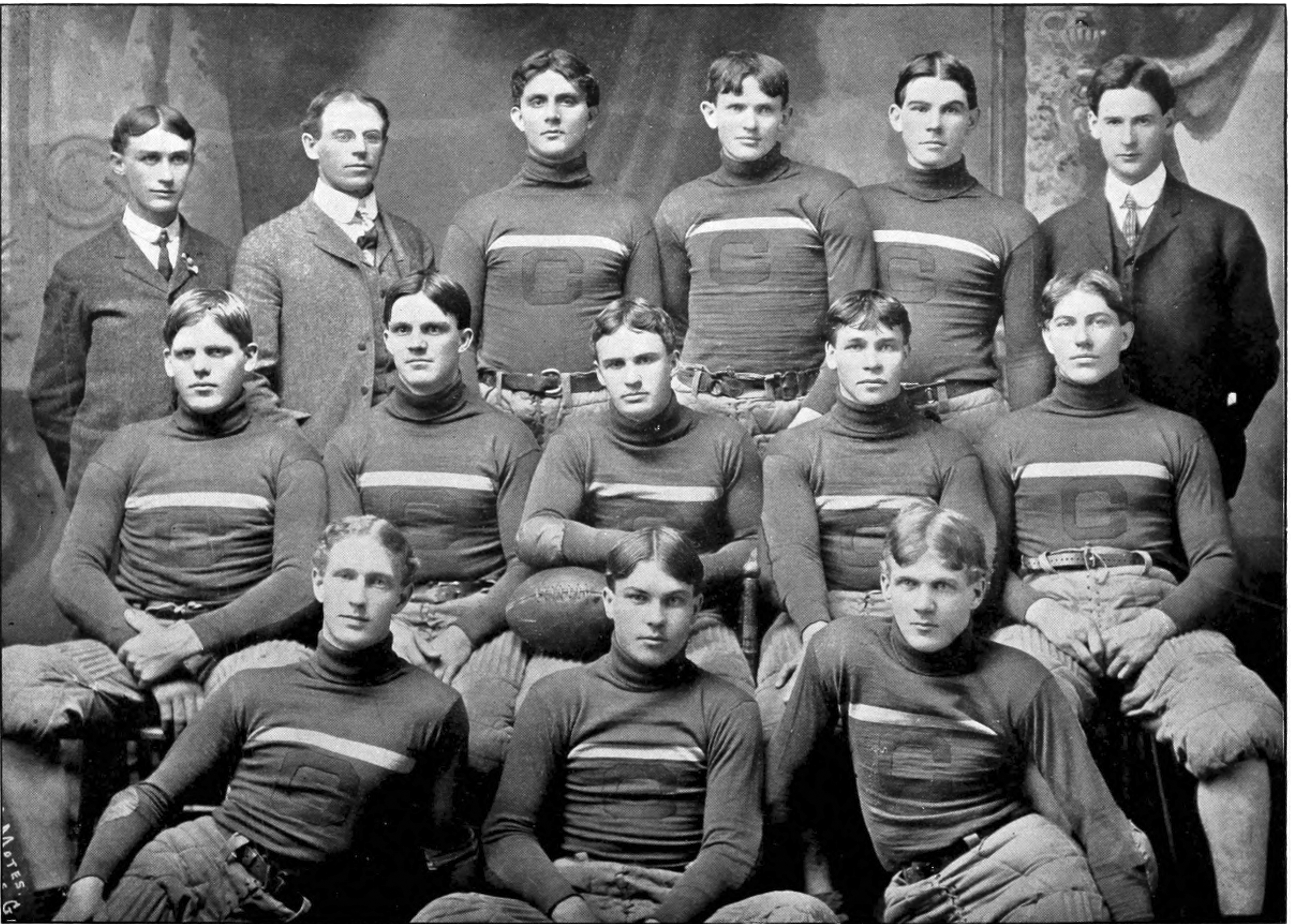
1903 Clemson football team: Heisman in back, second from left with glasses

The 1903 team went 4–1–1, and opened the season by beating Georgia 29–0. The next week, Clemson played Georgia's rival Georgia Tech. To inspire Clemson, Georgia offered a bushel of apples for every point it scored after the 29th. Rushing for 615 yards, Clemson beat Georgia Tech 73–0. The team then beat North Carolina A&M, lost to North Carolina, and beat Davidson.

After the end of the season, a postseason game was scheduled with Cumberland, billed as the championship of the South. Clemson and Cumberland tied 11–11. While both teams can therefore be listed as champion, Heisman named Cumberland champion.

In 1902 and 1903, several Clemson players made the All-Southern team, an all-star team of players from the South selected by several writers after the season, analogous to All-America teams. They included ends Vedder Sitton and Hope Sadler, quarterback Johnny Maxwell, and fullback Jock Hanvey.

Fuzzy Woodruff relates Heisman's role in selecting All-Southern teams: "The first selections that had any pretense of being backed by a judicial consideration were made by W. Reynolds Tichenor...The next selections were made by John W. Heisman, who was as good a judge of football men as the country ever produced."

=== Georgia Tech ===
After the 73–0 defeat by Clemson, Georgia Tech approached Heisman and was able to hire him as a coach and an athletic director. A banner proclaiming "Tech Gets Heisman for 1904" was strung across Atlanta's Piedmont Park. Heisman was hired for $2,250 a year and 30% of the home ticket sales, a $50 raise over his Clemson salary. (Note: Later in his time at Georgia Tech, his salary went up, but the percentage of receipts went down.) He coached Georgia Tech for the longest tenure of his career, 16 years.

==== Baseball and basketball ====
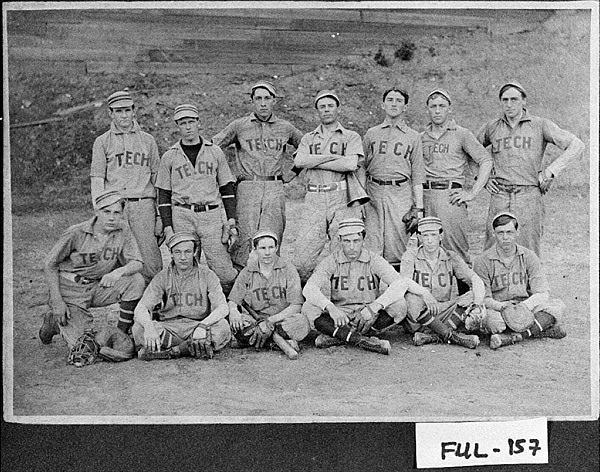
1907 Georgia Tech baseball team: Heisman in center, holding megaphone

At Georgia Tech, Heisman coached baseball and basketball in addition to football.

The 1906 Georgia Tech baseball team was his best, posting a 23–3 record. Star players in 1906 included captain and outfielder Chip Robert, shortstop Tommy McMillan, and pitchers Ed Lafitte and Craig Day. In 1907, Lafitte posted 19 strikeouts in 10 innings against rival Georgia. In 1908, Heisman was also Georgia Tech's first basketball coach. For many years after his death, from 1938 to 1956, Georgia Tech played basketball in the Heisman Gym.

In 1904, Heisman was an official in an Atlanta indoor baseball league. In 1908, Heisman became the president of the Atlanta Crackers, a minor league baseball team. The Atlanta Crackers captured the 1909 Southern Association title. Heisman also became the athletic director of the Atlanta Athletic Club in 1908, its golf course having been built in 1904.

==== Football ====
Heisman never had a losing season coaching Georgia Tech football, including three undefeated campaigns and a 32-game undefeated streak. (Note: Georgia Tech selected an "All-Heisman Era" team; in the line: Al Staton, Walker Carpenter, Bob Lang, Pup Phillips, Dummy Lebey, Bill Fincher, Jim Senter, and in the backfield: Al Hill, Joe Guyon, Everett Strupper, and Tommy Spence.) At some time during his tenure at Georgia Tech, he started the practice of posting downs and yardage on the scoreboard.

Heisman's first football season at Georgia Tech was an 8–1–1 record, the first winning season for Georgia Tech since 1893 (the 1901 team was blacklisted). One source relates: "The real feature of the season was the marvelous advance made by the Georgia School of Technology." Georgia Tech posted victories over Georgia, Tennessee, Florida State, University of Florida (at Lake City), and Cumberland, and a tie with Heisman's previous employer, Clemson. The team suffered just one loss, to Auburn. Tackle Lob Brown and halfback Billy Wilson were selected All-Southern. The same season, Dan McGugin was hired by Vanderbilt and Mike Donahue by Auburn. Vanderbilt and Auburn would dominate the SIAA until 1916, when Heisman won his first official title with Georgia Tech.

The 1905 Georgia Tech team, the first to be called "Yellow Jackets", went 6–0–1 and Heisman gained a reputation as a coaching "wizard". Heisman also drew much acclaim as a sportswriter, and was regularly published in the sports section of the Atlanta Constitution, and later in Collier's Weekly.

After the bloody 1905 football season—the Chicago Tribune reported 18 players had been killed and 159 seriously injured, United States president Theodore Roosevelt intervened and demanded the rules be reformed to make the sport safer. The rules committee then legalized the forward pass, for which Heisman was instrumental, enlisting the support of Henry L. Williams and committee members John Bell and Paul Dashiell. Heisman believed that a forward pass would improve the game by allowing a more open style of play, thus discouraging mass attack tactics and the flying wedge formation. The rule changes came in 1906, three years after Heisman began actively lobbying for that decision.

Before the 1910 season, Heisman convinced the rules committee to change football from a game of two halves to four quarters, again for safety. Despite lobbying for these rule changes, Heisman's teams from 1906 to 1914 continued to post winning records, but with multiple losses each season, including a loss to Auburn each season but 1906.

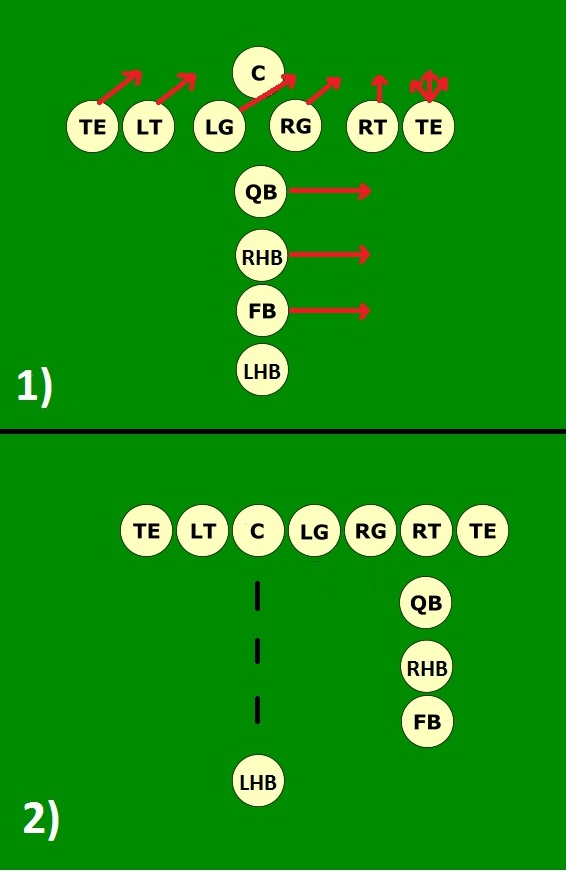
Diagram illustrating Heisman's shift formation

The 1906 Georgia Tech team beat Auburn for the first time, and in a loss to Sewanee first used Heisman's jump shift offense, which became known as the Heisman shift. In the jump shift, all but the center may shift into various formations, with a jump before the snap. A play started with only the center on the line of scrimmage. The backfield would be in a vertical line, as if in an I-formation with an extra halfback, or a giant T. After the shift, a split second elapsed, and then the ball was snapped. In one common instance of the jump shift, the line shifted to put the center between guard and tackle. The three backs nearest the line of scrimmage would shift all to one side, and the center snapped it to the tailback.

The 1907 team played its games at Ponce de Leon Park, where the Atlanta Crackers also played. The team went 4–4, and suffered Heisman's worst loss at Georgia Tech, 54–0 to Vanderbilt. "Twenty Percent" Davis, considered 20% of the team's worth, was selected All-Southern.

Chip Robert was captain of the 1908 team, which went 6–3, including a 44–0 blowout loss to Auburn in which Lew Hardage returned a kickoff 108 yards for a touchdown. Davis again was All-Southern. Georgia attacked Georgia Tech's recruitment tactics in football. Georgia alumni incited an SIAA investigation, claiming that Georgia Tech had created a fraudulent scholarship fund. The SIAA ruled in favor of Georgia Tech, but the 1908 game was canceled that season due to bad blood between the rivals. Davis was captain of the 1909 team, which won seven games, but was shutout by SIAA champion Sewanee and Auburn.

Heisman's 1910 team went 5–3, and relied on the jump shift for the first time. Hall of Famer Bob McWhorter played for the Georgia Bulldogs from 1910 to 1913, and for those seasons Georgia Tech lost to Georgia and Auburn.

In 1910, Georgia Tech was also beaten by SIAA champion Vanderbilt 22–0. Though Vanderbilt was held scoreless in the first half, Ray Morrison starred in the second half and Bradley Walker's officiating was criticized throughout. Tackle Pat Patterson was selected All-Southern. The 1911 team featured future head coach William Alexander as a reserve quarterback. Pat Patterson was team captain and selected All-Southern. The team played Alabama to a scoreless tie, after which Heisman said he had never seen a player "so thoroughly imbued with the true spirit of football as Hargrove Van de Graaff."

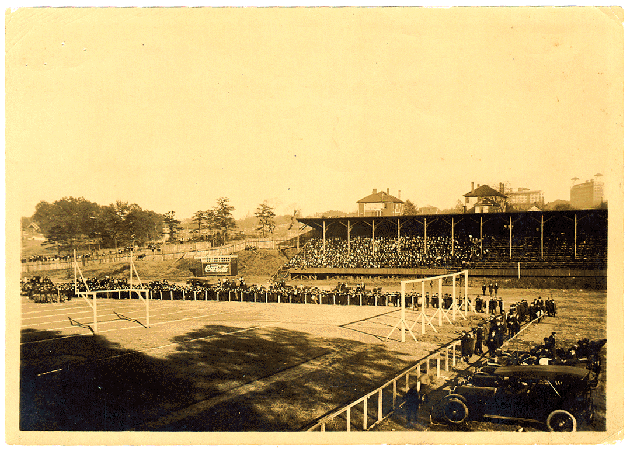
Grant Field circa 1913

The 1912 team opened the season by playing the Army's 11th Cavalry regiment to a scoreless tie. The team also lost to Sewanee, and quarterback Alf McDonald was selected All-Southern. The team moved to Grant Field from Ponce de Leon Park by 1913, and lost its first game there to Georgia 14–0. The season's toughest win came against Florida, 13–3, after Florida was up 3–0 at the half. Heisman said his opponents played the best football he had seen a Florida squad play.

The independent 1914 team was captained by halfback Wooch Fielder and went 6–2. The team beat Mercer 105–0 and the next week had a 13–0 upset loss to Alabama. End Jim Senter and halfback J. S. Patton were selected All-Southern.

During the span of 1915 to 1918, Georgia Tech posted a 30–1–2 record, outscored opponents 1611–93, and claimed four straight SIAA titles.

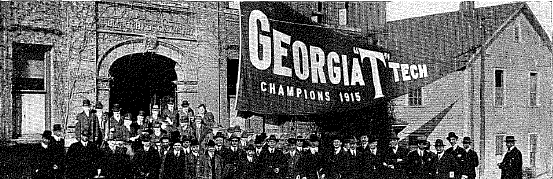
The pennant at the annual banquet for the 1915 team

The 1915 team went 7–0–1 and claimed a shared SIAA title with Vanderbilt, despite being officially independent. The tie came against rival Georgia, in inches of mud. Georgia center John G. Henderson headed a group of three men, one behind the other, with his hands upon the shoulders of the one in front, to counter Heisman's jump shift.

Halfback Everett Strupper joined the team in 1915 and was partially deaf. He called the signals instead of the quarterback. When Strupper tried out for the team, he noticed that the quarterback shouted the signals every time he was to carry the ball. Realizing that the loud signals would be a tip-off to the opposition, Strupper told Heisman: "Coach, those loud signals are absolutely unnecessary. You see when sickness in my kid days brought on this deafness my folks gave me the best instructors obtainable to teach me lip-reading." Heisman recalled how Strupper overcame his deafness: "He couldn't hear anything but a regular shout, but he could read your lips like a flash. No lad who ever stepped on a football field had keener eyes than Everett had. The enemy found this out the minute he began looking for openings through which to run the ball."

Fielder and guard Bob Lang made the composite All-Southern team, and Senter, quarterback Froggie Morrison, and Strupper were selected All-Southern by some writer. The team was immediately dubbed the greatest in Georgia Tech's history up to that point. However, the team continued to improve over the next two seasons. Sportswriter Morgan Blake called Strupper, "probably the greatest running half-back the South has known."

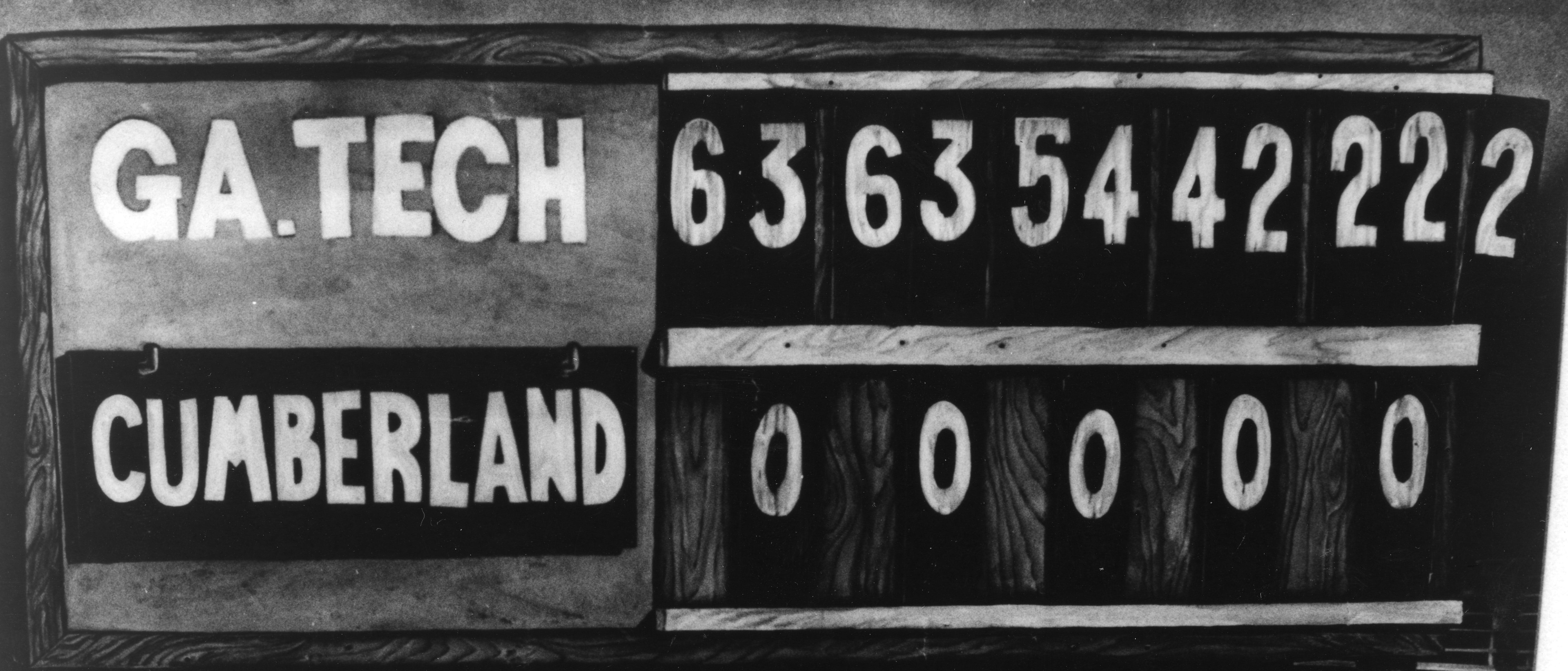
The 1916 scoreboard, showing football's worst blowout

The 1916 team went 8–0–1, captured the team's first official SIAA title, and was the first to vault Georgia Tech football to national prominence. According to one writer, it "seemed to personify Heisman" by playing hard in every game on both offense and defense. Strupper, Lang, fullback Tommy Spence, tackle Walker Carpenter, and center Pup Phillips were all selected All-Southern. Only one newspaper in all of the South was said to have neglected to have Strupper on its All-Southern team. Phillips was the first Georgia Tech center selected All-Southern, and made Walter Camp's third-team All-American. Spence got Camp's honorable mention.

Without throwing a single forward pass, Georgia Tech defeated the Cumberland College Bulldogs, 222–0, in the most one-sided college football game ever played. Strupper led the scoring with six touchdowns. Sportswriter Grantland Rice wrote, "Cumberland's greatest individual play of the game occurred when fullback Allen circled right end for a 6-yard loss."

Up 126–0 at halftime, Heisman reportedly told his players, "You're doing all right, team, we're ahead, but you just can't tell what those Cumberland players have up their sleeves. They may spring a surprise. Be alert, men! Hit 'em clean, but hit 'em hard!" However, even Heisman relented, and shortened the quarters in the second half to 12 minutes each instead of 15.

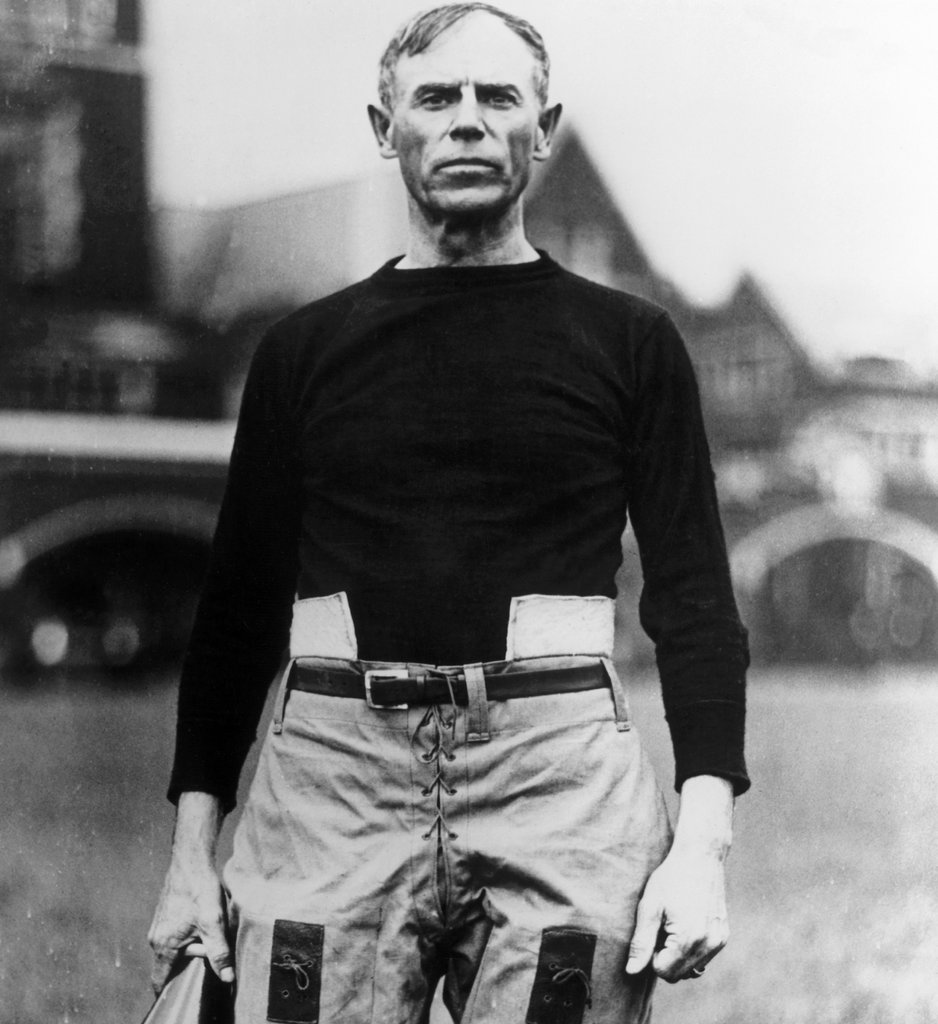
Heisman, circa 1917, in front of Clemson's Bowman Field

Heisman's running up the score against his outmanned opponent was motivated by revenge against Cumberland's baseball team, for running up the score against Georgia Tech 22–0 with a team primarily composed of professional Nashville Vols players, and against the sportswriters who he felt were too focused on numbers, such as those who picked Vanderbilt as champion the previous season.

In 1917, the backfield of Joe Guyon, Al Hill, Judy Harlan, and Strupper helped propel Heisman to his finest success. Georgia Tech posted a 9–0 record and a national championship, the first for a Southern team. For many years, it was considered the finest team the South ever produced. Sportswriter Frank G. Menke selected Strupper and team captain Carpenter for his All-America team; the first two players from the Deep South ever selected first-team All-American.

Joe Guyon was a Chippewa Indian, who had transferred from Carlisle, and whose brother Charles "Wahoo" Guyon was Heisman's assistant coach on the team. Judy Harlan said about Guyon, "Once in a while the Indian would come out in Joe, such as the nights Heisman gave us a white football and had us working out under the lights. That's when Guyon would give out the blood-curdling war whoops." His first carry for Georgia Tech was a 75-yard touchdown against Wake Forest.

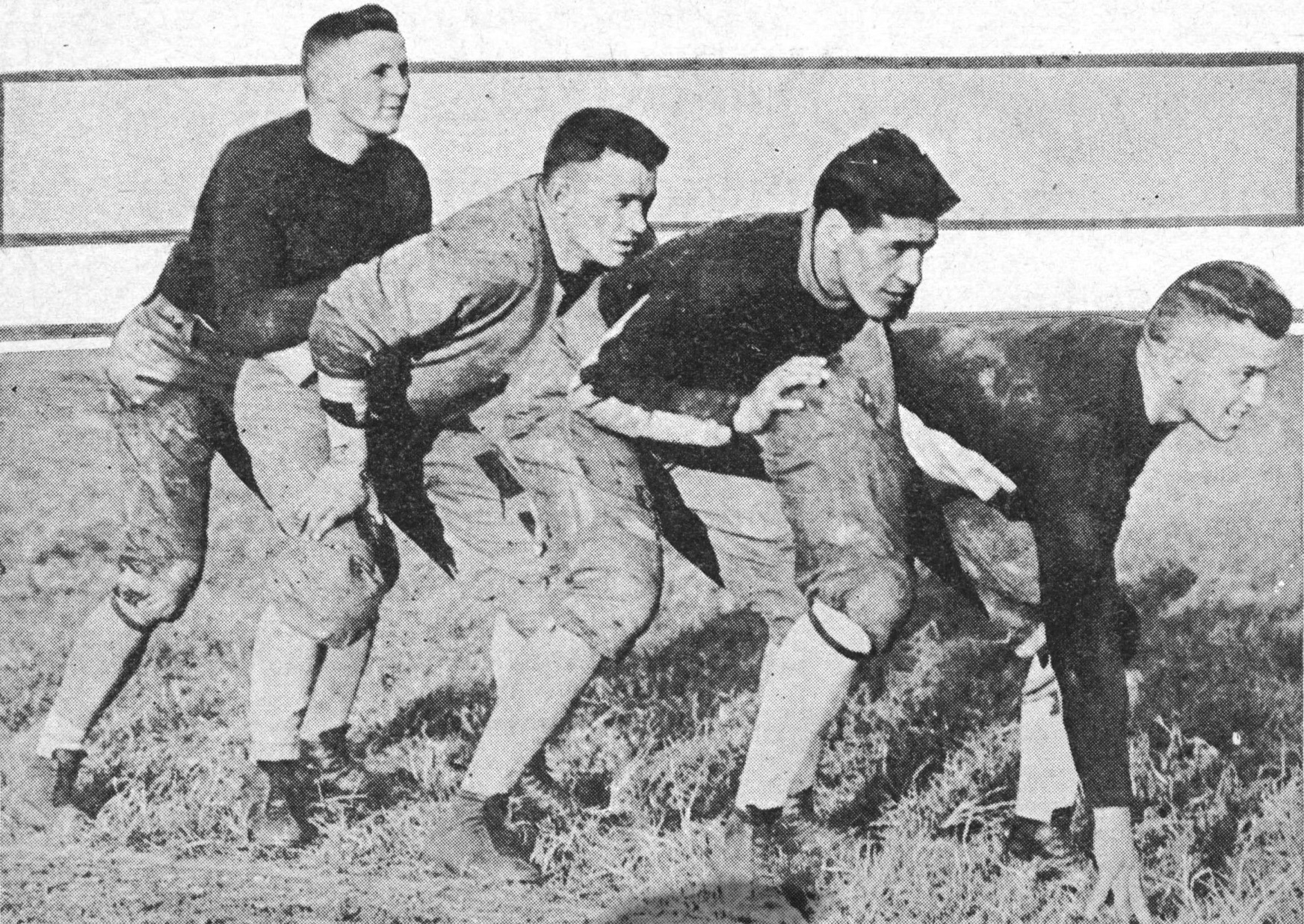
The 1917 Georgia Tech backfield

The 1917 Georgia Tech team outscored opponents 491–17 and beat Penn 41–0. Historian Bernie McCarty called it "Strupper's finest hour, coming through against powerful Penn in the contest that shocked the East." Pop Warner's undefeated Pittsburgh team beat Penn just 14–6. Georgia Tech's 83–0 victory over Vanderbilt is the worst loss in Vanderbilt history, and the 63–0 defeat of Washington and Lee was the worst loss in W&L history at the time. In the 48–0 defeat of Tulane, each of the four members of the backfield eclipsed 100 yards rushing, and Guyon also passed for two touchdowns. Auburn, the SIAA's second place team, was beaten 68–7.

Institute faculty succeeded in preventing a postseason national championship game with Pittsburgh. In the next season of 1918, after losing several players to World War I, Georgia Tech lost a lopsided game to Pittsburgh 32–0. Sportswriter Francis J. Powers wrote:

At Forbes Field, the dressing rooms of the two teams were separated only by a thin wall. As the Panthers were sitting around, awaiting Warner's pregame talk, Heisman began to orate in the adjoining room. In his charge to the Tech squad, Heisman became flowery and fiery. He brought the heroes of ancient Greece and the soldier dead in his armor among the ruins of Pompeii. It was terrific and the Panthers sat, spellbound. When Heisman had finished, Warner chortled and quietly said to his players: 'Okay, boys. There's the speech. Now go out and knock them off.'

Heisman cut back on his expanded duties in 1918, and only coached football between September 1 and December 15. Georgia Tech went 6–1 and eclipsed 100 points three different times. Buck Flowers, a small back in his first year on the team, had transferred from Davidson a year before, where he had starred in a game against Georgia Tech. Flowers had grown to weigh 150 pounds and was a backup until Heisman discovered his ability as an open-field runner on punt returns.

Also in 1918, center Bum Day became the first player from the South selected for Walter Camp's first-team All-America, historically loaded with college players from Harvard, Yale, Princeton, and other northeastern colleges. Flowers and tackle Bill Fincher made Camp's second team. Guyon made Menke's first team All-America as a tackle.

The 1919 team was beaten by Pittsburgh and Washington and Lee, and in the final game Auburn gave Georgia Tech its first loss to an SIAA school in 5 years (since Auburn in 1914). Flowers, Harlan, Fincher, Phillips, Dummy Lebey, Al Staton, and Shorty Guill were All-Southern. Heisman left Atlanta after the season, and William Alexander was hired as his successor.

=== Penn and Washington & Jefferson ===
Portrait of Heisman in his mid-fifties at Rice University

Heisman went back to Penn for three seasons from 1920 to 1922. Most notable perhaps is the 9–7 loss to Alabama in 1922, the Crimson Tide's first major intersectional victory. In 1923, Heisman coached the Washington and Jefferson Presidents, which beat the previously undefeated West Virginia Mountaineers.

=== Rice ===
Following the season at Washington and Jefferson College, Heisman ended his coaching career with four seasons at Rice. In 1924, after being selected by the Committee on Outdoor Sports, he took over the job as Rice University's first full-time head football coach and athletic director, succeeding Phillip Arbuckle. His teams saw little success, and he earned more than any faculty member.

Rice was his last coaching job before he retired in 1927 to lead the Downtown Athletic Club in Manhattan, New York. In 1935, the Downtown Athletic Club began awarding a Downtown Athletic Club trophy for the best football player east of the Mississippi River.

== Personal life ==
Heisman met his first wife, an actress, while he was participating in theater during his time at Clemson. Evelyn McCollum Cox, whose stage name was Evelyn Barksdale, was a widow with a single child, a 12-year-old boy named Carlisle. They married during the 1903 season, on October 24, 1903, a day after Heisman's 34th birthday. While in Atlanta, Heisman also shared the house with the family poodle named Woo. He would feed the dog ice cream.

In 1918, Heisman and his wife divorced, and to prevent any social embarrassment to his former wife, who chose to remain in the city, he left Atlanta after the 1919 football season. Carlisle and Heisman would remain close.

Heisman met Edith Maora Cole, a student at Buchtel College, where he was coaching football during the 1893 and 1894 seasons. The two were close, but decided not to marry due to Edith's problems with tuberculosis. When they met again in 1924, Heisman was living in Washington, Pennsylvania, and coaching at Washington and Jefferson College. This time, they did decide to marry, doing it that same year, right before Heisman left Pennsylvania to take his last head coaching job at Rice University in Texas.

== Heisman as an actor ==
Heisman considered himself an actor as well as coach, and was a part of several acting troupes in the offseason. He was known for delivering grand theatrical speeches to inspire his players, and some considered him to be an eccentric and melodramatic. He was described as exhibiting "the temperament, panache, and audacity of the showman."

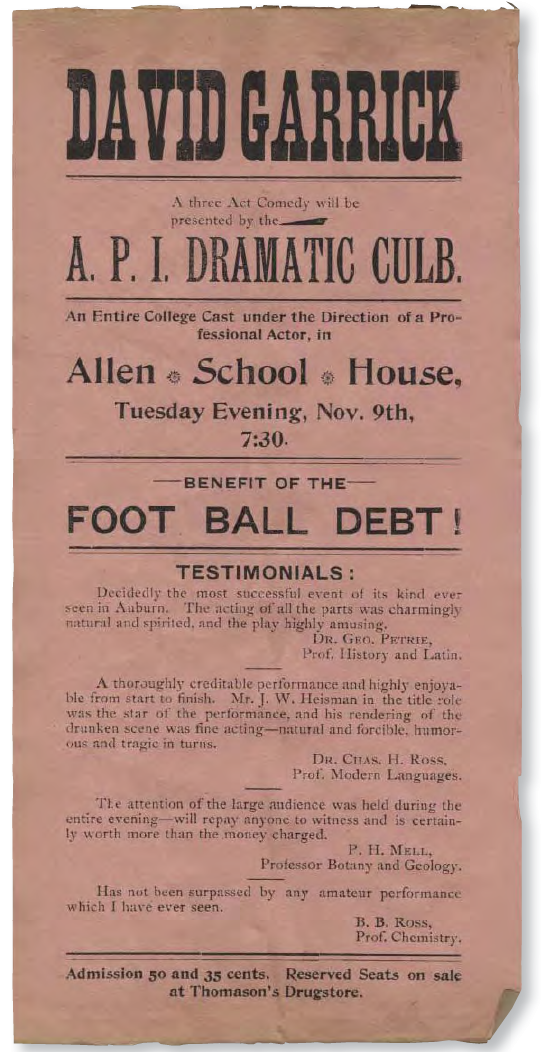
Poster for the play David Garrick, produced and acted in by Heisman, Alabama Polytechnic Institute (Auburn) 1897

His 1897 Auburn team finished $700 in debt. To raise money for next season, Heisman created the Alabama Polytechnic Institute (Auburn) Dramatic Club to stage and act as the main character in the comic play David Garrick by Thomas William Robertson. George Petrie described the play as "decidedly the most successful event of its kind ever seen in Auburn". A local newspaper, The Opelika Post, reviewed Heisman's performance:

He was naturalness itself, and there was not a single place in which he overdid his part. His changes from drunk to sober and back again in the drunken scene were skillfully done, and the humor of many of his speeches caused a roar of laughter. He acted not like an amateur, but like the skilled professional that he is.

During his time at Auburn, Heisman also took on more serious roles, and was considered as a refined elocutionist when performing Shakespearean plays or reciting his monologues. The next year, the API Dramatic Club performed A Scrap of Paper by Victorien Sardou. In May 1898, Heisman appeared in Diplomacy, an English adaptation of Dora by Sardou, with the Mordaunt-Block Stock Company at the Herald Square Theater on Broadway. Later that summer, he performed in The Ragged Regiment by Robert Neilson Stephens at the Herald Square Theater and Caste at the Columbus Theater in Harlem.

In 1899, he was in the Macdonald Stock Company, which performed at Crump's Park in Macon, Georgia, including the role of Dentatus in Virginius by James Sheridan Knowles. When the Macdonald Stock Company took a hiatus in June 1899, Heisman joined the Thanouser-Hatch Company of Atlanta. He performed in at least two plays for this company, in Brother John by Martha Morton at the Grand Theater in Atlanta, playing the role of Captain Van Sprague.

At the end of Auburn's 1899 season, a public conflict developed between Heisman and umpire W. L. Taylor. Heisman wrote to the Birmingham Age-Herald complaining about Taylor's officiating in general and specifically his cancellation of an Auburn touchdown because the scoring play began before the starting whistle following a time out. In his published reply, Taylor critiqued Heisman as someone with "histrionic gifts," making "lurid appeals," and seeking "peanut gallery applause" for "heroically acted character parts" in some "cheap theater." Heisman responded to that characterization as "The heinous crime I shall neither attempt to palliate nor deny" and that what Taylor said could be a "studied insult to the whole art of acting."

In 1900, Heisman joined the Spooner Dramatic Company of Tampa, Florida. On return from Key West, Heisman got very seasick. By 1901, Heisman joined the Dixie Stock Company, which performed several plays in the Dukate Theater at Biloxi, Mississippi. There, he received his first major romantic lead, Armand in Camille. In 1902, he managed Crump's Park Stock Company. He started the Heisman Dramatic Stock Company while at Clemson in 1903, which spent much of the summer performing at Riverside Park in Asheville, North Carolina. By 1904, Heisman operated the Heisman Stock Company. It performed at the Casino Theater at Pickett Springs Resort in Montgomery, Alabama. Their first performance was William Gillette's Because She Loved Him So. The next summer opened with a performance at the Grand Opera House in Augusta, Georgia. In 1906 and 1907, Heisman again performed in Crump's Park in Macon, as well as the Thunderbolt Casino in Savannah. In 1906, he purchased an Edison kinetograph for his audiences. By 1908, Heisman managed Heisman Theatrical Enterprises.

== Death and legacy ==
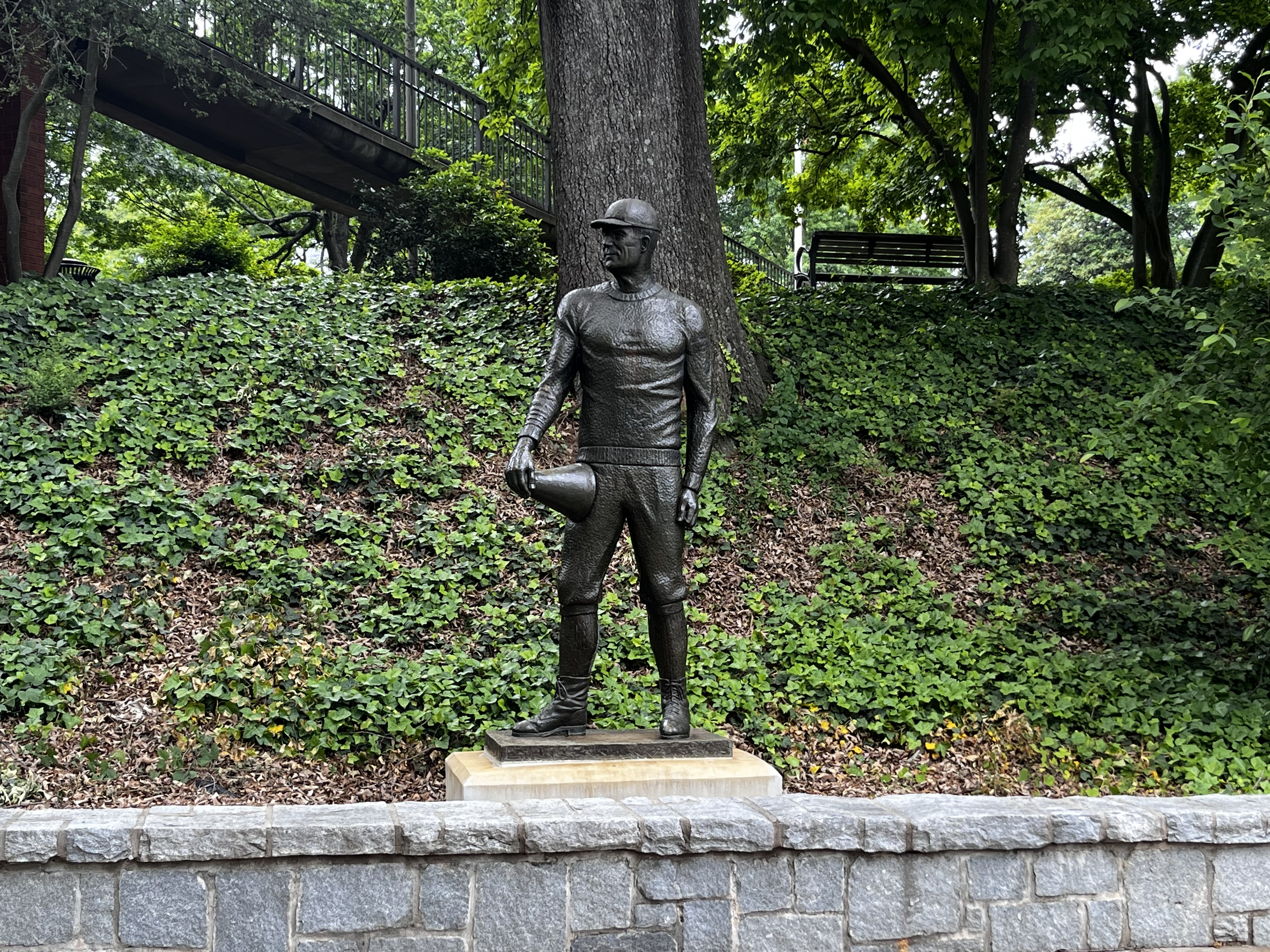
Heisman statue at Georgia Tech.

Heisman died of pneumonia on October 3, 1936, in New York City. Three days later, his body was taken by train to his wife's hometown of Rhinelander, Wisconsin, where he was buried in Grave D, Lot 11, Block 3 of the city-owned Forest Home Cemetery. When Heisman died, he was preparing to write a history of football.

=== Legacy ===
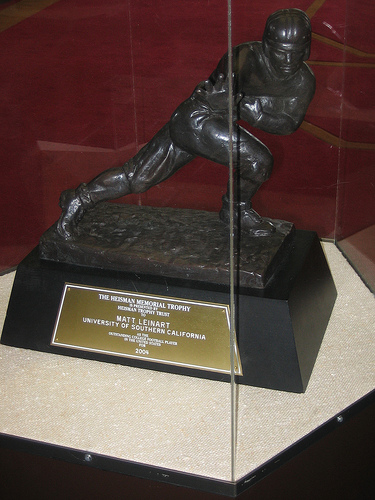
A Heisman Trophy

Heisman was inducted into the College Football Hall of Fame as a coach in 1954, a member of the second class of inductees. Heisman was an innovator and "master strategist". He developed one of the first shifts. He was a proponent of the legalization of the forward pass. He had both his guards pull to lead an end run and had his center snap the ball. He invented the hidden ball play, and originated the "hike" or "hep" shouted by the quarterback to start each play. He led the effort to cut the game from halves to quarters. He is credited with the idea of listing downs and yardage on the scoreboard, and of putting his quarterback at safety on defense.

On December 10, 1936, just two months after Heisman's death on October 3, the Downtown Athletic Club trophy was renamed the Heisman Memorial Trophy, and is now given to the player voted as the season's most outstanding collegiate football player. Voters for this award consist primarily of media representatives, who are allocated by regions across the country to filter out possible regional bias, and former recipients. Following the bankruptcy of the Downtown Athletic Club in 2002, the award is now given out by the Heisman Trust.

Georgia Tech's basketball team played in Heisman Gym which was named in his honor when it opened in 1938. Located behind the north stands of Grant Field, the gym was the home of Tech basketball until 1956, when the team moved into Alexander Memorial Coliseum. The facility also had a pool, which was used by the Tech swim team, and an Auditorium. After the basketball team left, the gym was used for swimming until 1977, and as an auditorium until the Ferst Center For The Arts opened in 1992. The gym was demolished in 1995. Heisman Street on Clemson's campus is named in his honor. Heisman Drive, located directly south of Jordan–Hare Stadium on the Auburn University campus, is named in his honor, as well. A bust of him is also in Jordan–Hare Stadium. A wooden statue of Heisman was placed at the Rhinelander–Oneida County Airport. A bronze statue of him was placed on Akron's campus, and one is located directly north of Bobby Dodd Stadium on the main campus of the Georgia Institute of Technology. Heisman has also been the subject of a musical.

==== Coaching tree ====
Heisman's coaching tree includes:

1. William Alexander: played for Georgia Tech (1911–1912), head coach for Georgia Tech (1920–1944)
2. Tom Davies: assistant for Penn (1922), head coach for Geneva (1923), Allegheny (1924–1925), Western Reserve (1941–1947).
3. Frank Dobson: assistant for Georgia Tech (1907), head coach for Georgia (1909), Clemson (1910–1912), Richmond (1913–1917; 1919–1933), South Carolina (1918), and Maryland (1936–1939).
4. C. K. Fauver, played for Oberlin (1892–1895), head coach for Miami (OH) (1895), Oberlin (1896).
5. Bill Fincher: played for Georgia Tech (1916–1920), head coach for William & Mary (1921), assistant for Georgia Tech (1925–1931)
6. Jack Forsythe: played for Clemson (1901–1903), head coach for Florida State College (1904), Florida (1906)
7. Joe Guyon: played for Georgia Tech (1916–1917), head coach for Union College (1919; 1923–1927)
8. Jerry Gwin: played for Auburn (1899), head coach for Mississippi A&M (1902).
9. Mike Harvey: played for Auburn (1898–1900), head coach for Alabama (1901), Auburn (1902), and Mississippi (1903–1904).
10. Daniel S. Martin: played for Auburn (1898–1901), head coach for Mississippi (1902) and Mississippi A&M (1903–1906).
11. Jonathan K. Miller: played for Penn (1920–1922), head coach for Franklin & Marshall (1928–1930).
12. John Penton, played for Auburn (1897): head coach for Clemson (1898).
13. Pup Phillips: played for Georgia Tech (1916–1917; 1919), head coach for University School for Boys (1923)
14. Hope Sadler: played for Clemson (1902–1903), head coach for University School for Boys (1904).
15. Vedder Sitton: played for Clemson (1901–1903), head baseball coach for Clemson (1915–1916).
16. Billy Watkins, who replaced Heisman at Auburn (1900), "an old pupil of Heisman's".
17. Carl S. Williams: played for Oberlin (1891–1892) and Penn (1893–1895), head coach for Penn (1902–1907).
18. Billy Williams: played for Auburn (1894–1896), head coach for Clemson (1897).

== Head coaching record ==
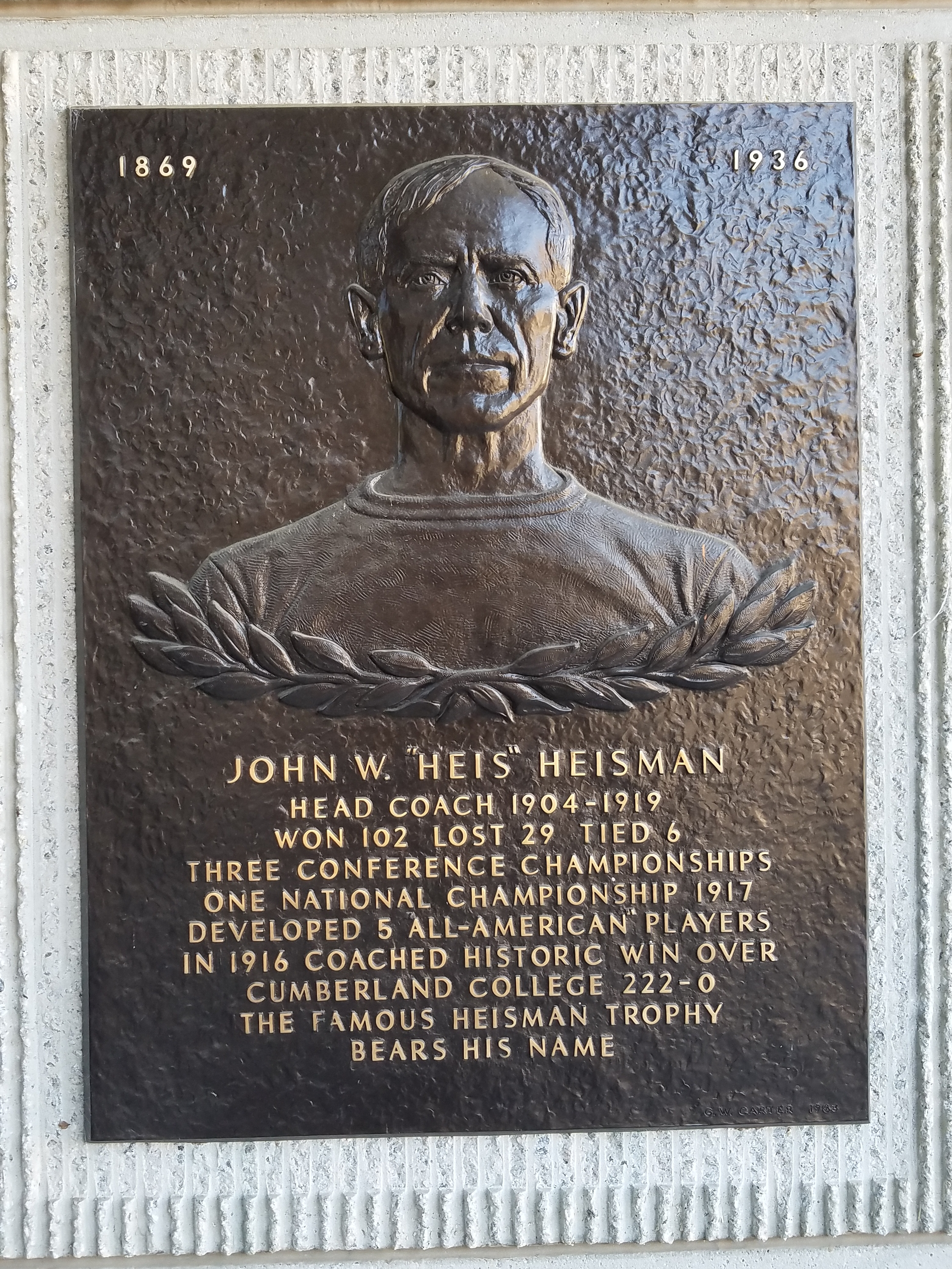
Plaque recognizing Heisman's football accomplishments at Tech

=== Football ===
Year	Team	Overall	Conference	Standing
Oberlin Yeomen (Independent) (1892)
1892	Oberlin	7–0		
Buchtel (Independent) (1893–1894)
1893	Buchtel	5–2		
1894	Buchtel	1–0		
Buchtel:		6–2		
Oberlin Yeomen (Independent) (1894)
1894	Oberlin	4–3–1		
Oberlin:		11–3–1		
Auburn Tigers (Southern Intercollegiate Athletic Association) (1895–1899)
1895	Auburn	2–1	2–1	3rd
1896	Auburn	3–1	3–1	4th
1897	Auburn	2–0–1	2–0–1	3rd
1898	Auburn	2–1	2–1	4th
1899	Auburn	3–1–1	2–1–1	6th
Auburn:		12–4–2	11–4–2	
Clemson Tigers (Southern Intercollegiate Athletic Association) (1900–1903)
1900	Clemson	6–0	2–0	1st
1901	Clemson	3–1–1	2–0–1	2nd
1902	Clemson	6–1	5–0	1st
1903	Clemson	4–1–1	2–0–1	T–1st
Clemson:		19–3–2	11–0–2	
Georgia Tech Yellow Jackets (Southern Intercollegiate Athletic Association) (1904–1913)
1904	Georgia Tech	8–1–1	2–1–1	6th
1905	Georgia Tech	6–0–1	4–0–1	2nd
1906	Georgia Tech	5–3–1	3–3	8th
1907	Georgia Tech	4–4	2–4	10th
1908	Georgia Tech	6–3	5–3	6th
1909	Georgia Tech	7–2	5–2	5th
1910	Georgia Tech	5–3	3–3	11th
1911	Georgia Tech	6–2–1	5–2–1	5th
1912	Georgia Tech	5–3–1	5–3	5th
1913	Georgia Tech	7–2	5–2	4th
Georgia Tech Yellow Jackets (Independent) (1914–1915)
1914	Georgia Tech	6–2		
1915	Georgia Tech	7–0–1		T–1st†
Georgia Tech Yellow Jackets / Golden Tornado (Southern Intercollegiate Athletic Association) (1916–1919)
1916	Georgia Tech	8–0–1	4–0–1	T–1st
1917	Georgia Tech	9–0	4–0	1st
1918	Georgia Tech	6–1	3–0	1st
1919	Georgia Tech	7–3	3–1	4th
Georgia Tech:		102–29–7	53–24–4	
Penn Quakers (Independent) (1920–1922)
1920	Penn	6–4		
1921	Penn	4–3–2		
1922	Penn	6–3		
Penn:		16–10–2		
Washington & Jefferson Presidents (Independent) (1923)
1923	Washington & Jefferson	6–1–1		
Washington & Jefferson:		6–1–1		
Rice Owls (Southwest Conference / Texas Intercollegiate Athletic Association) (1924–1927)
1924	Rice	4–4	2–2 / 2–1	T–3rd / T–3rd
Rice Owls (Southwest Conference) (1925–1927)
1925	Rice	4–4–1	1–2–1	5th
1926	Rice	4–4–1	0–4	7th
1927	Rice	2–6–1	1–3	6th
Rice:		14–18–3	6–12–1	
Total:		186–70–18		
National championship Conference title Conference division title or championship game berth

† While officially independent, Georgia Tech claimed an SIAA title in 1915.

=== Baseball ===
Record table
Season	Team	Overall	Conference	Standing	Postseason
Buchtel (Independent) (1894)
1894	Buchtel	8–5			
Buchtel:		8–5 (.615)			
Clemson Tigers (Southern Intercollegiate Athletic Association) (1901–1903)
1901	Clemson	10–2–1	3–1–1		
1902	Clemson	9–3	1–2		
1903	Clemson	9–1	4–0		
Clemson:		28–6–1 (.814)	8–3–1 (.708)		
Georgia Tech Yellow Jackets (Southern Intercollegiate Athletic Association) (1904–1917)
1904	Georgia Tech	15–7	9–6		
1905	Georgia Tech	13–4	7–4		
1906	Georgia Tech	23–3	16–2	1st	
1907	Georgia Tech	10–5–1	10–5–1		
1908	Georgia Tech	9–12	7–10		
1909	Georgia Tech	13–8–1	7–7–1		
1910	Georgia Tech	11–5–1	11–5–1		
1911	Georgia Tech	7–6	6–5		
1912	Georgia Tech	8–10	8–9		
1913	Georgia Tech	9–8	9–7		
1914	Georgia Tech	12–8	10–8		
1915	Georgia Tech	7–8–2	6–7–2		
1916	Georgia Tech	14–6	11–5		
1917	Georgia Tech	12–7	6–6		
Georgia Tech:		163–97–5 (.625))	123–86–5 (.586)		
Total:		199–108–7 (.645)			
National champion Postseason invitational champion Conference regular season champion Conference regular season and conference tournament champion Division regular season champion Division regular season and conference tournament champion Conference tournament champion

=== Basketball ===
Record table
Season	Team	Overall	Conference	Standing	Postseason
Georgia Tech Yellow Jackets (Southern Intercollegiate Athletic Association) (1908–1909)
1908–09	Georgia Tech	1–6	1–5		
Georgia Tech Yellow Jackets (Southern Intercollegiate Athletic Association) (1912–1914)
1912–13	Georgia Tech	2–6	2–6		
1913–14	Georgia Tech	6–2	5–2		
Georgia Tech:		8–8 (.500)	7–8 (.467)		
Total:		9–14 (.391)			

== Bibliography ==
- Auburn University (2009). 2009 Auburn Football Media Guide (PDF). Auburn, Alabama: Auburn Media Relations Office. Archived from the original (PDF) on October 6, 2014.
- Blackman, Sam (2001). Clemson: Where the Tigers Play. Sports Publishing LLC. ISBN 9781582613697.
- Blackman, Sam (2016). If These Walls Could Talk. Triumph Books. ISBN 9781633196896 – via Google Books.
- Brandt, Nat (2001). When Oberlin was King of the Gridiron: The Heisman Years. Kent State University Press. ISBN 978-0-87338-684-5.
- Buchtel College Alumni Association (1922). Fifty Years of Buchtel (1870-1920). Akron, O.
- Campbell, Jim (1999). "John Heisman The Man, Not The Trophy" (PDF). College Football Historical Society Newsletter. 12. Archived from the original (PDF) on May 13, 2016.
- Clemson University (2016). 2016 Clemson Baseball Media Guide. Clemson Athletics.
- Clemson University (2016). 2016 Football Media Guide (PDF). Clemson Athletics. Archived from the original (PDF) on December 20, 2016.
- Georgia Institute of Technology (2010). 2010 Georgia Tech Baseball Media Guide.
- Georgia Institute of Technology (2009). 2009–10 Georgia Tech Men's Basketball Media Guide.
- Georgia Institute of Technology (2008). Records. Archived from the original on September 24, 2015.
- Haney, Travis (2011). Classic Clashes of the Carolina-Clemson Football Rivalry. Arcadia. ISBN 9781614233152.
- Heisman, John M. (2012). Heisman: The Man Behind the Trophy. With Mark Schlaback. Simon and Schuster. ISBN 978-1-4516-8291-5.
- Heisman, John (1922). Principles of Football.
- Kordic, Gregory (2007). A Damn Good Yankee: Xen Scott and the Rise of the Crimson Tide. Bloomington, Indiana: AuthorHouse. ISBN 978-1-4259-6018-6.
- Langum, David J. (2010). From Maverick to Mainstream: Cumberland School of Law, 1847-1997. University of Georgia Press. ISBN 9780820336183.
- Magee, Mary (2012). Red, Third Edition. Beyond Football: The Legacy of Coach Jimmy 'Red' Parker. Tate Publishing & Enterprises. ISBN 978-1-62024-962-8.
- McCarty, Bernie (February 1988). "Georgia Tech's 1917 backfield, better than the Four Horsemen: Part 1" (PDF). College Football Historical Society Newsletter. 1 (3). Archived from the original (PDF) on March 4, 2016.
- McCarty, Bernie (May 1988). "Georgia Tech's 1917 backfield, better than the Four Horsemen: Part 2" (PDF). College Football Historical Society Newsletter. 1 (4). Archived from the original (PDF) on March 4, 2016.
- McMath, Robert C.; Ronald H. Bayor; James E. Brittain; Lawrence Foster; August W. Giebelhaus; Germaine M. Reed (1985). Engineering the New South: Georgia Tech 1885–1985. University of Georgia Press. ISBN 978-0-8203-0784-8.
- Oberlin College (2008). "2008 Oberlin College Football Media Guide" (PDF).
- Pennington, Bill (2009). The Heisman: Great American Stories of the Men Who Won. Harper Collins. ISBN 9780061746628.
- Pope, Edwin (1955). Football's Greatest Coaches – via archive.org.
- Powers, Francis J. (1969). Life Story of Glen S. (Pop) Warner, Gridiron's Greatest Strategist. Chicago, IL: The Athletic Institute.
- Rielly, Edward J. (2009). Football: An Encyclopedia of Popular Culture. U of Nebraska Press. p. 163. ISBN 978-0-8032-2630-2.
- Riley, Helene M. (2002). Clemson University. Arcadia. ISBN 9780738514703.
- Roberts, Jerry (2016). Pass Receiving In Early Pro Football. McFarland. ISBN 9781476622286.
- Schafer, Elizabeth D. (2004). Auburn Football. Arcadia Publishing. ISBN 978-0-7385-1669-1.
- Thorn, John (2016). Baseball: A Journal of the Early Game. Vol. 9. McFarland. ISBN 9781476621395.
- Triumph Books (2006). Echoes of Georgia Football: The Greatest Stories Ever Told. Triumph Books. ISBN 9781617490484.
- Umphlett, Wiley Lee (1992). Creating the Big Game: John W. Heisman and the Invention of American Football. Greenwood Publishing Group. p. 37. ISBN 978-0-313-28404-5.
- Department of English, University of South Carolina (1979). Names In South Carolina. Vol. 26.
- Van Brimmer, Adam (2011). 100 Things Yellow Jackets Fans Should Know and Do Before They Die. Chicago: Triumph Books. ISBN 978-1-61749-703-2.
- Wiggins, Robert (2009). The Federal League of Base Ball Clubs: The History of an Outlaw Major League. McFarland. ISBN 9780786438358.
- Woodbery, Evan (2012). 100 Things Auburn Fans Should Know and Do Before They Die. Triumph Books. ISBN 978-1-62368-073-2.
- Woodruff, Fuzzy (1928). A History of Southern Football 1890–1928. Vol. 1.
- Woodruff, Fuzzy (1928). A History of Southern Football 1890–1928. Vol. 2.
- Woodruff, Fuzzy (1928). A History of Southern Football 1890–1928. Vol. 3.
