= 1895 Georgia vs. North Carolina football game =

- Featured the first forward pass
Georgia Bulldogs	North Carolina Tar Heels
(1–0)	(1–0)
0	6
Head coach: Pop Warner	Head coach: Thomas Trenchard
	1	2	Total
Georgia	0	0	0
North Carolina	6	0	6
- Date: October 26, 1895
- Season: 1895
- Location: Atlanta, Georgia
- Attendance: 1,500

The 1895 Georgia vs. North Carolina football game, played October 26, 1895, was a college football game between the Georgia Bulldogs and North Carolina Tar Heels. The game features what some claim is the first (legal or otherwise; the legal pass starts in 1906) forward pass. This was also the first season of the newly formed Southern Intercollegiate Athletic Association.

== Game notes ==
Bob Quincy noted in his 1973 book They Made the Bell Tower Chime:

John Heisman, a noted historian, wrote 30 years later that, indeed, the Tar Heels had given birth to the forward pass against the Bulldogs (UGA). It was conceived to break a scoreless deadlock and give UNC a 6–0 win. The Carolinians were in a punting situation and a Georgia rush seemed destined to block the ball. The punter, with an impromptu dash to his right, tossed the ball and it was caught by George Stephens, who ran 70 yards for a touchdown.

The ball was thrown out of desperation by back Joel Whitaker.

Georgia coach Pop Warner complained to the referee that the play was illegal, but the referee let the play stand because he did not see the pass. Only four minutes of game time had passed when Stephens scored.

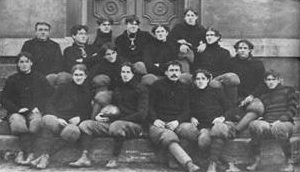
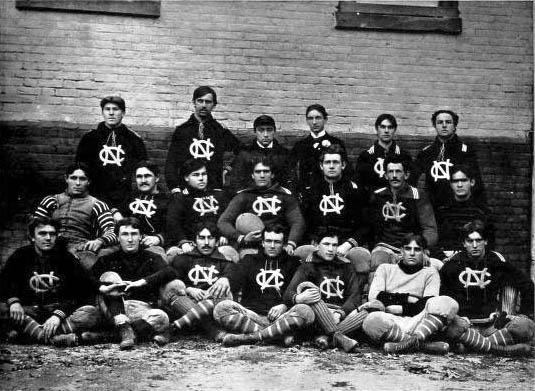
Teams of Georgia (left) and North Carolina in 1895

== Aftermath ==
Five days later, the teams played a second time and North Carolina won 10 to 6.
