= Francis Powers =

Francis Powers may refer to:

- Francis Powers (actor) (1865–1940), American silent film actor, writer, and director
- Francis Gary Powers (1929–1977), American U-2 spy plane pilot
- Francis J. Powers (1895–1977), American sportswriter
- Buddy Powers, collegiate ice hockey player and coach
- Francis Fisher Powers, 19th century singing teacher of Ernest Trow Carter
- Francis Powers Starkie, father of W. J. M. Starkie
