= 1895 Southern Intercollegiate Athletic Association football season =

- League: NCAA
- Sport: College football
- Duration: October 12, 1895 through November 28, 1895
- Teams: 5

Regular Season
- Season champions: None

Football seasons
- 1896 →

1895 Southern Intercollegiate Athletic Association football standings
	Conf.					Overall
Team	W		L		T	W		L		T
Vanderbilt	3	–	0	–	0	5	–	3	–	1
Auburn	2	–	1	–	0	2	–	1	–	0
Georgia	2	–	2	–	0	3	–	4	–	0
Sewanee	0	–	2	–	0	2	–	2	–	1
Alabama	0	–	2	–	0	0	–	4	–	0

The inaugural 1895 Southern Intercollegiate Athletic Association football season was the college football games played by the member schools of the Southern Intercollegiate Athletic Association as part of the 1895 college football season. The association's inaugural season began on October 12, 1895. The first conference game was played on October 26 with North Carolina at Georgia, featuring what some claim is the first forward pass. (Note: This began a 6 day, 4 conference game road trip in which North Carolina posted a 3–0–1 record)

The SIAA was founded on December 21, 1894, by Dr. William Dudley, a chemistry professor at Vanderbilt. The conference was originally formed for "the development and purification of college athletics throughout the South".

The Southern Intercollegiate Athletic Association (S. I. A. A.) was one of the first collegiate athletic conferences in the United States. Twenty-seven of the current Division I FBS (formerly Division I-A) football programs were members of this conference at some point, as were at least 19 other schools. Every member of the current Southeastern Conference except Arkansas and Missouri, as well as six of the 15 current members of the Atlantic Coast Conference plus the University of Texas at Austin, now of the Big 12 Conference (and previously of the now defunct Southwest Conference), formerly held membership in the SIAA.

No conference members claimed a championship. Some publications dubbed North Carolina the SIAA champions for racking up a 3–0–1 road trip against SIAA opponents. Fuzzy Woodruff said Vanderbilt was the undisputed southeastern champion, but Virginia held preeminence in the entire South.

== Regular season ==
Index to colors and formatting
Non-conference matchup; SIAA member won
Non-conference matchup; SIAA member lost
Non-conference matchup; tie
Conference matchup

SIAA teams in bold.

=== Week One ===
Date	Visiting team	Home team	Site	Result	Attendance	Reference
October 12	**Vanderbilt**	Missouri	Rollins Field • Columbia, MO	**L** 0–16		

=== Week Two ===
Date	Visiting team	Home team	Site	Result	Attendance	Reference
October 19	**Vanderbilt**	Central (KY)	Richmond, KY	**W** 10–0	400	
October 19	Wofford	**Georgia**	Herty Field • Athens, GA	**W** 34–0		

=== Week Three ===
Date	Time	Visiting team	Home team	Site	Result	Attendance	Reference
October 26	3:30 p. m.	North Carolina	**Georgia**	Athletic Park • Atlanta, GA	**L** 0–6	1,500	
October 28		North Carolina	**Vanderbilt**	Dudley Field • Nashville, TN	**L** 0–12	2,000	
October 29		North Carolina	**Sewanee**	Hardee Field • Sewanee, TN	**T** 0–0		
October 31		North Carolina	**Georgia**	Athletic Park • Atlanta, GA	**L** 6–10	350	

=== Week Four ===
Date	Visiting team	Home team	Site	Result	Attendance	Reference
November 2	Cumberland (TN)	**Sewanee**	McGee Field • Sewanee, TN	**W** 16–6		
November 2	Centre	**Vanderbilt**	Dudley Field • Nashville, TN	**T** 0–0		
November 2	**Alabama**	**Georgia**	Wildwood Park • Columbus, GA	**UGA** 30–6	500	

=== Week Five ===
Date	Visiting team	Home team	Site	Result	Attendance	Reference
November 9	**Auburn**	**Vanderbilt**	Dudley Field • Nashville, TN	**VAN** 9–6		
November 9	Nashville	**Sewanee**	McGee Field • Sewanee, TN	**W** 16–0		

=== Week Six ===
Date	Visiting team	Home team	Site	Result	Attendance	Reference
November 16	Virginia	**Vanderbilt**	Athletic Park • Atlanta, GA	**L** 4–6		
November 16	**Alabama**	Tulane	Tulane Athletic Field • New Orleans, LA	**L** 0–22	1,000	
November 18	**Alabama**	LSU	State Field • Baton Rouge, LA	**L** 6–12		
November 18	**Sewanee**	**Georgia**	Piedmont Park • Atlanta, GA	**SEW** 22–0		

=== Week Seven ===
Date	Visiting team	Home team	Site	Result	Attendance	Reference
November 23	**Auburn**	**Alabama**	The Quad • Tuscaloosa, AL	**AUB** 48–0		
November 23	**Georgia**	**Vanderbilt**	Dudley Field • Nashville, TN	**VAN** 6–0	1,200	

=== Week Eight ===
Date	Visiting team	Home team	Site	Result	Attendance	Reference
November 28	**Auburn**	**Georgia**	Piedmont Park • Atlanta, GA	**AUB** 16–6		
November 28	**Vanderbilt**	**Sewanee**	McGee Field • Sewanee, TN	**VAN** 18–6		

== Awards and honors ==
=== All-Southerns ===
- HB, sub - Phil Connell Vanderbilt
