= George Stephens (American football) =

American journalist and football player (1873–1946)

- Born: April 8, 1873; Summerfield, North Carolina, U.S.
- Died: April 1, 1946 (aged 72); Asheville, North Carolina, U.S.
- Occupation: Journalist
- Known for: Myers Park
- Football career

Profile
- Position: Halfback
- Class: 1896

Personal information
- Listed weight: 154 lb (70 kg)

Career information
- College: North Carolina (1894–1895)

Awards and highlights
- All-Southern (1895)

George Erwin Gullett Stephens (April 8, 1873 – April 1, 1946) was an American college football player. He caught the first forward pass in the history of the sport. He was later a journalist who also sold insurance and real estate.

== University of North Carolina ==
He was a prominent running back for the North Carolina Tar Heels football team of the University of North Carolina. He was selected third-team for an all-time Carolina football team of Dr. R. B. Lawson in 1934. Joel Whitaker selected him first-team for his all-time UNC squad.

=== 1895 ===
It is thought that the first forward pass in football occurred on October 26, 1895 in a game between Georgia and North Carolina when, out of desperation, the ball was thrown by the North Carolina back Joel Whitaker instead of punted. Stephens caught the ball and ran 70 yards for a touchdown. He was selected All-Southern.

== Myers Park ==
Stephens was much involved in the expansion of Myers Park.

== Journalist ==
He was joint president and publisher of the Charlotte Observer and joint owner and publisher of the Asheville Citizen.
