= 1895 Auburn Tigers football team =

American college football season

1895 Auburn Tigers football
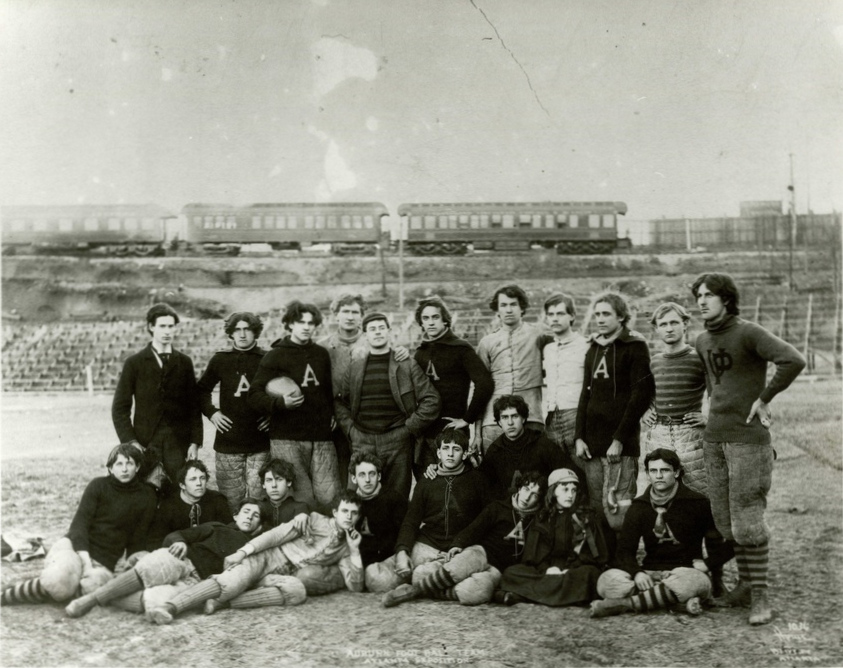
- Coach John Heisman is in the second row in the middle wearing glasses.
- Conference: Southern Intercollegiate Athletic Association
- Record: 2–1 (2–1 SIAA)
- Head coach: John Heisman (1st season)
- Captain: W. R. Shafer

1895 Southern Intercollegiate Athletic Association football standings
	Conf.					Overall
Team	W		L		T	W		L		T
Vanderbilt	3	–	0	–	0	5	–	3	–	1
Auburn	2	–	1	–	0	2	–	1	–	0
Georgia	2	–	2	–	0	3	–	4	–	0
Sewanee	0	–	2	–	0	2	–	2	–	1
Alabama	0	–	2	–	0	0	–	4	–	0

The Southern Intercollegiate Athletic Association Auburn Tigers football team represented Auburn University (then known as Agricultural and Mechanical College of Alabama) in the 1895 Southern Intercollegiate Athletic Association football season. It was the Tigers' fourth overall season and they competed as a member of the Southern Intercollegiate Athletic Association (SIAA). The team was led by head coach John Heisman, in his first year and finished with a record of two wins and one loss (2–1).

== Schedule ==
Date	Opponent	Site	Result	Source
November 9	at Vanderbilt	Dudley Field; Nashville, TN	L 6–9	
November 16	Sewanee	Drill Field; Auburn, AL	Canceled	
November 23	at Alabama	The Quad; Tuscaloosa, AL (Iron Bowl)	W 48–0	
November 28	at Georgia	Piedmont Park; Atlanta, GA (rivalry)	W 16–6	

== Trick play ==
The team executed a "hidden ball trick" in the game against Vanderbilt as Auburn seemed to run a revolving wedge. Vanderbilt still won however, 9 to 6; the first time in the history of southern football that a field goal decided a game. "Billy" Williams recalled:

I was playing left half for Auburn and Tichenor was quarterback. We were on Vandy's 15-yard line and had the ball in our possession. Tich passed the ball to me; I raised his jersey and hid the ball under it, at the same time dashing toward our right end, protected by several members of the Auburn team...Vandy thought I had the ball. Tich journeyed around his own left and went over the Vanderbilt's goal line. The first time the Vandy players knew Tich had the ball and had made a touchdown was when they saw him pulling the ball from under his jersey.

Quarterback Reynolds Tichenor described the nature of the play as follows:

"The play was simply this. When the ball was snapped it went to a halfback. The play was closely massed and well screened. The halfback then thrust the ball under the back of my jersey. Then he would crash into the line. After the play I simply trotted away to a touchdown.

The Tigers again used the play against Georgia. Georgia coach Pop Warner later used the trick in 1897 while at Cornell against Penn State; and again and most famously in 1903 while at Carlisle against Harvard, attracting national attention in a close loss.
