= Charles L. Upton =

American physician and football coach

Biographical details
- Born: September 10, 1870; Shelburne Falls, Massachusetts, U.S.
- Died: May 25, 1936 (aged 65); Greenfield, Massachusetts, U.S.
- Education: University of Pennsylvania

Coaching career (HC unless noted)
- 1895: Vanderbilt

Head coaching record
- Overall: 5–3–1

Charles Louis Upton (September 10, 1870 – May 25, 1936) was an American physician and college football coach. He was the fourth head football coach at Vanderbilt University, serving for one season, in 1895, and compiling a record of 5–3–1. Upton was born on September 10, 1870, in Shelburne Falls, Massachusetts. He graduated from Amherst College and received a medical degree from the University of Pennsylvania. Upton practiced medicine in Massachusetts. He died at his home in Greenfield, Massachusetts, on May 25, 1936.

== Head coaching record ==
Year	Team	Overall	Conference	Standing	Bowl/playoffs
Vanderbilt Commodores (Southern Intercollegiate Athletic Association) (1895)
1895	Vanderbilt	5–3–1	3–0	1st (Note: No conference members claimed a championship. Some publications dubbed North Carolina the SIAA champions for racking up a 3–0–1 road trip against SIAA opponents. Fuzzy Woodruff said Vanderbilt was the undisputed southeastern champion, but Virginia held preeminence in the entire South.)	
Vanderbilt:		5–3–1	3–0		
Total:		5–3–1			
