= 1895 Sewanee Tigers football team =

American college football season

1895 Sewanee Tigers football
- Conference: Southern Intercollegiate Athletic Association
- Record: 2–2–1 (0–2 SIAA)
- Head coach: William Ayres Reynolds (1st season)
- Captain: A. G. Blacklock
- Home stadium: Hardee Field

1895 Southern Intercollegiate Athletic Association football standings
	Conf.					Overall
Team	W		L		T	W		L		T
Vanderbilt	3	–	0	–	0	5	–	3	–	1
Auburn	2	–	1	–	0	2	–	1	–	0
Georgia	2	–	2	–	0	3	–	4	–	0
Sewanee	0	–	2	–	0	2	–	2	–	1
Alabama	0	–	2	–	0	0	–	4	–	0

The 1895 Sewanee Tigers football team represented the Sewanee Tigers of Sewanee: The University of the South during the 1895 Southern Intercollegiate Athletic Association football season. It was the inaugural season of the Southern Intercollegiate Athletic Association (SIAA). Led by William Ayres Reynolds in his first and only season as head coach, the Tigers compiled an overall record of 2–2–1 with a mark of 0–2 in conference play.

== Schedule ==
Date	Opponent	Site	Result	Source
October 29	North Carolina*	Hardee Field; Sewanee, TN	T 0–0	
November 2	Cumberland (TN)*	Hardee Field; Sewanee, TN	W 16–6	
November 9	Nashville*	Hardee Field; Sewanee, TN	W 16–0	
November 16	at Auburn	Drill Field; Auburn, AL	Canceled	
November 18	at Georgia	Piedmont Park; Atlanta, GA	L 0–22	
November 28	at Vanderbilt	Dudley Field; Nashville, TN (rivalry)	L 6–18	
*Non-conference game
