= James Pearce (tackle) =

American football player (1901–1971)

Profile
- Position: Tackle

Personal information
- Born: September 23, 1901; Winfield, Alabama, U.S.
- Died: August 7, 1971

Career information
- College: Auburn (1920–1922)

Awards and highlights
- All-Southern (1920, 1922)

James Gibson Pearce (September 23, 1901 – August 7, 1971) was a college football player.

== Early life ==
James was the son of Marvin Pearce. Marvin played both for Alabama and Auburn. Marvin's father was the Confederate general James P. Pearce.

== College football ==
Pearce was a prominent member of Mike Donahue's 1920 Auburn Tigers football team, one of Auburn's greatest teams. The 1922 team upset defending Southern champions Centre and is also considered highly, considered best by fullback Ed Sherling. Pearce made All-Southern in 1922.
