= 1895 Alabama Crimson White football team =

American college football season

1895 Alabama Crimson White football
- Conference: Southern Intercollegiate Athletic Association
- Record: 0–4 (0–2 SIAA)
- Head coach: Eli Abbott (3rd season)
- Captain: H. M. Bankhead
- Home stadium: The Quad

1895 Southern Intercollegiate Athletic Association football standings
	Conf.					Overall
Team	W		L		T	W		L		T
Vanderbilt	3	–	0	–	0	5	–	3	–	1
Auburn	2	–	1	–	0	2	–	1	–	0
Georgia	2	–	2	–	0	3	–	4	–	0
Sewanee	0	–	2	–	0	2	–	2	–	1
Alabama	0	–	2	–	0	0	–	4	–	0

The 1895 Alabama Crimson White football team (Note: Alabama football teams were not referred to as the "Crimson Tide" until the 1907 season. Prior to 1907, the team was called the "Crimson White" from 1893 to 1906 and the "Cadets" in 1892.) (variously "Alabama", "UA" or "Bama") represented the University of Alabama in the 1895 Southern Intercollegiate Athletic Association football season. The team was led by head coach Eli Abbott, in his third season, and played their home games at The Quad in Tuscaloosa, Alabama. In what was the fourth season of Alabama football, the team finished with a record of zero wins and four losses (0–4). The 1895 squad also was the first to compete in a conference, the Southern Intercollegiate Athletic Association (SIAA).

After a one-loss season in 1894, Abbott returned as head coach and led the 1895 squad. Alabama opened the season with a loss at Columbus against Georgia. The Crimson White next lost a pair of games in Louisiana over a span of just three days. After a loss to Tulane at New Orleans, Alabama was defeated by LSU in the first all-time game between the schools. They then closed the year with a 48–0 loss to Auburn in the first Iron Bowl ever played at Tuscaloosa.

== Schedule ==
Date	Opponent	Site	Result	Attendance	Source
November 9	vs. Georgia	Wildwood Park; Columbus, GA (rivalry)	L 6–30		
November 16	at Tulane*	Tulane Athletic Field; New Orleans, LA	L 0–22	1,000	
November 18	at LSU*	State Field; Baton Rouge, LA (rivalry)	L 6–12		
November 23	Auburn	The Quad; Tuscaloosa, AL (rivalry)	L 0–48		
*Non-conference game

(Note: For the 1895 season, point values were different from those used in contemporary games. In 1895 a touchdown was worth four points, a field goal was worth five points and an extra point (PAT) was worth two points.)

== Game summaries ==
=== Georgia ===
In what was the first ever game played in the state of Georgia, in their first all-time game against the University of Georgia, Alabama lost 30–6 before 500 fans in Columbus. Alabama took their only lead of the game early after Borden Burr scored a touchdown following a blocked punt. C. S. Pelham then kicked the PAT and Alabama led, 6–0. From that point, Georgia scored 30 unanswered points with touchdowns by Edgar Pomeroy, Rufus Nally and Craig Barrow in the first half; and touchdowns by Pomeroy and Fred Price in the second half for their 30–6 victory.

=== Tulane ===
After they defeated Tulane in their first matchup in 1894, Alabama was shut out 22–0 before 1,000 fans in New Orleans. A. K. Foote scored both of Tulane's first-half touchdowns to give them an 8–0 halftime lead. Tulane extended their lead in the second half with two touchdowns by Warren Johnson and one by S. S. Rubira on a 50-yard run in their 22–0 win.

=== LSU ===
Two days after their loss against Tulane, Alabama lost, 12–6, to long-time rival LSU at Baton Rouge in their first all-time meeting against the two schools. After a scoreless first half, Alabama took a 6–0 lead on their first drive of the second half on a T. W. Powers touchdown run. However, LSU scored twelve unanswered points on a pair of Sam Lambert touchdowns that gave them the 12–6 victory. This game was originally scheduled to be played on Friday, November 15, but was rescheduled for the Monday that followed due to a train delay as they traveled from Tuscaloosa across the Mississippi Valley.

=== Auburn ===
In the first all-time Iron Bowl played in Tuscaloosa, Alabama was defeated by the Agricultural & Mechanical College of Alabama (now known as Auburn University), 48–0. The 48-point margin of victory still stands tied with the 1900 Iron Bowl as the largest for Auburn in the Iron Bowl.

== Players ==
The following players were members of the 1895 football team according to the roster published in the 1896 edition of The Corolla, the University of Alabama yearbook.

Alabama Crimson White 1895 roster
Guards: Gideon Boykin; Henry Pratt; Tackles: J. H. Dew; C. M. Pearce; Ends: John Jenkins; Oscar Teague	Backs: H. M. Bankhead; Dexter Comstock; T. W. Powers; G. E. Stone; Quarterback: Borden Burr	Substitutes: Hill Ferguson; S. P. Johnston; A. B. McEachin; C. S. Pelham; Frank White
