= Marvin Pearce =

American football player (1879–1942)

Profile
- Position: Tackle

Personal information
- Born: August 9, 1879; Marion County, Alabama, U.S.
- Died: October 1, 1942 (aged 63); Winfield, Alabama, U.S.

Career information
- College: Alabama (1895); Auburn (1896–1897)

Clovis Marvin "Babe" Pearce (August 9, 1879 – October 1, 1942) was an American college football player for both Alabama and Auburn. At Auburn, he played under coach John Heisman. He was the father of James Pearce and Clark Pearce. Marvin's father was the Confederate general James P. Pearce. He enrolled at Alabama in 1895, after traveling to Tuscaloosa from Marion County in a horse-drawn buggy. He then transferred to Auburn for 1896 and 1897. Marvin was the first man to own a gasoline-powered vehicle in Marion County.
