= 1895 Vanderbilt Commodores football team =

American college football season

1895 Vanderbilt Commodores football
- Conference: Southern Intercollegiate Athletic Association
- Record: 5–3–1 (3–0 SIAA)
- Head coach: Charles L. Upton (1st season)
- Captain: Phil Connell
- Home stadium: Dudley Field

1895 Southern Intercollegiate Athletic Association football standings
	Conf.					Overall
Team	W		L		T	W		L		T
Vanderbilt	3	–	0	–	0	5	–	3	–	1
Auburn	2	–	1	–	0	2	–	1	–	0
Georgia	2	–	2	–	0	3	–	4	–	0
Sewanee	0	–	2	–	0	2	–	2	–	1
Alabama	0	–	2	–	0	0	–	4	–	0

The 1895 Vanderbilt Commodores football team represented Vanderbilt University during the 1895 Southern Intercollegiate Athletic Association football season was a member of the Southern Intercollegiate Athletic Association (SIAA). The team's head coach was Charles L. Upton, who only coached one season in that capacity, at Vanderbilt for one year.

== Schedule ==
Date	Time	Opponent	Site	Result	Attendance	Source
October 12		at Missouri*	Rollins Field; Columbia, MO	L 0–16		
October 19		at Central (KY)*	Richmond, KY	W 10–0	400	
October 28		North Carolina*	Dudley Field; Nashville, TN	L 0–12	2,000	
November 2		Centre*	Dudley Field; Nashville, TN	T 0–0		
November 9		Auburn	Dudley Field; Nashville, TN	W 9–6		
November 12		at Nashville Athletic Club*	Nashville, TN	W 20–4		
November 16	3:00 p.m.	vs. Virginia*	Athletic Park; Atlanta, GA	L 4–6	2,500	
November 23		Georgia	Dudley Field; Nashville, TN (rivalry)	W 6–0	1,200	
November 28		Sewanee	Dudley Field; Nashville, TN (rivalry)	W 18–6		
*Non-conference game
