= Auburn University traditions =

Traditions of American University

Auburn University has several notable traditions, many related to its varsity teams, the Auburn Tigers.

== Creed and songs ==
Auburn University has a creed, an alma mater, and a fight song.

=== Auburn Creed ===
In the early 1940s, Auburn professor George Petrie, who brought football to Auburn in 1891, wrote a creed which grew to become a unifying set of beliefs and principles common to all Auburn students, faculty, and alumni. This creed is said to embody the spirit of Auburn and is reflected in every member of the Auburn family.

I believe that this is a practical world and that I can count only on what I earn. Therefore, I believe in work, hard work.
I believe in education, which gives me the knowledge to work wisely and trains my mind and my hands to work skillfully.
I believe in honesty and truthfulness, without which I cannot win the respect and confidence of my fellow men.
I believe in a sound mind, a sound body, and a spirit that is not afraid, and in clean sports that develop these qualities.
I believe in obedience to law because it protects the rights of all.
I believe in the human touch, which cultivates sympathy with my fellow men and brings mutual helpfulness and happiness for all.
I believe in my country, because it is a land of freedom and because it is my own home, and that I can best serve that country by "doing justly, loving mercy, and walking humbly with my God."

And because Auburn men and women believe in these things, I believe in Auburn and love it.

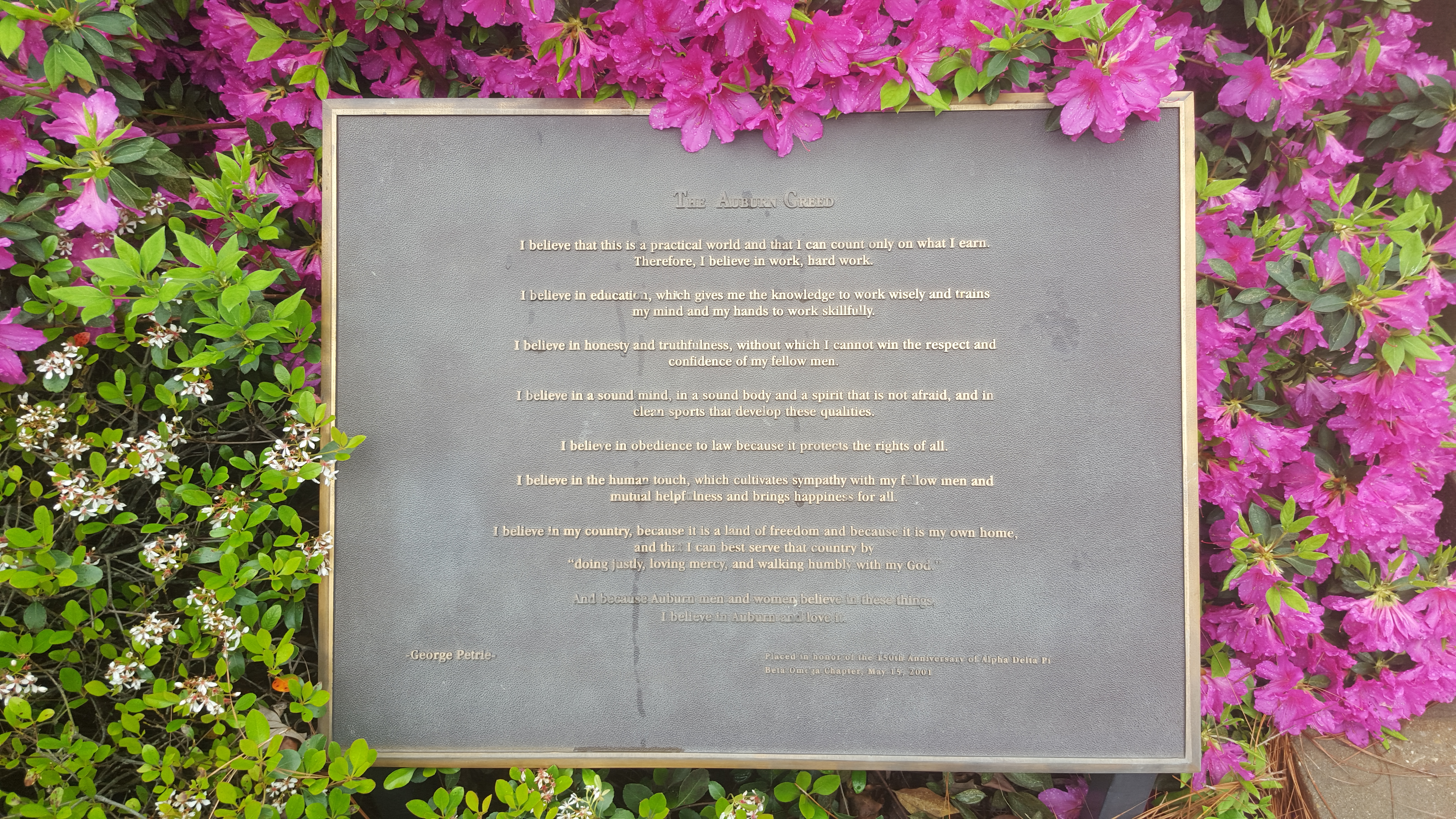
Placard with the Auburn Creed outside of Petrie Hall, Auburn University

The Auburn Creed was written in 1943, not 1945 as is frequently stated in various Auburn publications. It was first published in Auburn's student newspaper in 1944.

=== Alma mater ===
Auburn's alma mater was composed by Bill Wood in 1924, with revision to its lyrics by Emma O'Rear Foy in 1960. The 1960 changes became necessary when the Alabama Legislature granted university status to what had been known as Alabama Polytechnic Institute. The author of the 1960 revision was unclear until 2000, when Auburn professor Dale Coleman discovered the author to be Foy, wife of former dean of students James Foy. Both were University of Alabama alumni who later became boosters of Auburn.

On the rolling plains of Dixie
'Neath the sun-kissed sky,
Proudly stands our Alma Mater
Banners high.

To thy name we'll sing thy praise,
From hearts that love so true,
And pledge to thee our loyalty
The ages through.

We hail thee, Auburn, and we vow
To work for thy just fame,
And hold in memory as we do now
Thy cherished name.

Hear the student voices swelling,
Echoes strong and clear,
Adding laurels to thy fame
Enshrined so dear.

From the hallowed walls we'll part,
And bid thee sad adieu;
Thy sacred trust we'll bear with us
The ages through.

We hail thee, Auburn, and we vow
To work for thy just fame,
And hold in memory as we do now
Thy cherished name.

Originally the first verse and refrain were:

On the rolling plains of Dixie
'Neath its sun-kissed sky,
Proudly stands our Alma Mater
A. P. I.

To thy name we'll sing thy praise,
From hearts that love so true,
And pledge to thee our loyalty
The ages through.

Hail thy colors orange and blue, (note, "We" of the modern version is a rest in the original)
Unfurled unto the sky,
[ And to | To you ] our Alma Mater we'll be true,
O! A. P. I.

=== Fight song ===
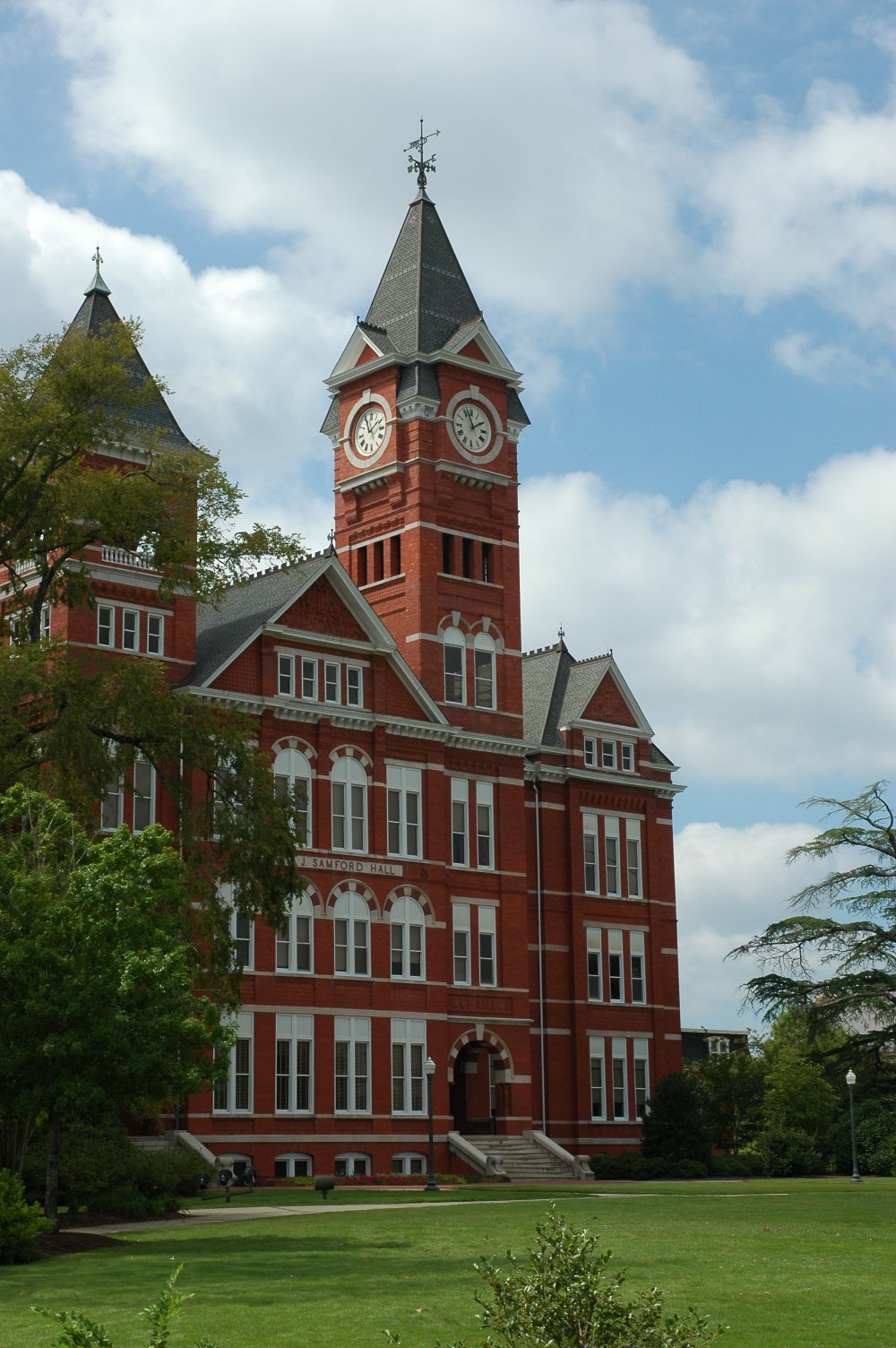
Samford Hall, with a clock tower that encloses a carillon that plays the university fight song once a day.

Auburn University's fight song, "War Eagle", was written in 1954 and 1955 by Robert Allen and Al Stillman. It was introduced at the beginning of the 1955 football season and served as the official fight song ever since.

War Eagle, fly down the field!
Ever to conquer, never to yield.
War Eagle, fearless and true,
Fight on you orange and blue.
Go! Go! Go!
On to vict'ry, strike up the band!
Give 'em hell, give 'em hell,
Stand up and yell, hey!
War Eagle, win for Auburn,
Power of Dixieland!

The alternate version the second half of the lyrics has been around since the initial publication, but is rarely heard. It was designed for use when singing with children, and for those offended by hell in the lyrics:

... On to vict'ry, strike up the band!
Hit 'em high, hit 'em low,
Stand up and yell, hey!
War Eagle, win for Auburn,
Power of Dixieland!

The carillon in the Samford Hall clock tower play the fight song every day at noon.

== Game-day traditions ==
=== A-Day ===
Each spring, a Founder's Day celebration is held in Auburn. As part of this celebration, the football team plays a scrimmage game that gives Auburn fans a chance to preview the Tigers before the fall.

=== Tiger Walk ===
Two hours before the kickoff of each Auburn home football game, thousands of Auburn fans line Donahue Drive to cheer on the team as they walk from the Auburn Athletic Complex to Jordan–Hare Stadium. The tradition began in the 1960s when groups of kids would walk up the street to greet the team and get autographs. During his tenure, coach Doug Barfield urged fans to come out and support the team, and thousands did, including the person responsible for starting this tradition: Dick Andrews. Today the team, led by the coaches, walks down the hill and into the stadium surrounded by fans who pat them on the back and shake their hands as they walk. To date, the largest Tiger Walk occurred on December 2, 1989, before the first-ever home football game against rival Alabama—the Iron Bowl. On that day, an estimated 20,000 fans packed the one block section of road leading to the stadium. According to former athletic director David Housel, Tiger Walk has become "the most copied tradition in all of college football."

=== Toomer's Corner ===
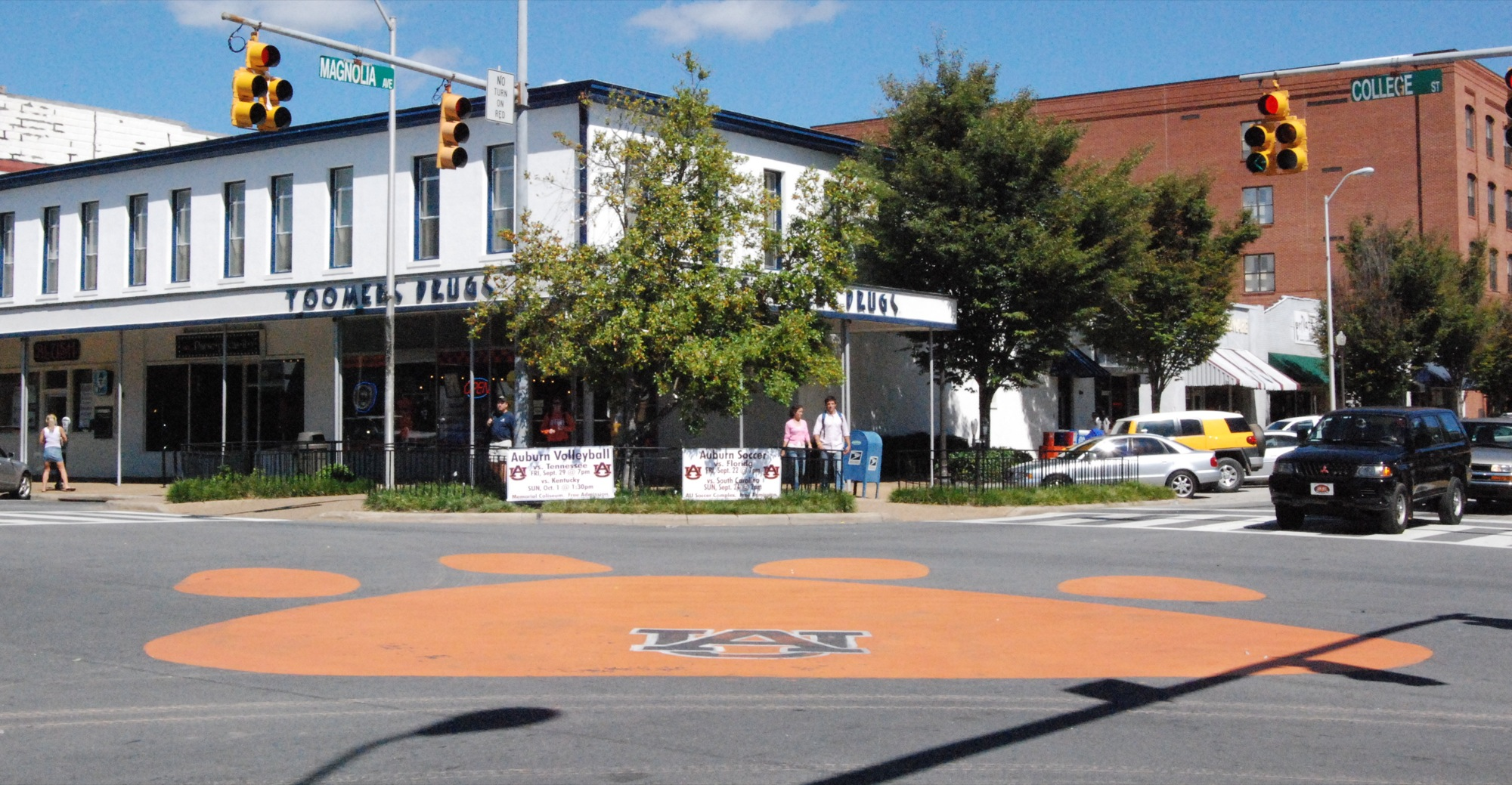
Tiger Paw painted on the street at Toomer's Corner with Toomer's Drugs in the background.

The intersection of Magnolia Avenue and College Street in Auburn, which marks the transition from downtown Auburn to the university campus, is known as Toomer's Corner. It is named for businessman and State Senator Sheldon "Shel" Toomer who founded Toomer's Drugs on the corner of Magnolia Avenue and College Street in 1896, and helped to found the Bank of Auburn in 1907. Toomer's Drugs is a small business on the corner that has been an Auburn landmark for over 130 years.

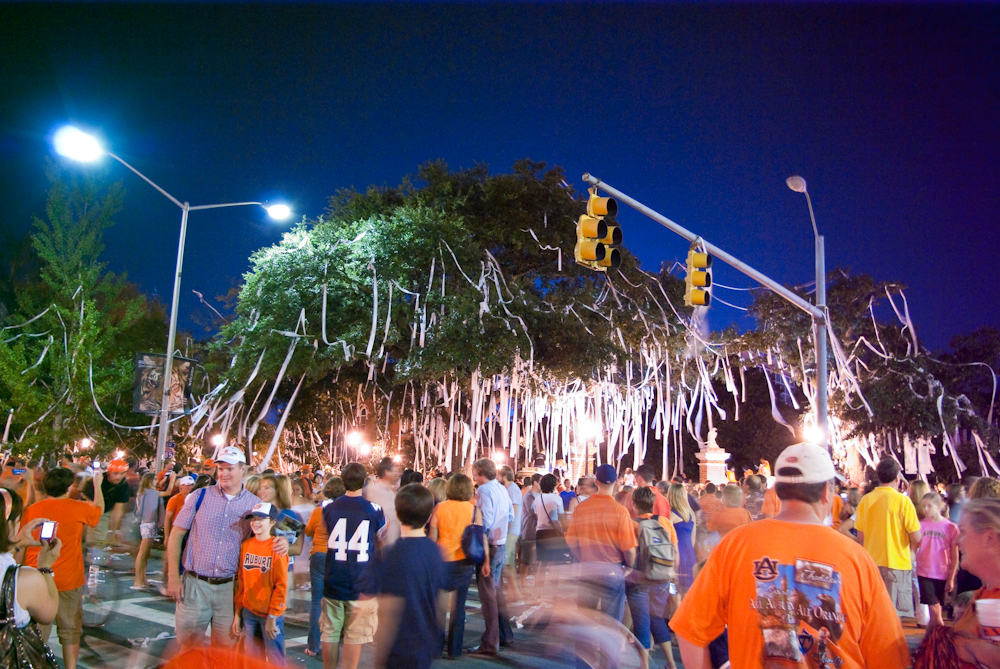
The Auburn tradition of rolling Toomer's Corner.

After their planting in 1937, two massive old-growth oak trees hung over the corner. A tradition developed in which, whenever there was cause for celebration in the Auburn community, the trees were festooned with toilet paper. Also known as "rolling the corner" or "rolling Toomer's," the tradition is often said to have begun when Toomer's Drugs had the only telegraph in the city. During away football games, when employees of the local drug store received news of a win, they would throw the ticker tape from the telegraph onto the power lines. The apocryphal ticker tape origins are frequently taught prospective students and incoming freshman in various orientation activities, though there is zero evidence to support the theory. The corner likely first began to be rolled at least semi-regularly in the late 1960s or early 1970s. The massive celebration at Toomer's Corner following Auburn's win in the 1972 Iron Bowl (the so-called "Punt, Bama, Punt" game) is often cited as the first time the corner was rolled; however, by that time fans had been rolling the corner for at least a year. Mainly used as a way to celebrate football victories, the tradition became a way to celebrate anything good that happened involving Auburn. The student government association worked with the City of Auburn to bring pep rallies on the plains back to Toomer's Corner during football season.

On January 27, 2011, a caller to the Paul Finebaum Radio Network who identified himself as "Al from Dadeville" claimed to have poisoned the oaks at Toomer's Corner with Spike 80DF, a potent commercial herbicide containing tebuthiuron, after Auburn's defeat of Alabama in the 2010 Iron Bowl. Subsequent soil tests showed high concentrations of the poison around the trees, and experts did not expect them to survive. There was also some concern about the possibility of the poison affecting the groundwater, but, on April 19, 2011, the university announced that tests of the groundwater had determined that it was safe.

After an investigation, Auburn city police, on February 17, 2011, arrested Harvey Updyke Jr., a 62-year-old man from Dadeville, and charged him with criminal mischief, a class C felony in Alabama. A grand jury subsequently indicted him on four felony charges and two misdemeanor charges. Updyke originally pleaded an insanity defense, but, on March 22, 2013, as part of a plea bargain with prosecutors, he pleaded guilty to a charge of criminal damage of an agricultural facility. The prosecutors dropped all other charges. Updyke was fined $1,000 and was given a three-year "split sentence" of imprisonment. Under the terms of the split sentence, he had to serve six months in jail and would then be on five years of supervised probation. He was given credit for 104 days of time already served. The conditions of his probation included a 7 p.m. curfew and bans on talking to the news media, entering the Auburn campus, or attending a college sporting event. Updyke was released from jail on June 10, 2013.

Tree experts worked for more than two years to save the Toomer's oaks, but, in the end, the efforts were not successful. On April 23, 2013, the two trees were cut down. Three days earlier, Auburn fans "rolled" the trees for a final time. Wood from the trees was made into keepsakes, and royalties from the sales of the keepsakes were earmarked for a special scholarship fund for Auburn students. A bowl that was also made from the wood was placed in the university art museum's permanent collection.

In November 2014, the university announced it would plant two new full grown oak trees in the spot the original trees stood, and additionally would plant thirty oaks descended from the original trees along a walkway approaching Toomer's Corner. The new trees would be planted in February 2015, and would be given at least one year to acclimate before the toilet paper rolling tradition would resume.

=== Aubie ===
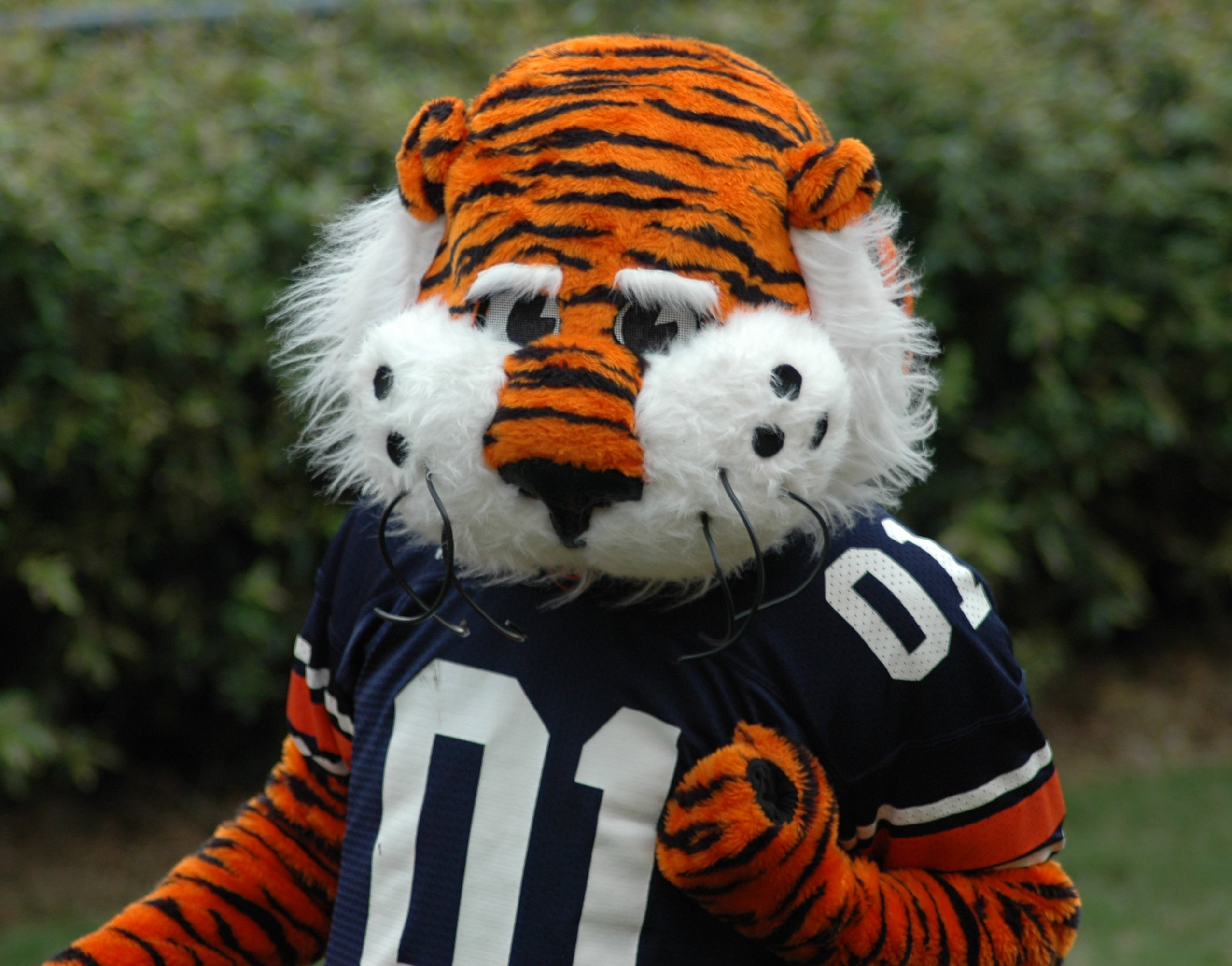
Aubie is the Auburn Tigers mascot.

Aubie is the official tiger mascot of Auburn University. Aubie is an anthropomorphic tiger.

Aubie has very animated characteristics such as his strut walk, quick turns, and exaggerated pointing. His style is to mix tiger and human traits such as using props, riding a moped, leading the band, and performing clownish pranks. Aubie made his debut in 1979 and is a popular beloved character among Auburn fans and one of the more animated mascots in the country.

Aubie has won a record ten mascot national championships (his latest coming in 2021), more than any other mascot in the United States. Aubie was named the 2014 Capital One Mascot of the Year and was among the first three college mascots inducted to the Mascot Hall of Fame, inducted on August 15, 2006.

Birmingham artist Phil Neel first drew the cartoon tiger Aubie in the late 1950s. From 1958 through 1976, Aubie was featured on the cover of all of Auburn's home football game programs. In 1979, James Lloyd, spirit director for the Auburn Student Government Association, brought Aubie to life when he ordered a man-sized Tiger costume based upon the cartoon and wore it to the Southeastern Conference basketball tournament. Barry Mask became the first official Aubie in 1979–80.

Aubie won an eighth Universal Cheerleaders' Association mascot championship on January 17, 2014. Aubie was inducted into the Mascot Hall of Fame on August 15, 2006. He was part of the first group of three collegiate mascots inducted.

=== War Eagle ===
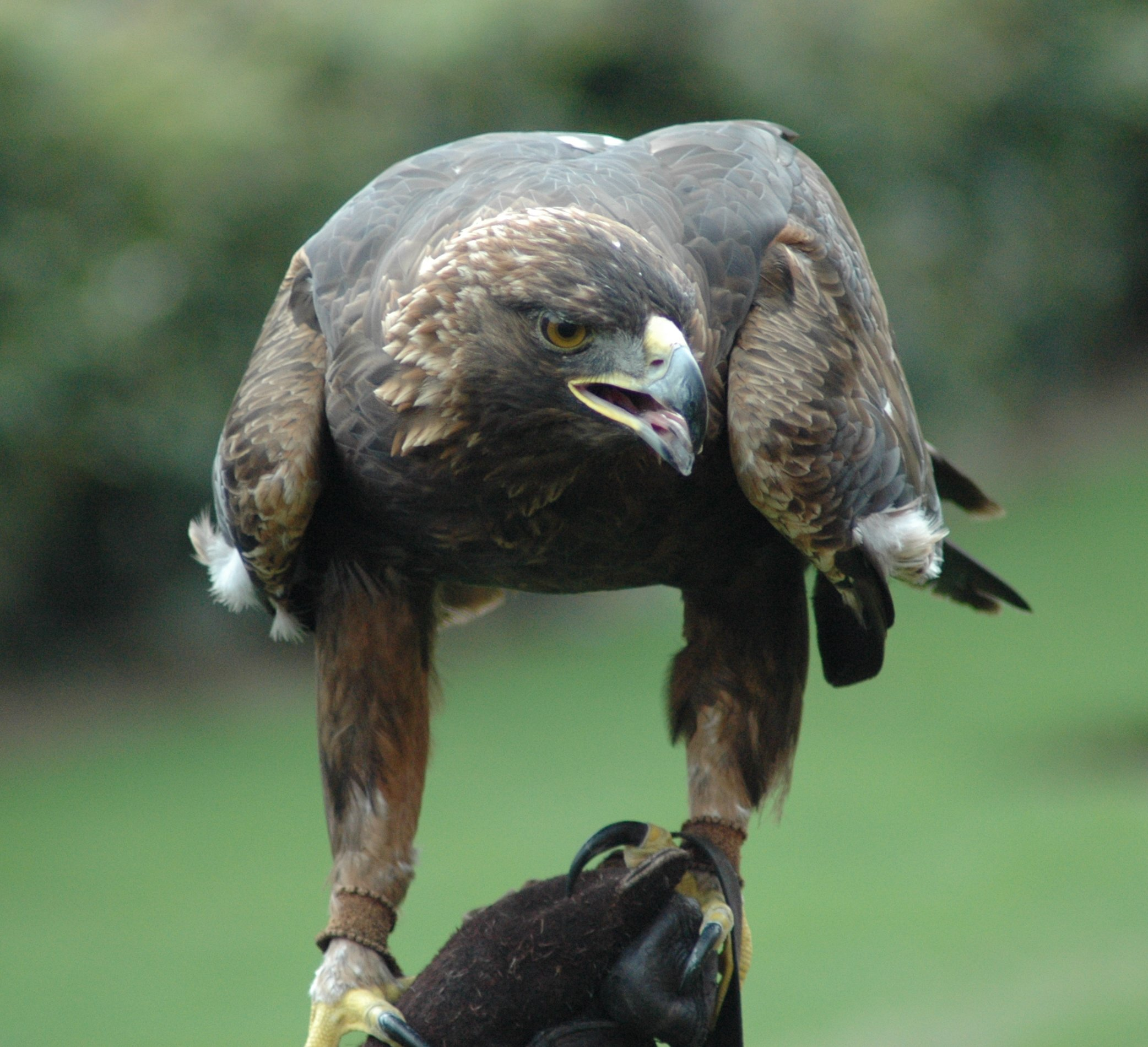
Nova, War Eagle VII.

The Auburn University battle cry is "War Eagle". It originated as an expression of support of Auburn's athletic teams, but today is also commonly used as a greeting between members of the Auburn community. The cry is yelled in unison by spectators for kickoffs of football games and tip-offs of basketball games.

In 1930, Auburn gained a live golden eagle mascot, known as "Tiger". Today, the seventh War Eagle, nicknamed "Nova", lives at a raptor center on the Auburn campus, and is featured before football games by a flight in which the eagle circles the stadium before landing at mid-field. Auburn University's website states that the most popular version of the "War Eagle" story dates back to 1892 when Auburn and Georgia met for the first time on the football field. The story tells of a Civil War veteran and his pet eagle he had found on a battlefield and rescued. During the game, the eagle soared into the sky over their field as the Auburn football team simultaneously charged the Georgia end zone and achieved their first, exhilarating win over Georgia. After the Tigers' victory, the eagle suddenly nose-dived, crashed into the field and died. But the "War Eagle" lived on in the hearts and spirits of proud Auburn fans everywhere.

=== Wreck Tech Pajama Parade ===
The Wreck Tech Pajama Parade was inspired by a prank pulled by a group of mischievous Auburn cadets who, determined to show up the more well-known engineers from Georgia Tech, sneaked out of their dorms the night before the 1896 football game between Auburn and Tech and greased the railroad tracks leading into Auburn. According to the story, the train carrying the Georgia Tech team slid through town and didn't stop until it was halfway to the neighboring town of Loachapoka, Alabama, The Georgia Tech team was forced to walk the five miles back to Auburn and, not surprisingly, was weary at the end of their journey, likely contributing to their subsequent 45–0 loss. USA Today ranked the prank as the second best college football-related prank in history. While the railroad long ago ceased to be the way teams traveled to Auburn and students never greased the tracks again, the tradition continued through 1988 in the form of a parade through downtown Auburn, as students paraded through the streets in their pajamas and organizations built floats. This tradition was recently renewed in 2003 and 2005, when Georgia Tech returned to Auburn's schedule after nearly two decades of absence.

=== Auburn University Marching Band ===
Founded in 1897, the band has long performed at school football games and pep rallies. The band was awarded the 2004 Sudler Intercollegiate Marching Band Trophy, the nation's highest award for college and university marching bands. The Auburn University Marching Band marched in the United States Presidential Inaugural Parade (for President George W. Bush) in 2005. In 2006, the Auburn University Marching Band had over 375 members, the largest in Auburn University history. The Auburn University Marching Band performed on January 15, 2007, at the Alabama Governor's Inaugural Parade in Montgomery and in 2008 in the St. Patrick's Day Parades in Limerick and Dublin, Ireland.

The Tiger Eyes are the "visual ensemble" of the Auburn University Marching Band. The Tiger Eyes are composed of three distinct lines—flags, majorettes, and dancers—that feature complementary choreography. The three lines work for one common visual effect as one ensemble. Tiger Eyes are selected by individual auditions.

== Other traditions ==
=== Callouts ===
Callouts is a tradition in which members of one of Auburn's many organizations will stand on the back steps of Cater Hall and "call out" the new members of the organization. After being "called out," new members traditionally run up the steps and join the other new members inside Cater Hall.

The student government association, Student Recruiters, and Camp War Eagle are just a few of the organizations that participate in the tradition. It is typical for friends and family of the candidates to attend callouts in support.

=== Hey Day ===
Hey Day is a tradition that takes place in both the fall and spring semesters dedicated to promoting friendliness on Auburn's campus. Students, faculty, and staff wear name tags and say "hey" to those they pass. There is also free food for students and entertainment provided by various campus performance groups.

Despite AU officially dating the tradition to the 1950s, it actually started at some point in the 1940s.

In 1985, there was a comical, short-lived Hey Day countermovement.

=== Homecoming ===
Though the 100th anniversary of homecoming at Auburn was celebrated in 2016, Auburn's first homecoming was actually held in 1909 and may have been the first college homecoming celebration in America.

=== Foy Information Desk ===
The Foy Information Desk is a telephone and walk-in information service provided by the university and is hosted in the new Student Union building. The service has been in continuous operation since the 1950s. At one time, the service was available 24 hours a day, but now is available from 6 am to midnight Central Standard Time. The Foy Information Desk service was initially designed as a resource for Auburn students who were looking for course information, grades, or campus services, but now accepts calls from the general public. In November 2007, Matt Lauer from the Today Show placed a call to Foy. The call was part of a feature in O Magazine called "Phone numbers that can change your life." The phone number to the Foy Information Desk is (334)844-4244.
