= Francis J. Powers =

American sportwriter (1895–1977)

Francis J. Powers (1895–1977) was a sportswriter best known for his work with the Chicago Daily News.

Powers worked as a journalist in Dayton and Cleveland, Ohio from 1916 to 1929 before moving to Chicago. He is credited with coining the memorable nickname of Elroy "Crazylegs" Hirsch, writing of Hirsch in 1942 in the Daily News, "His crazy legs were gyrating in six different directions, all at the same time." His 1950 interview with pitcher Charlie Root included Root's angry refutation of the legend of Babe Ruth's called shot, with Root saying of Ruth's alleged call, "If he [Ruth] had made a move like that—well, anyone who knows me knows the Babe would have wound up on his posterior. He would have got my hard, hard pitch. I mean hard and I mean inside."

Powers was the public relations director for the East–West Shrine Game from 1955 to 1975.
