= Joel Whitaker =

American ophthalmologist and college football player and coach

Biographical details
- Born: October 5, 1877; Warrenton, North Carolina, U.S.
- Died: October 13, 1947 (aged 70); Indianapolis, Indiana, U.S.

Playing career
- 1895: North Carolina
- Positions: Fullback, Quarterback

Coaching career (HC unless noted)
- 1897: Guilford

Head coaching record
- Overall: 2–2–1

Joel D. Whitaker (October 5, 1877 – October 13, 1947) was an American ophthalmologist and college football player and coach. He was hired as one of the first coaches of the Guilford Quakers in 1897, posting a 2–2–1 record. Whitaker played college football at the University of North Carolina, where he was a prominent quarterback and fullback, described by Kemp Plummer Battle as "probably the university's best all around athlete." In the 1895 Georgia vs. North Carolina football game, Whitaker threw what is purported by some to be the first forward pass. He picked an all-time UNC team in 1910.

Whitaker was born on October 5, 1877, in Warrenton, North Carolina. He died on October 13, 1947, at St. Vincent Indianapolis Hospital in Indianapolis, Indiana.
