= 1895 Georgia Bulldogs football team =

American college football season

1895 Georgia Bulldogs football
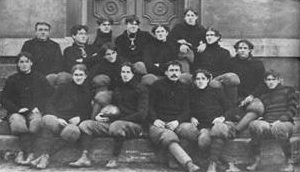
- Conference: Southern Intercollegiate Athletic Association
- Record: 3–4 (2–2 SIAA)
- Head coach: Pop Warner (1st season)
- Captain: H. W. Stubbs
- Home stadium: Herty Field

1895 Southern Intercollegiate Athletic Association football standings
	Conf.					Overall
Team	W		L		T	W		L		T
Vanderbilt	3	–	0	–	0	5	–	3	–	1
Auburn	2	–	1	–	0	2	–	1	–	0
Georgia	2	–	2	–	0	3	–	4	–	0
Sewanee	0	–	2	–	0	2	–	2	–	1
Alabama	0	–	2	–	0	0	–	4	–	0

The 1895 Georgia Bulldogs football team represented the University of Georgia during the 1895 Southern Intercollegiate Athletic Association football season. The Bulldogs competed as a member of the Southern Intercollegiate Athletic Association (SIAA) and completed the season with a 3–4 record, Georgia's first losing season. Georgia lost twice to North Carolina, and played Alabama for the first time.

== Before the season ==
Georgia's entire student body consisted of 126 students. This was Georgia's first year in the Southern Intercollegiate Athletic Association (SIAA), a conference that it founded along with Alabama, Auburn, Georgia Tech, North Carolina and Vanderbilt.

This was the Georgia Bulldogs' first season under the guidance of head coach Pop Warner. Warner was hired at a salary of $34 per week. While at Georgia, Warner also served as a co-coach at Iowa State.

== Schedule ==
Date	Time	Opponent	Site	Result	Attendance	Source
October 19		Wofford*	Herty Field; Athens, GA	W 34–0		
October 26		vs. North Carolina*	Athletic Grounds; Atlanta, GA	L 0–6	1,500	
October 31		vs. North Carolina*	Athletic Grounds; Atlanta, GA	L 6–10	350	
November 9		vs. Alabama	Wildwood Park; Columbus, GA (rivalry)	W 30–6		
November 18		Sewanee	Piedmont Park; Atlanta, GA	W 22–0		
November 23		at Vanderbilt	Dudley Field; Nashville, TN (rivalry)	L 0–6	1,200	
November 28	1:30 p. m.	vs. Auburn	Piedmont Park; Atlanta, GA (rivalry)	L 6–16	5,000	
*Non-conference game

== Game summaries ==
=== Wofford ===
The season opened with a 34–0 defeat of Wofford.

=== North Carolina ===
Team	1	2	Total
• UNC	6	0	6
Georgia	0	0	0

- Date: October 26

It was in 1895, in the first of the two games between Georgia and North Carolina, in which North Carolina completed the first recorded forward pass, even though the play was illegal at the time. According to John Heisman, the North Carolina quarterback was trying to punt the ball but, because the punt was about to be blocked, he threw the ball instead. Another North Carolina player caught the ball and scored a touchdown on a 70-yard play. Georgia coach Pop Warner complained to the referee that the play was illegal, however, the referee let the play stand because he did not see the pass.

Georgia's starting lineup was Ferrell (left end), Price (left tackle), Connally (left guard), Cochran (center), Moore (right guard), Kent (right tackle), Killorin (right end), Barrow (quarterback), Nalley (left halfback), Morris (right halfback), and Stubbs (fullback).

=== Alabama ===
On November 2, Georgia beat Alabama 30–6.

=== Sewanee ===
In Atlanta, Georgia beat Sewanee 22–0.

=== Vanderbilt ===
Vanderbilt beat Georgia 6–0. The Bulldogs disputed the touchdown and left the contest in a forfeit. Pomeroy fumbled and Vanderbilt's Elliott scored.

Georgia's starting lineup was: Clark (left end), Price (left tackle), Middlebrooks (left guard), Cochran (center), Walker (right guard), Kent (right tackle), Ferrell (right end), Barrow (quarterback), Nalley (left halfback), Morris (right halfback), Stubbs (fullback).

=== Auburn ===
Though the game was scheduled for 1:30 p. m., bickering between officials delayed the contest. John Heisman tried a hidden ball trick in the 16–6 win over Georgia, which Warner was to later use at Carlisle to defeat Harvard.

Georgia's starting lineup was: Morris (left end), Price (left tacle), Middlebrooks (left guard), Cochran (center), Walker (right guard), Kent (right tackle), Ferrell (right end), Barrow (quarterback), Pomeroy (left halfback), Nalley (right halfback), Stubbs (fullback).
