= 1895 VAMC football team =

American college football season

1895 VAMC football
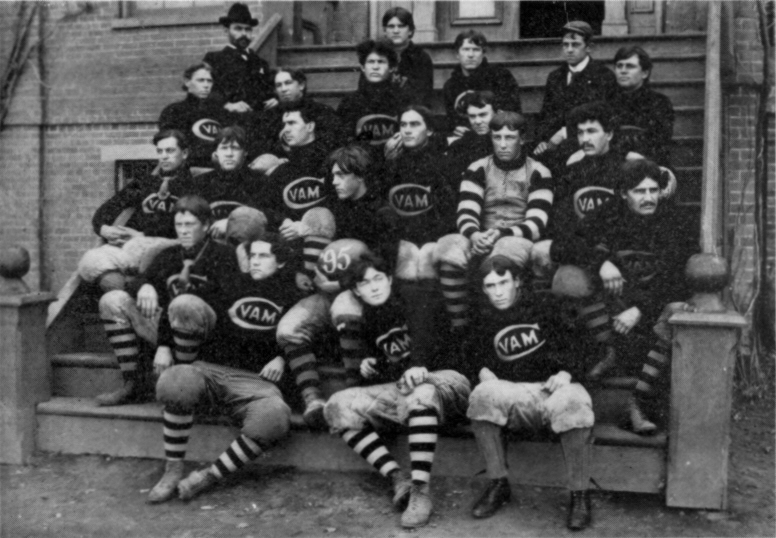
- Conference: Independent
- Record: 4–2
- Head coach: Arlie C. Jones (1st season)
- Captains: J. Lewis Ingles; Nerbon Robert Patrick
- Home stadium: Sheib Field

1895 Southern college football independents records
	Conf.			Overall
Team	W	L	T	W		L		T
Texas		–		5	–	0	–	0
LSU		–		3	–	0	–	0
Arkansas		–		1	–	0	–	0
Henry Kendall		–		1	–	0	–	0
North Carolina		–		7	–	1	–	1
VMI		–		5	–	1	–	0
West Virginia		–		5	–	1	–	0
Centre		–		4	–	1	–	1
Virginia		–		9	–	3	–	0
Wofford		–		3	–	1	–	0
Navy		–		5	–	2	–	0
Ole Miss		–		2	–	1	–	0
South Carolina		–		2	–	1	–	0
VAMC		–		4	–	2	–	0
Tulane		–		3	–	2	–	0
Tennessee		–		3	–	2	–	1
Centenary		–		1	–	1	–	0
Guilford		–		1	–	1	–	0
Kentucky State College		–		4	–	5	–	0
North Carolina A&M		–		1	–	2	–	1
Central (KY)		–		1	–	2	–	0
Wake Forest		–		0	–	0	–	1
Marshall		–		0	–	1	–	1
Delaware		–		1	–	3	–	0
Columbian		–		0	–	1	–	1
Richmond		–		0	–	5	–	1
Catholic University		–		0	–	1	–	0
Oklahoma		–		0	–	1	–	0
Furman		–		0	–	2	–	0
Mississippi A&M		–		0	–	2	–	0

The 1895 VAMC football team represented Virginia Agricultural and Mechanical College in the 1895 college football season. The team was led by their head coach Arlie C. Jones and finished with a record of four wins and two losses (4–2).

== Schedule ==
Date	Time	Opponent	Site	Result	Attendance	Source
October 5	4:12 p.m.	at Virginia	Madison Hall Field; Charlottesville, VA (rivalry)	L 0–36	300	
October 12	3:30 p.m.	St. Albans Lutheran Boys School	Sheib Field; Blacksburg, VA	W 12–0	600	
October 26		at Washington and Lee	University Athletic Park; Lexington, VA	W 30–0	500	
November 9	4:45 p.m.	at Roanoke YMCA	Roanoke Athletic Club Grounds; Roanoke, VA	W 16–2	300	
November 16	4:00 p.m.	vs. North Carolina	Latta Park; Charlotte, NC	L 5–32	1,000	
November 28	11:30 a.m.	vs. VMI	Lynchburg, VA (rivalry)	W 6–4	3,000	

== Game summaries ==
=== Virginia ===
VPI at Virginia

Team	1	2	Total
VPI	0	0	0
• UVA	18	18	36

- Date: October 5, 1895
- Location: Madison Hall Field
  Charlottesville, VA
- Game start: 4:12 p.m.
- Game attendance: 300
- Referee: Semple

On October 5, 1895, VAMC played their first game of the season against the University of Virginia at Madison Hall Field in Charlottesville, Virginia and lost 0–36. Virginia scored in the first five minutes of the game, with a rushing touchdown by quarterback Archie Hoxton. VAMC failed to get within 25 yards of the end zone during the entire game.

The starting lineup for VAMC was: A. T. Eskridge (left end), Johnson (left tackle), James (left guard), Thomas (center), Patrick (right guard), Hart (right tackle), Davis (right end), Martin (quarterback), Ingles (left halfback), A. P. Eskridge (right halfback), Dashiell (fullback). The substitutes were: Wills.

The starting lineup for Virginia was: Smith (left end), Eugene Davis (left tackle), R. N. Poindexter (left guard), Sturgess (center), U. M. Carwell (right guard), Wallace (right tackle), Hill (right end), Archie Hoxton (quarterback), Paul Cocke (left halfback), Robert Groner (right halfback), Richard S. Whaley (fullback). The substitutes were: Jesse Brinker.

=== St. Albans ===
St. Albans vs. VAMC

Team	1	2	Total
St. Albans	0	0	0
• VAMC	0	12	12

- Date: October 12, 1895
- Location: Sheib Field
  Blacksburg, VA
- Game start: 3:30 p.m.
- Game attendance: 600
- Referee: Missie

VAMC played St. Albans Boys Lutheran School on October 12, 1895 and won 12–0 in front of 600 spectators. Neither team scored points in the first half, but VAMC scored two touchdowns in the second half, with T. D. Martin kicking two successful extra points.

=== Washington and Lee ===
VAMC played their third game of the season on October 26, 1895 against Washington and Lee University in Lexington, VA with 500 in attendance. VAMC halfback A. P. Eskridge recorded a forty five-yard run and a touchdown, and halfback J. Lewis Ingles had an eighty five-yard touchdown run. The other touchdowns were scored by Miles Hart (2) and William Mayer.

The starting lineup for VAMC was: Johnson (left end), James (left tackle), Mayer (left guard), Thomas (center), Patrick (right guard), Hart (right tackle), Watts (right end), Martin (quarterback), Ingles (left halfback), A. P. Eskridge (right halfback), Dashiell (fullback). The substitutes were: Wills.

The starting lineup for Washington and Lee was: Mitchell (left end), Dice (left tackle), William Mason (left guard), Jay Oberlin (center), Carlock (right guard), James Cowan (right tackle), Lunsford (right end), Willis (quarterback), Albert Jenkins (left halfback), Henry Larrimore (right halfback), Barclay (fullback).

=== Roanoke YMCA ===
On November 9, 1895, VAMC played against the Roanoke YMCA on the Roanoke Athletic Club grounds in front of 300 people. VAMC scored a touchdown within the first ten minutes of play, and then on the next drive, VAMC turned the ball over on downs. Roanoke then passed the ball to their fullback Meade, who then attempted a failed dropkick. On the very next play, VAMC scored a rushing touchdown. VAMC then scored again six minutes into the second half. Roanoke was then able to drive down the field and made it to the four-yard line, but then their halfback S. Handy fumbled and it was recovered by VAMC. However, Roanoke YMCA was then able to record a safety, their only points of the game. The game was then called because of darkness, and VAMC won 16–2.

The starting lineup for VAMC was: Johnson (left end), James (left tackle), Mayer (left guard), Thomas (center), Patrick (right guard), Hart (right tackle), Norfleet (right end), Martin (quarterback), A. P. Eskridge (left halfback), Ingles (right halfback), Dashiell (fullback). The substitutes were: Cox and Wood.

The starting lineup for Roanoke YMCA was: Obenshain (left end), W. Turner (left tackle), Nunan (left guard), M. W. Turner (center), Nelms (right guard), Bently (right tackle), Moss (right end), Duke (quarterback), S. Handy (left halfback), K, Handy (right halfback), Meade (fullback).

=== North Carolina ===
North Carolina vs. VAMC

Team	1	2	Total
• UNC	16	16	32
VAMC	0	5	5

- Date: November 16, 1895
- Location: Latta Park
  Charlotte, NC
- Game start: 4:00 p.m.
- Game attendance: 1,000
- Referee: Adams

VAMC lost a second game on November 16, 1895 against the University of North Carolina in Charlotte, North Carolina with 1,000 looking on. North Carolina scored three touchdowns in the first half and then scored two more touchdowns in the second half. VAMC then drove to North Carolina's three-yard line, but was stopped on downs. The final score was 5–32.

The starting lineup for VAMC was: Johnson (left end), James (left tackle), Mayer (left guard), Thomas (center), Patrick (right guard), Hart (right tackle), Watts (right end), Martin (quarterback), Ingles (left halfback), A. P. Eskridge (right halfback), Dashiell (fullback). The substitutes were: Cunningham, Norfleet, Starke and Wills.

The starting lineup for North Carolina was: Edwin Gregory (left end), Robert Wright (left tackle), Thomas Hurley (left guard), White (center), Harris T. Collier (right guard), Jim Baird (right tackle), Willie Merritt (right end), Benjamin Stanley (quarterback), George Stephens (left halfback), John Moore (right halfback), George Butler (fullback). The substitutes were: Sammy Strang, Robert Steele and Joel Whitaker.

=== VMI ===
VMI vs. VAMC

Team	1	2	Total
VMI	4	0	4
• VAMC	0	6	6

- Date: November 28, 1895
- Location: Lynchburg, VA
- Game start: 11:30 a.m.
- Game attendance: 3,000

On November 28, 1895, VAMC played their final game of the season against the Virginia Military Institute in Lynchburg, Virginia in front 3,000 spectators. VMI was the first team to put points on the board, when their halfback Dickinson scored a rushing touchdown at the end of the first half. However, VAMC's Miles Hart was able to rush into the end zone for a touchdown and R. N. Watts kicked the extra point to win the game, 6–4.

The starting lineup for VAMC was: Johnson (left end), James (left tackle), Mayer (left guard), Thomas (center), Patrick (right guard), Hart (right tackle), Watts (right end), Martin (quarterback), Ingles (left halfback), A. P. Eskridge (right halfback), Dashiell (fullback). The substitutes were: Cox, Herbert, Massie, Starke and Wills.

The starting lineup for VMI was: Henry Shirley (left end), Alexander Moore (left tackle), Richard Poindexter (left guard), Peyton Locker (center), Morrell Mills (right guard), Charles Michel (right tackle), Sidney Moore (right end), Rose (quarterback), Richard Lawson (left halfback), Charles Dickinson (right halfback), William Twiggs (fullback).

== Players ==
The following players were members of the 1895 football team according to the roster published in the 1896 and 1903 editions of The Bugle, the Virginia Tech yearbook.

VAMC 1895 roster
Quarterback: Tarpley Douglas Martin; Guards: William Lawrence Mayer; Nerbon Robert Patrick (Capt.); Tackles: Miles Taylor Hart; William Lewis James; Center: Sidney Johnson Thomas	Ends: William Kinckle Davis; Howard Archer Johnson; R. N. Watts; Halfbacks: Alexander Parker Eskridge; J. Lewis Ingles (Capt.); Fullback: Thomas Edward Dashiell	Substitutes: Samuel Guy Bralley; William Franklin Cox; Daniel Goode Cunningham; Edward Henry Herbert; Paul Judson Norfleet; William Edwin Starke; Obediah Francis Whitehurst; Samuel Spotswood Wills; John Hoge Woolwine

== Coaching and training staff ==
- Head coach: Arlie C. Jones
- Assistant coaches
  - Joseph Massie
  - Saunders Taylor
- Manager: Leslie D. Kline
- Local manager: Chas. M. Christian
- Medical adviser: William F. Henderson, MD
