= 1895 North Carolina A&M Aggies football team =

American college football season

1895 North Carolina A&M Aggies football
- Conference: Independent
- Record: 1–2–1
- Head coach: Bart Gatling (3rd season)
- Home stadium: Athletic Park

1895 Southern college football independents records
	Conf.			Overall
Team	W	L	T	W		L		T
Texas		–		5	–	0	–	0
LSU		–		3	–	0	–	0
Arkansas		–		1	–	0	–	0
Henry Kendall		–		1	–	0	–	0
North Carolina		–		7	–	1	–	1
VMI		–		5	–	1	–	0
West Virginia		–		5	–	1	–	0
Centre		–		4	–	1	–	1
Virginia		–		9	–	3	–	0
Wofford		–		3	–	1	–	0
Navy		–		5	–	2	–	0
Ole Miss		–		2	–	1	–	0
South Carolina		–		2	–	1	–	0
VAMC		–		4	–	2	–	0
Tulane		–		3	–	2	–	0
Tennessee		–		3	–	2	–	1
Centenary		–		1	–	1	–	0
Guilford		–		1	–	1	–	0
Kentucky State College		–		4	–	5	–	0
North Carolina A&M		–		1	–	2	–	1
Central (KY)		–		1	–	2	–	0
Wake Forest		–		0	–	0	–	1
Marshall		–		0	–	1	–	1
Delaware		–		1	–	3	–	0
Columbian		–		0	–	1	–	1
Richmond		–		0	–	5	–	1
Catholic University		–		0	–	1	–	0
Oklahoma		–		0	–	1	–	0
Furman		–		0	–	2	–	0
Mississippi A&M		–		0	–	2	–	0

The 1895 North Carolina A&M Aggies football team represented the North Carolina A&M Aggies of North Carolina College of Agriculture and Mechanic Arts (now known as North Carolina State University) during the 1895 college football season.

== Schedule ==
Date	Time	Opponent	Site	Result	Source
October 12		at North Carolina	Campus Athletic Field; Chapel Hill, NC (rivalry)	L 0–36	
October 18	4:00 p.m.	Richmond	Athletic Park; Raleigh, NC	W 6–0	
October 19		Wake Forest	Athletic Park; Raleigh, NC (rivalry)	T 4–4	
October 25		vs. VMI	Atlanta, GA	L 6–42	
