= 1895 Centre football team =

American college football season

1895 Centre football
- Conference: Independent
- Record: 4–1–1
- Head coach: Richard T. Lowndes (1st season)

1895 Southern college football independents records
	Conf.			Overall
Team	W	L	T	W		L		T
Texas		–		5	–	0	–	0
LSU		–		3	–	0	–	0
Arkansas		–		1	–	0	–	0
Henry Kendall		–		1	–	0	–	0
North Carolina		–		7	–	1	–	1
VMI		–		5	–	1	–	0
West Virginia		–		5	–	1	–	0
Centre		–		4	–	1	–	1
Virginia		–		9	–	3	–	0
Wofford		–		3	–	1	–	0
Navy		–		5	–	2	–	0
Ole Miss		–		2	–	1	–	0
South Carolina		–		2	–	1	–	0
VAMC		–		4	–	2	–	0
Tulane		–		3	–	2	–	0
Tennessee		–		3	–	2	–	1
Centenary		–		1	–	1	–	0
Guilford		–		1	–	1	–	0
Kentucky State College		–		4	–	5	–	0
North Carolina A&M		–		1	–	2	–	1
Central (KY)		–		1	–	2	–	0
Wake Forest		–		0	–	0	–	1
Marshall		–		0	–	1	–	1
Delaware		–		1	–	3	–	0
Columbian		–		0	–	1	–	1
Richmond		–		0	–	5	–	1
Catholic University		–		0	–	1	–	0
Oklahoma		–		0	–	1	–	0
Furman		–		0	–	2	–	0
Mississippi A&M		–		0	–	2	–	0

The 1895 Centre football team represented Centre College as an independent the 1895 college football season. Led by Richard T. Lowndes in his first and only season as head coach, Centre compiled a record of 4–1–1.

== Schedule ==
Date	Time	Opponent	Site	Result	Attendance	Source
October 19	3:00 p.m.	Kentucky State College	Danville, KY (rivalry)	L 0–6	500	
October 26		Kentucky University	Danville, KY	W 28–0		
November 2		at Vanderbilt	Dudley Field; Nashville, TN	T 0–0		
November 9		at Louisville Athletic Club	Louisville, KY	W 10–0		
November 16		Ohio State	Danville, KY	W 18–0		
November 28		at Kentucky State College	Lexington, KY	W 16–0	3,000	
All times are in Eastern time
