= 1895 Ole Miss Rebels football team =

American college football season

1895 Ole Miss Rebels football
- Conference: Independent
- Record: 2–1
- Head coach: H. L. Fairbanks (1st season)

1895 Southern college football independents records
| | Conf. | | | Overall |
| Team | W | L | T | W | | L | | T |
|---|---|---|---|---|---|---|---|---|
| Texas | | – | | 5 | – | 0 | – | 0 |
| LSU | | – | | 3 | – | 0 | – | 0 |
| Arkansas | | – | | 1 | – | 0 | – | 0 |
| Henry Kendall | | – | | 1 | – | 0 | – | 0 |
| North Carolina | | – | | 7 | – | 1 | – | 1 |
| VMI | | – | | 5 | – | 1 | – | 0 |
| West Virginia | | – | | 5 | – | 1 | – | 0 |
| Centre | | – | | 4 | – | 1 | – | 1 |
| Virginia | | – | | 9 | – | 3 | – | 0 |
| Wofford | | – | | 3 | – | 1 | – | 0 |
| Navy | | – | | 5 | – | 2 | – | 0 |
| Ole Miss | | – | | 2 | – | 1 | – | 0 |
| South Carolina | | – | | 2 | – | 1 | – | 0 |
| VAMC | | – | | 4 | – | 2 | – | 0 |
| Tulane | | – | | 3 | – | 2 | – | 0 |
| Tennessee | | – | | 3 | – | 2 | – | 1 |
| Centenary | | – | | 1 | – | 1 | – | 0 |
| Guilford | | – | | 1 | – | 1 | – | 0 |
| Kentucky State College | | – | | 4 | – | 5 | – | 0 |
| North Carolina A&M | | – | | 1 | – | 2 | – | 1 |
| Central (KY) | | – | | 1 | – | 2 | – | 0 |
| Wake Forest | | – | | 0 | – | 0 | – | 1 |
| Marshall | | – | | 0 | – | 1 | – | 1 |
| Delaware | | – | | 1 | – | 3 | – | 0 |
| Columbian | | – | | 0 | – | 1 | – | 1 |
| Richmond | | – | | 0 | – | 5 | – | 1 |
| Catholic University | | – | | 0 | – | 1 | – | 0 |
| Oklahoma | | – | | 0 | – | 1 | – | 0 |
| Furman | | – | | 0 | – | 2 | – | 0 |
| Mississippi A&M | | – | | 0 | – | 2 | – | 0 |

The 1895 Ole Miss Rebels football team represented the University of Mississippi as an independent during the 1895 college football season. Led by H. L. Fairbanks in his first and only season as head coach, Ole Miss compiled a record of 4–1. The game against LSU was cancelled.

== Schedule ==
| Date | Opponent | Site | Result | Source |
|---|---|---|---|---|
| October 12 | St. Thomas Hall | Oxford, MS | W 18–0 | |
| November 23 | at Memphis AC | Memphis, TN | W 2–0 | |
| November 28 | at Tulane | Tulane Athletic Field; New Orleans, LA (rivalry) | L 4–28 | |
