= 1895 North Carolina Tar Heels football team =

American college football season

1895 North Carolina Tar Heels football
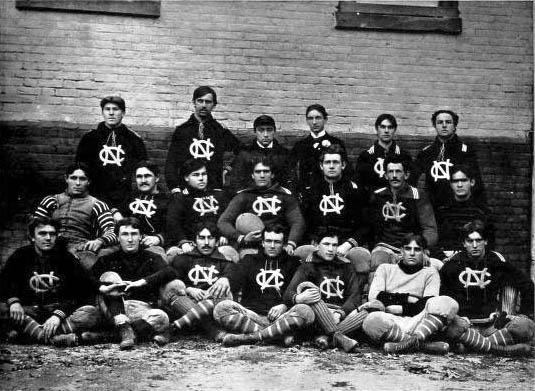
- Conference: Independent
- Record: 7–1–1
- Head coach: Thomas Trenchard (1st season)
- Captain: Edwin Gregory
- Home stadium: Campus Athletic Field (I)

1895 Southern college football independents records
	Conf.			Overall
Team	W	L	T	W		L		T
Texas		–		5	–	0	–	0
LSU		–		3	–	0	–	0
Arkansas		–		1	–	0	–	0
Henry Kendall		–		1	–	0	–	0
North Carolina		–		7	–	1	–	1
VMI		–		5	–	1	–	0
West Virginia		–		5	–	1	–	0
Centre		–		4	–	1	–	1
Virginia		–		9	–	3	–	0
Wofford		–		3	–	1	–	0
Navy		–		5	–	2	–	0
Ole Miss		–		2	–	1	–	0
South Carolina		–		2	–	1	–	0
VAMC		–		4	–	2	–	0
Tulane		–		3	–	2	–	0
Tennessee		–		3	–	2	–	1
Centenary		–		1	–	1	–	0
Guilford		–		1	–	1	–	0
Kentucky State College		–		4	–	5	–	0
North Carolina A&M		–		1	–	2	–	1
Central (KY)		–		1	–	2	–	0
Wake Forest		–		0	–	0	–	1
Marshall		–		0	–	1	–	1
Delaware		–		1	–	3	–	0
Columbian		–		0	–	1	–	1
Richmond		–		0	–	5	–	1
Catholic University		–		0	–	1	–	0
Oklahoma		–		0	–	1	–	0
Furman		–		0	–	2	–	0
Mississippi A&M		–		0	–	2	–	0

The 1895 North Carolina Tar Heels football team represented the University of North Carolina during the 1895 college football season. They played nine games with a final record of 7–1–1. The team captain for the 1895 season was Edwin Gregory. The team went 3–0–1 on a 6-day, 4 game road trip. An 1895 UNC football from this season was shown on Antiques Roadshow season 30, episode 16

== Schedule ==
Date	Time	Opponent	Site	Result	Attendance	Source
October 12	4:15 p.m.	North Carolina A&M	Campus Athletic Field (I); Chapel Hill, NC (rivalry)	W 36–0		
October 19		Richmond	Campus Athletic Field (I); Chapel Hill, NC	W 34–0		
October 26	3:30 p.m.	vs. Georgia	Athletic Park; Atlanta, GA (first forward pass)	W 6–0	1,500	
October 28		at Vanderbilt	Old Dudley Field; Nashville, TN	W 12–0	2,000	
October 29		at Sewanee	Hardee Field; Sewanee, TN	T 0–0		
October 31	3:30 p.m.	vs. Georgia	Athletic Park; Atlanta, GA	W 10–6	350	
November 9	3:55 p.m.	vs. Washington and Lee	Rivermont Ball Park; Lynchburg, VA	W 16–0		
November 16	4:00 p.m.	vs. VAMC	Latta Park; Charlotte, NC	W 32–5	1,000	
November 28	2:50 p.m.	vs. Virginia	West End Park; Richmond, VA (rivalry)	L 0–6	9,000	

== Game summaries ==
=== North Carolina A&M ===
The season opened with a defeat of the rival A and M college by a 36–0 score Nicklin had runs of 57, 67, and 80 yards.

The starting lineup was Gregory (left end), Steele (left tackle), Hurley (left guard), White (center), Collier (right guard), Wright (right tackle), Merritt (right ed), Whitaker (quarterback), Nicklin (left halfback), Moore (right halfback), McRae (fullback).

=== Richmond ===
The Tar Heels beat the winless Richmond Spiders 34–0.

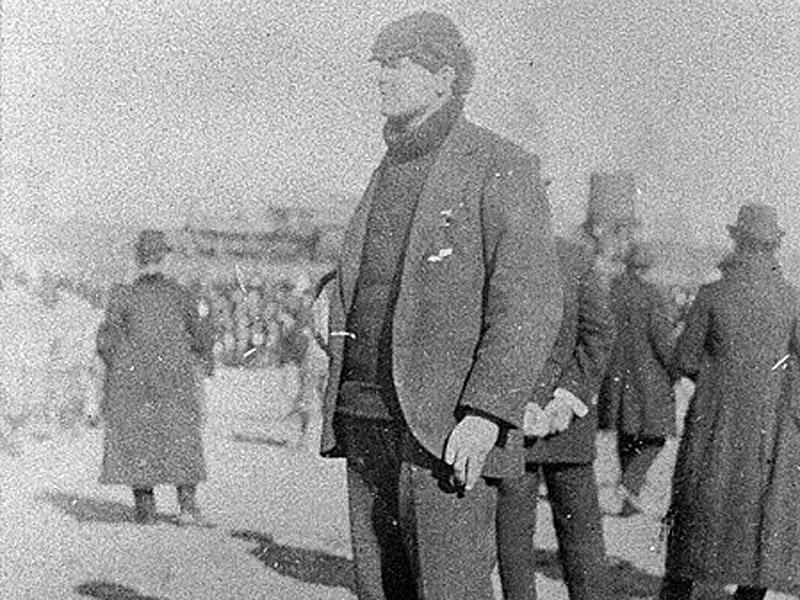
Pop Warner on the Georgia sidelines.

=== Georgia ===
Team	1	2	Total
• UNC	6	0	6
Georgia	0	0	0

- Location: Athletic Grounds
  Atlanta
- Game attendance: 1,500

The Georgia Bulldogs, coached by Pop Warner, were defeated 6–0 what some claim is the very first (legal or otherwise; the legal pass starts in 1906) forward pass.

Bob Quincy notes in his 1973 book They Made the Bell Tower Chime: "John Heisman, a noted historian, wrote 30 years later that, indeed, the Tar Heels had given birth to the forward pass against the Bulldogs (UGA). It was conceived to break a scoreless deadlock and give UNC a 6–0 win. The Carolinians were in a punting situation and a Georgia rush seemed destined to block the ball. The punter, with an impromptu dash to his right, tossed the ball and it was caught by George Stephens, who ran 70 yards for a touchdown." The ball was thrown out of desperation by back Dr. Joel Whitaker. Georgia coach Pop Warner complained to the referee that the play was illegal, however, the referee let the play stand because he did not see the pass. Only 4 minutes of game time had passed when Stephens scored. Governor William Y. Atkinson attended the game.

=== Vanderbilt ===
Team	1	2	Total
• UNC	12	0	12
Vanderbilt	0	0	0

- Location: Old Dudley Field
  Nashville, Tennessee
- Game attendance: 2,000

Carolina outcoached Vanderbilt on its way to a 12–0 victory. Butler had a punt return for a touchdown. The game was called due to darkness.

=== Sewanee ===
The Sewanee Tigers fought UNC to a scoreless tie.

=== Georgia again ===
The Georgia and Carolina teams played a second time to round out the road trip and North Carolina won 10–6.

=== Washington and Lee ===
The Tar Heels defeated Washington and Lee Generals 16–0.

=== VAMC ===
North Carolina beat VAMC in Charlotte, North Carolina with 1,000 looking on. North Carolina scored three touchdowns in the first half and then scored two more touchdowns in the second half. VAMC then drove to North Carolina's three-yard line, but was stopped on downs. The final score was 5–32.

The starting lineup was Gregory (left end), Wright (left tackle), Hurley (left guard), White (center), Collier (right guard), Baird (right tackle), Merritt (right ed), Stanley (quarterback), Nicklin (left halfback), Moore (right halfback), Butler (fullback).

=== Virginia ===
Virginia defeated North Carolina 10–6 in this year's version of the South's Oldest Rivalry. Virginia thereby claims a Southern championship.

== Players ==
=== Varsity lettermen ===
First award:

- Richard Busbee
- George Phineas Butler, fullback
- Thomas Hurley, guard
- Lawrence MacRae, end
- Samuel Strang Nicklin, halfback
- Robert Thomas Stephens Steele, guard/end
- Joel D. Whitaker, Jr., quarterback
- Joseph Harvey Wright, center
- Robert Herring Wright, tackle

Second award:

- James Andrew Baird, tackle
- Harris Taylor Collier, guard
- Edwin Clarke Gregory, end
- John Allen Moore, halfback
- George Stephens, halfback

Third award:

- Thomas Allen Sharpe, center
- Benjamin Edward Stanley, quarterback

Fourth award:

- William Daniel Merritt, end
