= 1895 LSU football team =

American college football season

1895 LSU football
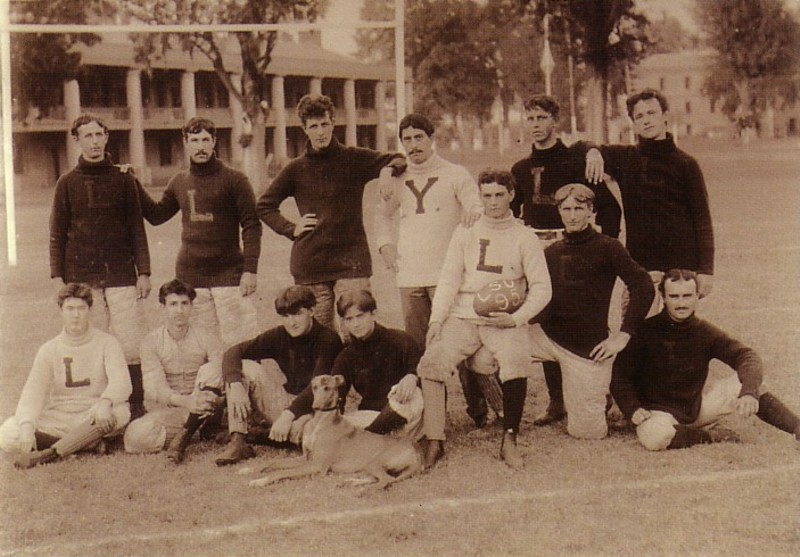

State champion
- Conference: Independent
- Record: 3–0
- Head coach: Albert Simmonds (2nd season)
- Captain: John E. Snyder
- Home stadium: State Field

1895 Southern college football independents records
	Conf.			Overall
Team	W	L	T	W		L		T
Texas		–		5	–	0	–	0
LSU		–		3	–	0	–	0
Arkansas		–		1	–	0	–	0
Henry Kendall		–		1	–	0	–	0
North Carolina		–		7	–	1	–	1
VMI		–		5	–	1	–	0
West Virginia		–		5	–	1	–	0
Centre		–		4	–	1	–	1
Virginia		–		9	–	3	–	0
Wofford		–		3	–	1	–	0
Navy		–		5	–	2	–	0
Ole Miss		–		2	–	1	–	0
South Carolina		–		2	–	1	–	0
VAMC		–		4	–	2	–	0
Tulane		–		3	–	2	–	0
Tennessee		–		3	–	2	–	1
Centenary		–		1	–	1	–	0
Guilford		–		1	–	1	–	0
Kentucky State College		–		4	–	5	–	0
North Carolina A&M		–		1	–	2	–	1
Central (KY)		–		1	–	2	–	0
Wake Forest		–		0	–	0	–	1
Marshall		–		0	–	1	–	1
Delaware		–		1	–	3	–	0
Columbian		–		0	–	1	–	1
Richmond		–		0	–	5	–	1
Catholic University		–		0	–	1	–	0
Oklahoma		–		0	–	1	–	0
Furman		–		0	–	2	–	0
Mississippi A&M		–		0	–	2	–	0

The 1895 LSU football team represented Louisiana State University (LSU) during the 1895 college football season. Coach Albert Simmonds, in his last year at LSU, guided the Tigers to an undefeated season, the first in program history. The season also featured the first home victory in LSU history with a win over Tulane in front of 1,500 spectators. A contemporary account reads "The Tulane football team, with its band of shouters and several crippled players, returned to the city yesterday morning wearing dejected faces, as a result of the defeat administered at Baton Rouge Saturday." LSU joined the Southern Intercollegiate Athletic Association (SIAA) in 1895, and began playing as part of the conference in 1896.

== Schedule ==
Date	Opponent	Site	Result	Attendance	Source
October 26	Tulane	State Field; Baton Rouge, LA (Battle for the Rag)	W 8–4	1,500	
November 2	at Centenary	Jackson, LA	W 16–6		
November 18	Alabama	State Field; Baton Rouge, LA (rivalry)	W 12–6		

== Roster ==
No.	Player	Position	Height	Weight	Hometown	High School
-	James Hughes Arrighi	Tackle	-	-	Natchez, MS	-
-	Joel B. Bateman	Guard	-	-	Franklin, LA	-
-	Armand P. Daspit	Halfback	-	-	Houma, LA	-
-	Justin C. Daspit	Halfback	-	-	Houma, LA	-
-	Harry P. Gamble	End	-	-	Natchitoches, LA	-
-	Phillip P. Huyck	Guard	-	-	Baton Rouge, LA	-
-	Sam Lambert	Fullback	-	-	Baton Rouge, LA	-
-	Wiltz M. Ledbetter	Guard	-	-	Summerfield, LA	-
-	John E. Morris	Tackle	-	-	West Monroe, LA	-
-	Gordon B. Nicholson	Halfback	-	-	Baton Rouge, LA	-
-	Lewis A. W. Quirk	Tackle	-	-	Washington, LA	-
-	John R. Salassi	Guard	-	-	French Settlement, LA	-
-	James W. Sanders	Center	-	-	Franklin, LA	-
-	Frederick H. Schneider	Guard	-	-	Lake Providence, LA	-
-	Edwin A. Scott	Left tackle	-	-	Wilson, LA	-
-	William S. Slaughter	End	-	-	Port Hudson, LA	-
-	John E. Snyder	Quarterback	-	-	Georgetown, TX	-
-	John T. Westbrook	End	-	-	Baton Rouge, LA	-

Roster from Fanbase.com and LSU: The Louisiana Tigers
