= 1895 Tennessee Volunteers football team =

American college football season

1895 Tennessee Volunteers football
- Conference: Independent
- Record: 3–2–1
- Head coach: W. B. Stokley (student coach)
- Home stadium: Baldwin Park

1895 Southern college football independents records
	Conf.			Overall
Team	W	L	T	W		L		T
Texas		–		5	–	0	–	0
LSU		–		3	–	0	–	0
Arkansas		–		1	–	0	–	0
Henry Kendall		–		1	–	0	–	0
North Carolina		–		7	–	1	–	1
VMI		–		5	–	1	–	0
West Virginia		–		5	–	1	–	0
Centre		–		4	–	1	–	1
Virginia		–		9	–	3	–	0
Wofford		–		3	–	1	–	0
Navy		–		5	–	2	–	0
Ole Miss		–		2	–	1	–	0
South Carolina		–		2	–	1	–	0
VAMC		–		4	–	2	–	0
Tulane		–		3	–	2	–	0
Tennessee		–		3	–	2	–	1
Centenary		–		1	–	1	–	0
Guilford		–		1	–	1	–	0
Kentucky State College		–		4	–	5	–	0
North Carolina A&M		–		1	–	2	–	1
Central (KY)		–		1	–	2	–	0
Wake Forest		–		0	–	0	–	1
Marshall		–		0	–	1	–	1
Delaware		–		1	–	3	–	0
Columbian		–		0	–	1	–	1
Richmond		–		0	–	5	–	1
Catholic University		–		0	–	1	–	0
Oklahoma		–		0	–	1	–	0
Furman		–		0	–	2	–	0
Mississippi A&M		–		0	–	2	–	0

The 1895 Tennessee Volunteers football team unofficially represented the University of Tennessee as an independent during the 1895 college football season. In October 1894, the Athletic Association had resolved to drop varsity football and look forward to baseball in the spring of 1895. These unofficial games, referred to as "The Lost Years", are not included in NCAA statistics or in official UT win–loss records. 1895 was the second and final student-coached team.

W. B. Stokely, a UT senior who transferred from Wake Forest University in 1894, again persuaded a group of students to form a team in the fall of 1895. Stokely, who was elected captain, gave encouragement and direction to the other players. Even though the institution chose not to be represented officially on the gridiron in 1895, as in 1894, Stokely and his unofficial team kept football interest alive during this period when almost certainly it otherwise would have been allowed to lapse completely.

== Schedule ==
Date	Opponent	Site	Result	Source
October 19	vs. Knoxville YMCA	Baldwin Park; Knoxville, TN	W 4–0	
November 2	Maryville (TN)	Baldwin Park; Knoxville, TN	T 6–6	
November 4	at Bingham School	Allandale Field; Asheville, NC	W 12–0	
November 14	at Fort McPherson	Athletic Park; Atlanta, GA	L 0–28	
November 28	at St. Albans School (VA)	Bristol, TN	L 0–38	
November 30	Tennessee Docs	Baldwin Park; Knoxville, TN	W 40–0	
