= 1895 Marshall Thundering Herd football team =

American college football season

1895 Marshall Thundering Herd football
- Conference: Independent
- Record: 0–1–1
- Head coach: None
- Home stadium: Central Field

1895 Southern college football independents records
	Conf.			Overall
Team	W	L	T	W		L		T
Texas		–		5	–	0	–	0
LSU		–		3	–	0	–	0
Arkansas		–		1	–	0	–	0
Henry Kendall		–		1	–	0	–	0
North Carolina		–		7	–	1	–	1
VMI		–		5	–	1	–	0
West Virginia		–		5	–	1	–	0
Centre		–		4	–	1	–	1
Virginia		–		9	–	3	–	0
Wofford		–		3	–	1	–	0
Navy		–		5	–	2	–	0
Ole Miss		–		2	–	1	–	0
South Carolina		–		2	–	1	–	0
VAMC		–		4	–	2	–	0
Tulane		–		3	–	2	–	0
Tennessee		–		3	–	2	–	1
Centenary		–		1	–	1	–	0
Guilford		–		1	–	1	–	0
Kentucky State College		–		4	–	5	–	0
North Carolina A&M		–		1	–	2	–	1
Central (KY)		–		1	–	2	–	0
Wake Forest		–		0	–	0	–	1
Marshall		–		0	–	1	–	1
Delaware		–		1	–	3	–	0
Columbian		–		0	–	1	–	1
Richmond		–		0	–	5	–	1
Catholic University		–		0	–	1	–	0
Oklahoma		–		0	–	1	–	0
Furman		–		0	–	2	–	0
Mississippi A&M		–		0	–	2	–	0

The 1895 Marshall Thundering Herd football team represented Marshall University in the 1895 college football season. In its inaugural season, the team did not have a coach, and were outscored by their opponents 0–36 in two games.

Marshall would not field a team the following year, returning for the 1897 season.

== Schedule ==
Date	Opponent	Site	Result
November 14	Ashland High School	Central Field; Huntington, WV	L 0–36
November 28	Kingsbury High School ^{†}	Central Field; Huntington, WV	T 0–0
^{†}Homecoming

== Game summaries ==
=== Ashland High School ===
Ashland at Marshall (Inaugural Game)

Team	1	2	Total
• Ashland	24	12	36
Marshall	0	0	0

- Date: November 14
- Location: Central Field • Huntington, WV

This game was the first in Marshall school history. The Ashland football team outweighed the Marshall squad by an average of 163 pounds to 135.

=== Kingsbury High School ===
Kingsbury at Marshall (homecoming)

Team	1	2	Total
Kingsbury	0	0	0
Marshall	0	0	0

- Date: November 28
- Location: Central Field • Huntington, WV

Kingsbury High School, from Ironton, Ohio, served as the opponents in Marshall's first ever homecoming football game.
