= 1895 Navy Midshipmen football team =

American college football season

1895 Navy Midshipmen football
- Conference: Independent
- Record: 5–2
- Head coach: Matthew McClung (1st season)
- Captain: Ed Macauley
- Home stadium: Worden Field

1895 Southern college football independents records
| | Conf. | | | Overall |
| Team | W | L | T | W | | L | | T |
|---|---|---|---|---|---|---|---|---|
| Texas | | – | | 5 | – | 0 | – | 0 |
| LSU | | – | | 3 | – | 0 | – | 0 |
| Arkansas | | – | | 1 | – | 0 | – | 0 |
| Henry Kendall | | – | | 1 | – | 0 | – | 0 |
| North Carolina | | – | | 7 | – | 1 | – | 1 |
| VMI | | – | | 5 | – | 1 | – | 0 |
| West Virginia | | – | | 5 | – | 1 | – | 0 |
| Centre | | – | | 4 | – | 1 | – | 1 |
| Virginia | | – | | 9 | – | 3 | – | 0 |
| Wofford | | – | | 3 | – | 1 | – | 0 |
| Navy | | – | | 5 | – | 2 | – | 0 |
| Ole Miss | | – | | 2 | – | 1 | – | 0 |
| South Carolina | | – | | 2 | – | 1 | – | 0 |
| VAMC | | – | | 4 | – | 2 | – | 0 |
| Tulane | | – | | 3 | – | 2 | – | 0 |
| Tennessee | | – | | 3 | – | 2 | – | 1 |
| Centenary | | – | | 1 | – | 1 | – | 0 |
| Guilford | | – | | 1 | – | 1 | – | 0 |
| Kentucky State College | | – | | 4 | – | 5 | – | 0 |
| North Carolina A&M | | – | | 1 | – | 2 | – | 1 |
| Central (KY) | | – | | 1 | – | 2 | – | 0 |
| Wake Forest | | – | | 0 | – | 0 | – | 1 |
| Marshall | | – | | 0 | – | 1 | – | 1 |
| Delaware | | – | | 1 | – | 3 | – | 0 |
| Columbian | | – | | 0 | – | 1 | – | 1 |
| Richmond | | – | | 0 | – | 5 | – | 1 |
| Catholic University | | – | | 0 | – | 1 | – | 0 |
| Oklahoma | | – | | 0 | – | 1 | – | 0 |
| Furman | | – | | 0 | – | 2 | – | 0 |
| Mississippi A&M | | – | | 0 | – | 2 | – | 0 |

The 1895 Navy Midshipmen football team represented the United States Naval Academy during the 1895 college football season. In their first and only season under head coach Matthew McClung, the Midshipmen compiled a 5–2 record and outscored their opponents by a combined score of 152 to 16. The Army–Navy Game was canceled due to Presidential cabinet order.

== Schedule ==
| Date | Opponent | Site | Result |
|---|---|---|---|
| October 5 | Elizabeth Athletic Club | Worden Field; Annapolis, MD | W 6–0 |
| October 12 | New Jersey Athletic Club | Worden Field; Annapolis, MD | W 34–0 |
| October 19 | Franklin & Marshall | Worden Field; Annapolis, MD | W 68–0 |
| October 26 | Carlisle | Worden Field; Annapolis, MD | W 34–0 |
| November 2 | Virginia | Worden Field; Annapolis, MD | W 1–0* |
| November 9 | Orange Athletic Club | Worden Field; Annapolis, MD | L 6–10 |
| November 16 | Lehigh | Worden Field; Annapolis, MD | L 4–6 |

* Virginia forfeited due to major fire at the University of Virginia.
