= 1895 Richmond Spiders football team =

American college football season

1895 Richmond Spiders football
- Conference: Independent
- Record: 0–5–1
- Head coach: Dana Rucker (4th season)
- Captain: Joseph Sallade

1895 Southern college football independents records
	Conf.			Overall
Team	W	L	T	W		L		T
Texas		–		5	–	0	–	0
LSU		–		3	–	0	–	0
Arkansas		–		1	–	0	–	0
Henry Kendall		–		1	–	0	–	0
North Carolina		–		7	–	1	–	1
VMI		–		5	–	1	–	0
West Virginia		–		5	–	1	–	0
Centre		–		4	–	1	–	1
Virginia		–		9	–	3	–	0
Wofford		–		3	–	1	–	0
Navy		–		5	–	2	–	0
Ole Miss		–		2	–	1	–	0
South Carolina		–		2	–	1	–	0
VAMC		–		4	–	2	–	0
Tulane		–		3	–	2	–	0
Tennessee		–		3	–	2	–	1
Centenary		–		1	–	1	–	0
Guilford		–		1	–	1	–	0
Kentucky State College		–		4	–	5	–	0
North Carolina A&M		–		1	–	2	–	1
Central (KY)		–		1	–	2	–	0
Wake Forest		–		0	–	0	–	1
Marshall		–		0	–	1	–	1
Delaware		–		1	–	3	–	0
Columbian		–		0	–	1	–	1
Richmond		–		0	–	5	–	1
Catholic University		–		0	–	1	–	0
Oklahoma		–		0	–	1	–	0
Furman		–		0	–	2	–	0
Mississippi A&M		–		0	–	2	–	0

The 1895 Richmond Colts football team was an American football team that represented Richmond College—now known as the University of Richmond—as an independent during the 1895 college football season. Led by Dana Rucker in his fourth and final season as head coach, Richmond compiled a record of 0–5–1. For the second straight season, the team was winless.

== Schedule ==
Date	Time	Opponent	Site	Result	Source
October 10		Hampton A.C.	Richmond, VA	L 4–16	
October 18	4:00 p.m.	at North Carolina A&M	Athletic Park; Raleigh, NC	L 0–6	
October 19		at North Carolina	Chapel Hill, NC	L 0–34	
November 2		Hampden–Sydney	Richmond, VA	T 0–0	
November 11		at VMI	Lexington, VA (rivalry)	L 0–44	
November 12		at Virginia	Madison Hall Field; Charlottesville, VA	L 0–62	
