= 1895 VMI Keydets football team =

American college football season

1895 VMI Keydets football
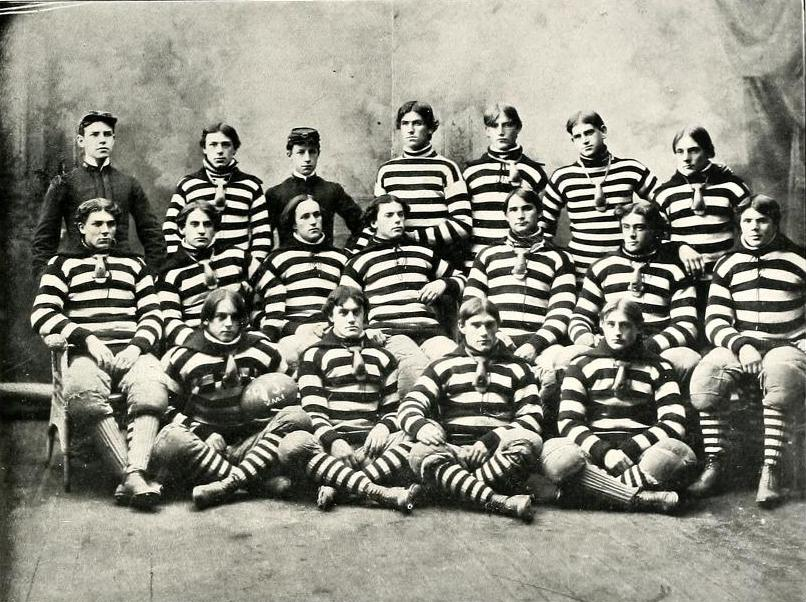
- Conference: Independent
- Record: 5–1
- Head coach: George W. Bryant (1st season)

1895 Southern college football independents records
	Conf.			Overall
Team	W	L	T	W		L		T
Texas		–		5	–	0	–	0
LSU		–		3	–	0	–	0
Arkansas		–		1	–	0	–	0
Henry Kendall		–		1	–	0	–	0
North Carolina		–		7	–	1	–	1
VMI		–		5	–	1	–	0
West Virginia		–		5	–	1	–	0
Centre		–		4	–	1	–	1
Virginia		–		9	–	3	–	0
Wofford		–		3	–	1	–	0
Navy		–		5	–	2	–	0
Ole Miss		–		2	–	1	–	0
South Carolina		–		2	–	1	–	0
VAMC		–		4	–	2	–	0
Tulane		–		3	–	2	–	0
Tennessee		–		3	–	2	–	1
Centenary		–		1	–	1	–	0
Guilford		–		1	–	1	–	0
Kentucky State College		–		4	–	5	–	0
North Carolina A&M		–		1	–	2	–	1
Central (KY)		–		1	–	2	–	0
Wake Forest		–		0	–	0	–	1
Marshall		–		0	–	1	–	1
Delaware		–		1	–	3	–	0
Columbian		–		0	–	1	–	1
Richmond		–		0	–	5	–	1
Catholic University		–		0	–	1	–	0
Oklahoma		–		0	–	1	–	0
Furman		–		0	–	2	–	0
Mississippi A&M		–		0	–	2	–	0

The 1895 VMI Keydets football team represented the Virginia Military Institute (VMI) in their fifth season of organized football. The Keydets went 5–1, which was the program's fifth winning season in five years.

== Schedule ==
Date	Time	Opponent	Site	Result	Attendance	Source
October 12		at Washington and Lee	Lexington, VA	W 18–0		
October 25		vs. North Carolina A&M	Atlanta, GA	W 42–6		
November 2		Washington and Lee	Lexington, VA	W 30–0		
November 11		Richmond	Lexington, VA (rivalry)	W 44–0		
November 17		Roanoke	Lexington, VA	W 26–0		
November 28	11:30am	vs. VAMC	Lynchburg, Virginia (rivalry)	L 4–6	3,000	
