= 1895 Virginia Orange and Blue football team =

American college football season

1895 Virginia Orange and Blue football
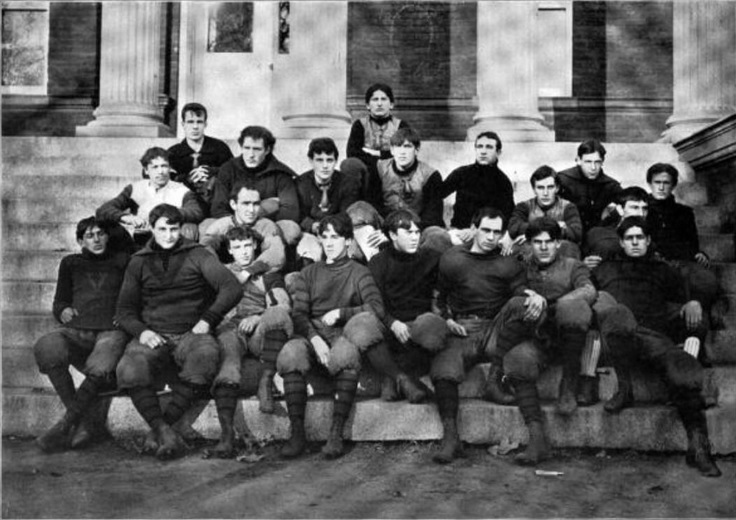

Southern champion
- Conference: Independent
- Record: 9–3
- Head coach: Harry Arista Mackey (1st season)
- Captain: John Penton
- Home stadium: Madison Hall Field

1895 Southern college football independents records
	Conf.			Overall
Team	W	L	T	W		L		T
Texas		–		5	–	0	–	0
LSU		–		3	–	0	–	0
Arkansas		–		1	–	0	–	0
Henry Kendall		–		1	–	0	–	0
North Carolina		–		7	–	1	–	1
VMI		–		5	–	1	–	0
West Virginia		–		5	–	1	–	0
Centre		–		4	–	1	–	1
Virginia		–		9	–	3	–	0
Wofford		–		3	–	1	–	0
Navy		–		5	–	2	–	0
Ole Miss		–		2	–	1	–	0
South Carolina		–		2	–	1	–	0
VAMC		–		4	–	2	–	0
Tulane		–		3	–	2	–	0
Tennessee		–		3	–	2	–	1
Centenary		–		1	–	1	–	0
Guilford		–		1	–	1	–	0
Kentucky State College		–		4	–	5	–	0
North Carolina A&M		–		1	–	2	–	1
Central (KY)		–		1	–	2	–	0
Wake Forest		–		0	–	0	–	1
Marshall		–		0	–	1	–	1
Delaware		–		1	–	3	–	0
Columbian		–		0	–	1	–	1
Richmond		–		0	–	5	–	1
Catholic University		–		0	–	1	–	0
Oklahoma		–		0	–	1	–	0
Furman		–		0	–	2	–	0
Mississippi A&M		–		0	–	2	–	0

The 1895 Virginia Orange and Blue football team represented the University of Virginia as an independent during the 1895 college football season. Led by first-year head coach Harry Arista Mackey, the team went 9–3 and claims a Southern championship.

== Schedule ==
Date	Time	Opponent	Site	Result	Attendance	Source
October 2		Miller School	Madison Hall Field; Charlottesville, VA	W 30–0		
October 5	4:12 p.m.	VAMC	Madison Hall Field; Charlottesville, VA (rivalry)	W 36–0	300	
October 9		vs. Princeton	Catonsville Country Club; Catonsville, MD	L 0–36	3,000	
October 12		Maryland Athletic Club	Madison Hall Field; Charlottesville, VA	W 20–0		
October 19		at Penn	Franklin Field; Philadelphia, PA	L 0–54	1,500	
October 26		Gallaudet	Madison Hall Field; Charlottesville, VA	W 16–6		
October 29		Roanoke	Madison Hall Field; Charlottesville, VA	W 14–0		
November 2		at Navy	Worden Field; Annapolis, MD	L 0–1*		
November 11		St. Albans	Madison Hall Field; Charlottesville, VA	W 14–4		
November 12		Richmond	Madison Hall Field; Charlottesville, VA	W 62–0		
November 16	3:00 p.m.	vs. Vanderbilt	Athletic Park; Atlanta, GA	W 6–4	2,500	
November 28	2:30 p.m.	vs. North Carolina	West-End Park; Richmond, VA (South's Oldest Rivalry)	W 6–0	> 6,000	

*Virginia forfeited due to a major fire at UVA.

== See also ==
- 1895 College Football All-Southern Team
