= 1895 Mississippi A&M Aggies football team =

American college football season

1895 Mississippi A&M Aggies football
- Conference: Independent
- Record: 0–2
- Head coach: W. M. Matthews (1st season)

1895 Southern college football independents records
	Conf.			Overall
Team	W	L	T	W		L		T
Texas		–		5	–	0	–	0
LSU		–		3	–	0	–	0
Arkansas		–		1	–	0	–	0
Henry Kendall		–		1	–	0	–	0
North Carolina		–		7	–	1	–	1
VMI		–		5	–	1	–	0
West Virginia		–		5	–	1	–	0
Centre		–		4	–	1	–	1
Virginia		–		9	–	3	–	0
Wofford		–		3	–	1	–	0
Navy		–		5	–	2	–	0
Ole Miss		–		2	–	1	–	0
South Carolina		–		2	–	1	–	0
VAMC		–		4	–	2	–	0
Tulane		–		3	–	2	–	0
Tennessee		–		3	–	2	–	1
Centenary		–		1	–	1	–	0
Guilford		–		1	–	1	–	0
Kentucky State College		–		4	–	5	–	0
North Carolina A&M		–		1	–	2	–	1
Central (KY)		–		1	–	2	–	0
Wake Forest		–		0	–	0	–	1
Marshall		–		0	–	1	–	1
Delaware		–		1	–	3	–	0
Columbian		–		0	–	1	–	1
Richmond		–		0	–	5	–	1
Catholic University		–		0	–	1	–	0
Oklahoma		–		0	–	1	–	0
Furman		–		0	–	2	–	0
Mississippi A&M		–		0	–	2	–	0

The 1895 Mississippi A&M Aggies football team represented Mississippi Agricultural & Mechanical College—now known as Mississippi State University—as independent during the 1895 college football season. Led by W. M. Matthews in his first and only season as head coach, the Aggies compiled a record of 0–2.

== Schedule ==
Date	Opponent	Site	Result
November 16	at Union (TN)	Jackson, TN	L 0–21
December 7	at Memphis Athletic Club	Memphis, TN	L 0–16
