= 1895 College Football All-Southern Team =

American all-star college football team

The 1895 College Football All-Southern Team consists of American football players selected to the College Football All-Southern Teams selected by various organizations in 1895. North Carolina running back George Stephens caught the first forward pass in the history of the sport.

== All-Southerns of 1895 ==
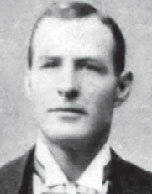
John Penton

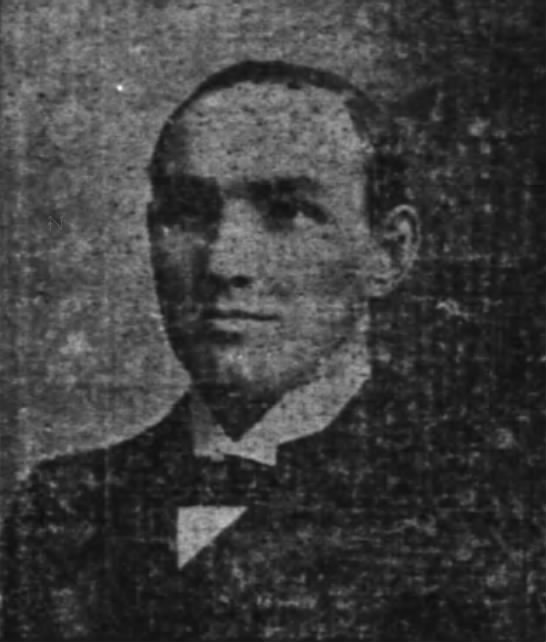
Arlie C. Jones

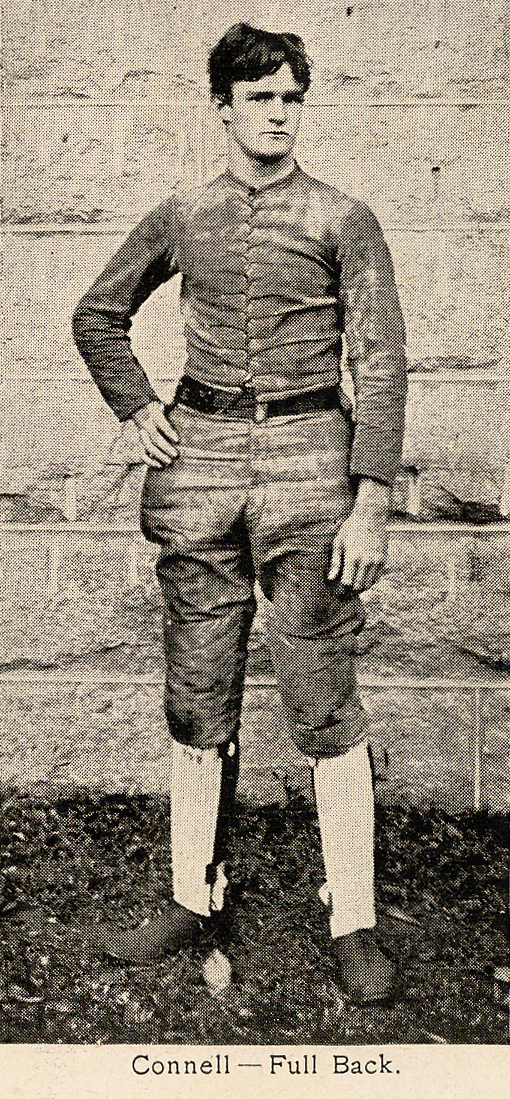
Phil Connell

=== Ends ===
- Robert H. Mudd, Virginia (WC)
- Willie Merritt, North Carolina (WC)
- Cook, Centre (ACR)
- J. Cleves Short, Kentucky State (ACR)
- Brink, Central (ACR)

=== Tackles ===
- George L. Hicks, Virginia (WC)
- Jim Baird, North Carolina (WC)
- James W. Carnahan, Kentucky State (ACR)

=== Guards ===
- John Penton, Virginia (WC)
- David Kirkpatrick, North Carolina (WC)
- Staples, Centre (ACR)
- Glore, Louisville A. C. (ACR)

=== Centers ===
- George Burlingame, Virginia (WC)
- Walter "Pete" Murphy, North Carolina (WC-s)

=== Quarterbacks ===
- Saunders Taylor, Virginia (WC)

=== Halfbacks ===
- Arlie C. Jones, Virginia (WC)
- George Stephens, North Carolina (WC)
- Colvin, Centre (ACR)
- Frew, Louisville A. C. (ACR)

=== Fullbacks ===
- Oscar Lang, Virginia (WC)
- Phil Connell, Vanderbilt (WC-s)
- Swango, Louisville A. C. (ACR)
- Gains, Central (ACR)
- McDonald, Louisville A. C. (ACR)

=== Unlisted ===
- Joe Frasier, Kentucky State (ACR)

== Key ==
WC = selected by "Whitper Casney" (a play on Caspar Whitney) in the University of Virginia's College Topics. It had substitutes, denoted with a small S. It seems the team also picked players from prior years including 1894, at least.

ACR = selected by A. C. Robinson.

== See also ==
- South's Oldest Rivalry
