= 1895 Oklahoma Sooners football team =

American college football season

1895 Oklahoma Sooners football
- Conference: Independent
- Record: 0–1
- Head coach: John A. Harts (1st season)

1895 Southern college football independents records
	Conf.			Overall
Team	W	L	T	W		L		T
Texas		–		5	–	0	–	0
LSU		–		3	–	0	–	0
Arkansas		–		1	–	0	–	0
Henry Kendall		–		1	–	0	–	0
North Carolina		–		7	–	1	–	1
VMI		–		5	–	1	–	0
West Virginia		–		5	–	1	–	0
Centre		–		4	–	1	–	1
Virginia		–		9	–	3	–	0
Wofford		–		3	–	1	–	0
Navy		–		5	–	2	–	0
Ole Miss		–		2	–	1	–	0
South Carolina		–		2	–	1	–	0
VAMC		–		4	–	2	–	0
Tulane		–		3	–	2	–	0
Tennessee		–		3	–	2	–	1
Centenary		–		1	–	1	–	0
Guilford		–		1	–	1	–	0
Kentucky State College		–		4	–	5	–	0
North Carolina A&M		–		1	–	2	–	1
Central (KY)		–		1	–	2	–	0
Wake Forest		–		0	–	0	–	1
Marshall		–		0	–	1	–	1
Delaware		–		1	–	3	–	0
Columbian		–		0	–	1	–	1
Richmond		–		0	–	5	–	1
Catholic University		–		0	–	1	–	0
Oklahoma		–		0	–	1	–	0
Furman		–		0	–	2	–	0
Mississippi A&M		–		0	–	2	–	0

The 1895 Oklahoma Sooners football team represented University of Oklahoma as an independent during the 1895 college football season and was its first football team ever fielded by the school. The team completed its inaugural season with a 0–1 record. The Sooners played their first football game in history against a team from Oklahoma City and lost by a final score of 34–0. This was the program's only season under the guidance of head coach John A. Harts, who later left the school to become a gold prospector.

== Schedule ==
Date	Opponent	Site	Result	Source
December 14	Oklahoma City team	University campus; Norman, Oklahoma Territory	L 0–34	

== Roster ==
1895 Oklahoma Sooners football
Fred Bene; Jasper Clapham; Bert Dunn; J. C. Evans	John A. Harts; Bert Long; Newt Medlock; Fred Perry	John Prickett; R. Risinger; Royter

== See also ==
- List of the first college football game in each US state
