= 1895 Arkansas Industrial Cardinals football team =

American college football season

1895 Arkansas Industrial Cardinals football
- Conference: Independent
- Record: 1–0
- Head coach: John C. Futrall (2nd season)
- Captain: Herbert Fishback

1895 Southern college football independents records
	Conf.			Overall
Team	W	L	T	W		L		T
Texas		–		5	–	0	–	0
LSU		–		3	–	0	–	0
Arkansas		–		1	–	0	–	0
Henry Kendall		–		1	–	0	–	0
North Carolina		–		7	–	1	–	1
VMI		–		5	–	1	–	0
West Virginia		–		5	–	1	–	0
Centre		–		4	–	1	–	1
Virginia		–		9	–	3	–	0
Wofford		–		3	–	1	–	0
Navy		–		5	–	2	–	0
Ole Miss		–		2	–	1	–	0
South Carolina		–		2	–	1	–	0
VAMC		–		4	–	2	–	0
Tulane		–		3	–	2	–	0
Tennessee		–		3	–	2	–	1
Centenary		–		1	–	1	–	0
Guilford		–		1	–	1	–	0
Kentucky State College		–		4	–	5	–	0
North Carolina A&M		–		1	–	2	–	1
Central (KY)		–		1	–	2	–	0
Wake Forest		–		0	–	0	–	1
Marshall		–		0	–	1	–	1
Delaware		–		1	–	3	–	0
Columbian		–		0	–	1	–	1
Richmond		–		0	–	5	–	1
Catholic University		–		0	–	1	–	0
Oklahoma		–		0	–	1	–	0
Furman		–		0	–	2	–	0
Mississippi A&M		–		0	–	2	–	0

The 1895 Arkansas Industrial Cardinals football team represented the University of Arkansas during the 1895 college football season. During the 1895 season, Arkansas Industrial played no intercollegiate football games. Its only game was against Fort Smith High School, resulting in a 30–0 victory for Arkansas.

== Schedule ==
Date	Opponent	Site	Result
October 12	Fort Smith High School	Fayetteville, AR	W 30–0
