= 1895 Texas Longhorns football team =

American college football season

1895 Texas Longhorns football
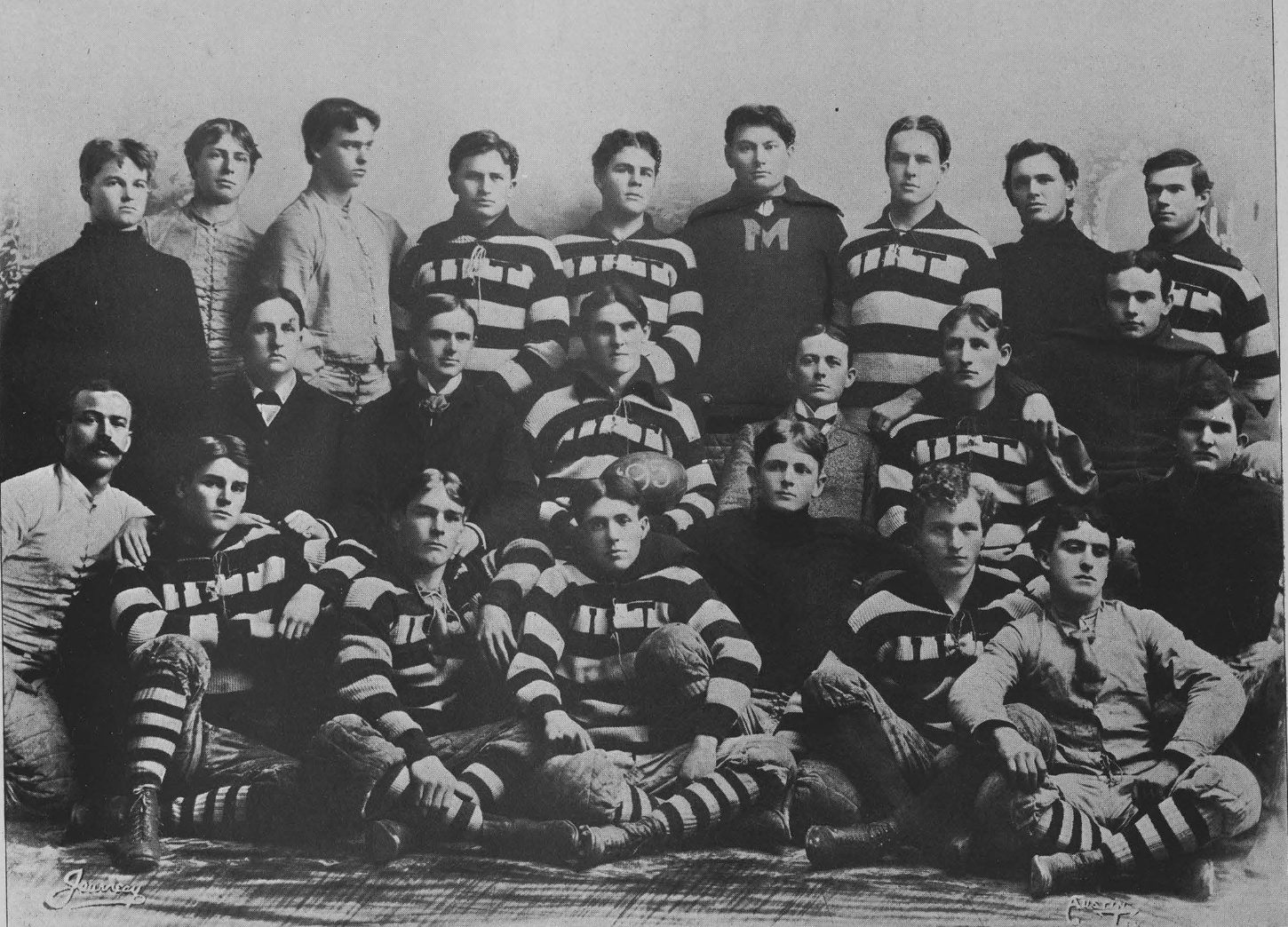
- Conference: Independent
- Record: 5–0
- Head coach: Frank Crawford (1st season)
- Captains: Ray McLane; Wallace Ralston
- Home stadium: Hyde Park

1895 Southern college football independents records
	Conf.			Overall
Team	W	L	T	W		L		T
Texas		–		5	–	0	–	0
LSU		–		3	–	0	–	0
Arkansas		–		1	–	0	–	0
Henry Kendall		–		1	–	0	–	0
North Carolina		–		7	–	1	–	1
VMI		–		5	–	1	–	0
West Virginia		–		5	–	1	–	0
Centre		–		4	–	1	–	1
Virginia		–		9	–	3	–	0
Wofford		–		3	–	1	–	0
Navy		–		5	–	2	–	0
Ole Miss		–		2	–	1	–	0
South Carolina		–		2	–	1	–	0
VAMC		–		4	–	2	–	0
Tulane		–		3	–	2	–	0
Tennessee		–		3	–	2	–	1
Centenary		–		1	–	1	–	0
Guilford		–		1	–	1	–	0
Kentucky State College		–		4	–	5	–	0
North Carolina A&M		–		1	–	2	–	1
Central (KY)		–		1	–	2	–	0
Wake Forest		–		0	–	0	–	1
Marshall		–		0	–	1	–	1
Delaware		–		1	–	3	–	0
Columbian		–		0	–	1	–	1
Richmond		–		0	–	5	–	1
Catholic University		–		0	–	1	–	0
Oklahoma		–		0	–	1	–	0
Furman		–		0	–	2	–	0
Mississippi A&M		–		0	–	2	–	0

The 1895 Texas Longhorns football team represented the University of Texas as an independent during the 1895 college football season. Led by Frank Crawford in his first only season as head coach, Texas compiled a record of 5–0.

== Schedule ==
Date	Time	Opponent	Site	Result	Attendance	Source
November 11		at Dallas University	Dallas, TX	W 10–0		
November 16	3:00 p.m.	Austin YMCA	Hyde Park; Austin, TX	W 24–0		
November 23	3:30 p.m.	Tulane	Hyde Park; Austin, TX	W 16–0	300–600	
November 28	3:30 p.m.	San Antonio Town Team	Hyde Park; Austin, TX	W 38–0		
February 22, 1896	3:45 p.m.	at Galveston	Beach Park; Galveston, TX	W 8–0		

== Personnel ==
Lettermen

Player	Position	Games started (Note: Does not include the Dallas and YMCA games due to incomplete records.)	Home town	Weight	Age	Class	Prior experience	Notes
Solomon F. Acree	Tackle	0	McGregor, Texas	150	20	Jr. (B. Sc.)		(Note: Solomon Farley Acree would go on to become a biochemist. The Acree–Rosenheim reaction is named in part for him.)
Alex G. Camp	Substitute	1	Dallas, Texas	135	18	Fr. (B. Lit.)		(Note: As a civic leader in 1920s Dallas, Alexander Gerald Camp helped found the Citizens Charter Association which pushed the city to adopt a Council-Manager form of government.)
James R. Caperton	Halfback	3	St. Elmo, Texas	160	20	Fr. (B. Lit.)		
Ward Dabney	Substitute	0	Bonham, Texas	160	19	Jr. (Law)		
Andrew W. Denmark	Tackle	2	Rancho, Texas	175	21	Fr. (B. Lit.)		
William R. Denton	Center	2	West, Texas	184	22	Fr. (B. Lit.)		
Walter W. Fisher	Quarterback	2	Austin, Texas	145	19	Fr. (B. A.)		
David S. Furman	Halfback	2	Belton, Texas	150	21	Sr. (B. A.)	Varsity (1893–94)	
Julius F. House	Guard	2	Dallas, Texas	180		Jr. (Law)		
"Snaky" Jones	End	3	Smithville, Texas	142	20	Jr. (Law)	VMI (1894)	(Note: James Slaughter Jones at Texas Legislative Reference Library)
John F. Maverick	Fullback	2	San Antonio, Texas	163	21	Special (Chem.)	Varsity (1894)	
Ray M. McLane	End	1	Laredo, Texas	155	19	Fr. (Engi.)	Varsity (1893–94)	(Note: McLane was a co-founder of Longhorns football in 1893.)
Jacob E. Michalson	Substitute	0	Dallas, Texas	130	20	Jr. (B. Lit.)	Varsity (1894)	
Victor C. Moore	End	0	Austin, Texas	180	21	Jr. (Law)	Varsity (1893–94)	(Note: The 1896 Cactus yearbook lists Moore as a "Referee" for the 1895 season, nevertheless he was awarded a retroactive letter for the season.)
"Dan" Parker	Guard	1	Calvert, Texas	172	22	Fr. (B. A.)		(Note: Older brother of R. D. Parker.)
William W. Ralston	Tackle	2	Austin, Texas	155	20	Fr. (B. Sc.)	Varsity (1894)	
"Chub" Wortham	Guard	1	Paris, Texas	180	18	Fr. (B. Sc.)		(Note: Full name Richard Walter Wortham.)

Non-letterwinners

Player	Position	Games started	Home town	Weight	Age	Class	Prior experience	Notes
James S. Clarke	Center	3	Boerne, Texas	175		Jr. (Law)		
Richard C. Harris	Substitute	0	Comanche, Texas	180	20	Jr. (B. A.)		
Arthur P. Homer	Fullback	0	Galveston, Texas	180	19	Fr. (B. Sc.)		
John A. P. O'Keefe	Halfback	1	Honey Grove, Texas	150	22	Sr. (Law)	Sub (1894)	
R. D. Parker	Substitute	0	Calvert, Texas	160	17	So. (Engi.)	Varsity (1894)	(Note: Richard Denny "R. D." Parker was the younger brother of Daniel "Dan" Parker. All-time lettermen lists include only Dan from 1894–1897, but the 1895 Cactus lists "R. D. Parker" as a substitute in 1894.)

Manager

- Walter Crawford, Junior (Law) (Note: Crawford was also the manager of the inaugural 1893 team.)

== Notes ==
Biographical
