= 1895 Tulane Olive and Blue football team =

American college football season

1895 Tulane Olive and Blue football
- Conference: Independent
- Record: 3–2
- Head coach: T. L. Bayne (2nd season)
- Captain: Alfred Woods
- Home stadium: Tulane Athletic Field

1895 Southern college football independents records
	Conf.			Overall
Team	W	L	T	W		L		T
Texas		–		5	–	0	–	0
LSU		–		3	–	0	–	0
Arkansas		–		1	–	0	–	0
Henry Kendall		–		1	–	0	–	0
North Carolina		–		7	–	1	–	1
VMI		–		5	–	1	–	0
West Virginia		–		5	–	1	–	0
Centre		–		4	–	1	–	1
Virginia		–		9	–	3	–	0
Wofford		–		3	–	1	–	0
Navy		–		5	–	2	–	0
Ole Miss		–		2	–	1	–	0
South Carolina		–		2	–	1	–	0
VAMC		–		4	–	2	–	0
Tulane		–		3	–	2	–	0
Tennessee		–		3	–	2	–	1
Centenary		–		1	–	1	–	0
Guilford		–		1	–	1	–	0
Kentucky State College		–		4	–	5	–	0
North Carolina A&M		–		1	–	2	–	1
Central (KY)		–		1	–	2	–	0
Wake Forest		–		0	–	0	–	1
Marshall		–		0	–	1	–	1
Delaware		–		1	–	3	–	0
Columbian		–		0	–	1	–	1
Richmond		–		0	–	5	–	1
Catholic University		–		0	–	1	–	0
Oklahoma		–		0	–	1	–	0
Furman		–		0	–	2	–	0
Mississippi A&M		–		0	–	2	–	0

The 1895 Tulane Olive and Blue football team was an American football team that represented Tulane University as an independent during the 1895 college football season. In their second year under head coach T. L. Bayne, the team compiled an overall record of 3–2.

== Schedule ==
Date	Time	Opponent	Site	Result	Attendance	Source
October 26		at LSU	State Field; Baton Rouge, LA (rivalry)	L 4–8	1,500	
November 9		Southern Athletic Club Reserves	Tulane Athletic Field; New Orleans, LA	W 12–0		
November 16		Alabama	Tulane Athletic Field; New Orleans, LA	W 22–0	1,000	
November 23	3:30 p.m.	at Texas	Hyde Park; Austin, TX	L 0–16	600	
November 28		Ole Miss	Tulane Athletic Field; New Orleans, LA (rivalry)	W 28–4		
