= 1895 South Carolina Gamecocks football team =

American college football season

1895 South Carolina Gamecocks football
- Conference: Independent
- Record: 2–1
- Head coach: None
- Captain: F. M. Bryan
- Home stadium: Shandon Park

1895 Southern college football independents records
| | Conf. | | | Overall |
| Team | W | L | T | W | | L | | T |
|---|---|---|---|---|---|---|---|---|
| Texas | | – | | 5 | – | 0 | – | 0 |
| LSU | | – | | 3 | – | 0 | – | 0 |
| Arkansas | | – | | 1 | – | 0 | – | 0 |
| Henry Kendall | | – | | 1 | – | 0 | – | 0 |
| North Carolina | | – | | 7 | – | 1 | – | 1 |
| VMI | | – | | 5 | – | 1 | – | 0 |
| West Virginia | | – | | 5 | – | 1 | – | 0 |
| Centre | | – | | 4 | – | 1 | – | 1 |
| Virginia | | – | | 9 | – | 3 | – | 0 |
| Wofford | | – | | 3 | – | 1 | – | 0 |
| Navy | | – | | 5 | – | 2 | – | 0 |
| Ole Miss | | – | | 2 | – | 1 | – | 0 |
| South Carolina | | – | | 2 | – | 1 | – | 0 |
| VAMC | | – | | 4 | – | 2 | – | 0 |
| Tulane | | – | | 3 | – | 2 | – | 0 |
| Tennessee | | – | | 3 | – | 2 | – | 1 |
| Centenary | | – | | 1 | – | 1 | – | 0 |
| Guilford | | – | | 1 | – | 1 | – | 0 |
| Kentucky State College | | – | | 4 | – | 5 | – | 0 |
| North Carolina A&M | | – | | 1 | – | 2 | – | 1 |
| Central (KY) | | – | | 1 | – | 2 | – | 0 |
| Wake Forest | | – | | 0 | – | 0 | – | 1 |
| Marshall | | – | | 0 | – | 1 | – | 1 |
| Delaware | | – | | 1 | – | 3 | – | 0 |
| Columbian | | – | | 0 | – | 1 | – | 1 |
| Richmond | | – | | 0 | – | 5 | – | 1 |
| Catholic University | | – | | 0 | – | 1 | – | 0 |
| Oklahoma | | – | | 0 | – | 1 | – | 0 |
| Furman | | – | | 0 | – | 2 | – | 0 |
| Mississippi A&M | | – | | 0 | – | 2 | – | 0 |

The 1895 South Carolina Jaguars football team represented South Carolina College—now known as the University of South Carolina–as an independent during the 1895 college football season. South Carolina compiled a record of 2–1. This was the first winning season in program history.

== Schedule ==
| Date | Opponent | Site | Result |
|---|---|---|---|
| November 2 | Columbia Athletic Association | Shandon Park; Columbia, SC | W 20–0 |
| November 8 | Furman | Shandon Park; Columbia, SC | W 14–10 |
| November 14 | Wofford | Shandon Park; Columbia, SC | L 0–10 |
