= David Kirkpatrick =

David Kirkpatrick may refer to:

- David Kirkpatrick (author) (born 1953), author of The Facebook Effect (2010)
- David Kirkpatrick (producer) (born 1951), American film producer, studio executive and screenwriter
- David D. Kirkpatrick, journalist; Cairo Bureau Chief of The New York Times
- David G. Kirkpatrick, Canadian academic and computer scientist
- Slim Dusty (1927–2003), stage name of David Gordon Kirkpatrick; Australian country-music singer-songwriter and producer
- David Kirkpatrick (American football) (1870-1939), American college football player
