= 1895 Furman Baptists football team =

American college football season

1895 Furman Baptists football
- Conference: Independent
- Record: 0–2
- Head coach: H. P. Young (4th season)

1895 Southern college football independents records
| | Conf. | | | Overall |
| Team | W | L | T | W | | L | | T |
|---|---|---|---|---|---|---|---|---|
| Texas | | – | | 5 | – | 0 | – | 0 |
| LSU | | – | | 3 | – | 0 | – | 0 |
| Arkansas | | – | | 1 | – | 0 | – | 0 |
| Henry Kendall | | – | | 1 | – | 0 | – | 0 |
| North Carolina | | – | | 7 | – | 1 | – | 1 |
| VMI | | – | | 5 | – | 1 | – | 0 |
| West Virginia | | – | | 5 | – | 1 | – | 0 |
| Centre | | – | | 4 | – | 1 | – | 1 |
| Virginia | | – | | 9 | – | 3 | – | 0 |
| Wofford | | – | | 3 | – | 1 | – | 0 |
| Navy | | – | | 5 | – | 2 | – | 0 |
| Ole Miss | | – | | 2 | – | 1 | – | 0 |
| South Carolina | | – | | 2 | – | 1 | – | 0 |
| VAMC | | – | | 4 | – | 2 | – | 0 |
| Tulane | | – | | 3 | – | 2 | – | 0 |
| Tennessee | | – | | 3 | – | 2 | – | 1 |
| Centenary | | – | | 1 | – | 1 | – | 0 |
| Guilford | | – | | 1 | – | 1 | – | 0 |
| Kentucky State College | | – | | 4 | – | 5 | – | 0 |
| North Carolina A&M | | – | | 1 | – | 2 | – | 1 |
| Central (KY) | | – | | 1 | – | 2 | – | 0 |
| Wake Forest | | – | | 0 | – | 0 | – | 1 |
| Marshall | | – | | 0 | – | 1 | – | 1 |
| Delaware | | – | | 1 | – | 3 | – | 0 |
| Columbian | | – | | 0 | – | 1 | – | 1 |
| Richmond | | – | | 0 | – | 5 | – | 1 |
| Catholic University | | – | | 0 | – | 1 | – | 0 |
| Oklahoma | | – | | 0 | – | 1 | – | 0 |
| Furman | | – | | 0 | – | 2 | – | 0 |
| Mississippi A&M | | – | | 0 | – | 2 | – | 0 |

The 1895 Furman Baptists football team represented Furman University as an independent during the 1895 college football season. Led by H. P. Young in his fourth and final season as head coach, Furman compiled a record of 0–2.

== Schedule ==
| Date | Opponent | Site | Result |
|---|---|---|---|
| November 8 | at South Carolina | Shandon Park; Columbia, SC | L 10–14 |
| November 23 | at Wofford | Spartanburg, SC (rivalry) | L 0–44 |
