= 1895 West Virginia Mountaineers football team =

American college football season

1895 West Virginia Mountaineers football
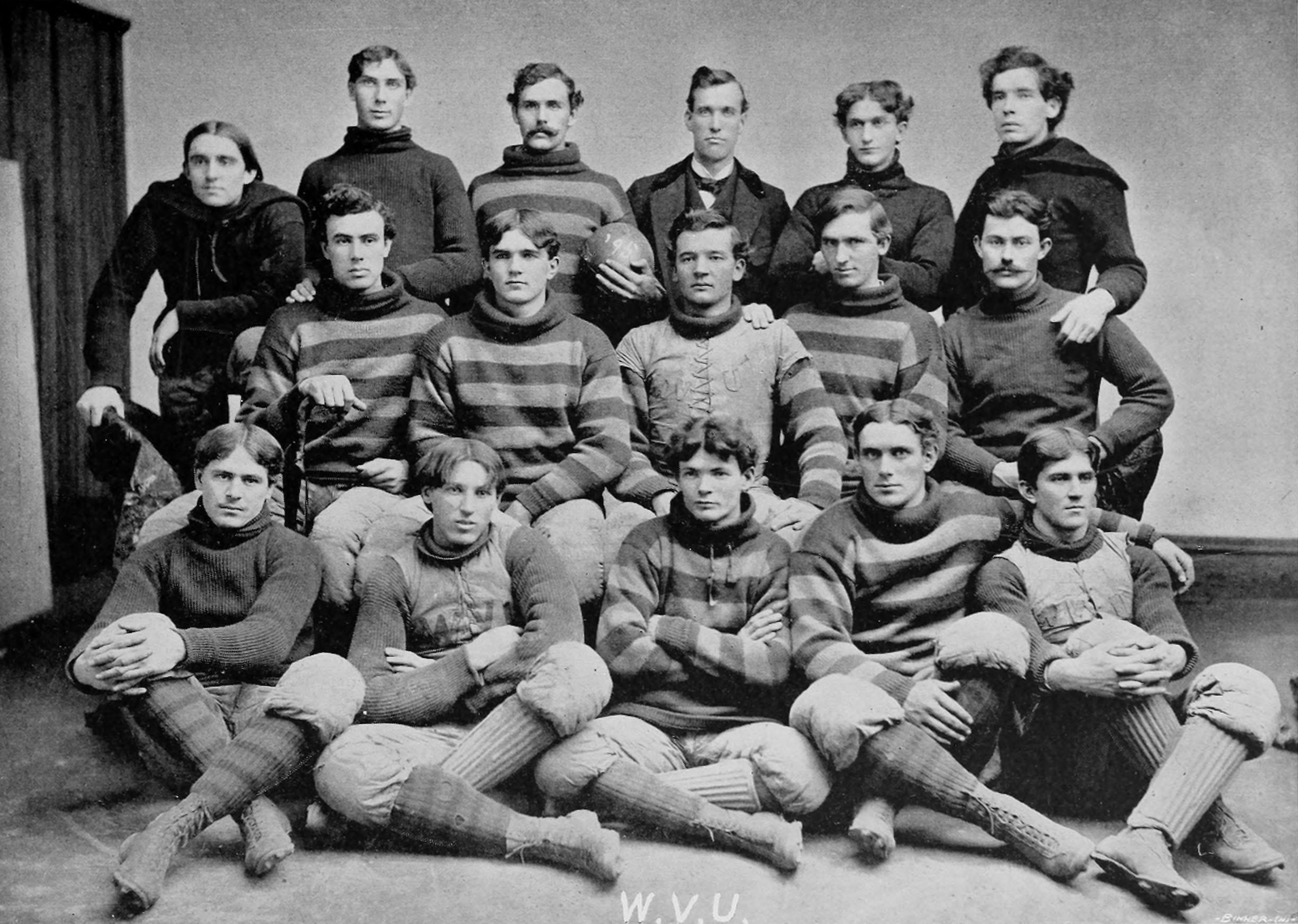
- group portrait of team
- Conference: Independent
- Record: 5–1
- Head coach: Harry McCrory (1st season)
- Captains: E. Bunker Reynolds; William J. Bruner

1895 Southern college football independents records
	Conf.			Overall
Team	W	L	T	W		L		T
Texas		–		5	–	0	–	0
LSU		–		3	–	0	–	0
Arkansas		–		1	–	0	–	0
Henry Kendall		–		1	–	0	–	0
North Carolina		–		7	–	1	–	1
VMI		–		5	–	1	–	0
West Virginia		–		5	–	1	–	0
Centre		–		4	–	1	–	1
Virginia		–		9	–	3	–	0
Wofford		–		3	–	1	–	0
Navy		–		5	–	2	–	0
Ole Miss		–		2	–	1	–	0
South Carolina		–		2	–	1	–	0
VAMC		–		4	–	2	–	0
Tulane		–		3	–	2	–	0
Tennessee		–		3	–	2	–	1
Centenary		–		1	–	1	–	0
Guilford		–		1	–	1	–	0
Kentucky State College		–		4	–	5	–	0
North Carolina A&M		–		1	–	2	–	1
Central (KY)		–		1	–	2	–	0
Wake Forest		–		0	–	0	–	1
Marshall		–		0	–	1	–	1
Delaware		–		1	–	3	–	0
Columbian		–		0	–	1	–	1
Richmond		–		0	–	5	–	1
Catholic University		–		0	–	1	–	0
Oklahoma		–		0	–	1	–	0
Furman		–		0	–	2	–	0
Mississippi A&M		–		0	–	2	–	0

The 1895 West Virginia Mountaineers football team was an American football team that represented West Virginia University as an independent during the 1895 college football season. In its first and only season under head coach Harry McCrory, the team compiled a 5–1 record and outscored opponents by a combined total of 58 to 10. The team's sole loss was to Washington & Jefferson by a 4–0 score.

E. Bunker "Bunk" Reynolds was elected captain at the beginning of the season and served in that role as late as the November 9 Marietta game; William J. Bruner was captain by the end of the season.

Among the players on the team 1895 was Fielding H. Yost, who would later earn greater college football renown as a coach.

== Roster ==
- Bruner (back)
- Harry Nelly (back substitute)
- Keely (back)
- George Krebs (left guard)
- Leps (fullback)
- Nethkins (right guard)
- Rane (left end)
- "Bunk" Reynolds (right end, captain)
- White (tackle)
- Fielding H. Yost (left tackle)

== Roster ==
1895 West Virginia Mountaineers football team roster
Players
Coaches
Offense

Pos.	#	Name	Class
End	11	John "Chip" Rane
End	13	Lewis Robb
End	17	Eddie Wood
Tackle	1	Jackson Arnold
Tackle	6	Josiah Keely
Tackle	16	Henry White
Tackle	18	Fielding H. Yost
Guard	7	George R. Krebs
Guard	10	C. Ervin Nethkin
Center	14	Walter South
Center	5	George M. Ford
Center	9	Henry Nelly
Center	15	William Standiford
QB	2	William J. Bruner
QB	3	Ralph Caldwell
HB	4	Harry O. Cole
HB	12	E. Bunker Reynolds
FB	8	Henry M. Leps

Defense

Pos.	#	Name	Class
DE	11	John "Chip" Rane
DE	13	Lewis Robb
DE	17	Eddie Wood
DT	1	Jackson Arnold
DT	6	Josiah Keely
DT	16	Henry White
DT	18	Fielding H. Yost
DG	7	George R. Krebs
DG	10	C. Ervin Nethkin
NG	14	Walter South
LB	8	Henry M. Leps
LB	5	George M. Ford
LB	9	Henry Nelly
LB	15	William Standiford
DB	4	Harry O. Cole
DB	12	E. Bunker Reynolds
S	2	William J. Bruner
S	3	Ralph Caldwell

Special teams

Pos.	#	Name	Class
P	8	Henry M. Leps
K	8	Henry M. Leps
KR	12	E. Bunker Reynolds
KR	4	Harry O. Cole
PR	4	Harry O. Cole
PR	12	E. Bunker Reynolds

Head coach

Harry McCrory

Coordinators/assistant coaches

- Andrew Howard

Legend

- (C) Team captain
- (S) Suspended
- (I) Ineligible
- Injured
- Redshirt

== Schedule ==
Date	Opponent	Site	Result	Attendance	Source
October 5	at Mount Pleasant	Mount Pleasant, PA	W 6–0		
October 19	vs. Latrobe Independents	Uniontown, PA	W 10–0		
October 26	Western University of Pennsylvania	Morgantown, WV (rivalry)	W 8–0		
November 9	vs. Marietta	Parkersburg, WV	W 6–0		
November 23	vs. Washington & Jefferson	Wheeling, WV	L 0–4		
November 27	vs. Washington and Lee	Charleston, WV	W 28–6	1,000	
