= 1895 Kentucky State College Blue and White football team =

American college football season

1895 Kentucky State College Blue and White football
- Conference: Independent
- Record: 4–5
- Head coach: Charles B. Mason (1st season)
- Captain: Smith Alford

1895 Southern college football independents records
| | Conf. | | | Overall |
| Team | W | L | T | W | | L | | T |
|---|---|---|---|---|---|---|---|---|
| Texas | | – | | 5 | – | 0 | – | 0 |
| LSU | | – | | 3 | – | 0 | – | 0 |
| Arkansas | | – | | 1 | – | 0 | – | 0 |
| Henry Kendall | | – | | 1 | – | 0 | – | 0 |
| North Carolina | | – | | 7 | – | 1 | – | 1 |
| VMI | | – | | 5 | – | 1 | – | 0 |
| West Virginia | | – | | 5 | – | 1 | – | 0 |
| Centre | | – | | 4 | – | 1 | – | 1 |
| Virginia | | – | | 9 | – | 3 | – | 0 |
| Wofford | | – | | 3 | – | 1 | – | 0 |
| Navy | | – | | 5 | – | 2 | – | 0 |
| Ole Miss | | – | | 2 | – | 1 | – | 0 |
| South Carolina | | – | | 2 | – | 1 | – | 0 |
| VAMC | | – | | 4 | – | 2 | – | 0 |
| Tulane | | – | | 3 | – | 2 | – | 0 |
| Tennessee | | – | | 3 | – | 2 | – | 1 |
| Centenary | | – | | 1 | – | 1 | – | 0 |
| Guilford | | – | | 1 | – | 1 | – | 0 |
| Kentucky State College | | – | | 4 | – | 5 | – | 0 |
| North Carolina A&M | | – | | 1 | – | 2 | – | 1 |
| Central (KY) | | – | | 1 | – | 2 | – | 0 |
| Wake Forest | | – | | 0 | – | 0 | – | 1 |
| Marshall | | – | | 0 | – | 1 | – | 1 |
| Delaware | | – | | 1 | – | 3 | – | 0 |
| Columbian | | – | | 0 | – | 1 | – | 1 |
| Richmond | | – | | 0 | – | 5 | – | 1 |
| Catholic University | | – | | 0 | – | 1 | – | 0 |
| Oklahoma | | – | | 0 | – | 1 | – | 0 |
| Furman | | – | | 0 | – | 2 | – | 0 |
| Mississippi A&M | | – | | 0 | – | 2 | – | 0 |

The 1895 Kentucky State College Blue and White football team represented Kentucky State College—now known as the University of Kentucky—during the 1895 college football season. Led by Charles B. Mason in his first and only season as head coach, the Blue and White compiled a record of 4–5.

== Schedule ==
| Date | Time | Opponent | Site | Result | Attendance | Source |
|---|---|---|---|---|---|---|
| October 5 | | at Frankfort Athletic Club | Frankfort, KY | W 10–0 | | |
| October 12 | | at Purdue | Stuart Field; West Lafayette, IN | L 0–32 | | |
| October 14 | | at DePauw | Greencastle, IN | L 0–18 | 500 | |
| October 19 | 3:00 p.m. | at Centre | Danville, KY (rivalry) | W 6–0 | 500 | |
| October 26 | | at Georgetown (KY) | Georgetown, KY | L 0–10 | | |
| November 2 | | Kentucky University | Lexington, KY | W 26–0 | 150 | |
| November 15 | 3:00 p.m. | Ohio State | Lexington, KY | L 6–8 | 300 | |
| November 23 | | Louisville Athletic Club | Lexington, KY | W 16–10 | | |
| November 28 | | Centre | Lexington, KY | L 0–16 | 3,000 | |
All times are in Eastern time
