= Saunders Taylor =

American football player, coach, & attorney (1875–1958)

Biographical details
- Born: February 23, 1875; Norfolk, Virginia
- Died: 1958
- Education: University of Virginia

Playing career
- 1891–1893: Johns Hopkins
- 1894: Virginia
- Position: Quarterback

Coaching career (HC unless noted)
- 1895–1896: Virginia Tech (assistant)
- 1898–1908: Virginia (assistant)

Accomplishments and honors

Championships
- Southern (1894)

Awards
- All-Southern (1895)

John Saunders Taylor (February 23, 1875 – 1958) was an American college football player and coach as well as an attorney.

== Early years ==
He was born on February 23, 1875, in Norfolk, Virginia, the son of Walter Herron Taylor.

=== Johns Hopkins ===
Taylor attended Johns Hopkins University and received a degree in electrical engineering. He played football and baseball.

=== University of Virginia ===
He then attended the University of Virginia, where he was one of the school's great quarterbacks.

==== 1894 ====
Taylor was selected All-Southern for his one season of work in 1894.

== Coaching career ==
He assisted his alma mater and Arlie C. Jones at V. P. I.
