= John A. Harts =

Biographical details
- Born: September 5, 1873; Hartsburg, Illinois, U.S.
- Died: August 31, 1947 (aged 73); Glendale, California, U.S.
- Education: Southwestern (KS)

Coaching career (HC unless noted)
- 1895: Oklahoma

Head coaching record
- Overall: 0–1

John Alexander Harts (September 5, 1873 – August 31, 1947) was an American football coach and elocution teacher. Harts was from Winfield, Kansas and served as the first coach of the Oklahoma Sooners football team at the University of Oklahoma in 1895.

Harts attended Southwestern College. He was the primary organizer of the first OU team, which was made up of students and Norman, Oklahoma residents. The team only played one game that year against a more experienced Oklahoma City team; the Sooners lost 34–0. Following that year, Harts left OU to prospect for gold in the Arctic. Harts is the only head football coach of record at Oklahoma to complete his tenure without a win. In the one game that he coached, the Sooners failed to score a point or to make a first down.

Harts was born in Hartsburg, Illinois. He died on August 31, 1947, at his home in Glendale, California. He had lived in Glendale for 15 years.

== Head coaching record ==
Year	Team	Overall	Bowl/playoffs
Oklahoma Sooners (Independent) (1895)
1895	Oklahoma	0–1	
Oklahoma:		0–1	
Total:		0–1	
