= Dan Wodicka =

American football coach (born c. 1991)

Current position
- Title: Head coach
- Team: Johns Hopkins
- Conference: Centennial
- Record: 25–4

Biographical details
- Born: c. 1991 (age 34–35); West Lafayette, Indiana, U.S.
- Education: Johns Hopkins University (2014)

Playing career
- 2010–2013: Johns Hopkins
- Position: Wide receiver

Coaching career (HC unless noted)
- 2014–2015: Johns Hopkins (WR)
- 2016: Northern Michigan (RB)
- 2017–2018: Williams (WR/TE)
- 2019–2021: Johns Hopkins (ST/DL)
- 2022–2023: Johns Hopkins (DC/LB)
- 2024–present: Johns Hopkins

Head coaching record
- Overall: 25–4
- Tournaments: 6–2 (NCAA D-III playoffs)

Accomplishments and honors

Championships
- 1 Centennial (2024)

Awards
- First-team All-Centennial (2011–2012); Second-team All-Centennial (2013); Mr. Football Award (Indiana) (2009)

Daniel Wodicka (born c. 1991) is an American college football coach. He is the head football coach for Johns Hopkins University, a position he has held since 2024. He also coached for Northern Michigan and Williams. He played college football for Johns Hopkins as a wide receiver.

== Head coaching record ==
Year	Team	Overall	Conference	Standing	Bowl/playoffs	D3^{#}	AFCA^{°}
Johns Hopkins Blue Jays (Centennial Conference) (2024–present)
2024	Johns Hopkins	12–2	6–0	1st	L NCAA Division III Semifinal	3	3
2025	Johns Hopkins	12–2	6–1	2nd	L NCAA Division III Semifinal	3	4
2026	Johns Hopkins	1–0	0–0				
Johns Hopkins:		25–4	12–1				
Total:		25–4					
National championship Conference title Conference division title or championship game berth
