= 1901 Colgate football team =

American college football season

1901 Colgate football
- Conference: Independent
- Record: 2–5
- Head coach: Charles B. Mason (3rd season)
- Captain: Arthur Griffen
- Home stadium: Whitnall Field

1901 Eastern college football independents records
	Conf.			Overall
Team	W	L	T	W		L		T
Harvard		–		12	–	0	–	0
Yale		–		11	–	1	–	1
Cornell		–		11	–	1	–	0
Dartmouth		–		10	–	1	–	0
Massachusetts		–		9	–	1	–	0
Princeton		–		9	–	1	–	1
Syracuse		–		7	–	1	–	0
Geneva		–		7	–	1	–	1
Holy Cross		–		7	–	1	–	1
Army		–		5	–	1	–	2
Western U. of Penn		–		7	–	2	–	1
Lafayette		–		9	–	3	–	0
Swarthmore		–		8	–	2	–	2
Washington & Jefferson		–		6	–	2	–	2
Franklin & Marshall		–		7	–	3	–	1
Penn		–		10	–	5	–	0
Buffalo		–		4	–	2	–	0
Columbia		–		8	–	5	–	0
Fordham		–		2	–	1	–	1
Penn State		–		5	–	3	–	0
Bucknell		–		6	–	4	–	0
Temple		–		3	–	2	–	0
NYU		–		4	–	3	–	1
Pittsburgh College		–		3	–	3	–	0
Tufts		–		6	–	6	–	1
Vermont		–		5	–	5	–	1
Carlisle		–		5	–	7	–	1
Dickinson		–		4	–	6	–	0
Brown		–		4	–	7	–	1
Villanova		–		2	–	3	–	0
Drexel		–		2	–	5	–	1
Colgate		–		2	–	5	–	0
Boston College		–		1	–	8	–	0
Lehigh		–		1	–	11	–	0
New Hampshire		–		0	–	6	–	0
Rutgers		–		0	–	7	–	0

The 1901 Colgate football team was an American football team that represented Colgate University as an independent during the 1901 college football season. In its third and final season under head coach Charles B. Mason, the team compiled a 2–5 record. Arthur Griffen was the team captain. The team played its home games on Whitnall Field in Hamilton, New York.

== Schedule ==
Date	Opponent	Site	Result	Attendance	Source
September 21	Colgate Academy	Whitnall Field; Hamilton, NY	W 12–6		
September 28	at Cornell	Percy Field; Ithaca, NY (rivalry)	L 0–17	1,000	
October 9	at Williams	Weston Field; Williamstown, MA	L 0–29		
October 19	at Union (NY)	Schenectady, NY	L 0–21		
October 26	Rochester	Whitnall Field; Hamilton, NY	L 6–11		
November 1	at Hobart	Geneva, NY	W 11–10		
November 9	Hamilton	Whitnall Field; Hamilton, NY	L 0–12		
