= Oscar Lang =

American football player and coach (1877–1928)

Biographical details
- Born: June 16, 1877; Philadelphia, Pennsylvania, U.S.
- Died: July 16, 1928 (aged 51); Camden, New Jersey, U.S.

Playing career
- 1895: Virginia
- 1897: Bucknell
- 1898: Latrobe Athletic Association
- 1899: Conshohocken Athletic Club
- 1901: Philadelphia Pros
- 1902: Philadelphia Phillies
- Positions: Fullback, halfback

Coaching career (HC unless noted)
- 1899: Franklin & Marshall (assistant)
- 1900–1901: Susquehanna

Head coaching record
- Overall: 5–10–2

Accomplishments and honors

Awards
- All-Southern (1895)

Oscar Lang Jr. (June 16, 1877 – July 16, 1928) was an American football, basketball, and baseball player as well as a coach.

== Playing career ==
Lang was a prominent fullback for the Virginia Cavaliers football team of the University of Virginia. He was selected All-Southern in 1895. In 1897, he played as a halfback for the football team at Bucknell University.

Lang played professionally with the independent Philadelphia Pros in 1901, and in the following season, he and several others from that club signed with the Philadelphia Phillies of the first National Football League.

== Coaching career ==
In 1899, Lang was an assistant football coach at Franklin & Marshall College in Lancaster, Pennsylvania. He coached the football team at Susquehanna University in Selinsgrove, Pennsylvania from 1900 to 1901, compiling a record of 5–10–2.

== Later life and death ==
In the 1920s, Lang worked as an agent for the Bureau of Prohibition in South Jersey. He then ran a bakery with his sister, Elizabeth Lang, in Haddon Township, New Jersey. Lang died on July 16, 1928, after suffering a heart attack while playing tennis at Farnham Park in Camden, New Jersey.

== Head coaching record ==
Year	Team	Overall	Conference	Standing	Bowl/playoffs
Susquehanna (Independent) (1900–1901)
1900	Susquehanna	3–4–2			
1901	Susquehanna	2–6			
Susquehanna:		5–10–2			
Total:		5–10–2			
