= Wilson L. Fewster =

American sports coach (1926–2014)

Biographical details
- Born: November 10, 1926; Baltimore County, Maryland, U.S.
- Died: June 11, 2014 (aged 87); Towson, Maryland, U.S.
- Education: Johns Hopkins (1950)

Playing career

Lacrosse
- 1947–1950: Johns Hopkins

Coaching career (HC unless noted)

Football
- 1957–1965: Johns Hopkins

Lacrosse
- 1951: Washington and Lee
- 1952–1953: Johns Hopkins
- 1954: Virginia
- 1957–1966: Johns Hopkins (assistant)

Soccer
- 1954: Virginia

Head coaching record
- Overall: 28–36–6 (football)

Accomplishments and honors

Championships
- Football; 1 Mason–Dixon (1959); 2 MAC Southern College Division (1959–1960)

Wilson Lloyd Fewster Jr. (November 10, 1926 – June 11, 2014) was an American college lacrosse player and college football, college lacrosse, college soccer, and wrestling coach. He coached all four of those sports at various times between 1951 and 1966 at his alma mater, Johns Hopkins University in Baltimore, Maryland. Fewster also served as the head lacrosse coach at Washington & Lee University in 1951 and the University of Virginia in 1954.

Fewster was the son of former Major League Baseball player, Chick Fewster.

== Head coaching record ==
=== Football ===
Year	Team	Overall	Conference	Standing	Bowl/playoffs
Johns Hopkins Blue Jays (Mason–Dixon Conference) (1957)
1957	Johns Hopkins	3–2–2	1–1–1	T–2nd	
Johns Hopkins Blue Jays (Middle Atlantic Conference / Mason–Dixon Conference) (1958–1965)
1958	Johns Hopkins	5–3	5–1 / 0–3	2nd (Southern College) / T–5th	
1959	Johns Hopkins	7–1	6–0 / 2–1	1st (Southern College) / 1st	
1960	Johns Hopkins	5–2–1	5–1 / 0–2	1st (Southern College) / T–5th	
1961	Johns Hopkins	3–4–1	2–3–1 / 1–1	6th (Southern College) / T–3rd	
1962	Johns Hopkins	2–6	2–4 / 0–2	7th (Southern College) / T–4th	
1963	Johns Hopkins	0–6–1	0–4–1 / 0–1	11th (Southern College) / T–5th	
1964	Johns Hopkins	2–6	2–4 / 0–2	T–8th (Southern College) / 6th	
1965	Johns Hopkins	1–6–1	1–4–1 / 1–1	T–10th (Southern College) / 4th	
Johns Hopkins:		28–36–6			
Total:		28–36–6			
National championship Conference title Conference division title or championship game berth
