= T. L. Bayne =

American football player, sports coach, and attorney (1865–1934)

Biographical details
- Born: July 25, 1865; Cambridge, Maryland, U.S.
- Died: August 21, 1934 (aged 69); New Orleans, Louisiana, U.S.

Playing career
- 1884: Yale
- Position: Quarterback

Coaching career (HC unless noted)

Football
- 1893: Tulane
- 1893: LSU (assistant)
- 1895: Tulane

Baseball
- 1894–1895: Tulane

Head coaching record
- Overall: 4–4 (football)

Thomas Levingston Bayne Jr. (July 25, 1865 – August 21, 1934) was an American football player, coach of football and baseball, and attorney. He served as the first head football coach at Tulane University in 1893 and returned for a second season in 1895. Bayne was responsible for helping to introduce the sport of football to the city of New Orleans with an inter-club game in 1892. In 1893, he helped establish the intercollegiate program at Louisiana State University. He also coached the baseball team at Tulane for two seasons.

== Early life ==
A native of New Orleans, Bayne was born the son of Thomas Levingston Bayne, a reputable lawyer of the city, former Confederate Army lieutenant colonel, and son-in-law of Alabama governor John Gayle. The younger Bayne attended Yale University and graduated as a member of the Class of 1887. In 1884, he played on the Yale football team as a quarterback. In 1888, Bayne joined his father's law firm, Denègre & Bayne.

On December 31, 1892, Bayne and his brother, Hugh Aiken Bayne, organized the Southern Club to play a football game against a club from Birmingham, Alabama, at Audubon Park in New Orleans. The Southern Club won, 6–0, before a crowd of 2,000 spectators in cold and rainy conditions.

== Tulane ==
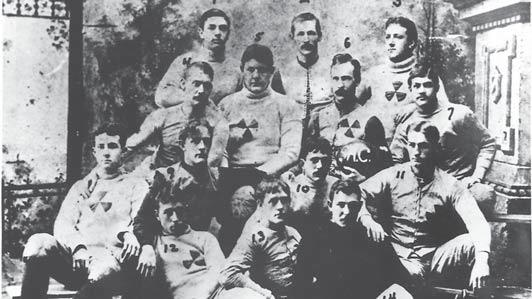
Tulane's first football team was coached by Bayne in 1893. This is the Southern Athletic Club, on which Bayne (upper row, middle, marked as 2 in photo) played.

In 1893, he coached Tulane's first intercollegiate football team to a 1–2 record. That season, he arranged for his team to play Louisiana State on November 25 at Sportsman's Park in New Orleans. It was the initial season of football for LSU, and he made several trips to Baton Rouge to assist chemistry professor Charles E. Coates coach a team of cadets. Before the game, Bayne discovered that Coates was not available for the contest. Bayne agreed to coach both teams, and also handled ticket sales, construction of the goal posts, and officiating duties. He was compensated with a green umbrella. Tulane won, 34–0, which prompted the Chicago Daily Tribune to remark in 1955 that "Bayne's Tulane team whipped Bayne's L. S. U. team."

From 1894 to 1895, Bayne coached the Tulane baseball team alongside Jack Dowling. After a one-year hiatus in which Fred Sweet coached the football team, Bayne returned to take the helm for the 1895 season. He coached Tulane to a 3–2 record, and finished his tenure with a final record of 4–4. That year, he also served as the team captain of the Southern Club.

== Death ==
Bayne died on August 21, 1934.

== Head coaching record ==
=== Football ===
Year	Team	Overall	Conference	Standing	Bowl/playoffs
Tulane Olive and Blue (Independent) (1893)
1893	Tulane	1–2			
Tulane Olive and Blue (Independent) (1895)
1895	Tulane	3–2			
Tulane:		4–4			
Total:		4–4			
