= W. M. Matthews =

American football coach

Biographical details
- Born: Harrisburg, Texas, U.S.
- Education: Mississippi A&M

Coaching career (HC unless noted)
- 1895: Mississippi A&M

Head coaching record
- Overall: 0–2

W. M. Matthews was an American college football coach. He served as the head football coach at Mississippi Agricultural & Mechanical College—now known as Mississippi State University—for the school's inaugural football season in 1895. During his one-season tenure, Matthews compiled a record of 0–2. He is also credited with the selection of what became the official school colors, maroon and white, prior to the Aggies first game, played at Union University in Jackson, Tennessee.

== Head coaching record ==
Year	Team	Overall	Conference	Standing	Bowl/playoffs
Mississippi A&M Aggies (Southern Intercollegiate Athletic Association) (1895)
1895	Mississippi A&M	0–2			
Mississippi A&M:		0–2			
Total:		0–2			
