= Charles B. Mason =

American football player, coach, and lawyer (1873–1935)

Biographical details
- Born: August 23, 1873; Norwich, New York, U.S.
- Died: January 10, 1935 (aged 61); Utica, New York, U.S.
- Education: Cornell University (1895)

Playing career
- 1894: Cornell

Coaching career (HC unless noted)
- 1895: Kentucky State College
- 1897–1898: Colgate
- 1901: Colgate

Head coaching record
- Overall: 13–17–1

Charles Bliven "Chick" Mason (August 23, 1873 – January 10, 1935) was an American college football player and coach and lawyer. Mason's first coaching job was for Kentucky State College—now known as the University of Kentucky—in 1895, where he posted a record of 4–5. His next job was as the sixth head football coach at Colgate University in Hamilton, New York; he held that position for three seasons, from 1897 until 1898 and again in 1901. His record at Colgate was 9–12–1. He was a member of the Cornell University class of 1895.

Mason played football at Cornell, where he was a teammate of Clint Wyckoff and George P. Dyer. He later practiced law in Utica, New York. Mason died at his home, in Utica, on January 10, 1935.

== Head coaching record ==
Year	Team	Overall	Conference	Standing	Bowl/playoffs
Kentucky State College Blue and White (Independent) (1895)
1895	Kentucky State College	4–5			
Kentucky State College:		4–5			
Colgate (Independent) (1897–1898)
1897	Colgate	5–2–1			
1898	Colgate	2–5			
Colgate (Independent) (1901–present)
1901	Colgate	2–5			
Colgate:		9–12–1			
Total:		13–17–1			
