= Robert H. Mudd =

American football player and coach (1875–1904)

Profile
- Position: End

Personal information
- Born: February 23, 1875; St. Louis, Missouri
- Died: January 30, 1904 (aged 28)

Career information
- College: Virginia (1894)

Awards and highlights
- All-Southern (1895)

Robert Henry Mudd (February 23, 1875 – January 30, 1904) was a college football player and coach. He was a relative of Harvey Seeley Mudd.

== Early life ==
Mudd was born on February 23, 1875, in St. Louis, Missouri, to Dr. Henry Hodgen Mudd.

== University of Virginia ==
=== Playing ===
Mudd was a prominent end for the Virginia Cavaliers football team of the University of Virginia. He was selected All-Southern in 1895.

=== Coaching ===
He was an assistant at his alma mater in 1898.
