= H. L. Fairbanks =

American baseball player, football player/coach, and lawyer

Biographical details
- Born: September 21, 1871; Farmington, Maine, U.S.
- Died: February 15, 1909 (aged 37); Bangor, Maine, U.S.
- Education: Harvard Law (1900)

Playing career

Football
- 1893–1894: Bowdoin

Baseball
- 1892–1895: Bowdoin
- 1894–1895: Bangor Millionaires
- Positions: Quarterback (football), third baseman (baseball)

Coaching career (HC unless noted)

Football
- 1895: Ole Miss

Head coaching record
- Overall: 2–1

Hiland Lockwood Fairbanks (September 21, 1871 – February 15, 1909) was an American minor league baseball player, lawyer and college football player and coach. He was a two-sport athlete at Bowdoin College in Brunswick, Maine, playing quarterback on the school's football team and serving as a team captain in 1893. During his collegiate days, he also played baseball for the Bangor Millionaires. After graduating, he served as the head football coach at the University of Mississippi in Oxford, Mississippi for one season, in 1895, compiling a record of 2–1.

Fairbanks died after suffering from tuberculosis in 1909. The Hiland Lockwood Fairbanks award at Bowdoin is named in his honor.

== Head coaching record ==
Year	Team	Overall	Conference	Standing	Bowl/playoffs
Ole Miss Rebels (Independent) (1895)
1895	Ole Miss	2–1			
Ole Miss:		2–1			
Total:		2–1			
