= 1895 Tennessee Docs football team =

American college football season

1895 Tennessee Docs football
- Conference: Independent
- Record: 0–3–1
- Home stadium: Baldwin Park

The 1895 Tennessee Docs football team represented the Tennessee Medical Unit at Knoxville (now known as the University of Tennessee College of Medicine in Memphis, Tennessee) in college football during the 1895 college football season. The Docs finished the season with a winless record of 0–3–1.

== Schedule ==
Date	Opponent	Site	Result	Source
November 16	at Maryville	Maryville, TN	L 0–16	
November 23	Maryville	Baldwin Park; Knoxville, TN	T 0–0	
November 28	at Bingham School	Allandale Field; Asheville, NC	L 0–18	
November 30	Tennessee	Baldwin Park; Knoxville, TN	L 0–40	
