= Harry McCrory =

American football coach

Biographical details
- Born: August 1, 1871; Pennsylvania, U.S.
- Died: May 9, 1907 (aged 35); Fairmont, West Virginia, U.S.
- Education: University of Pennsylvania

Coaching career (HC unless noted)
- 1894: Ohio Normal
- 1895: West Virginia

Head coaching record
- Overall: 7–1

Harry Nickel McCrory (August 1, 1871 – May 9, 1907) was an American college football coach. He served as the third head football coach at West Virginia University in Morgantown, West Virginia and he held that position for the 1895 season. His coaching record at West Virginia was 5–1.

McCrory also served as the head football coach at Ohio Northern University in 1894 while he was attending pharmacy school.

McCrory later worked as a druggist in West Virginia. He married Bessie Lee Nuzum in 1897. He died of bright's disease in 1907. He was buried in Woodlawn Cemetery in Fairmont.

Harry McCrory's grandson, Lee Harland McCrory (son of George Harland McCrory; 1898–1977) was presented with an alumni award from West Virginia University.

== Head coaching record ==
Year	Team	Overall	Conference	Standing	Bowl/playoffs
Ohio Normal (Independent) (1894)
1894	Ohio Normal	2–0			
Ohio Normal:		2–0			
West Virginia Mountaineers (Independent) (1895)
1895	West Virginia	5–1			
West Virginia:		5–1			
Total:		7–1			
