= George L. Hicks =

American football player and colonel (1871–1956)

Profile
- Position: Tackle

Personal information
- Born: April 4, 1871
- Died: September 3, 1956 (aged 85); Cambridge, Maryland, U.S.
- Listed weight: 173 lb (78 kg)

Career information
- College: Virginia (1892–1894)

Awards and highlights
- Southern championship (1892, 1893, 1894); All-Southern (1895)

George Luther Hicks (April 4, 1871 – September 3, 1956) was an American college football player and colonel in the U. S. Army. He served in the Spanish American War and World War I.

== Biography ==
George Luther Hicks was a son of former Confederate field surgeon George L. Hicks, Sr. and Nancy Hicks, the daughter of Governor Thomas Holliday Hicks. He married Mabel Mullen.

=== University of Virginia ===
Hicks was a prominent tackle for the Virginia Cavaliers football team of the University of Virginia. The school claims a Southern championship every year he played. He was selected for an All-Southern team in 1895.
