= Jim Baird (American football) =

American college football player (1874–1938)

Profile
- Position: Tackle

Personal information
- Born: October 4, 1874; Mason, Texas, U.S.
- Died: March 2, 1938; Petersburg, Virginia, U.S.

Career information
- College: North Carolina (1894–1895)

Awards and highlights
- All-Southern (1895)

James Andrew Baird (October 4, 1874 – March 2, 1938) was an American college football player.

== University of North Carolina ==
Baird was a prominent tackle for the North Carolina Tar Heels football team of the University of North Carolina. He was from Asheville, North Carolina. He was considered a great tackler. In 1895, Baird was selected All-Southern. The team's quarterback was Joel Whitaker.

== Petersburg ==
Baird died in Petersburg, Virginia. He was connected with the Richmond to Petersburg street car system, president of the Petersburg to Hopewell and City Point railway.
