= David Kirkpatrick (American football) =

American football player and brick manufacturer (1870–1939)

- Born: August 16, 1870; Guilford County, North Carolina
- Died: July 12, 1939 (aged 68); Greensboro, North Carolina
- Occupation: Brick manufacturer
- Football career

Profile
- Position: Guard

Personal information
- Listed height: 6 ft 2 in (1.88 m)
- Listed weight: 230 lb (104 kg)

Career information
- College: North Carolina (1892–1893)

Awards and highlights
- Southern championship (1892); All-Southern (1895)

David Alexander Kirkpatrick (August 16, 1870 – July 12, 1939) was a college football player and pioneer brick manufacturer of Greensboro and Reidsville.

== University of North Carolina ==
Kirkpatrick was a prominent guard for the North Carolina Tar Heels football team of the University of North Carolina; known for his size. He was selected for an All-Southern team in 1895.

=== 1892 ===
He was a member of the 1892 team which claims a Southern championship and won three games in four days.
