= George Burlingame =

American football player and coach

Playing career
- 1894: Virginia
- Positions: Guard, center

Coaching career (HC unless noted)
- 1895–1898: Johns Hopkins
- 1899: Western Maryland

Accomplishments and honors

Awards
- All-Southern (1895)

George Burlingame was an American college football player and coach.

== University of Virginia ==
Burlingame was a prominent guard and center for the Virginia Cavaliers football team of the University of Virginia. Burlingame was selected All-Southern in 1895.

== Coaching career ==
=== Johns Hopkins ===
Burlingame was the first coach in the history of Johns Hopkins University.
