= Willie Merritt =

American football player and attorney (1872–1961)

Profile
- Position: End

Personal information
- Born: January 31, 1872; Person County, North Carolina, U.S.
- Died: March 25, 1961 (aged 89); Roxboro, North Carolina, U.S.
- Listed height: 5 ft 11 in (1.80 m)
- Listed weight: 160 lb (73 kg)

Career information
- College: North Carolina (1892–1895)

Awards and highlights
- Southern championship (1892); All-Southern (1895)

William Daniel Merritt (January 31, 1872 – March 25, 1961) was an American college football player and attorney.

== University of North Carolina ==
Merritt was a prominent end for the North Carolina Tar Heels football team of the University of North Carolina.

=== 1892 ===
Merritt was a substitute on the 1892 team which claims a Southern championship.

=== 1895 ===
He was selected All-Southern in 1895.
