= Johns Hopkins Blue Jays football =

Football team representing Johns Hopkins University

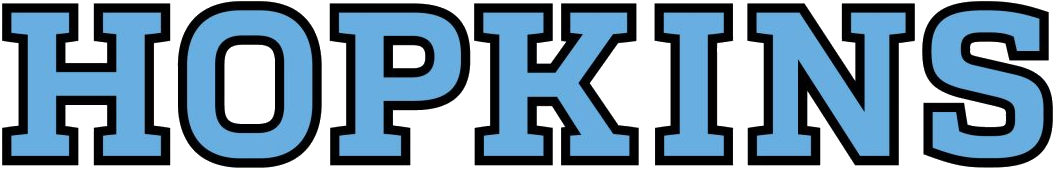
- First season: 1882; 144 years ago
- Athletic director: Jennifer S. Baker
- Head coach: Dan Wodicka; 2nd season, 24–4 (.857)
- Location: Baltimore, Maryland
- Stadium: Homewood Field (capacity: 8,500)
- Conference: Centennial
- Colors: Hopkins blue and black
- All-time record: 616–492–57 (.553)

Conference championships
- 23
- Consensus All-Americans: 28 Individuals (Since 1980 to 2021)
- Rivalries: McDaniel
- Fight song: To Win; Johnny Hopkins, On to Victory
- Website: hopkinssports.com

The Johns Hopkins Blue Jays football team represents Johns Hopkins University in the sport of American football. The Blue Jays compete in Division III of the National Collegiate Athletic Association (NCAA) as members of the Centennial Conference. Johns Hopkins has fielded a team since 1882. Johns Hopkins has won or shared 13 Centennial Conference titles since the 2002 season, including 10 straight titles through the 2018 season.

== History ==
Hopkins' first team was assembled in 1881, and spent an entire year training and learning a version of the game. Their sport, which was closer to rugby, was played in Druid Hill Park. After the training, the team planned a two-game 1882 season. The squad had to play the season under the title of the Clifton Athletic Club, due to the school's policy on the sport of football. The first was a practice game with the Baltimore Athletic Club, played on October 7. The Hopkins team lost the contest 4–0. The following game was their first true game, to be played against the Naval Academy.

== Seasons ==
Year	Coach	Overall	Conference	Standing	Bowl/playoffs	Coaches^{#}	D3^{°}
No coach (Independent) (1882–1894)
No coach:		24–33–5 (.427)					
George Burlingame (Independent) (1895, 1897–1898)
Burlingame:		7–10–1 (.417)					
Ivan Thorson & Bond (Independent) (1899–1900)
Thorson & Bond:		9–3–2 (.714)					
Byron W. Dickinson (Independent) (1901–1902)
Dickinson:		6–3–2 (.636)					
Lawrence Lee Iseman (Independent) (1904–1905)
Iseman:		8–2–4 (.714)					
Patrick McDonnell & Alexander Randall (Independent) (1906)
McDonell & Randall:		2–5–1 (.313)					
J. Abner Saylor (Independent) (1907–1908)
Saylor:		7–5–3 (.567)					
Thomas Lynn (Independent) (1909–1910)
Lynn:		11–3–1 (.767)					
Edwin Harlan (Independent) (1911)
Harland:		4–5 (.444)					
Max Rohde (Independent) (1912)
Rohde:		0–9 (.000)					
John H. Gates (Independent) (1913–1914)
Gates:		3–11–1 (.233)					
Charles Brickley (Independent) (1915)
Brickey:		6–2 (.750)					
Harry E. Brennick (Independent) (1916)
Brennick:		2–7 (.222)					
B. Russell Murphy (Independent) (1917–1919)
Murphy:		6–11–4 (.381)					
Ray Van Orman (Independent) (1920–1935)
Van Orman:		60–64–7 (.485)					
C. Gardner Mallonee (Independent) (1936–1942, 1943–1945)
Mallonee:		17–26–6 (.408)					
Howdy Myers (Mason–Dixon Conference) (1946–1949)
1946	Myers	5–3	2–0	2nd			
1947	Myers	5–2–1					
1948	Myers	7–1	3–0	1st			
1949	Myers	4–4	2–1	T–2nd			
Myers:		21–10–1 (.691)					
Myers:		26–14–1 (.646) (including 1979)					
Charles H. Guy (Mason–Dixon Conference) (1950)
1950	Guy	3–4–1	0–2–1	8th			
Guy:		3–4–1 (.438)					
Frank R. Burns (Mason–Dixon Conference) (1951–1952)
1951	Burns	2–5–1	0–2–1	5th			
1952	Burns	4–4	1–2	T–3rd			
Burns:		6–9–1 (.406) (.406)					
John Bridgers (Mason–Dixon Conference) (1953–1956)
1953	Bridgers	2–6	0–3	6th			
1954	Bridgers	2–6	1–2	5th			
1955	Bridgers	2–6	0–2	5th			
1956	Bridgers	4–3–1	3–0	1st			
Bridgers:		10–21–1 (.359) (.328)					
Wilson L. Fewster (Mason–Dixon Conference, Middle Atlantic Conference South (1958~) (Note: From 1958 to 1974 the Blue Jays football team played in both the Mason–Dixon Conference and the Middle Atlantic Conference (MAC) South. During that period, conference records and standings reflect those of the MAC South.)) (1957–1965)
1957	Fewster	3–2–2	1–1–1	3rd			
1958	Fewster	5–3	5–1	2nd			
1959	Fewster	7–1	6–0	1st (Note: Johns Hopkins was the champion of both the Mason–Dixon Conference and the MAC South in 1959.)			
1960	Fewster	5–2–1	5–1	1st			
1961	Fewster	3–4–1	2–3–1	6th			
1962	Fewster	2–6	2–4	7th			
1963	Fewster	0–6–1	0–4–1	11th			
1964	Fewster	2–6	2–4	9th			
1965	Fewster	1–6–1	1–4–1	10th			
Fewster:		28–36–6 (.443)					
Alex Sotir (Middle Atlantic Conference South & Mason–Dixon Conference) (1966–1970)
1966	Sotir	0–6–2	0–4–2	11th			
1967	Sotir	6–1	6–0	1st			
1968	Sotir	7–2	6–1	1st			
1969	Sotir	5–4	5–2	1st			
1970	Sotir	5–4	5–2	3rd			
Sotir:		23–17–2 (.571)					
Dennis Cox (Middle Atlantic Conference South & Mason–Dixon Conference (~1974)) (1971–1978)
1971	Cox	6–3	5–2	3rd			
1972	Cox	6–3	5–2	3rd			
1973	Cox	6–3	4–2	4th			
1974	Cox	3–5–1	3–2–1	5th			
1975	Cox	3–5–1	3–3–1 (3–2–1)	5th			
1976	Cox	3–5–1	2–4–1 (2–3–1)	8th			
1977	Cox	1–8–1	0–8–1 (0–6–1)	10th			
1978	Cox	3–6	2–5	10th			
Cox:		31–38–4 (.452)					
Howdy Myers (Middle Atlantic Conference South) (1979)
1979	Myers	5–4	4–4	6th			
Myers:		5–4 (.556)					
Myers:		26–14–1 (.646) (incl. 1946–49)					
Jerry Pfeifer (Middle Atlantic Conference South (~1982), Centennial Conference (1983~)) (1980–1989)
1980	Pfeifer	1–8	0–8	11th			
1981	Pfeifer	7–2	6–2	2nd			
1982	Pfeifer	3–6	2–6	9th			
1983	Pfeifer	5–4	3–4	5th			
1984	Pfeifer	5–4	3–4	5th			
1985	Pfeifer	6–3	4–3	4th			
1986	Pfeifer	3–5–1	2–4–1	5th			
1987	Pfeifer	4–6	3–4	5th			
1988	Pfeifer	1–9	1–6	7th			
1989	Pfeifer	1–9	1–6	8th			
Pfeifer:		36–56–1 (.392)	25–47–1 (.349)				
Jim Margraff (Centennial Conference) (1990–2018)
1990	Margraff	5–4–1	4–2–1	3rd			
1991	Margraff	5–4–1	3–4	4th			
1992	Margraff	6–4	4–3	T–3rd			
1993	Margraff	4–6	2–5	6th			
1994	Margraff	4–6	4–3	4th			
1995	Margraff	6–3–1	4–2–1	3rd			
1996	Margraff	7–3	5–2	3rd			
1997	Margraff	7–3	5–2	3rd			
1998	Margraff	7–3	5–2	T–2nd			
1999	Margraff	4–6	3–4	5th			
2000	Margraff	5–5	4–3	T–4th			
2001	Margraff	6–3	4–2	3rd			
2002	Margraff	9–2	5–1	T–1st			
2003	Margraff	10–1	5–1	T–1st		24	25
2004	Margraff	9–2	4–2	T–1st			
2005	Margraff	8–3	5–1	1st			
2006	Margraff	5–5	3–3	T–3rd			
2007	Margraff	4–6	3–5	7th			
2008	Margraff	8–3	6–2	T–2nd			
2009	Margraff	10–3	7–1	1st		8	11
2010	Margraff	8–3	7–2	T–1st			
2011	Margraff	10–1	9–0	1st		19	18
2012	Margraff	10–2	8–1	1st		12	22
2013	Margraff	10–1	9–0	1st		12	12
2014	Margraff	11–1	9–0	1st		10	10
2015	Margraff	11–1	9–0	1st		10	13
2016	Margraff	11–1	9–0	1st		9	11
2017	Margraff	9–2	8–1	T–1st		20	20
2018	Margraff	12–2	8–1	T–1st		5	5
Margraff:		221–89–3 (.711)					
Greg Chimera (Centennial Conference) (2019–2023)
2019	Chimera	8–3	6–3	3rd			
2020	Chimera	Season cancelled					
2021	Chimera	10–2	8–1	T–1st		13	14
2022	Chimera	10–1	8–1	2nd		21	21
2023	Chimera	12–1	6–0	1st		7	8
Chimera:		40–7 (.851)	28–5 (.848)				
Dan Wodicka (Centennial Conference) (2024–present)
2024	Wodicka	12–2	6–0	1st		3	3
2025	Wodicka	12–2	6–1	2nd		4	3
Wodicka:		24–4 (.857)	12–1 (.923)				
Total:		619–493–57 (.554)					
National championship Conference title Conference division title or championship game berth
^{†}Indicates Bowl Coalition, Bowl Alliance, BCS, or CFP / New Years' Six bowl.; ^{#}Rankings from final Coaches Poll.

== Postseason appearances ==
=== NCAA Division III ===
The Blue Jays have made fourteen appearances in the NCAA Division III playoffs, with a combined record of 18–14.

Year	Round	Opponent	Result
2005	First Round	Thiel	L, 3–28
2009	First Round; Second Round; Quarterfinals	Hampden–Sydney; Thomas More; Wesley (DE)	W, 23–7; W, 31–29; L, 0–12
2011	First Round	St. John Fisher	L, 12–23
2012	First Round; Second Round	Washington & Jefferson; Mount Union	W, 42–10; L, 13–55
2013	First Round	Wesley (DE)	L, 24–29
2014	First Round; Second Round	Rowan; Hobart	W, 24–16; L, 21–24
2015	First Round; Second Round	Western New England; Wesley (DE)	W, 52–20; L, 37–42
2016	First Round; Second Round	Randolph–Macon; Mount Union	W, 42–21; L, 21–28
2017	First Round	Washington & Jefferson	L, 28–31
2018	First Round; Second Round; Quarterfinals; Semifinals	MIT; Frostburg State; RPI; Mount Union	W, 49–0; W, 58–27; W, 37–14; L, 20–28
2021	First Round; Second Round	Salisbury; Mount Union	W, 45–20; L, 35–45
2023	First Round; Second Round; Quarterfinals	Western Connecticut; Union (NY); Randolph–Macon	W, 62–20; W, 39–17; L, 36–39
2024	Second Round; Third Round; Quarterfinals; Semifinals	Grove City; DePauw; Mary Hardin–Baylor; Mount Union	W, 17–14; W, 14–9; W, 17–10; L, 37–45
2025	Second Round; Third Round; Quarterfinals; Semifinals	Springfield; Salisbury; Susquehanna; Wisconsin–River Falls	W, 34–14; W, 45–13; W, 40–10; L, 41–48

== Notable players ==
Bill Stromberg earned a B.A. from Hopkins in 1982 and became one of the most decorated athletes in the history of Johns Hopkins, making him "arguably the best football player in Johns Hopkins history." He is considered one of the best wide receivers in NCAA Division III history as the holder of six national and 13 school records. Stromberg was inducted into the Johns Hopkins Hall of Fame and then elected to the College Football Hall of Fame in 2004, and was, as of 2017, the only Hopkins football player to be inducted there. Hopkins constructed a new baseball field and athletic facilities which was named Stromberg Stadium in 2014 in his honor.

After graduation, Stromberg signed as a free agent with the Philadelphia Eagles, played a few preseason games before pulling a hamstring, and was ultimately cut before the 1982 season began. He became the CEO of Baltimore-based asset management firm T. Rowe Price in 2016.

Wide Receiver and National Lacrosse Hall of Famer Joe Cowan was drafted by the Baltimore Colts in 1969.

Maryland Governor Wes Moore was a wide receiver for the Blue Jays while in college.

== Notes ==
1. D3Football.com rankings are available from 2003.
2. Coaches' Poll started to be released in 1999.
