= Kendall Orange and Black football, 1895–1899 =

American college football seasons

This is a list of the first five seasons of what is now the Tulsa Golden Hurricane football program.

== 1895 ==
1895 Kendall Orange and Black football
- Conference: Independent
- Record: 1–0
- Head coach: Norman Leard (1st season)

1895 was the first year Henry Kendall College sponsored football. Only one game was played, a contest against the cross-town Indian University.

=== Schedule ===
Date	Opponent	Site	Result
Unknown	Indian University	Muskogee, Indian Territory	W no score recorded

== 1896 ==
1895 Kendall Orange and Black football
- Conference: Independent
- Record: 2–0–1
- Head coach: Norman Leard (2nd season)

=== Schedule ===
Date	Time	Opponent	Site	Result	Source
February 1, 1896	3:00 p.m.	Indian University	Muskogee, Indian Territory	W 0-0(Bacone forfeits during game)	
November 26	3:00 p.m.	Cherokee Male Seminary	Fair grounds; Muskogee, Indian Territory	W unrecorded	
December 11	3:15 p.m.	at Cherokee Male Seminary	Cherokee Male Seminary grounds; Tahlequa, Indian Territory	T 6–6	
All times are in Central time

== 1897 ==
1897 Kendall Orange and Black football
- Conference: Independent
- Record: 2–1
- Head coach: Norman Leard (3rd season)

=== Schedule ===
Date	Time	Opponent	Site	Result	Source
October 15	3:00 p.m.	at Cherokee Male Seminary	Tahlequah, Indian Territory	L 0–4	
October 25		Indian University	Fair grounds; Muskogee, Indian Territory	W 18–4	
November 12		Cherokee Male Seminary	Tahlequah, Indian Territory	W 6–4	
All times are in Central time

== 1898 ==
1898 Kendall Orange and Black football
- Conference: Independent
- Record: 2–0–2
- Head coach: Fred Taylor (1st season)

=== Schedule ===
Date	Opponent	Site	Result	Source
November 5	Indian University	Muskogee, Indian Territory	W 16–0	
November 13	at Cherokee Male Seminary	Cherokee Male Seminary grounds; Tahlequah, Indian Territory	T 0–0	
November 24	Cherokee Male Seminary	Muskogee, Indian Territory	T 5–5	
December 8	Arkansas Industrial	Muskogee, Indian Territory	W unrecorded	

== 1899 ==
1899 Kendall Orange and Black football
- Conference: Independent
- Record: 0–2–2
- Head coach: Fred Taylor (2nd season)

=== Schedule ===
Date	Time	Opponent	Site	Result	Attendance	Source
October 27		Arkansas	Muskogee, Indian Territory	L 0–11		
November 3		Arkansas	Muskogee, Indian Territory	T 0–0		
November 10		at Cherokee Male Seminary	Cherokee Male Seminary grounds; Tahlequah, Indian Territory	T 6–6		
December 25	4:05 p.m.	at Little Rock Athletics	West End Park; Little Rock, AR	L 6–6	1,000	
