= 1895 Chicago Athletic Association football team =

American football team season

1895 Chicago Athletic Association football
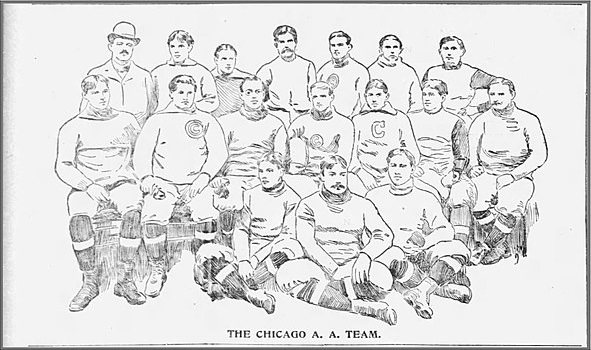
- Team sketch from Chicago Tribune
- League: Independent
- Record: 10–3–1
- Manager: Harry Cornish (3rd year)
- Captain: E. B. "Jake" Camp (1st half); Archibald Stevenson (2nd half)
- Home field: CAA Field

1895 Athletic Club football records
| | Conf. | | | Overall |
| Team | W | L | T | W | | L | | T |
|---|---|---|---|---|---|---|---|---|
| Entre Nous AA | | – | | 9 | – | 1 | – | 0 |
| Pittsburgh AC | | – | | 7 | – | 1 | – | 2 |
| Crescent AC | | – | | 8 | – | 2 | – | 1 |
| Greensburg AA | | – | | 8 | – | 2 | – | 1 |
| Chicago AA | | – | | 10 | – | 3 | – | 1 |
| Elmira AC | | – | | 6 | – | 2 | – | 0 |
| Illinois CC | | – | | 6 | – | 2 | – | 0 |
| New Jersey AC | | – | | 5 | – | 3 | – | 0 |
| Orange AC | | – | | 6 | – | 4 | – | 1 |
| Duquesne CAC | | – | | 4 | – | 3 | – | 1 |
| Noblesville AC | | – | | 3 | – | 3 | – | 2 |
| Newton AA | | – | | 4 | – | 4 | – | 1 |
| Louisville AC | | – | | 2 | – | 4 | – | 0 |
| Hyde Park AA | | – | | 0 | – | 3 | – | 2 |
| Syracuse AA | | – | | 1 | – | 5 | – | 0 |

The 1895 Chicago Athletic Association football team represented the Chicago Athletic Association (CAA) during the 1895 college football season. Under the management of Harry Cornish, the AAs athletic manager since the 1893 season, the CAA compiled a 10–3–1 record, including an exhibition game with the Swift & Co Stock Yarders. The CAA outscored its opponents by a total of 214 to 52 and achieved an undefeated record at home. The athletic association played its home games at CAA Field (formerly South Side Park), located on the corner of 35th Street and Wentworth Avenue in Chicago.

== Schedule ==
| Date | Time | Opponent | Site | Result | Attendance | Source |
|---|---|---|---|---|---|---|
| September 14 | | Swift & Co. | CAA Field; Chicago, IL | W 28–0 | | |
| September 28 | 3:30 p.m. | at Chicago | Marshall Field; Chicago, IL | L 0–8 | | |
| October 5 | 3:00 p.m. | Rush Medical | CAA Field; Chicago, IL | W 30–0 | | |
| October 12 | 3:30 p.m. | Illinois | CAA Field; Chicago, IL | W 8–0 | | |
| October 19 | | at Indianapolis Light Artillery | East Ohio Street grounds; Indianapolis, IN | W 16–0 | 400 | |
| October 22 | 4:20 p.m. | Rush-Lake Forest | CAA Field; Chicago, IL | W 30–0 | | |
| October 26 | | at Newton Athletic Club | Newton, MA | W 6–0 | 2,800 | |
| October 29 | 3:30 p.m. | at MIT | South End Grounds; Boston, MA | W 46–0 | 500 | |
| November 1 | | at Penn | Franklin Field; Philadelphia, PA | L 4–12 | | |
| November 5 | 3:45 p.m. | at Orange Athletic Club | East Orange Oval; Orange, NJ | L 0–24 | 4,000–9,000 | |
| November 7 | 3:40 p.m. | at Wilmington YMCA | Wilimington, DE | W 40–0 | 600–3,000 | |
| November 9 | 3:00 p.m. | at Duquesne Country and Athletic Club | Exposition Park; Allegheny City, PA | W 34–4 | 500 | |
| November 23 | 3:00 p.m. | Indianapolis Light Artillery | CAA Field; Chicago, IL | W 4–0 | 1,000 | |
| November 28 | 11:00 a.m. | Boston Athletic Association | CAA Field; Chicago, IL | T 4–4 | 6,000–7,000 | |

== Preseason ==
=== August ===
August 1: Captain E. B. "Jake" Camp began preparations for the 1895 Chicago AA football team. He asserted that the majority of last year's players would join.

=== September ===
September 7: An interest meeting was held in the club gymnasium. Returners from the 1894 team included John Slater, Oberne, Lucas, Brown, Jake Camp, and Ben Thomas. New players were R. E. Grout, R. T. Hoagland, E. M. Smith, C. B. Coffeen, Herbert A. Parkyn, D. A. Stone, R. Bartl, H. G. Hadden, L. McKinley, Harvey, Barr, and Gage. The experience of the men ranged from the high school team at Hyde Park, the local YMCA, minor teams like Oak park, athletic clubs like Chicago AA and Johnstown AC, and major colleges like Illinois, Michigan, Virginia Military Institute, Iowa, Minnesota, and Cornell. A schedule was announced for the season as well.

- September 14: vs. "Swift Eleven" at CAA field
- September 21: Englewood YMCA at CAA field
- October 5: Rush Medical College at West Side
- October 12: Illinois at CAA field
- October 19: Lake Forest in Chicago
- October 26 to November 9: a trip to play football teams in the East
- November 23: Rush Medical at CAA field
- November 28: (Thanksgiving Day): Boston Athletic Association

Games would also be arranged with Northwestern and Chicago universities, and a trip to California may be taken around Christmas time. Practices would begin on September 10, and be held every Tuesday and Thursday.

=== September 14: Swift & Co. ===
CAA vs. Swift & Co.

| Team | 1 | 2 | Total |
|---|---|---|---|
| Swift & Co. Stock Yarders | 0 | 0 | 0 |
| • Chicago AA | 12 | 16 | 28 |

- Date: September 14, 1895
- Location: CAA Field, Thirty-Fifth Street and Wentworth Avenue, Chicago, Il.
- Elapsed time: 40 minutes (20 minute halves)

Chicago AA defeated the Swift & Co. Stock Yarders 28 to 0 at their own CAA field. The game was an exhibition for the coming season, and so the Stock Yarders were given a chance to continue playing many times after fumbles and turnovers. CAA played well, scoring six touchdowns, although there was an instance where Thompson, playing left tackle, accidentally tackled Captain Camp, confusing him for a Stock-Yard player, and consequentially stopped a sure touchdown for the AA.

September 16: A game is arranged with Chicago University for the twenty-eighth of September at Marshall Field. It was dubbed as the first real contest for each team.

September 18: The Armour Institute of Technology released their schedule for 1895, and they were set to play the CAA on October 16.

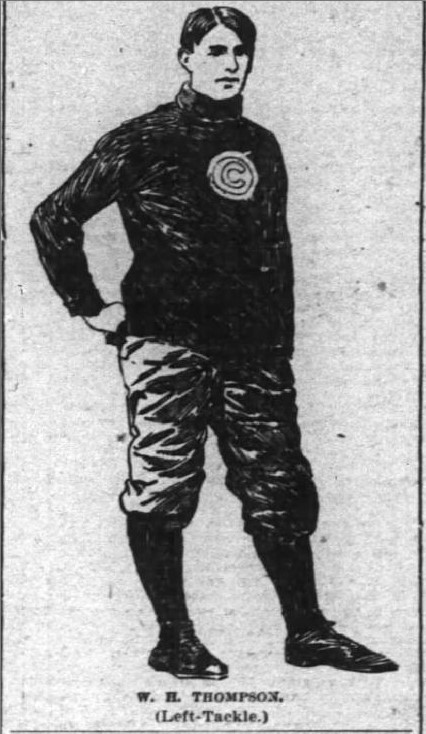
A sketch of left tackle W. H. Thompson in a September 19th article of the Daily Inter Ocean

September 21: Englewood YMCA didn't show up for their match with Chicago AA. The team instead played against itself, with some additional players from Swift & Co. The "regulars" won 4–0 in a 30-minute contest.

== Regular season ==
=== September 28: Chicago ===
CAA vs. Chicago

| Team | 1 | 2 | Total |
|---|---|---|---|
| CAA | 0 | 0 | 0 |
| • Chicago | 8 | 0 | 8 |

- Date: September 28, 1895
- Location: Marshall Field, fifty-seventh street and Ellis avenue, Chicago, IL
- Game start: 3:30pm
- Elapsed time: 120 minutes (The two halves were either 20 or 25 minutes each)
- Game weather: Light rain
- Referee: J. Rafferty

Chicago AA lost to the Chicago University Maroons, 0–8, in their first recognized game of the 1895 season. It was an overcast day with a light drizzle. Chicago AA's quarterback was injured in the game, although it was slight. Chicago AA was favored 3–2 over Chicago. Chicago would hold CAA scoreless, which would only happen again in the athletic associations blowout loss to Orange AC. Stone was credited with the best CAA performance of the day, along with right halfback Slater. The attendance figure is unknown, but there was reportedly a large crowd around Marshall field spectating the affair.

=== October ===
October 2: There was a report that star center Archibald Stevenson would play for Rush Medical for the remainder of their 1895 season, but this claim would never materialize.

=== October 5: Rush Medical College ===
CAA vs. Rush Medical

| Team | 1 | 2 | Total |
|---|---|---|---|
| Rush Medical | 0 | 0 | 0 |
| • Chicago AA | 6 | 24 | 30 |

- Date: October 5, 1895
- Location: CAA field
- Game start: 3pm
- Elapsed time: 50 minutes (25 minute halves)
- Referee: Ben Donnelly

Chicago AA defeated Rush Medical 30 to 0. It was reported that a great deal of fumbles killed any chance for Rush Medical to win the contest. Another report speculates that Chicago AA would have scored yet another touchdown, but were only given 3 downs instead of 4 by mistake. Slater had the best performance, and scored the most touchdowns in the game. Haddon, Hoagland, and Thompson also scored. The most points of the day were the result of fullback Brown and his five PATs (at the time called goals after touchdowns, and worth 2 points) for 10 points.

October 8: Mr. Cornish sent a letter to Chicago's athletic department, requesting a 2nd game between them and Chicago AA. He cited the 1894 season, where Chicago AA successfully defeated the university team in late September, but agreed to a 2nd contest so Chicago could get a 2nd chance (which they would capitalize on with a 20 to 0 win over the athletic association in mid October). He asserts that this would be nothing but practice for the Maroons, and he is not challenging, but merely suggesting another game should be played if convenient.

October 10: Chicago AA practiced with Rush Medical in preparation of their October 12 matchup with the Illinois Fighting Illini football team. During this practice, the AA players decide to practice several "feint" (trick) plays, most notably the "criss-cross" play, which isn't explained, but appears numerous times throughout the remainder of the season and greatly benefited CAA's offense.

=== October 12: Illinois ===
CAA vs. Illinois

| Team | 1 | 2 | Total |
|---|---|---|---|
| Illinois | 0 | 0 | 0 |
| • Chicago AA | 4 | 4 | 8 |

- Date: October 12, 1895
- Location: CAA field
- Game start: 3:30pm
- Elapsed time: 50 minutes (25 minute halves)
- Referee: Crawford

Chicago AA defeated Illinois8 to 0 at CAA field. Illinois came into the game 1–0 after a 48 to 0 clobbering of Wabash, while the CAA was fresh off their blowout of Rush Medical. Camp and Parkyn scored the two AA touchdowns, Camp in particular was a surprise in the CAA line-up, as he had just recently come from a sick bed and was reportedly in no condition to play. Slater was mentioned as playing the best game, with many gains down the left side of the field, as that was Illinois' weak spot. Duquesne Country and Athletic Club (DC&AC) would also release their schedule for the 1895 football season, which included a game with Chicago AA on November 9.

October 16: The match against Lake Forest was postponed to October 22. In the meantime, the CAA arranged a game with the Indianapolis Light Artillery, who were seeking a match to start off their 1895 season. The contest would be held October 19 in Indianapolis, and a congregation of CAA supporters would decide to make the trip to Indiana for this game.

=== October 19: Indianapolis Light Artillery (first match) ===
CAA vs. ILA

| Team | 1 | 2 | Total |
|---|---|---|---|
| • Chicago AA | 16 | 0 | 16 |
| Indianapolis Light Artillery | 0 | 0 | 0 |

- Date: October 19, 1895
- Location: East Ohio St. Grounds, Indianapolis, IN
- Elapsed time: 50 minutes (25 minute halves)
- Game attendance: 400
- Referee: G. W. Cohen

In Chicago AA's first game outside of Chicago, the athletics managed to stack up 16 unanswered points in the 1st half to win uncontested, 16 to 0 against the Artillery. This was one of the first games played in Indianapolis in 1895, as the city had "opened" the football season on the same day. The Indianapolis Journal described the CAA team as a machine, and gave credit to Brown, Slater, Camp, Hadden and Coffeen for good runs. Thompson made the first touchdown, followed by Brown, and then Camp, with Brown going 2 for 3 on PATs. The ILA team had some minor disagreements with the referring, but overall claimed the CAA had great teamwork, and was well trained in interference (blocking and tackling).

October 22: Mr. Mulliken, a man with past experience at Columbia and on the Crescent Athletic Club of Brooklyn, decides to join the Chicago AA eleven. CAA also began preparation for their journey to the east, and sent out the first roster of those going. The initial list was, Stone and Thompson as left ends, Thomas left tackle, Ryan left guard, Stevenson center, Bartl and Mulliken right guards, McCormick right tackle, Hadden right end, Aldrich quarterback, Coffeen, Blaney and Hoagland right halfbacks, Slater left halfback, and Brown fullback. Camp would not attend the trip east due to ill health. Another important event to note is the football teams of Rush Medical College and Lake Forest combining for the remainder of the 1895 season. Rush would bolster the Lake Forest ranks, while also attempting Lake Forest's reportedly impossible schedule of Northwestern, Michigan, and Illinois, who at the time had a combined record of 9–3, with Michigan undefeated. Lake Forest had also just come from contests between the likes of Wisconsin and Chicago, who had beaten them 52 to 0 and 26 to 5 respectively. They had even lost to the minor team Armour, 6 to 0, and so when a merger was proposed between them and Rush, the agreement was made. The two teams hoped to stand a better chance against the CAA as well when they play them this afternoon.

=== October 22: Rush-Lake Forest ===
CAA vs. Rush-Lake Forest

| Team | 1 | 2 | Total |
|---|---|---|---|
| Rush-lake Forest | 0 | 0 | 0 |
| • CAA | 18 | 12 | 30 |

- Date: October 22, 1895
- Location: CAA Field, Chicago, IL
- Elapsed time: 40 minutes (1st half 25 minutes, 2nd half 15 minutes)
- Referee: Hoagland

The contest was yet another blowout for the semi-professionals, as Rush-Lake Forest suffered from injury, and CAA's FB Brown had a perfect 5 for 5 PAT streak, culminating in a 30 to 0 shellacking of the makeshift college team. Thomas scored the first touchdown, followed by Blaney twice to end the first half. Blaney attained another touchdown at the beginning of the next half, with Thomas also scoring the last touchdown, and Brown rounding out the score to 30 with his impeccable kicking. Although the score is large, one writer for The Inter Ocean newspaper claimed that CAA played horribly. He asserted that "if yesterday's showing is a test of the ability at the game, it [The Chicago AA team] would have to work hard to defeat the Yohokas Pigskin Pelters or any like organization." In other news, the CAA would hold a practice with the Illinois Cycling Club this afternoon, the last practice before their trip east on October 24 at 10:30 A. M.

=== Eastern trip ===
October 24: The football team left this morning. Because of E. B. Camp's continued absence from ill health, Center Archibald Stevenson was appointed as new captain for the Chicago Athletics. The final lineup for those leaving with the team were Stone, Thompson, Stevenson, McCormick, Hadden, Huddelson, Aldrich, Slater, Brown, Blaney, Coffeen, Brown, and Mulliken. The first game scheduled in the East was against the Newton Athletic Club of Boston on October 26.

October 25: The schedule for Chicago AA's trip was highlighted by the Chicago Inter Ocean.

- October 25: CAA arrives in Boston, and will be staying at the Copley Square Hotel
- October 26: A game against Newton AC in Boston, MA
- October 29: A game against MIT in Cambridge, MA,
- November 1: A game against Penn in Philadelphia, Pennsylvania
- November 2: The team goes to watch the Harvard–Princeton football game
- November 5: A game against Orange AC in East Orange, NJ
- November 7: CAA leaves for Wilmington, Delaware, to play the local YMCA team, then travels to Pittsburgh, and will stay at Hotel Schlosser
- November 9: A game against Duquesne Country and Athletic Club in Pittsburgh, PA
- November 10: The team arrives back in Chicago

Penn and Orange AC were outlined as the most difficult games of the trip, with the Penn Quakers in particular on a ten-game win streak, along with having outscored their opponents 298 to 0. A Thanksgiving Day game against the Boston Athletic Association was also scheduled.

=== October 26: Newton AC ===
CAA vs Newton AC

| Team | 1 | 2 | Total |
|---|---|---|---|
| • Chicago AA | 0 | 6 | 6 |
| Newton AC | 0 | 0 | 0 |

- Date: October 26, 1895
- Location: CAA Field, Chicago, IL
- Elapsed time: 50 minutes (two 25 minute halves)
- Game attendance: 2800
- Referee: F. R. Peters (1st half), W. Hoag (2nd half)

In the first contest of C.A.A's trip east, the Athletics edged the men of Newton AC in the closing seconds of the first half. Under the watchful eyes of 2800 spectators, CAA had the ball on Newton's 5 yard line, with 35 seconds to go. First, second, and third down went by with no gain for the Chicago AA eleven. With 10 seconds remaining, it was still Chicago's possession, and with one last shove at the Newton defensive line, fullback Brown rolled into the endzone over a mass of players, achieving a walk-off touchdown and subsequent PAT. The game could have been won in the first half, had Chicago AA not fumbled on the Newton AC 4 yard line, but besides that the game was close and both sides held up well. Stevenson was the center of attention for the Athletics, holding the line firm and knocking back Newton's star player, Fred Draper, numerous times throughout the contest. Brown also had a good game, and Bartl got injured.

=== October 29: MIT ===
CAA vs MIT

| Team | 1 | 2 | Total |
|---|---|---|---|
| • Chicago AA | 24 | 22 | 46 |
| MIT Engineers | 0 | 0 | 0 |

- Date: October 29, 1895
- Location: Cambridge, MA
- Game start: 3:30pm EST
- Elapsed time: 40 minutes (two 20 minute halves)
- Game attendance: 500
- Referee: F. R. Peters

CAA crushed the MIT engineers at their own field in Cambridge, MA. The two teams were in poor condition, but MIT was worse, having six substitutes starting, instead of their more experienced players. The football teams had also played a tie game in 1894, where both organizations were in their prime. Slater was yet again a star player, pulling off 3 touchdowns, while Hadden played well in his new right tackle position, and scored 3 touchdowns himself. Brown also had a great day, going 7 for 8 in PATs, with 2 touchdowns of his own. Other players that put points on the board for CAA was Thomas with two and Huddelston with one. With 4 minutes left to play the game was called, as MIT had absolutely no chance of recovering the deficit, and were thoroughly defeated.

October 31: The Philadelphia Inquirer named Chicago AA,"strongest eleven in the west, college or otherwise." The game against Penn decided to be at 3:00 in the afternoon, with an admission of 50 cents, and an extra 25 for reserved seating. It would be played at Penn's own Franklin Field, on the corner of 33rd and Spruce streets. The last time the Chicago Athletic Association played the Pennsylvania Quakers, it was 1892, and the situation at hand was remarkably similar to that of the 1895 contest. Penn was 10–0, having shut out 9 and outscored their opponents 349 to 6. Chicago lost that contest 10 to 12, but was the first opponent of the season to scored double digits against the Quakers.

=== November 1: Penn ===
CAA vs Penn

| Team | 1 | 2 | Total |
|---|---|---|---|
| Chicago AA | 0 | 4 | 4 |
| • Penn Quakers | 4 | 8 | 12 |

- Date: November 1, 1895
- Location: Franklin Field, Philadelphia, PA
- Game start: 3pm EST

CAA played rough, dirty in the eyes of some, as they lost to the superior university team of Pennsylvania, 4 to 12. CAA came into this prime matchup 6–1, while outscoring their opponents 142 to 8, and recording 6 shutouts. Penn on the other hand, was 10–0, having shut out all ten opponents, and outscoring them 370 to 0. They had won the last 22 contests they had played in, 19 being shutouts, and had not lost a contest since November 30, 1893, against the Harvard Crimson. The game was actually considered a success for the CAA, as it was the first points scored against the Eastern school in their 1895 season. Chicago AA was also the first team in the 1895 season to tie Penn at some point in the game (besides a 0–0 tie of course, as every contest starts off with both teams tied at 0), when Slater managed to score on Quakers, 4–4, midway through the 2nd half. The Penn team was so beaten up by the semi-pros, John C. Bell, head of the university football committee, took out his Penn players in the fear that too many players would get injured. Seeing as the score was still tied 4 to 4, he eventually let his players back in, where they would score two unanswered touchdowns for the final 4 to 12 score. Penn was furious after the game, and on November 7, they officially declared that the school would never play another athletic club, association, or non-collegiate team again, cancelling their 1895 matchup against undefeated Boston AA. The university juggernauts would end the season 14–0, and were declared national champions by the Billingsley Report, Helms Athletic Foundation, Houlgate System, National Championship Foundation, and co-national champions with Yale by well-known football historian Parke H. Davis (all retroactively).

November 4: The CAA football team was looked after by the upstart Manhattan Athletic Club. They were allowed to hold a daily practice on Manhattan Field, and at the city gym in NYC. The Inter Ocean newspaper reported on a speculated, "four-cornered" athletic league, between the Chicago, Boston, Crescent, and Orange Athletic Associations.

November 5: The CAA was again dubbed champions of the West, this time by The Sun (New York City), ahead of their match against the Orange Athletic Club. The New Jersey–based organization currently held a mediocre 3–2–1 record, although those two losses were against Lafayette (final record of 6–2) and Yale (final record of 13–0–2, and co national champion by Davis), and the tie was against Princeton (final record 10–1–1).

=== November 5: Orange Athletic Club ===
CAA vs Orange AC

| Team | 1 | 2 | Total |
|---|---|---|---|
| Chicago AA | 0 | 0 | 0 |
| • Orange AC | 12 | 12 | 24 |

- Date: November 5, 1895
- Location: Orange Oval, Orange, NJ
- Game start: 3:45pm EST
- Elapsed time: 70 minutes (two 35 minute halves)
- Game attendance: 3,000–9,000
- Referee: Laurie Bliss

CAA suffered their only loss against a non-collegiate football team, getting blanked by the superior athletic club in front of the biggest crowd they would see that year. Hadden had the best performance of the day for Chicago as right tackle, while Slater also played well against the Jersey men. Although this was a crushing defeat, CAA did not lose its contention for Champions of the West, as Eastern organizations like Orange AC did not hold much weight in the "standings" that sportswriters in the Midwest factored into their opinions. A record of the attendance for the game is highly contested, with 4 different newspapers given figures of three, four, five, and nine thousand. Orange AC would finish 6–4–1, beating Navy 10 to 6, forfeiting their game against Crescent AC for a 0–2 "loss", losing their rematch against Yale 0 to 26, and finally playing Crescent AC on Thanksgiving Day for a 10–0 shutout. Their scrub (practice) team also beat Elmira AC 6 to 0, and their consolidated (combined) team lost to the Entré Nous Club of Paterson, 0–10.

=== November 7: Wilmington YMCA ===
CAA vs Wilmington YMCA

| Team | 1 | 2 | Total |
|---|---|---|---|
| • Chicago AA | 22 | 18 | 40 |
| Wilmington YMCA | 0 | 0 | 0 |

- Date: November 7, 1895
- Location: Union Street gridiron, Wilmington, DE
- Game start: 3:40pm EST
- Elapsed time: 45 minutes (1st half 25 minutes, 2nd half 20 minutes)
- Game attendance: 600–3,000
- Referee: Gelbert

CAA demolished the local YMCA of Wilmington, Delaware, 40–0 in their most dominating victory of 1895. Blaney, Coffeen, and Thomas all had a good day, with Thomas tallying three touchdowns, and Blaney scoring on an 85-yard run. With fullback Brown not playing, for unknown reasons, Huddelson took over that duty. He would go a perfect 6 for 6 on PATs (at the time called goals after touchdowns). Hadden would also score 2 touchdowns, and Coffeen scored another on a 75-yard run. There was betting among the spectators that Chicago AA would reach the "century-mark" (100 points), which at that time was incredibly more common than it is in the modern (post-WWII) era of football. YMCA only had the ball three times throughout the entire contest, and each of those possessions ended with a YMCA fumble. A reporter for the Chicago Tribune, who wrote an account of the game, mused that the YMCA boys were "saplings in a tornado." After the game, CAA would head back up to Pennsylvania on the B&O Railroad, for their game against the Duquesne Country and Athletic Club of Pittsburgh.

November 8: An article in The Pittsburgh Press states that after their crushing defeat from Orange AC, the New Jersey athletic club is slated to be the 1895 "Athletic Club Champions". They also highlight how Chicago AA could still win the informal tile. If Boston AA beats Crescent AA, Crescent AA defeats Orange AC, and Boston AA loses their Thanksgiving Day contest against the CAA, then Chicago would have a legitimate claim to the distinction. The players arrived today in Pittsburgh, reportedly exhausted, and went right to bed. Shortly after noon, they rose to practice at Exposition Park, ahead of their match against DC&AC. After the practice, Brown met up with an old college friend, Ed Young, who was captaining the Duquesne team, and they spent their day talking over the old Cornell days.

=== November 9: Duquesne Country and Athletic Club ===
CAA vs DCAC

| Team | 1 | 2 | Total |
|---|---|---|---|
| • Chicago AA | 24 | 10 | 34 |
| Duquesne Country AC | 0 | 4 | 4 |

- Date: November 9, 1895
- Location: Exposition Park, Pittsburgh, PA
- Game start: 3pm EST
- Game attendance: 500
- Referee: Greenwood

The Chicago Athletics faced off against the Duquesne C&AC on November 9, pulling out a 34 to 4 thumping, although allowing the Pittsburgh men an uncharacteristic touchdown. It was a muddy day on Exposition Field. Six different men scored points for this game, a CAA record for the year. Thomas garnered two touchdowns, while Blaney, Hadden, Brown, and Slater each tallied a score. For the first time in 1895, two different men scored PATs for the Athletics, Huddelson with three and Brown with one, and CAA also got its first known points off of the other team, when they blocked a kick in the endzone and DC&AC player Vaill fell on it for a safety. Blaney was not actually supposed to be present, as he told the team the day before he was going to visit his folks in Pittsburgh. After this game, the team left for their home in Chicago. They had gone 4–2 on their eastern trip, an impressive total for a journey that lasted less than two weeks. Stevenson, Barter, Hadden, and Blaney did not leave with the team though, instead staying in Pitt to hear cash offers from the Duquesne and Pittsburgh Athletic Clubs to play for them instead. None of them would knowingly end up accepting this money, although it is unknown what Barter decided.

November 13- Bob Wrenn, Harvard's star quarterback, agreed to play his position for CAA in their Thanksgiving Day game against Boston AA. He had been refereeing many games throughout Chicago while he stayed in the city, including Chicago vs Wisconsin on November 2, Chicago vs Northwestern on the 16th, and Wisconsin vs Minnesota the day after that in Minneapolis. He was absent from the roster of the CAA and so it is assumed that he did not follow through with his reported confirmation. He was also still in Chicago at the time, as he was the umpire for Indiana vs Wabash the day after Thanksgiving. There was no follow-up piece to explain why he did not play with the CAA on November 28, but he would not be there for the contest in a playing capacity, with Bill Aldrich leading the Athletic men instead.

November 14-The football committee of the Chicago Athletic Association held a meeting on their current roster, and decided it would not be good enough for their games ahead. They stated that only five of their starting eleven were "first class" (there is no mention of who those players were). Manager Cornish was told to scour the Northwest for players, and to especially seek out the infamous "Pudge" Heffelfinger, who was currently coaching at Minnesota, along with any good halfbacks and tackles. The object was to get the best from Beloit, Lake Forest, and any other top colleges in the region. The remaining contests were a rematch with the Indianapolis Light Artillery on November 23, first mentioned today, and the Thanksgiving game against BAA.

November 15- Several mid and northwest universities voiced their displeasure in the new CAA endeavor to find more skilled players for their football team. Possible targets were narrowed down to Northwestern halfbacks, Captain Jesse Van Doozer and Potter, Captain Woolsey from Lake Forest, and player-coaches Heffelfinger and Atkinson from Minnesota and Beloit respectively.

November 20- The infamous Pudge Heffelfinger becomes the first man to accept manager Cornish's call for players, and agrees to play with the CAA in their Thanksgiving Day contest. This was great news for the team, as Pudge was a 3-time All-American and played at Yale prior to his short coaching career with Minnesota.

November 23- Van Doozer and Potter both agree to play for the CAA. Northwestern reportedly did not object to the decision, as long as he returned to the university for football after the contest.

=== November 23: Indianapolis Light Artillery (rematch) ===
CAA vs ILA

| Team | 1 | 2 | Total |
|---|---|---|---|
| Chicago AA | 0 | 0 | 0 |
| • Indianapolis Light Artillery | 0 | 4 | 4 |

- Date: November 23, 1895
- Location: CAA Field, Chicago, IL
- Game start: 3pm
- Game attendance: 1,000
- Referee: C. Allen

CAA defeated the much-improved Indianapolis Light Artillery team of Indiana on an icy November afternoon. ILA came into the contest with new players just like CAA, the most notable being star Pennyslvannia halfback Winchester Osgood, along with players from Yale, Harvard, Princeton, Purdue, and Butler. CAA did not actually employ their entire starting roster, saving Hadden and Brown for the BAA game (the players Cornish had recruited recently would also not show up until the Thanksgiving Day game). It was a rough and rowdy affair for players and spectators. The crowd was reportedly unruly, with manager Cornish getting a punch to the nose by a rogue onlooker, and the police barely being able to keep the crowd off the muddy field. Thomas scored the single CAA touchdown in the 2nd half for a bare 4–0 win, defeating any chance for the ILA to avenge their late October loss.

November 24- Coach Stickney of Wisconsin University agreed to play halfback for the CAA on Thanksgiving. The leader of his football team, Captain Richards, has yet to be confirmed. Richards will play according to some Madison Businessmen "in the know", while Richards' fraternity brothers denies this claim. If he does play he would be put in as fullback.

November 25- Preparations for the BAA-CAA game were nearly complete, with addition seats added to CAA "stadium" to accommodate for three thousand more. An addition three thousand were suspected to stand around the field as well. Tickets were also sold for special box seats on Carriages next to the stadium.

November 26- In an article for the Daily Inter Ocean, Pudge Heffelfinger declared that this Thanksgiving contest would be his last appearance as a player or coach, and he is retiring from athletics to get married. Another article states that the Boston AA and Chicago AA contest, combined with the college game of Chicago vs Michigan, would go down as the greatest day of Chicago football up to this point.

November 27- The day before Chicago AA's Thanksgiving Day showdown against the Boston AA, the whole city of Chicago was in a buzz. The Chicago AA colors of cherry, black, and white, were seen on streamers, banners, pins, ribbons, and commemorative buttons were worn and sold throughout the day. The Chicago Tribune went so far as to report, "never before in the history of Western football have so many players of national reputation been got together on a Western field as will meet tomorrow at the Chicago Athletic Association field tomorrow forenoon at 11 o'clock." An analysis of the two teams were written in the newspaper, including a list of their game records, and a comparison of their players based on position. CAA would come into this game 9–2, not including the game against Swift & Co., while BAA was undefeated, albeit with 3 ties, 6–0–3. On this assessment alone CAA would be seen as the better team, but BAA's 3 ties were against Crescent AC, which was another contender for the title of most accomplished athletic club team of 1895, Yale, which would go 13–0–2 in 1895, to be named co-national champion by Parke Davis, and finally Harvard, which ended 8–2–1, with losses only to a good Princeton team and consensus national champion Penn. In terms of impressive wins, both teams were lacking, but CAA prevailed with their shutouts of major college Illinois 8 to 0, and an impressive Indianapolis Artillery team 16 to 0, while Boston AAs best win was against minor college Amherst, 20 to 0. Comparing shutouts, CAA had seven, while BAA had five, but CAA suffered more shutouts from opposing teams (two), than BAA (zero). CAA had outscored its opponents 210 to 48 in 12 official games, an average of 17.5 to 4 per game, and BAA had outscored its opponents 142 to 8 in 9 games, 15.8 to 0.9 for a points per game average. Based on this, Chicago AA had a slightly more productive offense, while Boston AA held the advantage on defense. After a comparison of the players, Chicago AA was heavier man for man, with the exception of a couple substitutes. The matchup of tackles Pudge Heffelfinger for CAA and Bert Waters for BAA was highly coveted, as both men had been All-Americans multiple times, and were heralded as "the heroes of many hard-fought games, and each will try to outplay the other." Including both teams, members of former colleges had come from Harvard, Yale, Knox, Dartmouth, Wisconsin, Northwestern, Boston University, MIT, Minnesota, Michigan, and Butler, some very recently, to play in the athletic club's season, or just for the Thanksgiving Day game. The final analysis of the two teams is that they are generally equal, with neither one particularly favored to win. In the evening, the Boston and Chicago AA players went to a performance of Bonnie Scott at McVicker's theatre, and then had a grand dinner together.

=== November 28: Boston AA ===
CAA vs BAA

| Team | 1 | 2 | Total |
|---|---|---|---|
| Chicago AA | 4 | 0 | 4 |
| Boston AA | 0 | 4 | 4 |

- Date: November 28, 1895
- Location: CAA Field, Chicago, IL
- Game start: 11:00 AM
- Game attendance: 6,000–10,000
- Referee: F. R. Peters

The first Thanksgiving Day game of the Chicago AA football team was in 1888, when the team was known as the "All-Chicago" team, composed mostly of football club members from the nearby University of Chicago. They would clobber Michigan 24 to 4, and go on to win four of the next six Thanksgiving Day contests, shown below:

- 1888- All Chicago 24, Michigan 4
- 1889- All-Chicago 16, Michigan 0
- 1890- All-Chicago 8, Cornell 12
- 1891- Chicago AA 12, Cornell 4
- 1892- Chicago AA 12, Boston AA 18
- 1893- Chicago AA 8, Boston AA 4
- 1894- Chicago AA 8, Dartmouth 4

As seen from the record above, this was not the first time Chicago AA had played the Boston Athletic Association in a Thanksgiving Day football game, with the two clubs playing twice in 1892–98, both Chicago victories. The 1895 edition of the contest was widely acclaimed by Eastern and Western sports journalists on the day before the game, and somewhere between seven and ten thousand spectators attended the contest in Chicago. With both teams considered very similar in individual player stats, win–loss records, and margins of victory, it was only fitting that the two Athletic Associations tied, 4 to 4. The Chicago Tribune gives a full account of the game, along with personal opinions and accounts from the players, captains, coaches, crowd, the referees, and the writer themselves. The game, along with the Michigan vs. Chicago contest (Michigan won 12 to 0) made the front cover of their November 28 edition.

==== 1st half ====
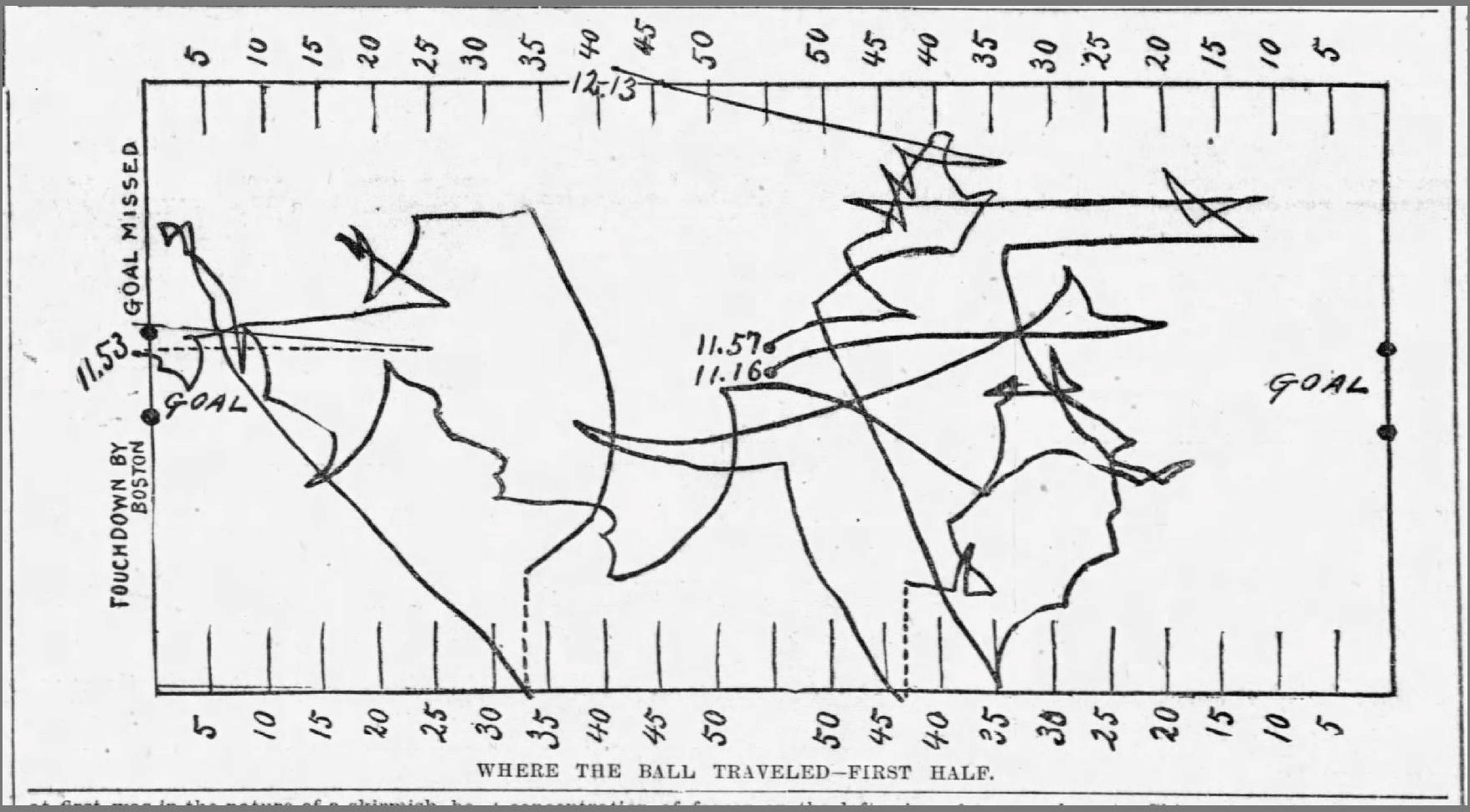
Where the ball traveled in the first half.

Captain Stevenson won the coin toss and chose to kick first. Richards punted the ball to the BAA 20-yard line, on a low and bouncy kick. Smith recovered the football and was tackled before gaining any ground. The BAA was held firm, and decided to punt off the ball to assess how strong CAA would play on offense, to determine their style of play.

Brown caught the kick and gained no yards. On the next play Thomas was instructed by Stevenson to run the ball between the right guard and tackle, and gained 5 yards. The same play was tried again with Richards, but he was stuffed at the line of scrimmage. Van Doozer went between a tackle and end, and made a short gain. On 4th down Richards was called an again, but was tackled behind the line by Bert Waters on a slow pitch play, and the ball was turned over to BAA. After these possessions, the teams decided there plans of action. Boston AA would routinely attack the left side of the CAA line, while Chicago AA would try to run through the center and right half of Boston AA. These accounted for the majority of gains throughout the rest of the game.

Boston AA tried to run Gonterman around CAA's right end, but he was quickly sacked for a 5-yard loss, and the BAA captain decided that end runs would be near-impossible with the poor field condition. Unable to make the necessary gains for a first down after Gonterman's loss, BAA decided to punt, but the throw from the center to BAA quarterback Curtis was poor, and the kick was blocked, with W. H. Thompson coming down with the ball for Chicago AA.

Since the two teams determined going through the center was the only reasonable way of gaining yards, Ben Thomas was sent through the right guard, but was tackled for loss. On the next play Brown managed to break through the center for 2 yards, and Thompson did the same for a short gain, largely thanks to the blocking of Stevenson, McCormick, and Heffelfinger. Richards, a recent addition to the Chicago AA lineup, made his first yards for the CAA, running through BAA right guard LeMoyne for another short gain. New right halfback Van Doozer would have his first on the next play, going a few yards in an opening made by Ben Thomas between LeMoyne and Russell, but was stopped by the BAA backfield. The BAA center was holding well so Richards tried running through the right end for no gain. Thomas tried breaking through the Center one more time but slipped in the snow and was unable to block Bert Waters. CAA ran out of downs and turned the ball over to BAA.

Anthony, Boston AA's left halfback, led the next two downs with a solid 8-yard run through CAA's left tackle (Thompson), and again for a small gain. Fullback Curtis found a rare hole in the center and ran for another gain of 8, being brought down by Thomas. Waters pounded through the line for 5 yards, hitting at Chicago AA's weaker left side. Gonterman would try an end run on the next play, but again it was stopped for no gain. Anthony was given the ball and made 5 yards for the first down through Thompson. He sent through again but gained practically nothing after Thomas tackled him. The same tactics were employed over and over again, with short gains of 2 to 5 yards. Finally Boston AA was taken back when Hudelson tackled Anthony for a 2-yard loss. On the very next play, Curtis broke through the line between guard and tackle, and ran 20 yards to the CAA 5-yard line. Anthony was put to work again and cut the yards-from-goal to 3. The Chicago line reportedly tightened and the Boston players were forced back on the next play. This play would also lead to a minor scuffle, as a Chicago AA player managed to get the ball during the assault, and Bert Waters tackled him and tried to take the ball from him on the ground. Thompson saw the scheme and jerked Waters away, and then Curtis interfered and a minor fight broke out. The referees eventually ruled to give Boston AA the ball on the reasoning that it had been downed by a Boston AA player and taken from him by the CAA player. The CAA line managed to push BAA back again, and turned the ball over on downs near their goal line.

1st, 2nd, and 3rd down went by with short gains by Richards, Brown, and Thomas, and on 4th down, rather than risk the chance of losing the ball so close to the goal line, a kick was called. Richards was signaled, and successfully punted the ball 25 yards to Curtis.

After no gain on 1st down, Curtis made the best gain of the day, running 25 yards down the left side, guarded by a group of blockers led by Bert Waters. On the next play Boston got called for off-sides and moved back 10 yards. The play after that, Russell was knocked out for a few minutes, and the team surgeons deliberated before allowing him back on his feet. The Heavyweight Anthony was tried again through the end and tackle, but was stopped by Van Doozer after 3 yards. The right end was attempted, but failed once again, with Chicago AA taking the ball on downs.

The Boston AA line was getting harder to break through, and with no chance of gaining the 5 yards needed for a 1st down, Brown attempted a kick. The kick would be blocked though, and Russell fell on it for crucial CAA loss. By this point, the ball was near Chicago AA's goal line again.

First down saw the ball reach CAA's 5-yard line, by 2nd down it was on the 1-yard mark, and on 3rd down Anthony was sent over for the first touchdown of the game. The ensuing extra point, or goal after touchdown as it was called back then, was missed by Russel, as the ball was reportedly wet and slippery.

Richards kicked off, but Bert Waters blocked it with his bare hands, and Richards fell on it for no gain. The game tempo began to speed up, with both teams beginning to play fast, continuing their tactics of attacking the weak side of the line for small gains. Van Doozer was signaled to take the ball, but the guards did not make a big opening for him, and he only gained a yard. The same run was tried again with Thompson (he did not usually play as a Back) through the right guard, but the experiment failed, with BAA's right wing holding strong.

Boston AA would get the ball on turnover of downs, but Chicago AA held firm and soon got the ball back.

On the first down Slater made a spectacular run for 15 yards down the west side of the field. After a few short gains the BAA line held, and the ball was turned over yet again.

Gonterman tried yet another end run, and managed to gain the first yards of that play for either team, running for 3, but the CAA line held well, and Boston AA decided to kick prematurely. Once again the execution failed, as Curtis failed to catch the ball passed back from his quarterback, and the ball rolled to BAA's 10 yard line, with Curtis right after it, followed by Van Doozer, who sacked Curtis for a massive BAA loss. Boston AA immediately punted again, and Richards muffed the kick, allowing BAA to take the ball at a comfortable midfield. Boston AA kicked for the third time in a row (most likely attempting to run out the clock, as that was seem as a legitimate option in 19th century football), and Richards plunged into the snow on the sideline and fell on it. Time was called with the ball on Chicago AA's 40-yard line.

==== 2nd half ====
During the halftime, the CAA team held a meeting, and it was decided that Heffelfinger would move to right behind the left side of the line, to patch up any weakness it might have had. Russell kicked off, and the ball went flying over the goal line. On the 2nd attempt, Brown caught the punt and began to run, but fell over and fumbled the ball. Luckily it was recovered by Thompson, who fell on it immediately. Deciding to play a punting game, Brown was told to punt the ball back. Bert Waters tried to stop it, but he was too late, and the ball flew to the BAA 20 yard line, where Dick Waters (there were two players on the BAA team with the last name of Waters, whether or not they are related is unknown) fell on it.

Chicago AA held the line, and soon had the ball again with a great position to score. It looked like CAA would tie the game up with three short gains by Heffelfinger, but a fumble on a backwards pass lost this advantage, and Boston AA recovered.

Curtis made another run of 15 yards down the left side of the field, and was tackled in a joint Heffelfinger and Brown attack. A fumble ensued on the following play, but BAA recovered it. They would make no more gains though, and punted off to Slater.

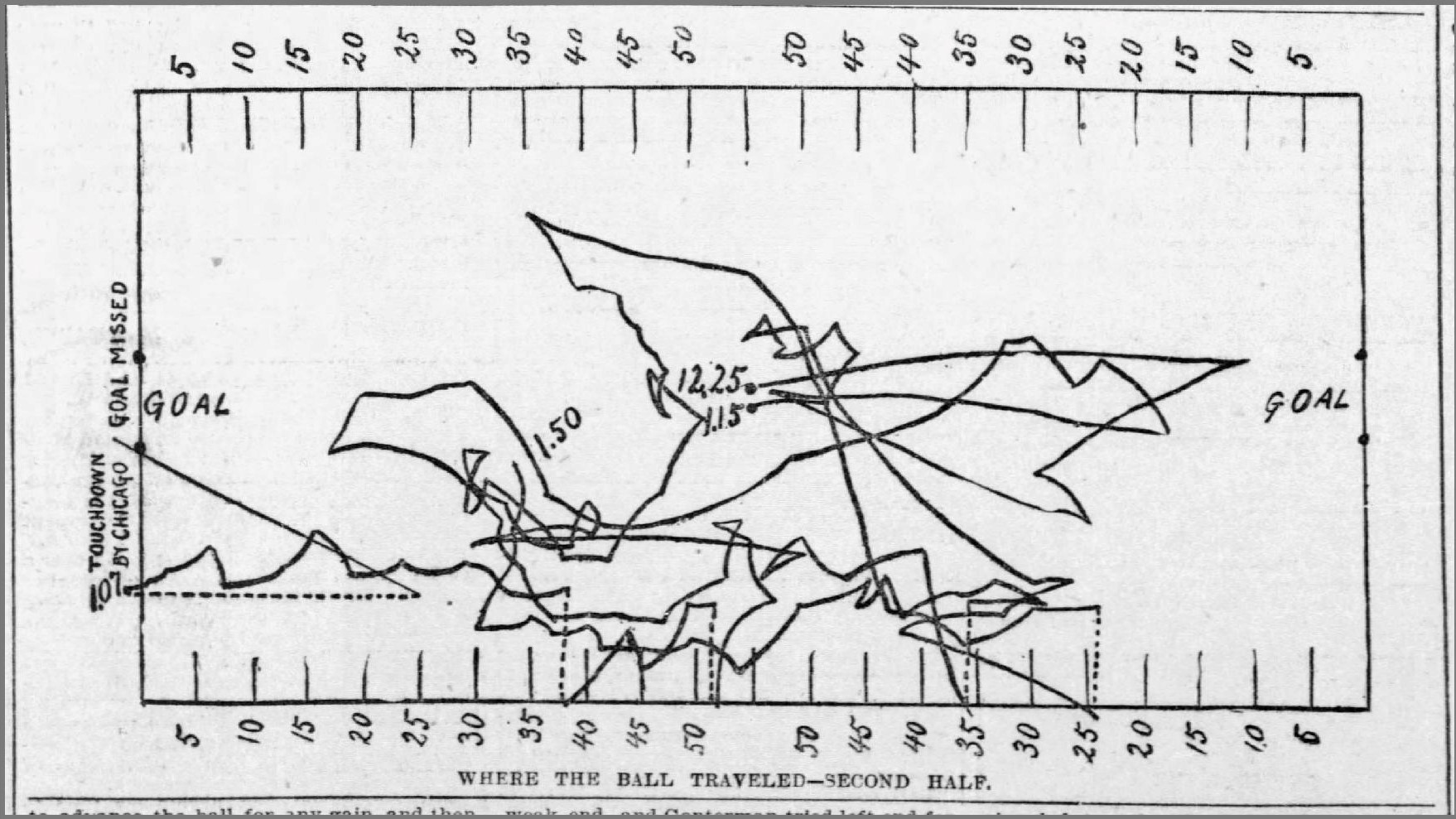
Where the ball traveled in the second half.

Heffelfinger broke through the weaker left side of BAA and made 5 yards with 3 men on his back. Richards was sent on the next play through the middle but was nailed by Bert Waters. Captain Stevenson was forced to call for a kick, and Brown sent the oval 25 yards down the field. It was a very low ball, and touched a number of CAA and BAA hands, before finally being recovered by Boston AA.

Boston AA could not find a weak point in the Chicago AA defensive line now that Heffelfinger was playing on the left, so the ball was turned over again.

Thompson, who had been out for a minor injury, came in to play the downs. Thomas was sent through the middle, but turned the ball over on a fumble.

Once again the men of Boston could not advance the football, and was sent back to CAA for another set of downs.

With the ball in the hands of Jesse Van Doozer, the Chicago AA sat back, and watched the Nebraska native wrap up 6 gains on downs, greatly helping to achieve their first, and only touchdown of the day. On the first attempt he made 2, and then a run of 8 yards, before a rare slip with no gain. On the next couple plays Van Doozer made his way slower down the field, with small gains of 2 to 4 yards per down. Richards was sent for 4 more yards, and then Brown went through the center for 7 yards. On the next play Van Doozer brought the ball all the way to the goal line, and on the play after Brown wrapped up the possession with a hard-fought touchdown. Chicago AA 4, Boston AA 4. The CAA crowd cheered with excitement, thinking they were about to win the brutal Thanksgiving Day contest, but Brown missed what was called a "sure goal", the score stood, tied 4 to 4.

Russell kicked the ball back to Chicago, and Thomas carried it 8 yards before being tackled by Bert Waters. On the next play the best run of the day would occur. Heffelfinger was given the ball, and making an opening between guard and tackle, dashed through, and ran 40 yards before a late tackle by Gonterman, who came from behind and saved the game for BAA. Another few short gains would occur, before another critical point of the contest was revealed. Heffelfinger took the ball and ran through the center, with nearly every player dog piling, while the ball rolled out and on to the sideline. Slater, who was one of the only men not in the push, did not see the ball at first, and if he had noticed it sooner, must likely would have scored the winning points of the day. But his sight was too late, and by the time he got to the ball, was tackled by a BAA defender. the tactic of bombarding the weak side of the line continued, with LeMoyne receiving an injury from the practice and sitting out the remainder of the game. Slater had just been given the ball when the final time was called, cementing the final score, 4 to 4.

Chicago AA had kept the ball almost entirely in BAA's side of the field during the 2nd half, just as BAA had done to Chicago AA in the 1st half. Both teams left disappointed, with Chicago AA sure they could have scored again had they been given more time. Many praised Van Doozer, Heffelfinger, Stevenson, Bert Waters, and Curtis for their excellent play, and the game was deemed very clean, with the sole blemish being the scuffle in the 1st half. CAA was also praised for their individual work, while BAA was credited with the better team work. After the game, the two teams went back to CAA headquarters, and enjoyed a long meal together, filled with congratulations from the coaches and captains on their spectacular seasons.

This would be the final game of Chicago Athletic Association's 1895 football season. They would finish the season 9–3–1 (or 10–3–1, counting the game against Swift & Co.). Boston Athletic Association would also conclude their football season, finishing with an undefeated (but certainly not unblemished) record of 6–0–4.

== Post-season ==
=== December ===
December 13- Harry S. Cornish tendered his resignation after three seasons with the Chicago Athletic Association. He had been Athletic manager since June 1, 1893, and was paid $2500 per year for his assistance with the team. His contract was not set to expire until May 31, 1896. There were rumors that he had accepted an offer from the upstart Manhattan Athletic Club, and if so, would have become his 3rd job as Athletic manager for an Athletic Club, working at the Boston Athletic Association as well from 1892 to 1893.

December 31- William Hale (Billy) Thompson was elected the new captain for next year's football team. He set out to help his team immediately, defending them from the professionalism claims of Caspar W. Whitney, a writer for a Chicago newspaper.

== Roster ==
There are a few things to note about the 1895 Chicago Athletic Association roster. One is that positions were not as set in stone as they are in the modern day, and no one on the team had the same position for the whole season (possibly with the exception of star center Archibald Stevenson, who only missed the exhibition against Swift & Co.). Furthermore, it was a rarity for a team member to play every game in the season, due to the moderate influx of new players every couple weeks and higher risk of injury from the game. Only Ben Thomas, a left tackle/guard, managed to play every game, and if you don't include the exhibition, that only adds Stevenson. There were several "regulars" though, those who played at least seven or more games in the season. Those players were Fred Slater, Paul Brown, Ben Thomas, CB Coffeen, DA Stone, Harry G. Hadden, Archibald Stevenson, JR Huddelson, Aldrich, and Olin McCormick. Notable members of this roster are Harry Hadden, who coached Notre Dame in 1895, Jesse Van Doozer, Northwestern's 1897 coach, and the infamous "Pudge" Heffelfinger, who played 4 years at Yale, was a three-time All American, and is credited as the first professional (paid) American football player.

=== Past playing experience ===
Most members of the team also had past playing experience at colleges, universities, local, and athletic (semi-pro) teams. Teams are listed chronologically when possible.

- William Fred Slater: 1890–1892 Illinois halfback, 1894 Chicago AA
- Lucas: 1894 Chicago AA
- Paul G. Brown: 2 years at Cornell as fullback, 1894 Chicago AA (2nd half)
- E. B. Camp: 1893 Penn
- Ben Thomas: 1894 Chicago AA, Northwestern
- Ralph T. Hoagland: 1894 Princeton quarterback (1st half of the season)
- C. B. Coffeen: 1892–1894 Virginia left halfback
- H. A. Parkyn: 1895 Minnesota fullback
- D. A. Stone: Oak Park and local YMCA
- R. Bartl: 4 years at Johnstown AC and the YMCA
- H. G. Hadden: 1894 Michigan tackle and end
- Atwood: Cornell
- Archibald Stevenson: 1889, 1891, and 1892 Purdue varsity tackle and center, Chicago AA
- W. H. Thompson: 1892 Chicago AA
- Henry (possibly Henry S. Graves): 1892 Yale
- Blaney: 1894 Washington & Jefferson captain
- Bill Aldrich: 3 years at Purdue, 1893 Purdue quarterback
- Olin McCormick: 1892–1893 Illinois right guard,
- Mulliken: Columbia, Crescent AC
- Pudge Heffelfinger: 1888–1891 Yale guard (3x Walter Camp All-American), 1892 Chicago AA and Allegheny AA
- Jesse Van Doozer: 1892–1893 Northwestern, 1894 Chicago AA, 1895 Northwestern

1895 Chicago Athletic Association Football Roster
| Quarterbacks: Bill Aldrich – Every game besides Swift, Chicago, and Illinois (5'8 or 11", 141.25 or 144 Lbs); (R. T.) Ralph Hougland – Rush Medical and Illinois (156 Lbs); Lucas – Swift (155 Lbs); Woods – Swift (140 Lbs); Henry – Chicago (153 Lbs); C. B. Coffeen – Indianapolis Artillery 1st time (5'7", 165 or 164 Lbs); Left ends: D. A. Stone – Every game besides Swift, Rush-Lake Forest, Indianapolis Artillery 2nd time, and Boston AA (6'3.5", 185 or 178 Lbs); E. B. Camp – Swift and Chicago (156 Lbs); Joseph R. Hudelson – Rush-Lake Forest (5'10", 164.5 Lbs); William Fred Slater – Indianapolis Artillery 2nd time and Boston AA (5'7" or 5.5", 155 or 142.5 Lbs); W. H. Thompson – Duquesne Country AC (5'10.75 or 11", 189, 194, or 180 Lbs); Left tackles: W. H. Thompson – Every game besides Swift, Rush-Lake Forest, YMCA and Duquesne Country AC (5'10.75 or 11", 189, 194, or 180 Lbs); Barter – YMCA and Duquesne Country AC; "Big" Ben Thomas – Swift, Rush-lake Forest, and Newton AC (5'10 or 11", 192 or 198 Lbs); Left guards: "Big" Ben Thomas – Every game besides Swift, Rush-Lake Forest, and Newton AC (5'11 or 10", 192, 198, or 210 Lbs); D. A. Stone – Chicago (6'3.5", 185 or 178 Lbs); Mulliken – Rush-Lake Forest and Newton AC; Logeman – Swift | Centers: Archibald Stevenson – Every game besides Swift (6'1 or 2", 202 or 200 Lbs); Barter – Swift; Right guards: Olin McCormick – Every game besides Swift, Chicago, Rush Medical, Indianapolis Artillery 1st time, Rush-Lake Forest and YMCA (6'0", 181 Lbs); R. Bartl – Chicago and Rush-Lake Forest; Harry G. Hadden – Indianapolis Artillery 1st time and Newton AC (6'0 or 1", 178, or 175.75 Lbs); Bernstein – Swift; Mulliken – YMCA; Ryan – Rush Medical; Right tackles: Harry G. Hadden – Every game besides Swift, Chicago, Indianapolis Artillery 1st and 2nd time, Rush-Lake Forest and Boston AA (6'0 or 1", 178, or 175.75 Lbs); Olin McCormick – Indianapolis 1st time and Rush-Lake Forest (6'0", 181 Lbs); R. Bartl – Newton AC; Cragin – Swift; Blaney – Chicago (5'9", 172 Lbs); "Pudge" William W. Heffelfinger – Boston AA (6'3 or 2", 195 Lbs); Ryan – Indianapolis 2nd time; Right ends: Joseph R. Hudelson – Every game besides Swift, Illinois and Rush-Lake Forest (5'10", 164.5 Lbs); Paul G. Brown – Rush Medical and Illinois (5'10 or 10.5", 157.5, 165, or 192 Lbs); Harry G. Hadden – Rush-Lake Forest (6'0 or 1", 178, or 175.75 Lbs); Atwood – Swift (165 Lbs) | Left halfbacks: William Fred Slater – Every game besides Swift, Chicago, Rush Medical, Rush-Lake Forest, Indianapolis Artillery 2nd time, and Boston AA (5'7" or 5.5", 155 or 142.5 Lbs); C. B. Coffeen – Rush-Lake Forest, Newton AC, MIT and Indianapolis Artillery 2nd time (5'7", 165 or 164 Lbs); (R. T.) Ralph Hougland – Swift and Chicago (156 Lbs); Richards – Boston AA (5'11", 175 Lbs); Right halfbacks: Blaney – Rush-Lake Forest, Newton AC, Penn, Orange AC, Duquesne Country AC and Indianapolis Artillery 2nd time (5'9", 172 Lbs); C. B. Coffeen – Swift, Penn, and YMCA (5'7", 165 or 164 Lbs); William Fred Slater – Chicago and MIT (5'7" or 5.5", 155 or 142.5 Lbs); E. B. Camp – Illinois and Indianapolis Artillery 1st time (156 Lbs); Jesse Van Doozer – Boston AA; Fullbacks: Paul G. Brown – Every game besides YMCA and Indianapolis Artillery 2nd time (5'10 or 10.5", 157.5, 165, or 192 Lbs); H. A. Parkyn – Rush Medical and Illinois (190 Lbs); (R. T.) Ralph Hougland – Indianapolis Artillery 2nd time (156 Lbs); Blaney – Orange AC (5'9", 172 Lbs) |
