= 1895 Elmira Athletic Club football team =

American football team season

1895 Elmira Athletic Club football
- Conference: Independent
- Record: 6–2

1895 Athletic Club football records
| | Conf. | | | Overall |
| Team | W | L | T | W | | L | | T |
|---|---|---|---|---|---|---|---|---|
| Entre Nous AA | | – | | 9 | – | 1 | – | 0 |
| Pittsburgh AC | | – | | 7 | – | 1 | – | 2 |
| Crescent AC | | – | | 8 | – | 2 | – | 1 |
| Greensburg AA | | – | | 8 | – | 2 | – | 1 |
| Chicago AA | | – | | 10 | – | 3 | – | 1 |
| Elmira AC | | – | | 6 | – | 2 | – | 0 |
| Illinois CC | | – | | 6 | – | 2 | – | 0 |
| New Jersey AC | | – | | 5 | – | 3 | – | 0 |
| Orange AC | | – | | 6 | – | 4 | – | 1 |
| Duquesne CAC | | – | | 4 | – | 3 | – | 1 |
| Noblesville AC | | – | | 3 | – | 3 | – | 2 |
| Newton AA | | – | | 4 | – | 4 | – | 1 |
| Louisville AC | | – | | 2 | – | 4 | – | 0 |
| Hyde Park AA | | – | | 0 | – | 3 | – | 2 |
| Syracuse AA | | – | | 1 | – | 5 | – | 0 |

The 1895 Elmira Athletic Club football team was an American football team that represented the Elmira Athletic Club of New York as an independent during the 1895 football season. The team compiled a 6–2 record, shut out three opponents, and outscored their opponents by a total of 85 to 46.

== Schedule ==
| Date | Opponent | Site | Result | Source |
|---|---|---|---|---|
| October 2 | Scranton Bicycle Club (PA) | Elmira, NY | W 2–0 | |
| October 12 | Saint John's Military Academy (NY) | | W 12–0 | |
| October 18 | Saint John's Military Academy (NY) | | W 18–0 | |
| | Cornell B team | | W 26–20 | |
| | Athens Athletic Club | | W 10–6 | |
| November 9 | Orange Athletic Club | Orange Oval; Orange, NJ | L 0–6 | |
| November 20 | at Scranton Bicycle Club (PA) | Baseball Park; Scranton, PA | L 2–10 | |
| | Hobart (NY) | | W 15–4 | |
