= 1895 Syracuse Athletic Association football team =

American football team season

1895 Syracuse Athletic Association football
- Conference: Independent
- Record: 1–5

1895 Athletic Club football records
	Conf.			Overall
Team	W	L	T	W		L		T
Entre Nous AA		–		9	–	1	–	0
Pittsburgh AC		–		7	–	1	–	2
Crescent AC		–		8	–	2	–	1
Greensburg AA		–		8	–	2	–	1
Chicago AA		–		10	–	3	–	1
Elmira AC		–		6	–	2	–	0
Illinois CC		–		6	–	2	–	0
New Jersey AC		–		5	–	3	–	0
Orange AC		–		6	–	4	–	1
Duquesne CAC		–		4	–	3	–	1
Noblesville AC		–		3	–	3	–	2
Newton AA		–		4	–	4	–	1
Louisville AC		–		2	–	4	–	0
Hyde Park AA		–		0	–	3	–	2
Syracuse AA		–		1	–	5	–	0

The 1895 Syracuse Athletic Association football team was an American football team that represented the Syracuse Athletic Association as an independent during the 1895 football season. The team compiled a 1–5 record and was outscored by its opponents by a total of 116 to 22.

== Schedule ==
Date	Time	Opponent	Site	Result	Source
October 5		Hamilton		W 18–0	
October 10		Syracuse	Syracuse, NY	L 0–24	
October 12	3:30 p.m.	at Orange Athletic Club	Orange Oval; Orange, NJ	L 0–24	
November 2		Union (NY)		L 0–36	
November 13		Syracuse	Syracuse, NY	L 0–18	
November 14		Colgate	Syracuse, NY	L 4–14	
