= 1895 Crescent Athletic Club football team =

American football team season

1895 Crescent Athletic Club football

AFU champion
- Conference: American Football Union
- Record: 8–2–1 (4–0 AFU)
- Captain: W. D. Hotchkiss
- Home stadium: Eastern Park

1895 Athletic Club football records
	Conf.			Overall
Team	W	L	T	W		L		T
Entre Nous AA		–		9	–	1	–	0
Pittsburgh AC		–		7	–	1	–	2
Crescent AC		–		8	–	2	–	1
Greensburg AA		–		8	–	2	–	1
Chicago AA		–		10	–	3	–	1
Elmira AC		–		6	–	2	–	0
Illinois CC		–		6	–	2	–	0
New Jersey AC		–		5	–	3	–	0
Orange AC		–		6	–	4	–	1
Duquesne CAC		–		4	–	3	–	1
Noblesville AC		–		3	–	3	–	2
Newton AA		–		4	–	4	–	1
Louisville AC		–		2	–	4	–	0
Hyde Park AA		–		0	–	3	–	2
Syracuse AA		–		1	–	5	–	0

The 1895 Crescent Athletic Club football team was an American football team that represented the Crescent Athletic Club in the American Football Union (AFU) during the 1895 college football season. The team played its home games at Eastern Park in Brooklyn and compiled an 8–2–1 record and claimed the AFU championship.

Crescent was scheduled to play the Orange Athletic Club for the AFU championship on November 16, but Orange objected to Phil King playing for the Crescents on grounds that he had previously been paid to coach for Princeton and was therefore not an amateur. The Crescents denied the Orange contention that King was disqualified under the AFU rules. The Orange club scheduled a game with Yale on the day that had been set with the Crescents. On the date set for the game, the Crescents appeared on the field without an opponent, ran one play for a touchdown, and claimed a disputed UFA championship.

W. D. Hotchkiss, a former player at Williams College, was the team captain and played at the center position. Other key players included Phil King and Harry Beecher at quarterback, Juan Smith at halfback, and Billy Ohl at fullback.

During the season, most of the players lived at the Crescent Athletic Club's clubhouse and ate at the clubhouse's training table. The new clubhouse opened in mid-October 1985. It was a four-story building with reading and smoking rooms, grill room, and offices on the first floor; card, chess and billiard rooms on the second floor; dining rooms on the third floor; and gymnasium with domed ceiling on the fourth floor.

== Schedule ==
Date	Time	Opponent	Site	Result	Attendance	Source
September 28		Elizabeth Athletic Club	Eastern Park; Brooklyn, NY	W 14–0		
October 5		New York YMCA*	Eastern Park; Brooklyn, NY	W 28–4		
October 9		Penn	Eastern Park; Brooklyn, NY	L 0–32	< 500	
October 12		Yale*	Eastern Park; Brooklyn, NY	L 2–8		
October 19	4:00 p.m.	Amherst*	Eastern Park; Brooklyn, NY	W 20–0	1,000	
October 26		Williams*	Eastern Park; Brooklyn, NY	W 43–0	2,000	
November 2		New Jersey Athletic Club	Eastern Park; Brooklyn, NY	W 28–0		
November 5	3:20 p.m.	Brown*	Eastern Park; Brooklyn, NY	W 16–0		
November 9		Boston Athletic Association*	Eastern Park; Brooklyn, NY	T 0–0	2,000	
November 16		Orange Athletic Club	Eastern Park; Brooklyn, NY	W 4–0 (disputed forfeit)		
November 16		Elizabeth Athletic Club	Eastern Park; Brooklyn, NY	W 14–0		
*Non-conference game
