= 1895 Noblesville Athletic Club football team =

American military football team

1895 Noblesville Athletic Club football
- Conference: Independent
- Record: 3–3–2
- Head coach: Shubert Vestal (1st season)
- Captains: Darrah (fullback); Norton (quarterback)

1895 Athletic Club football records
	Conf.			Overall
Team	W	L	T	W		L		T
Entre Nous AA		–		9	–	1	–	0
Pittsburgh AC		–		7	–	1	–	2
Crescent AC		–		8	–	2	–	1
Greensburg AA		–		8	–	2	–	1
Chicago AA		–		10	–	3	–	1
Elmira AC		–		6	–	2	–	0
Illinois CC		–		6	–	2	–	0
New Jersey AC		–		5	–	3	–	0
Orange AC		–		6	–	4	–	1
Duquesne CAC		–		4	–	3	–	1
Noblesville AC		–		3	–	3	–	2
Newton AA		–		4	–	4	–	1
Louisville AC		–		2	–	4	–	0
Hyde Park AA		–		0	–	3	–	2
Syracuse AA		–		1	–	5	–	0

The 1895 Noblesville Athletic Club football team was an American football team that represented the Noblesville Athletic Club of Indiana in the 1895 college football season. Under coach and team manager Shubert Vestal, who played for Noblesville in 1894 as quarterback, the Athletic Club compiled a 3–3–2 record.

== Schedule ==
Date	Time	Opponent	Site	Result	Attendance	Source
October 7		Butler	Noblesville, IN	T 0–0	400	
October 12	2:35 p.m.	at Wabash	Crawfordsville, IN	L 4–6		
October 19		Kokomo	Noblesville, IN	W 30–0		
November 2		at Indianapolis Light Artillery	Indianapolis, IN	L 4–22		
		Indiana		L 0–30		
		Fountain Square		W		
November		Edinburg	Noblesville, IN	T 4–4		
November 28		Pastime Athletic Club	Noblesville, IN	W 0–30		
