= 1895 Newton Athletic Association football team =

American football team season

1895 Newton Athletic Association football
- Conference: Independent
- Record: 4–4–1
- Captains: Brown (fullback); Arthur P. Teel (left guard); Nichols (halfback)
- Home stadium: N.A.A. Field at Newton Centre

1895 Athletic Club football records
	Conf.			Overall
Team	W	L	T	W		L		T
Entre Nous AA		–		9	–	1	–	0
Pittsburgh AC		–		7	–	1	–	2
Crescent AC		–		8	–	2	–	1
Greensburg AA		–		8	–	2	–	1
Chicago AA		–		10	–	3	–	1
Elmira AC		–		6	–	2	–	0
Illinois CC		–		6	–	2	–	0
New Jersey AC		–		5	–	3	–	0
Orange AC		–		6	–	4	–	1
Duquesne CAC		–		4	–	3	–	1
Noblesville AC		–		3	–	3	–	2
Newton AA		–		4	–	4	–	1
Louisville AC		–		2	–	4	–	0
Hyde Park AA		–		0	–	3	–	2
Syracuse AA		–		1	–	5	–	0

The 1895 Newton Athletic Association football team represented the Newton Athletic Association of Newton, Massachusetts during the 1895 college football season. Under the leadership of various elected captains throughout the season, the Athletics compiled at least a 4–4–1 record, and outscored their opponents by a total of 76 to 46.

During the season, Newton AA and Hyde Park AA played a three-game series for the honor of silver cup that was bestowed upon the champion of the "suburban league", which had apparently disbanded the year prior, and needed to resolve the question of who would keep the silver trophy indefinitely. The cup would be given to whichever team managed to win two or more of the contests, which would turn out to be the NAA, compiling a 2–0–1 record against the fellow athletic association.

== Schedule ==
Date	Time	Opponent	Site	Result	Attendance	Source
September 28		Brown	Lincoln Field; Providence, RI	L 0–22		
October 5		Boston Athletic Association	NAA Field; Newton, MA	L 4–10	1,000	
October 12	3:30 p.m.	Fitchburg	NAA Field; Newton, MA	W 18–0		
October 16		Tufts	Athletic Field at College Hill; Medford, MA	L 0–6	400	
October 19		Worcester Polytechnic	Cedar Street Oval; Newton, MA	W 12–0		
October 26		Chicago Athletic Association	NAA Field; Newton, MA	L 0–6	2,800	
November 9		Hyde Park Athletic Association	NAA Field; Newton, MA	T 0–0		
November 16		Hyde Park Athletic Association	NAA Field; Newton, MA	W 12–0	700	
November 20		Boston Athletic Association		Cancelled		
November		Cappello Athletic Club		Unknown		
November 28	10:00 a.m.	Hyde Park Athletic Association	Cedar Street Oval; Newton, MA	W 30–2	1,500	

== Second team schedule ==
Date	Opponent	Site	Result	Source
September 21	Newton Athletic Association (1st team)	NAA Field; Newton, MA	Unknown	
October 19	English High School	Cedar Street Oval; Newton, MA	L 0–10	
October 26	Cappello Athletic Club	NAA Field; Newton, MA	Cancelled	
