= 1895 Orange Athletic Club football team =

American football team season

1895 Orange Athletic Club football
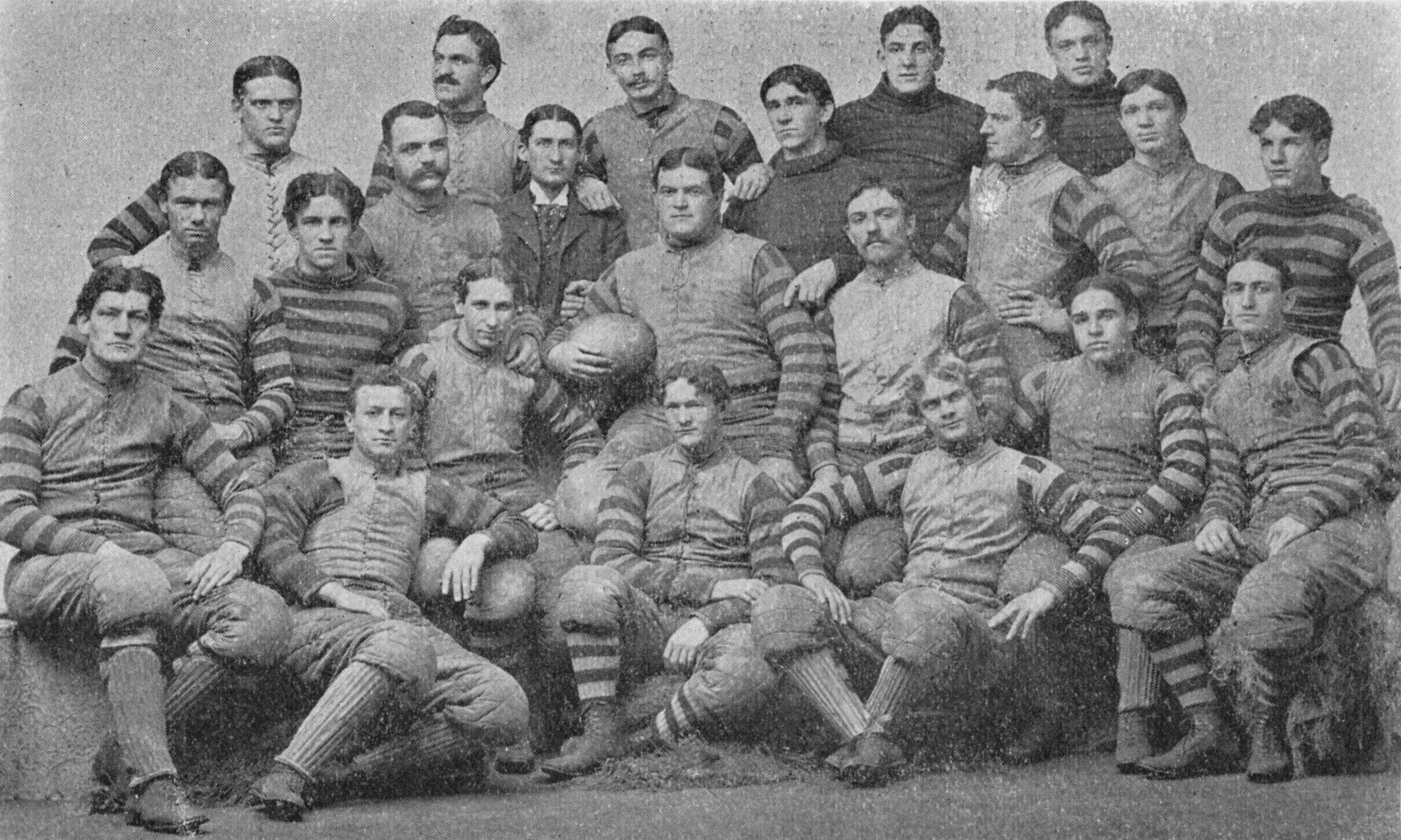
- Conference: American Football Union
- Record: 6–4–1 (1–1 AFU)
- Head coach: Frederick R. M. Knowles (elected manager) (1st season)
- Captains: Oliver; Hutchinson
- Home stadium: Orange Oval

1895 Athletic Club football records
| | Conf. | | | Overall |
| Team | W | L | T | W | | L | | T |
|---|---|---|---|---|---|---|---|---|
| Entre Nous AA | | – | | 9 | – | 1 | – | 0 |
| Pittsburgh AC | | – | | 7 | – | 1 | – | 2 |
| Crescent AC | | – | | 8 | – | 2 | – | 1 |
| Greensburg AA | | – | | 8 | – | 2 | – | 1 |
| Chicago AA | | – | | 10 | – | 3 | – | 1 |
| Elmira AC | | – | | 6 | – | 2 | – | 0 |
| Illinois CC | | – | | 6 | – | 2 | – | 0 |
| New Jersey AC | | – | | 5 | – | 3 | – | 0 |
| Orange AC | | – | | 6 | – | 4 | – | 1 |
| Duquesne CAC | | – | | 4 | – | 3 | – | 1 |
| Noblesville AC | | – | | 3 | – | 3 | – | 2 |
| Newton AA | | – | | 4 | – | 4 | – | 1 |
| Louisville AC | | – | | 2 | – | 4 | – | 0 |
| Hyde Park AA | | – | | 0 | – | 3 | – | 2 |
| Syracuse AA | | – | | 1 | – | 5 | – | 0 |

The 1895 Orange Athletic Club football team was an American football team that represented the Orange Athletic Club in the American Football Union (AFU) during the 1895 college football season. The team played its home games at the Orange Oval in East Orange, New Jersey, compiled a 6–4–1 record (1–1 against AFU opponents), and shut out six opponents.

== Schedule ==
| Date | Time | Opponent | Site | Result | Attendance | Source |
|---|---|---|---|---|---|---|
| October 5 | | Lafayette* | Orange Oval; Orange, NJ | L 0–12 | 1,500 | |
| October 12 | 3:30 p.m. | Syracuse Athletic Association* | Orange Oval; Orange, NJ | W 24–0 | | |
| October 19 | 3:30 p.m. | Yale* | Orange Oval; Orange, NJ | L 12–24 | 6,000 | |
| October 23 | | Orange YMCA* | Orange Oval; Orange, NJ | W 24–0 | | |
| October 26 | 3:30 p.m. | Princeton* | Orange Oval; Orange, NJ | T 0–0 | 5,000 | |
| November 2 | | Lehigh* | Orange Oval; Orange, NJ | W 2–0 | | |
| November 5 | | Chicago Athletic Association* | Orange Oval; Orange, NJ | W 24–0 | 9,000 | |
| November 9 | | at Navy* | Annapolis, MD | W 10–6 | | |
| November 16 | 3:30 p.m. | vs. Crescent Athletic Club | Eastern Park; Brooklyn, NY | L (forfeit) | | |
| November 16 | 3:15 p.m. | vs. Yale* | Manhattan Field; Manhattan, NY | L 0–26 | 3,500 | |
| November 28 | 3:00 p.m. | Elizabeth Athletic Club | Orange Oval; Orange, NJ | W 10–0 | | |
*Non-conference game

== Second team schedule ==
| Date | Opponent | Site | Result | Source |
|---|---|---|---|---|
| November 9 | Elmira Athletic Club | Orange Oval; Orange, NJ | W 6–0 | |

== Consolidated team schedule ==
| Date | Opponent | Site | Result | Source |
|---|---|---|---|---|
| December | Entre Nous Club | Paterson, NJ | L 0–10 | |
