= 1895 Louisville Athletic Club football team =

American football team season

1895 Louisville Athletic Club football
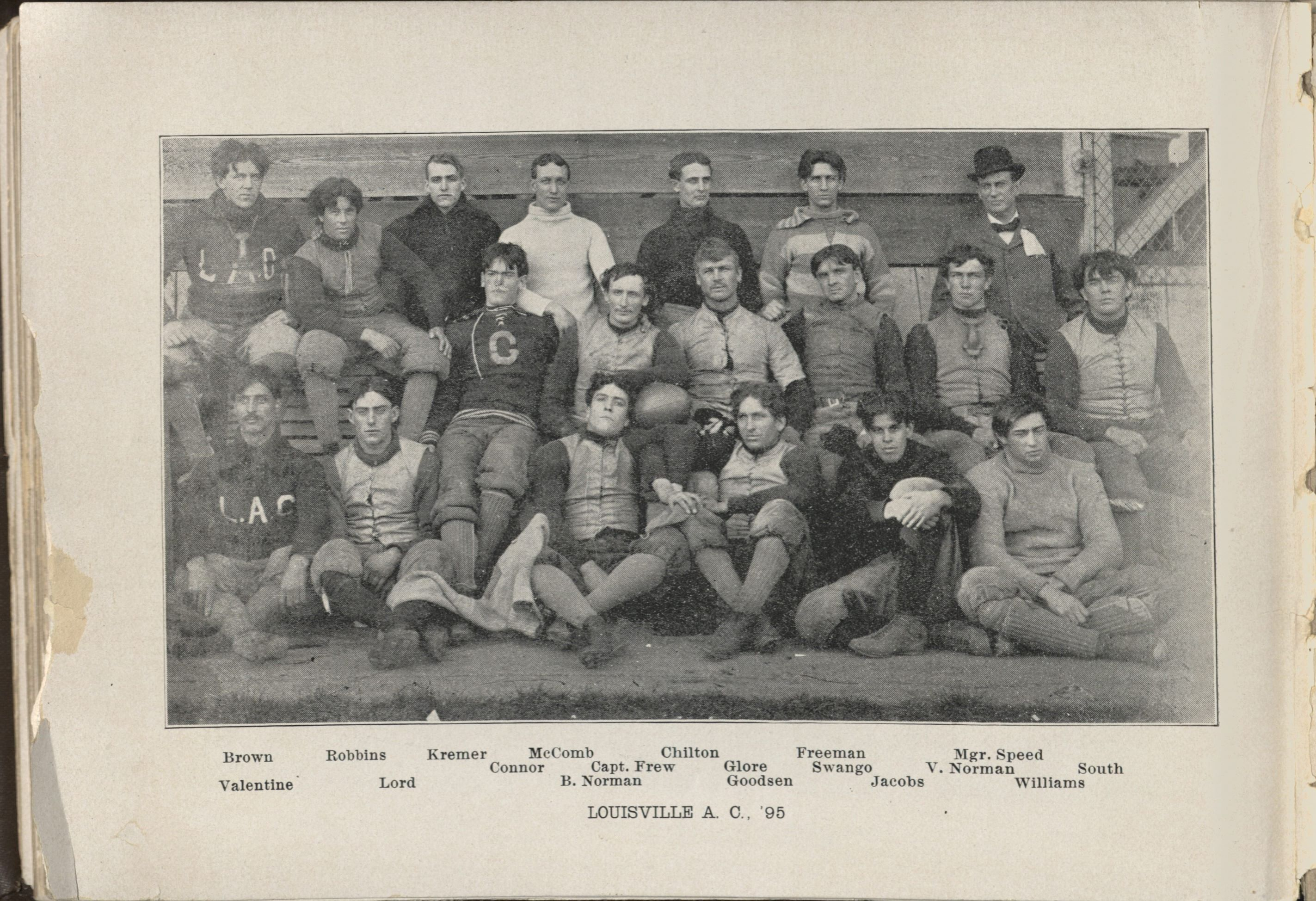
- Conference: Independent
- Record: 2–4
- Head coach: Frew (1st season)
- Captain: Frew (halfback)
- Home stadium: New Ball Park

1895 Athletic Club football records
	Conf.			Overall
Team	W	L	T	W		L		T
Entre Nous AA		–		9	–	1	–	0
Pittsburgh AC		–		7	–	1	–	2
Crescent AC		–		8	–	2	–	1
Greensburg AA		–		8	–	2	–	1
Chicago AA		–		10	–	3	–	1
Elmira AC		–		6	–	2	–	0
Illinois CC		–		6	–	2	–	0
New Jersey AC		–		5	–	3	–	0
Orange AC		–		6	–	4	–	1
Duquesne CAC		–		4	–	3	–	1
Noblesville AC		–		3	–	3	–	2
Newton AA		–		4	–	4	–	1
Louisville AC		–		2	–	4	–	0
Hyde Park AA		–		0	–	3	–	2
Syracuse AA		–		1	–	5	–	0

The 1895 Louisville Athletic Club football team was an American club football team that represented the Louisville Athletic Club during the 1895 college football season. Under Coach Frew, who also played halfback, the team compiled a 2–4 record, and was outscored by their opponents by a total of 92 to 70.

== Schedule ==
Date	Time	Opponent	Site	Result	Attendance	Source
October 12	3:45 p.m.	Indiana	New Ball Park?; Louisville, KY	L 0–36	500	
November 2		Central (KY)		W 36–0		
November 9		Centre	New Ball Park?; Louisville, KY	L 0–10		
November 16	3:00 p.m.	Indianapolis Light Artillery	New Ball Park; Louisville, KY	L 12–20	~800	
November 23		at Kentucky	Lexington, KY	L 10–16		
November 28	2:30 p.m.	DePauw	New Ball Bark; Louisville, KY	W 12–10		
All times are in Eastern time
