= 1895 New Jersey Athletic Club football team =

American football team season

1895 New Jersey Athletic Club football
- Conference: Independent
- Record: 5–3
- Home stadium: New Jersey Oval?

1895 Athletic Club football records
| | Conf. | | | Overall |
| Team | W | L | T | W | | L | | T |
|---|---|---|---|---|---|---|---|---|
| Entre Nous AA | | – | | 9 | – | 1 | – | 0 |
| Pittsburgh AC | | – | | 7 | – | 1 | – | 2 |
| Crescent AC | | – | | 8 | – | 2 | – | 1 |
| Greensburg AA | | – | | 8 | – | 2 | – | 1 |
| Chicago AA | | – | | 10 | – | 3 | – | 1 |
| Elmira AC | | – | | 6 | – | 2 | – | 0 |
| Illinois CC | | – | | 6 | – | 2 | – | 0 |
| New Jersey AC | | – | | 5 | – | 3 | – | 0 |
| Orange AC | | – | | 6 | – | 4 | – | 1 |
| Duquesne CAC | | – | | 4 | – | 3 | – | 1 |
| Noblesville AC | | – | | 3 | – | 3 | – | 2 |
| Newton AA | | – | | 4 | – | 4 | – | 1 |
| Louisville AC | | – | | 2 | – | 4 | – | 0 |
| Hyde Park AA | | – | | 0 | – | 3 | – | 2 |
| Syracuse AA | | – | | 1 | – | 5 | – | 0 |

The 1895 New Jersey Athletic Club football team was an American football team that represented the New Jersey Athletic Club as an independent during the 1895 football season. The team shut out four of its opponents, compiled a 5–3 record, and outscored their opponents by a total of 131 to 72.

== Schedule ==
| Date | Opponent | Site | Result |
|---|---|---|---|
| October 5 | General Theological Seminary (NY) | | W 66–0 |
| October 12 | at Navy | Worden Field; Annapolis, MD | L 0–34 |
| October 19 | Hackettstown Cycling Club | New Jersey Oval; Bergen Point, NJ | W 22–0 |
| October 26 | at Wesleyan (CT) | Andrus Field; Middletown, CT | L 0–18 |
| November 5 | Trinity (CT) | | L 0–16 |
| November 9 | Naval Reserve Pier | | W 11–4 |
| November 28 | at Pennington Seminary | Bayonne, NJ | W 20–0 |
| November 28 | at NYU | New York City, NY | W 12–0 |
