= 1895 Hyde Park Athletic Association football team =

American football team season

1895 Hyde Park Athletic Association football
- Conference: Independent
- Record: 0–3–2
- Captain: House (halfback)
- Home stadium: Hyde Park A. A. Field

1895 Athletic Club football records
	Conf.			Overall
Team	W	L	T	W		L		T
Entre Nous AA		–		9	–	1	–	0
Pittsburgh AC		–		7	–	1	–	2
Crescent AC		–		8	–	2	–	1
Greensburg AA		–		8	–	2	–	1
Chicago AA		–		10	–	3	–	1
Elmira AC		–		6	–	2	–	0
Illinois CC		–		6	–	2	–	0
New Jersey AC		–		5	–	3	–	0
Orange AC		–		6	–	4	–	1
Duquesne CAC		–		4	–	3	–	1
Noblesville AC		–		3	–	3	–	2
Newton AA		–		4	–	4	–	1
Louisville AC		–		2	–	4	–	0
Hyde Park AA		–		0	–	3	–	2
Syracuse AA		–		1	–	5	–	0

The 1895 Hyde Park Athletic Association football team represented the Hyde Park Athletic Association of Hyde Park, Boston, during the 1895 college football season. The Athletics compiled a 0–3–2 record, a low point for the team after winning the suburban league championship the last two years, and were outscored 78 to 8. They would lose their silver cup to Newton Athletic Association in a three-game championship series.

During the season, Hyde Park AA and Newton AA played a three-game series for the honor of a silver cup that was bestowed upon the champion of the "suburban league", which had apparently disbanded the year prior, and needed to resolve the question of who would keep the silver trophy indefinitely. The cup would be given to whichever team managed to win two or more of the contests, which would turn out to be the NAA, compiling a 2–0–1 record against Hyde Park.

== Schedule ==
Date	Time	Opponent	Site	Result	Attendance	Source
October 19		at Campello Athletic Club	Brockton, MA	L 0–30	800	
October 26		Boston College	Stony Brook Grounds; Boston, MA	T 6–6		
November 9		at Newton Athletic Association	NAA Field; Newton, MA	T 0–0		
November 16	3:00 p.m.	at Newton Athletic Association	NAA Field; Newton, MA	L 0–12	700	
November 28	10:00 a.m.	at Newton Athletic Association	Cedar Street Oval; Newton, MA	L 2–30	1,500	
