= 1895 Entre Nous Athletic Association football team =

American football team season

1895 Entre Nous Athletic Association football
- Conference: Independent
- Record: 9–1
- Home stadium: Willard Park?

1895 Athletic Club football records
	Conf.			Overall
Team	W	L	T	W		L		T
Entre Nous AA		–		9	–	1	–	0
Pittsburgh AC		–		7	–	1	–	2
Crescent AC		–		8	–	2	–	1
Greensburg AA		–		8	–	2	–	1
Chicago AA		–		10	–	3	–	1
Elmira AC		–		6	–	2	–	0
Illinois CC		–		6	–	2	–	0
New Jersey AC		–		5	–	3	–	0
Orange AC		–		6	–	4	–	1
Duquesne CAC		–		4	–	3	–	1
Noblesville AC		–		3	–	3	–	2
Newton AA		–		4	–	4	–	1
Louisville AC		–		2	–	4	–	0
Hyde Park AA		–		0	–	3	–	2
Syracuse AA		–		1	–	5	–	0

The 1895 Entre Nous Athletic Association football team was an American football team that represented the Entre Nous Club of Paterson, New Jersey, as an independent during the 1895 college football season. The team shut out nine of their ten opponents and compiled a 9–1 record, losing only to the Consolidated team of Princeton University. They outscored their opponents by a total of 328 to 12.

== Schedule ==
Date	Opponent	Site	Result
	Willet's Point Engineers		W 12–0
	Dominican		W 42–0
	Governors Island		W 72–0
	Manhattan	Manhattan, NY	W 30–0
October 28	Bay Ridge Athletic Club		W 62–0
November 10	Yonkers Athletic Club	Willard Park; Paterson, NJ	W 40–0
	Willet's Point Engineers		W 18–0
November 28	Consolidated team of Princeton	Paterson, NJ	L 0–12
	Saint Peter's (NJ)		W 34–0
December	Consolidated team of Orange Athletic Club	Paterson, NJ	W 16–0
