= 1895 Illinois Cycling Club football team =

American football team season

1895 Illinois Cycling Club football
- Conference: Independent
- Record: 6–2
- Head coach: William C. Malley (1st season)
- Captain: Murphy (fullback)

1895 Athletic Club football records
	Conf.			Overall
Team	W	L	T	W		L		T
Entre Nous AA		–		9	–	1	–	0
Pittsburgh AC		–		7	–	1	–	2
Crescent AC		–		8	–	2	–	1
Greensburg AA		–		8	–	2	–	1
Chicago AA		–		10	–	3	–	1
Elmira AC		–		6	–	2	–	0
Illinois CC		–		6	–	2	–	0
New Jersey AC		–		5	–	3	–	0
Orange AC		–		6	–	4	–	1
Duquesne CAC		–		4	–	3	–	1
Noblesville AC		–		3	–	3	–	2
Newton AA		–		4	–	4	–	1
Louisville AC		–		2	–	4	–	0
Hyde Park AA		–		0	–	3	–	2
Syracuse AA		–		1	–	5	–	0

The 1895 Illinois Cycling Club football team was an American football team that represented the Illinois Cycling Club in the 1895 college football season. The Illinois Cycling Club played the Cycling Club from Lake View for the "Chicago Cycling Club Championship" on Thanksgiving Day. The prize was a white rooster that had been traded by the two teams since at least the year prior. In 1894, Illinois Cycling Club defeated the Lake View Cycling Club to take possession of this rooster, which became their team mascot. Lake View CC was undefeated coming into the contest, but fell to the Illinois cyclists 0 to 16 in front of a Thanksgiving crowd of 2,000, which was exactly the same as the final score for the 1894 contest. After the game, Lake View asserted that the game would not count to determine the championship, as the field was snowy and small. Illinois agreed, and the championship was split between the two teams.

== Schedule ==
Date	Time	Opponent	Site	Result	Attendance	Source
October 5		Austin Athletic Club	Austin, IL	W 18–0		
October 12		Riverside Athletic Club	Riverside, IL	W 16–6		
October 19	3:30 p.m.	Rush–Lake Forest	Douglas Park; Chicago, IL	L 6–10		
		Chicago Physicians and Surgeons		W 18–0		
November 2		Palatine Athletic Club	Palantine, IL	W 32–0		
November 7		Notre Dame	Brownson Hall field; Notre Dame, IN	L 2–18		
November 9		Proviso Giants	Maywood, IL	W 34–0		
November 28	10:00 a.m.	Lake View Cycling Club	Northwest City League Ball Park; Chicago, IL (Chicago Cycling Club Championship)	W 16–0	2,000	

== Second team schedule ==
The Cycling Club's second team played one game, against the secondary from Irving Park on Thanksgiving.

Date	Opponent	Site	Result	Source
November 28	Irving Park Athletic Club	Chicago, IL		
