= 1895 Greensburg Athletic Association football season =

American football team season

1895 Greensburg Athletic Association football
- Record: 8–2–1
- Manager: J. E. Mitinger
- Head coach: Charlie Atherton
- Captain: Charlie Atherton
- Home field: Athletic Park

1895 Athletic Club football records
	Conf.			Overall
Team	W	L	T	W		L		T
Entre Nous AA		–		9	–	1	–	0
Pittsburgh AC		–		7	–	1	–	2
Crescent AC		–		8	–	2	–	1
Greensburg AA		–		8	–	2	–	1
Chicago AA		–		10	–	3	–	1
Elmira AC		–		6	–	2	–	0
Illinois CC		–		6	–	2	–	0
New Jersey AC		–		5	–	3	–	0
Orange AC		–		6	–	4	–	1
Duquesne CAC		–		4	–	3	–	1
Noblesville AC		–		3	–	3	–	2
Newton AA		–		4	–	4	–	1
Louisville AC		–		2	–	4	–	0
Hyde Park AA		–		0	–	3	–	2
Syracuse AA		–		1	–	5	–	0

The 1895 Greensburg Athletic Association season was their sixth season in existence. The team finished 8–2–1.

== Schedule ==
Game	Date	Opponent	Result
1	October 5	Latrobe Athletic Association	W 25–0
2	October 12	Western University of Pennsylvania	W 42–2
3	October 19	Altoona Athletic Club	W 12–6
4	October 26	Carnegie Athletic Club of Braddock	W 44–0
5	November 2	Wheeling Tigers	W 12–0
6	November 5	Connellsville, Pennsylvania	W 40–0
7	November 9	at Pittsburgh Athletic Club	T 0–0
8	November 16	at Duquesne Country and Athletic Club	L 0–12
9	November 23	at Altoona Athletic Club	W 17–4
10	November 28	Beaver Falls Y.M.C.A. (Note: Thanksgiving Day game)	W 24–0
11	November 30	at Latrobe Athletic Association	L 0–4
