= 1895 Pittsburgh Athletic Club football season =

American football team season

1895 Pittsburgh Athletic Club football
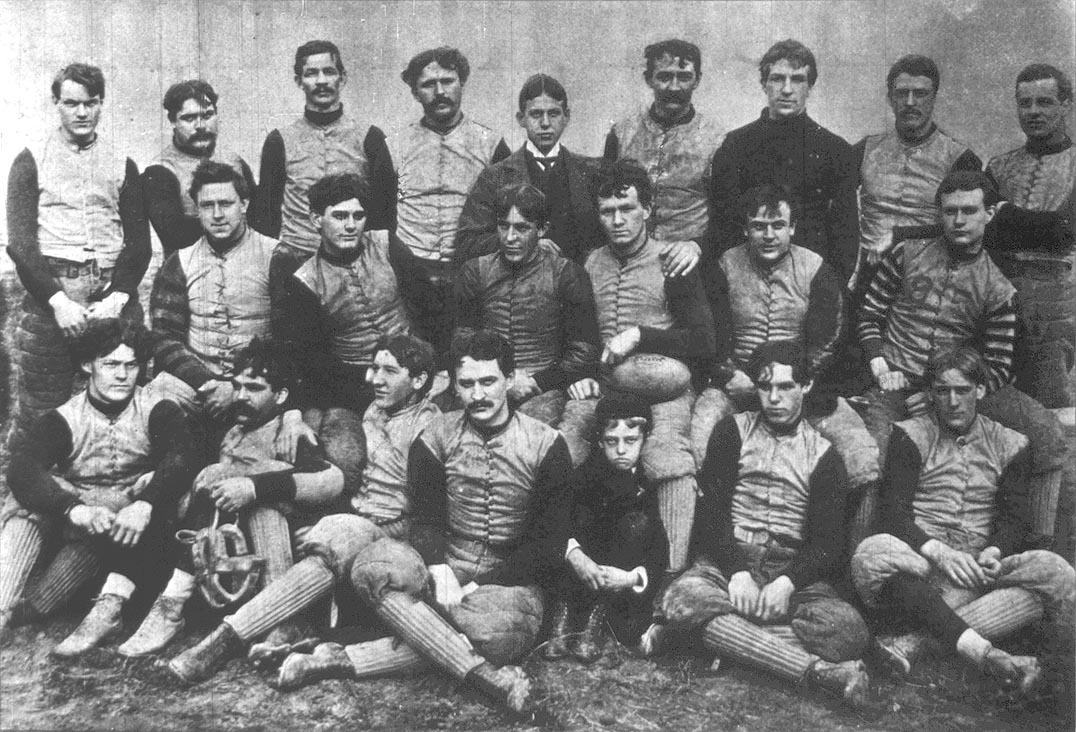
- Record: 7–1–2
- Chairman: Paul Myler
- Manager: Paul Myler
- Head coach: Harmon S. Graves (Note: The PAC went without a coach until Graves arrived in late November with only one game remaining. Graves had previously been coaching Army.)
- Captain: Tommy Roderick
- Home field: PAC Park

1895 Athletic Club football records
	Conf.			Overall
Team	W	L	T	W		L		T
Entre Nous AA		–		9	–	1	–	0
Pittsburgh AC		–		7	–	1	–	2
Crescent AC		–		8	–	2	–	1
Greensburg AA		–		8	–	2	–	1
Chicago AA		–		10	–	3	–	1
Elmira AC		–		6	–	2	–	0
Illinois CC		–		6	–	2	–	0
New Jersey AC		–		5	–	3	–	0
Orange AC		–		6	–	4	–	1
Duquesne CAC		–		4	–	3	–	1
Noblesville AC		–		3	–	3	–	2
Newton AA		–		4	–	4	–	1
Louisville AC		–		2	–	4	–	0
Hyde Park AA		–		0	–	3	–	2
Syracuse AA		–		1	–	5	–	0

The Pittsburgh Athletic Club played its sixth season of American football in 1895. The team finished with a record of 7–1–2.

== Schedule ==
Date	Opponent	Site	Result	Source
September 21	Beaver Falls YMCA	PAC Park; Pittsburgh, PA	W 10–0	
September 28	Shadyside Athletic Club	PAC Park; Pittsburgh, PA	W 54–0	
October 5	Grove City	PAC Park; Pittsburgh, PA	W 24–0	
October 12	Geneva	PAC Park; Pittsburgh, PA	W 26–0	
October 19	Washington & Jefferson	PAC Park; Pittsburgh, PA	W 18–4	
October 26	Kiskiminetas	PAC Park; Pittsburgh, PA	W 34–0	
November 5	at Duquesne Country and Athletic Club	Exposition Park; Allegheny, PA	T 0–0	
November 9	Greensburg Athletic Association	PAC Park; Pittsburgh, PA	T 0–0	
November 16	Penn State	PAC Park; Pittsburgh, PA	W 11–10	
November 28	Duquesne Country and Athletic Club (Note: Thanksgiving Day game) (Note: Game determined Pittsburgh-area championship.)	PAC Park; Pittsburgh, PA	L 6–10	
