= 1895 Indianapolis Light Artillery football team =

American military football team

1895 Indianapolis Light Artillery football
- Conference: Independent
- Record: 5–2
- Head coach: Winchester Osgood (1st season)
- Captain: Harold Joss
- Home stadium: East Ohio Street Baseball Park

The 1895 Indianapolis Light Artillery football team was an American football team that represented the Indianapolis Light Artillery in the 1895 college football season. The team had a 5–2 record and outscored its opponents 108 to 46.

The Artillery team had been playing since at least 1894, with contests against Purdue, Illinois, Chicago AC, and Butler on Thanksgiving. Their team manager was Robert (Bob) Navin. An October 18, 1895, article in the Indianapolis Journal asserted that the average weight of the team was 178 pounds and that the team consisted of several former collegiate football players who had finished their college days. These included Mr. Loose from Oberlin College, Mr. Dyer from the Harvard freshman team, Hal Joss from Michigan University, Nelson Olin and Sam Patterson from Purdue University, Harry Olin from Annapolis (possibly the Naval Academy), Al Sommerville from Butler in 1893, and Don Scott from Illinois University. Other players were Mr. Railsback, Mr. Johnson, and the quarterback William Hall, whose only prior experience was on the local high school team.

As the season went on, different players came in to fill the positions of the injured. Football of the day was quite dangerous, and "season-ending" injuries were very common. By the time the team played Indiana, new players included Mr. Christian, Smithy, and Owings, and by the Noblesville game, additions of Mr. Clemens, and J. Thompson were made. The final addition was Winchester Osgood for the Notre Dame game. Osgood was a star player from Penn and had helped to coach the Indiana University in the first half of 1895 before becoming a coach and player for the team. Several men on the Artillery football team combined with football players from Butler University to play the Knightstown Club on November 1, 1895, a contest they would lose 6–12 before approximately 1500 spectators. The day before the Thanksgiving Day game, Nelson Olin was forbidden from playing against Butler when it was brought to light that he made numerous penalties against the Chicago AC earlier in the week. A fight broke out within the team, and some players threatened to root for Butler, detail the Artillery team's weak spots for them, or play to mess up the Artillery team. At this time, their manager, Bob Navin, was sick in bed and so could not resolve the issue. Regardless, the Light Artillery won 28–0 in the most lopsided contest of the season. The contest with Butler was also, according to a November 29 article in the Indianapolis Journal, a "best two out of three" event, as, in the 1894 season, the two teams had played twice, with Indianapolis Light Artillery winning the first and Butler winning the second 6–4 on Thanksgiving Day.

== Previous season ==
The 1894 Indianapolis Light Artillery football team was born out of a $15,000 debt on the regiment's armory, which the organization decided to gather through entertainment. After securing their first win over Butler, 10–0, on September 28, the Indianapolis Light Artillery traveled to West Lafayette to play the Purdue Boilermakers on Stuart Field. Although they lost 4–6, Purdue would go 9–1 and become IIAA state champion in the league's last year of existence. The Artillery team beat Illinois 18–14, DePauw 46–5, and Wabash 38–12, before a Thanksgiving Day rematch against Butler. However, another match-up between DePauw and Purdue had also been scheduled in the city for the same day and time, which angered all four parties, considering the attendance and profit for both games would essentially be split in half. Purdue argued that IIAA rules mandated they play the Thanksgiving Day game against DePauw as they were the two best teams in the league, while Butler and the ILA argued that there was no rule specifying that another match-up could not be played by another member of the IIAA on the same day as the league championship. With neither party willing to back down, the two games went on despite the financial losses. The ILA's game against Butler would be played at 2:30 in the afternoon at the baseball park, with reserved room coming at 50 cents a seat. The Indianapolis Light Artillery lost to the Bulldogs, 4–6, in their final game of the season. In early 1896, after a more heated argument in the IIAA's president's meeting over whether or not to allow Athletic Clubs on the schedule any longer, Purdue backed out of the league, which led to its subsequent dissolution before the 1896 season.

== Schedule ==
Date	Time	Opponent	Site	Result	Attendance	Source
October 19	2:00 p.m.	Chicago Athletic Association	Indianapolis Baseball Park; Indianapolis, IN	L 0–16	>400	
October 24		at Indiana	Bloomington, IN	W 16–8	500	
November 2		at Noblesville Athletic Club	Indianapolis, IN	W 22–4		
November 17		at Louisville Athletic Club	Louisville, KY	W 20–12	800	
November 22		at Notre Dame	Brownson Hall field; Notre Dame, IN	W 18–0		
November 23		at Chicago Athletic Association	CAA Field; Chicago, IL	L 0–4	500	
November 28		Butler	East Ohio-Street grounds; Indianapolis, IN	W 28–0	2000–3000	

== Post-season ==
William (Winchester) Osgood would not coach the Light Artillery again, as he would join the Cuban War of Independence (1895–98, part of the greater Spanish American War), and reportedly died in March 1896. Alfred H. Sommerville would also see no more time on the gridiron, as he would die at the Indianapolis gas works by scolding hot Naphtha in May 1896. On October 6, 1896, the Indianapolis Light Artillery was banned from using the name "light artillery," as only 5 or 6 of the men on the football team were actually from the regiment. The team disbanded and reformed into the Indianapolis Athletic Association on October 10, 1896.

== Roster ==
1895 Indianapolis Light Artillery Roster
Quarterbacks: William Hall – every game besides Butler; Al Sommerville – against Butler; Right ends: Harry Olin – against Chicago AC opening, Noblesville AC, Louisville AC, Butler; Al Sommerville – against Notre Dame, Chicago AC rematch; Harold (Hal) Joss – against Indiana; Left ends: Nelson Olin – every game besides Indiana and Noblesville AC; Owings – against Indiana; Jack Thompson – against Noblesville AC	Right tackles: Harold (Hal) Joss (Captain) – every game besides Indiana; Christian – against Indiana; Left tackle: Dyer – every game; Right guard: "Baby" Railsback – every game; Left guards: Johnson – every game besides Indiana; Smithy – against Indiana	Centers: Jal Clemens – every game besides Chicago AC opening; Loosey – against Chicago AC opening; Right half backs: Al Sommerville – against Chicago AC opening, Indiana, Noblesville AC, and Louisville AC; Winchester (William) Osgood – against Notre Dame, Chicago AC rematch, and Butler; Left half backs: Sam Patterson – every game besides Louisville AC and Notre Dame; Jack Thompson – against Louisville AC, and Notre Dame; Fullback: Don Scott – every game

== Games ==
=== October 19: Chicago AC ===
This was the first football game of the 1895 season in Indianapolis, as the city formally opened its football exhibitions. Chicago AC was considered, according to the Indianapolis Journal, one of the best teams of the west (more specifically Midwest) besides Michigan University. The contest was 50 minutes long, with two 25 minute halves. Chicago AC (Also known as Chicago Athletic Association, or C.A.A) scored all of their 16 points against the Light Artillerymen in the first half. Less than 400 people watched because of a very cold wind.

=== October 24: Indiana ===
On October 23, the Indianapolis Light Artillery football team set out for Bloomington for their first collegiate contest of the year. Coming into the game, Indiana was 2–0, having won easy contests against the Louisville and Noblesville Athletic clubs, by scores of 36–0 and 30–0, respectively (two teams the Light Artillery would beat later in the season). The weather was cool and cloudy. The game was an hour-long, with 30-minute halves. The halftime score was 10–4, and the final was 16–8. One of the touchdowns scored for Indiana was by player-coach William Osgood, who would go on to assist the Light Artillery in the remainder of their football season, presumably when Robert Wrenn was hired as the new head coach for Indiana. Indiana would finish with a casual 4–3–1, although they did manage to secure their first intercollegiate win since the program was established in 1887 by beating Rose Polytechnic 8–4.

=== November 1: Knightstown Club ===
This unofficial match-up was played between a handful of players from Butler and Indianapolis Light Artillery against the Knightstown Club on the first day of November. Heralded as the most exciting and interesting game of football seen in Indianapolis for the 1895 season, 1500 spectators showed up for the exhibition. Knightstown scored first, going up 6–0 before they were tied 6–6 right before the half. The club would ultimately prevail though, beating the mix of college and semi-professional football players 12–6.

=== November 2: Noblesville AC ===
The game was played in Indianapolis, in the same ballpark as the one against Chicago AC. Noblesville came in with at least one loss to Indiana, and that is all that is known about the rather obscure program. Surrounded by an apparently riotous crowd, the Indianapolis Light Artillery met the Athletic Club on the afternoon of November 2. By halftime, the score was a tight 6–4 in favor of the Artillerymen, but the military team blew away the athletic club in the 2nd half, securing their 3rd official victory, 22–4.

=== November 17: Louisville AC ===
A good match-up between the ILA and the Louisville AC was played in Louisville in front of a crowd of 800 on a rainy Saturday afternoon. The contest was 70 minutes long, with two 35-minute halves. The Artillerymen scored early points in the first half to go up 10–0, before Louisville rallied with two field goals to usurp the military team 12–10 at the half in favor of the AC. This was the first time since Chicago AC that the Light Artillery had faced a halftime deficit. The military team came out of the 2nd half with 10 unanswered points by left halfback Thompson and kicker Don Scott to win 20–12.

=== November 22: Notre Dame ===
In a minor upset, The Indianapolis Light Artillery beat Notre Dame 18–0, on their own Cartier Field in South Bend. This game is famous because of HG Haddon, coach of the 1895 Notre Dame football team, who inserted himself into the lineup as a left tackle, gaining considerable ground on the semi-professionals before the end of the game through a returned kickoff, recovering a fumble, and a number of other carries. Immediately after the game, the ILA left for Chicago for a rematch with the Chicago Athletic Association's football team.

=== November 23: Chicago AC ===
In the second contest between the two teams, Chicago AC won by a narrow margin of 4–0. The day was cold and icy, with only 500 spectators coming to watch the event in Chicago. The game was 40 minutes long, with two 20-minute halves. After a scoreless half, Chicago scored a controversial touchdown that awarded them the 4 points they needed to win. The Light Artillery blamed the linesman for bad officiating and bias towards the Chicago team, as one of the linesmen was a brother of a Chicago AC player.

=== Thanksgiving Day Game: Butler ===
The Indianapolis Light Artillery destroyed Butler to close out the 1895 season at the East Ohio-Street grounds in Indianapolis. The game was over from the start, with the Butler players apparently unable to move the ball without penalties, and a 22–0 ILA lead by the half. The game was 70 minutes long, with two 35-minute halves.
