= Winchester Osgood =

American football player and coach (1870–1896)

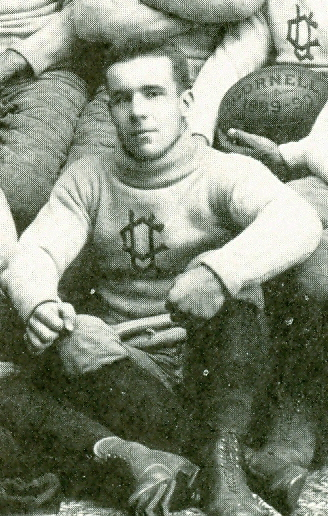
- Osgood in 1889

Biographical details
- Born: April 12, 1870; Fort Barrancas, Florida, U.S.
- Died: October 18, 1896 (aged 26); Cuba

Playing career
- 1888–1889: Cornell
- 1891–1892: Cornell
- 1893–1894: Penn
- Position: Halfback

Coaching career (HC unless noted)
- 1895: Indiana

Head coaching record
- Overall: 4–3–1
- College Football Hall of Fame; Inducted in 1970 (profile)

Winchester Dana Osgood (April 12, 1870 – October 18, 1896) was a prominent American college athlete in the late 19th century at both Cornell University and University of Pennsylvania. He played halfback on the football teams at both schools and served as the head football coach at Indiana University for one season in 1895, compiling a record of 4–3–1. Osgood volunteered for the Cuban forces during Cuba’s fight for Independence from Spain. He was commissioned a major in artillery in the Cuban Army and was killed in combat. Osgood was inducted into the College Football Hall of Fame as a player in 1970.

== Early life ==
Born in Fort Barrancas, Florida, Osgood was one of five children of an American army officer Henry Brown Osgood Jr. and his wife, Harriet Mary (Hubbard) Osgood. Henry Osgood eventfully rose to the rank of brigadier general.

== College athlete ==
Osgood, nicknamed "Win", was one of the greatest college athletes of the 19th century. He was talented in many sports but is best known for his exploits as an All-American football player. Osgood stood 5–9, weighed 173, and was an elusive runner. Pudge Heffelfinger, the legendary All-American from Yale University, gave this description of Osgood: "It was downright uncanny to watch him run, opponents missed him by inches. His body undulated like a snake's. He was the Red Grange of the pioneer era."

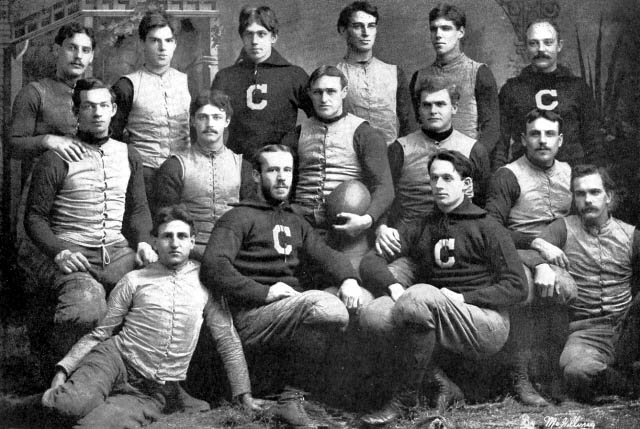
1892 Cornell varsity football team: Osgood is the second from the left in the front row.

=== Cornell ===
At Cornell, Osgood received a medal as the school's best all-around athlete. He ran the 440 and put the shot for the track team, was an accomplished gymnast, boxer, wrestler, tennis player, and set a collegiate record of 5:28 for the 2-mile bicycle race. Osgood played halfback for four years for the Cornell football team, 1888–1889 and 1891–1892, during which time Cornell went 28–8. Osgood was a considered one of the top players in the early years of Big Red football. In an article on January 29, 1927, The Sun named him to the first team of the all-time Cornell football team. Osgood also rowed on the varsity in 1890. In 1892, he was the single scull championship of the Cornell. He left Cornell in the fall of 1892 to attend the University of Pennsylvania, drawing controversy over whether or not he was paid to do so. In an affidavit given on October 28, 1893, he stated he "would be afforded more advantageous opportunities" for civil engineering upon graduation.

=== Pennsylvania ===
At Pennsylvania, Osgood continued his exploits as a three-sport athlete, excelling at football, track and field, and wrestling. He lettered two seasons at halfback for the Quakers under Hall of Fame coach George Washington Woodruff. In his first year, he helped the 1893 Quakers to a 12–3 record. The team had a strong start, winning its first 11 games. During that stretch, the defense only gave up 18 points while the offense scored 305 points. But Penn lost three out of the last four games to perennial powers Harvard, Yale and Princeton. At the time Penn rarely beat the "Big Three", as they were known. Osgood received widespread press in the 14–6 loss to Yale, as he scored Penn’s only touchdown in the game. Yale had not been scored upon on for 35 straight games dating back to 1890, having amassed 1,355 unanswered points. In 1894, Osgood helped Penn to its first undefeated season. The 1894 squad featured one of the greatest backfields of all time, consisting of Carl Sheldon Williams at quarterback, George Brooke at fullback, and Osgood and Alden Knipe at halfback. Osgood, Knipe and Brooke were all named to Walter Camp's All-American first team that year. The team was widely recognized as 1894's football national champion. The highlight of the season was a 12–0 victory over Princeton, only Penn's second win in 30 meetings with the Tigers, and an 18–4 victory over Harvard.

=== Other sports ===
Throughout his college career, Osgood participated in other sports outside of football. He took up boxing after losing a fight during a 1891 football game at the University of Chicago, with the hopes of "evening up things if he ever met the slugger again." Around 3 years later, he would win the collegiate heavyweight boxing championship. Osgood also excelled at wrestling. He became the first collegiate athlete to win a national championship when he won the 1895 National AAU title in the "heavyweight" class (for competitors over 158 pounds). At the time the sport was dominated by club teams.

In 1894, Osgood became a letterwinner for the University of Pennsylvania's Men's Track & Field team, for the 440-yard dash and shot put. He also was a gymnast for Pennsylvania's Men's gymnastics team, a champion single scull rower, and a tennis player. With a time of 5:28, he set the 2-mile collegiate record for cycling on May 13, 1893, repeatedly breaking his own record with times of 5:08 on June 6, 1894, 4:55 on June 4, 1895, and 4:49 on the same day.

== Indianapolis light Artillery ==
After a brief stint as an assistant coach for the University of Indiana's football team, Osgood joined the Indianapolis Light Artillery as both player and coach somewhere after their October 24 contest together. he would lead them to a record of 5–2, with an impressive win 18–0 over an undefeated Notre Dame and a 28-0 blank of Butler University on Thanksgiving.

== Cuba’s fight for independence ==
When Cuba began its fight for independence from Spain, Osgood volunteered for the Cuban forces. He was commissioned a major in the artillery under General Calixto Garcia. Early in October 1896, the Cuban General Garcia and General Maximo Gomez joined forces and moved upon Guaimaro, which was strongly fortified and defended by the Spaniards. After much hard fighting and a brilliant charge led by Colonel Mario García Menocal, the largest fortification was taken. During the battle, Major Osgood was in charge of shelling several blockhouses with a Hotchkiss rifle using 12-pound shells. Osgood's artillery unit was under steady fire from small arms. When Osgood stooped over the gun to adjust the sight to account for the wind, he made the remark, “think that will do.” At that moment, he was hit by a bullet fired by a sharp-shooter stationed in the church tower eleven hundred yards away. Osgood was carried from the location by his comrades and hurried down the hill to the aid station. Without re-sighting the artillery piece, Osgood’s second in command Major Frederick Funston gave the order to fire the gun and the shell hit one of the blockhouses. The bullet that hit Osgood had gone through his brain and he did not recover from his wounds.

== Personal life ==
A year after Osgood's death in Cuba, a story was published in the New York Herald about his love interest, Caroline Davis, and how she was the reason Osgood began playing sports. They initially met in Wilbraham Academy, with Osgood trying out for the football team to try and impress her, to no avail. In his final year at the school, he failed to make the football team. The two split after graduating from the preparatory school, with Osgood going to Cornell University and Davis moving to Philadelphia. They were re-united in Philadelphia after Osgood transferred to the University of Pennsylvania in 1892. Despite Osgood's athletic prowess and his efforts in relocating to the same city, she married another man.

Disappointed, Osgood apparently claimed he needed "the excitement and the danger to make [him] forget" and volunteered to fight in the Cuban war for independence. A teammate of his for the 1894 Penn Track & Field team confirmed in 1920 that "a disappointment in a love affair led to his going to the aid of the Revolution in Cuba, where he met death while sighting a piece of artillery".

== Head coaching record ==
Year	Team	Overall	Conference	Standing	Bowl/playoffs
Indiana Hoosiers (Indiana Intercollegiate Athletic Association) (1895)
1895	Indiana	4–3–1			
Indiana:		4–3–1			
Indianapolis Light Artillery (Independent) (1895)
1895	Indianapolis Light Artillery	5–2			
Indianapolis Light Artillery:		5–2			
Total:		9–5–1			
