= H. G. Hadden =

American football player and coach

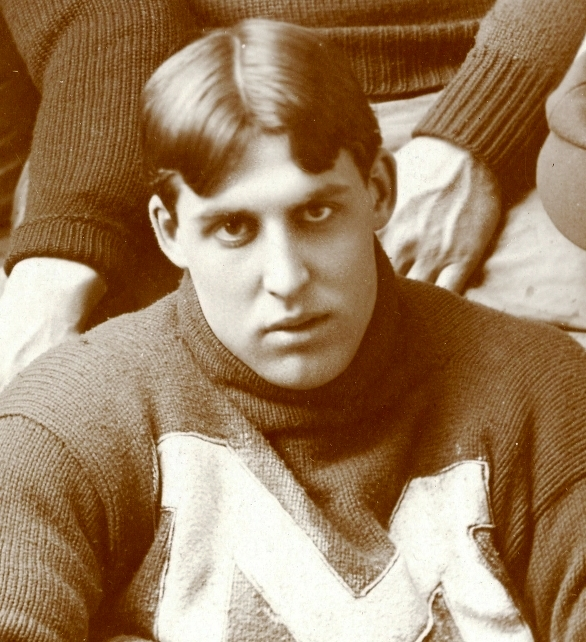

Biographical details
- Born: August 30, 1874
- Died: October 13, 1945 (aged 71)

Playing career
- 1894: Michigan
- 1895–1896: Chicago Athletic Association
- 1895: Notre Dame
- 1896: Allegheny Athletic Association
- 1897: Bankers Athletic Club
- Position: Tackle

Coaching career (HC unless noted)
- 1895: Notre Dame
- 1899: Michigan (assistant)

Head coaching record
- Overall: 3–1

Harry Graydon Hadden (August 30, 1874 – October 13, 1945) was an American football player and coach. Hadden was born in 1874 and raised in the Englewood section of Chicago. He graduated from the University of Michigan Law Department with an LLB degree in 1895. While attending law school, Hadden played tackle for the 1894 Michigan Wolverines football team. Following a tour with the Chicago Athletic Association, he transferred to Notre Dame, where he not only coached the football team in 1895, but also inserted himself into the lineup during a loss to Indianapolis Artillery. He served as the head coach at the University of Notre Dame in 1895, tallying a mark of 3–1. While back with the Chicago Athletic Association in 1896, he and several teammates traveled to the Pittsburgh area to play for the Allegheny Athletic Association, leading to their expulsion from the Chicago club. In the following season, he and the other expelled players joined a rival Chicago team, the Bankers Athletic Club. The Bankers went undefeated that year and proclaimed themselves the athletic club football champions of the United States. Hadden returned to Michigan as an assistant coach in 1899. In 1902, he was employed by the Knickerbocker Ice Company in Chicago. As of 1912, he was employed as a sales agent in Kenilworth, Illinois. At the time of his registration for the draft in 1918, Hadden was living and working in Washington, D.C., as Assistant Supervisor of the U.S. Shipping Board, Emergency Fleet Corp. He suffered burns on his face and hands in a fire at a two-story building in Washington, D.C., in November 1918. As of 1941, he was retired and living in New York City.

== Head coaching record ==
Year	Team	Overall	Conference	Standing	Bowl/playoffs
Notre Dame (Independent) (1895)
1895	Notre Dame	3–1			
Notre Dame:		3–1			
Total:		3–1			
