= 1895 Duquesne Country and Athletic Club season =

American football team season

1895 Duquesne Country and Athletic Club football
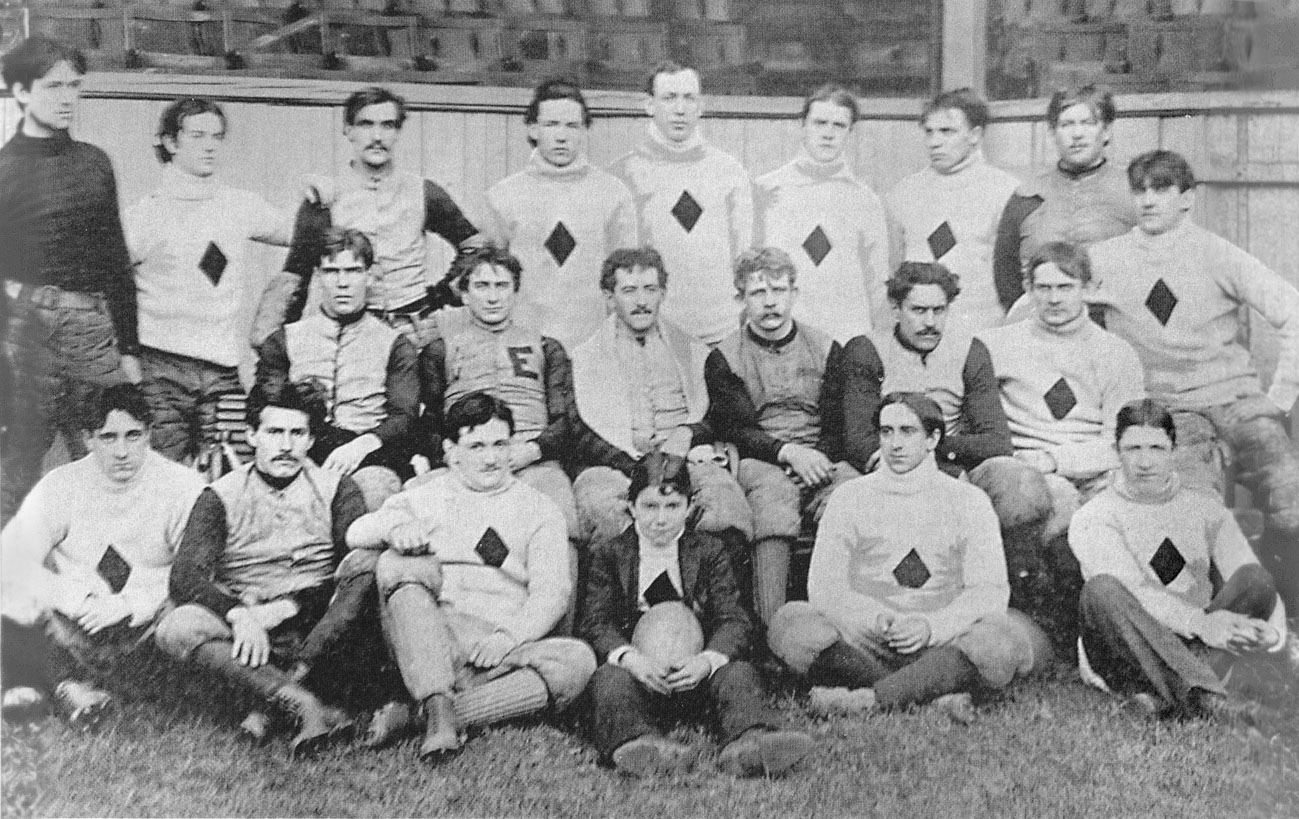
- Record: 4–3–1
- Manager: William Chase Temple
- Head coach: Louis Vail
- Captain: Ed Young
- Home field: Exposition Park

The Duquesne Country and Athletic Club (DC&AC) played its first season of American football in 1895. The team compiled a 4–3–1 record and won the unofficial championship of Western Pennsylvania when it defeated the Pittsburgh Athletic Club on Thanksgiving to end the season.

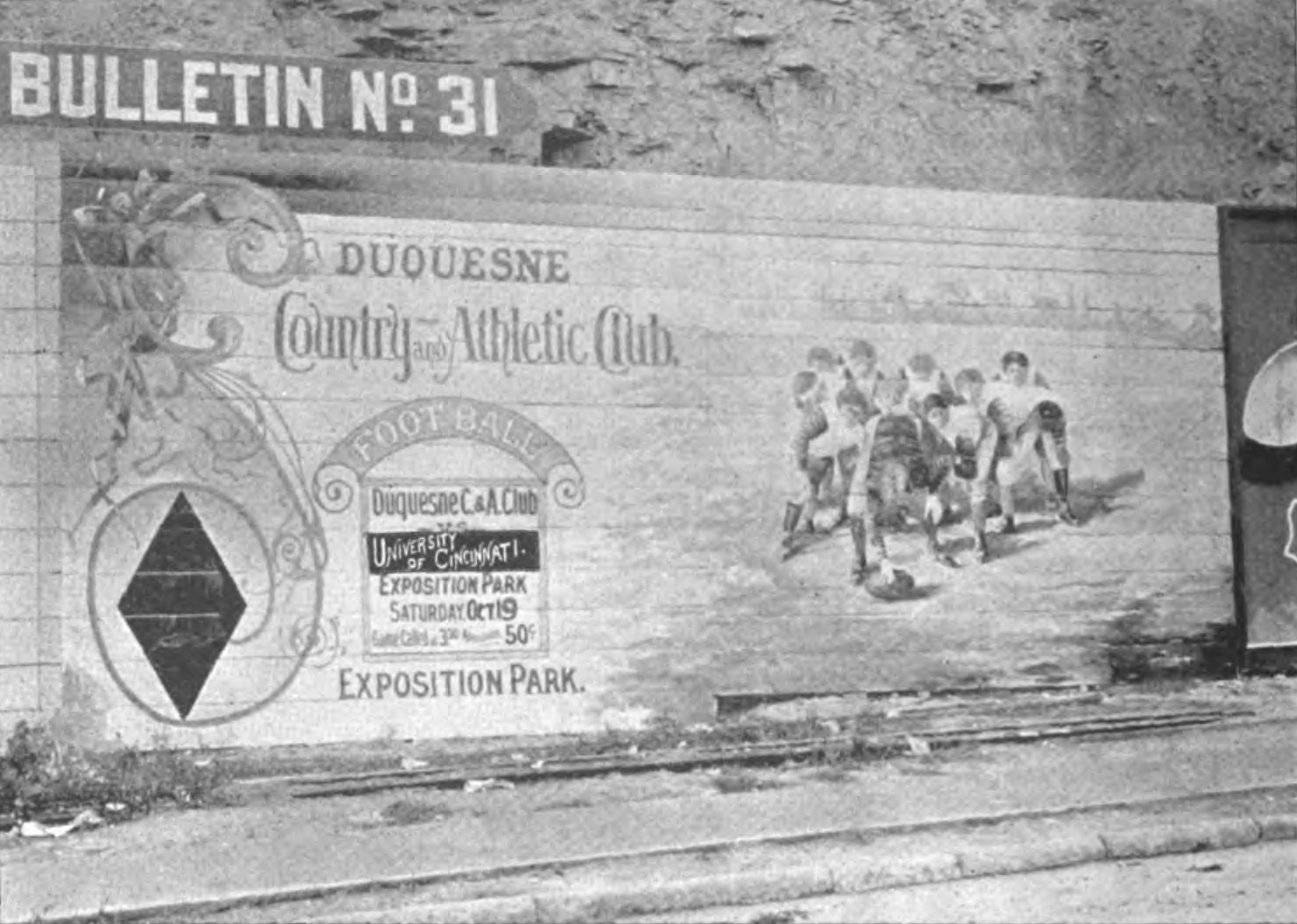
Billboard advertising the Oct. 19 game against the University of Cincinnati

The team was not yet openly professional, but is known to have offered payments to three Greensburg Athletic Association players—Charlie Atherton, Fred Robison, and Lawson Fiscus—to play for the DC&AC. The three players ultimately accepted counteroffers to remain with Greensburg.

== Schedule ==
| Date | Opponent | Site | Result | Attendance | Source |
|---|---|---|---|---|---|
| October 5 | Western University of Pennsylvania | Exposition Park; Allegheny City, PA | W 36–0 | 550 | |
| October 12 | Carlisle | Exposition Park; Allegheny City, PA | L 4–16 | | |
| October 19 | Cincinnati | Exposition Park; Allegheny City, PA | W 26–0 | 200–300 | |
| October 23 | Penn | Exposition Park; Allegheny City, PA | L 0–30 | 4,000–5,000 | |
| November 5 | Pittsburgh Athletic Club | Exposition Park; Allegheny City, PA | T 0–0 | 4,300 | |
| November 9 | Chicago Athletic Association | Exposition Park; Allegheny City, PA | L 4–34 | | |
| November 16 | Greensburg Athletic Association | Exposition Park; Allegheny City, PA | W 12–0 | | |
| November 28 | at Pittsburgh Athletic Club | PAC Park; Pittsburgh, PA | W 10–6 | 8,000–9,000 | |
