= List of Indiana Hoosiers football seasons =

This is a list of seasons completed by the Indiana Hoosiers football program since the team's conception in 1885, even though there were no documented games until the 1887 season. The list documents season-by-season records, and conference records from 1900 to the present.

== Seasons ==
| Year | Coach | Overall | Conference | Standing | Bowl/playoffs | Coaches^{#} | AP^{°} |
|---|---|---|---|---|---|---|---|
Arthur B. Woodford (Independent) (1887–1888)
| 1887 | Arthur B. Woodford | 0–1 | | | | | |
| 1888 | Arthur B. Woodford | 0–0–1 | | | | | |
Evans Wollen (Independent) (1889–1890)
| 1889 | Evans Wollen | 0–1–1 | | | | | |
| 1890 | No team | | | | | | |
Joseph R. Herod (Independent) (1891)
| 1891 | Joseph R. Herod | 1–5 | | | | | |
| 1892 | No coach | 0–4 | | | | | |
| 1893 | No coach | 1–4–1 | | | | | |
Gustave Ferbert & Joseph R. Hudelson (Independent) (1894)
| 1894 | Ferbert & Hudelson | 0–4–1 | | | | | |
Winchester Osgood & Robert Wrenn (Independent) (1895)
| 1895 | Osgood & Wrenn | 4–3–1 | | | | | |
Madison G. Gonterman (Independent) (1896–1897)
| 1896 | Madison G. Gonterman | 5–3 | | | | | |
| 1897 | Madison G. Gonterman | 6–1–1 | | | | | |
James H. Horne (Independent) (1898–1899)
| 1898 | James H. Horne | 4–1–2 | | | | | |
| 1899 | James H. Horne | 6–2 | | | | | |
James H. Horne (Western Conference) (1900–1904)
| 1900 | James H. Horne | 4–2–2 | 1–2–1 | 7th | | | |
| 1901 | James H. Horne | 6–3 | 1–2 | 6th | | | |
| 1902 | James H. Horne | 3–5–1 | 0–4 | T–7th | | | |
| 1903 | James H. Horne | 4–4 | 1–2 | 6th | | | |
| 1904 | James H. Horne | 6–4 | 0–3 | T–7th | | | |
James M. Sheldon (Western Conference) (1905–1913)
| 1905 | James M. Sheldon | 8–1–1 | 0–1–1 | T–6th | | | |
| 1906 | James M. Sheldon | 4–2 | 0–2 | T–6th | | | |
| 1907 | James M. Sheldon | 2–3–1 | 0–3 | T–5th | | | |
| 1908 | James M. Sheldon | 3–4 | 1–3 | T–4th | | | |
| 1909 | James M. Sheldon | 4–3 | 1–3 | T–5th | | | |
| 1910 | James M. Sheldon | 6–1 | 3–1 | 3rd | | | |
| 1911 | James M. Sheldon | 3–3–1 | 0–3–1 | 8th | | | |
| 1912 | James M. Sheldon | 2–5 | 0–5 | 8th | | | |
| 1913 | James M. Sheldon | 3–4 | 2–4 | 6th | | | |
Clarence C. Childs (Western Conference) (1914–1915)
| 1914 | Clarence C. Childs | 3–4 | 1–4 | 8th | | | |
| 1915 | Clarence C. Childs | 3–3–1 | 1–3 | 8th | | | |
Jumbo Stiehm (Western Conference) (1916–1921)
| 1916 | Jumbo Stiehm | 2–4–1 | 0–3–1 | T–8th | | | |
| 1917 | Jumbo Stiehm | 5–2 | 1–2 | 7th | | | |
| 1918 | Jumbo Stiehm | 2–2 | 0–0 | N/A | | | |
| 1919 | Jumbo Stiehm | 3–4 | 0–2 | T–9th | | | |
| 1920 | Jumbo Stiehm | 5–2 | 3–1 | 3rd | | | |
| 1921 | Jumbo Stiehm | 3–4 | 1–2 | T–6th | | | |
James P. Herron (Western Conference) (1922)
| 1922 | James P. Herron | 1–4–2 | 0–2–1 | T–9th | | | |
William A. Ingram (Western Conference) (1923–1925)
| 1923 | William A. Ingram | 3–4 | 2–2 | T–5th | | | |
| 1924 | William A. Ingram | 4–4 | 1–3 | 7th | | | |
| 1925 | William A. Ingram | 3–4–1 | 0–3–1 | T–9th | | | |
Pat Page (Western Conference) (1926–1930)
| 1926 | Pat Page | 3–5 | 0–4 | T–8th | | | |
| 1927 | Pat Page | 3–4–1 | 1–2–1 | 8th | | | |
| 1928 | Pat Page | 4–4 | 2–4 | 9th | | | |
| 1929 | Pat Page | 2–6–1 | 1–3–1 | T–8th | | | |
| 1930 | Pat Page | 2–5–1 | 1–3 | T–6th | | | |
Earl C. Hayes (Western Conference) (1931–1933)
| 1931 | Earl C. Hayes | 2–5–1 | 1–4–1 | 7th | | | |
| 1932 | Earl C. Hayes | 3–4–1 | 1–4–1 | 9th | | | |
| 1933 | Earl C. Hayes | 1–5–2 | 0–3–2 | T–8th | | | |
Bo McMillin (Western Conference) (1934–1947)
| 1934 | Bo McMillin | 3–3–2 | 1–3–1 | T–8th | | | |
| 1935 | Bo McMillin | 4–3–1 | 2–2–1 | T–3rd | | | |
| 1936 | Bo McMillin | 5–2–1 | 3–1–1 | T–4th | | | |
| 1937 | Bo McMillin | 5–3 | 3–2 | 3rd | | | |
| 1938 | Bo McMillin | 1–6–1 | 1–4 | 9th | | | |
| 1939 | Bo McMillin | 2–4–2 | 2–3 | T–7th | | | |
| 1940 | Bo McMillin | 3–5 | 2–3 | T–6th | | | |
| 1941 | Bo McMillin | 2–6 | 1–3 | T–7th | | | |
| 1942 | Bo McMillin | 7–3 | 2–2 | T–5th | | | |
| 1943 | Bo McMillin | 4–4–2 | 2–3–1 | T–4th | | | |
| 1944 | Bo McMillin | 7–3 | 4–3 | 5th | | | |
| 1945 | Bo McMillin | 9–0–1 | 5–0–1 | 1st | | | 4 |
| 1946 | Bo McMillin | 6–3 | 4–2 | 3rd | | | 20 |
| 1947 | Bo McMillin | 5–3–1 | 2–3–1 | T–6th | | | |
Clyde B. Smith (Western Conference) (1948–1951)
| 1948 | Clyde B. Smith | 2–7 | 2–4 | T–5th | | | |
| 1949 | Clyde B. Smith | 1–8 | 0–6 | 9th | | | |
| 1950 | Clyde B. Smith | 3–5–1 | 1–4 | T–8th | | | |
| 1951 | Clyde B. Smith | 2–7 | 1–5 | 8th | | | |
Bernie Crimmins (Western / Big Ten Conference) (1952–1956)
| 1952 | Bernie Crimmins | 2–7 | 1–5 | 9th | | | |
| 1953 | Bernie Crimmins | 2–7 | 1–5 | 9th | | | |
| 1954 | Bernie Crimmins | 3–6 | 2–4 | 7th | | | |
| 1955 | Bernie Crimmins | 3–6 | 1–5 | 9th | | | |
| 1956 | Bernie Crimmins | 3–6 | 1–5 | 10th | | | |
Bob Hicks (Big Ten Conference) (1957)
| 1957 | Bob Hicks | 1–8 | 0–6 | 9th | | | |
Phil Dickens (Big Ten Conference) (1958–1964)
| 1958 | Phil Dickens | 5–3–1 | 3–2–1 | 5th | | | |
| 1959 | Phil Dickens | 4–4–1 | 2–4–1 | T–8th | | | |
| 1960 | Phil Dickens | 1–8 | 0–7 | 10th | | | |
| 1961 | Phil Dickens | 2–7 | 0–6 | T–9th | | | |
| 1962 | Phil Dickens | 3–6 | 1–5 | 9th | | | |
| 1963 | Phil Dickens | 3–6 | 1–5 | 10th | | | |
| 1964 | Phil Dickens | 2–7 | 1–5 | T–9th | | | |
John Pont (Big Ten Conference) (1965–1972)
| 1965 | John Pont | 2–8 | 1–6 | 9th | | | |
| 1966 | John Pont | 1–8–1 | 1–5–1 | 9th | | | |
| 1967 | John Pont | 9–2 | 6–1 | 1st | L Rose | 6 | 4 |
| 1968 | John Pont | 6–4 | 4–3 | T–5th | | | |
| 1969 | John Pont | 4–6 | 3–4 | T–5th | | | |
| 1970 | John Pont | 1–9 | 1–6 | T–9th | | | |
| 1971 | John Pont | 3–8 | 2–6 | 9th | | | |
| 1972 | John Pont | 5–6 | 3–5 | T–6th | | | |
Lee Corso (Big Ten Conference) (1973–1982)
| 1973 | Lee Corso | 2–9 | 0–8 | T–9th | | | |
| 1974 | Lee Corso | 1–10 | 1–7 | 10th | | | |
| 1975 | Lee Corso | 2–8–1 | 1–6–1 | 10th | | | |
| 1976 | Lee Corso | 5–6 | 4–4 | T–5th | | | |
| 1977 | Lee Corso | 5–5–1 | 4–3–1 | 4th | | | |
| 1978 | Lee Corso | 4–7 | 3–5 | 7th | | | |
| 1979 | Lee Corso | 8–4 | 5–3 | 4th | W Holiday | 16 | 19 |
| 1980 | Lee Corso | 6–5 | 3–5 | 6th | | | |
| 1981 | Lee Corso | 3–8 | 3–6 | 8th | | | |
| 1982 | Lee Corso | 5–6 | 4–5 | 6th | | | |
Sam Wyche (Big Ten Conference) (1983)
| 1983 | Sam Wyche | 3–8 | 2–7 | T–8th | | | |
Bill Mallory (Big Ten Conference) (1984–1996)
| 1984 | Bill Mallory | 0–11 | 0–9 | 10th | | | |
| 1985 | Bill Mallory | 4–7 | 1–7 | T–9th | | | |
| 1986 | Bill Mallory | 6–6 | 3–5 | T–6th | L All-American | | |
| 1987 | Bill Mallory | 8–4 | 6–2 | T–2nd | L Peach | 20 | |
| 1988 | Bill Mallory | 8–3–1 | 5–3 | T–5th | W Liberty | 20 | 20 |
| 1989 | Bill Mallory | 5–6 | 3–5 | T–6th | | | |
| 1990 | Bill Mallory | 6–5–1 | 3–4–1 | 7th | L Peach | | |
| 1991 | Bill Mallory | 7–4–1 | 5–3 | T–3rd | W Copper | | |
| 1992 | Bill Mallory | 5–6 | 3–5 | T–6th | | | |
| 1993 | Bill Mallory | 8–4 | 5–3 | T–4th | L Independence | | |
| 1994 | Bill Mallory | 6–5 (Note: Michigan State self-forfeited all wins in the 1994 season, resulting in Indiana's 1994 loss to Michigan State being retroactively changed to a win.) | 3–5 | T–8th | | | |
| 1995 | Bill Mallory | 2–9 | 0–8 | T–9th | | | |
| 1996 | Bill Mallory | 3–8 | 1–7 | T–9th | | | |
Cam Cameron (Big Ten Conference) (1997–2001)
| 1997 | Cam Cameron | 2–9 | 1–7 | T–9th | | | |
| 1998 | Cam Cameron | 4–7 | 2–6 | T–7th | | | |
| 1999 | Cam Cameron | 4–7 | 3–5 | T–8th | | | |
| 2000 | Cam Cameron | 3–8 | 2–6 | T–9th | | | |
| 2001 | Cam Cameron | 5–6 | 4–4 | T–4th | | | |
Gerry DiNardo (Big Ten Conference) (2002–2004)
| 2002 | Gerry DiNardo | 3–9 | 1–7 | T–10th | | | |
| 2003 | Gerry DiNardo | 2–10 | 1–7 | T–9th | | | |
| 2004 | Gerry DiNardo | 3–8 | 1–7 | T–10th | | | |
Terry Hoeppner (Big Ten Conference) (2005–2006)
| 2005 | Terry Hoeppner | 4–7 | 1–7 | 10th | | | |
| 2006 | Terry Hoeppner | 5–7 | 3–5 | T–6th | | | |
Bill Lynch (Big Ten Conference) (2007–2010)
| 2007 | Bill Lynch | 7–6 | 3–5 | T–5th | L Insight | | |
| 2008 | Bill Lynch | 3–9 | 1–7 | 11th | | | |
| 2009 | Bill Lynch | 4–8 | 1–7 | T–10th | | | |
| 2010 | Bill Lynch | 5–7 | 1–7 | 11th | | | |
Kevin Wilson (Big Ten Conference) (2011–2016)
| 2011 | Kevin Wilson | 1–11 | 0–8 | 6th (Leaders) | | | |
| 2012 | Kevin Wilson | 4–8 | 2–6 | 5th (Leaders) | | | |
| 2013 | Kevin Wilson | 5–7 | 3–5 | 4th (Leaders) | | | |
| 2014 | Kevin Wilson | 4–8 | 1–7 | 7th (East) | | | |
| 2015 | Kevin Wilson | 6–7 | 2–6 | 5th (East) | L Pinstripe | | |
| 2016 | Kevin Wilson (Note: On December 1, 2016, Indiana announced that Kevin Wilson had been dismissed due to "philosophical differences", and that Tom Allen would permanently succeed Wilson as head coach, beginning at the bowl game.) | 6–7 | 4–5 | 4th (East) | L Foster Farms | | |
Tom Allen (Big Ten Conference) (2016–2023)
| 2017 | Tom Allen | 5–7 | 2–7 | 7th (East) | | | |
| 2018 | Tom Allen | 5–7 | 2–7 | 6th (East) | | | |
| 2019 | Tom Allen | 8–5 | 5–4 | 4th (East) | L Gator | | |
| 2020 | Tom Allen | 6–2 | 6–1 | 2nd (East) | L Outback | 13 | 12 |
| 2021 | Tom Allen | 2–10 | 0–9 | 7th (East) | | | |
| 2022 | Tom Allen | 4–8 | 2–7 | 6th (East) | | | |
| 2023 | Tom Allen | 3–9 | 1–8 | 7th (East) | | | |
Curt Cignetti (Big Ten Conference) (2024–present)
| 2024 | Curt Cignetti | 11–2 | 8–1 | T–2nd | L CFP First Round^{†} | 10 | 10 |
| 2025 | Curt Cignetti | 16–0 | 9–0 | 1st | W Rose^{†} (CFP Quarterfinal); W Peach^{†} (CFP Semifinal); W CFP NCG^{†} | 1 | 1 |
| Total: | | 515–719–46 | | | | | |
National championship Conference title Conference division title or championship game berth
^{†}Indicates Bowl Coalition, Bowl Alliance, BCS, or CFP / New Years' Six bowl.; ^{#}Rankings from final Coaches Poll.
