= List of Indiana Hoosiers head football coaches =

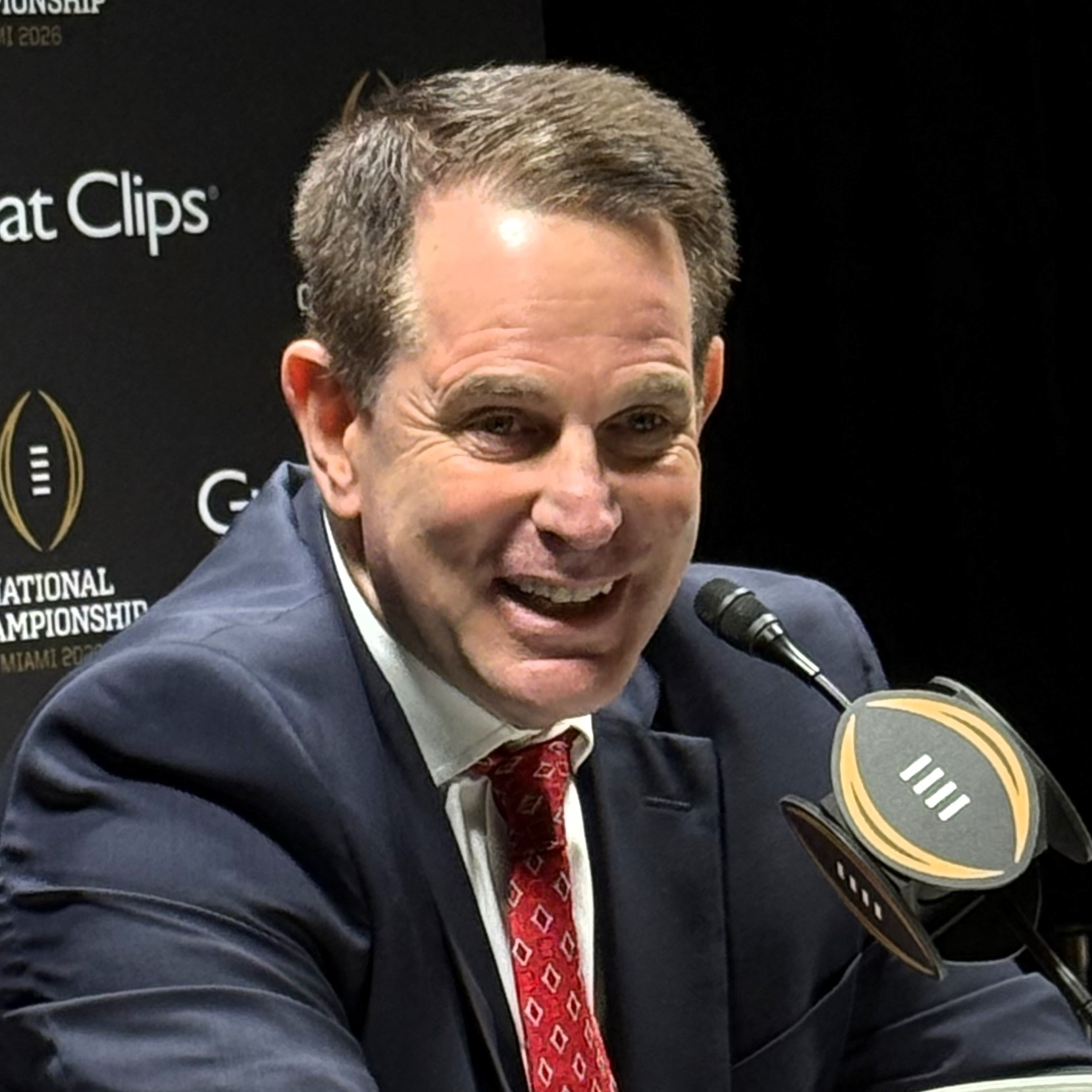
Curt Cignetti has served as head coach at Indiana since 2024.

The Indiana Hoosiers football team represents Indiana University in the Big Ten Conference. The Hoosiers compete as part of the National Collegiate Athletic Association (NCAA) Division I Football Bowl Subdivision. The program has had 30 different head coaches since it began play during the 1887 season. Over 139 seasons, the Hoosiers have compiled an overall record of 517 wins, 714 losses, and 44 ties (.423 all-time winning percentage).

Seven different head coaches have led the Hoosiers to postseason bowl games: John Pont, Lee Corso, Bill Mallory, Bill Lynch, Kevin Wilson, Tom Allen, and Curt Cignetti. Indiana has a 3–11 record over 14 bowl games in which they have competed. The Hoosiers have been guided to the Big Ten Conference title twice: in 1945 by Bo McMillin and in 1967 by Pont. The 1967 season culminated in the Hoosiers' first and only Rose Bowl appearance, a 14–3 loss to USC.

McMillin spent the most seasons (14) as the Indiana head coach, but Bill Mallory has led the Hoosiers for the most games (149). Mallory took the program to six different bowl games, far more than any other coach in school history. The highest winning percentage by any coach is Cignetti with (.846). The lowest winning percentage for any coach in the modern era is by Bob Hicks, who went 1–8 (.111) in 1957, his only season at the helm.

In 2007, head coach Terry Hoeppner died of brain cancer. Offensive coordinator Bill Lynch took over as head coach and led the 2007 Hoosiers to a 7–6 season, which included a last-second win over rival Purdue in the Bucket Game and a trip to the Insight Bowl. The bowl berth was the first for the Hoosiers in 14 years.

Kevin Wilson would take over the Hoosiers football program in December 2011. With an overall record of 26–47, Wilson would bring the Hoosiers to their first bowl game since 2007, at the 2015 Pinstripe Bowl. This would be Wilson's only bowl game, as Wilson resigned on December 1, 2016, amidst "philosophical differences" with Athletic Director Fred Glass and allegations of player mistreatment.

Tom Allen succeeded Wilson. Indiana was the first head coaching job for Allen, who was promoted from defensive coordinator to head coach in December 2016. Allen's first game as head coach of the Hoosiers was on December 28, 2016, in the Foster Farms Bowl. Allen coached the Hoosiers in three bowl games total, including during the 2020 season when Indiana finished 12th in the AP poll. Allen was fired after the 2023 season, which concluded three straight losing seasons with a combined 3–24 Big Ten Conference record. Curt Cignetti was named the 30th head coach at Indiana in November 2023.

== Key ==
Key to symbols in coaches list
General		Overall		Conference		Postseason (Note: Although the first Rose Bowl Game was played in 1902, it has been continuously played since the 1916 game, and is recognized as the oldest bowl game by the NCAA. "—" indicates any season prior to 1916 when postseason games were not played.)	
No.	Order of coaches (Note: A running total of the number of head coaches, with coaches who served separate tenures being counted only once. Interim head coaches are represented with "Int" and are not counted in the running total. "—" indicates the team played but either without a coach or no coach is on record. "X" indicates an interim year without play.)	GC	Games coached	CW	Conference wins	PW	Postseason wins
DC	Division championships	OW	Overall wins	CL	Conference losses	PL	Postseason losses
CC	Conference championships	OL	Overall losses	CT	Conference ties	PT	Postseason ties
NC	National championships	OT	Overall ties (Note: Overtime rules in college football were introduced in 1996, making ties impossible in the period since.)	C%	Conference winning percentage		
†	Elected to the College Football Hall of Fame	O%	Overall winning percentage (Note: When computing the win–loss percentage, a tie counts as half a win and half a loss.)				

== Coaches ==
List of head football coaches showing season(s) coached, overall records, conference records (Note: Indiana has been a member of Big Ten Conference since the 1899 season.), postseason records, championships and selected awards (Note: Statistics correct as of the end of the 2024 NCAA Division I FBS football season.)
No.	Name	Season(s)	GC	OW	OL	OT	O%	CW	CL	CT	C%	PW	PL	PT	DCs	CCs	NCs	National Awards
1	Arthur B. Woodford	1887–1888	2	0	1	1	0.250	—	—	—	—	—	—	—	—	—	0	—
2	Evans Woollen	1889	2	0	2	0	.000	—	—	—	—	—	—	—	—	—	0	—
3	Joseph R. Herod	1891	6	1	5	0	0.167	—	—	—	—	—	—	—	—	—	0	—
0	No coach	1892–1893	10	3	6	1	0.350	—	—	—	—	—	—	—	—	—	0	—
4	Gustave Ferbert & Joseph R. Hudelson	1894	5	0	4	1	0.100	—	—	—	—	—	—	—	—	—	0	—
5	Winchester Osgood & Robert Wrenn	1895	8	4	3	1	0.563	—	—	—	—	—	—	—	—	—	0	—
6	Madison G. Gonterman	1896–1897	16	11	4	1	0.719	—	—	—	—	—	—	—	—	—	0	—
7	James H. Horne	1898–1904	59	33	21	5	0.602	3	13	1	0.206	—	—	—	—	0	0	—
8	James M. Sheldon	1905–1913	64	35	26	3	0.570	7	25	2	0.235	—	—	—	—	0	0	—
9	Clarence Childs	1914–1915	14	6	7	1	0.464	2	7	0	0.222	—	—	—	—	0	0	—
10	Ewald O. Stiehm	1916–1921	39	20	18	1	0.526	5	10	1	0.344	—	—	—	—	0	0	—
11	James P. Herron	1922	7	1	4	2	0.286	0	2	1	0.167	—	—	—	—	0	0	—
12	Bill Ingram^{†}	1923–1925	23	10	12	1	0.457	3	8	1	0.292	—	—	—	—	0	0	—
13	Harlan Page	1926–1930	41	14	24	3	0.378	5	16	2	0.261	—	—	—	—	0	0	—
14	Earl C. Hayes	1931–1933	24	6	14	4	0.333	2	11	4	0.235	—	—	—	—	0	0	—
15	Bo McMillin^{†}	1934–1947	122	63	48	11	0.561	34	34	6	0.500	—	—	—	—	1	0	—
16	Clyde B. Smith	1948–1951	36	9	26	1	0.264	4	19	0	0.174	—	—	—	—	0	0	—
17	Bernie Crimmins	1952–1956	45	13	32	0	0.289	6	24	0	0.200	—	—	—	—	0	0	—
18	Bob Hicks	1957	9	1	8	0	0.111	0	6	0	.000	—	—	—	—	0	0	—
19	Phil Dickens	1958–1964	63	20	41	2	0.333	8	34	2	0.205	—	—	—	—	0	0	—
20	John Pont	1965–1972	83	31	51	1	0.380	21	36	1	0.371	0	1	0	—	1	0	—
21	Lee Corso	1973–1982	111	41	68	2	0.378	27	53	2	0.341	1	0	0	—	0	0	—
22	Sam Wyche	1983	11	3	8	0	0.273	2	7	0	0.222	0	0	0	—	0	0	—
23	Bill Mallory	1984–1996	149	69	77	3	0.473	39	65	1	0.376	2	4	0	—	0	0	—
24	Cam Cameron	1997–2001	55	18	37	—	0.327	12	28	—	0.300	0	0	—	—	0	0	—
25	Gerry DiNardo	2002–2004	35	8	27	—	0.229	3	21	—	0.125	0	0	—	—	0	0	—
26	Terry Hoeppner	2005–2006	23	9	14	—	0.391	4	12	—	0.250	0	0	—	—	0	0	—
27	Bill Lynch	2007–2010	49	19	30	—	0.388	6	26	—	0.188	0	1	—	—	0	0	—
28	Kevin Wilson	2011–2016	73	26	47	—	0.356	12	37	—	0.245	0	1	—	0	0	0	—
29	Tom Allen	2016–2023	82	33	49	—	0.402	18	43	—	0.295	0	3	—	0	0	0	AFCA Coach of the Year Award (2020)
30	Curt Cignetti	2024–present	39	36	3	—	0.923	23	2	—	0.920	3	1	—	0	1	1	AFCA Coach of the Year Award (2024, 2025)
