= 1894 Wabash football team =

American college football season

1894 Wabash football
- Conference: Indiana Intercollegiate Athletic Association
- Record: 4–5 (2–3 IIAA)
- Head coach: A. Vernon Randall (1st season)
- Captains: Fry (full season); Stott (against Earlham)
- Home stadium: Philistine Field

1894 Indiana Intercollegiate Athletic Association football standings
	Conf.					Overall
Team	W		L		T	W		L		T
Purdue $	4	–	0	–	0	9	–	1	–	0
Butler	3	–	1	–	0	6	–	1	–	0
Wabash	2	–	3	–	0	4	–	5	–	0
Indiana	0	–	4	–	0	0	–	4	–	1
$ – Conference champion

The 1894 Wabash football team was an American football team that represented Wabash College as a member the Indiana Intercollegiate Athletic Association (IIAA) during the 1894 college football season. Led by A. Vernon Randall in his first and only season as head coach, Wabash compiled an overall record of 4–5 with a mark of 2–3 in conference play.

== Schedule ==
Date	Time	Opponent	Site	Result	Attendance	Source
September 29		at Elwood Club	Elwood, IN	W forfeit		
October 6	3:05 p.m.	Illinois*	Philistine Field; Crawfordsville, IN	L 6–36		
October 20	2:30 p.m.	at DePauw	Greencastle, IN	W 16–4	300+	
October 27	3:20 p.m.	Indiana	Crawfordsville, IN	W 46–0		
November 10		Purdue	Philistine Field; Crawfordsville, IN	L 0–44		
November 15	3:00 p.m.	at Notre Dame*	Brownson Hall field; Notre Dame, IN	L 0–30	200+	
November 17		at Indianapolis Light Artillery	East Ohio Street Baseball Park; Indianapolis, IN	L 12–38		
November 24	2:45 p.m.	at Butler	Baseball park; Indianapolis, IN	L 0–58	~500	
November 29	1:45 p.m.	at Earlham	Earlham Campus; Richmond, IN	W 12–8		
*Non-conference game

== Roster ==
1894 Wabash Roster
Quarterbacks: Huffer – every game besides Indiana and Earlham; Witherspoon – against Indiana; Sullivan – against Earlham; Right ends: Little – every game besides Earlham; Patterson – against Earlham; Left end: Dowdall – full season	Right tackles: Ashman – every game besides Notre Dame and Indianapolis Artillery; Hall – against Notre Dame and Indianapolis Artillery; Left tackle: Griest – full season; Right guard: Kern – full season; Left guards: Farrell – every game besides Purdue and Indianapolis Artillery; Bushnell – against Purdue; Rauch – against Indianapolis Artillery	Centers: Buchanan – against DePauw, Purdue, and Butler; Bushnell – against Indiana and Notre Dame; Rauch – against Earlham and Illinois; Randall – against Indianapolis Artillery; Right half backs: Wynckoop – against DePauw, Indiana, Purdue, and Indianapolis Artillery; Stott – against Butler and Illinois; Randall – against Notre Dame; Huffer – against Earlham; Left half backs: Stott – every game besides Butler, and Illinois; Allen – against Butler and Illinois; Fullback: Fry (Captain) – full season
