= A. Vernon Randall =

American football coach

Biographical details
- Education: Wabash (1891)

Coaching career (HC unless noted)
- 1894: Wabash

Head coaching record
- Overall: 4–5

A. Vernon "Sheepy" Randall was an American college football coach. He was the ninth head football coach at Wabash College in Crawfordsville, Indiana, serving for one season, in 1894, and compiling a record of 4–5.

== Head coaching record ==
Year	Team	Overall	Conference	Standing	Bowl/playoffs
Wabash (Indiana Intercollegiate Athletic Association) (1894)
1894	Wabash	4–5	2–3		
Wabash:		4–5	2–3		
Total:		4–5			
