= 1894 Purdue Boilermakers football team =

American college football season

1894 Purdue Boilermakers football
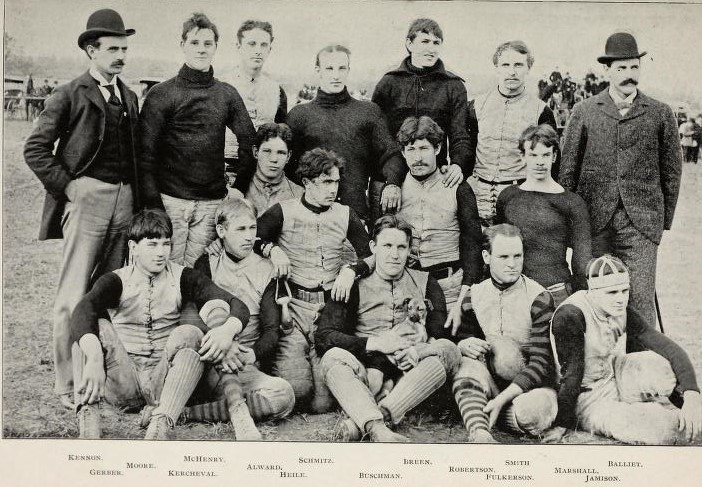

IIAA champion
- Conference: Indiana Intercollegiate Athletic Association
- Record: 9–1 (4–0 IIAA)
- Head coach: D. M. Balliet (2nd season)
- Captain: A. L. Fulkerson
- Home stadium: Stuart Field

1894 Indiana Intercollegiate Athletic Association football standings
	Conf.					Overall
Team	W		L		T	W		L		T
Purdue $	4	–	0	–	0	9	–	1	–	0
Butler	3	–	1	–	0	6	–	1	–	0
Wabash	2	–	3	–	0	4	–	5	–	0
Indiana	0	–	4	–	0	0	–	4	–	1
$ – Conference champion

The 1894 Purdue Boilermakers football team was an American football team that represented Purdue University during the 1894 college football season. The team compiled a 9–1 record and outscored its opponents by a total of 188 to 36 in its second season under head coach D. M. Balliet. A. L. Fulkerson was the team captain.

== Schedule ==
Date	Opponent	Site	Result	Attendance	Source
October 6	Indianapolis Light Artillery*	Stuart Field; West Lafayette, IN	W 6–4		
October 13	at Butler	Ohio Street grounds; Indianapolis, IN	W 30–0		
October 15	Wisconsin*	Stuart Field; West Lafayette, IN	W 6–0 (forfeit)		
October 20	Armour Institute*	Stuart Field; West Lafayette, IN	W 36–0		
October 27	at Minnesota*	Athletic Park; Minneapolis, MN	L 0–24	2,500	
November 3	at Chicago*	Marshall Field; Chicago, IL (rivalry)	W 10–6		
November 10	at Wabash	Crawfordsville, IN	W 44–0		
November 17	at Illinois*	Illinois Field; Champaign, IL (rivalry)	W 22–2		
November 24	at Indiana	Jordan Field; Bloomington, IN (rivalry)	W 6–0 (Note: Purdue claims 6 points in recent Media Guides, but other sources award Purdue 1 point for this forfeit.) (forfeit)		
November 29	vs. DePauw	Fair grounds; Indianapolis, IN	W 28–0		
*Non-conference game

== Roster ==
- A. F. Alward, T
- Bill Bunnell, E
- Harry Bushman, HB-QB
- A. L. Fulkerson, C-G
- Dwight Gerber, T-QB
- Charles Heile, G
- Alpha Jamison, HB-FB-QB
- Joe Kerchival, G
- Cloyd Marshall, E-FB
- Ben McHenry, E
- William Moore, HB
- C. H. Robertson, T-G-C
- C. A. Schmitz, HB-FB
- L. C. Smith, T
- L. B. Webb, G
