= 1891 Indiana Hoosiers football team =

American college football season

1891 Indiana Hoosiers football
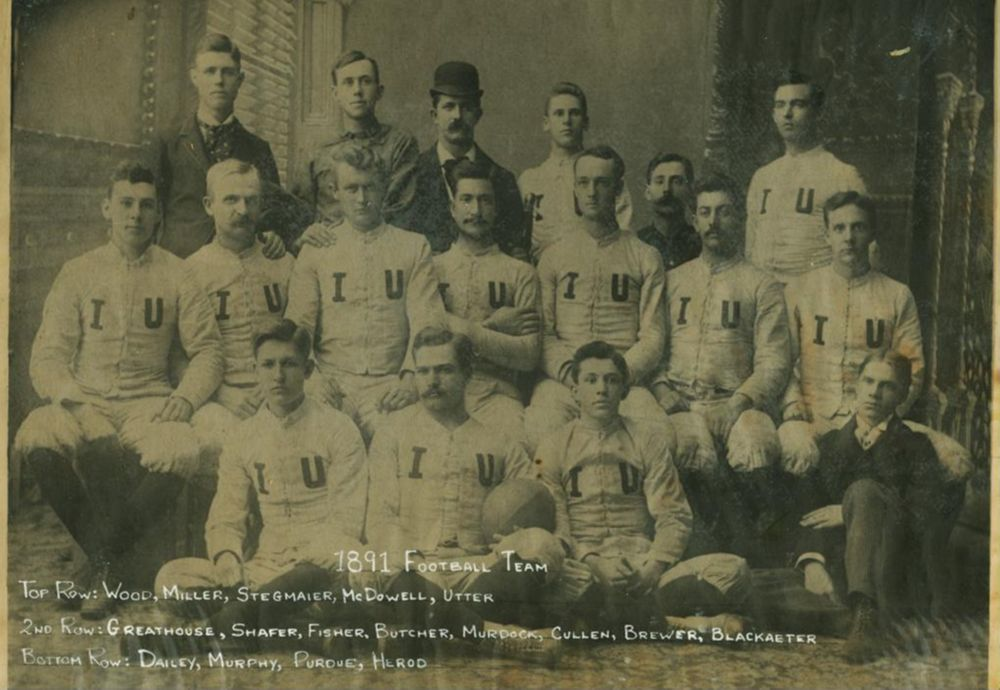
- Conference: Indiana Intercollegiate Athletic Association
- Record: 1–5 (0–5 IIAA)
- Head coach: Joseph R. Herod (1st season)
- Captain: John Shafer
- Home stadium: Indiana University Athletic Field

1891 Indiana Intercollegiate Athletic Association football standings
	Conf.					Overall
Team	W		L		T	W		L		T
Purdue $	4	–	0	–	0	4	–	0	–	0
Butler	3	–	2	–	0	4	–	3	–	0
Wabash	1	–	3	–	0	1	–	3	–	0
Indiana	0	–	5	–	0	1	–	5	–	0
$ – Conference champion

The 1891 Indiana Hoosiers football team was an American football team that represented Indiana University Bloomington during the 1891 college football season. In Indiana's fourth season of intercollegiate football, Joseph R. Herod served as the school's football coach. Indiana played six games and compiled a 1–5 record. The team's 34–0 victory over the Louisville Athletic Club was the first in the history of the Indiana University football program.

== Schedule ==
Date	Time	Opponent	Site	Result	Attendance	Source
October 17	3:00 p.m.	Wabash	Indiana University Athletic Field; Bloomington, IN	L 0–28		
October 24	3:00 p.m.	at Butler	State fair grounds; Indianapolis, IN	L 6–52	600–700	
October 31	2:30 p.m.	DePauw	Indiana University Athletic Field; Bloomington, IN	L 4–62		
November 7	3:00 p.m.	at Butler	State fair grounds; Indianapolis, IN	L 6–26		
November 14		at Purdue	West Lafayette, IN (rivalry)	L 0–60	1,200	
January 9, 1892		Louisville Athletic Club*	Louisville, KY	W 34–0	150	
*Non-conference game

== Personnel ==
=== Roster ===
Name	Pos.
Harry McDowell	
Samuel K. Murdock	
Fisher	
John Shafer (C)	
Utter	
Charles A. Greathouse	
James Henry Cullen	
C. Roland Perdue	
Blackaeter	
Murphy	
Kenneth W. Brewer	
Stegmaier	
Miller	
Butcher	
Wood	
Frank C. Dailey	
Walter Hottel	
