= 1894 Indiana Hoosiers football team =

American college football season

1894 Indiana Hoosiers football
- Conference: Indiana Intercollegiate Athletic Association
- Record: 0–4–1 (0–4 IIAA)
- Head coach: Gustave Ferbert & Joseph R. Hudelson (1st season)
- Captain: Kenneth Brewer
- Home stadium: Jordan Field

1894 Indiana Intercollegiate Athletic Association football standings
	Conf.					Overall
Team	W		L		T	W		L		T
Purdue $	4	–	0	–	0	9	–	1	–	0
Butler	3	–	1	–	0	6	–	1	–	0
Wabash	2	–	3	–	0	4	–	5	–	0
Indiana	0	–	4	–	0	0	–	4	–	1
$ – Conference champion

The 1894 Indiana Hoosiers football team was an American football team that represented Indiana University as a member of the Indiana Intercollegiate Athletic Association (IIAA) during the 1894 college football season. Coached by Gustave Ferbert and Joseph R. Hudelson, Indiana compiled an overall record of 0–4–1. Kenneth Brewer, who played at tackle, was the team's captain.

== Schedule ==
Date	Opponent	Site	Result	Source
October 6	at Louisville Athletic Club*	Louisville, KY	T 0–0	
October 13	at DePauw	Greencastle, IN	L 10–20	
October 27	at Wabash	Philistine Field; Crawfordsville, IN	L 0–46	
November 3	Butler	Bloomington, IN	L 0–58	
November 24	Purdue	Athletic Field; Bloomington, IN (rivalry)	L 0–1 (forfeit)	
*Non-conference game

== Personnel ==
=== Roster ===
Name	Position	Year
John A. Shafer	Right Guard	
Hence Irwin Orme		
Hunter		
William B. Mumford	Fullback	
Daniel W. Sheek	Substitute	
Ora Herkless	Left End	
Carl E. Endicott	Right Tackle	
Jones	Substitute	
Werter D. Dodd		
Preston E. Eagleson	Left Halfback	Junior
J. J. Mitchell	Left Guard	
Kenneth Brewer (C)	Left Tackle	
Guy Harland Fitzgerald	Manager	
A. G. McGregor	Center	
Harry W. McDowell	Right Halfback	
Winston Menzies	Full Back	
Frank L. Gass	Right End	
Normal V. Patterson	Right Halfback	
William A. Denny	Quarterback	
Charles L. Hunt		
Smith	Substitute	
Taylor	Right Halfback	
Sam Murdock	Right Tackle	

=== Staffing ===
- Gustave Ferbert, Coach
- Joseph R. Hudelson, Coach
