= Scott Dolson =

Director of Athletics at Indiana University

- Born: Michigan City, Indiana, U.S.
- Education: BA, management, O'Neill School of Public and Environmental Affairs
- Employer(s): Tim Knight Enterprises; Indiana University
- Spouse: Heidi

Scott Dolson is the Vice President and Director of Intercollegiate Athletics at Indiana University.

== Early life ==
Dolson was born and raised in Michigan City, Indiana, where he attended Rogers High School. Following high school, Dolson graduated from the O'Neill School of Public and Environmental Affairs with a bachelor's degree in management. While an undergraduate, Dolson was encouraged by Delray Brooks, his high school friend who played one season and part of a second for the Hoosiers, to become a student manager for the Indiana Hoosiers men's basketball team. He served in this role for four seasons and became the program's head manager in 1988.

== Career ==
Following graduation, Dolson worked for Tim Knight Enterprises before returning to Indiana University in December 1989. While serving as director of IU's Varsity Club in 2008, Dolson was tapped to replace Fred Glass as IU's deputy director and chief operating officer of intercollegiate athletics. In March 2020, he was appointed President and Director of Intercollegiate Athletics at IU.

== Personal life ==
Dolson is married to Heidi, the special projects manager for the IU Alumni Association. They share five children; Luke, Sam and Zach Wisen, and Kristen and Nick Dolson.
