= 1894 Indianapolis Light Artillery football team =

American football team

1894 Indianapolis Light Artillery football
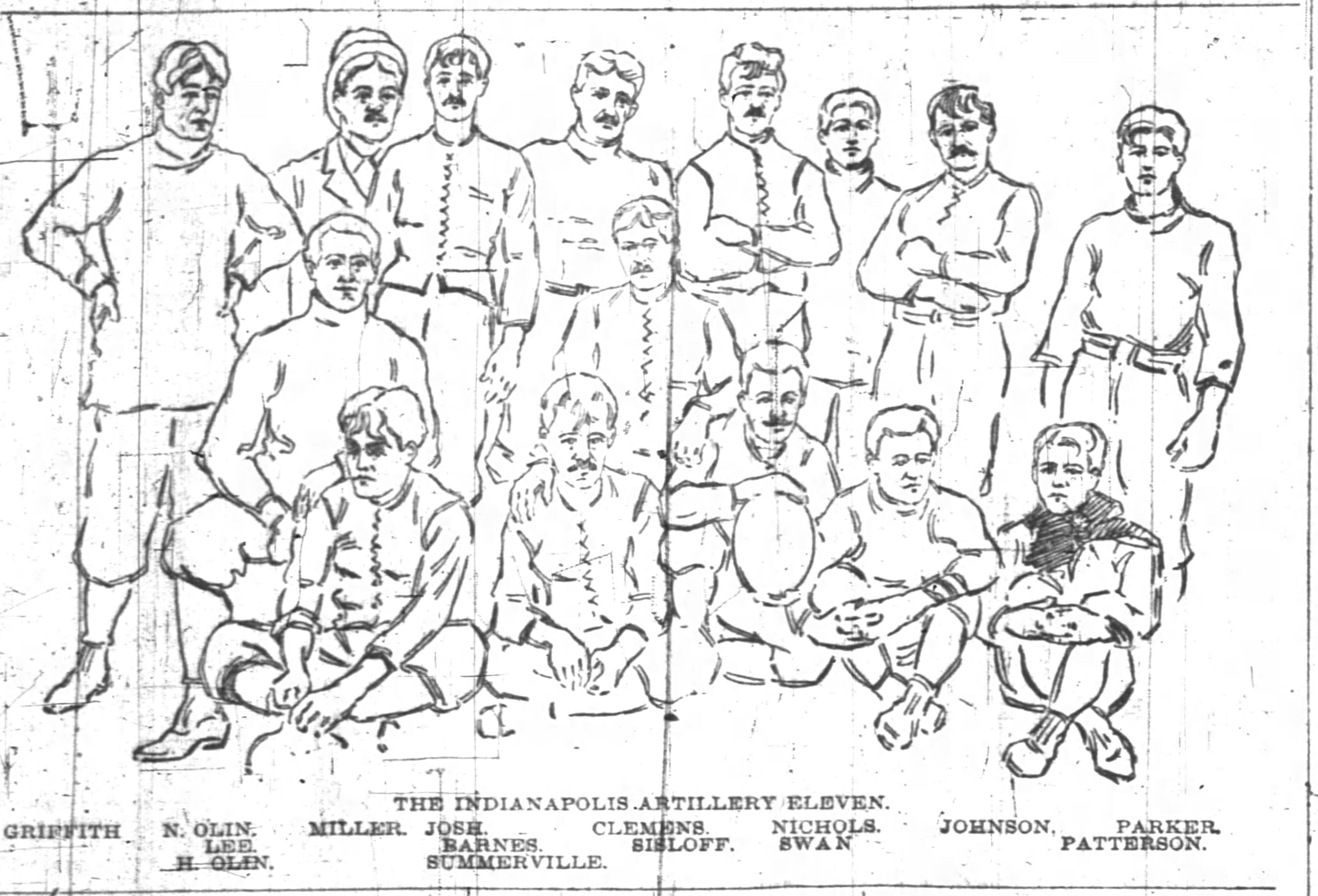
- Drawing of "The Indianapolis Artillery Eleven"" from The Indianapolis News, October 5, 1894
- Conference: Independent
- Record: 4–2
- Head coach: Rufus M. Barnes
- Home stadium: East Ohio Street Baseball Park

The 1894 Indianapolis Light Artillery football team was an American football team that represented the Indianapolis Light Artillery as an independent during the 1894 college football season. In its first year of competition, the team compiled a 4–2 record in games against the region's college and university teams, including a victory over Illinois and a loss to Purdue. The 1895 team went on to defeat Notre Dame, 18–0, in South Bend.

The team played its three 1894 home games at the baseball park on East Ohio Street in Indianapolis.

During the fall of 1894, when the unit fielded its first football team, the Indianapolis Light Artillery was seeking to pay off its debt resulting from the construction of a $15,000 armory at Mississippi and Seventh Streets in Indianapolis. The unit engaged in fund-raising efforts featuring infantry drill teams and zouaves looking "very natty in their bright uniforms."

While all players on the 1894 team were reportedly members of the artillery unit, that practice changed, such that the 1896 team included only four or five artillerymen. In October 1896, the team was prohibited from continuing to use the Indianapolis Light Artillery name.

== Schedule ==
Date	Opponent	Site	Result	Source
September 28	at Butler	Butler campus; Indianapolis, IN	W 10–0	
October 6	at Purdue	Stuart Field; West Lafayette, IN	L 4–6	
October 27	DePauw	East Ohio Street Baseball Park; Indianapolis, IN	W 46–5	
November 17	Wabash	East Ohio Street Baseball Park; Indianapolis, IN	W 38–12	
November 24	Illinois	Illinois Field; Champaign, IL	W 18–14	
November 29	Butler	East Ohio Street Baseball Park; Indianapolis, IN	L 4–6	

== Players and coaches ==
Rufus M. Barnes (1870–1943) was the team captain and played at the tackle position. Barnes also coached the 1894 Light Artillery team. He had previously been captain of the University of Pennsylvania crew.

Other players included:

- Alfred H. Sommerville at right halfback (Sommerville died in May 1896 in an industrial fire.);
- Sam Patterson at left halfback;
- John Nichol at fullback;
- George Cullom at quarterback.
- Frank Clemmens at center;
- Edward B. Johnson at guard;
- Stetson Parker at guard;
- Harold M. Joss at tackle;
- Harry Griffith at end; and
- Harry Olin at end.

Swan was the manager.
