= Joseph R. Herod =

American college football coach, diplomat (1868–1908)

- Herod pictured in Vicennial Record of the Class of 1891 in Yale College (1912)

Biographical details
- Born: October 8, 1868; Columbus, Indiana, U.S.
- Died: August 13, 1908 (aged 39); Indianapolis, Indiana, U.S.

Coaching career (HC unless noted)
- 1891: Indiana

Head coaching record
- Overall: 1–5

Joseph Rogers "Billy" 'Herod (October 8, 1868 – August 13, 1908) was an American college football coach, diplomat, and broker. He served as the head football coach at Indiana University—now known as Indiana University Bloomington—for one season, in 1891, compiling a record of 1–5. Herod worked in the American foreign service from 1893 to 1901. His 1901 book, Favored Nation Treatment, an Analysis of the Most Favored Nation Clause, with Commentaries on its Use in Treaties of Commerce and Navigation, became an official reference for the U.S. foreign service.

== Early life, education, and football coaching ==
Herod was born on October 8, 1868, in Columbus, Indiana, to William Wirt Herod, a prominent lawyer of Indianapolis, and Susan C. Rogers. He moved as a child to Indianapolis, where he attended public schools and prepped for college at the Classical School. Herod entered Yale University in 1887, graduating with a Bachelor of Arts degree in 1891. For two years after graduating from Yale, he read law in the office of A. C. Harris. In the fall of 1891, Herod came from Chicago to Bloomington, Indiana to coach football team at Indiana University—now known as Indiana University Bloomington. He led the 1891 Indiana Hoosiers football team to a record of 1–5 and the first victory in the history of the Indiana Hoosiers football program.

== Foreign service and business career ==
In 1893, Herod was appointed by Benjamin Harrison as secretary of the legation in Tokyo. He was promoted to first secretary by Grover Cleveland. Herod was in charge of American affairs in Seoul, and when he resigned from diplomatic service in 1901, he was offer a job as legal advisor to the Empower of Korea. Instead, he moved to New York City, where he went into the brokerage business. Herod earned a Master of Arts degree from Yale, in 1895, or his work in international relations. In 1901, his book, Favored Nation Treatment, an Analysis of the Most Favored Nation Clause, with Commentaries on its Use in Treaties of Commerce and Navigation, was published. The book was officially adopted as a reference for the U.S. foreign service.

== Illness, death, and family ==
In 1908, Herod became ill at his country home in New Canaan, Connecticut. After several weeks of illness, went to visit his brother, William Pirtle Herod, in Indianapolis, where his health declined rapidly. Herod died of gastritis, on August 13, 1908, at Sterne's Sanitarium, in Indianapolis.

Herod married Annette Vernor Atchison, on November 12, 1893, in Tokyo. Atchison was a native of Detroit. The couple had a son, William Pirtle Herod Jr., born on November 3, 1894, in Tokyo.

== Head coaching record ==
| Year | Team | Overall | Conference | Standing | Bowl/playoffs |
|---|---|---|---|---|---|
Indiana Hoosiers (Indiana Intercollegiate Athletic Association) (1891)
| 1891 | Indiana | 1–5 | 0–5 | | |
| Indiana: | | 1–5 | 0–5 | | |
| Total: | | 1–5 | | | |
