= Joseph R. Hudelson =

American football player and coach (1871–1944)

Biographical details
- Born: October 8, 1871
- Died: December 16, 1944 (aged 73); Chicago, Illinois, U.S

Playing career
- 1892–1893: Purdue
- 1895: Northwestern
- 1895: Chicago Athletic Association
- Positions: End, halfback, quarterback

Coaching career (HC unless noted)
- 1894: Indiana

Head coaching record
- Overall: 0–4–1

Joseph Russell Hudelson (October 8, 1871 – December 16, 1944), sometimes referred to as J. R. Hudelson or J. R. Huddelson, was an American football player and coach. He served as the co-head football coach with Gustave Ferbert at Indiana University—now known as Indiana University Bloomington—for one season in 1894, compiling a record of 0–4–1. A native of Owensville, Indiana, Hudelson attended Purdue University, where he played halfback and quarterback from 1892 to 1893. He also played for Northwestern University in 1895 and at end for the 1895 Chicago Athletic Association football team.

Hudelson died on December 16, 1944, at his home in Chicago.

== Head coaching record ==
Year	Team	Overall	Conference	Standing	Bowl/playoffs
Indiana Hoosiers (Indiana Intercollegiate Athletic Association) (1894)
1894	Indiana	0–4–1	0–4		
Indiana:		0–4–1	0–4		
Total:		0–4–1			
