= Gustave Ferbert =

American football player and coach (1873–1943)

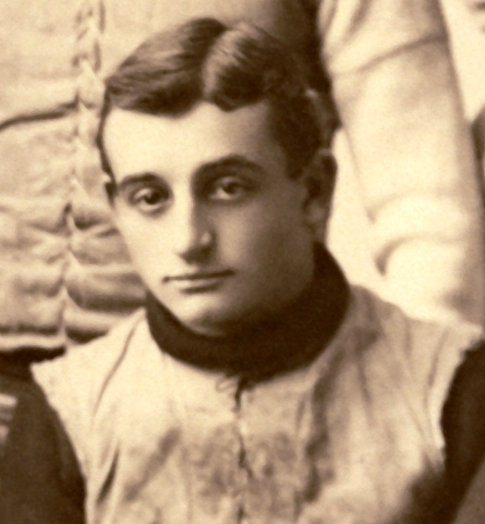

Biographical details
- Born: July 22, 1873; Cleveland, Ohio, U.S.
- Died: January 15, 1943 (aged 69); Cleveland, Ohio, U.S.

Playing career
- 1893–1896: Michigan
- Positions: Halfback, end

Coaching career (HC unless noted)
- 1894: Indiana
- 1897–1899: Michigan

Head coaching record
- Overall: 24–7–2

Accomplishments and honors

Championships
- 1 Western Conference (1898)

Gustave Herman Ferbert (July 22, 1873 – January 15, 1943), nicknamed "Dutch", was an American college football player and coach. He was first a player from 1893 to 1896 and then the head football coach from 1897 to 1899 at the University of Michigan. His 1898 Michigan team went 10–0 and won the first Western Conference (now known as the Big Ten Conference) championship in the school's history. Ferbert compiled a record of 24–3–1 as head coach of the Michigan Wolverines football team. He was also co-head football coach with Joseph R. Hudelson at Indiana University for one season, in 1894, while still a student at Michigan.

Ferbert left the University of Michigan in 1900 and spent nine years prospecting for gold in Alaska, finally striking it rich off claims he discovered in 1908 and 1909.

== Early life ==
Ferbert was born in 1873, in Cleveland, to John C. Ferbert and Caroline Striebinger.

== University of Michigan football player ==
Ferbert played quarterback and right halfback for the University of Michigan from 1893 to 1896. During the four years Ferbert played, the Michigan team compiled an overall record of 33–4–1. In his senior year, the 1896 Michigan Wolverines football team went 9–1, winning its first nine games by a combined score of 256 to 4. However, the team lost the final game of the season to Chicago, 7–6, in a game played indoors at the Chicago Coliseum. The newspapers reported that Pingree was the "whole thing" for Michigan in the first half, though Ferbert took his place in the second half and was "equally effective." The game was played in front of 15,000 enthusiasts in the same building in which William Jennings Bryan had been nominated for the presidency just five months earlier, and the game was "one of the most desperately contested games ever played Chicago." Neither team resorted to trick plays, "both relying on straight, hard football." Toward the end of the second half, it got very dark, and "the spectators were treated to a novelty in the shape of a football by electric light."

In December 1896, Febert was unanimously selected as the captain of Michigan's 1897 football team. One newspaper reported on the selection as follows:

"'Dutchy,' as Ferbert is almost universally called by his college fellows, has been as popular as any man who ever played on one of Michigan's teams, and his election meets the favor of every one. Ferbert began his career as a football player in the Ann Arbor high school team ... He began playing on the varsity in '93 at end, but in the Purdue game of that year, on account of an injury to one of the regular backs, Ferbert was put in back of the line, and no one has been able to run him out of his position. During a majority of the time he has played on the team he has acted as field captain, and his splendid judgment has been largely instrumental in Michigan's success on the gridiron."

In 1894, Ferbert was also co-coach with Joseph R. Hudelson of the football team at Indiana University Bloomington at Indiana University—now known as Indiana University Bloomington. The 1894 Indiana Hoosiers football team compiled a record of 0–4–1.

== University of Michigan football coach ==
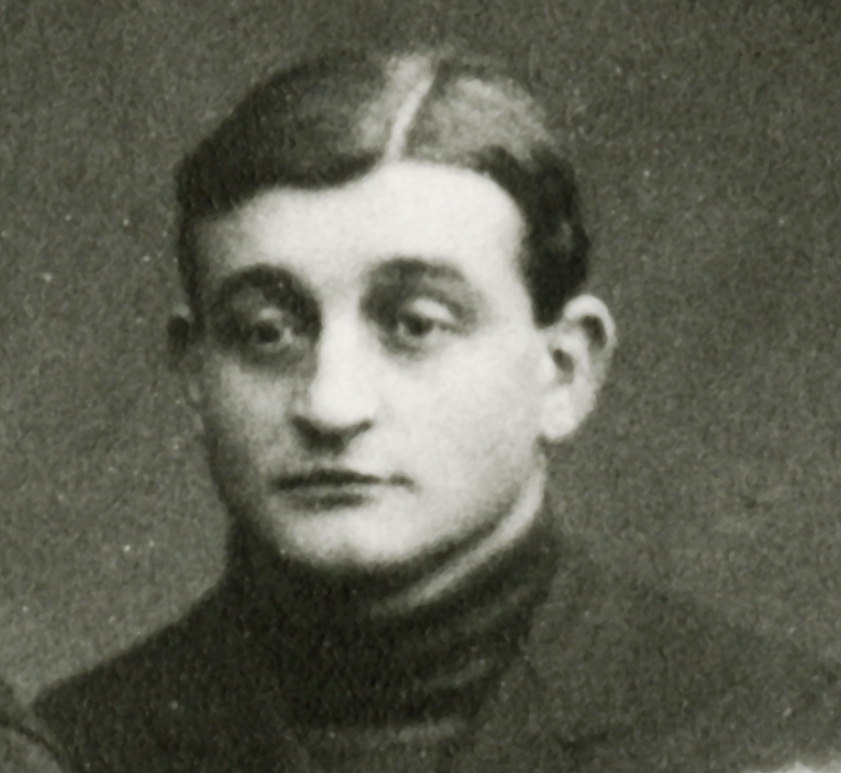
Gustave Ferbert

After his graduation, Ferbert was named as Michigan's head football coach at age 22.

=== The 1897 season and the first Ohio State game ===
In 1897, Ferbert's team was 6–1–1 and finished third in the Western Conference. Ferbert's team played to a scoreless tie against an Ohio Wesleyan team coached by Fielding H. Yost.

Ferbert was Michigan's head coach in the first match in The Michigan-Ohio State Game. On October 16, 1897, the teams met at Regents Field in Ann Arbor, where Michigan won, 34–0. The Michigan Daily reported: "Michigan had no trouble in defeating the Ohio State University representatives in Saturday's game. Two halves of 20 and 15 minutes respectively were played and the score was 34-0." All the scoring took place in the first half, and the score would have been much worse if Ferbert had wanted to run up a higher score.

=== "Champions of the West" in 1898 ===
The 1898 Wolverines went 10–0 and won the Western Conference (now known as the Big Ten Conference) championship. The first great Michigan football team, the 1898 group outscored its opponents 205 to 26. In the first meeting with what would become Michigan State, Michigan prevailed 39–0, and they also shut out Notre Dame, 23–0. The team finished the season traveling to Chicago for a final game against Amos Alonzo Stagg's University of Chicago team on November 24, 1898. Led by All-American center, William Cunningham, Michigan came out on top, 12–11, for its first Western Conference championship.

A newspaper account described Michigan's victory this way: "The western football championship goes to Michigan. On a field that was simply perfect for fast football, and before a crowd of 12,000 the maroons of Chicago went down before the maize and blue of Michigan today by a score of 12 to 11. . . . The Michigan line, in which big holes were torn by the light Northwestern team, was simply impregnable today, with the exception of about ten minutes in the second half, when the Chicago men pushed their opponents aside with an apparent ease."

Another article noted: "Michigan, with the exception of one or two double passes, relied almost altogether on straight football, line bucking and runs around the end. Chicago, on the contrary, used trick plays throughout but the team work was of a high order, as shown by both teams."

During Ferbert's three-year tenure as Michigan's head football coach, his teams were 24–3–1, a winning percentage of .875. From 1898 to 1899, his Michigan teams had a 16-game winning streak.

== Gold prospecting in Alaska ==
After his coaching career at Michigan, Ferbert went to Alaska to search for gold. In May 1900, amid the Klondike Gold Rush, newspapers reported that Ferbert had left Ann Arbor for Seattle, where he planned to join "High" Allen and "Count" Villa, described as "two other prominent Michigan football men." Ferbert, Allen and Villa intended to "proceed to the Alaska gold fields," leaving unsettled the question of who would coach the Michigan football team in 1900.

For a considerable period of time, Ferbert was out of contact in the Klondike, but he emerged on the Seward Peninsula. An article published in 1909 after his return reported that Ferbert had struck it rich. The article stated: "Eight years ago, with the determination to come back rich or not at all, 'Dutch' Ferbert, old Michigan coach and one of the most famous football players, left Cleveland for the Klondike. For eight years he has toiled over endless snows, fought fierce hardships, endured everything in his battle to win his word—to come back home a rich man. And now he has made a strike and is coming back to civilization. He sailed from Nome and is rushing homeward with $1,000,000 as his reward."

Another article reported on Ferbert's $1,000,000 "Touchdown in the Arctic." The article reported that Ferbert's parting words were that he would return rich or not at all. Ferbert made a "killing," the report continued, near Doering City in the Candle Creek region in 1908 and 1909, and "it is reported that his claims are valuable enough to put him in the millionaire class." Before striking it rich, Ferbert spent several years prospecting in several districts with "slim success." He worked part-time in restaurants and stores, but he finally located some of the best claims in the region and "panned out more gold than he had ever dreamed of and became a bonanza king overnight."

Modern historians however are not necessarily convinced of these claims. James Tobin in particular argues that the claims of mining success may have been vastly overstated.

== Later life ==
When Ferbert returned from Alaska, he practiced as a mining engineer and consultant until his retirement in 1928. In a draft registration card submitted in September 1918, Ferbert indicated he was living in Seattle, Washington, and was employed as a carpenter. At the time of the 1920 United States census, he was living in Whittier, California, and his occupation was listed as a miner in a private mine.

Ferbert's brother, A. H. Ferbert, was the president of the Pittsburgh Steel Co. Ferbert moved to Cleveland in approximately 1942, where he lived with his brother. Ferbert died at age 69, on January 15, 1943, of a heart ailment, coronary thrombosis, in Cleveland.

== Head coaching record ==
Year	Team	Overall	Conference	Standing	Bowl/playoffs
Indiana Hoosiers (Indiana Intercollegiate Athletic Association) (1894)
1894	Indiana	0–4–1	0–4		
Indiana:		0–4–1	0–4		
Michigan Wolverines (Western Conference) (1897–1899)
1897	Michigan	6–1–1	2–1	3rd	
1898	Michigan	10–0	3–0	1st	
1899	Michigan	8–2	1–1	T–3rd	
Michigan:		24–3–1	6–2		
Total:		24–7–2			
National championship Conference title Conference division title or championship game berth
