= Madison G. Gonterman =

American lawyer

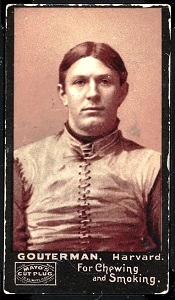

Biographical details
- Born: February 8, 1871; Princeton, Illinois, U.S.
- Died: September 30, 1941 (aged 70); Cambridge, Massachusetts, U.S.

Playing career
- 1893–1895: Harvard
- Position: Halfback

Coaching career (HC unless noted)
- 1896–1897: Indiana
- 1899: Knox (IL)

Administrative career (AD unless noted)
- 1897–1898: Indiana

Head coaching record
- Overall: 15–8–2

Madison Gillham Gonterman (February 8, 1871 – September 30, 1941) was an American college football player and coach, athletics administrator, and lawyer. He served as the head football coach at Indiana University from 1896 to 1897 and at Knox College in Galesburg, Illinois in 1899, compiling a career head coaching record of 15–8–2. Replacing Edgar Syrett, Gonterman was also Indiana University's second athletic director, serving from 1897 to 1898. He was succeeded by James H. Horne in 1898. Gonterman graduated from Harvard Law School in 1899. He later acted as counsel in Massachusetts for the United States Railroad Administration.

== Head coaching record ==
Year	Team	Overall	Bowl/playoffs
Indiana Hoosiers (Independent) (1896–1897)
1896	Indiana	5–3	
1897	Indiana	6–1–1	
Indiana:		11–4–1	
Knox Old Siwash (Independent) (1899)
1899	Knox	4–4–1	
Knox:		4–4–1	
Total:		15–8–2	
