= Arthur B. Woodford =

American economist and university professor

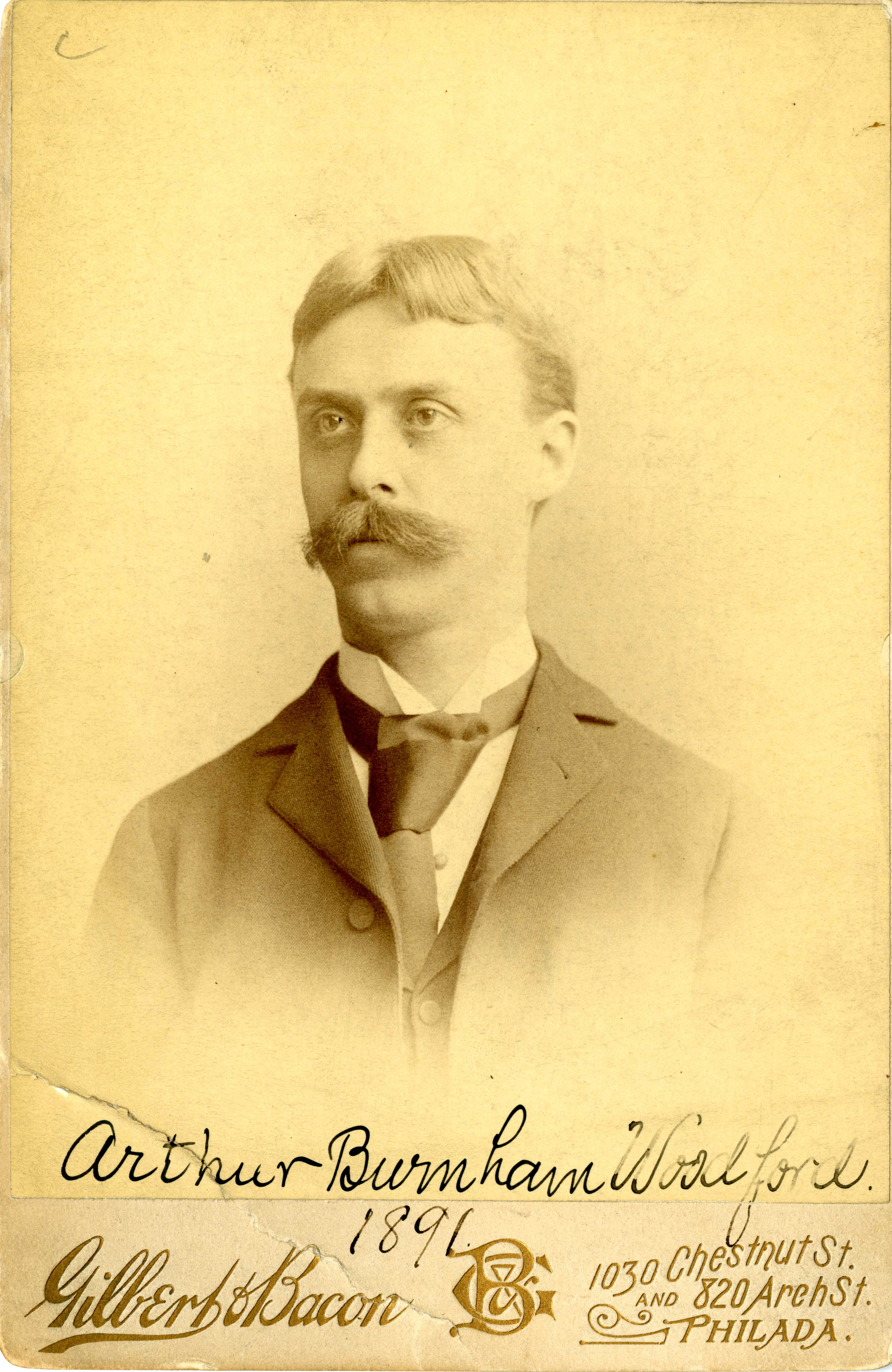
- In 1892

Biographical details
- Born: October 7, 1861; Winsted, Connecticut, U.S.
- Died: November 3, 1946 (aged 85); New Haven, Connecticut, U.S.

Coaching career (HC unless noted)
- 1887–1888: Indiana

Head coaching record
- Overall: 0–1–1

Arthur Burnham Woodford (October 7, 1861 – November 3, 1946) was an American economist, university professor, college football coach, and grammar school rector. He was the first head coach of the Indiana Hoosiers football team, holding that position from 1887 to 1888.

== Early life and education ==
Woodford was born in Winsted, Connecticut, on October 7, 1861. His parents were John Woodford and Sarah Burnham Woodford. He attended public schools and Williston Seminary before entering Yale University as an undergraduate. He graduated from Yale's Sheffield Scientific School in 1881 with a Bachelor of Philosophy degree. Woodford continued his education as a post-graduate at Yale, the University of Michigan, the Johns Hopkins University, Indiana University, l'École Libre des Sciences Politiques in Paris, and at Berlin University. He received a Master of Arts degree from Indiana University in 1886 and a Doctor of Philosophy degree from Johns Hopkins in 1891.

== Professional career ==
Woodford worked as a special agent for the United States Department of Labor in 1885. From 1885 to 1889, he held a professorship in economics at Indiana University. Teaching at Indiana in 1885, Woodford was the first instructor in the United States to carry an official title containing the word "sociology." Woodford also served as the first head football coach at Indiana University, coaching the Indiana Hoosiers football team for two seasons, from 1887 to 1888, and compiling a record of 0–1–1.

In 1890, Woodford briefly held a chair—vacated by the death of its holder, Alexander Johnson—in political economy and jurisprudence at Princeton College, but future Princeton and United States president Woodrow Wilson was appointed to the chair for the academic year 1890–91. Moving to the Wharton School of the University of Pennsylvania, Woodford served there as an assistant professor of political economy from 1891 to 1892. From 1892 to 1896, he taught English and economics while serving as president of the School of Social Economics in New York City. He lectured at New York University (NYU) from 1895 to 1898. In 1896 he also took up a post as an instructor at the Hopkins Grammar School. In 1906, he became rector at Hopkins.

== Family and death ==
Woodford married Margaret Cornelia Bowditch of New Haven, Connecticut in 1885. They had three children, Francis Bowditch Woodford, Burnham Bowditch Woodford, and Margaret Bowditch Woodford.

Woodford died on November 3, 1946, at New Haven Hospital in New Haven. He had been ill after a fall at his home two weeks earlier.

== Publications ==
On the Use of Silver as Money in the United States: An Historical Study, 1893
The Economic Primer, 1895

== Head coaching record ==
Year	Team	Overall	Conference	Standing	Bowl/playoffs
Indiana Hoosiers (Independent) (1887–1888)
1887	Indiana	0–1			
1888	Indiana	0–0–1			
Indiana:		0–1–1			
Total:		0–1–1			
