= Bob Hicks (American football) =

American football player and coach (1921–2012)

Biographical details
- Born: July 12, 1921; Hazleton, Pennsylvania, U.S.
- Died: November 24, 2012 (aged 91); Bloomington, Indiana, U.S.

Playing career
- 1947: Tennessee
- Position: Center

Coaching career (HC unless noted)
- 1953–1956: Wyoming (assistant)
- 1957: Indiana (interim HC)
- 1958–1972: Indiana (assistant)

Head coaching record
- Overall: 1–8

Robert Bruce Hicks (July 12, 1921 – November 24, 2012) was an American football player and coach. He served as the head football coach at Indiana University for one season in 1957, compiling a record of 1–8.

Hicks was born on July 12, 1921, in Hazleton, Pennsylvania. He attended Hazleton High School, where he played football and basketball before earning a football scholarship from the University of Tennessee. Hicks died on November 24, 2012.

== Head coaching record ==
Year	Team	Overall	Conference	Standing	Bowl/playoffs
Indiana Hoosiers (Big Ten Conference) (1957)
1957	Indiana	1–8	0–6	9th	
Indiana:		1–8	0–6		
Total:		1–8			
