= Indiana Hoosiers football =

Football team of Indiana University Bloomington

| 2026 Indiana Hoosiers football team |
- First season: 1887; 139 years ago
- Athletic director: Scott Dolson
- Head coach: Curt Cignetti; 3rd season, 36–4 (.900)
- Location: Bloomington, Indiana
- Stadium: Memorial Stadium (capacity: 53,524)
- Field: Merchants Bank Field
- NCAA division: Division I FBS
- Conference: Big Ten
- Colors: Crimson and cream
- All-time record: 534–721–46 (.428)
- CFP record: 3–1 (.750)
- Bowl record: 6–11 (.353)

National championships
- Claimed: 2025

National finalist
- CFP: 2025

College Football Playoff appearances
- 2024, 2025

Conference championships
- Big Ten: 1945, 1967, 2025
- Heisman winners: Fernando Mendoza – 2025
- Consensus All-Americans: 9
- Rivalries: Purdue (rivalry); Illinois (rivalry); Michigan State (rivalry); Kentucky (rivalry)

Uniforms
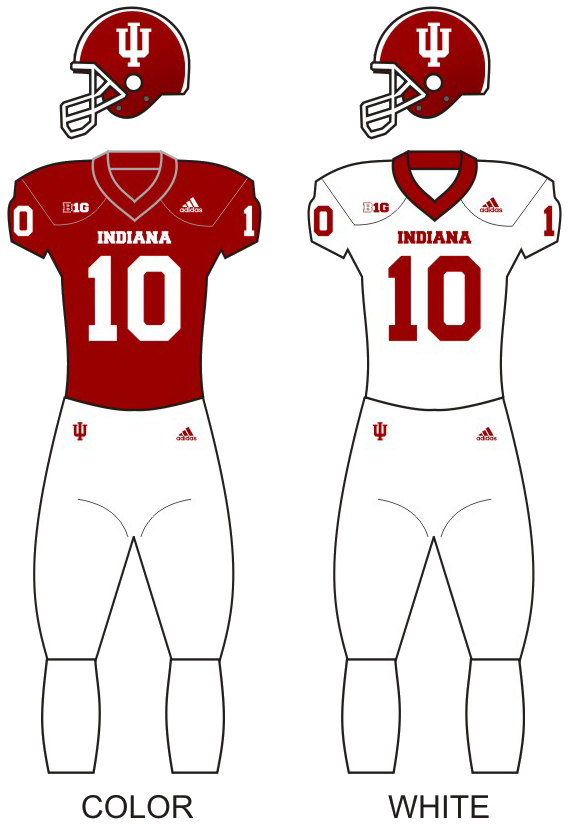
- Fight song: "Indiana, Our Indiana"
- Mascot: Hoosier the Bison
- Marching band: Marching Hundred
- Outfitter: Adidas
- Website: iuhoosiers.com

The Indiana Hoosiers football program represents Indiana University Bloomington in NCAA Division I Football Bowl Subdivision college football (FBS) and in the Big Ten Conference. The Hoosiers have played their home games at Memorial Stadium in Bloomington, Indiana, since 1960.

The Hoosiers have won the Big Ten Championship three times, doing it first in 1945, again in 1967, and most recently in 2025. Indiana has appeared in 17 bowl games, including the 1968 and 2026 Rose Bowl games. Long considered one of the weaker power-conference programs in the conference and the country, with the second-worst win percentage of any power conference school as of 2026, (Note: The only Power 5 school with a worse win percentage than Indiana is Wake Forest University.) Indiana has shifted its fortunes in recent years, having reached the College Football Playoff in the 2024 and 2025 seasons, the latter of which included the Hoosiers' second-ever undefeated regular season and first national championship in program history. Six Indiana players have been inducted into the College Football Hall of Fame, including Zora Clevenger, Bill Ingram, Pete Pihos, George Taliaferro, John Tavener, and Anthony Thompson, who was also National Player of the Year in 1989. The Hoosiers are currently led by head coach Curt Cignetti.

== History ==
=== Early history (1887–1957) ===
In the fall of 1884 the Indiana student newspaper made its first reference to football by reporting that a team was being organized. In 1885 (a year later), a Yale graduate, professor Arthur B. Woodford, came to Indiana to teach political and social science and during 1886 he introduced football to the school. Indiana played one game in 1886, a 14–8 loss to Butler on October 30. Woodford coached the Hoosiers from 1887 to 1888. In the only documented game of the 1889 season, Indiana lost to Wabash College, 40–2. Evans Woollen coached the Hoosiers and the team had an 0–1 record.

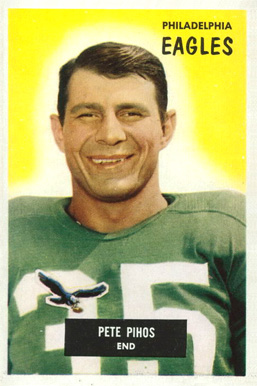
Hall of Fame WR Pete Pihos played for the Hoosiers 1942–43 and 1945–46

In 1891, Joseph R. Herod, who graduated from Yale University that year, coached the team. 1892 saw IU's first intercollegiate African-American athlete take the field. Preston Eagleson, a 16-year old freshman who played Right Half Back for the Hoosiers, was described as "phenomenal" by sports reporters. The Hoosiers continued to struggle to find wins, even forfeiting a game to in-state rival Purdue in the 1894 season. The first winning season came in 1895 under coach Dana Osgood, who led the team to a 4–3–1 record. There were two winning seasons in 1896 and 1897 under coach Madison G. Gonterman, who was hired away from Harvard. After coaching the Hoosiers to winning records in 1898 and 1899, coach James H. Horne and the football team joined the Western Conference (later the Big Ten Conference). Horne led Indiana to six .500-or-better records in his seven years. In 1905 coach James M. Sheldon took over and would have the longest tenure of a football coach at Indiana until Bo McMillin coached for 14 years (1934–1947). Sheldon proved to be one of the most successful coaches in Indiana football's early years, leading the Hoosiers to four winning seasons and as high as third in the Big Ten Conference rankings. In 1914 Indiana hired its first full-time coach, Clarence Childs, but continued to struggle to find success. In 1922 construction began on the original Memorial Stadium. It would seat 22,000 fans and $250,000 was raised to erect the new facility. The new stadium was built on the grounds of the golf course and replaced Jordan Field, which had been the home of Indiana football since 1887.

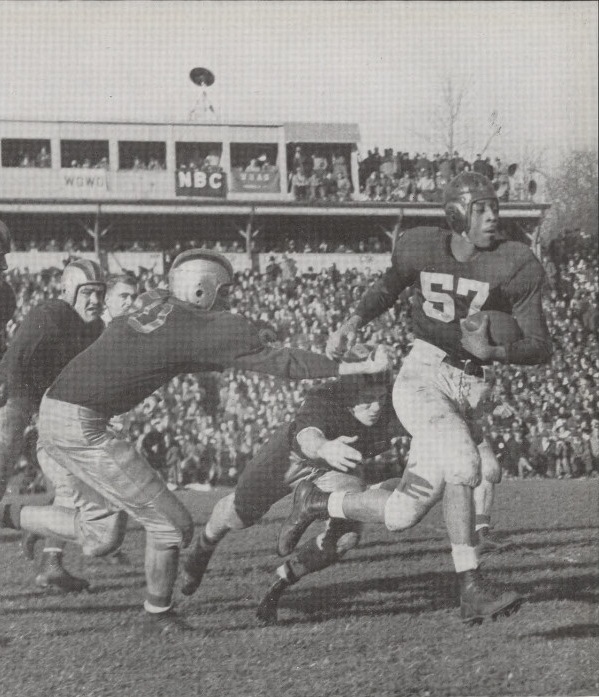
Mel Groomes running with ball against Purdue in 1945

Bo McMillin was the first head coach to lead Indiana football to an outright Big Ten Championship. In 1945, the Hoosiers achieved their only unbeaten season (9–0–1) before 2025. The achievement earned Coach McMillan the title of Man of the Year (by the Football Writers Association) and Coach of the Year (by the Football Coaches Association). Part of the team's success in this period is attributable to George Taliaferro, an African-American who helped break down color barriers in sports and played for the Hoosiers two years before Jackie Robinson suited up for the Brooklyn Dodgers. A three-time All-American, Taliaferro led the Hoosiers in rushing twice, punting in 1945 and passing in 1948. He helped lead the 1945 undefeated team. Under Coach McMillin, IU had 10 winning seasons, including a stretch of six consecutive years. His Big Ten record of 34–34–6 is the second best of any Indiana coach, as is his overall winning percentage (.562). His overall record at IU is 63–48–11. On September 23, 1946, McMillin was named Indiana's athletic director. Clyde Smith left Wisconsin La-Crosse and came to the Hoosiers as head football coach following McMillin's retirement. The Hoosiers struggled mightily under Smith, as they failed to win more than three games in a single season with Smith at the helm. Smith's final record at IU is 8–27–1. Bernie Crimmins came to Indiana from his post as an assistant under legendary coach Frank Leahy at Notre Dame and brought along high hopes that IU football prominence would be restored. However, it didn't happen. Like his predecessor, Crimmins failed to win more than three games in a single season, with yearly records of 2–7, 2–7, 3–6, 3–6 and 3–6 for a final record of 13–32 in five seasons. Crimmins was fired as head coach and returned to Notre Dame as an assistant. Bob Hicks came to Indiana from his post as an assistant at Wyoming. He took over the Hoosiers football program for one season while Phil Dickens was being investigated for alleged NCAA violations. He went 1–8 in his only season as head coach, failing to win a single Big Ten game. He returned to his post as assistant coach for the Hoosiers after Dickens was reinstated.

=== Phil Dickens era (1958–1964) ===
Coach Phil Dickens, formerly head football coach at Wyoming, guided Indiana to a fifth-place finish in the Big Ten and a 3–2–1 overall record in 1958, his first season at the helm (he sat out the 1957 season while under investigation by the NCAA). That same year construction began on the new Memorial Stadium, which is still the home of the football team today. In the fall of 1960 the Indiana football program was hit with devastating NCAA sanctions. The sanctions resulted from violations that included the offering of free plane tickets to several athletes along with financial stipends, according to an NCAA report, while other recruits were delivered envelopes filled with cash. Indiana denied the charges, arguing that possible recruiting violations were just the work of overzealous alumni. The NCAA, however, didn't buy the claims and saddled Indiana with four years of probation. During this time all Hoosier varsity sports were barred from postseason play. The NCAA also disallowed any Indiana win during the 1960 Big Ten season because of Indiana's improper recruiting practices. The sanctions were a stain on Indiana's notoriously clean record and undermined the ability to convince talented athletes to come to Bloomington. However, Dickens was not held responsible for the sanctions and remained on the Hoosier sidelines for another five years until 1964. Dickens' contract was not renewed after seven seasons.

=== John Pont era (1965–1972) ===
John Pont, who came to IU from Yale, took over just as the IU sanctions expired. In 1966 the team achieved only a 1–8–1 record. But the following season, in 1967, Indiana surprisingly had a 9–2 record and shared the Big Ten title with Minnesota and Purdue. The team was invited to and accepted the invitation to play in the 1968 Rose Bowl (Indiana's first appearance; their second would come 58 years later in 2026), but lost to Southern California, the team which would be named national champions. Pont was named unanimous national coach of the year and head coach of the East team in the 1968 Coaches All-America game. With sophomore stars Harry Gonzo, John Isenbarger and Jade Butcher returning for two more years, the Hoosiers were ranked in the preseason top 10 nationally in 1968. Unfortunately, due to injuries and to the return to prominence of programs at Ohio State, Michigan and Purdue, the Hoosiers finished 6–4 in 1968 and 4–6 in 1969 (also partially due to a 14-player African American team boycott). Pont, after only winning five or more games in a single season twice after the Rose Bowl season (never more than six wins), was asked to resign after eight seasons.

=== Lee Corso era (1973–1982) ===
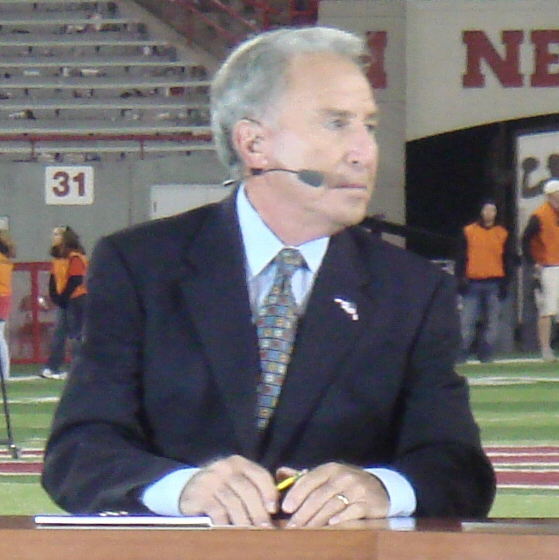
Coach Lee Corso 2008

Lee Corso left Louisville and took over as IU head football coach in 1973, leading the Hoosiers to two winning seasons in 1979 and 1980. The 1979 regular season ended with 7–4 record and earned a trip to the 1979 Holiday Bowl; there the Hoosiers would beat the previously unbeaten BYU. Indiana's victory over the Cougars propelled the team to 16th in the UPI poll, the Hoosiers' first top-20 ranking since 1967. During one game in the 1976 season, Corso called a time out after his team scored a touchdown early in the 2nd quarter. The entire team huddled together for a photograph with the scoreboard filling the background. It read: Indiana 7, Ohio State 6. It was the first time in 25 years that the Hoosiers had led the Buckeyes in a football game. Corso's record was 41–68–2 over his ten years at Indiana. Corso was fired after ten seasons in which, other than the Holiday Bowl season, the Hoosiers only had one winning season, a 6–5 1980 season.

=== Sam Wyche era (1983) ===
For one season, Sam Wyche, formerly an assistant with the NFL's San Francisco 49ers, led the Indiana Hoosiers football program. Wyche's Hoosiers struggled to a 3–8 record in his only season at the helm of the Hoosiers. He left IU to accept an offer to become head coach of the NFL's Cincinnati Bengals.

=== Bill Mallory era (1984–1996) ===
Bill Mallory, who came to IU from Northern Illinois University, took over as head football coach after Wyche's departure. Although he finished with a winless 0–11 record during his first campaign at Indiana in 1984, it would take Mallory just three seasons to lead the Hoosiers to their first bowl appearance under his direction. Indiana finished with a 6–5 regular-season record in 1986 and capped its season by playing a talented Florida State team in the 1986 All-American Bowl on New Year's Eve. Despite losing 27–13, the Hoosiers put up a good fight. Indiana running back Anthony Thompson, who was playing in his first bowl game, finished with 127 rushing yards on 28 carries. In 1987, Mallory became the first Big Ten coach to be awarded back-to-back coach of the year honors after the Hoosiers earned an 8–4 record (with wins over Ohio State and Michigan), a second-place finish in the Big Ten, and a Peach Bowl appearance against Tennessee. In what was the first-ever meeting between the schools, Tennessee was victorious by a final score of 27–22. In 1988, Indiana finished the regular season with a 7–3–1 record, a 5–3 mark in the Big Ten, and a top-20 ranking. It earned the team a postseason berth for the third consecutive year with a game against the University of South Carolina in the 1988 Liberty Bowl. The Hoosiers dominated the game and cruised to a 34–10 victory before 39,210 fans. Indiana set a Liberty Bowl record with 575 yards of total offense. Indiana finished with a 6–4–1 regular-season record in 1990, a mark good enough to earn the Hoosiers a berth in the Peach Bowl for a game against Auburn which Indiana would lose 27–23. Part of Indiana's success can be attributed to star running back Vaughn Dunbar. In 1991 Indiana played in the Copper Bowl and dominated a highly regarded Baylor University team 24–0. Led by future NFL quarterback Trent Green, it was one of the most impressive performances by any team during the 1991 bowl season. Indiana finished the 1993 season with an 8–4 record, with two of its three regular season losses by seven points or less. The team played in the 1993 Independence Bowl. Coach Mallory, despite his successes, was fired after thirteen seasons, ending his career at Indiana with six bowl games overall in 13 seasons. He is Indiana's all-time winningest head football coach with 69 wins.

=== Cam Cameron era (1997–2001) ===
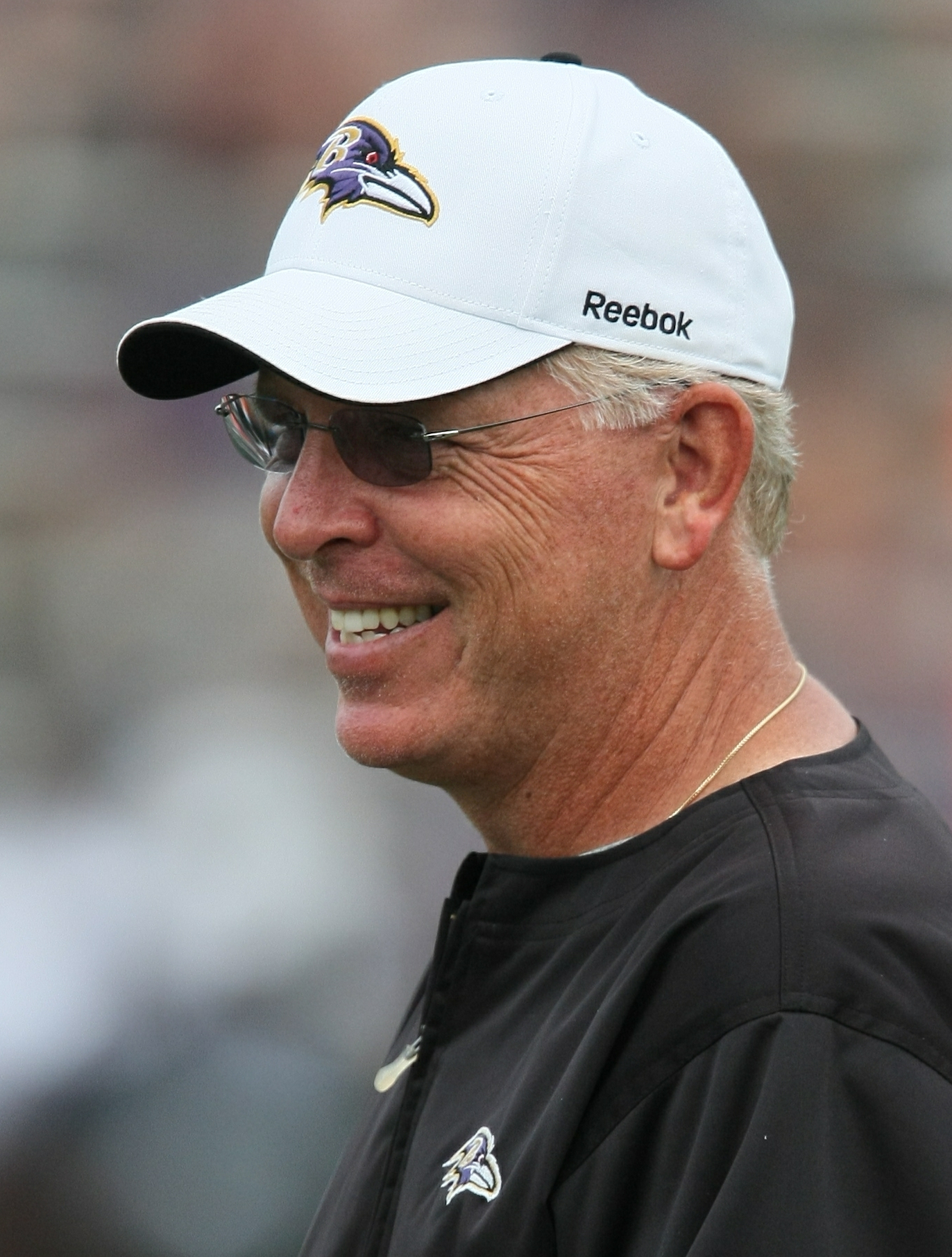
Coach Cameron

Washington Redskins quarterbacks coach and Indiana alumnus Cam Cameron began coaching the Hoosiers in 1997 and in five seasons compiled a record of 18–37. Cameron brought a new system and logo to the school, both in style and in substance. Cameron began by introducing a new oval logo for the football helmets (which has since been discarded). Cameron brought an explosive offense to school with highly effective offensive players such as Antwaan Randle El. Indiana averaged 23.6 points per game under Cameron's guidance. In fact, Randle El became the first player in NCAA Division I history to pass for 40 career touchdowns and score 40 career rushing touchdowns. He finished his college career as fifth on the all-time NCAA total yardage list, and became the first player in college football history to record 2,500 total yards for each of four consecutive years. Although Cameron's Indiana teams won less than one-third of their games, Indiana was recognized by the American Football Coaches Association for its exemplary football graduation rates in each of Cameron's final four seasons. Nevertheless, Cameron was fired after the 2001 season.

=== Gerry DiNardo era (2002–2004) ===
In 2002, former Vanderbilt University and LSU head football coach Gerry DiNardo took over as Indiana head football coach. The Hoosiers posted a 3–9 overall record. They were 1–7 in Big Ten Conference play, tied for last with Northwestern.

Dinardo's Hoosiers also struggled during the 2003 season, registering a slightly worse standing than 2002. The Hoosiers turned in a 2–10 overall record with a 1–7 conference standing, good for second to last in the Big Ten. Coach Dinardo later remarked that his players needed to be better organized in the offseason. Additionally, despite the losing record, that "the 2003 Hoosiers were probably the closest team he's been around".

Indiana didn't fare any better under DiNardo's tutelage in 2004. The Hoosiers ended up 3–8 overall, posting another 1–7 Big Ten standing that left them tied for last with the University of Illinois. At the conclusion of the 2004 season, DiNardo's fate was sealed. He finished with just an 8–27 overall record. He never won more than three games in a season, and was fired after the 2004 season.

=== Terry Hoeppner era (2005–2006) ===
In 2005 Terry Hoeppner ("Coach Hep") left Miami University and was named head coach of the Hoosiers. He quickly made an impact by nearly leading the team to a bowl appearance in 2006. With 49 true or redshirt freshmen and 72 underclassmen overall, that team was the youngest team in the Big Ten. Despite such youth, the team garnered five victories, the most since the 2001 season. The 2006 Hoosiers picked up three Big Ten wins for the first time since 2001.

Coach Hep rejuvenated the Indiana fan base; attendance increased 39 percent, season ticket sales increased 46 percent, and student season ticket sales increased 110 percent. In 2006, Hoeppner announced he was taking a medical leave of absence but died shortly afterward following a lengthy battle with brain cancer. Hoeppner's final record at IU was 9–14.

=== Bill Lynch era (2007–2010) ===
In 2007, Hoeppner's offensive coordinator Bill Lynch, a native Hoosier, took over the reins of the program. In his first season Lynch led Indiana to a 7–6 record (the most wins since 1993) and its first Old Oaken Bucket victory since 2001. The success earned the team a trip to the Insight Bowl. The season marked the first time that an Indiana coach guided a team to a bowl game in his first season.

The 2008 Indiana team was hampered by a number of injuries. Against Wisconsin, the Hoosiers were forced to play three quarterbacks and four centers. 13 starters in total were injured during the year. Still, Lynch was able to pull in one of the strongest recruiting classes in recent history. There was marked improvement on the field in 2009, although the record ledger failed to show it as the team took 4th quarter leads into three Big Ten road games before falling short.

During Lynch's tenure, the players established a Player's Leadership Council, which elect weekly game captains and select the community service organizations the team volunteers with. The Boys and Girls Club of Bloomington and Riley Children's Hospital of Indianapolis are two favorite causes of the team. Lynch's tenure has been noted for his strong recruiting and identifying and developing high character young men who want to be part of a family atmosphere. However, after four seasons, Lynch compiled just a 19–30 overall record and was fired by athletic director Fred Glass.

=== Kevin Wilson era (2011–2016) ===
On December 7, 2010, Oklahoma offensive coordinator Kevin Wilson was named head coach of the Hoosiers. Despite no prior college head coaching experience, Wilson arrived in Bloomington with ties to the Midwestern United States from his years as an assistant coach at Miami (OH) and Northwestern under Randy Walker. Additionally, Wilson had a reputation as a brilliant offensive mind, having overseen explosive offenses during his years with the Sooners that set school records. Wilson, who won the 2008 Broyles Award as the nation's top assistant coach, also helped coach and develop Heisman Trophy winning quarterback Sam Bradford during his time with the Sooners. When he was hired by IU, Wilson signed a seven-year contract worth $1.2 million annually excluding incentives. When he arrived, Wilson installed a spread offense identical to the system he ran at Oklahoma.

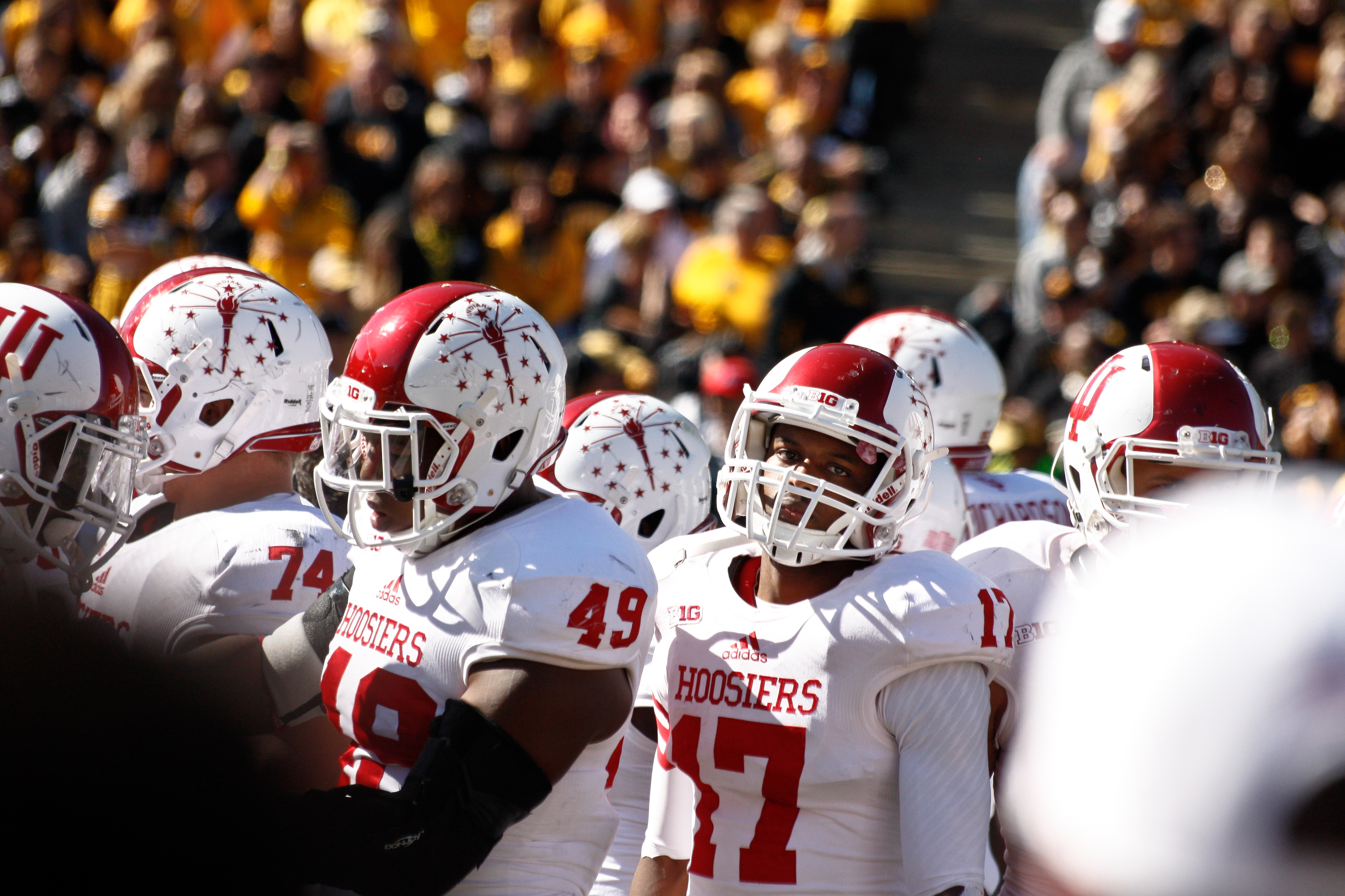
Indiana players during a homecoming game on October 11, 2014, against the University of Iowa

In Wilson's first year, the Hoosiers compiled a 1–11 record. In his second year, Indiana improved to 4–8 on the year (4 losses were by seven points or fewer), but surpassed Northwestern's record for most losses in Football Bowl Subdivision history.

Nevertheless, Wilson's team exhibited an explosive offense, going from 80th nationally in pass offense to 19th and leading the Big Ten with 311.2 yards per game, in spite of losing the starting quarterback Tre Roberson in the season's second game. Additionally, Wilson was successful in luring five 4-star Rivals.com recruits from the 2013 class to Indiana, the most in school history.

Wilson's 2013 team improved to 5–7, and while the Hoosiers featured one of the Big Ten's more potent offenses (ranked 2nd in the Big Ten for 2013), the team's defense was among the conference's worst (12th in the Big Ten). The Hoosiers set school and Big Ten records for most yards and points allowed per game, and the Hoosiers lost three games in which they scored at least 35 points. Wilson fired defensive coordinator Doug Mallory following the 2013 season and replaced him with Brian Knorr, the former defensive coordinator of Wake Forest and former head coach at Ohio. After going 6–6 overall (2–6 B1G) in the 2015 season, Wilson's Hoosiers would qualify for a bowl game, the first since 2007. The Hoosiers would eventually lose the Pinstripe Bowl to Duke by a score of 44–41 in overtime. After the 2015 post season, on January 16, 2016, Wilson hired Tom Allen, the former defensive coordinator of USF, to replace Knorr beginning the 2016 season. On January 11, 2016, IU and Kevin Wilson agreed to terms on a six-year contract extension and raise.

After the end of the 2016 regular season, the Hoosiers would again finish 6–6 overall (4–5 B1G) to become bowl eligible for the second year in a row. This was the first time since 1990–1991 that the Hoosiers have gone to back-to-back bowl games. However, Wilson resigned as head coach on December 1, 2016, amidst "philosophical differences" with athletic director Fred Glass and allegations of player mistreatment. He later went on to be the offensive coordinator for the Ohio State Buckeyes football program, under head coach Urban Meyer.

Despite failing to achieve a winning record in six seasons with the Hoosiers, Wilson led IU to two bowl game appearances and oversaw explosive offenses that set IU school records. In Wilson's last 5 seasons as head coach for the Indiana Hoosiers, his offenses led the Big Ten Conference in passing yards per game (226.7 yards), were second in total yards per game (459.3 yards), third in points per game (31.4 points), and fourth in rushing yards per game (192.7 yards).

=== Tom Allen era (2016–2023) ===
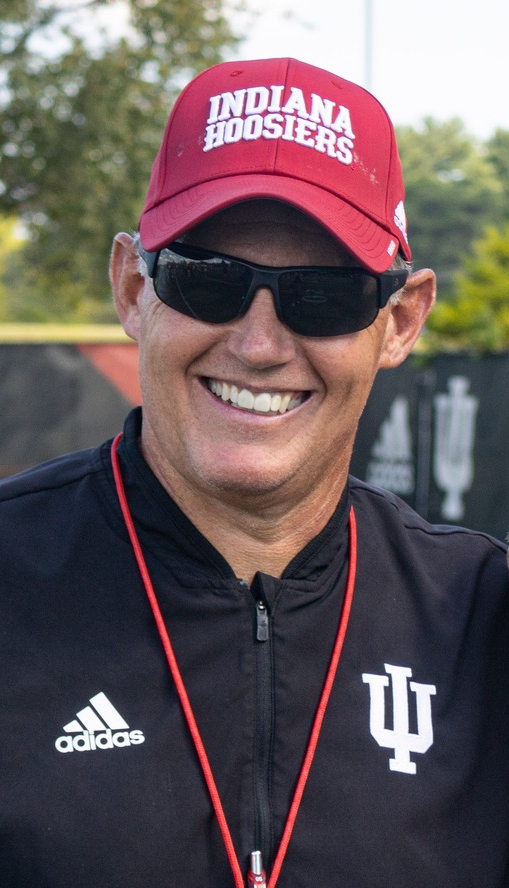
Former head coach Tom Allen

On December 1, 2016, Hoosiers defensive coordinator Tom Allen was promoted to head coach, replacing Kevin Wilson. On December 7, the IU football team was invited to play in the Foster Farms Bowl on December 28, 2016, at Levi's Stadium against the Utah Utes. The bowl game served as Tom Allen's head coaching debut. On January 4, 2017, former Tennessee offensive coordinator Mike DeBord was hired to the same position for the Hoosiers.

On August 3, 2017, ESPN's College GameDay announced that its first show of the season would be in Bloomington, for the first time. On September 9, 2017, Allen had his first win as the head coach of the Hoosiers, defeating the Virginia Cavaliers, in Charlottesville, by a score of 34–17. After the loss at Purdue on November 25, 2017, Allen and the Hoosiers would finish the 2017 season 5–7 overall and fail to earn a bowl appearance.

After the culmination of the 2018 season for Indiana, Allen's Hoosiers would again finish the season 5–7 overall; Indiana failed to beat archrival Purdue in a must-win, last game of the season, to become bowl eligible. The loss to the Boilermakers would secure the Hoosiers' second-straight year without a bowl appearance.

On December 27, 2018, the Hoosiers announced the promotion of Kane Wommack from linebackers coach to defensive coordinator. On December 30, 2018, Hoosiers' offensive coordinator Mike DeBord announced his retirement from football. On January 21, 2019, former Fresno State offensive coordinator Kalen DeBoer was announced as the Hoosiers' new offensive coordinator.

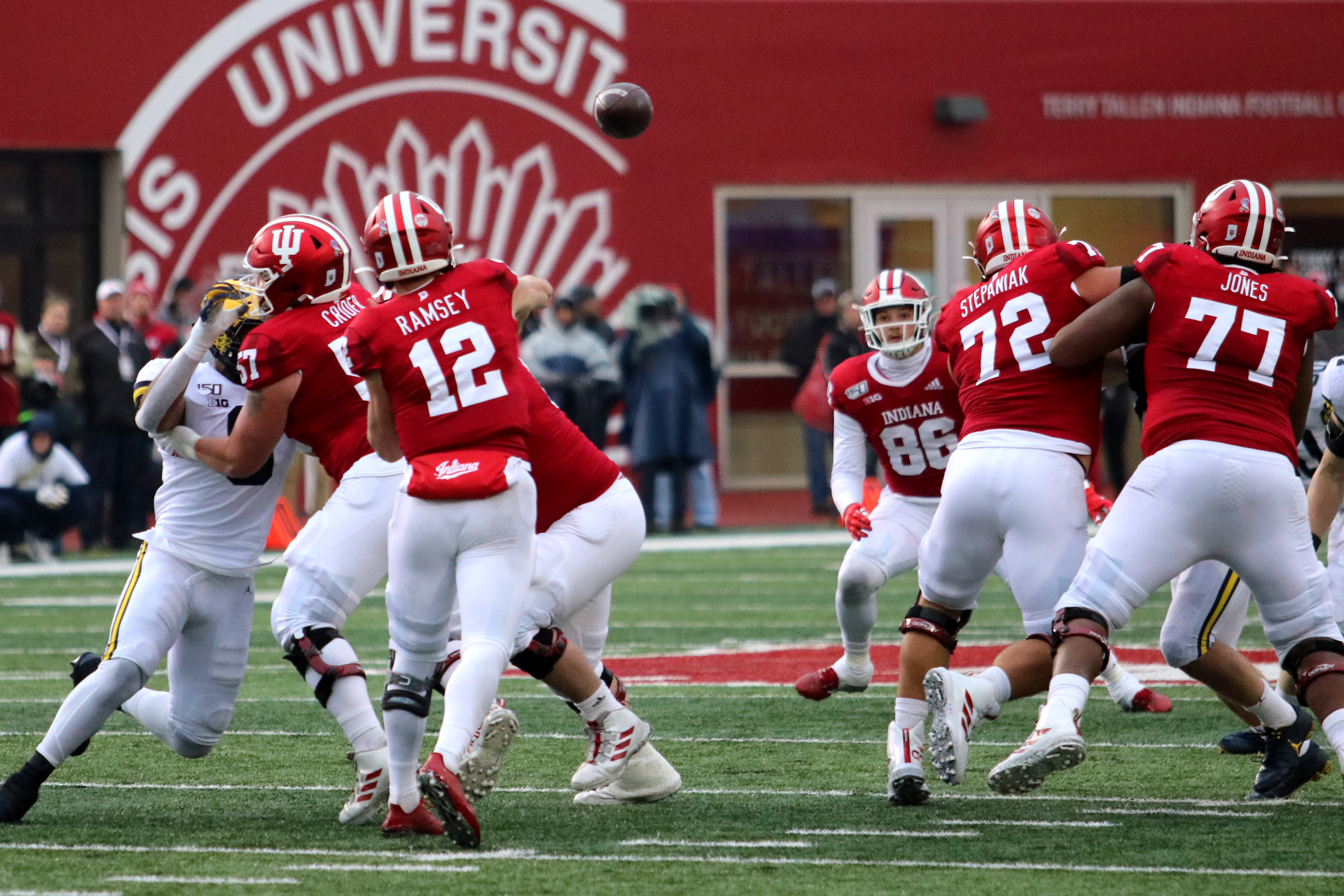
In-game action during a November 2019 matchup with Michigan

The Hoosiers would finish the 2019 regular season with an 8–4 overall record (5–4 Big Ten) and become bowl eligible by October 26; the 8–4 overall season record had not been accomplished since Indiana's 1993 season. On November 30, 2019, the Hoosiers defeated in-state rival Purdue 44–41, in two overtimes, to win the Old Oaken Bucket for the first time since 2016. On December 8, 2019, Indiana was selected as a participant in the 2020 Gator Bowl against Tennessee; the Hoosiers then lost 22–23 to the Volunteers.

After the culmination of the regular season, both Allen and DeBoer would receive watchlist nominations for their respective Coach of the Year awards, including DeBoer being named a semifinalist for the Broyles Award. On December 17, 2019, Kalen DeBoer was hired by Fresno State as its newest head coach; DeBoer had served only one year as the Hoosiers' offensive coordinator. Following the departure of DeBoer to Fresno State, Indiana announced the promotion of tight ends' coach Nick Sheridan to offensive coordinator and running backs' coach Mike Hart to associate head coach. On December 6, 2019, Tom Allen received a new seven-year contract worth $3.9 million annually excluding incentives.

Indiana's first game of the 2020 season took place at Memorial Stadium on October 24, 2020, against the No. 8 Penn State Nittany Lions. The Hoosiers defeated Penn State 36–35 in overtime. The Hoosiers were awarded a ranking of No. 17 following the victory. Indiana's next two games included a 37–21 victory over the Rutgers Scarlet Knights and a 38–21 victory over the No. 23 Michigan Wolverines, their first victory over them in 33 years. After the win versus the Wolverines, the Hoosiers were ranked tenth in both the AP and coaches poll, their highest rankings since 1969 and 1992.

After the regular season was over, the Hoosiers were invited to the Outback Bowl, losing by six points to Ole Miss, 26–20. After the season concluded, defensive coordinator Kane Wommack would leave to become head coach of the South Alabama Jaguars. Indiana would hire Charlton Warren from the Georgia Bulldogs to replace him.

On March 8, 2021, IU and Tom Allen agreed to terms on another new seven-year contract that came with a $1 million annual raise. The new deal made Allen the 18th highest paid head college football coach in the country. After finishing the 2021 season with a 2–10 overall (0–9 Big Ten) record, Indiana fired offensive coordinator Nick Sheridan on November 28, 2021. The Hoosiers hired former UMass head coach Walt Bell as Sheridan's replacement on December 9, 2021.

The Hoosiers finished the 2022 season 4–8 overall (2–7 Big Ten), ending up second to last in the Big Ten East, just ahead of Rutgers. Indiana continued to languish under Allen in its 2023 campaign. On September 23, 2023, Indiana barely eked out a 29–27 victory in 4 overtimes over the Akron Zips, themselves a struggling team that finished its season 2–10 overall. The Hoosiers wound up 3–9 overall (1–8 Big Ten), good for last in the Big Ten East and the worst all around Big Ten record.

On November 26, 2023, IU fired Tom Allen as head coach after three straight losing seasons. This was a day after the Hoosiers concluded the 2023 season with a 3–9 record, its third consecutive losing season.

After the solid 2020 season, Allen was unable to sustain the momentum generated during that season and the Hoosiers struggled on the football field thereafter. Allen and IU agreed to a reduced $15.5 million buyout when Allen was terminated, the most money the Hoosiers have ever paid a fired football coach in its history and the fourth largest buyout paid in college football history.

=== Curt Cignetti era (2024–present) ===
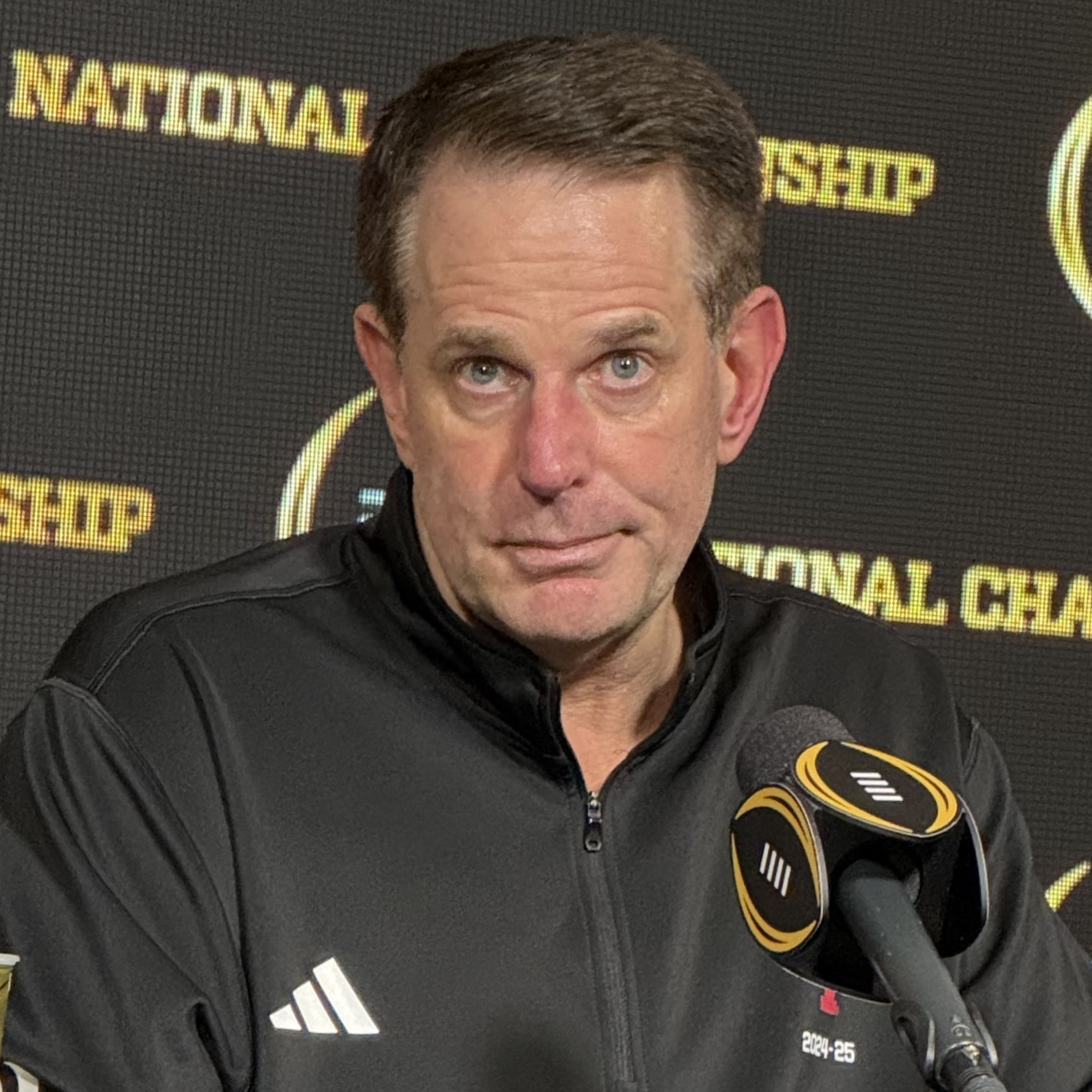
Indiana coach Curt Cignetti, 2024–present

On November 30, 2023, Indiana athletics director Scott Dolson announced the hiring of James Madison University head coach Curt Cignetti as the next Hoosiers head coach. The 62-year-old Cignetti arrived in Bloomington with impressive credentials, never having a single losing season in 13 years as a head coach at JMU, Elon University, and IUP. He also oversaw the Dukes' successful transition from the FCS to the FBS and served as wide receivers coach and recruiting coordinator at Alabama under Nick Saban from 2007 to 2010, playing a significant role in the recruitment of many of the Crimson Tide's key players as well as coaching and developing star wide receiver Julio Jones and others. When hired, Cignetti signed a six-year contract with IU which pays about $27 million excluding incentives over the course of the deal.

In his first season in 2024, Cignetti guided the Hoosiers to their first 8–0 start since 1967, then to their first 9–0 start in school history, and then to their first 10–0 start in school program history and also their first ever 10-win season in program history. On November 16, 2024, the university administration and Cignetti agreed to a new eight-year contract worth $72 million excluding incentives. After the 2024 regular season, the Hoosiers made their first College Football Playoff appearance in program history. The tenth seed Hoosiers were defeated by the seventh seed Notre Dame Fighting Irish at Notre Dame Stadium in the first ever on campus College Football Playoff game on December 20, 2024. On October 16, 2025, Cignetti signed his second extension with Indiana, an eight-year, $93.25 million contract running through the 2032 season, making him one of the highest paid coaches in college football.

The 2025 season set further program records. Their 56–3 victory over Purdue on November 28, 2025, gave the Hoosiers their second ever undefeated regular season and first berth into the Big Ten Football Championship Game. The Hoosiers defeated top-ranked Ohio State 13–10 to win their first Big Ten championship since 1967 and first solo championship since 1945. On December 7, the 13–0 Hoosiers were announced as being ranked #1 in the AP poll for the first time in school history. Quarterback Fernando Mendoza became the first Hoosier to win the Heisman Trophy. After a bye during the first round of the playoffs, the Hoosiers defeated Alabama 38–3 in the Rose Bowl quarterfinal game on January 1, 2026. In the semifinal round, the Hoosiers faced the Oregon Ducks in the Peach Bowl on January 9, 2026, winning 56–22 to advance to the National Championship. The Hoosiers defeated the Miami Hurricanes 27–21 to become the 2025–26 College Football Playoff National Champions and completing the greatest turnaround in college football history.

== Conference affiliations ==
- Independent (1887–1899)
- Big Ten Conference (1900–present)
  - Western Conference (1900–1952)
  - Big Ten Conference (1953–present)

== Championships ==
=== National ===
Indiana has won one national championship.

| Year | Head coach | Selector(s) | Overall Record | Big Ten Record | Bowl Game(s) | AP Poll | Coaches Poll |
|---|---|---|---|---|---|---|---|
| 2025 | Curt Cignetti | CFP, AP, Coaches | 16–0 | 9–0 | Won Rose Bowl (CFP Quarterfinal); Won Peach Bowl (CFP Semifinal); Won CFP National Championship | No. 1 | No. 1 |

=== Conference ===
Indiana has won three conference championships, two outright and one shared.

| Year | Conference | Coach | Overall Record | Conference Record |
|---|---|---|---|---|
| 1945 | Big Ten Conference | Bo McMillin | 9–0–1 | 5–0–1 |
| 1967† | Big Ten Conference | John Pont | 9–2 | 6–1 |
| 2025 | Big Ten Conference | Curt Cignetti | 16–0 | 9–0 |

† Co-champion

== Bowl games ==
Indiana has participated in 17 bowl games in 120 seasons, garnering a record of 6–11 through the 2025 season. An oft-spoken mantra, coined after Terry Hoeppner's death prior to the 2007 season, is to "play 13," meaning to play an extra game (a bowl game) after the 12-game regular season.

| Year | Coach | Bowl | Opponent | Result |
|---|---|---|---|---|
| 1967 | John Pont | Rose Bowl † | USC | L 3–14 |
| 1979 | Lee Corso | Holiday Bowl | BYU | W 38–37 |
| 1986 | Bill Mallory | All-American Bowl | Florida State | L 13–27 |
| 1987 | Bill Mallory | Peach Bowl | Tennessee | L 22–27 |
| 1988 | Bill Mallory | Liberty Bowl | South Carolina | W 34–10 |
| 1990 | Bill Mallory | Peach Bowl | Auburn | L 23–27 |
| 1991 | Bill Mallory | Copper Bowl | Baylor | W 24–0 |
| 1993 | Bill Mallory | Independence Bowl | Virginia Tech | L 20–45 |
| 2007 | Bill Lynch | Insight Bowl | Oklahoma State | L 33–49 |
| 2015 | Kevin Wilson | Pinstripe Bowl | Duke | L 41–44^{OT} |
| 2016 | Tom Allen | Foster Farms Bowl | Utah | L 24–26 |
| 2019 | Tom Allen | Gator Bowl | Tennessee | L 22–23 |
| 2020 | Tom Allen | Outback Bowl | Ole Miss | L 20–26 |
| 2024 | Curt Cignetti | CFP First Round † | Notre Dame | L 17–27 |
| 2025 | Curt Cignetti | Rose Bowl † | Alabama | W 38–3 |
| 2025 | Curt Cignetti | Peach Bowl † | Oregon | W 56–22 |
| 2025 | Curt Cignetti | CFP National Championship † | Miami | W 27–21 |

† CFP/New Year's game

By decade:

| Decade | W-L |
|---|---|
| 1960s | 0–1 |
| 1970s | 1–0 |
| 1980s | 1–2 |
| 1990s | 1–2 |
| 2000s | 0–1 |
| 2010s | 0–3 |
| 2020s | 3–2 |

== Head coaches ==
| Coach | Years | Seasons | Record | Pct | Bowls |
|---|---|---|---|---|---|
| Arthur B. Woodford | 1887–1888 | 2 | 0–1–1 | .250 | |
| Evans Woollen | 1889 | 1 | 0–1 | .000 | |
| Billy Herod | 1891 | 1 | 1–5 | .167 | |
| None | 1892–1893 | 2 | 3–6–1 | .350 | |
| Gustave Ferbert & Joseph R. Hudelson | 1894 | 1 | 0–4–1 | .100 | |
| Winchester Osgood | 1895 | 1 | 4–3–1 | .563 | |
| Madison G. Gonterman | 1896–1897 | 2 | 12–3–1 | .781 | |
| James H. Horne | 1898–1904 | 7 | 33–21–5 | .602 | |
| James M. Sheldon | 1905–1913 | 9 | 35–26–3 | .570 | |
| Clarence Childs | 1914–1915 | 2 | 6–7–1 | .464 | |
| Ewald O. Stiehm | 1916–1921 | 5 | 20–18–1 | .526 | |
| James P. Herron | 1922 | 1 | 1–4–2 | .286 | |
| Bill Ingram | 1923–1925 | 3 | 10–12–1 | .457 | |
| Harlan Page | 1926–1930 | 5 | 14–23–3 | .388 | |
| Earl C. Hayes | 1931–1933 | 3 | 8–14–4 | .385 | |
| Bo McMillin | 1934–1947 | 14 | 63–48–11 | .561 | |
| Clyde Smith | 1948–1951 | 4 | 8–27–1 | .236 | |
| Bernie Crimmins | 1952–1956 | 5 | 13–32 | .289 | |
| Bob Hicks | 1957 | 1 | 1–8 | .111 | |
| Phil Dickens | 1958–1964 | 7 | 20–41–2 | .333 | |
| John Pont | 1965–1972 | 8 | 31–51–1 | .380 | 0–1 |
| Lee Corso | 1973–1982 | 10 | 41–68–2 | .378 | 1–0 |
| Sam Wyche | 1983 | 1 | 3–8 | .273 | |
| Bill Mallory | 1984–1996 | 13 | 69–77–3 | .473 | 2–4 |
| Cam Cameron | 1997–2001 | 5 | 18–37 | .327 | |
| Gerry DiNardo | 2002–2004 | 3 | 8–27 | .229 | |
| Terry Hoeppner | 2005–2006 | 2 | 9–14 | .391 | |
| Bill Lynch | 2007–2010 | 4 | 19–30 | .388 | 0–1 |
| Kevin Wilson | 2011–2016 | 6 | 26–46 | .361 | 0–1 |
| Tom Allen | 2016–2023 | 7 | 33–49 | .402 | 0–3 |
| Curt Cignetti | 2024–present | 3 | 36–3 | .941 | 3–1 |

== Facilities ==
=== Jordan Field (1887–1924) ===
Created in 1887, Indiana's first athletic grounds, Jordan Field was originally named University Athletic Field before being renamed in 1898, in honor of then-Indiana University President David Starr Jordan. The field was a mixed-use facility utilized by both the football and baseball teams. Bleacher seating for 4,000 persons were added in 1901, with field drainage added the following year to alleviate flooding.

In 1904, a track and field component was added to the athletic facility; however, conditions of the field continued to be a problem for the Hoosiers. The track and field portion of Jordan Field was upgraded in 1915. A proposed stadium, north of the current facility, was planned by the university; however, the outbreak of World War I postponed construction. The football and baseball teams would continue play at Jordan Field through the end of 1923. The proposed stadium would begin construction in 1924 and would open in the fall of 1925. The final varsity athletic event for Jordan Field, a baseball game, would occur in 1950 prior to the facility being turned into a parking lot for the nearby Indiana Memorial Union.

=== Memorial Stadium (1925–1959) ===
Indiana's two Memorial Stadiums are entirely distinct venues and share only the same name, though never at the same time. The current Memorial Stadium was called Seventeenth Street Football Stadium until 1972, when it was renamed Memorial Stadium and the original stadium was renamed Tenth Street Stadium. Tenth Street Stadium hosted the Little 500 bicycle race until Bill Armstrong Stadium was built in 1981. It was demolished in the same year and its former place on campus is occupied by the arboretum. Shortly before its demolition, the old stadium was featured in the 1979 cult movie classic Breaking Away – filmed primarily on the Indiana campus and the surrounding Bloomington, Indiana area.

=== Memorial Stadium (1960–present) ===
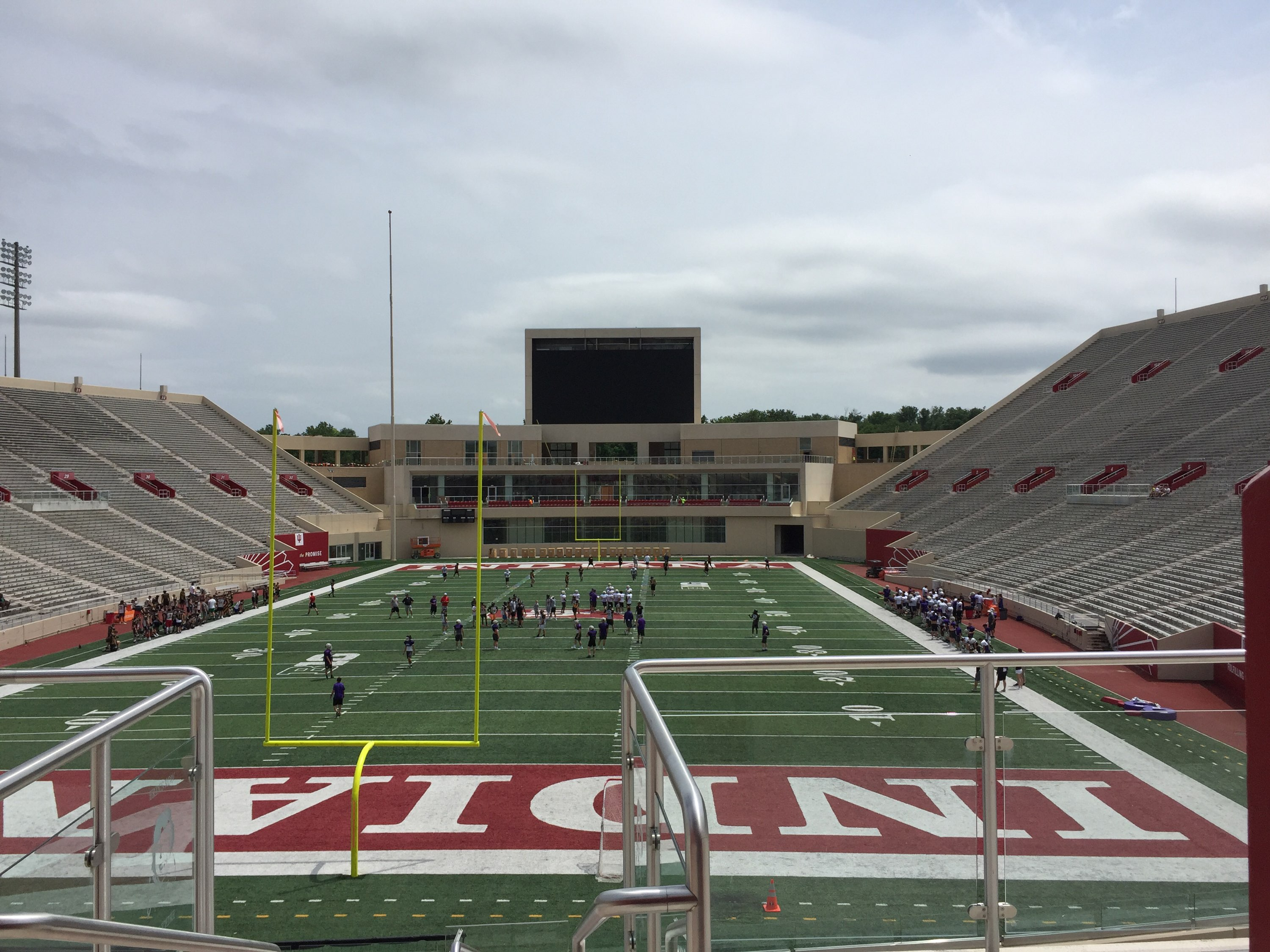
Memorial Stadium

The current iteration of Memorial Stadium opened in 1960 as part of a new athletics area at the university and has a capacity of 52,656. It replaced the original Memorial Stadium, built in 1925, a 20,000-seat stadium located on 10th Street where the arboretum now stands. The stadium has been expanded twice since the original construction. The $38 million, 138,000-square-foot, North End Zone Student-Athlete Development Center opened in 2009. The $53 million, 66,575-square-foot, South End Zone Student-Athlete Excellence Center opened in 2018.

=== John Mellencamp Pavilion (1996–present) ===
The John Mellencamp Pavilion is the primary indoor athletics training facility of the Indiana Hoosiers' football program. It was dedicated on April 12, 1996, following a donation of $1.5 million from singer-songwriter John Mellencamp, to facilitate the project. The indoor practice facility contains a regulation-sized football field, featuring a Sportexe Momentum 41 artificial surface which was installed in 2007.

== Rivalries ==
=== Illinois ===
While not as intense as the men's basketball rivalry between the schools, the football rivalry between Illinois and Indiana dates back to 1899 and has been played 73 times. When the Big Ten split into non-geographical divisions in 2011, both the Fighting Illini and Hoosiers were placed in the "Leaders" division, thereby ensuring an annual meeting on the football field. However, when the Big Ten opted for a divisional format based on geography three years later, Illinois was placed in the "West" division with Indiana placed in the "East", making the series intermittent once again. The Big Ten eliminated its divisional format for 2024 and beyond; only protected rivalries now compete annually, and Illinois–Indiana was not included as a protected rivalry. Illinois leads the all-time series 46–26–2.

=== Kentucky ===
The Hoosiers have a nonconference rivalry with bordering-state opponent Kentucky that is most prominent in men's basketball but also extends to football as well. The Hoosiers played the Wildcats annually from 1987 until 2005 in what was known as the "Bourbon Barrel" game. The two teams played for a trophy called the "Bourbon Barrel" from 1987 until both schools mutually agreed to retire the trophy in 1999 following the alcohol-related death of a Kentucky football player. The two teams last met on September 17, 2005, with Indiana winning 38–14; Indiana leads the overall series (18–17–1). As of August 2025, there are no future plans for the schools to meet on the football field.

=== Michigan State ===
Indiana has a football trophy game (for the Old Brass Spittoon) against bordering-state opponent Michigan State. The Spartans were Indiana's dedicated cross-divisional rival in the Big Ten during the era of the Legends and Leaders divisions (2011–2013). From 2014 to 2023, the Hoosiers and Spartans were in the Big Ten East division and played each other annually. As of 2025, both schools have won a combined 12 Big Ten championships. Michigan State leads the all-time series 49–20–2.

=== Ohio State ===
The football rivalry between Ohio State and Indiana dates back to 1901, with the teams meeting 99 times, where Ohio State leads the series 81–13–5. Both schools have been members of the Big Ten Conference for over a century, with Indiana joining in 1899 and Ohio State in 1912. Ohio State has defeated the Hoosiers three times in top–10 ranked matchups in 2020, 2024 and 2026. In 2025, #2 Indiana defeated #1 Ohio State in that season's Big Ten Championship Game, ending their 29–game skid against the Buckeyes.

=== Purdue ===
Indiana's biggest, oldest and most prominent rivalry is with in-state opponent Purdue. The teams compete for the Old Oaken Bucket, most recently held by Indiana after defeating the Boilermakers during the 2025 season. Purdue leads the series 77–44–6 through the 2025 season. When the Big Ten split into geographical divisions in 2014, the Hoosiers and Boilermakers were placed in opposite divisions but the conference protected this rivalry as an annual contest. The series was designated as a protected rivalry when the conference expanded to 18 schools in 2024.

== Legacy ==
Historically, Indiana's football program was widely perceived as one of the least successful programs in Division I college football history. This perception stood in stark contrast to the school's men's basketball program, which is considered among the most prestigious in the country. As such, before 2024, athletic directors at Indiana mostly focused on basketball, relegating Hoosier football to somewhat of an afterthought. From September 2012 until November 2025, the Indiana University football program had the most all-time losses (715 as of November 2025) in the history of NCAA Division I (now FBS) football until Northwestern re-claimed this feat with a loss to USC. In addition, the Hoosiers hold the fifth worst all-time winning percentage (.420) among FBS schools with over 1000 games played, the second worst for power conference teams. Since 1895, only six of the 25 head coaches have left Indiana University with a winning record, the last one being Bo McMillin in 1947.

Following the hiring of head coach Curt Cignetti in 2023, the Hoosiers reached new heights the program had never seen before. In just two seasons, Cignetti led the program to its first ever 10-win season, first ever College Football Playoff appearance, first Big Ten Championship since 1967, first Heisman Trophy winner, first Rose Bowl win, first National Championship Game appearance, and ultimately an undefeated 16–0 season for the program's first ever National Championship. The Hoosiers' turnaround is widely considered as the greatest turnaround in college football history, and one of the greatest in American sports history.

During a bye week, after signing a contract extension, Coach Curt Cignetti claimed Indiana was, "the emerging superpower in college football".

As of the 2024 season, four different Hoosiers head coaches have won the AFCA Coach of the Year Award in Division I FBS, tied for the most in the awards' 90-year history.

== Individual awards and honors ==
=== Retired numbers ===
Indiana Hoosiers retired numbers
| No. | Player | Pos. | Tenure | Ref. |
|---|---|---|---|---|
| 32 | Anthony Thompson | RB | 1986–1989 | |

=== College Football Hall of Famers ===
College Football Hall of Fame
| Name | Pos. | Year Inducted |
|---|---|---|
| Bo McMillin | Coach | 1951 |
| Pete Pihos | DE/FB | 1966 |
| Zora Clevenger | HB | 1968 |
| Bill Ingram | Coach | 1973 |
| George Taliaferro | HB | 1981 |
| John Tavener | C | 1990 |
| Anthony Thompson | RB | 2007 |

=== Pro Football Hall of Famers ===
Pro Football Hall of Fame
| Name | Pos. | Year Inducted |
|---|---|---|
| Pete Pihos | WR/DE | 1970 |

=== National award winners ===
Players

- Heisman Trophy

Fernando Mendoza – 2025

- AP Player of the Year

Fernando Mendoza – 2025

- Maxwell Award

Anthony Thompson – 1989
Fernando Mendoza – 2025

- Walter Camp Award

Anthony Thompson – 1989
Fernando Mendoza – 2025

- Davey O'Brien Award (top quarterback)

Fernando Mendoza – 2025

- Jon Cornish Trophy (top Canadian NCAA player)

Kurtis Rourke – 2024

Coaches

- AFCA Coach of the Year

Bo McMillin – 1945
John Pont – 1967
Tom Allen – 2020
Curt Cignetti – 2024, 2025

- AP Coach of the Year Award

Curt Cignetti – 2024, 2025

- Bobby Dodd Coach of the Year Award

Curt Cignetti – 2025

- Eddie Robinson Coach of the Year Award

Curt Cignetti – 2024

- Home Depot Coach of the Year

Curt Cignetti – 2024, 2025

- The Sporting News Coach of the Year

Curt Cignetti – 2024

- Walter Camp Coach of the Year Award

Curt Cignetti – 2024, 2025

- AFCA Assistant Coach of the Year

Bryant Haines – 2025

- Broyles Award (top FBS assistant coach)

Bryant Haines – 2025

=== Heisman Finalists ===
- Anthony Thompson – 1989
- Fernando Mendoza – 2025 †

† won award

=== Consensus All Americans ===
- Billy Hillenbrand – 1942
- John Tavener – 1944
- Bob Ravensberg – 1945
- Anthony Thompson – 1988
- Anthony Thompson – 1989
- Vaughn Dunbar – 1991
- Tevin Coleman – 2014
- Fernando Mendoza – 2025
- Carter Smith – 2025

=== Big Ten Conference honors ===
Players

- Chicago Tribune Silver Football

Chuck Bennett – 1928
Vern Huffman – 1936
Corbett Davis – 1937
Tim Clifford – 1979
Anthony Thompson – 1988, 1989
Antwaan Randle El – 2001
Fernando Mendoza – 2025

- Player of the Year

Anthony Thompson – 1988, 1989

- Offensive Player of the Year

Antwaan Randle El – 2001
Fernando Mendoza – 2025

- Freshman of the Year

Antwaan Randle El – 1998

- Return Specialist of the Year

Jaylin Lucas - 2022

- Quarterback of the Year

Fernando Mendoza – 2025

- Offensive Lineman of the Year

Carter Smith – 2025

- Kicker of the Year

Nico Radicic – 2025

Coaches

- Coach of the Year

Bill Mallory – 1986, 1987
Tom Allen – 2020
Curt Cignetti – 2024, 2025

== School records ==
Records from the 1956 season through the 2018 season.

=== Career ===
- Passing Yards: 7,879 – Nate Sudfeld, (2012–2015)
- Receiving Yards: 2,740 – James Hardy, (2005–2007)
- Rushing Yards: 5,299 – Anthony Thompson, (1986–1989)
- Touchdowns: 65 – Anthony Thompson, (1986–1989)
- Sacks: 34.5 – Adewale Ogunleye, (1996–1999)
- Interceptions: 19 – Tim Wilbur, (1978–1982)

=== Season ===
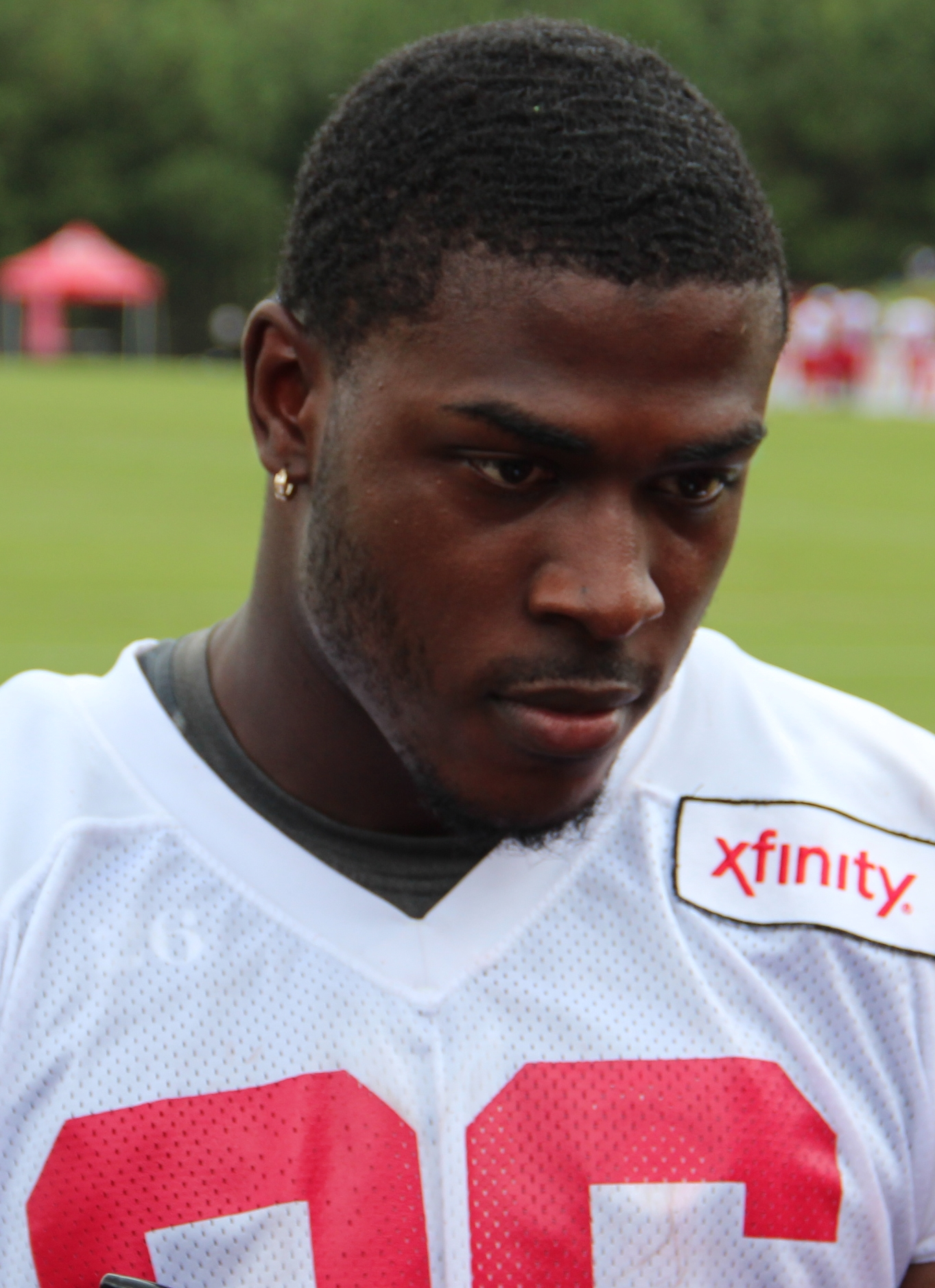
Tevin Coleman rushed for 2,036 yards in 2014

- Passing Yards: 3,573 – Nate Sudfeld, (2015)
- Receiving Yards: 1,265 – Ernie Jones, (1987)
- Rushing Yards: 2,036 – Tevin Coleman, (2014)
- Touchdowns: 41 – Fernando Mendoza, (2025)
- Sacks: 16 – Greg Middleton, (2007)
- Interceptions: 8 – Tim Wilbur, (1979)

=== Game ===
- Passing Yards: 496 – Richard Lagow vs. Wake Forest Demon Deacons, 9/24/16
- Passing Touchdowns: 6 – Tre Roberson vs. Purdue Boilermakers, 11/30/13
- Receiving Yards: 285 – Thomas Lewis at Penn State Nittany Lions, 11/6/93
- Rushing Yards: 377 – Anthony Thompson at Wisconsin Badgers, 11/11/89
- Rushing Touchdowns: 6 – Levron Williams at Wisconsin Badgers, 10/6/01
- Sacks: 4 – Van Waiters at Michigan State Spartans, 11/8/86; Adewale Ogunleye at Ohio State Buckeyes, 10/18/97; Matt Mayberry vs. Central Michigan, 11/1/08
- Interceptions: 5 players tied at 3 interceptions

== Culture ==
=== Marching band ===
The Indiana University Marching Hundred is the marching band of Indiana University. The Marching Hundred is the primary source of auxiliary entertainment for Indiana University football games. Its history traces to 1896 as a small 22-piece ensemble, though by the 1920s newspaper columnists referred to the band as "the Indiana University all-American marching hundred." Despite the name, the Marching Hundred fields several hundred wind instrumentalists, a drumline, the RedStepper Dance Team, and Indiana University Color Guard.

Prior to the football game, the Marching Hundred entertains fans at "The Walk," a concert performed on the west side of Assembly Hall that culminates in greeting football players as they exit the buses and enter the stadium. Members then perform a 20-minute pre-game performance to introduce the football team on to the field, play short tunes within the stands during the game, learn and perform at least 8 halftime shows, and finish with an in-stadium concert after the game ends.

=== Mascots ===
IU student-athletes are known as "Hoosiers," the demonym for natives or residents of Indiana. Several attempts were made at Indiana University since the early 19th century at mascots including a goat in 1923, an owl, a raccoon, an eagle, a collie in 1935, "Mr. Hoosier Schoolmaster" who debuted in 1951, a Crimson Bull in 1956, a bulldog named "Ox" in 1959, and "Mr. Hoosier Pride" debuting in 1979.

==== Hoosier the Bison ====
The bison served as IU's longest-running official mascot from 1965 to 1969, but found itself retired two years after the 1967 Rose Bowl appearance. An on-campus movement during the pandemic campaigned for the return of the bison. "Hoosier the Bison" was teased on social media and officially revealed online by IU Athletics on May 27, 2025. Hoosier made its first public appearance during the pre-game Marching Hundred performance on August 30, 2025.

== Uniforms ==
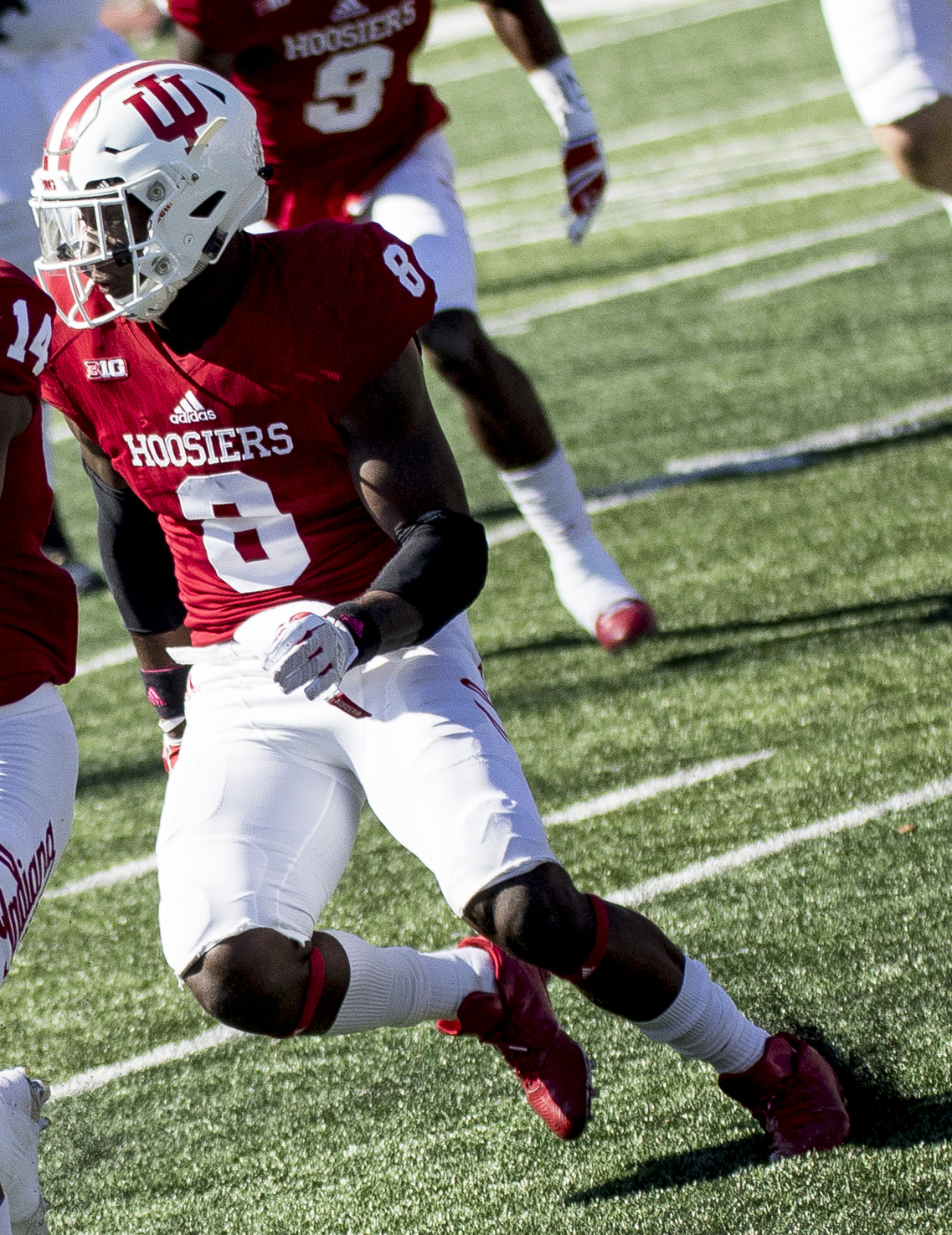
Tegray Scales wearing the Hoosiers' home red uniform

The Indiana football team has primarily worn a home uniform of red jerseys (usually a variation of crimson red) with either red or white pants for most of the program's history. There have also been different designs incorporated into the main jerseys and pants, which have largely utilized the Block-I logo or interlocking-IU logo, striping and different variations and placement on the words 'Indiana' or 'Hoosier'. For away games the Hoosiers utilize white jerseys with white pants. Notable exceptions have also included the use of red-on-red color combinations for the jersey and pants, as well as white jerseys with red pants.

While the Hoosiers do not have designated alternate uniforms, there have been times when the uniforms were altered from their traditional design. During the Cam Cameron era (1997–2001), the jerseys and Block-I logo were changed to a red, black and white color scheme, while also incorporating an original design for the traditional IU athletics logo; the design and color combination were reverted to the interlocking-IU logo and official colors of Indiana following the departure of Cameron.

For the 2018 season, the rear name-plate on the jerseys were not included to keep the uniforms standardized to Indiana's tradition of "honoring "Team Over Self" by not including the players' names on backs of jerseys in any sport"; however, the rear name-plate was added back to the jersey beginning in the 2019 season.

=== Helmets ===
Indiana has historically used a variation of its red and white scheme in its helmet design. The designs have included, but are not limited to: placing the Block-I logo on either side of the helmet (as well as on the front of the helmet - 1959-1961), an all red or all white helmet, the inclusion of the aforementioned redesigned IU logo from the Cam Cameron era (1997-2001), the use of the Indiana state flag logo on one side of the helmet, as well as an alternating red and chrome-striped helmet. Additionally, striping on the helmet has been included on the varied designs.

== Active alumni in the NFL ==
- Dan Feeney (Tampa Bay Buccaneers)
- Luke Haggard (Tampa Bay Buccaneers)
- Cam Jones (New York Giants)
- Raheem Layne (New York Giants)
- Micah McFadden (New York Giants)
- Myles Price (Minnesota Vikings)
- Kurtis Rourke (San Francisco 49ers)
- Ian Thomas (Las Vegas Raiders)
- Ke'Shawn Williams (Cincinnati Bengals)
- CJ West (San Francisco 49ers)
- Nick Westbrook-Ikhine (Indianapolis Colts)
- Fernando Mendoza (Las Vegas Raiders)
- Aiden Fisher (Houston Texans)
- Omar Cooper Jr. (New York Jets)
- D'Angelo Ponds (New York Jets)
- Elijah Sarratt (Baltimore Ravens)
- Pat Coogan (Tennessee Titans)
- Riley Nowakowski (Pittsburgh Steelers)
- Kahlil Benson (Kansas City Chiefs)
- Kaelon Black (San Francisco 49ers)

== Future non-conference opponents ==
Announced schedules as of October 14, 2026. Indiana's home-and-home series with Notre Dame, scheduled for the 2030 and 2031 seasons, was cancelled in August of 2026.

| 2027 | 2028 | 2029 | 2030 | 2031 | 2032 |
|---|---|---|---|---|---|
| Jacksonville State | Austin Peay | Ball State | Miami (OH) | | at UConn |
| Kennesaw State | Eastern Michigan | Eastern Illinois | Indiana State | | |
| Indiana State | Miami (OH) | Western Kentucky | Delaware | | |
