= 1899 Western Conference football season =

American college football season

- Sport: Football
- Number of teams: 7
- Champion: Chicago

Football seasons
- ← 1898 1900 →

1899 Western Conference football standings
	Conf.					Overall
Team	W		L		T	W		L		T
Chicago $	4	–	0	–	0	16	–	0	–	2
Wisconsin	4	–	1	–	0	9	–	2	–	0
Northwestern	2	–	2	–	0	7	–	6	–	0
Michigan	1	–	1	–	0	8	–	2	–	0
Purdue	1	–	2	–	0	4	–	4	–	1
Minnesota	0	–	3	–	0	6	–	3	–	2
Illinois	0	–	3	–	0	3	–	5	–	1
$ – Conference champion

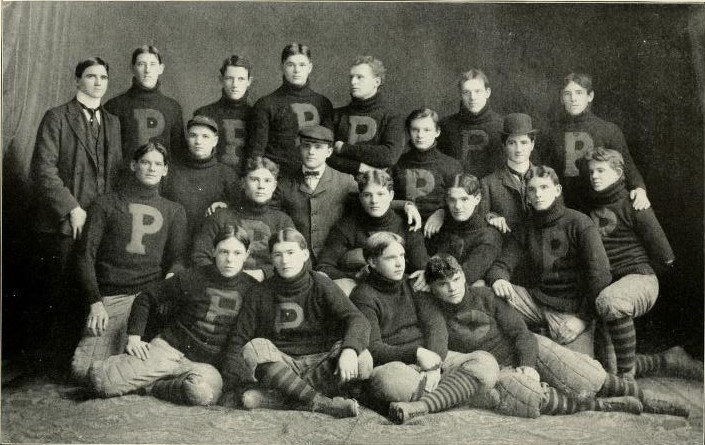
Portrait of 1899 Purdue football team

The 1899 Western Conference football season was the fourth season of college football played by the member schools of the Western Conference (later known as the Big Ten Conference) and was a part of the 1899 college football season.

The 1899 Chicago Maroons football team, under head coach Amos Alonzo Stagg, won the conference championship with a 16–0–2 overall record (4–0 against conference opponents), led the conference in both scoring offense (28.1 points per game) and scoring defense (1.6 points per game), shut out 13 of 18 opponents, and outscored all opponents by a combined total of 505 to 28.

== Season overview ==
=== Results and team statistics ===
Conf. Rank	Team	Head coach	Overall record	Conf. record	PPG	PAG
1	Chicago	Amos A. Stagg	16–0–2	4–0	28.1	1.6
2	Wisconsin	Philip King	9–2	4–1	24.5	3.0
3 (tie)	Michigan	Gustave Ferbert	7–2–1	1–1	17.6	4.3
3 (tie)	Northwestern	Charles Hollister	7–6	2–2	11.1	13.6
5	Purdue	Alpha Jamison	4–4–1	1–2	11.1	13.6
6 (tie)	Minnesota	William C. Leary; Jack Harrison	6–3–2	0-3	13.7	7.2
6 (tie)	Illinois	George Huff	3–5–1	0–3	4.4	10.7

Key

PPG = Average of points scored per game
PAG = Average of points allowed per game

=== Regular season ===
Only 12 conference games were played during the 1899 Western Conference season. The results were as follows:

- October 14, 1899: Wisconsin defeated Northwestern, 38-0, at Madison, Wisconsin
- October 28, 1899: Michigan defeated Illinois, 5-0, at Champaign, Illinois
- November 4, 1899: Chicago defeated Purdue, 44-0, at Chicago
- November 4, 1899: Northwestern defeated Minnesota, 11-0, at Minneapolis
- November 11, 1899: Chicago defeated Northwestern, 76-0, at Chicago
- November 11, 1899: Wisconsin defeated Illinois, 23-0, at Milwaukee
- November 18, 1899: Wisconsin defeated Minnesota, 19-0, at Minneapolis
- November 22, 1899: Purdue defeated Illinois, 5-0, at West Lafayette, Indiana
- November 25, 1899: Chicago defeated Minnesota, 29-0, at Chicago
- November 25, 1899: Northwestern defeated Purdue, 29-0, at Evanston, Illinois
- November 30, 1899: Wisconsin defeated Michigan, 17-5, at Chicago
- December 9, 1899: Chicago defeated Wisconsin, 17-0, at Madison, Wisconsin

Notable non-conference games during the 1899 season included the following:

- October 4, 1899: Chicago defeated Notre Dame, 23–6, at Chicago
- October 14, 1899: Illinois lost to Indiana, 5–0, at Champaign, Illinois
- October 18, 1899: Michigan defeated Notre Dame, 12–0, at Ann Arbor, Michigan
- October 21, 1899: Minnesota defeated Iowa State, 6–0, at Minneapolis
- October 7, 1899: Chicago tied with Iowa, 5–5, at Chicago
- October 14, 1899: Chicago defeated Cornell, 17–6, at Chicago
- October 21, 1899: Wisconsin lost to Yale, 6–0, at New Haven, Connecticut
- October 28, 1899: Chicago tied with Penn, 5–5, at Chicago
- October 28, 1899: Northwestern lost to Notre Dame, 12–0, at South Bend, Indiana
- November 4, 1899: Michigan defeated Virginia, 38–0, at Detroit
- November 11, 1899: Michigan lost to Penn, 11–10, at Philadelphia
- November 18, 1899: Northwestern defeated Indiana, 11–6, at Evanston, Illinois
- November 18, 1899: Purdue tied Notre Dame, 10–10, at West Lafayette, Indiana
- November 25, 1899: Illinois defeated Saint Louis, 29–0, at St. Louis
- November 30, 1899: Chicago defeated Brown, 17–6, at Chicago
- November 30, 1899: Purdue lost to Indiana, 17–5, at West Lafayette, Indiana
- November 30, 1899: Illinois lost to Iowa, 58–0, at Champaign, Illinois

=== Bowl games ===
No bowl games were played during the 1899 season.

== Awards and honors ==
=== All-Western players ===
The Northwestern named a 1899 All-Western college football team that consisted of the following players:

- Neil Snow, end, Michigan
- James M. Sheldon, end, Chicago
- Arthur Hale Curtis, tackle, Wisconsin
- Jonathan E. Webb, tackle, Chicago
- Richard France, guard, Michigan
- C. Rogers, guard, Wisconsin
- Roy Chamberlain, center, Wisconsin
- Walter S. Kennedy, quarterback, Chicago
- Ralph C. Hamill, halfback, Chicago
- John McLean, halfback, Michigan
- Pat O'Dea, fullback, Wisconsin

=== All-Americans ===
No Western Conference players were selected as first-team players on the 1899 College Football All-America Teams selected by Walter Camp and Caspar Whitney. However, the Philadelphia Inquirer picked an All-American that named four Western Conference players to the first team: end Neil Snow of Michigan; tackle Richard France of Michigan; quarterback Walter S. Kennedy of Chicago; and halfback John McLean of Michigan.
