= Walter S. Kennedy =

American football player and coach, newspaper publisher (1873–1954)

Biographical details
- Born: c. 1873; Woodburn, Iowa, U.S.
- Died: April 28, 1954; Albion, Michigan, U.S.

Playing career

Football
- ?: Tarkio
- 1896–1899: Chicago
- Positions: Quarterback, halfback, tackle

Coaching career (HC unless noted)

Football
- 1904–1905: Albion
- 1908–1912: Albion
- 1915–1917: Albion
- 1918–1919: Albion (co-HC)
- 1920: Albion

Basketball
- 1910–1913: Albion

Head coaching record
- Overall: 57–23–8 (football)

Accomplishments and honors

Championships
- Football; 5 MIAA (1904, 1908, 1911, 1915, 1920)

Awards
- 2× Second-team All-American (1898, 1899)

Walter Scott Kennedy (c. 1873 – April 28, 1954) was an American college football player and coach, college basketball coach, and newspaper publisher. He was an All-American quarterback for the University of Chicago and captain of the Chicago Maroons football teams in 1898 and 1899. Kennedy later moved to Albion, Michigan, where he was the publisher of the Albion Evening Recorder from 1904 to 1939. There he was also the head football coach at Albion College for three stints between 1904 and 1920 and school's head basketball coach from 1910 to 1913.

== Biography ==
=== Early years ===
Kennedy was born in Woodburn, Iowa, in approximately 1873. He played high school football at Villisca, Iowa. After graduating from high school, Kennedy attended Tarkio College in Tarkio, Missouri, where he again played football.

=== University of Chicago ===
Kennedy enrolled at the University of Chicago where he played football for head coach Amos Alonzo Stagg from 1896 to 1899. He also competed for Chicago in baseball and track. Kennedy was five feet, nine inches tall and weighed 196 pounds. He began his football career as a tackle, but he was moved to the halfback position in 1897, playing in the same backfield as future College Football Hall of Fame inductee, Clarence Herschberger. At the end of the 1897 season, his teammates elected him as the captain of the 1898 Chicago Maroons football team. At the time of his election as team captain, the Chicago Daily Tribune wrote: "In guarding the men who carry the ball and in breaking up the interference of the opposing team he is unsurpassed in the West, and is a hard man to stop when he himself advances the ball."

For the 1898 and 1899 seasons, Kennedy was moved to the quarterback position. In November 1898, questions were raised as to Kennedy's eligibility to play college football. An individual formerly associated with Chicago football, who was then coaching in Iowa, wrote a letter to the University of Chicago reporting that Kennedy's mother had informed him that her son was receiving $500 a year to play football at Chicago. Several additional letters were received, raising questions about Kennedy's past, including his baseball record. The University of Chicago concluded that Kennedy was eligible, and he was selected by Walter Camp as a second-team All-American quarterback in 1898.

In February 1899, Caspar Whitney renewed the controversy over Kennedy's eligibility in an article published in Harper's Weekly. Whitney had secured a copy of the Western Conference rules and argued that Kennedy, having played college football at Tarkio College for at least one season, was not eligible to play a fourth year of varsity football for Chicago.

Despite the questions over his eligibility, Kennedy (at age 26) was permitted to return in 1899 as Chicago's starting quarterback. He was also chosen to be Chicago's captain for a second time in 1899. Several schools, including Michigan, Illinois, and Wisconsin boycotted Chicago in 1899, protesting Chicago's use of players with dubious eligibility. The 1899 Chicago Maroons defeated Notre Dame (23–6), Cornell (17–6), Purdue (44–0), Northwestern (76–0), Minnesota (29–0), and Brown(17–6), and played to ties against Iowa (5–5) and Penn (5–5). n 1929, a columnist in the Chicago Daily Tribune wrote that the undefeated 1899 team was considered one of the two greatest Chicago football teams of all time.

Because of the boycott of Chicago, the 1899 season ended with uncertainty as to whether Chicago or Wisconsin had fielded the best team in the West. Wisconsin agreed to a postseason championship game against Chicago. The game, played on December 9, was Kennedy's last game for Chicago. The Maroons won the game, 17–0, and Kennedy later described the game as his "greatest thrill in football." The game matched the punting skills of Wisconsin's Pat O'Dea against Kennedy's punting. Kennedy was forced to punt from Chicago's ten-yard line, and Kennedy kicked the ball as he was being thrown to the ground by Wisconsin end Eddie Cochems. The kick proved to be the longest punt of Kennedy's career. At the end of the 1899 season, he was selected as a first-team All-American by The Philadelphia Inquirer. He was selected as an All-Western player at either halfback or quarterback three straight years from 1897 to 1899.

=== Later years ===
After graduating from Chicago, Kennedy went into the newspaper business. He began his newspaper career as a football writer for the Chicago Daily Tribune in 1900. In 1904, Kennedy moved to Albion, Michigan, where he worked as both a newspaperman and football coach. He was the publisher of the Albion Evening Recorder from 1904 to 1939.

Kennedy served three stints at the head football coach at Albion College—from 1904 to 1905, 1908 to 1912, and 1915 to 1920—leading his teams to a record of 57–23–8 and five Michigan Intercollegiate Athletic Association (MIAA) championships in 14 seasons. He was also the head basketball coach at Albion from 1910 to 1913, tallying a mark of 17–15 in three seasons.

Kennedy died at age 79, on April 28, 1954, in Albion.

== Head coaching record ==
=== Football ===
Year	Team	Overall	Conference	Standing	Bowl/playoffs
Albion Methodists (Michigan Intercollegiate Athletic Association) (1904–1905)
1904	Albion	7–0–1	5–0	1st	
1905	Albion	5–2	4–1	2nd	
Albion (Michigan Intercollegiate Athletic Association) (1908–1912)
1908	Albion	5–0–2	3–0–2	1st	
1909	Albion	3–3–1	2–2–1		
1910	Albion	5–1	4–1		
1911	Albion	3–2	2–2	1st	
1912	Albion	3–3	2–2		
Albion (Michigan Intercollegiate Athletic Association) (1915–1920)
1915	Albion	5–1–1	4–0–1	T–1st	
1916	Albion	4–2–1	3–1		
1917	Albion	3–3	2–2	3rd	
1918	Albion	6–1	2–0		
1919	Albion	4–3	2–1		
1920	Albion	4–2–2	4–0–1	1st	
Albion:		57–23–8	39–12–5		
Total:		57–23–8			
National championship Conference title Conference division title or championship game berth
