= 1899 Michigan Wolverines football team =

American college football season

1899 Michigan Wolverines football
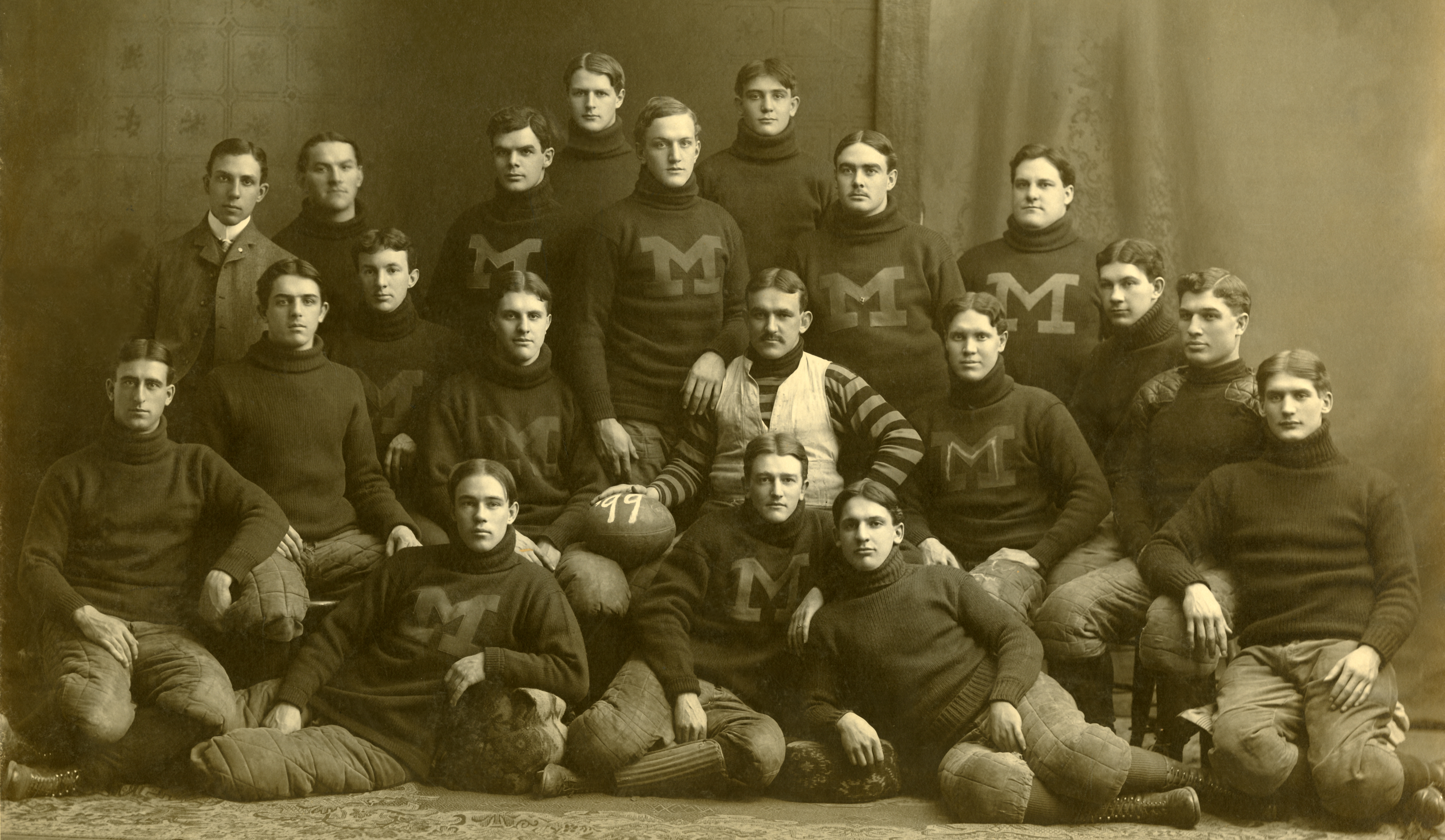
- Conference: Western Conference
- Record: 8–2 (1–1 Western)
- Head coach: Gustave Ferbert (3rd season)
- Captain: Allen Steckle
- Home stadium: Regents Field

1899 Western Conference football standings
	Conf.					Overall
Team	W		L		T	W		L		T
Chicago $	4	–	0	–	0	16	–	0	–	2
Wisconsin	4	–	1	–	0	9	–	2	–	0
Northwestern	2	–	2	–	0	7	–	6	–	0
Michigan	1	–	1	–	0	8	–	2	–	0
Purdue	1	–	2	–	0	4	–	4	–	1
Minnesota	0	–	3	–	0	6	–	3	–	2
Illinois	0	–	3	–	0	3	–	5	–	1
$ – Conference champion

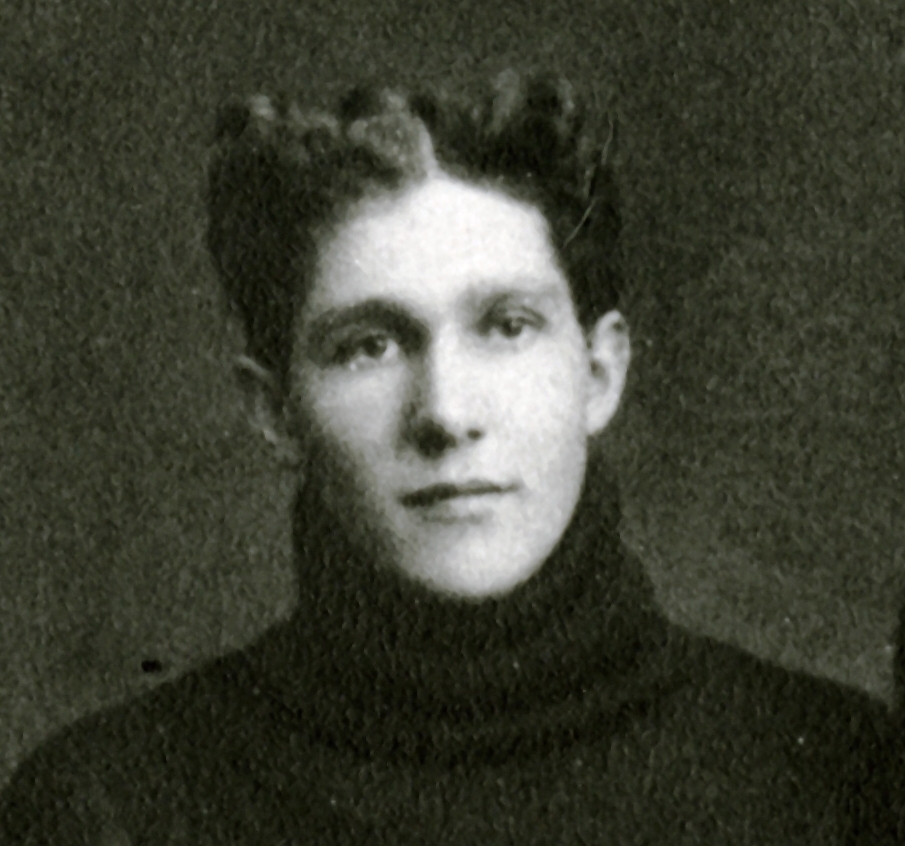
All-American halfback John McLean also won a silver medal as a hurdler in the 1900 Summer Olympics.

The 1899 Michigan Wolverines football team was an American football team that represented the University of Michigan in the 1899 Western Conference football season. In their third and final season under head coach Gustave Ferbert, the team compiled an 8–2 record (1–1 against conference opponents), tied for third in the Western Conference, and outscored opponents by a total of 176 to 43.

The team opened the season with seven consecutive shutouts, outscoring opponents in those contests by a total of 109 to 0. However, Michigan finished the season by going 2–2 in its final four games, losing to Penn and Wisconsin. After the 1899 season, Ferbert resigned as Michigan's head coach to travel to Alaska to participate in the Klondike Gold Rush.

Allen Steckle was the team captain. Leo J. Keena was the team's leading scorer with 32 points on five touchdowns (five points each) and seven goals from touchdown (one point each). Three Michigan players were named to the 1899 College Football All-America Team, as selected by The Philadelphia Inquirer: end Neil Snow, halfback John McLean, and tackle Richard France. Snow, McLean, and France were also named to the 1899 All-Western college football team.

== Schedule ==
Date	Opponent	Site	Result	Attendance
September 30	Hillsdale*	Regents Field; Ann Arbor, MI	W 11–0	
October 7	Albion*	Regents Field; Ann Arbor, MI	W 26–0	
October 14	Western Reserve*	Regents Field; Ann Arbor, MI	W 17–0	
October 18	Notre Dame*	Regents Field; Ann Arbor, MI (rivalry)	W 12–0	2,000
October 21	Alumni (exhibition)*^{†}	Regents Field; Ann Arbor, MI	T 0–0	
October 28	at Illinois	Illinois Field; Champaign, IL (rivalry)	W 5–0	1,000
November 4	vs. Virginia*	Bennett Park; Detroit, MI	W 38–0	2,500–3,000
November 11	at Penn*	Franklin Field; Philadelphia, PA	L 10–11	
November 18	Case*	Regents Field; Ann Arbor, MI	W 28–6	
November 25	Kalamazoo*	Regents Field; Ann Arbor, MI	W 24–0	400
November 30	vs. Wisconsin	West Side Park; Chicago, IL	L 5–17	18,000
*Non-conference game; ^{†}Homecoming

== Game summaries ==
=== Game 1: Hillsdale ===
Hillsdale at Michigan

Team	1	2	Total
Hillsdale	0	0	0
• Michigan	11	0	11

- Date: September 30
- Location: Regents Field, Ann Arbor, MI

On September 30, 1899, Michigan defeated Hillsdale by an 11–0 score at Regents Field in Ann Arbor. Fullback Leo J. Keena scored Michigan's first touchdown less than two minutes into the game, and the kick for goal was unsuccessful. J. Elliott McAfee scored Michigan's second touchdown, still in the first half, and Keena kicked the goal from touchdown. Neither team scored in the second half The game was played halves of 20 and 15 minutes.

=== Game 2: Albion ===
Albion at Michigan

Team	1	2	Total
Albion	0	0	0
• Michigan	15	11	26

- Date: October 7
- Location: Regents Field, Ann Arbor, MI

On October 7, 1899, Michigan defeated Albion by a 26–0 score at Regents Field in Ann Arbor. Michigan scored three touchdowns in the first half on runs of 18 yards by Clayton Teetzel and 22 yards by Everett Sweeley, and an 85-yard punt return by Arthur Fitzgerald. Michigan missed on all three kicks for goal in the first half and led, 15–0, at halftime. Michigan scored two more touchdowns in the second half, the first on a short run by Ebin Wilson with Neil Snow kicking the goal. Michigan's final touchdown was scored by Albert E. Herrnstein on a 45-yard run. The kick for goal was unsuccessful. The game was played in 20-minute halves.

=== Game 3: Western Reserve ===
Western Reserve at Michigan

Team	1	2	Total
Western Reserve	0	0	0
• Michigan	6	11	17

- Date: October 14
- Location: Regents Field, Ann Arbor, MI

On October 14, 1899, Michigan defeated Western Reserve by a 17–0 score at Regents Field in Ann Arbor. After 15 minutes of play in the first half, right tackle Allen Steckle scored a touchdown on a short run, and Neil Snow kicked the goal. In the second half, Charles Frank Juttner, a substitute right tackle, scored on a "revolving play" from the one-yard line, and Snow again kicked the goal. Michigan scored a third touchdown when fullback Everett Sweeley recovered a fumble and returned it 20 yards for a touchdown. Snow's kick for goal was unsuccessful. The game was played in halves of 25 and 20 minutes.

=== Game 4: Notre Dame ===
Notre Dame at Michigan

Team	1	2	Total
Notre Dame	0	0	0
• Michigan	6	6	12

- Date: October 18
- Location: Regents Field, Ann Arbor, MI

On October 18, 1899, Michigan defeated Notre Dame by a 12–0 score before a crowd of 2,000 spectators at Regents Field in Ann Arbor. The field was soft and slippery from heavy rain that fell the day before the game. Both teams played "plain football with a little punting". Michigan scored its first touchdown when Albert E. Herrnstein blocked a Notre Dame punt, Charles Frank Juttner fell on the ball, and Leo J. Keena then scored on a short run. John McLean scored Michigan's other touchdown in the second half. Neil Snow kicked both goals from touchdown. Clayton Teetzel also had runs of 45 and 40 yards in the second half. The game was played in halves of 25 and 20 minutes.

=== Game 5: Michigan alumni ===
Alumni game

Team	1	2	Total
Michigan alumni	0	0	0
Michigan	0	0	0

- Date: October 21
- Location: Regents Field, Ann Arbor, MI

On October 21, 1899, Michigan played its annual exhibition game with an alumni team made up of Michigan players from prior years. A large crowd that included university president James Burrill Angell attended the game at Regents Field. The game, played in 20-minute halves, ended in a scoreless tie. The alumni team included H. G. Hadden (left end), Frederick W. Henninger (left tackle), Richard France (left guard), Edwin Denby (center), Horace Greely Prettyman (right guard), John W. F. Bennett (right end), William Wilson Talcott (quarterback), Gustave Ferbert (left halfback), Charles Widman (right halfback), and John A. Bloomingston (fullback).

=== Game 6: at Illinois ===
Michigan at Illinois

Team	1	2	Total
• Michigan	0	5	5
Illinois	0	0	0

- Date: October 28
- Location: Illinois Field, Champaign, IL
- Game attendance: 1,000

On October 28, 1899, Michigan defeated Illinois by a 5–0 score before a crowd of 1,000 spectators at Illinois Field in Champaign, Illinois. After a scoreless first half, right tackle Charles McDonald scored a touchdown on a short run to cap a 50-yard drive. Charles E. Street returned a punt 75 yards. Leo J. Keena had two punts blocked, but kicked another one 50 yards. Michigan's defensive play was outstanding. After Illinois blocked a punt, it gained possession at Michigan's five-yard line, and a holding penalty moved the ball half the distance further toward the goal line. Michigan stopped the Illini on four consecutive downs. The game was played in 30-minute halves.

=== Game 7: vs. Virginia ===
Virginia at Michigan

Team	1	2	Total
Virginia	0	0	0
• Michigan	16	22	38

- Date: November 4
- Location: Bennett Park, Detroit
- Game attendance: 2,500–3,000

On November 4, 1899, Michigan defeated Virginia by a 38–0 score at Bennett Park in Detroit. Two special trains from Ann Arbor delivered the football team, band, and students to Detroit's Michigan Central Station on the morning of the game. The Michigan fans, described the Detroit Free Press as a "megaphone brigade", paraded loudly through the streets of Detroit before the game.

The playing field at Bennett Park was in good condition despite snow and rain that fell the prior day. The game began at 3:45 p.m. Michigan tallied three touchdowns in the first half and four in the second half. Michigan's touchdowns were scored by Richard France, Hugh White (two), Clark Leiblee, Allen Steckle (two), and Charles McDonald. Neil Snow kicked three goals from touchdown. The game was played in 30-minute halves. The game was attended by between 2,500 and 3,000 people.

=== Game 8: at Penn ===
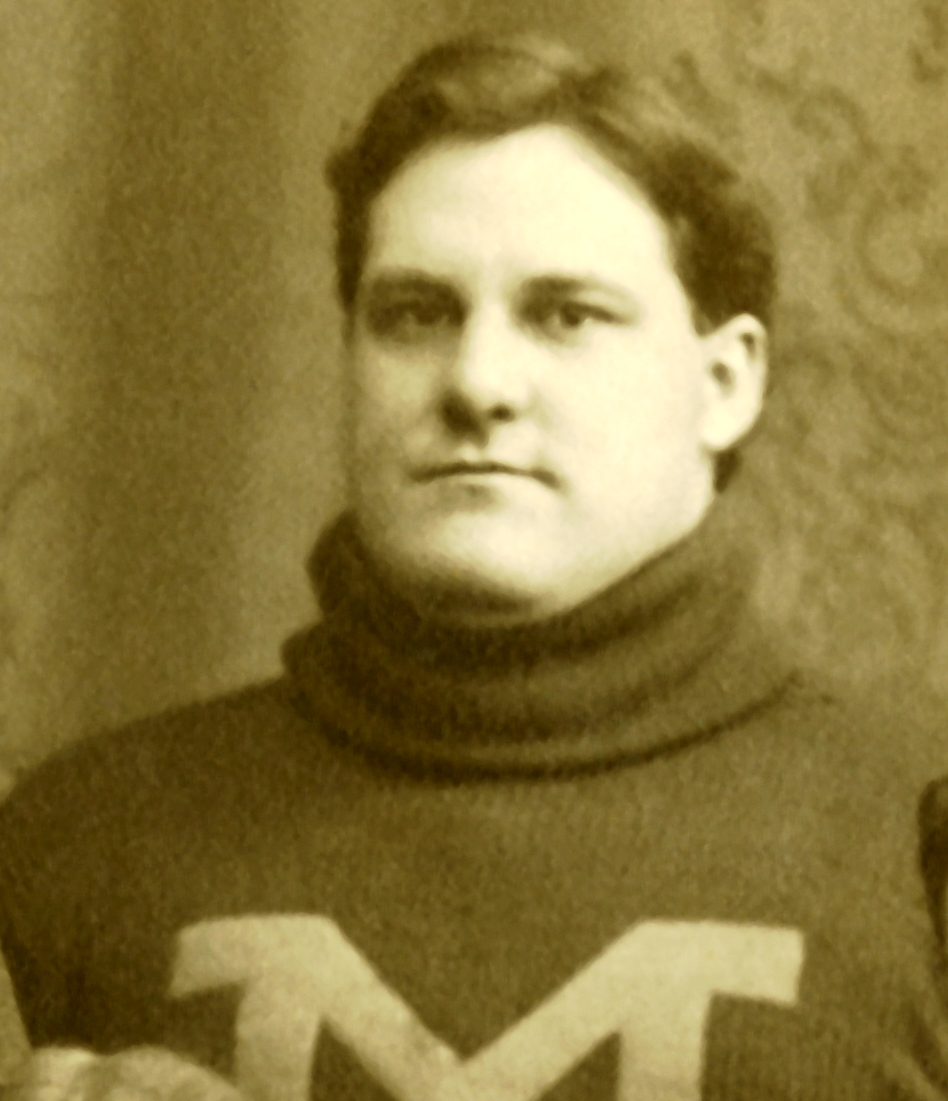
All-American center William Cunningham faced Penn's Pete Overfield in 1899.

Michigan traveled to Philadelphia to play the University of Pennsylvania Quakers on November 11, 1899. At the time, Penn was one of the three top football teams in the country. Michigan scored first on a 22-yard touchdown run by John McLean around Penn's left end. Neil Snow missed the kick for the goal after touchdown, and Michigan led 5 to 0 at halftime. Penn's All-American Truxtun Hare scored a touchdown in the second half (also missing its goal after touchdown attempt) to tie the score at 5 to 5. Michigan re-took the lead when McLean and Allen Steckle carried the ball to Pennsylvania's ten-yard line, and Michigan tackle, Charles McDonald, then carried the ball over the goal line for Michigan's second touchdown. Michigan's Everett Sweeley missed the goal after touchdown, and Michigan led 10 to 5. With less than seven minutes left in the game, Hare scored his second touchdown of the game, and Pete Overfield kicked the goal after touchdown to give the Quakers the win with a final score of 11 to 10.

Although Michigan lost by a final score of 12 to 11 on Penn's Franklin Field, the Wolverines gained national respect with a good showing against the Quakers. The New York Times reported on the results of the game as follows:

"The game was a royal battle from start to finish, and was marked by both brilliant and poor playing by both teams. Pennsylvania earned her victory because she had to play harder for her two touch-downs than did Michigan. The latter team, although beaten, was not disgraced, for the Western boys made their Eastern rivals work hard for every inch of ground they gained. ... The game was a beautiful one for the spectators to look at. Both teams were about as evenly matched as they could be. The Quakers excelled in line bucking and in kicking, while Michigan far outplayed Pennsylvania when it came to skirting the ends. McLean, Michigan's left half back, was almost invariably used for end running, and his brilliant sprinting around Pennsylvania's ends often brought applause from the followers of the Quakers. The interference accorded him was almost perfect, and this, in a great measure, helped him in gaining ground."

The game also featured a duel between two of the best centers in the country, Penn's Pete Overfield and Michigan's William Cunningham. Cunningham was Michigan's first ever All-American in 1898, when he was selected as a first-team All-American by Caspar Whitney, and Overfield was picked by Walter Camp as the first-team All-American of 1898. The New York Times reported on the match-up of Cunningham and Overfield as follows: "The duel between Cunningnam and Overfield, the centre rushes, was interesting. Both are high-class players, and they played with a dash that was inspiring. Cunningham had much the better of it during the first half, but in the second period Overfield, through better staying qualities, made big holes through Michigan's bulky centre."

=== Game 9: Case ===
Case at Michigan

Team	1	2	Total
Case	6	0	6
• Michigan	5	23	28

- Date: November 18
- Location: Regents Field, Ann Arbor, MI

On November 18, 1899, Michigan defeated Case Scientific School by a 28–6 score at Regents Field in Ann Arbor. Michigan played several substitutes in the first half, and Case took a 6–0 lead on a 40-yard touchdown run by Sullivan. Later in the first half, Leo J. Keena ran 20 yards for a touchdown, and Case led, 6–5, at halftime. Michigan's starters, including John McLean and Charles Street, were put into the game in the second half, and the Wolverines scored 23 unanswered points during that period. McLean started the second-half scoring with a 28-yard touchdown run. Additional touchdowns were scored by Charles McDonald, Allen Steckle, and Charles Juttner. Keena kicked three goals from touchdown for Michigan. The game was played in 25-minute halves.

=== Game 10: Kalamazoo ===
Kalamazoo at Michigan

Team	1	2	Total
Kalamazoo	0	0	0
• Michigan	6	18	24

- Date: November 25
- Location: Regents Field, Ann Arbor, MI
- Game attendance: 400

On November 25, 1899, Michigan defeated Kalamazoo by a 24–0 score before 400 spectators at Regents Field in Ann Arbor. Leo J. Keena scored a touchdown for Michigan in the first half, and Michigan led, 6–0, at halftime. Keena scored another touchdown in the second half, and additional touchdowns were scored by Milo White and Everett Sweeley. Keena kicked three goals from touchdown, and Sweeley kicked one. The game was played in halves of 30 and 20 minutes.

=== Game 11: vs. Wisconsin ===
On Thanksgiving Day, November 30, 1899, Michigan lost to Wisconsin by a 17–5 score before 22,000 spectators at West Side Park in Chicago. Excursion trains brought fans from Wisconsin and Michigan, and the brass bands from both schools also attended. Wisconsin won in large part due to the kicking of Pat O'Dea. O'Dea accounted for five points with a field goal from the 35-yard line and kicked a long punt to McLean which was fumbled behind the goal line where it was recovered by Wisconsin for a touchdown. O'Dea was later ejected from the game for slugging. Wisconsin's weak spot in the game was at left end, where Eddie Cochems gave up many long runs by Michigan, including the Wolverines' lone touchdown on a 45-yard run by McLean.

There were reports that Michigan's strategy was to put O'Dea out of the game, and he was subjected to a number of rough hits by Richard France and William Cunningham. On one play, France "came into him like a battering ram after he had punted the ball." O'Dea warned France that if he did it again "there would be trouble." After another punt, France came for O'Dea again, and O'Dea slugged France in the face. A Wisconsin newspaper account described the incident as follows: "Meantime O'Dea had been laying out France, hitting him with such force that the big guard was stretched out and but for the time gained through the wrangle at the end of the goal line and the speedy ending of the half, would hardly have been able to continue playing. O'Dea claimed that the knockout blow was accidental." The game's referee saw the blow, and O'Dea was ejected from the game.

=== After the season ===
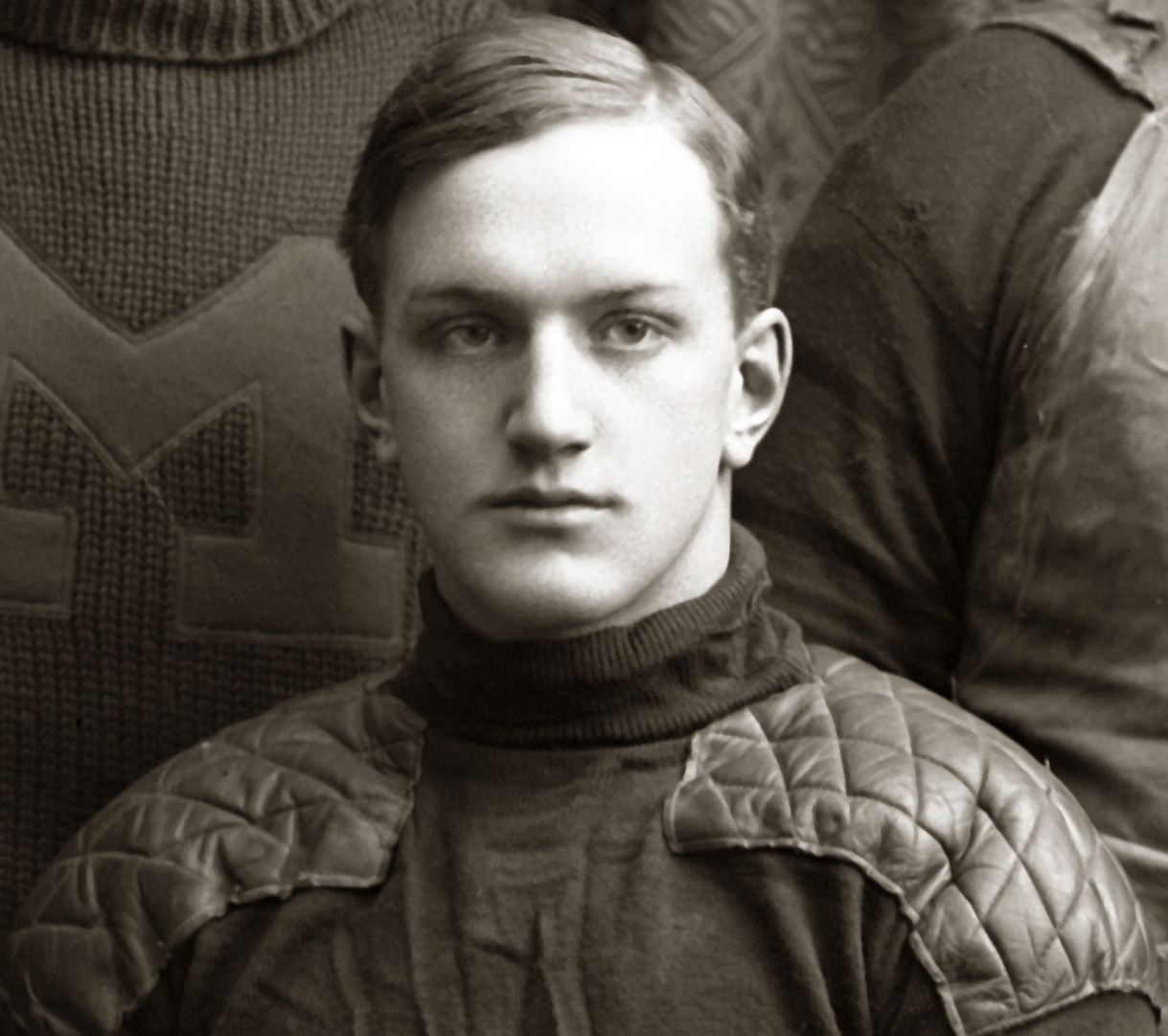
End Neil Snow scored five touchdowns in the first Rose Bowl game.

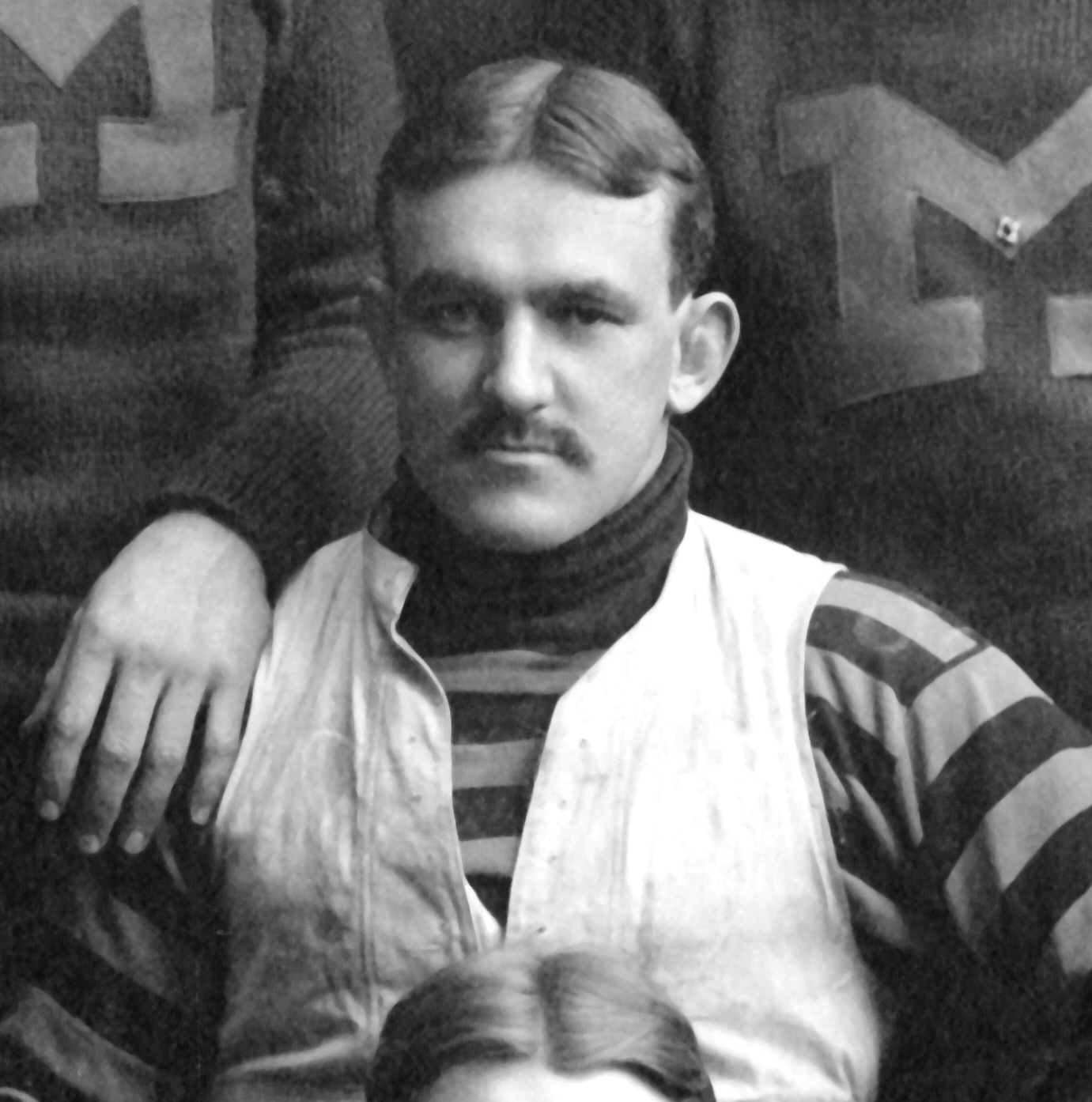
Tackle and 1899 team captain Allen Steckle later became a collegiate coach.

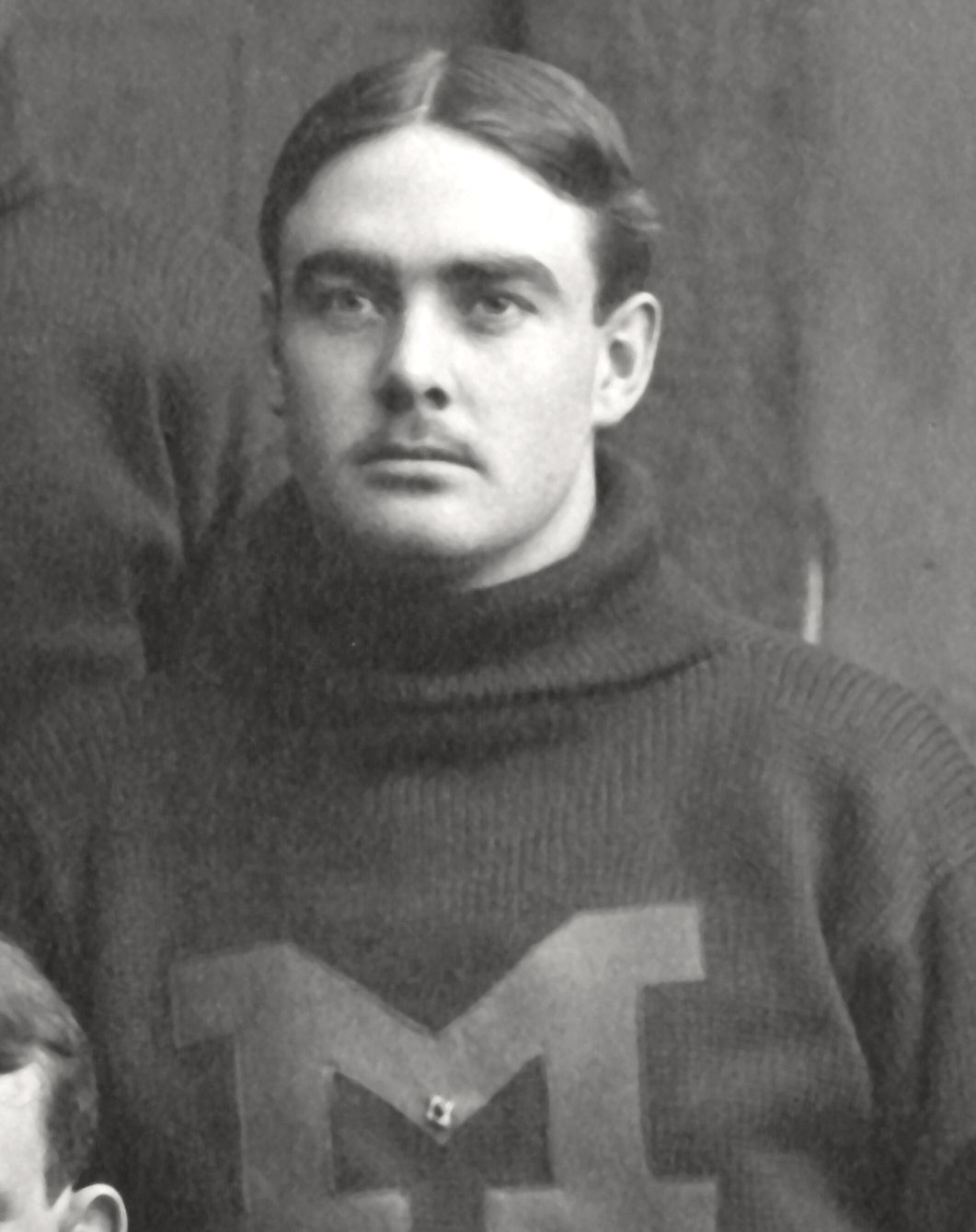
The rough play of Richard France (pictured) prompted a punch from Wisconsin's Pat O'Dea, leading to O'Dea's ejection from the 1899 championship game.

Prior to 1898, no player from a "Western" school had been selected as a college football All-American. William Cunningham became Michigan's first All-American in 1898. The 1899 College Football All-America Team, as selected by the Philadelphia Inquirer, included three Michigan players:

- Neil Snow – Snow played at the end position for the 1899 Wolverines and repeated as an All-American in 1901. One of the great athletes in the history of the University of Michigan, Snow won more varsity letters than any other athlete (four each in baseball, football and track) in the school's history, scored five touchdowns in the first Rose Bowl game in 1902, and was inducted into the College Football Hall of Fame in 1960.
- John McLean – McLean played halfback for the 1899 Wolverines. He was also a gifted track athlete. The following summer, he represented the United States and the 1900 Summer Olympics in Paris, where he won the silver medal in the 110 metre hurdles with a time of 15.5 seconds. He went on to coach the Knox College and University of Missouri football teams.
- Richard France – France played at the tackle position for the 1899 Wolverines. In addition to his selection as an All-American by the Philadelphia Inquirer, France was also a consensus All-Western player in 1899.

After the 1899 season, Ferbert resigned as Michigan's head coach to travel to Alaska to participate in the Klondike Gold Rush. He returned from Alaska several years later as a millionaire.

== Personnel ==
=== Varsity letter winners ===
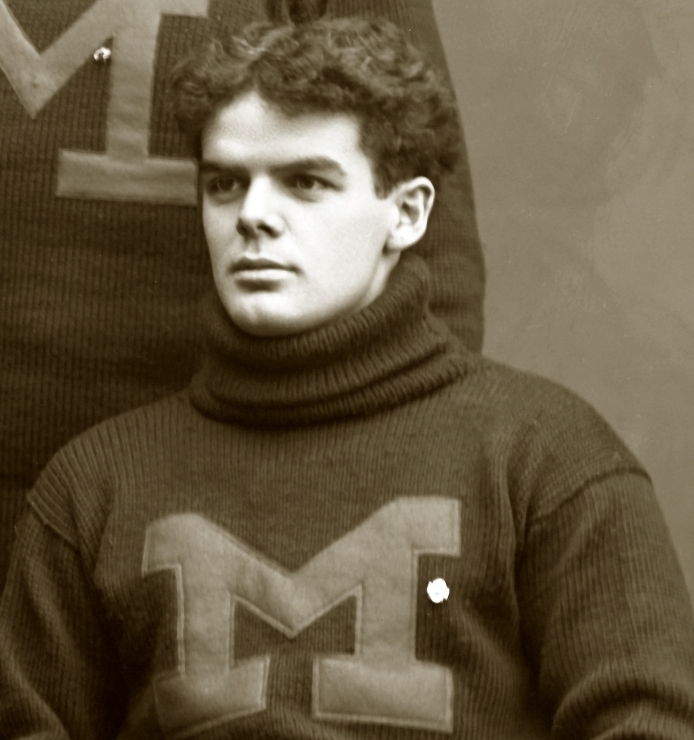
Fullback Leo J. Keena

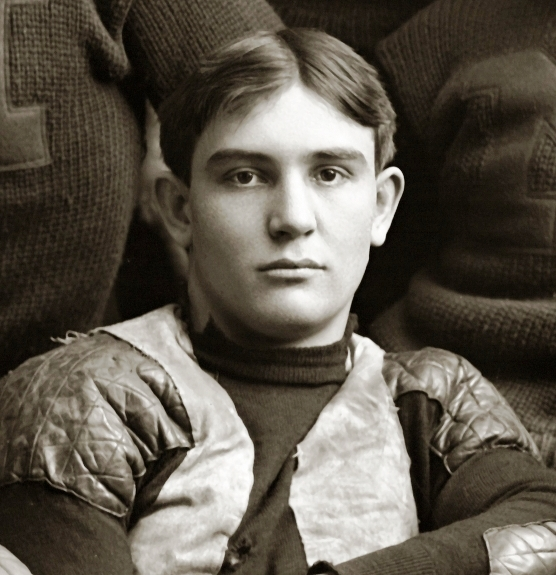
Fullback Everett Sweeley set the college football record in 1902 when he kicked the football 86 yards in the air before the ball touched the ground

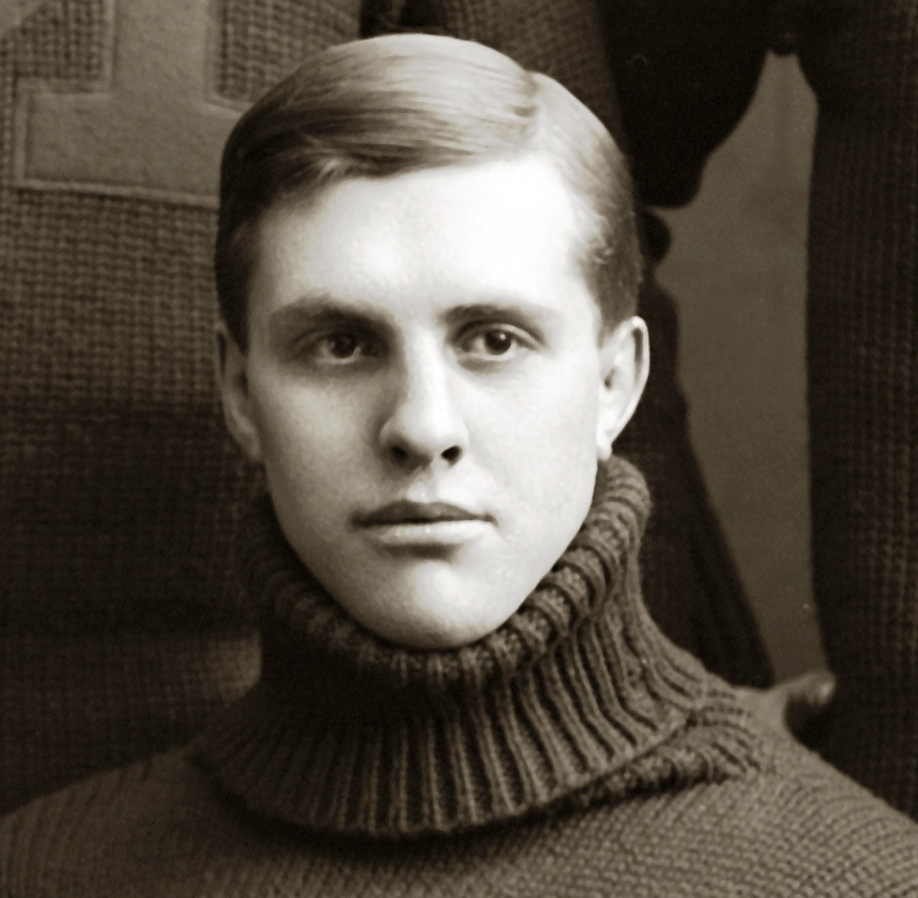
Tackle Hugh White later captained the 1901 team that outscored opponents 550–0 and became known as the "Point-a-Minute" team.

The following 13 players received varsity "M" letters for their participation on the 1899 football team:

- William Cunningham, Grove City, Pennsylvania – started 7 games at center
- Richard France, Decatur, Indiana – started 1 game at left tackle, 1 game at left guard, 1 game at right guard
- David D. Gill, Pittsburgh – started 4 games at left end
- Leo J. Keena – started 4 games at fullback, 2 games at left halfback, 2 games at right halfback
- Charles G. McDonald, Fremont, Nebraska – started 4 games at left tackle, 2 games at right tackle
- John McLean, Menominee, Michigan – started 5 games at left halfback
- Ard Ezra Richardson, Jackson, Michigan – started 2 games at fullback
- Rudolph J. Siegmund, Huntington, Indiana – started 7 games at right guard, 2 games at left guard
- Neil Snow, Detroit, Michigan – started 7 games at right end
- Allen Steckle, Freeport, Michigan – started 7 games at right tackle
- Charles E. Street, Lee, Massachusetts (Williams College) – started 6 games at quarterback
- Everett Sweeley, Sioux City, Iowa – started 1 game at fullback, 1 game at left halfback, 1 game at right halfback
- Hugh White, Lapeer, Michigan – started 3 games at left end, 1 game at right guard, 1 game at right end

=== Reserves ===
- Walter G. Bain, Ann Arbor, Michigan – halfback
- Lee Barkenbus, Kalamazoo, MI – started 2 games at left guard
- Charles F. Bliss, Durham, Maine – started 1 game at left guard
- Arthur D. Brookfield, Englewood, Illinois – tackle
- George G. Burns, Fremont, Michigan – started 1 game at left end, 1 game at right end
- John Dickey, Niles, Michigan – started 3 games at center
- Godlove Orth Dietz, Gilman, Illinois – tackle
- Harry Shurtleff Durant, Chicago – fullback
- Arthur M. Fitzgerald, Springfield, Illinois – started 2 games at quarterback
- Allen Wynand Gardener – quarterback
- George S. Herr, Waterbury, Connecticut – started 1 game at quarterback
- Charles Frank Juttner, Powers, Michigan – started 2 games at left tackle, 2 games at left end
- Samuel Kelley, Knobnoster, Missouri – guard
- Rutherford B. H. Kramer, Elgin, Illinois – started 3 games at left guard
- J. Elliott McAfee – started 1 game at left halfback
- Curtis C. Mechling, Dayton, OH – end
- Carl Mohr, Walled Lake, IA – quarterback
- Elisha Elijah Sayed (Sayad?), Ann Arbor, Michigan – tackle
- Walter W. Shaw, Kansas City, Missouri – quarterback
- Harrison S. "Boss" Weeks, Allegan, Michigan – halfback
- Milo A. White, Fremont, MI – started 2 games at fullback
- Ebin Wilson, Lapeer, Michigan – started 3 games at left tackle, 1 game at right guard
- Jesse Lansing Yont, Anamosa, Iowa – tackle

=== Others ===
- Albert E. Herrnstein, Chillicothe, Ohio – started 3 games at right halfback, 1 game at left halfback (listed as a "substitute")
- Richard Juttner – started 1 game at right tackle, 1 game at fullback
- John (Lewis?) Larsen – started 1 game at left guard
- Clark Leiblee, Rochester, NY – started 2 games at right halfback
- Thomas R. Marks, Indianapolis, IN – tackle (listed as a "substitute")
- Christian E. McNemar, Lexington, IL – started 1 game at right end
- Clayton Teetzel, Chicago, IL – started 2 games at right halfback

=== Scoring leaders ===
Player	Touchdowns	Extra points	Field goals	Total
Leo J. Keena	5	7	0	32
Charles McDonald	4	0	0	20
John McLean	4	0	0	20
Allen Steckle	4	0	0	20
Everett Sweeley	3	1	0	16
Charles Juttner	2	0	0	10
Hugh White	2	0	0	10
Neil Snow	0	8	0	8
Arthur Fitzgerald	1	0	0	5
Richard France	1	0	0	5
Albert E. Herrnstein	1	0	0	5
Clark Leiblee	1	0	0	5
J. Elliott McAfee	1	0	0	5
Clayton Teetzel	1	0	0	5
Milo White	1	0	0	5
Ebin Wilson	1	0	0	5
Total	32	16	0	176

=== Coaching and training staff ===
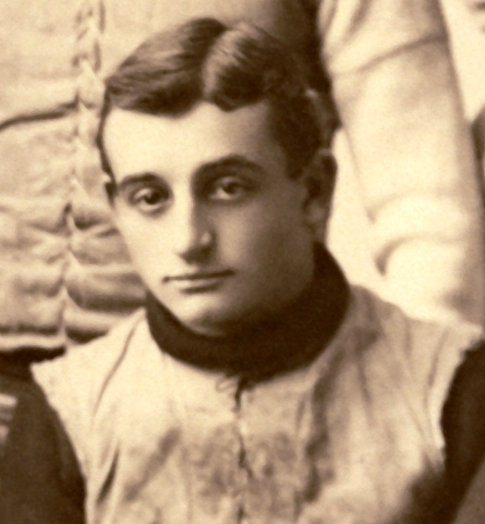
Head coach Gustave Ferbert left for the Klondike Gold Rush after the 1899 football season.

- Head coach: Gustave Ferbert (Class of 1897)
- Assistant coaches: John R. Duffy (Class of 1891), H. G. Hadden (Class of 1895), Frederick W. Henninger (Class of 1897)
- Graduate manager: Charles A. Baird (Class of 1894)
- Student manager: Leonard D. Verdier (Class of 1901)
- Assistant student manager: Harry K. Crafts (Class of 1901)
