= 1899 Chicago Maroons football team =

American college football season

1899 Chicago Maroons football
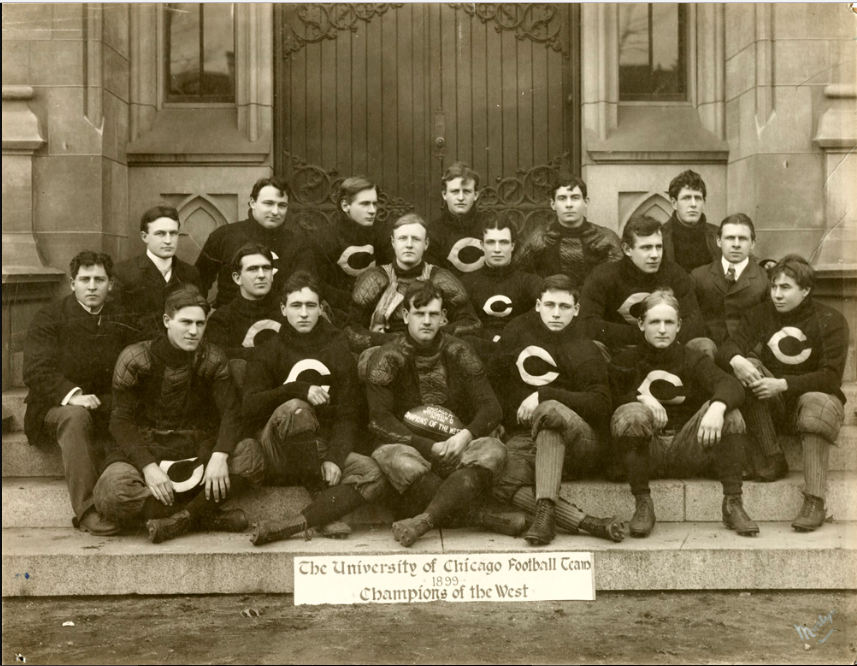

Western Conference champion
- Conference: Western Conference
- Record: 16–0–2 (4–0 Western)
- Head coach: Amos Alonzo Stagg (8th season)
- Base defense: 7–2–2
- Captain: Walter S. Kennedy
- Home stadium: Marshall Field

1899 Western Conference football standings
	Conf.					Overall
Team	W		L		T	W		L		T
Chicago $	4	–	0	–	0	16	–	0	–	2
Wisconsin	4	–	1	–	0	9	–	2	–	0
Northwestern	2	–	2	–	0	7	–	6	–	0
Michigan	1	–	1	–	0	8	–	2	–	0
Purdue	1	–	2	–	0	4	–	4	–	1
Minnesota	0	–	3	–	0	6	–	3	–	2
Illinois	0	–	3	–	0	3	–	5	–	1
$ – Conference champion

The 1899 Chicago Maroons football team represented the University of Chicago during the 1899 college football season and won the Western Conference championship.

In their eighth season under head coach Amos Alonzo Stagg, the Maroons compiled a 16–0–2 overall record, which included four practice games against high school football teams. In intercollegiate games, the Maroons compiled a 12–0–2 record and a 4–0 record against Western Conference opponents. The only two blemishes were tie games with Iowa and Penn. The Maroons shut out 13 opponents, scored 505 points (28.1 points per game), and allowed only 28 points on defense (1.6 points per game).

The Maroons played their first 17 games at home on Marshall Field in Chicago. The final game of the season was a post-season match against Wisconsin at Randall Field in Madison, Wisconsin. Chicago defeated Wisconsin by a 17–0 score to claim the undisputed championship of the Western Conference.

== Schedule ==
Date	Opponent	Site	Result	Attendance
September 9	Englewood HS (Note: The first four games of the season against high school team were not included in the listing of official games in the 1900 Cap & Gown yearbook. See 1900 Cap & Gown, p. 192, listing the team's official record as 12–0–2.)*	Marshall Field; Chicago, IL	W 2–0	
September 15	Hyde Park HS*	Marshall Field; Chicago, IL	W 12–0	
September 16	West Division HS*	Marshall Field; Chicago, IL	W 39–0	
September 20	Englewood HS*	Marshall Field; Chicago, IL	W 45–0	
September 23	Knox (IL)*	Marshall Field; Chicago, IL	W 40–0	
September 30	Physicians & Surgeons*	Marshall Field; Chicago, IL	W 12–0	
October 4	Notre Dame*	Marshall Field; Chicago, IL	W 23–6	
October 7	Iowa*	Marshall Field; Chicago, IL	T 5–5	
October 11	Dixon*	Marshall Field; Chicago, IL	W 29–0	
October 14	Cornell*	Marshall Field; Chicago, IL	W 17–6	6,000
October 21	Oberlin*	Marshall Field; Chicago, IL	W 58–0	2,500
October 28	Penn*	Marshall Field; Chicago, IL	T 5–5	8,000
November 4	Purdue	Marshall Field; Chicago, IL (rivalry)	W 44–0	2,500
November 11	Northwestern	Marshall Field; Chicago, IL	W 76–0	3,000
November 18	Beloit*	Marshall Field; Chicago, IL	W 35–0	2,000
November 25	Minnesota	Marshall Field; Chicago, IL	W 29–0	8,000
November 30	Brown*	Marshall Field; Chicago, IL	W 17–6	10,000
December 9	at Wisconsin	Randall Field; Madison, WI	W 17–0	9,000
*Non-conference game

== Game summaries ==
=== Games 1-4: Practice games against high schools ===
Chicago opened its 1899 season with four practice matches against high school teams, all played at Chicago's Marshall Field. The Maroons won all four games by a combined score of 98 to 0.

=== Game 5: Knox ===
On September 23, 1899, Chicago opened its intercollegiate football season with a 40–0 victory over the team from Knox College. The game began at 3:45 p.m. and was played at Marshall Field in halves of 25 and 20 minutes. Henry scored three touchdowns, and Slaker, Hamill, Wellington, and Feil scored one touchdown each. Kennedy kicked five goals from touchdown. Hamill's touchdown was scored on a run of 102 yards, the longest run in Marshall Field history to that point. Chicago's lineup against Knox was Rich (left end), Wellington and Sheldon (left tackle), Feil (left guard), C. Webb (center), Cooke (right guard), J. Webb (right tackle), Cassels (right end), Kennedy (quarterback), Hamill and Horton (left halfback), Henry (right halfback), and Slaker (fullback).

=== Game 6: Physicians & Surgeons ===
On September 30, 1899, Chicago defeated the team from the College of Physicians & Surgeons by a 12–0 score. The game was played in 25-minute halves at Marshall Field. Slaker and Hamill each scored a touchdown, and Kennedy kicked two goals from touchdown. Henry and two Physicians & Surgeons players were ejected from the game for unnecessary roughness. Chicago's lineup against the Physicians & Surgeons was Cassels (left end), Webb (left tackle), Ervin and Ahlswede (left guard), Speed (center), Cooke and Feil (right guard), Wellington (right tackle), Kennedy (quarterback), Hamill (right halfback), Henry (left halfback), and Slaker (fullback).

=== Game 7: Notre Dame ===
On October 4, 1899, Chicago played a midweek game against Notre Dame. The Maroons won by a 23–6 score at Marshall Field. Slaker and Hamill scored two touchdowns each for Chicago, and Kennedy kicked three goals from touchdown. Hamill's play was reported to be "the feature of the game" as he twice had runs of over 100 yards. Chicago's starting lineup against Notre Dame was Sheldon, Rich and Place (left end), Wellington (left tackle), Ahlswede and Cook (left guard), Speed and C. Webb (center), Feil and Erwin (right guard), Webb (right tackle), Cassels (right end), Kennedy and Henry (quarterback), Hamill (right halfback), Henry and Horton (left halfback), and Slaker (fullback).

=== Game 8: Iowa ===
On October 7, 1899, Chicago played to a 5–5 tie against Iowa that finished the season undefeated with an 8–0–1 record. The Chicago Sunday Tribune called it "one of the finest exhibitions of defensive football seen in a long time," as the Maroons twice held the Hawkeyes on drives that penetrated inside the Chicago five-yard line. Chicago, playing without its captain Kennedy, was unable to score a touchdown and tallied its five points on a field goal by Henry. Chicago's lineup against Iowa was Sheldon (left end), Wellington (left tackle), Flannagan and Feil (left guard), Speed (center), Ahlswede (right guard), Webb (right tackle), Cassells (right end), Holste (quarterback), Hamill (right halfback), Henry (left halfback), and Slaker (fullback).

=== Game 9: Dixon ===
On October 11, 1889, Chicago played a midweek game against the team from Dixon College and Normal School in Dixon, Illinois. The Maroons won the game, played in 25-minute halves, by a 29–0 score at Marshall Field. Chicago played mostly substitutes in the game. Ervin at fullback scored two touchdowns, while Ahlswede and Rich each scored once. Henry kicked four goals from touchdown and one field goal. Chicago's lineup against Dixon was Sheldon and Holste (left end), Feil (left tackle), Flannagan (left guard), Speed and C. Webb (center), Ahlswede (right guard), Cook (right tackle), Rich (right end), Henry (quarterback), Place (right halfback), Horton and Lewis (left halfback), Ervin (fullback).

=== Game 10: Cornell ===
On October 14, 1899, Chicago defeated Cornell by a 17–6 score. The game was played at Marshall Field to a crowd of 6,000 persons. One Chicago newspaper account called the game "a triumph of the West over the East; a demonstration of the effectiveness of the style of football played in this section of the country." Slaker scored two touchdowns for Chicago, and Wellington scored another. Henry kicked two goals from touchdown. Raymond Starbuck scored a touchdown for Cornell. Chicago's lineup against Cornell was Sheldon (left end), Webb (left tackle), Flannagan (left guard), Speed (center), Ahlswede (right guard), Feil (right tackle), Cassels (right end), Henry (quarterback), Wellington (left halfback), Hamill (right halfback), and Slaker (fullback).

=== Game 11: Oberlin ===
On October 21, 1899, Chicago defeated Oberlin by a 58–0 score. The game was played at Marshall Field to a crowd of 2,500 persons. Of the 58 points scored, 53 were scored in the first half. In the second half, the Maroons made liberal use of substitutes and scored only five points. Chicago touchdowns were scored by Slaker (1), Hamill (3), Henry (2), Wellington (1), Sheldon (1), and Ahlswede (1). Henry kicked eight goals from touchdown and one field goal. Chicago's lineup against Oberlin was Sheldon (left end), Feil (left tackle), Flannagan (left guard), Speed (center), Ahlswede (right guard), Webb (right tackle), Cassels and Rich (right end), Henry and Holste (quarterback), Hamill (right halfback), Wellington and Snyder (left halfback), and Slaker (fullback).

=== Game 12: Penn ===
On October 28, 1899, Chicago played Penn to a 5–5 tie before a crowd of 8,000 persons at Marshall Field. The Penn team that traveled to Chicago was one of the Big Four teams from the East with a lineup that included four first-team All-Americans: quarterback John H. Outland [namesake of the Outland Trophy], center Pete Overfield, halfback Josiah McCracken, and guard Truxtun Hare. Each team scored a touchdown, Davidson for Penn and Wellington scoring late in the second half for Chicago. Henry missed a kick for goal from touchdown that would have given Chicago a victory. Chicago gained twice as many yards as Penn and twice had drives stopped inside Penn's three-yard line. Kennedy missed two attempts at field goals from placement.

The game was reportedly marred only by "incessant coaching" from the Penn sideline; the conduct was met with "hissing" from the crowd. On one occasion the umpire had to chase an old Penn player off the field, and on another occasion, one of the Quakers was taken from the field by a police officer. After the game, the umpire declared the actions of the Penn coaches to be "ungentlemanly."

Despite the controversy over coaching, press accounts referenced the game as a spectacle. The Times of Philadelphia proclaimed: "Never has Marshall Field been the scene of a more bitter struggle; never have two athletic forces contended with more heroic courage in the Western metropolis, and never a greater foot-ball battle witnessed in the West than today's Pennsylvania-Chicago game." The Sunday Inter Ocean reported: "Never before has such an exciting game of football been played in Chicago. Never before has a crowd of spectators on Marshall field been wrought up to such a pitch of mad enthusiasm."

Chicago's lineup against Penn was Henry (left end), Feil (left tackle), Flannagan (left guard), Speed (center), Ahlswede (right guard), Webb (right tackle), Cassels (right end), Kennedy (quarterback), Wellington (left halfback), Hamill (right halfback), and Slaker (fullback).

=== Game 13: Purdue ===
On November 4, 1899, Chicago defeated Purdue by a 44–0 score. The game was played at Marshall Field before a crowd of 2,500 persons. The Chicago Sunday Tribune described right halfback Ralph Hamill as the star of the game, reporting that he scored four touchdowns (the Sunday Inter Ocean reported he scored five) and "raced up and down the field for touchdowns and long gains continually", including a run of 65 yards. Feil also scored two touchdowns, and Henry scored one. Kennedy converted on four of seven goals after touchdown. Chicago's lineup against Purdue was Henry and Sheldon (left end), Feil (left tackle), Flannagan and Ervin (left guard), Speed and Webb (center), Ahlswede (right guard), Webb (right tackle), Cassells and Rich (right end), Kennedy (quarterback), Eldredge and Henry (left halfback), Hamill (right halfback), and Snyder (fullback).

=== Game 14: Northwestern ===
On November 11, 1899, Chicago defeated Northwestern by a 76–0 score. The game was played before a crowd of almost 3,000 persons at Marshall Field. Slaker scored six touchdowns for Chicago, while Webb and Henry scored two each, and Feil, Hamill, and Ahlswede each scored once. Kennedy converted 11 goals from touchdown. The lineup for Chicago was Eldredge, Schmahl and Sheldon (left end), Feil (left tackle), Ervin (left guard), Speed (center), Ahlswede (right guard), Webb (right tackle), Cassels (right end), Kennedy (quarterback), Hamill (right halfback), Henry (left halfback), and Slaker (fullback).

=== Game 15: Beloit ===
On November 18, 1899, Chicago defeated the team from Beloit College by a 35–0 score. The game was played in halves of 20 and 25 minutes before a crowd of 2,000 persons at Marshall Field. Right halfback Hamill scored three touchdowns, fullback Frank Slaker scored two touchdowns, and quarterback Kennedy scored five goals from touchdown. Chicago's lineup against Beloit was Sheldon (left end), Feil and McNab (left tackle), Flanagan (left guard), Ahlswede (center), Ervin (right guard), Webb (right tackle), Cassells (right end), Kennedy (quarterback), Eldredge and Place (left halfback), Hamill (right halfback), and Slaker and Snyder (fullback).

=== Game 16: Minnesota ===
On November 25, 1899, Chicago played Minnesota at Marshall Field in Chicago before a crowd of 8,000 persons. The game was played in 35-minute halves. Chicago won by a 29–0 score. Chicago's touchdowns (four points each) were scored by Slaker, Cassells, Feil, Place and Hamill. Goals after touchdown were completed by Kennedy (1) and Henry (3).

=== Game 17: Brown ===
On Thanksgiving Day, November 30, 1899, Chicago concluded its regular season schedule with a victory over Brown by a 17–6 score in front of a crowd of 10,000 persons at Marshall Field in Chicago. The game began shortly after 2:30 p.m. and was played in halves of 35 and 30 minutes, the second half having been shortened due to darkness. The Daily Inter Ocean described the game as the "leading social function of the day" with the field a "bedlam of noise" and female Chicago students "out in force with large bows of maroon ribbon dangling from their umbrellas and barrytone tin horns." University of Chicago President William Rainey Harper was seated in a central box in the front row and "showed an intense interest in the game." Chicago scored all 17 of its points in the first half, while Brown did not score until late in the second half as darkness began to fall. Frank Slaker scored two touchdowns for eight Chicago points, and James Henry kicked a field goal and two goals after touchdown for nine Chicago points. Right halfback Richardson scored all six of Brown's points on a touchdown and goal from touchdown. Guard Frederick Feil was called the "particular star" for Chicago, as he broke out of the pile for long gains on multiple occasions. Chicago's lineup against Brown was Sheldon (left end), Feil (left tackle), Ervin and Flannagan (left guard), Speed (center), Ahlswede (right guard), Webb (right tackle), Cassels (right end), Holste and Henry (quarterback) Henry and Eldredge (left halfback), Eldredge and Place (right halfback), and Slaker (fullback).

=== Game 18: at Wisconsin ===
On December 9, 1899, Chicago traveled to Madison, Wisconsin, to play a post-season game against the Wisconsin Badgers for the championship of the Western Conference. The Wisconsin team featured Eddie Cochems at left end, Pat O'Dea at fullback, and Arthur Hale Curtis at right tackle. The game was played in halves of 35 minutes at Randall Field before 8,000 Wisconsin students and locals with 1,000 Chicago supporters in the east bleachers. Chicago won the game by a 17–0 score. Slaker scored two touchdowns for Chicago, Feil scored one. Henry kicked two goals from touchdown. Chicago's lineup against Wisconsin was Sheldon (left end), Lerum and Feil (left tackle), Ahlswede (left guard), Speed (center), Flannagan (right guard), Webb (right tackle), Eldredge (right end), Kennedy (quarterback), Henry (left halfback), Hamill (right halfback), and Slaker (fullback).

== Players ==
=== Varsity letter winners ===
The following 17 players won varsity letters for their participation on the 1899 Chicago football team.

- Herbert Frederick Ahlswede - right guard
- Bert James Cassels - right end
- William Franklin Eldridge - right end
- Charles William Erwin - substitute
- Frederick Feil - left guard
- Charles Gibbons Flanagan - left tackle
- Ralph C. Hamill - right halfback (3rd team All-American selection by Walter Camp; 1st-team All-Western selection by The Northwestern)
- James Ronald Henry - left halfback
- August Fred Holste - substitute
- Walter S. Kennedy - quarterback and captain (2nd team All-American selection by Walter Camp; 1st-team All-Western selection by The Northwestern)
- Ernest de Koven Leffingwell - later a noted Arctic explorer and geologist
- Theron W. Mortimer
- Walter Joseph Schmahl - end
- James Milton Sheldon - left end (1st-team All-Western selection by The Northwestern)
- Frank Louis Slaker - fullback (2nd-team All-American selection by Walter Camp)
- Kellogg Speed - center
- Jonathan Edwards Webb - right tackle (1st-team All-Western selection by The Northwestern)

=== Other players ===
- Edson Benton Cooke - guard
- Frank O. Horton - halfback
- Knox - end
- A. C. Lerum - tackle
- Leon Patterson Lewis - halfback
- James G. MacNab - tackle
- Alfred William Place - end
- Edward Prickett Rich - end
- Alvin Bricker Snider - halfback/fullback
- Charles Julian Webb - center
- Richard Howells "Duke" Wellington - tackle; declared ineligible for academic reasons in early November

== Coaches ==
- Head coach: Amos Alonzo Stagg
- Assistant coaches: Clarence Herschberger (College Football Hall of Fame) and Henry Gordon Gale
- Manager of games: Horace Butterworth
- Trainer: Hiram Boardman Conibear
