= 1899 All-Western college football team =

American all-star college football team

The 1899 All-Western college football team consists of American football players selected to the All-Western teams chosen by various selectors for the 1899 college football season.

== All-Western selections ==
=== Ends ===
- Neil Snow, Michigan (NW) (CFHOF)
- James M. Sheldon, Chicago (NW)

=== Tackles ===
- Arthur Hale Curtis, Wisconsin (NW)
- Jonathan E. Webb, Chicago (NW)

=== Guards ===
- Richard France, Michigan (NW)
- C. Rogers, Wisconsin (NW)

=== Centers ===
- Roy Chamberlain, Wisconsin (NW)

=== Quarterbacks ===
- Walter S. Kennedy, Chicago (NW) (CFHOF)

=== Halfbacks ===
- Ralph C. Hamill, Chicago (NW)
- John McLean, Michigan (NW)

=== Fullbacks ===
- Pat O'Dea, Wisconsin (NW)

== Key ==
NW = The Northwestern

CFHOF = College Football Hall of Fame

== See also ==
- 1899 College Football All-America Team
