= Albion Methodists football, 1910–1919 =

American college football seasons

The Albion Methodists football program, 1910–1919 (later known as the Albion Britons) represented Albion College in American football during the school's fourth decade of college football. The team competed as a member of the Michigan Intercollegiate Athletic Association (MIAA). Highlights of the decade include the following:

- Albion began the decade in 1910 with a 5–1 record, including a victory over Western State Normal (now known as Western Michigan University).
- The 1915 Albion Methodists football team won the MIAA championship with a 5–1–1 record (4–0–1 in MIAA games).
- The 1918 Albion Methodists football team compiled a 6–1 record (2–0 in MIAA games). The sole loss was to Michigan Agricultural (now known as Michigan State University).
- On October 18, 1919, Albion set the school's all-time single-game scoring record in defeating the Detroit Naval Training Station by a score of 178–0, including 68 points in the first quarter.

Walter S. Kennedy, who had been the quarterback and captain of the University of Chicago's football teams in 1898 and 1899, was Albion's head coach for most of the decade. Kennedy stepped down as Albion's coach in May 1913 to devote his efforts to his job as editor of the Albion Evening Recorder. Thomas Andrew Gill and Otto Carpell took over the post in 1913 and 1914, respectively. After the 1914 Albion team compiled a 1–6 record, Kennedy returned in 1915 as Albion's football coach. In 1918, Albion added Charles M. Guyselman as coach along with Kennedy. Albion credits Kennedy and Guyselman as co-coaches for the 1918 and 1919 seasons.

The team played its home games at Winter-Lau Field (1900–1913) and Alumni Field (1914–1971).

== 1910 ==
1910 Albion Methodists football
- Conference: Michigan Intercollegiate Athletic Association
- Record: 5–1 (4–1 MIAA)
- Head coach: Walter S. Kennedy (5th season)
- Captain: Lyle Miller
- Home stadium: Winter-Lau Field

The 1910 Albion Methodists football team represented Albion College as a member of the Michigan Intercollegiate Athletic Association (MIAA) during the 1910 college football season. In their fifth year under head coach Walter S. Kennedy, the Methodists compiled a 5–1 record (4–1 in conference games), finished in third place in the MIAA, and outscored opponents by a total of 105 to 32.

Lyle Miller was the team captain and played as a back. Two Albion players were selected to Chester Brewer's all-state eleven: Shattuck at tackle and Miller at halfback.

=== Schedule ===
Date	Opponent	Site	Result	Source
October 8	at Kalamazoo	Kalamazoo, MI	W 24–6	
October 15	Western State Normal*	Winter-Lau Field; Albion, MI	W 6–0	
October 22	at Adrian	Adrian, MI	W 11–0	
November 5	Hillsdale	Winter-Lau Field; Albion, MI	W 41–6	
November 12	at Olivet	Olivet, MI	L 3–15	
November 18	Kalamazoo	Winter-Lau Field; Albion, MI	W 20–5	
*Non-conference game

== 1911 ==
1911 Albion Methodists football
- Conference: Michigan Intercollegiate Athletic Association
- Record: 3–2 (2–2 MIAA)
- Head coach: Walter S. Kennedy (6th season)
- Home stadium: Winter-Lau Field

The 1911 Albion Methodists football team represented Albion College as a member of the Michigan Intercollegiate Athletic Association (MIAA) during the 1911 college football season. In their sixth year under head coach Walter S. Kennedy, the Methodists compiled a 3–2 record (2–2 in conference games) and outscored opponents by a total of 48 to 27.

=== Schedule ===
Date	Opponent	Site	Result	Source
October 20	at Western State Normal*	Woodward Avenue grounds; Kalamazoo, MI	W 12–5	
October 28	Alma	Alma, MI	W 9–0	
November 4	Adrian	Winter-Lau Field; Albion, MI	L 8–12	
November 11	Kalamazoo	Winter-Lau Field; Albion, MI	W 19–5	
November 18	Olivet	Winter-Lau Field; Albion, MI	L 0–5	
*Non-conference game

== 1912 ==
1912 Albion Methodists football
- Conference: Michigan Intercollegiate Athletic Association
- Record: 3–3 (2–2 MIAA)
- Head coach: Walter S. Kennedy (7th season)
- Home stadium: Winter-Lau Field

The 1912 Albion Methodists football team represented Albion College as a member of the Michigan Intercollegiate Athletic Association (MIAA) during the 1912 college football season. In their seventh year under head coach Walter S. Kennedy, the Methodists compiled a 3–3 record (2–2 in conference games).

=== Schedule ===
Date	Opponent	Site	Result	Source
October 12	at Kalamazoo	Kalamazoo, MI	W 26–0	
October 19	Alma	Winter-Lau Field; Albion, MI	L 6–19	
October 26	Western State Normal*	Winter-Lau Field; Albion, MI	L 3–7	
November 2	at Hillsdale	Martin Field; Hillsdale, MI	L 0–7	
November 9	Battle Creek YMCA*	Winter-Lau Field; Albion, MI	W 13–0	
November 16	Olivet	Olivet, MI	W 29–14	
*Non-conference game

== 1913 ==
1913 Albion Methodists football
- Conference: Michigan Intercollegiate Athletic Association
- Record: 3–3–1 (3–2–1 MIAA)
- Head coach: Thomas Andrew Gill (1st season)

1913 Michigan Intercollegiate Athletic Association football standings
	Conf.					Overall
Team	W		L		T	W		L		T
Olivet $	3	–	1	–	0	4	–	3	–	0
Alma	2	–	1	–	0	3	–	4	–	0
Hillsdale	2	–	1	–	1	2	–	3	–	1
Albion	3	–	2	–	1	3	–	3	–	1
Adrian	1	–	2	–	0	2	–	4	–	0
Kalamazoo	0	–	4	–	0	2	–	4	–	0
$ – Conference champion

The 1913 Albion Methodists football team represented Albion College as a member of the Michigan Intercollegiate Athletic Association (MIAA) during the 1913 college football season. In their first and only year under head coach Thomas Andrew Gill, the Methodists compiled a 3–3–1 record (3–2–1 in conference games), and finished in fourth place in the MIAA.

=== Schedule ===
Date	Time	Opponent	Site	Result	Source
October 4		Adrian	Adrian, MI	L 0–27	
October 10	2:30 p.m.	at Western State Normal	Woodward Avenue grounds; Kalamazoo, MI	L 3–20	
October 18		Alma	Winter-Lau Field; Albion, MI	L 0–33	
October 25		Kalamazoo	Winter-Lau Field; Albion, MI	W 23–7	
November 1		Hillsdale	Winter-Lau Field; Albion, MI	T 6–6	
November 8	2:30 p.m.	at Kalamazoo	Kalamazoo College campus; Kalamazoo, MI	W 13–0	
November 14		Olivet	Winter-Lau Field; Albion, MI	W 17–12	

== 1914 ==
1914 Albion Methodists football
- Conference: Michigan Intercollegiate Athletic Association
- Record: 1–6 (1–4 MIAA)
- Head coach: Otto Carpell (1st season)

1914 Michigan Intercollegiate Athletic Association football standings
	Conf.					Overall
Team	W		L		T	W		L		T
Olivet +	3	–	1	–	0	5	–	3	–	0
Hillsdale +	3	–	1	–	0	3	–	3	–	1
Kalamazoo	3	–	1	–	0	4	–	1	–	0
Albion	1	–	4	–	0	1	–	6	–	0
Adrian	0	–	1	–	0	3	–	3	–	0
Alma	0	–	2	–	0	2	–	5	–	1
+ – Conference co-champions

The 1914 Albion Methodists football team represented Albion College as a member of the Michigan Intercollegiate Athletic Association (MIAA) during the 1914 college football season. In their first year under head coach Otto Carpell, the Methodists compiled a 1–6 record (1–4 in conference games) and were outscored by a total of 155 to 30.

Albion halfback Lambert was selected as a first-team player on the 1914 All-MIAA football team. Riggs was selected as a second-team player at center.

=== Schedule ===
Date	Time	Opponent	Site	Result	Source
October 5		Battle Creek Normal School of Physical Education*	Albion, MI	L 6–12	
October 17		Western State Normal*	Albion, MI	L 0–43	
October 24	2:30 p.m.	at Kalamazoo	Kalamazoo College campus; Kalamazoo, MI	L 3–12	
October 31		Alma	Albion, MI	W 21–0	
November 7		at Hillsdale	Hillsale, MI	L 0–31	
November 13	3:00 p.m.	Kalamazoo	Winterlau Field; Albion, MI	L 0–33	
November 21		at Olivet	Olivet, MI	L 0–24	
*Non-conference game

== 1915 ==
1915 Albion Methodists football

MIAA champion
- Conference: Michigan Intercollegiate Athletic Association
- Record: 5–1–1 (4–0–1 MIAA)
- Head coach: Walter S. Kennedy (9th season)
- Home stadium: Alumni Field

1915 Michigan Intercollegiate Athletic Association football standings
	Conf.					Overall
Team	W		L		T	W		L		T
Albion $	4	–	0	–	1	5	–	1	–	1
Alma	1	–	0	–	2	1	–	3	–	2
Olivet	2	–	1	–	2	3	–	3	–	2
Kalamazoo	2	–	2	–	0	3	–	2	–	0
Hillsdale	2	–	3	–	1	3	–	3	–	1
Adrian	0	–	5	–	0	2	–	5	–	0
+ – Conference co-champions

The 1915 Albion Methodists football team represented Albion College as a member of the Michigan Intercollegiate Athletic Association (MIAA) during the 1915 college football season. In their ninth year under head coach Walter S. Kennedy, the Methodists compiled a 5–1–1 record (4–0–1 in conference games), won the MIAA championship, and outscored opponents by a total of 131 to 66.

=== Schedule ===
Date	Time	Opponent	Site	Result	Source
		Michigan Agricultural freshmen*		W 7–2	
October 16	2:30 p.m.	at Western State Normal*	Normal athletic field; Kalamazoo, MI	L 7–54	
October 23		Adrian	Alumni Field; Albion, MI	W 55–0	
November 6		Hillsdale	Alumni Field; Albion, MI	W 35–0	
October 30		at Alma	Alma, MI	T 7–7	
November 12	2:30 p.m.	at Kalamazoo	Western Normal athletic field; Kalamazoo, MI	W 14–0	
November 20		Olivet	Alumni Field; Albion, MI	W 6–3	
*Non-conference game

== 1916 ==
1916 Albion Methodists football
- Conference: Michigan Intercollegiate Athletic Association
- Record: 4–2–1 (3–1 MIAA)
- Head coach: Walter S. Kennedy (10th season)
- Home stadium: Alumni Field

The 1916 Albion Methodists football team represented Albion College as a member of the Michigan Intercollegiate Athletic Association (MIAA) during the 1916 college football season. In their tenth year under head coach Walter S. Kennedy, the Methodists compiled a 4–3–1 record (3–1 in conference games) and were outscored by a total of 103 to 62.

=== Schedule ===
Date	Opponent	Site	Result	Attendance	Source
October 6	at Western State Normal*	Normal field; Kalamazoo, MI	L 0–37		
October 14	Michigan Agricultural freshmen*	Alumni Field; Albion, MI	T 0–0		
October 20	Battle Creek Normal School of Physical Education*	Albion, MI	W 14–2		
October 28	Alma	Alumni Field; Albion, MI	W 20–10		
November 4	at Hillsdale	Hillsdale, MI	W 14–13		
November 11	Kalamazoo	Alumni Field; Albion, MI	L 13–41	4,000	
November 18	at Olivet	Olivet, MI	W 1–0 (forfeit)		
*Non-conference game

== 1917 ==
1917 Albion Methodists football
- Conference: Michigan Intercollegiate Athletic Association
- Record: 3–3 (2–2 MIAA)
- Head coach: Walter S. Kennedy (11th season)
- Home stadium: Alumni Field

1917 Michigan Intercollegiate Athletic Association football standings
	Conf.					Overall
Team	W		L		T	W		L		T
Alma $	4	–	0	–	0	6	–	1	–	0
Kalamazoo	4	–	1	–	0	5	–	5	–	0
Albion	2	–	2	–	0	3	–	3	–	0
Olivet	2	–	3	–	0	3	–	3	–	0
Adrian	0	–	2	–	0	0	–	3	–	0
Hillsdale	0	–	4	–	0	0	–	5	–	0
$ – Conference champion

The 1917 Albion Methodists football team represented Albion College as a member of the Michigan Intercollegiate Athletic Association (MIAA) during the 1917 college football season. In their 11th year under head coach Walter S. Kennedy, the Methodists compiled a 3–3 record (2–2 in conference games), finished in third place in the MIAA, and outscored opponents by a total of 103 to 77.

=== Schedule ===
Date	Time	Opponent	Site	Result	Source
October 3		at Western State Normal*	Normal field; Kalamazoo, MI	L 6–26	
October 19		Michigan Agricultural freshmen*	Alumni Field; Albion, MI	W 19–6	
October 27		at Alma	Alma, MI	L 3–7	
November 3		Hillsdale	Alumni Field; Albion, MI	W 55–3	
November 9	2:30 p.m.	at Kalamazoo	Kalamazoo, MI	L 10–28	
November 17		Olivet	Alumni Field; Albion, MI	W 10–7	
*Non-conference game

== 1918 ==
1918 Albion Methodists football
- Conference: Michigan Intercollegiate Athletic Association
- Record: 6–1 (2–0 MIAA)
- Head coach: Charles M. Guyselman (1st season) & Walter S. Kennedy (12th season)
- Home stadium: Alumni Field

The 1918 Albion Methodists football team represented Albion College as a member of the Michigan Intercollegiate Athletic Association (MIAA) during the 1918 college football season. In their 12th year under head coach Walter S. Kennedy, the Methodists compiled a 6–1 record (2–0 in conference games) and outscored opponents by a total of 182 to 67. Charles M. Guyselman shared coaching duties with Kennedy.

=== Schedule ===
Date	Time	Opponent	Site	Result	Source
October 5		at Michigan Agricultural*	College Field; East Lansing, MI	L 7–20	
October 12	2:45 p.m.	at Western State Normal*	Normal field; Kalamazoo, MI	W 14–12	
November 2		at Hillsdale	Hillsdale, MI	W 55–3	
November 9		Kalamazoo	Alumni Field; Albion, MI	W 34–10	
November 16		Detroit*	Detroit, MI	W 13–2	
November 23		vs. River Rouge Navy*	Navin Field; Detroit, MI	W 34–13 or L (forfeit)	
November 28		214th Field Signal Battalion*	Alumni Field; Albion, MI	W 25–6	
*Non-conference game; All times are in Central time

== 1919 ==
1919 Albion Methodists football
- Conference: Michigan Intercollegiate Athletic Association
- Record: 4–3 (2–1 MIAA)
- Head coach: Charles M. Guyselman (2nd season) & Walter S. Kennedy (13th season)
- Captain: John Osborne
- Home stadium: Alumni Field

The 1919 Albion Methodists football team represented Albion College as a member of the Michigan Intercollegiate Athletic Association (MIAA) during the 1919 college football season. In their 13th year under head coach Walter S. Kennedy, the Methodists compiled a 4–3 record (2–1 in conference games) and outscored opponents by a total of 306 to 54. Charles M. Guyselman shared coaching duties with Kennedy.

On October 18, the team set the Albion scoring record with 178 points against the Detroit Naval Air Station. Albion's tally of 68 points in the first quarter was believed to be an all-time national record.

Albion players received six of the eleven first-team spots on the 1919 All-MIAA football team. Albion's first-team honorees were: Harold Shields at quarterback; John Osborne at left halfback; Clark Dean at fullback; Bullen at right end; Stephen Garfield at left tackle; and Green at left guard. Four other Albion players were named to the second team: Frank Benish at left halfback; Joseph McAuliffe at right end; Walter Coffon at right tackle; and Wilbur Harper at center.

In September 1919, as the new academic year began, Albion reported record enrollment of 360, including more than 200 in the freshman class.

=== Schedule ===
Date	Opponent	Site	Result	Source
October 4	at Michigan Agricultural*	College Field; East Lansing, MI	L 13–14	
October 18	Detroit Naval Training Station*	Alumni Field; Albion, MI	W 178–0	
October 25	Alma	Alumni Field; Albion, MI	W 55–0	
November 1	Hillsdale	Alumni Field; Albion, MI	W 21–0	
November 8	at Kalamazoo	Kalamazoo, MI	L 2–13	
November 15	at Michigan State Normal*	Ypsilanti, MI	W 30–7	
November 21	Western State Normal*	Alumni Field; Albion, MI	L 7–20	
*Non-conference game
