= A. F. Holste =

American football player and coach

Biographical details
- Born: September 8, 1874; Palatine, Illinois, U.S.

Playing career

Football
- 1899: Chicago
- Position: Quarterback

Coaching career (HC unless noted)

Football
- 1900: Whitewater Normal
- 1901: Denison
- 1902: Morgan Park Academy (IL)
- 1903: Rose Polytechnic
- 1904: Fairmount
- 1908–1911: Hastings
- 1912: Bellevue
- 1913: Butte HS (MT)
- 1916: Lenox
- 1917: Fargo
- 1919–1921: Fergus County HS (MT)
- 1922–1925: Hastings

Baseball
- 1904: Fairmount

Head coaching record
- Overall: 48–38–8 (college football)

Accomplishments and honors

Championships
- 1 NIC (1923); Montana high school state (1913)

Friedrich August Albert Holste, known as August Fred Holste, (September 8, 1874 – ?) was an American football player and coach. He served as the head football coach at Rose Polytechnic Institute—now known as Rose-Hulman Institute of Technology—in 1903 and Fairmount College–now known as Wichita State University in 1904. Holste played college football at the University of Chicago, where he was a member of the undefeated 1899 Chicago Maroons football team. Holste coached at Morgan Park Academy in Chicago 1902.

Holste served as the head football coach at Whitewater Normal School—now known as the University of Wisconsin–Whitewater—in 1900 and Denison University in 1901. In 1913, he was the head football coach at Butte High School in Butte, Montana, winning the state championship in his lone season.

== Head coaching record ==
=== College football ===
Year	Team	Overall	Conference	Standing	Bowl/playoffs
Whitewater Normal (Independent) (1900)
1900	Whitewater Normal	6–4			
Whitewater Normal:		6–4			
Denison (Independent) (1901)
1901	Denison	6–5			
Denison:		6–5			
Rose Polytechnic (Independent) (1903)
1903	Rose Polytechnic	4–3			
Rose Polytechnic:		4–3			
Fairmount Wheatshockers (Independent) (1904)
1904	Fairmount	4–5			
Fairmount:		4–5			
Hastings (Independent) (1908–1911)
1908	Hastings	5–2			
1909	Hastings	2–2–2			
1910	Hastings	3–0–2			
1911	Hastings	1–2			
Lenox (Independent) (1916)
1916	Lenox	0–3			
Lenox:		0–3			
Fargo Hilltoppers (Independent) (1917)
1917	Fargo	0–4			
Fargo:		0–4			
Hastings Broncos (Nebraska Intercollegiate Conference / Nebraska College Athletic Conference) (1922–1925)
1922	Hastings	4–2–1	4–2–1	T–6th	
1923	Hastings	7–0	7–0	1st	
1924	Hastings	5–1–2	4–0–1	2nd	
1925	Hastings	1–5–1	1–4–1	9th	
Hastings:		28–14–8	16–6–3		
Total:		48–38–8			
National championship Conference title Conference division title or championship game berth
