= Leo J. Keena =

American football player and diplomat (1878–1967)

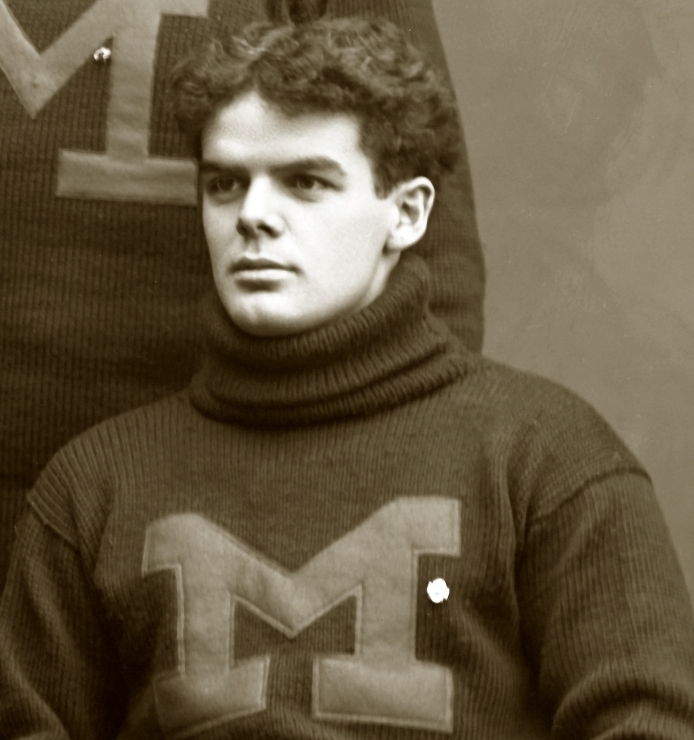
- Keena cropped from 1897 University of Michigan team photograph

2nd United States Minister to South Africa
- In office October 22, 1937 – August 13, 1942
- President: Franklin D. Roosevelt
- Preceded by: Ralph J. Totten
- Succeeded by: Lincoln MacVeagh

United States Minister to Honduras
- In office July 19, 1935 – May 1, 1937
- President: Franklin D. Roosevelt
- Preceded by: Julius Gareché Lay
- Succeeded by: John Draper Erwin

Personal details
- Born: Leo Japathet Keena; April 12, 1878 Detroit, Michigan, U.S.
- Died: December 13, 1967 (aged 89) Knysna, Cape Province, South Africa
- Education: University of Michigan
- Known for: Diplomat

Military service
- Allegiance: United States
- Branch/service: United States Navy
- Years of service: 1898
- Battles/wars: Spanish–American War

Leo John Keena (Note: Although Keena's middle name is listed as "Japathet" in the University of Michigan yearbook, the Michiganensian, for 1899, later sources, including the State Department, refer to him by the middle name "John.") (April 12, 1878 – December 13, 1967) was an American college football player and diplomat.

== Early years ==
Keena was born in Detroit, Michigan in 1878, the son of James T. Keena and Henrietta (Boyle) Keena. His father was a lawyer who later became the president of the Peoples State Bank of Detroit.

== University of Michigan ==
Keena played college football as a fullback and kicker for the University of Michigan from 1897 to 1899. He served in the United States Navy as a seaman on the auxiliary cruiser USS Yosemite during the Spanish–American War.

== Diplomatic career ==
After receiving his degree, Keena became a diplomat for the United States in 1909. He was married in August 1906 to Eleanor Clarke. Keena's early diplomatic posts include service as U.S. Consul in Chihuahua, Mexico (1909–10), U.S. Counsel to Florence, Italy (1910–14), U.S. Consul General in Buenos Aires, Argentina (1914–15), U.S. Consul General in Valparaíso, Chile (1915–19), U.S. Consul General in Zürich, Switzerland (1919–20), U.S. Consul General in Warsaw, Poland (1920–22), U.S. Consul in Liverpool, England (1924–26), U.S. Counsul General in Havana, Cuba (1927–29), and U.S. Counsul General in Paris (1929–32). He was appointed by U.S. President Franklin D. Roosevelt and served as the United States Ambassador to Honduras from February 1935 to May 1937 and as United States Ambassador to South Africa from July 1937 to August 1942.

== Later life and death ==
After his assignment to South Africa, Keena retired from the Foreign Service in 1943. He died in Knysna in December 1967.

== Notes ==
Diplomatic posts
Preceded by Julius Gareché Lay	United States Minister to Honduras; 1935-1937	Succeeded by John Draper Erwin
Preceded by Ralph J. Totten	United States Minister to South Africa; 1937–1943	Succeeded by Lincoln MacVeagh
