= 1899 Wisconsin Badgers football team =

American college football season

1899 Wisconsin Badgers football
- Conference: Western Conference
- Record: 9–2 (4–1 Western)
- Head coach: Philip King (4th season)
- Captain: Pat O'Dea
- Home stadium: Randall Field

1899 Western Conference football standings
	Conf.					Overall
Team	W		L		T	W		L		T
Chicago $	4	–	0	–	0	16	–	0	–	2
Wisconsin	4	–	1	–	0	9	–	2	–	0
Northwestern	2	–	2	–	0	7	–	6	–	0
Michigan	1	–	1	–	0	8	–	2	–	0
Purdue	1	–	2	–	0	4	–	4	–	1
Minnesota	0	–	3	–	0	6	–	3	–	2
Illinois	0	–	3	–	0	3	–	5	–	1
$ – Conference champion

The 1899 Wisconsin Badgers football team represented the University of Wisconsin in the 1899 college football season. Led by fourth-year head coach Philip King, the Badgers compiled an overall record of 9–2 with a mark of 4–1 in conference play, placing second in the Western Conference. The team's captain was Pat O'Dea.

== Schedule ==
Date	Opponent	Site	Result	Attendance	Source
September 30	Lake Forest*	Randall Field; Madison, WI	W 45–0		
October 7	vs. Beloit*	Athletic Park; Milwaukee, WI	W 36–0	5,000	
October 14	Northwestern*	Randall Field; Madison, WI	W 38–0		
October 21	at Yale*	Yale Field; New Haven, CT	L 0–6		
October 28	Rush Medical	Randall Field; Madison, WI	W 10–0		
November 4	vs. Wisconsin Alumni*	Randall Field; Madison, WI	W 17–5		
November 11	vs. Illinois	Athletic Park; Milwaukee, WI	W 23–0	5,000	
November 18	at Minnesota	Northrop Field; Minneapolis, MN (rivalry)	W 19–0		
November 25	Lawrence*	Randall Field; Madison, WI	W 58–0		
November 30	vs. Michigan	West Side Park; Chicago, IL	W 17–5	18,000	
December 9	Chicago	Randall Field; Madison, WI	L 0–17	9,000	
*Non-conference game
