= Richard France =

American football player (1879–1953)

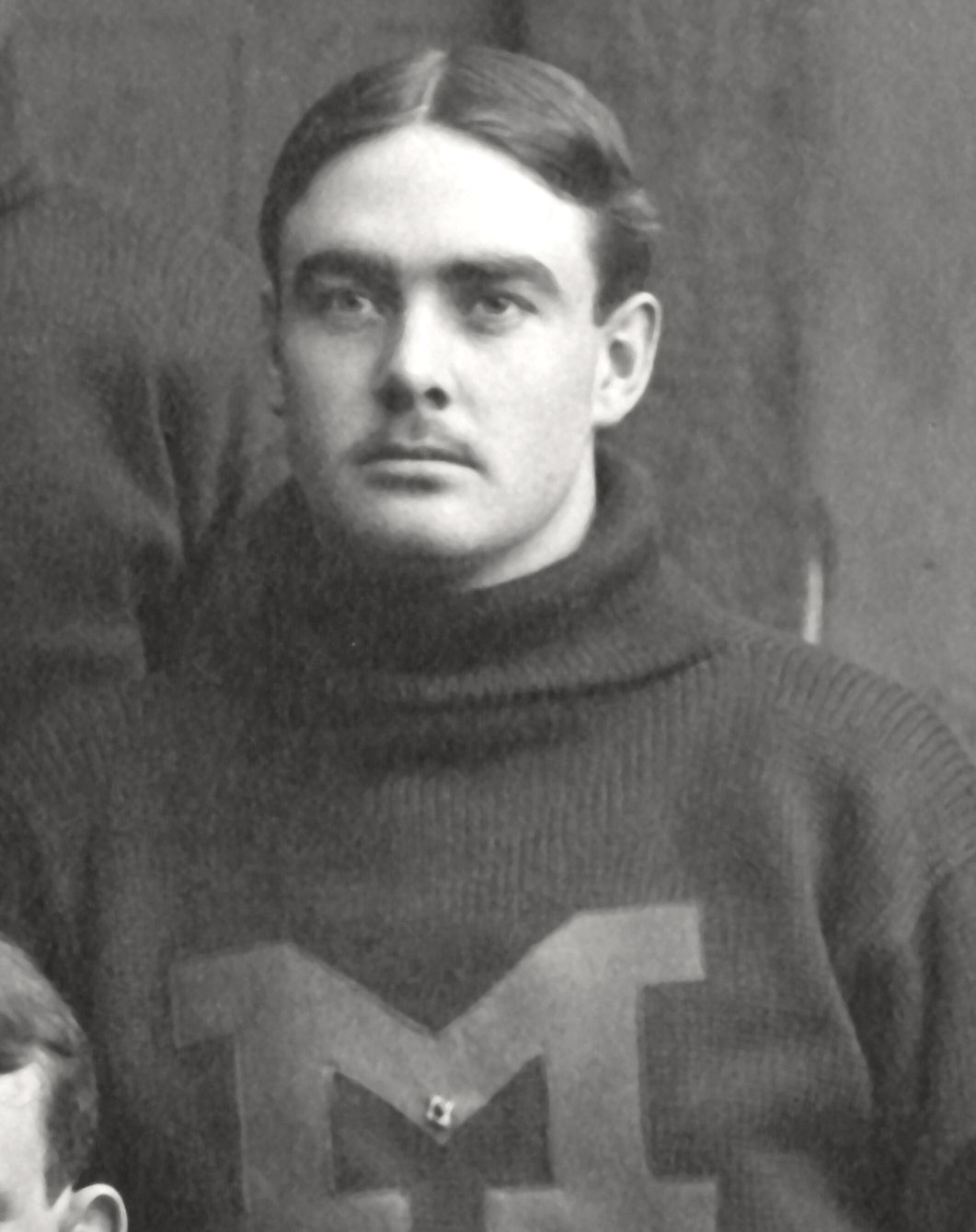
- Photograph of Richard France cropped from 1899 Michigan team photograph

Profile
- Position: Guard

Personal information
- Born: April 6, 1879; Decatur, Indiana, U.S.
- Died: April 19, 1953 (aged 74); Louisville, Ohio, U.S.

Career information
- College: Michigan (1899)

Awards and highlights
- All-American, 1899

Richard Roy France (April 6, 1879 – April 19, 1953) was an American football guard who played for the University of Michigan in 1898 and 1899. The 1898 team won the Western Conference. He was named an All-American in 1899.

== Biography ==
France was born in Decatur, Indiana, in 1879. He was the son of John T. France, a lawyer, and Belle France.

France enrolled at the University of Michigan where he played for the Michigan Wolverines football team. He was selected as a first-team All-American in 1899 by the Philadelphia Inquirer, and was a consensus All-Western player that year. France played on the 1898 Michigan Wolverines football team that won the school's first Western Conference championship, outscoring opponents 205–26 with a perfect 10–0 record. He also played on the 1899 Michigan team that outscored opponents 176–43 and compiled an 8–2 record.

France gained press coverage for his role in the 1899 game against the Wisconsin Badgers that decided the Western Conference championship. Wisconsin was led that year by Pat O'Dea, considered the greatest kicker in the history of the game to that time. The game was played in Chicago on Thanksgiving Day in front of a crowd of 18,000, the largest crowd to that date to watch a football game west of Philadelphia. Wisconsin took an 11–0 lead in the game, largely through the play of O'Dea. There were reports that Michigan's strategy was to put O'Dea out of the game, and he was subjected to a number of rough hits by France and William Cunningham. On one play, France "came into him like a battering ram after he had punted the ball." O'Dea warned France that if he did it again "there would be trouble." After another punt, France came for O'Dea again, and O'Dea slugged him in the face. A Wisconsin newspaper account described the incident as follows:

"Meantime O'Dea had been laying out France, hitting him with such force that the big guard was stretched out and but for the time gained through the wrangle at the end of the goal line and the speedy ending of the half, would hardly have been able to continue playing. O'Dea claimed that the knockout blow was accidental."

The game's referee saw the blow, and O'Dea was ejected from the game. Even without O'Dea, Wisconsin hung on in the second half to win the game, 17–5.

In a draft registration card completed in 1918, France listed his residence as Alliance, Ohio, and his employer as the Morgan Engineering Co. In a later draft registration card completed at the time of World War II, France list his residence as Canton, Ohio, and his occupation as the Sheriff of Stark County, Ohio. France died in 1953 at age 74 in Louisville, Ohio. He was buried in Alliance, Ohio.
