= Frederick Feil =

American football player and coach

Playing career
- 1899–1900: Chicago
- Position: Left tackle

Coaching career (HC unless noted)
- 1901: Wabash

Head coaching record
- Overall: 4–7

Frederick Feil was an American college football player and coach. He was the 14th head football coach at Wabash College in Crawfordsville, Indiana serving for one season, in 1901, and compiling a record of 4–7. Feil played college football at the University of Chicago.

== Head coaching record ==
| Year | Team | Overall | Conference | Standing | Bowl/playoffs |
|---|---|---|---|---|---|
Wabash (Independent) (1901)
| 1901 | Wabash | 4–7 | | | |
| Wabash: | | 4–7 | | | |
| Total: | | 4–7 | | | |
