= Jack Harrison (American football) =

American football player and coach, politician, businessman (1875–1952)

Biographical details
- Born: January 30, 1875; Minneapolis, Minnesota, U.S.
- Died: September 19, 1952 (aged 77); Arcola, Minnesota, U.S.
- Education: Minnesota Law (1899, LLB)

Playing career

Football
- 1894–1897: Minnesota

Track and field
- 1897–1898: Minnesota
- Position: End (football)

Coaching career (HC unless noted)

Football
- 1899: Minnesota
- 1900–1901: North Dakota Agricultural

Head coaching record
- Overall: 21–4–3

John Martin "Hinkey" Harrison (January 30, 1875 – September 19, 1952) was an American college football coach and player, politician, and businessman. He served as the head football coach at the University of Minnesota in 1899 and North Dakota Agricultural College—now known as North Dakota State University–from 1900 to 1901, compiling a career coaching record of 21–4–3.

Harrison graduated from Central High School in Minneapolis before attending the University of Minnesota, where was captain of the 1896 Minnesota Golden Gophers football team and the 1897 Minnesota Golden Gophers football team. He also competed in track and field, captaining the Minnesota Golden Gophers track and field team in 1897 and 1898. Harrison practiced law, and then went into the insurance business.

Harrison served two terms in the Minnesota House of Representatives, having been elected from the 34th district in 1914 and 1916. He joined Marsh McLennan in 1923, after the firm purchased the Contain-Harrison-Zonne insurance agency, and headed the company's office in Minneapolis. Harrison died on September 19, 1952, at his home in Arcola, Minnesota, after suffering a heart attack.

== Head coaching record ==
Year	Team	Overall	Conference	Standing	Bowl/playoffs
Minnesota Golden Gophers (Western Conference) (1899)
1899	Minnesota	6–3–2	0–3	T–6th	
Minnesota:		6–3–2	0–3		
North Dakota Agricultural Aggies (Independent) (1900–1901)
1900	North Dakota Agricultural	8–1–1			
1901	North Dakota Agricultural	7–0			
North Dakota Agricultural:		15–1–1			
Total:		21–4–3			
