= 1899 All-America college football team =

List of the best college football players of 1899

The 1899 All-America college football team is composed of college football players who were selected as All-Americans by various organizations and writers that chose All-America college football teams for the 1899 college football season. The organizations that chose the teams included Walter Camp for Collier's Weekly and Caspar Whitney for Outing Magazine.

Of the 13 players recognized as consensus All-Americans for the 1899 season, 12 played for the four Ivy League teams that were known as the "Big Four" of college football—Harvard, Princeton, Yale and Penn. The sole exception was Isaac Seneca, a Native American who played at the fullback position for the Carlisle Indian Industrial School in Carlisle, Pennsylvania. Seneca won acclaim after leading Carlisle to a 42–0 victory over Columbia in a Thanksgiving Day game in Manhattan and a 2–0 victory over the University of California on Christmas Day in San Francisco.

The following players were selected as first-team All-Americans by at least four of the seven selectors: end Dave Campbell of Harvard (6), guard Truxtun Hare of Penn (6), end Art Poe of Princeton (5), tackle Art Hillebrand of Princeton (5), guard Gordon Brown of Yale (5), center Pete Overfield of Penn (4), and quarterback Charles Dudley Daly of Harvard (4).

== All-American selections for 1899 ==
=== Ends ===
- **Art Poe**, Princeton (College Football Hall of Fame) (WC-1; OUT-1; NYT-1; NYS-1; CEP-1)
- **Dave Campbell**, Harvard (WC-1; OUT-1; PI-1; NYT-1; NYS-1; CEP-1)
- Neil Snow, Michigan (College Football Hall of Fame) (WC-3; PI-1)
- John Hallowell, Harvard (WC-2; NYT-2; OUT-2; CEP-2)
- Walter Coombs, Penn (WC-2; NYT-2)
- Lew Palmer, Princeton (OUT-2)
- A. L. Slocum, Brown (CEP-2)
- Ralph C. Hamill, Chicago (WC-3)

=== Tackles ===
- **Art Hillebrand**, Princeton (College Football Hall of Fame) (WC-1; OUT-1; NYT-1; NYS-1; CEP-1)
- **George S. Stillman**, Yale (WC-1; NYT-2; CEP-1)
- Richard France, Michigan (PI-1)
- Blondy Wallace, Penn (WC-2; NYT-1; CEP-2)
- Martin Wheelock, Carlisle (WC-2; OUT-2; NYS-1)
- Edward R. Alexander, Cornell (WC-3; NYT-2; CEP-2)
- Malcolm Donald, Harvard (OUT-1)
- Williamson Pell, Princeton (WC-3; OUT-2)

=== Guards ===
- **Gordon Brown**, Yale (College Football Hall of Fame) (WC-1; CW-2; NYT-1; NYS-1; PI-1 [t]; CEP-1)
- **Truxtun Hare**, Penn (WC-1; OUT-1; PI-1; NYT-1; NYS-1; CEP-1)
- Big Bill Edwards, Princeton (WC-2; OUT-1; NYT-2; CEP-2)
- William Armistead Moale Burden, Harvard (WC-3; OUT-2; NYT-2)
- Arthur H. Whittemore, Brown (CEP-2)
- Harry E. Trout, Lafayette (WC-3)

=== Centers ===
- **Pete Overfield**, Penn (WC-1; OUT-1; PI-1; CEP-1)
- Walter C. Booth, Princeton (NYT-1)
- Jack Wright, Columbia (WC-2 [as G], NYS-1)
- William Cunningham, Michigan (WC-2)
- Francis Lowell Burnett, Harvard (WC-3; OUT-2; NYT-2)

=== Quarterbacks ===
- **Charles Dudley Daly**, Harvard (WC-1; NYT-1; NYS-1; CEP-1)
- Walter S. Kennedy, Chicago (WC-2; PI-1)
- George H. Young, Cornell (OUT-2; NYT-2)
- Frank Hudson, Carlisle (WC-3; OUT-1)

=== Halfbacks ===
- **Isaac Seneca**, Carlisle (WC-1; NYS-1)
- **Josiah McCracken**, Penn (WC-1; PI-1 [t])
- **Albert Sharpe**, Yale (NYT-1; OUT-1)
- **Howard Reiter**, Princeton (OUT-1; PI-1; NYT-2; CEP-1)
- John McLean, Michigan (WC-3, PI-1)
- George A. Sawin, Harvard (NYT-1; NYS-1)
- Willis Richardson, Brown (WC-2; NYT-2; CEP-1)
- Frank L. Slaker, Chicago (WC-2)
- Bill Morley, Columbia (OUT-2)
- George B. Walbridge, Cornell (OUT-2)
- William Fincke, Yale (CEP-2)
- Frederick E. Jennings, Dartmouth (CEP-2)
- Louis L. Draper, Williams (CEP-2)
- Harold Weekes, Columbia (WC-3)

=== Fullbacks ===
- **Malcolm McBride**, Yale (WC-1; OUT-1; NYT-1; CEP-2)
- H. Wheeler, Princeton (WC-2; PI-1; NYT-2)
- Edward G. Bray, Lafayette (OUT-2; CEP-1)
- Pat O'Dea, Wisconsin (WC-3)

=== Key ===
- WC = Collier's Weekly as selected by Walter Camp
- CW = Caspar Whitney
- OUT = Outing Magazine
- PI = Philadelphia Inquirer
- NYT = New York Tribune
- NYS = New York Sun
- CEP = Charles E. Patterson in Leslie's Weekly
- **Bold** = Consensus All-American

== See also ==
- 1899 All-Southern college football team
- 1899 All-Western college football team
