= 1899 Illinois Fighting Illini football team =

American college football season

1899 Illinois Fighting Illini football
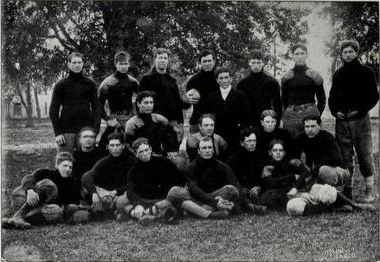
- Conference: Western Conference
- Record: 3–5–1 (0–3 Western)
- Head coach: George Huff (5th season)
- Captain: E. C. McLane
- Home stadium: Illinois Field

1899 Western Conference football standings
	Conf.					Overall
Team	W		L		T	W		L		T
Chicago $	4	–	0	–	0	16	–	0	–	2
Wisconsin	4	–	1	–	0	9	–	2	–	0
Northwestern	2	–	2	–	0	7	–	6	–	0
Michigan	1	–	1	–	0	8	–	2	–	0
Purdue	1	–	2	–	0	4	–	4	–	1
Minnesota	0	–	3	–	0	6	–	3	–	2
Illinois	0	–	3	–	0	3	–	5	–	1
$ – Conference champion

The 1899 Illinois Fighting Illini football team was an American football team that represented the University of Illinois during the 1899 college football season. In their fifth season under head coach George Huff, the Illini compiled a 3–5–1 record and finished in a tie for last place in the Western Conference. Center E. C. McLane was the team captain.

== Schedule ==
Date	Opponent	Site	Result	Attendance	Source
September 30	Illinois Wesleyan*	Illinois Field; Champaign, IL	W 6–0		
October 7	at Knox*	Willard Field; Galesburg, IL	W 5–0		
October 14	Indiana	Illinois Field; Champaign, IL (rivalry)	L 0–5		
October 28	Michigan	Illinois Field; Champaign, IL (rivalry)	L 0–5		
November 6	vs. Illinois alumni*	Illinois Field; Champaign, IL	T 0–0		
November 11	vs. Wisconsin	Athletic Park; Milwaukee, WI	L 0–23	5,000	
November 22	at Purdue	Stuart Field; West Lafayette, IN (rivalry)	L 0–5	1,200	
November 25	at Saint Louis*	Sportsman's Park; St. Louis, MO	W 29–0		
November 30	vs. Iowa*	Rock Island baseball park; Rock Island, IL	L 0–58	4,000–10,000	
*Non-conference game

== Roster ==
1899 Illinois Fighting Illini football team roster
Players
Coaches
Offense

Pos.	#	Name	Class
QB, TE		Bertram W. Adsit
OL		Norman P. Briley
OL		Clark M. Clayton
TE		Frank D. Francis
HB, TE		Arthur R. Hall
FB		Arthur Johnston
OT		Justa M. Lindgren
G, OT		Fred Lowenthal
FB		Carl L. Lundgren
C		E.C. McLane (C)
FB, TE		Garland Stahl
QB		Albert M. Wadsworth

Defense

Pos.	#	Name	Class

Special teams

Pos.	#	Name	Class
HB, TE		F.M. Cayou
QB		C.C. Chamberlain
G, TE		William O. Doud
QB		Lee Jutton
HB, FB		H.C. Lewis
HB		Harry R. Logan
HB, TE		Robert W. Martin
G		R.C. McCormick
G, OT		E.R. Pollard

Head coach

- George Huff

Coordinators/assistant coaches

Legend

- (C) Team captain
- (S) Suspended
- (I) Ineligible
- Injured
- Redshirt

Roster
Last update: November 16, 2016
