= 1899 Purdue Boilermakers football team =

American college football season

1899 Purdue Boilermakers football
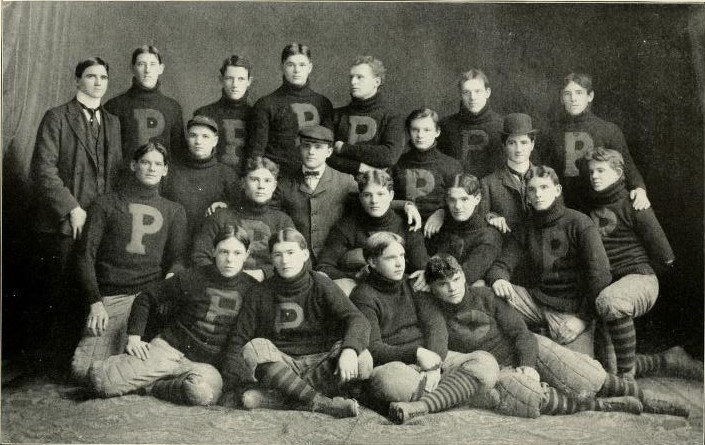
- Conference: Western Conference
- Record: 4–4–1 (1–2 Western)
- Head coach: Alpha Jamison (2nd season)
- Captain: Edward C. Robertson
- Home stadium: Stuart Field

1899 Western Conference football standings
	Conf.					Overall
Team	W		L		T	W		L		T
Chicago $	4	–	0	–	0	16	–	0	–	2
Wisconsin	4	–	1	–	0	9	–	2	–	0
Northwestern	2	–	2	–	0	7	–	6	–	0
Michigan	1	–	1	–	0	8	–	2	–	0
Purdue	1	–	2	–	0	4	–	4	–	1
Minnesota	0	–	3	–	0	6	–	3	–	2
Illinois	0	–	3	–	0	3	–	5	–	1
$ – Conference champion

The 1899 Purdue Boilermakers football team was an American football team that represented Purdue University during the 1899 college football season. The Boilermakers compiled a 4–4–1 record and were outscored by their opponents by a total of 122 to 100 in their second season under head coach Alpha Jamison. Edward C. Robertson was the team captain.

== Schedule ==
Date	Opponent	Site	Result	Attendance	Source
September 30	Purdue alumni*	Stuart Field; West Lafayette, IN	W 10–5		
October 7	Earlham*	Stuart Field; West Lafayette, IN	W 30–5		
October 14	at Oberlin*	Oberlin, OH	L 0–12		
October 28	DePauw*	Stuart Field; West Lafayette, IN	W 40–0		
November 4	at Chicago	Marshall Field; Chicago, IL (rivalry)	L 0–44		
November 18	Notre Dame*	Stuart Field; West Lafayette, IN (rivalry)	T 10–10		
November 22	Illinois	Stuart Field; West Lafayette, IN (rivalry)	W 5–0	1,200	
November 25	at Northwestern	Sheppard Field; Evanston, IL	L 0–29		
November 30	Indiana*	Stuart Field; West Lafayette, IN (rivalry)	L 5–17		
*Non-conference game

== Roster ==
- A. W. Anderson, T
- A. H. Barnes, E
- F. V. Berkey, FB
- William Berkshire, C
- H. L. Byers, HB
- J. M. Davidson, C
- A. Dushane, G
- Rodney Hitt, E
- John Jones, QB
- R. B. MacKenzie, E
- F. J. McCoy, HB
- John Miller, G
- Charlie Quinn
- C. T. Rich, T
- Edward C. Robertson, QB-HB
- Alex Smith, T
- M. H. Spades, E
- G. B. Tracey, HB
- F. L. Waterman, QB
