= 1899 Northwestern Purple football team =

American college football season

1899 Northwestern Purple football
- Conference: Western Conference
- Record: 7–6 (2–2 Western)
- Head coach: Charles M. Hollister (1st season)
- Captain: Harry Little
- Home stadium: Sheppard Field

1899 Western Conference football standings
	Conf.					Overall
Team	W		L		T	W		L		T
Chicago $	4	–	0	–	0	16	–	0	–	2
Wisconsin	4	–	1	–	0	9	–	2	–	0
Northwestern	2	–	2	–	0	7	–	6	–	0
Michigan	1	–	1	–	0	8	–	2	–	0
Purdue	1	–	2	–	0	4	–	4	–	1
Minnesota	0	–	3	–	0	6	–	3	–	2
Illinois	0	–	3	–	0	3	–	5	–	1
$ – Conference champion

The 1899 Northwestern Purple team represented Northwestern University during the 1899 college football season. In their first year under head coach Charles M. Hollister, the Purple compiled a 7–6 record (2–2 against Western Conference opponents) and finished in third place in the Western Conference.

== Schedule ==
Date	Opponent	Site	Result	Attendance	Source
September 23	Englewood High School*	Sheppard Field; Evanston, IL	W 29–0		
September 27	West Division High School*	Sheppard Field; Evanston, IL	W 24–0		
September 30	Northwestern alumni*	Sheppard Field; Evanston, IL	L 0–18		
October 7	Rush Medical*	Sheppard Field; Evanston, IL	L 0–6		
October 14	at Wisconsin	Randall Field; Madison, WI	L 0–38		
October 21	at Beloit*	Beloit, WI	L 0–11	1,000	
October 26	Lake Forest*	Sheppard Field; Evanston, IL	W 16–0		
October 28	at Notre Dame*	Brownson Hall field; South Bend, IN (rivalry)	L 0–12		
November 4	at Minnesota	Northrop Field; Minneapolis, MN	W 11–5	3,000	
November 11	at Chicago	Marshall Field; Chicago, IL	L 0–76	3,000	
November 18	Indiana*	Sheppard Field; Evanston, IL	W 11–6	1,000	
November 25	Purdue	Sheppard Field; Evanston, IL	W 29–0		
*Non-conference game
