= 1899 Minnesota Golden Gophers football team =

American college football season

1899 Minnesota Golden Gophers football
- Conference: Western Conference
- Record: 6–3–2 (0–3 Western)
- Head coach: Jack Harrison & William C. Leary (1st season)
- Captain: Buzz Schandrett
- Home stadium: Northrop Field

1899 Western Conference football standings
	Conf.					Overall
Team	W		L		T	W		L		T
Chicago $	4	–	0	–	0	16	–	0	–	2
Wisconsin	4	–	1	–	0	9	–	2	–	0
Northwestern	2	–	2	–	0	7	–	6	–	0
Michigan	1	–	1	–	0	8	–	2	–	0
Purdue	1	–	2	–	0	4	–	4	–	1
Minnesota	0	–	3	–	0	6	–	3	–	2
Illinois	0	–	3	–	0	3	–	5	–	1
$ – Conference champion

The 1899 Minnesota Golden Gophers football team represented the University of Minnesota in the 1899 college football season. The Golden Gophers compiled a 6–3–2 record (0–3 against Western Conference opponents) and outscored all opponents by a combined total of 149 to 79.

Jack Harrison and William C. Leary and were head coaches for the 1899 season. They coached the team as a part of a new alumni coaching program. Although most around the program considered the experiment a success, the program was discontinued with the hiring of the university's first full-time salaried coach, Henry L. Williams. The 1899 season was the only season under head coaches Leary and Harrison. This season's 0–3 record left Minnesota in a last place tie with Illinois.

Northrop Field was first used as the home field of the University of Minnesota this year with most of the credit for securing it going to former coach Frederick S. Jones and former Governor John S. Pillsbury.

== Schedule ==
Date	Opponent	Site	Result	Attendance	Source
September 26	Minneapolis Central High*	Northrop Field; Minneapolis, MN	W 20–0		
October 3	Macalester*	Northrop Field; Minneapolis, MN	W 29–0		
October 7	Shattuck*	Northrop Field; Minneapolis, MN	W 40–0		
October 14	Carleton*	Northrop Field; Minneapolis, MN	W 35–5		
October 21	Iowa State*	Northrop Field; Minneapolis, MN	W 6–0		
October 28	Grinnell*	Northrop Field; Minneapolis, MN	T 5–5		
November 4	Northwestern	Northrop Field; Minneapolis, MN	L 5–11	3,000	
November 8	Alumni*	Northrop Field; Minneapolis, MN	W 6–5		
November 11	Beloit*	Northrop Field; Minneapolis, MN	T 5–5		
November 18	Wisconsin	Northrop Field; Minneapolis, MN (rivalry)	L 0–19		
November 25	at Chicago	Marshall Field; Chicago, IL	L 0–29	8,000	
*Non-conference game

== Roster ==
- Ends, Dobie (left end), Henry "Buzz" Scandrett (captain and right end) and Fosseen (right end)
- Tackles, Otte, Gray (left tackle), Hoyt, Mueller (right tackle)
- Guards, Aune (left guard), Tifft, Flynn (right guard)
- Center, Page
- Quarterback, Cole, Rogers
- Halfbacks, Evans, Bernhagen (left half), Kienholtz, Freeman (right half)
- Fullback, Glover.
