= Ralph C. Hamill =

American football player and coach (1877–1961)

Ralph Hamill
Biographical details
- Born: February 13, 1877; Lombard, Illinois, U.S.
- Died: July 5, 1961 (aged 84); Winnetka, Illinois, U.S.

Playing career
- 1896–1899: Chicago

Coaching career (HC unless noted)
- 1900: Centre

Head coaching record
- Overall: 4–1–1

Accomplishments and honors

Awards
- Third-team All-American (1899)

Ralph C. Hamill (February 13, 1877 – July 5, 1961) was an American college football player and coach. He served as the head coach at Centre College in Danville, Kentucky in 1900. Hamill later worked as a neurologist and psychiatrist. He is credited with the first description of superficial siderosis, published by him in 1908. He died on July 5, 1961, at his home in Winnetka, Illinois.

== Head coaching record ==
Year	Team	Overall	Conference	Standing	Bowl/playoffs
Centre (Independent) (1900)
1900	Centre	4–1–1			
Centre:		4–1–1			
Total:		4–1–1			
