= Pete Overfield =

American football player, judge (1874–1959)

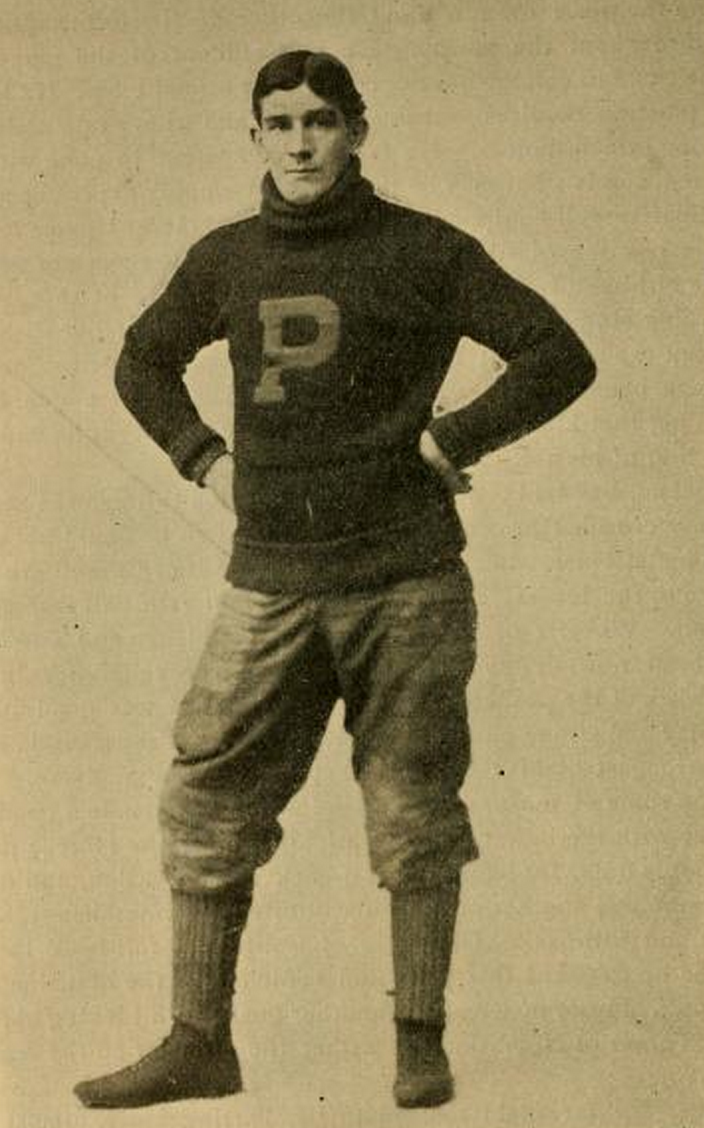
- Overfield during his football days at Penn

Profile
- Position: Center

Personal information
- Born: April 12, 1874; Pennsylvania, U.S.
- Died: July 1, 1959 (aged 85); San Diego, California, U.S.

Career information
- College: Penn

Career history
- 1900–1901: Homestead L. & A. C.
- 1903: Sigma Chi All-Star team

Awards and highlights
- 2× Consensus All-American (1898, 1899); Third-team All-American (1897); 2× W. Pennsylvania Circuit champion (1900, 1901); All-Time All-Eastern football team (1923)

Peter Delome Overfield (April 12, 1874 – July 1, 1959) was an All-American and professional football player, federal judge and rancher. Overfield played center for the University of Pennsylvania and was a first-team All-American in 1898 and 1899. He served as a federal district judge in Alaska from 1909 to 1917. In 1917, he moved to Casa Grande, Arizona, where he lived for the remainder of his life, owning a large ranching operation.

== Football player ==
Overfield played center for the Penn Quakers from 1897 to 1899 and was selected as a first-team All-American in both 1898 and 1899. Overfield was known as a fierce competitor. After Harvard defeated Penn 16–0 in 1899, Overfield tried to prevent Harvard from securing the ball as a trophy in accordance with a custom. A scuffle spread into the stands, and Penn's coach ultimately secured the ball from Overfield and made Overfield apologize to the Harvard players.

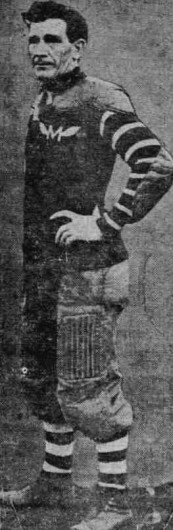
Overfield as a member of the Multnomah Athletic Club football team in Portland, Oregon in 1913.

After graduating from Penn, Overfield remained active in football. He was a football coach for a time at Multnomah College and also remained active as a professional football player. Overfield played a total of nine years of college and professional football without ever suffering an injury. He played on the famed 1900 and 1901 Homestead Library & Athletic Club football teams in Pittsburgh. The 1901 Homestead team consisted of former college football All-Americans, including Overfield, Bemus Pierce (Carlisle) and Arthur Poe (Princeton). The team beat Lafayette 66–0 in two ten-minute halves. On November 23, 1901, the Homestead Library team featuring Overfield defeated the Blondy Wallace's Philadelphia professionals for the professional football championship of the United States. The game was played at the Philadelphia park, and Homestead won by a score of 18 to 0. The New York Times reported on the game as follows:

Against the well-trained, concerted team work of Homestead they were like so many pigmies. Their line could not hold the fast onslaught of the Western contingent, and after the first ten minutes of play a lack of good physical condition began to assert itself. … The 5,000 spectators present shivered through thirty minute halves and at no time during the game was a real opportunity offered to get enthusiastic over the work of Wallace's [Philadelphia's captain] team. It was an eleven made up of stars against well-trained team work, and the latter triumphed.

In 1903, Overfield played in a Thanksgiving Day game in Denver on a team composed of old stars of the Sigma Chi fraternity. The 1903 Sigma Chi All-Star team was made up of former All-Americans, including Overfield, Thorpe, Hernstein, Stahl, Starbuck, Van Valken, and Van Hoevenberg.

In 1923, Princeton head coach William Roper named Overfield as the center on his All-Time All-Eastern football team. Roper wrote, "Pete Overfield would be ideally equipped to act as pivot on any team today just as he was when he played for Pennsylvania twenty-odd years ago. If my recollection is correct Overfield was down the field on kicks with the ends. He was a sure passer and a wonderful defensive man. He played in a day of a tight line, with the center on the line of scrimmage on every play, but his physique, speed and ability would make him readily adaptable to the present day game..."

== Lawyer and judge in Alaska ==
In 1906, Overfield moved to Nome, Alaska, where he practiced law from 1906 to 1909. In 1909, Overfield was appointed by President William Howard Taft as a federal district judge serving in the third judicial district of Alaska. Overfield later went into the mining business in Alaska and served as a director of Oatman Revenue Mines Co.

== Pioneer and rancher in Arizona ==
In 1917, Overfield moved to Arizona where he became involved in farming on a large scale in the Casa Grande Valley. He was a pioneer of the Casa Grande Valley and was a leader in the fight to bring water to the valley. He pioneered the Picacho and San Carlos Dam projects and was a long-time supporter of the Central Arizona Project.
