= Pat O'Dea =

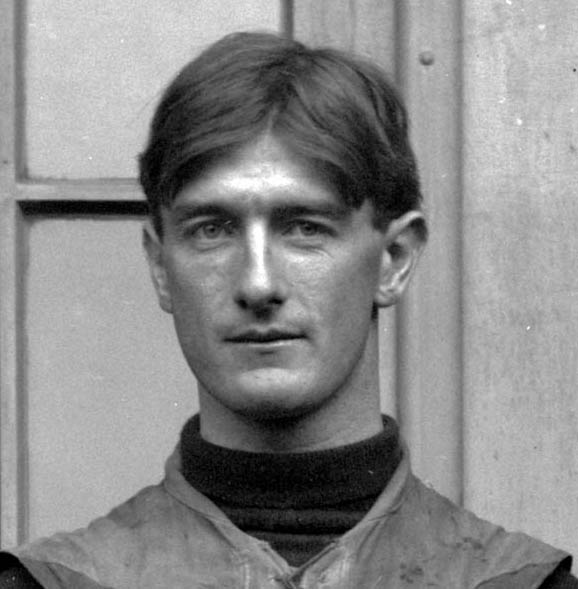
- O'Dea during his tenure as coach of Notre Dame, 1901

Biographical details
- Born: 17 March 1872; Kilmore, Victoria, Australia
- Died: 5 April 1962 (aged 90); San Francisco, California, U.S.

Playing career
- 1898–1899: Wisconsin
- Position: Fullback

Coaching career (HC unless noted)
- 1900–1901: Notre Dame
- 1902: Missouri
- 1903: Kirksville Osteopaths

Head coaching record
- Overall: 24–10–2

Accomplishments and honors

Awards
- Second-team All-American (1898); Third-team All-American (1899)
- College Football Hall of Fame; Inducted in 1962 (profile)
Australian rules football career
Personal information
- Original team: Melbourne
- Height: 183 cm (6 ft 0 in)
- Weight: 76 kg (168 lb)
- Position: Wing
Playing career
Years	Club	Games (Goals)
- North Melbourne
1893-95	Melbourne	
- Essendon
Representative team honours
Years	Team	Games (Goals)
1894	Victoria	1

Patrick John "Kangaroo Kicker" O'Dea (17 March 1872 – 5 April 1962) was an Australian rules and American football player and coach. An Australian by birth, O'Dea played Australian rules football for the Melbourne Football Club in the Victorian Football Association (VFA). In 1898 and 1899, O'Dea played American football at the University of Wisconsin–Madison in the United States, where he excelled in the kicking game. He then served as the head football coach at the University of Notre Dame from 1900 to 1901 and at the University of Missouri in 1902, compiling a career college football record of 19–7–2.

Following his Australian Rules and American Football careers, O'Dea deliberately disappeared from the public eye, however he helped popularise Australian rules football in the United States as a participation sport while working in San Francisco by training schoolchildren in the kicking game.

O'Dea was inducted into the College Football Hall of Fame as a player in 1962.

== Early life ==
O'Dea was born in Kilmore, Victoria, Australia, to an Irish-born father and a Victorian-born mother. He was the third child of seven children. As a child he attended Christian Brothers College and Xavier College. As a 16-year-old, he received a bronze medallion from the Royal Humane Society of Australasia for rescuing a woman at Mordialloc beach. O'Dea played Australian rules football for the Melbourne FC in the VFA before arriving at the University of Wisconsin–Madison to catch-up with his brother.

== Playing career ==
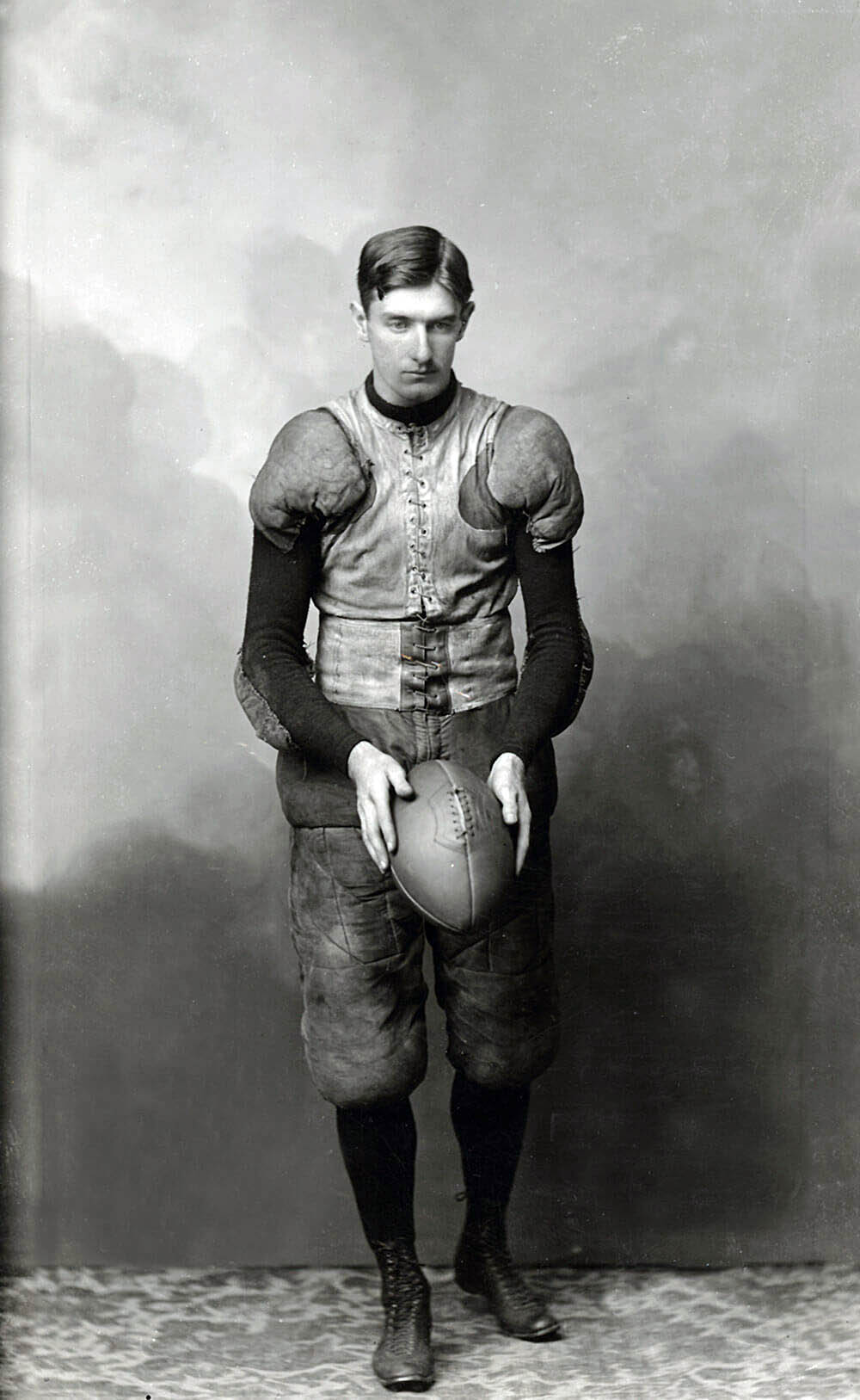
Photo session of O'Dea while playing at the University of Wisconsin, c. 1898

O'Dea played American football at the University of Wisconsin–Madison, where he was their star fullback from 1896–1899 and captained the 1898 and 1899 teams. In those days, fullbacks punted and often did the placekicking. In the 1898 edition of the Northwestern game, which was played in a blizzard, he drop-kicked a 62-yard field goal, and he had a 116-yard punt. This earned him the nickname "Kangaroo Kicker".

Wisconsin then headed into a Thanksgiving Day showdown with 1898 Western champions Michigan, with only the narrow loss to Yale marring their record. New songs were composed for the occasion, including “Oh, Pat O’Dea” to the popular tune “Margery”. The chorus ran:

"Oh Pat O’Dea, oh Pat O’Dea, We love you more and more.

Oh Pat O’Dea, oh Pat O’Dea, You’re the boy that we adore;

Your leg is ever sure and true, And always kicks a goal or two.

The team and rooters worship you. Oh Pat O’Dea."

In the 1899 game, he returned a kick-off 90 yards for a touchdown, and he had four field goals. He was selected as an All-American team member in 1899.

O'Dea also competed in track and field for Wisconsin as a hurdler.

== Coaching career ==
=== Notre Dame ===
From 1900 to 1901, O'Dea coached at the University of Notre Dame, compiling a 14–4–2 record.

=== Missouri ===
O'Dea was the tenth head football coach for the University of Missouri in Columbia, Missouri, serving for one season, in 1902, and compiled a record of 5–3.

== Later life ==
O'Dea introduced Australian rules at the University of Wisconsin and while working in San Francisco also trained schoolchildren, resulting in the adoption of the field kicking game known as "field ball" by the San Francisco public grammar schools.

He disappeared from public view in 1917, having decided that he didn't like being treated as a celebrity, and it was assumed by Wisconsin fans that O'Dea had died fighting in World War I. In 1934, he was discovered living under an assumed name in California and came back to Wisconsin to a hero's welcome. He later appeared on Bob Hope's All-American football team announcement shows. He was inducted into the College Football Hall of Fame on 3 April 1962. He died the next day at the University of California, San Francisco Medical Center.

Pat O'Dea died on 4 April 1962 at the age of 90 after an illness. While he was in hospital he received a get-well message from President John Kennedy. O'Dea's obituary in the New York Times commented on his kicking achievements including a 110-yard punt, though against Minnesota in 1897 and not Yale in 1899, and his 62-yard goal against Northwestern in 1898.

== Head coaching record ==
Year	Team	Overall	Conference	Standing	Bowl/playoffs
Notre Dame (Independent) (1900–1901)
1900	Notre Dame	6–3–1			
1901	Notre Dame	8–1–1			
Notre Dame:		14–4–2			
Missouri Tigers (Independent) (1902)
1902	Missouri	5–3			
Missouri:		5–3			
Kirksville Osteopaths (Independent) (1903)
1903	Kirksville Osteopaths	5–3			
Kirksville Osteopaths:		5–3			
Total:		24–10–2			
