= John Bennett =

John Bennett may refer to:

== Arts and entertainment ==
- John Bennett (actor) (1928–2005), British actor
- John Bennett (composer) (c. 1735–1784), British composer and organist
- John Bennett (drummer), drummer of the UK doom metal band The Prophecy
- John Bennett (potter) (1840–1907), British ceramic artist
- John Bennett, American trombonist, founding member of Kenny Ball and his Jazzmen
- Johnny Bennett (born 1998), British actor

== Military ==
- John A. Bennett (1936–1961), US Army private executed for the rape and attempted murder of an 11-year-old girl in Austria
- John Bradbury Bennet (sometimes misspelled Bennett, 1865–1930), American Army brigadier general
- John C. Bennett (general) (1923-1980) US Army major general and aide to President Nixon
- John Bennett, Royal Navy recipient of the Ushalov Medal for his role in the Second World War Arctic convoys

== Politics ==
- John Benett (1773–1852), British Member of Parliament for South Wiltshire
- John Bennett (fl. 1586–1589), MP for Heytesbury and Westbury
- John Bennett (Australian politician) (1942–2019), Tasmanian politician
- John Bennett (Canadian politician) (1832–1912), Ontario farmer and political figure
- John Bennett (English barrister) (c. 1658–1723), British politician
- John Bennett (Irish politician) (c. 1720–1792), Irish politician, barrister and judge
- John Bennett (Victorian politician) (1824–1859), lawyer and politician in colonial Victoria
- John Bennett (watchmaker) (1814–1897), watchmaker and briefly Sheriff of London
- John B. Bennett (1904–1964), U.S. Representative from Michigan
- John D. Bennett (1911–2005), New York politician and judge
- John E. Bennett (judge) (1833–1893), Arkansas Supreme Court Justice and South Dakota Supreme Court Justice
- John J. Bennett Jr. (1894–1967), American lawyer and politician
- John O. Bennett (born 1948), New Jersey state senator and acting governor (for 4 days)
- John R. Bennett (fl. 2010s), Oklahoma politician
- John Robert Bennett (1866–1941), Newfoundland politician
- John Bennet (judge) (1553–1627), English judge and politician

== Religion ==
- John C. Bennett (1804–1867), American physician and leader in the Latter Day Saint movement
- John George Bennett (1891–1957), American clergyman of the Roman Catholic Church
- John P. Bennett (1914–2011), Arawak priest and linguist

== Science and medicine ==
- John Caister Bennett (1914–1990), South African astronomer
- John E. Bennett (scientist) (born 1933), American physician-scientist
- John G. Bennett (1897–1974), British mathematician, scientist, technologist, industrial research director, mystic and author
- John Hughes Bennett (1812–1875), English physician, physiologist and pathologist
- John Joseph Bennett (1801–1876), British botanist
- John Makepeace Bennett (1921–2010), Australian pioneer of computer science
- John Whitchurch Bennett (1790–1853), British army officer and naturalist

== Sport ==
- John Bennett (long jumper) (born 1930), American long jumper, Olympic silver medal winner (1956)
- John Bennett (Australian footballer) (born 1960), Australian rules footballer
- John Bennett (cricketer, born 1777) (1777–1857), English cricketer
- John Bennett (cricketer, born 1864) (1864–1928), English cricketer
- John Bennett (diver) (1959–2004), first scuba diver beyond 1,000 feet
- John Bennett (field hockey) (1885–1973), British Olympic field hockey player
- John Bennett (footballer, born 1946), former professional footballer in England
- John Bennett (footballer, born 1949), former footballer in England
- John Bennett (hurler) (1934–2016), Irish hurler
- John Bennett (ice hockey) (born 1950), retired American ice hockey left winger
- Jon Bennett (racing driver) (born 1965), American racing driver
- John Bennett (racing driver) (born 2003), British racing driver
- Jack Bennett (rugby league), English rugby league footballer of the 1920s and 1930s

== Writing ==
- John Bennett (author) (1865–1956), author and illustrator of children's books
- John M. Bennett (born 1942), American poet

== Other ==
- John Bennett (educator) (born 1948), Australian education administrator
- John Bennett (watchmaker) (1814–1897), watchmaker and local politician
- John Cyril Bennett (1891–1957), British-born, US-based architect
- John G. Bennett (1883–1929), Kansas City resident and victim of the Bridge Murder case
- John S. Bennett (1911–1987), British spy during WWII
- John Tuson Bennett (1937–2013), Australian solicitor and legal historian involved in Holocaust denial
- John Wheeler-Bennett (1902–1975), English historian of German and diplomatic history
- John W. F. Bennett (c. 1875–1943), American civil engineer and football player
- John Bennett, a fictional character from the Ted franchise

== See also ==
- John Bennet (disambiguation)
- Jack Bennett (disambiguation)
- Jonathan Bennett (disambiguation)
- Bennett (name)
