= John E. Bennett =

John E. Bennett may refer to:

- John E. Bennett (judge) (1833–1893), Arkansas Supreme Court Justice and South Dakota Supreme Court Justice
- John E. Bennett (scientist) (born 1933), American physician and scientist

== See also ==
- John Bennett (disambiguation)
