= Jack Bennett =

Jack Bennett may refer to:

- Jack Bennett (screenwriter) known for You Are There (1953), Science Fiction Theatre (1955) and Cavalcade of America (1952).
- Jack Bennett (footballer, born 1913) (1913–1975), Australian footballer for Melbourne
- Jack Bennett (footballer, born 1920) (1920–1997), Australian footballer for Carlton
- Jack Bennett (footballer, born 1922) (1922–2009), Australian footballer for North Melbourne
- Jack Bennett (rugby league), rugby league footballer of the 1920s and 1930s
- Jack A. W. Bennett (1911–1981), New Zealand-born literary scholar
- John Caister Bennett (1914–1990; also known as Jack Bennett), South African civil servant and amateur astronomer

== See also ==
- John Bennett (disambiguation)
