= John Bennet =

John Bennet may refer to:

- John Bennet (mayor) (died before 1479), mayor of Dublin from 1456 to 1467
- John Bennet (judge) (1552/3–1627), English judge and MP accused of corruption
- John Bennet (composer) (c. 1575–after 1614), English composer
- John Bennet (writer) (died 1686), English writer
- John Bennet, 1st Baron Ossulston (1616–1695), English statesman
- John Bennet (MP) (1628–1663), English landowner and politician
- John Bennet (preacher) (1714–1759), English Methodist preacher
- John Bennet (archaeologist) (born 1957), British archaeologist and Professor of Aegean Archaeology at Sheffield University
- John Bennet, 5th Baronet of the Bennet baronets

== See also ==
- John Bennet Lawes (1814–1900), English entrepreneur and agricultural scientist
- John Bennett (disambiguation)
