= Jonathan Bennett =

Jonathan Bennett may refer to:

- Jonathan Bennett (actor) (born 1981), American actor
- Jonathan Bennett (mathematician), British mathematician and winner of the Whitehead Prize
- Jonathan Bennett (philosopher) (1930–2024), British philosopher
- Jonathan Manu Bennett (born 1969), New Zealand actor
- Jonathan Bennett (born 1973), creator of AutoIt

== See also ==
- John Bennett (disambiguation)
