= William Cunningham (American football) =

American football player (1872–1957)

William R. Cunningham
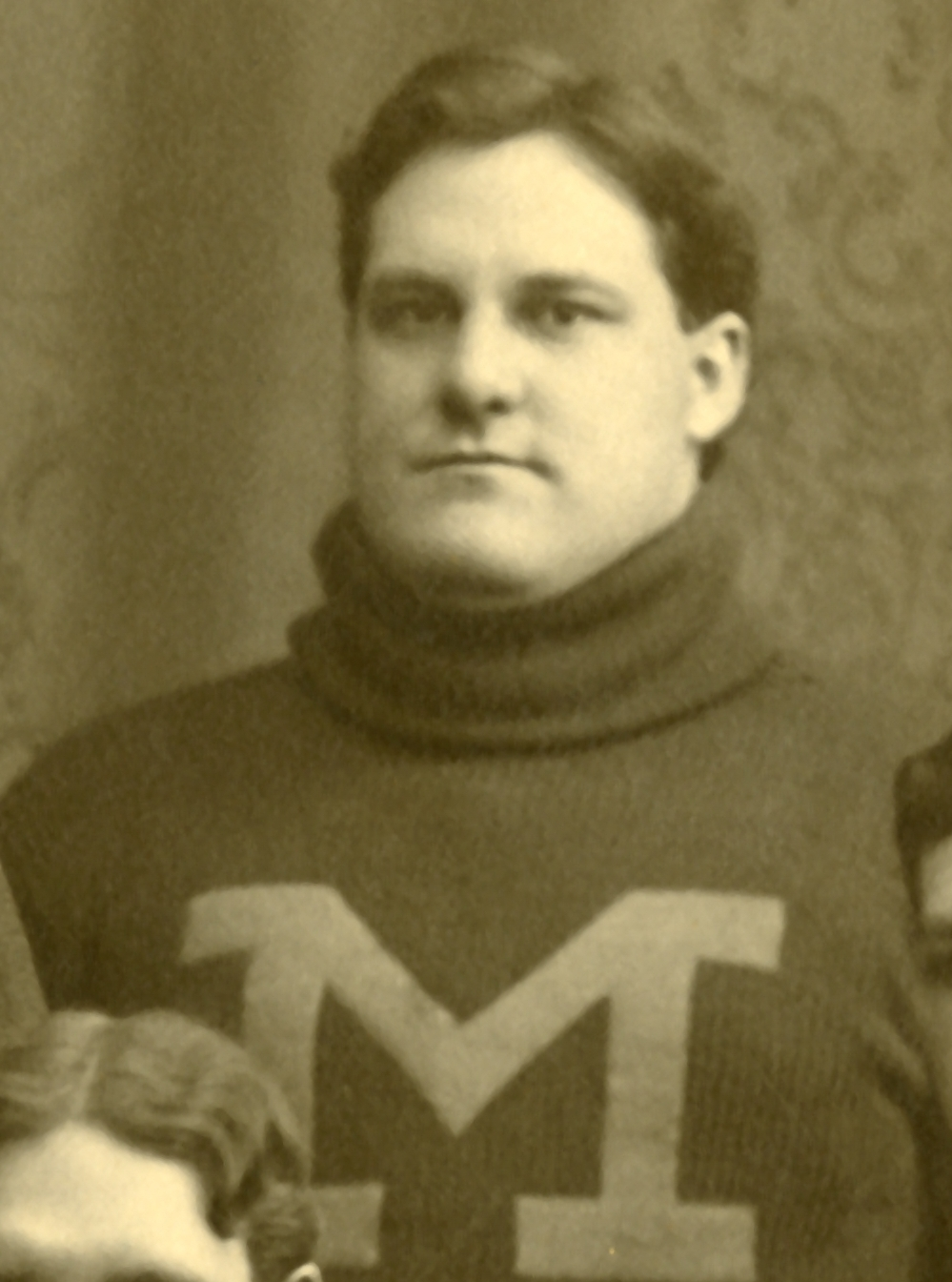

Profile
- Position: Center

Personal information
- Born: July 13, 1872; Volant, Pennsylvania, U.S.
- Died: September 1957 (aged 84); Grove City, Pennsylvania, U.S.

Career information
- College: Michigan (1897–1899)

Awards and highlights
- Consensus All-American (1898); Second-team All-American (1899)

William Ralph Cunningham (July 13, 1872 – September 1957) was an American football center for the University of Michigan, and the first All-American selection for the Michigan Wolverines football program.

Cunningham was born at Volant, Pennsylvania in July 1872. His father, Valentine Cunningham, was a native of Grove City, Pennsylvania.

Cunningham was a 5-foot, 9-inch, 180-pound native of Grove City, Pennsylvania who played center for the University of Michigan Wolverines from 1897 to 1899. Chosen as an All-American in 1898, he was the first University of Michigan football player to be so honored. The 1898 Wolverines went 10-0 and won the Western Conference (now known as the Big Ten Conference) championship. The first great Michigan football team, the 1898 group outscored its opponents 205 to 26. They shut out Michigan Agricultural College (39-0) and Notre Dame (23-0) before traveling to Chicago for a final game against Amos Alonzo Stagg's University of Chicago team on November 24, 1898. Led by Cunningham, Michigan came out on top, 12–11, for its first Western Conference championship.

A newspaper account described Michigan's victory this way: "The western football championship goes to Michigan. On a field that was simply perfect for fast football, and before a crowd of 12,000 the maroons of Chicago went down before the maize and blue of Michigan today by a score of 12 to 11. . . . The Michigan line, in which big holes were torn by the light Northwestern team, was simply impregnable today, with the exception of about ten minutes in the second half, when the Chicago men pushed their opponents aside with an apparent ease."

Another article noted: "Michigan, with the exception of one or two double passes, relied almost altogether on straight football, line bucking and runs around the end. Chicago, on the contrary, used trick plays throughout but the team work was of a high order, as shown by both teams."

Based on his performance in the Chicago game, Stagg recommended Cunningham as an All-American. At that time, the All-American selections were made by Caspar Whitney, who preceded Walter Camp in that role. Michigan's 12–11 victory over Chicago in 1898 also served as the inspiration for Louis Elbel to write The Victors, Michigan's fight song. Elbel's lyric, "Champions of the West," refers to Michigan's having won the Western Conference championship for the first time in the school's history.

Cunningham's selection as an All-American in 1898 "broke the unwritten tradition that All-Americans had to come from Yale, Harvard, Princeton or a few other Eastern schools."

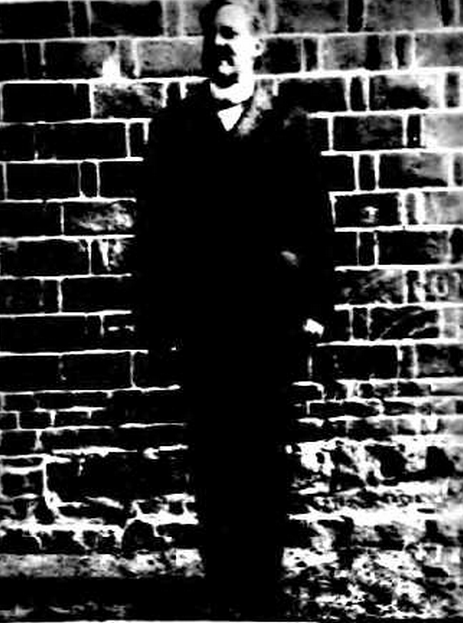
Passport photograph of Cunningham, 1921

Cunningham became a medical missionary in China. In a December 1921 passport applications, Cunningham identified himself as a physician with his permanent residence in Grove City, Pennsylvania. He stated that he had left the United States in October 1904, and returned in October 1912. He traveled to China again as a medical missionary in 1922.

Cunningham was the first in a long line of University of Michigan centers to be named All-American, including Germany Schulz, Ernie Vick, Jack Blott, Maynard Morrison, Chuck Bernard, David Molk, and Olusegun Oluwatimi.

In 1955, Cunningham was named to the all-time Medical All-American Team, composed of former All-American football players who later became doctors. The list was compiled and published by "Spectrum," a medical journal. At that time, Cunningham was retired and living in Grove City, Pennsylvania. He died in 1957 at the age of 84.

In 2005, Cunningham was selected as one of the 100 greatest Michigan football players of all time by the "Motown Sports Revival," ranking 30th on the all-time team.

== See also ==
- List of Michigan Wolverines football All-Americans
