= Charles Widman =

American football player (1879–1944)

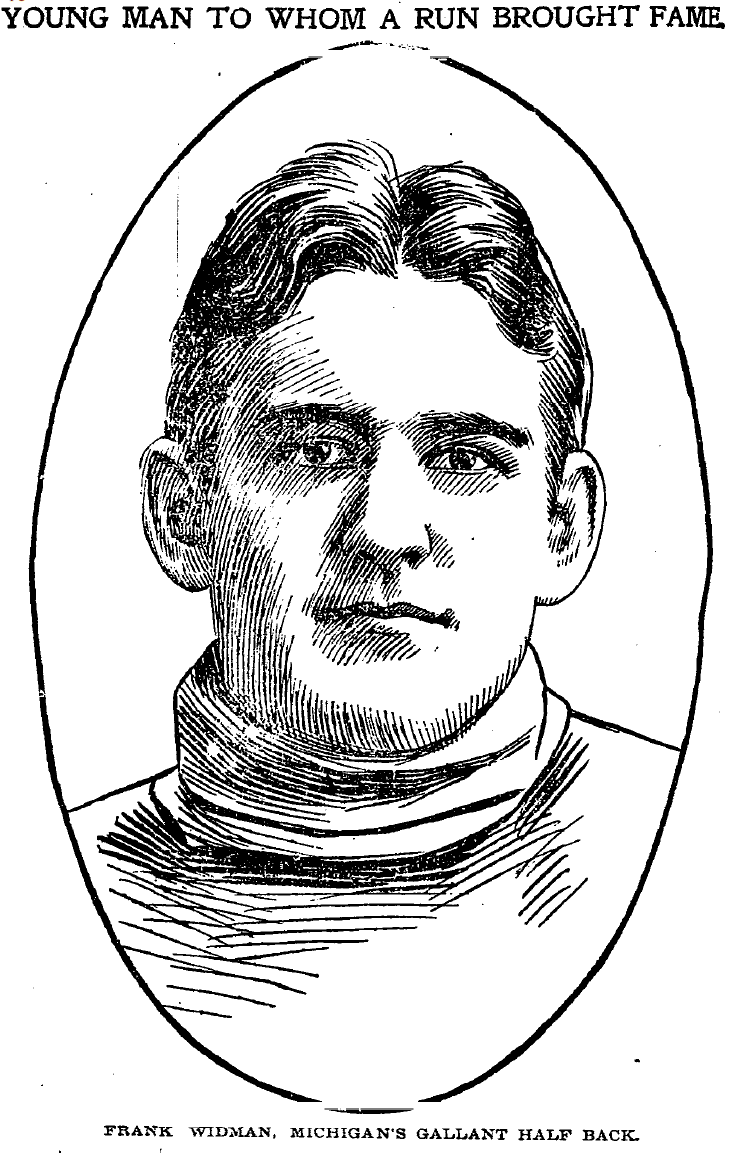
- Portrait of Widman from the Chicago Daily Tribune, Nov. 25, 1898

Profile
- Position: Halfback

Personal information
- Born: June 17, 1879; Rochester, New York, U.S.
- Died: December 19, 1944 (aged 65); Detroit, Michigan, U.S.
- Listed height: 5 ft 6 in (1.68 m)
- Listed weight: 162 lb (73 kg)

Career information
- High school: Central High School (Detroit, MI)
- College: Michigan

Career history
- 1898: Michigan

Charles Henry Widman (June 17, 1879 – December 19, 1944) was an American football player and businessman.

== Early life ==
Widman was born in Rochester, New York in either 1878 or 1879. He was the son of John C. Widman and Lena Keifhaber Widman. The family moved to Detroit when Charles was two years old.

== University of Michigan ==
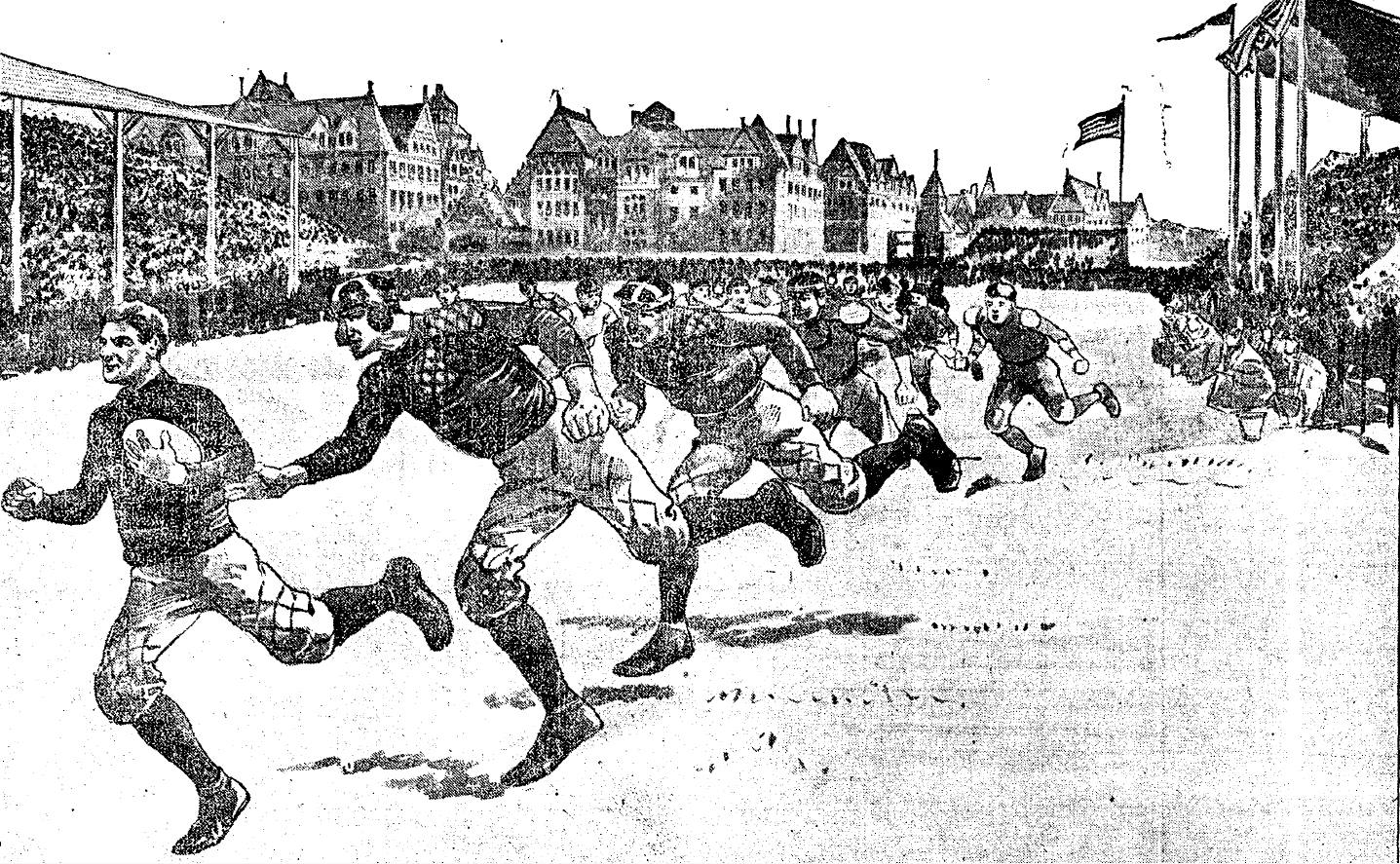
"Widman of Michigan, Pursued by Chicago Players, Runs for Glory and a Touchdown"

Widman attended Detroit High School and enrolled at the University of Michigan in 1898 as a freshman in the law school. He was the starting left halfback on the undefeated 1898 Michigan Wolverines football team that won the school's first Western Conference championship. He scored both of Michigan's touchdowns in the 1898 championship game against the University of Chicago. His 65-yard touchdown run against Chicago was described as follows in The Michigan Alumnus in December 1898:

Widman's now famous run of sixty-five yards through Chicago's territory for a touchdown clinched the victory which Michigan was bound to win and was perhaps the feature of the game. As the result of his dash down the field with the whole Chicago team after him Michigan has a new football hero and the history of western football is enriched by the story of a run as thrilling as was ever made on any gridiron."

Louis Elbel, a University of Michigan student, was so inspired by Widman's sixty-five yard run and the subsequent outcome of the game that he went to his sister's house that afternoon immediately following the game and composed "The Victors," which is the University of Michigan's well-known fight song.

After the game, the Chicago Daily Tribune published a story on Widman in which it opined that he "promises to become one of the greatest football stars Michigan has ever produced." He was a member of the Sigma Chi fraternity at Michigan.

During the fall of 1898, a Detroit newspaper published an article suggesting that Widman had not graduated from high school and was only in Ann Arbor to play football and that he had no intention to remain after the football season concluded. The Michigan Alumnus in November 1898 defended Widman: "There is no more promising or prominent candidate for football honors than Charlie Widman, the plucky little half back who has been making such a good record." The charges were investigated at a meeting of faculty members. Professor Albert Pattengill announced the faculty's decision finding that Widman was "taking the full amount of course work laid out for him by the dean of the law department" and concluding there was no foundation for the charges that Widman did not intend to return to college after the Christmas vacation.

== Later years and family ==
Widman did not return to Michigan in the fall of 1899 and subsequently played football for the Detroit Athletic Club. In 1900, Widman along with his father and brother formed J.C. Widman and Sons Furniture Company in Detroit. On October 15, 1902, he was married to Eleanor Cecilia Frees at Detroit. He served as vice president of the family furniture business. During World War I, the family business began manufacturing wood airplane parts. After the war, the company began building automobile bodies. In 1926, the Widman company merged with J. W. Murray Manufacturing Co. to form Murray Corp. of America, a major producer of automobile coachworks. Widman was Murray Corp.'s vice president in charge of sales and a director of the Murray Corp. of America from the tie of the merger until 1942.

Widman died at Harper Hospital in Detroit after suffering a heart attack in 1944.
