= Alanson Weeks =

American football player and medical doctor (1877–1947)

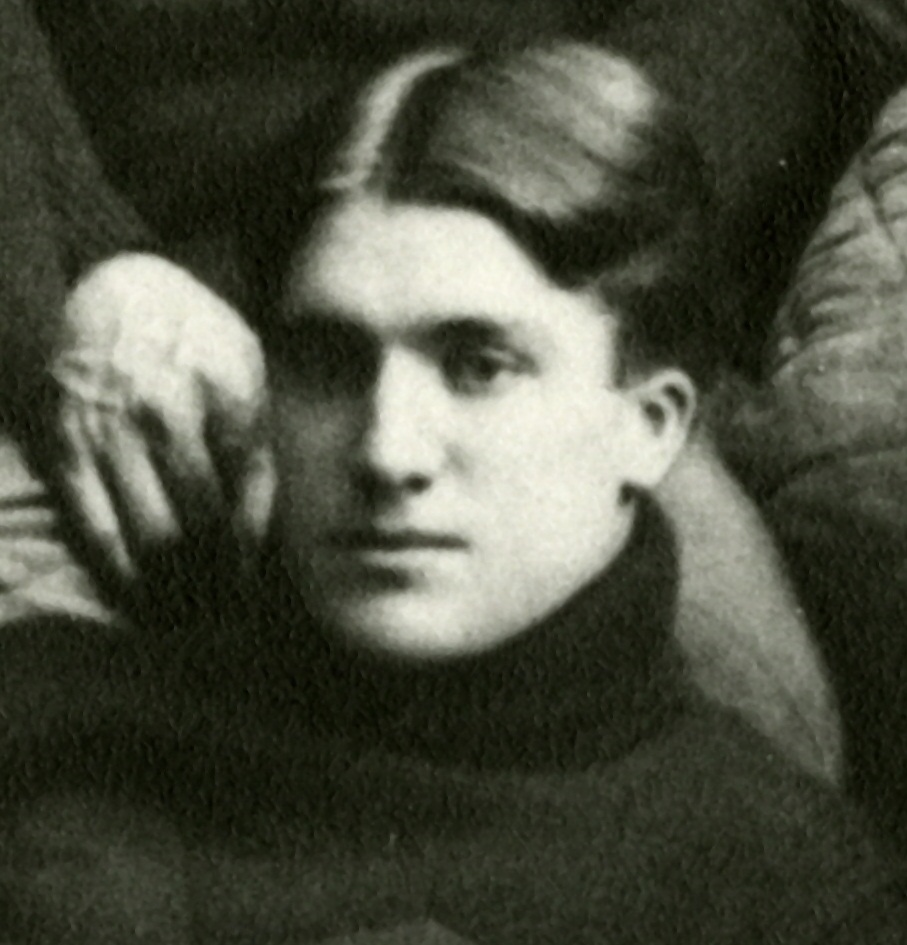
- Weeks cropped from 1898 University of Michigan team photograph
- Born: September 15, 1877; Allegan, Michigan, United States
- Died: November 25, 1947 (aged 70); San Francisco, California
- Education: University of Michigan
- Known for: Football player, Medical doctor

Alanson Weeks (September 15, 1877 – November 25, 1947) was an American football player and medical doctor.

Weeks was born in Allegan, Michigan, in 1877. He was the son of Julia Shoemaker and Capt. Harrison Weeks. He enrolled at the University of Michigan and played college football as a fullback for the undefeated 1898 Michigan Wolverines football team that were declared "Champions of the West." His younger brother, Boss Weeks, was the captain for Fielding H. Yost's "Point-a-Minute" teams at Michigan.

Weeks graduated from the University of Michigan in 1899 with a medical degree. He moved to San Francisco, California, where he became a surgeon. He was in that city at the time of the 1906 San Francisco earthquake and fire. From 1912 until 1919 (except for the time in military service), he was the chief surgeon of San Francisco's emergency hospital service. For many years, he also served as a professor of surgery at the University of California Medical School. He was also "credited with developing many surgical procedures" which became common practice.

Weeks served as a Major in the U.S. Army Medical Corps during World War I. He was awarded the Army Distinguished Service Medal for meritorious and distinguished service for his work as a surgeon and director of surgical teams at the front during the Second Battle of the Marne, the Battle of Saint-Mihiel, and the Meuse-Argonne Offensive.

Weeks later served as the chief surgeon at St. Luke's Hospital in San Francisco, holding that position until his retirement in 1946.

In 1947, Weeks died of a heart attack at the Pacific Union Club in San Francisco. He had been living at the Club since his wife died in 1943.
