= 1898 Michigan Wolverines football team =

American college football season

1898 Michigan Wolverines football
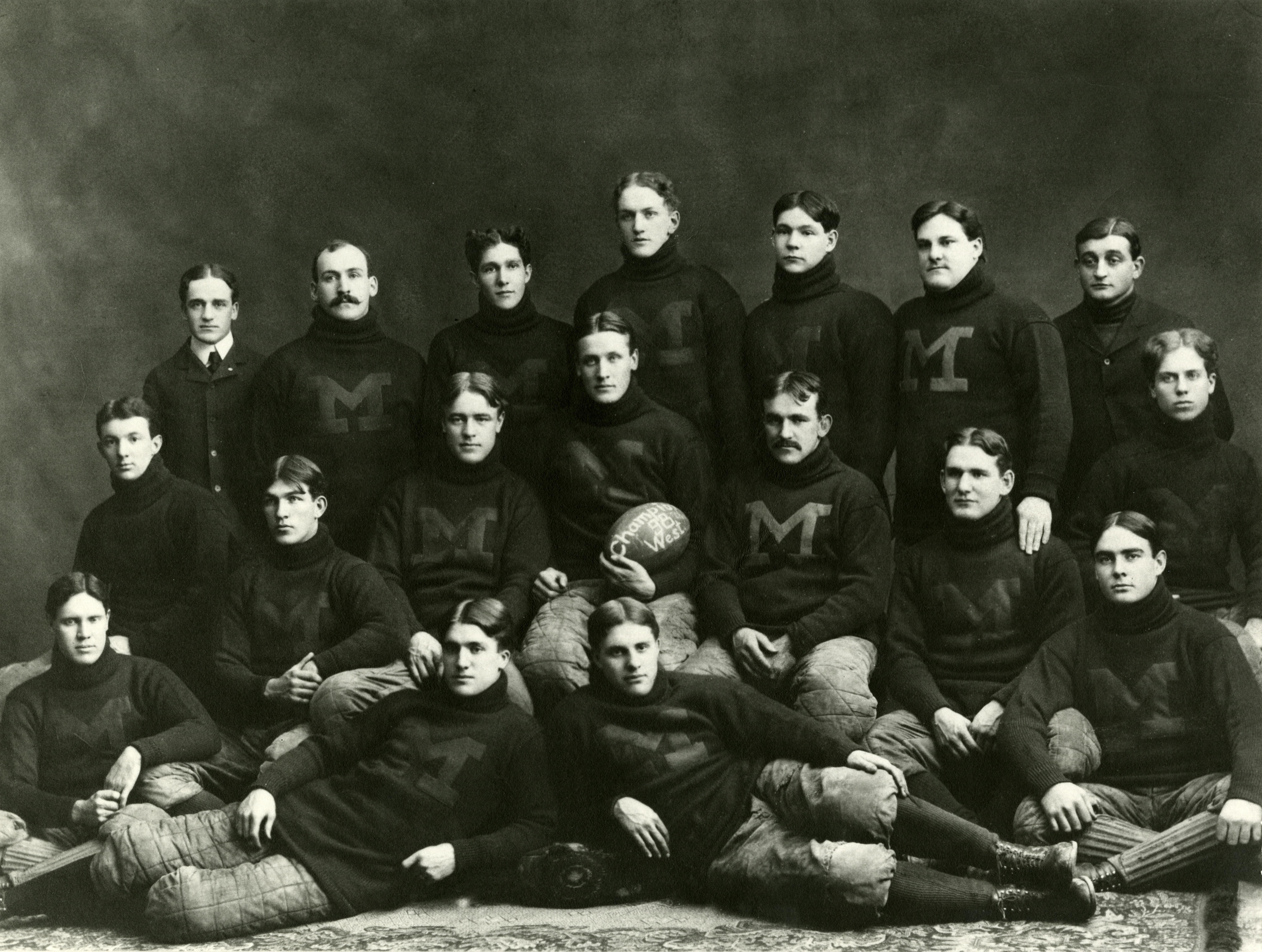

Western Conference champion
- Conference: Western Conference
- Record: 10–0 (3–0 Western)
- Head coach: Gustave Ferbert (2nd season)
- Captain: John W. F. Bennett
- Home stadium: Regents Field

1898 Western Conference football standings
	Conf.					Overall
Team	W		L		T	W		L		T
Michigan $	3	–	0	–	0	10	–	0	–	0
Chicago	3	–	1	–	0	14	–	2	–	1
Wisconsin	2	–	1	–	0	9	–	1	–	0
Illinois	1	–	1	–	0	4	–	5	–	0
Minnesota	1	–	2	–	0	4	–	5	–	0
Purdue	0	–	1	–	0	3	–	3	–	0
Northwestern	0	–	4	–	0	9	–	4	–	1
$ – Conference champion

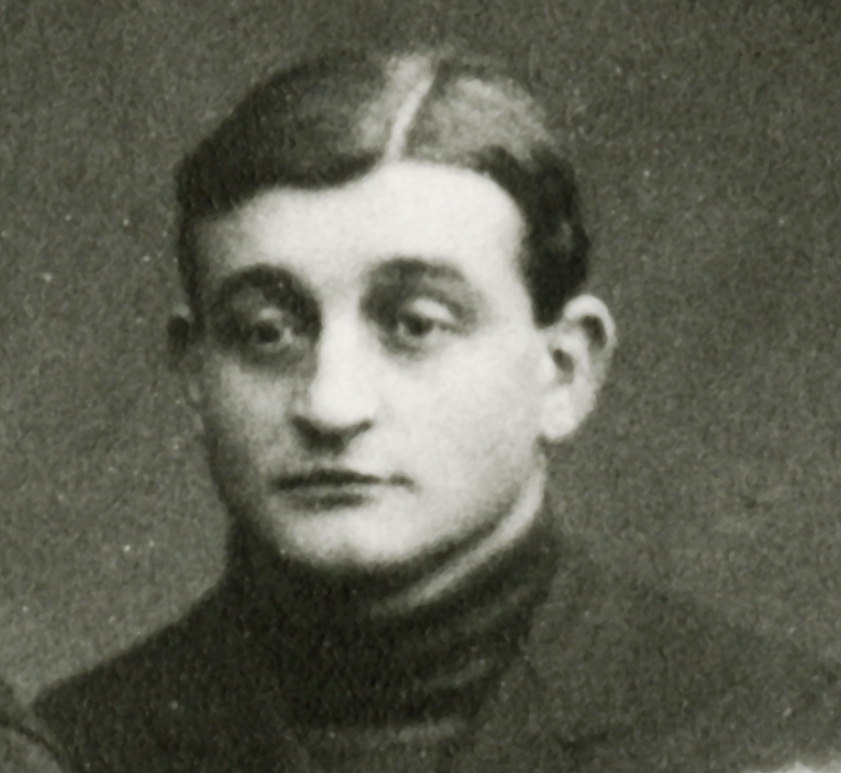
Head coach Gustave Ferbert quit after the 1899 season to prospect for gold in Alaska, returning several years later as a millionaire.

The 1898 Michigan Wolverines football team represented the University of Michigan in the 1898 Western Conference football season. With Gustave Ferbert in his second year as head coach, the team compiled an undefeated 10–0 record, outscored its opponents 205–26, and won the Western Conference (now known as the Big Ten Conference) championship for the first time in the school's history.

The 1898 season included the first meeting in the Michigan - Michigan State football rivalry with Michigan winning the inaugural game by a score of 39–0. The 1898 Wolverines shut out a total of six opponents, including Notre Dame (23–0). The team concluded its season by playing Amos Alonzo Stagg's University of Chicago team for the Western Conference championship. The Wolverines beat the favored Chicago Maroons by a 12–11 score in a game that inspired Louis Elbel to write Michigan's fight song "The Victors".

Several Michigan players received post-season honors. Halfback Charles Widman was the team's scoring leader with 12 touchdowns, including a 65-yard touchdown run against Chicago. Center William Cunningham was selected as a first-team All-American by Caspar Whitney in Harper's Weekly – the first Michigan football player to receive first-team All-American honors. Walter Camp selected two Michigan players, Cunningham and tackle Allen Steckle, as second-team All-Americans. Five Wolverines were chosen as first-team players on Caspar Whitney's All-Western team: William Caley at halfback, Cunningham at center, Steckle at tackle, and Neil Snow and John W. F. Bennett at the ends.

== Schedule ==
Date	Time	Opponent	Site	Result	Attendance
October 1		Michigan State Normal*	Regents Field; Ann Arbor, MI	W 21–0	
October 8		Kenyon*	Regents Field; Ann Arbor, MI	W 29–0	
October 12		Michigan Agricultural*	Regents Field; Ann Arbor, MI (rivalry)	W 39–0	
October 15		Western Reserve*	Regents Field; Ann Arbor, MI	W 18–0	
October 19		Case*	Regents Field; Ann Arbor, MI	W 23–5	
October 22		Notre Dame*	Regents Field; Ann Arbor, MI (rivalry)	W 23–0	
October 31		Alumni (exhibition)^{†}	Regents Field; Ann Arbor, MI	W 11–2	
November 5		at Northwestern	Evanston, IL (rivalry)	W 6–5	
November 12		vs. Illinois	Detroit Athletic Club; Detroit, MI (rivalry)	W 12–5	3,500
November 19		Beloit*	Regents Field; Ann Arbor, MI	W 22–0	
November 24	2:30 p.m.	at Chicago	Marshall Field; Chicago, IL (rivalry)	W 12–11	12,000
*Non-conference game; ^{†}Homecoming

== Season summary ==
=== Preseason ===
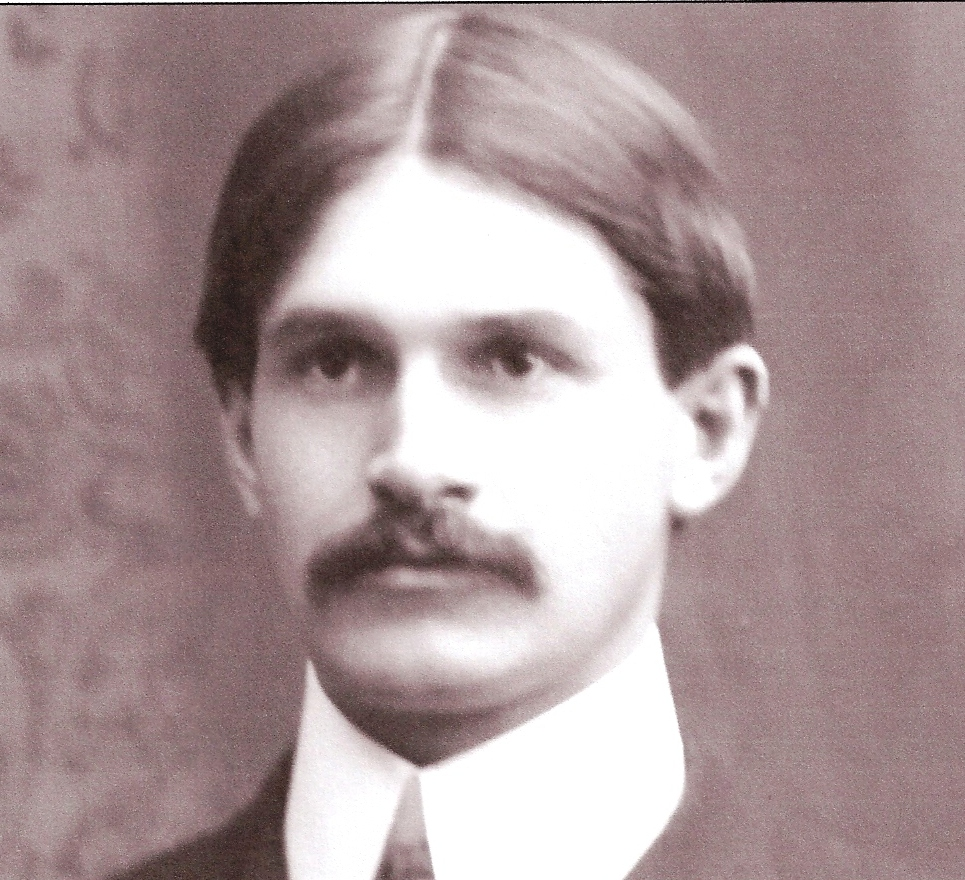
Athletic director Charles A. Baird

By 1897, the finances of the Michigan Athletic Association under constantly changing student control were "at a low ebb." In 1898, the Association asked Charles A. Baird, formerly a student manager of the football team, to return to Ann Arbor as the "graduate manager" or "superintendent" of athletics. Baird was given "complete control of all branches of athletics at Michigan" in order to induce him to return to the school. One of Baird's first moves was to persuade trainer Keene Fitzpatrick to rejoin him at the school. Fitzpatrick had been the trainer of the 1894 and 1895 teams, but spent the 1896 and 1897 seasons as the trainer for Yale's football team. Baird and Fitzpatrick have been credited with much of the success of the 1898 football team. Gustave Ferbert, who had played on the 1893–1895 teams managed by Baird, stayed on as coach in 1898.

The 1897 team had finished with a record of 6–1–1, losing the Western Conference championship on the last day of the season to the University of Chicago. Several key linemen from the 1897 team returned in 1898, including ends John W. F. Bennett and Clayton Teetzel, tackle Allen Steckle, guard William Caley, and center William Cunningham. However, the starters from the 1897 backfield were lost to graduation and had to be replaced largely with untested players, including quarterbacks Charles E. Street and William Wilson Talcott, fullback Alanson Weeks, and freshman halfback Charles Widman. Fullback Leo J. Keena returned from the 1897 team, but he had contracted malaria while serving during the summer of 1898 in the Spanish–American War and was unable to play beyond the fourth game of the season.

=== Michigan State Normal ===
Michigan State Normal at Michigan

Team	1	2	Total
Michigan State Normal	0	0	0
• Michigan	16	5	21

- Date: October 1, 1898
- Location: Regents Field • Ann Arbor, Michigan
- Referee: J. C. Knight (Princeton)

Michigan opened its 1898 season with a 21–0 win over Michigan State Normal School (now known as Eastern Michigan University). The game was considered to be "essentially a practice game" in which the coaches played 24 men at different times to assess their abilities. Michigan's first touchdown came after three minutes of play on a drive that started on Normal's 40-yard line. Waldo Avery ran around end for 22 yards and subsequently ran across the goal line from the 10-yard line. Leo J. Keena kicked the goal from touchdown. George Whitcomb scored the second touchdown on a 15-yard run, and Neil Snow scored the third touchdown of the half after recovering a fumbled punt.

The second half was reported to be a "very poor exhibition of football" with substitutes playing at most positions. Michigan's sole points of the second half came on a fumble recovery by William Louis Day. Michigan missed the extra point kicks on its final three touchdowns. (Touchdowns were worth five points and goals from touchdown (or extra points) worth one point under 1898 rules.) Guy Blencoe also missed a field goal from placement from the 40-yard line in the second half. In assessing the team's performance, the Detroit Free Press opined that the team was green, ragged, and slow, and concluded that "the coaches certainly have their work cut out for them if they are going to make a winning team out of the raw material at hand."

Michigan's starting lineup against Normal was Snow (left end), Wood (left tackle), France (left guard), Carr (center), Kramer (right guard), Steckle (right tackle), Bennett (right end), Talcott (quarterback), Avery (left halfback), Van Cleve (right halfback), and Keena (fullback). Players appearing in the game as substitutes for Michigan were White (left tackle), Brown (center), Smith (center), Allen (right guard), Dyer (right guard), Day (right tackle), Mohr (left halfback), Whitcomb (right halfback), Blencoe (right halfback), Malone (right halfback), Weeks (fullback), and Hoover (fullback).

=== Kenyon ===
Kenyon at Michigan

Team	1	2	Total
Kenyon	0	0	0
• Michigan	6	23	29

- Date: October 8, 1898
- Location: Regents Field • Ann Arbor, Michigan
- Referee: J. C. Knight (Princeton)

On October 8, 1898, Michigan defeated the team from Kenyon College, 29–0. In the first half, the Kenyon eleven "played a snappy game" and drove the ball to Michigan's two-yard line before the Michigan line held. Michigan led 6–0 at halftime. In the second half, Michigan added 23 points. Waldo Avery, Charles Widman, Leo J. Keena, Guy Blencoe, and Neil Snow scored touchdowns for Michigan. Keena kicked four goals from touchdown. In its account of the game, the Chicago Daily Tribune wrote that Whitcomb, Widman, and Talcott "put up the best game."

The game was played in 20-minute halves. Michigan's starting lineup against Kenyon was Teetzel (left end), Wood (left tackle), Caley (left guard), Brown (center), France (right guard), Steckle (right tackle), Snow (right end), Barabee (quarterback), Avery (left halfback), Whitcomb (right halfback), and Keena (fullback). Players appearing as substitutes for Michigan were Hicks (left end), Dye (center), Allen (right guard), McDonald (right tackle), Talcott (quarterback), Widman (left halfback), and Blencoe (right halfback).

=== Michigan Agricultural ===
The 1898 season marked the first game played in the intrastate rivalry between Michigan and Michigan State (then known as Michigan Agricultural College). The teams met in Ann Arbor on October 12, 1898, and Michigan won 39–0. The Detroit Free Press wrote that the game was "essentially a practice game," as Michigan played 25 different players during the game. Charles Widman scored two touchdowns and was "the strongest ground-gainer" for Michigan. Additional Michigan touchdowns were scored by Clayton Teetzel, Clifford Barabee, Allen Steckle, and Fred William Hartsburg. Teetzel and Leo J. Keena kicked two extra points each. In the second half, Keena also kicked a field goal from a place-kick, "the first time a Michigan eleven has ever scored in that fashion."

The game was played in 20-minute halves. Michigan's starting lineup against Michigan Agricultural was Teetzel (left end), Day (left tackle), Caley (left guard), Smith (center), France (right guard), McDonald (right tackle), Snow (right end), Talcott (quarterback), Widman (left halfback), Whitcomb (right halfback), and Barabee (fullback). Players appearing in the game as substitutes for Michigan were Hicks (left end), Wood (left tackle), Kramer (left guard), Brown (center), Dye (center), Bennett (right guard), Steckle (right tackle), Richardson (right end), Hartsburg (quarterback), Weeks (quarterback and right halfback), Baldwin (left halfback), Keena (fullback). The referee was J. C. Knight.

After the 1898 shutout, Michigan sent its freshman team against Michigan Agricultural for the next three years. The two rivals have played each other more than 100 times since the inaugural meeting in 1898.

=== Western Reserve ===
Western Reserve at Michigan

Team	1	2	Total
Western Reserve	0	0	0
• Michigan	6	12	18

- Date: October 15, 1898
- Location: Regents Field • Ann Arbor, Michigan
- Referee: R. M. Simmons

On October 15, 1898, Michigan defeated the team from Adelbert College, a branch of Western Reserve University, 18–0. George Whitcomb scored two touchdowns for Michigan, and Charles Widman scored one. Whitcomb made "the star run of the game" on a 55-yard touchdown run in the second half. Charles Street kicked two extra points, and Leo J. Keena kicked one. The game was played in halves of 25 and 20 minutes. Michigan's starting lineup against Western Reserve was Teetzel (left end), Wood (left tackle), Caley (left guard), Dye (center), France (right guard), Steckle (right tackle), Snow (right end), Talcott (quarterback), Widman (left halfback), Barabee (right halfback), and Hannan (fullback). Players appearing in the game as substitutes for Michigan were White (left tackle), Brown (center), McDonald (right tackle), Blencoe (left halfback), Whitcomb (right halfback), Keena (fullback), and Street (fullback). The referee was R. M. Simmons.

=== Case ===
On Wednesday, October 19, 1898, Michigan played a mid-week game against the team from the Case Scientific School from Cleveland. Michigan won the game, 23–5. On Michigan's opening drive, William Caley missed on a place kick for a field goal from the 20-yard line. Clifford Barabee scored Michigan's first touchdown ten minutes into the first half. Neil Snow kicked the goal after touchdown. Charles Widman scored Michigan's second touchdown with three minutes left in the first half, and Snow again kicked the goal after touchdown. According to The Michigan Alumnus, "Widman was the star ground gainer for Michigan and his two long runs of 45 and 33 yards were clever exhibitions." On the kickoff that followed Michigan's second touchdown, the Wolverines were called for holding, and Case took over at Michigan's 25-yard line. Case took advantage of its field position with a drop kick for a field goal (good for five points) from the 35-yard line. Widman scored another touchdown just before the close of the first half, and Snow successfully kicked his third goal from touchdown. In the second half, play was impaired by the onset of darkness. Allen Steckle scored the only points of the second half on a 12-yard run.

The game was played in halves of 20 and 15 minutes. Michigan's starting lineup against Case was Teetzel (left end), White (left tackle), Caley (left guard), Brown (center), France (right guard), Steckle (right tackle), Snow (right end), Talcott (quarterback), Widman (left halfback), Barabee (right halfback), and Weeks (fullback). Players appearing in the game as substitutes for Michigan were Smith (center) and Street (fullback). The referee was Clarke from Chicago.

=== Notre Dame ===
Notre Dame at Michigan

Team	1	2	Total
Kenyon	0	0	0
• Michigan	11	12	23

- Date: October 22, 1898
- Location: Regents Field • Ann Arbor, Michigan
- Referee: J. C. Knight (Princeton)

On October 22, 1898, Michigan played Notre Dame for the first time since 1888. Michigan won the game, 23–0, in Ann Arbor. William Caley scored three touchdowns in the game, and Clifford Barabee scored Michigan's other touchdown, while Neil Snow was successful on three of four attempts at goals from touchdown. Charles Widman set up the first touchdown with a 45-yard run around Notre Dame's left end before he was tackled at the three-yard line. Caley carried the ball across the goal line, but Snow's kick for goal failed. Michigan's second touchdown came late in the first half after Fleming fumbled a punt, and Barabee recovered the ball at the Notre Dame 45-yard line. Widman ran for 26 yards, and Barabee then gained another 10 yards. Caley ran the ball across the goal line from the three-yard line, and Snow kicked the goal.

On the opening play of the second half, Caley kicked off to Notre Dame. The kick was fumbled by Notre Dame, and Caley recovered the ball at Notre Dame's 48-yard line. Michigan drove the ball to the three-yard line, and Barabee scored the touchdown. Michigan's fourth touchdown was set up by a 25-yard punt return by William Wilson Talcott. Caley scored from the four-yard line, and Snow kicked the extra point. At the end of the game, the biggest crowd of the season "rushed the players off the field in honor."

Notre Dame's highly touted 6-foot, 4-inch, 256-pound center, John Eggeman, was held in check by Michigan's backup center Harry Brown. The Chicago Daily Tribune reported: "Eggeman, the big center rush of the visitors, did not prove nearly so hard a proposition for Brown as was anticipated, and taken altogether the visitors' strength was considerably overestimated, if they played their game today." The Irish managed only one first down and lost five fumbles. Notre Dame halfback George Lins punched a Michigan player in frustration, claiming he had been held throughout the game by Michigan's quarterback. Notre Dame suspended Lins from the following week's game. The field in Ann Arbor was reported to be a "mudbath," which favored the Wolverines who played the game in long cleats.

Michigan' starting lineup against Notre Dame was Bennett (left end), White (left tackle), Caley (left guard), Brown (center), France (right guard), Steckle (right tackle), Snow (right end), Talcott (quarterback), Widman (left halfback), Barabee (right halfback), and Weeks (fullback). Players appearing as substitutes for Michigan were Teetzel (left end), McDonald (left tackle), Blencoe (right halfback), and Street (fullback). The game was played in 20-minute halves.

=== Alumni game ===
Alumni at Michigan

Team	1	2	Total
Alumni	0	2	2
• Michigan	6	5	11

- Date: October 31, 1898
- Location: Regents Field • Ann Arbor, Michigan
- Referee: Frank Carter (Detroit Athletic Club)

On October 31, 1898, the Michigan football team played the school's alumni as part of the school's homecoming celebration. The Michigan band met a train carrying 300 alumni from Detroit and led the alumni to Regents Field. The Michigan varsity defeated the alumni by a score of 11–2. Allen Steckle scored the game's first touchdown after seven minutes of play, and Neil Snow kicked the extra point. In the second half, Charles Widman scored a second touchdown giving the varsity an 11-0 lead. The alumni's two points were scored when Edwin Denby forced Charles Street to make a safety on a punt. The game was considered an exhibition and did not count toward Michigan's season record. The university's Student Athletic Association began sponsoring alumni games in 1897. The university band, glee and banjo clubs, and fraternities, participated in the event. Athletic director Charles A. Baird noted that the alumni games were organized to gain alumni support for the school's athletic teams, to allow the current athletes to benefit from the experience and knowledge of the alumni players, and to bring the alumni together "so that they may renew old acquaintances and promote good fellowship, college spirit and interest in their alma mater."

The alumni game was played in 25- and 20-minute halves. The starting lineup for the varsity was Bennett (left end), Avery (left tackle), Caley (left guard), Cunningham (center), France (right guard), Steckle (right tackle), Snow (right end), Street (quarterback), Widman (left halfback), Whitcomb (right halfback), and Weeks (fullback). Varsity substitutes were Teetzel (left end), White (left tackle), Dye (left guard), Talcott (quarterback), Baldwin (right halfback), McDonald (fullback), and Hannan (fullback). The starting lineup for the alumni team was Loomis Hutchinson (left end), Giovanni R. "Count" Villa (left tackle), "Pa" Henninger (left guard), Edwin Denby (center), Forrest M. Hall (right guard), William C. Malley (right tackle), Gilmore D. Price (right end), Howard Felver (quarterback), Gustave Ferbert (left halfback), Horace L. Dyer (right halfback), and Ignatius M. Duffy (fullback). Alumni substitutes were M. Snow (right guard), Roger Sherman (right end), and Le Roy (right halfback).

=== At Northwestern ===
Michigan at Northwestern

Team	1	2	Total
Northwestern	5	0	5
• Michigan	6	0	6

- Date: November 5, 1898
- Location: Evanston, Illinois
- Referee: Fred Hayner (Lake Forest)

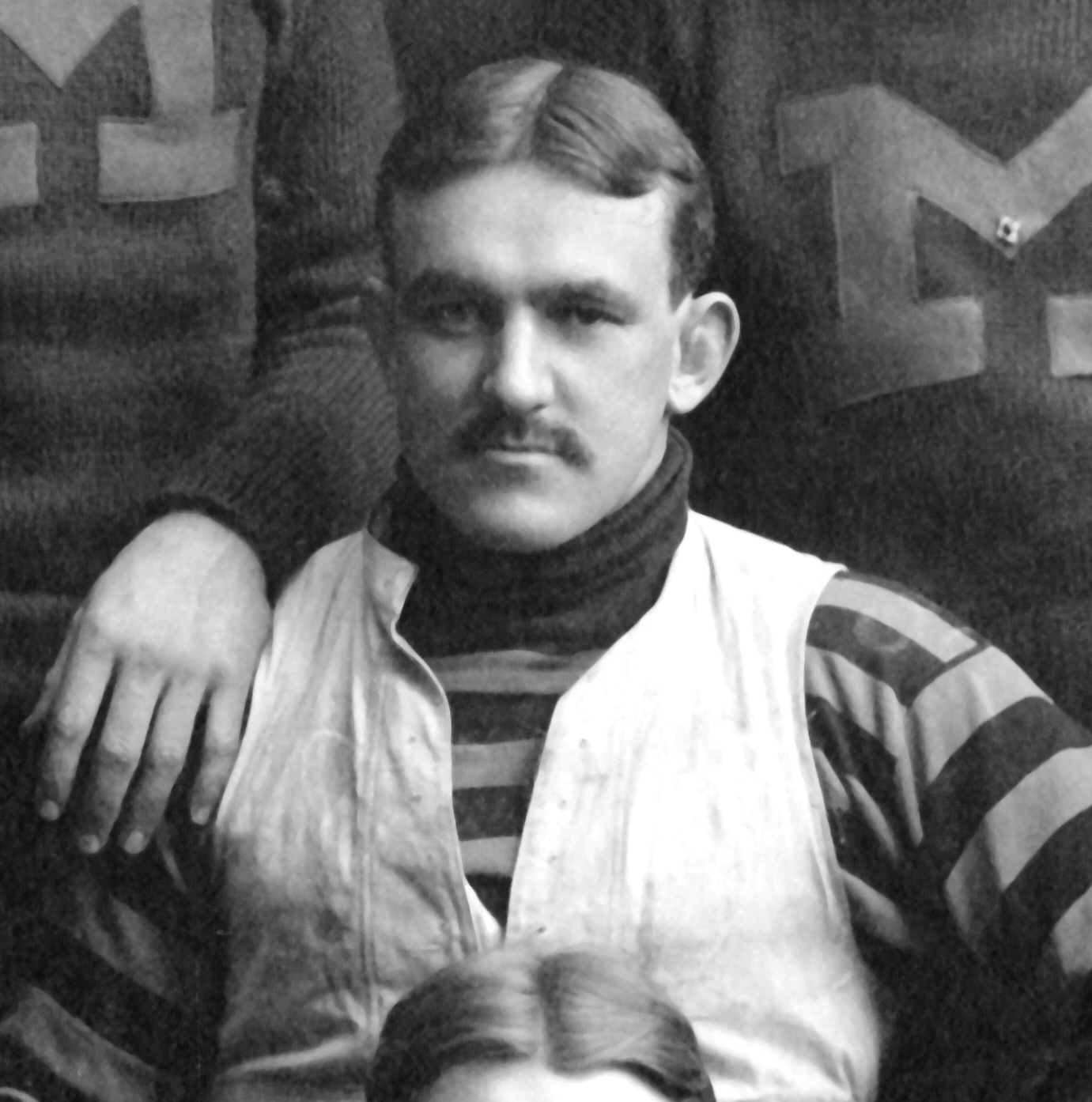
Allen Steckle later gained fame as the coach of the University of Nevada football team.

On November 5, 1898, Michigan opened its Western Conference schedule by playing Northwestern. The game was played in front of a small crowd at Evanston, Illinois, with Michigan fans seated in newly built stands on the east side of the field. The Northwestern fans were seated on the west side of the field and were led by two bands.

Michigan won a close game by a score of 6 to 5. On Northwestern's second drive, Bothne carried the ball 40 yards to Michigan's ten-yard line. Bothne eventually carried the ball across the goal line to give Northwestern a 5–0 lead. Northwestern's extra point kick attempt was made into a strong wind and sailed one foot wide of the crossbar. Coach Bannard of Northwestern argued that Northwestern should have been granted another attempt at the extra point and blamed the referee for the defeat. The Chicago Daily Tribune wrote: "Referee Brown refused to permit a second try, although Michigan was off side." The Tribune blamed the officials for regularly allowing Michigan to line up off side: "Brown, the pudgy Michigan center, was over the line half of the time before Little could get the ball started, and through that hole, during the second half, a man named Weeks plunged with disastrous regularity."

On offense, Michigan drove 60 yards for a touchdown on its next drive after Northwestern scored. Charles Widman began the drive with a 30-yard gain. When the ball was pushed close to Northwestern's goal line, William Caley carried the ball and was "dragged over the line." Neil Snow kicked the extra point that proved to be Michigan's margin of victory. Alanson Weeks was credited with "brilliant" work and big gains, while Allen Steckle was described as the star of the game with his "smashing plunges." Michigan reportedly made frequent use of "a mass play on tackle."

The Wolverines drove the ball to Northwestern's five-yard-line on four drives but failed to score a touchdown, having one drive halted by a holding penalty and three others stopped on downs. The Chicago Daily Tribune described Northwestern's goal-line stands as follows:

"Many times the Michiganders raised the song of victory as the ball was forced under the shadows of the Northwestern posts, but before the chorus had died away the grim men in purple, fighting frantically to defend the goal, drove back the invaders and punted out of danger. Then the fierce battering would begin again, Michigan would hurl its weight of muscle and sinew against the crumbling line of purple, and inch by inch the ball would travel back toward the final line; again the chant of victory would rise from the Wolverines only to die away in disappointment, while wild yells poured down under the fluttering ribbons of the Evanston supporters."

As time ran out, Michigan fielded a Northwestern kick. In what the Tribune called an "exciting mixup," players and trainers from each team then rushed for the ball. "The gang mixed up in lively style, and for a minute fists smashed all through the crowd. The police rushed in and the disturbance was instantly quelled, but eventually Michigan secured the ball and carried it off as a prize to its trophy-room."

The game was played in 35-minute halves. Michigan's starting lineup against Northwestern was Bennett (left end), White (left tackle), Caley (left guard), Cunningham (center),France (right guard), Steckle (right tackle), Snow (right end), Street (quarterback), Widman (left halfback), Barabee (right halfback), and McDonald (fullback). Players appearing in the game as substitutes for Michigan were Avery (left tackle) and Weeks (fullback).

=== Vs. Illinois ===
Illinois vs. Michigan

Team	1	2	Total
Illinois	5	0	5
• Michigan	6	6	12

- Date: November 12, 1898
- Location: Detroit Athletic Club Grounds, Detroit, Michigan
- Game start: 3:00 p.m.
- Game attendance: 3,500
- Referee: Frank Carter (Detroit)

Michigan's second conference game was a 12 to 5 win over Illinois at Detroit. The game was played after heavy rains had turned the field at the Detroit Athletic Club into "a veritable sea of mud." Michigan won the game in front of a crowd of 3,500 spectators. After five minutes of play, "the men were plastered with mud," and the wet field contributed to poor footing and difficulties handling the ball. The Wolverines won despite what one writer described as "ragged play" that included a number of penalties for offsides and "keeping of hands." Clifford Barabee scored Michigan's first touchdown as he was shoved into the endzone by his teammates. Illinois' only score came in the first half after Michigan's fullback, Alanson Weeks, fumbled, and Illinois player picked it up and ran 50 yards for a touchdown. Michigan completed the scoring in the second half with a touchdown drive that included runs of 10 and 15 yards by John McLean and additional gains by Neil Snow, Charles Widman and Allen Steckle. Widman scored the touchdown on an end run. Right end John Bennett successfully completed both of his point after touchdown kicks for the Wolverines.

The game was played in 35-minute halves. Michigan's starting lineup against Illinois was Bennett (left end), White (left tackle), Caley (left guard), Cunningham (center), Baker (right guard), Steckle (right tackle), Snow (right end), Talcott (quarterback), Widman (left halfback), Barabee (right halfback), and Weeks (fullback). Players appearing in the game as substitutes for Michigan were Avery (left tackle), Whitcomb (fullback), Allen (left guard), Kramer (right guard), Teetzel (left halfback), and Hicks (right end).

=== Beloit ===
Beloit at Michigan

Team	1	2	Total
Beloit	0	0	0
• Michigan	16	6	22

- Date: November 19, 1898
- Location: Regents Field • Ann Arbor, Michigan
- Referee: Fred Hayner (Lake Forest)

On November 19, 1898, Michigan defeated the team from Beloit College, 22–0. Michigan's 22 points exceeded the totals compiled against Beloit by both Chicago (21 points) and Wisconsin (17 points). McLean returned the opening kickoff 55 yards, but the first half turned into a punting duel. William Caley moved from his position on the line at guard to the backfield as fullback. Because of Caley's strong punting (40 to 55 yards per attempt), Michigan gained 15 to 20 yards on the exchange of punts. The Chicago Daily Tribune wrote that Caley's "punting was faultless, and his line bucking set the crowd wild." Michigan scored three touchdowns in the first half and one in the second half. Michigan's touchdowns were scored by Charles Widman (2), Allen Steckle, and Caley. Neil Snow kicked two extra points. Widman scored the first touchdown after nine minutes of play, and Snow kicked the extra point. The second touchdown was set up by a 50-yard run by Snow, followed by a touchdown run by Widman.

On defense, Michigan held Beloit scoreless, and Caley was credited with his work in backing up the line. The Chicago Daily Tribune wrote that the Wolverines "played by far the swiftest and best game of the year." With one of Chicago's coaches (Gale) and its captain (Kennedy) in attendance at the game, the Wolverines played "straight football" with the exception of "a delayed pass and ordinary criss-cross." Fred Hayner, who served as the referee, opined, "Michigan plays three times as fast a game as she did against Northwestern. She also played a cleaner game as far as holding and getting offside too."

The game was played in 20-minute halves. Michigan's starting lineup against Beloit was Bennett (left end), White (left tackle), Baker (left guard), Cunningham (center), France (right guard), Steckle (right tackle), Snow (right end), Street (quarterback), Widman (left halfback), McLean (right halfback), and Caley (fullback). Players appearing in the game as substitutes for Michigan were Avery (left tackle), Brown (center), Talcott (quarterback), and Whitcomb (right halfback). The referee was Fred Hayner from Lake Forest.

=== At Chicago ===
Michigan at Chicago

Team	1	2	Total
• Michigan	6	6	12
Chicago	5	6	11

- Date: November 24, 1898
- Location: Marshall Field, Chicago, IL
- Game start: 1:30 p.m.
- Game attendance: 12,000
- Referee: Fred Hayner (Lake Forest)

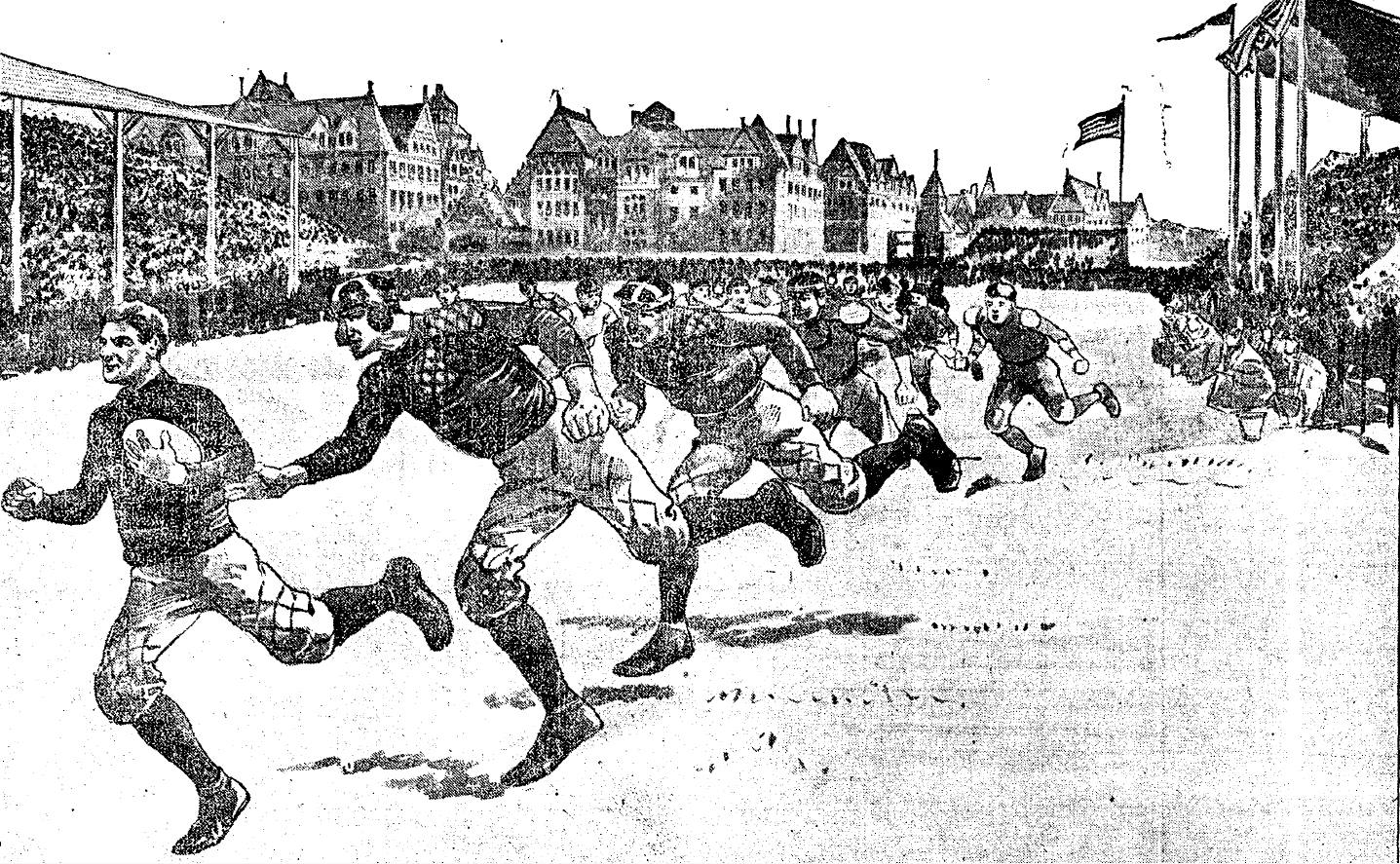
"Widman of Michigan, Pursued by Chicago Players, Runs for Glory and a Touchdown"

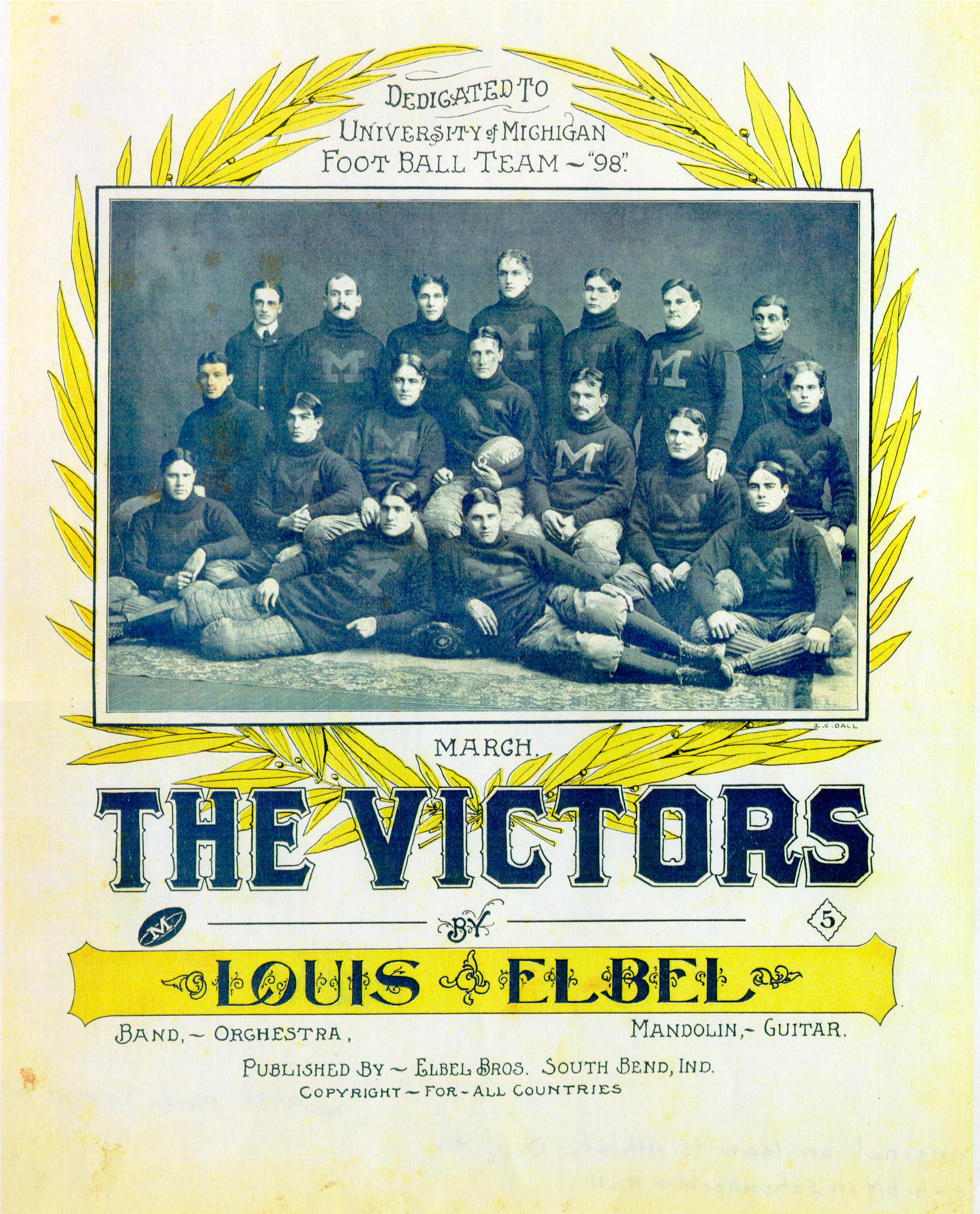
Louis Elbel composed Michigan's fight song "The Victors" (original sheet music pictured) as a tribute to the 1898 football team.

Michigan concluded its undefeated season on Thanksgiving Day with a 12–11 victory over the Chicago Maroons at Marshall Field. The game was played for the championship of the Western Conference. In order to accommodate the crowd of Michigan fans traveling to Chicago for the game, the Michigan Central Railroad arranged for two special trains to run from Ann Arbor to Chicago at a round trip price of five dollars. The special excursion tickets allowed fans to spend the weekend in Chicago and return on Monday.

A crowd of 12,000 spectators attended the game. The New York Times wrote: "The day and the grounds were ideal for football. The thermometer was lingering around the freezing mark, but the sky was cloudless, and the northwest wind was too light to interfere with the placing of punts." The Chicago team was favored and was reported to be "the heaviest that ever represented a college, the average weight of the men being over 190 pounds."

Michigan's first score came after 25 minutes of play on a run by Charles Widman from the five-yard line. Widman was shoved over the goal line for a touchdown, and Neil Snow kicked the extra point to give Michigan a 6 to 0 lead. Later in the half, Chicago drove the ball to Michigan's 30-yard-line, and the Maroons' All-American Clarence Herschberger kicked a field goal from placement to cut Michigan's lead to 6 to 5. (Field goals were counted as five points.)

Early in the second half, Michigan scored its second touchdown and converted the extra point to take a 12–5 lead. Widman ran 65 yards for the touchdown on a "delayed pass" on the most exciting play of the game. The Chicago Daily Tribune described Widman's run:

"Widman scurried out of the back of the mass of players with the ball under his arm and down the field with nothing in sight ahead of him except the goal posts. All the fast men of the Chicago team went in fast pursuit. It was a beautiful race down the field. Three Chicago men were close behind. But the blue-legged runner gained almost imperceptibly at times, and then barely held his own. He could run as fast as his pursuers, and with his start was safe. If one or two of those Chicago players had made a dive for him perhaps he might have been stopped. One of them did try up near the goal, but missed him, tripping him slightly, but he rolled over the line. Michigan had another touchdown and the game, and the Western championship in its pocket."

Widman described the run after the game as follows:

"The play was a revolving wedge on Chicago's left tackle. Their end and tackle had been drawn in by our men, and when the ball was given to me on a delayed pass I had a clear field, except for Chicago's backs. I ran as fast as I could diagonally across the field, realizing that I was hotly pursued. At last I was tackled on what I afterwards learned was about the six-yard line. I was slightly dazed by the fall, but saw a goal post ahead of me and managed to crawl over the line. I did not know I had made a touchdown, however, until Captain Bennett told me."

Snow added his second extra point kick to give Michigan a 12–5 lead. Chicago responded with a touchdown run by its left guard, Burnett, and the extra point reduced Michigan's lead to a single point. Michigan forced Chicago to punt on its final possession, and the Wolverines became champions of the Western Conference for the first time in the school's history.

One newspaper noted: "Michigan, with the exception of one or two double passes, relied almost altogether on straight football, line bucking and runs around the end. Chicago, on the contrary, used trick plays throughout but the team work was of a high order, as shown by both teams." After the game, Michigan's team captain, J.W.F. Bennett, told reporters: "Widman's sensational run was the feature of the game, but every player deserves the victory. We must thank Keene Fitzpatrick for our splendid condition." Chicago coach Amos Alonzo Stagg said: "It was perhaps the finest game of football ever played in the West. It certainly was spectacular and full of features."

The game was played in 35-minute halves. Michigan's starting lineup against Chicago was Snow (right end), Steckle (right tackle), Baker (right guard), Cunningham (center), France (left guard), White (left tackle), Bennett (left end), Street (quarterback), McLean (right halfback), Widman (left halfback), and Caley (fullback).

=== Championship celebration ===
During the Chicago game, 1,000 students gathered at the Athens Theater in Ann Arbor where they listened to a play-by-play account of the game as it was transmitted by telegraph from Chicago. Michigan gains were met with cheering. When Widman's touchdown run was announced, "It seemed as if the whole assembly was thrown into the air by a volcanic eruption. Men threw their hats and coats at one another and hugged and danced in the aisles for fully ten minutes." After the game, the crowd marched through the streets to President James B. Angell's home. President Angell greeted the crowd with a broad smile and said, "I congratulate you on the success of the Michigan team in Chicago this afternoon. It is a great victory, and we owe much to the men who have won the laurels of our victory from the brow of our sister institution of learning. It has been said that I am opposed to the game, but I wish to say that I, too, used to play in college. In those days, however, we played the Herschberger game, and used to kick the ball instead of the man. It is a great termination of the fall campaign, and we are greatly indebted to those who have so actively participated in it."

In Chicago, more than 1,000 Michigan fans paraded in a line through the University of Chicago campus behind the Michigan band singing Michigan songs and cheers. The parade ended at the Hotel Del Prado, where several Michigan players and alumni delivered speeches. On the Monday evening following the victory in Chicago, the team was welcomed back to Ann Arbor with a "rousing celebration." More than 2,000 students gathered around a huge bonfire, singing and cheering "until nearly midnight." It was reported that the Michigan students turned out with more enthusiasm than had been shown in Ann Arbor since the 1895 football team returned from a game against Harvard.

=== Post-season honors ===
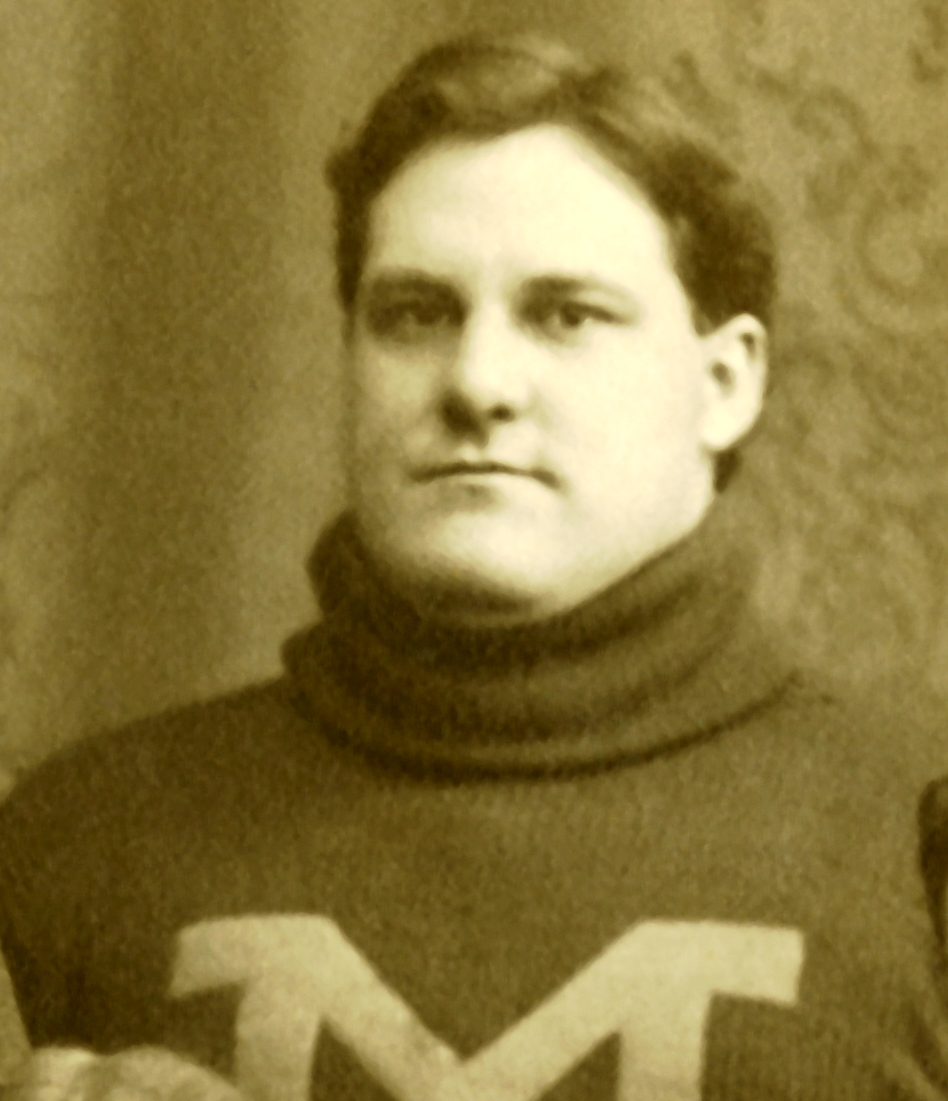
Center William Cunningham became Michigan's first All-American in 1898.

Michigan's first Western Conference championship attracted the attention of the eastern football experts who selected the All-American teams. Based on the performance of Michigan's center, William Cunningham, in the Chicago game, Amos Alonzo Stagg recommended Cunningham as an All-American. In Harper's Weekly, Caspar Whitney, who originated the practice of selecting All-American teams in 1889, chose Cunningham for his first-team All-American eleven. Cunningham was the first Michigan football player to be so honored. His selection also "broke the unwritten tradition that All-Americans had to come from Yale, Harvard, Princeton or a few other Eastern schools." Whitney also named Charles Widman and John McLean as substitutes on his All-American team. Cunningham and Allen Steckle also received second-team All-American honors from Walter Camp in Collier's Weekly.

Whitney also named five Michigan players to his All-Western team: Caley at halfback, Cunningham at center, Steckle at tackle, and Snow and Bennett at the ends. He named Widman and McLean as substitutes on his All-Western team.

=== Inspiration for "The Victors" ===
After watching Michigan's 12–11 victory over Chicago in 1898, Louis Elbel, who was at the time a student in the University of Michigan School of Music, was inspired to write "The Victors", which was later adopted as Michigan's fight song. He reportedly began composing the song at his sister's house in the Englewood section of Chicago and continued the effort on the return train ride from Chicago to Ann Arbor. Elbel's lyric, "Champions of the West", refers to Michigan's having won the Western Conference championship for the first time in the school's history. Elbel later recalled:

"We were crazed with joy. We paraded in the dark. We yelled and followed our U-M Band, singing to the tune of 'Hot Time in the Old Town.' It struck me quite suddenly that such an epic should be dignified by something more elevating, for this was not ordinary victory. My spirits were so uplifted that I was clear off the earth, and that is when 'The Victors' was inspired. I put in a lot of 'hails' and I knew the fellows would get them in with the proper emphasis. Through them, the title suggested itself, and I dedicated it to the Michigan team of 1898."

== Players ==
=== Varsity letter winners ===
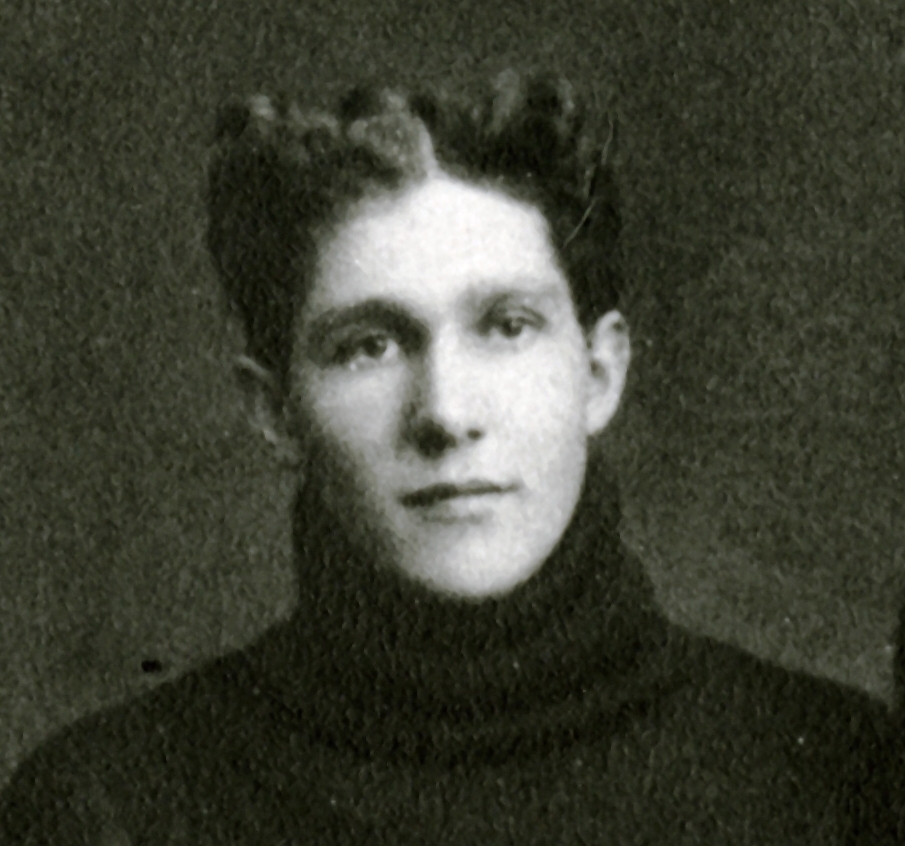
John McClean also set records for Michigan's track team in the 120-yard hurdles and broad jump.

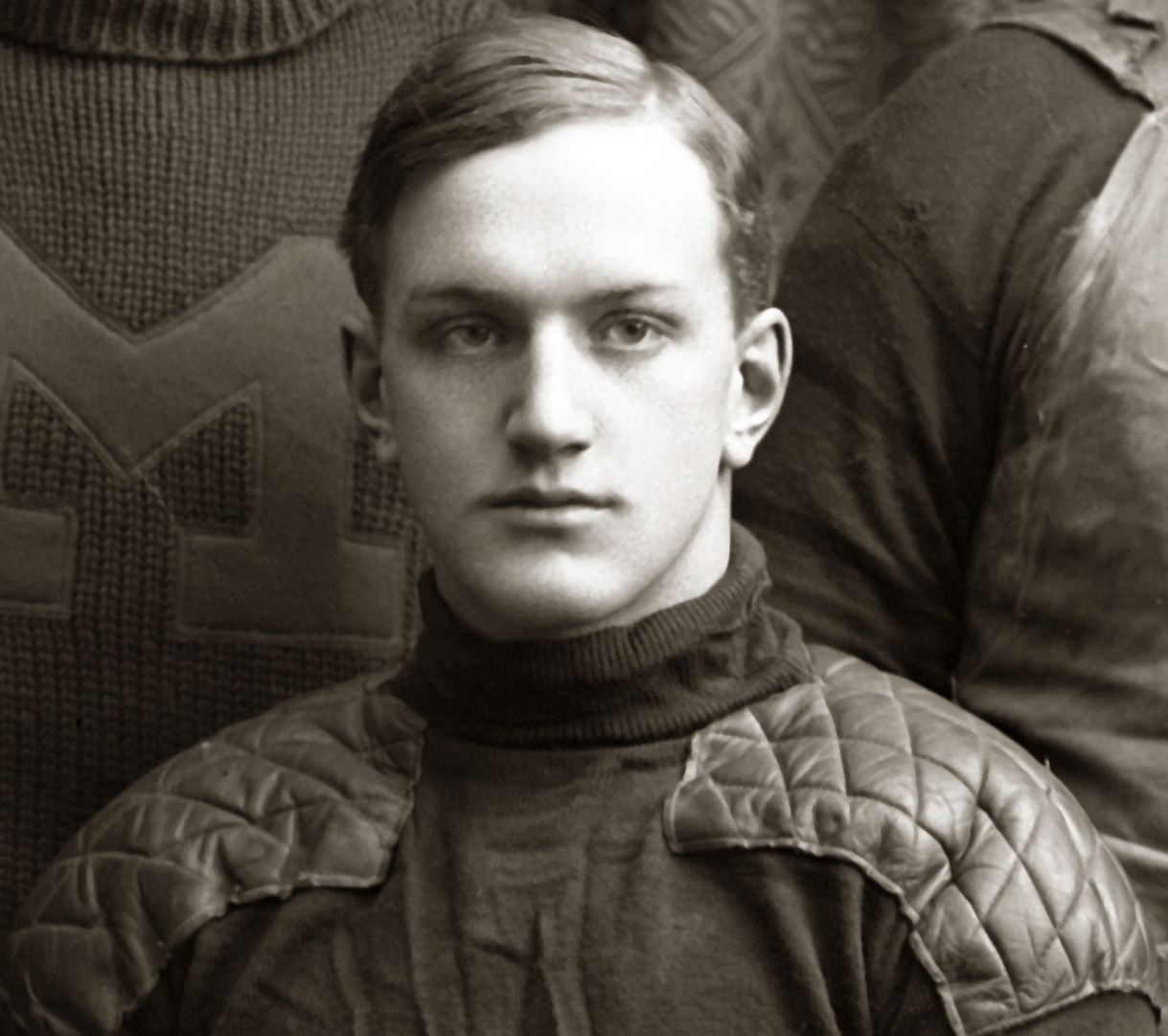
End Neil Snow was a star of the 1901 "point-a-minute" team and is a member of the College Football Hall of Fame.

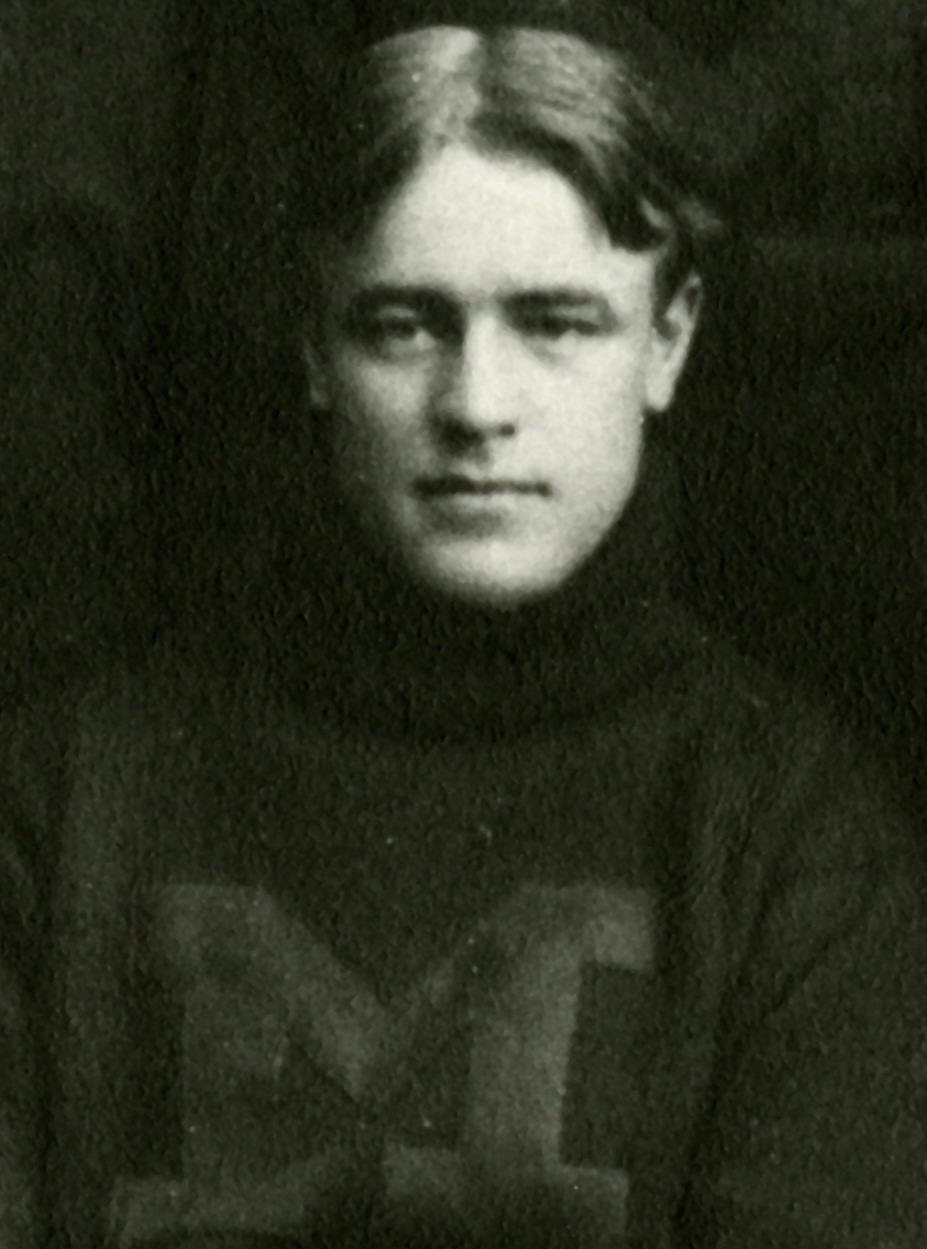
Guard William Caley was the second leading scorer on the 1898 team.

The following 17 players received varsity "M" letters for their participation on the 1898 football team:

- Waldo A. Avery, Jr. - started 2 games (Michigan Normal and Kenyon) at left halfback
- Clifford Barabee - started 3 games at left halfback, 2 games at right halfback, 1 game at quarterback, 1 game at fullback
- William P. Baker - started 3 games at left guard
- John W. F. Bennett - started 5 games at left end, 1 game at right end
- William Caley - started 6 games at left guard, 2 games at fullback, 1 game at right guard
- William Cunningham - started 4 games at center
- Richard France - started 8 games at right guard, 1 game at left guard
- Charles G. McDonald - started 1 game at right tackle, 1 game at fullback
- John McLean - started 2 games at right halfback
- Neil Snow - started 8 games at right end, 2 games at left end
- Allen Steckle - started 9 games at right tackle
- Charles E. Street - started 3 games at quarterback
- William Wilson Talcott - started 6 games at quarterback
- Alanson Weeks - started 3 games at fullback
- Hugh White - started 6 at left tackle
- Charles Widman - started 5 games at left halfback, 3 games at right halfback

=== Reserves ===
- William Luedson Allen - guard
- George E. Baldwin - halfback
- Guy D. Blencoe - halfback
- Harry R. Brown - started 3 games at center
- Homer Stephen Carr - started 1 game at center
- William Louis Day - started 1 game at left tackle
- Robert Dye - started 1 game at center
- Arthur Ganschow - end
- Frederic C. Hannan - started 1 game at fullback
- Ralph Hicks - end
- Ned Y. Howell - tackle
- Rutherford B. H. Kramer - started 1 game at right guard
- Lewis Larson - tackle
- Lewis Larson - tackle
- Carl F. Mohr - halfback
- August Henry Oversmith - guard
- Ard E. Richardson - end
- Clayton Teetzel - started 3 games at left end, 1 game at right end
- Harry Scott Vernon - halfback
- George Whitcomb - started 3 games at right halfback

=== Others ===
- Fred William Hartsburg - quarterback
- Leo J. Keena - started 2 games at fullback
- Smith - started 1 game at center
- W. J. Wood - started 3 games at left tackle

=== Scoring leaders ===
The following scoring totals include the 11 points scored in the homecoming game against the alumni.

Player	Touchdowns	Extra points	Field goals	Points
Charles Widman	12	0	0	60
William Caley	5	0	0	25
Neil Snow	2	12	0	22
Clifford Barabee	4	0	0	20
Allen Steckle	4	0	0	20
Leo J. Keena	1	8	1	18
George Whitcomb	3	0	0	15
Waldo Avery	2	0	0	10
Clayton Teetzel	1	2	0	7
Guy Blencoe	1	0	0	5
William Louis Day	1	0	0	5
Fred William Hartsburg	1	0	0	5
John W. F. Bennett	0	2	0	2
Charles E. Street	0	2	0	2
TOTALS	37	26	2	216

== Awards and honors ==
- Captain: John W. F. Bennett
- All-Americans: William Cunningham (Caspar Whitney's first team, Walter Camp's second team), Allen Steckle (Walter Camp's second team), Charles Widman (Whitney substitute), John McLean (Whitney substitute), Charles E. Street (Leslie's Weekly second team)
- All-Western: William Caley (Whitney), William Cunningham (Whitney), Allen Steckle (Whitney), Neil Snow (Whitney), and John W. F. Bennett (Whitney), Charles Widman (Whitney substitute), John McLean (Whitney substitute)

== Coaching staff ==
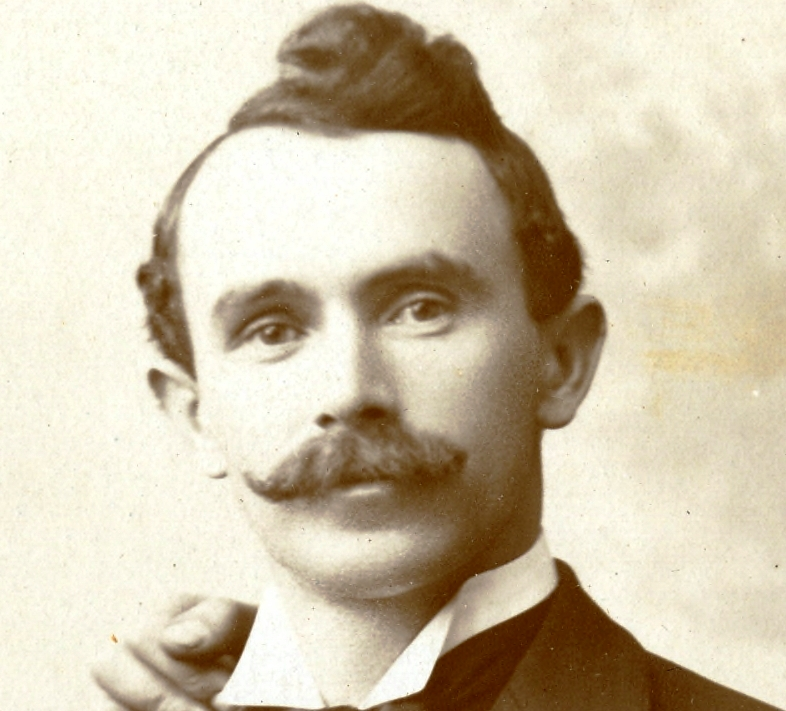
Trainer and track coach Keene Fitzpatrick is considered "one of the pioneers of intercollegiate sport."

- Head coach: Gustave Ferbert
- Assistant coaches: James Baird, John R. Duffy, Forrest M. Hall, Frederick W. Henninger, William C. Malley, and Giovanni R. Villa
- Trainer: Keene Fitzpatrick
- Managers: Harry B. Potter and F.W. Potter
