= William Wilson Talcott =

American publisher and football player

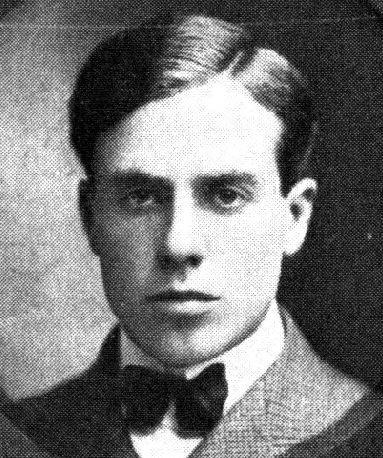
- William Wilson Talcott, 1901
- Born: December 4, 1878; Valparaiso, Indiana, US
- Died: August 24, 1922 (aged 43); Chicago, Illinois, US
- Body discovered: August 30, 1922
- Education: University of Michigan
- Known for: Football player, teacher, newspaper publisher, manufacturer
- Spouse: Shirley J. Patterson (m. 1904)
- Children: 1

William Wilson Talcott (December 4, 1878 – August 24, 1922) was an American football player, school teacher, newspaper publisher, and ice cream manufacturer.

Talcott played college football for the University of Michigan in 1897 and 1898 and was the starting quarterback for the undefeated 1898 Michigan Wolverines football team. After graduating from Michigan, he worked as a school teacher in Illinois and Michigan.

He entered the newspaper publishing business in 1905 and published The Englewood Economist from September 1906 to January 1918. From 1918 to 1920, he was the business manager of the Paris edition of the Chicago Tribune. He later went into the ice cream business in Chicago.

In August 1922, Talcott led a legal battle with the head of a so-called "love cult" with which his wife had become involved. The legal battle received national newspaper coverage. When his wife refused to part ways with the cult, Talcott committed suicide by jumping from an excursion boat off the shore of Chicago with rocks in his pockets.

== Early years ==
Talcott was born in December 1878 in Valparaiso, Indiana. He was the second of five children of Charles Ransom Talcott and Harriet E. Malone, who were married in October 1873. His father was a native of Valparaiso who began his career as a school teacher. From 1874 to 1886, his father was the publisher of the Porter County Vidette, a local newspaper in Valparaiso.

In August 1886, when Talcott was seven years old, the family moved to Chicago where his father worked for many years at the Western Publishing House. After the family's move to Chicago, Talcott grew up in the Englewood neighborhood on Chicago's South Side. He attended the public schools in Englewood and graduated from Englewood High School.

As a senior in the fall of 1896, Talcott was captain and quarterback of the Englewood High School football team. In September 1896, the Chicago Tribune wrote: "Englewood has always come into the field with a team of strong and heavy men. This year's team will be no exception to the rule ... Talcott, quarter back, is Captain, and he has all of last year's line men to work with." The 1896 Englewood team, led by Talcott and end Clayton Teetzel, won the Cook County football championship. The season ended with a 38–6 victory over Hyde Park, which was described in the Englewood High School newspaper as follows: "The final game with Hyde Park ... was the greatest of all. To defeat our ancient rivals was the happiest ambition of the team. The defeat of '95 still rankles in the breasts of seven of the team, and they were determined to do or die. 'It was a glorious victory,' the score being 38 to 6, when time was called because of darkness with ten minutes yet to play."

== University of Michigan ==
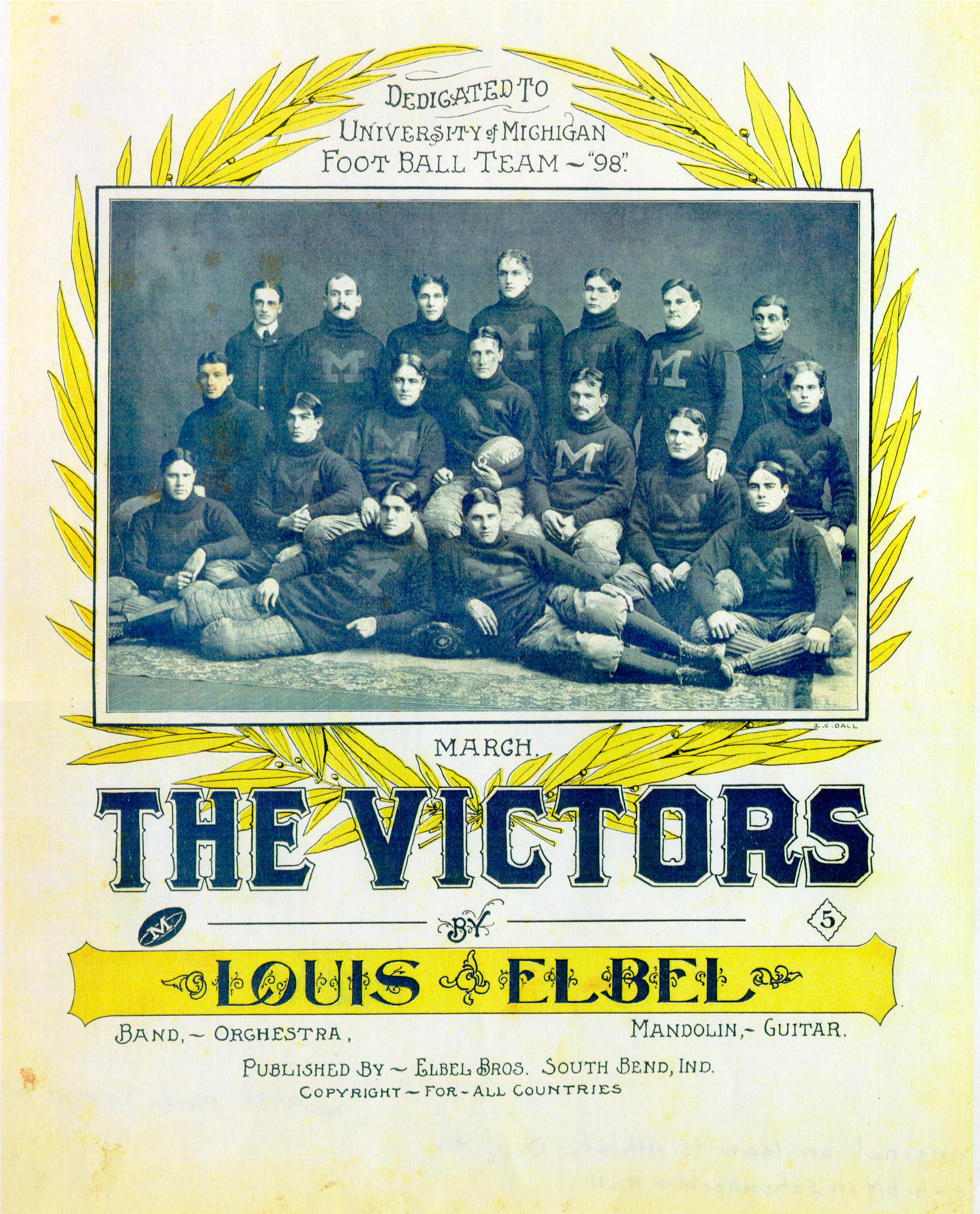
Louis Elbel composed Michigan's fight song "The Victors" as a tribute to the 1898 football team (pictured with original sheet).

In the fall of 1897, Talcott and his Englewood teammate Clayton Teetzel enrolled at the University of Michigan as students in the Literary Department. During Talcott's freshman year, he played as a backup quarterback for the 1897 Michigan Wolverines football team. He also joined the Theta Delta Chi fraternity in 1897. In its annual publication, The Shield, the fraternity reported that the Michigan chapter was "proud" in having Talcott play "quarter in a number of the games."

As a sophomore, Talcott was the starting quarterback in six of ten games for the undefeated 1898 Michigan football team that won the school's first Western Conference (as the Big Ten was then known) championship and prompted Louis Elbel to compose Michigan's fight song, "The Victors." In the early days of football, players were required to play on both offense and defense. On defense, Talcott was a linebacker. Blocking was known at the time as "interference," and after a 23–0 victory over Notre Dame in October 1898, The Michigan Alumnus wrote that "Talcott shone in the interference."

During his junior year, Talcott did not return to the varsity football team, and was instead the captain of the junior class football team. As a senior in the fall of 1900, Talcott was an assistant coach under Langdon Lea for Michigan's varsity football team, "winning quite a reputation for himself in that line." Talcott also served as the Chairman of the Senior Literary Social Committee. He graduated with his bachelor's degree in 1901.

== Teaching ==
After graduating from Michigan, Talcott became a school teacher. In 1902, he was a teacher at a school in Chicago. In early 1904, Talcott wrote a letter to the secretary of his graduating class at Michigan, informing his former classmates that he was the principal of the high school in Bessemer, Michigan. In his letter, Talcott noted that he had "fully decided to make teaching his life work" and "expressed his belief that participation in athletics and other activities of student life, as supplementary to the work of class-room, and library, and laboratory, might form a very valuable part of the preparation of the teacher, in giving self-control, confidence, and knowledge of human nature."

On August 24, 1904, Talcott married Shirley J. Patterson, at Jackson, Michigan. They listed their address at the time as Hurley, Wisconsin, a city located a short distance across the border from Bessemer, Michigan.

== Newspaper publishing ==
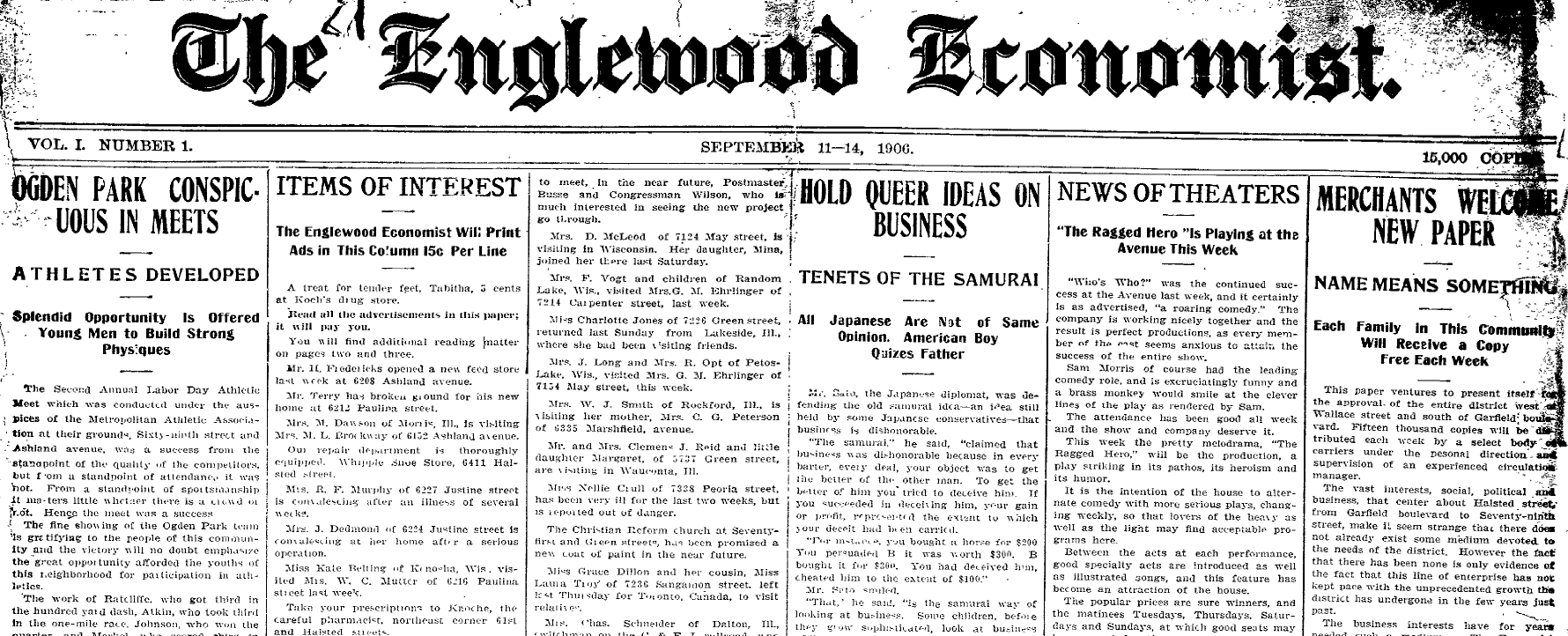
First issue of The Englewood Economist

In approximately 1905, Talcott followed his father into the newspaper publishing business. He began his publishing career with the Englewood News, serving the Englewood section of Chicago. In September 1906, Talcott and his younger brother, James Richard Talcott, founded The Englewood Economist, a weekly newspaper serving the Englewood community. The first edition was four pages and included the following statement of goals:

This paper ventures to present itself for the approval of the entire district west of Wallace street and south of Garfield Boulevard. Fifteen thousand copies will be distributed each week by a select body of carriers ... The business interests have for years needed such a medium as The Economist will be, as is shown by the readiness with which many concerns, both large and small, have entered into the plan. Besides giving space to important local items The Englewood Economist will, each issue, contain short articles on interesting incidents of the day, occasionally a short story, and always bits of wit and humor. In a word it will be the aim of the paper to afford this rapidly growing section a means of self-expression and cause people to await its delivery anxiously ...

The paper's circulation grew to 138,750 by 1922. Though its name was later changed to the Southtown Economist, the newspaper founded by the Talcott brothers was still publishing 100 years later.

By 1912, James Talcott had left The Englewood Economist and moved to Kansas City, Missouri. In 1918, Talcott sold the newspaper to Foster & McDonnell, who published the Auburn Park Community Booster and the West Englewood Telegram.

In August 1918, Talcott moved to Paris, France, as the business manager of the Paris edition of the Chicago Tribune. At the time of his departure, the new owners of The Englewood Economist wrote, "By training and experience Mr. Talcott is exceptionally well fitted for the duties he is about to assume and he leaves with the felicitations for success of a host of friends and acquaintances throughout Chicago." He was joined in Paris by his family in the summer of 1919 and returned to Chicago in March 1920. Talcott and his wife had three children.

In late February 1920, he wrote in a postcard to The Englewood Economist: "We are spending a few days in Switzerland, Southern France and Italy before sailing March 6th from Naples. Will see you before April 1st. Give my best to all the folks." After returning from Europe, Talcott published editorials in The Englewood Economist strongly supporting approval for the League of Nations.

== Ice cream business ==
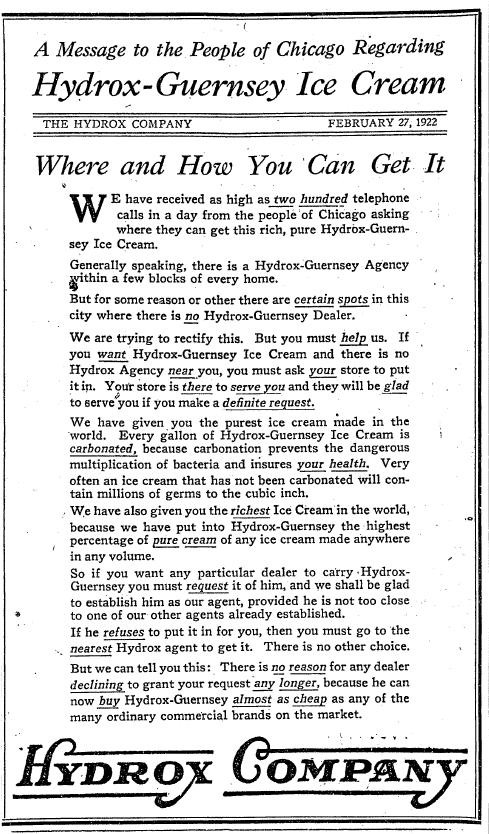
February 1922 advertisement for Hydrox-Guernsey Ice Cream

By 1922, Talcott had left the newspaper business and was working for The Hydrox Company, the largest ice cream company in Chicago. He was described in some sources as "head of the city's largest ice-cream manufacturing concern," but he described himself in February 1922 as the company's advertising manager. He wrote an article that was published in The Soda Fountain in February 1922 urging ice cream manufacturers and vendors to adopt a sales campaign to promote winter sales of their products as an aid to good health. Talcott wrote that "the combined ice cream interests of the country should be able in the same way to get the people, men, women and children to stand on the corners and eat ice cream in a snowstorm for the sake of improved health, increased vitality, and strengthened constitution obtainable from eating plenty of the delicious product." Talcott went so far as to proffer several potential slogans for use in promoting winter sales. Talcott's slogans included the following:

HARDEN YOURSELF TO ENDURE COLD -- EAT PLENTY OF ICE CREAM
ICE CREAM IS A GREAT HARDENER -- EAT IT OFTEN ALL WINTER
ICE CREAM FOR LUNCH ON SCHOOL DAYS WILL ENABLE YOUR CHILDREN TO ENJOY THESE RUGGED, WINTRY DAYS
FIGHT COLD WITH COLD -- EAT ICE CREAM
THE BLASTS OF WINTER HAVE LITTLE EFFECT ON CHILDREN THAT EAT ICE CREAM

== Legal fight with "love cult" and suicide ==
=== Wife's involvement with the "House of Happiness" ===
In August 1922, Talcott became involved in publicized legal proceedings against Albert J. Moore, the leader of the "Life Institute" or "House of Happiness", which was described in the press as a "love cult." Moore operated the Life Institute out of a "temple" at 162 East Ontario Street in Chicago. Moore sent delegations from his temple to the homes of wealthy Chicago society women to perform incantations that were said to render the homes "divorce proof." Moore also gave lectures on titles that included, "The Origin of Sex" and "Healing the Sick Through Sex Understanding."

Talcott's wife, Shirley, fell in with Moore and admitted to having given him $7,000. Hattie Cartwright, wife of Illinois Supreme Court Justice James H. Cartwright, admitted giving Moore $4,000. Mrs. Talcott's sister, Mrs. Dedo Patterson Wilkinson, wrote a letter to Talcott begging him to "do everything possible to get his wife out of 'control' of 'Dr.' Moore." The letter from Mrs. Talcott's sister continued, "I talked to Moore and tried to make him let up; only he wouldn't. Something must be done with him for she [Mrs. Talcott] is not responsible, but I am not susceptible." Mrs. Talcott's sister urged Talcott to have her put in a sanitarium, if needed, to win her back from Moore. Talcott's brother later recalled, "My brother was undoubtedly despondent. He recently brooded incessantly over domestic troubles. He worried as no man ever worried before."

=== Criminal complaint against Moore ===
When his wife refused to cease her association with Moore, Talcott resorted to legal proceedings. In mid-August 1922, Talcott, acting in the name of his wife, swore out a complaint against Moore, charging that Moore was deceiving wealthy women from the "best homes" in Chicago into turning over thousands of dollars to "heal their homes" and make them "divorce proof." Moore was brought into police court to face the charges on August 17, 1922. At the hearing, he produced typewritten testimonials bearing the names of "the city's most prominent families." Mrs. Talcott also appeared at the hearing and told newspaper reporters that she did not approve of her husband's action and felt that he "shouldn't prosecute Moore." The judge set the matter for an evidentiary hearing on August 22, 1922.

Talcott's complaint against the leader of a "love cult" drew coverage in newspapers across the country, with Talcott billed as the "nemesis of the love cult," and the "leader of the famous 'husband's rebellion.'" At the resumed hearing on August 22, Judge John Henderson heard testimony from several witnesses. Hattie Cartwright testified that Moore was a fake healer, noting that he claimed to be "greater than Christ" and to have the ability to raise the dead, yet he "couldn't raise hair on his own bald spot." Another witness testified that his wife referred to Moore as "my master." Mrs. Talcott's sister testified as to the hold Moore held over her sister:

Mrs. Talcott and Mr. Moore and I went to lunch at the Hamilton club. He informed me it was only a courtesy when people talked to you to look them in the eyes. I said to myself right then, 'hypnotism.' My sister sat as a broken flower. I'll never forget how she looked.

At the end of the day's hearing, Judge Richardson fined Moore $100 and court costs. Moore said he would appeal the ruling and told his disciples at the Chicago Avenue police station that he would hold services as usual that evening. City Attorney, Louis P. Piquette, threatened to close all meetings at Moore's temple. That evening, 50 of Moore's followers gathered at his temple, where they conducted ceremonies "as usual, without molestation" from the police or City Attorney.

=== Commitment proceedings against wife ===
Following Moore's trial on August 22, Talcott had his wife committed temporarily to a "psychopathic hospital" for mental examination due to "her decision to cleave to the 'House of Happiness.'" Talcott declared to police that he believed his wife's mind had been affected by an infatuation for Moore's teachings. Her incarceration was brief, as physicians declared her sane. She was released on August 24.

=== Talcott's suicide ===
On the morning of August 24, Talcott was reportedly despondent and disappeared. That afternoon, a well-dressed man matching Talcott's appearance, climbed to the upper deck of a small excursion steamer, the "Favorite," and jumped from the railing as it travelled from Lincoln Park to the Navy Pier. Police recovered a straw hat left by the jumper and took the hat to the Talcott home. The police showed the hat to Mrs. Talcott, who had just reached the Talcott residence at 637 East Marquette Road, after her release from the hospital. Mrs. Talcott told the police that she could not identify the hat as her husband's property. Talcott's seven-year-old son, Byron Talcott, said "he was certain the hat was not his father's, as it had too narrow a band." That night, life and coast guards were stationed on the lakeshore with searchlights in case the body washed ashore during the night.

Two days after Talcott's disappearance, a haberdasher from the South Side identified the straw hat as a Portis Brothers hat that he had sold to Talcott two months earlier. The haberdasher's story was corroborated when he produced a second, identical hat which was still in his stock. After two days, the coast guard commander ceased efforts to retrieve the body. He noted that the water was too deep at the point "where the death leap occurred," but added that the water conditions would bring the body to the surface within a few days.

On August 30, Talcott's body was found floating in Lake Michigan near Van Buren Street. Mrs. Talcott was escorted into the city morgue through a back door. She "calmly identified the body, and departed for the office of her attorney," leaving orders that Talcott's body be taken to the Western Casket Company for cremation. According to one newspaper's account, "Seemingly unmoved, she took one glance at the body and said, 'That's my husband.' She then turned and walked out." Talcott's body was discovered to have large stones in his pockets, lumps of coal concealed in his clothing and a bundle containing other weights grasped in his hand.

Police also discovered several documents on Talcott's body. The documents included the letter from Mrs. Talcott's sister urging Talcott to act, a grand jury subpoena from the investigation of Moore, and quantities of advertising literature for Hydrox Ice Cream. However, the item that drew the most attention in the press was a cryptic handwritten note that appeared to contain a threat against Talcott. The note read, "Friday, P.M. -- I will give you until tomorrow morning before you leave the house to withdraw from this case or I will introduce [two words obliterated] damaging evidence of six years ago." Talcott's brother-in-law, George E. Repp, told police that he believed the note was Talcott's effort to record a threat made by Mrs. Talcott. Repp described an angry encounter at the Talcott residence:

Talcott, in writing the threat, was but quoting the words of his own wife. I was with them in the Talcott home the day before Talcott testified against Dr. Moore. Mrs. Talcott then threatened to reveal happenings of six years ago if he didn't drop out of Monroe's prosecution."

Mrs. Talcott's attorney told reporters that the "damaging evidence of six years ago" may have referred to "a domestic trouble of some kind" between the couple while Talcott was employed with the Chicago Tribune in Paris. However, he declined to elaborate, and Mrs. Talcott also refused to comment.

=== Aftermath ===
Public and press attention continued to focus on Moore and Mrs. Talcott following Talcott's suicide. On September 12, 1922, after Moore and his assistant were charged by the Assistant State's Attorney with conspiracy to operate a confidence game and obtain money by false pretenses, Mrs. Talcott appeared at the Criminal Court building seeking to post property valued at $7,000 to secure Moore's release. Her effort initially fell short, but the bond was reduced and Mrs. Talcott signed for Moore and his assistant.

In November 1922, Moore was tried, convicted and sentenced to 90 days in jail, but the conviction was later overturned. At the trial, Mrs. Talcott testified that the institute aimed "to establish ultimate peace in the world by making people happy, giving them good health, mental and financial." She added, "I wouldn't marry him [Moore], for he has a wife and seven children. But I can love him as a priest. I think he's the greatest man in the world."

Moore relocated to a 130-acre farm located five miles outside of Harvard, Illinois, along the Wisconsin border. Moore established a commune that he called the "Humanity Trust" in "Heaven City." Moore faced further legal troubles in 1925 when a 50-year-old follower died following a boxing match with a 15-year-old girl with whom he was having an affair. Though Moore was exonerated of any wrongdoing, the Chicago Tribune published a report on the commune in June 1925, describing the facility as a "drab farm with one main dwelling, and a big white barn" where ten families live, work, study, play and practice "a strange communism." The Tribune reported that the inhabitants of the commune included "Mrs. Shirley Talcott and her three children."

In 1934, Mrs. Talcott again followed Moore when he relocated Heaven City to a 362-acre farm in Mukwonago, Wisconsin. Mrs. Talcott stayed at Moore's side until his death in 1963 at age 82. In 1977, The Milwaukee Journal published a feature story on Mrs. Talcott, who, at age 95, was still living at Heaven City. Mrs. Talcott told the newspaper, "Mr. Moore was a teacher of metaphysics ... Mr. Moore was a wizard with people. He knew the workings of the mind." Mrs. Talcott died in 1978, and Heaven City was disbanded in 1979.
