= William Caley =

American football player, lawyer, and mine operator (1873–1918)

William H. Caley
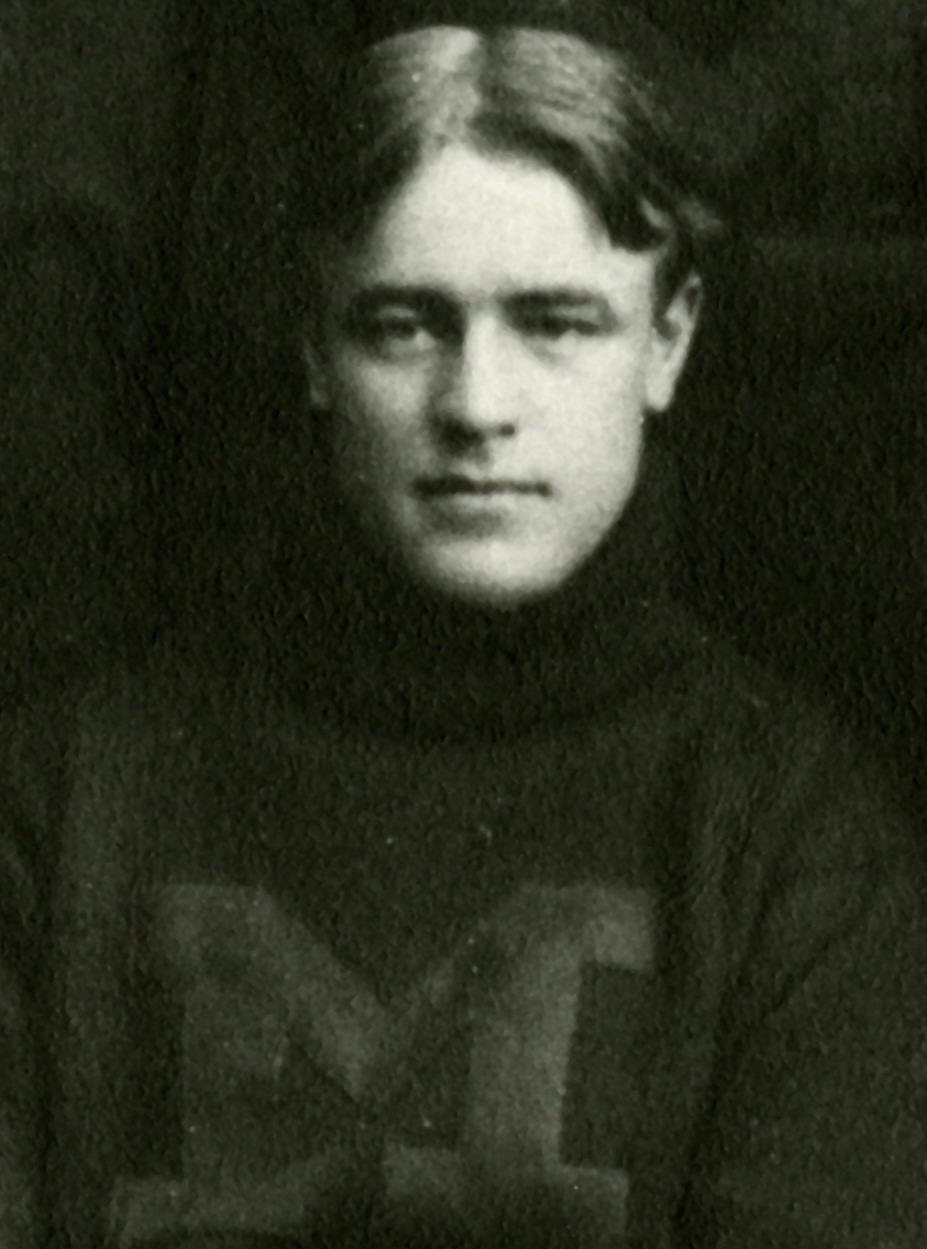
- Caley cropped from 1898 Michigan Wolverines football team portrait

Profile
- Positions: Guard, Halfback, Fullback

Personal information
- Born: July 1873; Missouri, U.S.
- Died: January 15, 1918 (aged 44); Los Cerrillos, New Mexico, U.S.
- Listed height: 6 ft 0.5 in (1.84 m)
- Listed weight: 195 lb (88 kg)

Career information
- College: Colorado (1893–1895); Michigan (1896–1898)

Awards and highlights
- All-Western (1898)

William Henry "Big Bill" Caley (July 1873 – January 15, 1918) was an American football player, lawyer, and mine operator. He played college football for the University of Colorado at Boulder from 1893 to 1895 and for the University of Michigan from 1896 to 1898. With runs of 75 and 80 yards in 1894 and 1895, he set the all-time Colorado Buffaloes record for longest rushing play – a record that was not broken for nearly 40 years. He was also the second leading scorer on the undefeated 1898 Michigan Wolverines football team that won the university's first Western Conference (now known as the Big Ten Conference) football championship. He was selected as a first-team All-Western player by both Caspar Whitney and the Chicago Daily Tribune. After graduating from Michigan, he returned to Colorado where he practiced law and operated grocery and mining businesses.

== Early life ==
Caley was born in 1873 in Missouri. His parents, Franklin T. and Grace (Ormiston) Caley, moved to Colorado when Caley was an infant. His father operated a hotel and engaged in the mining, cattle, and butcher businesses at Alma, Colorado. In the 1890s, the family moved to a 1,600-acre ranch near Littleton, Colorado, eventually operating a cheese factory that became one of the leading businesses in the Littleton area.

== University of Colorado ==
Caley studied as an undergraduate at the University of Colorado at Boulder. While attending Colorado, he played at the halfback position on the football team from 1893 to 1895. He was the captain of the 1895 Colorado Silver and Gold football team. As team captain, he led a group that recruited Fred Folsom to the University of Colorado as its football coach in 1895. His 80-yard run in a 28–0 victory over Denver on November 5, 1895, was a Colorado Buffaloes rushing record for nearly 40 years; it remains one of the longest runs in the program's history. He had previously set the record with a 75-yard run in a 67–0 victory over Colorado Agricultural on October 27, 1894. He was selected as the best all-round athlete at the University of Colorado's field day in 1895. In 1904, a writer in the Denver Times wrote that Caley was "probably the best football player ever turned out of the University of Colorado."

== University of Michigan ==
Caley enrolled at the University of Michigan as a law student in 1896. Caley received his Bachelor of Laws degree from Michigan in 1899.

Caley later recalled that he enrolled at Michigan to study law, not to play football. While watching the team practice one night, Michigan's football coach William Ward spotted Caley and asked him to put on a uniform and play. During the first practice session, Caley broke the leg of Michigan's captain. When he did not show up for practice the next day, Ward came looking for him. When Caley said he did not wish to play football, Ward insisted that the team needed him. Caley recalled his response to the coach as follows: "Well, I'm paying you good money to come here and study law, and if you want me to play football you will have to pay me. I'll play the season out for $350, and if we beat Chicago it will cost you $500." Ward laughed at the proposition, and Caley continued studying law. During a game against Purdue, Ward saw Caley watching the game from the stands and talked with him during halftime. Caley suited up and joined the team for the second half.

Caley became a key player on the Michigan Wolverines football team from 1896 to 1898. In 1897, he helped lead the Wolverines to a 34–0 victory in the inaugural game of the Michigan–Ohio State football rivalry. The Michigan Daily in October 1897 noted that Caley's work was "especially strong" and continued: "Caley opened holes of the biggest kind in the Ohio line and made interference that repeatedly enabled the backs to make long runs."

In 1898, Caley was the second leading scorer on the undefeated Michigan football team that compiled a 10–0 record and won the university's first Western Conference (now known as the Big Ten Conference) football championship. Caley began the 1898 season as Michigan's starting left guard. On October 23, 1898, Caley scored three touchdowns in a 23–0 victory over Notre Dame. In the last two games of the season, he was moved to the fullback position and also handled punting duties. After a 22–0 victory over Beloit College, the Chicago Daily Tribune reported that Caley's strong punting (40 to 55 yards per attempt) gained Michigan 15 to 20 yards on the exchange of punts and that his "punting was faultless, and his line bucking set the crowd wild." The 1898 Western Conference championship was determined by a Thanksgiving Day game between Michigan and Chicago. The Michigan Alumnus praised Caley for his efforts against Chicago:

He took up the duties of his new [fullback] position in perfect style, and soon showed that he was fairly entitled to be called the best all-round football player on the 'Varsity this year. As a punter and line bucker, and in his work on the defensive too much credit cannot be given Caley. His work in the Chicago game, while not so spectacular as that of some others was what kept Chicago from gaining effectively through the line, and he stopped no less than twenty-two plays in that game by his presence at the weak spots.

The University of Michigan yearbook for 1899 included a poem titled "Mighty Bill" dedicated to Caley's efforts against Chicago. In part, the poem states:

King Somus called around last night
And quite a time we had, –
Talking 'bout the game in which
Bill Caley knocked 'em sad –
...
Chicago thought they had a cinch
In fact I think they did;
Till Billiam took his good right foot
And kicked the little lid

At the end of the 1898 season Caspar Whitney (the originator of the practice of naming All-American teams) and the Chicago Daily Tribune both selected Caley as a first-team member of their All-Western teams. The Chicago Daily Tribune wrote: "Caley is another excellent guard, although Michigan used him at full back. He is probably a better guard than any of the other players in the position on Western teams."

Caley also competed for the University of Michigan's varsity track team in weights. He finished in second place in the discus throw at the Western Collegiate Athletic Meet held at Marshall Field in Chicago on June 4, 1898. He also won the shot put event at the 'Varsity Field Meet held at Regents Field on May 25, 1898.

== Later life ==
Caley returned to Colorado after receiving his law degree. At the time of the 1900 United States census, he was living in the Cripple Creek District at Victor, Colorado, where he was employed as an attorney. He was at that time in a law partnership known as Binner & Caley. He also played on the Victor football team in 1900. In 1902, Caley was practicing law in Denver. That same year, he received a patent for an automatic safety device for passenger-carrying cars.

By 1903, Caley had moved to Littleton where he operated a grocery store at 305 West Main Street. From 1908 to 1909, he served as Littleton's city attorney. He also served for a time as the Arapahoe County Attorney and practiced law in Littleton during the 1910s. He was married to Emaline J. Henes.

Caley was also involved in football coaching. He was hired in 1903 as the football coach at Colorado Agricultural College (now known as Colorado State University).

Caley also owned interests in mines. He died in January 1918 at the Cash Entry mine in Los Cerillos, Santa Fe County, New Mexico, when he became caught in an engine belt and was "torn to pieces."
