= John Bennett (Australian footballer) =

Australian rules footballer

Personal information
- Full name: John J. Bennett
- Born: 5 October 1960 (age 66)
- Original team: East Brighton
- Height: 183 cm (6 ft 0 in)
- Weight: 83 kg (183 lb)

Playing career^{1}
Years	Club	Games (Goals)
1980–1983	St Kilda	18 (16)
1984	Footscray	3 (8)
1985–1986	St Kilda	17 (25)
Total		38 (49)
- ^{1} Playing statistics correct to the end of 1986.

John Bennett (born 5 October 1960) is a former Australian rules footballer who played with St Kilda and Footscray in the Victorian Football League (VFL).

== VFL career ==
Bennett, a left-footed forward from East Brighton, first broke into the St Kilda team in the 1980 VFL season. He made two appearances that year, in rounds six and ten, then injured his ankle and missed the rest of the season. In 1981 he played 12 league games, with his best performance coming against South Melbourne at Waverley Park, where he had 23 disposals and kicked six goals. In 1982 and 1983, he played just four games in total, also appearing for Sandringham in the latter year.

In 1984, Bennett played for Footscray, but was only picked for three senior games, despite good performances in the reserves where he kicked 84 goals and won the reserve grade goal kicking.

He returned to St Kilda in 1985 and made a career high 16 appearances that season. His 25 goals were enough for him to finish second in the St Kilda goal-kicking, behind Tony Lockett.

During the 1986 season, Bennett went back to Sandringham and played there for the rest of the decade, kicking over 200 goals. He topped Sandringham's goal-kicking in 1987 and 1988.

== Southern Football League ==
Bennett was coach of East Brighton throughout the 1990s, with premierships in 1991 (South East Suburban Football League) and 1993 (Southern Football League Division 1). In the season of the 1991 premiership, Bennett kicked 116 goals. He joined Heatherton as coach in 2002 and steered them to a Division 2 premiership in both 2006 and 2009. His last season as coach was in 2010.

Over the course of his career, Bennett has coached over 300 games for seven grand finals with four premierships.

In 2015 was inducted into the Southern Football Netball League Hall of Fame and was described as classy, strong, skillful and a great leader.

In 2017 John took on the Presidency of Heatherton Football Club to hopefully build The Tonners in to a successful club.

== Personal life ==
Bennett is a regular contributor to the local radio show on 88.3FM on Sunday mornings. John is also a regular attendee at StKilda Past players & Officials reunions and events.

His son, Josh Bennett, played for a number of clubs, including for Sandringham and Frankston in the VFL, Heatherton in the SFNL and AFL Canberra club Ainslie.
