= Jack Bennett (footballer, born 1913) =

Australian rules footballer

Personal information
- Full name: Francis Jack Bennett
- Born: 21 February 1913; Moonee Ponds, Victoria
- Died: 26 June 1975 (aged 62); Brighton, Victoria
- Original team: Auburn
- Height: 178 cm (5 ft 10 in)
- Weight: 73 kg (161 lb)
- Position: Half forward flank

Playing career^{1}
| Years | Club | Games (Goals) |
| 1933–1936 | Melbourne | 43 (28) |
- ^{1} Playing statistics correct to the end of 1936.

Francis Jack Bennett (21 February 1913 – 26 June 1975) was an Australian rules footballer who played with Melbourne in the Victorian Football League (VFL).

== Family ==
The son of Francis Alexander Bennett (1884-1956), and Frances Theresa Bennett, née Grieves, Francis Jack Bennett was born at Moonee Ponds, Victoria on 21 February 1913.

He married twice: to Marjory Frederica Forster (1914-1970) on 7 May 1938, and to Alice Eileen Gardner (1912-1990) on 6 March 1973.

== Football ==
=== Auburn (SDFL) ===
He played with the Auburn Football Club in the Sub-District Football League.

=== Melbourne (VFL) ===
He was granted a clearance from Auburn to Melbourne on 26 April 1933. In his five seasons at Melbourne he played in 43 senior games, and scored 28 goals: 1933 (6 games), 1934 (15 games, 7 goals), 1935 (12 games, 11 goals), and 1936 (10 games, 10 goals). He played with the Melbourne Seconds for the entire 1937 season.

== Death ==
He died at Brighton, Victoria on 26 June 1975.
