= John Bennett (footballer, born 1949) =

English footballer

Personal information
- Full name: John Bennett
- Date of birth: 15 May 1949 (age 77)
- Place of birth: Rotherham, England
- Position: Winger

Youth career
- Rotherham United

Senior career*
Years	Team	Apps	(Gls)
1965–1966	Rotherham United	1	(0)
- Chelmsford City
- * Club domestic league appearances and goals

John Bennett (born 15 May 1949) is an English former footballer who played as a winger.

== Career ==
Bennett began his career at Rotherham United, playing for the club as an apprentice. Bennett made his only first team appearance for the club in the 1965–1966 Second Division. After leaving Rotherham, Bennett joined Chelmsford City.
