= John Bennet (writer) =

English writer

- Born: St. Margaret, Westminster, England
- Died: 6 October 1686
- Occupation: Writer

John Bennet (died 6 October 1686) was an English writer.

== Early life ==
Bennet was born in the parish of St. Margaret, Westminster, and was educated at Westminster School. In 1676 he was elected student of Christ Church, Oxford. He took the degree of B.A. in June 1680, and that of M.A. in April 1683.

== Career ==
Before graduating as M.A. he published a pamphlet entitled "Constantius the Apostate. Being a short Account of his Life, and the Sense of the Primitive Christians about Succession. Wherein is shown the Unlawfulness of excluding the next Heir on account of Religion, and the Necessity of passive Obedience, as well to the unlawful Oppressor as legal Persecutor" (London, 1683). This was one of the many replies called forth by the celebrated work of Samuel Johnson (chaplain to Lord William Russell), entitled "Julian the Apostate." In Johnson's book the behaviour of the Christians towards Julian was used as an argument in favour of the exclusion of the Duke of York (afterwards James II) from the succession on the ground of popery. Bennet in his reply urges that the Arian Constantius afforded a truer parallel than Julian to the case of a popish sovereign of England, and parodying Johnson's method, endeavours to show that Constantius's orthodox subjects recognised the duty of "passive obedience" to a heretic emperor. The arguments on both sides are now equally obsolete, but it is easy to see that Bennet was no match for his antagonist, either in knowledge of history or in controversial ability. Johnson, however, thought his reasoning worthy of a special refutation. Bennet afterwards studied medicine. He died on 6 October 1686, and was buried in Christ Church Cathedral, Oxford.
