= Jack Bennett (footballer, born 1922) =

Australian rules footballer

Personal information
- Full name: John Humby Bennett
- Born: 20 November 1922; North Melbourne, Victoria
- Died: 2 August 2009 (aged 86)
- Original team: West Melbourne (VFASD)
- Height: 173 cm (5 ft 8 in)
- Weight: 73 kg (161 lb)

Playing career^{1}
Years	Club	Games (Goals)
1942–46	North Melbourne	26 (1)
- ^{1} Playing statistics correct to the end of 1946.

John Humby Bennett (20 November 1922 – 2 August 2009) was an Australian rules footballer who played with North Melbourne in the Victorian Football League (VFL).

== Personal life ==
Bennett served as a gunner in the Australian Army during the Second World War.
