= John W. F. Bennett =

American civil engineer and football player (1875–1943)

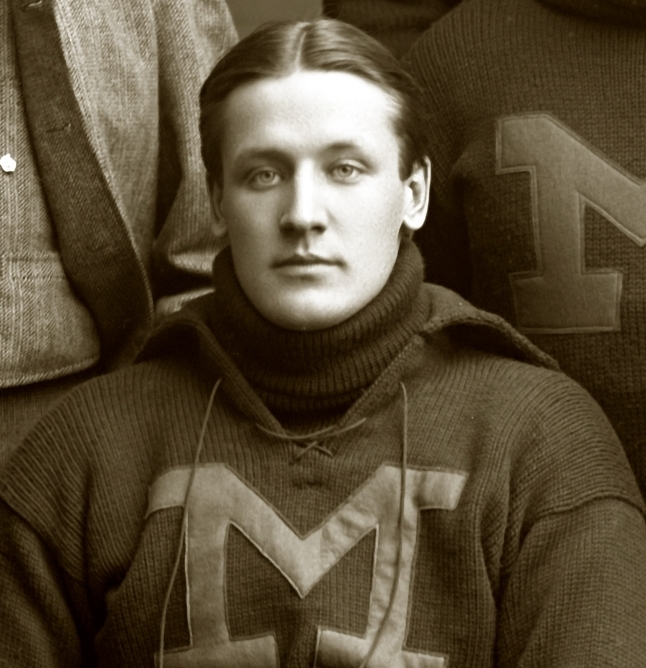
- John W.F. Bennett, 1897

Biographical details
- Born: c. 1875; Chicago, Illinois
- Died: August 30, 1943; New York, New York

Playing career
- 1896–1898: Michigan
- Positions: Guard, end

John W. F. Bennett (c. 1875 – August 30, 1943) was an American civil engineer and football player. He played football for the University of Michigan from 1896 to 1898. As a civil engineer, he supervised the construction of important buildings in New York and London, including the Algonquin Hotel in New York and the Ritz and Waldorf Hotels in London.

== Biography ==
=== Early years ===
Bennett was born in Chicago in approximately 1875. His father, John Wesley Bennett (1837–1920), was a lawyer in Chicago who had served as a lieutenant colonel in the Army of the Potomac during the American Civil War. In 1885, the family moved to Austin, Illinois, which was then a sparsely settled suburb of Chicago. Bennett played football at Austin High School.

=== University of Michigan ===
After graduating from high school, Bennett enrolled at the University of Michigan. He played for the Michigan Wolverines football and track teams for three years. He played football at the guard position in 1896 and at end in 1897 and 1898. He was the captain of the 1898 team that won the school's first Western Conference championship with an undefeated and tie-free record of 10–0. At the time of his election as the Michigan team captain, the Detroit Free Press wrote: "Bennett is a Michigan player through and through, and his rise to his present position of prominence in football circles came by steady, hard work." He graduated from Michigan in 1899 with a Bachelor of Science degree in civil engineering.

Bennett remained active in University of Michigan affairs in his later years. He was the president of the University of Michigan Club from 1917 to 1918. He also served as president of the "M" Club, the organization of Michigan's varsity letter winners, from 1939 to 1941. In 1943, he was elected president of the Touchdown Club of America.

=== Engineering career ===
Bennett worked for the Thompson-Starrett Company in New York from 1901 to 1904. During these years, he supervised the construction of the St. Regis and Algonquin Hotels in New York and a factory for Bailey Banks and Biddle, jewelers, in Philadelphia.

From 1904 to 1909, Bennett worked for the Waring-White Building Company of London, England. During this time, he supervised the construction of the Ritz Hotel, the Waldorf Hotel, the Morning Post Building, three London Underground stations, the Liverpool Cotton Exchange and the Lancaster Town Hall.

Bennett returned to New York in 1910 and served as the New York City Deputing and Acting Commissioner of Water Supply. In that position, he advised the city on engineering matters arising out of the water department's $10 million annual budget. From 1914 to 1918, Bennett was a consulting engineer working for the president of the Borough of Bronx.

During World War I, Bennett served in the United States Army. He was a major in the Quartermaster Corps and supervised the construction of a supply base in Brooklyn, New York.

After being discharged from the Army, Bennett worked for the American Sugar Refining Company from 1919 to 1923. He was chairman of the company's engineering consulting board and oversaw the construction of the company's refinery in Baltimore, Maryland. In 1924, Bennett was hired by the engineering and construction firm, Stevens & Wood, Inc. He was a vice president of the company from 1924 to 1930.

=== Family and death ===
In his later years, Bennett lived at 1105 Park Avenue in New York. His wife, Harriet Connable Bennett, died in 1941. Bennett died at his Park Avenue home in 1943 at age 68. He was survived by his son John Connable Bennett, who was serving in the U.S. Army Air Forces at the time. His grandson, John C. Bennett Jr., was living with Bennett at the time of Bennett's death.
