= John E. Bennett (scientist) =

American physician-scientist

John Eugene Bennett (born 1933) is an American physician-scientist. He is a senior investigator in the clinical mycology section in the intramural research program at the National Institute of Allergy and Infectious Diseases.

== Education ==
Bennett received a B.S. in chemistry (cum laude) from Stanford University. He earned a M.D. (Alpha Omega Alpha) from Johns Hopkins University School of Medicine. Bennett is board-certified in internal medicine and infectious disease.

== Career ==
In 1997, Bennett was the chief of the clinical mycology section in the laboratory of clinical investigation at the National Institute of Allergy and Infectious Diseases (NIAID). He directed the NIAID infectious disease clinical training program. As of 2017, Bennett is a senior investigator in the clinical mycology section of the intramural research program in National Institute of Allergy and Infectious Diseases. Bennett is co-editor of seven editions of Principles and Practice of Infectious Diseases; and consultant to the Centers for Disease Control and Prevention, American College of Physicians, American Public Health Association, Food and Drug Administration, and United States Department of Defense.

=== Research ===
Bennett researches pathogenesis, diagnosis, treatment, prevention, and epidemiology of mycoses, particularly cryptococcosis and candidiasis. He also researches idiopathic CD4 lymphocytopenia and clinical trials of antifungal agents. Bennett and Peter Richard Williamson are studying previously healthy patients with cryptococcal meningitis to discover underlying predisposing factors and improve therapy. Despite the absence of immunosuppression, these patients are surprisingly difficult to treat compared to those with AIDS and cryptococcosis. A major cause of morbidity and death is cerebral edema and increased intracranial pressure, which usually coexist. The goals in studying these patients include: understanding the mechanisms causing cerebral edema and increased intracranial pressure, searching for genetic markers in the patients and their families that might have predisposed patients to cryptococcosis, assessing the role of corticosteroids in controlling cerebral edema, and evaluating potential new treatments for cryptococcosis.

== Awards and honors ==
Bennett's honors include master in the American College of Physicians; charter president of the Greater Washington Infectious Diseases Society; member of the American Society for Clinical Investigation and the American Association of Physicians. In 1997, he was appointed president of the Infectious Diseases Society of America where he had served as vice president and participated on numerous committees of the society.
