= List of Purdue Boilermakers football seasons =

The Purdue Boilermakers, a college football team based in Indiana, has competed every season since 1889. The team has played in the Indiana Intercollegiate Athletic Association, the Western Conference and the Big Ten Conference. The team last won a conference title in 2000.

== Seasons ==
| Year | Coach | Overall | Conference | Standing | Bowl/playoffs | Coaches^{#} | AP^{°} |
|---|---|---|---|---|---|---|---|
Albert Berg (Independent) (1887)
| 1887 | Albert Berg | 0–1 | | | | | |
| 1888 | No team | | | | | | |
George Reisner (Independent) (1889)
| 1889 | George Reisner | 2–1 | | | | | |
Clinton Hare (Indiana Intercollegiate Athletic Association) (1890)
| 1890 | Clinton Hare | 3–3 | 2–1 | 2nd | | | |
Knowlton Ames (Indiana Intercollegiate Athletic Association) (1891–1892)
| 1891 | Knowlton Ames | 4–0 | 4–0 | 1st | | | |
| 1892 | Knowlton Ames | 8–0 | 4–0 | 1st | | | |
D. M. Balliet (Indiana Intercollegiate Athletic Association) (1893–1894)
| 1893 | D. M. Balliet | 5–2–1 | 4–0 | 1st | | | |
| 1894 | D. M. Balliet | 9–1 | 4–0 | 1st | | | |
D. M. Balliet (Independent) (1895)
| 1895 | D. M. Balliet | 4–3 | | | | | |
S.M. Hammond (Western Conference) (1896)
| 1896 | S.M. Hammond | 4–2–1 | 0–2–1 | T–6th | | | |
William Church (Western Conference) (1897)
| 1897 | William Church | 5–3–1 | 1–2 | 5th | | | |
Alpha Jamison (Western Conference) (1898–1900)
| 1898 | Alpha Jamison | 3–3 | 0–1 | T–6th | | | |
| 1899 | Alpha Jamison | 4–4–1 | 1–2 | 5th | | | |
| 1900 | Alpha Jamison | 4–4 | 0–4 | 9th | | | |
D. M. Balliet (Western Conference) (1901)
| 1901 | D. M. Balliet | 4–4–1 | 0–3–1 | T–7th | | | |
Charles Best (Western Conference) (1902)
| 1902 | Charles Best | 7–2–1 | 2–2 | 5th | | | |
Oliver Cutts (Western Conference) (1903–1904)
| 1903 | Oliver Cutts | 4–2 | 0–2 | 8th | | | |
| 1904 | Oliver Cutts | 9–3 | 1–2 | T–5th | | | |
Albert Hernstein (Western Conference) (1905)
| 1905 | Albert Hernstein | 6–1–1 | 1–1–1 | 4th | | | |
Myron Witham (Western Conference) (1906)
| 1906 | Myron Witham | 0–5 | 0–3 | T–6th | | | |
Leigh Turner (Western Conference) (1907)
| 1907 | Leigh Turner | 0–5 | 0–3 | T–5th | | | |
Frederick Speik (Western Conference) (1908–1909)
| 1908 | Frederick Speik | 4–3 | 1–3 | T–4th | | | |
| 1909 | Frederick Speik | 2–5 | 0–4 | T–7th | | | |
Marquis Horr (Western Conference) (1910–1912)
| 1910 | Marquis Horr | 1–5 | 0–4 | 8th | | | |
| 1911 | Marquis Horr | 3–4 | 1–3 | 6th | | | |
| 1912 | Marquis Horr | 4–2–1 | 2–2–1 | T–3rd | | | |
Andy Smith (Western Conference) (1913–1915)
| 1913 | Andy Smith | 4–1–2 | 2–1–2 | T–2nd | | | |
| 1914 | Andy Smith | 5–2 | 2–2 | 4th | | | |
| 1915 | Andy Smith | 3–3–1 | 2–2 | 5th | | | |
Cleo O'Donnell (Western Conference) (1916–1917)
| 1916 | Cleo O'Donnell | 2–4–1 | 0–4–1 | T–8th | | | |
| 1917 | Cleo O'Donnell | 3–4 | 0–4 | T–8th | | | |
Arthur Scanlon (Western Conference) (1918–1920)
| 1918 | Arthur Scanlon | 3–3 | 1–0 | T–1st | | | |
| 1919 | Arthur Scanlon | 2–4–1 | 0–3 | T–9th | | | |
| 1920 | Arthur Scanlon | 2–5 | 0–4 | T–9th | | | |
William Dietz (Western Conference) (1921)
| 1921 | William Dietz | 1–6 | 1–4 | T–8th | | | |
Jim Phelan (Western Conference) (1922–1929)
| 1922 | Jim Phelan | 1–5–1 | 0–3 | T–9th | | | |
| 1923 | Jim Phelan | 2–5–1 | 1–4 | T–8th | | | |
| 1924 | Jim Phelan | 5–2 | 2–2 | 5th | | | |
| 1925 | Jim Phelan | 3–4–1 | 0–3–1 | T–9th | | | |
| 1926 | Jim Phelan | 5–2–1 | 2–1–1 | 4th | | | |
| 1927 | Jim Phelan | 6–2 | 2–2 | T–4th | | | |
| 1928 | Jim Phelan | 5–2–1 | 2–2–1 | 6th | | | |
| 1929 | Jim Phelan | 8–0 | 5–0 | 1st | | | |
Noble Kizer (Western Conference) (1930–1936)
| 1930 | Noble Kizer | 6–2 | 4–2 | 3rd | | | |
| 1931 | Noble Kizer | 9–1 | 5–1 | T–1st | | | |
| 1932 | Noble Kizer | 7–0–1 | 5–0–1 | T–1st | | | |
| 1933 | Noble Kizer | 6–1–1 | 3–1–1 | 3rd | | | |
| 1934 | Noble Kizer | 5–3 | 3–1 | 4th | | | |
| 1935 | Noble Kizer | 4–4 | 3–3 | T–3rd | | | |
| 1936 | Noble Kizer | 5–2–1 | 3–1–1 | T–4th | | | |
Mal Elward (Western Conference) (1937–1941)
| 1937 | Mal Elward | 4–3–1 | 2–2–1 | T–4th | | | |
| 1938 | Mal Elward | 5–1–2 | 3–1–1 | T–2nd | | | |
| 1939 | Mal Elward | 3–3–2 | 2–1–2 | 3rd | | | |
| 1940 | Mal Elward | 2–6 | 1–4 | 8th | | | |
| 1941 | Mal Elward | 2–5–1 | 1–3 | T–7th | | | |
Elmer Burnham (Western Conference) (1942–1943)
| 1942 | Elmer Burnham | 1–8 | 1–4 | 8th | | | |
| 1943 | Elmer Burnham | 9–0 | 6–0 | T–1st | | | 5 |
Cecil Isbell (Western Conference) (1944–1946)
| 1944 | Cecil Isbell | 5–5 | 4–2 | 3rd | | | |
| 1945 | Cecil Isbell | 7–3 | 3–3 | T–4th | | | |
| 1946 | Cecil Isbell | 2–6–1 | 0–5–1 | 9th | | | |
Stu Holcomb (Western / Big Ten Conference) (1947–1955)
| 1947 | Stu Holcomb | 5–4 | 3–3 | T–3rd | | | |
| 1948 | Stu Holcomb | 3–6 | 2–4 | T–5th | | | |
| 1949 | Stu Holcomb | 4–5 | 2–4 | 8th | | | |
| 1950 | Stu Holcomb | 2–7 | 1–4 | 9th | | | |
| 1951 | Stu Holcomb | 5–4 | 4–1 | 2nd | | 14 | |
| 1952 | Stu Holcomb | 4–3–2 | 4–1–1 | T–1st | | 12 | 18 |
| 1953 | Stu Holcomb | 2–7 | 2–4 | 8th | | | |
| 1954 | Stu Holcomb | 5–3–1 | 3–3 | 6th | | | |
| 1955 | Stu Holcomb | 5–3–1 | 4–2–1 | | | | |
Jack Mollenkopf (Big Ten Conference) (1956–1969)
| 1956 | Jack Mollenkopf | 3–4–2 | 1–4–2 | T–7th | | | |
| 1957 | Jack Mollenkopf | 5–4 | 4–3 | T–4th | | | |
| 1958 | Jack Mollenkopf | 6–1–2 | 3–1–2 | 3rd | | 11 | 13 |
| 1959 | Jack Mollenkopf | 5–2–2 | 4–2–1 | 4th | | | |
| 1960 | Jack Mollenkopf | 4–4–1 | 2–4 | T–5th | | 16 | 19 |
| 1961 | Jack Mollenkopf | 6–3 | 4–2 | | | 11 | |
| 1962 | Jack Mollenkopf | 4–4–1 | 3–3 | T–5th | | | |
| 1963 | Jack Mollenkopf | 5–4 | 4–3 | 4th | | | |
| 1964 | Jack Mollenkopf | 6–3 | 5–2 | 4th | | | |
| 1965 | Jack Mollenkopf | 7–2–1 | 5–2 | 3rd | | 13 | |
| 1966 | Jack Mollenkopf | 9–2 | 6–1 | 2nd | W Rose | 6 | 7 |
| 1967 | Jack Mollenkopf | 8–2 | 6–2 | T–1st | | 9 | 9 |
| 1968 | Jack Mollenkopf | 8–2 | 5–2 | 3rd | | 11 | 10 |
| 1969 | Jack Mollenkopf | 8–2 | 5–2 | 3rd | | 18 | 18 |
Bob DeMoss (Big Ten Conference) (1970–1972)
| 1970 | Bob DeMoss | 4–6 | 2–5 | 8th | | | |
| 1971 | Bob DeMoss | 3–7 | 3–5 | T–6th | | | |
| 1972 | Bob DeMoss | 6–5 | 6–2 | 3rd | | | |
Alex Agase (Big Ten Conference) (1973–1976)
| 1973 | Alex Agase | 5–6 | 4–4 | 8th | | | |
| 1974 | Alex Agase | 4–6–1 | 3–5 | 6th | | | |
| 1975 | Alex Agase | 4–7 | 4–4 | 8th | | | |
| 1976 | Alex Agase | 5–6 | 4–4 | T–3rd | | | |
Jim Young (Big Ten Conference) (1977–1981)
| 1977 | Jim Young | 5–6 | 3–5 | T–6th | | | |
| 1978 | Jim Young | 9–2–1 | 6–1–1 | 3rd | W Peach | 13 | 13 |
| 1979 | Jim Young | 10–2 | 7–1 | 2nd | W Bluebonnet | 10 | 10 |
| 1980 | Jim Young | 9–3 | 7–1 | T–2nd | W Liberty | 16 | 17 |
| 1981 | Jim Young | 5–6 | 3–6 | T–8th | | | |
Leon Burtnett (Big Ten Conference) (1982–1986)
| 1982 | Leon Burtnett | 3–8 | 3–6 | 7th | | | |
| 1983 | Leon Burtnett | 3–7–1 | 3–5–1 | 6th | | | |
| 1984 | Leon Burtnett | 7–5 | 6–3 | T–2nd | L Peach | | |
| 1985 | Leon Burtnett | 5–6 | 3–5 | 7th | | | |
| 1986 | Leon Burtnett | 3–8 | 2–6 | T–8th | | | |
Fred Akers (Big Ten Conference) (1987–1990)
| 1987 | Fred Akers | 3–7–1 | 3–5 | T–6th | | | |
| 1988 | Fred Akers | 4–7 | 3–5 | 6th | | | |
| 1989 | Fred Akers | 3–8 | 2–6 | 8th | | | |
| 1990 | Fred Akers | 2–9 | 1–7 | T–8th | | | |
Jim Colletto (Big Ten Conference) (1991–1996)
| 1991 | Jim Colletto | 4–7 | 3–5 | T–6th | | | |
| 1992 | Jim Colletto | 4–7 | 3–5 | T–6th | | | |
| 1993 | Jim Colletto | 1–10 | 0–8 | T–10th | | | |
| 1994 | Jim Colletto | 5–4–2 (Note: Michigan State self-forfeited all wins in the 1994 season, resulting in Purdue's 1994 loss to Michigan State being retroactively changed to a win.) | 3–3–2 | T–8th | | | |
| 1995 | Jim Colletto | 4–6–1 | 2–5–1 | 9th | | | |
| 1996 | Jim Colletto | 3–8 | 2–6 | 8th | | | |
Joe Tiller (Big Ten Conference) (1997–2008)
| 1997 | Joe Tiller | 9–3 | 6–2 | T–2nd | W Alamo | 15 | 15 |
| 1998 | Joe Tiller | 9–4 | 6–2 | 4th | W Alamo | 23 | 24 |
| 1999 | Joe Tiller | 7–5 | 4–4 | T–6th | L Outback | | 25 |
| 2000 | Joe Tiller | 8–4 | 6–2 | T–1st | L Rose^{†} | 13 | 13 |
| 2001 | Joe Tiller | 6–6 | 4–4 | T–4th | L Sun | | |
| 2002 | Joe Tiller | 7–6 | 4–4 | T–5th | W Sun | | |
| 2003 | Joe Tiller | 9–4 | 6–2 | T–2nd | L Capital One | 19 | 18 |
| 2004 | Joe Tiller | 7–5 | 4–4 | T–5th | L Sun | | |
| 2005 | Joe Tiller | 5–6 | 3–5 | 8th | | | |
| 2006 | Joe Tiller | 8–6 | 5–3 | T–4th | L Champs Sports | | |
| 2007 | Joe Tiller | 8–5 | 3–5 | T–7th | W Motor City | | |
| 2008 | Joe Tiller | 4–8 | 2–6 | T–9th | | | |
Danny Hope (Big Ten Conference) (2009–2012)
| 2009 | Danny Hope | 5–7 | 4–4 | T–6th | | | |
| 2010 | Danny Hope | 4–8 | 2–6 | T–9th | | | |
| 2011 | Danny Hope | 7–6 | 4–4 | 3rd (Leaders) | W Little Caesars Pizza | | |
| 2012 | Danny Hope (Note: The team was led by head coach Danny Hope, who was in his fourth season and was fired after the end of the regular season. Patrick Higgins coached the bowl game.) | 6–7 | 3–5 | 4th (Leaders) | L Heart of Dallas | | |
Darrell Hazell (Big Ten Conference) (2013–2016)
| 2013 | Darrell Hazell | 1–11 | 0–8 | 6th (Leaders) | | | |
| 2014 | Darrell Hazell | 3–9 | 1–7 | 7th (West) | | | |
| 2015 | Darrell Hazell | 2–10 | 1–7 | 7th (West) | | | |
| 2016 | Darrell Hazell (Note: Purdue was led by fourth-year head coach Darrell Hazell until he was fired on October 16, 2016. Gerad Parker was named the interim head coach for the remainder of the season.) | 3–9 | 1–8 | 7th (West) | | | |
Jeff Brohm (Big Ten Conference) (2017–2022)
| 2017 | Jeff Brohm | 7–6 | 4–5 | T–3rd (West) | W Foster Farms | | |
| 2018 | Jeff Brohm | 6–7 | 5–4 | T–2nd (West) | L Music City | | |
| 2019 | Jeff Brohm | 4–8 | 3–6 | T–5th (West) | | | |
| 2020 | Jeff Brohm | 2–4 | 2–4 | 6th (West) | | | |
| 2021 | Jeff Brohm | 9–4 | 6–3 | T–2nd (West) | W Music City | | |
| 2022 | Jeff Brohm (Note: On December 7, 2022, head coach Jeff Brohm accepted the head coach position at his alma mater Louisville. His brother and Purdue offensive coordinator Brian Brohm served as interim head coach for the Boilermakers during the Citrus Bowl.) | 8–6 | 6–3 | 1st (West) | L Citrus | | |
Ryan Walters (Big Ten Conference) (2023–2024)
| 2023 | Ryan Walters | 4–8 | 3–6 | T–4th (West) | | | |
| 2024 | Ryan Walters | 1–11 | 0–9 | 18th | | | |
Barry Odom (Big Ten Conference) (2025–present)
| 2025 | Barry Odom | 2–10 | 0–9 | 18th | | | |
| Total: | | 644–618–48 | | | | | |
National championship Conference title Conference division title or championship game berth
^{†}Indicates Bowl Coalition, Bowl Alliance, BCS, or CFP / New Years' Six bowl.; ^{#}Rankings from final Coaches Poll.
