= List of Purdue Boilermakers head football coaches =

List of head football coaches for the Purdue Boilermakers

The Purdue Boilermakers football program is a college football team that represents Purdue University in the Big Ten Conference in the National Collegiate Athletic Association. The team has had 40 head coaches and three interim coaches since it started playing organized football in 1887 and has been known by the nickname Boilermakers since 1891. Purdue is an original member of the Big Ten, joining in 1896 after spending six years in the Indiana Intercollegiate Athletic Association. The Boilermakers have played in 1,260 games during their 134 seasons. Six coaches have led the Boilermakers to postseason bowl games: Jack Mollenkopf, Jim Young, Leon Burtnett, Joe Tiller, Danny Hope, and Jeff Brohm. Nine coaches have won conference championships with the Boilermakers: Snake Ames and D. M. Balliet in the Indiana Intercollegiate Athletic Association, and A. G. Scanlon, James Phelan, Noble Kizer, Elmer Burnham, Stu Holcomb, Mollenkopf and Tiller in the Big Ten. No Purdue coach has led the Boilermakers to a national championship. As of the end of the 2021 season, Tiller is the all-time leader in games coached (149) and wins (87), while Mollenkopf is the all-time leader years coached (14). Ames leads the Boilermakers in winning percentage with a perfect 1.000 in his two seasons at Purdue. Among coaches with more than two seasons of tenure, Kizer has the highest winning percentage, .750, and Ryan Walters has the lowest winning percentage, with a record of 5–19 (.208) in two seasons.

Of the 40 Boilermakers coaches, five have been inducted into the College Football Hall of Fame: Andy Smith, William Henry Dietz, Phelan, Mollenkopf, and Young. None has received National Coach of the Year honors.

== Key ==
Key to symbols in coaches list
General		Overall		Conference		Postseason (Note: Although the first Rose Bowl Game was played in 1902, it has been continuously played since the 1916 game, and is recognized as the oldest bowl game by the NCAA. "—" indicates any season prior to 1916 when postseason games were not played.)	
No.	Order of coaches (Note: A running total of the number of head coaches, with coaches who served separate tenures being counted only once. Interim head coaches are represented with "Int" and are not counted in the running total. "—" indicates the team played but either without a coach or no coach is on record. "X" indicates an interim year without play.)	GC	Games coached	CW	Conference wins	PW	Postseason wins
DC	Division championships	OW	Overall wins	CL	Conference losses	PL	Postseason losses
CC	Conference championships	OL	Overall losses	CT	Conference ties	PT	Postseason ties
NC	National championships	OT	Overall ties (Note: Overtime rules in college football were introduced in 1996, making ties impossible in the period since.)	C%	Conference winning percentage		
†	Elected to the College Football Hall of Fame	O%	Overall winning percentage (Note: When computing the win–loss percentage, a tie counts as half a win and half a loss.)				

== Coaches ==
List of head football coaches showing season(s) coached, overall records, conference records (Note: Purdue has been a member of Big Ten Conference since the 1896 season.), postseason records, championships and selected awards (Note: Statistics correct as of the end of the 2025 NCAA Division I FBS football season.)
No.	Name	Season(s)	GC	OW	OL	OT	O%	CW	CL	CT	C%	PW	PL	PT	DCs	CCs	NCs	Awards
1	Albert Berg	1887	1	0	1	0	.000	—	—	—	—	—	—	—	—	—	0	—
2	George Andrew Reisner	1889	3	2	1	0	0.667	—	—	—	—	—	—	—	—	—	0	—
3	Clinton L. Hare	1889	6	3	3	0	0.500	2	1	0	0.667	—	—	—	—	0	0	—
4	Knowlton Ames^{†}	1891–1892	12	12	0	0	1.000	8	0	0	1.000	—	—	—	—	2	0	—
5	D. M. Balliet	1893–1895; 1901	26	17	8	1	0.673	4	3	1	0.563	—	—	—	—	2 (Note: Total includes the IIAA championship of 1893, a year in which Balliet, Randolph, and Seixas each coached only a portion of the season.)	0	—
6	M. P. Randolph	1893	4	4	0	0	1.000	3	0	0	1.000	—	—	—	—	1	0	—
7	Edward Seixas	1893	2	1	0	1	0.750	1	0	0	1.000	—	—	—	—	1	0	—
8	Samuel M. Hammond	1896	7	4	2	1	0.643	0	2	1	0.167	—	—	—	—	0	0	—
9	William W. Church	1897	9	5	3	1	0.611	1	2	0	0.333	—	—	—	—	0	0	—
10	Alpha Jamison	1898–1900	23	11	11	1	0.500	1	7	0	0.125	—	—	—	—	0	0	—
11	Charles Best	1902	10	7	2	1	0.750	2	2	0	0.500	—	—	—	—	0	0	—
12	Oliver Cutts	1903–1904	18	13	5	0	0.722	1	4	0	0.200	—	—	—	—	0	0	—
13	Albert E. Herrnstein	1903–1904	8	6	1	1	0.813	1	1	1	0.500	—	—	—	—	0	0	—
14	Myron E. Witham	1906	5	0	5	0	.000	0	3	0	.000	—	—	—	—	0	0	—
15	Leigh C. Turner	1907	5	0	5	0	.000	0	3	0	.000	—	—	—	—	0	0	—
16	Frederick A. Speik	1908–1909	14	6	8	0	0.429	1	7	0	0.125	—	—	—	—	0	0	—
17	Bill Horr	1910–1912	16	5	11	0	0.313	1	9	0	0.100	—	—	—	—	0	0	—
18	Keckie Moll	1912	4	3	0	1	0.875	2	0	1	0.833	—	—	—	—	0	0	—
19	Andy Smith^{†}	1913–1915	21	12	6	3	0.643	6	5	2	0.538	—	—	—	—	0	0	—
20	Cleo A. O'Donnell	1916–1917	14	5	8	1	0.393	0	8	1	0.056	—	—	—	—	0	0	—
21	A. G. Scanlon	1918–1920	20	7	12	1	0.375	1	7	0	0.125	—	—	—	—	1	0	—
22	William Henry Dietz^{†}	1921	7	1	6	0	0.143	1	4	0	0.200	—	—	—	—	0	0	—
23	James Phelan^{†}	1922–1929	62	35	22	5	0.605	14	17	4	0.457	—	—	—	—	1	0	—
24	Noble Kizer	1930–1936	58	42	13	3	0.750	26	9	3	0.724	—	—	—	—	2	0	—
25	Mal Elward	1937–1941	40	16	18	6	0.475	9	12	4	0.440	—	—	—	—	0	0	—
26	Elmer Burnham	1942–1943	18	10	8	0	0.556	7	4	0	0.636	—	—	—	—	1	0	—
27	Cecil Isbell	1944–1946	29	14	14	1	0.500	7	10	1	0.417	—	—	—	—	0	0	—
28	Stu Holcomb	1947–1955	81	35	42	4	0.457	25	23	1	0.520	—	—	—	—	1	0	—
29	Jack Mollenkopf^{†}	1956–1969	132	84	39	9	0.670	58	32	5	0.637	1	0	0	—	1	0	—
30	Bob DeMoss	1970–1972	31	13	18	0	0.419	11	12	0	0.478	0	0	0	—	0	0	—
31	Alex Agase	1973–1976	44	18	25	1	0.420	15	17	0	0.469	0	0	0	—	0	0	—
32	Jim Young^{†}	1977–1981	58	38	19	1	0.664	26	14	1	0.646	3	0	0	—	0	0	—
33	Leon Burtnett	1982–1986	56	21	34	1	0.384	17	25	1	0.407	0	1	0	—	0	0	—
34	Fred Akers	1987–1990	44	12	31	1	0.284	9	23	0	0.281	0	0	0	—	0	0	—
35	Jim Colletto	1991–1996	66	21	42	3	0.341	13	32	3	0.302	0	0	0	—	0	0	—
36	Joe Tiller	1997–2008	149	87	62	—	0.584	53	43	—	0.552	4	6	—	—	1	0	—
37	Danny Hope	2009–2012	49	22	27	—	0.449	13	19	—	0.406	1	0	—	0	0	0	—
Int.	Patrick Higgins (Note: Higgins served as interim head coach for the 2013 Heart of Dallas Bowl after Danny Hope was fired.)	2012	1	0	1	—	.000	0	0	—	–	0	1	—	0	0	0	—
38	Darrell Hazell	2013–2016	42	9	33	—	0.214	3	24	—	0.111	0	0	—	0	0	0	—
Int.	Gerad Parker (Note: Parker served as interim head coach for the final six games of the 2016 season after Darrell Hazell was fired.)	2016	6	0	6	—	.000	0	6	—	.000	0	0	—	0	0	0	—
39	Jeff Brohm	2017–2022	70	36	34	—	0.514	26	25	—	0.510	2	1	—	1	0	0	—
Int.	Brian Brohm (Note: Brian Brohm served as interim head coach for the 2023 Citrus Bowl after Jeff Brohm resigned as head coach.)	2022	1	0	1	—	.000	0	0	—	–	0	1	—	0	0	0	—
40	Ryan Walters	2023–2024	24	5	19	—	0.208	3	15	—	0.167	0	0	—	0	0	0	—
41	Barry Odom	2025–present	12	2	10	—	0.167	0	9	—	.000	0	0	—	0	0	0	—
