= List of Indiana Intercollegiate Athletic Association football standings =

This is a list of yearly Indiana Intercollegiate Athletic Association football standings.

== Standings ==
1890 Indiana Intercollegiate Athletic Association football standings
	Conf.					Overall
Team	W		L		T	W		L		T
Butler $	3	–	0	–	1	3	–	0	–	1
Purdue	2	–	1	–	0	3	–	3	–	0
Wabash	0	–	3	–	0	0	–	3	–	0
$ – Conference champion

1891 Indiana Intercollegiate Athletic Association football standings
	Conf.					Overall
Team	W		L		T	W		L		T
Purdue $	4	–	0	–	0	4	–	0	–	0
Butler	3	–	2	–	0	4	–	3	–	0
Wabash	1	–	3	–	0	1	–	3	–	0
Indiana	0	–	5	–	0	1	–	5	–	0
$ – Conference champion

1892 Indiana Intercollegiate Athletic Association football standings
	Conf.					Overall
Team	W		L		T	W		L		T
Purdue $	4	–	0	–	0	8	–	0	–	0
Butler	4	–	1	–	0	5	–	1	–	0
Wabash	1	–	4	–	0	1	–	4	–	0
Indiana	0	–	4	–	0	0	–	4	–	0
$ – Conference champion

1893 Indiana Intercollegiate Athletic Association football standings
	Conf.					Overall
Team	W		L		T	W		L		T
Purdue $	4	–	0	–	0	5	–	2	–	1
DePauw	3	–	1	–	0	6	–	3	–	0
Butler	2	–	2	–	0	4	–	2	–	0
Wabash	1	–	3	–	0	2	–	4	–	0
Indiana	0	–	4	–	0	1	–	4	–	1
$ – Conference champion

1894 Indiana Intercollegiate Athletic Association football standings
	Conf.					Overall
Team	W		L		T	W		L		T
Purdue $	4	–	0	–	0	9	–	1	–	0
Butler	3	–	1	–	0	6	–	1	–	0
Wabash	2	–	3	–	0	4	–	5	–	0
Indiana	0	–	4	–	0	0	–	4	–	1
$ – Conference champion
