= 1898 Western Conference football season =

American college football season

- Sport: Football
- Number of teams: 7
- Champion: Michigan

Football seasons
- ← 1897 1899 →

1898 Western Conference football standings
	Conf.					Overall
Team	W		L		T	W		L		T
Michigan $	3	–	0	–	0	10	–	0	–	0
Chicago	3	–	1	–	0	14	–	2	–	1
Wisconsin	2	–	1	–	0	9	–	1	–	0
Illinois	1	–	1	–	0	4	–	5	–	0
Minnesota	1	–	2	–	0	4	–	5	–	0
Purdue	0	–	1	–	0	3	–	3	–	0
Northwestern	0	–	4	–	0	9	–	4	–	1
$ – Conference champion

The 1898 Western Conference football season was the third season of college football played by the member schools of the Western Conference (later known as the Big Ten Conference) and was a part of the 1898 college football season.

The 1898 Michigan Wolverines football team, under head coach Gustave Ferbert, won the conference championship with a 10–0 record, shut out six opponents, and outscored all opponents by a combined total of 205 to 26. The team concluded its season by playing Amos Alonzo Stagg's 1898 Chicago Maroons football team for the conference championship. The Wolverines beat Chicago by a 12–11 score in a game that inspired Louis Elbel to write Michigan's fight song "The Victors."

Wisconsin, under head coach Philip King, compiled a 9–1 record, lost to Chicago, and finished in third place in the conference.

== Season overview ==
=== Results and team statistics ===
Conf. Rank	Team	Head coach	Overall record	Conf. record	PPG	PAG
1	Michigan	Gustave Ferbert	10–0	3–0	20.5	2.6
2	Chicago	Amos A. Stagg	14–2–1	3–1	17.0	2.8
3	Wisconsin	Philip King	9–1	2–1	31.8	1.7
4	Illinois	George Huff	4–5	1–1	9.2	8.7
5	Minnesota	John Minds	4-5	1-2	10.2	8.1
6	Northwestern	W. H. Bannard	9–4–1	0–4	16.4	8.8
7	Purdue	Alpha Jamison	3–3	0–1	5.7	5.5

Key

PPG = Average of points scored per game
PAG = Average of points allowed per game

=== Regular season ===
Only 10 conference games were played during the 1898 season as follows:

- October 22, 1898: Chicago defeated Northwestern, 34-5, at Chicago
- October 29, 1898: Wisconsin defeated Minnesota, 29-0, at Madison, Wisconsin
- November 5, 1898: Chicago defeated Purdue, 17-0, at Chicago
- November 5, 1898: Michigan defeated Northwestern, 6-5, at Ann Arbor, Michigan
- November 12, 1898: Chicago defeated Wisconsin, 6-0, at Chicago
- November 12, 1898: Michigan defeated Illinois, 12-5, at Detroit
- November 12, 1898: Minnesota defeated Northwestern, 17-6, at Minneapolis
- November 24, 1898: Illinois defeated Minnesota, 11-10, at Champaign, Illinois
- November 24, 1898: Michigan defeated Chicago, 12-11, at Chicago
- November 24, 1898: Wisconsin defeated Northwestern, 47-0, at Evanston, Illinois

Notable non-conference games during the 1898 season included the following:

- October 8, 1898: Chicago defeated Iowa, 38–0, at Chicago
- October 8, 1898: Illinois lost to Notre Dame, 5–0, at Champaign, Illinois
- October 12, 1898: Michigan defeated Michigan Agricultural, 39–0, at Ann Arbor (first Michigan–Michigan State football rivalry game)
- October 18, 1898: Purdue defeated Haskell, 5–0, at Lawrence, Kansas
- October 22, 1898 Purdue defeated Haskell, 15–0, at West Lafayette, Indiana
- October 22, 1898: Minnesota lost to Iowa State, 6–0, at Minneapolis
- October 23, 1898: Michigan defeated Notre Dame, 23–0, at Ann Arbor, Michigan
- October 29, 1898: Michigan lost to Penn, 23–11, at Philadelphia
- November 5, 1898: Minnesota defeated North Dakota, 15–0, at Minneapolis
- November 12, 1898: Purdue defeated Indiana, 14–0, at West Lafayette, Indiana
- November 19, 1898: Illinois lost to Carlisle, 11–0, at Chicago

=== Bowl games ===
No bowl games were played during the 1898 season.

== All-Western players ==
=== Ends ===
- Neil Snow, Michigan (CW) (CFHOF)
- John W. F. Bennett, Michigan (CW)

=== Tackles ===
- Allen Steckle, Michigan (CW)
- Bothne, Northwestern (CW)

=== Guards ===
- Rogers, Chicago (CW)
- Bunge, Beloit (CW)

=== Centers ===
- William Cunningham, Michigan (CW)

=== Quarterbacks ===
- Walter S. Kennedy, Chicago (CW)

=== Halfbacks ===
- William Caley, Michigan (CW)
- F. L. Slaker, Chicago (CW)

=== Fullbacks ===
- Pat O'Dea, Wisconsin (CW) (CFHOF)
