= List of Auburn Tigers football seasons =

History of an American college sports program

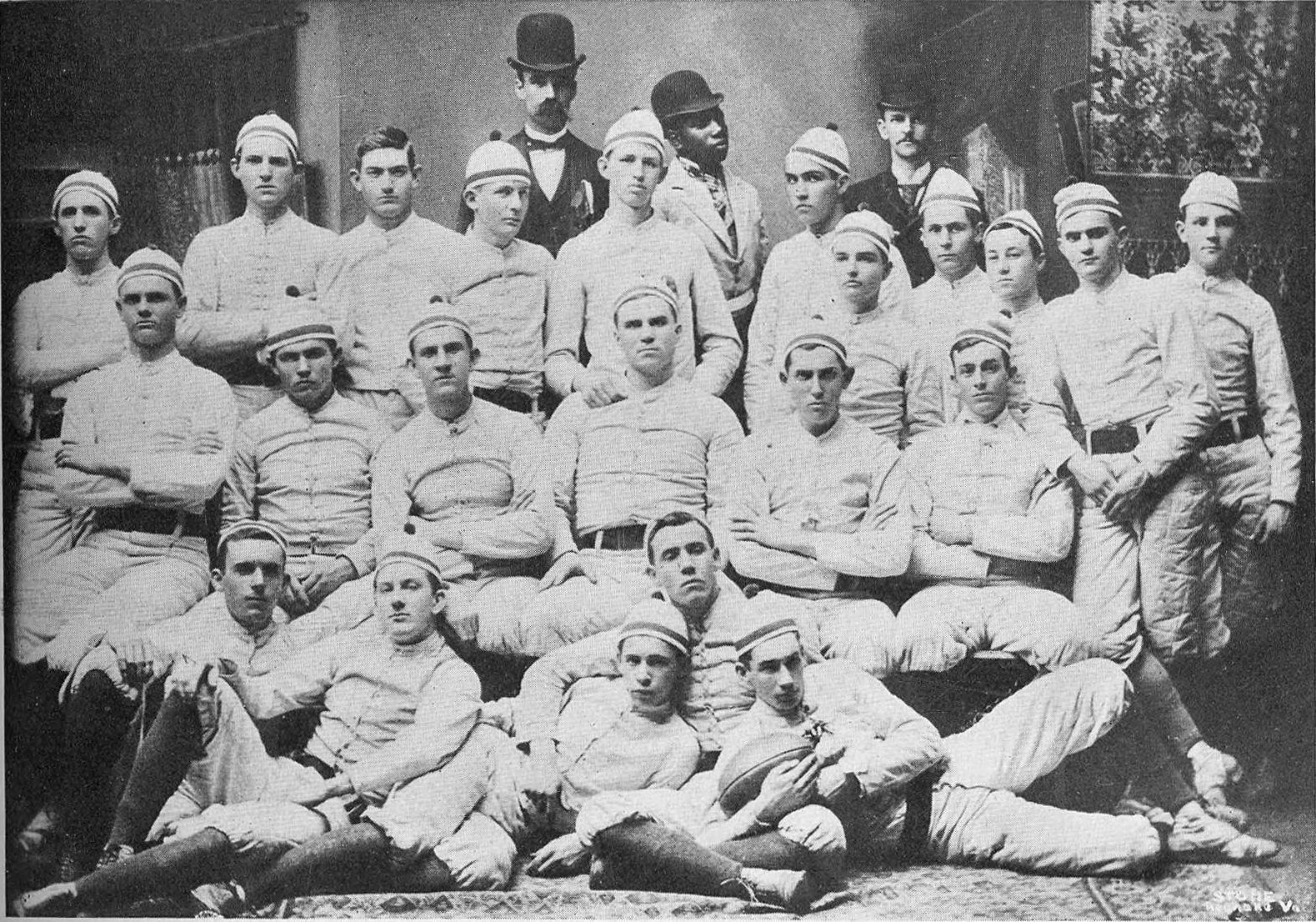
The spring 1892 football team of the Agricultural and Mechanical College of Alabama (now Auburn University) was the school's first.

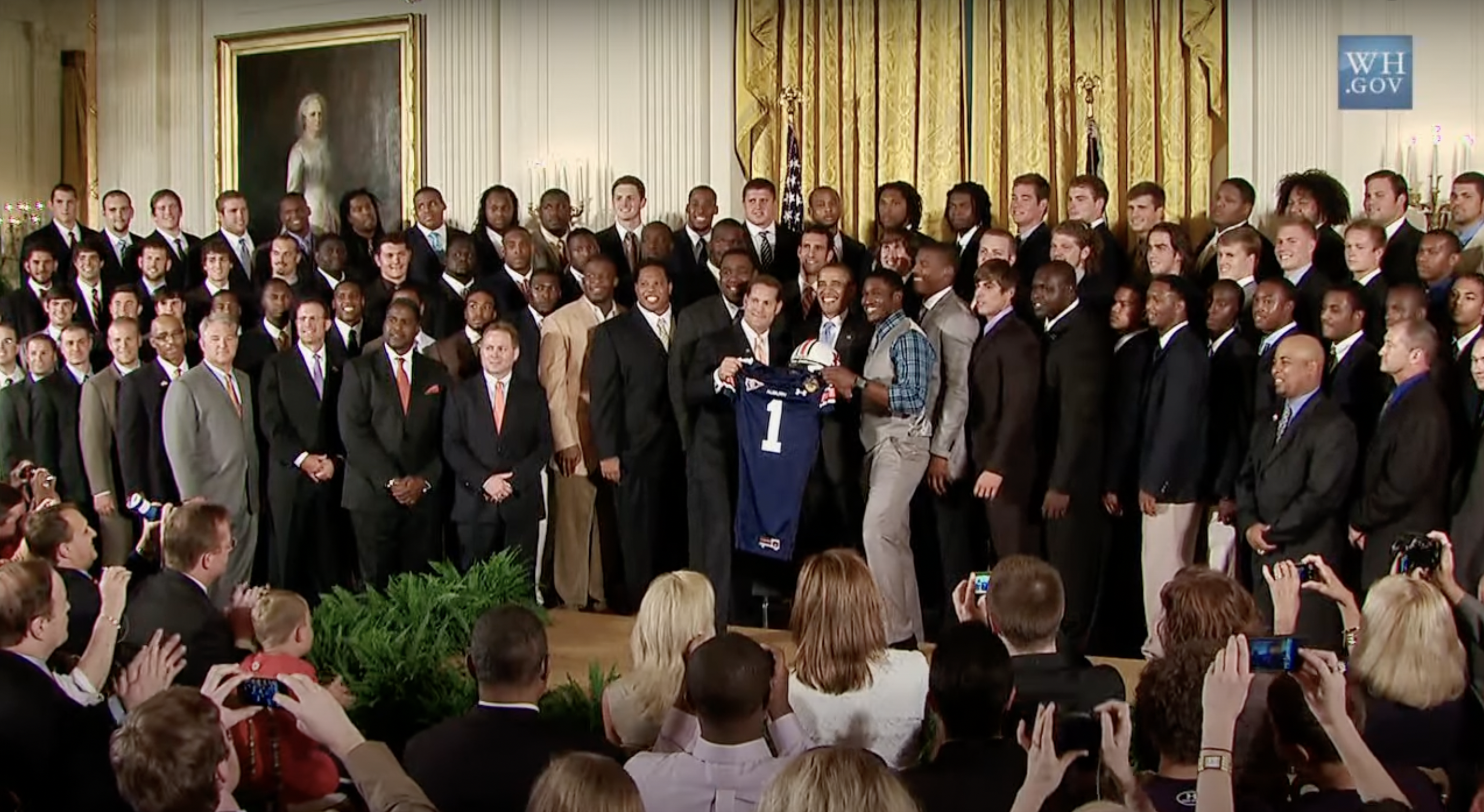
The 2010 Tigers at the White House

The Auburn Tigers college football team competes as part of the National Collegiate Athletic Association (NCAA) Division I Football Bowl Subdivision, representing Auburn University in the Western Division of the Southeastern Conference (SEC). Auburn has played their home games at Jordan–Hare Stadium in Auburn, Alabama since 1939. The Tigers have won nine national championships, completed 12 undefeated seasons, including seven perfect seasons, recorded 15 total conference championships, appeared in 41 post-season bowl games (winning 23), have finished first or tied for first in the SEC's Western Division nine times, and have represented the Western Division in the SEC Championship Game six times. The Associated Press (AP) ranks Auburn eleventh in all-time Final AP Poll appearances. With 733 wins, Auburn ranks 12th all-time in win–loss records in the NCAA Football Bowl Subdivision.

== Seasons ==
Year	Coach	Overall	Conference	Standing	Bowl/playoffs	Coaches^{#}	AP^{°}
George Petrie (Independent) (1892)
1892	George Petrie	2–2					
George Roy Harvey (Independent) (1893)
1893	George Roy Harvey (Note: D. M. Balliet coached and won one game in February 1893.)	3–0–2					
Forrest M. Hall (Independent) (1894)
1894	Forrest M. Hall	1–3					
John Heisman (Southern Intercollegiate Athletic Association) (1895–1899)
1895	John Heisman	2–1	2–1	3rd			
1896	John Heisman	3–1	3–1	4th			
1897	John Heisman	2–0–1	2–0–1	3rd			
1898	John Heisman	2–1	2–1	4th			
1899	John Heisman	3–1–1	2–1–1	6th			
Walter H. Watkins (Southern Intercollegiate Athletic Association) (1900–1901)
1900	Walter H. Watkins	4–0	3–0	T–1st			
1901	Walter H. Watkins	2–3–1	2–2–1	9th			
Ralph S. Kent (Southern Intercollegiate Athletic Association) (1902)
1902	Ralph S. Kent (Note: M. S. Harvey coached the last two games of the season and went 0–2.)	2–4–1	2–4–1	10th			
William Penn Bates (Southern Intercollegiate Athletic Association) (1903)
1903	William Penn Bates	4–3	2–3	10th			
Mike Donahue (Southern Intercollegiate Athletic Association) (1904–1906)
1904	Mike Donahue	5–0	4–0	T–1st			
1905	Mike Donahue	2–4	2–4	9th			
1906	Mike Donahue	1–5–1	0–5	16th			
Willis Kienholz (Southern Intercollegiate Athletic Association) (1907)
1907	Willis Kienholz	6–2–1	3–2–1	T–5th			
Mike Donahue (Southern Intercollegiate Athletic Association) (1908–1921)
1908	Mike Donahue	6–1	5–1	T–1st			
1909	Mike Donahue	5–2	3–2	6th			
1910	Mike Donahue	6–1	6–0	T–1st			
1911	Mike Donahue	4–2–1	3–0–1	2nd			
1912	Mike Donahue	6–1–1	4–1–1	3rd			
1913	Mike Donahue	8–0	7–0	1st			
1914	Mike Donahue	8–0–1	5–0–1	T–1st			
1915	Mike Donahue	6–2	4–2	7th			
1916	Mike Donahue	6–2	5–2	6th			
1917	Mike Donahue	6–2–1	5–1	T–2nd			
1918	Mike Donahue	2–5	0–2	11th			
1919	Mike Donahue	8–1	5–1	T–1st			
1920	Mike Donahue	7–2	3–2	8th			
1921	Mike Donahue	5–3	3–2	9th			
Mike Donahue (Southern Conference) (1922)
1922	Mike Donahue	8–2	2–1	T–6th			
Boozer Pitts (Southern Conference) (1923–1924)
1923	Boozer Pitts	3–3–3	0–1–3	14th			
1924	Boozer Pitts	4–4–1	2–4–1	17th			
Dave Morey (Southern Conference) (1925–1927)
1925	Dave Morey	5–3–1	3–2–1	9th			
1926	Dave Morey	5–4	3–3	T–10th			
1927	Dave Morey (Note: Boozer Pitts coached the last seven games of the season, going 0–4–2.)	0–7–2	0–6–1	22nd			
George Bohler (Southern Conference) (1928–1929)
1928	George Bohler	1–8	0–7	23rd			
1929	George Bohler (Note: Johnny Floyd coached the last four games of the season, going 0–4.)	2–7	0–7	23rd			
Chet A. Wynne (Southern Conference) (1930–1932)
1930	Chet A. Wynne	3–7	1–6	21st			
1931	Chet A. Wynne	5–3–1	3–3	T–8th			
1932	Chet A. Wynne	9–0–1	6–0–1	T–1st			
Chet A. Wynne (Southeastern Conference) (1933)
1933	Chet A. Wynne	5–5	2–2	T–6th			
Jack Meagher (Southeastern Conference) (1934–1942)
1934	Jack Meagher	2–8	1–6	10th			
1935	Jack Meagher	8–2	5–2	4th			
1936	Jack Meagher	7–2–2	4–1–1	3rd	T Bacardi		
1937	Jack Meagher	6–2–3	4–1–2	3rd	W Orange		
1938	Jack Meagher	4–5–1	3–3–1	T–7th			
1939	Jack Meagher	5–5–1	3–3–1	T–5th			
1940	Jack Meagher	6–4–1	3–2–1	5th			
1941	Jack Meagher	4–5–1	0–4–1	11th			
1942	Jack Meagher	6–4–1	3–3	7th			16
1943	No team	0–0					
Carl M. Voyles (Southeastern Conference) (1944–1947)
1944	Carl M. Voyles	4–4	0–4	11th			
1945	Carl M. Voyles	5–5	2–3	T–7th			
1946	Carl M. Voyles	4–6	1–5	10th			
1947	Carl M. Voyles	2–7	1–5	11th			
Earl Brown (Southeastern Conference) (1948–1950)
1948	Earl Brown	1–8–1	0–7	12th			
1949	Earl Brown	2–4–3	2–4–2	8th			
1950	Earl Brown	0–10	0–7	12th			
Ralph Jordan (Southeastern Conference) (1951–1975)
1951	Ralph Jordan	5–5	2–4	6th			
1952	Ralph Jordan	2–8	0–7	12th			
1953	Ralph Jordan	7–3–1	4–2–1	5th	L Gator		17
1954	Ralph Jordan	8–3	3–3	T–7th	W Gator		13
1955	Ralph Jordan	8–2–1	5–1–1	3rd	L Gator	8	8
1956	Ralph Jordan	7–3	4–3	5th			
1957	Ralph Jordan	10–0	6–0	1st		2	1
1958	Ralph Jordan	9–0–1	6–0–1	2nd		4	4
1959	Ralph Jordan	7–3	4–3	5th		15	
1960	Ralph Jordan	8–2	5–2	4th		14	13
1961	Ralph Jordan	6–4	3–4	7th			
1962	Ralph Jordan	6–3–1	4–3	6th			
1963	Ralph Jordan	9–2	6–1	2nd	L Orange	6	5
1964	Ralph Jordan	6–4	3–3	6th			
1965	Ralph Jordan	5–5–1	4–2–1	4th	L Liberty		
1966	Ralph Jordan	4–6	1–5	8th			
1967	Ralph Jordan	6–4	3–3	7th			
1968	Ralph Jordan	7–4	4–2	T–3rd	W Sun		16
1969	Ralph Jordan	8–3	5–2	T–3rd	L Astro-Bluebonnet	15	20
1970	Ralph Jordan	9–2	5–2	3rd	W Gator	9	10
1971	Ralph Jordan	9–2	5–1	T–2nd	L Sugar	5	12
1972	Ralph Jordan	10–1	6–1	2nd	W Gator	7	5
1973	Ralph Jordan	6–6	2–5	T–8th	L Sun		
1974	Ralph Jordan	10–2	4–2	T–2nd	W Gator	6	8
1975	Ralph Jordan	4–6–1	1–4–1	T–7th			
Doug Barfield (Southeastern Conference) (1976–1980)
1976	Doug Barfield	4–7	3–3	T–6th			
1977	Doug Barfield	6–5	5–1	3rd			
1978	Doug Barfield	6–4–1	3–2–1	3rd			
1979	Doug Barfield	8–3	4–2	T–3rd			16
1980	Doug Barfield	5–6	0–6	T–9th			
Pat Dye (Southeastern Conference) (1981–1992)
1981	Pat Dye	5–6	2–4	T–6th			
1982	Pat Dye	9–3	4–2	T–3rd	W Tangerine	14	14
1983	Pat Dye	11–1	6–0	1st	W Sugar	3	3
1984	Pat Dye	9–4	4–2	T–3rd	W Liberty	14	14
1985	Pat Dye	8–4	3–3	5th	L Cotton		
1986	Pat Dye	10–2	4–2	T–2nd	W Florida Citrus	8	6
1987	Pat Dye	9–1–2	5–0–1	1st	T Sugar	7	7
1988	Pat Dye	10–2	6–1	T–1st	L Sugar	7	8
1989	Pat Dye	10–2	6–1	T–1st	W Hall of Fame	6	6
1990	Pat Dye	8–3–1	4–2–1	4th	W Peach	19	19
1991	Pat Dye	5–6	2–5	8th			
1992	Pat Dye	5–5–1	2–5–1	5th (West)			
Terry Bowden (Southeastern Conference) (1993–1998)
1993	Terry Bowden	11–0	8–0	1st (Western) (Note: Due to NCAA probation, Auburn was banned from TV and post-season play, and suffered reduced scholarships. The post-season ban prevented Auburn from playing the SEC Championship and a bowl game.)			4
1994	Terry Bowden	9–1–1	6–1–1	2nd (Western)	(Note: Auburn returned to television this season, but was still serving a postseason ban that made them ineligible for a bowl game.)		9
1995	Terry Bowden	8–4	5–3	2nd (Western)	L Outback	21	22
1996	Terry Bowden	8–4	4–4	3rd (Western)	W Independence	25	24
1997	Terry Bowden	10–3	6–2	T–1st (Western)	W Peach	11	11
1998	Terry Bowden (Note: Bowden resigned after six games. Bill Oliver was appointed interim head coach and led Auburn for the remaining five games of the season, going 2–3.)	3–8	1–7	6th (Western)			
Tommy Tuberville (Southeastern Conference) (1999–2008)
1999	Tommy Tuberville	5–6	2–6	5th (Western)			
2000	Tommy Tuberville	9–4	5–2	1st (Western)	L Florida Citrus	20	18
2001	Tommy Tuberville	7–5	4–3	T–1st (Western)	L Peach		
2002	Tommy Tuberville	9–4	5–3	T–2nd (Western) (Note: In 2002, Alabama finished first in Western Division of the Southeastern Conference (SEC) with a conference record of 6–2, but was ineligible for the division title or postseason play as part of a penalty for National Collegiate Athletic Association (NCAA) violations. Auburn, Arkansas, and LSU tied for second place, each with a 5–3 mark in the conference, and were named co-champions. Arkansas was awarded a berth in the SEC Championship Game by virtue of their head-to-head wins over Auburn and LSU.)	W Capital One	16	14
2003	Tommy Tuberville	8–5	5–3	3rd (Western)	W Music City		
2004	Tommy Tuberville	13–0	8–0	1st (Western)	W Sugar^{†}	2	2
2005	Tommy Tuberville	9–3	7–1	T–1st (Western)	L Capital One	14	14
2006	Tommy Tuberville	11–2	6–2	T–2nd (Western)	W Cotton	8	9
2007	Tommy Tuberville	9–4	5–3	2nd (Western)	W Chick-fil-A	14	15
2008	Tommy Tuberville	5–7	2–6	T–4th (Western)			
Gene Chizik (Southeastern Conference) (2009–2012)
2009	Gene Chizik	8–5	3–5	T–4th (Western)	W Outback		
2010	Gene Chizik	14–0	8–0	1st (Western)	W BCS NCG^{†}	1	1
2011	Gene Chizik	8–5	4–4	4th (Western)	W Chick-fil-A		
2012	Gene Chizik	3–9	0–8	7th (Western)			
Gus Malzahn (Southeastern Conference) (2013–2020)
2013	Gus Malzahn	12–2	7–1	T–1st (Western)	L BCS NCG^{†}	2	2
2014	Gus Malzahn	8–5	4–4	T–4th (Western)	L Outback	23	22
2015	Gus Malzahn	7–6	2–6	7th (Western)	W Birmingham		
2016	Gus Malzahn	8–5	5–3	T–2nd (Western)	L Sugar^{†}	22	24
2017	Gus Malzahn	10–4	7–1	T–1st (Western)	L Peach^{†}	12	10
2018	Gus Malzahn	8–5	3–5	5th (Western)	W Music City		
2019	Gus Malzahn	9–4	5–3	3rd (Western)	L Outback	14	14
2020	Gus Malzahn (Note: On December 13, 2020, head coach Gus Malzahn was fired after eight years. Kevin Steele, defensive coordinator, was designated to serve as the Tigers' interim coach for the Citrus Bowl.)	6–5	6–4	3rd (Western)	L Citrus		
Bryan Harsin (Southeastern Conference) (2021–2022)
2021	Bryan Harsin	6–7	3–5	T–6th (Western)	L Birmingham		
2022	Bryan Harsin (Note: The Tigers were led by second-year head coach Bryan Harsin until his firing on October 31. Later that day, former Auburn running backs coach Cadillac Williams was appointed interim head coach for the remainder of the season.)	5–7	2–6	T–5th (Western)			
Hugh Freeze (Southeastern Conference) (2023–present)
2023	Hugh Freeze	6–7	3–5	5th (Western)	L Music City		
2024	Hugh Freeze	5–7	2–6	14th (SEC)			
2025	Hugh Freeze	5–7	1–7	T–13th (SEC)			
Total:		807–481–47					
National championship Conference title Conference division title or championship game berth
^{#}Rankings from final Coaches Poll.
