= Northern Illinois College of Law =

Northern Illinois College of Law may refer to:

- Northern Illinois University College of Law in Dekalb, Illinois
- Dixon College in Dixon, Illinois, which also used the name Northern Illinois College of Law
