= 1898 Chicago Maroons football team =

American college football season

1898 Chicago Maroons football
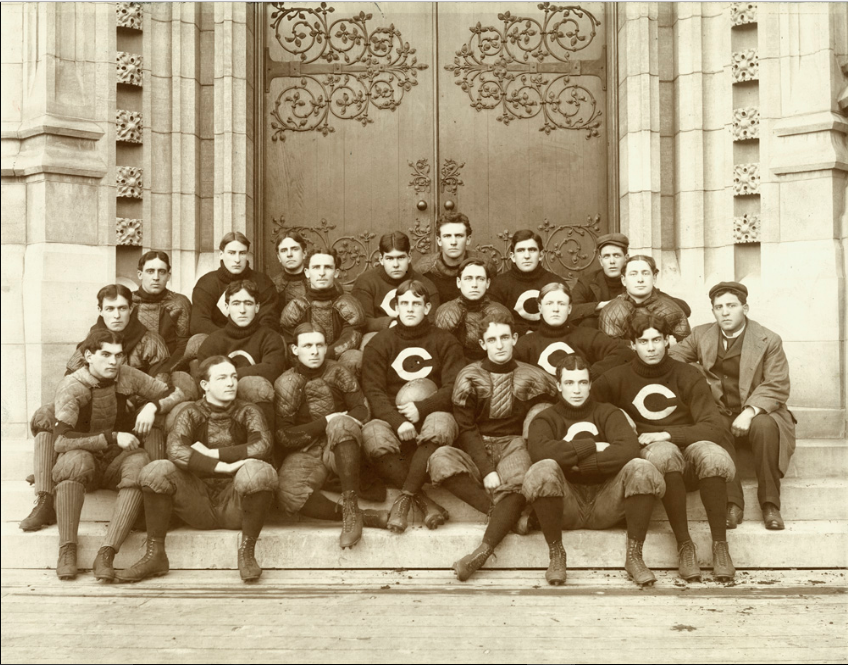
- Conference: Western Conference
- Record: 14–2–1 (3–1 Western)
- Head coach: Amos Alonzo Stagg (7th season)
- Base defense: 7–2–2
- Captain: Walter S. Kennedy
- Home stadium: Marshall Field

1898 Western Conference football standings
	Conf.					Overall
Team	W		L		T	W		L		T
Michigan $	3	–	0	–	0	10	–	0	–	0
Chicago	3	–	1	–	0	14	–	2	–	1
Wisconsin	2	–	1	–	0	9	–	1	–	0
Illinois	1	–	1	–	0	4	–	5	–	0
Minnesota	1	–	2	–	0	4	–	5	–	0
Purdue	0	–	1	–	0	3	–	3	–	0
Northwestern	0	–	4	–	0	9	–	4	–	1
$ – Conference champion

The 1898 Chicago Maroons football team represented the University of Chicago during the 1898 Western Conference football season. This was the first known year that the Chicago football team used the wishbone-C logo.

== Schedule ==
Date	Opponent	Site	Result	Attendance	Source
September 10	Englewood HS*	Marshall Field; Chicago, IL	W 14–0		
September 14	Northwest Division HS*	Marshall Field; Chicago, IL	W 18–0		
September 16	Englewood HS*	Marshall Field; Chicago, IL	T 0–0		
September 17	Northwest Division HS*	Marshall Field; Chicago, IL	W 9–0		
September 21	Austin HS*	Marshall Field; Chicago, IL	W 14–8		
September 22	Hyde Park HS*	Marshall Field; Chicago, IL	W 20–0		
September 24	Knox (IL)*	Marshall Field; Chicago, IL	W 22–0		
September 28	Rush Medical*	Marshall Field; Chicago, IL	W 8–0		
October 1	Monmouth (IL)*	Marshall Field; Chicago, IL	W 24–0		
October 5	Physicians & Surgeons*	Marshall Field; Chicago, IL	W 22–0		
October 8	Iowa*	Marshall Field; Chicago, IL	W 38–0		
October 15	Beloit*	Marshall Field; Chicago, IL	W 21–0		
October 22	Northwestern	Marshall Field; Chicago, IL	W 34–5	5,000	
October 29	at Penn*	Franklin Field; Philadelphia, PA	L 11–23		
November 5	Purdue	Marshall Field; Chicago, IL (rivalry)	W 17–0	1,000	
November 12	Wisconsin	Marshall Field; Chicago, IL	W 6–0	10,000	
November 24	Michigan	Marshall Field; Chicago, IL (rivalry)	L 11–12	12,000	
*Non-conference game

== Roster ==
Player	Position
Walter Scott Kennedy (captain)	quarterback
Orville Silvester Burnett	left guard
Walter James Cavanagh	center
Maurice Gordon Clarke	left halfback
Ralph C. Hamill	right end
James Ronald Henry	left halfback, left end
Clarence Bert Herschberger	right halfback
Clarence James Rogers	right guard
Walter Joseph Schmahl	left end
Frank Louis Slaker	fullback
Kellogg Speed	center
Jonathan Edward Webb	right tackle
Theron Winfred	left tackle
Edwin George Allen	substitute
Bert James Cassels	substitute
Mark Asa Cleveland	substitute
Joseph Chalmers Ewing	substitute
Peter Knolla	substitute
Hiram Boardman Conibear	trainer

- Head coach: Amos Alonzo Stagg (7th year at Chicago)
