= 1898 Northwestern Purple football team =

American college football season

1898 Northwestern Purple football
- Conference: Western Conference
- Record: 9–4–1 (0–4 Western)
- Head coach: W. H. Bannard (1st season)
- Captain: Clarence Thorne
- Home stadium: Sheppard Field

1898 Western Conference football standings
	Conf.					Overall
Team	W		L		T	W		L		T
Michigan $	3	–	0	–	0	10	–	0	–	0
Chicago	3	–	1	–	0	14	–	2	–	1
Wisconsin	2	–	1	–	0	9	–	1	–	0
Illinois	1	–	1	–	0	4	–	5	–	0
Minnesota	1	–	2	–	0	4	–	5	–	0
Purdue	0	–	1	–	0	3	–	3	–	0
Northwestern	0	–	4	–	0	9	–	4	–	1
$ – Conference champion

The 1898 Northwestern Purple team represented Northwestern University during the 1898 Western Conference football season. In their first and only year under head coach W. H. Bannard, the Purple compiled a 9–4–1 record (0–4 against Western Conference opponents) and finished in last place in the Western Conference. The team lost all four of its games against Western Conference opponents (Chicago, Michigan, Minnesota and Wisconsin) by a combined total of 104 to 16.

== Schedule ==
Date	Opponent	Site	Result	Attendance	Source
September 21	Northwest Division High School*	Sheppard Field; Evanston, IL	W 34–0		
September 24	Englewood High School*	Sheppard Field; Evanston, IL	W 22–0		
September 28	Hyde Park High School*	Sheppard Field; Evanston, IL	W 18–0		
October 1	Dixon*	Sheppard Field; Evanston, IL	W 57–0		
October 8	Beloit*	Sheppard Field; Evanston, IL	W 17–11		
October 12	Hahnemann Medical*	Sheppard Field; Evanston, IL	W 22–6		
October 15	Chicago Physicians and Surgeons*	Sheppard Field; Evanston, IL	W 11–2		
October 18	Chicago Athletic Association*	Sheppard Field; Evanston, IL	W 4–0		
October 22	at Chicago	Marshall Field; Chicago, IL	L 5–34	5,000	
October 29	Lake Forest*	Sheppard Field; Evanston, IL	W 27–0		
November 5	Michigan	Sheppard Field; Evanston, IL (rivalry)	L 5–6		
November 12	at Minnesota	Athletic Park; Minneapolis, MN	L 6–17	4,000	
November 19	Armour Institute*	Sheppard Field; Evanston, IL	T 0–0		
November 24	Wisconsin	Sheppard Field; Evanston, IL	L 0–47	2,000	
*Non-conference game
