= 1898 Wisconsin Badgers football team =

American college football season

1898 Wisconsin Badgers football
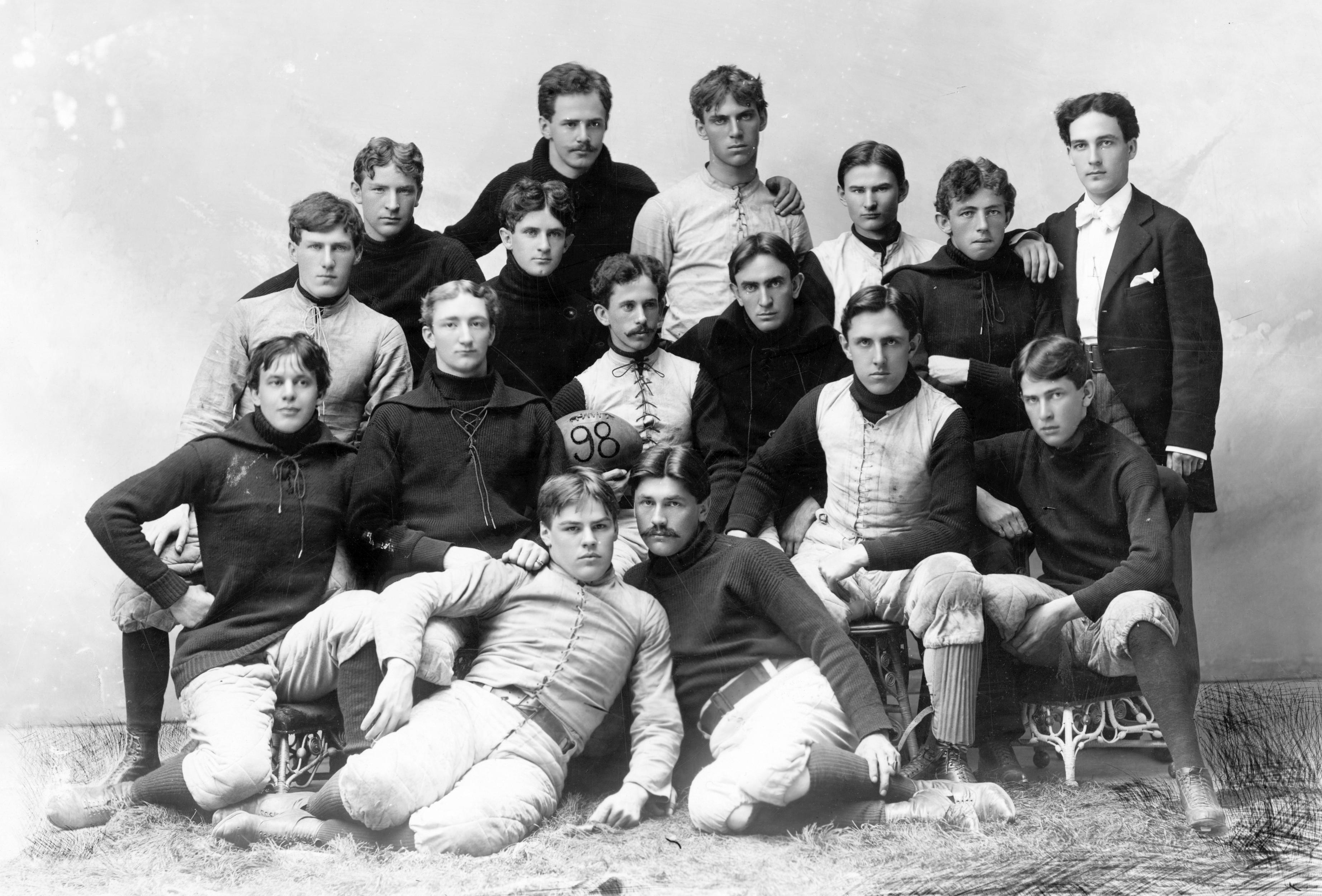
- Conference: Western Conference
- Record: 9–1 (2–1 Western)
- Head coach: Philip King (3rd season)
- Captain: Pat O'Dea
- Home stadium: Randall Field

1898 Western Conference football standings
	Conf.					Overall
Team	W		L		T	W		L		T
Michigan $	3	–	0	–	0	10	–	0	–	0
Chicago	3	–	1	–	0	14	–	2	–	1
Wisconsin	2	–	1	–	0	9	–	1	–	0
Illinois	1	–	1	–	0	4	–	5	–	0
Minnesota	1	–	2	–	0	4	–	5	–	0
Purdue	0	–	1	–	0	3	–	3	–	0
Northwestern	0	–	4	–	0	9	–	4	–	1
$ – Conference champion

The 1898 Wisconsin Badgers football team represented the University of Wisconsin in the 1898 Western Conference football season. Led by third-year head coach Philip King, the Badgers compiled an overall record of 9–1 with a mark of 2–1 in conference play, placing third in the Western Conference. The team's captain was Pat O'Dea.

== Schedule ==
Date	Opponent	Site	Result	Attendance	Source
October 1	Ripon*	Randall Field; Madison, WI	W 52–0		
October 5	Madison High School*	Randall Field; Madison, WI	W 21–0		
October 8	Dixon College*	Randall Field; Madison, WI	W 76–0		
October 15	Rush Medical*	Randall Field; Madison, WI	W 42–0		
October 22	vs. Beloit	Athletic Park; Milwaukee, WI	W 17–0	6,000	
October 29	Minnesota	Randall Field; Madison, WI (rivalry)	W 29–0	1,200	
November 5	Wisconsin alumni*	Randall Field; Madison, WI	W 12–11		
November 12	at Chicago	Marshall Field; Chicago, IL	L 0–6	10,000	
November 19	Whitewater Normal*	Randall Field; Madison, WI	W 12–0		
November 24	at Northwestern	Sheppard Field; Evanston, IL	W 47–0	2,000	
*Non-conference game
