= M. P. Randolph =

American football player and coach (1868–1926)

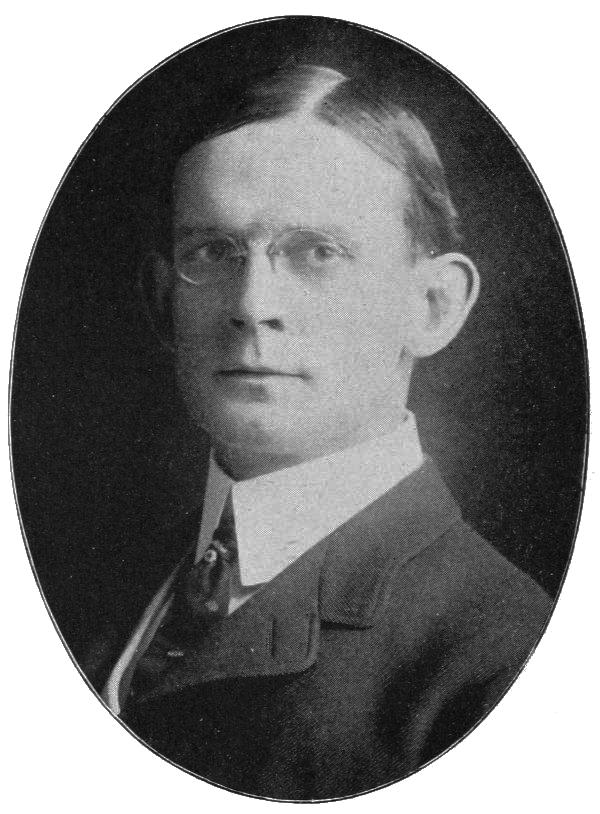

Biographical details
- Born: September 4, 1868; Frenchtown, New Jersey, U.S.
- Died: August 25, 1926 (aged 57); Las Vegas, Nevada, U.S.

Playing career
- 1889: Lehigh
- 1892: Princeton
- 1893: Columbia Athletic Club
- 1894: Allegheny Athletic Association
- 1895–1898: Duquesne Country & Athletic Club
- Position: End

Coaching career (HC unless noted)
- 1893: Purdue
- 1893: Columbia Athletic Club (co-coach)

Head coaching record
- Overall: 4–0 (college)

Accomplishments and honors

Championships
- Indiana Intercollegiate Athletic Association (1893)

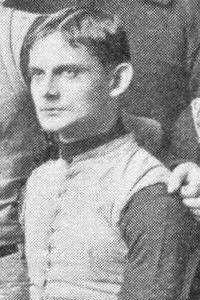
Randolph at Princeton, 1892

Mervyn Paul Randolph (September 4, 1868 – August 25, 1926) was an American football player and coach. He served as head football coach at Purdue University for part of the 1893 season, helping the team toward an eventual conference championship. He had played at Princeton University in 1892, and later played for club and professional teams including the Allegheny Athletic Association and the Duquesne Country and Athletic Club.

== Early life and college ==
Randolph was born on September 4, 1868, in Frenchtown, New Jersey. After schooling at Blair Academy, he enrolled at Lehigh University and as a freshman saw limited action on the football team. In his sophomore year he transferred to Princeton, where, as a senior in 1892, he played varsity football as an end.

== College coaching ==
In 1893, D. M. Balliet, Randolph's former teammate at both Lehigh and Princeton, was appointed head football coach at Purdue University, but returned to Princeton as a player before the season started. Randolph arrived as Purdue's new head coach by September 25. The Lafayette Daily Courier stated that he came highly recommended by Princeton team captain Thomas Trenchard, and that "as a coacher he ranks very high, being an expert in all the new tactics." Randolph stayed until November 6, when he departed for Washington, D.C. to join the football team of the Columbia Athletic Club. During his tenure at Purdue, his team played and won the first four games of its eight-game season. The 1893 Boilermakers finished with a 5–2–1 record and were champions of the Indiana Intercollegiate Athletic Association.

== Club football ==
In his partial 1893 season with the Columbia Athletic Club, Randolph played end while sharing coaching duties with halfback Jake Camp. The Washington Evening Star credited the two coaches with bringing about a remarkable improvement in the team's play.

Randolph continued his football career in the Pittsburgh area, playing for the Allegheny Athletic Association in 1894 then spending the next four seasons with the Duquesne Country and Athletic Club. In Randolph's final season with Duquesne in 1898, the team was openly professional.

== Later years ==
While in Pittsburgh, Randolph worked as an electrical engineer for the Westinghouse Electric & Manufacturing Company. He left for New York in December 1898 for a position in the company's sales department. By 1903, he had become manager of Westinghouse's Seattle office. He later pursued engineering and mining ventures in the American West. During World War I, he entered service with the U.S. Army Ordnance Department, and in 1920, was commissioned in the Regular Army as major of ordnance. Following his discharge in 1922, he returned to the West, where he engaged in mining and raising cattle. He died in Las Vegas, on August 25, 1926.

== Head coaching record ==
=== College ===
Year	Team	Overall	Conference	Standing	Bowl/playoffs
Purdue Boilermakers (Indiana Intercollegiate Athletic Association) (1893)
1893	Purdue	4–0	3–0	1st	
Purdue:		4–0	3–0		
Total:		4–0			
National championship Conference title Conference division title or championship game berth
