= 1898 Illinois Fighting Illini football team =

American college football season

1898 Illinois Fighting Illini football
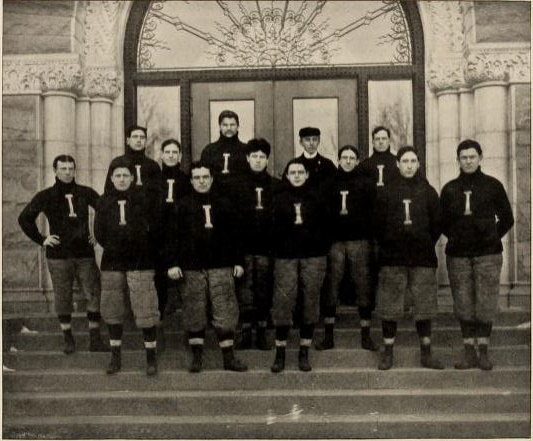
- Conference: Western Conference
- Record: 4–5 (1–1 Western)
- Head coach: George Huff (4th season)
- Captain: Arthur R. Johnston
- Home stadium: Illinois Field

1898 Western Conference football standings
	Conf.					Overall
Team	W		L		T	W		L		T
Michigan $	3	–	0	–	0	10	–	0	–	0
Chicago	3	–	1	–	0	14	–	2	–	1
Wisconsin	2	–	1	–	0	9	–	1	–	0
Illinois	1	–	1	–	0	4	–	5	–	0
Minnesota	1	–	2	–	0	4	–	5	–	0
Purdue	0	–	1	–	0	3	–	3	–	0
Northwestern	0	–	4	–	0	9	–	4	–	1
$ – Conference champion

The 1898 Illinois Fighting Illini football team was an American football team that represented the University of Illinois during the 1898 Western Conference football season. In their fourth season under head coach George Huff, the Illini compiled a 4–5 record and finished in fourth place in the Western Conference. Fullback Arthur R. Johnston was the team captain.

== Schedule ==
Date	Opponent	Site	Result	Attendance	Source
September 28	Illinois Wesleyan*	Illinois Field; Champaign, IL	W 18–0		
October 1	Chicago Physicians and Surgeons*	Illinois Field; Champaign, IL	L 6–11		
October 8	Notre Dame*	Illinois Field; Champaign, IL	L 0–5		
October 15	DePauw*	Illinois Field; Champaign, IL	W 16–0		
October 22	vs. Illinois alumni*	Illinois Field; Champaign, IL	W 10–6		
November 4	vs. Illinois alumni*	Illinois Field; Champaign, IL	L 17–23		
November 12	vs. Michigan	Detroit Athletic Club; Detroit, MI (rivalry)	L 5–12		
November 19	vs. Carlisle*	Jackson Park; Chicago, IL	L 0–11	2,000	
November 24	Minnesota	Illinois Field; Champaign, IL	W 11–10		
*Non-conference game

== Roster ==
Adsit, Bertram W. RE/LE; Clayton, Clark M. LT/RT; Cook, James F. HB/QB; Hall, Arthur R. HB; Johnston, Arthur R. FB (captain); King, J.W. LG; Lindgren, Justa M. LE/RE/LHB; Lowenthal, Fred LG/RG/LT; Martin, Robert LE/RE/RHB; McCormick, R.C. RT; McLane, E.C. C; Wilmarth, Geo H. QB	Substitutes: Atwood, J.R. FB; Brundage, Martin D. HB; Burkland, Theo L. FB; Coffman, H.A. FG; Elkas, I. LG; Francis, Frank D. LE/RE; Hughes, A.H. HB/FB; Jutton, Lee HB/FB; Kuhn, L. T/LG; Moran, M.A. HB; Murphy QB; Swift, C.C. LT; White, J.D. G; Wright, S.W. RE
