= 1893 Purdue Boilermakers football team =

American college football season

1893 Purdue Boilermakers football
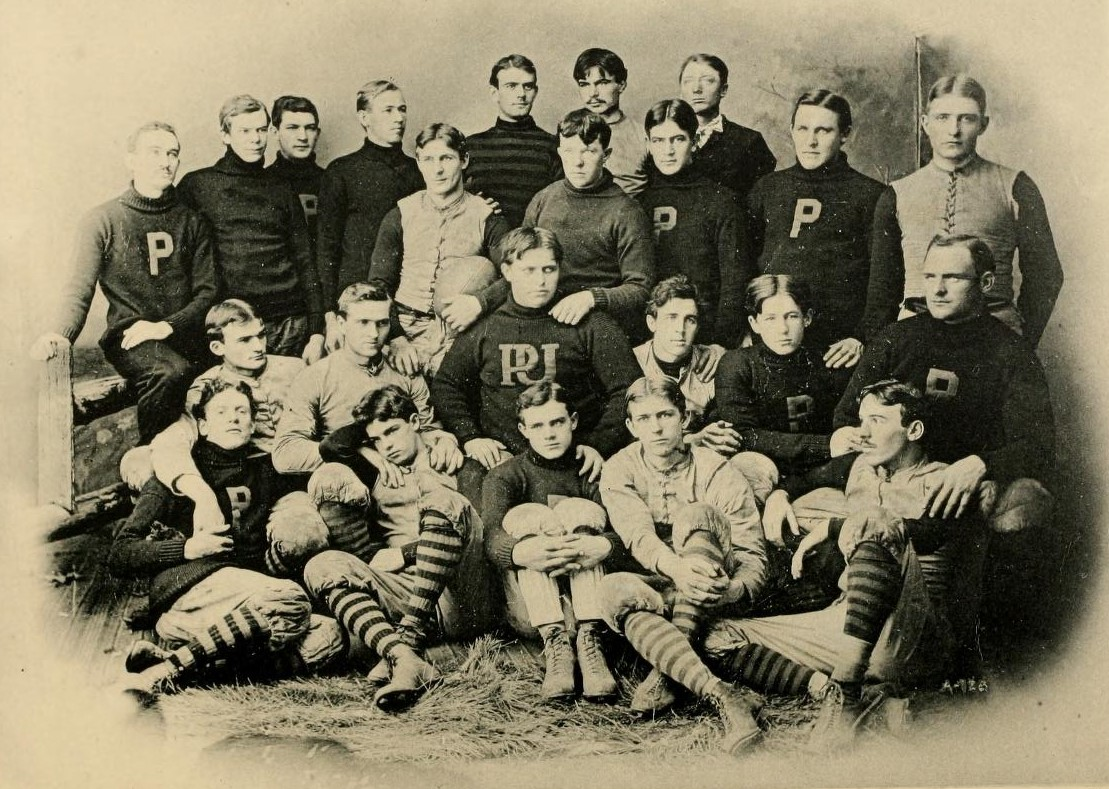

IIAA champion
- Conference: Indiana Intercollegiate Athletic Association
- Record: 5–2–1 (4–0 IIAA)
- Head coach: D. M. Balliet (1st season); M. P. Randolph; Edward Seixas
- Captain: William P. Finney
- Home stadium: Stuart Field

1893 Indiana Intercollegiate Athletic Association football standings
	Conf.					Overall
Team	W		L		T	W		L		T
Purdue $	4	–	0	–	0	5	–	2	–	1
DePauw	3	–	1	–	0	6	–	3	–	0
Butler	2	–	2	–	0	4	–	2	–	0
Wabash	1	–	3	–	0	2	–	4	–	0
Indiana	0	–	4	–	0	1	–	4	–	1
$ – Conference champion

The 1893 Purdue Boilermakers football team was an American football team that represented Purdue University during the 1893 college football season. Led by three successive head coaches, the team compiled a 5–2–1 record and outscored their opponents by a total of 334 to 144. William P. Finney was the team captain.

== Schedule ==
Date	Opponent	Site	Result	Attendance	Source
October 14	Indiana	Stuart Field; West Lafayette, IN (rivalry)	W 64–0		
October 21	Butler	Stuart Field; West Lafayette, IN	W 96–0	1,200	
October 25	Chicago*	Stuart Field; West Lafayette, IN (rivalry)	W 20–10		
November 4	Wabash	Stuart Field; West Lafayette, IN	W 48–8		
November 11	Michigan*	Stuart Field; West Lafayette, IN	L 8–46	2,000	
November 18	at Wisconsin*	Randall Field; Madison, WI	L 30–36		
November 25	Illinois*	Stuart Field; West Lafayette, IN (rivalry)	T 26–26		
November 30	vs. DePauw	Indianapolis, IN	W 42–18		
*Non-conference game

== Personnel ==
=== Head coaches ===
Princeton center D. M. Balliet arrived as Purdue coach by mid-September but departed later that month, before any games were played, to take back his old position on the Princeton team. He was replaced by M. P. Randolph, also of Princeton, who led the Boilermakers until leaving on November 6 to coach and play for the Columbia Athletic Club of Washington, DC. Edward Seixas of the Chicago Athletic Association took charge of the team for its last two games.

The Purdue yearbook listed all three men as coaches; however, the school's football media guide credits only Balliet.

=== Roster ===
- Bill Aldrich, QB
- Harry Bushman, HB-QB
- Leon Crowell, E
- Guy Deardorf, C
- Larry Downs, G-T
- Bill Finney, T-HB
- A. L. Fulkerson, C-G
- Dwight Gerber, T-QB
- H. W. Griffith, E
- Alpha Jamison, HB-FB-QB
- Joe Kerchival, G
- S. M. Kintner, QB
- Bill Koberlin, G
- Jesse Little, G-T
- Leon McAllister, E
- Nelson Olin, E
- Ed Oliver, E
- Ed Patterson, HB
- C. H. Robertson, T-G-C
- Babe Turner, G
- E. A. Van Volkenberg, FB
