= 1898 Purdue Boilermakers football team =

American college football season

1898 Purdue Boilermakers football
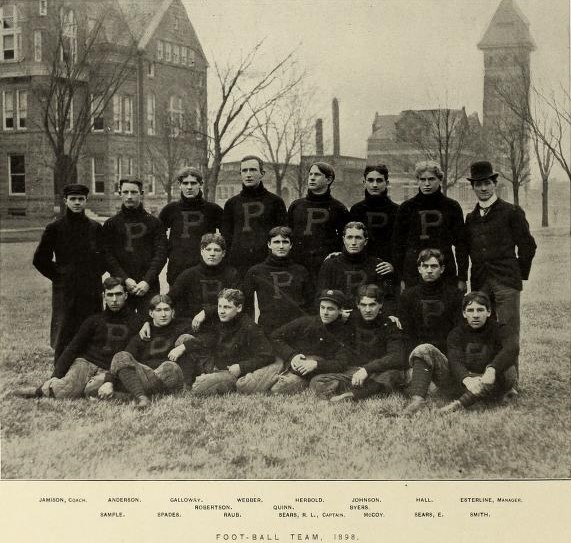
- Conference: Western Conference
- Record: 3–3 (0–1 Western)
- Head coach: Alpha Jamison (1st season)
- Captain: R. L. Spears
- Home stadium: Stuart Field

1898 Western Conference football standings
	Conf.					Overall
Team	W		L		T	W		L		T
Michigan $	3	–	0	–	0	10	–	0	–	0
Chicago	3	–	1	–	0	14	–	2	–	1
Wisconsin	2	–	1	–	0	9	–	1	–	0
Illinois	1	–	1	–	0	4	–	5	–	0
Minnesota	1	–	2	–	0	4	–	5	–	0
Purdue	0	–	1	–	0	3	–	3	–	0
Northwestern	0	–	4	–	0	9	–	4	–	1
$ – Conference champion

The 1898 Purdue Boilermakers football team was an American football team that represented Purdue University during the 1898 Western Conference football season. The Boilermakers compiled a 3–3 record and outscored their opponents by a total of 37 to 33 in their first season under head coach Alpha Jamison. R. L. Spears was the team captain.

== Schedule ==
Date	Time	Opponent	Site	Result	Attendance	Source
October 8		Purdue alumni*	Stuart Field; West Lafayette, IN	L 0–6		
October 18	2:30 p.m.	vs. Haskell*	Newby Oval; Indianapolis, IN	W 5–0		
October 22		Haskell*	Stuart Field; West Lafayette, IN	W 16–0		
November 5		at Chicago	Marshall Field; Chicago, IL (rivalry)	L 0–17	1,000	
November 12		Indiana*	Stuart Field; West Lafayette, IN (rivalry)	W 14–0		
November 24		Oberlin*	Stuart Field; West Lafayette, IN	L 0–10		
*Non-conference game

== Roster ==
- A. W. Anderson, T
- W. M. Benson
- Tom Butterworth, C
- H. L. Byers, HB
- A. Dushane, G
- W. Galloway
- J. J. Hall
- Fred Herbold
- L. F. Johnson
- F. J. McCoy, HB
- Charlie Quinn
- J. W. Raub
- C. T. Rich, T
- Edward C. Robertson, QB-HB
- C. S. Sample
- Edward Sears
- R. L. Sears, QB
- Alex Smith, T
- M. H. Spades, E
- R. I. Webber
