= 1898 Minnesota Golden Gophers football team =

American college football season

1898 Minnesota Golden Gophers football
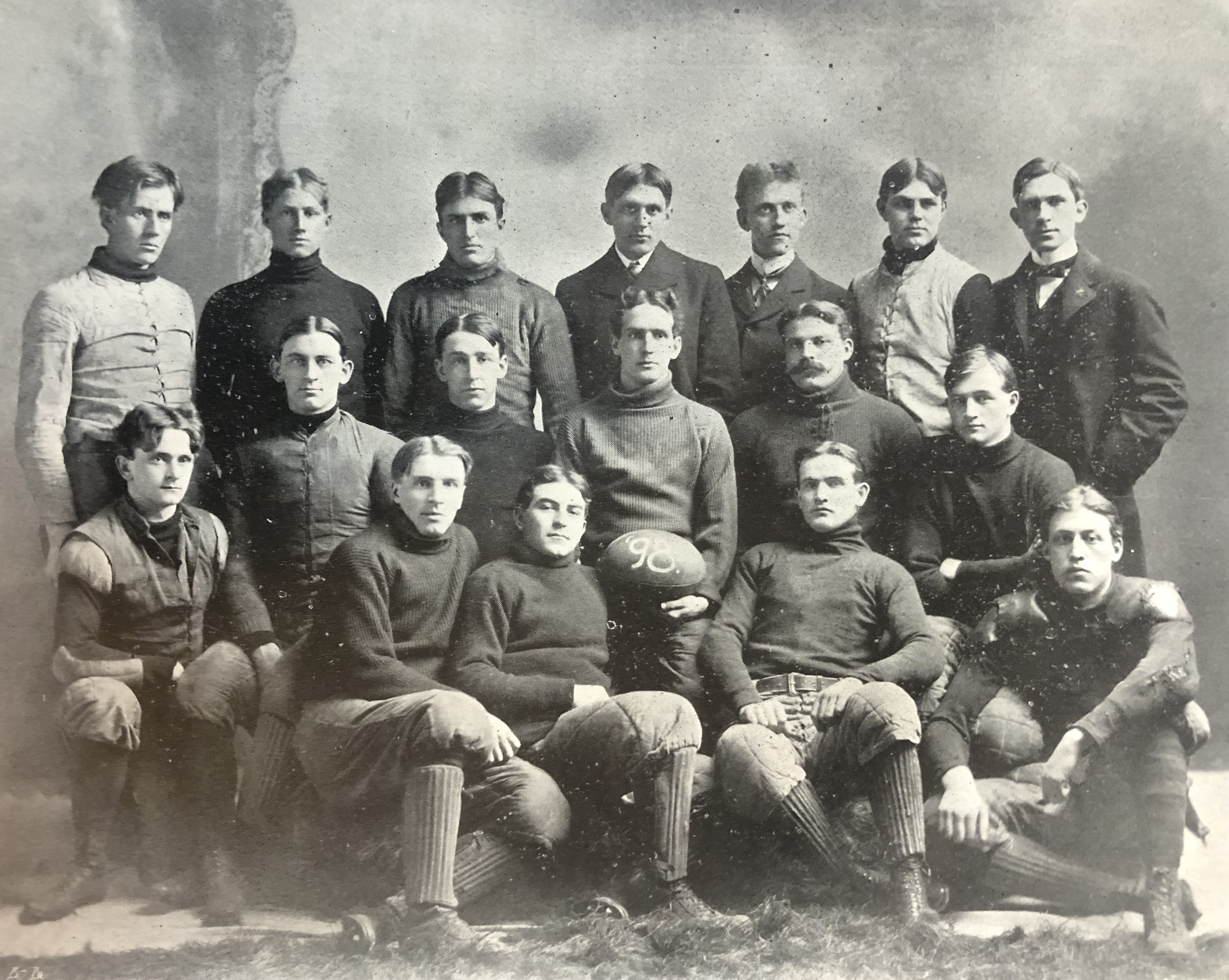
- Conference: Western Conference
- Record: 4–5 (1–2 Western)
- Head coach: Jack Minds (1st season)
- Captain: George E. Cole
- Home stadium: Athletic Park

1898 Western Conference football standings
	Conf.					Overall
Team	W		L		T	W		L		T
Michigan $	3	–	0	–	0	10	–	0	–	0
Chicago	3	–	1	–	0	14	–	2	–	1
Wisconsin	2	–	1	–	0	9	–	1	–	0
Illinois	1	–	1	–	0	4	–	5	–	0
Minnesota	1	–	2	–	0	4	–	5	–	0
Purdue	0	–	1	–	0	3	–	3	–	0
Northwestern	0	–	4	–	0	9	–	4	–	1
$ – Conference champion

The 1898 Minnesota Golden Gophers football team represented the University of Minnesota in the 1898 Western Conference football season. In their first and only season under head coach Jack Minds, the Golden Gophers compiled a 4–5 record (1–2 against Western Conference opponents), finished in fifth place in the conference, and outscored their opponents by a combined total of 92 to 73.

The 1898 season for Minnesota was one of adversity, including bad weather and a mid-season injury to the team's captain. Coach Jack Minds was a fullback and kicker at the University of Pennsylvania.

On Thanksgiving Day 1898, Minnesota and Illinois played a football game for the first time in the two programs' history. A big storm had come through the previous day, but John Pillsbury (the student manager) put together a crew and worked overnight using horse-drawn plows to clear the field. The game itself was delayed several times when the ball was lost in snow drifts on the side of the field and the temperature fell to about 10 below zero when the game was called at noon. Illinois won the game 11–10.

== Schedule ==
Date	Time	Opponent	Site	Result	Attendance	Source
October 1		Carleton*	Minneapolis, MN	W 32–0		
October 5	3:35 p.m.	Alumni*	Minneapolis, MN	L 0–5		
October 8		Rush Medical*	Athletic Park; Minneapolis, MN	W 12–0		
October 15		Grinnell*	Minneapolis, MN	L 6–16		
October 22		Iowa State*	Minneapolis, MN	L 0–6		
October 29		at Wisconsin	Randall Field; Madison, WI (rivalry)	L 0–29	1,200	
November 5		North Dakota*	Minneapolis, MN	W 15–0		
November 12		Northwestern	Minneapolis, MN	W 17–6	4,000	
November 24		Illinois	Minneapolis, MN	L 10–11		
*Non-conference game

== Personnel ==
=== Players ===
- Aune - guard
- Bernhagen - halfback
- Cameron - halfback
- Kienholtz - quarterback
- Nicoulin - tackle
- Otte - tackle
- Page - center
- Parry - guard
- Harry "Buz" Scandrett - captain, end, and elected captain for 1899
- Shepley - fullback
- von Schlegell - end

=== Staff ===
- Jack Minds - coach
- John Wirtensohn - trainer
- G.S. Phelps - football manager
