= 1893 Indiana Hoosiers football team =

American college football season

1893 Indiana Hoosiers football
- Conference: Indiana Intercollegiate Athletic Association
- Record: 1–4–1 (0–4 IIAA)
- Head coach: None
- Captain: Kenneth Brewer

1893 Indiana Intercollegiate Athletic Association football standings
	Conf.					Overall
Team	W		L		T	W		L		T
Purdue $	4	–	0	–	0	5	–	2	–	1
DePauw	3	–	1	–	0	6	–	3	–	0
Butler	2	–	2	–	0	4	–	2	–	0
Wabash	1	–	3	–	0	2	–	4	–	0
Indiana	0	–	4	–	0	1	–	4	–	1
$ – Conference champion

The 1893 Indiana Hoosiers football team was an American football team that represented Indiana University Bloomington as a member of the Indiana Intercollegiate Athletic Association (IIAA) during the 1893 college football season. Indiana played six games and compiled a 1–4–1 record, winning a game against the Danville Athletic Club (18–0), tying with Kentucky State College (24–24), and losing games to Purdue (64–0),Butler (38–0), Wabash (24–12), and DePauw (34–0).

== Schedule ==
Date	Opponent	Site	Result	Source
October 9	Danville Athletic Club (IN)*	Bloomington, IN	W 18–0	
October 14	at Purdue	Stuart Field; West Lafayette, IN (rivalry)	L 0–64	
October 21	Wabash	Bloomington, IN	L 12–24	
October 28	at Butler	Athletic Park; Indianapolis, IN	L 0–38	
November 4	at DePauw	Bloomington, IN	L 0–34	
November 30	at Kentucky State College*	Stoll Field; Lexington, KY (rivalry)	T 24–24	
*Non-conference game

== Personnel ==
=== Roster ===
Name	Position	Year
Ramsey		
Linnaeus Hines	Manager	
C. W. McMullen		
Munson Darwin Atwater	Manager	
Virgil R. Green		
Preston Eagleson		Soph.
William D. Milroy		
Hamilton		
Dee R. Jones		
Ora Herkless		
Thomas C. Holloway		
Ed Harris		
Oscar Pittinger		
Mark P. Helm		
Dick Miller		
William Myers		
Frank L. Glass		
Werter D. Dodd		
John A. Shafer (C)		
Emmett O. King		
Kenneth Brewer		

=== Staffing ===
Syrett, Coach
