= Edward C. Robertson =

American football player and coach (1876–1903)

Biographical details
- Born: November 1876; Albion, Indiana, U.S.
- Died: October 31, 1903 (aged 26); Indianapolis, Indiana, U.S.

Playing career
- 1898–1900: Purdue
- Positions: Quarterback, halfback

Coaching career (HC unless noted)
- 1901: Earlham
- 1903: Purdue (assistant)

Head coaching record
- Overall: 2–4

Edward Cool Robertson (November 1876 – October 31, 1903) was an American college football player and coach. He served as the head football coach at Earlham College in Richmond, Indiana for one season, in 1901, after a successful playing career at Purdue University.

Robertson died in a tragic train accident in 1903 when he was serving as an assistant coach at Purdue. He and 15 others associated with the Purdue team perished during a train collision in Indianapolis while the team was on its way to play Indiana.

== Head coaching record ==
Year	Team	Overall	Conference	Standing	Bowl/playoffs
Earlham Quakers (Independent) (1901)
1901	Earlham	2–4			
Earlham:		2–4			
Total:		2–4			
