= W. H. Bannard =

American football player and coach (1875–1913)

Biographical details
- Born: March 6, 1875; Plainfield, New Jersey, U.S.
- Died: March 22, 1913 (aged 38); Asbury Park, New Jersey, U.S.

Playing career
- 1894–1897: Princeton
- Position(s): Halfback, punter

Coaching career (HC unless noted)
- 1898: Northwestern

Head coaching record
- Overall: 9–4–1

Accomplishments and honors

Awards
- Third-team All-American (1897)

William Heath Bannard (March 6, 1875 – March 22, 1913) was an American college football player and coach. He served as the fifth head football coach at Northwestern University, coaching one season in 1898 and compiling a record of 9–4–1. He is the author of "Football: How to Play the Game", published in 1905. He died of Bright's disease in 1913.

== Head coaching record ==
Year	Team	Overall	Conference	Standing	Bowl/playoffs
Northwestern Purple (Western Conference) (1898)
1898	Northwestern	9–4–1	0–4	7th	
Northwestern:		9–4–1	0–4		
Total:		9–4–1			
