= 1891 Purdue football team =

American college football season

1891 Purdue football
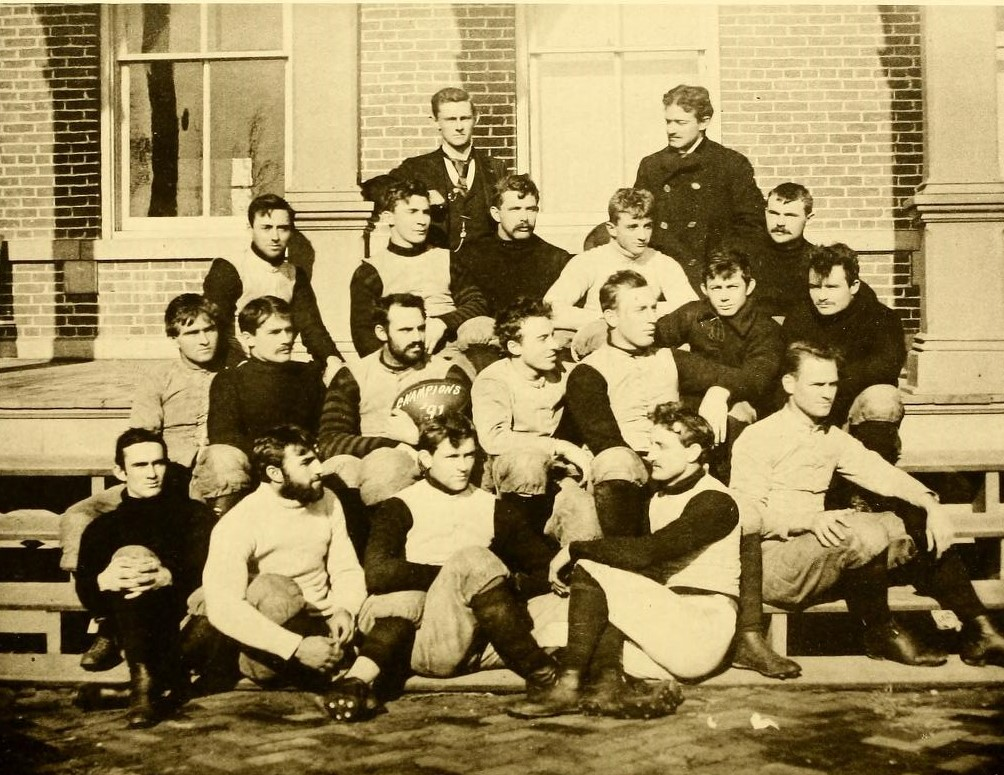

IIAA champion
- Conference: Indiana Intercollegiate Athletic Association
- Record: 4–0 (4–0 IIAA)
- Head coach: Knowlton Ames (1st season)
- Captain: J. C. Teeters

1891 Indiana Intercollegiate Athletic Association football standings
	Conf.					Overall
Team	W		L		T	W		L		T
Purdue $	4	–	0	–	0	4	–	0	–	0
Butler	3	–	2	–	0	4	–	3	–	0
Wabash	1	–	3	–	0	1	–	3	–	0
Indiana	0	–	5	–	0	1	–	5	–	0
$ – Conference champion

The 1891 Purdue football team was an American football team that represented Purdue University during the 1891 college football season. The team compiled a 4–0 record in the university's fourth season fielding an intercollegiate football team. For the 1891 season, Purdue hired Knowlton Ames as its football coach. Ames played for Princeton from 1886 to 1889 and was considered one of the greatest players ever to play college football, after scoring 730 points for Princeton. The 1891 Purdue team shut out all four opponents, outscoring Wabash, DePauw, Indiana, and Butler by a total of 194 to 0. Purdue's 60–0 victory over Indiana was the first installment in a rivalry which later became noted for the award of the Old Oaken Bucket trophy. It was this team that earned the university the Boilermakers nickname, as the Daily Argus News, a local Crawfordsville newspaper, reported on the game versus Wabash with the article Slaughter of Innocents: Wabash Snowed Completely Under by the Burly Boiler Makers from Purdue [sic].

J. C. Teeters was the team captain.

== Schedule ==
Date	Opponent	Site	Result	Attendance	Source
October 24	at Wabash	Crawfordsville, IN	W 46–0		
November 9	DePauw	Lafayette, IN	W 30–0		
November 14	Indiana	Lafayette, IN (rivalry)	W 60–0	1,200	
November 26	at Butler	Indianapolis, IN	W 58–0		

== Roster ==
- Larry Downs
- Bill Finney
- A. L. Fulkerson
- Charles Hardy
- Art Herkless
- S. M. Kintner
- Bob Lackey
- Jesse Little
- Sam Moore
- Walt Muessel
- Archibald Stevenson
- Jimmy Studebaker
- J. C. Teeters
- Jack Thompson
