= John Minds =

American football player and coach (1871–1963)

Biographical details
- Born: April 9, 1871; Schuylkill County, Pennsylvania, U.S.
- Died: December 31, 1963 (aged 92); Philadelphia, Pennsylvania, U.S.

Playing career
- 1894–1897: Penn
- Positions: Fullback, tackle

Coaching career (HC unless noted)
- 1898: Minnesota

Head coaching record
- Overall: 4–5

Accomplishments and honors

Awards
- Consensus All-American (1897)
- College Football Hall of Fame; Inducted in 1962 (profile)

John Henry Minds (April 9, 1871 – December 31, 1963) was an American college football player and coach. He played football at the University of Pennsylvania as a fullback and tackle from 1894 to 1897. Minds served as the head football coach at the University of Minnesota in 1898, compiling a record of 4–5. He was elected to the College Football Hall of Fame as a player in 1962.

Minds was a later a lawyer and general solicitor for the United Gas Improvement Co.—now known as UGI Corporation. He died on December 31, 1963, at his home in the Rittenhouse Square neighborhood of Philadelphia.

== Head coaching record ==
Year	Team	Overall	Conference	Standing	Bowl/playoffs
Minnesota Golden Gophers (Western Conference) (1898)
1898	Minnesota	4–5	1–2	5th	
Minnesota:		4–5	1–2		
Total:		4–5			
