= 1898 All-Western college football team =

American all-star college football team

The 1898 All-Western college football team consists of American football players selected to the All-Western teams chosen by various selectors for the 1898 college football season.

== All-Western selections ==
=== Ends ===
- Neil Snow, Michigan (CW) (CFHOF)
- John W. F. Bennett, Michigan (CW)

=== Tackles ===
- Allen Steckle, Michigan (CW)
- Bothne, Northwestern (CW)

=== Guards ===
- Clarence James Rogers, Chicago (CW)
- Bunge, Beloit (CW)

=== Centers ===
- William Cunningham, Michigan (CW)

=== Quarterbacks ===
- Walter S. Kennedy, Chicago (CW)

=== Halfbacks ===
- William Caley, Michigan (CW)
- Frank Louis Slaker, Chicago (CW)

=== Fullbacks ===
- Pat O'Dea, Wisconsin (CW) (CFHOF)

== Key ==
CW = Caspar Whitney, for Harper's Weekly

CFHOF = College Football Hall of Fame

== See also ==
- 1898 College Football All-America Team
