= George Roy Harvey =

American football player and coach (1869–1935)

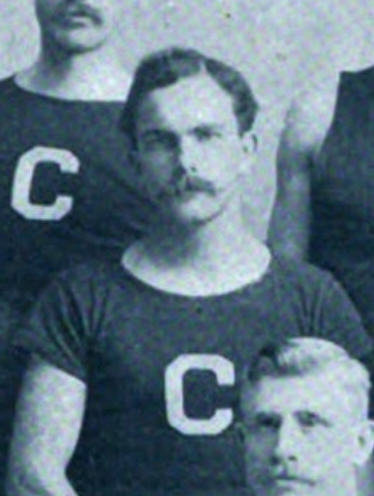
- Harvey pictured at Cornell, c. 1893

Biographical details
- Born: June 15, 1869; Hamilton, Ontario, Canada
- Died: May 11, 1935 (aged 65); Hamilton, Ontario, Canada
- Education: Cornell University (1893)

Playing career
- c. 1892: Cornell
- Position: Fullback

Coaching career (HC unless noted)
- 1893: Auburn

Head coaching record
- Overall: 2–0–2

George Roy Harvey (June 15, 1869 – May 11, 1935) was a Canadian college football coach. He served as the head football coach at Auburn University for four games in the fall of 1893, compiling a record of 2–0–2. D. M. Balliet had coached one game for Auburn earlier that year, in February. He was an alumnus of Cornell University.

== Head coaching record ==
Year	Team	Overall	Conference	Standing	Bowl/playoffs
Auburn Tigers (Independent) (1893)
1893	Auburn	2–0–2 (Note: D. M. Balliet coached one game in February 1893.)			
Auburn:		2–0–2			
Total:		2–0–2			
