= Knowlton Ames =

American football player and coach (1868–1931)

- Portrait of Ames from Walter Camp's 1894 book, American Football

Biographical details
- Born: May 23, 1868; Chicago, Illinois, U.S.
- Died: December 23, 1931 (aged 63); Chicago, Illinois, U.S.

Playing career
- 1886–1889: Princeton
- 1892: Chicago Athletic Association
- Position: Fullback

Coaching career (HC unless noted)
- 1891–1892: Northwestern
- 1891–1892: Purdue

Head coaching record
- Overall: 19–5–5

Accomplishments and honors

Championships
- 2 Indiana Intercollegiate Athletic Association (1891–1892)

Awards
- Consensus All-American (1889)
- College Football Hall of Fame; Inducted in 1969 (profile)

Knowlton Lyman "Snake" Ames (May 27, 1868 – December 23, 1931) was an American football player and coach. He played for Princeton University from 1886 to 1889, and the Chicago Athletic Association, in 1892. Playing for the Princeton Tigers, Ames was selected to the 1889 All-America college football team as a fullback. In 1891 and 1892, he was the head football coach at Purdue University. He is also credited as the first head football coach at Northwestern University. Ames was inducted into the College Football Hall of Fame as a player in 1969.

== Biography ==
=== College career ===
At Princeton, Ames scored 730 points for the Tigers from 1886 to 1889, including 62 touchdowns. The achievement of scoring 730 points is an unofficial college football career record, although only records set since the NCAA began keeping records in 1937 are considered official. He was named to the first-ever All-America team in 1889.

=== Coaching career ===
After graduation, Ames became the head coach for Purdue University, where he led the Boilermakers to a 12–0 record over two years.

Ames was hired as the first ever coach of the Northwestern Wildcats in 1891, and coached three games before taking leave to become the coach at Purdue. Northwestern credits Ames as the head coach for the 1891 and 1892 seasons with a total record of 7–5–5.

=== Chicago Athletic Association ===
Ames returned to playing football with the Chicago Athletic Association in 1892. During an October 22 game in Cleveland, Ames and fellow player Pudge Heffelfinger were observed by the manager of the Pittsburgh Athletic Club. A week later the Pittsburgh Press printed a rumor that the Pittsburgh Athletic Club was offering Heffelfinger and Ames $250 to play for the team on Saturday, November 12, against their rivals, the Allegheny Athletic Association. Meanwhile, another version of the story had Ames being offered only $100. However, the rumor either turned out to be false or Heffelfinger and Ames turned down Pittsburgh's offer.

During an 1892 Chicago game against the Brooklyn Crescents, the Crescents refused to take field unless Chicago's Sport Donnelly was barred from the Chicago lineup because of some alleged rough tactics he used while playing for the Manhattan Athletic Club, in 1891. Chicago benched Donnelly, and his absence resulted in a tied game. Donnelly then became enraged and refused to rejoin the team in Chicago. Heffelfinger and Ames joined Donnelly in the walkout. Afterward Donnelly and Heffelfinger signed an agreement with the Allegheny Athletic Association, becoming the first known professional football players. Meanwhile, Ames had decided to forgo the game rather than risk his amateur status. He returned to coaching at Princeton.

=== Late life and death ===
After retiring from football, Ames had a career in finance and publishing. He founded the Chicago Journal of Commerce and served as its publisher until shortly before his death. Ames also served as chairman of the board of the Booth Fisheries Company and had other business interests as well.

In 1931, Ames committed suicide, shooting himself with a .38 caliber revolver as he sat is his car. Ames was age 63 at the time of his death and had recently suffered business losses.

== Personal life ==
Ames's father, Miner Thomas Ames, was a Chicago coal magnate. Ames's son, Knowlton Lyman Ames Jr., also played for Princeton.

== Head coaching record ==
Year	Team	Overall	Conference	Standing	Bowl/playoffs
Northwestern Purple (Independent) (1891)
1891	Northwestern	2–2–3			
Northwestern Purple (Intercollegiate Athletic Association of the Northwest) (1892)
1892	Northwestern	5–3–2	1–3	4th	
Northwestern:		7–5–5	1–3		
Purdue Boilermakers (Indiana Intercollegiate Athletic Association) (1891–1892)
1891	Purdue	4–0	4–0	1st	
1892	Purdue	8–0	4–0	1st	
Purdue:		12–0	8–0		
Total:		19–5–5			
National championship Conference title Conference division title or championship game berth
