= W. P. Finney =

American football player and coach (1871–1954)

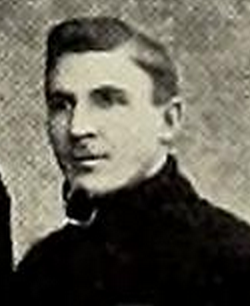
- Finney during his time at Purdue

Biographical details
- Born: April 14, 1871; Dana, Indiana, U.S.
- Died: March 6, 1954 (aged 82); Los Angeles County, California, U.S.
- Education: Purdue University (1893)

Playing career
- 1890–1893: Purdue
- 1892: Chicago Athletic Association
- Positions: Tackle, halfback

Coaching career (HC unless noted)
- 1893: Iowa Agricultural
- 1894: Kentucky State College

Head coaching record
- Overall: 5–4

William Porter Finney (April 14, 1871 – March 6, 1954) was an American college football player and coach. He was second head football coach at Iowa Agricultural College—now known as the Iowa State University in Ames, Iowa, serving for one season, in 1893, and compiled a record of 0–3. Finney also coached Kentucky State College—now known as the University of Kentucky—in 1894, tallying a mark of 5–1.

Finney attended Purdue University, where he played on the football team from 1890 to 1893. He was the captain of the 1893 team and also won multiple letters in the sport. He additionally played for the Chicago Athletic Association during that team's eastern tour in 1892.

Finney later relocated to California, where he was employed as a railway engineer.

== Head coaching record ==
Year	Team	Overall	Conference	Standing
Iowa Agricultural Cardinals (Independent) (1893)
1893	Iowa Agricultural	0–3		
Iowa Agricultural:		0–3		
Kentucky State College Blue and White (Independent) (1894)
1894	Kentucky State College	5–1		
Kentucky State College:		5–1		
Total:		5–4		
