= Dixon College =

Private college in Dixon, Illinois, USA

Dixon College or Dixon Business College was a private college in Dixon, Illinois, USA. It operated together with Northern Illinois Normal School, a teacher training institution, from 1881 until some time after 1914.

Northern Illinois Normal School was chartered by the state on April 18, 1872, and for a while operated as the teacher training department of Rock River University. The combined Dixon College and Northern Illinois Normal School was incorporated in 1880 and opened on September 2, 1881, moving the following year to purpose-built buildings on Hancock Street on the west side of Dixon. The first president was John C. Flint and the first principal Jesse B. Dille. The principal was F. E. Rice in 1906, F. B. Virden in 1911 and 1914–15, I. Frank Edwards in 1913. In 1891 enrollment was almost 1,200. On June 3, 1901, it received a charter as Dixon College. Edwards, the former county superintendent of schools, had acquired the college by 1914; at some point after that date, it closed.

In 1903 the college advertised that it taught "practically everything". In 1907 in addition to Dixon Business College it was using the names Northern Illinois College of Music, Northern Illinois College of Shorthand, Northern Illinois College of Telegraphy, Northern Illinois College of Art, Northern Illinois College of Law, Dixon School of Oratory, and Dixon Military College, and was one of two examples in an article in the Annual Report of the American Bar Association of institutions "prostitut[ing]" academic degrees by requiring too little time for a law degree.

== Notable alumni ==
- Davy Jones, Major League baseball player
- Noah M. Mason, US Congressman
- Olaf M. Norlie, pastor and academic
