= D. M. Balliet =

American football player and coach (1866–1960)

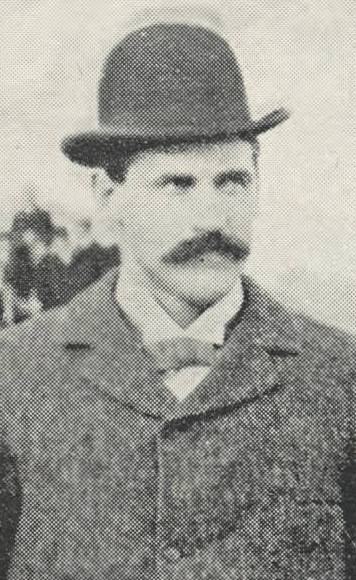
- Balliet cropped from the 1894 Purdue team photo

Biographical details
- Born: August 25, 1866; Lehighton, Pennsylvania, U.S.
- Died: August 6, 1960 (aged 93); Myerstown, Pennsylvania, U.S.

Playing career
- c. 1891: Lehigh
- 1892–1893: Princeton
- Position: Center

Coaching career (HC unless noted)
- 1893: Auburn
- 1893–1895: Purdue
- 1901: Purdue (head or assistant)
- 1902: Princeton (assistant)
- 1902: Washington and Lee (assistant)
- 1903–1904: Washington and Lee

Head coaching record
- Overall: 25–13–1

Accomplishments and honors

Championships
- 2 Indiana Intercollegiate Athletic Association (1893–1894)

David Milton "Pete" Balliet (August 25, 1866 – August 6, 1960) was an American college football player and coach. He served as the head football coach at Auburn University for one game in February 1893, at Purdue University from 1893 to 1895 and again in 1901, and at Washington and Lee University from 1903 to 1904, compiling a career head coaching record of 25–13–1. Balliet played as a center at Lehigh University and Princeton University.

== Early years and playing career ==
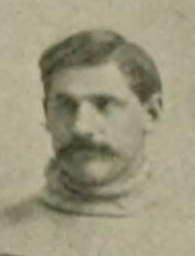
Balliet cropped from the 1891 Lehigh football team photo

Balliet was a native of Lehighton, Pennsylvania, and was born on August 25, 1866. He attended preparatory school at the Meyerstown Academy and then played center for two seasons for the Lehigh University football team.

=== Princeton ===
In the fall of 1892, Balliet joined the Princeton Tigers football team. In September 1892, The New York Times reported: "Among the promising new men who are practicing are Balliet, centre rush of last year's Lehigh team." He played at center for Princeton during the 1892 and 1893 seasons.

The 1893 Princeton team finished the season undefeated at 11–0, and was later recognized as a national champion. Balliet graduated from Princeton with the class of 1894.

== Coaching career ==
Balliet was the second head coach in the history of Auburn Tigers football. He coached only a single game for the program, a contest against Alabama played on February 22, 1893, at Lakeview Park in Birmingham, Alabama, the first intercollegiate game in the state. Auburn defeated Alabama in the game, the first meeting between the two schools, by a score of 32 to 22.

On September 13, 1893, Balliet started work as head football coach at Purdue University. He vacated the position just eight days later, before any games took place, to rejoin the Princeton team as a player. This move, permitted under the terms of his contract, was amicably accepted by Purdue. Balliet's replacement at Purdue was his former Princeton teammate M. P. Randolph.

Balliet returned as Purdue coach in 1894 and led the team to a 9–1 record. During that season, Balliet's Purdue squad defeated Amos Alonzo Stagg's Chicago Maroons and outscored opponents by a collective score of 177 to 42. His 1895 squad finished with a record of 4–3. In 1897, Balliet was reported to have given up a successful law practice to join the Klondike Gold Rush in Alaska.

Balliet was re-hired by Purdue in 1901. While Purdue credits him as head coach that season, several (albeit not all) contemporary news accounts identify Alpha Jamison as head coach, with Balliet in an assistant role. The 1901 Purdue team finished with a 4–4–1 record, closing with consecutive losses to Notre Dame, Illinois, and Northwestern. At the end of the 1901 season, Purdue opted not to renew Balliet's services. In March 1902, the Indianapolis News reported, "He is known to be a good coach, but he turned out a loser last year and Purdue wants a change." At Purdue, Balliet compiled a record of 17–8–1 in three seasons (including 1901) – or 22–10–2 if the team's 1893 season, which he abandoned before the first game, is credited to his record.

Balliet began the fall of 1902 back at his alma mater, Princeton, as an assistant coach. In early October, he joined the football team at Washington and Lee University to assist physical director, Bill Wertenbaker. Balliet served as the head football coach at Washington and Lee for the 1903 and 1904 seasons.

== Family and later years ==
Balliet married Sara A. Uhrich on July 19, 1894. The couple had a daughter, Catharine Uhrich, born on July 5, 1895. He moved to Myerstown, Pennsylvania, in approximately 1895 and lived there for the next 65 years. Balliet worked for most of his career as a coal salesman. In 1909, Balliet was employed by the Clark Brothers Coal Mining Company in Philadelphia. He described himself at the time as "a globe-trotter for a wholesale coal company."

=== Death ===
He died at his home in Myerstown on August 6, 1960, at age 93.

== Head coaching record ==
Year	Team	Overall	Conference	Standing	Bowl/playoffs
Auburn Tigers (Independent) (1893)
1893	Auburn	1–0 (Note: George Roy Harvey coached four games in the fall of 1893.)			
Auburn:		1–0			
Purdue Boilermakers (Indiana Intercollegiate Athletic Association) (1893–1894)
1893	Purdue	– (Note: Balliet was replaced as coach by M. P. Randolph before the 1893 season began.)	–	1st	
1894	Purdue	9–1	4–0	1st	
Purdue Boilermakers (Independent) (1895)
1895	Purdue	4–3			
Purdue Boilermakers (Western Conference) (1901)
1901	Purdue	4–4–1 (Note: Sources differ as to whether Balliet was a head coach or assistant coach in 1901.)	0–3–1	7th	
Purdue:		17–8–1	4–3–1		
Washington and Lee Generals (Independent) (1904)
1903	Washington and Lee	4–1			
1904	Washington and Lee	3–4			
Washington and Lee:		7–5			
Total:		25–13–1			

== See also ==
- List of college football head coaches with non-consecutive tenure
