= Alpha Jamison =

American football player and sports coach (1875–1962)

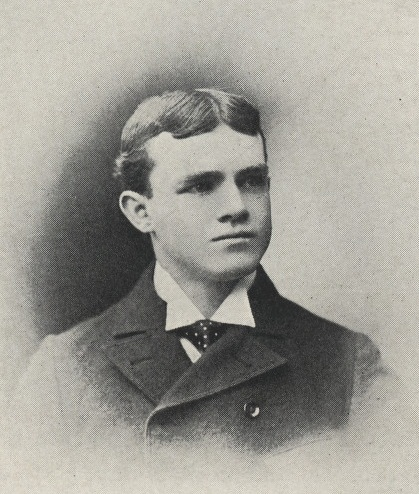
- Jamison from 1897 Purdue yearbook

Biographical details
- Born: November 27, 1875; Lafayette, Indiana, U.S.
- Died: April 12, 1962 (aged 86); Lafayette, Indiana, U.S.

Playing career

Football
- 1892–1896: Purdue
- Positions: Halfback, fullback, quarterback

Coaching career (HC unless noted)

Football
- 1898–1900: Purdue
- 1901: Purdue (head or assistant)

Basketball
- 1899–1901: Purdue

Head coaching record
- Overall: 11–11–1 (football); 12–1 (basketball)

Alpha Pierce Jamison (November 27, 1875 – April 12, 1962) was an American football player and coach of football and basketball. He served as the head football coach at Purdue University from 1898 to 1900, compiling a record of 11–11–1. Some contemporary news articles report that Jamison continued as Purdue's head football coach for the 1901 season, with D. M. Balliet serving as assistant; other sources, including the university's football media guide, identify Balliet as that season's head coach. The Purdue Debris 1902 yearbook lists both men simply as "coaches" of the 1901 team.

Jamison was also the head basketball coach at Purdue for two seasons from 1899 to 1901, tallying a mark of 12–1.

== Head coaching record ==
=== Football ===
Year	Team	Overall	Conference	Standing	Bowl/playoffs
Purdue Boilermakers (Western Conference) (1898–1900)
1898	Purdue	3–3	0–1	6th	
1899	Purdue	4–4–1	1–2	5th	
1900	Purdue	4–4	0–4	9th	
Purdue:		11–11–1	1–7		
Total:		11–11–1			

=== Basketball ===
Record table
Season	Team	Overall	Conference	Standing	Postseason
Purdue Boilermakers (Western Conference) (1899–1901)
1899–1900	Purdue	0–1	0–0	3rd†	
1900–01	Purdue	12–0	2–0	1st†	
Purdue:		12–1 (.923)			
Total:		12–1 (.923)			

† Intramural play only; the conference did not have an official championship winner
