= Indiana Intercollegiate Athletic Association =

College sports conference in Indiana

- Founded: 1890
- Folded: 1907/1922
- Sports fielded: 5 (baseball, football, track, basketball, and tennis)
- No. of teams: 7 (charter), 11 (total)

The Indiana Intercollegiate Athletic Association was a men's college athletic conference in the United States, established in 1890 by institutions in the state of Indiana. At a time when the National Collegiate Athletic Association (NCAA) did not yet exist, such organizations attempted to bring order out of the chaos of the formative years of American intercollegiate sports.

== History ==
The IIAA was founded on March 1, 1890, in a meeting held at the Indianapolis YMCA. The seven charter member institutions were Indiana, Purdue, Butler, Wabash, DePauw, Hanover, and Franklin. Initial officers included W. H. Bliss of Indiana (president), R. D. Meeker of Butler (vice president), and A. H. Bradshaw of Franklin (secretary). At least one source later claimed a track meet at Butler in 1889--the year prior to the founding of the IIAA--as the association's first competition, leading to long-lasting confusion over the date of its founding.

The IIAA existed at a time of transition for intercollegiate athletics. When it was created, college sports were only loosely controlled by the institutions they represented; most schools followed the Yale model, in which programs were run by a combination of students, alumni, and boosters. By the time of its dissolution, most larger schools (and an increasing number of smaller ones) had adopted the Chicago model, featuring an athletic director and multi-sport coach who was a full-time employee of the institution, on the model of Amos Alonzo Stagg, whom the University of Chicago had hired for such a role in 1892. Nevertheless, as late as 1903–4, the IIAA was still a student-run organization. That year, C. L. Peck, "an Indianapolis student at Purdue," was elected IIAA president at the association's annual December meeting.

The constitution drafted by the founders stipulated that every participant in an IIAA contest must be "an active member of the college he represents" who had never been paid for playing his sport. "Graduate instructors" were barred from competition. Five years later, amendments were added barring the practice of athletes playing under an "assumed name" and preventing members from playing against "any professional team representing so-called athletic associations." The latter rule came in response to the growing phenomenon of play-for-pay baseball and football among urban athletic clubs and YMCA teams. In 1896 the IIAA lifted the ban on playing against professional teams, but at the same time agreed to "clothe the professors of the colleges with power to decide who shall belong to the college clubs." This had the practical effect of preventing the conference's teams from hiring non-student "ringers" to supplement their rosters. More generally, it was an important step in extending faculty control over intercollegiate athletics in Indiana.

The first official IIAA competition was a six-game round robin in baseball, scheduled for the spring of 1890, the results of which are lost to history. Rose Polytechnic (today Rose-Hulman Institute of Technology) became the eighth conference member later in the spring of 1890, too late for baseball but in time to participate in, and win, the first IIAA track meet, held that May. By the fall of 1891, five members (all but Hanover, Franklin, and Rose Polytechnic) were playing a four-game round robin in football, with the last game on Thanksgiving Day in Indianapolis. The IIAA drafted a six-game schedule for baseball for the spring of 1892 (with Franklin not participating) and a five-game schedule for football (without Franklin or Hanover) for the fall of 1892. By the spring of 1893, Earlham had joined the IIAA as its ninth member.

The IIAA faced its first crisis on Thanksgiving Day, 1894, when Butler played a home game against the eleven of the Indiana Light Artillery, cutting into the gate of the Purdue-DePauw game, slotted months earlier to be the season finale in Indianapolis. DePauw subsequently demanded that Butler be expelled from the IIAA for scheduling a game that competed with the conference contest, even though it had violated no rule in doing so. When Butler survived the March 1895 expulsion vote, DePauw quit the IIAA in protest (only temporarily, as it turned out). At the time, the IIAA remained at nine members by admitting Indiana State and promptly integrating the newcomers into the spring 1895 baseball schedule. The dust had barely settled when Purdue, in May 1895, accused Wabash of using a professional pitcher in their conference contest, sparking another crisis. Protested games became common enough to pose a serious burden on the conference, at a time when there was no such thing as a commissioner or conference office. A committee of the membership had to be assembled to adjudicate every protest, and to cover the cost, the IIAA began charging a fee to the losing party in a disputed contest.

The conference that eventually became the Big Ten was founded in February 1896 and overshadowed the IIAA for the remainder of its existence. Organized as the Intercollegiate Conference of Faculty Representatives, but popularly known as the Western Conference, it counted Purdue among its charter members and added Indiana in December 1899. To enable the state's two flagship universities to maintain a concurrent membership in the IIAA, in March 1900 the association adopted a new constitution committing its members to follow the same eligibility rules as the Western Conference.

By spring 1896 DePauw had returned to active membership, raising the number of IIAA schools to ten, but Franklin, Hanover, Earlham, and Indiana State did not field baseball teams. Everyone usually participated in the annual May track meet, but in 1897 Franklin and Hanover (the two least active IIAA members) missed it, too.

From the 1896–97 academic year through 1903–4, the University of Indianapolis, a short-lived conglomeration of Indianapolis academic institutions (not to be confused with the present-day school of the same name), appeared in place of Butler in the IIAA membership rolls, after Butler became the new university's undergraduate college. Until it regained its independence early in the new century, Butler competed, officially, as Indianapolis, and "Butler" appeared in the sports pages only as colloquial shorthand for the rebranded institution.

Notre Dame's "debut in Indiana athletics" came in the IIAA track meet of May 1898, shortly after it became the 11th member of the conference. It was an auspicious debut, as the Irish won the meet, albeit with Purdue protesting the results at the time, and other participants subsequently accusing them of using professionals to win the event. For its part, Notre Dame declared its intention to maintain good relations not just with Indiana colleges, but with all members of the Western Conference: "Athletics at Notre Dame shall be conducted in harmony with the regulations of both the Indiana Intercollegiate Athletic Association and the Intercollegiate Conference of Faculty Representatives."

Basketball, ultimately the most popular team sport in Indiana, was invented nearly two years after the IIAA was founded (in the winter of 1891–92, by James Naismith, at the YMCA Training School, today's Springfield College). By 1899–90, it had joined football, baseball, and track as a sport sponsored by the IIAA. Other than tennis (which, by 1903, had an annual tournament every May) it was the only sport added by the IIAA after its founding.

By the turn of the century, the initial concept of crowning champions based on a round-robin schedule in baseball and football had broken down, the victim of too many disputed contests and (especially among the smallest schools) teams not being fielded in some sports in some years, or not completing their schedules. While basketball was recognized as a conference sport, nothing like a coherent schedule was ever attempted. Ultimately, the IIAA was able to declare definitive champions only in track and tennis, where the decision was based on a single season-ending meet or tournament.

In December 1900, the IIAA expelled DePauw "for failure to conform to the rules of eligibility for players." Franklin resigned the same month, reducing the conference to nine members. Hanover disappeared from the membership rolls by the end of 1902, leaving eight schools to attend the IIAA meeting that December: Indiana, Purdue, Notre Dame, Butler, Wabash, Rose Polytechnic, Earlham, and Indiana State.

== Decline and demise ==
In December 1902, during the annual meeting of the IIAA in Indianapolis, representatives of the smaller colleges of Indiana held their own meeting to form the Indiana College Athletic League. In the ensuing realignment of conference affiliations, Earlham and Indiana State left the IIAA to join Hanover and Franklin in the ICAL. Indiana, Purdue, Notre Dame, and DePauw (readmitted since its 1900 expulsion) remained in the IIAA. Wabash and Rose Polytechnic maintained active membership in both organizations, Butler in neither. After the split, the IIAA went through the motions of expelling members that had already left. The agenda for the December 1903 meeting included officially dropping Hanover, Franklin, Earlham, and "the University of Indianapolis" (Butler) on the grounds that they "have taken little interest in the association and have not paid their dues."

Eligibility issues clouded the IIAA's last years. In the fall of 1903 Charles Wade, former football captain at Indiana State, enrolled at Indiana and suited up for the Hoosiers, in violation of an IIAA rule requiring transfer students to sit out a year of play. Wade did not even inform Indiana State that he would be transferring, and the press noted that his former teammates suffered from "such demoralization that the football schedule has been canceled." The same season, the Wabash football roster included Samuel Gordon, an African American player. Rose Polytechnic refused to play a scheduled home game against Wabash, "standing on their principles on the color line," and offered to pay the requisite IIAA forfeit fee. Wabash filled the gap in their schedule with a game at Culver Academy on the same day, but did not take Gordon because he was injured. Rose Polytechnic then refused to pay the forfeit money, arguing that they did not owe Wabash anything because Gordon would not have been fit to play against them on the day of the canceled game. Later in the season, Gordon's presence on the Wabash eleven caused problems for some opponents (Hanover and DePauw) but not for others (Earlham and Notre Dame). Such disputes only served to increase animosities among members of the IIAA and further weaken the cohesion of the conference.

In April 1907, the Western Conference voted to bar its members from playing any opponents that did not conform to "the conference rules of eligibility," including a rule barring freshmen from varsity competition. This decision dealt a severe blow to the IIAA. In the constitution it adopted in 1900, the association committed its members to follow the eligibility rules of the Western Conference, but it had not enforced the freshman rule, and prior to 1907, the Western Conference had not pressed the issue. Now it did, and Wabash led the way in refusing to comply. At the next annual meeting of the IIAA in December 1907, attempts to find a solution proved fruitless, as Notre Dame, for the sake of getting games with Western Conference teams, aligned with Indiana and Purdue on the freshman rule. A disappointed sportswriter summed it up: "Consequently, there will be no meetings between [Western] conference and non-conference schools in Indiana for a long time, and state titles in all branches of college athletics are ended."

Press reports of the failed meeting declared the IIAA "dissolved." A year later, the term used was "practically defunct." Among the smaller colleges, only DePauw tried to abide by the freshman rule, and only until 1909, when it quit the IIAA, then joined the ICAL the following year. Nevertheless, the IIAA continued to exist, though mostly to preserve its annual track meet as a showcase for the state's emerging "big three" of athletics, Notre Dame plus Indiana and Purdue. Any other school not previously expelled from the association was welcome to send a team to the meet, as long as the roster conformed to Western Conference rules, including the ban on freshmen. The same was true of the IIAA tennis tournament. Any of the smaller current or former members of the IIAA could also continue to schedule the "big three" in football, baseball, or basketball, as long as they honored the freshman rule in those contests. But the rule effectively established a barrier between major and minor programs, since the latter simply did not have enough athletic students on campus to field competitive varsity teams consisting entirely of upperclassmen, plus separate freshman teams, as the larger schools did.

The annual IIAA track meet received a boost in 1915 when it was declared an "open" meet. This designation, apparently acceptable to the Western Conference, enabled the smaller colleges of the state to compete in the meet against Indiana, Purdue, and Notre Dame using ICAL eligibility rules (allowing freshmen to participate) while the "big three" adhered to Western Conference eligibility rules (still barring freshmen). The IIAA held its last track meet and tennis tournament in May 1922. Later that year, the organization was superseded by the new Indiana Intercollegiate Conference.

== Football champions ==
		Record		
Year	Champion	Conference	Overall	Head coach
1890	Butler	3–0–1	3–0–1	Billy Crawford
1891	Purdue	4–0	4–0	Knowlton Ames
1892	Purdue	4–0	8–0	Knowlton Ames
1893	Purdue	4–0	5–2–1	D. M. Balliet
1894	Purdue	4–0	9–1	D. M. Balliet

== See also ==
- List of Indiana Intercollegiate Athletic Association football standings
- List of defunct college football conferences
