= 1901 Carlisle Indians football team =

American college football season

1901 Carlisle Indians football
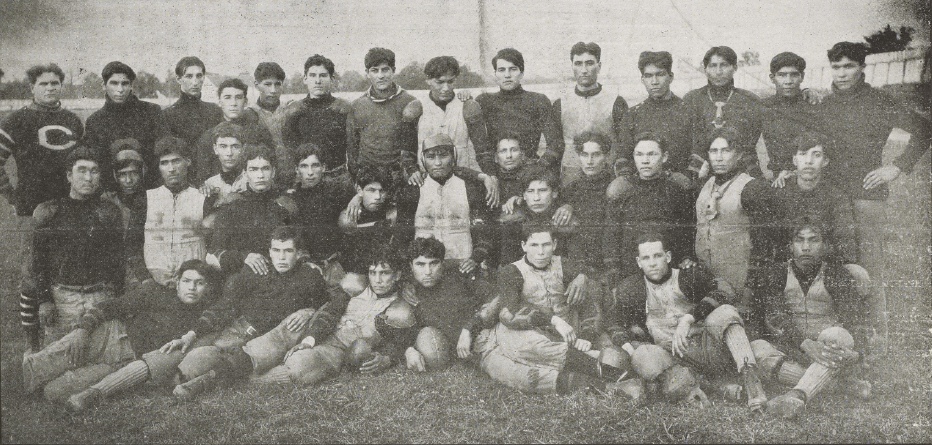
- Conference: Independent
- Record: 5–7–1
- Head coach: Pop Warner (3rd season)
- Captain: Martin Wheelock
- Home stadium: Indian Field

1901 Eastern college football independents records
	Conf.			Overall
Team	W	L	T	W		L		T
Harvard		–		12	–	0	–	0
Yale		–		11	–	1	–	1
Cornell		–		11	–	1	–	0
Dartmouth		–		10	–	1	–	0
Massachusetts		–		9	–	1	–	0
Princeton		–		9	–	1	–	1
Syracuse		–		7	–	1	–	0
Geneva		–		7	–	1	–	1
Holy Cross		–		7	–	1	–	1
Army		–		5	–	1	–	2
Western U. of Penn		–		7	–	2	–	1
Lafayette		–		9	–	3	–	0
Swarthmore		–		8	–	2	–	2
Washington & Jefferson		–		6	–	2	–	2
Franklin & Marshall		–		7	–	3	–	1
Penn		–		10	–	5	–	0
Buffalo		–		4	–	2	–	0
Columbia		–		8	–	5	–	0
Fordham		–		2	–	1	–	1
Penn State		–		5	–	3	–	0
Bucknell		–		6	–	4	–	0
Temple		–		3	–	2	–	0
NYU		–		4	–	3	–	1
Pittsburgh College		–		3	–	3	–	0
Tufts		–		6	–	6	–	1
Vermont		–		5	–	5	–	1
Carlisle		–		5	–	7	–	1
Dickinson		–		4	–	6	–	0
Brown		–		4	–	7	–	1
Villanova		–		2	–	3	–	0
Drexel		–		2	–	5	–	1
Colgate		–		2	–	5	–	0
Boston College		–		1	–	8	–	0
Lehigh		–		1	–	11	–	0
New Hampshire		–		0	–	6	–	0
Rutgers		–		0	–	7	–	0

The 1901 Carlisle Indians football team represented the Carlisle Indian Industrial School as an independent during the 1901 college football season. Led by third-year head coach Pop Warner, the Indians compiled a 5–7–1 record and was outscored by a total of 168 to 134.

Two Carlisle players received honors from Walter Camp on the 1901 All-America team: Martin Wheelock as a second-team tackle and Jimmy Johnson as a third-team quarterback. Johnson was posthumously inducted into the College Football Hall of Fame in 1969.

Carlisle was one of three Native American schools in 1901 to field football teams that competed in college football. The other two were Haskell (6–2) in Kansas and Chilocco (2–5) in the Oklahoma Territory.

== Schedule ==
Date	Time	Opponent	Site	Result	Attendance	Source
September 21		Lebanon Valley	Indian Field; Carlisle, PA	W 28–0		
September 28		Gallaudet	Indian Field; Carlisle, PA	W 19–6		
October 2	2:35 p.m.	vs. Gettysburg	Harrisburg, PA	L 5–6	1,000	
October 5	3:00 p.m.	at Dickinson	Dickinson's gridiron; Carlisle, PA	W 16–11	2,000	
October 12		vs. Bucknell	Williamsport, PA	W 6–5	5,000	
October 16		Haverford	Indian Field; Carlisle, PA	W 29–0		
October 19		vs. Cornell	Stadium of the Pan-American Exposition; Buffalo, NY	L 0–17	18,000	
October 26		at Harvard	Soldier's Field; Boston, MA	L 0–29		
November 2		vs. Michigan	Bennett Park; Detroit, MI	L 0–22	8,000	
November 9		at Navy	Worden Field; Annapolis, MD	L 5–16		
November 16		at Penn	Franklin Field; Philadelphia, PA	L 14–16	10,000	
November 23		vs. Washington & Jefferson	Exposition Park; Allegheny City, PA	T 0–0	1,500	
November 28		at Columbia	Polo Grounds; New York, NY	L 12–40	5,000	

== Game summaries ==
=== Week 4: vs. Dickinson ===
Despite the 16 to 11 Carlisle victory, The Dickinsonian called it "the greatest day in the football history of Dickinson."

=== Week 9: at Michigan ===
The national champion Michigan Wolverines defeated the Carlisle Indians, 22–0, in a game played at Bennett Park in Detroit on November 2. The game was watched by a crowd of 8,000 spectators that included China's Minister to the United States, Wu Ting-Fan, occupying a box with former United States Secretary of War, Russell A. Alger.

=== Week 13: at Columbia ===
Carlisle at Columbia

Team	1	2	Total
Carlisle	0	12	12
• Columbia	17	23	40

- Date: November 28, 1901
- Location: Polo Grounds •New York, NY
- Game attendance: 6,000
- Referee: J. C. McCracken (Penn)

The Columbia Lions rolled up their largest score of the season, defeating the Indians 40 to 12. It was 40 to 0 until the final five minutes. Starring in the contest was Columbia's backfield of Bill Morley, Harold Weekes, Dick Smith, and Chauncey L. Berrien.
