= Hockensmith =

Hockensmith is a surname. Notable people with the surname include:

- Steve Hockensmith (born 1968), American writer
- Wilbur Hockensmith (1878–1951), American football coach
