= 1901 Columbia Blue and White football team =

American college football season

1901 Columbia Blue and White football
- Conference: Independent
- Record: 8–5
- Head coach: George Sanford (3rd season)
- Captain: Chauncey L. Berrien
- Home stadium: Polo Grounds

1901 Eastern college football independents records
	Conf.			Overall
Team	W	L	T	W		L		T
Harvard		–		12	–	0	–	0
Yale		–		11	–	1	–	1
Cornell		–		11	–	1	–	0
Dartmouth		–		10	–	1	–	0
Massachusetts		–		9	–	1	–	0
Princeton		–		9	–	1	–	1
Syracuse		–		7	–	1	–	0
Geneva		–		7	–	1	–	1
Holy Cross		–		7	–	1	–	1
Army		–		5	–	1	–	2
Western U. of Penn		–		7	–	2	–	1
Lafayette		–		9	–	3	–	0
Swarthmore		–		8	–	2	–	2
Washington & Jefferson		–		6	–	2	–	2
Franklin & Marshall		–		7	–	3	–	1
Penn		–		10	–	5	–	0
Buffalo		–		4	–	2	–	0
Columbia		–		8	–	5	–	0
Fordham		–		2	–	1	–	1
Penn State		–		5	–	3	–	0
Bucknell		–		6	–	4	–	0
Temple		–		3	–	2	–	0
NYU		–		4	–	3	–	1
Pittsburgh College		–		3	–	3	–	0
Tufts		–		6	–	6	–	1
Vermont		–		5	–	5	–	1
Carlisle		–		5	–	7	–	1
Dickinson		–		4	–	6	–	0
Brown		–		4	–	7	–	1
Villanova		–		2	–	3	–	0
Drexel		–		2	–	5	–	1
Colgate		–		2	–	5	–	0
Boston College		–		1	–	8	–	0
Lehigh		–		1	–	11	–	0
New Hampshire		–		0	–	6	–	0
Rutgers		–		0	–	7	–	0

The 1901 Columbia Blue and White football team was an American football team that represented Columbia University as an independent during the 1901 college football season. In its third and final season under head coach George Sanford, the team compiled an 8–5 record and outscored opponents by a total of 158 to 91. Chauncey L. Berrien was the team captain.

Two Columbia backs were selected as first-team players on the 1901 All-America team: Harold Weekes (from Walter Camp) and Bill Morley (from Caspar Whitney). Berrien and Richard Shore Smith also played in the backfield.

In its October 1901 preview of the college football season, Harper's Weekly opined: "In Weekes, Morley, and Berrien, Columbia has a trio that is equalled by no other college this year."

Columbia's sports teams were commonly called the "Blue and White" in this era, but had no official nickname. The name "Lions" would not be adopted until 1910.

The team played its home games at the Polo Grounds in Upper Manhattan.

== Schedule ==
Date	Time	Opponent	Site	Result	Attendance	Source
September 28	3:00 p.m.	at Buffalo	Pan-American Exposition Stadium; Buffalo, NY	L 0–5	7,000–8,000	
October 2		at Rutgers	Neilson Field; New Brunswick, NJ	W 27–0		
October 5		Williams	Polo Grounds; New York, NY	W 5–0		
October 12		at Harvard	Soldier's Field; Boston, MA	L 0–18		
October 19		Hamilton	Polo Grounds; New York, NY	W 12–0		
October 26		at Yale	Yale Field; New Haven, CT	L 5–10		
October 30		Haverford	Polo Grounds; New York, NY	W 29–6		
November 2		Penn	Polo Grounds; New York, NY	W 11–0		
November 5		Georgetown	Polo Grounds; New York, NY	W 18–0		
November 9		Syracuse	Polo Grounds; New York, NY	L 5–11		
November 16		Cornell	Polo Grounds; New York, NY (rivalry)	L 0–24		
November 20		at Navy	Worden Field; Annapolis, MD	W 6–5		
November 28		Carlisle	Polo Grounds; New York, NY	W 40–12	5,000	

== Season summary ==
=== Preseason ===
Morley resigned as captain and Chauncey L. Berrien took his place.

=== Week 1: at Buffalo ===
On the eve of the first game with Buffalo, the faculty announced a number of leading players were forbidden to play.

=== Week 4: at Harvard ===
In "the first big football battle of the season," Columbia lost to Harvard 18 to 0. Captain Berrien had been prevented from playing by Columbia faculty.

=== Week 6: at Yale ===
Columbia gave Yale one of its hardest games of the season in a 10 to 5 loss, holding the Bulldogs scoreless in the first half.

=== Week 8: Penn ===
Columbia defeated Penn 10 to 0, its first victory over Penn since the school instituted a coaching system, and its second ever.

=== Week 13: Carlisle ===
Carlisle at Columbia

Team	1	2	Total
Carlisle	0	12	12
• Columbia	17	23	40

- Date: November 28, 1901
- Location: Polo Grounds •New York, NY
- Game attendance: 6,000
- Referee: J. C. McCracken (Penn)

Columbia rolled up its largest score of the season, defeating the Carlisle Indians 40 to 12. It was 40 to 0 until the final five minutes. Starring in the contest was Columbia's backfield of Bill Morley, Harold Weekes, Richard Shore Smith, and Chauncey L. Berrien.

== After the season ==
In his review of the 1901 football season, Charles Edward Patterson wrote: "Morley, stocky, muscular, not to be denied his two yards help or no help (and three times two means six, or a first down, you know!) able to repeat indefinitely, the best interferer in present day football, a forty yard punter and a drop-kicker who can actually score."

Morley took over as the team's head coach the following year.

== Players ==
=== Line ===
- Edward Bright Bruce, tackle

=== Backfield ===
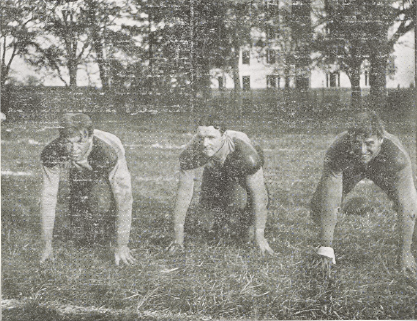
Morley, Weekes, and Berrien.

Player	Position
Chauncey L. Berrien	fullback
Bill Morley	quarterback
Richard Shore Smith	halfback
Harold Weekes	halfback

=== Subs ===
- H. Van. Hoevenberg, quarterback
