= 1901 New Hampshire football team =

American college football season

1901 New Hampshire football
- Conference: Independent
- Record: 0–6
- Head coach: None (Note: While no coach is listed in the University's media guide, The New Hampshire College Monthly made several mentions of a coach, W. R. Crowell, "an ex-Dartmouth football player.")
- Captain: Jenness S. Dearborn
- Home stadium: College grounds, Durham, NH

1901 Eastern college football independents records
	Conf.			Overall
Team	W	L	T	W		L		T
Harvard		–		12	–	0	–	0
Yale		–		11	–	1	–	1
Cornell		–		11	–	1	–	0
Dartmouth		–		10	–	1	–	0
Massachusetts		–		9	–	1	–	0
Princeton		–		9	–	1	–	1
Syracuse		–		7	–	1	–	0
Geneva		–		7	–	1	–	1
Holy Cross		–		7	–	1	–	1
Army		–		5	–	1	–	2
Western U. of Penn		–		7	–	2	–	1
Lafayette		–		9	–	3	–	0
Swarthmore		–		8	–	2	–	2
Washington & Jefferson		–		6	–	2	–	2
Franklin & Marshall		–		7	–	3	–	1
Penn		–		10	–	5	–	0
Buffalo		–		4	–	2	–	0
Columbia		–		8	–	5	–	0
Fordham		–		2	–	1	–	1
Penn State		–		5	–	3	–	0
Bucknell		–		6	–	4	–	0
Temple		–		3	–	2	–	0
NYU		–		4	–	3	–	1
Pittsburgh College		–		3	–	3	–	0
Tufts		–		6	–	6	–	1
Vermont		–		5	–	5	–	1
Carlisle		–		5	–	7	–	1
Dickinson		–		4	–	6	–	0
Brown		–		4	–	7	–	1
Villanova		–		2	–	3	–	0
Drexel		–		2	–	5	–	1
Colgate		–		2	–	5	–	0
Boston College		–		1	–	8	–	0
Lehigh		–		1	–	11	–	0
New Hampshire		–		0	–	6	–	0
Rutgers		–		0	–	7	–	0

The 1901 New Hampshire football team (Note: The school did not adopt the Wildcats nickname until February 1926; before then, they were generally referred to as "the blue and white".) was an American football team that represented New Hampshire College of Agriculture and the Mechanic Arts (Note: The school was often referred to as New Hampshire College or New Hampshire State College in newspapers of the era.) during the 1901 college football season—the school became the University of New Hampshire in 1923. The team finished with a record of 0–6, and did not score any points during the season.

== Schedule ==
Scoring during this era awarded five points for a touchdown, one point for a conversion kick (extra point), and five points for a field goal. Teams played in the one-platoon system and the forward pass was not yet legal. Games were played in two halves rather than four quarters.

Date	Opponent	Site	Result	Source
September 21	at Exeter Academy	Exeter, NH	L 0–6	
September 28	at Bowdoin	Whittier Field; Brunswick, ME	L 0–48	
October 2	at Dartmouth	Alumni Oval; Hanover, NH (rivalry)	L 0–51	
October 19	at Colby	Waterville, ME	L 0–34	
October 24	Colby	Durham, NH	L 0–12	
October 26	Boston College	Durham, NH	L 0–17	

The team's original schedule had included games against Burdett College, Tufts, and MIT.

The October 2 contest was the first game of the Dartmouth–New Hampshire football rivalry.

In addition to the varsity games listed above, New Hampshire's second team (reserves) defeated South Berwick Academy, 11–6, and lost to a team of Exeter Academy juniors, 23–0. A team of New Hampshire freshmen defeated Newmarket High School, 22–0.
