= 1901 Dartmouth football team =

American college football season

1901 Dartmouth football
- Conference: Independent
- Record: 10–1
- Head coach: Walter McCornack (1st season)
- Home stadium: Alumni Oval

1901 Eastern college football independents records
| | Conf. | | | Overall |
| Team | W | L | T | W | | L | | T |
|---|---|---|---|---|---|---|---|---|
| Harvard | | – | | 12 | – | 0 | – | 0 |
| Yale | | – | | 11 | – | 1 | – | 1 |
| Cornell | | – | | 11 | – | 1 | – | 0 |
| Dartmouth | | – | | 10 | – | 1 | – | 0 |
| Massachusetts | | – | | 9 | – | 1 | – | 0 |
| Princeton | | – | | 9 | – | 1 | – | 1 |
| Syracuse | | – | | 7 | – | 1 | – | 0 |
| Geneva | | – | | 7 | – | 1 | – | 1 |
| Holy Cross | | – | | 7 | – | 1 | – | 1 |
| Army | | – | | 5 | – | 1 | – | 2 |
| Western U. of Penn | | – | | 7 | – | 2 | – | 1 |
| Lafayette | | – | | 9 | – | 3 | – | 0 |
| Swarthmore | | – | | 8 | – | 2 | – | 2 |
| Washington & Jefferson | | – | | 6 | – | 2 | – | 2 |
| Franklin & Marshall | | – | | 7 | – | 3 | – | 1 |
| Penn | | – | | 10 | – | 5 | – | 0 |
| Buffalo | | – | | 4 | – | 2 | – | 0 |
| Columbia | | – | | 8 | – | 5 | – | 0 |
| Fordham | | – | | 2 | – | 1 | – | 1 |
| Penn State | | – | | 5 | – | 3 | – | 0 |
| Bucknell | | – | | 6 | – | 4 | – | 0 |
| Temple | | – | | 3 | – | 2 | – | 0 |
| NYU | | – | | 4 | – | 3 | – | 1 |
| Pittsburgh College | | – | | 3 | – | 3 | – | 0 |
| Tufts | | – | | 6 | – | 6 | – | 1 |
| Vermont | | – | | 5 | – | 5 | – | 1 |
| Carlisle | | – | | 5 | – | 7 | – | 1 |
| Dickinson | | – | | 4 | – | 6 | – | 0 |
| Brown | | – | | 4 | – | 7 | – | 1 |
| Villanova | | – | | 2 | – | 3 | – | 0 |
| Drexel | | – | | 2 | – | 5 | – | 1 |
| Colgate | | – | | 2 | – | 5 | – | 0 |
| Boston College | | – | | 1 | – | 8 | – | 0 |
| Lehigh | | – | | 1 | – | 11 | – | 0 |
| New Hampshire | | – | | 0 | – | 6 | – | 0 |
| Rutgers | | – | | 0 | – | 7 | – | 0 |

The 1901 Dartmouth football team was an American football team that represented Dartmouth College as an independent during the 1901 college football season. In its first season under head coach Walter McCornack, the team compiled a 10–1 record and outscored opponents by a total of 296 to 47. The team played its home games at the Alumni Oval in Hanover, New Hampshire.

== Schedule ==
| Date | Time | Opponent | Site | Result | Attendance | Source |
|---|---|---|---|---|---|---|
| October 2 | | New Hampshire | Alumni Oval; Hanover, NH (rivalry) | W 51–0 | | |
| October 5 | | Trinity (CT) | Alumni Oval; Hanover, NH | W 23–0 | | |
| October 9 | | Boston College | Alumni Oval; Hanover, NH | W 50–0 | | |
| October 12 | | Tufts | Alumni Oval; Hanover, NH | W 22–0 | | |
| October 19 | 3:00 p.m. | vs. Williams | Newton Athletic Club gridiron; Newton, MA | W 6–2 | | |
| October 26 | | vs. Bowdoin | Portland, ME | W 35–6 | 3,500 | |
| November 2 | | Wesleyan | Alumni Oval; Hanover, NH | W 29–12 | | |
| November 9 | | Vermont | Alumni Oval; Hanover, NH | W 22–0 | | |
| November 16 | | at Harvard | Soldier's Field; Cambridge, MA | L 12–27 | | |
| November 23 | | at St. Paul's School (NH) | Concord, NH | W 24–0 | | |
| November 27 | | at Brown | Andrews Field; Providence, RI | W 22–0 | | |
