= George Lee (American football) =

American football player and medical doctor (1873–1927)

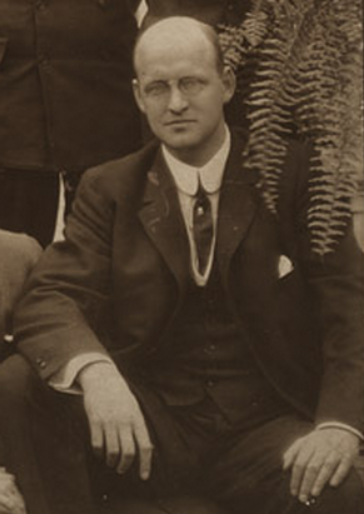
- Lee at Harvard reunion, 1909

Profile
- Position: Guard

Personal information
- Born: November 2, 1873; Leavenworth, Kansas, U.S.
- Died: February 11, 1927 (aged 53); Chicago, Illinois, U.S.

Career information
- College: Harvard (1900–1901)

Awards and highlights
- Consensus All-American (1901)

William George Lee (November 2, 1873 – February 10, 1927) was an American college football player and medical doctor. He played for the Harvard Crimson football team while attending Harvard Medical School and was a consensus selection at the guard position on the 1901 College Football All-America Team.

Lee began his college education at Northwestern University. He transferred to Harvard College in 1899. During the fall of 1899, he was ineligible to play for the Harvard Crimson football team, but he did play for the "scrub" team in 1900 and, based on his play with the scrubs, was "acknowledged one of the best guards Harvard has had for years."

In 1901, Lee, at age 28, became eligible for the football team. He played at the left guard position for the 1901 Harvard Crimson football team that compiled an undefeated 12–0 record and outscored its opponents 205 to 44. After Harvard defeated rival Yale, 22–0, the Boston Daily Globe praised Lee's work:

"[T]here is no lad in that Harvard eleven to whom I would sooner take off my hat to than to George Lee. His is the spirit which wins in the long run, and by the way, Harvard won yesterday simply because they had 10 men with the same spirit that animated Lee."

Eight of the eleven starters on the 1901 Harvard team, including Lee, were selected as consensus first-team selections for the 1901 College Football All-America Team. After the 1901 season, Lee was determined to be ineligible for the 1902 season under "the four-year rule", limiting a student-athlete to no more than four years of college football.

Lee graduated cum laude with an M.D. degree from Harvard in 1904. He returned to Chicago where he established a medical practice. He died there in 1927 at the age of 53.
