= 1901 Pittsburgh College football team =

American college football season

1901 Pittsburgh College football
- Conference: Independent
- Record: 3–3
- Head coach: Unknown

1901 Eastern college football independents records
	Conf.			Overall
Team	W	L	T	W		L		T
Harvard		–		12	–	0	–	0
Yale		–		11	–	1	–	1
Cornell		–		11	–	1	–	0
Dartmouth		–		10	–	1	–	0
Massachusetts		–		9	–	1	–	0
Princeton		–		9	–	1	–	1
Syracuse		–		7	–	1	–	0
Geneva		–		7	–	1	–	1
Holy Cross		–		7	–	1	–	1
Army		–		5	–	1	–	2
Western U. of Penn		–		7	–	2	–	1
Lafayette		–		9	–	3	–	0
Swarthmore		–		8	–	2	–	2
Washington & Jefferson		–		6	–	2	–	2
Franklin & Marshall		–		7	–	3	–	1
Penn		–		10	–	5	–	0
Buffalo		–		4	–	2	–	0
Columbia		–		8	–	5	–	0
Fordham		–		2	–	1	–	1
Penn State		–		5	–	3	–	0
Bucknell		–		6	–	4	–	0
Temple		–		3	–	2	–	0
NYU		–		4	–	3	–	1
Pittsburgh College		–		3	–	3	–	0
Tufts		–		6	–	6	–	1
Vermont		–		5	–	5	–	1
Carlisle		–		5	–	7	–	1
Dickinson		–		4	–	6	–	0
Brown		–		4	–	7	–	1
Villanova		–		2	–	3	–	0
Drexel		–		2	–	5	–	1
Colgate		–		2	–	5	–	0
Boston College		–		1	–	8	–	0
Lehigh		–		1	–	11	–	0
New Hampshire		–		0	–	6	–	0
Rutgers		–		0	–	7	–	0

The 1901 Pittsburgh College football team was an American football team that represented Pittsburgh Catholic College of the Holy Ghost—now known as Duquesne University—during the 1901 college football season. The team finished the season with a record of 3–3.

== Schedule ==
Date	Opponent	Site	Result	Attendance	Source
October 5	Geneva	Bluff field; Pittsburgh, PA	L 0–28		
October 12	at National Athletic Club	East Liverpool, OH	W 23–5		
October 19	Allegheny Athletic Association	Bluff field; Pittsburgh, PA	W 17–0		
October 26	at Western University of Pennsylvania	Schenley Park; Pittsburgh, PA	L 0–18	3,000	
November 5	at Geneva	Geneva Athletic Park; Beaver Falls, PA	L 0–12	800	
November 9	at California Normal (PA)	California Normal athletic grounds; California, PA	W 5–0		
