= 1901 Princeton Tigers football team =

American college football season

1901 Princeton Tigers football
- Conference: Independent
- Record: 9–1–1
- Head coach: Langdon Lea (1st season)
- Captain: Williamson Pell
- Home stadium: University Field

1901 Eastern college football independents records
	Conf.			Overall
Team	W	L	T	W		L		T
Harvard		–		12	–	0	–	0
Yale		–		11	–	1	–	1
Cornell		–		11	–	1	–	0
Dartmouth		–		10	–	1	–	0
Massachusetts		–		9	–	1	–	0
Princeton		–		9	–	1	–	1
Syracuse		–		7	–	1	–	0
Geneva		–		7	–	1	–	1
Holy Cross		–		7	–	1	–	1
Army		–		5	–	1	–	2
Western U. of Penn		–		7	–	2	–	1
Lafayette		–		9	–	3	–	0
Swarthmore		–		8	–	2	–	2
Washington & Jefferson		–		6	–	2	–	2
Frankin & Marshall		–		7	–	3	–	1
Penn		–		10	–	5	–	0
Buffalo		–		4	–	2	–	0
Columbia		–		8	–	5	–	0
Fordham		–		2	–	1	–	1
Penn State		–		5	–	3	–	0
Bucknell		–		6	–	4	–	0
Temple		–		3	–	2	–	0
NYU		–		4	–	3	–	1
Pittsburgh College		–		3	–	3	–	0
Tufts		–		6	–	6	–	1
Vermont		–		5	–	5	–	1
Carlisle		–		5	–	7	–	1
Dickinson		–		4	–	6	–	0
Brown		–		4	–	7	–	1
Villanova		–		2	–	3	–	0
Drexel		–		2	–	5	–	1
Colgate		–		2	–	5	–	0
Boston College		–		1	–	8	–	0
Lehigh		–		1	–	11	–	0
New Hampshire		–		0	–	6	–	0
Rutgers		–		0	–	7	–	0

The 1901 Princeton Tigers football team represented Princeton University in the 1901 college football season. The team finished with a 9–1–1 record under first-year head coach Langdon Lea. The Tigers won their first nine games, including eight shutouts, and outscored their opponents by a total of 247 to 24. The team's only loss was in the last game of the season by a 12–0 score against Yale. Princeton end Ralph Tipton Davis was selected as a consensus first-team honoree on the 1901 College Football All-America Team.

== Schedule ==
Date	Opponent	Site	Result	Attendance	Source
October 2	Villanova	University Field; Princeton, NJ	W 35–0		
October 5	Haverford	University Field; Princeton, NJ	W 47–0		
October 9	NYU	University Field; Princeton, N	W 23–0		
October 12	Lehigh	University Field; Princeton, NJ	W 35–0		
October 16	Dickinson	University Field; Princeton, NJ	W 23–0		
October 19	Brown	University Field; Princeton, NJ	W 35–0		
October 23	Orange Athletic Club	University Field; Princeton, NJ	W 29–0		
October 26	Lafayette	University Field; Princeton, NJ	W 6–0	3,000	
November 2	at Cornell	Percy Field; Ithaca, NY	W 8–6		
November 9	at Army	The Plain; West Point, NY	T 6–6		
November 16	at Yale	Yale Field; New Haven, CT (rivalry)	L 0–12	> 19,000	
