= 1901 Syracuse Orangemen football team =

American college football season

1901 Syracuse Orangemen football
- Conference: Independent
- Record: 7–1
- Head coach: Edwin Sweetland (2nd season)
- Captain: Lynn Wycoff
- Home stadium: Old Oval

1901 Eastern college football independents records
	Conf.			Overall
Team	W	L	T	W		L		T
Harvard		–		12	–	0	–	0
Yale		–		11	–	1	–	1
Cornell		–		11	–	1	–	0
Dartmouth		–		10	–	1	–	0
Massachusetts		–		9	–	1	–	0
Princeton		–		9	–	1	–	1
Syracuse		–		7	–	1	–	0
Geneva		–		7	–	1	–	1
Holy Cross		–		7	–	1	–	1
Army		–		5	–	1	–	2
Western U. of Penn		–		7	–	2	–	1
Lafayette		–		9	–	3	–	0
Swarthmore		–		8	–	2	–	2
Washington & Jefferson		–		6	–	2	–	2
Franklin & Marshall		–		7	–	3	–	1
Penn		–		10	–	5	–	0
Buffalo		–		4	–	2	–	0
Columbia		–		8	–	5	–	0
Fordham		–		2	–	1	–	1
Penn State		–		5	–	3	–	0
Bucknell		–		6	–	4	–	0
Temple		–		3	–	2	–	0
NYU		–		4	–	3	–	1
Pittsburgh College		–		3	–	3	–	0
Tufts		–		6	–	6	–	1
Vermont		–		5	–	5	–	1
Carlisle		–		5	–	7	–	1
Dickinson		–		4	–	6	–	0
Brown		–		4	–	7	–	1
Villanova		–		2	–	3	–	0
Drexel		–		2	–	5	–	1
Colgate		–		2	–	5	–	0
Boston College		–		1	–	8	–	0
Lehigh		–		1	–	11	–	0
New Hampshire		–		0	–	6	–	0
Rutgers		–		0	–	7	–	0

The 1901 Syracuse Orangemen football team was an American football team that represented Syracuse University as an independent during the 1901 college football season. In its second season under head coach Edwin Sweetland, the team compiled a 7–1 record. Lynn Wycoff was the team captain.

== Schedule ==
Date	Time	Opponent	Site	Result	Attendance	Source
September 21		Cortland	Old Oval; Syracuse, NY	W 35–0		
September 28		RPI	Old Oval; Syracuse, NY	W 26–0		
October 5		at Brown	Andrews Field; Providence, RI	W 20–0	500	
October 12		Lafayette	Old Oval; Syracuse, NY	L 0–5	2,500	
October 19		Clarkson	Old Oval; Syracuse, NY	W 27–0		
October 26	3:30 p.m.	Amherst	Old Oval; Syracuse, NY	W 28–17	5,000	
November 9		at Columbia	Polo Grounds; New York, NY	W 11–5	3,000	
November 20		Vermont	Old Oval; Syracuse, NY	W 38–0	1,000	
