= 1901 Brown Bears football team =

American college football season

1901 Brown Bears football
- Conference: Independent
- Record: 4–7–1
- Head coach: Edward N. Robinson (4th season)
- Captain: William Penn Bates
- Home stadium: Andrews Field

1901 Eastern college football independents records
	Conf.			Overall
Team	W	L	T	W		L		T
Harvard		–		12	–	0	–	0
Yale		–		11	–	1	–	1
Cornell		–		11	–	1	–	0
Dartmouth		–		10	–	1	–	0
Massachusetts		–		9	–	1	–	0
Princeton		–		9	–	1	–	1
Syracuse		–		7	–	1	–	0
Geneva		–		7	–	1	–	1
Holy Cross		–		7	–	1	–	1
Army		–		5	–	1	–	2
Western U. of Penn		–		7	–	2	–	1
Lafayette		–		9	–	3	–	0
Swarthmore		–		8	–	2	–	2
Washington & Jefferson		–		6	–	2	–	2
Franklin & Marshall		–		7	–	3	–	1
Penn		–		10	–	5	–	0
Buffalo		–		4	–	2	–	0
Columbia		–		8	–	5	–	0
Fordham		–		2	–	1	–	1
Penn State		–		5	–	3	–	0
Bucknell		–		6	–	4	–	0
Temple		–		3	–	2	–	0
NYU		–		4	–	3	–	1
Pittsburgh College		–		3	–	3	–	0
Tufts		–		6	–	6	–	1
Vermont		–		5	–	5	–	1
Carlisle		–		5	–	7	–	1
Dickinson		–		4	–	6	–	0
Brown		–		4	–	7	–	1
Villanova		–		2	–	3	–	0
Drexel		–		2	–	5	–	1
Colgate		–		2	–	5	–	0
Boston College		–		1	–	8	–	0
Lehigh		–		1	–	11	–	0
New Hampshire		–		0	–	6	–	0
Rutgers		–		0	–	7	–	0

The 1901 Brown Bears football team was an American football team that represented Brown University as an independent during the 1901 college football season. In its fourth season under head coach Edward N. Robinson, the team compiled a 4–7–1 record and was outscored by a total of 212 to 70. William Penn Bates was the team captain.

The team played its home games at Andrews Field in Providence, Rhode Island.

== Schedule ==
Date	Opponent	Site	Result	Attendance	Source
September 28	Boston College	Andrews Field; Providence, RI	W 12–0		
October 2	Colby	Andrews Field; Providence, RI	W 16–0		
October 5	Syracuse	Andrews Field; Providence, RI	L 0–20	500	
October 9	Manhattan College	Andrews Field; Providence, RI	W 6–5		
October 12	at Penn	Franklin Field; Philadelphia, PA	L 0–26	10,000	
October 19	at Princeton	University Field; Princeton, NJ	L 0–35		
October 26	Holy Cross	Andrews Field; Providence, RI	T 6–6		
November 2	at Harvard	Soldier's Field; Cambridge, MA	L 0–48	5,000	
November 5	at Homestead Library & Athletic Club	Exposition Park; Pittsburgh, PA	L 0–34		
November 9	Lafayette	Andrews Field; Providence, RI	L 6–11		
November 16	Union (NY)	Andrews Field; Providence, RI	W 24–5		
November 28	Dartmouth	Andrews Field; Providence, RI	L 0–22	6,000	
