= 1901 Cornell Big Red football team =

American college football season

1901 Cornell Big Red football
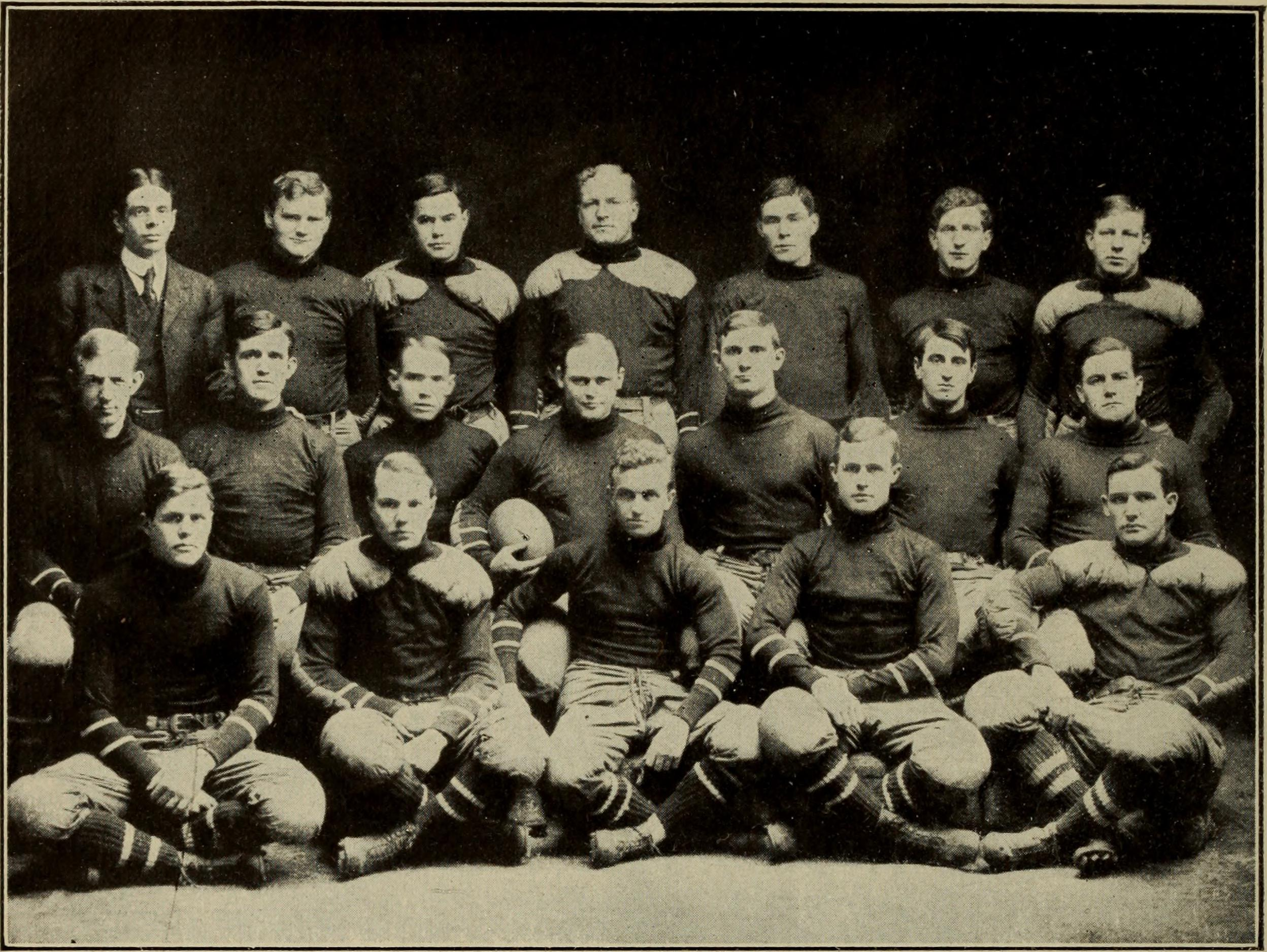
- Conference: Independent
- Record: 11–1
- Head coach: Raymond Starbuck (1st season)
- Captain: Bill Warner
- Home stadium: Percy Field

1901 Eastern college football independents records
	Conf.			Overall
Team	W	L	T	W		L		T
Harvard		–		12	–	0	–	0
Yale		–		11	–	1	–	1
Cornell		–		11	–	1	–	0
Dartmouth		–		10	–	1	–	0
Massachusetts		–		9	–	1	–	0
Princeton		–		9	–	1	–	1
Syracuse		–		7	–	1	–	0
Geneva		–		7	–	1	–	1
Holy Cross		–		7	–	1	–	1
Army		–		5	–	1	–	2
Western U. of Penn		–		7	–	2	–	1
Lafayette		–		9	–	3	–	0
Swarthmore		–		8	–	2	–	2
Washington & Jefferson		–		6	–	2	–	2
Franklin & Marshall		–		7	–	3	–	1
Penn		–		10	–	5	–	0
Buffalo		–		4	–	2	–	0
Columbia		–		8	–	5	–	0
Fordham		–		2	–	1	–	1
Penn State		–		5	–	3	–	0
Bucknell		–		6	–	4	–	0
Temple		–		3	–	2	–	0
NYU		–		4	–	3	–	1
Pittsburgh College		–		3	–	3	–	0
Tufts		–		6	–	6	–	1
Vermont		–		5	–	5	–	1
Carlisle		–		5	–	7	–	1
Dickinson		–		4	–	6	–	0
Brown		–		4	–	7	–	1
Villanova		–		2	–	3	–	0
Drexel		–		2	–	5	–	1
Colgate		–		2	–	5	–	0
Boston College		–		1	–	8	–	0
Lehigh		–		1	–	11	–	0
New Hampshire		–		0	–	6	–	0
Rutgers		–		0	–	7	–	0

The 1901 Cornell Big Red football team was an American football team that represented Cornell University during the 1901 college football season. In its first season under head coach Raymond Starbuck, the team compiled an 11–1 record, shut out 10 of 12 opponents, and outscored all opponents by a combined total of 333 to 14. The only loss was by an 8–6 score against Princeton.

Five Cornell players received honors on the 1901 College Football All-America Team: guards Bill Warner (Walter Camp-1) and Sanford Hunt (Camp-2, Caspar Whitney-1); quarterback Alfred A. Brewster, Jr. (Whitney-2); halfback Henry Purcell (Camp-2); and fullback Henry Schoellkopf (Camp-3).

== Schedule ==
Date	Opponent	Site	Result	Attendance	Source
September 28	Colgate	Percy Field; Ithaca, NY (rivalry)	W 17–0	1,000	
October 2	Rochester	Percy Field; Ithaca, NY	W 50–0		
October 5	Bucknell	Percy Field; Ithaca, NY	W 6–0		
October 9	Hamilton	Percy Field; Ithaca, NY	W 39–0		
October 12	Union (NY)	Percy Field; Ithaca, NY	W 24–0		
October 19	vs. Carlisle	Stadium of the Pan-American Exposition; Buffalo, NY	W 17–0	18,000	
October 26	Oberlin	Percy Field; Ithaca, NY	W 29–0		
November 2	Princeton	Percy Field; Ithaca, NY	L 6–8		
November 9	Lehigh	Percy Field; Ithaca, NY	W 30–0		
November 16	at Columbia	Polo Grounds; New York, NY (rivalry)	W 24–0		
November 23	Vermont	Percy Field; Ithaca, NY	W 68–0		
November 28	at Penn	Franklin Field; Philadelphia, PA (rivalry)	W 23–6	18,000	
