= 1901 Buffalo football team =

American college football season

1901 Buffalo football
- Conference: Independent
- Record: 4–2
- Head coach: James B. "Turk" Gordon (1st season)
- Captain: Charles Hasse
- Home stadium: Pan-American Exposition Stadium, Buffalo Athletic Field

1901 Eastern college football independents records
	Conf.			Overall
Team	W	L	T	W		L		T
Harvard		–		12	–	0	–	0
Yale		–		11	–	1	–	1
Cornell		–		11	–	1	–	0
Dartmouth		–		10	–	1	–	0
Massachusetts		–		9	–	1	–	0
Princeton		–		9	–	1	–	1
Syracuse		–		7	–	1	–	0
Geneva		–		7	–	1	–	1
Holy Cross		–		7	–	1	–	1
Army		–		5	–	1	–	2
Western U. of Penn		–		7	–	2	–	1
Lafayette		–		9	–	3	–	0
Swarthmore		–		8	–	2	–	2
Washington & Jefferson		–		6	–	2	–	2
Franklin & Marshall		–		7	–	3	–	1
Penn		–		10	–	5	–	0
Buffalo		–		4	–	2	–	0
Columbia		–		8	–	5	–	0
Fordham		–		2	–	1	–	1
Penn State		–		5	–	3	–	0
Bucknell		–		6	–	4	–	0
Temple		–		3	–	2	–	0
NYU		–		4	–	3	–	1
Pittsburgh College		–		3	–	3	–	0
Tufts		–		6	–	6	–	1
Vermont		–		5	–	5	–	1
Carlisle		–		5	–	7	–	1
Dickinson		–		4	–	6	–	0
Brown		–		4	–	7	–	1
Villanova		–		2	–	3	–	0
Drexel		–		2	–	5	–	1
Colgate		–		2	–	5	–	0
Boston College		–		1	–	8	–	0
Lehigh		–		1	–	11	–	0
New Hampshire		–		0	–	6	–	0
Rutgers		–		0	–	7	–	0

The 1901 Buffalo football team represented the University of Buffalo as an independent during the 1901 college football season. In its first season under head coach James B. "Turk" Gordon, the team compiled a 4–2 record. Five games were canceled.

== Schedule ==
Date	Time	Opponent	Site	Result	Attendance	Source
September 28	3:00 p.m.	Columbia	Pan-American Exposition Stadium; Buffalo, NY	W 5–0	7,000–8,000	
October 5	3:10 p.m.	Lehigh	Pan-American Exposition Stadium; Buffalo, NY	W 16–0	8,000	
October 12		Case	Buffalo Athletic Field; Buffalo, NY	W 6–0		
October 17	3:00 p.m.	Oberlin	Pan-American Exposition Stadium; Buffalo, NY	W 5–0		
October 23		Hobart	Buffalo, NY	Canceled		
October 26		at Michigan	Regents Field; Ann Arbor, MI	L 0–128		
November 2		Colgate	Buffalo, NY	Canceled		
November 9		at Western Reserve	Cleveland, OH	L 6–17		
November 16		at Syracuse	Syracuse, NY	Canceled		
November 23		Bucknell	Buffalo, NY	Canceled		
November 28		Penn State	Buffalo, NY	Canceled		
