= 1901 Villanova Wildcats football team =

American college football season

1901 Villanova Wildcats football
- Conference: Independent
- Record: 2–3
- Head coach: John F. Bagley / John J. Egan
- Captain: John J. Egan

1901 Eastern college football independents records
	Conf.			Overall
Team	W	L	T	W		L		T
Harvard		–		12	–	0	–	0
Yale		–		11	–	1	–	1
Cornell		–		11	–	1	–	0
Dartmouth		–		10	–	1	–	0
Massachusetts		–		9	–	1	–	0
Princeton		–		9	–	1	–	1
Syracuse		–		7	–	1	–	0
Geneva		–		7	–	1	–	1
Holy Cross		–		7	–	1	–	1
Army		–		5	–	1	–	2
Western U. of Penn		–		7	–	2	–	1
Lafayette		–		9	–	3	–	0
Swarthmore		–		8	–	2	–	2
Washington & Jefferson		–		6	–	2	–	2
Franklin & Marshall		–		7	–	3	–	1
Penn		–		10	–	5	–	0
Buffalo		–		4	–	2	–	0
Columbia		–		8	–	5	–	0
Fordham		–		2	–	1	–	1
Penn State		–		5	–	3	–	0
Bucknell		–		6	–	4	–	0
Temple		–		3	–	2	–	0
NYU		–		4	–	3	–	1
Pittsburgh College		–		3	–	3	–	0
Tufts		–		6	–	6	–	1
Vermont		–		5	–	5	–	1
Carlisle		–		5	–	7	–	1
Dickinson		–		4	–	6	–	0
Brown		–		4	–	7	–	1
Villanova		–		2	–	3	–	0
Drexel		–		2	–	5	–	1
Colgate		–		2	–	5	–	0
Boston College		–		1	–	8	–	0
Lehigh		–		1	–	11	–	0
New Hampshire		–		0	–	6	–	0
Rutgers		–		0	–	7	–	0

The 1901 Villanova Wildcats football team was an American football team that represented Villanova University as an independent during the 1901 college football season. The team compiled a 2–3 record. A September 1901 account in The Philadelphia Inquirer identified John F. Bagley as the team's coach. However, the Villanova Football Media Guide identifies John J. Egan as the coach. Egan was also a player on the team.

== Schedule ==
Date	Time	Opponent	Site	Result	Attendance	Source
October 2		at Princeton	University Field; Princeton, NJ	L 0–35		
October 19		at Franklin & Marshall	Lancaster, PA	W 12–11		
October 23		at Gallaudet	Kendall Green; Washington, D.C.	L 0–12		
November 2		at The Hill School	Pottstown, PA	L 5–11		
November 28	2:30 p.m.	at Steelton Y. M. C. A.	Steelton, PA	W 5–0	3,000	
All times are in Eastern time
