= 1901 Penn State football team =

American college football season

1901 Penn State football
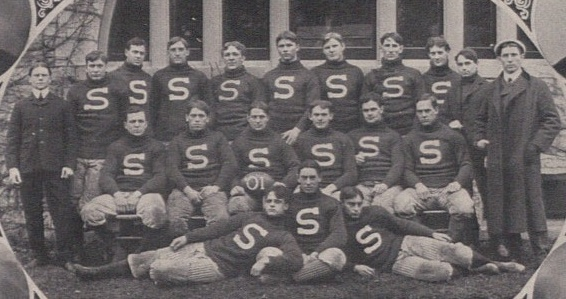
- Conference: Independent
- Record: 5–3
- Head coach: Pop Golden (2nd season)
- Captain: Earl Hewitt
- Home stadium: Beaver Field

1901 Eastern college football independents records
	Conf.			Overall
Team	W	L	T	W		L		T
Harvard		–		12	–	0	–	0
Yale		–		11	–	1	–	1
Cornell		–		11	–	1	–	0
Dartmouth		–		10	–	1	–	0
Massachusetts		–		9	–	1	–	0
Princeton		–		9	–	1	–	1
Syracuse		–		7	–	1	–	0
Geneva		–		7	–	1	–	1
Holy Cross		–		7	–	1	–	1
Army		–		5	–	1	–	2
Western U. of Penn		–		7	–	2	–	1
Lafayette		–		9	–	3	–	0
Swarthmore		–		8	–	2	–	2
Washington & Jefferson		–		6	–	2	–	2
Franklin & Marshall		–		7	–	3	–	1
Penn		–		10	–	5	–	0
Buffalo		–		4	–	2	–	0
Columbia		–		8	–	5	–	0
Fordham		–		2	–	1	–	1
Penn State		–		5	–	3	–	0
Bucknell		–		6	–	4	–	0
Temple		–		3	–	2	–	0
NYU		–		4	–	3	–	1
Pittsburgh College		–		3	–	3	–	0
Tufts		–		6	–	6	–	1
Vermont		–		5	–	5	–	1
Carlisle		–		5	–	7	–	1
Dickinson		–		4	–	6	–	0
Brown		–		4	–	7	–	1
Villanova		–		2	–	3	–	0
Drexel		–		2	–	5	–	1
Colgate		–		2	–	5	–	0
Boston College		–		1	–	8	–	0
Lehigh		–		1	–	11	–	0
New Hampshire		–		0	–	6	–	0
Rutgers		–		0	–	7	–	0

The 1901 Penn State football team was an American football team that represented Pennsylvania State College—now known as Pennsylvania State University–as an independent during the 1901 college football season. The team was coached by Pop Golden and played its home games in Beaver Field in State College, Pennsylvania.

== Schedule ==
Date	Opponent	Site	Result	Attendance	Source
September 22	Susquehanna	Beaver Field; State College, PA	W 17–0		
September 29	vs. Western University of Pennsylvania	Bellefonte, PA (rivalry)	W 37–0		
October 5	at Penn	Franklin Field; Philadelphia, PA	L 6–23		
October 19	at Yale	Yale Field; New Haven, CT	L 0–22		
October 26	at Navy	Worden Field; Annapolis, MD	W 11–6		
November 2	at Homestead Library & Athletic Club	Exposition Park; Allegheny City, PA	L 0–39		
November 16	vs. Lehigh	Williamsport, PA	W 38–0	1,500	
November 23	Dickinson	Beaver Field; State College, PA	W 12–0	1,500	
