= 1901 Geneva Covenanters football team =

American college football season

1901 Geneva Covenanters football
- Conference: Independent
- Record: 7–1–1
- Head coach: Samuel G. Craig (2nd season)
- Captain: Joseph H. Thompson
- Home stadium: Geneva Athletic Park

1901 Eastern college football independents records
| | Conf. | | | Overall |
| Team | W | L | T | W | | L | | T |
|---|---|---|---|---|---|---|---|---|
| Harvard | | – | | 12 | – | 0 | – | 0 |
| Yale | | – | | 11 | – | 1 | – | 1 |
| Cornell | | – | | 11 | – | 1 | – | 0 |
| Dartmouth | | – | | 10 | – | 1 | – | 0 |
| Massachusetts | | – | | 9 | – | 1 | – | 0 |
| Princeton | | – | | 9 | – | 1 | – | 1 |
| Syracuse | | – | | 7 | – | 1 | – | 0 |
| Geneva | | – | | 7 | – | 1 | – | 1 |
| Holy Cross | | – | | 7 | – | 1 | – | 1 |
| Army | | – | | 5 | – | 1 | – | 2 |
| Western U. of Penn | | – | | 7 | – | 2 | – | 1 |
| Lafayette | | – | | 9 | – | 3 | – | 0 |
| Swarthmore | | – | | 8 | – | 2 | – | 2 |
| Washington & Jefferson | | – | | 6 | – | 2 | – | 2 |
| Franklin & Marshall | | – | | 7 | – | 3 | – | 1 |
| Penn | | – | | 10 | – | 5 | – | 0 |
| Buffalo | | – | | 4 | – | 2 | – | 0 |
| Columbia | | – | | 8 | – | 5 | – | 0 |
| Fordham | | – | | 2 | – | 1 | – | 1 |
| Penn State | | – | | 5 | – | 3 | – | 0 |
| Bucknell | | – | | 6 | – | 4 | – | 0 |
| Temple | | – | | 3 | – | 2 | – | 0 |
| NYU | | – | | 4 | – | 3 | – | 1 |
| Pittsburgh College | | – | | 3 | – | 3 | – | 0 |
| Tufts | | – | | 6 | – | 6 | – | 1 |
| Vermont | | – | | 5 | – | 5 | – | 1 |
| Carlisle | | – | | 5 | – | 7 | – | 1 |
| Dickinson | | – | | 4 | – | 6 | – | 0 |
| Brown | | – | | 4 | – | 7 | – | 1 |
| Villanova | | – | | 2 | – | 3 | – | 0 |
| Drexel | | – | | 2 | – | 5 | – | 1 |
| Colgate | | – | | 2 | – | 5 | – | 0 |
| Boston College | | – | | 1 | – | 8 | – | 0 |
| Lehigh | | – | | 1 | – | 11 | – | 0 |
| New Hampshire | | – | | 0 | – | 6 | – | 0 |
| Rutgers | | – | | 0 | – | 7 | – | 0 |

The 1901 Geneva Covenanters football team was an American football team that represented Geneva College as an independent during the 1901 college football season. In its second season under head coach Samuel G. Craig, the team compiled a 7–1–1 record. The team's captain was Joseph H. Thompson.

== Schedule ==
| Date | Opponent | Site | Result | Attendance | Source |
|---|---|---|---|---|---|
| September 28 | Geneva alumni | Geneva Athletic Park; Beaver Falls, PA | T 0–0 | | |
| October 5 | Pittsburgh College | Pittsburgh, PA | W 28–0 | | |
| October 12 | Allegheny | Meadville, PA | W 11–0 | 600 | |
| October 19 | Westminster (PA) | Geneva Athletic Park; Beaver Falls, PA | W 23–0 | 800 | |
| October 26 | Grove City | Grove City, PA | W 15–6 | | |
| November 2 | Allegheny | Geneva Athletic Park; Beaver Falls, PA | W 34–0 | 3,000 | |
| November 5 | Pittsburgh College | Geneva Athletic Park; Beaver Falls, PA | W 12–0 | 800 | |
| November 9 | Western University of Pennsylvania | Geneva Athletic Park; Beaver Falls, PA | L 5–12 | 500 | |
| November 23 | Grove City | Geneva Athletic Park; Beaver Falls, PA | W 11–6 | | |
