= 1901 Massachusetts Aggies football team =

American college football season

1901 Massachusetts Aggies football
- Conference: Athletic League of New England State Colleges
- Record: 9–1 ( Athletic League of New England State Colleges)
- Head coach: James Halligan (1st season)
- Home stadium: Alumni Field

1901 Eastern college football independents records
	Conf.			Overall
Team	W	L	T	W		L		T
Harvard		–		12	–	0	–	0
Yale		–		11	–	1	–	1
Cornell		–		11	–	1	–	0
Dartmouth		–		10	–	1	–	0
Massachusetts		–		9	–	1	–	0
Princeton		–		9	–	1	–	1
Syracuse		–		7	–	1	–	0
Geneva		–		7	–	1	–	1
Holy Cross		–		7	–	1	–	1
Army		–		5	–	1	–	2
Western U. of Penn		–		7	–	2	–	1
Lafayette		–		9	–	3	–	0
Swarthmore		–		8	–	2	–	2
Washington & Jefferson		–		6	–	2	–	2
Franklin & Marshall		–		7	–	3	–	1
Penn		–		10	–	5	–	0
Buffalo		–		4	–	2	–	0
Columbia		–		8	–	5	–	0
Fordham		–		2	–	1	–	1
Penn State		–		5	–	3	–	0
Bucknell		–		6	–	4	–	0
Temple		–		3	–	2	–	0
NYU		–		4	–	3	–	1
Pittsburgh College		–		3	–	3	–	0
Tufts		–		6	–	6	–	1
Vermont		–		5	–	5	–	1
Carlisle		–		5	–	7	–	1
Dickinson		–		4	–	6	–	0
Brown		–		4	–	7	–	1
Villanova		–		2	–	3	–	0
Drexel		–		2	–	5	–	1
Colgate		–		2	–	5	–	0
Boston College		–		1	–	8	–	0
Lehigh		–		1	–	11	–	0
New Hampshire		–		0	–	6	–	0
Rutgers		–		0	–	7	–	0

The 1901 Massachusetts Aggies football team was an American football team that represented Massachusetts Agricultural College in the 1901 college football season. The team was coached by James Halligan and played its home games at Alumni Field in Amherst, Massachusetts. The 1901 season was Halligan's first as head coach of the Aggies. Massachusetts finished the season with a record of 9–1.

== Schedule ==
Date	Opponent	Site	Result	Source
September 28	at Holy Cross	Worcester College Grounds; Worcester, MA	W 17–0	
October 5	at Pittsfield A.C.	Pittsfield, MA	W 6–0	
October 12	at Wesleyan	Andrus Field; Middletown, CT	W 6–0	
October 16	at Williams	Weston Field; Williamstown, MA	L 0–17	
October 19	at Worcester Tech	Worcester, MA	W 18–12	
October 24	at Bates	Garcelon Field; Lewiston, ME	W 6–1	
November 2	Springfield Training School	Alumni Field; Amherst, MA	W 10–0	
November 9	at Amherst	Pratt Field; Amherst, MA	W 15–0	
November 22	at Tufts	Tufts Oval; Medford, MA	W 6–0	
November 28	at Boston College	American League Baseball Grounds; Boston, MA (rivalry)	W 11–0	
