= 1901 Drexel Dragons football team =

American collegiate football season

1901 Drexel Dragons football
- Conference: Independent
- Record: 2–5–1
- Head coach: None

1901 Eastern college football independents records
| | Conf. | | | Overall |
| Team | W | L | T | W | | L | | T |
|---|---|---|---|---|---|---|---|---|
| Harvard | | – | | 12 | – | 0 | – | 0 |
| Yale | | – | | 11 | – | 1 | – | 1 |
| Cornell | | – | | 11 | – | 1 | – | 0 |
| Dartmouth | | – | | 10 | – | 1 | – | 0 |
| Massachusetts | | – | | 9 | – | 1 | – | 0 |
| Princeton | | – | | 9 | – | 1 | – | 1 |
| Syracuse | | – | | 7 | – | 1 | – | 0 |
| Geneva | | – | | 7 | – | 1 | – | 1 |
| Holy Cross | | – | | 7 | – | 1 | – | 1 |
| Army | | – | | 5 | – | 1 | – | 2 |
| Western U. of Penn | | – | | 7 | – | 2 | – | 1 |
| Lafayette | | – | | 9 | – | 3 | – | 0 |
| Swarthmore | | – | | 8 | – | 2 | – | 2 |
| Washington & Jefferson | | – | | 6 | – | 2 | – | 2 |
| Franklin & Marshall | | – | | 7 | – | 3 | – | 1 |
| Penn | | – | | 10 | – | 5 | – | 0 |
| Buffalo | | – | | 4 | – | 2 | – | 0 |
| Columbia | | – | | 8 | – | 5 | – | 0 |
| Fordham | | – | | 2 | – | 1 | – | 1 |
| Penn State | | – | | 5 | – | 3 | – | 0 |
| Bucknell | | – | | 6 | – | 4 | – | 0 |
| Temple | | – | | 3 | – | 2 | – | 0 |
| NYU | | – | | 4 | – | 3 | – | 1 |
| Pittsburgh College | | – | | 3 | – | 3 | – | 0 |
| Tufts | | – | | 6 | – | 6 | – | 1 |
| Vermont | | – | | 5 | – | 5 | – | 1 |
| Carlisle | | – | | 5 | – | 7 | – | 1 |
| Dickinson | | – | | 4 | – | 6 | – | 0 |
| Brown | | – | | 4 | – | 7 | – | 1 |
| Villanova | | – | | 2 | – | 3 | – | 0 |
| Drexel | | – | | 2 | – | 5 | – | 1 |
| Colgate | | – | | 2 | – | 5 | – | 0 |
| Boston College | | – | | 1 | – | 8 | – | 0 |
| Lehigh | | – | | 1 | – | 11 | – | 0 |
| New Hampshire | | – | | 0 | – | 6 | – | 0 |
| Rutgers | | – | | 0 | – | 7 | – | 0 |

The 1901 Drexel Dragons football team represented the Drexel Institute—now known as Drexel University–as an independent during the 1901 college football season. The team did not have a head coach.

== Schedule ==
| Date | Opponent | Site | Result | Source |
|---|---|---|---|---|
| September 28 | at Pennsylvania Military | Chester, PA | L 5–6 | |
| October 18 | Cheltenham Military Academy | Ogontz School Grounds; Elkins Park, PA | L | |
| October 22 | Episcopal Academy | Tioga; Westmoreland, PA | W 6–0 | |
| October 30 | at Penn Freshman | | L 0–12 | |
| November 8 | Central High School | Tabor; Westmoreland, PA | L 6–18 | |
| Unknown | Philadelphia Pharmacy | YMCA; Philadelphia, PA | L 0–5 | |
| November 15 | at Swarthmore Preparatory School | | Unknown | |
| November 23 | at West Jersey Academy | Bridgeton, NJ | T 0–0 | |
| Unknown | Philadelphia Textile | Westmoreland, PA | W 21–6 | |
