= 1901 Bucknell football team =

American college football season

1901 Bucknell football
- Conference: Independent
- Record: 6–4
- Head coach: George W. Hoskins (3rd season)
- Captain: Frank Stanton

1901 Eastern college football independents records
	Conf.			Overall
Team	W	L	T	W		L		T
Harvard		–		12	–	0	–	0
Yale		–		11	–	1	–	1
Cornell		–		11	–	1	–	0
Dartmouth		–		10	–	1	–	0
Massachusetts		–		9	–	1	–	0
Princeton		–		9	–	1	–	1
Syracuse		–		7	–	1	–	0
Geneva		–		7	–	1	–	1
Holy Cross		–		7	–	1	–	1
Army		–		5	–	1	–	2
Western U. of Penn		–		7	–	2	–	1
Lafayette		–		9	–	3	–	0
Swarthmore		–		8	–	2	–	2
Washington & Jefferson		–		6	–	2	–	2
Franklin & Marshall		–		7	–	3	–	1
Penn		–		10	–	5	–	0
Buffalo		–		4	–	2	–	0
Columbia		–		8	–	5	–	0
Fordham		–		2	–	1	–	1
Penn State		–		5	–	3	–	0
Bucknell		–		6	–	4	–	0
Temple		–		3	–	2	–	0
NYU		–		4	–	3	–	1
Pittsburgh College		–		3	–	3	–	0
Tufts		–		6	–	6	–	1
Vermont		–		5	–	5	–	1
Carlisle		–		5	–	7	–	1
Dickinson		–		4	–	6	–	0
Brown		–		4	–	7	–	1
Villanova		–		2	–	3	–	0
Drexel		–		2	–	5	–	1
Colgate		–		2	–	5	–	0
Boston College		–		1	–	8	–	0
Lehigh		–		1	–	11	–	0
New Hampshire		–		0	–	6	–	0
Rutgers		–		0	–	7	–	0

The 1901 Bucknell football team was an American football team that represented Bucknell University as an independent during the 1901 college football season. In its third season under head coach George W. Hoskins, the team compiled a 6–4 record and outscored opponents by a total of 145 to 46.

== Schedule ==
Date	Opponent	Site	Result	Attendance	Source
September 21	Lewisburg Athletic Club	Lewisburg, PA	W 18–5		
September 28	Wyoming Seminary	Lewisburg, PA	W 5–0		
October 5	at Cornell	Percy Field; Ithaca, NY	L 0–6		
October 12	vs. Carlisle	Indian Field Williamsport, PA	L 5–6	5,000	
October 19	at Penn	Franklin Field; Philadelphia, PA	L 0–6		
October 26	at Lehigh	Bethlehem, PA	W 10–0		
November 2	Gettysburg	Lewisburg, PA	W 51–6		
November 9	at Washington & Jefferson	Washington Fairgrounds; Washington, PA	L 5–11		
November 23	Burlingame Athletic Club	Lewisburg, PA	W 34–0		
November 28	at Athens Athletic Club	Athens Driving Park; Athens, PA	W 17–6		
