= 1901 NYU Violets football team =

American college football season

1901 NYU Violets football
- Conference: Independent
- Record: 4–3–1
- Head coach: W. H. Rorke (1st season)
- Home stadium: Ohio Field

1901 Eastern college football independents records
	Conf.			Overall
Team	W	L	T	W		L		T
Harvard		–		12	–	0	–	0
Yale		–		11	–	1	–	1
Cornell		–		11	–	1	–	0
Dartmouth		–		10	–	1	–	0
Massachusetts		–		9	–	1	–	0
Princeton		–		9	–	1	–	1
Syracuse		–		7	–	1	–	0
Geneva		–		7	–	1	–	1
Holy Cross		–		7	–	1	–	1
Army		–		5	–	1	–	2
Western U. of Penn		–		7	–	2	–	1
Lafayette		–		9	–	3	–	0
Swarthmore		–		8	–	2	–	2
Washington & Jefferson		–		6	–	2	–	2
Franklin & Marshall		–		7	–	3	–	1
Penn		–		10	–	5	–	0
Buffalo		–		4	–	2	–	0
Columbia		–		8	–	5	–	0
Fordham		–		2	–	1	–	1
Penn State		–		5	–	3	–	0
Bucknell		–		6	–	4	–	0
Temple		–		3	–	2	–	0
NYU		–		4	–	3	–	1
Pittsburgh College		–		3	–	3	–	0
Tufts		–		6	–	6	–	1
Vermont		–		5	–	5	–	1
Carlisle		–		5	–	7	–	1
Dickinson		–		4	–	6	–	0
Brown		–		4	–	7	–	1
Villanova		–		2	–	3	–	0
Drexel		–		2	–	5	–	1
Colgate		–		2	–	5	–	0
Boston College		–		1	–	8	–	0
Lehigh		–		1	–	11	–	0
New Hampshire		–		0	–	6	–	0
Rutgers		–		0	–	7	–	0

The 1901 NYU Violets football team was an American football team that represented New York University as an independent during the 1901 college football season. In their first year under head coach W. H. Rorke, the team compiled a 4–3–1 record.

== Schedule ==
Date	Opponent	Site	Result	Source
October 5	at St. Paul's School	Garden City, NY	W 16–0	
October 9	at Princeton	University Field; Princeton, NJ	L 0–23	
October 19	St. Stephen's	Berkeley Oval; New York, NY	W 40–0	
October 26	at Rutgers	Neilson Field; New Brunswick, NJ	W 16–0	
November 5	Bellevue Medical College	Berkeley Oval; New York, NY	L 0–11	
November 9	at Trinity (CT)	Trinity Field; Hartford, CT	L 5–16	
November 16	RPI	Ohio Field; Bronx, NY	W 46–5	
November 23	Union (NY)	Berkeley Oval; New York, NY	T 11–11	
