= 1901 Boston College football team =

American college football season

1901 Boston College football
- Conference: Independent
- Record: 1–8
- Head coach: John Dunlop (4th season)
- Captain: Joe Kenney
- Home stadium: American League Baseball Grounds

1901 Eastern college football independents records
	Conf.			Overall
Team	W	L	T	W		L		T
Harvard		–		12	–	0	–	0
Yale		–		11	–	1	–	1
Cornell		–		11	–	1	–	0
Dartmouth		–		10	–	1	–	0
Massachusetts		–		9	–	1	–	0
Princeton		–		9	–	1	–	1
Syracuse		–		7	–	1	–	0
Geneva		–		7	–	1	–	1
Holy Cross		–		7	–	1	–	1
Army		–		5	–	1	–	2
Western U. of Penn		–		7	–	2	–	1
Lafayette		–		9	–	3	–	0
Swarthmore		–		8	–	2	–	2
Washington & Jefferson		–		6	–	2	–	2
Franklin & Marshall		–		7	–	3	–	1
Penn		–		10	–	5	–	0
Buffalo		–		4	–	2	–	0
Columbia		–		8	–	5	–	0
Fordham		–		2	–	1	–	1
Penn State		–		5	–	3	–	0
Bucknell		–		6	–	4	–	0
Temple		–		3	–	2	–	0
NYU		–		4	–	3	–	1
Pittsburgh College		–		3	–	3	–	0
Tufts		–		6	–	6	–	1
Vermont		–		5	–	5	–	1
Carlisle		–		5	–	7	–	1
Dickinson		–		4	–	6	–	0
Brown		–		4	–	7	–	1
Villanova		–		2	–	3	–	0
Drexel		–		2	–	5	–	1
Colgate		–		2	–	5	–	0
Boston College		–		1	–	8	–	0
Lehigh		–		1	–	11	–	0
New Hampshire		–		0	–	6	–	0
Rutgers		–		0	–	7	–	0

The 1901 Boston College football team was an American football team that represented Boston College as an independent during the 1901 college football season. In its fourth and final season under head coach John Dunlop, the team compiled a 1–8 record. Joe Kenney was the team captain.

== Schedule ==
Date	Opponent	Site	Result	Source
September 28	at Brown	Andrews Field; Providence, RI	L 0–12	
October 9	at Dartmouth	Alumni Oval; Hanover, NH	L 0–45	
October 12	at Bates	Garcelon Field; Lewiston, ME	L 0–6	
October 16	at Exeter Academy	Exeter, NH	L 0–17	
October 26	at New Hampshire	Durham, NH	W 17–0	
October 30	at Andover Academy	Andover, MA	L 0–11	
November 9	at Holy Cross	Worcester College Grounds; Worcester, MA (rivalry)	L 0–11	
November 19	at Tufts	Tufts Oval; Medford, MA	L 0–12	
November 28	Massachusetts	American League Baseball Grounds; Boston, MA (rivalry)	L 0–11	
