= 1901 Washington & Jefferson Red and Black football team =

American college football season

1901 Washington & Jefferson Red and Black football
- Conference: Independent
- Record: 6–2–2
- Head coach: N. S. Knight (1st season)
- Captain: Aiken
- Home stadium: College Park

1901 Eastern college football independents records
	Conf.			Overall
Team	W	L	T	W		L		T
Harvard		–		12	–	0	–	0
Yale		–		11	–	1	–	1
Cornell		–		11	–	1	–	0
Dartmouth		–		10	–	1	–	0
Massachusetts		–		9	–	1	–	0
Princeton		–		9	–	1	–	1
Syracuse		–		7	–	1	–	0
Geneva		–		7	–	1	–	1
Holy Cross		–		7	–	1	–	1
Army		–		5	–	1	–	2
Western U. of Penn		–		7	–	2	–	1
Lafayette		–		9	–	3	–	0
Swarthmore		–		8	–	2	–	2
Washington & Jefferson		–		6	–	2	–	2
Franklin & Marshall		–		7	–	3	–	1
Penn		–		10	–	5	–	0
Buffalo		–		4	–	2	–	0
Columbia		–		8	–	5	–	0
Fordham		–		2	–	1	–	1
Penn State		–		5	–	3	–	0
Bucknell		–		6	–	4	–	0
Temple		–		3	–	2	–	0
NYU		–		4	–	3	–	1
Pittsburgh College		–		3	–	3	–	0
Tufts		–		6	–	6	–	1
Vermont		–		5	–	5	–	1
Carlisle		–		5	–	7	–	1
Dickinson		–		4	–	6	–	0
Brown		–		4	–	7	–	1
Villanova		–		2	–	3	–	0
Drexel		–		2	–	5	–	1
Colgate		–		2	–	5	–	0
Boston College		–		1	–	8	–	0
Lehigh		–		1	–	11	–	0
New Hampshire		–		0	–	6	–	0
Rutgers		–		0	–	7	–	0

The 1901 Washington & Jefferson Red and Black football team was an American football team that represented Washington & Jefferson College as an independent during the 1901 college football season. Led by N. S. Knight in his first and only year as head coach, the team compiled a 6–2–2 record and outscored opponents by a total of 125 to 39.

== Schedule ==
Date	Opponent	Site	Result	Attendance	Source
October 5	Indiana Normal (PA)	College Park; Washington, PA	W 20–0	600	
October 12	Marietta	College Park; Washington, PA	W 17–5		
October 19	Western Reserve	College Park; Washington, PA	W 16–0		
October 26	Case	College Park; Washington, PA	W 28–0		
November 2	at Ohio Medical	Columbus, OH	T 0–0		
November 9	vs. Bucknell	Exposition Park; Allegheny City, PA	W 11–5		
November 13	West Virginia	College Park; Washington, PA	W 22–0		
November 16	at Navy	Worden Field; Annapolis, MD	L 11–17		
November 23	vs. Carlisle	Exposition Park; Allegheny City, PA	T 0–0	1,500	
November 28	at Homestead Library & Athletic Club	Exposition Park; Allegheny City, PA	L 0–12	4,200	
