= 1901 Army Cadets football team =

American college football season

1901 Army Cadets football
- Conference: Independent
- Record: 5–1–2
- Head coach: Leon Kromer (1st season)
- Captain: Adam Casad
- Home stadium: The Plain

1901 Eastern college football independents records
	Conf.			Overall
Team	W	L	T	W		L		T
Harvard		–		12	–	0	–	0
Yale		–		11	–	1	–	1
Cornell		–		11	–	1	–	0
Dartmouth		–		10	–	1	–	0
Massachusetts		–		9	–	1	–	0
Princeton		–		9	–	1	–	1
Syracuse		–		7	–	1	–	0
Geneva		–		7	–	1	–	1
Holy Cross		–		7	–	1	–	1
Army		–		5	–	1	–	2
Western U. of Penn		–		7	–	2	–	1
Lafayette		–		9	–	3	–	0
Swarthmore		–		8	–	2	–	2
Washington & Jefferson		–		6	–	2	–	2
Franklin & Marshall		–		7	–	3	–	1
Penn		–		10	–	5	–	0
Buffalo		–		4	–	2	–	0
Columbia		–		8	–	5	–	0
Fordham		–		2	–	1	–	1
Penn State		–		5	–	3	–	0
Bucknell		–		6	–	4	–	0
Temple		–		3	–	2	–	0
NYU		–		4	–	3	–	1
Pittsburgh College		–		3	–	3	–	0
Tufts		–		6	–	6	–	1
Vermont		–		5	–	5	–	1
Carlisle		–		5	–	7	–	1
Dickinson		–		4	–	6	–	0
Brown		–		4	–	7	–	1
Villanova		–		2	–	3	–	0
Drexel		–		2	–	5	–	1
Colgate		–		2	–	5	–	0
Boston College		–		1	–	8	–	0
Lehigh		–		1	–	11	–	0
New Hampshire		–		0	–	6	–	0
Rutgers		–		0	–	7	–	0

The 1901 Army Cadets football team represented the United States Military Academy as an independent during the 1901 college football season. In their first and only season under head coach Leon Kromer, the Cadets compiled a 5–1–2 record, shut out four opponents, and outscored all opponents by a combined total of 98 to 22. The team's only loss was by a 6 to 0 score against an undefeated Harvard team that has been recognized as a co-national champion for the 1901 season. The Cadets also tied with Yale (5–5) and Princeton (6–6). In the annual Army–Navy Game, the Cadets defeated the Midshipmen by an 11 to 5 score.

Two members of the 1901 Army team have been inducted into the College Football Hall of Fame: quarterback Charles Dudley Daly and tackle Paul Bunker. Both are also recognized by the NCAA as consensus first-team players on the 1901 College Football All-America Team. Daly received first-team honors from Walter Camp, Caspar Whitney, the New York Post and The Philadelphia Inquirer. Bunker received first-team honors from Camp and the New York Post and second-team honors from Whitney.

President Theodore Roosevelt attended the Army–Navy Game in Philadelphia on December 1. A newspaper account noted: "For the first time in the history of foot-ball a President of the United States added dignity to a noted contest by his presence."

== Schedule ==
Date	Opponent	Site	Result	Attendance	Source
October 5	Franklin & Marshall	Highland Falls, NY	W 20–0	2,000-3,000	
October 12	Trinity (CT)	The Plain; West Point, NY	W 17–0		
October 19	Harvard	The Plain; West Point, NY	L 0–6		
October 26	Williams	The Plain; West Point, NY	W 15–0		
November 2	Yale	The Plain; West Point, NY	T 5–5		
November 9	Princeton	The Plain; West Point, NY	T 6–6		
November 23	Penn	The Plain; West Point, NY	W 24–0		
November 30	vs. Navy	Franklin Field; Philadelphia, PA (Army–Navy Game)	W 11–5	28,000	
