= 1901 Lafayette football team =

American college football season

1901 Lafayette football
- Conference: Independent
- Record: 9–3
- Head coach: Samuel B. Newton (3rd season)
- Captain: Walter E. Bachman
- Home stadium: March Field

1901 Eastern college football independents records
| | Conf. | | | Overall |
| Team | W | L | T | W | | L | | T |
|---|---|---|---|---|---|---|---|---|
| Harvard | | – | | 12 | – | 0 | – | 0 |
| Yale | | – | | 11 | – | 1 | – | 1 |
| Cornell | | – | | 11 | – | 1 | – | 0 |
| Dartmouth | | – | | 10 | – | 1 | – | 0 |
| Massachusetts | | – | | 9 | – | 1 | – | 0 |
| Princeton | | – | | 9 | – | 1 | – | 1 |
| Syracuse | | – | | 7 | – | 1 | – | 0 |
| Geneva | | – | | 7 | – | 1 | – | 1 |
| Holy Cross | | – | | 7 | – | 1 | – | 1 |
| Army | | – | | 5 | – | 1 | – | 2 |
| Western U. of Penn | | – | | 7 | – | 2 | – | 1 |
| Lafayette | | – | | 9 | – | 3 | – | 0 |
| Swarthmore | | – | | 8 | – | 2 | – | 2 |
| Washington & Jefferson | | – | | 6 | – | 2 | – | 2 |
| Franklin & Marshall | | – | | 7 | – | 3 | – | 1 |
| Penn | | – | | 10 | – | 5 | – | 0 |
| Buffalo | | – | | 4 | – | 2 | – | 0 |
| Columbia | | – | | 8 | – | 5 | – | 0 |
| Fordham | | – | | 2 | – | 1 | – | 1 |
| Penn State | | – | | 5 | – | 3 | – | 0 |
| Bucknell | | – | | 6 | – | 4 | – | 0 |
| Temple | | – | | 3 | – | 2 | – | 0 |
| NYU | | – | | 4 | – | 3 | – | 1 |
| Pittsburgh College | | – | | 3 | – | 3 | – | 0 |
| Tufts | | – | | 6 | – | 6 | – | 1 |
| Vermont | | – | | 5 | – | 5 | – | 1 |
| Carlisle | | – | | 5 | – | 7 | – | 1 |
| Dickinson | | – | | 4 | – | 6 | – | 0 |
| Brown | | – | | 4 | – | 7 | – | 1 |
| Villanova | | – | | 2 | – | 3 | – | 0 |
| Drexel | | – | | 2 | – | 5 | – | 1 |
| Colgate | | – | | 2 | – | 5 | – | 0 |
| Boston College | | – | | 1 | – | 8 | – | 0 |
| Lehigh | | – | | 1 | – | 11 | – | 0 |
| New Hampshire | | – | | 0 | – | 6 | – | 0 |
| Rutgers | | – | | 0 | – | 7 | – | 0 |

The 1901 Lafayette football team was an American football team that represented Lafayette College in the 1901 college football season. In its third season under head coach Samuel B. Newton, the team compiled a 9–3 record and outscored opponents by a total of 240 to 94.

Two of the team's three losses were suffered in games against early professional football teams (Homestead Library & Athletic Club and Philadelphia Athletic Club) made up of all-star rosters.

== Schedule ==
| Date | Opponent | Site | Result | Attendance | Source |
|---|---|---|---|---|---|
| October 2 | Ursinus | March Field; Easton, PA | W 40–0 | | |
| October 5 | Susquehanna | March Field; Easton, PA | W 42–5 | | |
| October 12 | at Syracuse | Syracuse, NY | W 5–0 | 2,500 | |
| October 16 | Manhattan | March Field; Easton, PA | W 16–6 | | |
| October 19 | at Orange Athletic Club | East Orange, NJ | W 17–0 | | |
| October 26 | at Princeton | University Field; Princeton, NJ | L 0–6 | 3,000 | |
| November 2 | Lehigh | March Field; Easton, PA (rivalry) | W 29–0 | 3,000 | |
| November 5 | at Philadelphia Athletic Club | National League Park; Philadelphia, PA | L 0–23 | | |
| November 9 | at Brown | Andrews Field; Providence, RI | W 11–6 | | |
| November 16 | at Homestead Library & Athletic Club | Exposition Park; Pittsburgh, PA | L 0–48 | | |
| November 23 | at Lehigh | Bethlehem, PA (rivalry) | W 41–0 | 2,000 | |
| November 28 | Dickinson | March Field; Easton, PA | W 29–0 | 3,000 | |
