= 1901 Western University of Pennsylvania football team =

American college football season

1901 Western University of Pennsylvania football
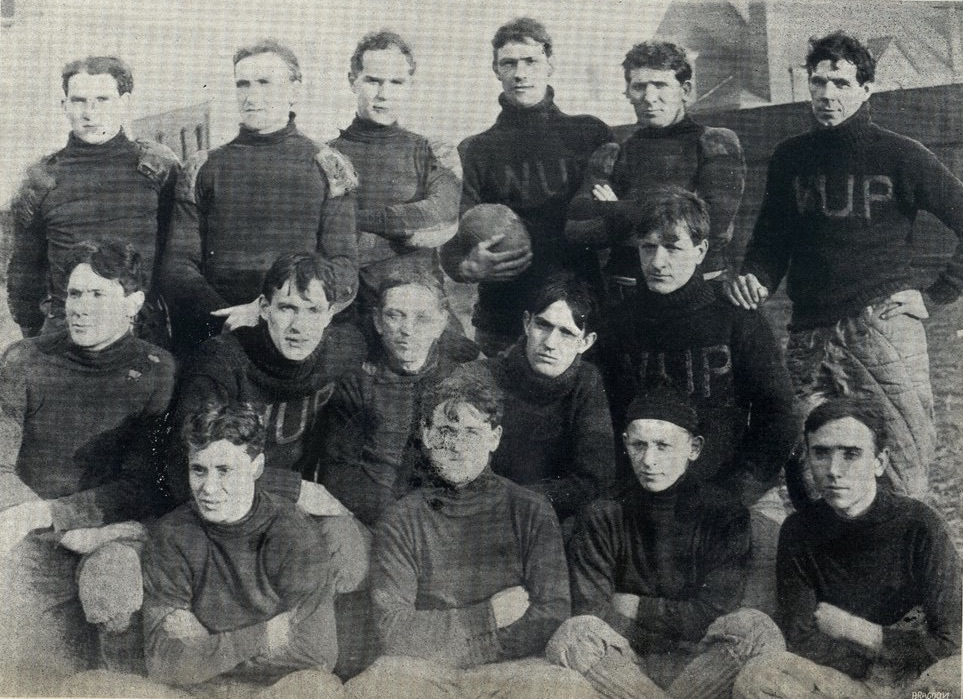
- Conference: Independent
- Record: 7–2–1
- Head coach: Wilbur Hockensmith (1st season)
- Home stadium: Schenley Park

1901 Eastern college football independents records
	Conf.			Overall
Team	W	L	T	W		L		T
Harvard		–		12	–	0	–	0
Yale		–		11	–	1	–	1
Cornell		–		11	–	1	–	0
Dartmouth		–		10	–	1	–	0
Massachusetts		–		9	–	1	–	0
Princeton		–		9	–	1	–	1
Syracuse		–		7	–	1	–	0
Geneva		–		7	–	1	–	1
Holy Cross		–		7	–	1	–	1
Army		–		5	–	1	–	2
Western U. of Penn		–		7	–	2	–	1
Lafayette		–		9	–	3	–	0
Swarthmore		–		8	–	2	–	2
Washington & Jefferson		–		6	–	2	–	2
Franklin & Marshall		–		7	–	3	–	1
Penn		–		10	–	5	–	0
Buffalo		–		4	–	2	–	0
Columbia		–		8	–	5	–	0
Fordham		–		2	–	1	–	1
Penn State		–		5	–	3	–	0
Bucknell		–		6	–	4	–	0
Temple		–		3	–	2	–	0
NYU		–		4	–	3	–	1
Pittsburgh College		–		3	–	3	–	0
Tufts		–		6	–	6	–	1
Vermont		–		5	–	5	–	1
Carlisle		–		5	–	7	–	1
Dickinson		–		4	–	6	–	0
Brown		–		4	–	7	–	1
Villanova		–		2	–	3	–	0
Drexel		–		2	–	5	–	1
Colgate		–		2	–	5	–	0
Boston College		–		1	–	8	–	0
Lehigh		–		1	–	11	–	0
New Hampshire		–		0	–	6	–	0
Rutgers		–		0	–	7	–	0

The 1901 Western University of Pennsylvania football team was an American football team that represented Western University of Pennsylvania (now known as the University of Pittsburgh) as an independent during the 1901 college football season.

== Schedule ==
Date	Opponent	Site	Result	Attendance	Source
September 28	at Penn State	Bellefonte, PA (rivalry)	L 0–37		
October 5	at West Virginia	Morgantown, WV (rivalry)	W 12–0		
October 12	Indiana Normal (PA)	Schenley Park; Pittsburgh, PA	T 0–0	5,000	
October 19	Allegheny	Schenley Park; Pittsburgh, PA	W 11–0	3,000	
October 26	Pittsburgh College	Schenley Park; Pittsburgh, PA	W 18–0	3,000	
November 2	California State Normal (PA)	Schenley Park; Pittsburgh, PA	W 15–0	2,500	
November 9	at Geneva	Beaver Falls, PA	W 12–5	2000	
November 16	Thiel	Schenley Park; Pittsburgh, PA	W 17–0	500	
November 20	Westminster (PA)	Recreation Park; Allegheny, PA	W 11–0	2500	
November 23	at Allegheny	Meadville, PA	L 0–15		

== Season recap ==
Since there was a lack of funds to entice an outside coach for the 1901 football season, the Western University Athletic Association convinced Wilbur D. Hockensmith to organize the team. Mr. Hockensmith had just graduated from the Western University of Pa. with a degree in mechanical engineering and had played guard on the 1900 football team. "Coach" Hockensmith and team captain Malcolm McConnell managed to recruit enough players and were granted the use of Schenley Oval for their home field of play. They also arranged, through the Pittsburgh Railways Company, a deal so that all fans could attend the games free of charge. Chancellor William J. Holland's master vision was to bring the University to the East End and introducing the residents and students to amateur football on the Schenley Oval was a step in the right direction. The WUP administration also demanded that their opponents sign an agreement that all athletes were in good academic standing at the school. After two games, the Athletic Committee appointed Winthrop S. Worcester to assistant football manager so Richard Wallace could spend more time as an assistant coach. They also resolved that all teams representing the WUP must be amateur and they could not play against a professional team. In its first season under head coach Wilbur Hockensmith, the team compiled a 7–2–1 record and outscored opponents by a total of 96 to 53.

== Game summaries ==
=== At Penn State ===
WUP at Penn State

Team	1	2	Total
WUP	0	0	0
• Penn State	16	21	37

- Date: September 28, 1901
- Location: Colosseum (Recreation Park), Pittsburgh, PA
- Referee: Dr. Robinson (State College)

The first game of the 1901 season was September 28 at Bellefonte, Pa. against the strong eleven of State College. The problem for Coach Hockensmith and team captain McConnell was that the Medical School did not start until October 1. Tryouts were held and a practice game was played against the No. 13 team. This was a team of deaf mutes and they played hard against the University boys for an hour. Coach and captain chose a lineup and they felt prepared for the fourth chapter in the Penn State rivalry. However, State coach William Golden's eleven were too much of a challenge for the undermanned WUP. The Staties had played the week before and were even much better after another week of practice. Henry Scholl and Ed Whitworth each scored three touchdowns. Robert Bennett added another touchdown and Sam Russell connected on two goal kicks to make the final score 37–0. The WUP lineup for the game against Penn State was Richard Wallace (left end), James Chessrown (left tackle), Andrew Wallgren (left guard), Stacy Hankey (center), Hill (right guard), William Secrist (right tackle), Logan (right end), Hugh Morrow (quarterback), John Martin (left halfback), Reed (right halfback) and Malcolm McConnell (fullback). Parke Bachman replaced Stacy Hankey at center. The game was played in 30-minute halves.

=== At West Virginia ===
WUP at West Virginia

Team	1	2	Total
• WUP	0	12	12
West Virginia	0	0	0

- Date: October 5, 1901
- Location: West Virginia Grounds, Morgantown, WV
- Referee: Cubbisson

The opening of the Medical School allowed Coach Hockensmith to rearrange the WUP lineup for the October 5 encounter with West Virginia in Morgantown, West Virginia. John Simpson, a graduate student from Franklin & Marshall College, started at halfback along with Reed. William Secrist, a graduate student from Allegheny College, started at fullback so captain Malcolm McConnell could return to his normal guard position. Wheeler was positioned at the opposite guard position. John Martin and Paul McClain were inserted at end, and Joe McCready was the quarterback. Richard Wallace and Andrew Wallgren were named the tackles and Parke Bachman was the starting center. West Virginia was having lineup problems of their own. Their quarterback Wiant and fullback Smith were disqualified for grades and starting end Cole and halfback Brown were injured and did not play. The situation caused their Coach Yeager to try to get himself into the lineup but the WUP officials denied the request. After nine straight defeats to West Virginia this newly configured lineup was able to notch the Western U.'s first victory in the Backyard Brawl. The WUP offense had the ball within scoring distance twice in the first half but were unable to capitalize. Once they lost the ball on a fumble and the second time the whistle blew for halftime. West Virginia lost the ball on downs to start the second half and the WUP offense steadily moved the ball. Both John Simpson and John Martin made huge gains and fullback William Secrist plunged into the end zone for the first score. Five minutes later Secrist scored his second touchdown. McConnell was good on both goals after. The WUP offense was on the West Virginia fifteen yard line as time expired with the Western University ahead 12–0. The WUP team suffered no major injuries and they were impressed with the deportment of the West Virginia fans. The game was played in 20-minute halves.

=== Indiana Normal ===
Indiana Normal at WUP

Team	1	2	Total
Indiana Normal	0	0	0
WUP	0	0	0

- Date: October 12, 1901
- Location: Schenley Park, Pittsburgh, PA
- Referee: E.W. Paul (WUP)

On Saturday, October 12 somewhere between three thousand (Pittsburgh Daily Post) and five thousand (Pittsburgh Press) frenzied fans and students gathered at Schenley Park to witness the free WUP versus Indiana Normal football game. The teams entertained the crowd with a fierce defensive battle. Several times play was stopped for injuries. The heavier Normals were able to keep the speedier Western U. from scoring. The WUP defense was also able to keep the Normal offense in check so the game ended in a scoreless tie. The WUP contingent was disappointed and concerned about injuries to ends Paul McClain and John Martin. The WUP lineup for the game against Indiana Normal was Paul McClain (left end), Richard Wallace (left tackle), Wheeler (left guard), Thomas Crea (center), Malcolm McConnell (right guard), Andrew Wallgren (right tackle), John Martin (right end), Joe McCready (quarterback), John Simpson (left halfback), Reed (right halfback) and William Secrist (fullback). The substitutes used in this game were: Logan, Hugh Morrow, Marion Edmundson and James Chessrown. This game consisted of one twenty minute half and one fifteen minute half.

=== Allegheny ===
Allegheny at WUP

Team	1	2	Total
Allegheny	0	0	0
• WUP	0	11	11

- Date: October 19, 1901
- Location: Schenley Park, Pittsburgh, PA
- Game attendance: 3,000+
- Referee: Hockensmith

After a hard week of practice the WUP football team was prepared to take on the Methodists of Allegheny College from Meadville, Pa. at Schenley Park in the second game of the free series. There were only minor lineup changes for this game by the WUP. Hugh Morrow replaced John Martin at end and Parke Bachman was the starting center. The game started with WUP kicking to Allegheny halfback Taylor, who fumbled the ball into the end zone. He fell on it and a WUP player downed him for a safety. The referee E.W. Paul claimed it was a touchback. The WUPs protested to no avail and the game continued. The WUP offense moved the ball but Reed and Wallgren each fumbled when in scoring range to thwart the drives. The first half ended in a scoreless tie. The WUP offense received the second half kickoff and advanced the ball downfield. Reed and Simpson did most of the ball carrying with Simpson scoring the touchdown. McConnell kicked the goal after. The Western U. received the ensuing kickoff and moved the ball methodically ninety yards with Reed going in for the score from the five yard line. The goal kick after was unsuccessful. The game ended a short time later with the WUP ahead 11–0. Since the Alleghenies had lost their two previous games by the same 11-0 score, they insisted that the umpire should reverse his touchback call and give the Westerns two more points so the score would not be 11–0. The starting WUP lineup for the game against Allegheny College was Hugh Morrow (left end), Richard Wallace (left tackle), Wheeler (left guard), Parke Bachman (center), Malcolm McConnell (right guard), Andrew Wallgren (right tackle), Paul McClain (right end), Joe McCready (quarterback), John Simpson (left halfback), Reed (right halfback) and William Secrist (fullback). Kerr replaced Hugh Morrow at left end and Pete Edwards replaced John Simpson at left halfback. The game was played in 20-minute halves.

=== Pittsburg College ===
Pittsburg College at WUP

Team	1	2	Total
Pittsburg College	0	0	0
• WUP	6	12	18

- Date: October 19, 1901
- Location: Schenley Park, Pittsburgh, PA
- Game attendance: 3,000
- Referee: L. Groves (Geneva)

Prior to the October 26 meeting with Pittsburg College it was a nerve-wracking week for captain McConnell. Starting halfback Reed toyed with the idea of transferring to Washington & Jefferson College and halfback Simpson needed to be replaced due to his medical studies. Pete Edwards replaced Simpson in the lineup and Reed decided to stay at the WUP. With the lineup finally set, the WUP eleven was ready to entertain another large home crowd at Schenley Oval. Each team fumbled on their opening possession. The WUP offense moved the ball to the Pittsburg ten yard line on their next drive but turned the ball over on downs. The College eleven made two first downs and then fumbled into the hands of WUP quarterback McCready. He had a convoy of blockers in front of him and scored easily. McConnell kicked the goal after. Pittsburg kicked off and the WUP offense advanced the ball into Pittsburg territory but McConnell was called for a penalty and the ball went back to the College eleven. The WUP defense held and the score was 6–0 at halftime. The WUP offense was able to score touchdowns on their first two possessions of the second half. Their offense easily penetrated the College defense and fullback Secrist was lifted into the end zone for the scores. McConnell was successful on both goal kicks and the game ended with the score 18–0 in favor of the Western University. The WUP starting lineup for the game against Pittsburg College was Hugh Morrow (left end), Richard Wallace (left tackle), Wheeler (left guard), Parke Bachman (center), Malcolm McConnell (right guard), Andrew Wallgren (right tackle), Paul McClain (right end), Joe McCready (quarterback), Pete Edwards (left halfback), Reed (right halfback) and William Secrist (fullback). Cummings replaced Edwards at left halfback. The game was played in 20-minute halves.

=== California State Normal (PA) ===
California Normal at WUP

Team	1	2	Total
California Normal	0	0	0
• WUP	10	5	15

- Date: November 2, 1901
- Location: Schenley Park, Pittsburgh, PA
- Referee: E.W. Paul

Captain Wallace had to tweak the WUP lineup again for the game with California Normal. Morrow, Reed and McCready needed to be replaced. Adams played end for Morrow, Simpson was back at halfback for Reed and Martin stepped in for quarterback McCready. The game started with both teams alternating possession due to fumbles. Late in the first half Western U. halfback Cummings raced fifteen yards for the first score. McConnell missed the goal after and the score was 5–0. After the ensuing kick off the WUP offense advanced the ball down the field and scored on a run by McClain. The goal kick after was again unsuccessful and the score was 10–0 at halftime. The second half began as the first with both teams playing good defense and causing fumbles. Late in the half the WUP offense managed to drive the ball within one yard of the goal but fumbled. Their defense held and got the ball back after a punt. The WUP offense kept driving through the Normal defense and McConnell scored the third touchdown of the game. The final score was 15–0 in favor of the Westerns. The WUP lineup for the game against California Normal was John Simpson (left end), Richard Wallace (left tackle), Wheeler (left guard), Parke Bachman (center), William Secrist (right guard), Andrew Wallgren (right tackle), Paul McClain (right end), John Martin (quarterback), Paul McClain (left halfback), Cummings (right halfback) and Malcolm McConnell (fullback). Substitutions during the game included: Marion Edmundson replaced John Simpson at left end; Simpson replaced Cummings at right halfback; Cummings replaced Malcolm McConnell at fullback; and McConnell replaced William Secrist at right guard. This game consisted of one twenty-five minute half and one twenty minute half.

=== At Geneva ===
WUP at Geneva

Team	1	2	Total
• WUP	0	12	12
Geneva	0	5	5

- Date: November 9, 1901
- Location: Geneva Grounds, Beaver Falls, PA
- Game attendance: 2,000
- Referee: Fry (P.A.C.)

On November 9 the WUP eleven embarked on their second road game of the season to Beaver Falls, Pa. to play the unbeaten Geneva Covenanters. With Joe McCready back at quarterback and John Martin at end, coach McConnell was confident the WUP team could compete. This Geneva team had five players (Joseph H. Thompson, Joseph Edgar, Arthur McKean, Walter East and Albert T. Schmidt) who would later continue their studies at the WUP and compete on the WUP football team. In fact, Joe Thompson would coach the Pitt Panthers from 1909-1912. In the first half the WUP offense came close to scoring twice only to be stopped by fumbles. The Geneva offense moved the ball well but the WUP defense would not allow any scoring. On Geneva's first possession of the second half their offense marched the ball down the field and Joe Thompson scored on a plunge through the middle. The kick after failed and Geneva led 5–0. The WUP offense then took over the game. They ran the ball through and around the Geneva defense and Simpson finally scored on a double pass from the fifteen yard line. Reed was successful with the goal kick after and the Western U. led 6–5. After a quick change of possessions the WUP offense again functioned smoothly. Simpson's thirty-five yard gain was followed by Martin's twenty yard scamper around the end. Reed followed with a fifteen yard jaunt and McClain raced around the end on a delayed pass for the second WUP touchdown. McConnell kicked the goal after and the final score was 12–5 in favor of the WUP. The WUP lineup for the game against Geneva was John Martin (left end), Richard Wallace (left tackle), Cummings (left guard), Parke Bachman (center), Malcolm McConnell (right guard), Andrew Wallgren (right tackle), Paul McClain (right end), Joe McCready (quarterback), John Simpson (left halfback), Reed (right halfback) and William Secrist (fullback). The game was played in 30-minute halves.

=== Thiel ===
Thiel at WUP

Team	1	2	Total
Thiel	0	0	0
• WUP	6	11	17

- Date: November 16, 1901
- Location: Schenley Park, Pittsburgh, PA
- Game attendance: 500
- Referee: E.W. Paul

On November 16, the Thiel College eleven from Greenville, Pennsylvania arrived at Schenley Park for the final free game of the season. Unfortunately, strong wind and snow flurries insured the smallest crowd of the five game series. Thiel wanted to play their coach in the starting lineup and the WUP contested his participation. He was replaced and the game commenced. The WUP lineup had Hankey at center for Bachman and Martin replaced Reed at halfback. WUP received the opening kick off and promptly fumbled. The Thiel offense ran thirteen plays and reached the WUP eight yard line. The WUP defense was able to thwart the drive and take over on downs at their five. After a change of possessions the WUP offense was sparked by Simpson's thirty five yard sprint. McClain ran the final fifteen yards for the touchdown and McConnell was successful on the goal kick after. The first half ended with the score 6–0 in favor of the Westerns. The Thiel offense was stymied by the WUP defense in the second half. The WUP offense worked well and early in the second half Secrist plunged into the end zone for the second touchdown. Captain McConnell made some substitutions – Kerr replaced Cummings at guard and Cummings replaced Simpson at halfback. Cummings proceeded to gain fifty-five yards in two carries and Secrist again plunged into the end zone for the third and final WUP touchdown. McConnell was good on the goal kick after and the final score read WUP 17 - Thiel 0. The five game series ended successfully as more than 10,000 fans were able to attend and the WUP eleven were undefeated and unscored upon. Manager Wallace made a notable comment to the Pittsburg Post:

"The Schenley Park games have done wonders in establishing an interest in amateur athletics, and the fight against professional teams will be continued next year. There will be no letup until professional football has been driven from Pittsburg. Caspar Whitney in an article written three years ago said 'Western Pennsylvania is the center of professional athletics in the United States and no Eastern college which values its amateur standing should play any college team from that section of the country.' Since that time all the colleges of any importance have been established on a strictly amateur basis with one exception."

The WUP lineup for the game against Thiel was John Martin (left end), Richard Wallace (left tackle), Cummings (left guard), Parke Bachman (center), Malcolm McConnell (right guard), Andrew Wallgren (right tackle), Paul McClain (right end), Joe McCready (quarterback), John Simpson (left halfback), Reed (right halfback) and William Secrist (fullback). The game was played in 25-minute halves.

=== Westminster (PA) ===
Westminster at WUP

Team	1	2	Total
Westminster	0	0	0
• WUP	6	5	11

- Date: November 20, 1901
- Location: Recreation Park, Pittsburgh, PA
- Game attendance: 2,500
- Referee: Mr. Snitzer (Yale)

On Wednesday, November 20, with three days rest the WUP eleven took on the Westminster Titans team at Recreation Park. This game was considered the big game on the schedule and school was closed for the occasion. Parades took place in each town and students and faculty were noisily in attendance. The WUP offense was able to drive the ball on their first possession and McConnell took the ball over from the six yard line for the touchdown. He was successful on the goal kick after. Westminster retaliated with a sustained drive of their own and were on the WUP eight as time ran out in the half with WUP ahead 6–0. The WUP offense controlled the ball at the beginning of the second half. They methodically advanced down the field with Secrist plunging into the end zone for the second touchdown. The goal kick after was unsuccessful. The WUP offense was close to scoring on two other possessions but the Westminster defense held them out of the end zone and the final score was 11–0. The WUP lineup for the game against Westminster was John Martin (left end), Richard Wallace (left tackle), Cummings (left guard), Parke Bachman (center), Malcolm McConnell (right guard), Andrew Wallgren (right tackle), Paul McClain (right end), Joe McCready (quarterback), John Simpson (left halfback), Reed (right halfback) and William Secrist (fullback). The substitutions during the game were: Kerr replaced Cummings at left guard and Cummings replaced Simpson at left halfback. The game was played in 25-minute halves.

=== At Allegheny ===
WUP at Allegheny

Team	1	2	Total
WUP	0	0	0
• Allegheny	10	5	15

- Date: November 23, 1901
- Location: Allegheny Grounds, Meadville, PA
- Referee: E.W. Paul

Friday afternoon, November 22, the WUP eleven traveled to Meadville, Pa. for a game with the Allegheny College eleven on Saturday. This was the third game of the week for the WUP team. Quarterback Joe McCready and center Parke Bachman were injured and did not play. Hugh Morrow stepped in at quarterback and Stacy Hankey started at center. The field was muddy and a steady drizzle fell during the game. After alternating possessions the Allegheny offense ran through the porous WUP defense and McCarthy plowed into the end zone from the one foot line. The goal kick after was unsuccessful. On the ensuing kickoff the whistle had not blown and WUP had to rekick. The second attempt went out of bounds, so the ball was brought back and a third attempt was made. This time Leffingwell caught the ball on the ten yard line and raced 100 yards for another Allegheny touchdown. The goal after was again unsuccessful and the WUP was trailing 10–0. The Alleghenies moved the ball again but the WUP defense stiffened and got the ball back for the offense. The WUP offense was able to gain some first downs and were on the Allegheny five yard line when time expired in the first half. After the intermission Allegheny continued to advance the ball against the WUP defense and Williams scored their third touchdown. The WUP offense gained small chunks of yardage and as time ran down they attempted a field goal that was unsuccessful. The Alleghenies won the game 15–0. The WUP lineup for the game against Allegheny was John Martin (left end), Richard Wallace (left tackle), Cummings (left guard), Stacy Hankey (center), Wheeler (right guard), Andrew Wallgren (right tackle), Paul McClain (right end), Hugh Morrow (quarterback), John Simpson (left halfback), Reed (right halfback) and William Secrist (fullback). Substitutions during the game were: Malcolm McConnell replaced William Secrist at fullback; and John McClymonds replaced Wheeler at right guard. The game was played in 20-minute halves.

== Scoring summary ==
1901 Western University of Pennsylvania scoring summary
Player	Touchdowns	Extra points	Safety	Points
William Secrist	7	0	?	35
Malcolm McConnell	2	10	?	20
Paul McClain	3	0	?	15
John Simpson	2	0	?	10
Reed	1	1	?	6
Cummings	1	0	?	5
Joseph McCready	1	0	?	5
Totals	17	11	?	96

== Roster ==
The roster of the 1901 Western University of Pennsylvania football team:

Lettermen:

- Dr. John L. Martin (end) graduated with a Doctor of Medicine degree in 1903 and resided in Pittsburgh.
- Dr. John R. Simpson (halfback) originally graduated from and played ball at Franklin & Marshall College. He attended the WUP medical school for a few years and finished his studies at the Jefferson Medical College in Philadelphia, Pa. He resided in Pittsburgh.
- Dr. Paul J. McClain (end) earned a Doctor of Medicine degree in 1903 and resided in Oil City, Pa.
- Dr. Andrew B. Wallgren (tackle) earned a Doctor of Medicine degree in 1902. He was a member of the University faculty and lived in Wilkinsburg, Pa.
- William B. Secrist (fullback) was a graduate of Allegheny College prior to attending the WUP law school. He earned his law degree in 1905 and resided in Pittsburgh.
- Joseph McCready (quarterback) attended Medical School but did not graduate. He resided in Meadville, Pa.
- Hugh B. Morrow (end) received his Associate College degree in 1904 and resided in New York, N.Y.
- Walter Shidler (substitute) earned his Doctor of Medicine degree in 1903 and resided in Houston, Pa.
- Adams (substitute)
- A. Erwin Cummings (halfback) graduated from Law School in 1905 and resided in Washington County.

Remaining squad:

- Thomas Crea (center) earned his degree in Civil Engineering in 1905 and resided in Harmarville, Pa.
- Dr. Stacy M. Hankey (center) received his Doctor of Medicine degree in 1903 and resided in Pittsburgh.
- Marion Edmundson (end) earned his associate law degree in 1906 and resided in McKeesport, Pa.
- John McClymonds (guard) earned his Doctor of Dental Surgery in 1903 and resided in Butler, Pa.
- Reed (halfback)
- Wheeler (guard)
- John Edwards (halfback) earned his Bachelor of Science degree in 1904 and resided in Cincinnati, Ohio
- Dr. John Kerr (substitute) earned his Doctor of Medicine degree in 1903.
- Logan (end)
- Hill (guard)

== Coaching staff ==
Wilbur Hockensmith (coach) 1901 graduate with a Mechanical Engineering degree played four seasons of football for WUP. He was affiliated with the Hockensmith Mine and Car Wheel Company and resided in the Pittsburgh area.

- Malcolm F. McConnell (captain/tackle) earned his Mechanical Engineering degree in 1902. He worked for the Carnegie Steel Company. (Letter winner)
- Richard Wallace (manager/tackle) earned his degree in Electrical Engineering in 1902 and resided in Millvale, Pa. (Letter winner)
- Winthrop S. Worcester (assistant manager) earned his Electrical Engineering degree in 1903 and resided in Hallowell, Maine
