= 1901 Lehigh Brown and White football team =

American college football season

1901 Lehigh Brown and White football
- Conference: Independent
- Record: 1–11
- Head coach: J. W. H. Pollard (1st season)

1901 Eastern college football independents records
	Conf.			Overall
Team	W	L	T	W		L		T
Harvard		–		12	–	0	–	0
Yale		–		11	–	1	–	1
Cornell		–		11	–	1	–	0
Dartmouth		–		10	–	1	–	0
Massachusetts		–		9	–	1	–	0
Princeton		–		9	–	1	–	1
Syracuse		–		7	–	1	–	0
Geneva		–		7	–	1	–	1
Holy Cross		–		7	–	1	–	1
Army		–		5	–	1	–	2
Western U. of Penn		–		7	–	2	–	1
Lafayette		–		9	–	3	–	0
Swarthmore		–		8	–	2	–	2
Washington & Jefferson		–		6	–	2	–	2
Franklin & Marshall		–		7	–	3	–	1
Penn		–		10	–	5	–	0
Buffalo		–		4	–	2	–	0
Columbia		–		8	–	5	–	0
Fordham		–		2	–	1	–	1
Penn State		–		5	–	3	–	0
Bucknell		–		6	–	4	–	0
Temple		–		3	–	2	–	0
NYU		–		4	–	3	–	1
Pittsburgh College		–		3	–	3	–	0
Tufts		–		6	–	6	–	1
Vermont		–		5	–	5	–	1
Carlisle		–		5	–	7	–	1
Dickinson		–		4	–	6	–	0
Brown		–		4	–	7	–	1
Villanova		–		2	–	3	–	0
Drexel		–		2	–	5	–	1
Colgate		–		2	–	5	–	0
Boston College		–		1	–	8	–	0
Lehigh		–		1	–	11	–	0
New Hampshire		–		0	–	6	–	0
Rutgers		–		0	–	7	–	0

The 1901 Lehigh Brown and White football team was an American football team that represented Lehigh University as an independent during the 1901 college football season. In its first and only season under head coach J. W. H. Pollard, the team compiled a 1–11 record and was outscored by a total of 278 to 26.

== Schedule ==
Date	Time	Opponent	Site	Result	Attendance	Source
September 28		at Penn	Franklin Field; Philadelphia, PA	L 0–28		
October 5	3:10 p.m.	at Buffalo	Pan-American Exposition Stadium; Buffalo, NY	L 0–16	8,000	
October 12		at Princeton	University Field; Princeton, NJ	L 0–35		
October 16		Swarthmore	Bethlehem, PA	L 5–6		
October 19		at Navy	Worden Field; Annapolis, MD	L 0–18		
October 26		Bucknell	Bethlehem, PA	L 0–10		
November 2		at Lafayette	March Field; Easton, PA (rivalry)	L 0–29	3,000	
November 9		at Cornell	Percy Field; Ithaca, NY	L 0–30		
November 13		Haverford	Bethlehem, PA	W 21–5		
November 16		vs. Penn State	Williamsport, PA	L 0–38	1,500	
November 23		Lafayette	Bethlehem, PA (rivalry)	L 0–41	2,000	
November 28		Georgetown	Bethlehem, PA	L 0–22		
