= 1901 Penn Quakers football team =

American college football season

1901 Penn Quakers football
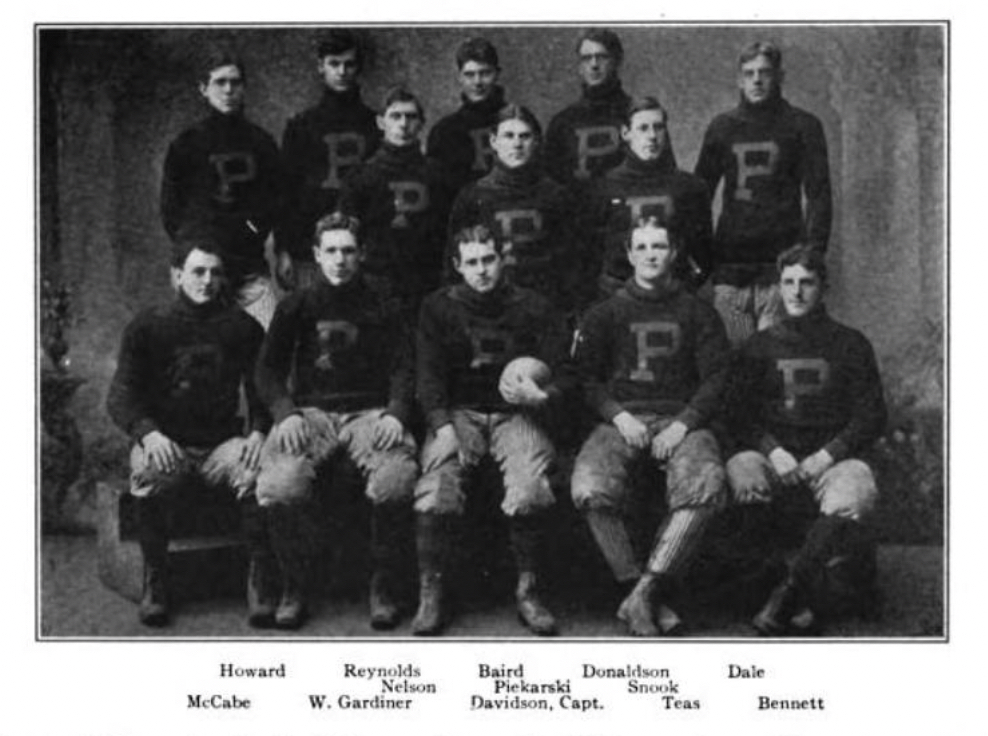
- Conference: Independent
- Record: 10–5
- Head coach: George Washington Woodruff (10th season)
- Captain: H. A. Davidson
- Home stadium: Franklin Field

1901 Eastern college football independents records
	Conf.			Overall
Team	W	L	T	W		L		T
Harvard		–		12	–	0	–	0
Yale		–		11	–	1	–	1
Cornell		–		11	–	1	–	0
Dartmouth		–		10	–	1	–	0
Massachusetts		–		9	–	1	–	0
Princeton		–		9	–	1	–	1
Syracuse		–		7	–	1	–	0
Geneva		–		7	–	1	–	1
Holy Cross		–		7	–	1	–	1
Army		–		5	–	1	–	2
Western U. of Penn		–		7	–	2	–	1
Lafayette		–		9	–	3	–	0
Swarthmore		–		8	–	2	–	2
Washington & Jefferson		–		6	–	2	–	2
Franklin & Marshall		–		7	–	3	–	1
Penn		–		10	–	5	–	0
Buffalo		–		4	–	2	–	0
Columbia		–		8	–	5	–	0
Fordham		–		2	–	1	–	1
Penn State		–		5	–	3	–	0
Bucknell		–		6	–	4	–	0
Temple		–		3	–	2	–	0
NYU		–		4	–	3	–	1
Pittsburgh College		–		3	–	3	–	0
Tufts		–		6	–	6	–	1
Vermont		–		5	–	5	–	1
Carlisle		–		5	–	7	–	1
Dickinson		–		4	–	6	–	0
Brown		–		4	–	7	–	1
Villanova		–		2	–	3	–	0
Drexel		–		2	–	5	–	1
Colgate		–		2	–	5	–	0
Boston College		–		1	–	8	–	0
Lehigh		–		1	–	11	–	0
New Hampshire		–		0	–	6	–	0
Rutgers		–		0	–	7	–	0

The 1901 Penn Quakers football team was an American football team that represented the University of Pennsylvania as an independent during the 1901 college football season. In its tenth season under head coach George Washington Woodruff, the team compiled a 10–5 record and outscored opponents by a total of 203 to 121. Significant games included victories over Penn State (23–6), Chicago (11–0), and Carlisle (16–14), and losses to Navy (6–5), Harvard (33–6), and Army (24–0).

Two Penn players received recognition on the 1901 College Football All-America Team: guard John Teas (Walter Camp, 3rd team); and halfback Marshall S. Reynolds (The Philadelphia Inquirer, 1st team).

== Schedule ==
Date	Opponent	Site	Result	Attendance	Source
September 28	Lehigh	Franklin Field; Philadelphia, PA	W 28–0		
October 2	Franklin & Marshall	Franklin Field; Philadelphia, PA	W 6–0	1,500	
October 5	Penn State	Franklin Field; Philadelphia, PA	W 23–6		
October 9	Swarthmore	Franklin Field; Philadelphia, PA	W 28–0		
October 12	Brown	Franklin Field; Philadelphia, PA	W 26–0	10,000	
October 16	Virginia	Franklin Field; Philadelphia, PA	W 20–5		
October 19	Bucknell	Franklin Field; Philadelphia, PA	W 6–0		
October 21	at Navy	Worden Field; Annapolis, MD	L 5–6		
October 23	Gettysburg	Franklin Field; Philadelphia, PA	W 22–0		
October 26	at Chicago	Marshall Field; Chicago, IL	W 11–0		
November 2	at Columbia	Polo Grounds; New York, NY	L 0–11		
November 9	Harvard	Franklin Field; Philadelphia, PA (rivalry)	L 6–33		
November 16	Carlisle	Franklin Field; Philadelphia, PA	W 16–14	10,000	
November 23	at Army	The Plain; West Point, NY	L 0–24		
November 28	Cornell	Franklin Field; Philadelphia, PA (rivalry)	L 6–23	20,000	
