= 1901 Rutgers Queensmen football team =

American college football season

1901 Rutgers Queensmen football
- Conference: Independent
- Record: 0–7
- Head coach: Arthur P. Robinson (1st season)
- Captain: William B. Wyckoff
- Home stadium: Neilson Field

1901 Eastern college football independents records
	Conf.			Overall
Team	W	L	T	W		L		T
Harvard		–		12	–	0	–	0
Yale		–		11	–	1	–	1
Cornell		–		11	–	1	–	0
Dartmouth		–		10	–	1	–	0
Massachusetts		–		9	–	1	–	0
Princeton		–		9	–	1	–	1
Syracuse		–		7	–	1	–	0
Geneva		–		7	–	1	–	1
Holy Cross		–		7	–	1	–	1
Army		–		5	–	1	–	2
Western U. of Penn		–		7	–	2	–	1
Lafayette		–		9	–	3	–	0
Swarthmore		–		8	–	2	–	2
Washington & Jefferson		–		6	–	2	–	2
Franklin & Marshall		–		7	–	3	–	1
Penn		–		10	–	5	–	0
Buffalo		–		4	–	2	–	0
Columbia		–		8	–	5	–	0
Fordham		–		2	–	1	–	1
Penn State		–		5	–	3	–	0
Bucknell		–		6	–	4	–	0
Temple		–		3	–	2	–	0
NYU		–		4	–	3	–	1
Pittsburgh College		–		3	–	3	–	0
Tufts		–		6	–	6	–	1
Vermont		–		5	–	5	–	1
Carlisle		–		5	–	7	–	1
Dickinson		–		4	–	6	–	0
Brown		–		4	–	7	–	1
Villanova		–		2	–	3	–	0
Drexel		–		2	–	5	–	1
Colgate		–		2	–	5	–	0
Boston College		–		1	–	8	–	0
Lehigh		–		1	–	11	–	0
New Hampshire		–		0	–	6	–	0
Rutgers		–		0	–	7	–	0

The 1901 Rutgers Queensmen football team was an American football team that represented Rutgers University as an independent during the 1901 college football season. In its first and only season under head coach Arthur P. Robinson, the team compiled a 0–7 record and was outscored by their opponents, 133 to 5. William B. Wyckoff was the team captain.

== Schedule ==
Date	Opponent	Site	Result	Source
October 2	Columbia	Neilson Field; New Brunswick, NJ	L 0–27	
October 5	Manhattan	Neilson Field; New Brunswick, NJ	L 0–10	
October 12	at Ursinus	Ursinus gridiron; Collegeville, PA	L 0–30	
October 19	at Swarthmore	Whittier Field; Swarthmore, PA	L 0–27	
October 26	NYU	Neilson Field; New Brunswick, NJ	L 0–16	
November 2	Delaware	Neilson Field; New Brunswick, NJ	L 5–6	
November 9	at Haverford	Haverford, PA	L 0–17	
