= 1901 Harvard Crimson football team =

American college football season

1901 Harvard Crimson football
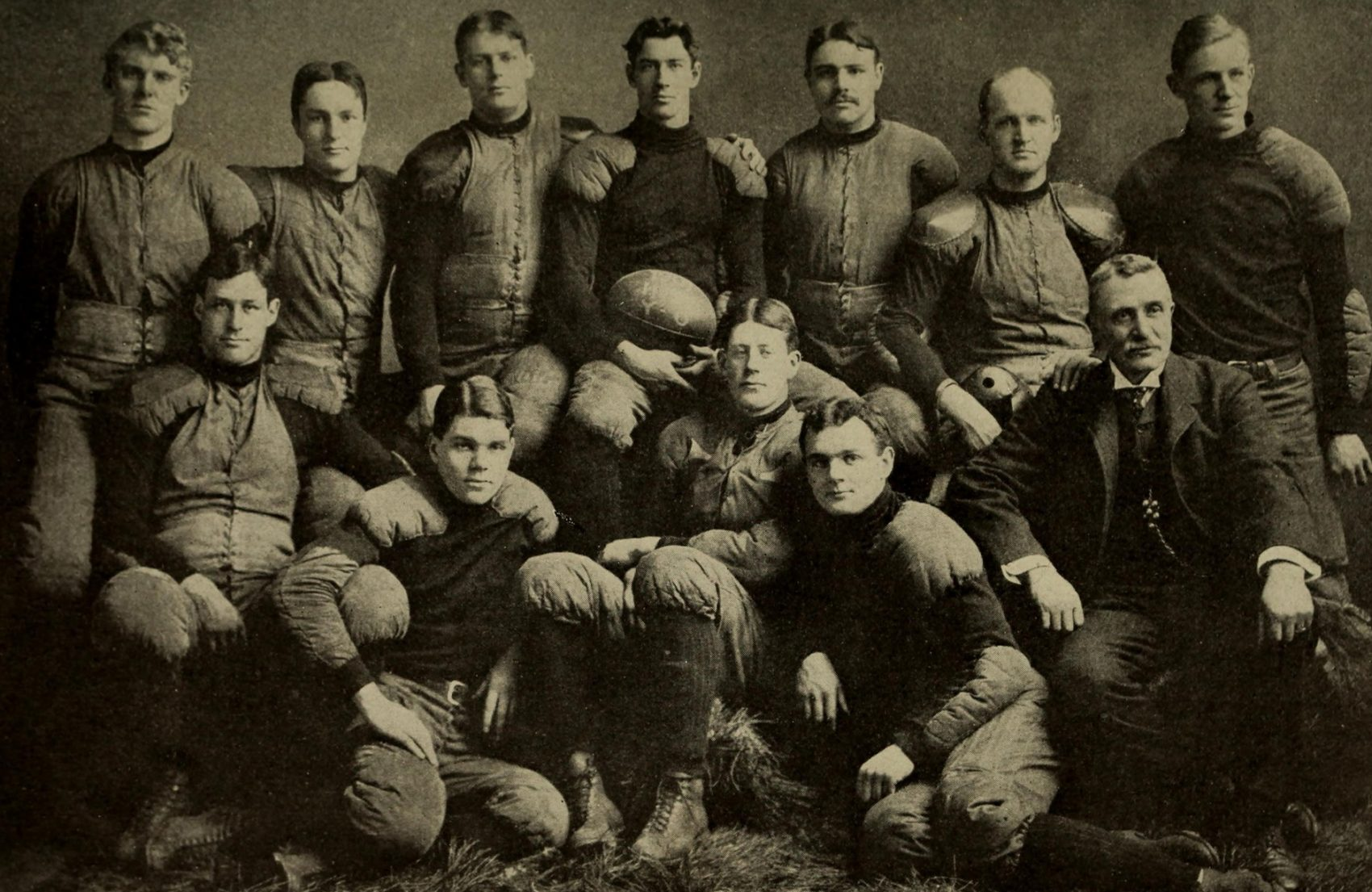

National champion (Billingsley, Davis)
- Conference: Independent
- Record: 12–0
- Head coach: Bill Reid (1st season)
- Home stadium: Soldier's Field

1901 Eastern college football independents records
	Conf.			Overall
Team	W	L	T	W		L		T
Harvard		–		12	–	0	–	0
Yale		–		11	–	1	–	1
Cornell		–		11	–	1	–	0
Dartmouth		–		10	–	1	–	0
Massachusetts		–		9	–	1	–	0
Princeton		–		9	–	1	–	1
Syracuse		–		7	–	1	–	0
Geneva		–		7	–	1	–	1
Holy Cross		–		7	–	1	–	1
Army		–		5	–	1	–	2
Western U. of Penn		–		7	–	2	–	1
Lafayette		–		9	–	3	–	0
Swarthmore		–		8	–	2	–	2
Washington & Jefferson		–		6	–	2	–	2
Franklin & Marshall		–		7	–	3	–	1
Penn		–		10	–	5	–	0
Buffalo		–		4	–	2	–	0
Columbia		–		8	–	5	–	0
Fordham		–		2	–	1	–	1
Penn State		–		5	–	3	–	0
Bucknell		–		6	–	4	–	0
Temple		–		3	–	2	–	0
NYU		–		4	–	3	–	1
Pittsburgh College		–		3	–	3	–	0
Tufts		–		6	–	6	–	1
Vermont		–		5	–	5	–	1
Carlisle		–		5	–	7	–	1
Dickinson		–		4	–	6	–	0
Brown		–		4	–	7	–	1
Villanova		–		2	–	3	–	0
Drexel		–		2	–	5	–	1
Colgate		–		2	–	5	–	0
Boston College		–		1	–	8	–	0
Lehigh		–		1	–	11	–	0
New Hampshire		–		0	–	6	–	0
Rutgers		–		0	–	7	–	0

The 1901 Harvard Crimson football team was an American football team that represented Harvard University as an independent during the 1901 college football season. In its first season under head coach Bill Reid, the team compiled a 12–0 record, shut out nine of 12 opponents, and outscored all opponents by a total of 254 to 24.

When Harvard met Yale at season's end, it was considered to be for the national championship by the contemporaneous media. Harper's Weekly (photo below) and the Chicago Tribune recognized the team as national champions. In addition, the team was retrospectively named as the national champion by two selectors, the Billingsley Report and Parke H. Davis. (Note: Until it was amended in 2026, the NCAA Records Book stated "Yale" for 1901, an error that had been perpetuated since the first appearance of Parke Davis' selections in the NCAA book about 1995.) Three other selectors, the Helms Athletic Foundation, Houlgate System, and the National Championship Foundation retrospectively named Michigan as the 1901 national champion.

Nine Harvard players received first-team honors from Walter Camp (WC) or Caspar Whitney (CW) on the 1901 All-America team:

- Fullback Thomas Graydon (WC-1, CW-1);
- Halfback Robert Kernan (WC-1, CW-1);
- Halfback A. W. Ristine (WC-2);
- Tackle Oliver Cutts (WC-1, CW-1);
- Tackle Crawford Blagden (WC-2; CW-1);
- Guard William George Lee (WC-1, CW-2);
- Guard Charles A. Barnard (WC-2, CW-1);
- End Dave Campbell (WC-1, CW-2); and
- End Edward Bowditch (WC-2, CW-1).

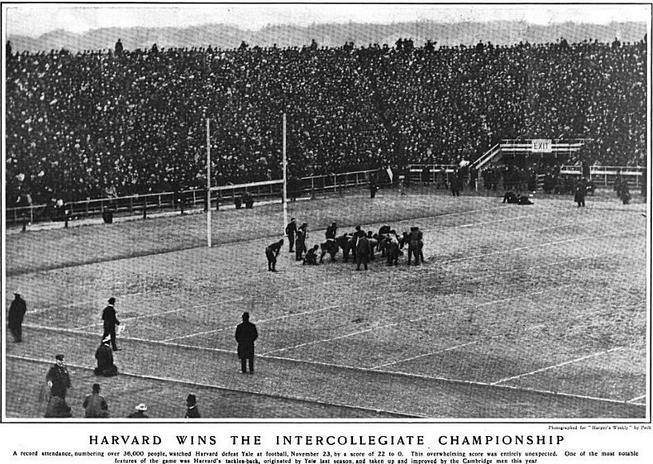

== Schedule ==
Date	Time	Opponent	Site	Result	Attendance	Source
September 28	3:30 p.m.	Williams	Soldier's Field; Boston, MA	W 16–0	1,500	
October 2		Bowdoin	Soldier's Field; Boston, MA	W 12–0		
October 5		Bates	Soldier's Field; Boston, MA	W 16–6		
October 9	4:00 p.m.	Amherst	Soldier's Field; Boston, MA	W 11–0	3,000	
October 12		Columbia	Soldier's Field; Boston, MA	W 18–0		
October 16		Wesleyan	Soldier's Field; Boston, MA	W 16–0		
October 19		at Army	The Plain; West Point, NY	W 6–0		
October 26		Carlisle	Soldier's Field; Boston, MA	W 29–0		
November 2		Brown	Soldier's Field; Boston, MA	W 48–0	5,000	
November 9		at Penn	Franklin Field; Philadelphia, PA (rivalry)	W 33–6		
November 16		Dartmouth	Soldier's Field; Boston, MA (rivalry)	W 27–12		
November 23		Yale	Soldier's Field; Boston, MA (rivalry)	W 22–0		
