= 1901 Holy Cross football team =

American college football season

1901 Holy Cross football
- Conference: Independent
- Record: 7–1–1
- Head coach: Maurice Connor (3rd season)
- Captain: Michael J. Lawlor
- Home stadium: Worcester College Grounds, Worcester Oval

1901 Eastern college football independents records
	Conf.			Overall
Team	W	L	T	W		L		T
Harvard		–		12	–	0	–	0
Yale		–		11	–	1	–	1
Cornell		–		11	–	1	–	0
Dartmouth		–		10	–	1	–	0
Massachusetts		–		9	–	1	–	0
Princeton		–		9	–	1	–	1
Syracuse		–		7	–	1	–	0
Geneva		–		7	–	1	–	1
Holy Cross		–		7	–	1	–	1
Army		–		5	–	1	–	2
Western U. of Penn		–		7	–	2	–	1
Lafayette		–		9	–	3	–	0
Swarthmore		–		8	–	2	–	2
Washington & Jefferson		–		6	–	2	–	2
Frankin & Marshall		–		7	–	3	–	1
Penn		–		10	–	5	–	0
Buffalo		–		4	–	2	–	0
Columbia		–		8	–	5	–	0
Fordham		–		2	–	1	–	1
Penn State		–		5	–	3	–	0
Bucknell		–		6	–	4	–	0
Temple		–		3	–	2	–	0
NYU		–		4	–	3	–	1
Pittsburgh College		–		3	–	3	–	0
Tufts		–		6	–	6	–	1
Vermont		–		5	–	5	–	1
Carlisle		–		5	–	7	–	1
Dickinson		–		4	–	6	–	0
Brown		–		4	–	7	–	1
Villanova		–		2	–	3	–	0
Drexel		–		2	–	5	–	1
Colgate		–		2	–	5	–	0
Boston College		–		1	–	8	–	0
Lehigh		–		1	–	11	–	0
New Hampshire		–		0	–	6	–	0
Rutgers		–		0	–	7	–	0

The 1901 Holy Cross football team was an American football team that represented the College of the Holy Cross as an independent during the 1901 college football season. In its third season under head coach Maurice Connor, the team compiled a 7–1–1 record and outscored opponents by a total of 126 to 43.

The 1901 season was the most successful in the school's history to that time.

== Schedule ==
Date	Opponent	Site	Result	Source
September 28	Massachusetts	Worcester College Grounds; Worcester, MA	L 0–17	
October 5	at MIT	Charles River Park; Cambridge, MA	W 15–0	
October 12	Worcester Polytechnic	Worcester Oval; Worcester, MA	W 14–5	
October 19	Tufts	Worcester College Grounds; Worcester, MA	W 12–5	
October 26	at Brown	Andrews Field; Providence, RI	T 6–6	
November 2	at Phillips Andover Academy	Andover, MA	W 37–5	
November 9	Boston College	Worcester College Grounds; Worcester, MA (rivalry)	W 11–0	
November 16	at Pittsfield A.C.	Pittsfield, MA	W 14–0	
November 28	Tufts	Worcester College Grounds; Worcester, MA	W 17–5	
