= 1901 Swarthmore Quakers football team =

American college football season

1901 Swarthmore Quakers football
- Conference: Independent
- Record: 8–2–2
- Head coach: George H. Brooke (3rd season)
- Home stadium: Whittier Field

1901 Eastern college football independents records
	Conf.			Overall
Team	W	L	T	W		L		T
Harvard		–		12	–	0	–	0
Yale		–		11	–	1	–	1
Cornell		–		11	–	1	–	0
Dartmouth		–		10	–	1	–	0
Massachusetts		–		9	–	1	–	0
Princeton		–		9	–	1	–	1
Syracuse		–		7	–	1	–	0
Geneva		–		7	–	1	–	1
Holy Cross		–		7	–	1	–	1
Army		–		5	–	1	–	2
Western U. of Penn		–		7	–	2	–	1
Lafayette		–		9	–	3	–	0
Swarthmore		–		8	–	2	–	2
Washington & Jefferson		–		6	–	2	–	2
Franklin & Marshall		–		7	–	3	–	1
Penn		–		10	–	5	–	0
Buffalo		–		4	–	2	–	0
Columbia		–		8	–	5	–	0
Fordham		–		2	–	1	–	1
Penn State		–		5	–	3	–	0
Bucknell		–		6	–	4	–	0
Temple		–		3	–	2	–	0
NYU		–		4	–	3	–	1
Pittsburgh College		–		3	–	3	–	0
Tufts		–		6	–	6	–	1
Vermont		–		5	–	5	–	1
Carlisle		–		5	–	7	–	1
Dickinson		–		4	–	6	–	0
Brown		–		4	–	7	–	1
Villanova		–		2	–	3	–	0
Drexel		–		2	–	5	–	1
Colgate		–		2	–	5	–	0
Boston College		–		1	–	8	–	0
Lehigh		–		1	–	11	–	0
New Hampshire		–		0	–	6	–	0
Rutgers		–		0	–	7	–	0

The 1901 Swarthmore Quakers football team was an American football team that represented Swarthmore College as an independent during the 1901 college football season. The team compiled an 8–2–2 record and outscored opponents by a total of 148 to 89. George H. Brooke was the head coach.

== Schedule ==
Date	Opponent	Site	Result	Attendance	Source
September 28	Swarthmore alumni	Swarthmore, PA	W 16–6		
October 5	Ursinus	Swarthmore, PA	W 17–5		
October 9	at Penn	Franklin Field; Philadelphia, PA	L 0–28		
October 12	Delaware	Whittier Field; Swarthmore, PA	W 10–0	500	
October 16	at Lehigh	Bethlehem, PA	W 6–5		
October 19	Rutgers	Whittier Field; Swarthmore, PA	W 27–0		
October 26	at St. John's (MD)	Annapolis, MD	W 17–11		
October 30	Pennsylvania Military	Swarthmore, PA	W 33–0		
November 2	at Franklin & Marshall	Lancaster, PA	T 0–0		
November 9	at Dickinson	Carlisle, PA	L 6–28		
November 19	Medico-Chirugical	Swarthmore, PA	W 10–0		
November 23	at Haverford	Haverford, PA (rivalry)	T 6–6		
