= Wilbur Hockensmith =

American football player and coach (1878–1951)

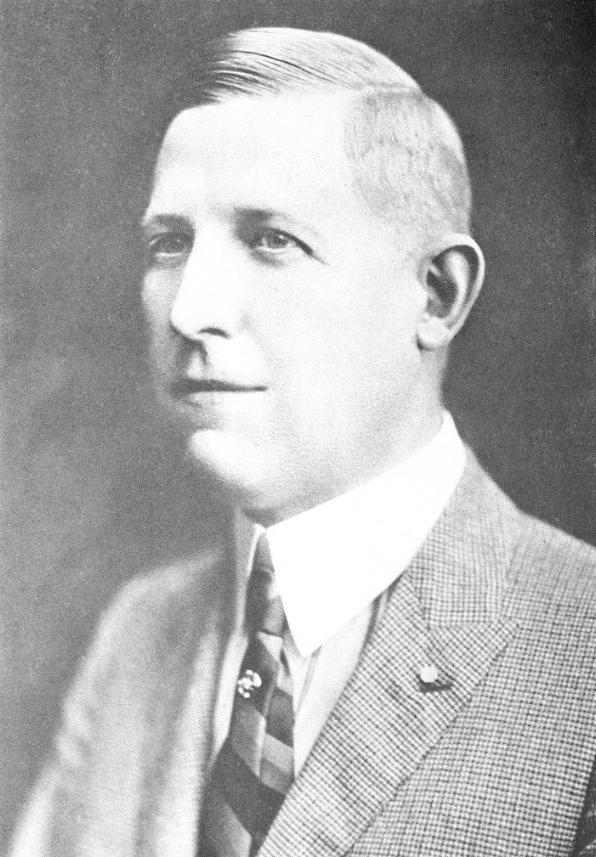

Biographical details
- Born: August 17, 1878; Irwin, Pennsylvania, U.S.
- Died: August 19, 1951 (aged 73); Irwin, Pennsylvania, U.S.

Coaching career (HC unless noted)
- 1901: Western U. of Pennsylvania

Head coaching record
- Overall: 7–2–1

Wilbur Darwin Hockensmith Sr. (August 17, 1878 – August 19, 1951) was the head coach of the football team at the Western University of Pennsylvania, today known as the University of Pittsburgh Panthers, in 1901. On October 5, 1901, Hockensmith led the school to a victory over West Virginia University, a 12–0 shutout in Morgantown. This was Pitt's first victory in the Backyard Brawl. The team would also post a record 7 wins in 1901 under Hockensmith.

== Biography ==
Wilbur Hockensmith was born in Irwin, Pennsylvania on August 17, 1878. He served in the 14th Pennsylvania Volunteer Infantry during the Spanish–American War. He married Mabel C. Elderkin on September 14, 1905.

Hockensmith, who also played left guard for the university's football team, graduated from the Western University in 1901 with a degree in mechanical engineering. He later worked for his family's business, the Hockensmith Corporation, which ran a foundry in Irwin, Pennsylvania. Wilbur, his father (Frank Hockensmith) and son (Wilbur D. Hockensmith, Jr.) all served as the company's presidents.

Wilbur Hockensmith died at his home in Irwin on August 19, 1951, and was buried at Irwin Union Cemetery.

== Head coaching record ==
Year	Team	Overall	Conference	Standing	Bowl/playoffs
Western University of Pennsylvania (Independent) (1901)
1901	Western University of Pennsylvania	7–2–1			
Western University of Pennsylvania:		7–2–1			
Total:		7–2–1			
