= 1901 Yale Bulldogs football team =

American college football season

1901 Yale Bulldogs football
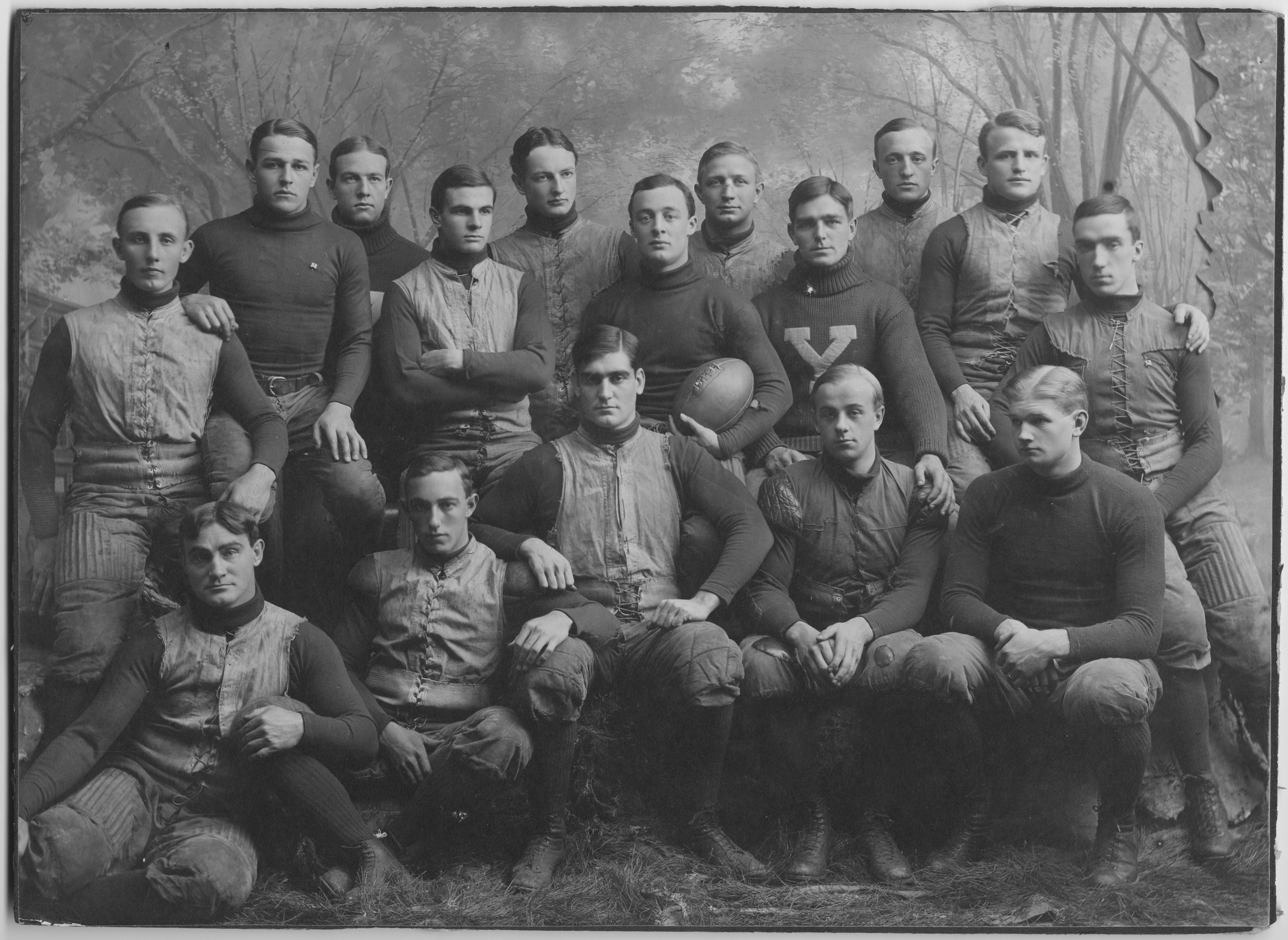
- Conference: Independent
- Record: 11–1–1
- Head coach: George S. Stillman (1st season)
- Captain: John de Saulles
- Home stadium: Yale Field

1901 Eastern college football independents records
| | Conf. | | | Overall |
| Team | W | L | T | W | | L | | T |
|---|---|---|---|---|---|---|---|---|
| Harvard | | – | | 12 | – | 0 | – | 0 |
| Yale | | – | | 11 | – | 1 | – | 1 |
| Cornell | | – | | 11 | – | 1 | – | 0 |
| Dartmouth | | – | | 10 | – | 1 | – | 0 |
| Massachusetts | | – | | 9 | – | 1 | – | 0 |
| Princeton | | – | | 9 | – | 1 | – | 1 |
| Syracuse | | – | | 7 | – | 1 | – | 0 |
| Geneva | | – | | 7 | – | 1 | – | 1 |
| Holy Cross | | – | | 7 | – | 1 | – | 1 |
| Army | | – | | 5 | – | 1 | – | 2 |
| Western U. of Penn | | – | | 7 | – | 2 | – | 1 |
| Lafayette | | – | | 9 | – | 3 | – | 0 |
| Swarthmore | | – | | 8 | – | 2 | – | 2 |
| Washington & Jefferson | | – | | 6 | – | 2 | – | 2 |
| Franklin & Marshall | | – | | 7 | – | 3 | – | 1 |
| Penn | | – | | 10 | – | 5 | – | 0 |
| Buffalo | | – | | 4 | – | 2 | – | 0 |
| Columbia | | – | | 8 | – | 5 | – | 0 |
| Fordham | | – | | 2 | – | 1 | – | 1 |
| Penn State | | – | | 5 | – | 3 | – | 0 |
| Bucknell | | – | | 6 | – | 4 | – | 0 |
| Temple | | – | | 3 | – | 2 | – | 0 |
| NYU | | – | | 4 | – | 3 | – | 1 |
| Pittsburgh College | | – | | 3 | – | 3 | – | 0 |
| Tufts | | – | | 6 | – | 6 | – | 1 |
| Vermont | | – | | 5 | – | 5 | – | 1 |
| Carlisle | | – | | 5 | – | 7 | – | 1 |
| Dickinson | | – | | 4 | – | 6 | – | 0 |
| Brown | | – | | 4 | – | 7 | – | 1 |
| Villanova | | – | | 2 | – | 3 | – | 0 |
| Drexel | | – | | 2 | – | 5 | – | 1 |
| Colgate | | – | | 2 | – | 5 | – | 0 |
| Boston College | | – | | 1 | – | 8 | – | 0 |
| Lehigh | | – | | 1 | – | 11 | – | 0 |
| New Hampshire | | – | | 0 | – | 6 | – | 0 |
| Rutgers | | – | | 0 | – | 7 | – | 0 |

The 1901 Yale Bulldogs football team was an American football team that represented Yale University as an independent during the 1901 college football season. In its first season under head coach George S. Stillman, the team compiled an 11–1–1 record and outscored opponents by a total of 251 to 37.

Center Henry Holt was selected by Walter Camp as the first team center on the 1901 All-America team. Other notable players on the 1901 Yale team included halfback George B. Chadwick, quarterback John de Saulles, end Joseph R. Swan, tackle James Hogan, and guard Herman Olcott.

Following the Bulldogs season-ending loss to Harvard, contemporary coverage deemed Harvard undisputed collegiate champion. Years later, Harvard was retrospectively selected as the national champion by Parke H. Davis; the NCAA's record book erroneously listed Yale as Davis' 1901 champion until its amendment in 2026.

== Schedule ==
| Date | Opponent | Site | Result | Attendance | Source |
|---|---|---|---|---|---|
| September 28 | Trinity (CT) | Yale Field; New Haven, CT | W 23–0 | | |
| October 2 | Amherst | Yale Field; New Haven, CT | W 6–0 | | |
| October 5 | Tufts | Yale Field; New Haven, CT | W 29–5 | | |
| October 9 | Wesleyan | Yale Field; New Haven, CT | W 24–0 | | |
| October 12 | at Navy | Worden Field; Annapolis, MD | W 24–0 | | |
| October 16 | Bowdoin | Yale Field; New Haven, CT | W 45–0 | | |
| October 19 | Penn State | Yale Field; New Haven, CT | W 22–0 | | |
| October 22 | Bates | Yale Field; New Haven, CT | W 21–0 | 12,000 | |
| October 26 | Columbia | Yale Field; New Haven, CT | W 10–5 | | |
| November 2 | at Army | The Plain; West Point, NY | T 5–5 | | |
| November 9 | Orange Athletic Club | Yale Field; New Haven, CT | W 35–0 | | |
| November 16 | Princeton | Yale Field; New Haven, CT (rivalry) | W 12–0 | > 19,000 | |
| November 23 | at Harvard | Soldier's Field; Cambridge, MA (rivalry) | L 0–22 | | |

== Roster ==
- Andrews, G
- Benham, HB
- James Bloomer
- Burke, T
- George B. Chadwick, HB
- Ralston R. Coffin
- Cruikshank, G
- John de Saulles, QB
- Drummond, T
- Easton, HB
- Ferguson, E
- Fox, HB
- Edgar Glass, G
- George A. Goss, T
- Charles Gould, E
- Chauncey J. Hamlin, C
- J. B. Hart, HB
- Hinkle, HB
- James Hogan, T
- Henry Holt, C
- Willard Hyatt, E
- Thomas R. Johnson, G
- Philip H. Kunzig, T
- Harold G. Metcalf, HB
- Morehead, E
- Morris, QB
- Herman Olcott, G
- Jack Owsley, HB
- Charles D. Rafferty, E
- Foster Rockwell, QB
- Joseph Clinton Roraback
- Shaw, HB
- Willard B. Soper, HB
- Strong, FB
- Joseph Rockwell Swan, T
- S. Oakley Van der Poel, FB
- S. Dwight Ward, E
- Clarence A Weymouth, FB
- Frederick W. Wilhelmi, FB
