= Chauncey L. Berrien =

American football player and coach (1879–1932)

Biographical details
- Born: July 23, 1879; Galesburg, Illinois, U.S.
- Died: April 22, 1932 (aged 52); Rochester, Minnesota, U.S.

Playing career
- 1900–1901: Columbia
- Position: Fullback

Coaching career (HC unless noted)
- 1902: Hamilton
- 1903: DePauw

Head coaching record
- Overall: 6–8–2

Chauncey L. Berrien (July 23, 1879 – April 22, 1932) was an American football player and coach. He served as the head football coach at Hamilton College in Clinton, New York in 1902 and at DePauw University in Greencastle, Indiana in 1903, compiling a career college football coaching record of 6–8–2. Berrien played college football at Columbia University, where he starred as a fullback.

== Head coaching record ==
Year	Team	Overall	Conference	Standing	Bowl/playoffs
Hamilton Continentals (Independent) (1902)
1902	Hamilton	4–2–1			
Hamilton:		4–2–1			
DePauw (Independent) (1903)
1903	DePauw	2–6–1			
DePauw:		2–6–1			
Total:		6–8–2			
