= Dartmouth–New Hampshire football rivalry =

American college football rivalry

- Dartmouth Big Green New Hampshire Wildcats
- Sport: Football
- First meeting: October 2, 1901; Dartmouth, 51–0
- Latest meeting: September 20, 2025; Dartmouth, 27–20
- Next meeting: September 25, 2027

Statistics
- Total meetings: 43
- All-time series: New Hampshire, 21–20–2
- Largest victory: New Hampshire, 66–12 (1986)
- Longest win streak: Dartmouth, 16 (1901–1972)
- Longest unbeaten streak: New Hampshire, 20 (1979–2014)
- Current win streak: Dartmouth, 1 (2025–present)

Locations of Dartmouth and New Hampshire

The Dartmouth–New Hampshire football rivalry, referred to as the Granite Bowl, is an American college football rivalry game played between the Dartmouth College Big Green and University of New Hampshire Wildcats. The two teams first met in 1901 and have played regularly since then. The longest gap between games was 22 years, between 1934 and 1956. Dartmouth was initially dominant, winning 17 of the first 19 games. Then New Hampshire won 18 of the next 19 games. New Hampshire leads the series 21–20–2, with the most recent game played in 2025.

== Game results ==
Dartmouth victories	New Hampshire victories	Tie games

No.	Date	Location	Winner	Score
1	October 2, 1901	Hanover, NH	Dartmouth	51–0
2	October 9, 1907	Hanover, NH	Dartmouth	10–0
3	September 23, 1916	Hanover, NH	Dartmouth	33–0
4	October 27, 1917	Hanover, NH	Dartmouth	21–6
5	October 8, 1921	Hanover, NH	Dartmouth	24–0
6	November 5, 1932	Hanover, NH	Dartmouth	25–0
7	November 10, 1934	Hanover, NH	Dartmouth	21–7
8	September 29, 1956	Hanover, NH	Dartmouth	13–0
9	September 28, 1957	Hanover, NH	Dartmouth	27–0
10	September 24, 1960	Hanover, NH	Dartmouth	7–6
11	September 30, 1961	Hanover, NH	Dartmouth	28–3
12	September 26, 1964	Durham, NH	Dartmouth	40–0
13	September 25, 1965	Hanover, NH	Dartmouth	56–6
14	September 28, 1968	Hanover, NH	Dartmouth	21–0
15	September 27, 1969	Durham, NH	Dartmouth	31–0
16	September 30, 1972	Hanover, NH	Dartmouth	24–14
17	September 29, 1973	Durham, NH	New Hampshire	10–9
18	September 25, 1976	Hanover, NH	Dartmouth	24–13
19	September 29, 1979	Durham, NH	Tie	10–10
20	September 27, 1980	Hanover, NH	New Hampshire	24–7
21	September 29, 1984	Hanover, NH	New Hampshire	38–10
22	September 28, 1985	Durham, NH	New Hampshire	23–7

No.	Date	Location	Winner	Score
23	September 27, 1986	Hanover, NH	New Hampshire	66–12
24	September 26, 1987	Durham, NH	New Hampshire	41–3
25	September 29, 1990	Durham, NH	Tie	21–21
26	September 26, 1992	Durham, NH	New Hampshire	45–27
27	October 9, 1993	Hanover, NH	New Hampshire	14–7
28	September 23, 2000	Durham, NH	New Hampshire	42–21
29	September 22, 2001	Hanover, NH	New Hampshire	42–38
30	September 28, 2002	Hanover, NH	New Hampshire	29–26
31	September 27, 2003	Durham, NH	New Hampshire	42–17
32	September 25, 2004	Hanover, NH	New Hampshire	45–24
33	September 24, 2005	Durham, NH	New Hampshire	49–20
34	September 23, 2006	Hanover, NH	New Hampshire	56–14
35	September 22, 2007	Durham, NH	New Hampshire	52–31
36	September 27, 2008	Hanover, NH	New Hampshire	42–6
37	September 26, 2009	Durham, NH	New Hampshire	44–14
38	September 27, 2014	Durham, NH	New Hampshire	52–19
39	September 17, 2016	Hanover, NH	Dartmouth	22–21
40	October 16, 2021	Durham, NH	Dartmouth	38–21
41	October 15, 2022	Hanover, NH	New Hampshire	14–0
42	September 16, 2023	Durham, NH	New Hampshire	24–7
43	September 20, 2025	Hanover, NH	Dartmouth	27–20
Series: New Hampshire leads 21–20–2

== See also ==
- List of NCAA college football rivalry games
