= 1900 college football rankings =

- Season: 1900
- Bowl season: 1900–01 bowl games
- End of season champions: Yale

The 1900 college football season rankings included a ranking by New York City newspaper The Sun.

== The Sun ==
In December 1900, New York City newspaper The Sun published a top-five ranking of the big Eastern elevens.

Rank	Team	Record
1	Yale	12–0
2	Harvard	10–1
3	Penn	12–1
4	Columbia	7–3–1
5	Lafayette	9–2

== See also ==
- 1900 College Football All-America Team
