= 1900 Princeton Tigers football team =

American college football season

1900 Princeton Tigers football
- Conference: Independent
- Record: 8–3
- Head coach: None
- Captain: Williamson Pell
- Home stadium: Osborne Field

1900 Eastern college football independents records
	Conf.			Overall
Team	W	L	T	W		L		T
Yale		–		12	–	0	–	0
Penn		–		12	–	1	–	0
Harvard		–		10	–	1	–	0
Cornell		–		10	–	2	–	0
Geneva		–		5	–	1	–	1
Lafayette		–		9	–	2	–	0
Syracuse		–		7	–	2	–	1
Princeton		–		8	–	3	–	0
Drexel		–		5	–	2	–	0
Fordham		–		3	–	1	–	1
Army		–		7	–	3	–	1
Brown		–		7	–	3	–	1
Columbia		–		7	–	3	–	1
Villanova		–		5	–	2	–	2
Washington & Jefferson		–		6	–	3	–	1
Swarthmore		–		6	–	3	–	2
Holy Cross		–		5	–	3	–	1
Carlisle		–		6	–	4	–	1
Buffalo		–		3	–	2	–	2
Western Univ. of Penn		–		5	–	4	–	0
Bucknell		–		4	–	4	–	1
Dickinson		–		5	–	5	–	0
Pittsburgh College		–		3	–	3	–	1
Rutgers		–		4	–	4	–	0
Vermont		–		4	–	4	–	1
Lehigh		–		5	–	6	–	0
Franklin & Marshall		–		4	–	5	–	0
Temple		–		3	–	4	–	1
Penn State		–		4	–	6	–	1
Amherst		–		4	–	7	–	1
Dartmouth		–		2	–	4	–	2
NYU		–		3	–	6	–	1
Tufts		–		3	–	6	–	1
Wesleyan		–		3	–	6	–	1
New Hampshire		–		1	–	5	–	1
Colgate		–		2	–	8	–	0
CCNY		–		0	–	1	–	0

The 1900 Princeton Tigers football team represented Princeton University in the 1900 college football season. The team finished with an 8–3 record. The Tigers won their first eight games by a combined score of 159 to 10, but then lost the last three games of the season against Cornell, Columbia and Yale. No Princeton players received first-team honors on the 1900 College Football All-America Team.

== Schedule ==
Date	Time	Opponent	Site	Result	Attendance	Source
October 3	3:30 p.m.	Stevens	Osborne Field; Princeton, NJ	W 40–0		
October 6		Lehigh	Osborne Field; Princeton, NJ	W 12–5		
October 10		Penn State	Princeton, NJ	W 26–0		
October 12		at Baltimore Medical	Union Park; Baltimore, MD	W 11–0	1,500	
October 13		at Navy	Worden Field; Annapolis, MD	W 5–0		
October 17		Syracuse	Osborne Field; Princeton, NJ	W 43–0		
October 20		at Lafayette	Easton, PA	W 5–0	4,000	
October 27	3:10 p.m.	at Brown	Andrews Field; Providence, RI	W 17–5	5,000	
November 3	2:45 p.m.	Cornell	Princeton, NJ	L 0–12		
November 6	2:45 p.m.	at Columbia	Manhattan Field; New York, NY	L 5–6	10,000	
November 17	2:45 p.m.	Yale	University Field; Princeton, NJ (rivalry)	L 5–29	15,000	

== Roster ==
- Black, T
- Brown, G
- Butkiewits, C
- Dana, G
- Ralph Tipton Davis, E
- A. V. Duncan, QB
- Fisher, G
- Forney, HB
- Hale, C
- Hart, HB
- Howard Henry, HB
- Hodgman, HB
- Levick, HB
- Little, E
- Losey, C
- Mattis, FB
- R. McClave, E
- S. McClave, HB
- McCord, T
- Meier, QB
- Miller, G
- Marshall Mills, G
- Morse, HB
- Pearson, FB
- Williamson Pell, T
- Riggs, T
- Bill Roper, E
- Sheffield, T
- Smith, HB
- Underhill, FB
- Wright, G
