= 1900 Rutgers Queensmen football team =

American college football season

1900 Rutgers Queensmen football
- Conference: Independent
- Record: 4–4
- Head coach: Michael F. Daly (1st season)
- Captain: Oliver D. Mann
- Home stadium: Neilson Field

1900 Eastern college football independents records
	Conf.			Overall
Team	W	L	T	W		L		T
Yale		–		12	–	0	–	0
Penn		–		12	–	1	–	0
Harvard		–		10	–	1	–	0
Cornell		–		10	–	2	–	0
Geneva		–		5	–	1	–	1
Lafayette		–		9	–	2	–	0
Syracuse		–		7	–	2	–	1
Princeton		–		8	–	3	–	0
Drexel		–		5	–	2	–	0
Fordham		–		3	–	1	–	1
Army		–		7	–	3	–	1
Brown		–		7	–	3	–	1
Columbia		–		7	–	3	–	1
Villanova		–		5	–	2	–	2
Washington & Jefferson		–		6	–	3	–	1
Swarthmore		–		6	–	3	–	2
Holy Cross		–		5	–	3	–	1
Carlisle		–		6	–	4	–	1
Buffalo		–		3	–	2	–	2
Western Univ. of Penn		–		5	–	4	–	0
Bucknell		–		4	–	4	–	1
Dickinson		–		5	–	5	–	0
Pittsburgh College		–		3	–	3	–	1
Rutgers		–		4	–	4	–	0
Vermont		–		4	–	4	–	1
Lehigh		–		5	–	6	–	0
Franklin & Marshall		–		4	–	5	–	0
Temple		–		3	–	4	–	1
Penn State		–		4	–	6	–	1
Amherst		–		4	–	7	–	1
Dartmouth		–		2	–	4	–	2
NYU		–		3	–	6	–	1
Tufts		–		3	–	6	–	1
Wesleyan		–		3	–	6	–	1
New Hampshire		–		1	–	5	–	1
Colgate		–		2	–	8	–	0
CCNY		–		0	–	1	–	0

The 1900 Rutgers Queensmen football team represented Rutgers University as an independent during the 1900 college football season. In their first and only season under head coach Michael F. Daly, the Queensmen compiled a 4–4 record and were outscored by their opponents, 66 to 50. The team captain was Oliver D. Mann.

== Schedule ==
Date	Opponent	Site	Result	Source
September 26	CCNY	Neilson Field; New Brunswick, NJ	W 5–0	
October 3	Columbia	Neilson Field; New Brunswick, NJ	L 0–11	
October 13	Haverford	Neilson Field; New Brunswick, NJ	W 11–0	
October 20	at Lehigh	Bethlehem, PA	L 0–21	
October 27	Ursinus	Neilson Field; New Brunswick, NJ	W 17–0	
November 7	at Army	The Plain; West Point, NY	L 0–23	
November 17	at NYU	Ohio Field; Bronx, NY	W 11–0	
November 24	Union (NY)	Neilson Field; New Brunswick, NJ	L 6–11	
