= 1900 Dartmouth football team =

American college football season

1900 Dartmouth football
- Conference: Independent
- Record: 2–4–2
- Head coach: Frederick E. Jennings (1st season)
- Captain: Frank Lowe
- Home stadium: Alumni Oval

1900 Eastern college football independents records
	Conf.			Overall
Team	W	L	T	W		L		T
Yale		–		12	–	0	–	0
Penn		–		12	–	1	–	0
Harvard		–		10	–	1	–	0
Cornell		–		10	–	2	–	0
Geneva		–		5	–	1	–	1
Lafayette		–		9	–	2	–	0
Syracuse		–		7	–	2	–	1
Princeton		–		8	–	3	–	0
Drexel		–		5	–	2	–	0
Fordham		–		3	–	1	–	1
Army		–		7	–	3	–	1
Brown		–		7	–	3	–	1
Columbia		–		7	–	3	–	1
Villanova		–		5	–	2	–	2
Washington & Jefferson		–		6	–	3	–	1
Swarthmore		–		6	–	3	–	2
Holy Cross		–		5	–	3	–	1
Carlisle		–		6	–	4	–	1
Buffalo		–		3	–	2	–	2
Western Univ. of Penn		–		5	–	4	–	0
Bucknell		–		4	–	4	–	1
Dickinson		–		5	–	5	–	0
Pittsburgh College		–		3	–	3	–	1
Rutgers		–		4	–	4	–	0
Vermont		–		4	–	4	–	1
Lehigh		–		5	–	6	–	0
Franklin & Marshall		–		4	–	5	–	0
Temple		–		3	–	4	–	1
Penn State		–		4	–	6	–	1
Amherst		–		4	–	7	–	1
Dartmouth		–		2	–	4	–	2
NYU		–		3	–	6	–	1
Tufts		–		3	–	6	–	1
Wesleyan		–		3	–	6	–	1
New Hampshire		–		1	–	5	–	1
Colgate		–		2	–	8	–	0
CCNY		–		0	–	1	–	0

The 1900 Dartmouth football team was an American football team that represented Dartmouth College as an independent during the 1900 college football season. In its first and only season under head coach Frederick E. Jennings, the team compiled a 2–4–2 record and was outscored by a total of 68 to 38. Frank Lowe was the team captain. The team played its home games at Alumni Oval in Hanover, New Hampshire.

== Schedule ==
Date	Time	Opponent	Site	Result	Source
September 29		Phillips Exeter Academy	Alumni Oval; Hanover, NH	W 10–0	
October 6		Union (NY)	Alumni Oval; Hanover, NH	T 0–0	
October 13	3:15 p.m.	vs. Yale	Cedar St. grounds; Newton, MA	L 0–17	
October 17		at Vermont	Athletic Park; Burlington, VT	T 0–0	
October 20		Tufts	Alumni Oval; Hanover, NH	W 12–0	
October 27		at Cornell	Percy Field; Ithaca, NY (rivalry)	L 6–23	
November 3		Wesleyan	Alumni Oval; Hanover, NH	L 5–16	
November 17		at Brown	Alumni Field; Hanover, NH	L 5–12	
