= 1900 Holy Cross football team =

American college football season

1900 Holy Cross football
- Conference: Independent
- Record: 4–4–1
- Head coach: Maurice Connor (3rd season)
- Captain: W. C. T. O'Sullivan
- Home stadium: Worcester College Grounds, Worcester Oval

1900 Eastern college football independents records
	Conf.			Overall
Team	W	L	T	W		L		T
Yale		–		12	–	0	–	0
Penn		–		12	–	1	–	0
Harvard		–		10	–	1	–	0
Cornell		–		10	–	2	–	0
Geneva		–		5	–	1	–	1
Lafayette		–		9	–	2	–	0
Syracuse		–		7	–	2	–	1
Princeton		–		8	–	3	–	0
Drexel		–		5	–	2	–	0
Fordham		–		3	–	1	–	1
Army		–		7	–	3	–	1
Brown		–		7	–	3	–	1
Columbia		–		7	–	3	–	1
Villanova		–		5	–	2	–	2
Washington & Jefferson		–		6	–	3	–	1
Swarthmore		–		6	–	3	–	2
Holy Cross		–		5	–	3	–	1
Carlisle		–		6	–	4	–	1
Buffalo		–		3	–	2	–	2
Western Univ. of Penn		–		5	–	4	–	0
Bucknell		–		4	–	4	–	1
Dickinson		–		5	–	5	–	0
Pittsburgh College		–		3	–	3	–	1
Rutgers		–		4	–	4	–	0
Vermont		–		4	–	4	–	1
Lehigh		–		5	–	6	–	0
Franklin & Marshall		–		4	–	5	–	0
Temple		–		3	–	4	–	1
Penn State		–		4	–	6	–	1
Amherst		–		4	–	7	–	1
Dartmouth		–		2	–	4	–	2
NYU		–		3	–	6	–	1
Tufts		–		3	–	6	–	1
Wesleyan		–		3	–	6	–	1
New Hampshire		–		1	–	5	–	1
Colgate		–		2	–	8	–	0
CCNY		–		0	–	1	–	0

The 1900 Holy Cross football team was an American football team that represented the College of the Holy Cross as an independent in the 1900 college football season.

In their third year under head coach Maurice Connor, the team compiled a 4–4–1 record. W. C. T. O'Sullivan was the team captain.

The Holy Cross Football Fact Book shows a 5–3–1 record for 1900, but the results table does not match contemporary press reports, with the Andover, Colby and Wesleyan games given the wrong dates, and a win over Worcester Academy shown instead of the loss to Williams.

Holy Cross played its home games at two off-campus fields in Worcester, Massachusetts, the Worcester Oval and the Worcester College Grounds.

== Schedule ==
Date	Opponent	Site	Result	Source
September 22	Massachusetts	Worcester College Grounds; Worcester, MA	W 6–0	
September 29	Worcester Polytechnic	Worcester Oval; Worcester, MA	W 5–0	
October 6	at Brown	Andrews Field; Providence, RI	L 0–18	
October 13	at Phillips Andover Academy	Andover, MA	T 0–0	
October 20	Colby	Worcester Oval; Worcester, MA	W 6–5	
November 3	Williams	Worcester Oval; Worcester, MA	L 0–11	
November 10	at Wesleyan	Andrus Field; Middletown, CT	L 5–11	
November 17	MIT	Worcester Oval; Worcester, MA	W 16–0	
November 24	at Tufts	Cedar Street Grounds; Newton, MA	L 0–27	
