= M. Delmar Ritchie =

American football player, coach, and physician (1875–1916)

Biographical details
- Born: 1875; Philadelphia, Pennsylvania, U.S.
- Died: May 24, 1916; Pittsburgh, Pennsylvania, U.S.

Playing career
- 1893: Dickinson
- Position: Halfback

Coaching career (HC unless noted)
- 1898: Franklin & Marshall
- 1899: Ohio Wesleyan
- 1899: Gettysburg
- 1900: Vermont

Head coaching record
- Overall: 12–11–3

Marion Delmar Ritchie (1875 – May 24, 1916) was an American college football coach and physician. He served as the head football coach at Franklin & Marshall College in Lancaster, Pennsylvania for one season, in 1898, compiling a record of 4–4–2. He also coached at Ohio Wesleyan University in Delaware, Ohio in 1899.

Ritchie was born in Philadelphia, Pennsylvania in 1875. A native of Harrisburg, Pennsylvania, he played college football as a halfback at Dickinson College in 1893. Ritchie also attended Lafayette College before graduating from the Perelman School of Medicine at the University of Pennsylvania in 1899. Thereafter he practiced medicine in Pittsburgh, Pennsylvania. Ritchie died at his home in Pittsburgh on May 24, 1916.

== Head coaching record ==
| Year | Team | Overall | Conference | Standing | Bowl/playoffs |
|---|---|---|---|---|---|
Franklin & Marshall (Independent) (1898)
| 1898 | Franklin & Marshall | 4–4–2 | | | |
| Franklin & Marshall: | | 4–4–2 | | | |
Gettysburg (Independent) (1899)
| 1899 | Gettysburg | 4–3 | | | |
| Gettysburg: | | 4–3 | | | |
Vermont Green and Gold (Independent) (1900)
| 1900 | Vermont | 4–4–1 | | | |
| Vermont: | | 4–4–1 | | | |
| Total: | | 12–11–3 | | | |
