= Nelson B. Hatch =

American football coach (1879–1956)

Biographical details
- Born: February 26, 1879; Bridgeport, Connecticut, U.S.
- Died: April 20, 1956 (aged 77); San Diego County, California, U.S.

Playing career

Football
- 1895–1898: NYU

Baseball
- 1895–1898: NYU
- Position: Quarterback

Coaching career (HC unless noted)

Football
- 1900: NYU

Head coaching record
- Overall: 3–6–1

Nelson Brown Hatch (February 26, 1879 – April 20, 1956) was an American college football player and coach. He was the fourth head football coach at New York University (NYU), serving for one season, in 1900, and leading the NYU Violets to a record of 3–6–1.

Hatch played football at NYU as a quarterback from 1895 to 1898 and was captain of the 1898 NYU Violets football team. He was also captain of the NYU baseball team in 1897 and 1898. Hatch graduated from NYU in 1899.

== Head coaching record ==
Year	Team	Overall	Conference	Standing	Bowl/playoffs
NYU Violets (Independent) (1900)
1900	NYU	3–6–1			
NYU:		3–6–1			
Total:		3–6–1			
