= Frederick E. Jennings =

American lawyer

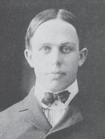
- Jennings as Dartmouth coach in 1900

Biographical details
- Born: September 23, 1877; Everett, Massachusetts, U.S.
- Died: May 24, 1953 (aged 75); Palmer, Massachusetts, U.S.

Playing career
- 1898–1899: Dartmouth
- Position: Halfback

Coaching career (HC unless noted)
- 1900: Dartmouth
- 1908–1909: Dartmouth (assistant)
- 1912: Dartmouth (assistant)

Head coaching record
- Overall: 2–4–2

Frederick Everett Jennings (September 23, 1877 – May 24, 1953) was an American lawyer, banker, and college football coach. He served as the head coach at Dartmouth College in 1900 and amassed a record of 2–4–2.

Jennings was born on September 23, 1877, in native of Everett, Massachusetts. He attended Dartmouth College, from which he graduated in 1900. While at Dartmouth, Jennings played football as a halfback and earned a varsity letter in 1898. As of 2010, Jennings still holds the school record for most touchdowns in a game, which he set in 1898 when he scored seven against Amherst in a 64–6 rout. Charles E. Patterson in Leslie's Weekly named Jennings to his All-American second team in 1899.

Jennings returned to coach his alma mater in 1900, which he did for one season, and amassed a 2–4–2 record. After Dartmouth, Jennings attended and graduated from Harvard Law School in 1903.

Jennings returned to Dartmouth to serve as an assistant football coach in 1908 and 1909. In 1912, he was an assistant under Frank Cavanaugh.

Jennings held professional careers as a lawyer and banker. By 1934, he was serving as president of the Everett Bank and Trust Company and as elected director of the Colonial Beacon Oil Company. Jennings died on May 24, 1953, at Palmer Memorial Hospital in Palmer, Massachusetts.

== Head coaching record ==
Year	Team	Overall	Conference	Standing	Bowl/playoffs
Dartmouth (Independent) (1900)
1900	Dartmouth	2–4–2			
Dartmouth:		2–4–2			
Total:		2–4–2			
