= 1900 Vermont Green and Gold football team =

American college football season

1900 Vermont Green and Gold football
- Conference: Independent
- Record: 4–4–1
- Head coach: M. Delmar Ritchie (1st season)
- Home stadium: Athletic Park

1900 Eastern college football independents records
| | Conf. | | | Overall |
| Team | W | L | T | W | | L | | T |
|---|---|---|---|---|---|---|---|---|
| Yale | | – | | 12 | – | 0 | – | 0 |
| Penn | | – | | 12 | – | 1 | – | 0 |
| Harvard | | – | | 10 | – | 1 | – | 0 |
| Cornell | | – | | 10 | – | 2 | – | 0 |
| Geneva | | – | | 5 | – | 1 | – | 1 |
| Lafayette | | – | | 9 | – | 2 | – | 0 |
| Syracuse | | – | | 7 | – | 2 | – | 1 |
| Princeton | | – | | 8 | – | 3 | – | 0 |
| Drexel | | – | | 5 | – | 2 | – | 0 |
| Fordham | | – | | 3 | – | 1 | – | 1 |
| Army | | – | | 7 | – | 3 | – | 1 |
| Brown | | – | | 7 | – | 3 | – | 1 |
| Columbia | | – | | 7 | – | 3 | – | 1 |
| Villanova | | – | | 5 | – | 2 | – | 2 |
| Washington & Jefferson | | – | | 6 | – | 3 | – | 1 |
| Swarthmore | | – | | 6 | – | 3 | – | 2 |
| Holy Cross | | – | | 5 | – | 3 | – | 1 |
| Carlisle | | – | | 6 | – | 4 | – | 1 |
| Buffalo | | – | | 3 | – | 2 | – | 2 |
| Western Univ. of Penn | | – | | 5 | – | 4 | – | 0 |
| Bucknell | | – | | 4 | – | 4 | – | 1 |
| Dickinson | | – | | 5 | – | 5 | – | 0 |
| Pittsburgh College | | – | | 3 | – | 3 | – | 1 |
| Rutgers | | – | | 4 | – | 4 | – | 0 |
| Vermont | | – | | 4 | – | 4 | – | 1 |
| Lehigh | | – | | 5 | – | 6 | – | 0 |
| Franklin & Marshall | | – | | 4 | – | 5 | – | 0 |
| Temple | | – | | 3 | – | 4 | – | 1 |
| Penn State | | – | | 4 | – | 6 | – | 1 |
| Amherst | | – | | 4 | – | 7 | – | 1 |
| Dartmouth | | – | | 2 | – | 4 | – | 2 |
| NYU | | – | | 3 | – | 6 | – | 1 |
| Tufts | | – | | 3 | – | 6 | – | 1 |
| Wesleyan | | – | | 3 | – | 6 | – | 1 |
| New Hampshire | | – | | 1 | – | 5 | – | 1 |
| Colgate | | – | | 2 | – | 8 | – | 0 |
| CCNY | | – | | 0 | – | 1 | – | 0 |

The 1900 Vermont Green and Gold football team was an American football team that represented the University of Vermont as an independent during the 1900 college football season. In their only year under head coach M. Delmar Ritchie, the team compiled a 4–4–1 record.

== Schedule ==
| Date | Opponent | Site | Result | Source |
|---|---|---|---|---|
| October 10 | Montpelier Seminary | Athletic Park; Burlington, VT | W 16–0 | |
| October 17 | Dartmouth | Athletic Park; Burlington, VT | T 0–0 | |
| October 24 | at Middlebury | Middlebury, VT | W 31–6 | |
| October 27 | Massachusetts | Athletic Park; Burlington, VT | L 5–10 | |
| November 3 | at Union (NY) | Schenectady, NY | L 0–5 | |
| November 10 | Middlebury | Athletic Park; Burlington, VT | W 21–0 | |
| November 14 | Norwich | Athletic Park; Burlington, VT | Canceled | |
| November 17 | at RPI | Troy, NY | W 6–0 | |
| November 20 | at Ogdensburg | Ogdensburg, NY | L 0–20 | |
| November 24 | at Cornell | Percy Field; Ithaca, NY | L 0–42 | |
