= 1900 Cornell Big Red football team =

American college football season

1900 Cornell Big Red football
- Conference: Independent
- Record: 10–2
- Head coach: Percy Haughton (2nd season)
- Captain: Raymond Starbuck
- Home stadium: Percy Field

1900 Eastern college football independents records
	Conf.			Overall
Team	W	L	T	W		L		T
Yale		–		12	–	0	–	0
Penn		–		12	–	1	–	0
Harvard		–		10	–	1	–	0
Cornell		–		10	–	2	–	0
Geneva		–		5	–	1	–	1
Lafayette		–		9	–	2	–	0
Syracuse		–		7	–	2	–	1
Princeton		–		8	–	3	–	0
Drexel		–		5	–	2	–	0
Fordham		–		3	–	1	–	1
Army		–		7	–	3	–	1
Brown		–		7	–	3	–	1
Columbia		–		7	–	3	–	1
Villanova		–		5	–	2	–	2
Washington & Jefferson		–		6	–	3	–	1
Swarthmore		–		6	–	3	–	2
Holy Cross		–		5	–	3	–	1
Carlisle		–		6	–	4	–	1
Buffalo		–		3	–	2	–	2
Western Univ. of Penn		–		5	–	4	–	0
Bucknell		–		4	–	4	–	1
Dickinson		–		5	–	5	–	0
Pittsburgh College		–		3	–	3	–	1
Rutgers		–		4	–	4	–	0
Vermont		–		4	–	4	–	1
Lehigh		–		5	–	6	–	0
Franklin & Marshall		–		4	–	5	–	0
Temple		–		3	–	4	–	1
Penn State		–		4	–	6	–	1
Amherst		–		4	–	7	–	1
Dartmouth		–		2	–	4	–	2
NYU		–		3	–	6	–	1
Tufts		–		3	–	6	–	1
Wesleyan		–		3	–	6	–	1
New Hampshire		–		1	–	5	–	1
Colgate		–		2	–	8	–	0
CCNY		–		0	–	1	–	0

The 1900 Cornell Big Red football team was an American football team that represented Cornell University during the 1900 college football season. In their second season under head coach Percy Haughton, the Big Red compiled a 10–2 record and outscored all opponents by a combined total of 167 to 55. Two Cornell players received honors on the 1900 College Football All-America Team: fullback Raymond Starbuck (Caspar Whitney-1); and tackle Edward R. Alexander (Walter Camp-3).

== Schedule ==
Date	Time	Opponent	Site	Result	Source
September 22		Colgate	Percy Field; Ithaca, NY (rivalry)	W 16–0	
September 29		Syracuse	Percy Field; Ithaca, NY	W 6–0	
October 3		Rochester	Percy Field; Ithaca, NY	W 6–0	
October 6		Bucknell	Percy Field; Ithaca, NY	W 6–0	
October 13		Washington & Jefferson	Percy Field; Ithaca, NY	W 16–5	
October 20		Union (NY)	Percy Field; Ithaca, NY	W 11–0	
October 27		Dartmouth	Percy Field; Ithaca, NY (rivalry)	W 23–6	
November 3	2:45 p.m.	at Princeton	Princeton, NJ	W 12–0	
November 10		Oberlin	Percy Field; Ithaca, NY	W 29–0	
November 17		at Lafayette	March Field; Easton, PA	L 0–17	
November 24		Vermont	Percy Field; Ithaca, NY	W 42–0	
November 29		at Penn	Franklin Field; Philadelphia, PA (rivalry)	L 0–27	
