= 1900 Buffalo football team =

American college football season

1900 Buffalo football
- Conference: Independent
- Record: 3–2–2
- Captain: Charles Hasse
- Home stadium: Buffalo Athletic Field

1900 Eastern college football independents records
	Conf.			Overall
Team	W	L	T	W		L		T
Yale		–		12	–	0	–	0
Penn		–		12	–	1	–	0
Harvard		–		10	–	1	–	0
Cornell		–		10	–	2	–	0
Geneva		–		5	–	1	–	1
Lafayette		–		9	–	2	–	0
Syracuse		–		7	–	2	–	1
Princeton		–		8	–	3	–	0
Drexel		–		5	–	2	–	0
Fordham		–		3	–	1	–	1
Army		–		7	–	3	–	1
Brown		–		7	–	3	–	1
Columbia		–		7	–	3	–	1
Villanova		–		5	–	2	–	2
Washington & Jefferson		–		6	–	3	–	1
Swarthmore		–		6	–	3	–	2
Holy Cross		–		5	–	3	–	1
Carlisle		–		6	–	4	–	1
Buffalo		–		3	–	2	–	2
Western Univ. of Penn		–		5	–	4	–	0
Bucknell		–		4	–	4	–	1
Dickinson		–		5	–	5	–	0
Pittsburgh College		–		3	–	3	–	1
Rutgers		–		4	–	4	–	0
Vermont		–		4	–	4	–	1
Lehigh		–		5	–	6	–	0
Franklin & Marshall		–		4	–	5	–	0
Temple		–		3	–	4	–	1
Penn State		–		4	–	6	–	1
Amherst		–		4	–	7	–	1
Dartmouth		–		2	–	4	–	2
NYU		–		3	–	6	–	1
Tufts		–		3	–	6	–	1
Wesleyan		–		3	–	6	–	1
New Hampshire		–		1	–	5	–	1
Colgate		–		2	–	8	–	0
CCNY		–		0	–	1	–	0

The 1900 Buffalo football team represented the University of Buffalo as an independent during the 1900 college football season. The team had no head coach. Buffalo compiled an overall record of 3–2–2 overall and a mark of 1–1–2 against collegiate foes.

== Schedule ==
Date	Time	Opponent	Site	Result	Attendance	Source
October 6	4:00 p.m.	at Tonawanda YMCA	North Tonawanda, NY	W 6–0		
October 13	3:30 p.m.	Syracuse Athletic Association	Buffalo Athletic Field; Buffalo, NY	W 12–0	200–750	
October 27		at Case	League Park; Cleveland, OH	T 0–0	2,000	
November 2	3:35 p.m.	at Kanaweola Athletic Club	Maple Avenue driving park gridiron; Elmira, NY	L 0–15	1,500	
November 10	3:30 p.m.	Columbia	Buffalo Athletic Field; Buffalo, NY	L 0–17	4,000	
November 17	3:30 p.m.	Western Reserve	Buffalo Athletic Field; Buffalo, NY	T 0–0	300	
November 29	3:45 p.m.	Penn State	Buffalo Athletic Field; Buffalo, NY	W 10–0		
