= 1900 Washington & Jefferson football team =

American college football season

1900 Washington & Jefferson football
- Conference: Independent
- Record: 6–3–1
- Head coach: J. R. Beardsley (1st season)
- Captain: A. L. Phillips
- Home stadium: College Park

1900 Eastern college football independents records
| | Conf. | | | Overall |
| Team | W | L | T | W | | L | | T |
|---|---|---|---|---|---|---|---|---|
| Yale | | – | | 12 | – | 0 | – | 0 |
| Penn | | – | | 12 | – | 1 | – | 0 |
| Harvard | | – | | 10 | – | 1 | – | 0 |
| Cornell | | – | | 10 | – | 2 | – | 0 |
| Geneva | | – | | 5 | – | 1 | – | 1 |
| Lafayette | | – | | 9 | – | 2 | – | 0 |
| Syracuse | | – | | 7 | – | 2 | – | 1 |
| Princeton | | – | | 8 | – | 3 | – | 0 |
| Drexel | | – | | 5 | – | 2 | – | 0 |
| Fordham | | – | | 3 | – | 1 | – | 1 |
| Army | | – | | 7 | – | 3 | – | 1 |
| Brown | | – | | 7 | – | 3 | – | 1 |
| Columbia | | – | | 7 | – | 3 | – | 1 |
| Villanova | | – | | 5 | – | 2 | – | 2 |
| Washington & Jefferson | | – | | 6 | – | 3 | – | 1 |
| Swarthmore | | – | | 6 | – | 3 | – | 2 |
| Holy Cross | | – | | 5 | – | 3 | – | 1 |
| Carlisle | | – | | 6 | – | 4 | – | 1 |
| Buffalo | | – | | 3 | – | 2 | – | 2 |
| Western Univ. of Penn | | – | | 5 | – | 4 | – | 0 |
| Bucknell | | – | | 4 | – | 4 | – | 1 |
| Dickinson | | – | | 5 | – | 5 | – | 0 |
| Pittsburgh College | | – | | 3 | – | 3 | – | 1 |
| Rutgers | | – | | 4 | – | 4 | – | 0 |
| Vermont | | – | | 4 | – | 4 | – | 1 |
| Lehigh | | – | | 5 | – | 6 | – | 0 |
| Franklin & Marshall | | – | | 4 | – | 5 | – | 0 |
| Temple | | – | | 3 | – | 4 | – | 1 |
| Penn State | | – | | 4 | – | 6 | – | 1 |
| Dartmouth | | – | | 2 | – | 4 | – | 2 |
| NYU | | – | | 3 | – | 6 | – | 1 |
| Tufts | | – | | 3 | – | 6 | – | 1 |
| Wesleyan | | – | | 3 | – | 6 | – | 1 |
| New Hampshire | | – | | 1 | – | 5 | – | 1 |
| Colgate | | – | | 2 | – | 8 | – | 0 |
| CCNY | | – | | 0 | – | 1 | – | 0 |

The 1900 Washington & Jefferson football team was an American football team that represented Washington & Jefferson College as an independent during the 1900 college football season. Led by J.R Beardsley in his first and only year as head coach, the team compiled a record of 6–3–1. Beardsley was a graduate of Princeton University and played on the 1899 Princeton Tigers football team.

== Schedule ==
| Date | Time | Opponent | Site | Result | Attendance | Source |
|---|---|---|---|---|---|---|
| September 22 | | Waynesburg | College Park; Washington, PA | W 11–0 | 1,000 | |
| September 29 | | Bethany (WV) | College Park; Washington, PA | W 10–0 | | |
| October 6 | | Westminster (PA) | College Park; Washington, PA | W 16–0 | | |
| October 13 | | at Cornell | Percy Field; Ithaca, NY | L 5–16 | | |
| October 20 | | Western Reserve | College Park; Washington, PA | W 5–0 | | |
| November 3 | 2:45 p.m. | at Navy | Worden Field; Annapolis, MD | L 0–18 | | |
| November 10 | 2:30 p.m. | Ohio | Washington, PA | W 49–0 | | |
| November 17 | | West Virginia | College Park; Washington, PA | W 36-0 | | |
| November 24 | | vs. Carlisle | Exposition Park; Pittsburgh, PA | T 5–5 | | |
| December 1 | | at Duquesne Country and Athletic Club | Exposition Park; Pittsburgh, PA | L 2–10 | 3,000–4,000 | |
