= 1900 Army Cadets football team =

American college football season

1900 Army Cadets football
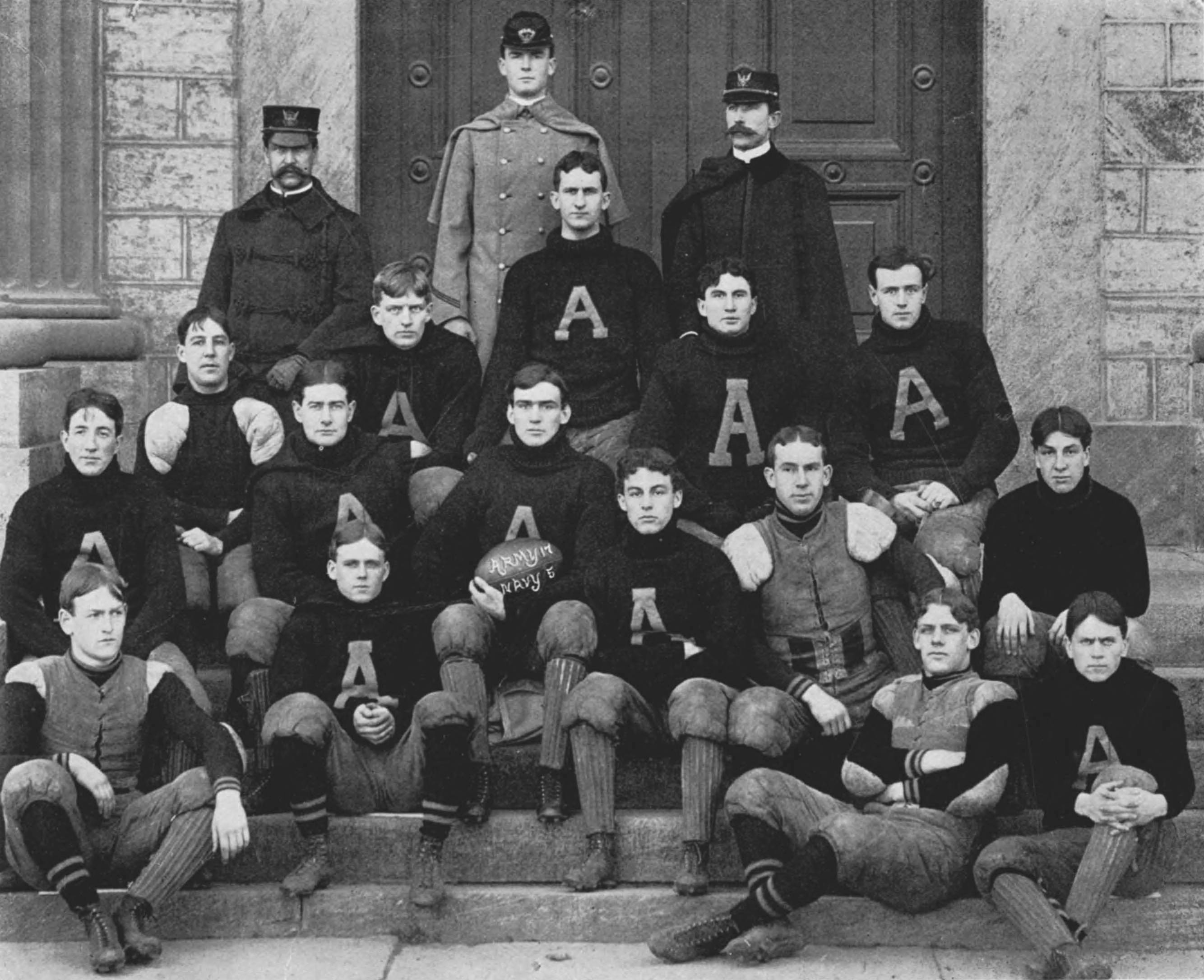
- Conference: Independent
- Record: 7–3–1
- Head coach: Herman Koehler (4th season)
- Captain: Walter Smith
- Home stadium: The Plain

1900 Eastern college football independents records
	Conf.			Overall
Team	W	L	T	W		L		T
Yale		–		12	–	0	–	0
Penn		–		12	–	1	–	0
Harvard		–		10	–	1	–	0
Cornell		–		10	–	2	–	0
Geneva		–		5	–	1	–	1
Lafayette		–		9	–	2	–	0
Syracuse		–		7	–	2	–	1
Princeton		–		8	–	3	–	0
Drexel		–		5	–	2	–	0
Fordham		–		3	–	1	–	1
Army		–		7	–	3	–	1
Brown		–		7	–	3	–	1
Columbia		–		7	–	3	–	1
Villanova		–		5	–	2	–	2
Washington & Jefferson		–		6	–	3	–	1
Swarthmore		–		6	–	3	–	2
Holy Cross		–		5	–	3	–	1
Carlisle		–		6	–	4	–	1
Buffalo		–		3	–	2	–	2
Western Univ. of Penn		–		5	–	4	–	0
Bucknell		–		4	–	4	–	1
Dickinson		–		5	–	5	–	0
Pittsburgh College		–		3	–	3	–	1
Rutgers		–		4	–	4	–	0
Vermont		–		4	–	4	–	1
Lehigh		–		5	–	6	–	0
Franklin & Marshall		–		4	–	5	–	0
Temple		–		3	–	4	–	1
Penn State		–		4	–	6	–	1
Dartmouth		–		2	–	4	–	2
NYU		–		3	–	6	–	1
Tufts		–		3	–	6	–	1
Wesleyan		–		3	–	6	–	1
New Hampshire		–		1	–	5	–	1
Colgate		–		2	–	8	–	0
CCNY		–		0	–	1	–	0

The 1900 Army Cadets football team represented the United States Military Academy as an independent during the 1900 college football season. In their fourth and final season under head coach Herman Koehler, the Cadets compiled a 7–3–1 record, shut out seven opponents (including a scoreless tie with Penn State), and outscored all opponents by a combined total of 109 to 68. The team's three losses came in games against Harvard (29–0), national champion Yale (18–0), and Navy (11–7).

Army end Walter Smith is recognized by the NCAA as a consensus first-team player on the 1900 College Football All-America Team, having received first-team honors from Caspar Whitney and third-team honors from Walter Camp. Tackle Edward Farnsworth also received third-team honors from Camp.

== Schedule ==
Date	Opponent	Site	Result	Attendance	Source
September 29	Tufts	The Plain; West Point, NY	W 5–0		
October 6	Penn State	The Plain; West Point, NY	T 0–0		
October 13	Trinity (CT)	The Plain; West Point, NY	W 28–0		
October 17	De La Salle Institute (NY)	The Plain; West Point, NY	W 11–0		
October 20	Harvard	The Plain; West Point, NY	L 0–29	5,000	
October 27	Williams	The Plain; West Point, NY	W 6–0		
November 3	Yale	The Plain; West Point, NY	L 0–18		
November 7	Rutgers	The Plain; West Point, NY	W 23–0		
November 10	Hamilton	The Plain; West Point, NY	W 11–0		
November 17	Bucknell	The Plain; West Point, NY	W 18–10		
December 1	vs. Navy	Franklin Field; Philadelphia, PA (Army–Navy Game)	L 7–11		
