= 1900 NYU Violets football team =

American college football season

1900 NYU Violets football
- Conference: Independent
- Record: 3–6–1
- Head coach: Nelson B. Hatch (1st season)
- Home stadium: Ohio Field

1900 Eastern college football independents records
| | Conf. | | | Overall |
| Team | W | L | T | W | | L | | T |
|---|---|---|---|---|---|---|---|---|
| Yale | | – | | 12 | – | 0 | – | 0 |
| Penn | | – | | 12 | – | 1 | – | 0 |
| Harvard | | – | | 10 | – | 1 | – | 0 |
| Cornell | | – | | 10 | – | 2 | – | 0 |
| Geneva | | – | | 5 | – | 1 | – | 1 |
| Lafayette | | – | | 9 | – | 2 | – | 0 |
| Syracuse | | – | | 7 | – | 2 | – | 1 |
| Princeton | | – | | 8 | – | 3 | – | 0 |
| Drexel | | – | | 5 | – | 2 | – | 0 |
| Fordham | | – | | 3 | – | 1 | – | 1 |
| Army | | – | | 7 | – | 3 | – | 1 |
| Brown | | – | | 7 | – | 3 | – | 1 |
| Columbia | | – | | 7 | – | 3 | – | 1 |
| Villanova | | – | | 5 | – | 2 | – | 2 |
| Washington & Jefferson | | – | | 6 | – | 3 | – | 1 |
| Swarthmore | | – | | 6 | – | 3 | – | 2 |
| Holy Cross | | – | | 5 | – | 3 | – | 1 |
| Carlisle | | – | | 6 | – | 4 | – | 1 |
| Buffalo | | – | | 3 | – | 2 | – | 2 |
| Western Univ. of Penn | | – | | 5 | – | 4 | – | 0 |
| Bucknell | | – | | 4 | – | 4 | – | 1 |
| Dickinson | | – | | 5 | – | 5 | – | 0 |
| Pittsburgh College | | – | | 3 | – | 3 | – | 1 |
| Rutgers | | – | | 4 | – | 4 | – | 0 |
| Vermont | | – | | 4 | – | 4 | – | 1 |
| Lehigh | | – | | 5 | – | 6 | – | 0 |
| Franklin & Marshall | | – | | 4 | – | 5 | – | 0 |
| Temple | | – | | 3 | – | 4 | – | 1 |
| Penn State | | – | | 4 | – | 6 | – | 1 |
| Amherst | | – | | 4 | – | 7 | – | 1 |
| Dartmouth | | – | | 2 | – | 4 | – | 2 |
| NYU | | – | | 3 | – | 6 | – | 1 |
| Tufts | | – | | 3 | – | 6 | – | 1 |
| Wesleyan | | – | | 3 | – | 6 | – | 1 |
| New Hampshire | | – | | 1 | – | 5 | – | 1 |
| Colgate | | – | | 2 | – | 8 | – | 0 |
| CCNY | | – | | 0 | – | 1 | – | 0 |

The 1900 NYU Violets football team was an American football team that represented New York University as an independent during the 1900 college football season. In their only year under head coach Nelson B. Hatch, the team compiled a 3–6–1 record.

== Schedule ==
| Date | Opponent | Site | Result | Source |
|---|---|---|---|---|
| October 6 | NYU alumni | Ohio Field; Bronx, NY | T 0–0 | |
| October 9 | at Stevens | Hoboken, NJ | W 11–0 | |
| October 13 | at Syracuse | Syracuse, NY | L 0–12 | |
| October 20 | St. Stephen's | Ohio Field; Bronx, NY | W 17–0 | |
| October 24 | Brooklyn Poly | Ohio Field; Bronx, NY | W 55–0 | |
| October 31 | at Army 2nd team | The Plain; West Point, NY | L 0–6 | |
| November 3 | at RPI | Troy, NY | L 2–16 | |
| November 10 | at Trinity (CT) | Trinity Field; Hartford, CT | L 0–22 | |
| November 16 | Rutgers | Ohio Field; Bronx, NY | L 0–11 | |
| November 24 | Hamilton | Ohio Field; Bronx, NY | L 0–39 | |
