= 1900 Western University of Pennsylvania football team =

American college football season

1900 Western University of Pennsylvania football
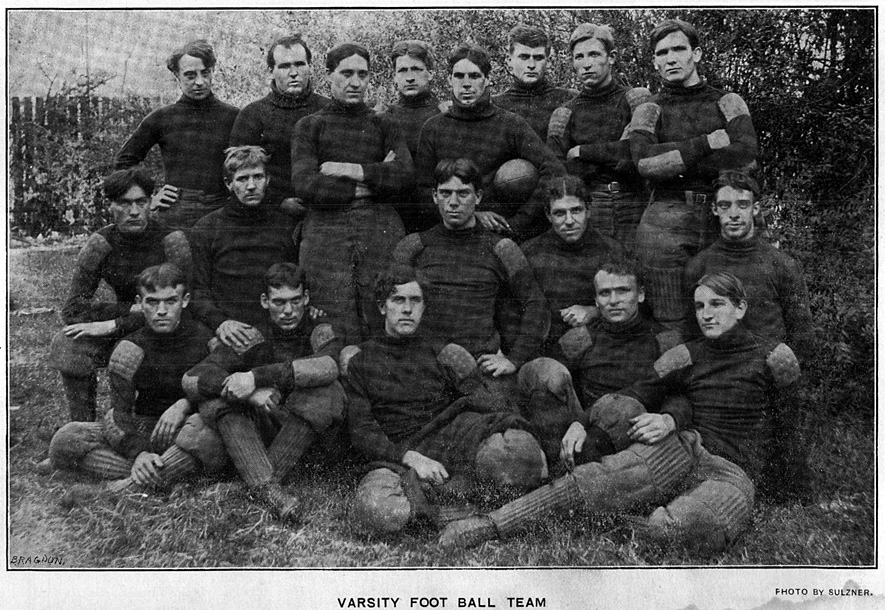
- Conference: Independent
- Record: 5–4
- Head coach: Roy Jackson (1st season)
- Home stadium: Exposition Park

1900 Eastern college football independents records
	Conf.			Overall
Team	W	L	T	W		L		T
Yale		–		12	–	0	–	0
Penn		–		12	–	1	–	0
Harvard		–		10	–	1	–	0
Cornell		–		10	–	2	–	0
Geneva		–		5	–	1	–	1
Lafayette		–		9	–	2	–	0
Syracuse		–		7	–	2	–	1
Princeton		–		8	–	3	–	0
Drexel		–		5	–	2	–	0
Fordham		–		3	–	1	–	1
Army		–		7	–	3	–	1
Brown		–		7	–	3	–	1
Columbia		–		7	–	3	–	1
Villanova		–		5	–	2	–	2
Washington & Jefferson		–		6	–	3	–	1
Swarthmore		–		6	–	3	–	2
Holy Cross		–		5	–	3	–	1
Carlisle		–		6	–	4	–	1
Buffalo		–		3	–	2	–	2
Western Univ. of Penn		–		5	–	4	–	0
Bucknell		–		4	–	4	–	1
Dickinson		–		5	–	5	–	0
Pittsburgh College		–		3	–	3	–	1
Rutgers		–		4	–	4	–	0
Vermont		–		4	–	4	–	1
Lehigh		–		5	–	6	–	0
Franklin & Marshall		–		4	–	5	–	0
Temple		–		3	–	4	–	1
Penn State		–		4	–	6	–	1
Dartmouth		–		2	–	4	–	2
NYU		–		3	–	6	–	1
Tufts		–		3	–	6	–	1
Wesleyan		–		3	–	6	–	1
New Hampshire		–		1	–	5	–	1
Colgate		–		2	–	8	–	0
CCNY		–		0	–	1	–	0

The 1900 Western University of Pennsylvania football team was an American football team that represented Western University of Pennsylvania (now known as the University of Pittsburgh) as an independent during the 1900 college football season.

== Schedule ==
Date	Opponent	Site	Result	Attendance	Source
September 29	at Penn State	Bellefonte, PA (rivalry)	L 0–12	1,000	
October 6	at West Virginia	Morgantown, WV (rivalry)	L 5–6		
October 9	Duquesne Country and Athletic Club	Exposition Park; Pittsburgh, PA	L 0–5	400	
October 19	Grove City	Exposition Park; Pittsburgh, PA	W 12–0	200	
October 24	at California State Normal (PA)	California, PA	W 12–0		
October 27	at Buchtel	Akron, OH	W 17–0		
November 1	Thiel	Exposition Park; Pittsburgh, PA	W 47–0		
November 14	Westminster (PA)	Exposition Park; Pittsburgh, PA	W 17–5	600	
November 21	Shady Side Academy	Exposition Park; Pittsburgh, PA	L 0–5		

== Season recap ==
With regards to football coaching in 1900, W.U.P. revamped its coaching system. On July 15, The Pittsburg Post indicated that Dr. Roy Jackson would be the team coach. Three days later, Pittsburgh Press elaborated that Jackson would act as coach and a player for the team from Duquesne Country and Athletic Club (D.C. & A.C.), while he would provide coaching to W.U.P., depending on his time. In this regard, W.U.P. practiced together with the team from D.C. & A.C.. The practices started on September 3rd with all the candidates eligible to become part of the varsity team as there was no second team for the sophomores. Only the lettermen could wear the "P" badge. During the matches, the team played under the leadership of the captain named Richard Wallace. Over the season coached by Roy Jackson, the team had achieved 5 wins and 4 losses with a score of 110 to 33 against its opponents.

== Game summaries ==
=== At Penn State ===
WUP at Penn State

Team	1	2	Total
WUP	0	0	0
• Penn State	6	6	12

- Date: September 29, 1900
- Location: Driving Park Grounds, Bellefonte, PA
- Game attendance: 1000
- Referee: C. E. Aull (Pittsburgh)

On a rainy Saturday, the 29th of September, the Western University of Pennsylvania football team opened their season at the Driving Park grounds in Bellefonte, Pennsylvania, against the State College eleven. In the first half (20 minutes), the WUP contingent held their own against the heavier Staties. After 15 minutes of back-and-forth possessions dominated by line plunges, fullback Cummings of State College managed to score a touchdown. Martin was successful on the goal kick after, and the score at halftime was 6–0 in favor of State College. In the second half (15 minutes), the WUP offense managed to advance the ball to the five-yard line of State College but could get no closer. The State defense held and punted the ball out of danger. After an exchange of possessions and WUP fumbles, the Staties offense found themselves on the WUP 10-yard line. Two plays later, State guard Scholl scored. Martin was again successful with the goal kick after and the final score was a respectable 12–0. Coach Jackson was impressed with the play of his charges. Penn State finished the season with a 4–6–1 record.

The WUP lineup for the game against Penn State was John Miller (left end), Richard Wallace (left tackle), Wilbur Hockensmith (left guard), Emil Fryer (center), William Sterrett (right guard), John Martin (right tackle), Herman Blevins (right end), William Cullers (quarterback), William Hansen (left halfback), Earl Paul (right halfback) and Charles Cook (fullback). James Chessrown replaced Emil Fryer at center.

=== At West Virginia ===
WUP at West Virginia

Team	1	2	Total
WUP	5	0	5
• West Virginia	6	0	6

- Date: October 6, 1900
- Location: University Grounds, Morgantown, WV
- Referee: Bohner

The WUP team spent the week scrimmaging against D.C. & A.C. in preparation for their trip to Morgantown, West Virginia. Starting back Earl Paul and lineman James Chessrown were nursing injuries from the State College game and D.C. & A.C. scrimmage, but Parke Bachman and Herman Blevins were able replacements. The team boarded the steamer Edgar Cherry on 2:30 p.m. Friday afternoon and arrived in Morgantown on Saturday morning at 11 a.m. The arduous 20 plus hour trip did not leave the WUP squad adequately rested. The Mountaineers kicked off and WUP fullback Edmund Graham returned the ball to the 40-yard line and fumbled. West Virginia recovered and advanced the ball offensively. Their end McGregor ultimately scored the touchdown. The goal after was successful and the score was 6–0 in favor of West Virginia less than five minutes into the game. The WUP kicked off and their defense was able to secure the ball on downs. The WUP offense used a "guards back" formation and methodically penetrated the West Virginia defense. Captain Richard Wallace was able to score four minutes prior to halftime. Wheeler missed the goal kick after and West Virginia led 6–5 at halftime. This game also consisted of a 20-minute first half and a 15-minute second half. The second half was a defensive battle. The WUP kicked off and the Mountaineer offense was stymied. The Mountaineers punted and the WUP offense slowly advanced the ball to the West Virginia 15-yard line. Here the Mountaineer defense stiffened and the Western U. turned the ball over on downs. The game ended moments later. The Mountaineers finished the season with a 4–3 record. The WUP lineup for the West Virginia game was Wheeler (left end), Richard Wallace (left tackle), Wilbur Hockensmith (left guard), Parke Bachman (center), William Sterrett (right guard), John Martin (right tackle), Clyde Sample (right end), William Cullers (quarterback), Herman Blevins (left halfback), William Hansen (right halfback) and Edmund Graham (fullback). Earl Paul replaced Herman Bevins at left halfback.

=== Duquesne Country and Athletic Club ===
WUP at D. C. & A. C.

Team	1	2	Total
WUP	0	0	0
• D. C. & A. C.	5	0	5

- Date: October 9, 1900
- Location: Exposition Park, Pittsburgh
- Game attendance: 400
- Referee: Sample (WUP)

On Tuesday, October 9, the WUP eleven played a game against the team (D.C. & A.C.) it had been practicing against for the past two weeks. Also, they were playing against their own coach (Dr. Roy Jackson), who played left halfback for the Duquesnes in addition to coaching them. The University eleven fooled the experts and played a strong game against the heavier more experienced "pro" team. The Duquesnes scored on a line plunge by their guard Smith in the first half. The goal kick after was unsuccessful and the score stood 5–0 in favor of D.C. & A.C. There was no scoring in the second half as the Duquesnes were able to move the ball against the Universities but would fumble and the WUP would recover. The University eleven could not move the ball consistently on offense even though, they changed their normal signals to confuse Coach Jackson. WUP fullback Edmund Graham was kept busy punting the ball out of danger. The Western U. team gained a lot of confidence for their next game against Grove City College. The WUP lineup for the game against the Duquesnes was Wheeler (left end), Richard Wallace (left tackle), Wilbur Hockensmith (left guard), James Chessrown (center), Herman Watt (right guard), Parke Bachman (right tackle), John Martin (right end), William Cullers (quarterback), Earl Paul (right halfback), William Hansen (left halfback) and Edmund Graham (fullback). William Sterrett replaced Richard Wallace at left tackle. The game consisted of one twenty minute half and one fifteen minute half.

=== Grove City ===
Grove City at WUP

Team	1	2	Total
Grove City	0	0	0
• WUP	6	6	12

- Date: October 19, 1900
- Location: Exposition Park, Pittsburgh
- Referee: S. Gardner (Grove City)

On October 19, the Grove City College eleven came to Exposition Park to take on the WUP. Pregame drama arose when Western U. captain Wallace argued that Grove City coach Lowrey was a professional and should not be in the lineup. Grove City countered that since the WUP squad had played a game against the D.C.& A.C. their argument was moot. Coach Lowrey played. On the opening drive, the WUP backs were able to move the ball steadily downfield. Finally, halfback Beach scored the touchdown on a five yard dash around the end. Wheeler kicked the goal after and the Western U. lads led 6–0. For the remainder of the first half, the teams alternated possessions and fumbled away opportunities. The WUP defense did not allow Grove City to penetrate their side of the field in the second half. Offensively, the WUP offense had one sustained drive that ended with Wilbur Hockensmith plunging over from the three for their second touchdown. William Sterrett kicked the goal after and the game ended 12–0 in favor of the University eleven. The WUP lineup for the game against Grove City was Wheeler (left end), John Martin (left tackle), Wilbur Hockensmith (left guard), James Chessrown (center), William Sterrett (right guard), Parke Bachman (right tackle), Victor King (right end), William Cullers (quarterback), Beach (left halfback), William Hansen (right halfback) and Edmund Graham (fullback). The substitutions made during the game were: G. A. Jelly replaced Victor King at right end; Earl Paul replaced William Hansen at right halfback; Jacob Benner replaced G. A. Jelly at right end; and Richard Wallace replaced Jacob Benner at right end. The game was played in 15-minute halves.

=== At California State Normal (PA) ===
WUP at California Normal

Team	1	2	Total
• WUP	12	0	12
California Normal	0	0	0

- Date: October 24, 1900
- Location: California Grounds, California, PA

On October 24, the Western University squad traveled to California, Pennsylvania, to play the football team of the California Normal School. The WUP was in control throughout this game and leading 12–0 with 10 minutes to play in the second half when the officials mercifully ended the game. The hard physical play had injured too many of the California players. The WUP lineup for the game against California Normal was Wheeler (left end), Emil Fryer (left tackle), Wilbur Hockensmith (left guard), James Chessrown (center), William Sterrett (right guard), John Martin (right tackle), G. A. Jelly (right end), William Cullers (quarterback), William Hansen (left halfback), Earl Paul (right halfback) and Edmund Graham (fullback).

=== At Buchtel ===
WUP at Buchtel

Team	1	2	Total
• WUP	17	0	17
Buchtel	0	0	0

- Date: October 27, 1900
- Location: Buchtel Grounds, Akron, Ohio
- Referee: Whitsel (Akron)

On October 27 the WUP team resumed its physical style of football in Akron, Ohio against Buchtel College. The 25-minute first half lasted an hour and fifteen minutes due to many injury timeouts. Consequently, the second half was reduced to 10 minutes of play. Both teams were able to move the ball. Buchtel got near the WUP goal line three times but were thwarted by the WUP defense each time. In the rugged first half, Washer attempted a field goal for the Normals but the WUP defense blocked it. End Abram Barclay picked it up and raced 96 yards for the WUP touchdown. The WUP offense was able to methodically advance the ball in the second half, with End Wheeler and fullback Edmund Graham both scoring touchdowns. The final score was 17–0 in favor of the visitors. The WUP lineup for the game against Buchtel was Wheeler (left end), Richard Wallace (left tackle), Wilbur Hockensmith (left guard), James Chessrown (center), William Sterrett (right guard), Emil Fryer (right tackle), Abram Barclay (right end), William Cullers (quarterback), William Hansen (left halfback), Beach (right halfback) and Edmund Graham (fullback). The substitutions made during the game were: John Martin replaced Wheeler at left end and Wheeler replaced Beach at right halfback.

=== Thiel ===
Thiel at WUP

Team	1	2	Total
Thiel	0	0	0
• WUP	29	18	47

- Date: November 1, 1900
- Location: Exposition Park, Pittsburgh
- Referee: Judd Bruff (D. C. & A.C.)

On November 1, the Thiel College football team came south from Greenville, Pennsylvania, to Exposition Park to battle the WUP. There was some concern with the University lineup because the Buchtel game was so physical. Starters Barclay, Paul, Graham and captain Wallace were all injured so the lineup had to be adjusted. The concern turned out to be unfounded as the WUP contingent ran roughshod over the Thiel eleven and won the game by a 47–0 margin. Five different WUP players scored touchdowns – Hockensmith (2), Martin (2), Beach (2), Sterrett and Wheeler. Martin made the longest run of the game on his 43-yard touchdown jaunt. Thiel only had the ball four times on offense and was unable to sustain any offense. However, Thiel never gave up and played hard to the bitter end. The WUP offense advanced the ball easily and lost it once on downs and once on a fumble. The large crowd of noisy students and bands helped make the day a total success. The WUP lineup for the game against Thiel was John Martin (left end), Parke Bachman (left tackle), Wilbur Hockensmith (left guard), James Chessrown (center), William Sterrett (right guard), Emil Fryer (right tackle), Paul McClain (right end), William Cullers (quarterback), William Hansen (right halfback), Beach (left halfback) and Wheeler (fullback). The substitutions made during the game were: Herman Watt replaced Parke Bachman at left tackle; William Mitchell replaced Freyer at right tackle; and G. A. Jelly replaced Paul McClain at right end. The game consisted of one twenty-five minute half and one twenty minute half.

=== Westminster (PA) ===
Westminster at WUP

Team	1	2	Total
Westminster	5	0	5
• WUP	5	12	17

- Date: November 14, 1900
- Location: Exposition Park, Pittsburgh
- Referee: Captain Jackson (D. C. & A. C.)

With the WUP football team sporting a three game win streak, the student body was anxiously awaiting the November 14 tussle with Westminster College at Exposition Park. Both the Dental and Medical Departments arrived with a brass band. The Collegiate Department was also well represented. Both teams agreed to pregame measures to avoid any dispute similar to the 1899 game. The WUP fans were schooled on the proper behavior to ensure a great game of football. So, with at least six hundred noise making students in attendance, there was total silence when Westminster had the ball on offense. No fans were allowed on the field during the game. The guaranteed fifty per cent gate receipt was paid two days before the game. Surprisingly, the day before the game Westminster decided they wanted sixty percent of the receipts . Manager William Cullers reluctantly agreed so the game could be played. The WUP offense received the opening kick on their twenty-five yard line and moved it to the thirty-five before turning it over on downs to the Titans. Witherspoon and Edmundson of Westminster were able to penetrate the WUP defense for good yardage and Edmundson finally scored from the one. The goal kick after was unsuccessful. After alternating possessions the WUP offense moved the ball to the Westminster six yard line and lost the ball on downs. A holding penalty gave the ball back to the WUP offense but William Sterrett missed a field goal. The WUP defense regained possession and the offense advanced the ball steadily downfield. Abram Barclay raced the final twenty yards for the touchdown. Wheeler's goal kick after was unsuccessful and the score was tied 5–5 at halftime. The WUP eleven controlled the second half of play to the delight of the crowd. On their first possession they secured the ball in Westminster territory and drove the ball twenty yards for the go ahead touchdown. William Sterrett plunged into the end zone from the one. Wheeler was successful on the goal kick after and the WUPs led 11–5. After a change of possessions Westminster missed a field goal and the WUP offense sustained another time consuming drive that ended with William Sterrett plunging over the goal from the two yard line. Wheeler was again successful with the goal kick after and the score was 17–5 in favor of the WUP. Captain Richard Wallace then gave the following substitutes game experience: Malcolm McConnell, Herman Watt, Parke Bachman, and Paul McClain. The WUP starting lineup for the game against Westminster was Wheeler (left end), Richard Wallace (left tackle), Wilbur Hockensmith (left guard), James Chessrown (center), William Sterrett (right guard), John Martin (right tackle), Abram Barclay (right end), William Cullers (quarterback), William Hansen (left halfback), Earl Paul (right halfback) and Wheeler (fullback). The game consisted of one twenty-five minute half and one twenty minute half.

=== Shadyside Academy ===
Shadyside Academy at WUP

Team	1	2	Total
• Shadyside	5	0	5
WUP	0	0	0

- Date: November 21, 1900
- Location: Exposition Park, Pittsburgh
- Referee: Charles Aull

On November 21, the four-game WUP win streak came to an abrupt end at the hands of the outweighed Shady Side Academy eleven at Exposition Park. In the first minutes, the WUP defense held the Shady Side offense and gained possession on their twenty-five yard line. The WUP offense gained five yards but on second down Hockensmith fumbled. Halfback Ahl of the Academy picked up the loose ball and raced for a touchdown. Bauersmith missed the goal kick after. The closest the WUP offense could get to scoring in the first half was the four yard line, but the staunch Academy defense kept them from scoring. The second half was a defensive struggle and the WUP offense could get no closer than the Academy twenty-three yard line. Shady Side drove the ball to the WUP three late in the game but were kept out of the end zone by the Western U. defense. The game ended 5–0 in favor of Shady Side. The starting lineup for the game against Shady Side Academy was John Martin (left end), Richard Wallace (left tackle), Wilbur Hockensmith (left guard), James Chessrown (center), William Sterrett (right guard), Herman Watt (right tackle), Abram Barclay (right end), William Cullers (quarterback), Beach (left halfback), Earl Paul (right halfback) and Wheeler (fullback). The substitutions made during the game were: Malcolm McConnell for William Cullers at quarterback and Emil Fryer for Wilbur Hockensmith at left guard. The game was played in 25-minute halves.

== Scoring summary ==
1900 Western University of Pennsylvania scoring summary
Player	Touchdowns	Extra points	Points
Wheeler	2	12	22
William Sterrett	3	1	16
Wilbur Hockensmith	3	0	15
Beach	3	0	15
Abram Barclay	2	0	10
John Martin	2	0	10
Richard Wallace	1	0	5
Edmund Graham	1	0	5
Unknown	2	2	12
Totals	19	15	110

== Roster ==
The roster of the 1900 Western University of Pennsylvania football team:

First Lettermen:

- James H. Chessrown (center) earned his Doctor of Dental Surgery degree in 1901 and resided in Youngstown, Ohio.
- Wilbur D. Hockensmith (guard) graduated with a degree in electrical engineering in 1901 and resided in Pittsburgh, Pa. He served as WUP football coach for the 1901 season.
- William J. Sterrett (guard) earned his Doctor of Medicine degree in 1901 and resided in East Pittsburgh, Pa.
- Herman E. Watt (guard) graduated with a degree in mechanical engineering in 1901. He resided in Huntington, West Virginia.
- Dr. John L. Martin (tackle) received his Doctor of Medicine degree in 1903 and resided in Pittsburgh.
- John A W. Miller (end) earned his degree in mechanical engineering in 1901. He resided in Ford City, Pa.
- Abram C. Barclay (end) earned his Doctor of Dental Surgery degree in 1903. He resided in Edgewood Park, Pa.
- William K. W. Hansen (halfback) earned his degree in mechanical engineering in 1901. He resided in Penn Station, Pa.
- Earl W. Paul (halfback) earned his electrical engineering degree in 1901 and resided in Upland, Calif.
- Parke R. Bachman (center) received his associate engineering degree in 1901. He became the Superintendent of the Sharon Steel Hoop Company in Sharon, Pa.
- Malcolm F. McConnell (quarterback) earned his mechanical engineering degree in 1902. He resided in Steubenville, Ohio and worked for the Carnegie Steel Company.
- G.A. Jelly (end) was enrolled in the dental school for the 1899-1900 school year.

Remaining roster:

- Jacob W. Benner (end) earned his degree in mechanical engineering in 1901 and resided in Munhall, Pa.
- Dr. Victor King (end) earned his Doctor of Medicine degree in 1901 and resided in Pittsburgh.
- Herman G. Blevins (end) earned his associate engineering degree in 1901 and resided in Youngstown, Ohio.
- Edmund H. Graham (fullback) earned his Doctor of Medicine degree in 1901. He resided in Stahlstown, Pa.
- Dr. Paul J. McClain (end) earned his Doctor of Medicine degree in 1903 and resided in Oil City, Pa.
- William Mitchell (tackle) earned his degree in mechanical engineering in 1901 and resided in Niagara Falls, N.Y.
- Walter H. Eisenbeis (substitute) earned his electrical engineering degree in 1902 and resided in Pittsburgh.
- George F. Turner (substitute) earned his civil engineering degree in 1903. He resided in Youngstown, Ohio.
- Charles Cook (substitute) earned his Doctor of Medicine degree 1901.
- Clyde Sample (end) earned his associate degree from the college in 1901 and resided in Wilkinsburg, Pa.
- Emil Fryer (tackle) earned his Doctor of Dental Surgery degree in 1901.
- Beach (halfback)
- Wheeler (end)

== Coaching staff ==
- Roy Jackson was the coach for the 1900 season. He played his college ball at the University of Pennsylvania. While coaching the WUPs, he also coached and played for the Duquesne Country and Athletic Club
- William H. Cullers (manager/quarterback) graduated in 1901 with a degree in civil engineering. He resided in Portland, Oregon.
- Richard W. Wallace (captain/tackle) graduated with a degree in electrical engineering in 1902 and resided in Millvale, Pa.
