= 1900 Syracuse Orangemen football team =

American college football season

1900 Syracuse Orangemen football
- Conference: Independent
- Record: 7–2–1
- Head coach: Edwin Sweetland (1st season)
- Captain: Haden Patten
- Home stadium: Old Oval

1900 Eastern college football independents records
	Conf.			Overall
Team	W	L	T	W		L		T
Yale		–		12	–	0	–	0
Penn		–		12	–	1	–	0
Harvard		–		10	–	1	–	0
Cornell		–		10	–	2	–	0
Geneva		–		5	–	1	–	1
Lafayette		–		9	–	2	–	0
Syracuse		–		7	–	2	–	1
Princeton		–		8	–	3	–	0
Drexel		–		5	–	2	–	0
Fordham		–		3	–	1	–	1
Army		–		7	–	3	–	1
Brown		–		7	–	3	–	1
Columbia		–		7	–	3	–	1
Villanova		–		5	–	2	–	2
Washington & Jefferson		–		6	–	3	–	1
Swarthmore		–		6	–	3	–	2
Holy Cross		–		5	–	3	–	1
Carlisle		–		6	–	4	–	1
Buffalo		–		3	–	2	–	2
Western Univ. of Penn		–		5	–	4	–	0
Bucknell		–		4	–	4	–	1
Dickinson		–		5	–	5	–	0
Pittsburgh College		–		3	–	3	–	1
Rutgers		–		4	–	4	–	0
Vermont		–		4	–	4	–	1
Lehigh		–		5	–	6	–	0
Franklin & Marshall		–		4	–	5	–	0
Temple		–		3	–	4	–	1
Penn State		–		4	–	6	–	1
Dartmouth		–		2	–	4	–	2
NYU		–		3	–	6	–	1
Tufts		–		3	–	6	–	1
Wesleyan		–		3	–	6	–	1
New Hampshire		–		1	–	5	–	1
Colgate		–		2	–	8	–	0
CCNY		–		0	–	1	–	0

The 1900 Syracuse Orangemen football team represented Syracuse University as an independent during the 1900 college football season. The head coach was Edwin Sweetland, coaching his first season with the Orangemen.

== Schedule ==
Date	Time	Opponent	Site	Result	Attendance	Source
September 22		Cortland	Syracuse, NY	W 35–0		
September 29		at Cornell	Percy Field; Ithaca, NY	L 0–6		
October 6		St. Lawrence	Syracuse, NY	W 70–0		
October 13		NYU	Syracuse, NY	W 12–0		
October 17		at Princeton	Osborne Field; Princeton, NJ	L 0–43		
October 20	2:00 p.m.	Amherst	University Oval; Syracuse, NY	W 5–0	1,200	
November 3		at Oberlin	Oberlin, OH	W 6–0		
November 10		Dickinson	Syracuse, NY	W 6–0		
November 17		Rochester	Syracuse, NY	W 68–5		
November 24		at Brown	Andrews Field; Providence, RI	T 6–6		
