= 1900 Penn State football team =

American college football season

1900 Penn State football
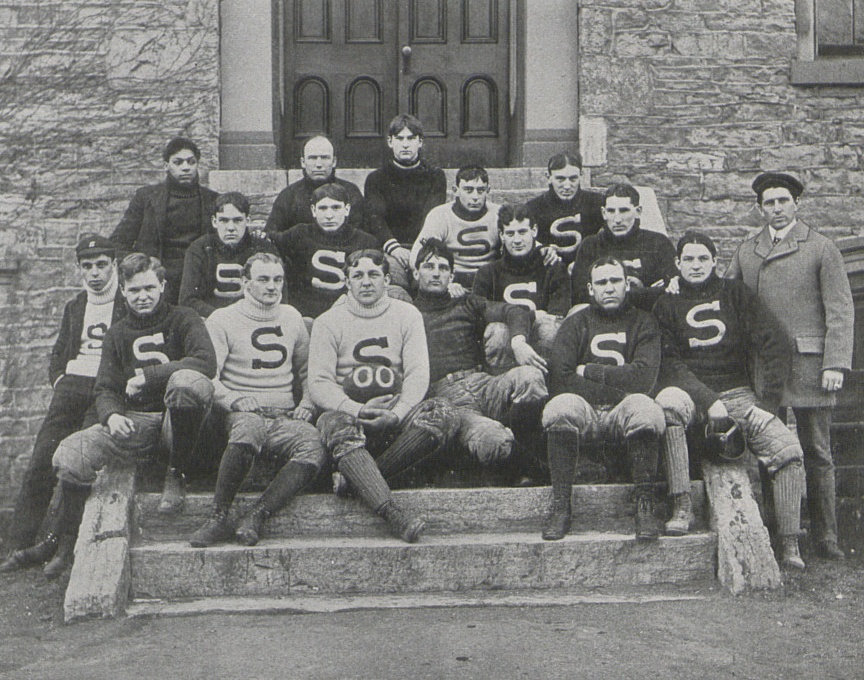
- Conference: Independent
- Record: 4–6–1
- Head coach: Pop Golden (1st season)
- Captain: Henny Scholl
- Home stadium: Beaver Field

1900 Eastern college football independents records
	Conf.			Overall
Team	W	L	T	W		L		T
Yale		–		12	–	0	–	0
Penn		–		12	–	1	–	0
Harvard		–		10	–	1	–	0
Cornell		–		10	–	2	–	0
Geneva		–		5	–	1	–	1
Lafayette		–		9	–	2	–	0
Syracuse		–		7	–	2	–	1
Princeton		–		8	–	3	–	0
Drexel		–		5	–	2	–	0
Fordham		–		3	–	1	–	1
Army		–		7	–	3	–	1
Brown		–		7	–	3	–	1
Columbia		–		7	–	3	–	1
Villanova		–		5	–	2	–	2
Washington & Jefferson		–		6	–	3	–	1
Swarthmore		–		6	–	3	–	2
Holy Cross		–		5	–	3	–	1
Carlisle		–		6	–	4	–	1
Buffalo		–		3	–	2	–	2
Western Univ. of Penn		–		5	–	4	–	0
Bucknell		–		4	–	4	–	1
Dickinson		–		5	–	5	–	0
Pittsburgh College		–		3	–	3	–	1
Rutgers		–		4	–	4	–	0
Vermont		–		4	–	4	–	1
Lehigh		–		5	–	6	–	0
Franklin & Marshall		–		4	–	5	–	0
Temple		–		3	–	4	–	1
Penn State		–		4	–	6	–	1
Dartmouth		–		2	–	4	–	2
NYU		–		3	–	6	–	1
Tufts		–		3	–	6	–	1
Wesleyan		–		3	–	6	–	1
New Hampshire		–		1	–	5	–	1
Colgate		–		2	–	8	–	0
CCNY		–		0	–	1	–	0

The 1900 Penn State football team was an American football team that represented Pennsylvania State College—now known as Pennsylvania State University–as an independent during the 1900 college football season. The team was coached by Pop Golden and played its home games in Beaver Field in State College, Pennsylvania.

== Schedule ==
Date	Time	Opponent	Site	Result	Attendance	Source
September 23		Susquehanna	Beaver Field; State College, PA	W 17–0		
September 29		vs. Western University of Pennsylvania	Bellefonte, PA (rivalry)	W 12–0	1,000	
October 6		at Army	The Plain; West Point, NY	T 0–0		
October 10		at Princeton	Osborne Field; Princeton, NJ	L 0–26		
October 17		at Penn	Franklin Field; Philadelphia, PA	L 5–17	1,500	
October 20		at Dickinson	Carlisle, PA	L 0–18		
October 27		at Duquesne Country and Athletic Club	Exposition Park; Allegheny, PA	L 0–29	1,500	
November 3		vs. Bucknell	Williamsport, PA	W 6–0		
November 10		at Navy	Worden Field; Annapolis, MD	L 0–44		
November 17		Gettysburg	Beaver Field; State College, PA	W 44–0		
November 29	3:45 p.m.	at Buffalo	Buffalo Athletic Field; Buffalo, NY	L 0–10		
