= 1900 Pittsburgh College football team =

American college football season

1900 Pittsburgh College football
- Conference: Independent
- Record: 3–3–1
- Captain: J. J. Laux

1900 Eastern college football independents records
	Conf.			Overall
Team	W	L	T	W		L		T
Yale		–		12	–	0	–	0
Penn		–		12	–	1	–	0
Harvard		–		10	–	1	–	0
Cornell		–		10	–	2	–	0
Geneva		–		5	–	1	–	1
Lafayette		–		9	–	2	–	0
Syracuse		–		7	–	2	–	1
Princeton		–		8	–	3	–	0
Drexel		–		5	–	2	–	0
Fordham		–		3	–	1	–	1
Army		–		7	–	3	–	1
Brown		–		7	–	3	–	1
Columbia		–		7	–	3	–	1
Villanova		–		5	–	2	–	2
Washington & Jefferson		–		6	–	3	–	1
Swarthmore		–		6	–	3	–	2
Holy Cross		–		5	–	3	–	1
Carlisle		–		6	–	4	–	1
Buffalo		–		3	–	2	–	2
Western Univ. of Penn		–		5	–	4	–	0
Bucknell		–		4	–	4	–	1
Dickinson		–		5	–	5	–	0
Pittsburgh College		–		3	–	3	–	1
Rutgers		–		4	–	4	–	0
Vermont		–		4	–	4	–	1
Lehigh		–		5	–	6	–	0
Franklin & Marshall		–		4	–	5	–	0
Temple		–		3	–	4	–	1
Penn State		–		4	–	6	–	1
Amherst		–		4	–	7	–	1
Dartmouth		–		2	–	4	–	2
NYU		–		3	–	6	–	1
Tufts		–		3	–	6	–	1
Wesleyan		–		3	–	6	–	1
New Hampshire		–		1	–	5	–	1
Colgate		–		2	–	8	–	0
CCNY		–		0	–	1	–	0

The 1900 Pittsburgh College football team was an American football team that represented Pittsburgh Catholic College of the Holy Ghost—now known as Duquesne University—during the 1900 college football season. The team finished the season with a record of 3–3–1.

== Schedule ==
Date	Time	Opponent	Site	Result	Source
October 6		at Homestead Library & Athletic Club	Steel Works Park; Homestead, PA	L 0–37	
October 13	2:00 p.m.	Boquet AC	Pittsburgh College grounds (Note: Also called "Bluff field", as the campus and its field were situated on The Bluff.); Pittsburgh, PA	W 32–0	
October 20		at East End Athletic Association	P. A. C. Park; Pittsburgh, PA	L 0–28	
October 27	3:30 p.m.	Crescent AC (Pittsburgh)	Pittsburgh College grounds; Pittsburgh, PA	W 24–11	
November 3		Geneva	Pittsburgh College grounds; Pittsburgh, PA	L 0–5	
November 10	3:30 p.m.	at United States Army (Allegheny Arsenal)	Arsenal grounds; Pittsburgh, PA	W 6–5	
November 17		Coraopolis AA	Pittsburgh College grounds; Pittsburgh, PA	T 0–0	
All times are in Eastern time
