= 1900 New Hampshire football team =

American college football season

1900 New Hampshire football
- Conference: Independent
- Record: 1–5–1 (Note: per the University's media guide; 1900 sources differ)
- Head coach: None
- Captain: Rutherford B. Lewis
- Home stadium: College grounds, Durham, NH

1900 Eastern college football independents records
	Conf.			Overall
Team	W	L	T	W		L		T
Yale		–		12	–	0	–	0
Penn		–		12	–	1	–	0
Harvard		–		10	–	1	–	0
Cornell		–		10	–	2	–	0
Geneva		–		5	–	1	–	1
Lafayette		–		9	–	2	–	0
Syracuse		–		7	–	2	–	1
Princeton		–		8	–	3	–	0
Drexel		–		5	–	2	–	0
Fordham		–		3	–	1	–	1
Army		–		7	–	3	–	1
Brown		–		7	–	3	–	1
Columbia		–		7	–	3	–	1
Villanova		–		5	–	2	–	2
Washington & Jefferson		–		6	–	3	–	1
Swarthmore		–		6	–	3	–	2
Holy Cross		–		5	–	3	–	1
Carlisle		–		6	–	4	–	1
Buffalo		–		3	–	2	–	2
Western Univ. of Penn		–		5	–	4	–	0
Bucknell		–		4	–	4	–	1
Dickinson		–		5	–	5	–	0
Pittsburgh College		–		3	–	3	–	1
Rutgers		–		4	–	4	–	0
Vermont		–		4	–	4	–	1
Lehigh		–		5	–	6	–	0
Franklin & Marshall		–		4	–	5	–	0
Temple		–		3	–	4	–	1
Penn State		–		4	–	6	–	1
Amherst		–		4	–	7	–	1
Dartmouth		–		2	–	4	–	2
NYU		–		3	–	6	–	1
Tufts		–		3	–	6	–	1
Wesleyan		–		3	–	6	–	1
New Hampshire		–		1	–	5	–	1
Colgate		–		2	–	8	–	0
CCNY		–		0	–	1	–	0

The 1900 New Hampshire football team (Note: The school did not adopt the Wildcats nickname until February 1926; before then, they were generally referred to as "the blue and white".) was an American football team that represented New Hampshire College of Agriculture and the Mechanic Arts (Note: The school was often referred to as New Hampshire College or New Hampshire State College in newspapers of the era.) during the 1900 college football season—the school became the University of New Hampshire in 1923. The team finished with a record of 1–6–1 or 1–5–1, per 1900 sources or modern sources, respectively.

== Schedule ==
Scoring during this era awarded five points for a touchdown, one point for a conversion kick (extra point), and five points for a field goal. Teams played in the one-platoon system and the forward pass was not yet legal. Games were played in two halves rather than four quarters.

Date	Opponent	Site	per 1900 sources		per modern sources	
Date	Opponent	Site	Result	Source	Result	Source
September 26	at Exeter Academy	Exeter, NH	T 0–0		T 0–0	
September 29	at Bowdoin	Whittier Field · Brunswick, ME	L 0–32		L 0–32	
October 10	at Andover Academy	Andover, MA	L 0–10		L 0–10	
October 13	MIT	Durham, NH	L 0–6		L 0–6	
September 26	Exeter Academy	Durham, NH	L 0–32		L 0–32	
September 26	Burdett College	Durham, NH	W 18–11		W 18–11	
November 3	at Tufts	Medford, MA	L 0–28		L 0–28	
November 21	at Unity Athletic Club	South End Park · Portsmouth, NH	L 5–12		not listed	
Overall record			(1–6–1)		(1–5–1)	

The November 21 loss to the Unity Athletic Club was reported in The Portsmouth Herald, but is absent from other sources.

Contemporary sources are clear that the Andover game was played in Massachusetts; modern sources list the site as Durham. Team captain Lewis suffered a broken leg in the game.

The original schedule for the team, as published in October 1900, included two games against the University of Maine; however, the first Maine–New Hampshire game would not occur until 1903.

The New Hampshire second team (reserves) defeated Dover High School, 11–6, in a game played in Durham on November 15.
