= 1900 Bucknell football team =

American college football season

1900 Bucknell football
- Conference: Independent
- Record: 5–4–1
- Head coach: George W. Hoskins (2nd season)
- Captain: Frank Stanton

1900 Eastern college football independents records
	Conf.			Overall
Team	W	L	T	W		L		T
Yale		–		12	–	0	–	0
Penn		–		12	–	1	–	0
Harvard		–		10	–	1	–	0
Cornell		–		10	–	2	–	0
Geneva		–		5	–	1	–	1
Lafayette		–		9	–	2	–	0
Syracuse		–		7	–	2	–	1
Princeton		–		8	–	3	–	0
Drexel		–		5	–	2	–	0
Fordham		–		3	–	1	–	1
Army		–		7	–	3	–	1
Brown		–		7	–	3	–	1
Columbia		–		7	–	3	–	1
Villanova		–		5	–	2	–	2
Washington & Jefferson		–		6	–	3	–	1
Swarthmore		–		6	–	3	–	2
Holy Cross		–		5	–	3	–	1
Carlisle		–		6	–	4	–	1
Buffalo		–		3	–	2	–	2
Western Univ. of Penn		–		5	–	4	–	0
Bucknell		–		4	–	4	–	1
Dickinson		–		5	–	5	–	0
Pittsburgh College		–		3	–	3	–	1
Rutgers		–		4	–	4	–	0
Vermont		–		4	–	4	–	1
Lehigh		–		5	–	6	–	0
Franklin & Marshall		–		4	–	5	–	0
Temple		–		3	–	4	–	1
Penn State		–		4	–	6	–	1
Amherst		–		4	–	7	–	1
Dartmouth		–		2	–	4	–	2
NYU		–		3	–	6	–	1
Tufts		–		3	–	6	–	1
Wesleyan		–		3	–	6	–	1
New Hampshire		–		1	–	5	–	1
Colgate		–		2	–	8	–	0
CCNY		–		0	–	1	–	0

The 1900 Bucknell football team was an American football team that represented Bucknell University as an independent during the 1900 college football season. Led by second-year head coach George W. Hoskins, Bucknell compiled a record of 4–4–1. Frank Stanton was the team captain.

== Schedule ==
Date	Time	Opponent	Site	Result	Attendance	Source
September 29		Wyoming Seminary	Lewisburg, PA	W 36–0		
October 6		at Cornell	Percy Field; Ithaca, NY	L 0–6		
October 13		at Lehigh	Bethlehem, PA	L 6–12		
October 20		at Duquesne Country & Athletic Club	Exposition Park; Allegheny City, PA	L 0–29	1,000–2,500	
October 27		Williamsport	Lewisburg, PA	W 38–0		
November 3		vs. Penn State	Williamsport, PA	W 12–5		
November 10		Susquehanna	Lewisburg, PA	W 35–0		
November 17		at Army	The Plain; West Point, NY	L 10–18		
November 24		at Villanova	Villanova, PA	T 0–0		
