= 1900 Carlisle Indians football team =

American college football season

1900 Carlisle Indians football
- Conference: Independent
- Record: 6–4–1
- Head coach: Pop Warner (2nd season)
- Captain: Eddie Rogers
- Home stadium: Indian Field

1900 Eastern college football independents records
	Conf.			Overall
Team	W	L	T	W		L		T
Yale		–		12	–	0	–	0
Penn		–		12	–	1	–	0
Harvard		–		10	–	1	–	0
Cornell		–		10	–	2	–	0
Geneva		–		5	–	1	–	1
Lafayette		–		9	–	2	–	0
Syracuse		–		7	–	2	–	1
Princeton		–		8	–	3	–	0
Drexel		–		5	–	2	–	0
Fordham		–		3	–	1	–	1
Army		–		7	–	3	–	1
Brown		–		7	–	3	–	1
Columbia		–		7	–	3	–	1
Villanova		–		5	–	2	–	2
Washington & Jefferson		–		6	–	3	–	1
Swarthmore		–		6	–	3	–	2
Holy Cross		–		5	–	3	–	1
Carlisle		–		6	–	4	–	1
Buffalo		–		3	–	2	–	2
Western Univ. of Penn		–		5	–	4	–	0
Bucknell		–		4	–	4	–	1
Dickinson		–		5	–	5	–	0
Pittsburgh College		–		3	–	3	–	1
Rutgers		–		4	–	4	–	0
Vermont		–		4	–	4	–	1
Lehigh		–		5	–	6	–	0
Franklin & Marshall		–		4	–	5	–	0
Temple		–		3	–	4	–	1
Penn State		–		4	–	6	–	1
Dartmouth		–		2	–	4	–	2
NYU		–		3	–	6	–	1
Tufts		–		3	–	6	–	1
Wesleyan		–		3	–	6	–	1
New Hampshire		–		1	–	5	–	1
Colgate		–		2	–	8	–	0
CCNY		–		0	–	1	–	0

The 1900 Carlisle Indians football team represented the Carlisle Indian Industrial School as an independent during the 1900 college football season. Led by second-year head coach Pop Warner, the Indians compiled a record of 6–4–1 and outscored opponents 207 to 92.

Carlisle defeated Southern champion Virginia. In that game Virginia's Bradley Walker once grabbed Hawley Pierce, Carlisle's biggest player, and carried him ten yards with him dangling over his shoulder.

== Schedule ==
Date	Time	Opponent	Site	Result	Attendance	Source
September 22		Lebanon Valley	Indian Field; Carlisle, PA	W 34–0	2,000	
September 26		vs. Dickinson	Carlisle, PA	W 21–0		
September 29		Susquehanna	Indian Field; Carlisle, PA	W 46–0		
October 6		Gettysburg	Indian Field; Carlisle, PA	W 45–0		
October 13	4:00 p.m.	vs. Virginia	National Park; Washington, DC	W 16–2		
October 15		at University of Maryland, Baltimore	Union Park; Baltimore, MD	W 27–0		
October 27		at Harvard	Soldiers' Field; Boston, MA	L 5–17	15,000	
November 10		at Yale	Yale Field; New Haven, CT	L 0–35		
November 17		at Penn	Franklin Field; Philadelphia, PA	L 6–16	18,000	
November 24		vs. Washington & Jefferson	Exposition Park; Pittsburgh, PA	T 5–5		
November 29		at Columbia	Manhattan Field; New York, NY	L 6–17		
