= 1900 Lehigh football team =

American college football season

1900 Lehigh football
- Conference: Independent
- Record: 5–6
- Head coach: Walter R. Okeson (1st season)

1900 Eastern college football independents records
	Conf.			Overall
Team	W	L	T	W		L		T
Yale		–		12	–	0	–	0
Penn		–		12	–	1	–	0
Harvard		–		10	–	1	–	0
Cornell		–		10	–	2	–	0
Geneva		–		5	–	1	–	1
Lafayette		–		9	–	2	–	0
Syracuse		–		7	–	2	–	1
Princeton		–		8	–	3	–	0
Drexel		–		5	–	2	–	0
Fordham		–		3	–	1	–	1
Army		–		7	–	3	–	1
Brown		–		7	–	3	–	1
Columbia		–		7	–	3	–	1
Villanova		–		5	–	2	–	2
Washington & Jefferson		–		6	–	3	–	1
Swarthmore		–		6	–	3	–	2
Holy Cross		–		5	–	3	–	1
Carlisle		–		6	–	4	–	1
Buffalo		–		3	–	2	–	2
Western Univ. of Penn		–		5	–	4	–	0
Bucknell		–		4	–	4	–	1
Dickinson		–		5	–	5	–	0
Pittsburgh College		–		3	–	3	–	1
Rutgers		–		4	–	4	–	0
Vermont		–		4	–	4	–	1
Lehigh		–		5	–	6	–	0
Frankin & Marshall		–		4	–	5	–	0
Temple		–		3	–	4	–	1
Penn State		–		4	–	6	–	1
Amherst		–		4	–	7	–	1
Dartmouth		–		2	–	4	–	2
NYU		–		3	–	6	–	1
Tufts		–		3	–	6	–	1
Wesleyan		–		3	–	6	–	1
New Hampshire		–		1	–	5	–	1
Colgate		–		2	–	8	–	0
CCNY		–		0	–	1	–	0

The 1900 Lehigh football team was an American football team that represented Lehigh University as an independent during the 1900 college football season. In its first and only season under head coach Walter R. Okeson, the team compiled a 5–6 record and was outscored by a total of 172 to 79.

== Schedule ==
Date	Opponent	Site	Result	Attendance	Source
September 29	at Penn	Franklin Field; Philadelphia, PA	L 6–27		
October 6	at Princeton	University Field; Princeton, NJ	L 5–12		
October 13	Bucknell	Bethlehem, PA	W 12–6		
October 20	Rutgers	Bethlehem, PA	W 21–0		
October 24	at Navy	Worden Field; Annapolis, MD	L 0–15		
November 3	Lafayette	Bethlehem, PA (rivalry)	L 0–34		
November 10	at Haverford	Haverford, PA	W 11–10		
November 14	at Dickinson	Carlisle, PA	W 6–0		
November 17	at Homestead Library & Athletic Club	Steel Works Park; Homestead, PA	L 0–50		
November 24	at Lafayette	March Field; Easton, PA	L 0–18		
November 29	Swarthmore	Bethlehem, PA	W 18–0		
