= 1900 Drexel Dragons football team =

American college football season

1900 Drexel Dragons football
- Conference: Independent
- Record: 5–2
- Head coach: None

1900 Eastern college football independents records
	Conf.			Overall
Team	W	L	T	W		L		T
Yale		–		12	–	0	–	0
Penn		–		12	–	1	–	0
Harvard		–		10	–	1	–	0
Cornell		–		10	–	2	–	0
Geneva		–		5	–	1	–	1
Lafayette		–		9	–	2	–	0
Syracuse		–		7	–	2	–	1
Princeton		–		8	–	3	–	0
Drexel		–		5	–	2	–	0
Fordham		–		3	–	1	–	1
Army		–		7	–	3	–	1
Brown		–		7	–	3	–	1
Columbia		–		7	–	3	–	1
Villanova		–		5	–	2	–	2
Washington & Jefferson		–		6	–	3	–	1
Swarthmore		–		6	–	3	–	2
Holy Cross		–		5	–	3	–	1
Carlisle		–		6	–	4	–	1
Buffalo		–		3	–	2	–	2
Western Univ. of Penn		–		5	–	4	–	0
Bucknell		–		4	–	4	–	1
Dickinson		–		5	–	5	–	0
Pittsburgh College		–		3	–	3	–	1
Rutgers		–		4	–	4	–	0
Vermont		–		4	–	4	–	1
Lehigh		–		5	–	6	–	0
Franklin & Marshall		–		4	–	5	–	0
Temple		–		3	–	4	–	1
Penn State		–		4	–	6	–	1
Amherst		–		4	–	7	–	1
Dartmouth		–		2	–	4	–	2
NYU		–		3	–	6	–	1
Tufts		–		3	–	6	–	1
Wesleyan		–		3	–	6	–	1
New Hampshire		–		1	–	5	–	1
Colgate		–		2	–	8	–	0
CCNY		–		0	–	1	–	0

The 1900 Drexel Dragons football team represented the Drexel Institute—now known as Drexel University–as an independent during the 1900 college football season. The team did not have a head coach.

== Schedule ==
Date	Opponent	Site	Result	Source
October 12	at DeLancey School (PA)		W 2–0	
October 15	Episcopal Academy	Tioga Cricket Club Ground; Philadelphia, Pennsylvania	W 44–0	
October 23	William Penn Charter School	P.R.R. Y.M.C.A. Grounds (52nd/Jefferson Streets); Philadelphia, Pennsylvania	L 0–16	
November 13	Central High School	P.R.R. Y.M.C.A. Grounds	W 18–0	
November 16	at Swarthmore Preparatory School		L 5–30	
November 24	West Jersey Academy		W 11–5	
Unknown	Philadelphia Law School		W 17–0	
