= 1900 Brown Bears football team =

American college football season

1900 Brown Bears football
- Conference: Independent
- Record: 7–3–1
- Head coach: Edward N. Robinson (3rd season)
- Captain: L. Washburn
- Home stadium: Andrews Field

1900 Eastern college football independents records
	Conf.			Overall
Team	W	L	T	W		L		T
Yale		–		12	–	0	–	0
Penn		–		12	–	1	–	0
Harvard		–		10	–	1	–	0
Cornell		–		10	–	2	–	0
Geneva		–		5	–	1	–	1
Lafayette		–		9	–	2	–	0
Syracuse		–		7	–	2	–	1
Princeton		–		8	–	3	–	0
Drexel		–		5	–	2	–	0
Fordham		–		3	–	1	–	1
Army		–		7	–	3	–	1
Brown		–		7	–	3	–	1
Columbia		–		7	–	3	–	1
Villanova		–		5	–	2	–	2
Washington & Jefferson		–		6	–	3	–	1
Swarthmore		–		6	–	3	–	2
Holy Cross		–		5	–	3	–	1
Carlisle		–		6	–	4	–	1
Buffalo		–		3	–	2	–	2
Western Univ. of Penn		–		5	–	4	–	0
Bucknell		–		4	–	4	–	1
Dickinson		–		5	–	5	–	0
Pittsburgh College		–		3	–	3	–	1
Rutgers		–		4	–	4	–	0
Vermont		–		4	–	4	–	1
Lehigh		–		5	–	6	–	0
Franklin & Marshall		–		4	–	5	–	0
Temple		–		3	–	4	–	1
Penn State		–		4	–	6	–	1
Amherst		–		4	–	7	–	1
Dartmouth		–		2	–	4	–	2
NYU		–		3	–	6	–	1
Tufts		–		3	–	6	–	1
Wesleyan		–		3	–	6	–	1
New Hampshire		–		1	–	5	–	1
Colgate		–		2	–	8	–	0
CCNY		–		0	–	1	–	0

The 1900 Brown Bears football team represented Brown University as an independent during the 1900 college football season. Led by third-year head coach Edward N. Robinson, Brown compiled a record of 7–3–1. The team's captain was L. Washburn.

== Schedule ==
Date	Time	Opponent	Site	Result	Attendance	Source
September 29		Colby	Andrews Field; Providence, RI	W 27–0		
October 6		Holy Cross	Andrews Field; Providence, RI	W 18–0		
October 10		MIT	Andrews Field; Providence, RI	W 22–0		
October 13		at Penn	Franklin Field; Philadelphia, PA	L 0–12		
October 20		at Chicago	Marshall Field; Chicago, IL	W 11–6		
October 27	3:10 p.m.	Princeton	Andrews Field; Providence, RI	L 5–17	5,000	
November 3		Needham Athletic Club	Andrews Field; Providence, RI	W 12–5		
November 6		Tufts	Andrews Field; Providence, RI	W 26–5		
November 10		at Harvard	Soldiers' Field; Boston, MA	L 6–11	8,000	
November 17		at Dartmouth	Alumni Field; Hanover, NH	W 12–5		
November 24		Syracuse	Andrews Field; Providence, RI	T 6–6		
