= 1900 Swarthmore Quakers football team =

American college football season

1900 Swarthmore Quakers football
- Conference: Independent
- Record: 6–3–2
- Head coach: George H. Brooke (2nd season)
- Home stadium: Whittier Field

1900 Eastern college football independents records
	Conf.			Overall
Team	W	L	T	W		L		T
Yale		–		12	–	0	–	0
Penn		–		12	–	1	–	0
Harvard		–		10	–	1	–	0
Cornell		–		10	–	2	–	0
Geneva		–		5	–	1	–	1
Lafayette		–		9	–	2	–	0
Syracuse		–		7	–	2	–	1
Princeton		–		8	–	3	–	0
Drexel		–		5	–	2	–	0
Fordham		–		3	–	1	–	1
Army		–		7	–	3	–	1
Brown		–		7	–	3	–	1
Columbia		–		7	–	3	–	1
Villanova		–		5	–	2	–	2
Washington & Jefferson		–		6	–	3	–	1
Swarthmore		–		6	–	3	–	2
Holy Cross		–		5	–	3	–	1
Carlisle		–		6	–	4	–	1
Buffalo		–		3	–	2	–	2
Western Univ. of Penn		–		5	–	4	–	0
Bucknell		–		4	–	4	–	1
Dickinson		–		5	–	5	–	0
Pittsburgh College		–		3	–	3	–	1
Rutgers		–		4	–	4	–	0
Vermont		–		4	–	4	–	1
Lehigh		–		5	–	6	–	0
Franklin & Marshall		–		4	–	5	–	0
Temple		–		3	–	4	–	1
Penn State		–		4	–	6	–	1
Amherst		–		4	–	7	–	1
Dartmouth		–		2	–	4	–	2
NYU		–		3	–	6	–	1
Tufts		–		3	–	6	–	1
Wesleyan		–		3	–	6	–	1
New Hampshire		–		1	–	5	–	1
Colgate		–		2	–	8	–	0
CCNY		–		0	–	1	–	0

The 1900 Swarthmore Quakers football team was an American football team that represented Swarthmore College as an independent during the 1900 college football season. The team compiled a 6–3–2 record. George H. Brooke was the head coach.

== Schedule ==
Date	Opponent	Site	Result	Source
September 29	Swarthmore alumni	Swarthmore, PA	W 27–5	
October 6	Dickinson	Swarthmore, PA	L 0–12	
October 13	at Lafayette	March Field; Easton, PA	L 2–34	
October 17	Ursinus	Whittier Field; Swarthmore, PA	W 17–5	
October 20	St. John's (MD)	Swarthmore, PA	T 6–6	
October 24	at Pennsylvania Military	Chester, PA	W 28–5	
October 27	Chester High School alumni	Swarthmore, PA	W 6–2	
November 3	at Georgetown	Georgetown Field; Washington, DC	T 16–16	
November 10	Franklin & Marshall	Swarthmore, PA	W 24–10	
November 24	Haverford	Swarthmore, PA (rivalry)	W 17–10	
November 29	at Lehigh	Bethlehem, PA	L 0–18	
