= 1900 Yale Bulldogs football team =

American college football season

1900 Yale Bulldogs football
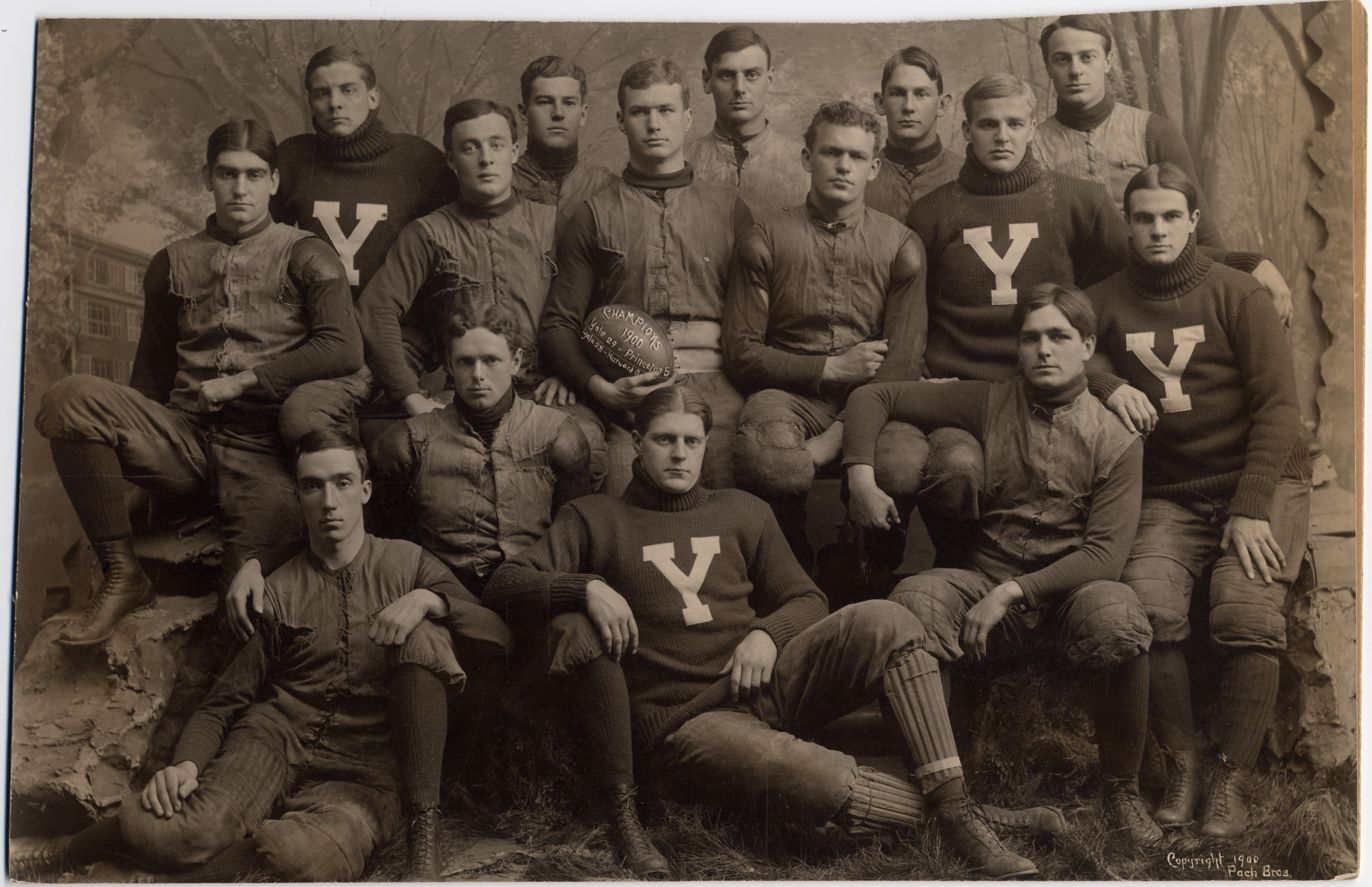

National champion
- Conference: Independent
- Record: 12–0
- Head coach: Malcolm McBride (1st season)
- Captain: Gordon Brown
- Home stadium: Yale Field

1900 Eastern college football independents records
| | Conf. | | | Overall |
| Team | W | L | T | W | | L | | T |
|---|---|---|---|---|---|---|---|---|
| Yale | | – | | 12 | – | 0 | – | 0 |
| Penn | | – | | 12 | – | 1 | – | 0 |
| Harvard | | – | | 10 | – | 1 | – | 0 |
| Cornell | | – | | 10 | – | 2 | – | 0 |
| Geneva | | – | | 5 | – | 1 | – | 1 |
| Lafayette | | – | | 9 | – | 2 | – | 0 |
| Syracuse | | – | | 7 | – | 2 | – | 1 |
| Princeton | | – | | 8 | – | 3 | – | 0 |
| Drexel | | – | | 5 | – | 2 | – | 0 |
| Fordham | | – | | 3 | – | 1 | – | 1 |
| Army | | – | | 7 | – | 3 | – | 1 |
| Brown | | – | | 7 | – | 3 | – | 1 |
| Columbia | | – | | 7 | – | 3 | – | 1 |
| Villanova | | – | | 5 | – | 2 | – | 2 |
| Washington & Jefferson | | – | | 6 | – | 3 | – | 1 |
| Swarthmore | | – | | 6 | – | 3 | – | 2 |
| Holy Cross | | – | | 5 | – | 3 | – | 1 |
| Carlisle | | – | | 6 | – | 4 | – | 1 |
| Buffalo | | – | | 3 | – | 2 | – | 2 |
| Western Univ. of Penn | | – | | 5 | – | 4 | – | 0 |
| Bucknell | | – | | 4 | – | 4 | – | 1 |
| Dickinson | | – | | 5 | – | 5 | – | 0 |
| Pittsburgh College | | – | | 3 | – | 3 | – | 1 |
| Rutgers | | – | | 4 | – | 4 | – | 0 |
| Vermont | | – | | 4 | – | 4 | – | 1 |
| Lehigh | | – | | 5 | – | 6 | – | 0 |
| Franklin & Marshall | | – | | 4 | – | 5 | – | 0 |
| Temple | | – | | 3 | – | 4 | – | 1 |
| Penn State | | – | | 4 | – | 6 | – | 1 |
| Amherst | | – | | 4 | – | 7 | – | 1 |
| Dartmouth | | – | | 2 | – | 4 | – | 2 |
| NYU | | – | | 3 | – | 6 | – | 1 |
| Tufts | | – | | 3 | – | 6 | – | 1 |
| Wesleyan | | – | | 3 | – | 6 | – | 1 |
| New Hampshire | | – | | 1 | – | 5 | – | 1 |
| Colgate | | – | | 2 | – | 8 | – | 0 |
| CCNY | | – | | 0 | – | 1 | – | 0 |

The 1900 Yale Bulldogs football team was an American football team that represented Yale University as an independent during the 1900 college football season. The team finished with a 12–0 record, shut out ten of twelve opponents, and outscored all opponents by a total of 336 to 10. Malcolm McBride was the head coach, and Gordon Brown was the team captain.

Yale is the only team retroactively named as the national champion for 1900 by NCAA-designated "major selectors". Those include the Billingsley Report, Helms Athletic Foundation, Houlgate System, National Championship Foundation, and Parke H. Davis.

Seven Yale players were selected as consensus first-team players on the 1900 All-America team. The team's consensus All-Americans were: quarterback William Fincke; halfback George B. Chadwick; fullback Perry Hale; center Herman Olcott; guard Gordon Brown; and tackles George S. Stillman and James Bloomer.

== Schedule ==
| Date | Time | Opponent | Site | Result | Attendance | Source |
|---|---|---|---|---|---|---|
| September 29 | | Trinity (CT) | Yale Field; New Haven, CT | W 22–0 | | |
| October 3 | | Amherst | Yale Field; New Haven, CT | W 27–0 | 1,500 | |
| October 6 | | Tufts | Yale Field; New Haven, CT | W 30–0 | 2,300 | |
| October 10 | | Bates | Yale Field; New Haven, CT | W 50–0 | | |
| October 13 | 3:15 p.m. | vs. Dartmouth | Cedar St. grounds; Newton, MA | W 17–0 | | |
| October 17 | | Bowdoin | Yale Field; New Haven, CT | W 30–0 | | |
| October 20 | | Wesleyan | Yale Field; New Haven, CT | W 38–0 | 4,000 | |
| October 27 | | at Columbia | Manhattan Field; New York, NY | W 12–5 | 8,000 | |
| November 3 | | at Army | The Plain; West Point, NY | W 18–0 | | |
| November 10 | | Carlisle | Yale Field; New Haven, CT | W 35–0 | | |
| November 17 | 2:45 p.m. | at Princeton | University Field; Princeton, NJ (rivalry) | W 29–5 | | |
| November 24 | | Harvard | Yale Field; New Haven, CT (rivalry) | W 28–0 | 20,000 | |

== Roster ==
- Thomas S. Adams, HB
- James Bloomer, T
- Gordon Brown, G
- George B. Chadwick, HB
- Clarence P. Cook, HB
- Sherman Coy, E
- Charles Dupee, E
- Ferguson, E
- William Fincke, QB
- Charles Gould, E
- Perry Hale, FB
- Chauncey J. Hamlin, G
- Henry Holt, C
- Alvan W. Hyde, FB
- Philip H. Kunzig, T
- Miller, HB
- Herman Olcott, C
- Charles D. Rafferty, E
- Ralph R. Richardson, G
- Albert Sharpe, HB
- Richard Sheldon, G
- George S. Stillman, T
- Leonard M. Thomas
- Tomlinson, T
- G. B. Ward, E
- James H. Wear, QB
- Frederick W. Wilhelmi, HB
