= Marshall Mills =

American football player and coach (1877–1949)

Biographical details
- Born: 1877; New York, New York, U.S.
- Died: May 30, 1949 (aged 72); Marion, North Carolina, U.S.

Playing career
- 1898–1901: Princeton
- Position: Guard

Coaching career (HC unless noted)
- 1902: Princeton (assistant)
- 1905: NYU

Head coaching record
- Overall: 3–3–1

Marshall Freeborn Mills (1877 – May 30, 1949) was an American college football player and coach. He was the eighth head football coach at New York University (NYU), serving for one season, in 1905, and leading the Violets to a record of 3–3–1.

A native of New York City, Mills attend The Hill School in Pottstown, Pennsylvania. He played football as a guard at Princeton University from 1898 to 1901 and graduated in 1902. In 1902, he assisted in coaching the Princeton football team.

Mills moved to Spruce Pine, North Carolina in 1920 and had a business interest in mining operations in the area. He was a founder and president of Victor Mica Company. In 1935, he established the Boone Forge, which produced building hardware and wrought iron work used in Colonial Williamsburg. Mills died on May 30, 1949, at a hospital in Marion, North Carolina, following a short illness. He was buried at Woodlawn Cemetery in The Bronx.

== Head coaching record ==
Year	Team	Overall	Conference	Standing	Bowl/playoffs
NYU Violets (Independent) (1905)
1905	NYU	3–3–1			
NYU:		3–3–1			
Total:		3–3–1			
