= Oliver D. Mann =

American football player and coach (1877–1956)

Biographical details
- Born: December 10, 1877; Danville, Illinois, U.S.
- Died: July 9, 1956 (aged 78); Illinois, U.S.

Playing career
- 1897–1900: Rutgers

Coaching career (HC unless noted)
- 1901: Rose Polytechnic
- 1903, 1905: Rutgers

Head coaching record
- Overall: 7–16–1

Oliver Davis Mann (December 10, 1877 – July 9, 1956) was an American football player and coach. A native of Danville, Illinois, he attended Rutgers College, graduating in the Class of 1901. He played college football for the Rutgers Scarlet Knights from 1897 to 1900. The New York Times wrote that Mann "for three years was the Captain of the best team Rutgers College ever had on the gridiron." He was also Rutgers' head football coach in the 1903 and 1905 seasons. In two seasons as head coach, Mann compiled a record of 7–10–1. He later resided in Danville, Illinois. In a draft registration card completed at the time of World War I, Mann indicated that he was a self-employed lawyer in Danville. He died in July 1956 and was buried at the Spring Hill Mausoleum in Danville.

== Head coaching record ==
Year	Team	Overall	Conference	Standing	Bowl/playoffs
Rose Polytechnic (Independent) (1901)
1901	Rose Polytechnic	0–6			
Rose Polytechnic:		0–6			
Rutgers Queensmen (Independent) (1903)
1903	Rutgers	4–4–1			
Rutgers Queensmen (Independent) (1905)
1905	Rutgers	3–6			
Rutgers:		7–10–1			
Total:		7–16–1			
