= 1900 Harvard Crimson football team =

American college football season

1900 Harvard Crimson football
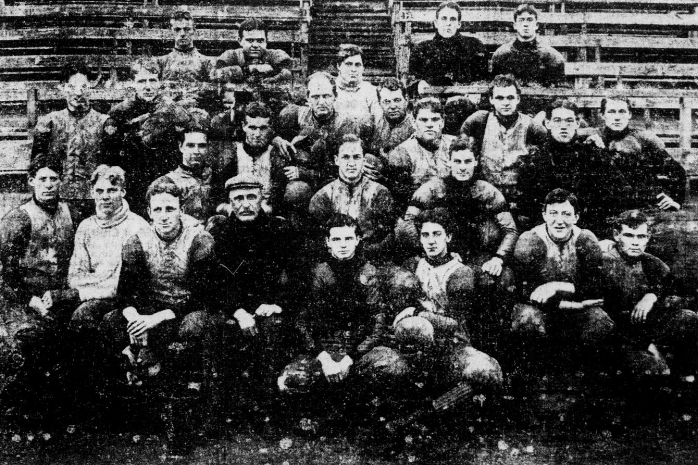
- Conference: Independent
- Record: 10–1
- Head coach: Benjamin Dibblee (2nd season)
- Captain: Charles Dudley Daly
- Home stadium: Soldiers' Field

1900 Eastern college football independents records
	Conf.			Overall
Team	W	L	T	W		L		T
Yale		–		12	–	0	–	0
Penn		–		12	–	1	–	0
Harvard		–		10	–	1	–	0
Cornell		–		10	–	2	–	0
Geneva		–		5	–	1	–	1
Lafayette		–		9	–	2	–	0
Syracuse		–		7	–	2	–	1
Princeton		–		8	–	3	–	0
Drexel		–		5	–	2	–	0
Fordham		–		3	–	1	–	1
Army		–		7	–	3	–	1
Brown		–		7	–	3	–	1
Columbia		–		7	–	3	–	1
Villanova		–		5	–	2	–	2
Washington & Jefferson		–		6	–	3	–	1
Swarthmore		–		6	–	3	–	2
Holy Cross		–		5	–	3	–	1
Carlisle		–		6	–	4	–	1
Buffalo		–		3	–	2	–	2
Western Univ. of Penn		–		5	–	4	–	0
Bucknell		–		4	–	4	–	1
Dickinson		–		5	–	5	–	0
Pittsburgh College		–		3	–	3	–	1
Rutgers		–		4	–	4	–	0
Vermont		–		4	–	4	–	1
Lehigh		–		5	–	6	–	0
Franklin & Marshall		–		4	–	5	–	0
Temple		–		3	–	4	–	1
Penn State		–		4	–	6	–	1
Amherst		–		4	–	7	–	1
Dartmouth		–		2	–	4	–	2
NYU		–		3	–	6	–	1
Tufts		–		3	–	6	–	1
Wesleyan		–		3	–	6	–	1
New Hampshire		–		1	–	5	–	1
Colgate		–		2	–	8	–	0
CCNY		–		0	–	1	–	0

The 1900 Harvard Crimson football team represented Harvard University in the 1900 college football season. In its second season under head coach Benjamin Dibblee, Harvard compiled a 10–1 record, shut out seven of 11 opponents, and outscored all opponents by a total of 205 to 44. The 1900 team won its first 10 games, but closed the season with a 28–0 loss against rival Yale.

Walter Camp selected three Harvard players as first-team selections to his 1900 College Football All-America Team. They were ends John Hallowell and Dave Campbell and quarterback Charles Dudley Daly.

== Schedule ==
Date	Time	Opponent	Site	Result	Attendance	Source
September 29	3:00 p.m.	Wesleyan	Soldiers' Field; Boston, MA	W 24–0	1,000–1,500	
October 3	4:00 p.m.	Williams	Soldiers' Field; Boston, MA	W 12–0	1,000	
October 6		Bowdoin	Soldiers' Field; Boston, MA	W 12–0	2,500	
October 10	4:00 p.m.	Amherst	Soldiers' Field; Boston, MA	W 18–0	800	
October 13		Columbia	Soldiers' Field; Boston, MA	W 24–0	8,000	
October 17		Bates	Soldiers' Field; Boston, MA	W 41–0	1,500	
October 20		at Army	The Plain; West Point, NY	W 29–0	5,000	
October 27		Carlisle	Soldiers' Field; Boston, MA	W 17–5	15,000	
November 3		Penn	Soldiers' Field; Boston, MA (rivalry)	W 17–5	17,000	
November 10		Brown	Soldiers' Field; Boston, MA	W 11–6	8,000	
November 24		at Yale	Yale Field; New Haven, CT (rivalry)	L 0–28	20,000	
