= 1900 Lafayette football team =

American college football season

1900 Lafayette football
- Conference: Independent
- Record: 9–2
- Head coach: Samuel B. Newton (2nd season)
- Captain: John Chalmers
- Home stadium: March Field

1900 Eastern college football independents records
	Conf.			Overall
Team	W	L	T	W		L		T
Yale		–		12	–	0	–	0
Penn		–		12	–	1	–	0
Harvard		–		10	–	1	–	0
Cornell		–		10	–	2	–	0
Geneva		–		5	–	1	–	1
Lafayette		–		9	–	2	–	0
Syracuse		–		7	–	2	–	1
Princeton		–		8	–	3	–	0
Drexel		–		5	–	2	–	0
Fordham		–		3	–	1	–	1
Army		–		7	–	3	–	1
Brown		–		7	–	3	–	1
Columbia		–		7	–	3	–	1
Villanova		–		5	–	2	–	2
Washington & Jefferson		–		6	–	3	–	1
Swarthmore		–		6	–	3	–	2
Holy Cross		–		5	–	3	–	1
Carlisle		–		6	–	4	–	1
Buffalo		–		3	–	2	–	2
Western Univ. of Penn		–		5	–	4	–	0
Bucknell		–		4	–	4	–	1
Dickinson		–		5	–	5	–	0
Pittsburgh College		–		3	–	3	–	1
Rutgers		–		4	–	4	–	0
Vermont		–		4	–	4	–	1
Lehigh		–		5	–	6	–	0
Franklin & Marshall		–		4	–	5	–	0
Temple		–		3	–	4	–	1
Penn State		–		4	–	6	–	1
Amherst		–		4	–	7	–	1
Dartmouth		–		2	–	4	–	2
NYU		–		3	–	6	–	1
Tufts		–		3	–	6	–	1
Wesleyan		–		3	–	6	–	1
New Hampshire		–		1	–	5	–	1
Colgate		–		2	–	8	–	0
CCNY		–		0	–	1	–	0

The 1900 Lafayette football team represented Lafayette College in the 1900 college football season. Lafayette shut out seven opponents and finished with a 9–2 record in their second year under head coach Samuel B. Newton. Significant games included victories over Lehigh (34–0 and 18–0), and Cornell (17–0), and losses to Princeton (0–5) and Penn (5–12). The 1900 Lafayette team outscored its opponents by a combined total of 214 to 25.

Three Lafayette players received recognition on the 1900 College Football All-America Team. They are: center Walter E. Bachman (Caspar Whitney, 1st team); guard Trout (Whitney, 2nd team); and fullback David Dudley Cure (Walter Camp, 2nd team; deemed "ineligible" by Whitney).

== Schedule ==
Date	Opponent	Site	Result	Source
October 3	Ursinus	March Field; Easton, PA	W 34–0	
October 6	Susquehanna	March Field; Easton, PA	W 35–0	
October 10	Manhattan College	March Field; Easton, PA	W 11–0	
October 13	Swarthmore	March Field; Easton, PA	W 34–2	
October 20	Princeton	March Field; Easton, PA	L 0–5	
October 27	Newark A.C.	March Field; Easton, PA	W 16–0	
November 3	at Lehigh	Bethlehem, PA (rivalry)	W 34–0	
November 10	at Penn	Franklin Field; Philadelphia, PA	L 5–12	
November 17	Cornell	March Field; Easton, PA	W 17–0	
November 24	Lehigh	March Field; Easton, PA	W 18–0	
November 29	Dickinson	March Field; Easton, PA	W 10–6	
