= Williamson Pell =

American football player and banker

Profile
- Position: Tackle

Personal information
- Born: July 5, 1881; Goshen, New York, U.S.
- Died: August 22, 1949 (aged 68); New York City, U.S.

Career information
- College: Princeton University

Awards and highlights
- Second-team All-American (1899); Third-team All-American (1901)

Henry Williamson Pell (c. 1881 – August 22, 1949) was an American football player and banker. He was the captain of the Princeton Tigers football teams in 1900 and 1901. He worked for the United States Trust Company for 37 years and served as its president from 1938-1947, and chairman from 1947-1949.

== Early life ==
Pell was born in Goshen, New York, and grew up in Brooklyn. He attended the Brooklyn Polytechnic Preparatory School before enrolling at Princeton University. Pell played college football for the Princeton Tigers football team from 1899 to 1901. He played at the tackle position and was selected by the New York Post as a second-team All-American in 1901. He was also the captain of the Princeton football teams in both 1900 and 1901. Pell was six feet, 1 inch tall and weighed 175 pounds as a football player at Princeton.

== Business career ==
After graduating from Princeton in 1902, he received a degree from New York Law School in 1904. He practiced law in New York from 1904 to 1912. In 1912, Pell joined the United States Trust Company of New York. He remained with the United States Trust Company for 37 years, serving as its president from 1938 to 1947. He continued to serve as the company's chairman of the board until his death in 1949 at age 68.
