= 1900 Columbia Blue and White football team =

American college football season

1900 Columbia Blue and White football
- Conference: Independent
- Record: 7–3–1
- Head coach: George Sanford (2nd season)
- Captain: Bill Morley
- Home stadium: Manhattan Field

1900 Eastern college football independents records
	Conf.			Overall
Team	W	L	T	W		L		T
Yale		–		12	–	0	–	0
Penn		–		12	–	1	–	0
Harvard		–		10	–	1	–	0
Cornell		–		10	–	2	–	0
Geneva		–		5	–	1	–	1
Lafayette		–		9	–	2	–	0
Syracuse		–		7	–	2	–	1
Princeton		–		8	–	3	–	0
Drexel		–		5	–	2	–	0
Fordham		–		3	–	1	–	1
Army		–		7	–	3	–	1
Brown		–		7	–	3	–	1
Columbia		–		7	–	3	–	1
Villanova		–		5	–	2	–	2
Washington & Jefferson		–		6	–	3	–	1
Swarthmore		–		6	–	3	–	2
Holy Cross		–		5	–	3	–	1
Carlisle		–		6	–	4	–	1
Buffalo		–		3	–	2	–	2
Western Univ. of Penn		–		5	–	4	–	0
Bucknell		–		4	–	4	–	1
Dickinson		–		5	–	5	–	0
Pittsburgh College		–		3	–	3	–	1
Rutgers		–		4	–	4	–	0
Vermont		–		4	–	4	–	1
Lehigh		–		5	–	6	–	0
Franklin & Marshall		–		4	–	5	–	0
Temple		–		3	–	4	–	1
Penn State		–		4	–	6	–	1
Dartmouth		–		2	–	4	–	2
NYU		–		3	–	6	–	1
Tufts		–		3	–	6	–	1
Wesleyan		–		3	–	6	–	1
New Hampshire		–		1	–	5	–	1
Colgate		–		2	–	8	–	0
CCNY		–		0	–	1	–	0

The 1900 Columbia Blue and White football team was an American football team that represented Columbia University as an independent during the 1900 college football season. In its second season under head coach George Sanford, the team compiled a 7–3–1 record and outscored opponents by a total of 124 to 77, including six shutouts. Bill Morley was the team captain. Columbia played home games at Manhattan Field in Upper Manhattan.

Columbia's sports teams were commonly called the "Blue and White" in this era, but had no official nickname. The name "Lions" would not be adopted until 1910.

== Schedule ==
Date	Time	Opponent	Site	Result	Attendance	Source
October 3		at Rutgers	Neilson Field; New Brunswick, NJ	W 11–0		
October 6		Wesleyan	Manhattan Field; New York, NY	W 12–0	2,000	
October 10		Williams	Manhattan Field; New York, NY	T 0–0	3,000	
October 13		at Harvard	Soldiers' Field; Cambridge, MA	L 0–24	8,000	
October 17		Stevens	Manhattan Field; New York, NY	W 45–0		
October 20	3:00 p.m.	at Penn	Franklin Field; Philadelphia, PA	L 0–30		
October 27		Yale	Manhattan Field; New York, NY	L 5–12	8,000	
November 6		Princeton	Manhattan Field; New York, NY	W 6–5	10,000	
November 10	3:30 p.m.	at Buffalo	Buffalo Athletic Field; Buffalo, NY	W 17–0	4,000	
November 17		at Navy	Worden Field; Annapolis, MD	W 11–0		
November 29		Carlisle	Manhattan Field; New York, NY	W 17–6		
