= 1900 Penn Quakers football team =

American college football season

1900 Penn Quakers football
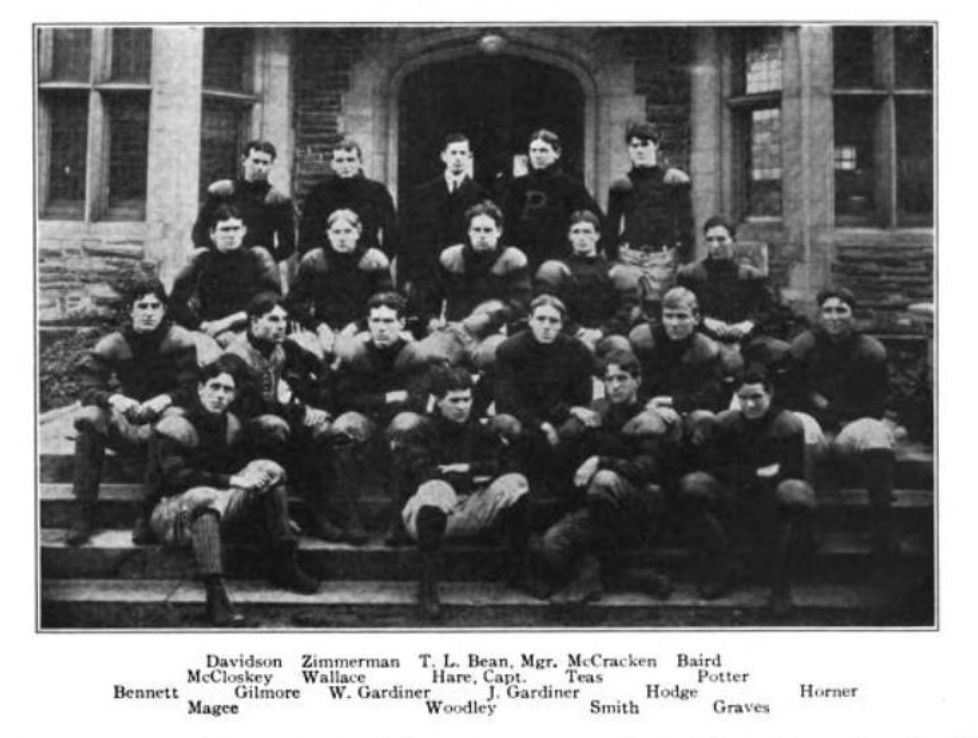
- Conference: Independent
- Record: 12–1
- Head coach: George Washington Woodruff (9th season)
- Captain: Truxtun Hare
- Home stadium: Franklin Field

1900 Eastern college football independents records
	Conf.			Overall
Team	W	L	T	W		L		T
Yale		–		12	–	0	–	0
Penn		–		12	–	1	–	0
Harvard		–		10	–	1	–	0
Cornell		–		10	–	2	–	0
Geneva		–		5	–	1	–	1
Lafayette		–		9	–	2	–	0
Syracuse		–		7	–	2	–	1
Princeton		–		8	–	3	–	0
Drexel		–		5	–	2	–	0
Fordham		–		3	–	1	–	1
Army		–		7	–	3	–	1
Brown		–		7	–	3	–	1
Columbia		–		7	–	3	–	1
Villanova		–		5	–	2	–	2
Washington & Jefferson		–		6	–	3	–	1
Swarthmore		–		6	–	3	–	2
Holy Cross		–		5	–	3	–	1
Carlisle		–		6	–	4	–	1
Buffalo		–		3	–	2	–	2
Western Univ. of Penn		–		5	–	4	–	0
Bucknell		–		4	–	4	–	1
Dickinson		–		5	–	5	–	0
Pittsburgh College		–		3	–	3	–	1
Rutgers		–		4	–	4	–	0
Vermont		–		4	–	4	–	1
Lehigh		–		5	–	6	–	0
Franklin & Marshall		–		4	–	5	–	0
Temple		–		3	–	4	–	1
Penn State		–		4	–	6	–	1
Dartmouth		–		2	–	4	–	2
NYU		–		3	–	6	–	1
Tufts		–		3	–	6	–	1
Wesleyan		–		3	–	6	–	1
New Hampshire		–		1	–	5	–	1
Colgate		–		2	–	8	–	0
CCNY		–		0	–	1	–	0

The 1900 Penn Quakers football team represented the University of Pennsylvania as an independent during the 1900 college football season. The Quakers finished with a 12–1 record in their ninth year under head coach and College Football Hall of Fame inductee, George Washington Woodruff. Significant games included victories over Penn State (17–5), Chicago (41–0), Carlisle (16–6), and Navy (28–6), and a loss to Harvard (17–5). The 1900 Penn team outscored its opponents by a combined total of 335 to 45. Four Penn players received recognition on the 1900 College Football All-America Team: guard Truxtun Hare (consensus 1st-team All-American); tackle Blondy Wallace (Walter Camp, 2nd team); guard John Teas (Camp, 3rd team); and fullback Josiah McCracken (Camp, 3rd team).

== Schedule ==
Date	Opponent	Site	Result	Attendance	Source
September 29	Lehigh	Franklin Field; Philadelphia, PA	W 27–6		
October 3	Franklin & Marshall	Franklin Field; Philadelphia, PA	W 47–0		
October 6	Haverford	Franklin Field; Philadelphia, PA	W 38–0		
October 10	Dickinson	Franklin Field; Philadelphia, PA	W 35–0		
October 13	Brown	Franklin Field; Philadelphia, PA	W 12–0		
October 17	Penn State	Franklin Field; Philadelphia, PA	W 17–5	1,500	
October 20	Columbia	Franklin Field; Philadelphia, PA	W 30–0		
October 27	Chicago	Franklin Field; Philadelphia, PA	W 41–0		
November 3	at Harvard	Soldiers' Field; Cambridge, MA (rivalry)	L 5–17	17,000	
November 10	Lafayette	Franklin Field; Philadelphia, PA	W 12–5		
November 17	Carlisle	Franklin Field; Philadelphia, PA	W 16–6	18,000	
November 21	at Navy	Worden Field; Annapolis, MD	W 28–6		
November 29	Cornell	Franklin Field; Philadelphia, PA (rivalry)	W 27–0		
