= 1900 Amherst football team =

American college football season

1900 Amherst football
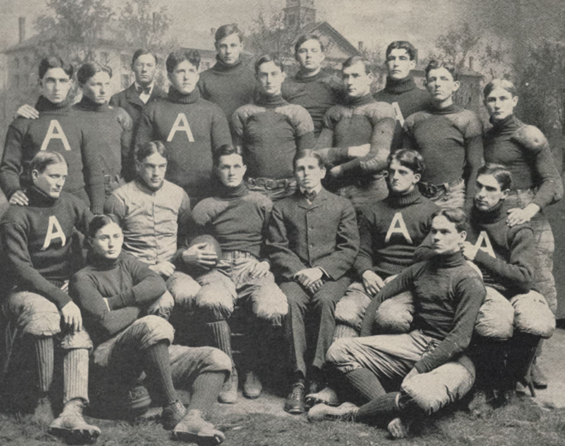
- Conference: Triangular Football League
- Record: 4–7–1 (0–2 TFL)
- Head coach: None
- Captain: W. D. Ballantine
- Home stadium: Pratt Field

1900 Triangular Football League standings
	Conf.					Overall
Team	W		L		T	W		L		T
Wesleyan $	2	–	0	–	0	5	–	4	–	0
Williams	1	–	1	–	0	6	–	4	–	1
Amherst	0	–	2	–	0	4	–	7	–	1
$ – Conference champion

The 1900 Amherst football team represented Amherst College as a member of the Triangular Football League during the 1900 college football season. Amherst compiled an overall record of 4–7–1 with a mark of 0–2 in conference play, placing last out of three teams in the TFL. The team played home games at Pratt Field in Amherst, Massachusetts.

== Schedule ==
Date	Time	Opponent	Site	Result	Attendance	Source
September 29		Williston Seminary*	Pratt Field; Amherst, MA	W 23–0		
October 3		at Yale*	Yale Field; New Haven, CT	L 0–27	1,500	
October 6		Trinity (CT)*	Pratt Field; Amherst, MA	T 0–0		
October 10	4:00 p.m.	at Harvard*	Soldiers' Field; Boston, MA	L 0–18	800	
October 13		Worcester Tech*	Pratt Field; Amherst, MA	W 39–0		
October 20	2:00 p.m.	at Syracuse*	University Oval; Syracuse, NY	L 0–5	1,200	
October 24		Bowdoin*	Pratt Field; Amherst, MA	L 6–11		
October 31		Tufts*	Pratt Field; Amherst, MA	L 0–11		
November 3		MIT*	Pratt Field; Amherst, MA	W 18–0		
November 10		Williams	Pratt Field; Amherst, MA (rivalry)	L 5–16		
November 17		Massachusetts*	Pratt Field; Amherst, MA	W 18–0		
November 24		at Wesleyan	Andrus Field; Middletown, CT	L 0–17	1,000	
*Non-conference game
