= 1900 college football season =

American college football season

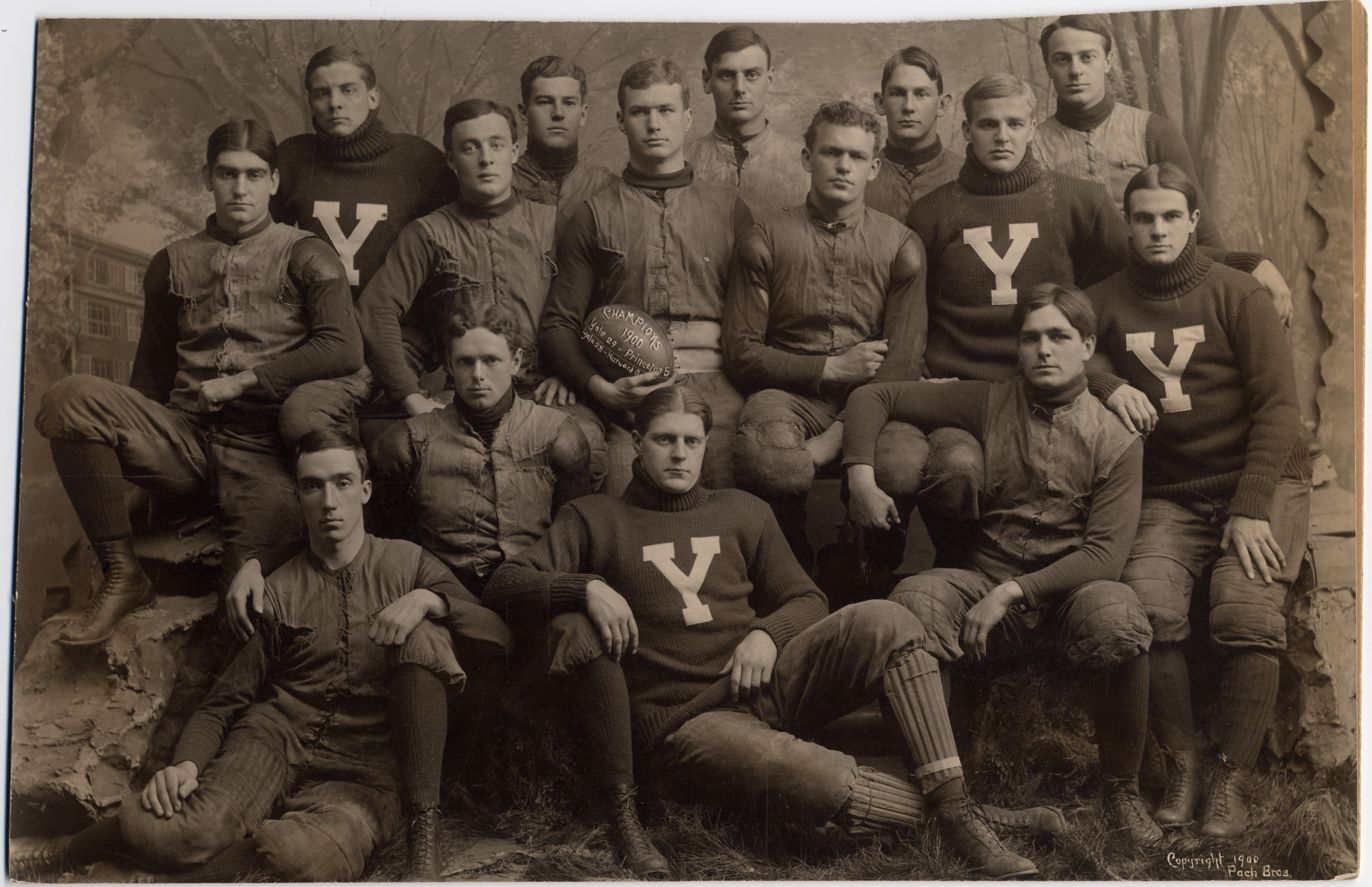
- Yale Bulldogs
- Total No. of teams: 41
- Regular season: September 14 to December 8
- Champion: Yale

The 1900 college football season ended with the Official NCAA Division I Football Records Book listing Yale as having been selected national champions.

== Conference and program changes ==
- The Intercollegiate Conference of Faculty Representatives, commonly known as the Western Conference and the precursor to the modern Big Ten Conference, added two new members, Indiana and Iowa, to increase its membership to nine. It was after this expansion that the conference first gained the unofficial moniker Big Nine Conference.

| School | 1899 Conference | 1900 Conference |
|---|---|---|
| Indiana Hoosiers | Independent | Big Nine (Western) |
| Iowa Hawkeyes | Independent | Big Nine (Western) |

== Conference standings ==
=== Major conference standings ===
1900 Colorado Football Association standings
| | Conf. | | | | | Overall |
| Team | W | | L | | T | W | | L | | T |
|---|---|---|---|---|---|---|---|---|---|---|
| Colorado College $ | 3 | – | 0 | – | 0 | 6 | – | 2 | – | 0 |
| Colorado Mines | 2 | – | 1 | – | 0 | 4 | – | 3 | – | 0 |
| Colorado | 1 | – | 2 | – | 0 | 6 | – | 4 | – | 0 |
| Colorado Agricultural | 0 | – | 3 | – | 0 | 1 | – | 3 | – | 0 |
$ – Conference champion

1900 Southern Intercollegiate Athletic Association football standings
| | Conf. | | | | | Overall |
| Team | W | | L | | T | W | | L | | T |
|---|---|---|---|---|---|---|---|---|---|---|
| Clemson + | 2 | – | 0 | – | 0 | 6 | – | 0 | – | 0 |
| Auburn | 4 | – | 0 | – | 0 | 4 | – | 0 | – | 0 |
| Tulane | 3 | – | 0 | – | 0 | 5 | – | 0 | – | 0 |
| Texas | 1 | – | 0 | – | 0 | 6 | – | 0 | – | 0 |
| Sewanee + | 5 | – | 0 | – | 1 | 6 | – | 1 | – | 1 |
| North Carolina | 3 | – | 0 | – | 1 | 4 | – | 1 | – | 3 |
| Vanderbilt | 2 | – | 3 | – | 1 | 4 | – | 4 | – | 1 |
| Alabama | 1 | – | 3 | – | 0 | 2 | – | 3 | – | 0 |
| Nashville | 1 | – | 3 | – | 0 | 2 | – | 3 | – | 0 |
| Georgia | 1 | – | 4 | – | 0 | 2 | – | 4 | – | 0 |
| Tennessee | 0 | – | 2 | – | 1 | 3 | – | 2 | – | 1 |
| Cumberland (TN) | 0 | – | 1 | – | 0 | 0 | – | 1 | – | 0 |
| LSU | 0 | – | 1 | – | 0 | 2 | – | 2 | – | 0 |
| Kentucky State | 0 | – | 2 | – | 0 | 4 | – | 6 | – | 0 |
| Ole Miss | 0 | – | 3 | – | 0 | 0 | – | 3 | – | 0 |
| Georgia Tech | 0 | – | 3 | – | 0 | 0 | – | 4 | – | 0 |
$ – Conference champion

1900 Triangular Football League standings
| | Conf. | | | | | Overall |
| Team | W | | L | | T | W | | L | | T |
|---|---|---|---|---|---|---|---|---|---|---|
| Wesleyan $ | 2 | – | 0 | – | 0 | 5 | – | 4 | – | 0 |
| Williams | 1 | – | 1 | – | 0 | 6 | – | 4 | – | 1 |
| Amherst | 0 | – | 2 | – | 0 | 4 | – | 7 | – | 1 |
$ – Conference champion

1900 Western Conference football standings
| | Conf. | | | | | Overall |
| Team | W | | L | | T | W | | L | | T |
|---|---|---|---|---|---|---|---|---|---|---|
| Minnesota + | 3 | – | 0 | – | 1 | 10 | – | 0 | – | 2 |
| Iowa + | 2 | – | 0 | – | 1 | 7 | – | 0 | – | 1 |
| Wisconsin | 2 | – | 1 | – | 0 | 8 | – | 1 | – | 0 |
| Michigan | 3 | – | 2 | – | 0 | 7 | – | 2 | – | 1 |
| Northwestern | 2 | – | 1 | – | 2 | 7 | – | 2 | – | 3 |
| Chicago | 2 | – | 3 | – | 1 | 9 | – | 5 | – | 1 |
| Indiana | 1 | – | 2 | – | 1 | 4 | – | 2 | – | 2 |
| Illinois | 1 | – | 3 | – | 2 | 7 | – | 3 | – | 2 |
| Purdue | 0 | – | 4 | – | 0 | 4 | – | 4 | – | 0 |
+ – Conference co-champions

=== Independents ===
1900 Eastern college football independents records
| | Conf. | | | Overall |
| Team | W | L | T | W | | L | | T |
|---|---|---|---|---|---|---|---|---|
| Yale | | – | | 12 | – | 0 | – | 0 |
| Penn | | – | | 12 | – | 1 | – | 0 |
| Harvard | | – | | 10 | – | 1 | – | 0 |
| Cornell | | – | | 10 | – | 2 | – | 0 |
| Geneva | | – | | 5 | – | 1 | – | 1 |
| Lafayette | | – | | 9 | – | 2 | – | 0 |
| Syracuse | | – | | 7 | – | 2 | – | 1 |
| Princeton | | – | | 8 | – | 3 | – | 0 |
| Drexel | | – | | 5 | – | 2 | – | 0 |
| Fordham | | – | | 3 | – | 1 | – | 1 |
| Army | | – | | 7 | – | 3 | – | 1 |
| Brown | | – | | 7 | – | 3 | – | 1 |
| Columbia | | – | | 7 | – | 3 | – | 1 |
| Villanova | | – | | 5 | – | 2 | – | 2 |
| Washington & Jefferson | | – | | 6 | – | 3 | – | 1 |
| Swarthmore | | – | | 6 | – | 3 | – | 2 |
| Holy Cross | | – | | 5 | – | 3 | – | 1 |
| Carlisle | | – | | 6 | – | 4 | – | 1 |
| Buffalo | | – | | 3 | – | 2 | – | 2 |
| Western Univ. of Penn | | – | | 5 | – | 4 | – | 0 |
| Bucknell | | – | | 4 | – | 4 | – | 1 |
| Dickinson | | – | | 5 | – | 5 | – | 0 |
| Pittsburgh College | | – | | 3 | – | 3 | – | 1 |
| Rutgers | | – | | 4 | – | 4 | – | 0 |
| Vermont | | – | | 4 | – | 4 | – | 1 |
| Lehigh | | – | | 5 | – | 6 | – | 0 |
| Frankin & Marshall | | – | | 4 | – | 5 | – | 0 |
| Temple | | – | | 3 | – | 4 | – | 1 |
| Penn State | | – | | 4 | – | 6 | – | 1 |
| Amherst | | – | | 4 | – | 7 | – | 1 |
| Dartmouth | | – | | 2 | – | 4 | – | 2 |
| NYU | | – | | 3 | – | 6 | – | 1 |
| Tufts | | – | | 3 | – | 6 | – | 1 |
| Wesleyan | | – | | 3 | – | 6 | – | 1 |
| New Hampshire | | – | | 1 | – | 5 | – | 1 |
| Colgate | | – | | 2 | – | 8 | – | 0 |
| CCNY | | – | | 0 | – | 1 | – | 0 |

1900 Midwestern college football independents records
| | Conf. | | | Overall |
| Team | W | L | T | W | | L | | T |
|---|---|---|---|---|---|---|---|---|
| Central Michigan | | – | | 1 | – | 0 | – | 0 |
| Lake Forest | | – | | 1 | – | 0 | – | 0 |
| Haskell | | – | | 9 | – | 1 | – | 0 |
| North Dakota Agricultural | | – | | 8 | – | 1 | – | 1 |
| Ohio State | | – | | 8 | – | 1 | – | 1 |
| Nebraska | | – | | 6 | – | 1 | – | 1 |
| Beloit | | – | | 7 | – | 1 | – | 2 |
| Kirksville Osteopaths | | – | | 7 | – | 2 | – | 1 |
| Washburn | | – | | 6 | – | 2 | – | 0 |
| Wittenberg | | – | | 5 | – | 2 | – | 1 |
| Drake | | – | | 6 | – | 3 | – | 0 |
| Doane | | – | | 2 | – | 1 | – | 0 |
| Notre Dame | | – | | 6 | – | 3 | – | 1 |
| Fairmount | | – | | 5 | – | 3 | – | 0 |
| Detroit College | | – | | 3 | – | 2 | – | 0 |
| South Dakota Agricultural | | – | | 3 | – | 2 | – | 0 |
| Washington University | | – | | 3 | – | 2 | – | 1 |
| Carthage | | – | | 4 | – | 3 | – | 0 |
| Wabash | | – | | 5 | – | 4 | – | 0 |
| Lincoln (MO) | | – | | 2 | – | 2 | – | 0 |
| Missouri | | – | | 4 | – | 4 | – | 1 |
| Northern Illinois State | | – | | 2 | – | 2 | – | 2 |
| Iowa State Normal | | – | | 3 | – | 4 | – | 1 |
| Buchtel | | – | | 2 | – | 3 | – | 1 |
| Cincinnati | | – | | 3 | – | 5 | – | 1 |
| Ohio | | – | | 2 | – | 4 | – | 1 |
| Kansas State | | – | | 2 | – | 4 | – | 0 |
| Kansas | | – | | 2 | – | 5 | – | 2 |
| Ohio Wesleyan | | – | | 2 | – | 5 | – | 2 |
| Iowa State | | – | | 2 | – | 5 | – | 1 |
| Butler | | – | | 0 | – | 1 | – | 3 |
| Heidelberg | | – | | 0 | – | 2 | – | 2 |
| Chicago P&S | | – | | 1 | – | 3 | – | 0 |
| Mount Union | | – | | 1 | – | 4 | – | 1 |
| Miami (OH) | | – | | 0 | – | 4 | – | 0 |

1900 Southern college football independents records
| | Conf. | | | Overall |
| Team | W | L | T | W | | L | | T |
|---|---|---|---|---|---|---|---|---|
| Baylor | | – | | 3 | – | 0 | – | 0 |
| Davidson | | – | | 4 | – | 1 | – | 0 |
| Centre | | – | | 4 | – | 1 | – | 1 |
| Virginia | | – | | 7 | – | 2 | – | 1 |
| Georgetown | | – | | 5 | – | 1 | – | 3 |
| VMI | | – | | 4 | – | 1 | – | 2 |
| Oklahoma | | – | | 3 | – | 1 | – | 1 |
| Kendall | | – | | 2 | – | 1 | – | 0 |
| Marshall | | – | | 1 | – | 0 | – | 2 |
| Navy | | – | | 6 | – | 3 | – | 0 |
| Arkansas | | – | | 2 | – | 1 | – | 1 |
| South Carolina | | – | | 4 | – | 3 | – | 0 |
| West Virginia | | – | | 4 | – | 3 | – | 0 |
| VPI | | – | | 3 | – | 3 | – | 1 |
| Texas A&M | | – | | 2 | – | 2 | – | 1 |
| Richmond | | – | | 3 | – | 4 | – | 0 |
| Maryland | | – | | 3 | – | 4 | – | 1 |
| Delaware | | – | | 2 | – | 3 | – | 1 |
| William & Mary | | – | | 1 | – | 2 | – | 0 |
| North Carolina A&M | | – | | 1 | – | 5 | – | 0 |
| Furman | | – | | 0 | – | 2 | – | 1 |

1900 Far West college football independents records
| | Conf. | | | Overall |
| Team | W | L | T | W | | L | | T |
|---|---|---|---|---|---|---|---|---|
| Washington Agricultural | | – | | 4 | – | 0 | – | 1 |
| Idaho | | – | | 2 | – | 0 | – | 1 |
| Arizona | | – | | 3 | – | 1 | – | 0 |
| Stanford | | – | | 7 | – | 2 | – | 1 |
| Utah | | – | | 2 | – | 1 | – | 0 |
| California | | – | | 4 | – | 2 | – | 1 |
| Nevada State | | – | | 4 | – | 2 | – | 1 |
| Oregon | | – | | 3 | – | 3 | – | 1 |
| New Mexico A&M | | – | | 3 | – | 3 | – | 1 |
| San Jose Normal | | – | | 3 | – | 3 | – | 1 |
| Arizona Normal | | – | | 1 | – | 1 | – | 0 |
| USC | | – | | 1 | – | 1 | – | 1 |
| Wyoming | | – | | 3 | – | 3 | – | 0 |
| Washington | | – | | 1 | – | 2 | – | 2 |
| Montana | | – | | 0 | – | 1 | – | 0 |
| Utah Agricultural | | – | | 0 | – | 2 | – | 0 |

=== Minor conferences ===
| Conference | Champion(s) | Record |
|---|---|---|
| Michigan Intercollegiate Athletic Association | Albion | 5–0–1 |

== See also ==
- 1900 College Football All-America Team
