= List of Triangular Football League standings =

This is a list of yearly Triangular Football League standings.

== Triangular Football League standings ==
=== Northern Intercollegiate Football Association ===
1885 Northern Intercollegiate Football Association standings
	Conf.					Overall
Team	W		L		T	W		L		T
Williams $	6	–	1	–	0	6	–	1	–	0
Boston Tech	5	–	2	–	0	6	–	3	–	0
Tufts	2	–	4	–	0	2	–	4	–	0
Amherst	0	–	6	–	0	1	–	8	–	1
$ – Conference champion

1886 Northern Intercollegiate Football Association standings
	Conf.					Overall
Team	W		L		T	W		L		T
Williams $	4	–	1	–	1	5	–	2	–	1
Amherst	4	–	2	–	0	7	–	3	–	0
Boston Tech	2	–	2	–	1	2	–	7	–	1
Tufts	0	–	5	–	0	0	–	9	–	0
$ – Conference champion

=== Eastern Intercollegiate Football Association ===
1887 Eastern Intercollegiate Football Association standings
	Conf.					Overall
Team	W		L		T	W		L		T
Boston Tech $	4	–	0	–	0	5	–	3	–	0
Dartmouth	2	–	1	–	1	3	–	1	–	1
Trinity (CT)	2	–	2	–	0	3	–	3	–	1
Amherst	1	–	3	–	0	4	–	6	–	0
Stevens	0	–	3	–	1	0	–	6	–	1
$ – Conference champion

1888 Eastern Intercollegiate Football Association standings
	Conf.					Overall
Team	W		L		T	W		L		T
Boston Tech +	3	–	1	–	0	6	–	5	–	0
Dartmouth +	3	–	1	–	0	3	–	4	–	0
Williams	2	–	2	–	0	3	–	5	–	0
Stevens	1	–	2	–	0	2	–	7	–	1
Amherst	0	–	3	–	0	2	–	8	–	1
+ – Conference co-champions

1889 Eastern Intercollegiate Football Association standings
	Conf.					Overall
Team	W		L		T	W		L		T
Dartmouth $	4	–	0	–	0	7	–	1	–	0
Amherst	2	–	1	–	1	4	–	4	–	2
Williams	1	–	2	–	1	4	–	6	–	1
Boston Tech	1	–	3	–	0	2	–	6	–	0
Stevens	1	–	3	–	0	2	–	10	–	0
$ – Conference champion; Boston Tech defeated Amherst on October 26, 10–9, but Amherst protested the final touchdown of the game. At the conference's meeting on December 18, Amherst was awarded victory by a score of 9–6. Williams forfeited a game to Stevens that was scheduled to be played on November 25.

1890 Eastern Intercollegiate Football Association standings
	Conf.					Overall
Team	W		L		T	W		L		T
Williams $	4	–	0	–	0	8	–	2	–	0
Amherst	3	–	1	–	0	7	–	6	–	1
Dartmouth	1	–	2	–	0	4	–	4	–	0
Boston Tech	0	–	2	–	0	4	–	4	–	1
Bowdoin	0	–	3	–	0	4	–	4	–	0
$ – Conference champion

1891 Eastern Intercollegiate Football Association standings
	Conf.					Overall
Team	W		L		T	W		L		T
Williams $	3	–	0	–	1	8	–	2	–	1
Amherst	2	–	0	–	2	8	–	4	–	3
Dartmouth	2	–	1	–	1	2	–	2	–	1
Boston Tech	1	–	3	–	0	5	–	7	–	2
Stevens	0	–	4	–	0	3	–	7	–	0
$ – Conference champion

=== New England Intercollegiate Football Association / Triangular Football League ===
1892 New England Intercollegiate Football Association standings
	Conf.					Overall
Team	W		L		T	W		L		T
Amherst $	2	–	0	–	0	9	–	5	–	0
Dartmouth	1	–	1	–	0	5	–	3	–	0
Williams	0	–	2	–	0	4	–	7	–	0
$ – Conference champion

1893 Triangular Football League standings
	Conf.					Overall
Team	W		L		T	W		L		T
Dartmouth $	2	–	0	–	0	5	–	3	–	0
Williams	1	–	1	–	0	7	–	3	–	2
Amherst	0	–	2	–	0	7	–	6	–	1
$ – Conference champion

1894 Triangular Football League standings
	Conf.					Overall
Team	W		L		T	W		L		T
Dartmouth $	2	–	0	–	0	5	–	4	–	0
Williams	1	–	1	–	0	6	–	3	–	1
Amherst	0	–	2	–	0	7	–	5	–	1
$ – Conference champion

1895 Triangular Football League standings
	Conf.					Overall
Team	W		L		T	W		L		T
Dartmouth $	2	–	0	–	0	7	–	5	–	1
Amherst	1	–	1	–	0	6	–	5	–	0
Williams	0	–	2	–	0	4	–	5	–	0
$ – Conference champion

1896 Triangular Football League standings
	Conf.					Overall
Team	W		L		T	W		L		T
Dartmouth $	2	–	0	–	0	5	–	2	–	1
Amherst	1	–	1	–	0	3	–	6	–	1
Williams	0	–	2	–	0	6	–	4	–	1
$ – Conference champion

1897 Triangular Football League standings
	Conf.					Overall
Team	W		L		T	W		L		T
Dartmouth $	2	–	0	–	0	4	–	3	–	0
Amherst	0	–	1	–	1	2	–	6	–	2
Williams	0	–	1	–	1	1	–	7	–	1
$ – Conference champion

1898 Triangular Football League standings
	Conf.					Overall
Team	W		L		T	W		L		T
Dartmouth $	2	–	0	–	0	5	–	6	–	0
Amherst	1	–	1	–	0	4	–	5	–	1
Williams	0	–	2	–	0	3	–	8	–	0
$ – Conference champion

1899 Triangular Football League standings
	Conf.					Overall
Team	W		L		T	W		L		T
Wesleyan $	2	–	0	–	0	7	–	2	–	0
Williams	1	–	1	–	0	9	–	4	–	0
Amherst	0	–	2	–	0	4	–	7	–	1
$ – Conference champion

1900 Triangular Football League standings
	Conf.					Overall
Team	W		L		T	W		L		T
Wesleyan $	2	–	0	–	0	5	–	4	–	0
Williams	1	–	1	–	0	6	–	4	–	1
Amherst	0	–	2	–	0	4	–	7	–	1
$ – Conference champion

1901 Triangular Football League standings
	Conf.					Overall
Team	W		L		T	W		L		T
Williams $	2	–	0	–	0	6	–	4	–	0
Wesleyan	1	–	1	–	0	3	–	6	–	1
Amherst	0	–	2	–	0	4	–	6	–	2
$ – Conference champion
