= History of Dartmouth football under William Wurtenburg =

Head coach of the Dartmouth Big Green football program

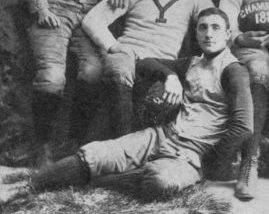
Between 1895 and 1899, William Wurtenburg coached the Dartmouth football program

From 1895 to 1899, William Wurtenburg served as the head coach of the Dartmouth football program, which represented Dartmouth College in collegiate football competitions. Dartmouth had adopted football as a school sport in 1881 when the team went 1–0–1. Prior to Wurtenburg's hiring, the team had won two consecutive Triangular Football League championships under coach Wallace Moyle. Wurtenburg had been a highly successful player at Yale, where he had played at quarterback on teams that went 46–1–1 in a four-year span. He had graduated from the school in 1893 and coached the Navy Midshipmen football program for a year before his hiring by Dartmouth.

During Wurtenburg's five year coaching tenure, Dartmouth went 8–2 in conference contests and won four consecutive Triangular Football League championships. The 1895 season was made up of thirteen games, a record-setting amount for a Dartmouth team. It included the closest loss to rival Harvard up to that point. The 1896 was the most successful season of Wurtenburg's, in terms of winning percentage; the squad went 5–2–1, the tenth-best record among major teams, for a .688 win percentage. The fewest games played in a season under Wurtenburg were seven in 1897. That team managed a 4–3 record, which included a three-game scoreless streak. The 1898 squad finished the season with a losing record, 5–6, but managed to outscore its opponents 205–137. Wurtenburg's final season as Dartmouth's head coach was his worst. The team had a 2–7 overall record and went 0–2 in conference play. The season was also marked by several of the largest blowouts of Dartmouth in years.

Overall, the Dartmouth football program went 23–23–2 in Wurtenburg's five years of coaching. The 1898 season was the final Triangular Football League championship the school would win; the conference would become defunct in 1901, two years later. Following Wurtenburg's departure, Frederick E. Jennings, a player under Wurtenburg, would take over the program, leading it to a 2–4–2 record in one year of coaching. Another former player, Walter McCornack would coach the program starting in 1901, and led the team to a 15-win record in two years. Wurtenburg's tenure as coach has occasionally been remarked as the beginning of Dartmouth's acceptance as a major team.

== Prelude ==
Dartmouth College fielded its first football team in 1881, when the school challenged Amherst College to a two-game series. They won the first contest, one touchdown to none, and tied the second. The following year, the team played their first major opponent when they traveled to Cambridge, Massachusetts and played the Harvard Crimson. Dartmouth was blown out 53–0, and a rivalry with Harvard formed. The Dartmouth football team developed through the 1880s, skipping the 1885 season but challenging several major opponents. Prior to Wurtenburg's arrival, the school had won four Triangular Football League championships in seven years. Wallace Moyle was the first coach hired by the program; he served in that position during the two years before Wurtenburg's appointment and led the school to a 9–7 record.

William Wurtenburg was born and raised in Western New York by immigrant parents. He was introduced to football while a student at Phillips Exeter Academy, where, in his senior year, he played quarterback and served as team captain. In 1886, Wurtenburg entered Yale University to study to become a doctor. He joined the school football team in his first year, playing as a backup halfback. He remained a backup halfback on the 1887 team, which went undefeated and was later recognized as a national champion. Wurtenburg transitioned to the quarterback position in 1888 and took the starting spot. He finished playing with the team regularly in 1889. During the time Wurtenburg played, Yale went 46–1–1. Upon graduating from Yale in 1893, Wurtenburg accepted a position as head coach of the Naval Academy football team for the 1894 season. He guided the team to a 4–1–2 record.

== Aftermath ==
After the 1899 season concluded, Wurtenburg declined to return the next year. Instead, he was replaced by one of his former players, Frederick E. Jennings. During the time that Wurtenburg coached Dartmouth, the program went 23–23–2 and won four consecutive Triangular Football League championships. The team had also amassed an 8–2 conference record. Jennings took the 1900 squad to a 2–4–2 record, and was replaced following that season by Walter McCornack. He found more success with the program and led it to a 15–3–1 record over two years. The Big Green would never win another Triangular Football League championship; the conference folded after the 1901 season. Following his coaching career, Wurtenburg became an occasional referee for Yale, and later established himself as a respected surgeon. Fred Crolius, captain of the 1898 team, would reflect on Wurtenburg's coaching career at Dartmouth for William "Big Bill" Edwards' book Football Days, stating that:

One man, whose influence more than any other one thing, succeeded in laying a foundation for Dartmouth's wonderful results, but whose name is seldom mentioned in that connection is Doctor Wurtenberg, who was brought up in the early Yale football school. He had the keenest sense of fundamental football and the greatest intensity of spirit in transmitting his hard earned knowledge. Four critical years he worked with us filling every one with his enthusiasm and those four years Dartmouth football gained such headway that nothing could stop its growth.
