= 1896 Dartmouth football team =

American college football season

1896 Dartmouth football

TFL champion
- Conference: Triangular Football League
- Record: 5–2–1 (2–0 TFL)
- Head coach: William Wurtenburg (2nd season)
- Captain: Walter McCornack

1896 Triangular Football League standings
	Conf.					Overall
Team	W		L		T	W		L		T
Dartmouth $	2	–	0	–	0	5	–	2	–	1
Amherst	1	–	1	–	0	3	–	6	–	1
Williams	0	–	2	–	0	6	–	4	–	1
$ – Conference champion

The 1896 Dartmouth football team represented Dartmouth College as a member of the Triangular Football League (TFL) during the 1896 college football season. Led by second-year head coach William Wurtenburg, Dartmouth compiled an overall record of 5–2–1 with a mark of 2–0 in TFL play, winning the league title.

The number of games played in 1896 was reduced from the previous season, down to a more normal level of eight. One notable absence from the 1896 schedule was a game against rival Harvard, the only time during Wurtenburg's tenure that the Crimson were not played. The 1896 season was also the most successful, winning percentage-wise during Wurtenburg's time as coach; the team finished the year with a .688 win percentage. Following an initial win against the Worcester Athletic Association, the squad suffered back-to-back shutout losses to Yale and Penn. The remainder of the season, however, was highly successful for the team, and they went 4–0–1 in their final five games. This included defeating both TFL opponents by a combined score of 42–0 for a fourth consecutive championship, and a tie with the Brown team they had lost to the previous year.

Walter McCornack was the team's captain. Several members of the team later became college football coaches, including McCornack, Frank Cavanaugh, John B. Eckstorm, David C. MacAndrew, Joseph H. Edwards, Fred Crolius, and Charles J. Boyle.

== Schedule ==
Date	Time	Opponent	Site	Result	Attendance	Source
October 3		at Worcester Athletic Association*	Worcester, MA	W 30–0		
October 10	3:37 p.m.	at Penn*	Franklin Field; Philadelphia, PA	L 0–16	4,000	
October 17		at Yale*	Yale Field; New Haven, CT	L 0–42		
October 28		Bowdoin*	Hanover, NH	W 28–10	500	
November 3		at Brown*	Adelaide Park; Providence, RI	T 10–10	1,000	
November 14		at Amherst	Pratt Field; Amherst, MA	W 32–0		
November 21	3:00 p.m.	Williams	Hanover, NH	W 10–0	800	
November 26		at Newton Athletic Association*	N. A. A. grounds; Newton, MA	W 12–6	2,500	
*Non-conference game
