= 1887 Dartmouth football team =

American college football season

1887 Dartmouth football
- Conference: Eastern Intercollegiate Football Association
- Record: 3–1–1 (2–1–1 EIFA)
- Head coach: None
- Captain: William Odlin

1887 Eastern Intercollegiate Football Association standings
	Conf.					Overall
Team	W		L		T	W		L		T
Boston Tech $	4	–	0	–	0	5	–	3	–	0
Dartmouth	2	–	1	–	1	3	–	1	–	1
Trinity (CT)	2	–	2	–	0	3	–	3	–	1
Amherst	1	–	3	–	0	4	–	6	–	0
Stevens	0	–	3	–	1	0	–	6	–	1
$ – Conference champion

The 1887 Dartmouth football team represented Dartmouth College as a member of the Eastern Intercollegiate Football Association (EIFA) during the 1887 college football season. Dartmouth compiled an overall record of 3–1–1 with a mark of 2–1–1 in conference play, placing second in the EIFA.

== Schedule ==
Date	Time	Opponent	Site	Result	Source
October 19		at Tufts*	Medford, MA	W 52–0	
October 25		at Stevens	St. George's Cricket Grounds; Hoboken, NJ	T 4–4	
October 26	3:06 p.m.	at Boston Tech	Union Grounds; Boston, MA	L 15–24	
November 9		Amherst	Hanover, NH	W 52–0	
November 19	2:35 p.m.	Trinity (CT)	Hanover, NH	W 64–0	
*Non-conference game
