= Robert P. Wilson =

American college football player and coach (1875–1959)

Biographical details
- Born: April 16, 1875; Middletown, Connecticut, U.S.
- Died: December 20, 1959 (aged 84); Middletown, Connecticut, U.S.

Playing career
- 1895–1896: Wesleyan
- 1899: Columbia
- Position: Quarterback

Coaching career (HC unless noted)
- 1898–1902: Wesleyan
- 1903: NYU

Head coaching record
- Overall: 27–26–2

Accomplishments and honors

Championships
- 2 TFL (1899–1900)

Robert Paddock "Bert" Wilson (April 16, 1875 – December 20, 1959) was an American college football player and coach. He played football for Wesleyan University and was captain of the school's football team in 1896. After graduating, he served as Wesleyan's first head football coach from 1898 to 1902. In five years as Wesleyan's coach, Wilson compiled a record of 25–21–2. In his first two years as the coach, Wesleyan compiled records of 7–3 and 7–2. In the 17 years before Wilson took over as the coach, Wesleyan's football team had never won seven games in a single season. Wilson also attended Columbia University, where he played football as a quarterback and was captain of the 1899 Columbia Blue and White football team. In 1903, Wilson became the head football coach at New York University (NYU). He served the sixth head football coach at NYU and held that position for one season, in 1903, leading the NYU Violets to a record of 2–5.

Wilson was born in Middletown, Connecticut. He later worked as an architect in New York City before retiring in 1931. Wilson died on December 20, 1959, at his home in Middletown.

== Head coaching record ==
Year	Team	Overall	Conference	Standing	Bowl/playoffs
Wesleyan Methodists (Independent) (1898)
1898	Wesleyan	7–3			
Wesleyan Methodists (Triangular Football League) (1899–1901)
1899	Wesleyan	7–2	2–0	1st	
1900	Wesleyan	5–4	2–0	1st	
1901	Wesleyan	3–6–1	1–1	2nd	
Wesleyan Methodists (Independent) (1902)
1902	Wesleyan	3–6–1			
Wesleyan:		25–21–2	5–1		
NYU Violets (Independent) (1903)
1903	NYU	2–5			
NYU:		2–5			
Total:		27–26–2			
National championship Conference title Conference division title or championship game berth
