= Eckstorm =

Eckstorm is a surname.

Notable people with this surname include:

- Fannie Hardy Eckstorm (1865–1946), American writer, ornithologist and folklorist
- John B. Eckstorm (1873–1964), American football player and coach
