= Fred W. Murphy =

American football player, coach, official, and lawyer (1877–1937)

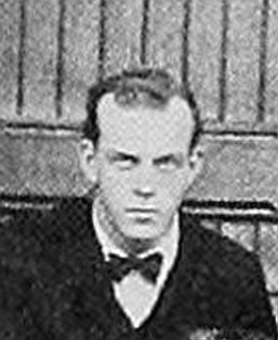
- Murphy pictured in the 1899 Massachusetts Agricultural football team photo

Biographical details
- Born: November 6, 1877; Dover, New Hampshire, U.S.
- Died: January 22, 1937 (aged 59); Brooklyn, New York, U.S.

Playing career
- 1895–1898: Brown
- Position: End

Coaching career (HC unless noted)
- 1899: Amherst
- 1899–1900: Massachusetts
- 1899: Brown (assistant)
- 1900–1901: Missouri
- 1903: Brown (assistant)
- 1904: Phillips Exeter (NH)
- 1910: Phillips Exeter (NH)

Head coaching record
- Overall: 22–25–2 (college)

Frederick William Murphy (November 6, 1877 – January 22, 1937) was an American football player, coach, official, and lawyer. He served as the head football coach at Amherst College in 1899, Massachusetts Agricultural College—now the University of Massachusetts Amherst—from 1899 to 1900, and the University of Missouri from 1900 to 1901.

== Biography ==
Murphy was born on November 6, 1877, in Dover, New Hampshire. He attended Brockton High School, where he played football. Murphy then went to Brown University, where he played on football team as an end from 1895 to 1898. He captained the 1898 Brown Bears football team as a senior. In 1899, Murphy coached the football team at Amherst College. In late November of that year, he returned to Brown to assist Edward N. Robinson in coaching the 1899 Brown football team for the remainder of the season. After coaching at Missouri, Murphy returned to Brown once more, in 1903, as an assistant football coach under Dave Fultz. In 1904 and 1910, Murphy was the head football coach at Phillips Exeter Academy.

Murphy graduated from Harvard Law School in 1904. He and Fultz formed a law partnership in New York City in 1906. The two also officiated major college football games together. Murphy died on January 22, 1937, at St. John's Hospital in Brooklyn, New York.

== Head coaching record ==
=== College ===
Year	Team	Overall	Conference	Standing	Bowl/playoffs
Amherst (Triangular Football League) (1899)
1899	Amherst	4–7	0–2	3rd	
Amherst:		4–7	0–2		
Massachusetts Aggies (Independent) (1899–1900)
1899	Massachusetts	7–3			
1900	Massachusetts	5–5			
Massachusetts:		12–8			
Missouri Tigers (Independent) (1900–1901)
1900	Missouri	4–4–1			
1901	Missouri	2–6–1			
Missouri:		6–10–2			
Total:		22–25–2			
