= 1897 Dartmouth football team =

American college football season

1897 Dartmouth football
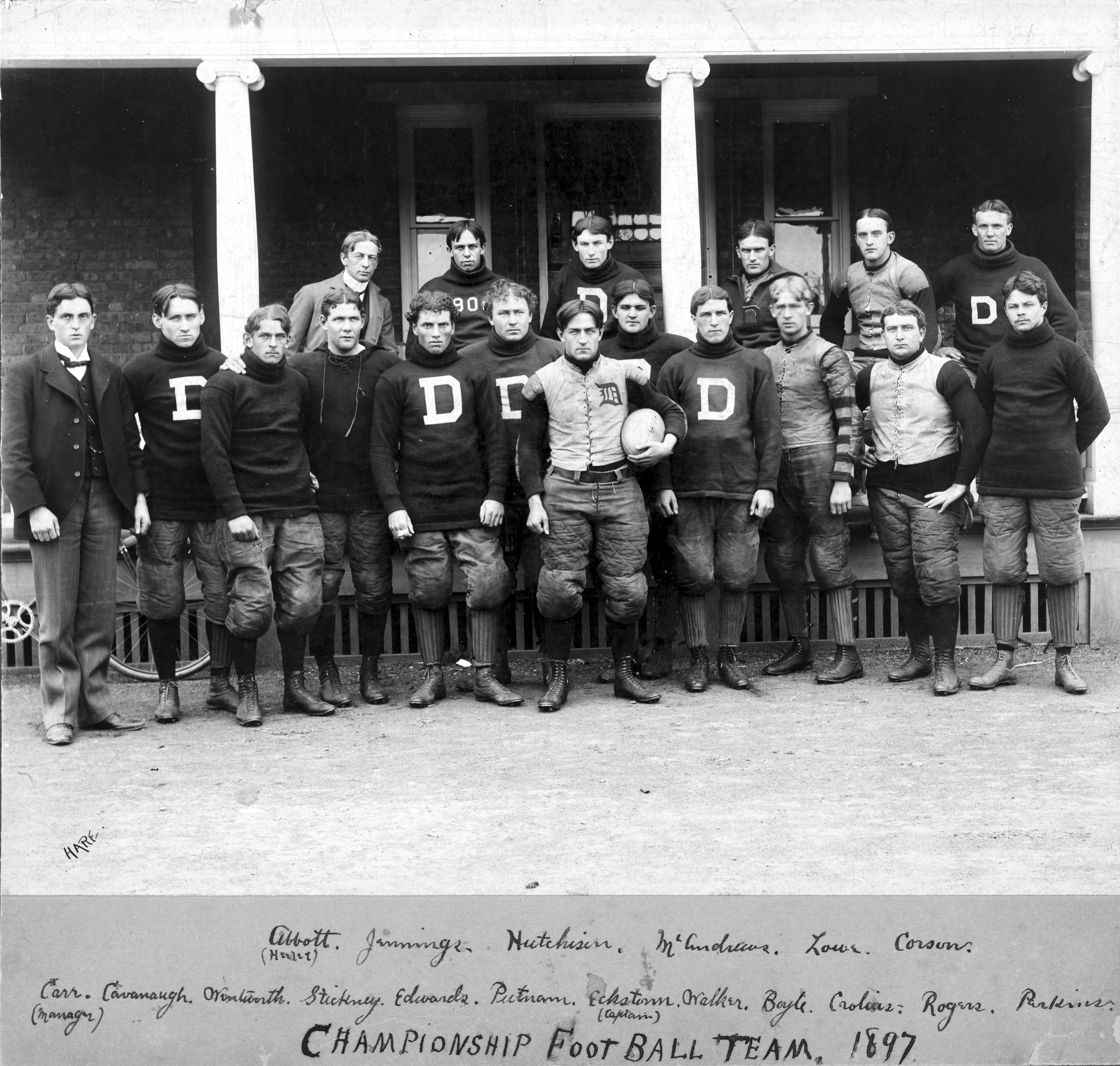

TFL champion
- Conference: Triangular Football League
- Record: 4–3 (2–0 TFL)
- Head coach: William Wurtenburg (3rd season)
- Captain: John B. Eckstorm
- Home stadium: Alumni Oval

1897 Triangular Football League standings
	Conf.					Overall
Team	W		L		T	W		L		T
Dartmouth $	2	–	0	–	0	4	–	3	–	0
Amherst	0	–	1	–	1	2	–	6	–	2
Williams	0	–	1	–	1	1	–	7	–	1
$ – Conference champion

The 1897 Dartmouth football team represented Dartmouth College in the 1897 college football season.

Dartmouth played only seven games during the 1897 season, the fewest of any year under head coach William Wurtenburg. The squad completed the year with a mediocre 4–3 record. Despite going 2–0 in conference games, the team lost three consecutive games in major shutouts. The season began with a shutout of Phillips Exeter Academy, but quickly turned for the worse. Harvard returned to Dartmouth's schedule and defeated them 13–0. The loss was followed by blowout defeats by Penn and Princeton, with Dartmouth losing by combined score of 64–0. The squad took a week-long break, which allowed them to recover and defeat conference opponents Amherst and Williams by more than fifty points in each game to win a fifth consecutive championship. As with the previous year, the season concluded with a defeat of the Newton Athletic Club.

Several members of the team would later become college football coaches, including John B. Eckstorm, Joseph Wentworth, Frank Cavanaugh, David Carr MacAndrew, Joseph H. Edwards, Fred Crolius, and Charles J. Boyle.

== Schedule ==
Date	Time	Opponent	Site	Result	Attendance	Source
October 2		Phillips Exeter Academy*	Alumni Oval; Hanover, NH	W 34–0		
October 9		at Harvard*	Soldiers' Field; Boston, MA (rivalry)	L 0–13	5,000	
October 16	3:21 p.m.	at Penn*	Franklin Field; Philadelphia, PA	L 0–34	5,000	
October 30	3:10 p.m.	at Princeton*	Osborne Field; Princeton, NJ	L 0–30	2,000	
November 13		Amherst	Hanover, NH	W 54–0		
November 20		at Williams	Weston Field; Williamstown, MA	W 52–0		
November 25		at Newton Athletic Club*	Newton A. C. grounds; Newton, MA	W 24–0		
*Non-conference game
