= 1892 Dartmouth football team =

American college football season

1892 Dartmouth football
- Conference: New England Intercollegiate Football Association
- Record: 5–3 (1–1 NEIFA)
- Head coach: None

1892 New England Intercollegiate Football Association standings
	Conf.					Overall
Team	W		L		T	W		L		T
Amherst $	2	–	0	–	0	9	–	5	–	0
Dartmouth	1	–	1	–	0	5	–	3	–	0
Williams	0	–	2	–	0	4	–	7	–	0
$ – Conference champion

The 1892 Dartmouth football team represented Dartmouth College as a member of the New England Intercollegiate Football Association (NEIFA) the 1892 college football season. Dartmouth compiled an overall record of 5–3 with a mark of 1–1 in conference play, placing second in the NEIFA.

== Schedule ==
Date	Time	Opponent	Site	Result	Attendance	Source
October 1		at Harvard*	Jarvis Field; Cambridge, MA (rivalry)	L 0–48		
October 8		Springfield YMCA*	Hanover, NH	W 10–8		
October 14		at Phillips Academy*	Andover, MA	W 22–0	400	
October 15		at Boston Athletic Association*	South End Grounds; Boston, MA	L 8–30	250	
October 22		at Wesleyan*	Middletown, CT	W 20–8	600	
October 26	12:35 p.m.	Tufts*	Hanover, NH	W 12–10	800	
November 5		Williams	Hanover, NH	W 24–12	1,000	
November 12		at Amherst	Pratt Field; Amherst, MA	L 2–30	1,000	
*Non-conference game
