= Josiah J. Hazen =

American football player and coach (1871–1948)

Biographical details
- Born: December 11, 1871; Haddam, Connecticut, U.S.
- Died: October 20, 1948 (aged 76); Middletown, Connecticut, U.S.

Playing career
- 1897–1898: Yale
- 1899: Williams
- 1901–1902: Williams

Coaching career (HC unless noted)
- 1899: Williams
- 1901: Williams

Head coaching record
- Overall: 15–8

Accomplishments and honors

Championships
- 1 Triangular Football League (1901)

Awards
- Second-team All-American (1897)

Josiah Judson Hazen (December 11, 1871 – October 20, 1948) was an American college football player and coach. He served as a player-coach at Williams College in 1899 and 1901, compiling a record of 15–8. Hazen died on October 20, 1948, at Middlesex Hospital in Middletown, Connecticut.

== Head coaching record ==
Year	Team	Overall	Conference	Standing	Bowl/playoffs
Williams Ephs (Triangular Football League) (1899)
1899	Williams	9–4	1–1	2nd	
Williams Ephs (Triangular Football League) (1901)
1901	Williams	6–4	2–0	1st	
Williams:		15–8	3–1		
Total:		15–8			
National championship Conference title Conference division title or championship game berth
