= 1887 Stevens football team =

American college football season

1887 Stevens football
- Conference: Eastern Intercollegiate Football Association
- Record: 0–6–1 (0–3–1 EIFA)
- Head coach: None
- Home stadium: St. George's Cricket Grounds

1887 Eastern Intercollegiate Football Association standings
	Conf.					Overall
Team	W		L		T	W		L		T
Boston Tech $	4	–	0	–	0	5	–	3	–	0
Dartmouth	2	–	1	–	1	3	–	1	–	1
Trinity (CT)	2	–	2	–	0	3	–	3	–	1
Amherst	1	–	3	–	0	4	–	6	–	0
Stevens	0	–	3	–	1	0	–	6	–	1
$ – Conference champion

The 1887 Stevens football team represented Stevens Institute of Technology as a member of the Eastern Intercollegiate Football Association (EIFA) during the 1887 college football season. Stevens compiled an overall record of 0–6–1 with a mark of 0–3–1 in conference play, placing last out of five teams in the EIFA. The team played home games at St. George's Cricket Grounds in Hoboken, New Jersey.

== Schedule ==
Date	Time	Opponent	Site	Result	Source
October 8		at Rutgers*	New Brunswick, NJ	L 0–26	
October 19		Rutgers*	Hoboken, NJ	L 2–5	
October 25		Dartmouth	St. George's Cricket Grounds; Hoboken, NJ	T 4–4	
October 29		Active Football Club*	St. George's Cricket Grounds; Hoboken, NJ	L 4–10	
November 5		at Amherst	Blake Field; Amherst, MA	L 6–16	
November 12	2:45 p.m.	at Trinity (CT)	Ward Street grounds; Hartford, CT	L 0–26	
November 19		Boston Tech	St. George's Cricket Grounds; Hoboken, NJ	L 0–20	
*Non-conference game
