= Wallace Moyle =

American football player and coach (1867–1920)

Biographical details
- Born: May 14, 1867; Plymouth, England
- Died: September 20, 1920 (aged 53); West Haven, Connecticut, U.S.

Playing career
- 1890: Yale
- Position: End

Coaching career (HC unless noted)
- 1891–1892: Lafayette
- 1893–1894: Dartmouth
- 1895–1897: Brown

Head coaching record
- Overall: 34–38–3

Accomplishments and honors

Championships
- 2 Triangular Football League (1893–1894)

Wallace Simon Moyle (May 14, 1867 – September 10, 1920) was an American college football player and coach. He served as the head coach at Lafayette, Dartmouth, and Brown.

Moyle attended Yale University, where he played football as an end. He graduated in 1891, and then took over as the head football coach at Lafayette College. Moyle served in that position for two years and amassed a record of 7–16–1. In 1893, Moyle became the first "all-season head coach" at Dartmouth College and posted a 9–7 record during his two-year tenure. The Indians' losses to Harvard, 16–0, and Yale, 28–0, were seen as evidence of improvement under Moyle. By comparison, Yale had routed Dartmouth, 113–0, in 1884, which marked the beginning of the so-called "Yale jinx". Dartmouth was awarded the Triangular Football Conference championship in both years of Moyle's tenure. In 1895, Moyle moved on to Brown University, where he amassed an 18–15–2 record over three years as head coach.

== Head coaching record ==
Year	Team	Overall	Conference	Standing	Bowl/playoffs
Lafayette (Independent) (1891–1892)
1891	Lafayette	2–9–1			
1892	Lafayette	5–7			
Lafayette:		7–16–1			
Dartmouth (Triangular Football League) (1893–1894)
1893	Dartmouth	4–3	2–0	1st	
1894	Dartmouth	5–4	2–0	1st	
Dartmouth:		9–7	4–0		
Brown Bears (Independent) (1895–1897)
1895	Brown	7–6–1			
1896	Brown	4–5–1			
1897	Brown	7–4			
Brown:		18–15–2			
Total:		34–38–3			
National championship Conference title Conference division title or championship game berth
