= 1887 Amherst football team =

American college football season

1887 Amherst football
- Conference: Eastern Intercollegiate Football Association
- Record: 4–6 (1–3 EIFA)
- Head coach: None
- Captain: A. F. Stearns
- Home stadium: Blake Field

1887 Eastern Intercollegiate Football Association standings
	Conf.					Overall
Team	W		L		T	W		L		T
Boston Tech $	4	–	0	–	0	5	–	3	–	0
Dartmouth	2	–	1	–	1	3	–	1	–	1
Trinity (CT)	2	–	2	–	0	3	–	3	–	1
Amherst	1	–	3	–	0	4	–	6	–	0
Stevens	0	–	3	–	1	0	–	6	–	1
$ – Conference champion

The 1887 Amherst football team represented the Amherst College as a member of the Eastern Intercollegiate Football Association (EIFA) during the 1887 college football season. Amherst compiled an overall record of 4–6 with a mark of 1–3 in conference play, placing fourth in the EIFA. The team played home games at Blake Field in Amherst, Massachusetts.

== Schedule ==
Date	Time	Opponent	Site	Result	Attendance	Source
October 1		at Wesleyan*	Middletown, CT	L 0–34		
October 8		Williams*	Amherst, MA (rivalry)	L 0–54		
October 19		Williston Seminary*	Amherst, MA	W 44–0		
October 22		at Harvard*	Jarvis Field; Cambridge, MA	L 0–98		
October 25		Massachusetts*	Amherst, MA	W 10–0		
October 26		Boston University*	Blake Field; Amherst, MA	W 22–0		
October 29	3:00 p.m.	at Trinity (CT)	Ward Street grounds; Hartford, CT	L 6–22	500	
November 5		Stevens	Blake Field; Amherst, MA	W 16–6		
November 9		at Dartmouth	Hanover, NH	L 0–52		
November 12		Boston Tech	Blake Field; Amherst, MA	L 0–54		
*Non-conference game
