= 1900 Williams Ephs football team =

American college football season

1900 Williams Ephs football
- Conference: Triangular Football League
- Record: 6–4–1 (1–1 TFL)
- Head coach: None
- Home stadium: Weston Field

1900 Triangular Football League standings
	Conf.					Overall
Team	W		L		T	W		L		T
Wesleyan $	2	–	0	–	0	5	–	4	–	0
Williams	1	–	1	–	0	6	–	4	–	1
Amherst	0	–	2	–	0	4	–	7	–	1
$ – Conference champion

The 1900 Williams Ephs football team represented the Williams College as a member of the Triangular Football League (TFL) during the 1900 college football season. Williams compiled an overall record of 6–4–1 with a mark of 1–1 in conference play, placing second in the TFL. The team played home games at Weston Field in Williamstown, Massachusetts.

== Schedule ==
Date	Time	Opponent	Site	Result	Attendance	Source
September 29		at Laureates of Troy*	Weston Field; Williamstown, MA	W 10–0		
October 3	4:00 p.m.	at Harvard*	Soldiers' Field; Cambridge, MA	L 0–12	1,000	
October 6		RPI*	Weston Field; Williamstown, MA	W 12–0		
October 10		at Columbia*	Manhattan Field; New York, NY	T 0–0	3,000	
October 17		Massachusetts*	Weston Field; Williamstown, MA	W 5–0		
October 20		vs. Hamilton*	Ridgefield; Albany, NY	L 5–12		
October 27		at Army*	The Plain; West Point, NY	L 0–6		
October 31		Union (NY)*	Weston Field; Williamstown, MA	W 5–0		
November 3		at Holy Cross*	Worcester Oval; Worcester, MA	W 11–0		
November 10		at Amherst	Pratt Field; Amherst, MA (rivalry)	W 16–5		
November 17		Wesleyan*	Weston Field; Williamstown, MA	L 0–35		
*Non-conference game
