= Ward Street Grounds =

Former sports venue in Hartford, CT

Ward Street Grounds was a sports venue in Hartford, Connecticut which existed from 1883 to 1907. It was used primarily for baseball (both professional and amateur) and for college football.

The following minor league baseball teams played their home games here:

- Hartford – Connecticut State League (1884) / Southern New England League (1885) / Eastern League (1886–1887)
- Hartford – Atlantic Association (1889–1890)

Some notable college football teams staged games here:

- 1884 Yale Bulldogs football team
- 1885 Yale Bulldogs football team
- 1887 Trinity Bantams football team
- 1888 Yale Bulldogs football team

The grounds were located on a large block bounded by Ward Street (north); Broad Street (east); Lincoln Street (south); and Zion Hill Cemetery (west).

The first newspaper reference to the newly built ballpark discussed a local game scheduled for Jul 21, 1883.

By 1907, the local baseball and football teams had their own grounds, and the city announced that streets would be cut through the block.

The Immaculate Conception Church acquired part of the property and built a school there. Those buildings still stand. Other buildings on the property include commercial businesses.
