= 1895 Williams Ephs football team =

American college football season

1895 Williams Ephs football
- Conference: Triangular Football League
- Record: 4–5 (0–2 TFL)
- Head coach: None
- Home stadium: Weston Field

1895 Triangular Football League standings
	Conf.					Overall
Team	W		L		T	W		L		T
Dartmouth $	2	–	0	–	0	7	–	5	–	1
Amherst	1	–	1	–	0	6	–	5	–	0
Williams	0	–	2	–	0	4	–	5	–	0
$ – Conference champion

The 1895 Williams Ephs football team represented the Williams College as a member of the Triangular Football League (TFL) during the 1895 college football season. Williams compiled an overall record of 4–5 with a mark of 0–2 in conference play, placing last out of three teams in the TFL The team played home games at Weston Field in Williamstown, Massachusetts.

== Schedule ==
Date	Time	Opponent	Site	Result	Attendance	Source
September 28		Laureates of Troy*	Weston Field; Williamstown, MA	W 4–0		
October 5		Colgate*	Weston Field; Williamstown, MA	W 30–6		
October 16	4:00 p.m.	at Harvard*	Soldiers' Field; Cambridge, MA	L 0–32	1,000	
October 19		Syracuse*	Weston Field; Williamstown, MA	W 28–10	600	
October 23		at Yale*	Yale Field; New Haven, CT	L 0–54		
October 26		at Crescent Athletic Club*	Eastern Park; Brooklyn, NY	L 0–43	2,000	
November 2		at Amherst	Pratt Field; Amherst, MA (rivalry)	L 4–16	1,000	
November 9		vs. Union (NY)*	Ridgefield grounds; Albany, NY	W 14–6	2,000	
November 16		Dartmouth	Weston Field; Williamstown, MA	L 5–10	1,000	
*Non-conference game
