= 1885 Boston Tech football team =

American college football season

1885 Boston Tech football
- Conference: Northern Intercollegiate Football Association
- Record: 6–3 (5–2 Northern)
- Head coach: None
- Home stadium: Union Grounds

1885 Northern Intercollegiate Football Association standings
	Conf.					Overall
Team	W		L		T	W		L		T
Williams $	6	–	1	–	0	6	–	1	–	0
Boston Tech	5	–	2	–	0	6	–	3	–	0
Tufts	2	–	4	–	0	2	–	4	–	0
Amherst	0	–	6	–	0	1	–	8	–	1
$ – Conference champion

The 1885 Boston Tech football team represented Boston Tech—now known as the Massachusetts Institute of Technology (MIT)—as a member of the Northern Intercollegiate Football Association during the 1885 college football season. The team compiled an overall record of 6–3 with a mark of 5–2 in conference play, placing second in the Northern league. Boston Tech played home games at Union Grounds in Boston.

== Schedule ==
Date	Time	Opponent	Site	Result	Attendance	Source
October 24	2:03 p.m.	at Williams	Williamstown, MA	L 6–19		
October 28		Tufts	Union Grounds; Boston, MA	W 16–4		
October 31		Yale*	Union Grounds; Boston, MA	L 0–51	900	
November 4		at Newton Athletic Association*	Newtonville, MA	W 18–4		
November 7		Williams	Union Grounds; Boston, MA	W 14–0		
November 11		Tufts	Union Grounds; Boston, MA	W 110–0		
November 14	2:15 p.m.	Amherst	Union Grounds; Boston, MA	W 32–0		
November 21		at Amherst	Blake Field; Amherst, MA	W 74–0 or 80–0		
November 25	2:00 p.m.	vs. Williams	Hampden Park; Springfield, MA	L 10–18	200	
*Non-conference game
