= 1892 Amherst football team =

American college football season

1892 Amherst football
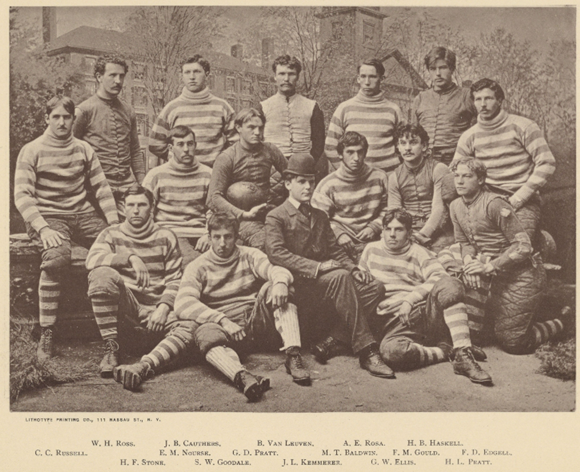

NEIFA champion
- Conference: New England Intercollegiate Football Association
- Record: 9–5 (2–0 NEIFA)
- Head coach: None
- Captain: George D. Pratt
- Home stadium: Pratt Field

1892 New England Intercollegiate Football Association standings
	Conf.					Overall
Team	W		L		T	W		L		T
Amherst $	2	–	0	–	0	9	–	5	–	0
Dartmouth	1	–	1	–	0	5	–	3	–	0
Williams	0	–	2	–	0	4	–	7	–	0
$ – Conference champion

The 1892 Amherst football team represented the Amherst College as a member of the New England Intercollegiate Football Association (NEIFA) during the 1892 college football season. Amherst compiled an overall record of 9–5 with a mark of 2–0 in conference play, winning the NEIFA title. The team played home games at Pratt Field in Amherst, Massachusetts.

== Schedule ==
Date	Time	Opponent	Site	Result	Attendance	Source
October 1		at Trinity (CT)*	Trinity grounds; Hartford, CT	W 26–0 or 28–0	300	
October 5		Massachusetts*	Pratt Field; Amherst, MA	W 58–10		
October 8	3:00 p.m.	at Harvard*	Jarvis Field; Cambridge, MA	L 0–26	1,500	
October 11		at Massachusetts*	Amherst, MA	W 4–0		
October 12		Trinity (CT)*	Pratt Field; Amherst, MA	W 21–8		
October 15		Boston Tech*	Pratt Field; Amherst, MA	W 14–0	400	
October 19		at Yale*	Yale Field; New Haven, CT	L 0–29	1,000–2,000	
October 22		Tufts*	Pratt Field; Amherst, MA	L 15–18		
October 25		Massachusetts*	Pratt Field; Amherst, MA	W 22–4		
October 29		at Harvard*	Jarvis Field; Cambridge, MA	L 10–32		
October 31		Troy Polytechnic*	Pratt Field; Amherst, MA	W 54–6		
November 5		at Boston Tech*	South End Grounds; Boston, MA	L 4–6	300	
November 12		Dartmouth	Pratt Field; Amherst, MA	W 30–2	1,000	
November 18		at Williams	Weston Field; Williamstown, MA (rivalry)	W 60–0	1,600	
*Non-conference game
