= 1885 Tufts Jumbos football team =

American college football season

1885 Tufts Jumbos football
- Conference: Northern Intercollegiate Football Association
- Record: 2–4 (2–4 Northern)
- Head coach: Fred P. Chapman (1st season)
- Captain: Fred P. Chapman

1885 Northern Intercollegiate Football Association standings
	Conf.					Overall
Team	W		L		T	W		L		T
Williams $	6	–	1	–	0	6	–	1	–	0
Boston Tech	5	–	2	–	0	6	–	3	–	0
Tufts	2	–	4	–	0	2	–	4	–	0
Amherst	0	–	6	–	0	1	–	8	–	1
$ – Conference champion

The 1885 Tufts Jumbos football team represented the Tufts College as a member of the Northern Intercollegiate Football Association during the 1885 college football season. The by Fred P. Chapman in his first and only season as head coach, the Jumbos compiled an overall record of 2–4 conference playing, placing third in the Northern league.

== Schedule ==
Date	Time	Opponent	Site	Result	Attendance	Source
October 17	3:15 p.m.	at Williams	Williamstown, MA	L 0–49		
October 24		at Amherst	Amherst, MA	W 22–10		
October 28		at Boston Tech	Union Grounds; Boston, MA	L 4–16		
November 6	2:00 p.m.	vs. Williams	Union Grounds; Boston, MA	L 0–28	200	
November 11		at Boston Tech	Union Grounds; Boston, MA	L 0–110		
November 13		vs. Amherst	Union Grounds; Boston, MA	W 8–5		
