= 1899 Williams Ephs football team =

American college football season

1899 Williams Ephs football
- Conference: Triangular Football League
- Record: 9–4 (1–1 TFL)
- Head coach: Josiah J. Hazen & Alfred H. Hine (1st season)
- Captain: Draper
- Home stadium: Weston Field

1899 Triangular Football League standings
	Conf.					Overall
Team	W		L		T	W		L		T
Wesleyan $	2	–	0	–	0	7	–	2	–	0
Williams	1	–	1	–	0	9	–	4	–	0
Amherst	0	–	2	–	0	4	–	7	–	1
$ – Conference champion

The 1899 Williams Ephs football team represented the Williams College as a member of the Triangular Football League (TFL) during the 1899 college football season. Led by first-year coaches Josiah J. Hazen and Alfred H. Hine, Williams compiled an overall record of 1–7–1 with a mark of 0–1–1 in conference play, placing second place in the TFL. The team played home games at Weston Field in Williamstown, Massachusetts.

== Schedule ==
Date	Time	Opponent	Site	Result	Attendance	Source
September 23		Laureates of Troy*	Weston Field; Williamstown, MA	W 10–0		
September 29		at Phillips Academy*	Andover, MA	W 10–0		
September 30	3:00 p.m.	at Harvard*	Soldiers' Field; Cambridge, MA	L 0–29		
October 7		at Cornell*	Percy Field; Ithaca, NY	L 0–12		
October 14		Union (NY)*	Weston Field; Williamstown, MA	W 12–5		
October 18		Holy Cross*	Weston Field; Williamstown, MA	W 23–5		
October 21		at Dartmouth*	Hanover, NH	W 12–10		
October 25		Trinity (CT)*	Weston Field; Williamstown, MA	W 12–0		
October 28		at Syracuse*	Syracuse, NY	W 6–0		
November 4		at Laureates of Troy*	Troy, NY	L 6–11	1,500	
November 11		Amherst	Weston Field; Williamstown, MA (rivalry)	W 38–0		
November 18		RPI	Weston Field; Williamstown, MA	W 26–10		
November 25		at Wesleyan	Andrus Field; Middletown, CT	L 5–11		
*Non-conference game
