= 1901 Wesleyan Methodists football team =

American college football season

1901 Wesleyan Methodists football
- Conference: Triangular Football League
- Record: 3–6–1 (1–1 TFL)
- Head coach: Robert P. Wilson (4th season)
- Home stadium: Andrus Field

1901 Triangular Football League standings
	Conf.					Overall
Team	W		L		T	W		L		T
Williams $	2	–	0	–	0	6	–	4	–	0
Wesleyan	1	–	1	–	0	3	–	6	–	1
Amherst	0	–	2	–	0	4	–	6	–	2
$ – Conference champion

The 1901 Wesleyan Methodists football team represented Wesleyan University as a member of the Triangular Football League (TFL) during the 1901 college football season. In their third season under head coach Robert P. Wilson, the Methodists compiled an overall record of 3–6–1 with a mark of 1–1 in conference play, placing second in the TFL. The team played home games at Andrus Field in Middletown, Connecticut.

== Schedule ==
Date	Opponent	Site	Result	Source
September 28	Tufts*	Andrus Field; Middletown, CT	L 0–5	
October 5	Springfield Training School*	Andrus Field; Middletown, CT	W 29–0	
October 9	at Yale*	Yale Field; New Haven, CT	L 0–24	
October 12	Massachusetts*	Andrus Field; Middletown, CT	L 0–6	
October 16	at Harvard*	Soldier's Field; Cambridge, MA	L 0–16	
October 26	Vermont*	Andrus Field; Middletown, CT	T 0–0	
November 2	at Dartmouth*	Alumni Oval; Hanover, NH	L 12–29	
November 9	at Williams	Williamstown, MA	L 5–11	
November 16	Trinity (CT)*	Andrus Field; Middletown, CT (rivalry)	W 11–0	
November 23	at Amherst	Pratt Field; Amherst, MA	W 15–11	
*Non-conference game
