= 1896 Williams Ephs football team =

American college football season

1896 Williams Ephs football
- Conference: Triangular Football League
- Record: 6–4–1 (0–2 TFL)
- Head coach: None
- Home stadium: Weston Field

1896 Triangular Football League standings
	Conf.					Overall
Team	W		L		T	W		L		T
Dartmouth $	2	–	0	–	0	5	–	2	–	1
Amherst	1	–	1	–	0	3	–	6	–	1
Williams	0	–	2	–	0	6	–	4	–	1
$ – Conference champion

The 1896 Williams Ephs football team represented the Williams College as a member of the Triangular Football League (TFL) during the 1896 college football season. Williams compiled an overall record of 6–4–1 with a mark of 0–2 in conference play, placing last out of three teams in the TFL. The team played home games at Weston Field in Williamstown, Massachusetts.

== Schedule ==
Date	Time	Opponent	Site	Result	Attendance	Source
September 26		Laureates of Troy*	Weston Field; Williamstown, MA	W 12–4		
October 2		at Phillips Academy*	Andover, MA	W 24–0		
October 3	3:30 p.m.	at Harvard*	Soldiers' Field; Cambridge, MA	L 0–6	3,000	
October 7		Wesleyan*	Weston Field; Williamstown, MA	W 6–0	800	
October 10		Colgate*	Weston Field; Williamstown, MA	W 4–0		
October 14		at Yale*	Yale Field; New Haven, CT	L 0–22		
October 17		vs. Syracuse*	Ridgefield grounds; Albany, NY	W 24–6		
October 24		Bowdoin*	Weston Field; Williamstown, MA	W 22–0	500	
October 31		Boston Athletic Association*	Weston Field; Williamstown, MA	Cancelled		
November 7		Amherst	Weston Field; Williamstown, MA (rivalry)	L 4–6	1,500	
November 14	2:30 p.m.	vs. Cornell*	Buffalo Athletic Field; Buffalo, NY	T 0–0	5,000	
November 21	3:00 p.m.	at Dartmouth	Hanover, NH	L 0–10	800	
*Non-conference game
