= 1896 Amherst football team =

American college football season

1896 Amherst football
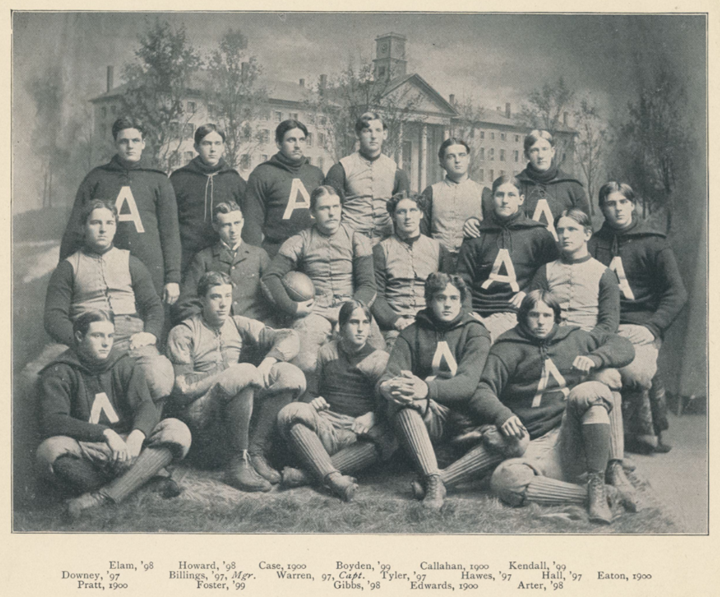
- Conference: Triangular Football League
- Record: 3–6–1 (1–1 TFL)
- Head coach: George A. Gray (2nd season)
- Captain: A. F. Warren
- Home stadium: Pratt Field

1896 Triangular Football League standings
	Conf.					Overall
Team	W		L		T	W		L		T
Dartmouth $	2	–	0	–	0	5	–	2	–	1
Amherst	1	–	1	–	0	3	–	6	–	1
Williams	0	–	2	–	0	6	–	4	–	1
$ – Conference champion

The 1896 Amherst football team represented Amherst College as a member of the Triangular Football League during the 1896 college football season. Led by George A. Gray in his second and final season as head coach, Amherst compiled an overall record of 3–6–1 with a mark of 1–1 in TFL play, placing second in the league. One of The team played home games at Pratt Field in Amherst, Massachusetts.

== Schedule ==
Date	Opponent	Site	Result	Attendance	Source
September 30	at Yale*	Yale Field; New Haven, CT	L 0–12		
October 7	Bowdoin*	Pratt Field; Amherst, MA	T 0–0		
October 10	at Brown*	Adelaide Park; Providence, RI	L 6–44	700–1,000	
October 17	at Wesleyan*	Wesleyan campus; Middletown, CT	L 0–6	200	
October 21	at Penn*	Franklin Field; Philadelphia, PA	L 0–14	800–2,000	
October 24	Worcester Tech*	Pratt Field; Amherst, MA	W 40–0		
October 28	Wesleyan*	Pratt Field; Amherst, MA	W 6–4	400	
October 31	Trinity (CT)*	Pratt Field; Amherst, MA	L 0–12		
November 7	at Williams	Weston Field; Williamstown, MA (rivalry)	W 6–4	1,500	
November 14	Dartmouth	Pratt Field; Amherst, MA	L 0–23		
*Non-conference game
