= 1900 Massachusetts Aggies football team =

American college football season

1900 Massachusetts Aggies football
- Conference: Athletic League of New England State Colleges
- Record: 5–5 ( Athletic League of New England State Colleges)
- Head coach: Fred W. Murphy (2nd season)
- Home stadium: Alumni Field

The 1900 Massachusetts Aggies football team represented Massachusetts Agricultural College in the 1900 college football season. The team was coached by Fred W. Murphy and played its home games at Alumni Field in Amherst, Massachusetts. The 1900 season was Brown's last as head coach of the Aggies. Massachusetts finished the season with a record of 5–5.

== Schedule ==
Date	Opponent	Site	Result	Source
September 22	at Holy Cross	Worcester College Grounds; Worcester, MA	L 0–6	
September 29	Worcester Academy	Alumni Field; Amherst, MA	W 12–0	
October 6	Norwich	Alumni Field; Amherst, MA	W 50–0	
October 13	at Wesleyan	Andrus Field; Middletown, CT	L 0–17	
October 17	at Williams	Weston Field; Williamstown, MA	L 0–5	
October 20	at Trinity (CT)	Jessee/Miller Field; Hartford, CT	L 0–23	
October 27	at Vermont	Burlington, VT	W 10–5	
November 3	at Connecticut	Athletic Fields; Storrs, CT (rivalry)	W 17–6	
November 10	at Worcester Tech	Worcester, MA	W 18–0	
November 17	at Amherst	Pratt Field; Amherst, MA	L 0–18	
