= 1893 Amherst football team =

American college football season

1893 Amherst football
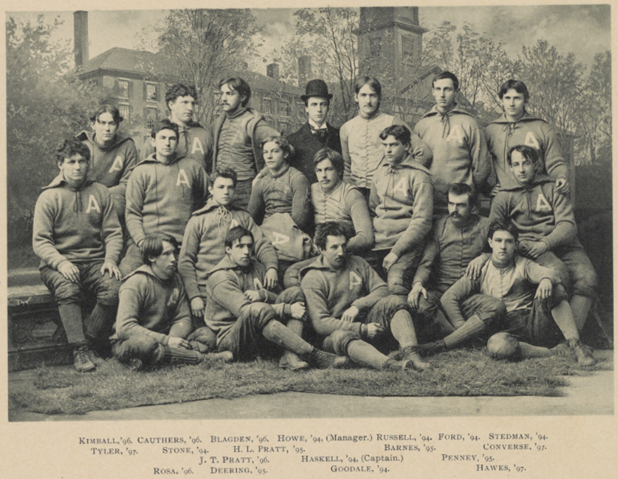
- Conference: Triangular Football League
- Record: 7–6–1 (0–2 TFL)
- Head coach: None
- Captain: Harris B. Haskell
- Home stadium: Pratt Field

1893 Triangular Football League standings
	Conf.					Overall
Team	W		L		T	W		L		T
Dartmouth $	2	–	0	–	0	5	–	3	–	0
Williams	1	–	1	–	0	7	–	3	–	2
Amherst	0	–	2	–	0	7	–	6	–	1
$ – Conference champion

The 1893 Amherst football team represented the Amherst College as a member of the Triangular Football League (TFL) during the 1893 college football season. Amherst compiled an overall record of 7–6–1 with a mark of 0–2 in conference play, placing last out of three teams in the TFL. The team played home games at Pratt Field in Amherst, Massachusetts.

== Schedule ==
Date	Time	Opponent	Site	Result	Attendance	Source
September 27		Greenfield Athletic Club*	Pratt Field; Amherst, MA	W 12–10		
September 30	3:00 p.m.	at Trinity (CT)*	Trinity grounds; Hartford, CT	T 14–14		
October 4		Massachusetts*	Pratt Field; Amherst, MA	W 26–0		
October 7	3:00 p.m.	at Harvard*	Jarvis Field; Cambridge, MA	L 0–32	3,000	
October 14		Boston Tech*	Pratt Field; Amherst, MA	W 14–6		
October 18	3:10 p.m.	at Yale*	Yale Field; New Haven, CT	L 0–52	700	
October 21	3:30 p.m.	at Army*	The Plain; West Point, NY	L 4–12	2,000	
October 25		Trinity (CT)*	Pratt Field; Amherst, MA	W 18–0		
October 28	3:30 p.m.	at Boston Athletic Association*	South End Grounds; Boston, MA	L 0–26	400–500	
October 30		Worcester Tech*	Pratt Field; Amherst, MA	W 34–4		
November 1		Massachusetts*	Pratt Field; Amherst, MA	W 16–2		
November 4		at Boston Tech*	South End Grounds; Boston, MA	W 12–4	200	
November 11	2:35 p.m.	at Dartmouth	Hanover, NH	L 0–34	2,000	
November 18	2:00 p.m.	Williams	Pratt Field; Amherst, MA (rivalry)	L 12–30	1,500	
*Non-conference game
