= 1892 Williams Ephs football team =

American college football season

1892 Williams Ephs football
- Conference: New England Intercollegiate Football Association
- Record: 4–7 (0–2 NEIFA)
- Head coach: None
- Home stadium: Weston Field

1892 New England Intercollegiate Football Association standings
	Conf.					Overall
Team	W		L		T	W		L		T
Amherst $	2	–	0	–	0	9	–	5	–	0
Dartmouth	1	–	1	–	0	5	–	3	–	0
Williams	0	–	2	–	0	4	–	7	–	0
$ – Conference champion

The 1892 Williams Ephs football team represented the Williams College as a member of the New England Intercollegiate Football Association (NEIFA) during the 1892 college football season. Williams compiled an overall record of 4–7 with a mark of 0–2 in conference play, placing last out of three teams in the NEIFA. The team played home games at Weston Field in Williamstown, Massachusetts.

== Schedule ==
Date	Time	Opponent	Site	Result	Attendance	Source
October 1		Laureates of Troy*	Weston Field; Williamstown, MA	W 24–0	450	
October 5		at Laureates of Troy*	Troy, NY	W 18–0	1,000	
October 8		Troy Polytechnic*	Weston Field; Williamstown, MA	W 12–0	450	
October 12		at Yale*	Yale Field; New Haven, CT	L 0–32	1,200	
October 15	3:30 p.m.	at Harvard*	Jarvis Field; Cambridge, MA	L 0–55	1,500	
October 19		Union (NY)*	Weston Field; Williamstown, MA	W 14–4	500	
October 21		at Penn*	University Athletic Grounds; Philadelphia, PA	L 0–50	3,000	
October 29		vs. Cornell*	Ridgefield grounds; Albany, NY	L 12–24	1,000–2,000	
November 5		at Dartmouth	Hanover, NH	L 12–24	1,000	
November 12		Springfield YMCA*	Weston Field; Williamstown, MA	L 10–12	550	
November 18		Amherst	Weston Field; Williamstown, MA (rivalry)	L 0–60	1,600	
*Non-conference game
