= 1885 Amherst football team =

American college football season

1885 Amherst football
- Conference: Northern Intercollegiate Football Association
- Record: 1–8–1 (0–6 Northern)
- Head coach: None
- Captain: W. J. Nourse
- Home stadium: Blake Field

1885 Northern Intercollegiate Football Association standings
	Conf.					Overall
Team	W		L		T	W		L		T
Williams $	6	–	1	–	0	6	–	1	–	0
Boston Tech	5	–	2	–	0	6	–	3	–	0
Tufts	2	–	4	–	0	2	–	4	–	0
Amherst	0	–	6	–	0	1	–	8	–	1
$ – Conference champion

The 1885 Amherst football team represented the Amherst College as a member of the Northern Intercollegiate Football Association during the 1885 college football season. The team compiled an overall record of 1–8–1 with a mark of 0–6 in conference play, placing last out of four teams in the Northern league. The team played home games at Blake Field in Amherst, Massachusetts.

== Schedule ==
Date	Time	Opponent	Site	Result	Source
October 3		at Massachusetts*	Amherst, MA	L 0–4	
October 5		Massachusetts*	Amherst, MA	T 0–0	
October 7		at Massachusetts*	Amherst, MA	W 12–0	
October 24		Tufts	Amherst, MA	L 10–2	
October 31	2:05 p.m.	at Williams	Williamstown, MA (rivalry)	L 0–53	
November 4		Massachusetts*	Amherst, MA	L 0–8	
November 13		vs. Tufts	Union Grounds; Boston, MA	L 5–8	
November 14	2:15 p.m.	at Boston Tech	Union Grounds; Boston, MA	L 0–32	
November 18		Williams	Amherst, MA	L 15–18	
November 21		Boston Tech	Blake Field; Amherst, MA	L 0–74 or 0–80	
*Non-conference game
