= 1899 Amherst football team =

American college football season

1899 Amherst football
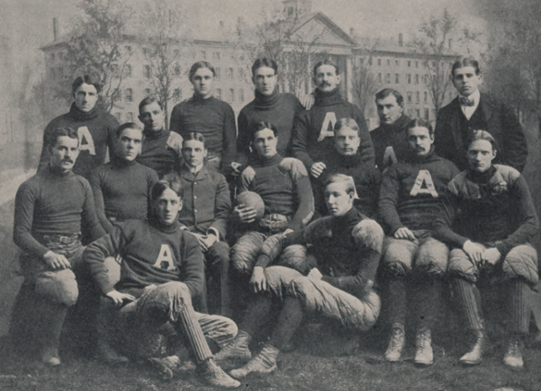
- Conference: Triangular Football League
- Record: 4–7–1 (0–2 TFL)
- Head coach: Fred W. Murphy (1st season)
- Captain: W. D. Ballantine
- Home stadium: Pratt Field

1899 Triangular Football League standings
| | Conf. | | | | | Overall |
| Team | W | | L | | T | W | | L | | T |
|---|---|---|---|---|---|---|---|---|---|---|
| Wesleyan $ | 2 | – | 0 | – | 0 | 7 | – | 2 | – | 0 |
| Williams | 1 | – | 1 | – | 0 | 9 | – | 4 | – | 0 |
| Amherst | 0 | – | 2 | – | 0 | 4 | – | 7 | – | 1 |
$ – Conference champion

The 1899 Amherst football team represented the Amherst College during the 1899 college football season. Led by Fred W. Murphy in his first and only season as head coach, Amherst compiled an overall record of 4–7–1, placing third in the Triangular Football League (TFL) with a mark of 0–2. The team played home games at Pratt Field in Amherst, Massachusetts.

Murphy had captained the 1898 Brown Bears football team. In late November 1899, he returned to Brown to assist Edward N. Robinson in coaching the 1899 Brown team for the remainder of the season.

== Schedule ==
| Date | Opponent | Site | Result | Attendance | Source |
|---|---|---|---|---|---|
| September 30 | at Yale* | Yale Field; New Haven, CT | L 0–23 | | |
| October 4 | Williston* | Pratt Field; Amherst, MA | W 20–0 | | |
| October 7 | Worcester Tech* | Amherst, MA | W 24–5 | | |
| October 11 | at Harvard* | Soldier's Field; Boston, MA | L 0–41 | | |
| October 14 | at Trinity (CT)* | Hartford, CT | T 0–0 | | |
| October 21 | at Columbia* | Manhattan Field; New York, NY | L 0–18 | 500 | |
| October 25 | Bowdoin* | Pratt Field; Amherst, MA | W 11–6 | | |
| October 28 | Boston College* | Amherst, MA | L 0–18 | | |
| November 1 | Massachusetts* | Pratt Field; Amherst, MA | L 0–6 | | |
| November 4 | MIT* | Amherst, MA | W 12–5 | | |
| November 11 | at Williams | Weston Field; Williamstown, MA (rivalry) | L 0–38 | | |
| November 18 | Wesleyan | Pratt Field; Amherst, MA | L 0–40 | | |
*Non-conference game
