= 1897 Amherst football team =

American college football season

1897 Amherst football
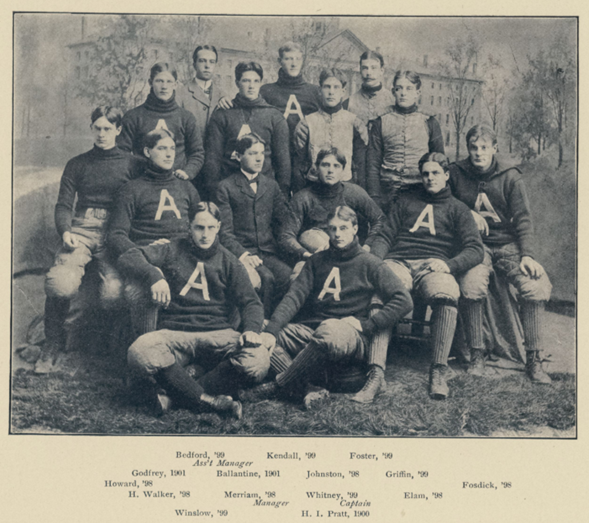
- Conference: Triangular Football League
- Record: 2–6–2 (0–1–1 TFL)
- Head coach: Albert Tyler (1st season)
- Captain: H. P. Whitney
- Home stadium: Pratt Field

1897 Triangular Football League standings
	Conf.					Overall
Team	W		L		T	W		L		T
Dartmouth $	2	–	0	–	0	4	–	3	–	0
Amherst	0	–	1	–	1	2	–	6	–	2
Williams	0	–	1	–	1	1	–	7	–	1
$ – Conference champion

The 1897 Amherst football team represented the Amherst College as a member of the Triangular Football League (TFL) during the 1897 college football season. Led by Albert Tyler in his first and only season as head coach, Amherst compiled an overall record of 2–6–2 with a mark of 0–1–1 in conference play, tying for second place in the TFL. The team played home games at Pratt Field in Amherst, Massachusetts.

== Schedule ==
Date	Time	Opponent	Site	Result	Attendance	Source
September 29		Massachusetts*	Pratt Field; Amherst, MA	W 20–4	200	
October 6		at Yale*	Yale Field; New Haven, CT	L 0–18	900	
October 9		Holy Cross*	Pratt Field; Amherst, MA	T 6–6		
October 13	4:00 p.m.	at Harvard*	Soldiers' Field; Cambridge, MA	L 0–38	3,000	
October 16		Boston Tech*	Pratt Field; Amherst, MA	W 8–6		
October 20	3:30 p.m.	at Wesleyan*	Hanover Park; Meriden, CT	L 0–24	1,000	
October 27		Wesleyan*	Pratt Field; Amherst, MA	L 0–14	600	
October 30		at Trinity (CT)*	Trinity athletic field; Hartford, CT	L 0–18		
November 6	3:15 p.m.	Williams	Pratt Field; Amherst, MA (rivalry)	T 6–6		
November 13		at Dartmouth	Hanover, NH	L 0–54		
*Non-conference game
