= 1899 Massachusetts Aggies football team =

American college football season

1899 Massachusetts Aggies football
- Conference: Athletic League of New England State Colleges
- Record: 7–3 ( Athletic League of New England State Colleges)
- Head coach: Fred W. Murphy (1st season)
- Home stadium: Alumni Field

The 1899 Massachusetts Aggies football team represented Massachusetts Agricultural College in the 1899 college football season. The team was coached by Fred W. Murphy and played its home games at Alumni Field in Amherst, Massachusetts. The 1899 season was Brown's first as head coach of the Aggies. Massachusetts finished the season with a record of 7–3.

== Schedule ==
Date	Opponent	Site	Result	Source
September 23	at Holy Cross	Worcester College Grounds; Worcester, MA	L 0–11	
September 30	at Wesleyan	Andrus Field; Middletown, CT	L 0–27	
October 7	at Springfield YMCA	Springfield, MA	W 17–0	
October 14	at Pittsfield A.C.	Pittsfield, MA	W 12–0	
October 21	at Trinity (CT)	Hartford, CT	L 5–16	
October 25	Springfield Tech	Alumni Field; Amherst, MA	W 34–0	
October 28	at Vermont	Athletic Park; Burlington, VT	W 11–6	
November 1	at Amherst	Pratt Field; Amherst, MA	W 6–0	
November 4	Connecticut	Alumni Field; Amherst, MA (rivalry)	W 34–6	
November 8	Williston Seminary	Alumni Field; Amherst, MA	W 17–0	
