= 1901 Amherst football team =

American college football season

1901 Amherst football
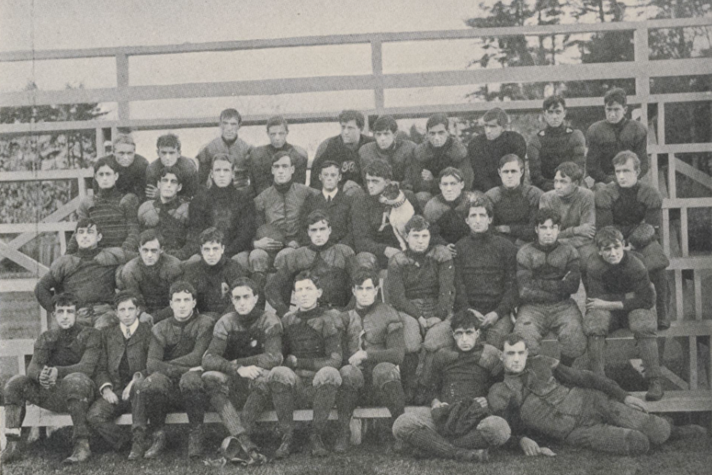
- Conference: Triangular Football League
- Record: 4–6–2 (0–2 TFL)
- Head coach: None
- Captain: A. E. Morse
- Home stadium: Pratt Field

1901 Triangular Football League standings
	Conf.					Overall
Team	W		L		T	W		L		T
Williams $	2	–	0	–	0	6	–	4	–	0
Wesleyan	1	–	1	–	0	3	–	6	–	1
Amherst	0	–	2	–	0	4	–	6	–	2
$ – Conference champion

The 1901 Amherst football team represented Amherst College as a member of the Triangular Football League during the 1901 college football season. Amherst compiled an overall record of 4–6–2 with a mark of 0–2 in conference play, placing last out of three teams in the TFL. The team played home games at Pratt Field in Amherst, Massachusetts.

== Schedule ==
Date	Time	Opponent	Site	Result	Attendance	Source
September 28		Williston Seminary*	Pratt Field; Amherst, MA	W 15–0		
October 2		at Yale*	Yale Field; New Haven, CT	L 0–6		
October 5		Worcester Tech*	Pratt Field; Amherst, MA	W 6–0		
October 9	4:00 p.m.	at Harvard*	Soldiers' Field; Boston, MA	L 0–11	3,000	
October 16		Union (NY)*	Pratt Field; Amherst, MA	T 0–0		
October 19	3:30 p.m.	at Trinity (CT)*	Broad Street grounds; Hartford, CT	T 0–0		
October 24		Bates*	Pratt Field; Amherst, MA	W 5–0		
October 26	3:30 p.m.	at Syracuse*	University Oval; Syracuse, NY	L 17–28	5,000	
November 2		Bowdoin*	Pratt Field; Amherst, MA	L 29–6		
November 9		Massachusetts*	Pratt Field; Amherst, MA	W 0–5		
November 16		at Williams	Weston Field; Williamstown, MA (rivalry)	L 5–21		
November 23		Wesleyan	Pratt Field; Amherst, MA	L 11–15		
*Non-conference game
