= 1887 Trinity Bantams football team =

American college football season

1887 Trinity Bantams football
- Conference: Eastern Intercollegiate Football Association
- Record: 3–3–1 (2–2 EIFA)
- Head coach: None
- Home stadium: Ward Street grounds

1887 Eastern Intercollegiate Football Association standings
	Conf.					Overall
Team	W		L		T	W		L		T
Boston Tech $	4	–	0	–	0	5	–	3	–	0
Dartmouth	2	–	1	–	1	3	–	1	–	1
Trinity (CT)	2	–	2	–	0	3	–	3	–	1
Amherst	1	–	3	–	0	4	–	6	–	0
Stevens	0	–	3	–	1	0	–	6	–	1
$ – Conference champion

The 1887 Trinity Bantams football team represented Trinity College as a member of the Eastern Intercollegiate Football Association (EIFA) during the 1887 college football season. Trinity compiled an overall record of 3–3–1 with a mark of 2–2 in conference play, placing third in the EIFA. The team played home games at the Ward Street Grounds in Hartford, Connecticut.

== Schedule ==
Date	Time	Opponent	Site	Result	Attendance	Source
October 8	2:45 p.m.	Wesleyan*	Ward Street grounds; Hartford, CT	L 0–58		
October 15	3:00 p.m.	Massachusetts*	Ward Street grounds; Hartford, CT	W 32–4		
October 22	2:30 p.m. or 2.40 p.m.	Boston University*	Ward Street grounds; Hartford, CT	T 14–14		
October 29	3:00 p.m.	Amherst	Ward Street grounds; Hartford, CT	W 22–6	500	
November 5		at Boston Tech	Union Grounds; Boston, MA	L 0–74		
November 12	2:45 p.m.	Stevens	Ward Street grounds; Hartford, CT	W 26–0		
November 19	2:35 p.m.	at Dartmouth	Hanover, NH	L 0–64		
*Non-conference game
