= 1887 Boston Tech football team =

American college football season

1887 Boston Tech football

EIFA champion
- Conference: Eastern Intercollegiate Football Association
- Record: 5–3 (4–0 EIFA)
- Head coach: None
- Home stadium: Union Grounds

1887 Eastern Intercollegiate Football Association standings
	Conf.					Overall
Team	W		L		T	W		L		T
Boston Tech $	4	–	0	–	0	5	–	3	–	0
Dartmouth	2	–	1	–	1	3	–	1	–	1
Trinity (CT)	2	–	2	–	0	3	–	3	–	1
Amherst	1	–	3	–	0	4	–	6	–	0
Stevens	0	–	3	–	1	0	–	6	–	1
$ – Conference champion

The 1887 Boston Tech football team represented Boston Tech—now known as the Massachusetts Institute of Technology (MIT)—as a member of the Eastern Intercollegiate Football Association (EIFA) during the 1887 college football season. Boston Tech compiled an overall record of 5–3 with a mark of 4–0 in conference play, winning the EIFA title. The team played home games at Union Grounds in Boston.

== Schedule ==
Date	Time	Opponent	Site	Result	Attendance	Source
October 12	4:20 p.m.	at Harvard second team*	Union Grounds; Boston, MA	L 10–12		
October 15	3:20 p.m.	at Harvard*	Jarvis Field; Cambridge, MA	L 0–60	600	
October 18	4:48 p.m.	Boston University*	Boston, MA	W 21–0		
October 22	3:15 p.m.	at Phillips Exeter*	Exeter, NH	L 14–26		
October 26	3:06 p.m.	Dartmouth	Union Grounds; Boston, MA	W 24–15		
October 29	3:20 p.m.	Tufts*	Union Grounds; Boston, MA	W 36–0		
November 5		Trinity (CT)	Union Grounds; Boston, MA	W 74–0		
November 12		at Amherst	Blake Field; Amherst, MA	W 54–0		
November 19		at Stevens	St. George's Cricket Grounds; Hoboken, NJ	W 20–0		
*Non-conference game
