= 1895 Dartmouth football team =

American college football season

1895 Dartmouth football
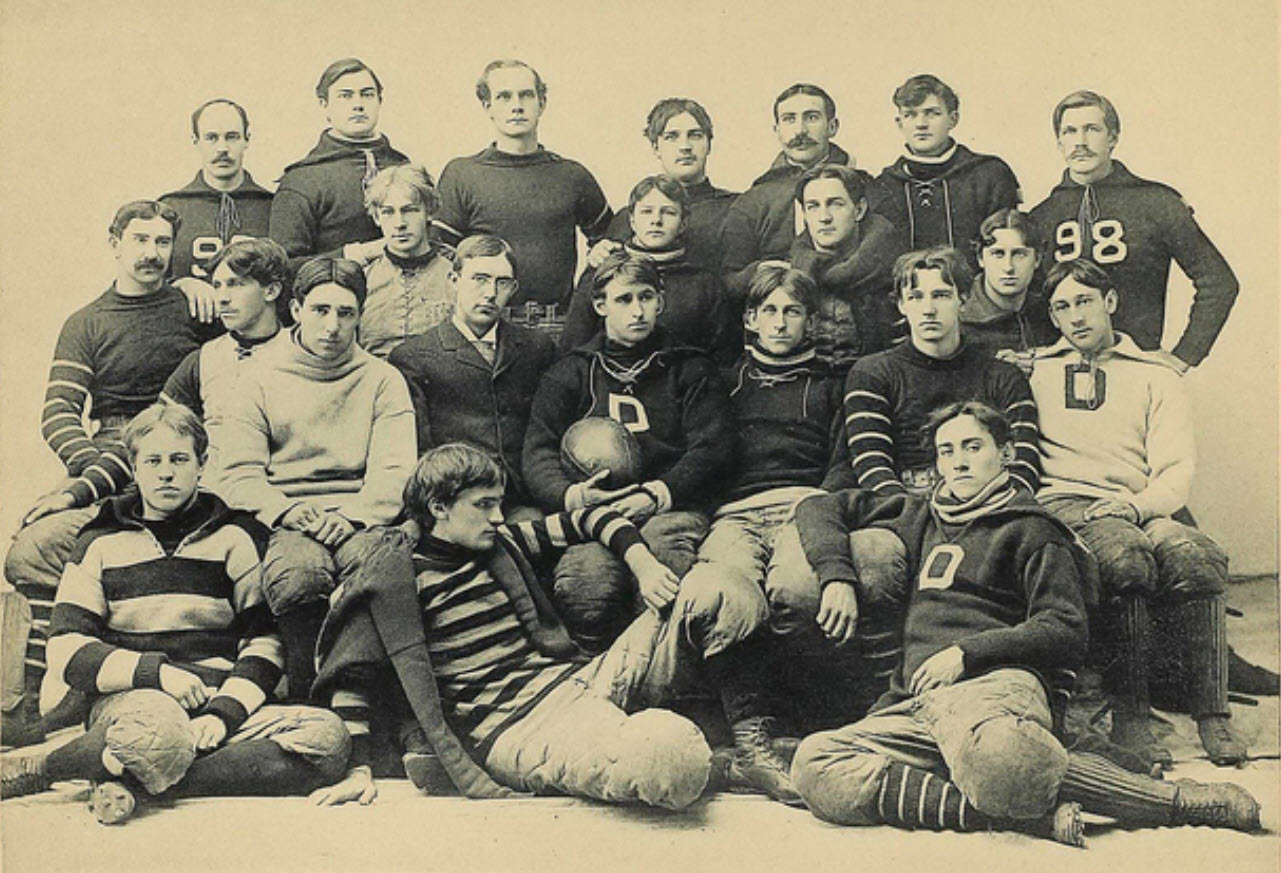

TFL champion
- Conference: Triangular Football League
- Record: 7–5–1 (2–0 TFL)
- Head coach: William Wurtenburg (1st season)
- Captain: Walter McCornack
- Home stadium: Alumni Oval

1895 Triangular Football League standings
	Conf.					Overall
Team	W		L		T	W		L		T
Dartmouth $	2	–	0	–	0	7	–	5	–	1
Amherst	1	–	1	–	0	6	–	5	–	0
Williams	0	–	2	–	0	4	–	5	–	0
$ – Conference champion

The 1895 Dartmouth football team represented Dartmouth College as a member of the Triangular Football League during the 1895 college football season. Head coach William Wurtenburg scheduled a 13-game season for 1895, a still-standing record at Dartmouth for most games played in a single year. The team compiled an overall record of 7–5–1 with a mark of 2–0 in TFL play, winning the league title. The season began with a 50–0 shutout of Phillips Exeter Academy, which was followed by a close game with Harvard. The match was hard-fought; Harvard won by a slim 4–0 margin, the closest that a Dartmouth team had gotten to beating Harvard. The squad then played three smaller colleges, winning two of the games and tying the other. The team then went back-and-forth between losing and winning, falling twice to Yale and once to West Point, but defeating MIT and Boston University. Conference opponents Williams and Amherst were defeated by a combined score of 30–5, and the team was awarded its third straight Triangular Football League championship. The season ended on a negative note, however, with a close 10–4 loss to Brown.

== Schedule ==
Date	Opponent	Site	Result	Attendance	Source
September 25	Phillips Exeter Academy*	Hanover, NH	W 50–0	450	
September 28	at Harvard*	Soldier's Field; Boston, MA (rivalry)	L 0–4	3,000	
October 4	vs. South Berwick*	Burgett Park; Dover, NH	W 12–6	1,000	
October 5	vs. Bowdoin*	Deering grounds; Portland, ME	T 10–10	800	
October 12	Bates*	Hanover, NH	W 38–0	400	
October 16	at Yale*	Yale Field; New Haven, CT	L 0–26		
October 19	vs. MIT*	Manchester, NH	W 30–0	500	
October 26	at Army*	The Plain; West Point, New York	L 0–6	2,000	
October 30	at Yale*	Yale Field; New Haven, CT	L 0–32	1,500	
November 2	Boston University*	Hanover, NH	W 12–0	300	
November 9	Amherst	Alumni Oval; Hanover, NH	W 20–0	1,000–1,500	
November 16	at Williams	Weston Field; Williamstown, MA	W 10–5	1,000	
November 28	at Brown*	Adelaide Park; Providence, RI	L 4–10	6,000	
*Non-conference game
