= 1900 Wesleyan Methodists football team =

American college football season

1900 Wesleyan Methodists football

TFL champion
- Conference: Triangular Football League
- Record: 5–4 (2–0 TFL)
- Head coach: Robert P. Wilson (3rd season)
- Home stadium: Andrus Field

1900 Triangular Football League standings
	Conf.					Overall
Team	W		L		T	W		L		T
Wesleyan $	2	–	0	–	0	5	–	4	–	0
Williams	1	–	1	–	0	6	–	4	–	1
Amherst	0	–	2	–	0	4	–	7	–	1
$ – Conference champion

The 1900 Wesleyan Methodists football team represented Wesleyan University as a member of the Triangular Football League (TFL) during the 1900 college football season. Led by third-year head coach Robert P. Wilson, the Methodists compiled an overall record of 5–4 with mark of 2–0 in conference play, winning the TFL title. Wesleyan played home games at Andrus Field in Middletown, Connecticut.

== Schedule ==
Date	Time	Opponent	Site	Result	Attendance	Source
September 29	3:00 p.m.	at Harvard*	Soldiers' Field; Boston, MA	L 0–24	1,000–1,500	
October 6		at Columbia*	Manhattan Field; New York, NY	L 0–12	2,000	
October 13		Massachusetts*	Andrus Field; Middletown, CT	W 17–0		
October 20		at Yale*	Yale Field; New Haven, CT	L 0–38	4,000	
October 27	3:00 pm.	at Trinity (CT)*	Hartford, CT	L 0–5	400	
November 3		at Dartmouth*	Alumni Oval; Hanover, NH	W 16–5		
November 10		Holy Cross*	Andrus Field; Middletown, CT	W 11–5		
November 17		at Williams	Weston Field; Williamstown, MA	W 35–0		
November 24		Amherst	Andrus Field; Middletown, CT	W 17–0	1,000	
*Non-conference game
