= 1898 Dartmouth football team =

American college football season

1898 Dartmouth football
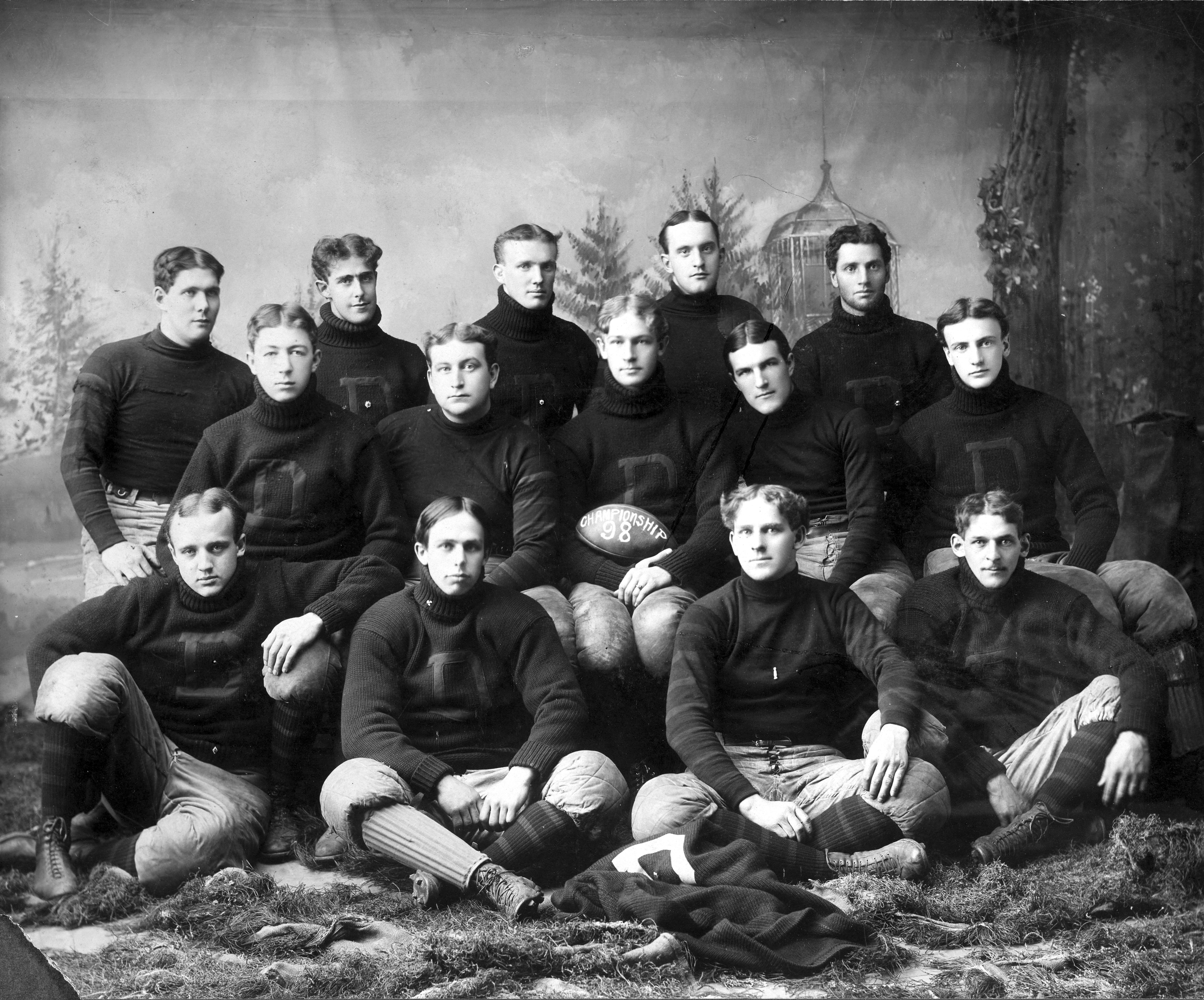

TFL champion
- Conference: Triangular Football League
- Record: 5–6 (2–0 TFL)
- Head coach: William Wurtenburg (4th season)
- Captain: Fred Crolius
- Home stadium: Alumni Oval

1898 Triangular Football League standings
	Conf.					Overall
Team	W		L		T	W		L		T
Dartmouth $	2	–	0	–	0	5	–	6	–	0
Amherst	1	–	1	–	0	4	–	5	–	1
Williams	0	–	2	–	0	3	–	8	–	0
$ – Conference champion

The 1898 Dartmouth football team represented Dartmouth College in the 1898 college football season.

Despite finishing with a losing record, the 1898 Dartmouth team was regarded by some eastern sportswriters, most notably Outing, to be the best fielded by head coach William Wurtenburg. Against an expanded schedule, the squad went only 5–6, but managed to outscore their opponents by a total of 205–137. The year began with a defeat of regular opponent Phillips Exeter Academy, and was followed by a shutout loss to Harvard. After two consecutive wins over nearby schools, Dartmouth lost to former Triangular Football League opponent Wesleyan, 23–5. The following two contests were against Triangular Football League opponents Amherst and Williams. The latter game was regarded as Dartmouth's most significant game of the season by eastern sportswriters, since Williams had hired two new coaches and expanded practices in order to win the conference in 1898. Dartmouth outdid Williams, however, and defeated them 10–6 to claim a sixth straight conference championship. The season ended on a sour note with four straight losses on the road, two of them coming against Midwestern teams.

== Schedule ==
Date	Time	Opponent	Site	Result	Attendance	Source
October 1		Phillips Exeter Academy*	Hanover, NH	W 23–5		
October 8	3:00 p.m.	at Harvard*	Soldiers' Field; Boston, MA (rivalry)	L 0–21		
October 15		Bowdoin*	Hanover, NH	W 35–6		
October 22		at Vermont*	Athletic Park; Burlington, VT	W 45–6		
October 29		Wesleyan*	Alumni Oval; Hanover, NH	L 5–23	700	
November 5		at Amherst	Pratt Field; Amherst, MA	W 64–6	1,000	
November 12		at Williams	Weston Field; Williamstown, MA	W 10–6	1,000	
November 21		at Brown*	Adelaide Park; Providence, RI	L 0–12	2,000	
November 24		at Chicago Athletic Association*	Wanderers' Cricket Field; Chicago, IL	L 5–18		
November 26		at Cincinnati*	League Park; Cincinnati, OH	L 12–17	1,500	
Unknown		at Carlisle*	Carlisle, PA	L 6–17		
*Non-conference game
