= Joseph H. Edwards =

American football player and coach (1873–1911)

Joseph Henry Edwards

Biographical details
- Born: May 3, 1873; Boston, Massachusetts, U.S.
- Died: July 27, 1911 (aged 38); Middleborough, Massachusetts, U.S.

Playing career

Football
- 1895–1897: Dartmouth
- Position: Tackle

Coaching career (HC unless noted)

Football
- 1899–1900: Case

Head coaching record
- Overall: 3–8–4

Joseph Henry Edwards (May 3, 1873 – July 27, 1911) was an American college football player and coach.

== Biography ==
Edwards was born May 3, 1873, in Boston. He attended high school at Middleborough, Massachusetts, where he was a two-year captain of the football team, graduating in 1895. For his undergraduate career, he attended Dartmouth College, graduating in 1899. He was a member of the Casque and Gauntlet secret society and Sigma Chi social fraternity.

As a collegiate athlete, he played football for Dartmouth as a Tackle, from 1895 to 1897. In 1898, Edwards served in the Spanish–American War with the 1st New Hampshire Regiment. He coached the Case School of Applied Science from 1899 to 1900, achieving a record of 3–8–4. Edwards died of apoplexy in 1911 at the age of 38.

== Head coaching record ==
Year	Team	Overall	Conference	Standing	Bowl/playoffs
Case (Independent) (1899–1900)
1899	Case	3–3–2			
1900	Case	0–5–2			
Case:		3–8–4			
Total:		3–8–4			
