= 1894 Dartmouth football team =

American college football season

1894 Dartmouth football

TFL champion
- Conference: Triangular Football League
- Record: 5–4 (2–0 TFL)
- Head coach: Wallace Moyle (2nd season)
- Home stadium: Alumni Oval

1894 Triangular Football League standings
	Conf.					Overall
Team	W		L		T	W		L		T
Dartmouth $	2	–	0	–	0	5	–	4	–	0
Williams	1	–	1	–	0	6	–	3	–	1
Amherst	0	–	2	–	0	7	–	5	–	1
$ – Conference champion

The 1894 Dartmouth football team represented Dartmouth College as a member of the Triangular Football League (TFL) the 1894 college football season. Led by second-year head coach Wallace Moyle, Dartmouth compiled an overall record of 5–4 with a mark of 2–0 in TFL play, winning the league title.

== Schedule ==
Date	Time	Opponent	Site	Result	Attendance	Source
September 29	3:30 p.m.	at Harvard*	Soldiers' Field; Boston, MA (rivalry)	L 0–5	2,000–3,000	
October 13		Tufts*	Alumni Oval; Hanover, NH	W 12–0	400	
October 17		vs. Yale*	Hampden Park; Springfield, MA	L 0–34	700	
October 20		Bowdoin*	Hanover, NH	W 42–0		
October 24		at Bowdoin*	Brunswick, ME	W 14–0	400	
November 3		Williams	Hanover, NH	W 20–0	1,200	
November 10		at Amherst	Pratt Field; Amherst, MA	W 30–0	1,200	
November 24	10:30 a.m.	vs. Brown*	Outing Park; Springfield, MA	L 4–20	1,200	
November 29	2:15 p.m.	at Chicago Athletic Association*	South Side Athletic Park; Chicago, IL	L 0–4	4,000	
*Non-conference game
