= 1885 Williams Ephs football team =

American college football season

1885 Williams Ephs football

Northern league champion
- Conference: Northern Intercollegiate Football Association
- Record: 6–1 (6–1 Northern)
- Head coach: None

1885 Northern Intercollegiate Football Association standings
	Conf.					Overall
Team	W		L		T	W		L		T
Williams $	6	–	1	–	0	6	–	1	–	0
Boston Tech	5	–	2	–	0	6	–	3	–	0
Tufts	2	–	4	–	0	2	–	4	–	0
Amherst	0	–	6	–	0	1	–	8	–	1
$ – Conference champion

The 1885 Williams Ephs football team represented the Williams College as a member of the Northern Intercollegiate Football Association during the 1885 college football season. The team compiled an overall record of 6–1 with an identical mark in conference play, winning the Northern league title.

== Schedule ==
Date	Time	Opponent	Site	Result	Attendance	Source
October 17	3:15 p.m.	Tufts	Williamstown, MA	W 49–0		
October 24	2:03 p.m.	Boston Tech	Williamstown, MA	W 19–6		
October 31	2:05 p.m.	Amherst	Williamstown, MA (rivalry)	W 53–0		
November 6	2:00 p.m.	vs. Tufts	Union Grounds; Boston, MA	W 28–0	200	
November 7		at Boston Tech	Union Grounds; Boston, MA	L 14–0		
November 18		at Amherst	Amherst, MA	W 18–15		
November 25	2:00 p.m.	vs. Boston Tech	Hampden Park; Springfield, MA	W 18–10	200	
