= John B. Eckstorm =

American player and coach (1873–1964)

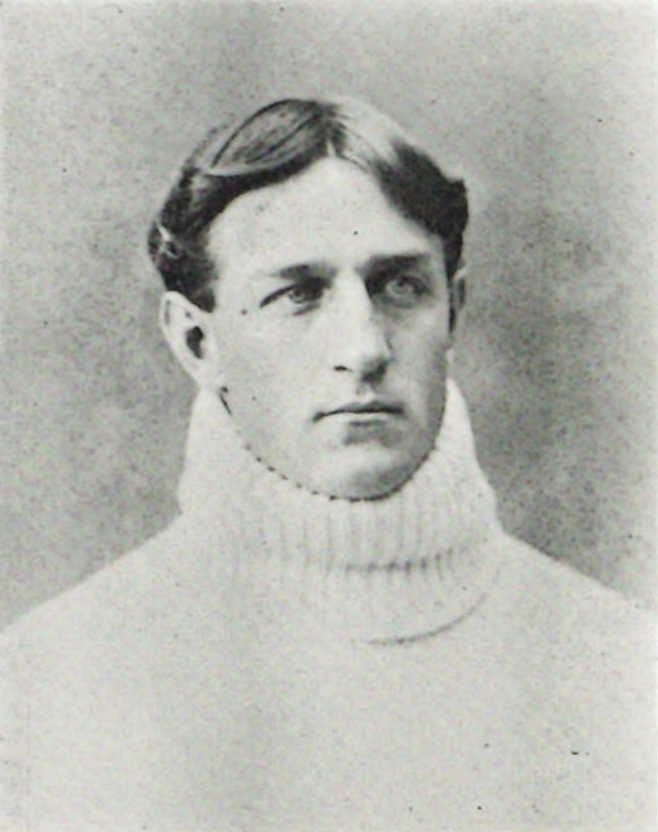
- Eckstorm pictured in Makio 1901, Ohio State yearbook

Biographical details
- Born: October 22, 1874; South Bend, Minnesota, U.S.
- Died: October 28, 1964 (aged 90); Marysville, Ohio, U.S.

Playing career
- 1894–1897: Dartmouth
- Position: Halfback

Coaching career (HC unless noted)
- 1898: Kenyon
- 1899–1901: Ohio State
- 1902: Ohio Medical
- 1903–1904: Kenyon
- 1905–1906: Ohio Medical

Head coaching record
- Overall: 52–24–6

John Bernard Christian Eckstorm (October 22, 1873 – October 28, 1964) was an American college football player and coach. He played football as a halfback at Dartmouth College from 1894 to 1897 and was captain of the 1897 Dartmouth football team as a senior. Eckstorm served two stints as the head football coach at Kenyon College in Gambier, Ohio, in 1898 and from 1903 to 1904, and one stint at Ohio State University, from 1899 to 1901.

== Early life and playing career ==
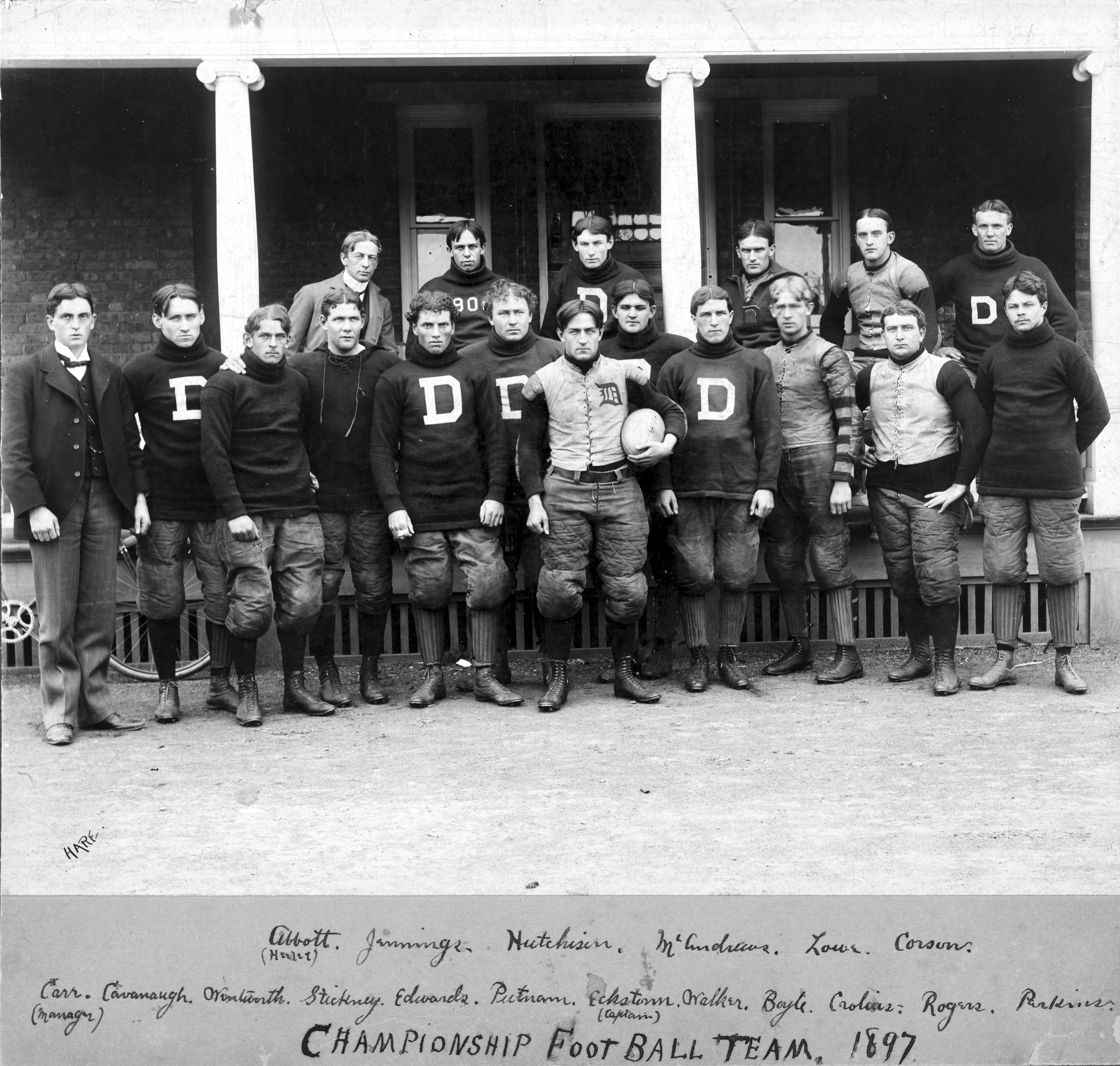
Dartmouth football in 1897 where Eckstorm served as team captain.

Eckstorm grew up in Chicago and attended Lake View High School there, where excelled in athletics, captaining the football team for two years, playing baseball, and setting the Chicago interscholastic record in the broad jump. Eckstorm moved on to Dartmouth College, where he played college football for four seasons, from 1894 to 1897, as a halfback. He was elected as captain of the 1897 Dartmouth football team for his senior by his teammates, succeeding Walter McCornack.

== Coaching career ==
Eckstorm served as the head coach at Ohio State University from 1899 to 1901, compiling a record of 22–4–3. Eckstorm was the first Ohio State Buckeyes football coach to have a winning record at the school. In his first season in 1899, the Buckeyes went 9–0–1 giving Ohio State their first undefeated season in school history. The next season, he led Ohio State to a tie against Michigan in the second meeting of the two schools.

During the 1901 season, captain John Sigrist endured an injury during a game with Western Reserve University. Forty-eight hours later, he was pronounced dead and it very nearly led to the abolishment of football at Ohio State. It remains the only death because of injuries sustained during play in Ohio State history. A resolution to cancel the remainder of the season was defeated by an 18–8 vote, but it proved difficult for the Buckeyes to emotionally recover. They lost three of the last four games and Coach Eckstorm decided to leave his post at the end of the season.

== Late life and death ==
Eckstorm was later a physician in Ohio and Chief Medical Officer at the Ohio Penitentiary. He died on October 28, 1964, at his daughter's home in Marysville, Ohio.

== Head coaching record ==
Year	Team	Overall	Conference	Standing	Bowl/playoffs
Kenyon Lords (Independent) (1898)
1898	Kenyon	4–3			
Ohio State Buckeyes (Independent) (1899–1901)
1899	Ohio State	9–0–1			
1900	Ohio State	8–1–1			
1901	Ohio State	5–3–1			
Ohio State:		22–4–3			
Ohio Medical (Independent) (1902)
1902	Ohio Medical	9–1			
Kenyon Lords (Ohio Athletic Conference) (1903–1904)
1903	Kenyon	2–6–1	0–4–1	6th	
1904	Kenyon	3–5–1	0–4	6th	
Kenyon:		9–14–2	0–8–1		
Ohio Medical (Independent) (1905–1906)
1905	Ohio Medical	6–3			
1906	Ohio Medical	6–2–1			
Ohio Medical:		21–6–1			
Total:		52–24–6			
