= 1901 Williams Ephs football team =

American college football season

1901 Williams Ephs football

TFL champion
- Conference: Triangular Football League
- Record: 6–4 (2–0 TFL)
- Head coach: Josiah J. Hazen (2nd season)
- Captain: Frank "Buck" O'Neill
- Home stadium: Weston Field

1901 Triangular Football League standings
	Conf.					Overall
Team	W		L		T	W		L		T
Williams $	2	–	0	–	0	6	–	4	–	0
Wesleyan	1	–	1	–	0	3	–	6	–	1
Amherst	0	–	2	–	0	4	–	6	–	2
$ – Conference champion

The 1901 Williams Ephs football team represented the Williams College as a member of the Triangular Football League (TFL) during the 1901 college football season. Led by Josiah J. Hazen in his second and final season as head coach, Williams compiled an overall record of 6–4 with a mark of 2–0 in conference play, winning the TFL title. Frank "Buck" O'Neill served as team captain. Williams played home games at Weston Field in Williamstown, Massachusetts.

== Schedule ==
Date	Time	Opponent	Site	Result	Attendance	Source
September 28	3:30 p.m.	at Harvard*	Soldiers' Field; Cambridge, MA	L 0–16	1,500	
October 2		Laureates of Troy*	Weston Field; Williamstown, MA	W 6–0		
October 5		at Columbia*	Polo Grounds; New York, NY	L 0–5		
October 9		Colgate*	Weston Field; Williamstown, MA	W 29–0		
October 16		Massachusetts*	Weston Field; Williamstown, MA	W 17–0		
October 19	3:00 p.m.	vs. Dartmouth*	Newton Athletic Club gridiron; Newton, MA	L 2–6		
October 26		at Army*	The Plain; West Point, NY	L 0–15		
November 2		vs. Hamilton*	Ridgefield oval; Albany, NY	W 22–0	1,000	
November 9		at Wesleyan	Andrus Field; Middletown, CT	W 11–5		
November 16		Amherst	Weston Field; Williamstown, MA (rivalry)	W 21–5		
*Non-conference game
