= 1899 Wesleyan Methodists football team =

American college football season

1899 Wesleyan Methodists football

TFL champion
- Conference: Triangular Football League
- Record: 7–2 (2–0 TFL)
- Head coach: Robert P. Wilson (2nd season)
- Home stadium: Andrus Field

1899 Triangular Football League standings
	Conf.					Overall
Team	W		L		T	W		L		T
Wesleyan $	2	–	0	–	0	7	–	2	–	0
Williams	1	–	1	–	0	9	–	4	–	0
Amherst	0	–	2	–	0	4	–	7	–	1
$ – Conference champion

The 1899 Wesleyan Methodists football team represented Wesleyan University as a member of the Triangular Football League (TFL) during the 1899 college football season. Led by second-year head coach Robert P. Wilson, the Methodists compiled an overall record of 7–2 with mark of 2–0 in conference play, winning the TFL title. Wesleyan played home games at Andrus Field in Middletown, Connecticut.

== Schedule ==
Date	Time	Opponent	Site	Result	Attendance	Source
September 30		Massachusetts*	Andrus Field; Middletown, CT	W 27–0		
October 7	3:00 p.m.	at Harvard*	Soldiers' Field; Boston, MA	L 0–20	1,500	
October 18	3:00 p.m.	at Penn*	Franklin Field; Philadelphia, PA	L 6–17	2,000	
October 21		MIT*	Andrus Field; Middletown, CT	W 44–5		
October 28		vs. Union (NY)*	Hampden Park; Springfield, MA	W 41–0	200	
November 4		Dartmouth*	Andrus Field; Middletown, CT	W 11–0		
November 11		Holy Cross*	Andrus Field; Middletown, CT	W 16–0		
November 18		at Amherst	Pratt Field; Amherst, MA	W 40–0		
November 25		Williams	Andrus Field; Middletown, CT	W 5–11		
*Non-conference game
