= Charles J. Boyle =

American football player and coach

Charlie Boyle
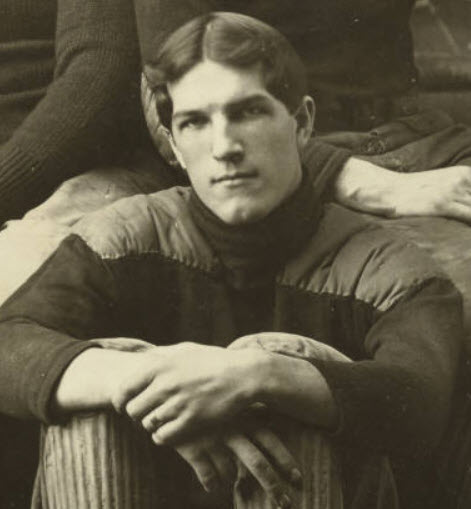

Biographical details
- Born: c. 1877
- Died: April 21, 1947 (aged 69–70); Larchmont, New York, U.S.

Playing career
- 1896–1900: Dartmouth
- Position: End

Coaching career (HC unless noted)
- 1901–1902: Ohio Wesleyan
- 1903: Western Reserve

Head coaching record
- Overall: 18–11

Charles John Boyle (c. 1877 – April 21, 1947) was an American college football player and coach. Boyle grew up in Worcester, Massachusetts and played football at Dartmouth College from 1896 to 1900 before graduating in 1901. He was an assistant football coach at Dartmouth for a couple years and was the head football coach at Ohio Wesleyan University from 1901 to 1902 and Western Reserve University in Cleveland in 1903.

== Head coaching record ==
=== Football ===
Year	Team	Overall	Conference	Standing	Bowl/playoffs
Ohio Wesleyan (Independent) (1901)
1901	Ohio Wesleyan	8–2			
Ohio Wesleyan (Ohio Athletic Conference) (1902)
1902	Ohio Wesleyan	7–3	2–2	3rd	
Ohio Wesleyan:		15–5	2–2		
Western Reserve (Ohio Athletic Conference) (1903)
1903	Western Reserve	3–6	1–3	5th	
Western Reserve:		3–6	1–3		
Total:		18–11			
