= Dartmouth Big Green football =

American football program representing Dartmouth College

2025 Dartmouth Big Green football team
- First season: 1881; 145 years ago
- Head coach: Sammy McCorkle; 3rd season, 21–9 (.700)
- Location: Hanover, New Hampshire
- Stadium: Memorial Field (capacity: 15,600)
- NCAA division: Division I FCS
- Conference: Ivy League
- Nickname: Big Green
- Colors: Dartmouth green and white
- All-time record: 748–475–46 (.608)

National championships
- Claimed: 1925

Conference championships
- Triangular Football League: 1888, 1889, 1893, 1894, 1895, 1896, 1897, 1898 Ivy League: 1958, 1962, 1963, 1965, 1966, 1969, 1970, 1971, 1972, 1973, 1978, 1981, 1982, 1990, 1991, 1992, 1996, 2015, 2019, 2021, 2023, 2024
- Consensus All-Americans: 15
- Rivalries: Cornell (rivalry); Harvard (rivalry); New Hampshire (rivalry)

Uniforms
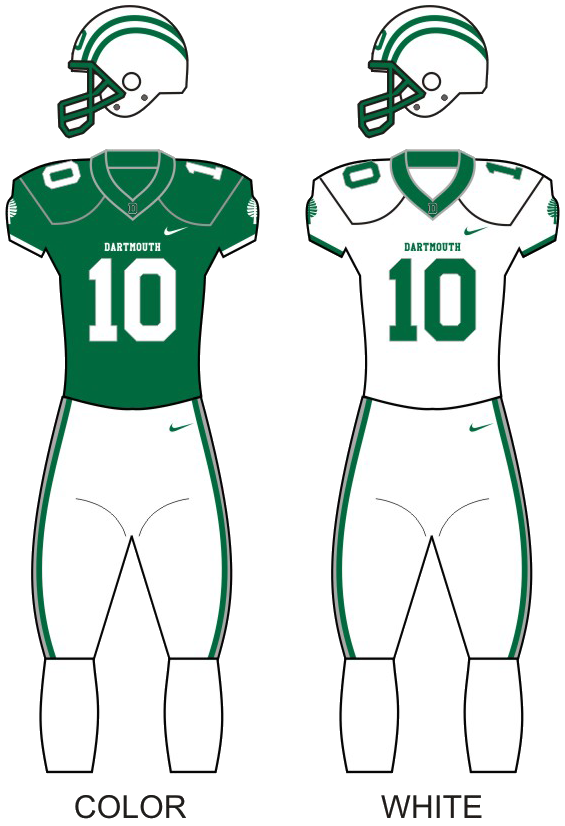
- Fight song: As the Backs Go Tearing By
- Mascot: Keggy the Keg (Note: Unofficial mascot, but widely accepted as the mascot by the student body.)
- Website: DartmouthSports.com

Big Green

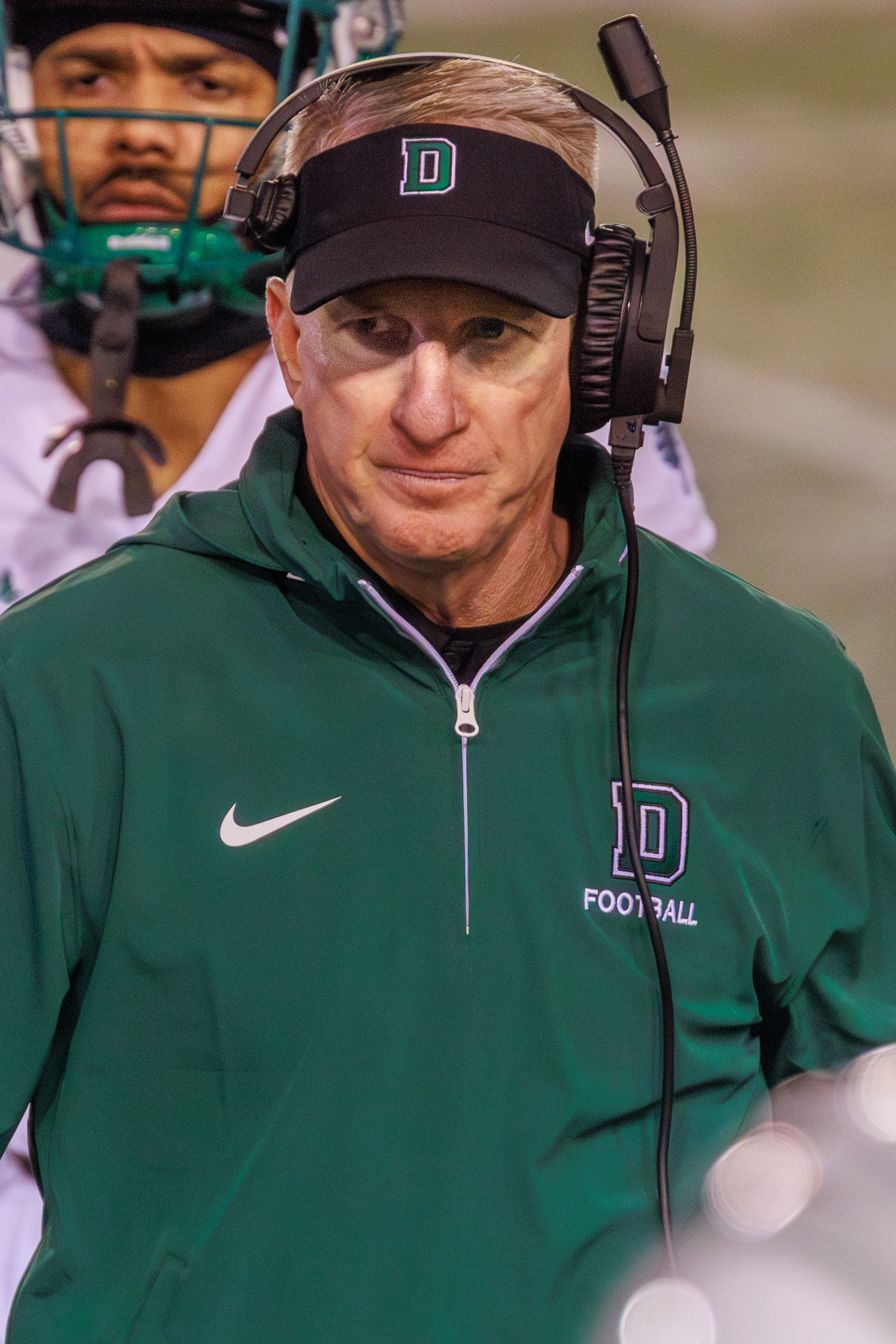
Coach Sammy McCorkle

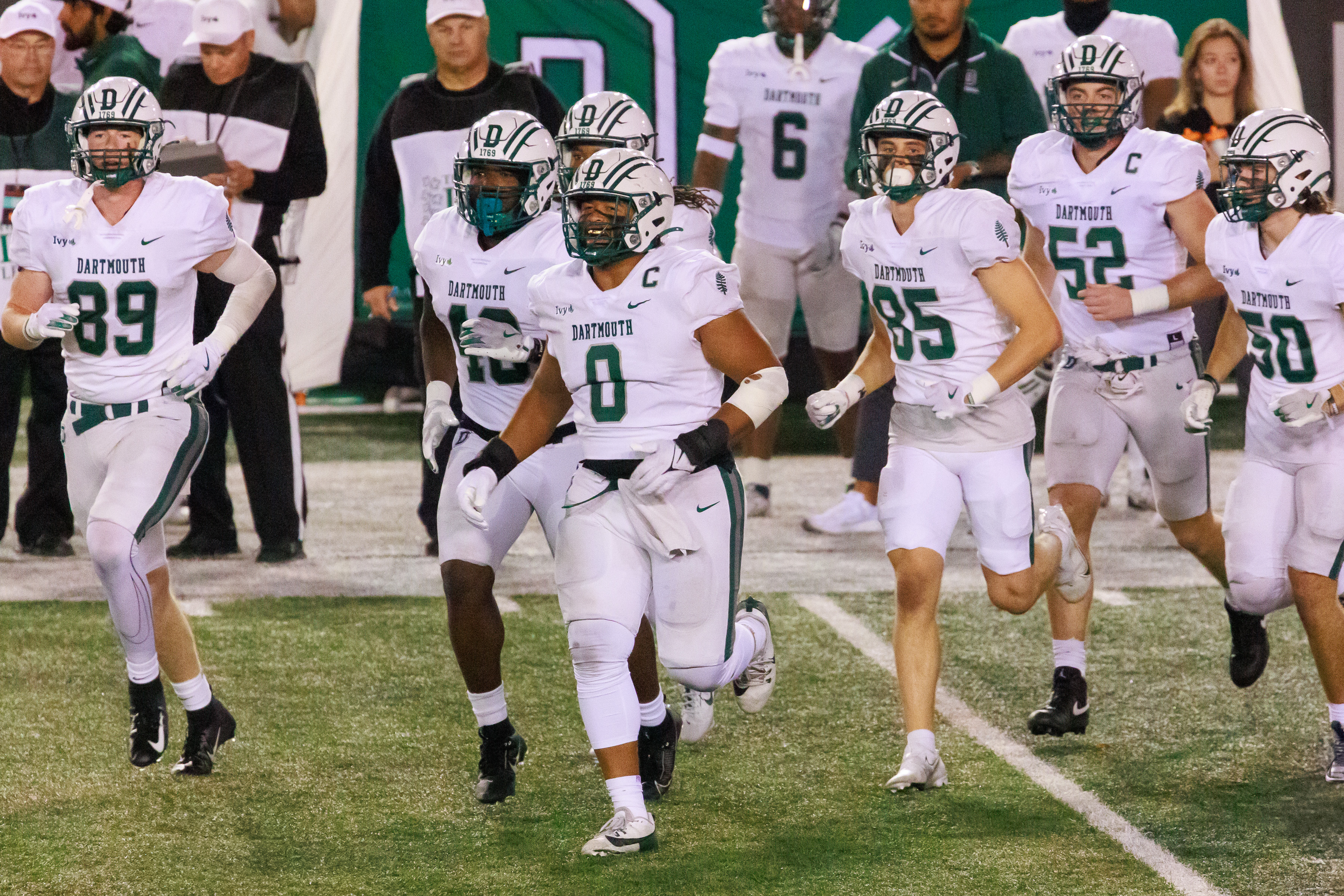
Big Green in 2024

The Dartmouth Big Green football team represents Dartmouth College in NCAA Division I Football Championship Subdivision (FCS) college football competition as a member of the Ivy League. The team possesses a storied tradition that includes a national championship, and holds a record 22 Ivy League Football Championships with 11 College Football Hall of Fame inductees.

After Dartmouth formally entered the Ivy League in 1956, head coach Bob Blackman led the 1962 team to the program's first undefeated season since the 1925 national championship team. Blackman also had his first All-American player in Donald McKinnon, class of 1963, who anchored a strong defense that allowed only six points in its first five games.

== History ==
The sport of football, in its embryonic form, was played on the campus as early as 1876. Goalposts were erected on the green, where they stood for several months before being removed for the 1877 commencement. The first intercollegiate game occurred on November 17, 1881, when Amherst traveled to Dartmouth. The Green won with a score of 1–0. On November 24, the teams met in Springfield, Massachusetts for a rematch on Thanksgiving Day, and the scoreless game ended prematurely in a tie because of snow. In the following years, Dartmouth played games against some of the best teams in the nation. In 1882, Dartmouth played Harvard for the first time and lost, 53–0. In 1884, Yale visited Dartmouth and routed the Green, 113–0. The Elis teams did not return to Hanover until 1971.

From 1887 to 1898, Dartmouth competed against schools such as MIT, Amherst, and Williams as a member of the Triangular Football League. During that period, the Big Green secured eight conference championships, all of them outright except one shared with MIT in 1888.

From 1901 to 1909, Dartmouth compiled a 58–9–7 record under several different head coaches. In 1901, Dartmouth played their first game against their intrastate rivals, UNH. In 1903, Dartmouth traveled to Harvard for the dedication game of their opponents' stadium. The Green, who had lost the first 18 meetings by a combined margin of 552 points to 18, upset the Crimson, 11–0. From 1911 to 1916, Frank "the Iron Major" Cavanaugh, led the Green to a 42–9–3 record. He volunteered for World War I at the age of 41, and was replaced as coach by one of his former players, Clarence Spears. Spears attained a 21–9–1 record with the Green, and went on to further success at West Virginia and Minnesota, among others.

Before the 1922 game against Harvard, the media began referring to Dartmouth as "the Indians", in addition to their preexisting nickname of the Big Green. In 1923, Jesse Hawley took over as head coach. In 1925, the Green finished 8–0, and two of that team's players, Swede Oberlander and Myles Lane, were later inducted into the College Football Hall of Fame. One, Nathan Parker, became a Rhodes Scholar. The Indians were named 1925 national champions by Parke H. Davis and the Dickinson system.

Earl "Red" Blaik became head coach in 1934 and posted a 45–15–4 mark in his seven seasons. In 1935, he led them to their first victory over Yale, 14–6. Between 1936 and 1938, the Green compiled a 22-game unbeaten streak, but declined an invitation to the 1937 Rose Bowl. Against Cornell, in 1940, they played the infamous Fifth Down Game. In 1941, Blaik left to coach the Army team at West Point, whom he led to two consecutive national championships. The 1970 Dartmouth football team was undefeated (9-0; 7-0 Ivy) and won the Lambert Trophy, symbolizing the best Division 1 football team in the Northeast. They scored 311 points, while only giving up 42 points, with 6 shutouts. The team finished the season ranked 14 nationally by the AP.

Dartmouth played its first season of football as a member of the Ivy League in 1956. Future Hall of Fame inductee Bob Blackman took over as head coach and went on to compile a 104–37–3 record and seven Ivy League titles. Jake Crouthamel, from 1971 to 1977, and Joe Yukica, from 1978 to 1986, each coached the Green to three more Ivy League championships. Following the 1981 season, the Ivy League was reclassified to Division I-AA, today known as the Football Championship Subdivision (FCS), Dartmouth moved to Division I-AA play with the rest of the league.

The 1978 Ivy League Player of the Year, Buddy Teevens, succeeded Yukica in 1987. Teevens spent five years at Dartmouth and captured two conference championships. John Lyons led the Green to two more titles and another 22-game unbeaten streak. Teevens returned in 2005 and was the head coach until 2023. Beginning in 2018 Dartmouth will play New England Ivy League rival Brown in their final game.

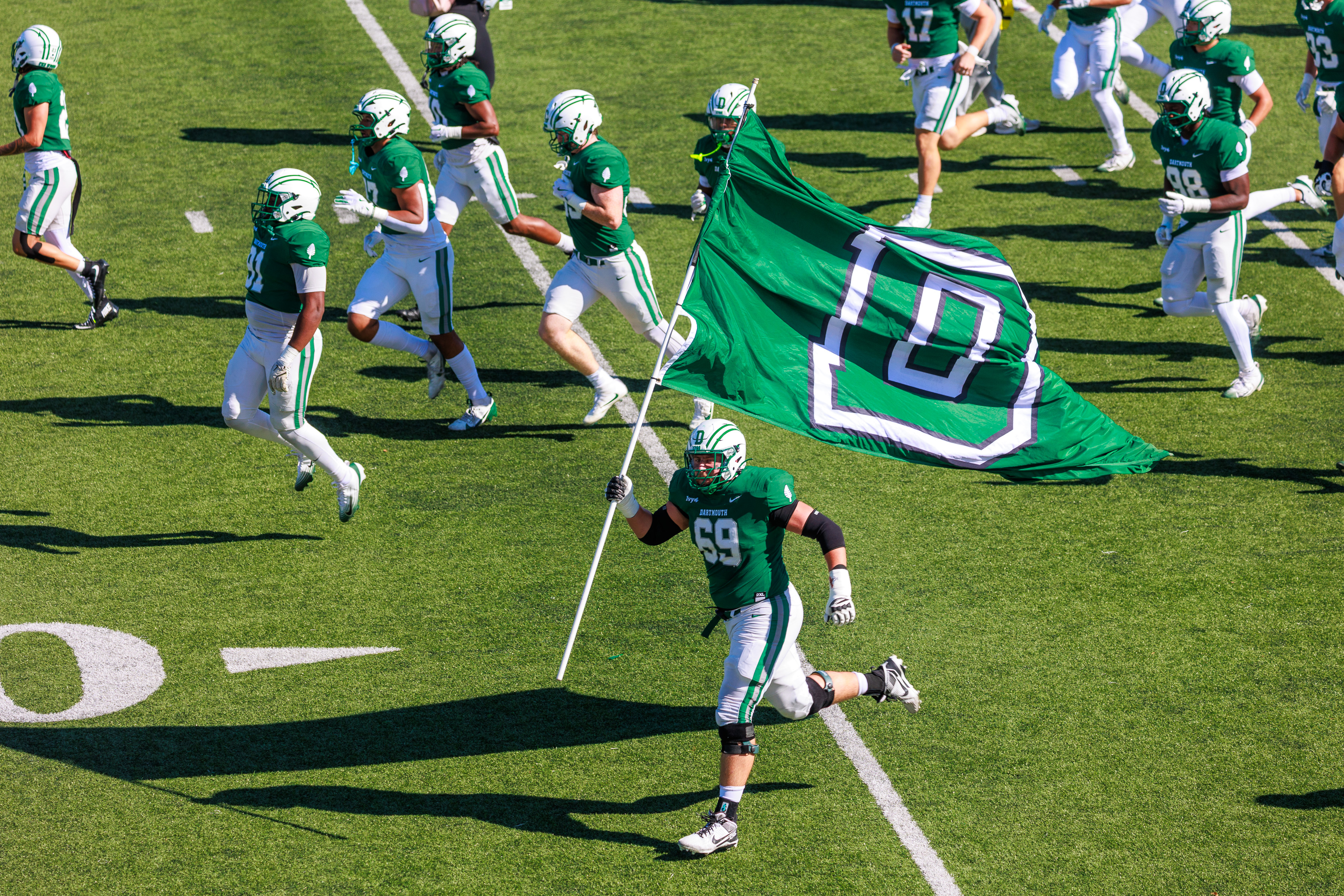
Konstantin Spörk carries the "D" flag in 2025

In March 2020, the Ivy League shut down all athletic competition due to the COVID-19 pandemic, including football. The league announced in a May 2021 joint statement that "regular athletic competition" would resume "across all sports" in fall 2021.

Upon the return of football, Dartmouth finished the 2021 season with a record of 9-1 and shared the Ivy League title with the Princeton Tigers. The Big Green failed to claim their third consecutive Ivy League title in 2022, posting a 3-7 record which saw them finish 6th in the Ivy League, their worst record since 2009.

The 2023 team was to be led by 23rd-year head coach Buddy Teevens, but Sammy McCorkle took over play-calling as interim head coach while Teevens recovered from injuries sustained on March 16, 2023 when a pick-up truck hit him while riding a bicycle in St. Augustine, Florida. Sadly, Teevens succumbed to his injuries, as the crash ultimately took his life on September 19, 2023. McCorkle was later promoted from interim head coach to permanent head coach on October 19, leading the team to a 6-4 record and a share of the Ivy League championship. The 2023 season was dedicated to Coach Teevens, and Coach McCorkle was named the 2023 Ivy League Coach of the Year.

== Championships ==
=== National championships ===
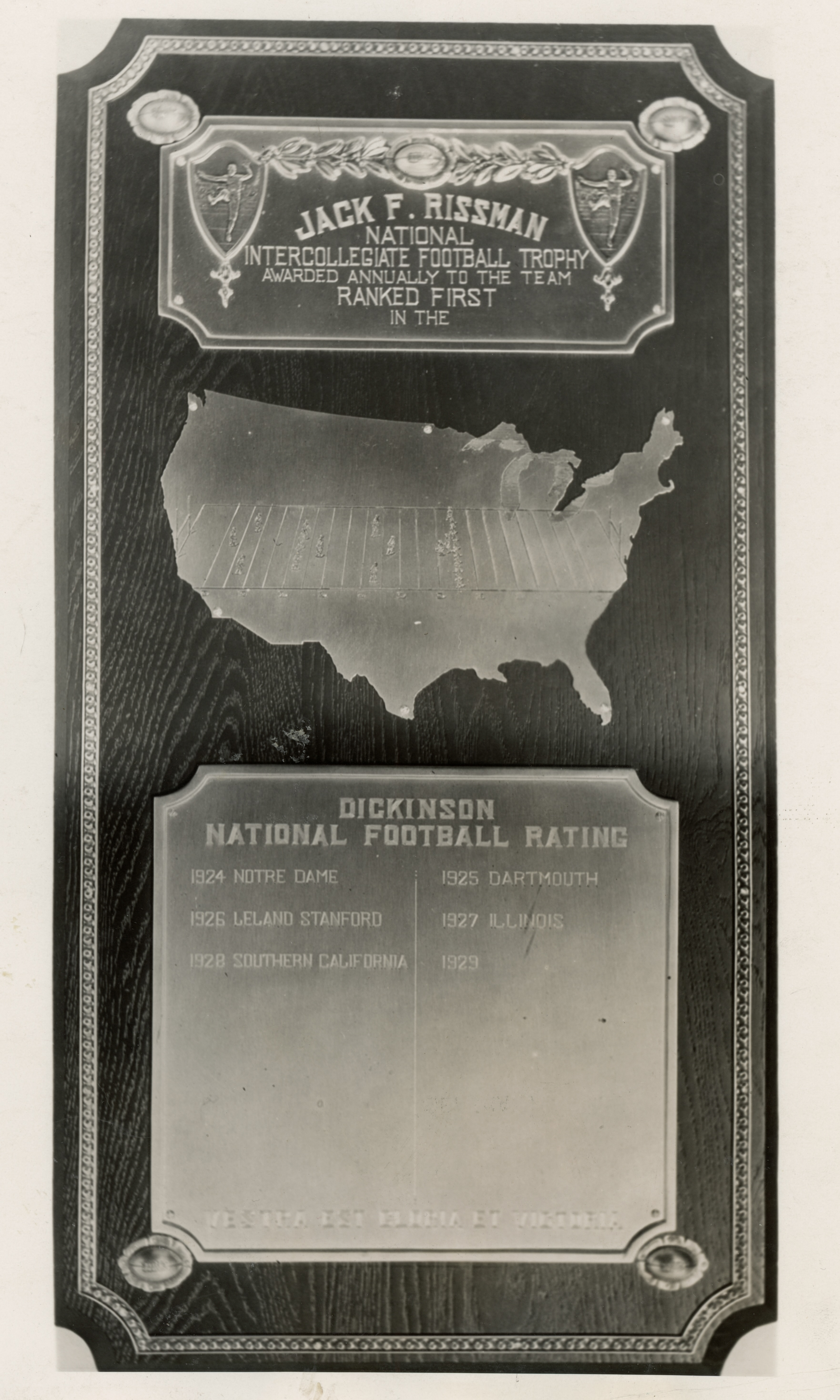
Jack F. Rissman Trophy awarded to Dartmouth for 1925 as Dickinson System national champions.

Dartmouth won its only national championship in 1925. Dartmouth claims this championship.

Year	Selectors	Coach	Record
1925	Dickinson System, Parke H. Davis	Jesse Hawley	8–0

=== Conference championships ===
Dartmouth has won 29 conference championships in over a century of play, with 22 in the Ivy League, the most in the league's history.

Year	Conference	Coach	Overall record	Conference record
1888	Eastern Intercollegiate Football Association	–	3–4	3–1
1889	Eastern Intercollegiate Football Association	–	7–1	4–0
1893	Triangular Football League	Wallace Moyle	4–3	2–0
1894	Triangular Football League	Wallace Moyle	5–4	2–0
1895	Triangular Football League	William Wurtenburg	7–5–1	2–0
1896	Triangular Football League	William Wurtenburg	5–2–1	2–0
1897	Triangular Football League	William Wurtenburg	4–3	2–0
1898	Triangular Football League	William Wurtenburg	5–6	2–0
1958	Ivy League	Bob Blackman	7–2	6–1
1962	Ivy League	Bob Blackman	9–0	7–0
1963	Ivy League	Bob Blackman	7–2	5–2
1965	Ivy League	Bob Blackman	9–0	7–0
1966	Ivy League	Bob Blackman	7–2	6–1
1969	Ivy League	Bob Blackman	8–1	6–1
1970	Ivy League	Bob Blackman	9–0	7–0
1971	Ivy League	Jake Crouthamel	8–1	6–1
1972	Ivy League	Jake Crouthamel	7–1–1	5–1–1
1973	Ivy League	Jake Crouthamel	6–3	6–1
1978	Ivy League	Joe Yukica	6–3	6–1
1981	Ivy League	Joe Yukica	6–4	6–1
1982	Ivy League	Joe Yukica	5–5	5–2
1990	Ivy League	Buddy Teevens	7–2–1	6–1
1991	Ivy League	Buddy Teevens	7–2–1	6–0–1
1992	Ivy League	John Lyons	8–2	6–1
1996	Ivy League	John Lyons	10–0	7–0
2015	Ivy League	Buddy Teevens	9–1	6–1
2019	Ivy League	Buddy Teevens	9–1	6–1
2021	Ivy League	Buddy Teevens	9–1	6–1
2023	Ivy League	Sammy McCorkle	6–4	5–2
2024	Ivy League	Sammy McCorkle	8–2	5–2

== Notable players ==
For a full list of former players, see Category:Dartmouth Big Green football players.

One alumnus has been inducted into the Pro Football Hall of Fame:

- Ed Healey (1914, 1916–1917, 1919)

Including Healey, ten alumni have been inducted into the College Football Hall of Fame:

- Murry Bowden (1968–1970)
- Frank Cavanaugh (1911–1916, as coach)
- Edward K. Hall (1892–1893, as coach)
- Myles Lane (1925–1927)
- Bob MacLeod (1936–1938)
- Bill Morton (1929–1931)
- Andy Oberlander (1923–1925)
- Clarence Spears (1912, 1914–1915)
- Reggie Williams (1973–1975)

== Future non-conference opponents ==
Announced schedules as of September 29, 2026.

2026	2027	2028	2029	2030
at Lehigh	at New Hampshire	New Hampshire	at Towson	Central Connecticut
Monmouth	at Central Connecticut			
Merrimack				
