= Triangular Football League =

Defunct American collegiate football conference

- Formerly: Northern Intercollegiate Football Association (1885–1886); Eastern Intercollegiate Football Association (1887–1891); New England Intercollegiate Football Association (1892)
- Founded: 1885
- Folded: 1901
- Sports fielded: College football

The Triangular Football League or New England Intercollegiate Football Association was an American college football conference. Its founding members were Dartmouth, Williams, and Amherst. The Triangular Football League was formed in 1892, and was a successor organization to the Eastern Intercollegiate Football Association (1887–1891) and the Northern Intercollegiate Football Association (1885–1886). MIT had been a member of the previous iterations as late as 1887, and Wesleyan became a member of the Triangular Football League by at least 1899.

== Football champions ==
- 1885 – Williams
- 1886 – Williams
- 1887 – Boston Tech
- 1888 – Boston Tech and Dartmouth
- 1889 – Dartmouth
- 1890 – Williams
- 1891 – Williams
- 1892 – Amherst
- 1893 – Dartmouth
- 1894 – Dartmouth
- 1895 – Dartmouth
- 1896 – Dartmouth
- 1897 – Dartmouth
- 1898 – Dartmouth
- 1899 – Wesleyan
- 1900 – Wesleyan
- 1901 – Williams

== See also ==
- List of Triangular Football League standings
- List of defunct college football conferences
- New England Small College Athletic Conference
