= Charles Dudley Daly =

American football player and coach, United States Army officer (1880–1959)

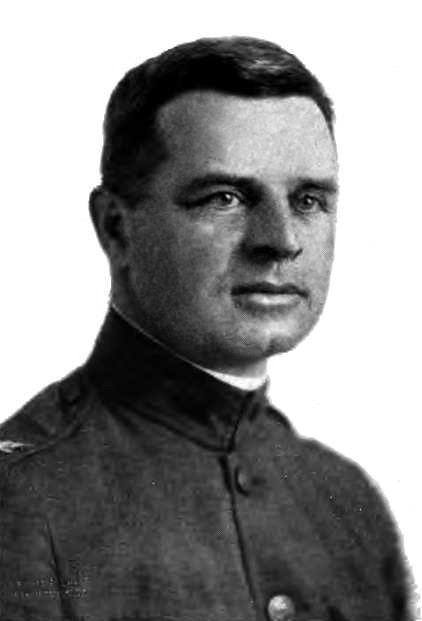

Biographical details
- Born: October 31, 1880; Roxbury, Massachusetts, U.S.
- Died: February 12, 1959 (aged 78); Pacific Grove, California, U.S.

Playing career
- 1898–1900: Harvard
- 1901–1902: Army
- Position: Quarterback

Coaching career (HC unless noted)
- 1908: Harvard (assistant)
- 1913–1916: Army
- 1919–1922: Army
- 1925: Harvard (assistant)

Head coaching record
- Overall: 58–13–3

Accomplishments and honors

Championships
- 2 national (1914, 1916)

Awards
- 4× consensus All-American (1898, 1899, 1900, 1901); Third-team All-American (1902)
- College Football Hall of Fame; Inducted in 1951 (profile)
- Military career
- Burial place: West Point Cemetery
- Allegiance: United States
- Branch: United States Army
- Service years: 1905–1906; 1913–1933
- Rank: Colonel
- Commands: 29th Field Artillery Regiment; 76th Field Artillery Regiment

Charles Dudley Daly (October 31, 1880 – February 12, 1959) was an American football player and coach and United States Army officer. He played college football as a quarterback at Harvard University and the United States Military Academy and served as the head football coach at the latter from 1913 to 1916 and 1919 to 1922, compiling a career record of 58–13–3. Daly was inducted into the College Football Hall of Fame as a player in 1951.

== Education ==
Daly attended Boston Latin School and Harvard University, where he was a member of ΑΔΦ, the Fly Club, the Hasty Pudding Club and editor of The Harvard Crimson for two years. An all-around athlete, Daly was a member of the Harvard varsity football team from 1898 to 1900. He led the team's offense during its undefeated 1898 and 1899 seasons and was team captain in 1900. He was a Consensus All-American in 1898, 1899, and 1900. He also competed on Harvard's Track and field, where he won the high jump at the 1898 and 1899 Harvard-Yale meets and the broad jump at an 1899 competition against University of Cambridge and Oxford in London. Daly graduated from Harvard in 1901 with an Artium Baccalaureus.

On the eve of the 1900 Harvard-Yale football game, Daly received word that he had been appointed to the United States Military Academy. In 1901, he led Army to an 11 to 5 victory over Navy. In that game he had a 95-yard kickoff return and kicked a field goal and converted one extra point. That same season he kicked a 50-yard field goal in a game against Yale. Army's only loss in 1901 came against Daly old team, Harvard, when Daly's successor as team captain, Robert Kernan, stiff-armed him en route to the game-winning touchdown. Daly was once again named to the All-American team in 1901. Daly graduated from West Point in 1905 and received the rank of 2nd Lieutenant.

Daly was inducted into the College Football Hall of Fame in 1951.

== Boston fire commissioner ==
In 1906, Daly resigned from the Army and returned to Boston, where he entered the bond brokerage business and served as an assistant football coach at Harvard. On August 18, 1910, Boston Mayor John F. Fitzgerald appointed Daly to the position of Fire Commissioner. He took office on September 16, 1910, following confirmation from the civil service commission. He was removed from office by Fitzgerald on January 26, 1912. According to Fitzgerald, Daly was dismissed because he had neglected to sign paperwork approving a pension for John J. Carney, a former member of the department, before the man died. Daly contended that the reason for his removal was political, stating that "there has never existed any honest or proper reason for the Mayor's desire to remove me from office...He wished promotions, transfers, appointments and contracts awarded in a manner which did not seem to be in the best interests of the city... The grossest administration would have been very acceptable provided the political machine could have milked the department for the countless favors it lives on". Daly opposed special pensions "as a matter of principle" and contended that Carney, who had not yet completed his probationary period, had not died as a result of anything related to his duties with the fire department (Carney contended that his illness was caused by getting soaked while putting out a fire and not being able to change into dry clothes for several hours).

Following his dismissal, Daly worked in the motor truck business.

== Personal life ==
On November 29, 1912, he married Beatrice Jordan. The couple would have five children. Their three sons graduated from West Point and their two daughters married West Point graduates.

== Military career ==
In 1912, Daly sought reinstatement into the Army through action of the United States Congress. Daly's reinstatement was strongly opposed by Representative James Michael Curley, who attacked Daly for having failed in his prior duties (specifically the matter of John J. Carney) and stated that Daly was only able to get a bill introduced through his Harvard connections. He was also opposed by Representative James Robert Mann, who disagreed with the practice of restoring officers to the Army and also criticized Daly's lack of success following his departure from the Army. Representatives Andrew J. Peters, Augustus P. Gardner Samuel W. McCall spoke on Daly's behalf, as did Representative William F. Murray, who had lost his chance for a West Point appointment to Daly. Army Chief of Staff Leonard Wood also supported Daly's reinstatement. The bill passed shortly before the 62nd United States Congress died and was signed by President William Howard Taft on March 4, 1913.

On April 1, 1913, the War Department ordered Daly to report to Fort Myer for temporary assignment. He then jointed the 5th Field Artillery Regiment at Fort Sill. Following his reinstatement, Daly served in a number of stations of the United States Army Field Artillery Corps, including Fort Sam Houston, Schofield Barracks, and West Point, where he served as head football coach.

A few months after the American entry into World War I in April 1917, Daly was attached to 338th Field Artillery, 88th Division, at Camp Dodge. He was promoted to temporary major on August 5, 1917, and attached to the 29th Field Artillery. He was later detailed to School of Fire at Fort Sill as instructor. On June 25, 1918, he was promoted to temporary lieutenant colonel. On October 24 he was promoted again, this time to the temporary rank of colonel and placed in command of the 29th Field Artillery.

After the war ended, he was appointed to the War Department General Staff, where he oversaw the transport and troop movements during demobilization. He was demoted to Regular Army grade captain Field Artillery on August 20, 1919, and detailed to the U.S. Military Academy as instructor. Daly was promoted to major effective July 1, 1920, and graduated from the Command and General Staff School in 1924. From 1924 to 1925, he commanded the 76th Field Artillery Regiment at the Presidio of Monterey. In 1925, Daly returned to Harvard as an instructor at the school's department of military sciences and assistant football coach. In October 1926, he was transferred to Honolulu. From 1928 to 1934, Daly was an Assistant Professor of Military Science and Tactics at West Point. He graduated from the Army War College in 1931 and was promoted to lieutenant colonel effective July 1, 1933. Daly spent his final years with the Army stationed in Washington, D.C., at the Army War College and the War Department.

On February 8, 1932, Daly suffered a heart attack at his desk at the United States Department of War in Washington. He retired from the Army on July 31, 1933, due to disability caused by heart disease. He retired with the rank of Colonel.

== Coaching ==
Daly was the head football coach at West Point from 1913 to 1916 and again from 1919 to 1922. Known as the "Godfather of West Point Football", he was coach to Dwight Eisenhower, Omar Bradley, Joseph Stilwell, Matthew Ridgway, James Van Fleet, George S. Patton and other American military luminaries of the 20th century. In 1921 he founded the American Football Coaches Association. He retired from coaching in 1925 after serving one season as an assistant coach at Harvard while on military assignment there.

=== Head coaching record ===
Year	Team	Overall	Conference	Standing	Bowl/playoffs
Army Cadets (Independent) (1913–1916)
1913	Army	8–1			
1914	Army	9–0			
1915	Army	5–3–1			
1916	Army	9–0			
Army Cadets (Independent) (1919–1922)
1919	Army	6–3			
1920	Army	7–2			
1921	Army	6–4			
1922	Army	8–0–2			
Army:		58–13–3			
Total:		58–13–3			
National championship Conference title Conference division title or championship game berth

== Death ==
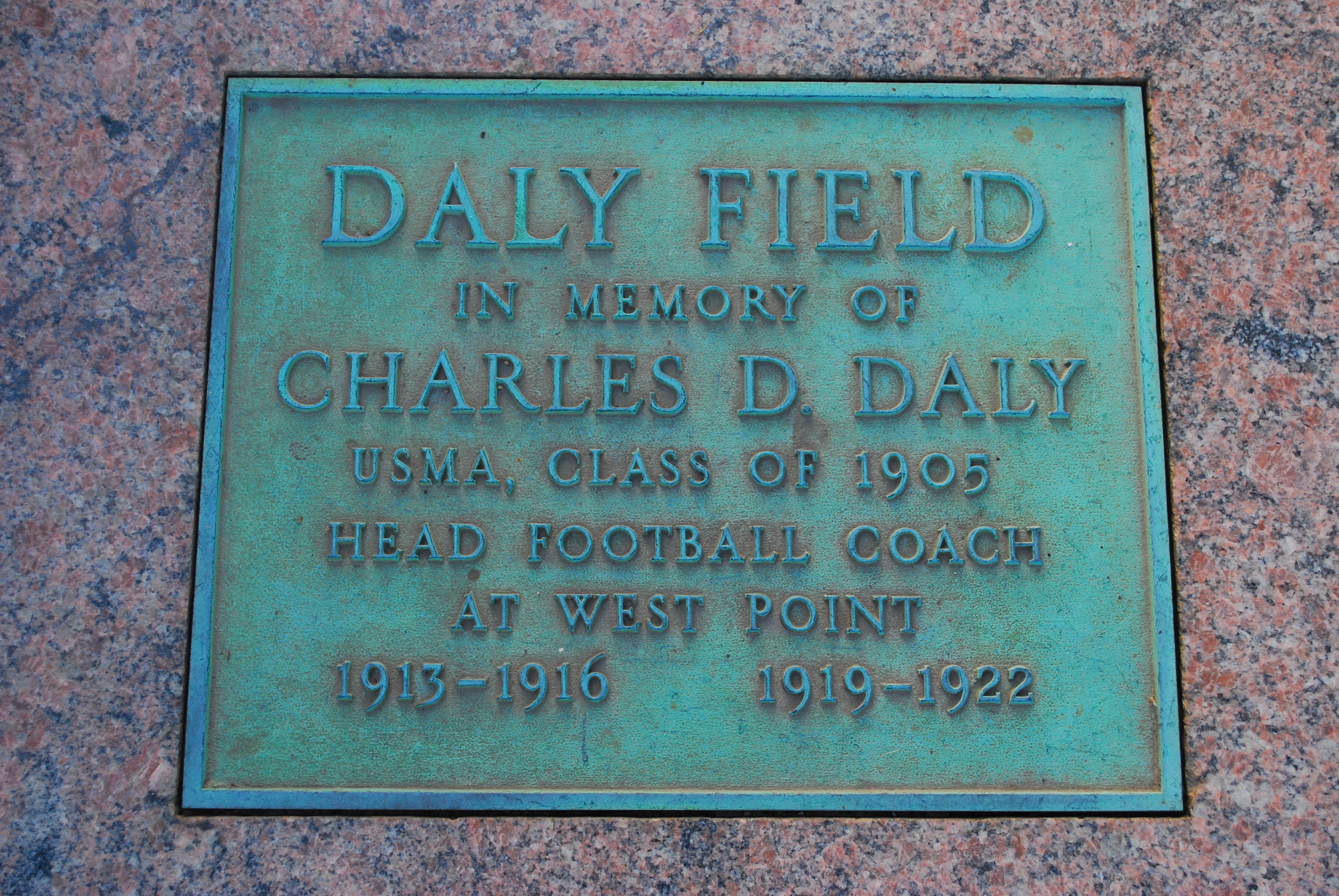
Daly field marker at West Point

Following his retirement, Daly moved to Pacific Grove, California. He died on February 12, 1959, at his home. He was survived by his wife and five children. His memorial service was held at the Post Chapel at the Presidio of Monterey and he was interred at the West Point Cemetery.

In 1963, the football practice field at West Point was named in Daly's honor.

== Works ==
- Daly, Charles Dudley (1899). A Harvard View of the International Games. OCLC 44606556.
- Daly, Charles Dudley (1921). American Football. New York: Harper. OCLC 1445510.
- Appeared in the film Daly, of West Point. 1902.

== See also ==
- List of college football head coaches with non-consecutive tenure

Fire appointments
Preceded by Samuel D. Parker	Boston Fire Commissioner; September 16, 1910–January 26, 1912	Succeeded by Charles H. Cole
