= 1898 All-America college football team =

College football honors

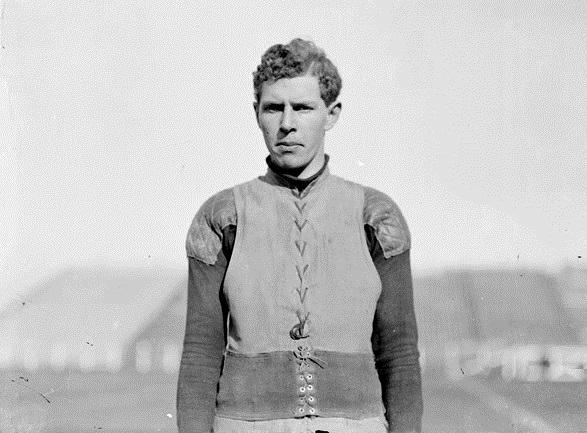
Penn guard Truxtun Hare also won the silver medal in the hammer throw in the 1900 Summer Olympics.

The 1898 All-America college football team is composed of American football players who were selected as the best players at their positions by various organizations that chose All-America college football teams that season. The organizations that chose the teams included Collier's Weekly selected by Walter Camp and the Syracuse Herald.

The 1898 season marked the first time players from the west were named to the All-American teams. Michigan center William Cunningham and Chicago fullback Clarence Herschberger were the first two western players to receive the recognition. Prior to 1898, all of the prior All-America football teams had been selected from among five Ivy League teams – Harvard, Princeton, Yale, Penn, and Cornell.

== Key ==
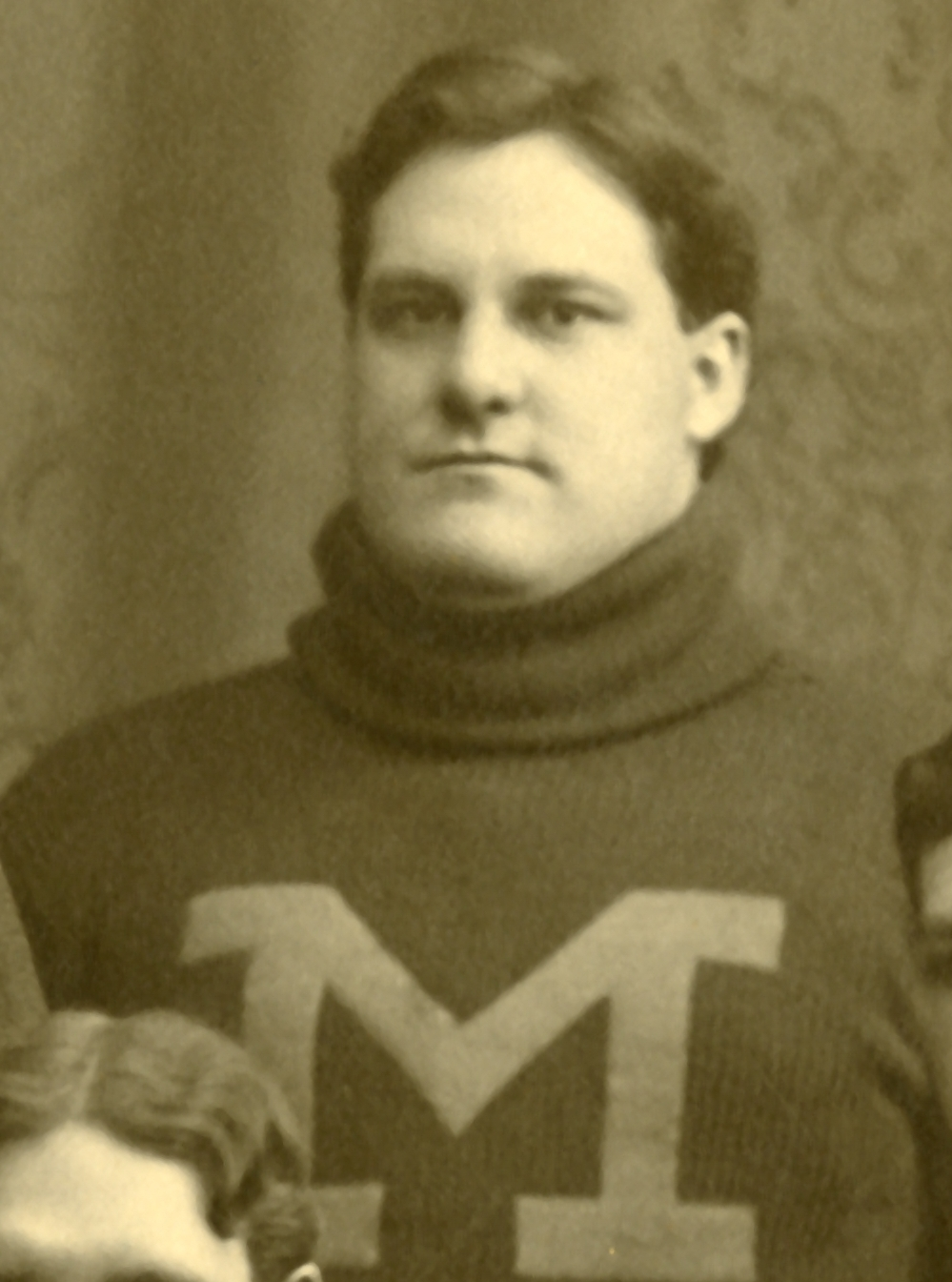
Michigan's William Cunningham (pictured) and Chicago's Clarence Herschberger were the first two players from western schools to be named to the All-America team.

- WC = Walter Camp for Collier's Weekly
- CW = Casper Whitney for Harper's Weekly
- H = Syracuse Herald, Syracuse, NY
- NYS = New York Sun, selected by Hugh H. Janeway, ex-Princeton player
- NYET = New York Evening Telegram
- OUT = Outing Magazine
- LES = Leslie's Weekly by Charles E. Patterson

Bold = Consensus All-American

== All-Americans of 1898 ==
=== Ends ===
- **Lew Palmer**, Princeton (WC-1; CW-1; NYS-1; NYET-1; OUT-2; LES-1)
- **John Hallowell**, Harvard (WC-1; CW-1; NYS-1; NYET-1; OUT-2; LES-2)
- N. T. Folwell, Penn (WC-3; H)
- Art Poe, Princeton (College Football Hall of Fame) (WC-2; H; OUT-1; LES-1)
- Francis Douglas Cochrane, Harvard (WC-2; OUT-1)
- Walter Smith, Army (WC-3)
- Chadwell, Williams (LES-2)

=== Tackles ===
- **Art Hillebrand**, Princeton (College Football Hall of Fame) (WC-1; CW-1; H; NYS-1; NYET-1; OUT-1; LES-1)
- **Burr Chamberlain**, Yale (OUT-1; LES-1; WC-1 [g]; CW-1 [g]; H [g]; NYS-1 [g])
- Percy Haughton, Harvard (College Football Hall of Fame) (WC-2; NYET-1; OUT-2; LES-2)
- Allen Steckle, Michigan (WC-2)
- Malcolm Donald, Harvard (OUT-2)
- Edwin Sweetland, Cornell (WC-3)
- Robert C. Foy, Army (WC-3)
- S. M. Goodman, Penn (LES-2)

Gordon "Skim" Brown of Yale captained the 1900 Yale football team which was referred to as the "Team of the Century".

=== Guards ===
- **Truxtun Hare**, Penn (WC-1 [t]; H [t]; NYS-1 [t]; NYET-1 [t]; OUT-1 [g]; LES-1 [g])
- **Gordon Brown**, Yale (College Football Hall of Fame) (WC-1; CW-1; NYS-1; NYET-1; LES-1)
- Walter Boal, Harvard (WC-2; CW-1; OUT-1)
- Josiah McCracken, Penn (WC-2; H; OUT-2; LES-2)
- Big Bill Edwards, Princeton (OUT-2)
- C. A. "Brute" Randolph, Penn State (WC-3)
- Daniel A. Reed, Cornell (WC-3; LES-2)

=== Centers ===
- **Pete Overfield**, Penn (WC-1; H; NYS-1; NYET-1; OUT-1; LES-1)
- **William Cunningham**, Michigan (WC-2; CW-1)
- Percy Malcolm Jaffrey, Harvard (WC-3; OUT-2)
- Booth, Princeton (LES-2)

=== Quarterbacks ===
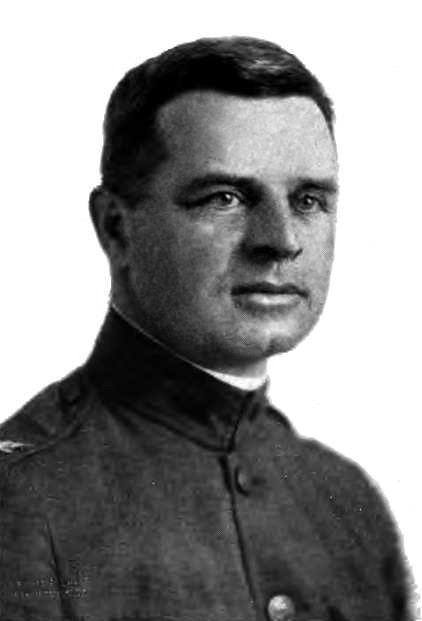
Harvard quarterback Charles Dudley Daly later served as Boston's Fire Commissioner.

- **Charles Dudley Daly**, Harvard (College Football Hall of Fame) (WC-1; CW-1; H; NYS-1; NYET-1; OUT-2; LES-1)
- Frank Hudson, Carlisle Indians (OUT-1)
- Walter S. Kennedy, Chicago (WC-2)
- Leon Kromer, Army (WC-3)
- Charles Street, Michigan (LES-2)

=== Halfbacks ===
- **Benjamin Dibblee**, Harvard (WC-1; CW-1; H; NYS-1; NYET-1; OUT-1; LES-1)
- **John H. Outland**, Penn (namesake of the Outland Trophy) (WC-1; NYET-1; OUT-1)
- **Malcolm McBride**, Yale (CW-1)
- Leicester Warren, Harvard (WC-2; NYS-1)
- Willis Richardson, Brown (WC-2; LES-2)
- Allen E. Whiting, Cornell (OUT-2; LES-2)
- Alfred H. Durston, Yale (OUT-2)
- Raymond Benedict, Nebraska (WC-3)
- Raymond, Wesleyan (WC-3)

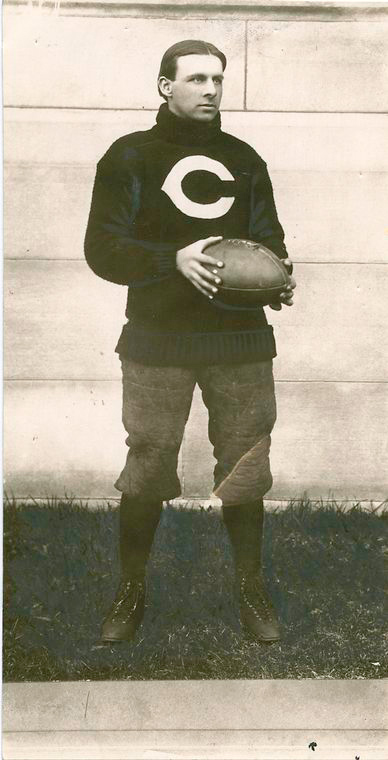
Clarence Herschberger of Chicago.

=== Fullbacks ===
- **Clarence Herschberger**, Chicago (College Football Hall of Fame) (WC-1; H; OUT-1; LES-1)
- **Charles Romeyn**, Army (WC-3; CW-1; NYS-1)
- Bill Reid, Harvard (H; NYET-1; OUT-2; LES-1)
- Pat O'Dea, Wisconsin (College Football Hall of Fame) (WC-2)
- Wheeler, Princeton (LES-2)

== See also ==
- 1898 All-Southern college football team
- 1898 All-Western college football team
