= Charles Romeyn =

Charles Romeyn may refer to:

- Charles W. Romeyn (died 1942), American architect
- Charles Romeyn (American football) (1874–1950), American football player and U.S. Army officer
