= Crawford Blagden =

American football player (1881–1937)

Profile
- Position: Tackle

Personal information
- Born: March 2, 1881; New York City, U.S.
- Died: January 11, 1937 (aged 55); New York City, U.S.

Career information
- College: Harvard University

Awards and highlights
- Consensus All-American (1901)

Crawford Blagden (March 2, 1881 – January 11, 1937) was an American football player. He played college football for the Harvard Crimson football team and was selected as a consensus All-American at the tackle position in 1901.

Crawford was born in 1881 in New York City. His grandfather, Luther C. Clark, was one of the founders of the banking firm, Clark, Dodge & Co. He attended Harvard University, where he played for the Harvard Crimson football team. In 1901 he was selected as a consensus All-American tackle. The 1901 Harvard team defeated rival Yale by a score of 17 to 0.

After graduating from Harvard, Blagden served as the line coach at Harvard under Percy Haughton. In 1914, with the outbreak of war in Europe, Blagden and Grenville Clark developed the idea to develop camps to train civilians for potential wartime service as officers. These camps at Plattsburgh, New York, became the Citizens' Military Training Camp. When the United States entered World War I, Blagden was trained at Plattsburgh and served as a lieutenant-colonel in the United States Army in France. In 1918, he led an advance by the 317th Infantry to rescue the survivors of the so-called "Lost Battalion" from the Argonne Forest in France.

After the war, Blagden worked for Atlantic Navigation Corporation and later for Joseph Walker & Sons, a stock brokerage company. He retired in 1932. Blagden was married twice. In 1911, he was married to Mary Hopkins, a granddaughter of Williams College president Mark Hopkins. They had a son, Crawford Blagden, Jr. His first wife died in 1912. In 1918, he married his second wife, Minna E. MacLeod of Nova Scotia.

In January 1936, Blagden died at the Harkness Pavilion of Columbia Presbyterian Medical Center after suffering an attack of influenza. He was 55 years old when he died.
