= 1903 Ohio State Buckeyes football team =

American college football season

1903 Ohio State Buckeyes football
- Conference: Ohio Athletic Conference
- Record: 8–3 (3–1 OAC)
- Head coach: Perry Hale (2nd season)
- Home stadium: Ohio Field

1903 Ohio Athletic Conference football standings
	Conf.					Overall
Team	W		L		T	W		L		T
Case $	5	–	0	–	0	8	–	2	–	0
Ohio State	3	–	1	–	0	8	–	3	–	0
Oberlin	2	–	2	–	1	4	–	4	–	1
Ohio Wesleyan	2	–	3	–	0	5	–	4	–	0
Western Reserve	1	–	3	–	0	3	–	6	–	0
Kenyon	0	–	4	–	1	2	–	6	–	1
$ – Conference champion

The 1903 Ohio State Buckeyes football team was an American football team that represented Ohio State University during the 1903 college football season. The Buckeyes compiled an 8–3 record and outscored their opponents by a combined total of 265 to 87 in their second season under head coach Perry Hale.

== Schedule ==
Date	Opponent	Site	Result	Attendance
September 26	Otterbein*	Ohio Field; Columbus, OH	W 18–0	
October 3	Wittenberg*	Ohio Field; Columbus, OH	W 28–0	
October 10	Denison*	Ohio Field; Columbus, OH	W 24–5	
October 14	Muskingum*	Ohio Field; Columbus, OH	W 30–0	
October 17	Kenyon	Ohio Field; Columbus, OH	W 59–0	
October 24	at Case	Van Horn Field; Cleveland, OH	L 0–12	
October 31	West Virginia*	Ohio Field; Columbus, OH	W 34–6	
November 7	at Michigan*	Regents Field; Ann Arbor, MI (rivalry)	L 0–36	5,000
November 14	Oberlin	Ohio Field; Columbus, OH	W 27–5	
November 21	Ohio Wesleyan	Ohio Field; Columbus, OH	W 29–6	
November 26	Indiana*	Ohio Field; Columbus, OH	L 16–17	
*Non-conference game
