= Thomas Graydon =

American football player (1881–1949)

Thomas H. Graydon
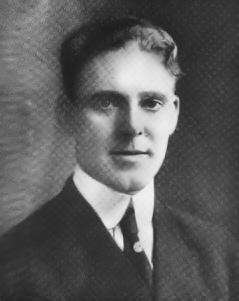

Profile
- Position: Fullback

Personal information
- Born: March 30, 1881; Cincinnati, Ohio, U.S.
- Died: October 1949 (aged 68) near Westfield, Indiana, U.S.

Career information
- College: Harvard University (1899–1902)

Awards and highlights
- 2× Consensus All-American (1901, 1902)

Thomas Hetherington "Blondy" Graydon (March 30, 1881 – October 1949) was an All-American football player. While attending Harvard, he was selected as fullback on the All-American teams of 1901 and 1902.

== Early life ==
Graydon was the son of Ann H. Graydon and Dr. Thomas W. Graydon. His father was a doctor in Cincinnati, Ohio who had emigrated to the United States from Ireland in 1868. Graydon's father later became a prominent Republican politician and manufacturer of patent medicines.

Graydon was educated in the private schools of Cincinnati and at St. Paul's School in Concord, New Hampshire, from which he graduated in 1899.

== All-American at Harvard ==
In the fall of 1899, Graydon entered Harvard University. He played fullback on the Harvard football team in 1900, 1901 and 1902. He was selected by Walter Camp as an All-American at that position in 1901 and 1902. His brother, Joseph Graydon, played end for Harvard.

In February 1902, Graydon gained publicity for his participation in a charity performance with the Barnum & Bailey Circus. Some Harvard athletes engaged in a burlesque polo match, and Graydon engaged in a tumbling routine while dressed "in resplendent pink tights."

== Marriage and professional life ==
Graydon married Helen Beryl Whitney, the daughter of San Francisco millionaire, J. Parker Whitney. The two became engaged when Whitney was between thirteen and fifteen years old and eloped in 1903. Their "Romeo and Juliet" romance, in which Graydon helped his bride escape from a New York boarding school, garnered national media attention. One Boston newspaper reported:

The young couple have known each other very well for years. The groom was a roommate of the bride's brother at Harvard; and the blonde fullback whose plays on the gridirons at Cambridge and New Haven were acclaimed by thousands of admirers, has long been known to the Whitneys as 'Tommy' ... She was about the age of 15 when she met and fell in love with 'Tommy' Graydon ... It was impossible from the first day for any observer not to see they were desperately in love with each other.

After the completion of his education, published accounts differ as to Graydon's professional career. According to contemporaneous press accounts, Graydon trained as a cobbler in Cincinnati after graduating from Harvard—hoping to learn the shoe business. He later became manager for a shoe company.

According to a later-published social history of Cincinnati, Graydon returned to Cincinnati after graduating from Harvard, where he accepted a position in the bookkeeping department of the Macdonald-Kiley Company. The latter publication states that Graydon was appointed as a vice president of the company after three years and as president of the company at age 28 in 1909. Under Graydon's leadership, the latter publication states that the company employed 200 men and 50 women and sold goods throughout the United States.

In 1909, the couple garnered national press attention again when Mrs. Gradyon sued for divorce, alleging that her husband failed to support her. One press account of the trial reported on the testimony of Graydon's wife and father-in-law:

Idleness, dissipation and neglect on the part of Graydon entered into her disillusionment, she explained, and he had allowed his business in Cincinnati to dwindle away until it did not bring enough revenue to provide for her support, she said. According to Mrs. Graydon, selling shoes proved less attractive to her husband than bucking the line of Yale in football scrimmages, and his experience as a business man was marked by none of the eclat that distinguished his career on the gridiron. Mrs. Graydon's testimony was short, and her only witness was her father, J. Parker Whitney, whose millions she will inherit. ... When asked about the character of his son-in-law, Whitney was too chivalrous to say anything to his disparagement. 'He's a really good fellow,' said Whitney, 'but as a business man he's impossible.'

On April 6, 1910 a decree of divorce was granted.

== Military service ==
When the United States entered World War I, Graydon enlisted and was sent to the Plattsburg training camp. After training he was commissioned captain of the 303rd Machine Gun Company, and was sent to Camp Devens. Graydon left for France on July 4, 1917, with the 76th Division. Later he was transferred to the 3rd Division and was placed in command of Company B of the Seventh Machine Gun battalion. He saw action at the Battle of Château-Thierry where his machine gun battalion bore the brunt of the fighting. After the Armistice was signed he became part of the army of occupation and was the first Harvard man to reach the Rhine. He returned to the United States on April 8, 1919 and received his honorable discharge.

== Later life ==
Graydon was married three times. His second wife was Mary Andrews, and his third wife was Marian MacAdams of New York City. He was married to his third wife for 20 years starting in 1929.

He was affiliated with the Episcopal church, the Business Men's Club, Harvard Club and Phi Delta Psi fraternity, which he joined in college.

Graydon and his third wife died when their automobile was involved in a collision with a passenger bus near Westfield, Indiana in October 1949 while the two were returning from Santa Monica, California to their home in New York.
