= 1900 All-America college football team =

Official list of the best college football players of 1900

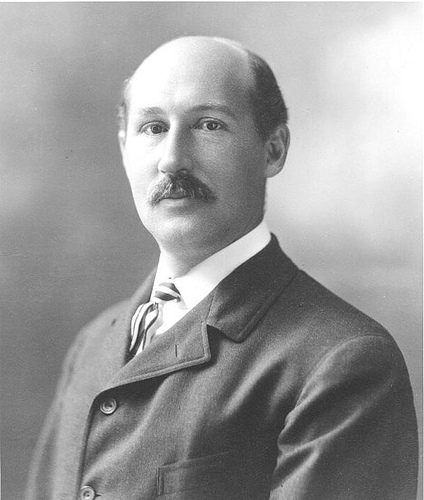
Walter Camp, one of two "official" All-America selectors in 1900

The 1900 All-America college football team is composed of college football players who were selected as All-Americans by various individuals who chose All-America college football teams for the 1900 college football season. The only two individuals who have been recognized as "official" selectors by the National Collegiate Athletic Association (NCAA) for the 1900 season are Walter Camp and Caspar Whitney, who had originated the All-America college football team eleven years earlier in 1889. Camp's 1900 All-America Team was published in Collier's Weekly, and Whitney's selections were published in Outing magazine.

== Consensus All-Americans ==
Gordon Brown of Yale

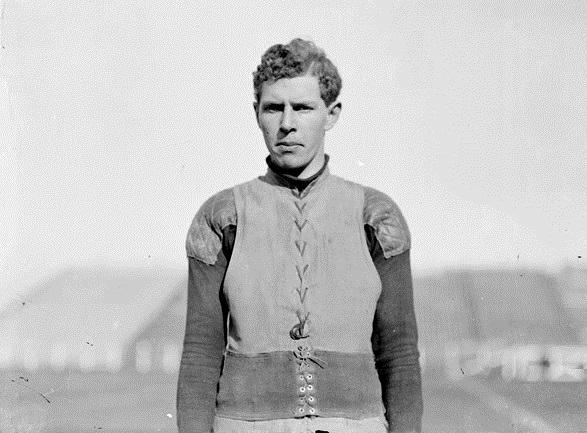
T. Truxtun Hare of Penn

In its official listing of "Consensus All-America Selections," the NCAA designates players who were selected by either Camp or Whitney as "consensus" All-Americans. Using this criterion, the NCAA recognizes 15 players as "consensus" All-American for the 1900 football season. The consensus All-Americans are identified in bold on the list below ("All-American selections for 1900") and include the following:

- James Bloomer, a tackle for Yale who later became a real estate broker specializing in the sale and rental of mansions on Long Island's "Gold Coast."
- Gordon Brown, a guard for Yale who was inducted into the College Football Hall of Fame in 1954.
- Dave Campbell, an end for Harvard who was inducted into the College Football Hall of Fame in 1958.
- George B. Chadwick, a halfback for Yale who later had a long career as a teacher of English, history and Latin at Eastern private boys' schools.
- Charles Dudley Daly, a quarterback for Harvard who was inducted into the College Football Hall of Fame in 1951. Daly later served eight years as the head football coach for Army, compiling a record of 58–13–3.
- William Fincke, a quarterback for Yale who later became a pacifist minister and educator and founded the Manumit School on his dairy farm in Pawling, New York.
- Perry Hale, a fullback for Yale who later became the head football coach at Ohio State University.
- T. Truxtun Hare, a guard for Penn who was inducted into the College Football Hall of Fame in 1951. In 2008, Sports Illustrated sought to answer the question, "Who would have won the Heisman from 1900-1934?" Its selection for 1900 was Truxtun Hare, a player who selected as a first-team All-American four consecutive years. Sports Illustrated noted: "Few early 20th Century players were as revered as Hare, who played every minute of every game."
- Bill Morley, a halfback for Columbia who was inducted into the College Football Hall of Fame in 1971. He became a prominent cattle and sheep rancher in New Mexico.
- Walter Smith, an end for United States Military Academy who spent more than 40 years in the United States Army, taught at West Point and the United States Army War College, served as chief of staff of the Army's 82nd Division, and reached the rank of Brigadier-General.

== Concerns of Eastern bias ==
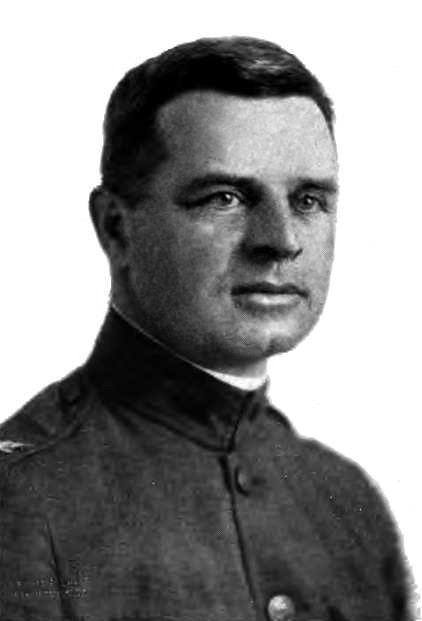
Charles Dudley Daly of Harvard

The All-America selections by Camp and Whitney were dominated by players from the East and the Ivy League in particular. In 1900, all 15 consensus All-Americans came from Eastern universities, and 13 of 15 played in the Ivy League. The Yale Bulldogs (Camp's alma mater) had seven players who were designated as consensus All-Americans. The only two consensus All-Americans from schools outside the Ivy League were Walter Smith of Army and Walter E. Bachman of Lafayette College.

The dominance of Eastern players led to criticism over the years that the All-America selections were biased against players from the leading Western universities, including Chicago, Michigan, Minnesota, Nebraska, and Notre Dame. No players from western schools received first-team or second-team All-American honors in 1900. Two western players were selected by Camp for his third team: Page, a fullback for Minnesota; and Clyde Williams, a quarterback for Iowa.

== Unofficial selectors ==
In addition to Camp and Whitney, other sports writers and publications selected All-America teams in 1900, though such lists have not been recognized as "official" All-America selections by the NCAA. The list below includes the All-America selections made by Charles Sargent for Leslie's Weekly and George W. Orton for The Philadelphia Inquirer. Only four players were unanimously selected by Camp, Whitney, Sargent, and Orton. They were James Bloomer, Gordon Brown, Truxton Hare, and end John Hallowell of Harvard.

== All-American selections for 1900 ==
=== Ends ===
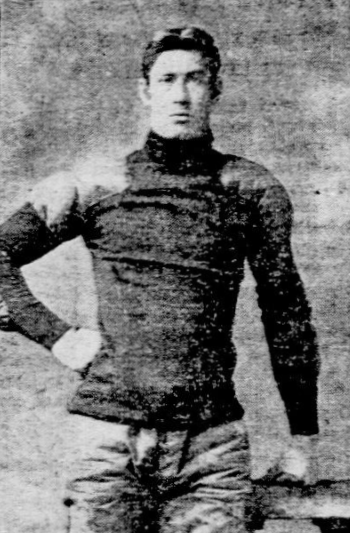
Dave Campbell of Harvard.

- **John Hallowell**, Harvard (WC-1; CW-1; GO-1; CS; IN)
- **Dave Campbell**, Harvard (College Football Hall of Fame) (WC-1; CS; IN)
- **Walter Smith**, Army (WC-3; CW-1)
- Sherman L. Coy, Yale (WC-2; GO-1)
- Charles Gould, Yale (WC-2)
- Solon Dodds, Wesleyan (CW-2)
- Neil Nichols, Navy (CW-2)
- Henry Van Hoevenberg, Columbia (WC-3)

=== Tackles ===
- **George S. Stillman**, Yale (WC-1; CW-1; CS; IN)
- **James Bloomer**, Yale (WC-1; CW-2; GO-1; CS; IN)
- Blondy Wallace, Penn (WC-2; GO-1)
- James Lawrence, Harvard (WC-2; CW-2; IN)
- Edward R. Alexander, Cornell (WC-3)
- Edward Farnsworth, Army (WC-3)

=== Guards ===
- **Gordon Brown**, Yale (College Football Hall of Fame) (WC-1; CW-1; GO-1; CS; IN)
- **Truxtun Hare**, Penn (College Football Hall of Fame) (WC-1; CW-1; GO-1; CS; IN)
- Jack Wright, Columbia (WC-2; CW-2; CS [c])
- Richard "Dick" Sheldon, Yale (WC-2)
- Trout, Lafayette (CW-2)
- John Teas, Penn (WC-3)
- Charles Belknap Jr., Navy (WC-3)

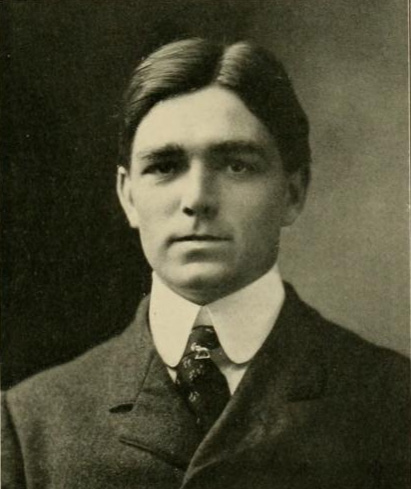
Herman Olcott of Yale

=== Centers ===
- **Herman Olcott**, Yale (WC-1; CW-2; GO-1; IN)
- **Walter E. Bachman**, Lafayette (CW-1)
- Charles Sprague Sargent, Harvard (WC-2)
- Leroy Albert "Bert" Page Jr., Minnesota (WC-3)

=== Quarterbacks ===
- **Charles Dudley Daly**, Harvard (WC-2; CW-1; GO-1; CS; IN)
- **William Fincke**, Yale (WC-1; CW-2)
- Clyde Williams, Iowa (WC-3)

=== Halfbacks ===
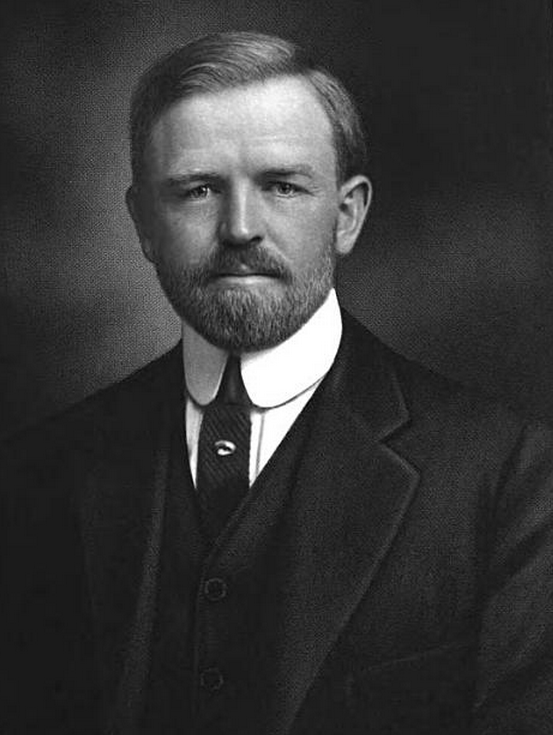
Bill Morley of Columbia

- **Bill Morley**, Columbia (College Football Hall of Fame) (WC-1; CW-1; CS)
- **George B. Chadwick**, Yale (WC-1; CW-1)
- George A. Sawin, Harvard (WC-2; CW-2; GO-1)
- Albert Sharpe, Yale (WC-3; GO-1; IN)
- Edward Hale Kendall, Harvard (CW-2)
- Harold Weekes, Columbia (College Football Hall of Fame) (WC-2; CS; IN)
- Howard R. Reiter, Princeton (WC-3; IN)

=== Fullbacks ===
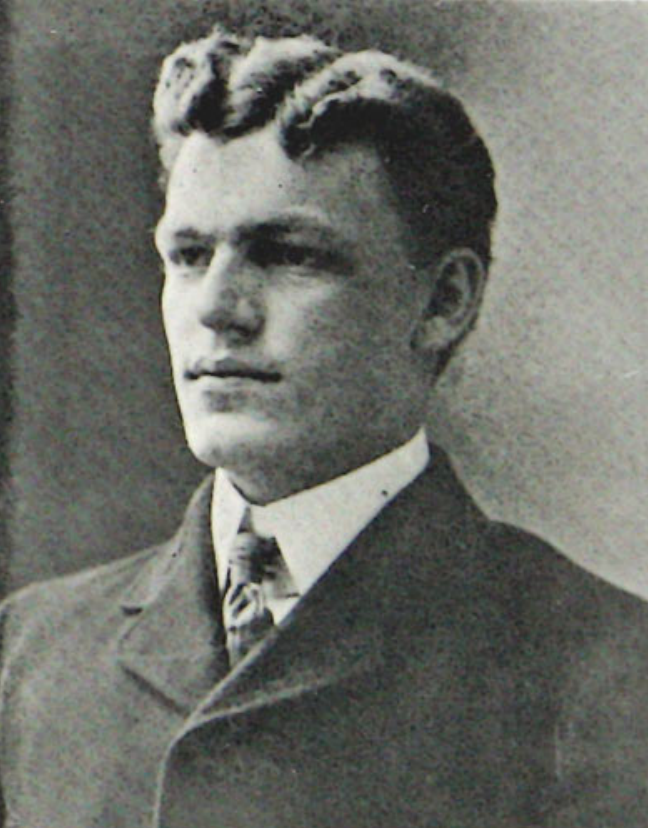
Perry Hale of Yale

- **Perry Hale**, Yale (WC-1; CW-1 [tackle]; CS; IN)
- **Raymond Starbuck**, Cornell (CW-1)
- Alexander James Inglis, Wesleyan (CW-2)
- Josiah McCracken, Penn (WC-3; GO-1)
- David Dudley Cure, Lafayette (WC-2; deemed "ineligible" by Whitney)

=== Key ===
- WC = Walter Camp published in Collier's Weekly
- CW = Caspar Whitney for Outing magazine.
- GO = George W. Orton in The Philadelphia Inquirer
- CS = Charles Sargent in Leslie's Weekly
- IN = The Inlander. Nine prominent coaches, from both the East and West, were asked by The Inlander to cast votes. The nine coaches were Dibble of Harvard, Woodruff of Penn, Pell (captain) of Princeton, Warner of Carlisle, Newton of Lafayette, King of Wisconsin, Robinson of Brown, Eckstorm of O.S.U., and Horne of Indiana.
- **Bold** = Consensus All-American

== See also ==
- 1900 All-Southern college football team
- 1900 All-Western college football team
