= Walter Smith (American football) =

American football player and military officer (1875–1955)

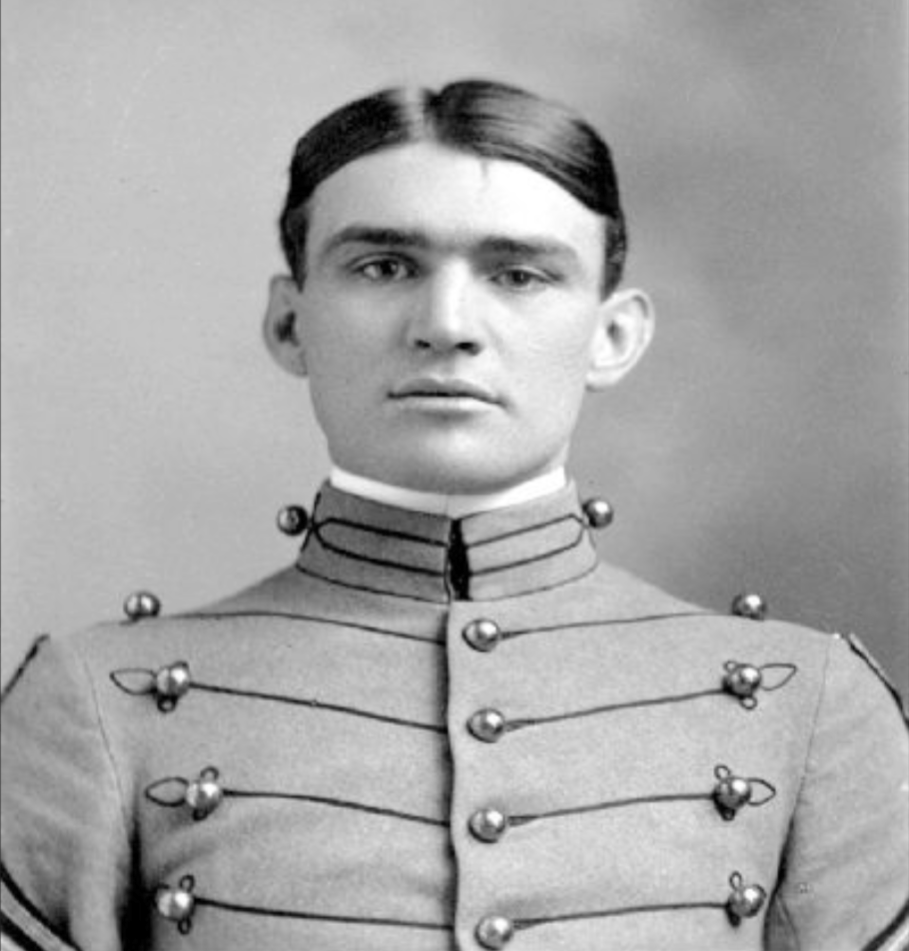
- Smith at West Point in 1901

Profile
- Position: End

Personal information
- Born: November 16, 1875; Cumberland, Maryland, U.S.
- Died: September 20, 1955 (aged 79); Walter Reed Army Hospital, Washington, D.C., U.S.

Career information
- College: United States Military Academy (1898–1900)

Awards and highlights
- Consensus All-American (1900); Third-team All-American (1898)

Other information

Signature
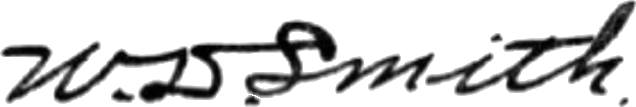

Walter Driscoll Smith (November 16, 1875 – September 20, 1955) was an American football player and military officer. He was a consensus All-American football player in 1900 while enrolled at the United States Military Academy. He served in the United States Army until 1946, reaching the rank of brigadier general.

== Early years and football ==
A native of Maryland, Smith attended the United States Military Academy at West Point, New York. He played college football at the end position for the Army Black Knights football team from 1898 to 1900 and was the captain of the 1899 and 1900 teams. He was a consensus All-American in 1900. He was also selected by Walter Camp as a third-team All-American in 1898.

== Military career ==
Insignia of "the All-American division"

Smith graduated from the U.S. Military Academy in 1901. After graduation, Smith remained assigned to the U.S. Military Academy. He served as an instructor of mathematics from 1905 to 1906 and assistant to the quartermaster from 1906 to 1909. He was stationed in Panama as the Constructing Quartermaster with the Panama Canal Commission from 1909 to 1913. He returned to the U.S. Military Academy from 1915 to 1917 as an instructor in tactics, assistant adjutant, post exchange officer, treasurer, and assistant quartermaster. In 1916, Smith was promoted to the rank of captain in the cavalry. In December 1917, he sailed for France and served as an observer with the British Army. In January 1918, he was assigned to the General Headquarters of the American Expeditionary Forces at Chaumont, France, serving as the Chief of Organization and Equipment Division. He was promoted to the rank of colonel of the field artillery in June 1918. Smith participated in major engagements at Champagne-Marne, Aisne-Marne, Somme Offensive, Oise-Aisne, St. Mihiel, and Argonne-Mueuse. He was awarded the Order of St. Maurice and St. Lazarus and was cited by the commanding general of the American Expeditionary Force "for exceptional meritorious and conspicuous services in Organization and Equipment, General Staff, France."

After World War I, Smith attended the Army War College, the General Service Schools, and the Naval War College. He served as the head of the Army's Transportation Branch, War Department General Staff, from 1924 to 1928. He was assigned to the Army War College as an instructor, director, and chief of the historical section from 1930 to 1935. From 1935 to 1939, Smith was the chief of staff of the Army's 82nd Division, nicknamed "the All-American division." He retired in 1939 and was recalled during World War II with an assignment to the War Department from 1941 to 1946. He reached the rank of Brigadier-General.

Smith died in 1955.
