= Walter Boal =

American football player and hammer thrower (1879–1955)

Walter A. Boal
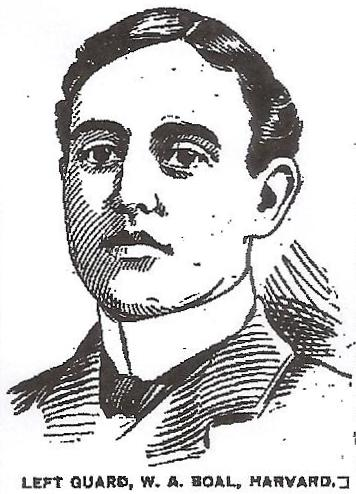
- Ink portrait of Boal, 1899

Harvard Crimson
- Position: Guard

Personal information
- Born: March 26, 1879; Chicago, Illinois, U.S.
- Died: 1955 (aged 75–76)
- Listed height: 5 ft 11 1/2 in (1.82 m)
- Listed weight: 195 lb (88 kg)

Career information
- High school: Harvard School of Chicago
- College: Harvard University (1897–1899)

Awards and highlights
- Consensus All-American (1898)

Walter Ayres Boal (March 26, 1879 – 1955) was an All-American football player and hammer thrower in the late 19th century. Boal played at the guard position for Harvard University from 1897 to 1899 and was selected as a first-team All-American in 1898.

== Football player ==
Boal was 5 feet, 11-1/2 inches tall, and weighed 195 pounds. A native of Chicago, Boal attended that city's Harvard School. After graduating from preparatory school, Boal enrolled at Harvard, where he played football for Harvard's varsity football team from 1897 to 1899. Boal was unlike most of the Harvard football players of his era, who were drawn from the ranks of the elite eastern preparatory schools. In fact, Boal was the only westerner on Harvard's varsity team in 1899, leading one writer to note that his appearance Harvard's lineup violated "a rule as unvarying as the law of gravitation."

In 1896, he played on the freshman team, and in 1897 he was a substitute on the varsity team and saw action in Harvard's 1897 rivalry game with Yale. At the start of the 1898 football season, sports writers credited Boal with being the only player on Harvard's line that the coaches could depend on. Though he played as a lineman, Boal was recognized for his ability as a "line plunger" (a term used at that time for those who ran with the ball and plunged into the line). In Harvard's 1898 victory over Ivy League rival Penn, Boal blocked a kick and even scored a touchdown after recovering a fumble. In 1899, the author of the syndicated newspaper column "Gossip of the Gridiron" wrote of Boal:

"Boal is on the Harvard team and will appear in the great contest with Yale, because he is one of the best men in the country. He never criticises, his words never appear in print, yet when there is do-or-die work to be done in the line, this physical giant is never found wanting. There is every prospect that most of the impressionable builders of the 'All-America' elevens will not hesitate to place Boal in the line of the theoretically strongest team."

Boal was noted for his unusual "erect manner of hitting the line"; one writer observed that the unusual technique had "worked some," but remained "a dangerous experiment." As the result of a leg injury, Boal did not perform as well in 1899 as he had in 1898 and did not make the All-American team as a senior. One writer noted, "Last year, he was very effective running with the ball, but this season his leg kept him out of the game for so long that he has had to work hard to get back into his old form."

== Hammer thrower ==
Boal also competed for Harvard's track and field team in the 16-pound hammer throw, an event in which he set the Harvard record. In May 1901, Boal placed second in the hammer throw at the national collegiate track and field championships. He had placed fourth in the event in May 1900. In July 1899, Boal traveled to England with a group of Harvard and Yale athletes for an international track meet against athletes from Oxford and Cambridge. Boal took first place in the hammer throw in England, leading one American paper to write that he "threw the hammer so well in England." Another newspaper reported that, in a demonstration of his strength while on the ship traveling to England, "Boal, the big Harvard guard, astonished the passengers one afternoon by skipping rope around the deck with Spitzer of Yale on his back, and Spitzer is no small man."
