= 1903 Case football team =

American college football season

1903 Case football
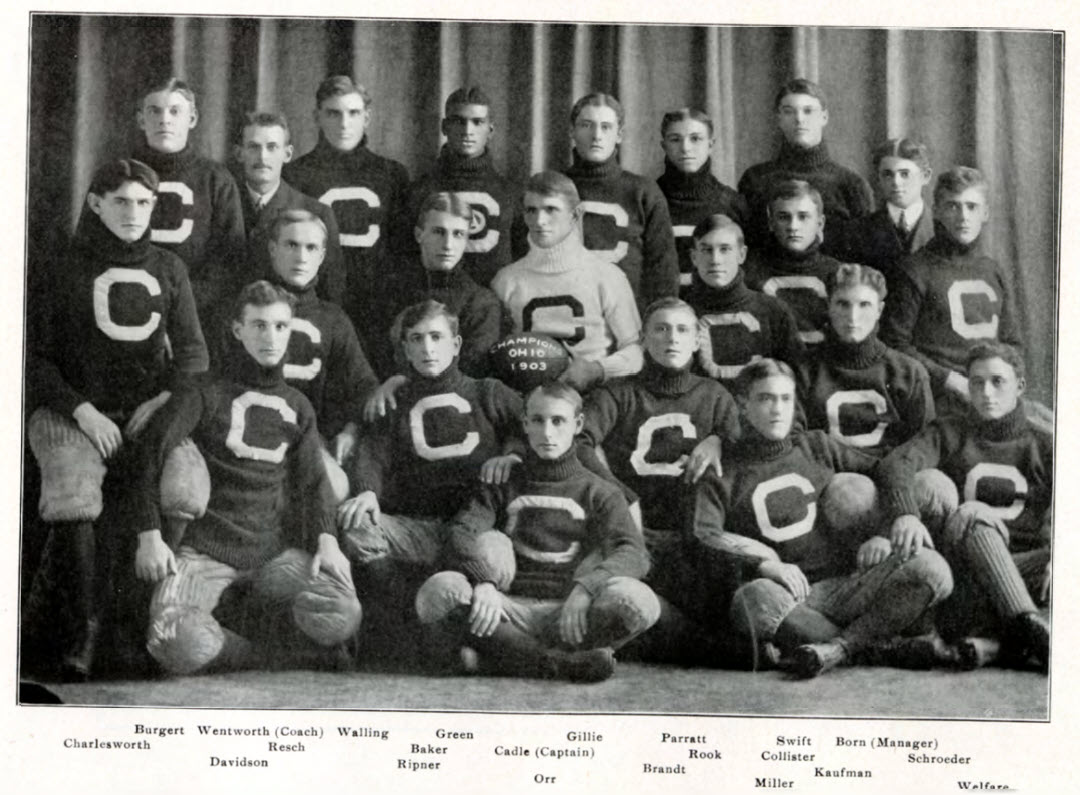

OAC champion
- Conference: Ohio Athletic Conference
- Record: 8–1 (5–0 OAC)
- Head coach: Joseph Wentworth (2nd season)
- Captain: Carl Cadle

1903 Ohio Athletic Conference football standings
	Conf.					Overall
Team	W		L		T	W		L		T
Case $	5	–	0	–	0	8	–	2	–	0
Ohio State	3	–	1	–	0	8	–	3	–	0
Oberlin	2	–	2	–	1	4	–	4	–	1
Ohio Wesleyan	2	–	3	–	0	5	–	4	–	0
Western Reserve	1	–	3	–	0	3	–	6	–	0
Kenyon	0	–	4	–	1	2	–	6	–	1
$ – Conference champion

The 1903 Case football team represented the Case School of Applied Science, now a part of Case Western Reserve University, during the 1903 college football season. The team's head coach was Joseph Wentworth. Case won its second consecutive Ohio Athletic Conference title.

== Schedule ==
Date	Opponent	Site	Result	Attendance	Source
October 3	at Michigan*	Regents Field; Ann Arbor, MI	L 0–31	2,000	
October 10	at Kenyon	Van Horn Field; Cleveland, OH	W 17–0		
October 17	at Allegheny*	Van Horn Field; Cleveland, OH	W 40–0		
October 24	Ohio State	Van Horn Field; Cleveland, OH	W 12–0		
October 31	at Oberlin	Oberlin, OH	W 16–5		
November 7	at Ohio Medical*	Columbus, OH	W 17–0		
November 14	Ohio Wesleyan	Van Horn Field; Cleveland, OH	W 29–6		
November 21	at Wooster*	Wooster, OH	W 40–0		
November 28	Western Reserve	Van Horn Field; Cleveland, OH	W 56–0		
*Non-conference game

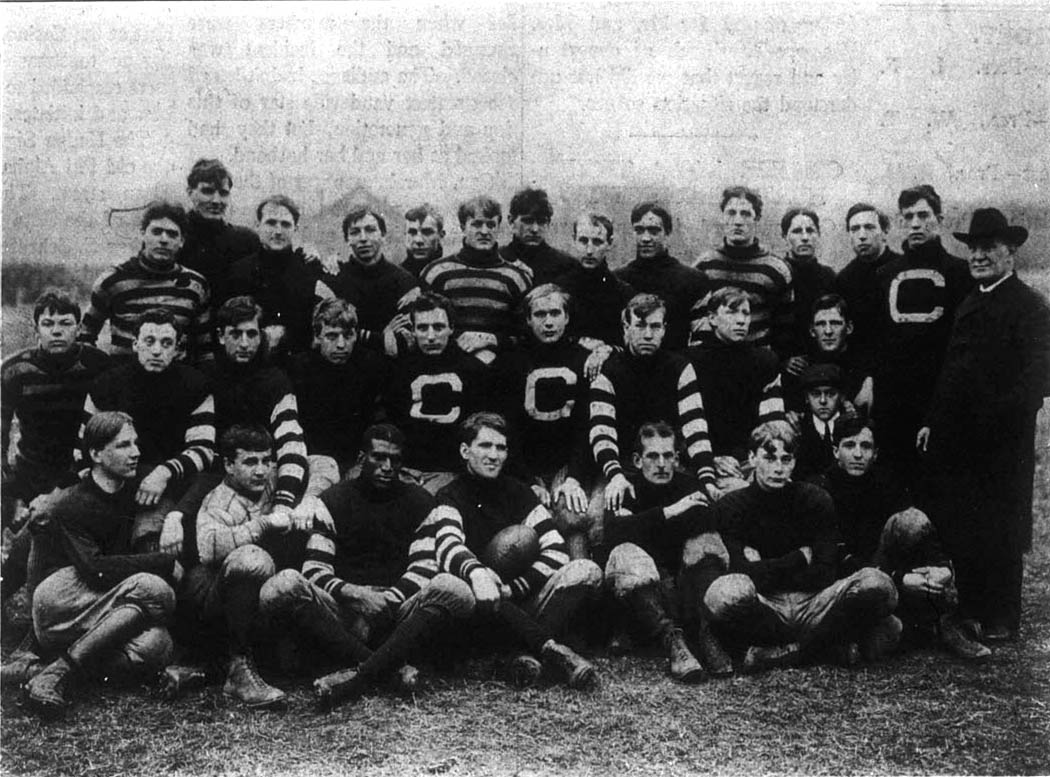
1903 Case football team after defeating Western Reserve - "Champions of Ohio."
