= Lew Palmer =

American football player (1875–1945)

Profile
- Position: End

Personal information
- Born: February 11, 1875; Adrian, Michigan, U.S.
- Died: March 24, 1945 (aged 70); New York, New York, U.S.

Career information
- College: Princeton (1898–1899)

Awards and highlights
- Consensus All-American (1898); Second-team All-American (1899)

Lew Russell Palmer (February 11, 1875 – March 24, 1945) was an American football player and expert on industrial safety and accident prevention. He played for the Princeton Tigers football team and was selected as the consensus first-team end on the 1898 College Football All-America Team.

Palmer was born in Adrian, Michigan, in 1875. He attended Grinnell College in Iowa. While at Grinnell, he set a western intercollegiate record in the half-mile run and was selected as an All-American in cross country. He subsequently enrolled at Princeton University. He graduated from Princeton in 1898 and remained for an additional three years to study electrical engineering. While at Princeton, he played for the Princeton Tigers football team. He was a consensus first-team honoree on the 1898 College Football All-America Team, and he was selected as a second-team All-American by Outing magazine in 1899.

After completing his studies at Princeton, Palmer went to work for Westinghouse Electric and Manufacturing Company in East Pittsburgh, Pennsylvania. He was one of the founders of the Association of Iron and Steel Electrical Engineers in 1907 and also served as that organization's president. He also served as president of the National Safety Council and held positions with the Lackawanna Steel Company in Buffalo, New Jersey Zinc Co., and the Jones and Laughlin Steel Company in Pittsburgh.

In 1913, Palmer became the chief inspector of the Pennsylvania Department of Labor and Industry. In November 1917, he became the acting commissioner of the same department. He was also the chairman of the National Committee on Industrial Safety.

In November 1918, Palmer became the director of safety and personnel for the Equitable Life Assurance Society. He remained with Equitable through at least 1940. In 1920, he was living in Yonkers, New York, with his wife, Vesta, and their daughter Christine. In 1930 and 1940, he remained living with his wife, Vesta (and in 1920 his daughter) in Yonkers and was employed as a "conservation engineer" by Equitable Life.

Palmer died in 1945. He was buried at Perry Township Cemetery in Stark County, Ohio.
