= Dave Campbell (American football) =

American football player (1873–1949)

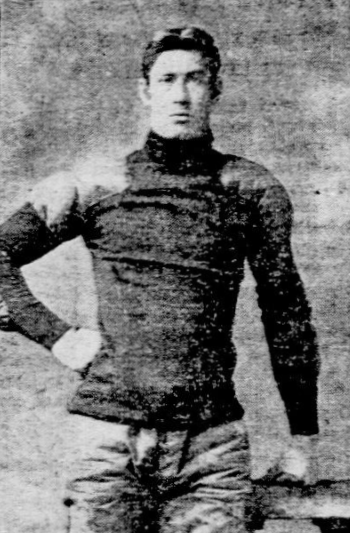

Profile
- Position: End

Personal information
- Born: September 5, 1873; Waltham, Massachusetts, U.S.
- Died: June 30, 1949 (aged 75); Cambridge, Massachusetts, U.S.

Career information
- College: Harvard (1899–1901)

Awards and highlights
- 3× Consensus All-American (1899, 1900, 1901)
- College Football Hall of Fame

David C. Campbell (September 5, 1873 – June 30, 1949) was an American college football player who was a member of the Harvard Crimson football team of Harvard University. Campbell was selected as a consensus All-American at the end position for three consecutive years from 1899 to 1901. He was the captain of the undefeated 1901 Harvard Crimson football team that finished 12–0. He was inducted into the College Football Hall of Fame in 1958.

Campbell was born in Waltham, Massachusetts, in 1873. He grew up in Worcester, Massachusetts, and played football at the Worcester Academy and Lawrence Scientific School. He enrolled at Harvard in his mid-20s and played for the Harvard Crimson football team from 1899 to 1901. As team captain, he led the 1901 Harvard team to an undefeated record and co-national championship. He was remembered as "one of the game's purest defensive stars in a pioneer era when defense dominated the competition." During his three years on the Harvard eleven, the team compiled a 32–1–1 record and recorded 26 shutout victories.

Campbell graduated from Harvard in 1902. With the outbreak of World War I, he worked in the manufacture of explosives in 1915 for the English and French governments. In 1916 and 1917, he manufactured flash powder for the United States government. When the United States entered the war, Campbell joined the Army and served in Europe with the 304th Tank Corps.

After World War I, Campbell worked as a mining engineer in North and South America. He later worked as an investment banker in Boston. He was affiliated with the Lever Brothers Company after retiring in the early 1940s. He died in 1949 at age 75 in Boston.

Campbell was posthumously inducted into the College Football Hall of Fame in 1958.
