= Gordon Brown (guard) =

American college football player (1879–1911)

Skim Brown
- Brown in a Yale uniform

Profile
- Position: Guard

Personal information
- Born: September 6, 1879; New York City, New York, U.S.
- Died: May 10, 1911 (aged 31); Glen Head, New York, U.S.
- Listed height: 6 ft 3 in (1.91 m)
- Listed weight: 192 lb (87 kg)

Career information
- High school: Groton (Groton, Massachusetts)
- College: Yale (1897–1900)

Awards and highlights
- 2× National champion (1897, 1900); 4× Consensus All-American (1897—1900)
- College Football Hall of Fame

Francis Gordon "Skim" Brown Jr. (September 6, 1879 – May 10, 1911) was an American college football guard who played for the Yale Bulldogs. He is one of only five players to have been recognized as a consensus All-American in four separate seasons.

Brown captained the 1900 Yale football team, which went 12–0, outscored its opposition 336–10, fielded seven All-Americans, was retroactively awarded the national championship, and was dubbed the "Team of the Century."

== Biography ==
Brown was born in New York City to Francis Gordon Brown Sr. and Julia Noyes Tracy. His uncle was J. P. Morgan.

Brown is one of four players in history to have been recognized as a consensus College Football All-American in four separate seasons. One of the other three players, Truxtun Hare, overlapped exactly with Brown's career; he played at Penn from 1897 to 1900. Ironically, they never played against each other in college; the Ivy League did not exist at the time. However, they played each other in high school. In their junior year, Hare's team won 6-0; in their senior year, Brown's team won 46-0.

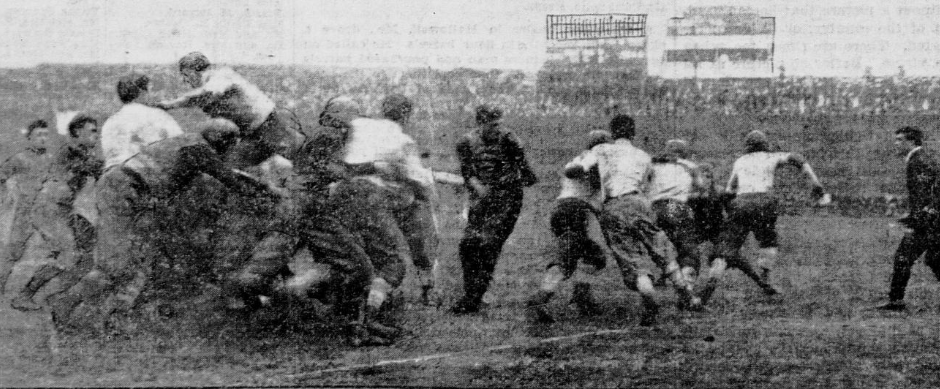
This photo records one of only two touchdowns that the 1900 Yale football team allowed all season. Yale defeated Columbia 12-5.

During his college career, Brown lost only four games in four years, going 37-4-3; the 1897 and 1900 teams were retroactively declared national champions. (Other selectors ranked Hare's 1897 Penn team as that year's national champion.) Brown captained the 1900 Yale football team, which was dubbed the "Team of the Century." It outscored its opposition 336-10 and fielded seven All-Americans. Although it did not play Penn that year, it dismantled Harvard 28-0 three weeks after Harvard handed Penn its only loss of the season. A possibly apocryphal, but often retold, story says that when someone asked Brown for the name of Yale's punter in 1900, Brown responded that he did not know because his team never needed to punt. (In reality, Yale's fullback Perry Hale, the future Ohio State head coach, took several punts in the Columbia game.) Brown was elected to the College Football Hall of Fame in 1954.

A powerful interior lineman, Brown played on both sides of the ball; after a particularly dominant showing in the 1900 Harvard-Yale Game, The New York Times wrote that Brown "is a whole team in himself." However, Brown was occasionally accused of dirty play during his Yale career; his high school principal once asked him about reports that he had instructed his team to commit holding penalties "if the umpire didn't see them." (Brown denied this.)

Brown graduated from Yale in 1901. An academic and social leader, he finished in the top three of his graduating class at Yale, was elected to Phi Beta Kappa, and was tapped for Scroll and Key; "he was noted for never missing an afternoon football practice or a 5 o'clock class immediately afterward." In addition to his football exploits, he coached Yale's freshman crew and was on the track team.

After graduating, he entered the banking business, working for his uncle at the House of Morgan. He developed an interest in community service and was active in the settlement movement in New York.

Brown died from diabetes at age 31, just ten years before the discovery of insulin. Two years after his death, his friends donated the Gordon Brown Memorial Prize to Yale University in his honor. The prize was initially awarded to the Yale junior who "most closely approach[es] the standards of intellectual ability, high manhood, capacity for leadership and service to the University set by Francis Gordon Brown." (The "high manhood" criterion was belatedly revised to "high personhood" after women's gymnastics captain Mindy Rosenbaum won the award in 1984.) In a biography of George H. W. Bush, who won the prize in 1947, one historian is quoted as saying (perhaps tongue-in-cheek) that "in practice the prize is awarded to an athlete who has a reasonably good grade point average."
