= George B. Chadwick =

American football player and coach (1880–1961)

- Chadwick from The New York Times', Oct. 1961

Biographical details
- Born: June 11, 1880; Brooklyn, New York, U.S.
- Died: October 17, 1961 (aged 81); Old Lyme, Connecticut, U.S.

Playing career
- 1899–1902: Yale
- Positions: Halfback, fullback

Coaching career (HC unless noted)
- 1903: Yale

Accomplishments and honors

Championships
- 2× National (1900, 1902)

Awards
- 2× Consensus All-American (1900, 1902); Second-team All-American (1901)

George Brewster Chadwick (June 11, 1880 – October 17, 1961) was an All-American football player and coach. He played college football for Yale University from 1899 to 1902 and was the head coach of the 1903 Yale football team. After working for a time in the hardware and sales fields, Chadwick had a long career as a teacher of English, history and Latin at Eastern private boys' schools.

== Early years ==
Chadwick was born in Brooklyn, New York, in June 1880. His father Charles Noyes Chadwick was the president of C.N. Chadwick Co., manufacturers of children's underwaists and boy's shirtwaists. His mother, Alice Ann (Caruth) Chadwick, was born in Northern Ireland. Chadwick attended the Froebel Academy, Brooklyn Latin School and Brooklyn High School.

== Yale ==
=== Student and athlete ===
Chadwick enrolled at Yale University in 1898. He played halfback for the Yale Bulldogs football team from 1899 to 1902. In December 1901, he was selected by his teammates as the captain of the 1902 Yale football team. He led the 1900 and 1902 Yale teams to undefeated seasons, and he was also selected as a first-team College Football All-American in 1900 and 1902. He scored all of Yale's points in a 12–5 victory over Harvard in 1902 on runs of 53 and 55 yards.

In his book, "The History of American Football," Allison Danzig referred to Chadwick as "the phantom line cleaver." While playing football at Yale, Chadwick was 5 feet 10 inches in height, and weighed 155 pounds. In 1951, Chadwick recalled the Yale teams on which he played, noting that "our game was not as intricate or deceptive as it is today" but that the old game "had precision."

While attending Yale, Chadwick was also a member of the University Glee Club, Psi Upsilon, and Skull and Bones.

=== Coach ===
After graduating as part of Yale's class of 1903, Chadwick agreed to return as the school's head football coach in the fall of 1903. Chadwick coached the 1903 Yale football team to an 11–1 record, outscoring opponents 312 to 26. The 1903 team's only loss came against Princeton by a score of 11–6.

During the period from 1899 to 1912, Yale had 14 different head football coaches in 14 years – despite compiling a combined record of 127–11–10 in those years. During that 14-year span, the Yale football team has also been recognized as the national championship team by one or more of the major national championship selectors on seven occasions – 1900 (Billingsley, Helms, Houlgate, National Championship Foundation, Parke Davis), 1901 (Parke Davis), 1902 (Parke Davis), 1905 (Parke Davis, Whitney), 1906 (Billingsley, Parke Davis, Whitney), 1907 (Billingsley, Helms, Houlgate, National Championship Foundation, Parke Davis, Whitney), and 1909 (Billingsley, Helms, Houlgate, National Championship Foundation, Parke Davis).

== Later years ==
At the conclusion of the 1903 football season, Chadwick accepted a position with the Southern Railroad Company, St. Louis and Louisville Division. He held positions with that company in Princeton, Indiana, and East St. Louis, Illinois. In August 1904, he became employed by the Simmons Hardware Company in St. Louis, Missouri.

At the time of the 1910 United States census, Chadwick was living with his parents in Brooklyn and working as a salesman for a roofing concern.

As of 1917, Chadwick was reported to be employed by The Patterson Manufacturing Company of Toronto, Ontario, Canada. In a draft registration card completed by Chadwick in September 1918, he indicated that he was living in Manhattan, New York City, and working as a sales manager for Barrett Manufacturing Company, manufacturers of road-building materials.

During World War I, Chadwick served in the U.S. Army and achieved the rank of captain. After the war, he worked as the editor of a Red Cross magazine.

At some point after 1918, Chadwick became a school teacher. He taught English, history and Latin at various private boys' schools. At the time of the 1930 United States census, Chadwick was living in Ridgefield, Connecticut, working as a teacher in a private school.

In 1927, he published his only book - Chuck Blue of Sterling - a story of college life and football. (New York: The Century Co.)

In a draft registration card completed by Chadwick at the time of World War II, Chadwick indicated that he was residing at the Kent School, a private preparatory school located in Kent, Connecticut.

Chadwick died in October 1961 at his home on Ferry Road in Old Lyme, Connecticut, at age 81.

== Head coaching record ==
Year	Team	Overall	Conference	Standing	Bowl/playoffs
Yale Bulldogs (Independent) (1903)
1903	Yale	11–1			
Yale:		11–1			
Total:		11–1			
