= 1901 All-America college football team =

Official list of the best college football players of 1901

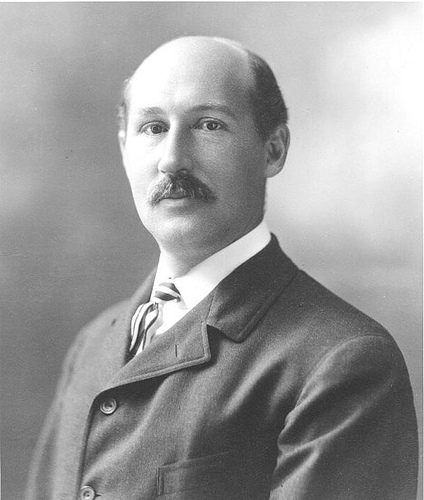
Walter Camp, one of two "official" All-America selectors in 1901

The 1901 All-America college football team is composed of college football players who were selected as All-Americans by various individuals who chose All-America college football teams for the 1901 college football season. The only two individuals who have been recognized as "official" selectors by the National Collegiate Athletic Association (NCAA) for the 1901 season are Walter Camp and Caspar Whitney, who had originated the College Football All-America Team 13 years earlier in 1889. Camp's 1901 All-America Team was published in Collier's Weekly, and Whitney's selections were published in Outing magazine.

== Consensus All-Americans ==
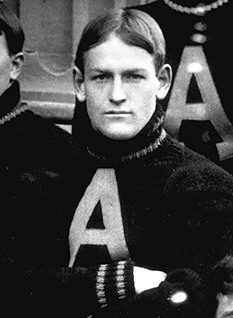
Paul Bunker of Army

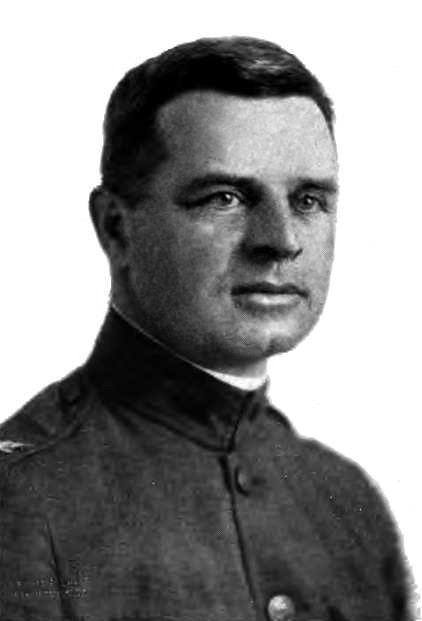
Charles Dudley Daly of Army

In its official listing of "Consensus All-America Selections," the NCAA designates players who were selected by either Camp or Whitney as "consensus" All-Americans. Using this criterion, the NCAA recognizes 18 players as "consensus" All-American for the 1901 football season. The consensus All-Americans are identified in bold on the list below ("All-Americans of 1901") and include the following:

- Edward Bowditch, an end from Harvard who later had a distinguished military and diplomatic career, including stints as Secretary and Vice Governor of Moro Province in the Philippines, aide-de-camp to Gen. John J. Pershing during World War I, inspector general of the New York National Guard, and as a member of the Harbord Commission and the Wood-Forbes Mission.
- Paul Bunker, a tackle for Army whose posthumously published account of his time as a Japanese prisoner of war became a best-seller. A portion of the U.S. flag flown at Corregidor was saved from burning by Bunker and kept hidden as a patch inside his shirt; the patch remains on display in the West Point museum.
- Dave Campbell, an end for Harvard who was inducted into the College Football Hall of Fame in 1958.
- Charles Dudley Daly, a quarterback for Harvard who was inducted into the College Football Hall of Fame in 1951. In 2008, Sports Illustrated sought to answer the question, "Who would have won the Heisman from 1900-1934?" Its selection for 1901 was Daly of Army, a player who put on "a one-man show" against Navy, scoring all 11 of Army's points.
- Bill Morley, a halfback for Columbia who was inducted into the College Football Hall of Fame in 1971. He became a prominent cattle and sheep rancher in New Mexico.
- Neil Snow, an end for Michigan who scored five touchdowns in the 1902 Rose Bowl and was inducted into the College Football Hall of Fame in 1960.
- Bill Warner, a guard for Cornell who was inducted into the College Football Hall of Fame in 1971. Warner later served as the head football coach at Cornell, North Carolina, Colgate, St. Louis, and Oregon.
- Harold Weekes, a halfback for Columbia who was inducted into the College Football Hall of Fame in 1954.

== Concerns of Eastern bias ==
The All-America selections by Camp and Whitney were dominated by players from the East and the Ivy League in particular. In 1901, 17 of the 18 consensus All-Americans came from Eastern universities, and 14 of 18 played in the Ivy League. The undefeated Harvard Crimson team had eight players who were designated as consensus All-Americans. The only four consensus All-Americans from schools outside the Ivy League were Neil Snow of Michigan, Paul Bunker and Charles Dudley Daly of Army, and Walter Bachman of Lafayette.

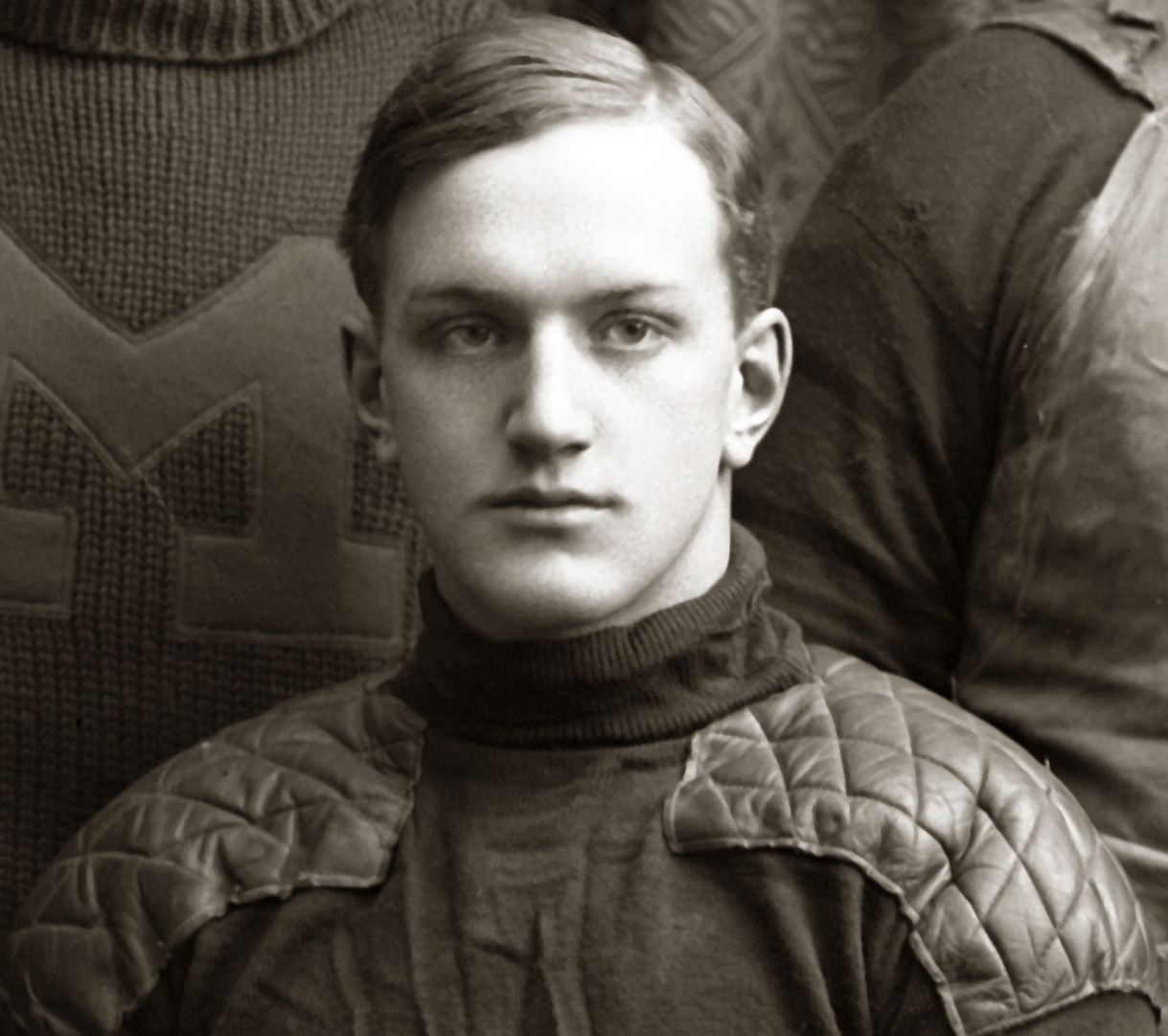
Neil Snow of Michigan

The dominance of Eastern players led to criticism over the years that the All-America selections were biased against players from the leading Western universities, including Chicago, Michigan, Minnesota, Wisconsin, and Notre Dame. During the 1901 season, Fielding H. Yost's "Point-a-Minute" team at Michigan compiled an 11–0 record and outscored its opponents by the unprecedented total of 550 to 0. Four Michigan players were chosen for All-Western teams: end Neil Snow, halfback Willie Heston, quarterback Boss Weeks, and tackle Bruce Shorts. Another strong team from the West was Wisconsin which compiled a 9–0 record and outscored opponents 316 to 0. Yet, only one player from a western school, Snow of Michigan, was recognized as a first-team All-American in 1901. Caspar Whitney named two Wisconsin players, tackle Art Curtis and halfback Al "Norsky" Larson, as second-team All-Americans.

== Unofficial selectors ==
In addition to Camp and Whitney, other sports writers and publications selected All-America teams in 1901, though such lists have not been recognized as "official" All-America selections by the NCAA. The list below includes the All-America selections made by the New York Post and The Philadelphia Inquirer. Only four players were unanimously selected by Camp, Whitney, the New York Post, and The Philadelphia Inquirer. They were Dave Campbell, Oliver Cutts, Charles Dudley Daly, and Robert Kernan.

== All-Americans of 1901 ==
=== Ends ===
- **Dave Campbell**, Harvard (College Football Hall of Fame) (WC-1; CW-2; NYP-1; PI-1)
- **Ralph Tipton Davis**, Princeton (WC-1; CW-2; NYP-2; PI-1)
- **Edward Bowditch**, Harvard (WC-2; CW-1; NYP-1)
- **Neil Snow**, Michigan (College Football Hall of Fame) (CW-1)
- Joseph R. Swan, Yale (WC-2; NYP-2)
- Howard Henry, Princeton (WC-3)
- Charley Gould, Yale (WC-3)

=== Tackles ===
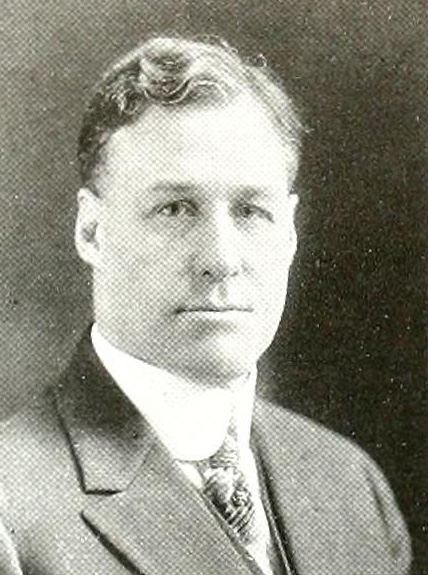
Oliver Cutts of Harvard

- **Oliver Cutts**, Harvard (WC-1; CW-1; NYP-1; PI-1)
- **Paul Bunker**, Army (College Football Hall of Fame) (WC-1; CW-2; NYP-1)
- **Crawford Blagden**, Harvard (WC-2; CW-1; NYP-2)
- Williamson Pell, Princeton (WC-3; NYP-2)
- James Hogan, Yale (PI-1)
- Arthur Curtis, Wisconsin (CW-2)
- George Goss, Yale (WC-3)

=== Guards ===
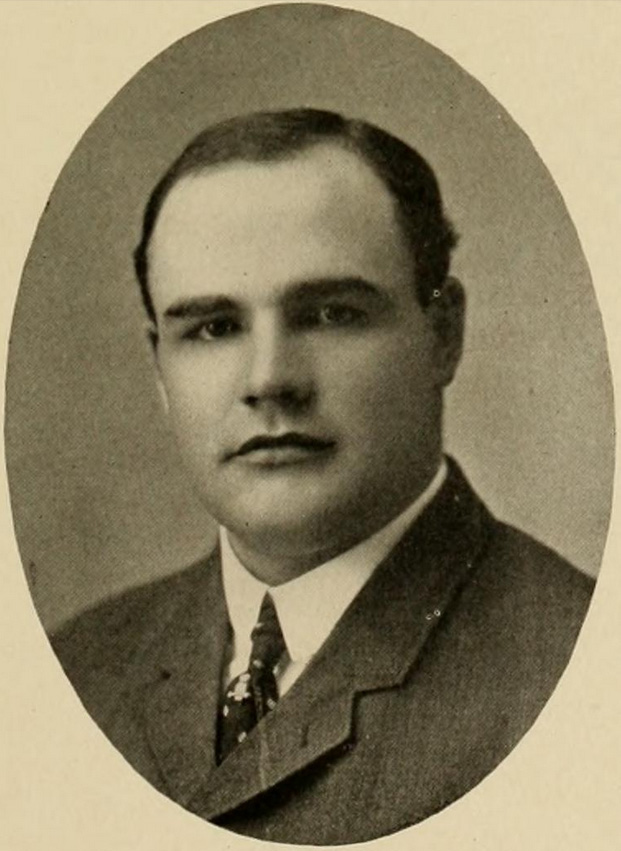
Bill Warner of Cornell

- **Bill Warner**, Cornell (College Football Hall of Fame) (WC-1; NYP-1; PI-1)
- **William George Lee**, Harvard (WC-1; CW-2; NYP-2)
- **Charles A. Barnard**, Harvard (WC-2; CW-1)
- **Sanford Hunt**, Cornell (WC-2; CW-1)
- Herman Olcott, Yale (WC-3; NYP-1)
- Martin Wheelock, Carlisle (WC-2 [as T], PI-1)
- J. F. Dana, Princeton (NYP-2)
- M. F. Mills, Princeton (CW-2)
- John Teas, Penn (WC-3)

=== Centers ===
- **Henry Holt**, Yale (WC-1; CW-2; NYP-1)
- **Walter E. Bachman**, Lafayette (WC-2; CW-1)
- Charles Sprague Sargent, Harvard (PI-1)
- Elbridge Howe Green, Harvard (NYP-2)
- Hubert Fisher, Princeton (WC-3)

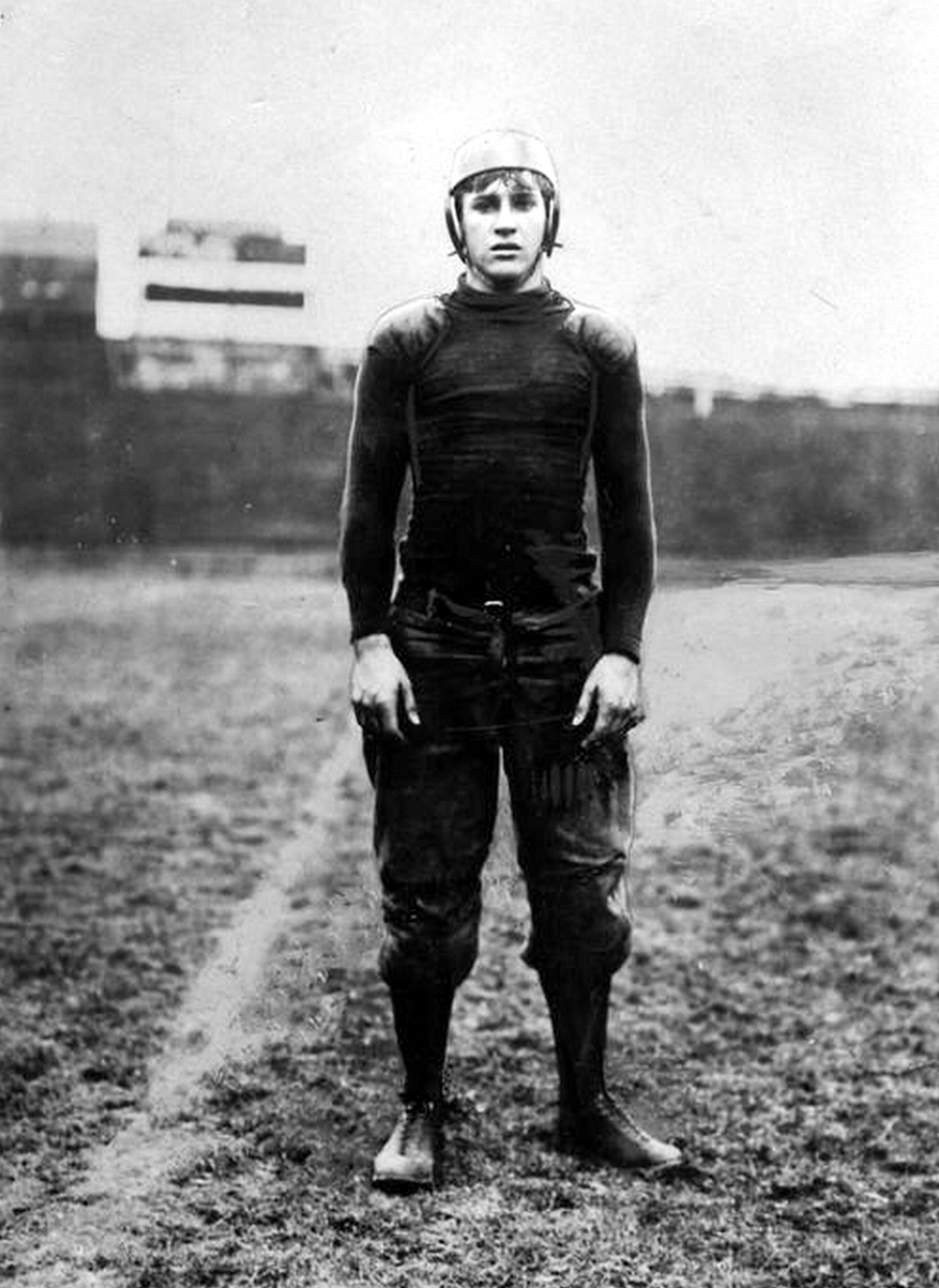
Harold Weekes of Columbia

=== Quarterbacks ===
- **Charles Dudley Daly**, Army (College Football Hall of Fame) (WC-1; CW-1; NYP-1; PI-1)
- John de Saulles, Yale (WC-2; NYP-2)
- Alfred A. Brewster, Jr., Cornell (CW-2)
- Jimmy Johnson, Carlisle (WC-3)

=== Halfbacks ===
- **Robert Kernan**, Harvard (WC-1; CW-1; NYP-1; PI-1)
- **Harold Weekes**, Columbia (College Football Hall of Fame) (WC-1; NYP-1)
- **Bill Morley**, Columbia (College Football Hall of Fame) (WC-3; CW-1)
- Marshall S. Reynolds, Penn (PI-1)
- Adam Casad, Army (NYP-2)
- George B. Chadwick, Yale (CW-2; NYP-2)
- Al "Norsky" Larson, Wisconsin (CW-2)
- Henry Purcell, Cornell (WC-2)
- A. W. Ristine, Harvard (WC-2)
- Willie Heston, Michigan (WC-3)

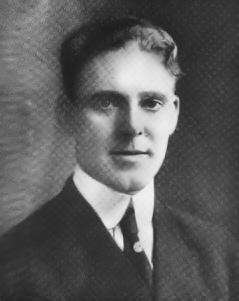
"Blondy" Graydon of Harvard

=== Fullbacks ===
- **Thomas Graydon**, Harvard (WC-1; CW-1; NYP-1)
- David Dudley Cure, Lafayette (WC-2; CW-2; NYP-2)
- Henry Schoellkopf, Cornell (WC-3)

=== Key ===
- WC = Walter Camp published in Collier's Weekly
- CW = Caspar Whitney published in Outing magazine
- NYP = New York Post
- PI = The Philadelphia Inquirer, selected by Dr. N.P. Stauffer

Bold = Consensus All-Americans

== See also ==
- 1901 All-Southern college football team
- 1901 All-Western college football team
