= 3rd Battalion, 29th Field Artillery Regiment =

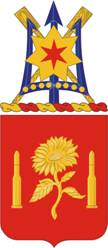
- Regimental insignia of 29th Field Artillery Regiment
- Active: 1918–
- Country: United States
- Branch: Regular Army
- Part of: 3rd Brigade, 4th Infantry Division
- Garrison/HQ: Fort Carson
- Nickname: "Pacesetters"
- Mottos: "Fidelis et Verus" (Faithful and True)
- Equipment: M109A6 Paladin
- Engagements: World War II; Vietnam War; Operation Enduring Freedom; Operation Iraqi Freedom
- Decorations: Presidential Unit Citation; Valorous Unit Award; Meritorious Unit Commendation (DAGO Pending)

The 3rd Battalion, 29th Field Artillery is a unit of the 3rd Brigade Combat Team (3rd BCT) of the 4th Infantry Division, United States Army. The battalion is currently garrisoned at Fort Carson, Colorado (Colorado Springs).

== Structure ==
The battalion consists of three firing batteries of M109A6 Paladin 155 mm self-propelled howitzers. Each firing battery consists of six guns, six field artillery ammunition supply vehicles (FAASVs, also referred to as CATs), two fire direction control (FDC) vehicles, and various support vehicles. Firing batteries are staffed with approximately 100 Soldiers, sub-divided into three platoons (1st, 2nd, and Headquarters).

The battalion also contains two non-firing batteries. The service battery consists of Palletized Loading System (PLS) resupply vehicles, fuelers, cooks, and logistics support services sections. The headquarters battery and headquarters element, collectively known as Headquarters and Headquarters Battery (HHB), consists of battalion command and staff, with supporting equipment and personnel in each of the staff sections (S1 – S6).

== Lineage ==
The 3rd Battalion, 29th Field Artillery Regiment, was originally constituted on 5 July 1918 in the National Army as Battery C, 29th Field Artillery, an element of the 10th Division. It was organized on 11 August 1918 at Camp Funston, KS, where it demobilized on 4 February 1919.

It was reconstituted on 24 March 1923 in the Regular Army as Battery C, 29th Field Artillery Battalion, and activated on 1 August 1940 at Fort Benning, GA, as an element of the 4th Division (later redesignated as the 4th Infantry Division). It was reorganized and redesignated on 1 October 1940 as Battery C, 29th Field Artillery Battalion. The unit inactivated on 14 February 1946 at Camp Butner, NC.

It reactivated on 15 July 1947 at Fort Ord, CA, and inactivated on 1 April 1957 at Fort Lewis, WAn, and relieved from assignment to the 4th Infantry Division.

Redesignated on 30 April 1959 as Battery C, 29th Artillery, it was concurrently, withdrawn from the Regular Army, allotted to the Army Reserve, and assigned to the Second United States Army. It activated on 1 June 1959 at Westminster, MD. It was relieved on 1 January 1966 from assignment to the Second United States Army and assigned to the First United States Army.

The unit was redesignated on 1 September 1971 as Battery C, 29th Field Artillery, before inactivating on 16 September 1979 at Westminster, MD.

Withdrawn on 1 April 1984 from the Army Reserve and allotted to the Regular Army, it was concurrently redesignated as Headquarters and Headquarters Battery, 3rd Battalion, 29th Field Artillery, assigned to the 4th Infantry Division and activated at Fort Carson, CO, with its organic elements concurrently constituted and activated.

== Operation Iraqi Freedom (OIF 1) ==
The 3/29th FA BN was deployed to Iraq in April 2003, under the command of Lt. Colonel Jeffrey Springman, as a part of the 4th Infantry Division invasion force. The battalion initially moved north into Kurdish controlled territory to establish a security presence in the area. They met little resistance during that initial push, however, and the brigade command began a reorganization of battalion Areas of Operation.

During that relative calm, the battalion detached its Alpha battery to take up a detainment facility guard position in the vicinity of Taji, Iraq, and the battalion was assigned a Multiple Launch Rocket platoon from 2nd Battalion 20th Field Artillery (MLRS) and elements of the Brigade Recon Team.

The Pacesetter battalion was soon ordered to move back south to support the ongoing operations to quell the insurgency in the vicinity of Samarra, with Bravo battery establishing a forward operating base (FOB) at the Samarra East Airfield. Its mission was to provide fires to coalition forces conducting sorties into Samarra, and to conduct patrols in the nearby towns and villages. Firebase Paladin was established to provide "calls-for-fire" support, and began providing operation forces with, initially, illumination fire. As the insurgent presence escalated, the battalion began conducting combat fires on reported enemy positions, as well as counter-battery fire to suppress mortar attacks on the FOB and surrounding area.

As the insurgency gained more confidence and began performing more frequent attacks on patrols in and around Samarra, Charlie battery was dispatched from their base of operations near Kirkuk to reinforce Bravo battery, followed closely by the HHB and Service batteries. With the additional forces on-hand, 3/29 FA continued presence patrols in the Duluiyah area and simultaneously provided firebase support to coalition forces and combat patrols in the surrounding "trouble" spots. As the insurgent activity in the area intensified the battalion began conducting cordon and search, scout, raids, and checkpoint operations to hinder insurgent activity.

In addition to combat operations, the battalion established security for civilian infrastructure, provided training to Iraqi Civil Defense Forces (ICDC), and conducted community programs to educate the populace on the units mission and its commitment to bringing increased security and stability to the area.

The battalion was relieved in the spring of 2004 by elements of the 1st Infantry Division. The Pacesetter battalion redeployed with the 4th Infantry Division to Ft. Carson, Colorado, in the spring of 2004.

== Post OIF I ==
In the early summer months of 2004, Lt. Col Jeffrey Vuono took command of the "Pacesetter" Battalion, which would eventually take the name of "Task Force Pacesetter" upon deployment. In December 2004 the 3rd Battalion, 29th Field Artillery Regiment, transitioned from the 4th Infantry Division's Division Artillery (DIVARTY) and became an exclusive part of the 3rd Brigade 4th Infantry Division. This transition was made as part of the Army's move towards self-sustaining modular divisions.

== Operation Iraqi Freedom 2005-07 ==
In November 2005, Task Force Pacesetter deployed in support of Operation Iraqi Freedom 05–07 with the 3rd Heavy Brigade Combat Team, of the 4th Infantry Division. Upon their arrival to the CENTOM Area of Operations, the 3rd HBCT fell under the 101st Airborne Division (Task Force Band of Brothers). At this point, Task Force Pacesetter consisted of the 3–29 FA Battalion, along with D Co 1–8 IN, and B Troop, 2–9 Cav, Civil Affairs Team A-25 B Co 445th Civil Affairs Battalion, and later on, Civil Affairs Team A-5 B 404th Civil Affairs Battalion. Alpha Battery of the 3–29 FA provided fires from FOB Warhorse while sending out Sensor Battery and various other personnel to conduct MITT Operations in the BDE Area of Operations. The majority of Task Force Pacesetter was based at LSA Anaconda at which they conducted Combat Patrols to minimize the insurgent activity in their Area of Operations. Their efforts encompassed from Abyachi to Albu Hishma and Yethrib, over to Ad Dijual and their western areas up to 10 miles (16 km).

The Task Force went from a traditional Artillery Battery, to conduct a very diverse mission which they had never done before, to include counter-insurgency operations, non-kinetic (non-lethal) operations, fire support, and creating high quality soldiers for the Iraqi Army. The Task Force was extremely successful in all aspects of their operations in Iraq. The Task Force eventually gave up their elements of 1–8 IN, and 2–9 Cav in June 2006, in support of other priority operations, along with CAT A5 B Co 404th Civil Affairs Battalion. Due to the reduction in assets, the Task Force reduced its Area of Operation to a smaller size so more emphasis could be placed on areas where it was needed, both lethal and non-lethal.

In August 2006, Task Force Pacesetter was moved under the operational control of the 3rd Brigade Combat Team, 101st Airborne Division due to the realignment of battle spaces and provinces.

In November 2006, Task Force Pacesetter redeployed to their home at Fort Carson, CO along with the rest of the 3rd Heavy Brigade Combat Team, 4th Infantry Division.

== Operation Iraqi Freedom 2007-09 ==
In December 2007, Task Force Pacesetter deployed to the International Zone, commonly called the "Green Zone". There they helped with the security of the Green Zone by controlling the Entry Control Points or ECP, and assisted in the transport of military personnel and civilian contractors to the Baghdad International Airport. The Pacesetters were instrumental in redesigning the ECP and increasing the overall security of the International Zone.

Around August 2008, Alpha Battery was reassigned to three different areas outside the Green Zone. Alpha was tasked with increasing the overall security situation in the areas of Suleikh, Adamiyah, and FOB Callahan. While there, Alpha conducted area patrols, terrorists searches and detainment, force protection and public interaction. Alpha distributed grants for schools and businesses, and helped to train the Iraqi Police and Iraqi Army in the areas.

Task Force Pacesetter lost three of their number while deployed to Iraq this time: one to EFP, one to sniper fire, and one to combat vehicle rollover. The Pacesetters redeployed to Fort Carson, Co in February 2009, completing a 14-month deployment.

== See also ==
- 4th Infantry Division

United States Army
