= Charles Romeyn (American football) =

American football player and US Army officer (1874–1950)

Charles A. Romeyn
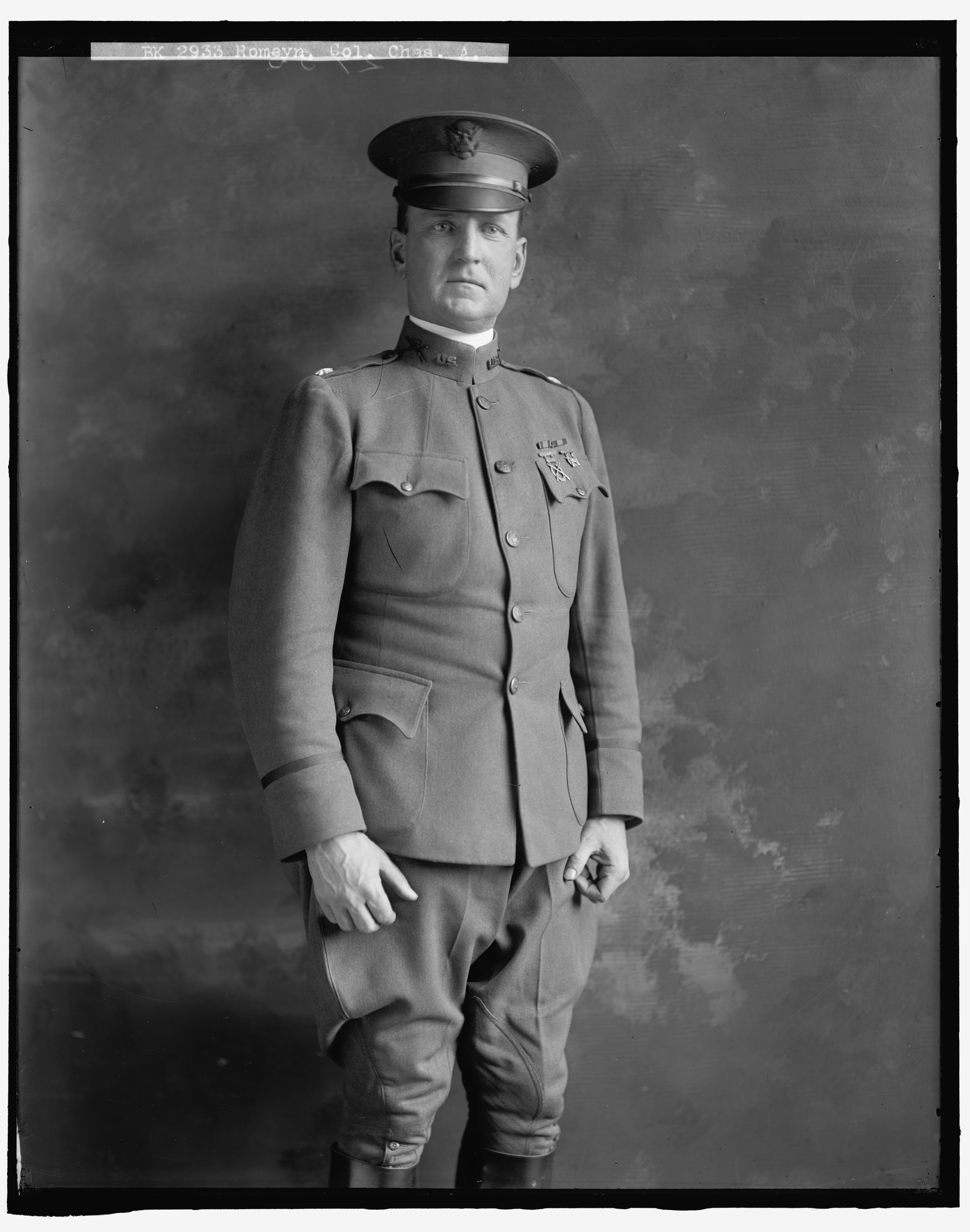

Profile
- Position: Fullback

Personal information
- Born: December 14, 1874; Indian Territory
- Died: January 31, 1950 (aged 75); Washington, D.C., U.S.

Career information
- College: U. S. Military Academy (1898)

Awards and highlights
- Consensus All-American (1898)

Charles Annesley Romeyn (December 14, 1874 – January 31, 1950) was an American football player and United States Army officer. He played for the Army Black Knights football team and was selected as a consensus first-team fullback on the 1898 College Football All-America Team.

== Early life ==
Romeyn was born in 1874 in Indian Territory, in what is now the state of Oklahoma. He was the son of Major Romeyn.

== West Point ==
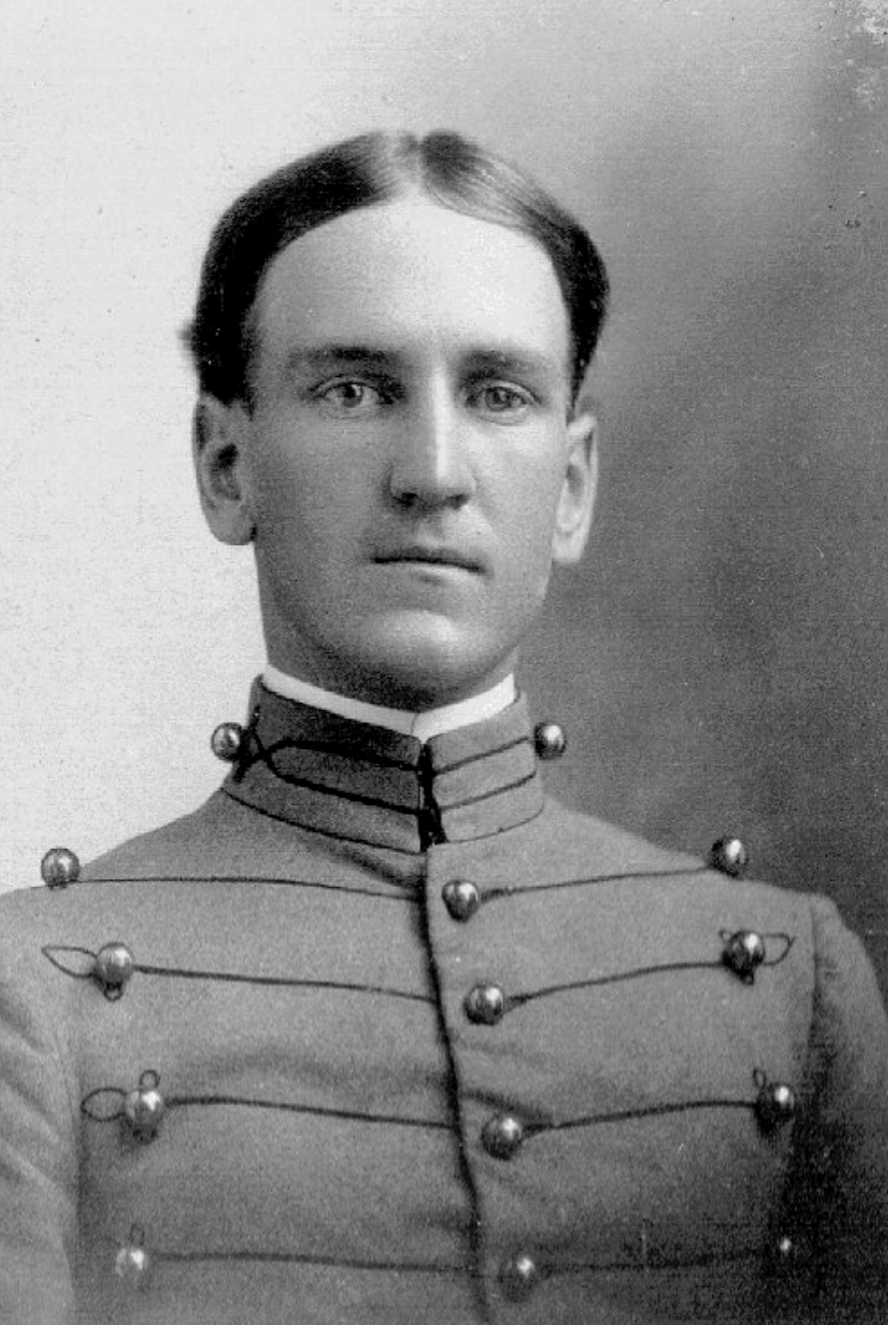
At West Point in 1899

Romeyn attended the United States Military Academy at West Point, New York. While at the academy, he played at the fullback position for the Army Black Knights football team and was a consensus first-team selection for the 1898 College Football All-America Team.

Shortly before the 1898 football season got underway, Romeyn was stripped of his captain's stripes due to an "unmilitary order" he gave to cadets under his command. He reportedly told cadets, "Keep your faces to the front. Turn your eyes if you want to see things, but remain quiet and face front."

== Military career ==
Romeyn graduated from the Military Academy in 1899 and spent his entire career in the Army. He was initially commissioned as a second lieutenant in the 10th Cavalry in February 1899 and stationed at Bayamo, Cuba until December 1899. He next served at Fort McIntosh, Texas, until April 1901. He was promoted to first lieutenant in February 1901 and was next stationed in the Philippines at Samar until October 1901.

Romeyn next served in Montana on detached service at the Tongue River Agency charged with "quieting" the Cheyenne Indians in January 1902 and then on guard duty there until November 1902. He next served at Fort Meade in South Dakota before returning to the Philippines from June 1903 to May 1905. In the Philippines, Romeyn was stationed at Camp Stotsenburg.

In August 1905, Romeyn was promoted to captain while stationed at Fort Myer, Virginia. He next served at Fort Riley, Kansas, where he was a member of the Army Cavalry Rifle Team, entering national competitions in 1905, 1906 and 1907. From October 1907 to November 1909, Romeyn was stationed at Fort Des Moines. He participated in the Army's November and December 1907 expedition to Thunder Butte, South Dakota, with the mission of "quieting" Ute Indians. He also served as coach of the Army Cavalry Rifle Team in 1909. From December 1909 to May 1912, Romeyn served his third tour in the Philippines. He participated in action against "Moro bandits" in 1911 in the Cagayan Valley.

Romeyn returned to the United States in June 1912 and was assigned to Fort Bliss in Texas and then Fort Leavenworth in Kansas. At the later station, he was a student officer at the Army School of the Line and Army Staff College. He graduated from Army Staff College in May 1914. From May 1914 to August 1917, he was stationed at Fort Ethan Allen in Vermont. He was promoted to major of the cavalry in May 1917, adjutant-general in July 1917 and lieutenant-colonel in August 1917. From August 1917 to June 1918, he was stationed at Camp Devens, a temporary cantonment in Massachusetts for training soldiers during World War I, with the 302nd Infantry. In July 1918, he was promoted to colonel of the infantry and became a member of the Army General Staff in Washington, D.C.

Romeyn retired from the military in December 1938 at age 64. He died at Walter Reed Army Hospital on January 31, 1950, at age 75, and was buried at West Point Cemetery.
