= Perry Hale =

American football player and coach (1878–1948)

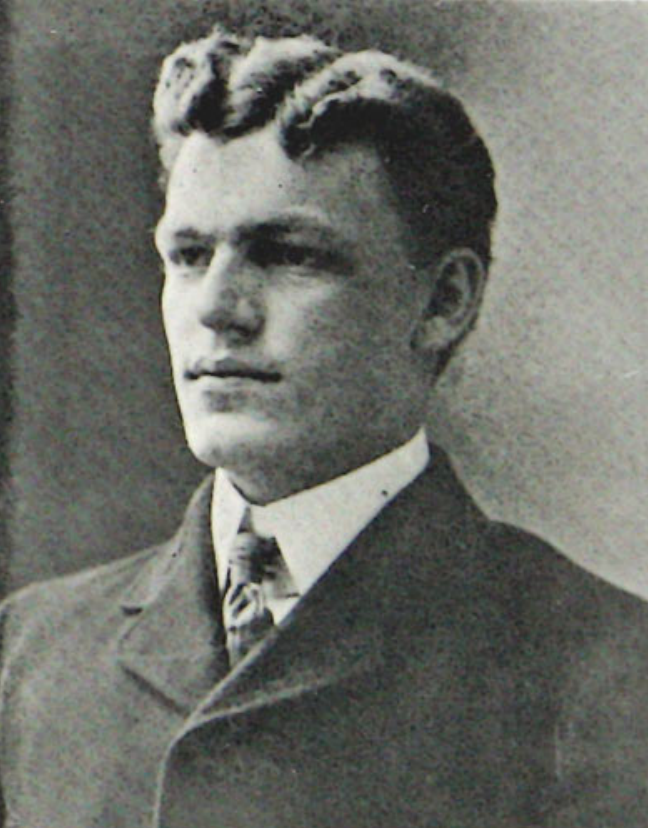
- Hale pictured in Makio 1901, Ohio State yearbook

Biographical details
- Born: October 7, 1878; Portland, Connecticut, U.S.
- Died: April 8, 1948 (aged 69); Portland, Connecticut, U.S.

Playing career
- 1899–1900: Yale
- 1901: Homestead L & A.C.
- Position: Fullback

Coaching career (HC unless noted)
- 1901: Exeter Academy (NH)
- 1902–1903: Ohio State

Head coaching record
- Overall: 14–5–2 (college)

Accomplishments and honors

Awards
- Consensus All-American (1900)

Perry Titus Wells Hale (October 7, 1878 – April 8, 1948) was an American football player and coach. He played college football at Yale University and was selected to the 1900 College Football All-America Team as a fullback. Hale also played professionally for the 1901 Homestead Library & Athletic Club football team. That season, he also coached the Phillips Exeter Academy football team and joined Homestead in mid-November after Exeter's last game. Hale then served as the sixth head football coach at Ohio State University from 1902 to 1903, compiling a record of 14–5–2. He was 0–2 against Michigan.

After his football career, Hale was the water manager for Middletown, Connecticut. He was arrested in May 1910 for misapplying city funds. Hale stated that the $5,000 shortfall was due to an accounting error. A subsequent investigation found the charges to be groundless.

He died of heart disease in 1948. He had been blinded as a result of an explosion in 1913. In 1923, he was elected tax collector for Portland, Connecticut, and held that position until his death in 1948.

== Head coaching record ==
=== College ===
Year	Team	Overall	Conference	Standing	Bowl/playoffs
Ohio State Buckeyes (Ohio Athletic Conference) (1902–1903)
1902	Ohio State	6–2–2	2–1	2nd	
1903	Ohio State	8–3	3–1	2nd	
Ohio State:		14–5–2	5–2		
Total:		14–5–2			

== Bibliography ==
- Notes of the Football Players New York Times October 17, 1901
- Admits Accounts Are Short: But Hale Old Yale Fullback is Not Worrying Over Charge New York Times May 4, 1910
