= Robert Kernan =

American football player and businessman (1881–1955)

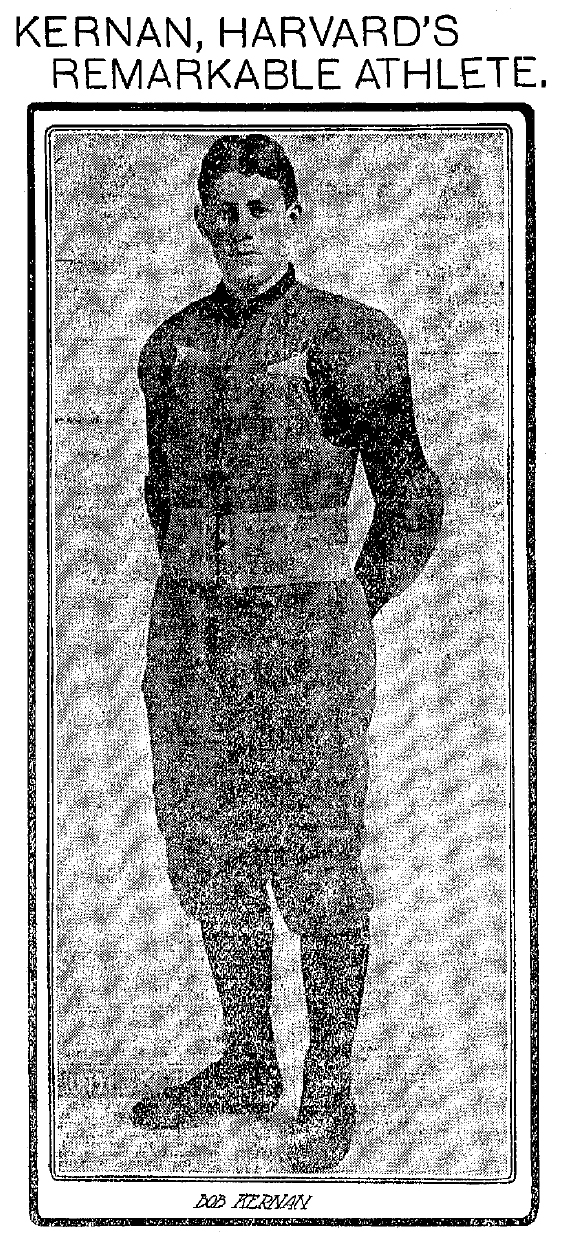

Profile
- Position: Halfback

Personal information
- Born: July 18, 1881; Utica, New York, U.S.
- Died: January 1, 1955 (aged 73); Montreal, Quebec, Canada

Career information
- College: Harvard University (1901–1902)

Awards and highlights
- Consensus All-American (1901)

Robert Peebles Kernan (July 18, 1881 – January 1, 1955) was an American football player and businessman.

Kernan was born in Utica, New York in 1881 and raised in Brooklyn. He attended the Brooklyn Polytechnic School before enrolling at Harvard College. He played college football for the Harvard Crimson football team as a halfback and punter in 1901 and 1902. He was selected as a consensus All-American in 1901 and was the captain of Harvard's 1902 football team. A newspaper story in 1902 called Kernan "one of the most remarkable college athletes in the world," and added the following about his gridiron talent:

He is of ideal build for a plunging half-back, and the force with which he plunges into and tears through the center of the line is only little less dangerous to an opposing team than the speed with which he goes around the end. . . . He is the kicker of the university and in a game can punt from fifty to seventy yards.

Kernan also played four years for Harvard's baseball team, playing as both a pitcher and catcher. He was also a high jumper for the track team and, in 1903, won the intercollegiate championship with a high jump of six feet and one inch. Kernan received a total of seven varsity letters and was later inducted into Harvard's Varsity Club Hall of Fame as an all-around athlete.

After graduating from Harvard in 1903, Kernan received a law degree from Columbia University and was admitted to the bar in 1906. He practiced law in New York for several years. In 1910, he became an assistant football coach at Harvard with responsibility for training the punters.

In 1911, Kernan was involved in the formation of the Donnacona Paper Company in Quebec. He was the vice president and general manager of that company until 1932. He became the company's president in 1932 and later also served as the company's chairman.

Kernan was married twice. In 1917, he married Louise Adams Beardsley; she died in 1920. In 1923, he married Alice Fitzpatrick. She died in 1954. Kernan died on January 1, 1955, in Montreal at age 73.
